= 2009 WTA Tour Championships =

- Date: October 27 – November 1
- Edition: 39th (singles) / 34th (doubles)
- Draw: 8S / 4D
- Surface: Hard / outdoor
- Location: Doha, Qatar
- Venue: Khalifa International Tennis Complex

Champions

Singles
- (United States) Serena Williams

Doubles
- (Spain) Nuria Llagostera Vives (Spain) María José Martínez Sánchez
- WTA Finals

The 2009 WTA Tour Championships (also known as Sony Ericsson Championships – Doha 2009) was held in Doha, Qatar from October 27 to November 1. It was the second time the Khalifa International Tennis Complex hosted the WTA Tour Year-End Singles and Doubles Championships.

Women's Tennis Association (WTA) rank No. 2 Serena Williams won her second year-end championships title, defeating sister, Venus Williams in the final 6–2, 7–6^{(7–4)}. The Spanish duo of Nuria Llagostera Vives and María José Martínez Sánchez won the doubles event on their debut 7–6^{(7–0)}, 5–7, [10–7]. They defeated the world No. 1s in doubles and defending champions, Cara Black and Liezel Huber, in the final.

== Finals ==
=== Singles ===
(United States) Serena Williams defeated (United States) Venus Williams, 6–2, 7–6^{(7–4)}.

=== Doubles ===
(Spain) Nuria Llagostera Vives / (Spain) María José Martínez Sánchez defeated (Zimbabwe) Cara Black / (United States) Liezel Huber, 7–6^{(7–0)}, 5–7, [10–7].

== Qualifying ==
=== Singles ===
Race Rankings singles (26 October 2009)
Rk	Name	Points	Tour	Date Qualified
1	(Russia) Dinara Safina	7731	18	August 5
2	(United States) Serena Williams	7576	17	August 19
3	(Russia) Svetlana Kuznetsova	5772	18	October 5
4	(Denmark) Caroline Wozniacki	5475	24	September 14
5	(Russia) Elena Dementieva	5415	19	September 14
6	(Belarus) Victoria Azarenka	4451	16	October 9
7	(United States) Venus Williams	4397	16	October 9
8	(Serbia) Jelena Janković	3555	18	October 22

On August 5, the first qualifier for the year-end championship was announced in Dinara Safina.

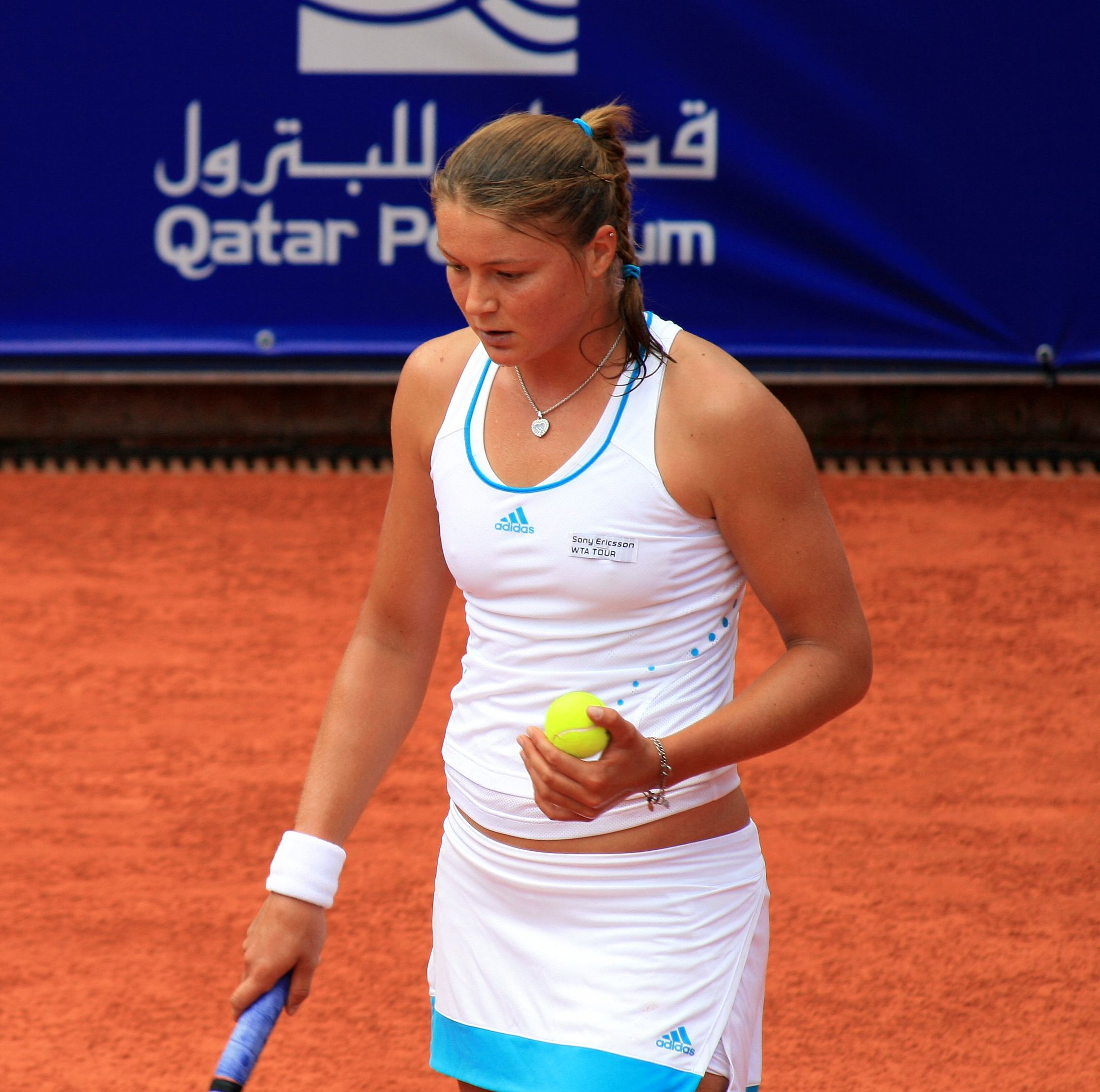
Dinara Safina is the No. 1 seed in the championship

Dinara Safina enjoyed a good start to the year reaching the finals of ASB Classic losing to Elena Dementieva 6–3 2–6 6–1, followed by her second Grand Slam final, her first on a hardcourt in the Australian Open but was thrashed by Serena Williams 6–0 6–3. Safina then became the world no. 1 after Serena's Charleston points dropped off. She then made her 3rd final in the Porsche Tennis Grand Prix but once again ended up on the losing side to Svetlana Kuznetsova 6–4 6–3. She then claimed two titles back-to-back in the Internazionali BNL d'Italia defeating Kuznetsova winning 6–3 6–2; and in the Mutua Madrileña Madrid Open defeating Caroline Wozniacki 6–2 6–4.

She then competed in her 4th straight finals and her 6th of the year at the French Open but once again lost to Kuznetsova 6–4 6–2. She then reached the Semifinals of the Wimbledon Championships but was once again questioned for her credibility as the world no. 1 as Venus Williams crushed her in the most dominating scoreline that a current world no. 1 has ever lost 6–1 6–0. - However she bounce back from that loss by winning the Slovenia Open defeating Sara Errani 6–7(5) 6–1 7–5 in the final. She reached her 8th final in Cincinnati but lost to Jelena Janković 6–4 6–2. Safina struggled in the US Open being pushed in the first and second rounds by much lower ranked players. She ended up losing to Petra Kvitová in the third round 6–4 2–6 7–6(5).

This is Safina's 2nd appearance and is trying to win her first match as she went 0-3 last year.

On August 19 - The second qualifier was announced as Serena Williams following her semifinal appearance at the Rogers Cup.

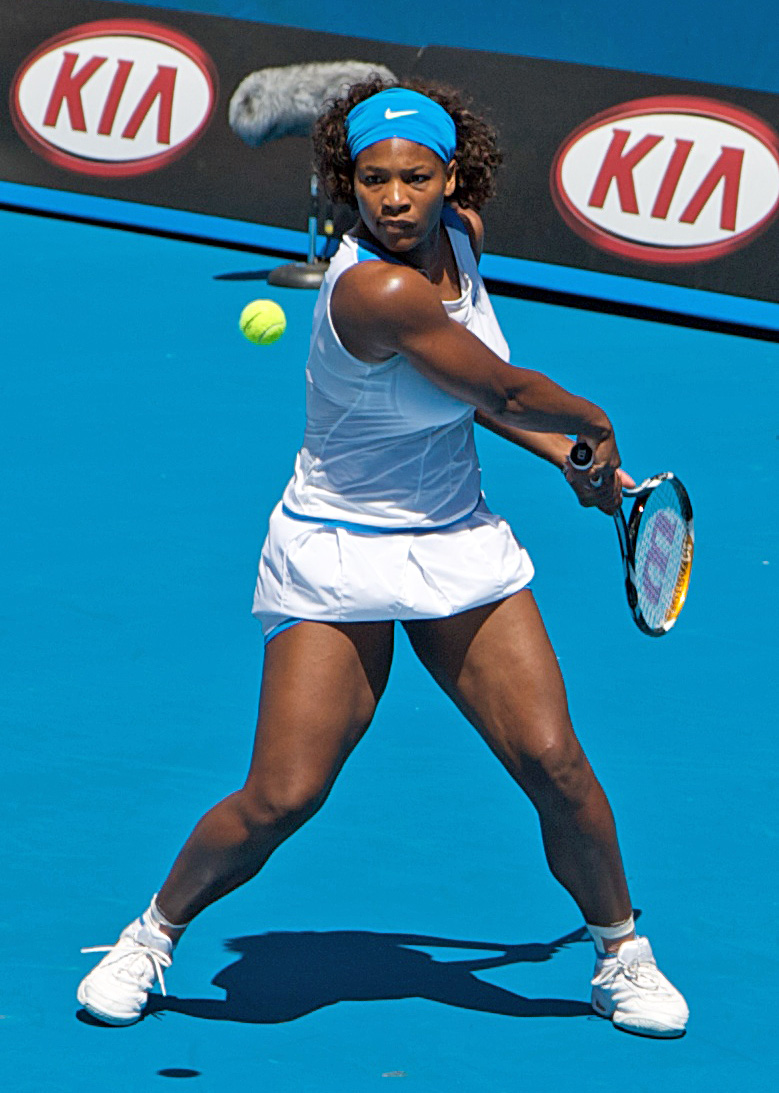
Serena Williams won her 10th and 11th Grand Slams at the Australian Open and Wimbledon

Serena Williams Began the year by winning the Australian Open. She then reached the final of the Sony Ericsson Open after defeating Venus in the semifinals to keep her no.1 ranking. Playing injured she lost to Victoria Azarenka 6–3, 6–1. From there she went on a four match losing streak, the longest of her career and lost World No. 1 ranking to Safina on April 20 to Dinara Safina when she pulled out of Family Circle Cup. Despite a lack of preparation, Williams reached the quarterfinals of the French Open before losing to the eventual champion Kuznetsova 7–6(4), 5–7, 7–5, which ended her 18–match Grand Slam winning streak.

However she rebounded at Wimbledon defeating Elena Dementieva 6–7(4) 7–5 8–6. The match was named by many as the best match of the year, she then claimed her third title by defeating Venus 7–6(3) 6–2. In the US Open, she reached the semifinals. She reclaimed the no. 1 spot for two weeks from Safina after outperforming Safina in the China Open. This is Serena's sixth appearance and is trying to reclaim the world no. 1 from Dinara Safina. Serena won the event in 2001 and was the runner-up in 2002 and 2004. Serena has a 10–5 record in the year-end championships.

On the 4th of September, Caroline Wozniacki and Elena Dementieva were the third and fourth to qualify, respectively

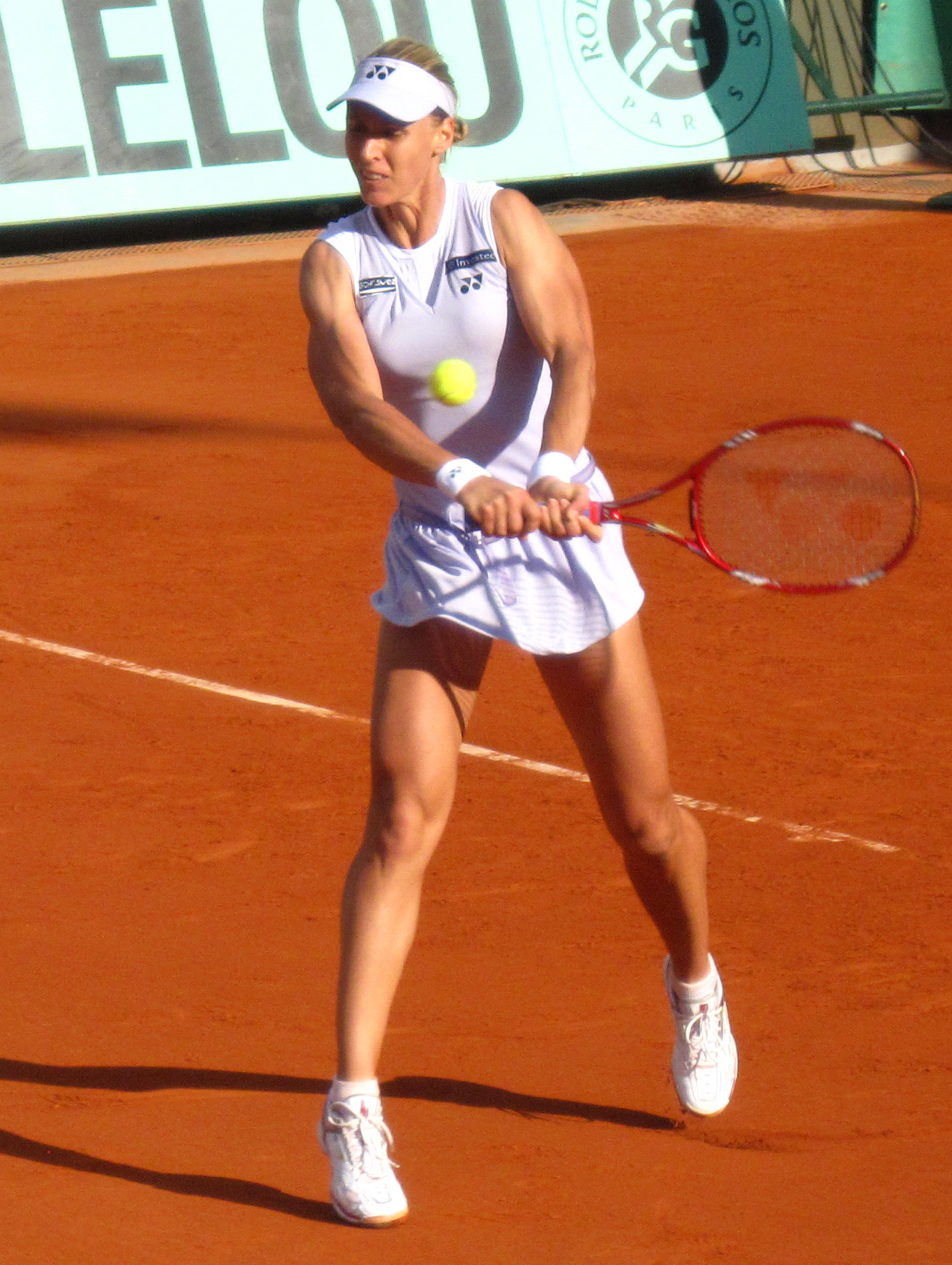
Elena Dementieva won the 2009 US Open Series

Elena Dementieva has enjoyed a remarkable season that was begun by winning 15 consecutive matches including titles in ASB Classic and Medibank International Sydney where she defeated the top two seeds Serena Williams and Dinara Safina, she then reached the semifinals of the Australian Open losing to eventual champion Serena 6–3 6–4. She then reached the finals of Open GDF Suez losing to Amélie Mauresmo 7–6(7) 2–6 6–4. At the French Open she was upset by Samantha Stosur after winning her match against Jelena Dokić due to Dokić's retirement. Dementieva played one of the most memorable matches on the Sony Ericsson WTA Tour in 2009 when she was defeated by Serena Williams in the semifinals of Wimbledon (6–7(4) 7–5 8–6) in a marathon that lasted nearly three hours. Dementieva's successful hard court season was highlighted by winning the Rogers Cup in Toronto defeating Maria Sharapova 6–4 6–3 in the finals and clinching the title of US Open Series winner. However she was upset by Melanie Oudin in the second round of the US Open. Dementieva also claimed her career high this year of no. 3 for 7 weeks. This is Dementieva's 9th appearance with her best showing coming from 2000 and 2008 reaching the semifinals. She has 5–16 record in the championship coming to this year's event.

Caroline Wozniacki season was highlighted by 3 titles on 3 different surfaces in MPS Group Championships a green clay event defeating Aleksandra Wozniak 6–1 6–2, In Aegon International a grass event defeating Virginie Razzano 7–6(5) 7–5 and in Pilot Pen Tennis a hardcourt event defeating Elena Vesnina 6–2 6–4. Wozniacki also reached 5 other finals in the Cellular South Cup losing to Azarenka 6–1 6–3, the Family Circle Cup losing to Sabine Lisicki 6–2 6–4, the Mutua Madrileña Madrid Open losing to Safina 6–2 6–4, the Swedish Open losing to María José Martínez Sánchez 7–5 6–4 and her biggest achievement so reaching the finals of the US Open her first time to reach a spot greater than the fourth round, losing to Kim Clijsters 7–5, 6–3 and reaching world no. 5. She will be competing in her 1st year-end championship. She will be making her debut at the year-end championship.

On October 5, Svetlana Kuznetsova became the fifth qualifier.

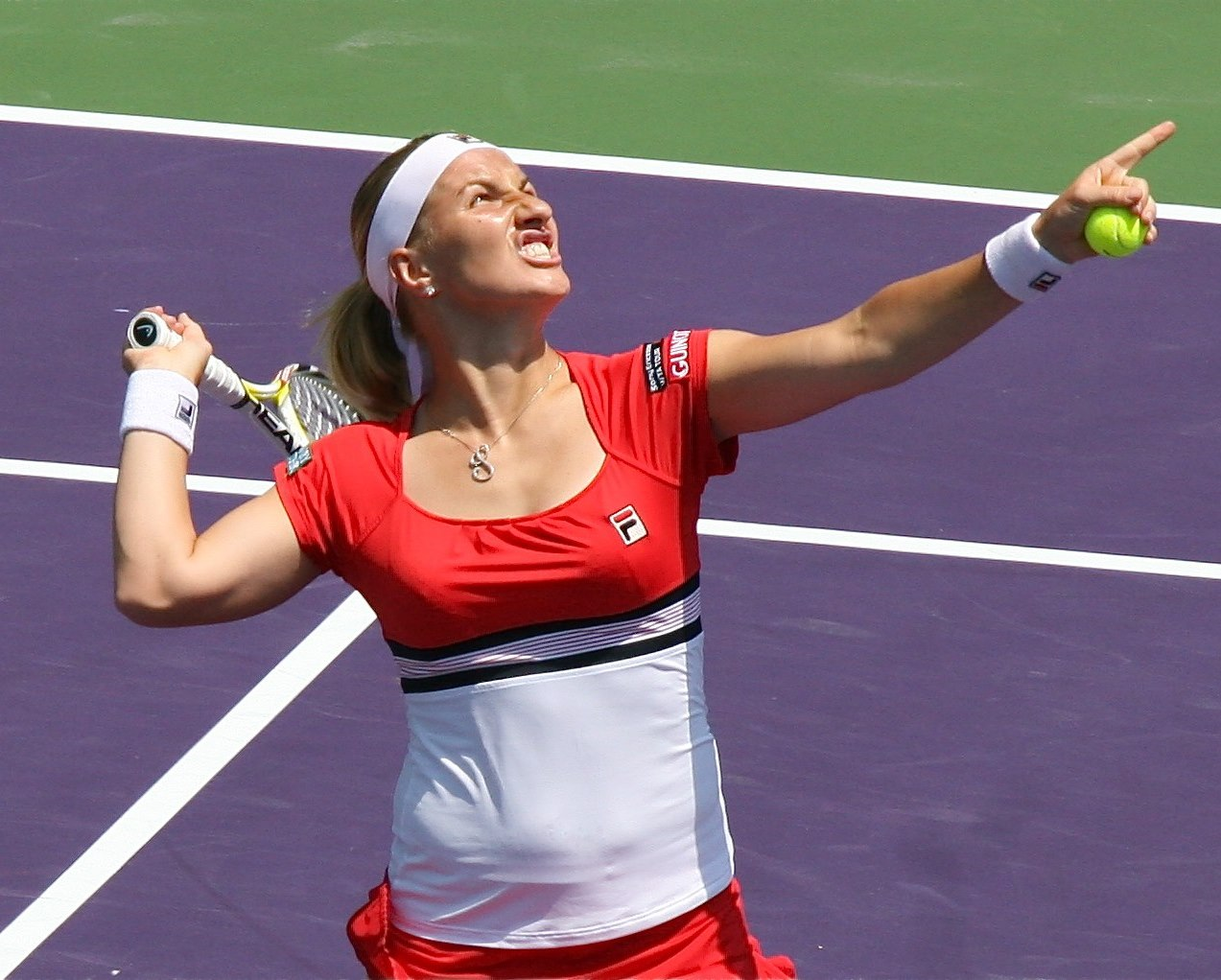
Svetlana Kuznetsova won her second Grand Slam at the 2009 French Open

Svetlana Kuznetsova began the year with a Quarterfinal appearance at the Australian Open where she lost to eventual champion Serena Williams 5–7 7–5 6–1 throwing of a lead in the second set. In the Porsche Tennis Grand Prix Kuznetsova won her first title in two years defeating Safina 6–4 6–3, the following week she once again faced Safina in the final of Internazionali BNL d'Italia however this time she lost 6–3 6–2. At the French Open Kuznetsova made easy work on Safina in the final 6–4 6–2 in just 74 minutes despite struggling against Serena and Samantha Stosur the previous rounds. The 2009 French Open is her 2nd Major, her first being the 2004 US Open. She then had a patch of bad run then on including a third round lost at Wimbledon losing to Lisicki 6–2 7–5 and 4th round lost to Caroline Wozniacki 2–6 7–6(5) 7–6(3) at the US Open. She then won the 2009 China Open over Agnieszka Radwańska 6–2 6–4 this helped her regain the no. 3 ranking. This is Kuznetsova's 5th appearance and trying to rub off an 8 match losing streak at the championship. Kuznetsova has a 1–10 record in the tournament's history.

On October 9 Venus Williams and Victoria Azarenka qualified together as sixth and seventh qualifiers.

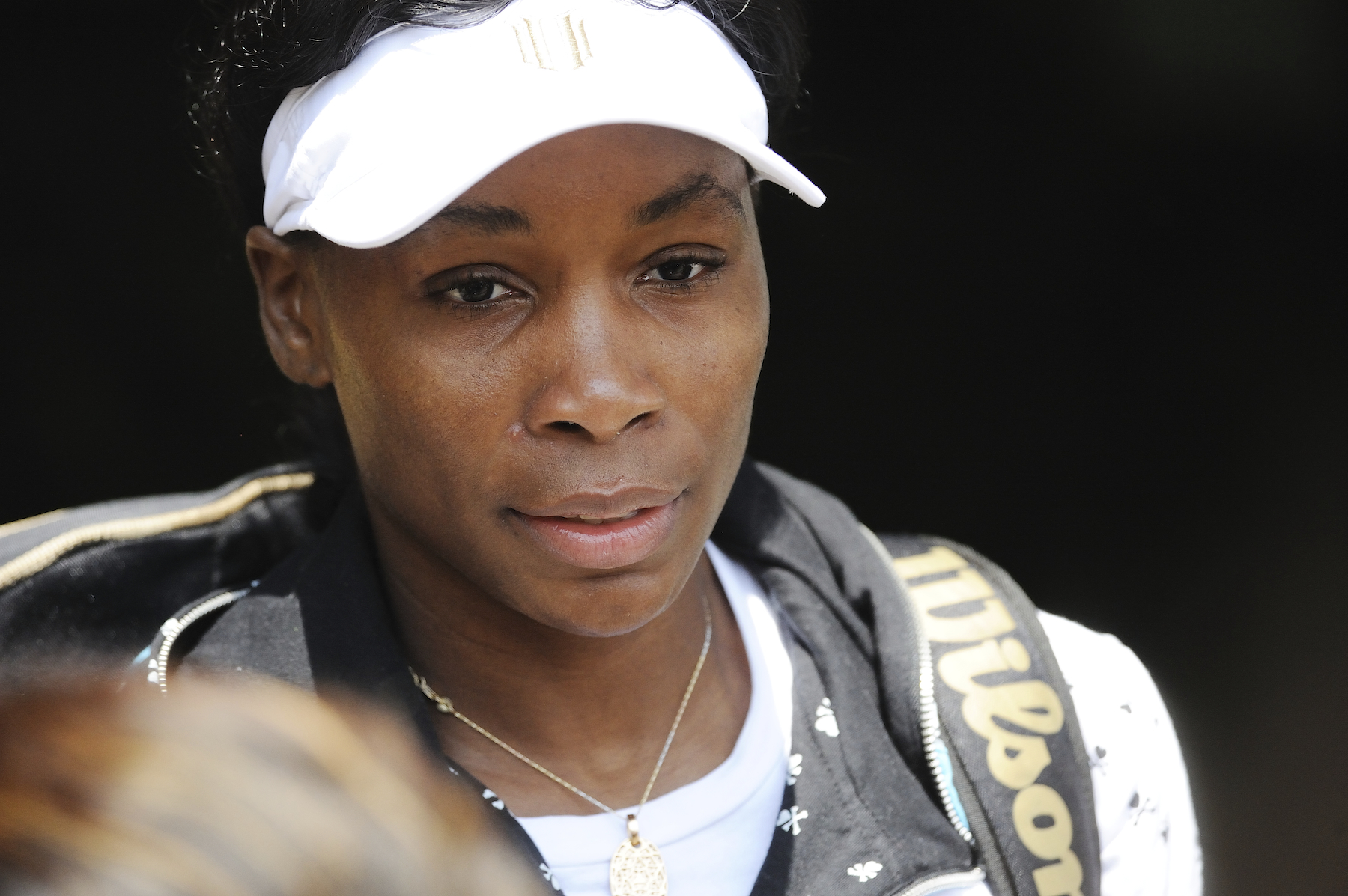
Venus Williams reached the finals of 2009 Wimbledon

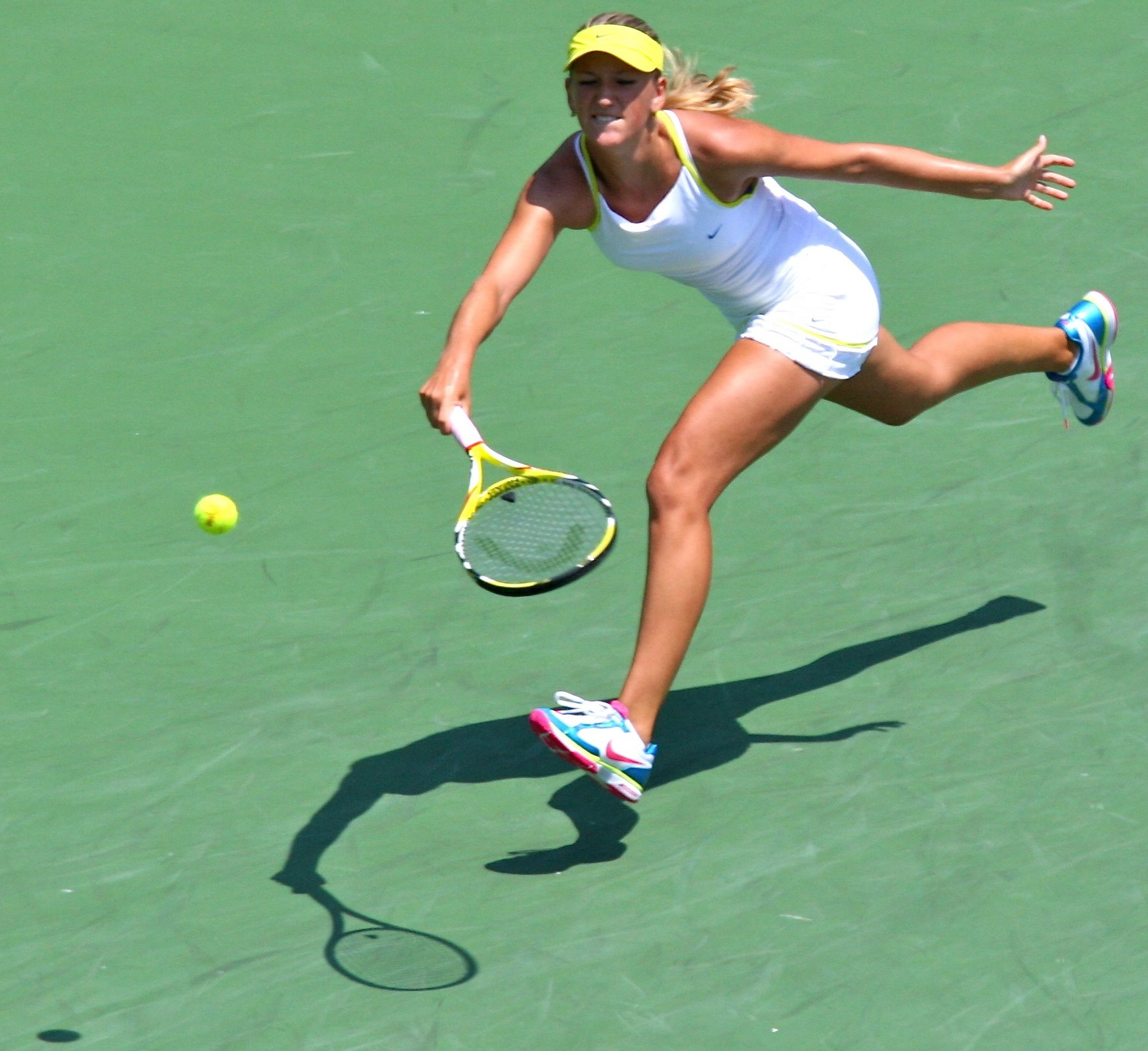
Victoria Azarenka won her biggest title so far at Miami

Venus Williams is the defending champion. Venus won back-to-back titles in the Dubai Tennis Championships defeating Virginie Razzano 6–4 6–2. En route, she defeated Dementieva and Serena and a title in the Abierto Mexicano Telcel defeating Flavia Pennetta 6–1 6–2 and her first clay title since May 2005. She then went to Wimbledon as the defending champion, losing in the finals to her sister Serena 7–6(3), 6–2 after crushing world no. 1 Dinara Safina 6–1 6–0 the biggest win against a reigning world no. 1. She also reached the final in Stanford losing to Marion Bartoli. In the Grand Slams Venus' performance was not good losing in the 2nd round of Australian Open, 3rd round of the French Open and 4th round of US Open. This is Venus' 4th appearance and she has never lost before the semifinals. Venus has an impressive record of 9–2 in the event.

This is Venus' 4th appearance and she has never lost before the semifinals. Venus has an impressive record of 9–2 in the event, and is the defending champion

Victoria Azarenka is enjoying her best season so far by reaching a career high no. 6. She began the year with her first career title in Brisbane International defeating Marion Bartoli 6–3 6–1, then followed it up with titles in Cellular South Cup defeating Wozniacki 6–1 6–3 and Sony Ericsson Open, defeating five-time Miami champion Serena Williams. She also managed to reach the quarterfinals of the French Open losing to Safina 1–6 6–4 6–2 and Wimbledon losing to eventual champion Serena 6–2 6–3. She will be competing in her 1st year-end championship.

On October 22 Jelena Janković claimed the last spot as Radwańska and Zvonareva fell early at the Kremlin Cup.

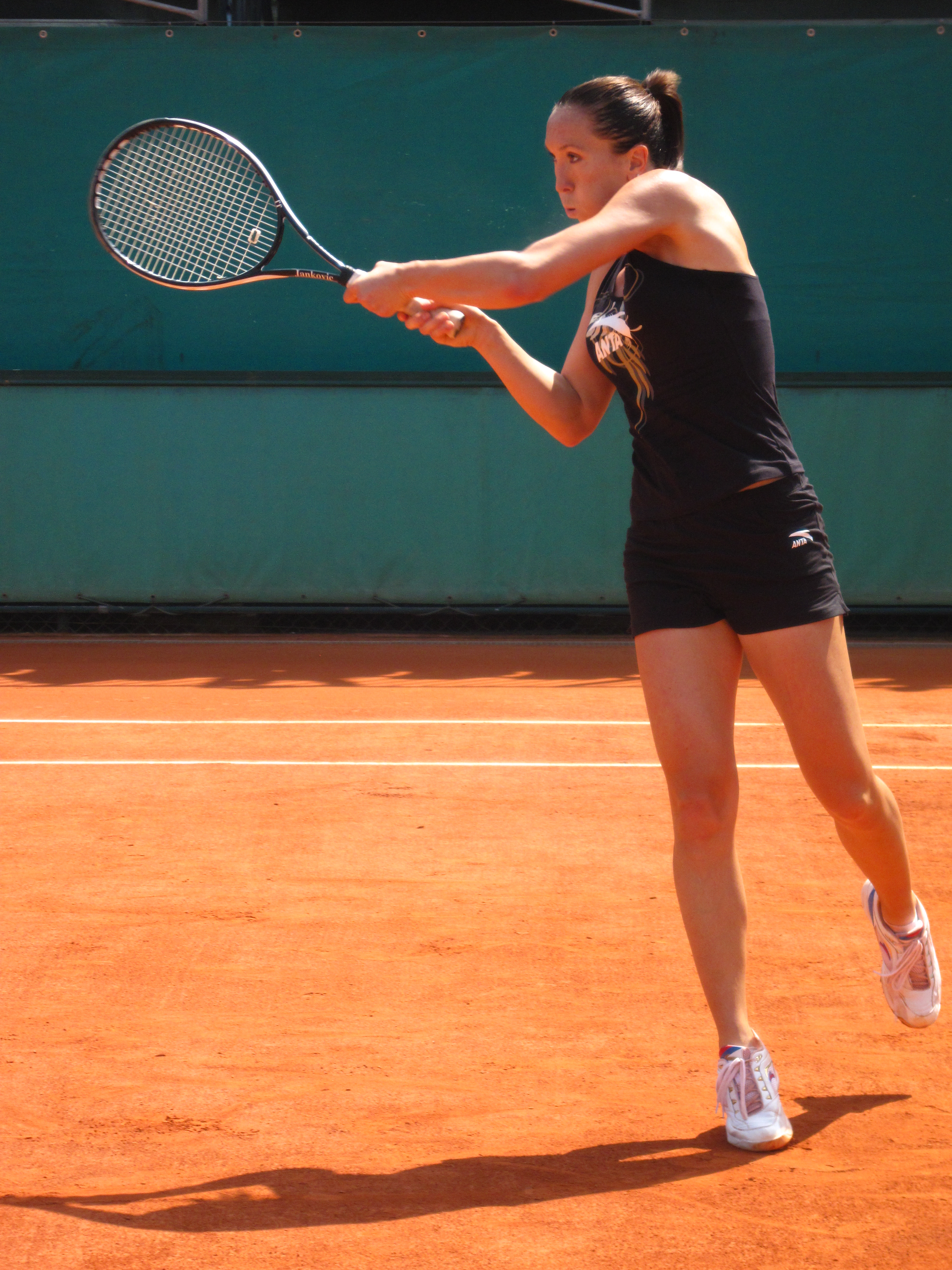
Jelena Janković won in Cincinnati

Jelena Janković who is having a not so satisfying year, still managed to win the red clay tournament in Andalucia Tennis Experience defeating Carla Suárez Navarro 6–3 3–6 6–3 and Western & Southern Financial Group Women's Open defeating Safina 6–4 6–2. She also became the runner up at Tokyo, retiring in the final against Maria Sharapova due to wrist injury. In Grand Slams Janković the furthest she has reached in a slam was a fourth round. Janković failed to make it past the fourth round of a Grand Slam in 2009. This Janković's 3rd appearance having her best result last year finishing in the semifinals with a 2–5 record coming to the event.

The two alternate spots were taken by Vera Zvonareva, who had a fascinating first half of the year by reaching the semifinal of Australian Open losing to Safina 6–3 7–6(4) and winning two titles in Pattaya Women's Open defeating Sania Mirza 7–5 6–1, an international tournament, and Indian Wells defeating Ana Ivanovic 7–6(5) 6–2 also defeating Wozniacki 6–4 6–2 and Azarenka 6–3 6–3 en route, a Premier Mandatory tournament. She withdrew from Internazionali BNL d'Italia, Mutua Madrileña Madrid Open and Roland Garros with a right ankle injury. In the US Open she lost to Flavia Pennetta in the Fourth Round when she lost 6–0 in the third when she started whipping on court. This will be her 3rd appearance if one of the players withdraw, she has a 4–4 record at the event. The other alternate is Agnieszka Radwańska, who had consistent results throughout the year, reaching at least the quarterfinals in twelve tournaments, including a runner-up finish at the China Open losing to Svetlana Kuznetsova 6–2 6–4, She scored 2 top 10 wins in the year over Ana Ivanovic and Elena Dementieva. This will be Radwańska's second appearance if a second player withdraws she has a 1–0 record at the event

=== Doubles ===
Race Rankings doubles (26 October 2009)
Rk	Name	Points	Tour	Date Qualified
1	(Zimbabwe) Cara Black (United States) Liezel Huber	9100	20	September 9
2	(United States) Venus Williams (United States) Serena Williams	6750	5	September 29
3	(Spain) Nuria Llagostera Vives (Spain) María José Martínez Sánchez	6396	19	October 5
4	(Australia) Rennae Stubbs (Australia) Samantha Stosur	5048	15	October 12

On September 9 - Cara Black and Liezel Huber, the defending champions, were the first to qualify for the championships after their runner-up finish at Wimbledon.

Cara Black and Liezel Huber have been the no. 1 doubles team since 2007. Performing consistently during the slams, they had a quarterfinal finish at the Australian Open losing to eventual runners-up Hantuchová and Sugiyama. They then made a semifinal appearance at the French Open losing to eventual champions Medina Garrigues and Ruano Pascual and Wimbledon losing to eventual champions the Williams sisters, and reached their first major final of the year in the US Open losing again to the Williams Sisters. Outside the majors, they won back-to-back titles at the Open GDF Suez defeating Peschke and Raymond and Dubai Tennis Championships defeating Kirilenko and Radwańska. They also won Mutua Madrileña Madrid Open once again outlasting Raymond and Peschke, Aegon Classic defeating the American team of Kops-Jones and Spears, and Western & Southern Financial Group Women's Open over Llagostera Vives and Martínez Sánchez. They were the only team to win at least a title on all 3 different surfaces.

On September 29 the second team to qualify was the Williams Sisters, Serena Williams and Venus Williams

Serena Williams and Venus Williams are competing in their first year-end championships, who were considered to be the biggest threat in the doubles even though they had a low ranking at the beginning of the year. They had an impressive record of 24-1 through the year, with their only lost at the French Open to Petrova and Mattek-Sands. They won three of the four Grand Slams with victories at the Australian Open defeating Hantuchová and Sugiyama, Wimbledon defeating Stosur and Stubbs, and at the US Open defeating Black and Huber, all in straight sets. To maintain their record for never losing in any grandslam doubles finals. They also won the Bank of the West Classic defeating Chan and Niculescu, their first non-Slam title since 1999.

On October 5, The third team to qualify was Nuria Llagostera Vives and María José Martínez Sánchez.

Nuria Llagostera Vives and María José Martínez Sánchez, even though they did not have a good run at the slams with a first round exit at the French Open and three quarterfinal exits at the Australian Open, Wimbledon and the US Open, they won the most doubles titles of the year with six titles. They had back-to-back titles at Copa Sony Ericsson Colsanitas defeating Pennetta and Dulko and Abierto Mexicano Telcel in an all Spanish final prevailing over compatriots Domínguez Lino and Parra Santonja. As well as back-to-back titles at the Rogers Cup prevailing over Stosur and Stubbs and the Pilot Pen event defeating the Czezh team of Benešová and Hradecká. They also won the Barcelona Ladies Open outlasting Cîrstea and Klepač and Internazionali Femminili di Palermo prevailing over Koryttseva and Kustova. They also reached the finals of the Swedish Open losing Pennetta and Dulko, and the Western & Southern Financial Group Women's Open losing to Black and Huber.

On October 12, the final qualifiers were Samantha Stosur and Rennae Stubbs.

Samantha Stosur and Rennae Stubbs were the only qualifying team not to ever win a title in 2009. However their runner-up finishes at the Aegon International losing to Sugiyama and Amanmuradova, Rogers Cup losing to Llagostera Vives and Martínez Sánchez, and Wimbledon losing to Serena and Venus helped them to qualify. They also reached the semifinals of US Open and the third rounds of Australian Open and French Open.

== Groupings ==
The stellar eight-woman line-up includes four players who have been No.1, three Grand Slam champions, and four who've been to at least one major final. Two of the field made their Top 10 debuts this season and are at the championships for the first time. Between them, they pocketed 21 of the 53 titles that were on offer during this landmark 'Roadmap' season. As last year, the competitors have been divided into two groups named for the colors of the Qatari flag. The White group comprises No.1 seed Dinara Safina, No.4 seed Caroline Wozniacki, No.6 seed Victoria Azarenka and No.8 seed Jelena Janković. The Maroon Group is made up of No.2 seed Serena Williams, No.3 seed Svetlana Kuznetsova, No.5 seed Elena Dementieva and No.7 seed Venus Williams. Last year's runner-up, Vera Zvonareva, and Agnieszka Radwańska wait in the wings as alternates.

At the White Group featured more fresh-faced players than the other group with none of them having won a Grand Slam. Each player's respective head-to-head records against one another is as follows: Dinara Safina is 8–4, Caroline Wozniacki is 1–5, Victoria Azarenka is 4-8 and Jelena Janković is 8–4. With Dinara Safina leading the group, she has a decent head-to-head with each player she is 1–0 against Wozniacki, with their only meeting coming from the Mutua Madrileña Madrid Open finals with Safina winning 6-2 6–4, She also has a very good record against Azarenka leading 4–1 with her only loss to Azarenka coming from this year's Indian Wells Open. They have also played 3 setters in their last 3 meetings. However Safina's record against Janković is 3-3 an even record with Janković winning their last meeting in the finals of Cincinnati 6-4 6–2. The next head-to-head features the two newcomers Azarenka and Wozniacki, which Azarenka has a slight lead of 2–1, with, winning their last two meetings. Like Safina, Janković has a good record against Wozniacki and Azarenka, she is 2–0 against Wozniacki, both matches having an interesting scoreline due to fact that Janković lost the first set in both meetings but eventually won the match. Janković is also 3–1 against Azarenka with Janković winning their last three matches and Azarenka's win dating back to 2006 in Miami.

The Maroon Group features more accomplished and veteran players with all of them reaching a Grand Slam final and 3 of them, aside from Dementieva, have won a Grand Slam at least twice. In their respective records reigning Australian Open and Wimbledon champion Serena Williams is 22–16, French Open champion Svetlana Kuznetsova is 12-12, Elena Dementieva is 10-21 and Venus Williams is 22–17. As their head-to-heads are broken down the leader of the Maroon Group, Serena, is the only one that has a winning record against each of her group mates. She is 5–2 against Kuznetsova, this year they met twice at the Australian Open which eventual champion Serena won and in the French Open which eventual champion Kuznetsova won. Serena is 6–4 against Dementieva and 2-2 this year with Dementieva's wins coming from Medibank International Sydney and Rogers, and Serena's victories coming from the Australian Open and their stellar match in the 2009 Wimbledon Championships. Serena is 11–10 against her sister Venus and 2–1 in the year. Venus won their first encounter of the year at the Dubai Tennis Championships with Serena winning their last two meetings in Miami and Wimbledon. Unlike Serena, Dementieva is on the losing side with her head-to-heads besides being 4–6 against Serena, she is also 4–6 against Kuznetsova, with Kuznetsova winning their only meeting this year in the Porsche Tennis Grand Prix and winning 4 of their last 5 meetings. Dementieva is also down against Venus 2–9 with Venus getting the upper hand 2-0 this year against Dementieva with wins in Dubai and Stanford. Adding to that Venus is in a 6 match winning streak against Dementieva with Dementieva's win dating back to 2004 in Miami. On the head-to-head between Kuznetsova and Venus, Kuznetsova leads it 4–3 with them splitting their last two meetings and with their last meeting dating back to March 2008 in Miami with Kuznetsova prevailing.

== Player head-to-heads ==
These are the head-to-heads as they approach the tournament.

		Safina	Serena	Kuznetsova	Wozniacki	Dementieva	Azarenka	Venus	Janković	Overall
1	(Russia) Dinara Safina		1–6	8–6	1–0	5–5	4–1	1–3	3–4	23–25
2	(United States) Serena Williams	6–1		6–2	2–0	7–4	3–1	13–10	4–3	41–21
3	(Russia) Svetlana Kuznetsova	6–8	2–6		2–2	7–4	4–1	4–4	5–4	30–29
4	(Denmark) Caroline Wozniacki	0–1	0–2	2–2		2–3	2–2	0–4	0–3	6–17
5	(Russia) Elena Dementieva	5–5	4–7	4–7	3–2		2–1	3–9	3–7	24–38
6	(Belarus) Victoria Azarenka	1–4	1–3	1–4	2–2	1–2		0–1	2–3	8–19
7	(United States) Venus Williams	3–1	10–13	4–4	4–0	9–3	1–0		4–5	35–26
8	(Serbia) Jelena Janković	4–3	3–4	4–5	4–0	7–3	3–2	5–4		30–21

== Prize money and points ==
The total prize money for the 2009 Sony Ericsson Championships is 4.5 million United States dollars.

Stage	Singles	Doubles^{1}	Points ^{3}
Champion	+$770,000	$375,000	+450
Runner-up	+$380,000	$187,500	+360
Round robin (3 wins)	$400,000	$93,750^{2}	690
Round robin (2 wins)	$300,000	-	530
Round robin (1 win)	$200,000	-	370
Round robin (0 wins)	$100,000	-	210
Alternates	$50,000	-	

- ^{1} Prize money for doubles is per team.
- ^{2} Prize money is for doubles semifinalists
- ^{3} for every match played in the round robin a player gets 70 points automatically, and for each round robin win they get 160 additional points

== Day-by-day summaries ==
=== Day 1 ===
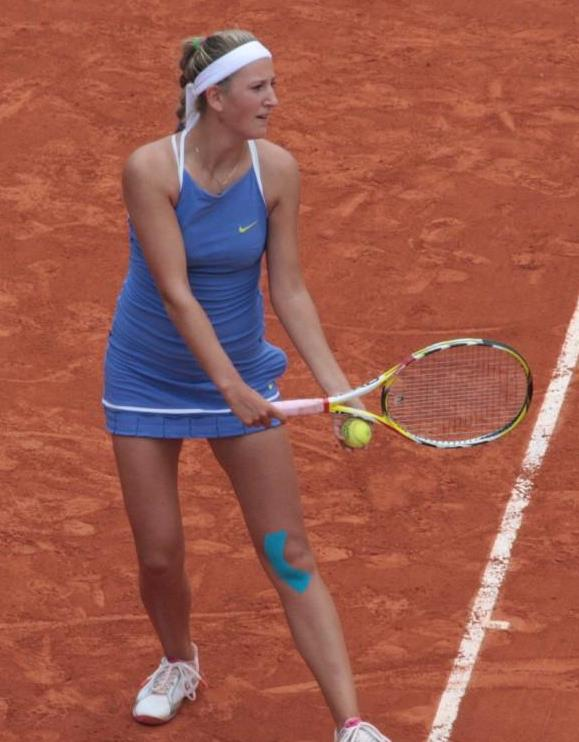
Victoria Azarenka wins her debut match

The action in the 2009 Year-end championship started in the White Group between debutant Victoria Azarenka and last year's semifinalist Jelena Janković.

Azarenka broke in the opening game. Janković finally got on the scoreboard in the third game. Azerenka broke for a second time in the seventh game and had no trouble serving out the set at 5–2. The early stages of the second set followed much the same path as the first as Azarenka broke in the third game. This time though the Serb did muster some kind of a fight and she broke back two games later. Azarenka immediately restored her second set advantage, before going on to save break points in the eighth game. Azarenka broke again to claim the set and match 6–3.

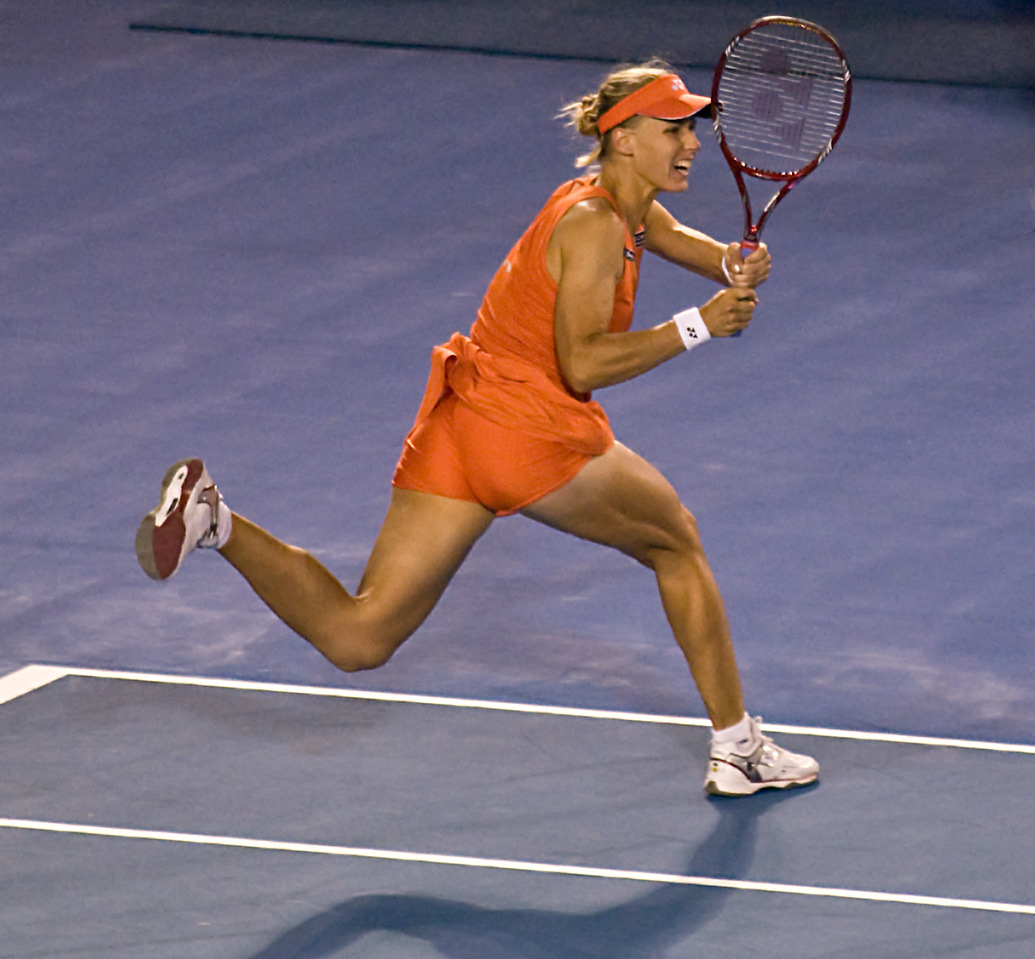
Elena Dementieva outlasts defending champion Venus

They were followed on court by the opening match in the Maroon Group. Where defending champion Venus Williams faced Elena Dementieva. The American grabbed the advantage by breaking in the second game. The rest of the set went with serve as Venus won it 6–3. The opening game of the 2nd set saw Dementiva save 3 break points, before being broken at the 4th opportunity. A battling hold in the third game, when she saved another break point. Dementieva then reeled off three games in a row. Venus recovered to break again in the 11th game, with Dementieva once again producing a double fault. But the Russian broke straight back. Dementieva sealed the set with a 4th break point when Venus produced double fault. The Russian broke in the first and third games of the final set. In the 6th game Venus had break points only for Dementieva to hold. The Russian clinched the match 2 games later.

The final match of the night was between the Wimbledon and Australian Open champion, Serena Williams, and the French Open champion, Svetlana Kuznetsova. Kuznetsova grabbed an early break, in the third game. But 3 games later and Serena was back on serve. The two players then traded breaks as Kutznetsova served for it. But the first set was to be decided on a tie-break. Serena saved two set points before sealing the set. The second set followed much the same pattern with Kuznetsova snatching the early break only to be pegged back by Serena once again. The Russian once again the broke in the fourth game before being broken straight back. Eventually it was Williams who lifted her level breaking for the lead in the 11th game before serving out the match taking the set 7–5.

Matches on Khalifa International Tennis and Squash Complex
Group	Winner	Loser	Score
White Group	(Belarus) Victoria Azarenka [6]	(Serbia) Jelena Janković [8]	6–2, 6–3
Maroon Group	(Russia) Elena Dementieva [5]	(United States) Venus Williams [7]	3–6, 7–6(6), 6–2
Maroon Group	(United States) Serena Williams [2]	(Russia) Svetlana Kuznetsova [3]	7–6(6), 7–5
1st match starts at 5:00 pm

=== Day 2 ===
The first match featured debutants Victoria Azarenka and Caroline Wozniacki. Azarenka, the No.6 seed at the season-ending event, lost the opening game of the match but won the next six straight. The 80-minute second set saw Azarenka fended off seven break points to hold serve after 20 minutes for a 3–2 lead. Wozniacki finally broke in the ninth game. Despite Azarenka holding break back points in the very next game, Wozniacki held her nerve to force a deciding set, albeit after a 10-minute break due to the heat rule. The break seemed to have benefited Azarenka as she broke in the second game. Azerenka promptly dropped her own serve and exchanging another two breaks of serve with Wozniacki before a seventh break of serve of the set left Azerenka serving for the match. Wozniacki broke back and broke again as Azerenka lost her cool. She receiving a warning for hitting a ball out of the stadium between points and then had a point deducted on break point for smashing her racquet. Wozniacki held her nerve to serve it out.

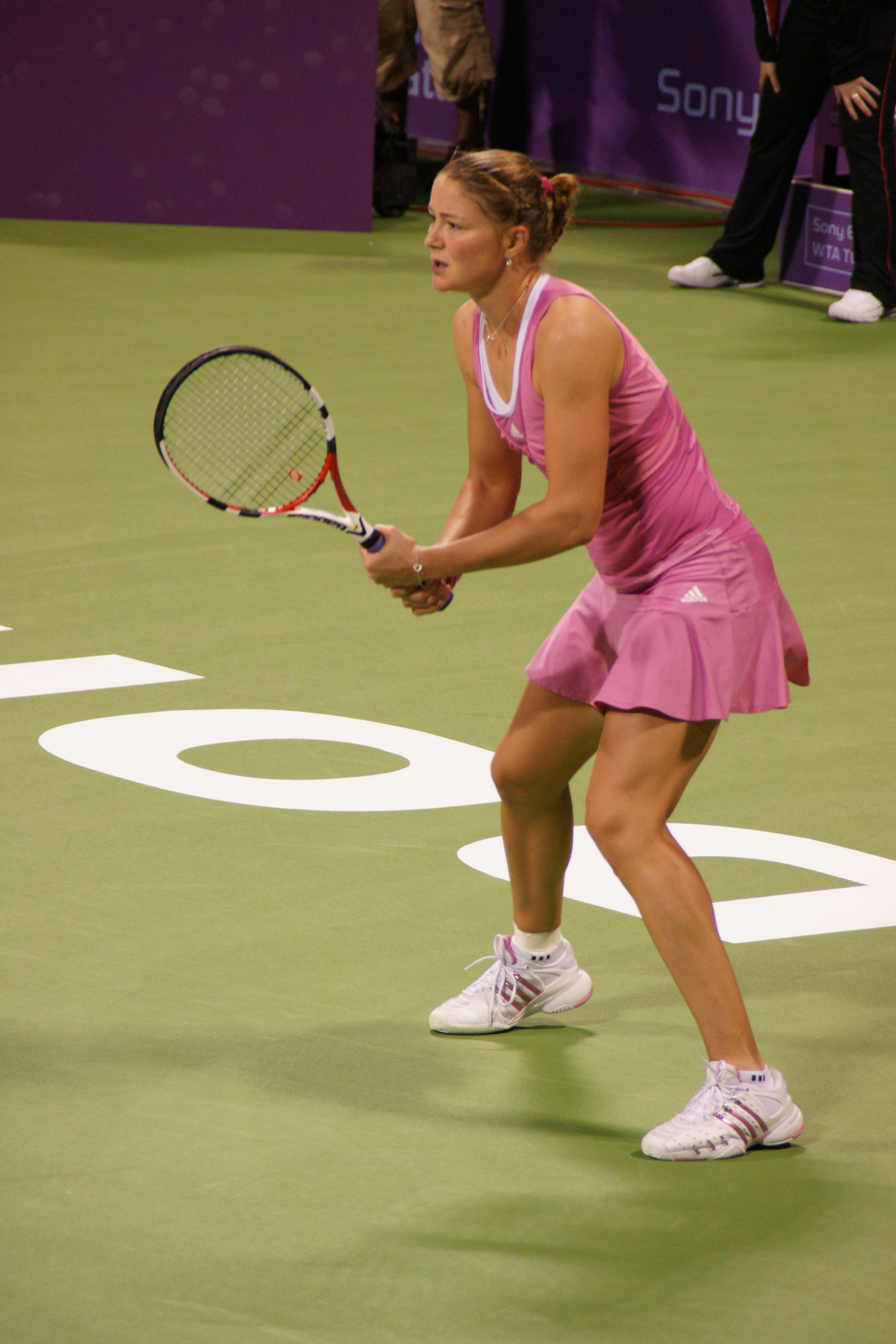
Dinara Safina surrenders the no. 1 ranking to Serena as she withdraws

In the second match of the day, top seed Dinara Safina had to withdraw 1-1 and 30–15 in the first set with Jelena Janković. After a lower back injury flared up, she was forced to quit in tears. She withdrew from the tournament and was replaced by Vera Zvonareva. Her withdrawal ensures that Serena Williams will be the year-end no. 1.

The main match featured a sister act as Serena Williams and Venus Williams went toe to toe in a tight 3 sets, lasting 160 minutes. Venus broke in the second game of the match. Venus, though, gave her younger sister the break back, with three double faults in the one game. But re-established the break in the fourth game. Serena broke back for a second time before the two players went on to exchange solid service holds. But it was only a temporary respite for Serena as Venus broke once again in the 12th game, sealing the set. Venus fell apart in the second, handing Serena a break in the opening game. Serena further extended her lead in the seventh game of the set when she broke again. Despite being broken back in the very next game, Serena won the set 6–4. The decider saw five out of the first six games going against serve. But despite Venus trailing for much of the set, and even serving to stay in it at 5-3 down it was she who first held a match point. Serena saved it with some ferocious hitting, before forcing the decisive tie-break. Serena took control, racing out to a 4–2 lead at the change of ends before sealing it with her first match point.

Matches on Khalifa International Tennis and Squash Complex
Group	Winner	Loser	Score
White Group	(Denmark) Caroline Wozniacki [4]	(Belarus) Victoria Azarenka [6]	1–6, 6–4, 7–5
White Group	(Serbia) Jelena Janković [8]	(Russia) Dinara Safina [1]	1–1 ret.
Maroon Group	(United States) Serena Williams [2]	(United States) Venus Williams [7]	5–7, 6–4, 7–6(4)
1st match starts at 5:00 pm

=== Day 3 ===
The first on court featured a marathon between Caroline Wozniacki and Safina's replacement Vera Zvonareva. Wozniacki, the No. 4 seed, won 11 of the first 13 games against Zvonareva. But the Russian summoned the form that took her to the final of the season finale a year ago, leveling up at a set all. And saving two match points at 5–6 in that set. After a 10-minute break due to the heat rule Wozniacki came out strong again, building a 3–1 lead in the third. Zvonareva then won three of the next four games to level at 4-4. But the Dane wasn't done, holding then breaking for 5-4 and fighting off severe cramps - and the subsequent tears - to serve it out.

Serena Williams remains undefeated in this year's championship

The second match saw Serena Williams pitting against Elena Dementieva. Dementieva, broke in the second game. But the American, who played with heavy strapping on her left thigh, broke back immediately, Serena then ran away with the first set, breaking again in the sixth and eighth games. Serena appeared to be running away with it early in the second set, breaking in the second game. The Russian, though, did manage to find some fight and broke back at the fifth attempt in the third game. The rest of the set went with serve, until Dementieva sent down her 10th double fault in the 10th game of the set to hand Serena three match points. The Russian saved the first two, before the American wrapped up the win at the third attempt 6-2 6–4. As a result, Serena booked her place in the Semifinals.

The final match saw defending champion Venus Williams and Svetlana Kuznetsova trying to win their first match of the tournament. The American grabbed the first break, in the fourth game, which is all she needed for the set, 6–2. The second set was much more competitive and this time it was the Russian who grabbed the early break. Despite holding break points Venus was forced to wait until the 10th game to break back. The set went to a tie-break. Kuznetsova won the tie-break ensuring a decisive third set. They traded early breaks. The American re-established her break lead in the ninth game and Kuznetsova saved two match points as Venus served for it. But Venus finally converted on the third time around after 2 hours and 28 minutes.

Matches on Khalifa International Tennis and Squash Complex
Group	Winner	Loser	Score
White Group	(Denmark) Caroline Wozniacki [4]	(Russia) Vera Zvonareva [ALT]	6–0, 6–7(3), 6–4
Maroon Group	(United States) Serena Williams [2]	(Russia) Elena Dementieva [5]	6–2, 6–4
Maroon Group	(United States) Venus Williams [7]	(Russia) Svetlana Kuznetsova [3]	6–2, 6–7(3), 6–4
1st match starts at 5:00 pm

=== Day 4 ===
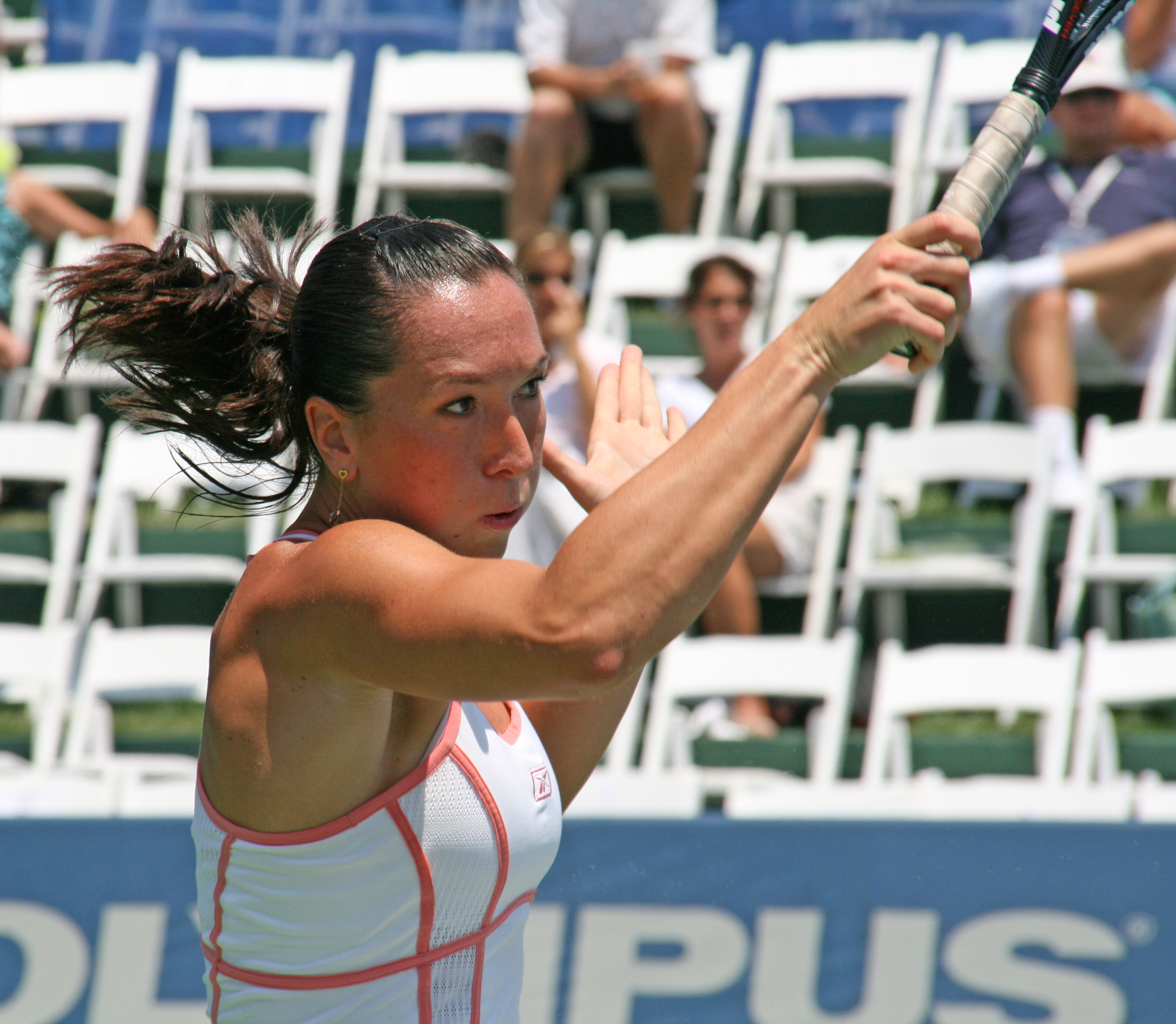
Jelena Janković won her match against Wozniacki to clinch a semifinal berth

The 1st match of the last day of the round robin stage featured Jelena Janković and Caroline Wozniacki. The result had several implications on the outcome of the group. A Janković win and she topped it with Wozniacki in 2nd with Azerenka having a chance to leap frog the pair of them later. This would squeeze Wozniacki out of the tournament. However a Wozniacki win would see her top with Azerenka going through, without having to play.

The first set saw Janković only lose 5 points on serve, and broke Wozniacki twice to take the set 6–2. The second set was much the same with Janković breaking 3 times. Wozniacki did offer some resistance breaking once, but could not prevent herself losing the set, 6–2. For a 6–2, 6–2 win for Janković and top place in the group.

The next match featured Russians Elena Dementieva and Svetlana Kuznetsova. Dementieva needed to win the match to clinch a berth or Venus Williams and Kuznetsova would end up level with her. With the American going through on the tie break situation, unless Dementieva won in straight sets. Kutznetsova was looking to end her 8 match losing streak at the Championships. With nothing left to play for but pride, Kuznetsova re-discovered the kind of form that took her to the Beijing title at the beginning of October. Dementieva, looked tense from the start and was forced to save a break point in the second game. It didn't take long for another opportunity to go Kutznetsova's way when in the sixth game when her opponent double faulted twice. Dementieva saved two set points in the eighth game but Kuznetsova made no mistake behind her own serve, sealing the set 6–2. The second set followed much the same pattern, with Kuznetsova breaking in the opening game. The French Open champion secured a second break of serve in the fifth game when Dementieva went wide, before serving the match out. This win ended Kuznetsova's 10 match-losing streak, since her first win at the 2006 championship. Venus advanced to the semifinals following this result.

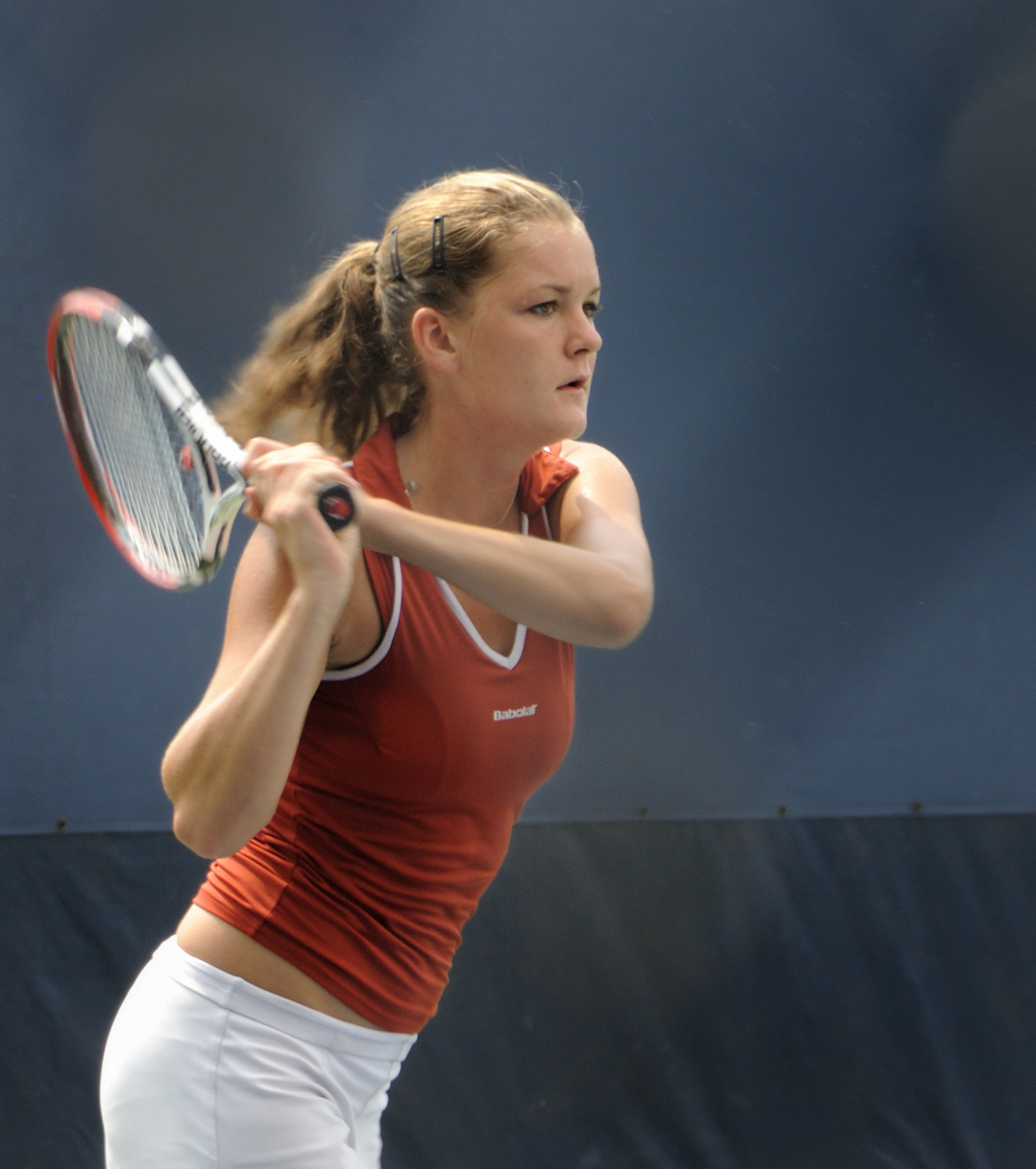
Agnieszka Radwańska defeated Azarenka, as good friend Wozniacki advance to the semifinals

The last match in the round robin stage featured Agnieszka Radwańska who replaced co-alternate Vera Zvonareva and Victoria Azarenka. Azarenka needed to win to clinch the last semifinal place or it would go to Wozniacki. Azarenka appeared to be cruising to the straight sets win that would have seen her top the white group when she took a 6-4 5–2 lead over Radwańska. After Azarenka broke in the opening game and although Radwańska broke back in the second game, the opening game set the tone as the Belarusian broke again in the 5th and 6th games to race out to a 5–2 lead. Azarenka did suffer a minor blip in concentration towards the end of the first set as she allowed Radwańska one of the breaks back, it was only a temporary lapse as the Belarusian served it out at the second attempt. Azarenka ran away with match in the early stages of the second set, breaking in the first and third games. But the Pole, refused to give up and was rewarded for her patience when she broke back in the sixth game. Azarenka recovered her composure by immediately breaking back and setting up a chance to serve out the match. But the Belarusian undid all her good work with consecutive double faults to hand momentum back to Radwańska. The Pole raced through the next five games to seal the second set and level the match. The match was just one game into the third set when Azarenka was forced to take a medical timeout to have her left thigh heavily strapped. Three games later Azarenka was break points down and in tears after trying to race up the court to a drop shot. The Belarusian saved the first break point, but again she was left sobbing and kneeling on the ground next before going on to double fault and hand her opponent the break. One more medical timeout and one and a half games later and Azarenka decided she could not continue. Radwańska won 4-6 7-5 4–1, Azarenka retired due to cramp. The result meant that Janković topped the group with Wozniacki the runner up.

Matches on Khalifa International Tennis and Squash Complex
Group	Winner	Loser	Score
White Group	(Serbia) Jelena Janković [8]	(Denmark) Caroline Wozniacki [4]	6–2, 6-2
Maroon Group	(Russia) Svetlana Kuznetsova [3]	(Russia) Elena Dementieva [5]	6-3, 6-2
White Group	(Poland) Agnieszka Radwańska [ALT]	(Belarus) Victoria Azarenka [6]	4-6, 7–5, 4-1 ret
1st match starts at 5:00 pm

=== Day 5 ===
The day was started with the first doubles semifinal. Pairing Cara Black & Liezel Huber and Samantha Stosur & Rennae Stubbs against each other. The first set saw Stosur and Stubbs in take an earlybreak and with it the set 6–3. The second looked liked it was going away of Black and Huber when they were 5-2 up and had two set points. However Stosur and Stubbs held on and won the next 3 games to push it to a tie-break. Which Black and Huber won 7–3. The match was decided by a champions tie-break. Black and Huber cruised into an 8–3 lead. Only for Stosur and Stubbs to fight back, in vain as they lost the tie break 10–8. This win meant that Black and Huber had secured the year-end no. 1.

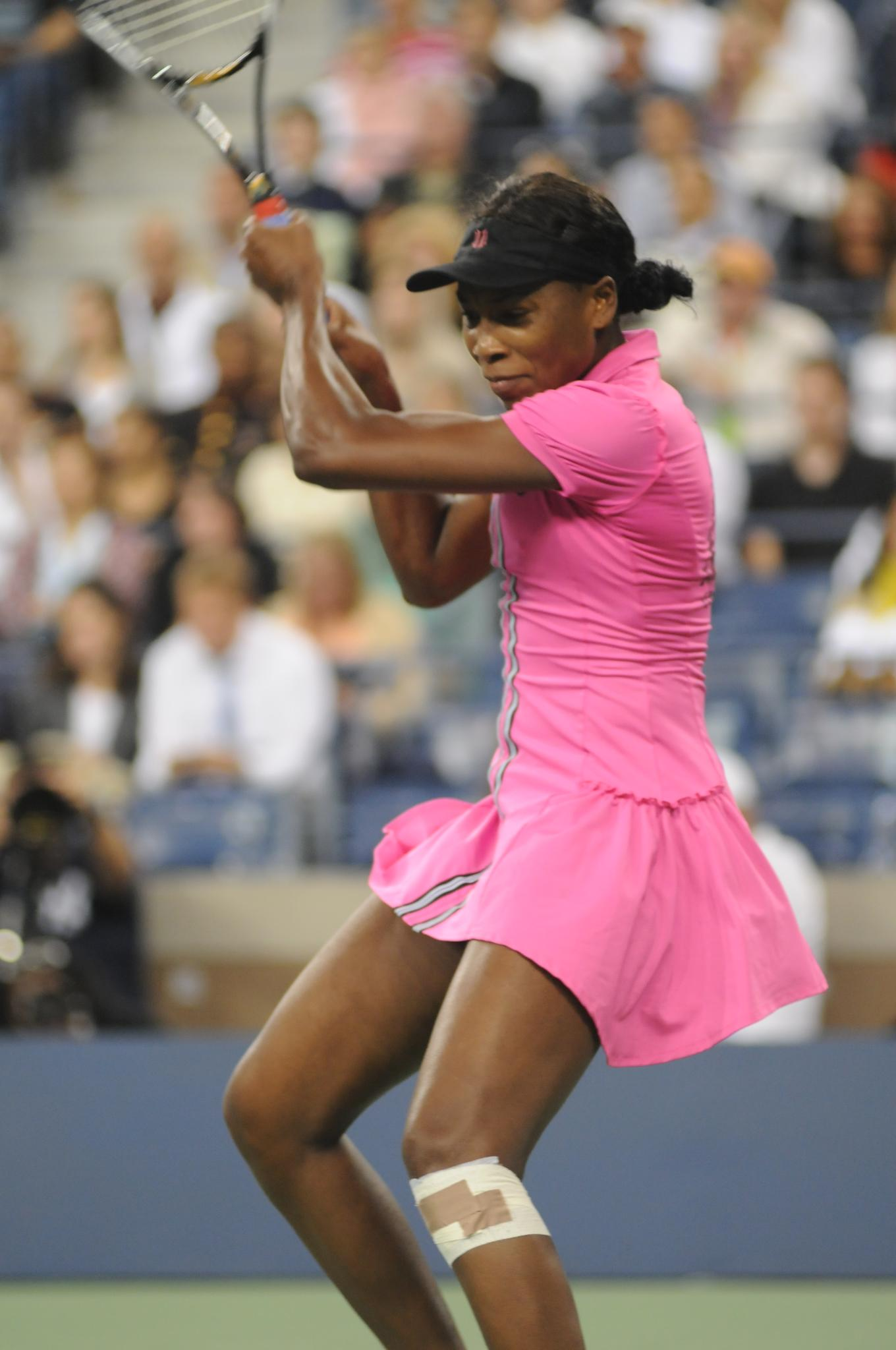
Defending champion Venus Williams outlast Janković to advance to second straight finals

The second match featured the first singles semifinal, meeting the champion of white group, Jelena Janković and the runner up of maroon group, Venus Williams. Janković broke early, however Venus broke back to level the set 3-3, it was not until the 11th game of the 1st set that Janković broke the Venus serve again and eventually closed the set 7–5. The second set saw Venus facing three break points in the 5th game, wherein Venus delivered 2 double faults, but held on as Janković faltered. The Serb then saved two break points in the next game but Venus seized her chance when the a third opportunity arose breaking the Janković serve, pounding away a forehand. It was enough for Venus to level the match. The third set saw Janković take an early lead as she rallied to a 2–0 lead only for Venus to take the next 3 games. Janković then fought back and broke to level it at 3-3, only for Venus to reestablish the break. Venus served at 5-4 for the match. After 2 hours 34 minutes, Venus clinched it 5–7, 6–3, 6–4 to make her second consecutive final in the tournament. This win continues Venus success in the championship as she has never lost before the semifinals.

Following, the second singles semifinal took place, meeting the champion of maroon group and undefeated, Serena Williams and the runner up of white group, Caroline Wozniacki. The first set saw 7 break of serve with Serena breaking serve 4 times to Wozniacki's 3. Serena eventually closed the set 6–4. In the second set, Wozniacki broke in the opening game. Wozniacki's body finally gave up though at the end of the game, the Dane retired from the match citing abdominal injury. Serena advanced to the final where she will meet her sister, Venus, for the second time in the week.

The last doubles semifinal was then played between the Williams sister's Serena and Venus and the Spanish duo of Nuria Llagostera Vives and María José Martínez Sánchez. The first set saw both team holding serve up until 2-2 when the Williams sister won the next four games to close the set 6–2. The second set saw the Spanish team breaking Venus' serve early and that was all they needed as they won the set 6–4. In the champions tie-break the Williams sister's trailed 6-3 but gutted out some long points to claw back to 8-8. From there the Spaniards' teamship shone, as Llagostera Vives poached a backhand volley for 9-8 and Martínez Sánchez hit a forehand volley winner to seal the deal.

Matches on Khalifa International Tennis and Squash Complex
Group	Winner	Loser	Score
Doubles - Semifinals	(Zimbabwe) Cara Black [1] (United States) Liezel Huber [1]	(Australia) Samantha Stosur [4] (Australia) Rennae Stubbs [4]	3–6, 7-6(3), [10-8]
Singles - Semifinals ^{1}	(United States) Venus Williams [7]	(Serbia) Jelena Janković [8]	5–7, 6–3, 6-4
Singles - Semifinals	(United States) Serena Williams [2]	(Denmark) Caroline Wozniacki [4]	6–4, 0-1 ret
Doubles - Semifinals ^{2}	(Spain) Nuria Llagostera Vives [3] (Spain) María José Martínez Sánchez [3]	(United States) Serena Williams [2] (United States) Venus Williams [2]	2–6, 6–4, [10-8]
1st match starts at 2:00 pm^{1} Not before 4:30 pm^{2} Not before 7:30 pm / after suitable rest

=== Day 6 ===
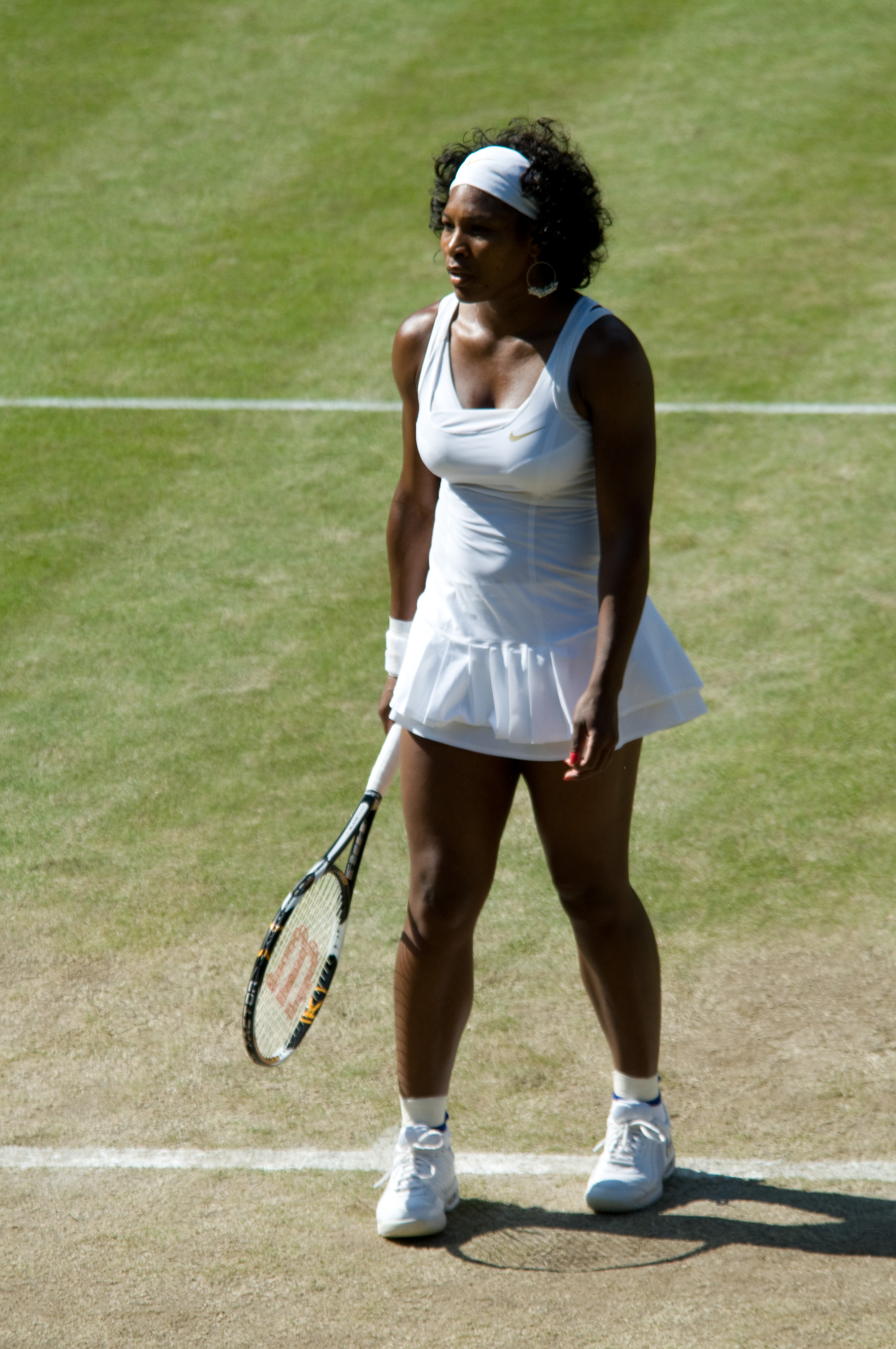
Serena Williams wins her second year-end championship

The last day saw another showdown between Serena Williams and defending champion Venus Williams for the title. Serena progressed to the finals undefeated; beating, Elena Dementieva, Svetlana Kuznetsova and Venus in the group stage. Before defeating Caroline Wozniacki in the semifinals. Venus progressed to the finals after having a bad start, losing close three setters to Serena and Dementieva, whilst defeating Kuznetsova. Venus received a lucky break as Dementieva lost to Kuznetsova, tying all 3 players with Venus winning and progressing to the semifinals. Venus progressed to the final when she defeated Jelena Janković. Serena held the lifetime match record at 12–10 against Venus; coming into the final. With Serena winning their last 3 meetings. The first set saw Serena as dominate as she lost only 4 points on serve. Serena took advantage of her sister's poor service game converting two of six break points in the 3rd and 7th game to take the first set 6–2. The 2nd set featured no break point opportunities as it came down to a tie-break. In the tie-break Serena got the mini-break on the first point and rallied to a 5–1 lead only to see Venus cut it back to 5–4, but Serena won the tie-break 7-4 and the title. This win meant that Serena was the first player female to surpass the 6 million mark.

The doubles finals was followed featuring Year-end no. 1's Cara Black and Liezel Huber taking on the Spanish duo of Nuria Llagostera Vives and María José Martínez Sánchez. Both teams won their semi-final match through a Champions tie-break, 10–8. Black and Huber defeated Stosur and Stubbs while Llagostera Vives and Martínez Sánchez defeated the Williams sisters. The 1st set saw 3 breaks a piece to send it to a tie-break that went to the Spanish duo 7–0. The second set saw the world no. 1's strike back 7–5. As in the semifinals this went to a champions tie-break which the Spanish duo won by 10–7. This ended their 6 match losing streak against the Zimbabwean-American duo; making it seventh time lucky to win their biggest title. Edging the world No.1s, 7-6(0) 5-7 10–7.

Matches on Khalifa International Tennis and Squash Complex
Group	Champion	Runner up	Score
Singles - Final	(United States) Serena Williams [2]	(United States) Venus Williams [7]	6–2, 7-6(4)
Doubles - Final	(Spain) Nuria Llagostera Vives [3] (Spain) María José Martínez Sánchez [3]	(Zimbabwe) Cara Black [1] (United States) Liezel Huber [1]	7-6(0), 5–7, [10-7]
1st match starts at 6:00 pm

== Race to the championships ==
=== Singles ===
Those with a gold background have enough points to qualify.

Rank	Athlete	Grand Slam tournament				Premier Mandatory				Best Premier 5		Best other						Total points	Tourn
Rank	Athlete	AUS	FRA	WIM	USO	IW	MIA	MAD	BEI	1	2	1	2	3	4	5	6	Total points	Tourn
1	(Russia) Dinara Safina	F 1400	F 1400	SF; 900	R32; 160	QF; 250	R32; 80	W 1000	R32; 80	W 800	F 550	F 320	F 320	W 280	SF; 130	R16; 60	R32; 1	7,731	18
2	(United States) Serena Williams	W 2000	QF; 500	W 2000	SF; 900	A 0	F 700	R64; 5	R16; 140	SF; 350	SF; 350	SF; 200	SF; 200	R16; 110	QF; 120	R32; 1	R32; 1	7,576	17
3	(Russia) Svetlana Kuznetsova	QF; 500	W 2000	R32; 160	R16; 280	R64; 5	SF; 450	R32; 5	W 1000	F 550	R16; 110	W 470	QF; 120	QF; 120	R32; 1	R32; 1	R32; 1	5,772	18
4	(Denmark) Caroline Wozniacki	R32; 160	R32; 160	R16; 280	F 1400	QF; 250	QF; 250	F 700	R64; 5	QF; 200	R16; 110	W 470	W 470	F 320	W 280	F 200	F 200	5,475	24
5	(Russia) Elena Dementieva	SF; 900	R32; 160	SF; 900	R64; 100	R64; 5	R16; 140	R16; 140	QF; 250	W 800	SF; 350	W 470	F 320	W 280	QF; 200	SF; 200	SF; 200	5,415	19
6	(Belarus) Victoria Azarenka	R16; 280	QF; 500	QF; 500	R32; 160	SF; 450	W 1000	R16; 140	R32; 80	SF; 350	QF; 200	W 280	W 280	R16; 110	R16; 60	R32; 60	R32; 1	4,451	16
7	(United States) Venus Williams	R64; 100	R32; 160	F 1400	R16; 280	A 0	SF; 450	R32; 5	R32; 80	W 800	SF; 350	F 320	W 280	R16; 110	R16; 60	R32; 1	R32; 1	4,397	16
8	(Serbia) Jelena Janković	R16; 280	R16; 280	R32; 160	R64; 100	R64; 5	R64; 5	QF; 250	R32; 5	W 800	F 550	W 280	QF; 200	QF; 200	SF; 200	QF; 120	QF; 120	3,555	18
9	(Russia) Vera Zvonareva	SF; 900	A 0	R32; 160	R16; 280	W 1000	R32; 80	A 0	QF; 250	QF; 200	R16; 110	W 280	QF; 120	R16; 110	R16; 60	R16; 60	R32; 1	3,550	19
10	(Poland) Agnieszka Radwańska	R128; 5	R16; 280	QF; 500	R64; 100	QF; 250	R16; 140	R64; 5	F 700	SF; 350	QF; 200	QF; 200	SF; 130	QF; 120	QF; 120	QF; 120	QF; 120	3,340	22
