= 2009 Toray Pan Pacific Open – Singles =

Singles
- 2009 Toray Pan Pacific Open

Final
- Champion: (Russia) Maria Sharapova
- Runner-up: (Serbia) Jelena Janković
- Score: 5–2, ret.

Details
- Draw: 56 (8 Q / 3 WC )
- Seeds: 16

Events
Singles	Doubles
← 2008 ·	Pan Pacific Open	· 2010 →

Maria Sharapova won the singles tennis title at the 2009 Pan Pacific Open after Jelena Janković retired from the final with a wrist injury, with the scoreline at 5–2.

Dinara Safina was the defending champion, but lost to Chang Kai-chen in the second round.

== Seeds ==
The top eight seeds received a bye into the second round.

1. (Russia) Dinara Safina (second round)
2. (United States) Venus Williams (second round)
3. (Russia) Elena Dementieva (second round)
4. (Denmark) Caroline Wozniacki (second round, retired due to viral illness)
5. (Russia) Svetlana Kuznetsova (second round)
6. (Russia) Vera Zvonareva (second round)
7. (Serbia) Jelena Janković (final, retired due to wrist injury)
8. (Belarus) Victoria Azarenka (quarterfinals)
9. (Italy) Flavia Pennetta (first round)
10. (Serbia) Ana Ivanovic (first round)
11. (Poland) Agnieszka Radwańska (semifinals)
12. (Australia) Samantha Stosur (second round)
13. (Russia) Nadia Petrova (second round)
14. (France) Marion Bartoli (quarterfinals)
15. (China) Li Na (semifinals)
16. (France) Virginie Razzano (first round)

== Draw ==
=== Key ===
- Q = Qualifier
- WC = Wild card
- LL = Lucky loser
- Alt = Alternate
- ITF = ITF entry
- PR = Protected ranking
- SR = Special ranking
- SE = Special exempt
- JE = Junior exempt
- JR = Junior Accelerator Programme entrant
- CO = College Accelerator Programme entrant
- NG = Next Gen Accelerator Program entrant
- w/o = Walkover
- r = Retired
- d = Defaulted

=== Finals ===
Quarterfinals
(Czech Republic) Iveta Benešová	4	5
(Russia) Maria Sharapova	6	7
(Slovakia) Magdaléna Rybáriková	3	1
11	(Poland) Agnieszka Radwańska	6	6
8	(Belarus) Victoria Azarenka	6^{7}	6	6^{4}
15	(China) Li Na	7^{9}	4	7^{7}
7	(Serbia) Jelena Janković	6	6
14	(France) Marion Bartoli	4	3

Semifinals
(Russia) Maria Sharapova	6	2	6
11	(Poland) Agnieszka Radwańska	3	6	4
15	(China) Li Na	4	3
7	(Serbia) Jelena Janković	6	6

Final
(Russia) Maria Sharapova	5
7	(Serbia) Jelena Janković	2^{r}

=== Top half ===
==== Section 1 ====
First round
Q	(Chinese Taipei) K-c Chang	6	6
(Estonia) K Kanepi	3	3
(Hungary) Á Szávay	3	0
(Argentina) G Dulko	6	6
(Czech Republic) I Benešová	3	7^{7}	6
16	(France) V Razzano	6	6^{5}	0
12	(Australia) S Stosur	7	6
Q	(United States) A Glatch	5	0
(Italy) F Schiavone	6	5	1
(Russia) M Sharapova	4	7	6
(Russia) A Kleybanova	6	6
WC	(Japan) A Morita	1	4

Second round
1/WC	(Russia) D Safina	6^{5}	6	5
Q	(Chinese Taipei) K-c Chang	7^{7}	4	7
(Argentina) G Dulko	3	6	4
(Czech Republic) I Benešová	6	3	6
12	(Australia) S Stosur	0	1
(Russia) M Sharapova	6	6
(Russia) A Kleybanova	3	6	6
6	(Russia) V Zvonareva	6	4	2

Third round
Q	(Chinese Taipei) K-c Chang	5	2
(Czech Republic) I Benešová	7	6
(Russia) M Sharapova	2	6	6
(Russia) A Kleybanova	6	2	2

Quarterfinals
(Czech Republic) I Benešová	4	5
(Russia) M Sharapova	6	7

==== Section 2 ====
First round
(Canada) A Wozniak	5	7^{7}	6
WC	(Japan) K Date-Krumm	7	6^{2}	4
Q	(Poland) U Radwańska	4	4
(Slovakia) M Rybáriková	6	6
WC	(Japan) A Sugiyama	0	1	r
13	(Russia) N Petrova	6	2
11	(Poland) A Radwańska	7	6
(Russia) E Makarova	5	3
(Slovakia) D Hantuchová	6	6
Q	(United States) J Craybas	3	3
Q	(Germany) A Petkovic	7	6
(Austria) S Bammer	5	4

Second round
4	(Denmark) C Wozniacki	0	r
(Canada) A Wozniak	5
(Slovakia) M Rybáriková	6	6
13	(Russia) N Petrova	2	2
11	(Poland) A Radwańska	6	3	6
(Slovakia) D Hantuchová	3	6	3
Q	(Germany) A Petkovic	7	4	6
5	(Russia) S Kuznetsova	5	6	3

Third round
(Canada) A Wozniak	6	3	3
(Slovakia) M Rybáriková	1	6	6
11	(Poland) A Radwańska	6	3	6
Q	(Germany) A Petkovic	4	6	3

Quarterfinals
(Slovakia) M Rybáriková	3	1
11	(Poland) A Radwańska	6	6

=== Bottom half ===
==== Section 3 ====
First round
Q	(India) S Mirza	7	2	3
(China) J Zheng	5	6	6
(China) S Peng	6	6
(Spain) A Medina Garrigues	3	3
(Czech Republic) L Šafářová	6	7^{7}
10	(Serbia) A Ivanovic	4	6^{1}
15	(China) N Li	6	6
(France) A Cornet	4	0
(Russia) V Dushevina	1	7	6
(Ukraine) A Bondarenko	6	5	1
Q	(Ukraine) K Bondarenko	6	6
(Germany) A-L Grönefeld	3	1

Second round
8	(Belarus) V Azarenka	6	6
(China) J Zheng	1	1
(China) S Peng	3	6	4
(Czech Republic) L Šafářová	6	4	6
15	(China) N Li	7	6
(Russia) V Dushevina	5	0
Q	(Ukraine) K Bondarenko	6	6^{3}	6
3	(Russia) E Dementieva	2	7^{7}	1

Third round
8	(Belarus) V Azarenka	7	6
(Czech Republic) L Šafářová	5	4
15	(China) N Li	2	7	6
Q	(Ukraine) K Bondarenko	6	5	3

Quarterfinals
8	(Belarus) V Azarenka	6^{7}	6	6^{4}
15	(China) N Li	7^{9}	4	7^{7}

==== Section 4 ====
First round
(Germany) S Lisicki	6	6
(Switzerland) P Schnyder	4	0
(Russia) E Vesnina	6	6
(Spain) MJ Martínez Sánchez	3	2
(Italy) R Vinci	6	6
9	(Italy) F Pennetta	1	2
14	(France) M Bartoli	6	6
(Romania) S Cîrstea	3	0
(Italy) S Errani	2	2
(France) A Rezaï	6	6
Q	(Russia) A Pavlyuchenkova	6	7^{7}
(Spain) C Suárez Navarro	1	6^{3}

Second round
7	(Serbia) J Janković	6	4	6
(Germany) S Lisicki	3	6	2
(Russia) E Vesnina	6	7^{8}
(Italy) R Vinci	1	6^{6}
14	(France) M Bartoli	6	6
(France) A Rezaï	4	2
Q	(Russia) A Pavlyuchenkova	7^{8}	7
2	(United States) V Williams	6^{6}	5

Third round
7	(Serbia) J Janković	6	3
(Russia) E Vesnina	1	0	r
14	(France) M Bartoli	4	6	7
Q	(Russia) A Pavlyuchenkova	6	2	5

Quarterfinals
7	(Serbia) J Janković	6	6
14	(France) M Bartoli	4	3
