= 2009 WTA Tour Championships – Singles =

Singles
- 2009 WTA Tour Championships

Final
- Champion: (United States) Serena Williams
- Runner-up: (United States) Venus Williams
- Score: 6–2, 7–6^{(7–4)}

Details
- Draw: 8 (RR + elimination)
- Seeds: 8

Events
Singles	Doubles
- WTA Tour Championships

Serena Williams defeated the defending champion, her sister Venus Williams, in the final, 6–2, 7–6^{(7–4)} to win the singles title. It was her second Tour Finals singles title in eight years. Serena remained undefeated throughout the tournament, despite being match point down against Venus in their round robin match.

Caroline Wozniacki and Victoria Azarenka made their debuts at the event.

Dinara Safina and Serena Williams were in the contention of year-end no. 1 ranking. Williams secured the year-end no. 1 ranking for the second time when Safina withdrew from the tournament.

== Players ==
1. (Russia) Dinara Safina (round robin, retired/withdrew due to a back injury)
2. (United States) Serena Williams (champion)
3. (Russia) Svetlana Kuznetsova (round robin)
4. (Denmark) Caroline Wozniacki (semifinals, retired due to a left abdominal strain)
5. (Russia) Elena Dementieva (round robin)
6. (Belarus) Victoria Azarenka (round robin, retired due to cramping)
7. (United States) Venus Williams (final)
8. (Serbia) Jelena Janković (semifinals)

== Alternates ==
1. (Russia) Vera Zvonareva (replaced Safina) (round robin, withdrew due to ankle injury)
2. (Poland) Agnieszka Radwańska (replaced Zvonareva) (round robin)

== Draw ==
Key

- Q = Qualifier
- WC = Wild card
- LL = Lucky loser
- Alt = Alternate
- ITF = ITF entry
- PR = Protected ranking
- SR = Special ranking
- SE = Special exempt
- JE = Junior exempt
- JR = Junior Accelerator Programme entrant
- CO = College Accelerator Programme entrant
- NG = Next Gen Accelerator Program entrant
- w/o = Walkover
- r = Retired
- d = Defaulted

=== Finals ===
Semifinals
8	(Serbia) Jelena Janković	7	3	4
7	(United States) Venus Williams	5	6	6
2	(United States) Serena Williams	6	0
4	(Denmark) Caroline Wozniacki	4	1^{r}

Final
7	(United States) Venus Williams	2	6^{4}
2	(United States) Serena Williams	6	7^{7}

=== White group ===
		(Russia) Safina (Russia) Zvonareva (Poland) Radwańska	(Denmark) Wozniacki	(Belarus) Azarenka	(Serbia) Janković	RR; W–L	Set; W–L	Game; W–L	Standings
1 Alt; Alt	(Russia) Dinara Safina (Russia) Vera Zvonareva (Poland) Agnieszka Radwańska		0–6, 7–6^{(7-3)}, 4–6 (w/ Zvonareva)	4–6, 7–5, 4–1, ret. (w/ Radwańska)	1–1, ret. (w/ Safina)	0–1; 0–1; 1–0	0–0 ( – ) 1–2 (33%); 2–1 (67%)	1–1 (50%); 11–18 (38%); 17–12 (59%)	X X 4
4	(Denmark) Caroline Wozniacki	6–0, 6–7^{(3–7)}, 6–4 (w/ Zvonareva)		1–6, 6–4, 7–5	2–6, 2–6	2–1	4–4 (50%)	36–38 (49%)	2
6	(Belarus) Victoria Azarenka	6–4, 5–7, 1–4, ret. (w/ Radwańska)	6–1, 4–6, 5–7		6–2, 6–3	1–2	4–4 (50%)	39–36 (52%)	3
8	(Serbia) Jelena Janković	1–1, ret. (w/ Safina)	6–2, 6–2	2–6, 3–6		2–1	2–2 (50%)	18–17 (51%)	1

Standings are determined by: 1. number of wins; 2. number of matches; 3. in two-players-ties, head-to-head records; 4. in three-players-ties, percentage of sets won, or of games won; 5. steering-committee decision.

=== Maroon group ===
		(United States) S Williams	(Russia) Kuznetsova	(Russia) Dementieva	(United States) V Williams	RR; W–L	Set; W–L	Game; W–L	Standings
2	(United States) Serena Williams		7–6^{(8–6)}, 7–5	6–2, 6–4	5–7, 6–4, 7–6^{(7–4)}	3–0	6–1 (86%)	44–34 (56%)	1
3	(Russia) Svetlana Kuznetsova	6–7^{(6–8)}, 5–7		6–3, 6–2	2–6, 7–6^{(7–3)}, 4–6	1–2	3–4 (43%)	36–37 (49%)	3
5	(Russia) Elena Dementieva	2–6, 4–6	3–6, 2–6		3–6, 7–6^{(8–6)}, 6–2	1–2	2–5 (29%)	27–38 (42%)	4
7	(United States) Venus Williams	7–5, 4–6, 6–7^{(4–7)}	6–2, 6–7^{(3–7)}, 6–4	6–3, 6–7^{(6–8)}, 2–6		1–2	4–5 (44%)	49–47 (51%)	2

Standings are determined by: 1. number of wins; 2. number of matches; 3. in two-players-ties, head-to-head records; 4. in three-players-ties, percentage of sets won, or of games won; 5. steering-committee decision.

== See also ==
- WTA Tour Championships appearances
