= 2009 Toray Pan Pacific Open – Doubles =

Doubles
- 2009 Toray Pan Pacific Open

Final
- Champions: (Russia) Alisa Kleybanova (Italy) Francesca Schiavone
- Runners-up: (Slovakia) Daniela Hantuchová (Japan) Ai Sugiyama
- Score: 6–4, 6–2

Details
- Draw: 16
- Seeds: 4

Events
Singles	Doubles
← 2008 ·	Toray Pan Pacific Open	· 2010 →

Vania King and Nadia Petrova were the defending champions, both of them were present this year, but played with different partners. King partnered with Zheng Jie and Petrova partnered with Gisela Dulko both lost to Daniela Hantuchová and Ai Sugiyama, in the first round and the semifinals respectively.
Alisa Kleybanova and Francesca Schiavone won in the final 6–4, 6–2 against Daniela Hantuchová and Ai Sugiyama.

== Seeds ==
1. (Zimbabwe) Cara Black / (United States) Liezel Huber (semifinals)
2. (Spain) Anabel Medina Garrigues / (Spain) Virginia Ruano Pascual (quarterfinals)
3. (Australia) Samantha Stosur / (Australia) Rennae Stubbs (first round)
4. (Spain) Nuria Llagostera Vives / (Spain) María José Martínez Sánchez (first round)

== Draw ==
=== Key ===
- Q = Qualifier
- WC = Wild card
- LL = Lucky loser
- Alt = Alternate
- ITF = ITF entry
- PR = Protected ranking
- SR = Special ranking
- SE = Special exempt
- JE = Junior exempt
- JR = Junior Accelerator Programme entrant
- CO = College Accelerator Programme entrant
- NG = Next Gen Accelerator Program entrant
- w/o = Walkover
- r = Retired
- d = Defaulted

=== Draw ===
First round
1	(Zimbabwe) C Black (United States) L Huber	7	4	[10]
WC	(Belarus) V Azarenka (Russia) S Kuznetsova	5	6	[7]
(Chinese Taipei) C-J Chuang (China) Z Yan	2	4
(Italy) F Pennetta (United States) L Raymond	6	6
3	(Australia) S Stosur (Australia) R Stubbs	2	6^{3}
(Russia) A Kleybanova (Italy) F Schiavone	6	7
(Germany) A-L Grönefeld (Switzerland) P Schnyder	4	5
(Russia) M Kirilenko (Russia) E Vesnina	6	7
(Argentina) G Dulko (Russia) N Petrova	7	3	[10]
WC	(Chinese Taipei) Y-J Chan (Japan) K Date-Krumm	5	6	[7]
(Chinese Taipei) S-W Hsieh (United States) R Kops-Jones	7	6
4	(Spain) N Llagostera Vives (Spain) MJ Martínez Sánchez	5	4
(United States) V King (China) J Zheng	4	6	[8]
(Slovakia) D Hantuchová (Japan) A Sugiyama	6	3	[10]
(Russia) V Dushevina (Russia) E Makarova	6	5	[6]
2	(Spain) A Medina Garrigues (Spain) V Ruano Pascual	3	7	[10]

Quarterfinals
1	(Zimbabwe) C Black (United States) L Huber	6	7
(Italy) F Pennetta (United States) L Raymond	2	6^{2}
(Russia) A Kleybanova (Italy) F Schiavone	w/o
(Russia) M Kirilenko (Russia) E Vesnina
(Argentina) G Dulko (Russia) N Petrova	6	4	[10]
(Chinese Taipei) S-W Hsieh (United States) R Kops-Jones	3	6	[4]
(Slovakia) D Hantuchová (Japan) A Sugiyama	7	3	[10]
2	(Spain) A Medina Garrigues (Spain) V Ruano Pascual	6^{5}	6	[7]

Semifinals
1	(Zimbabwe) C Black (United States) L Huber	6^{5}	3
(Russia) A Kleybanova (Italy) F Schiavone	7	6
(Argentina) G Dulko (Russia) N Petrova	6^{4}	5
(Slovakia) D Hantuchová (Japan) A Sugiyama	7	7

Final
(Russia) A Kleybanova (Italy) F Schiavone	6	6
(Slovakia) D Hantuchová (Japan) A Sugiyama	4	2
