= 2010 Toray Pan Pacific Open – Doubles =

Doubles
- 2010 Toray Pan Pacific Open

Final
- Champion: (Czech Republic) Iveta Benešová (Czech Republic) Barbora Záhlavová-Strýcová
- Runner-up: (Israel) Shahar Pe'er (China) Peng Shuai
- Score: 6–4, 4–6, [10–8]

Details
- Draw: 16
- Seeds: 4

Events
Singles	Doubles
← 2009 ·	Toray Pan Pacific Open	· 2011 →

Alisa Kleybanova and Francesca Schiavone were the defending champions. Both were present, but competed with different partners.
Kleybanova competed with Hsieh Su-wei, but lost in the first round to Benešová and Záhlavová-Strýcová, while Schiavone competed with Tathiana Garbin, however withdrew before their quarterfinal match against Lisa Raymond and Rennae Stubbs.
Iveta Benešová and Barbora Záhlavová-Strýcová defeated Shahar Pe'er and Peng Shuai 6–4, 4–6, [10–8] in the final.

== Seeds ==
1. (Argentina) Gisela Dulko / (Italy) Flavia Pennetta (quarterfinals)
2. (Czech Republic) Květa Peschke / (Slovenia) Katarina Srebotnik (quarterfinals)
3. (Chinese Taipei) Chan Yung-jan / (United States) Liezel Huber (semifinals)
4. (United States) Vania King / (Kazakhstan) Yaroslava Shvedova (first round)

== Draw ==
=== Key ===
- Q = Qualifier
- WC = Wild card
- LL = Lucky loser
- Alt = Alternate
- ITF = ITF entry
- PR = Protected ranking
- SR = Special ranking
- SE = Special exempt
- JE = Junior exempt
- JR = Junior Accelerator Programme entrant
- CO = College Accelerator Programme entrant
- NG = Next Gen Accelerator Program entrant
- w/o = Walkover
- r = Retired
- d = Defaulted

=== Draw ===
First round
1	(Argentina) G Dulko (Italy) F Pennetta	6	7
WC	(Japan) K Date-Krumm (Japan) A Morita	2	5
(Italy) S Errani (Spain) A Medina Garrigues	2	4
(Israel) S Pe'er (China) S Peng	6	6
3	(Chinese Taipei) Y-j Chan (United States) L Huber	6	4	[10]
(Germany) J Görges (Australia) A Rodionova	0	6	[2]
(Switzerland) T Bacsinszky (Italy) R Vinci	7	3	[9]
WC	(Belarus) V Azarenka (Russia) D Safina	5	6	[11]
(Spain) N Llagostera Vives (Spain) MJ Martínez Sánchez	5	1
(United States) L Raymond (Australia) R Stubbs	7	6
(Italy) T Garbin (Italy) F Schiavone	7	6
4	(United States) V King (Kazakhstan) Y Shvedova	6^{2}	2
(Czech Republic) I Benešová (Czech Republic) B Záhlavová-Strýcová	6^{7}	6	[11]
(Chinese Taipei) S-w Hsieh (Russia) A Kleybanova	7	1	[9]
(Russia) M Kirilenko (Russia) N Petrova	3	2
2	(Czech Republic) K Peschke (Slovenia) K Srebotnik	6	6

Quarterfinals
1	(Argentina) G Dulko (Italy) F Pennetta	7	1	[8]
(Israel) S Pe'er (China) S Peng	5	6	[10]
3	(Chinese Taipei) Y-j Chan (United States) L Huber	w/o
WC	(Belarus) V Azarenka (Russia) D Safina
(United States) L Raymond (Australia) R Stubbs	w/o
(Italy) T Garbin (Italy) F Schiavone
(Czech Republic) I Benešová (Czech Republic) B Záhlavová-Strýcová	6	6
2	(Czech Republic) K Peschke (Slovenia) K Srebotnik	2	4

Semifinals
(Israel) S Pe'er (China) S Peng	6	5	[10]
3	(Chinese Taipei) Y-j Chan (United States) L Huber	4	7	[5]
(United States) L Raymond (Australia) R Stubbs	6^{3}	2
(Czech Republic) I Benešová (Czech Republic) B Záhlavová-Strýcová	7	6

Final
(Israel) S Pe'er (China) S Peng	4	6	[8]
(Czech Republic) I Benešová (Czech Republic) B Záhlavová-Strýcová	6	4	[10]
