= 2010 Toray Pan Pacific Open – Singles =

Singles
- 2010 Toray Pan Pacific Open

Final
- Champion: (Denmark) Caroline Wozniacki
- Runner-up: (Russia) Elena Dementieva
- Score: 1–6, 6–2, 6–3

Details
- Draw: 56 (8 Q / 3 WC / 1 LL )
- Seeds: 16

Events
| Singles | Doubles |
- Pan Pacific Open

Caroline Wozniacki defeated Elena Dementieva in the final, 1–6, 6–2, 6–3 to win the singles tennis title at the 2010 Pan Pacific Open. It was Dementieva's last WTA Tour singles final before her retirement from the sport later that year.

Maria Sharapova was the defending champion, but lost in the first round to Kimiko Date-Krumm.

== Seeds ==
The top eight seeds receive a bye into the second round.

1. (Denmark) Caroline Wozniacki (champion)
2. (Russia) Vera Zvonareva (quarterfinals)
3. (Serbia) Jelena Janković (third round)
4. (Australia) Samantha Stosur (second round)
5. (Italy) Francesca Schiavone (semifinals)
6. (Poland) Agnieszka Radwańska (quarterfinals, retired due to left foot pain)
7. (Russia) Elena Dementieva (final)
8. (Belarus) Victoria Azarenka (semifinals)
9. (China) ~~Li Na~~ (withdrew due to gastrointestinal illness)
10. (Russia) Svetlana Kuznetsova (second round)
11. (France) Marion Bartoli (third round, retired due to viral illness)
12. (Russia) Maria Sharapova (first round)
13. (Israel) Shahar Pe'er (second round)
14. (France) Aravane Rezaï (second round)
15. (Russia) Nadia Petrova (first round)
16. (Russia) Anastasia Pavlyuchenkova (third round)

== Main draw ==
Key

- Q = Qualifier
- WC = Wild card
- LL = Lucky loser
- Alt = Alternate
- ITF = ITF entry
- PR = Protected ranking
- SR = Special ranking
- SE = Special exempt
- JE = Junior exempt
- JR = Junior Accelerator Programme entrant
- CO = College Accelerator Programme entrant
- NG = Next Gen Accelerator Program entrant
- w/o = Walkover
- r = Retired
- d = Defaulted

=== Finals ===
Quarterfinals
1 | (Denmark) Caroline Wozniacki | 5
6 | (Poland) Agnieszka Radwańska | 0^{r}
Q | (United States) CoCo Vandeweghe | 2 | 1
8 | (Belarus) Victoria Azarenka | 6 | 6
5 | (Italy) Francesca Schiavone | 7 | 4 | 7
(Estonia) Kaia Kanepi | 5 | 6 | 5
7 | (Russia) Elena Dementieva | 7 | 6
2 | (Russia) Vera Zvonareva | 5 | 2

Semifinals
1 | (Denmark) Caroline Wozniacki | 6 | 6^{3} | 6
8 | (Belarus) Victoria Azarenka | 2 | 7^{7} | 4
5 | (Italy) Francesca Schiavone | 4 | 5
7 | (Russia) Elena Dementieva | 6 | 7

Final
1 | (Denmark) Caroline Wozniacki | 1 | 6 | 6
7 | (Russia) Elena Dementieva | 6 | 2 | 3

=== Top half ===
==== Section 1 ====
First round
Q | (Hungary) G Arn | 6 | 6
Q | (United Kingdom) L Robson | 4 | 3
(Ukraine) K Bondarenko | 6 | 6
(Spain) A Medina Garrigues | 2 | 0
(Slovakia) D Cibulková | 5 | 5
16 | (Russia) A Pavlyuchenkova | 7 | 7
10 | (Russia) S Kuznetsova | 3
(Hungary) Á Szávay | 4^{r}
(Argentina) G Dulko | 3 | 1
(Germany) A Petkovic | 6 | 6
(Belarus) O Govortsova | 6 | 7
Q | (Czech Republic) I Benešová | 4 | 5

Second round
1 | (Denmark) C Wozniacki | 6 | 6
Q | (Hungary) G Arn | 1 | 3
(Ukraine) K Bondarenko | 2 | 1
16 | (Russia) A Pavlyuchenkova | 6 | 6
10 | (Russia) S Kuznetsova | 3 | 5
(Germany) A Petkovic | 6 | 7
(Belarus) O Govortsova | 2 | 3
6 | (Poland) A Radwańska | 6 | 6

Third round
1 | (Denmark) C Wozniacki | 6 | 6
16 | (Russia) A Pavlyuchenkova | 1 | 2
(Germany) A Petkovic | 3 | 3
6 | (Poland) A Radwańska | 6 | 6

Quarterfinals
1 | (Denmark) C Wozniacki | 5
6 | (Poland) A Radwańska | 0^{r}

==== Section 2 ====
First round
(Germany) J Görges | 6 | 5 | 6
(Russia) D Safina | 1 | 7 | 2
Q | (United States) C Vandeweghe | 6 | 7
(Czech Republic) K Zakopalová | 4 | 6^{6}
(Slovenia) P Hercog | 2 | 5
14 | (France) A Rezaï | 6 | 7
11 | (France) M Bartoli | 6 | 6
(Belgium) Y Wickmayer | 4 | 4
(Russia) A Kleybanova | 3 | 2
(Serbia) A Ivanovic | 6 | 6
Q | (Chinese Taipei) K-c Chang | 6 | 1 | 3
(Czech Republic) L Šafářová | 2 | 6 | 6

Second round
4 | (Australia) S Stosur | 5 | 3
(Germany) J Görges | 7 | 6
Q | (United States) C Vandeweghe | 6 | 6
14 | (France) A Rezaï | 4 | 4
11 | (France) M Bartoli | 6 | 6
(Serbia) A Ivanovic | 2 | 1
(Czech Republic) L Šafářová | 1 | 3
8 | (Belarus) V Azarenka | 6 | 6

Third round
(Germany) J Görges | 3 | 0
Q | (United States) C Vandeweghe | 6 | 6
11 | (France) M Bartoli | 2 | 0^{r}
8 | (Belarus) V Azarenka | 6 | 0

Quarterfinals
Q | (United States) C Vandeweghe | 2 | 1
8 | (Belarus) V Azarenka | 6 | 6

=== Bottom half ===
==== Section 3 ====
First round
(Romania) A Dulgheru | 6 | 6
Q | (Russia) E Makarova | 3 | 0
(Germany) A Kerber | 3 | 3
(Slovakia) D Hantuchová | 6 | 6
WC | (Japan) K Date-Krumm | 7 | 3 | 6
12 | (Russia) M Sharapova | 5 | 6 | 3
13 | (Israel) S Pe'er | 5 | 7 | 6
(Switzerland) T Bacsinszky | 7 | 5 | 4
(United States) M Oudin | 4 | 4
(Estonia) K Kanepi | 6 | 6
(Czech Republic) P Kvitová | 6^{8} | 2
(Ukraine) A Bondarenko | 7 | 6

Second round
5 | (Italy) F Schiavone | 7 | 6
(Romania) A Dulgheru | 5 | 3
(Slovakia) D Hantuchová | 6 | 0 | 0^{r}
WC | (Japan) K Date-Krumm | 2 | 6 | 4
13 | (Israel) S Pe'er | 3 | 6^{5}
(Estonia) K Kanepi | 6 | 7
(Ukraine) A Bondarenko | 4 | 1
3 | (Serbia) J Janković | 6 | 6

Third round
5 | (Italy) F Schiavone | 6 | 6
WC | (Japan) K Date-Krumm | 3 | 3
(Estonia) K Kanepi | 6 | 6
3 | (Serbia) J Janković | 4 | 4

Quarterfinals
5 | (Italy) F Schiavone | 7 | 4 | 7
(Estonia) K Kanepi | 5 | 6 | 5

==== Section 4 ====
First round
(Kazakhstan) Y Shvedova | 4 | 6 | 6
WC | (Japan) K Nara | 6 | 2 | 1
Q | (United States) C McHale | 3 | 1
(Italy) F Pennetta | 6 | 6
(Russia) M Kirilenko | 6 | 6^{5} | 6
LL | (Spain) MJ Martínez Sánchez | 3 | 7 | 1
15 | (Russia) N Petrova | 5 | 4
Q | (Italy) R Vinci | 7 | 6
WC | (Japan) A Morita | 3 | 5
(Bulgaria) T Pironkova | 6 | 7
(Czech Republic) B Záhlavová-Strýcová | 3 | 2
(Italy) S Errani | 6 | 6

Second round
7 | (Russia) E Dementieva | 6 | 6
(Kazakhstan) Y Shvedova | 0 | 1
(Italy) F Pennetta | 6 | 4 | 6
(Russia) M Kirilenko | 3 | 6 | 3
Q | (Italy) R Vinci | 6 | 6
(Bulgaria) T Pironkova | 4 | 2
(Italy) S Errani | 3 | 3
2 | (Russia) V Zvonareva | 6 | 6

Third round
7 | (Russia) E Dementieva | 6 | 6
(Italy) F Pennetta | 4 | 2
Q | (Italy) R Vinci | 4 | 0
2 | (Russia) V Zvonareva | 6 | 6

Quarterfinals
7 | (Russia) E Dementieva | 7 | 6
2 | (Russia) V Zvonareva | 5 | 2

== Qualifying ==
=== Qualifying seeds ===
1. (Spain) María José Martínez Sánchez (qualifying competition, lucky loser)
2. (Australia) Jarmila Groth (qualifying competition)
3. (Russia) Ekaterina Makarova (qualified)
4. (United Kingdom) Elena Baltacha (qualifying competition)
5. (Czech Republic) Iveta Benešová (qualified)
6. (Latvia) Anastasija Sevastova (first round)
7. (China) Peng Shuai (first round)
8. (Italy) Roberta Vinci (qualified)
9. (Russia) Vera Dushevina (qualifying competition)
10. (Australia) Anastasia Rodionova (qualifying competition)
11. (Chinese Taipei) Chan Yung-jan (first round)
12. (Italy) Tathiana Garbin (first round)
13. (United States) Vania King (qualifying competition, retired due to a viral illness)
14. (Belgium) Kirsten Flipkens (first round)
15. (Chinese Taipei) Chang Kai-chen (qualified)
16. (Serbia) Bojana Jovanovski (first round)

=== Qualifiers ===
1. (Chinese Taipei) Chang Kai-chen
2. (United States) CoCo Vandeweghe
3. (Russia) Ekaterina Makarova
4. (Hungary) Gréta Arn
5. (Czech Republic) Iveta Benešová
6. (United Kingdom) Laura Robson
7. (United States) Christina McHale
8. (Italy) Roberta Vinci

=== Lucky loser ===
1. (Spain) María José Martínez Sánchez

=== Qualifying draw ===
==== First qualifier ====
First round
1 | (Spain) María José Martínez Sánchez | 7 | 6
(Japan) Misaki Doi | 5 | 2
(Colombia) Catalina Castaño | 4 | 0
15 | (Chinese Taipei) Chang Kai-chen | 6 | 6

Qualifying competition
1 | (Spain) María José Martínez Sánchez | 6 | 5 | 3
15 | (Chinese Taipei) Chang Kai-chen | 2 | 7 | 6

==== Second qualifier ====
First round
2 | (Australia) Jarmila Groth | 7^{7} | 7^{7}
(Japan) Junri Namigata | 6^{2} | 6^{5}
(United States) CoCo Vandeweghe | 7 | 6
12 | (Italy) Tathiana Garbin | 5 | 4

Qualifying competition
2 | (Australia) Jarmila Groth | 4 | 6^{2}
(United States) CoCo Vandeweghe | 6 | 7^{7}

==== Third qualifier ====
First round
3 | (Russia) Ekaterina Makarova | 7 | 6
(South Africa) Chanelle Scheepers | 5 | 3
WC | (Poland) Urszula Radwańska | 3 | 4
13 | (United States) Vania King | 6 | 6

Qualifying competition
3 | (Russia) Ekaterina Makarova | 6 | 0
13 | (United States) Vania King | 1 | 0^{r}

==== Fourth qualifier ====
First round
4 | (United Kingdom) Elena Baltacha | 6 | 6
WC | (Japan) Sachie Ishizu | 4 | 2
(Hungary) Gréta Arn | 3 | 6 | 7
11 | (Chinese Taipei) Chan Yung-jan | 6 | 3 | 5

Qualifying competition
4 | (United Kingdom) Elena Baltacha | 0 | 7^{7} | 3
(Hungary) Gréta Arn | 6 | 6^{5} | 6

==== Fifth qualifier ====
First round
5 | (Czech Republic) Iveta Benešová | 6 | 6
(Spain) Nuria Llagostera Vives | 4 | 0
(France) Pauline Parmentier | 6 | 7
16 | (Serbia) Bojana Jovanovski | 2 | 5

Qualifying competition
5 | (Czech Republic) Iveta Benešová | 6 | 6
(France) Pauline Parmentier | 4 | 2

==== Sixth qualifier ====
First round
6 | (Latvia) Anastasija Sevastova | 1 | 6 | 4
WC | (United Kingdom) Laura Robson | 6 | 3 | 6
(Romania) Simona Halep | 6 | 6
14 | (Belgium) Kirsten Flipkens | 4 | 0

Qualifying competition
WC | (United Kingdom) Laura Robson | 2 | 6 | 6
(Romania) Simona Halep | 6 | 2 | 4

==== Seventh qualifier ====
First round
7 | (China) Peng Shuai | 3 | 2
(United States) Christina McHale | 6 | 6
(Japan) Ryōko Fuda | 6 | 6^{5} | 1
10 | (Australia) Anastasia Rodionova | 0 | 7^{7} | 6

Qualifying competition
(United States) Christina McHale | 6 | 4 | 7
10 | (Australia) Anastasia Rodionova | 2 | 6 | 5

==== Eighth qualifier ====
First round
8 | (Italy) Roberta Vinci | 6 | 6
WC | (Japan) Akiko Yonemura | 1 | 0
(Japan) Tomoko Yonemura | 2 | 0
9 | (Russia) Vera Dushevina | 6 | 6

Qualifying competition
8 | (Italy) Roberta Vinci | 4 | 6 | 6
9 | (Russia) Vera Dushevina | 6 | 2 | 3
