= 2009 WTA Tour Championships – Doubles =

Doubles
- 2009 WTA Tour Championships

Final
- Champions: (Spain) Nuria Llagostera Vives (Spain) María José Martínez Sánchez
- Runners-up: (Zimbabwe) Cara Black (United States) Liezel Huber
- Score: 7–6^{(7–0)}, 5–7, [10–7]

Details
- Draw: 4
- Seeds: 4

Events
Singles	Doubles
← 2008 ·	WTA Tour Championships	· 2010 →

Nuria Llagostera Vives and María José Martínez Sánchez defeated the two-time defending champions Cara Black and Liezel Huber in the final, 7–6^{(7–0)}, 5–7, [10–7] to win the doubles tennis title at the 2009 WTA Tour Championships.

== Seeds ==
1. (Zimbabwe) Cara Black / (United States) Liezel Huber (finals)
2. (United States) Serena Williams / (United States) Venus Williams (semifinals)
3. (Spain) Nuria Llagostera Vives / (Spain) María José Martínez Sánchez (champions)
4. (Australia) Samantha Stosur / (Australia) Rennae Stubbs (semifinals)

== Draw ==
=== Key ===
- Q = Qualifier
- WC = Wild card
- LL = Lucky loser
- Alt = Alternate
- SE = Special exempt
- PR = Protected ranking
- ITF = ITF entry
- JE = Junior exempt
- w/o = Walkover
- r = Retired
- d = Defaulted
- SR = Special ranking

=== Finals ===
Semifinals
1	(Zimbabwe) Cara Black (United States) Liezel Huber	3	7	[10]
4	(Australia) Samantha Stosur (Australia) Rennae Stubbs	6	6^{3}	[8]
3	(Spain) Nuria Llagostera Vives (Spain) María José Martínez Sánchez	2	6	[10]
2	(United States) Serena Williams (United States) Venus Williams	6	4	[8]

Final
1	(Zimbabwe) Cara Black (United States) Liezel Huber	6^{0}	7	[7]
3	(Spain) Nuria Llagostera Vives (Spain) María José Martínez Sánchez	7	5	[10]
