= Nuria Llagostera Vives =

Spanish tennis player (born 1980)

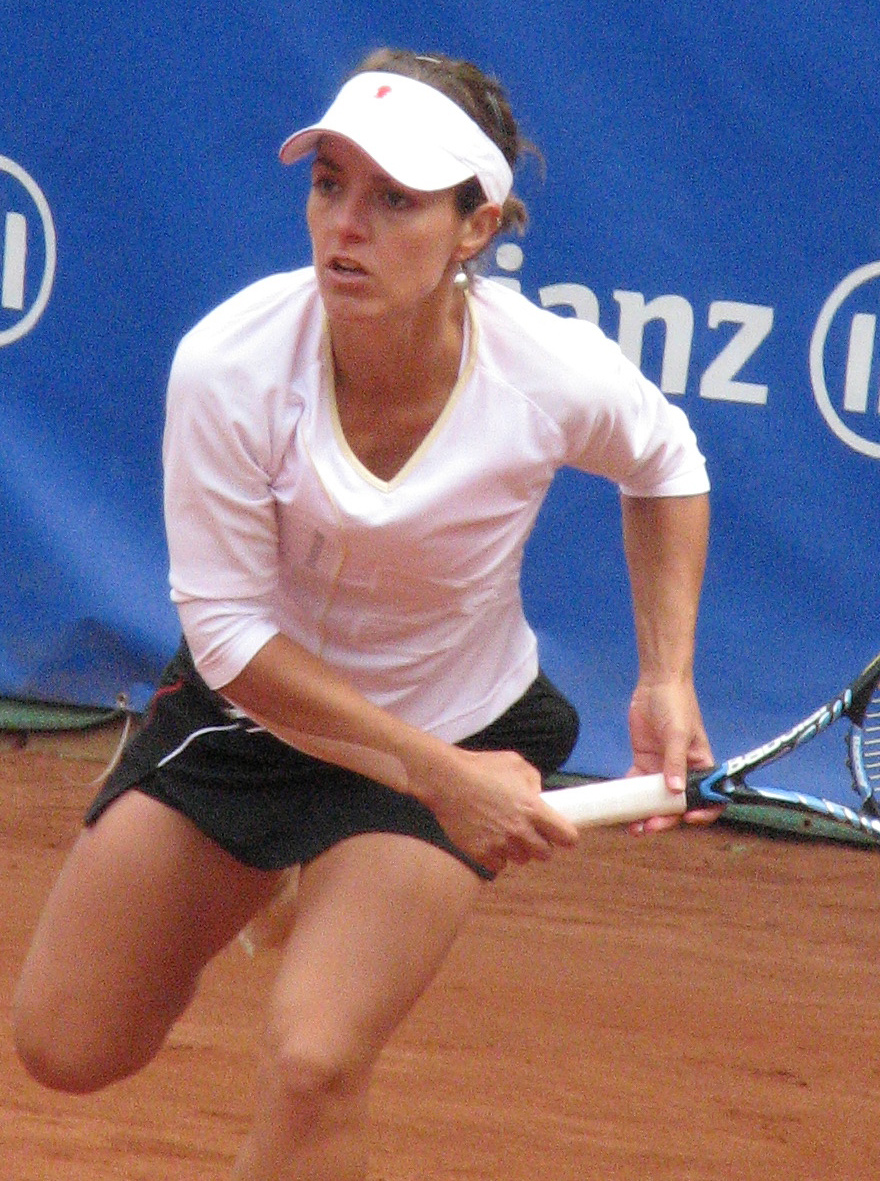
- Llagostera at the 2008 Allianz Cup
- Country (sports): Spain
- Residence: Barcelona, Spain
- Born: 16 May 1980 (age 46) Palma de Mallorca, Spain
- Height: 1.55 m (5 ft 1 in)
- Turned pro: 1996
- Retired: 2013
- Plays: Right-handed (two-handed backhand)
- Prize money: US$2,636,375

Singles
- Career record: 364–282
- Career titles: 2
- Highest ranking: No. 35 (6 June 2005)

Grand Slam singles results
- Australian Open: 3R (2001)
- French Open: 4R (2005)
- Wimbledon: 2R (2004)
- US Open: 1R (2001, 2004, 2005, 2008, 2009, 2010, 2011)

Doubles
- Career record: 298–200
- Career titles: 16
- Highest ranking: No. 5 (2 November 2009)

Grand Slam doubles results
- Australian Open: QF (2009, 2013)
- French Open: SF (2010, 2012)
- Wimbledon: QF (2008, 2009, 2011, 2012)
- US Open: SF (2012)

Other doubles tournaments
- Tour Finals: W (2009)
- Olympic Games: 2R (2012)

Grand Slam mixed doubles results
- Australian Open: QF (2013)
- US Open: QF (2012)

Team competitions
- Fed Cup: 13–10

Nuria Llagostera Vives (Spanish pronunciation: [ˈnuɾja ʎaɣosˈteɾa ˈβiβes]; (Note: In isolation, Vives is pronounced [ˈbiβes].) born 16 May 1980) is a Spanish former tennis player. In June 2005, she reached her best singles ranking of world No. 35. In November 2009, she peaked at No. 5 in the WTA doubles rankings.

== Professional career ==
Llagostera was born in Palma, Majorca on the Balearic Islands. Overall, she won two singles and 16 doubles titles on the WTA Tour. She also won the silver medal at the 2005 Mediterranean Games, losing the final to compatriot Laura Pous Tió.

She was the doubles champion at the 2009 WTA Tour Championships, partnering María José Martínez Sánchez. They defeated Serena and Venus Williams en route to a three-set victory over top seeds Cara Black and Liezel Huber.

In November 2013, Llagostera was handed a 24-month competition ban for an anti-doping rule violation after testing positive for d-methamphetamine at the Bank of the West Classic in Stanford. Shortly after the ruling, she announced her retirement from professional tennis.

== WTA Tour finals ==
=== Singles: 3 (2 titles, 1 runner-up) ===
Legend Grand Slam tournaments Premier M & Premier 5 Premier International (2–1)	Finals by surface Hard (0–1) Clay (2–0) Grass (0–0) Carpet (0–0)

Result	Date	Tournament	Surface	Opponent	Score
Win	May 2005	Marrakech Grand Prix, Morocco	Clay	(China) Zheng Jie	6–4, 6–2
Loss	Sep 2005	Guangzhou Open, China	Hard	(China) Yan Zi	6–4, 4–0 ret.
Win	Feb 2008	Copa Colsanitas, Colombia	Clay	(Argentina) María Emilia Salerni	6–0, 6–4

=== Doubles: 27 (16 titles, 11 runner-ups) ===
Legend Tour Championships (1–0) Premier M & Premier 5 (2–4) Premier (4–0) International (9–7)	Finals by surface Hard (5–4) Clay (10–6) Grass (1–1) Carpet (0–0)

Result	No.	Date	Tournament	Surface	Partner	Opponents	Score
Win	1.	Aug 2004	Warsaw Open, Poland	Clay	(Spain) Marta Marrero	(Poland) Klaudia Jans (Poland) Alicja Rosolska	6–4, 6–3
Loss	1.	Oct 2004	Gaz de France Stars, Belgium	Hard (i)	(Spain) Marta Marrero	(Italy) Mara Santangelo (United States) Jennifer Russell	6–3, 7–5
Loss	2.	May 2005	Marrakech Grand Prix, Morocco	Clay	(Spain) Lourdes Domínguez Lino	(France) Émilie Loit (Czech Republic) Barbora Záhlavová-Strýcová	3–6, 7–6^{(8–6)}, 7–5
Loss	3.	Jun 2005	Rosmalen Championships, Netherlands	Grass	(Czech Republic) Iveta Benešová	(Spain) Anabel Medina Garrigues (Russia) Dinara Safina	6–4, 2–6, 7–6^{(13–11)}
Win	2.	Sep 2005	China Open	Clay	(Venezuela) María Vento-Kabchi	(China) Yan Zi (China) Zheng Jie	6–2, 6–4
Win	3.	Jun 2007	Barcelona Ladies Open, Spain	Clay	(Spain) Arantxa Parra Santonja	(Spain) Lourdes Domínguez Lino (Italy) Flavia Pennetta	7–6^{(7–3)}, 2–6, [12–10]
Win	4.	Mar 2008	Mexican Open	Clay	(Spain) María José Martínez Sánchez	(Czech Republic) Iveta Benešová (Czech Republic) Petra Cetkovská	6–2, 6–4
Loss	4.	May 2008	German Open	Clay	(Spain) María José Martínez Sánchez	(Zimbabwe) Cara Black (South Africa) Liezel Huber	3–6, 6–2, [10–2]
Loss	5.	Jun 2008	Barcelona Open, Spain	Clay	(Spain) María José Martínez Sánchez	(Spain) Arantxa Parra Santonja (Spain) Lourdes Domínguez Lino	4–6, 7–5, [10–4]
Win	5.	Jul 2008	Palermo Ladies Open, Italy	Clay	(Italy) Sara Errani	(Russia) Alla Kudryavtseva (Russia) Anastasia Pavlyuchenkova	2–6, 7–6^{(7–1)}, [10–4]
Loss	6.	Jan 2009	Auckland Open, New Zealand	Hard	(Spain) Arantxa Parra Santonja	(France) Nathalie Dechy (Italy) Mara Santangelo	4–6, 7–6, [12–10]
Win	6.	Feb 2009	Copa Colsanitas, Colombia	Clay	(Spain) María José Martínez Sánchez	(Argentina) Gisela Dulko (Italy) Flavia Pennetta	7–5, 3–6, [10–7]
Win	7.	Feb 2009	Mexican Open	Clay	(Spain) María José Martínez Sánchez	(Spain) Lourdes Domínguez Lino (Spain) Arantxa Parra Santonja	6–4, 6–2
Win	8.	Apr 2009	Barcelona Open, Spain	Clay	(Spain) María José Martínez Sánchez	(Romania) Sorana Cîrstea (Slovenia) Andreja Klepač	3–6, 6–2, [10–8]
Loss	7.	Jul 2009	Swedish Open	Clay	(Spain) María José Martínez Sánchez	(Italy) Flavia Pennetta (Argentina) Gisela Dulko	6–2, 0–6, [10–5]
Win	9.	Jul 2009	Palermo Ladies Open, Italy	Clay	(Spain) María José Martínez Sánchez	(Ukraine) Mariya Koryttseva (Belarus) Darya Kustova	6–1, 6–2
Loss	8.	Aug 2009	Cincinnati Open, United States	Hard	(Spain) María José Martínez Sánchez	(Zimbabwe) Cara Black (United States) Liezel Huber	6–3, 0–6, [10–2]
Win	10.	Aug 2009	Canadian Open	Hard	(Spain) María José Martínez Sánchez	(Australia) Samantha Stosur (Australia) Rennae Stubbs	2–6, 7–5, [11–9]
Win	11.	Aug 2009	Connecticut Open, United States	Hard	(Spain) María José Martínez Sánchez	(Czech Republic) Iveta Benešová (Czech Republic) Lucie Hradecká	6–2, 7–5
Win	12.	Nov 2009	WTA Finals, Doha	Hard	(Spain) María José Martínez Sánchez	(Zimbabwe) Cara Black (United States) Liezel Huber	7–6^{(7–0)}, 5–7, [10–7]
Win	13.	Feb 2010	Dubai Championships, UAE	Hard	(Spain) María José Martínez Sánchez	(Czech Republic) Květa Peschke (Slovenia) Katarina Srebotnik	7–6^{(7–5)}, 6–4
Loss	9.	May 2010	Italian Open	Clay	(Spain) María José Martínez Sánchez	(Italy) Flavia Pennetta (Argentina) Gisela Dulko	6–4, 6–2
Win	14.	Apr 2011	Marbella Experience, Spain	Clay	(Spain) Arantxa Parra Santonja	(Italy) Roberta Vinci (Italy) Sara Errani	3–6, 6–4, [10–5]
Loss	10.	Jul 2011	Swedish Open	Clay	(Spain) Arantxa Parra Santonja	(Spain) Lourdes Domínguez Lino (Spain) María José Martínez Sánchez	6–3, 6–3
Win	15.	Jan 2012	Brisbane International, Australia	Hard	(Spain) Arantxa Parra Santonja	(United States) Raquel Kops-Jones (United States) Abigail Spears	7–6^{(7–2)}, 7–6^{(7–2)}
Win	16.	Jun 2012	Eastbourne International, UK	Grass	(Spain) María José Martínez Sánchez	(United States) Liezel Huber (United States) Lisa Raymond	6–4, ret.
Loss	11.	Oct 2012	China Open	Hard	(India) Sania Mirza	(Russia) Ekaterina Makarova (Russia) Elena Vesnina	5–7, 5–7

== ITF Circuit finals ==
$100,000 tournaments
$75,000 tournaments
$50,000 tournaments
$25,000 tournaments
$10,000 tournaments

=== Singles: 13 (11–2) ===
Outcome	No.	Date	Location	Surface	Opponent	Score
Winner	1.	24 May 1999	Ceuta, Spain	Clay	(Spain) María José Martínez Sánchez	6–3, 6–4
Winner	2.	5 July 1999	Vigo, Spain	Clay	(Spain) Paula García	7–5, 6–4
Winner	3.	10 October 1999	ITF Girona, Spain	Clay	(Spain) Laura Pena	6–2, 6–3
Winner	4.	18 July 1999	Orbetello, Italy	Clay	(Spain) Lourdes Domínguez Lino	6–4, 6–2
Runner-up	1.	30 June 2003	Stuttgart-Vaihingen, Germany	Clay	(Bosnia and Herzegovina) Mervana Jugić-Salkić	3–6, 0–6
Winner	5.	7 June 2004	Grado, Italy	Clay	(Spain) Paula García	5–7, 6–2, 6–1
Winner	6.	18 July 2004	Vittel, France	Clay	(Bulgaria) Lubomira Bacheva	6–2, 6–4
Runner-up	2.	17 August 2004	The Bronx, United States	Hard	(Israel) Evgenia Linetskaya	6–4, 3–6, 4–6
Winner	7.	26 September 2004	Jounieh, Lebanon	Clay	(Spain) Lourdes Domínguez Lino	2–6, 6–0, 6–4
Winner	8.	30 June 2007	Getxo, Spain	Hard	(Argentina) María Emilia Salerni	6–3, 6–3
Winner	9.	3 July 2007	Valladolid, Spain	Hard	(Czech Republic) Petra Cetkovská	7–6^{(3)}, 1–6, 6–3
Winner	10.	22 October 2007	Sant Cugat, Spain	Clay	(Hungary) Kira Nagy	6–2, 6–4
Winner	11.	21 September 2008	Sofia, Bulgaria	Clay	(Bulgaria) Tsvetana Pironkova	6–2, 6–3

=== Doubles: 10 (5–5) ===
Outcome	No.	Date	Tournament	Surface	Partner	Opponents	Score
Runner-up	1.	11 February 1996	ITF Mallorca, Spain	Clay	(Spain) Laura Pena	(Germany) Julia Abe (Germany) Anke Roos	4–6, 2–6
Runner-up	2.	24 May 1999	ITF Ceuta, Spain	Clay	(Ukraine) Oleksandra Kravets	(Spain) Rocío González (Spain) María José Martínez Sánchez	6–7^{(4)}, 0–6
Winner	1.	23 October 2000	ITF Saint-Raphaël, France	Hard (i)	(Spain) Ainhoa Goñi	(France) Kildine Chevalier (Netherlands) Susanne Trik	4–1, 5–4^{(5)}, 3–1 ret.
Runner-up	3.	7 October 2001	ITF Girona, Spain	Clay	(Italy) Maria Elena Camerin	(Spain) Eva Bes (Spain) Lourdes Domínguez Lino	2–6, 6–4, 1–6
Runner-up	4.	3 May 2003	ITF Maglie, Italy	Clay	(Spain) María José Martínez Sánchez	(Romania) Delia Sescioreanu (Romania) Edina Gallovits-Hall	4–6, 6–4, 3–6
Winner	2.	6 October 2003	ITF Juárez, Mexico	Clay	(Spain) Lourdes Domínguez Lino	(Czech Republic) Jana Hlaváčková (Czech Republic) Hana Šromová	4–6, 6–2, 6–3
Runner-up	5.	26 September 2004	ITF Jounieh, Lebanon	Clay	(Portugal) Frederica Piedade	(Czech Republic) Petra Cetkovská (Czech Republic) Hana Šromová	4–6, 2–6
Winner	3.	30 June 2007	ITF Getxo, Spain	Clay	(Spain) Laura Pous Tió	(Spain) Conchita Martínez Granados (Argentina) María Emilia Salerni	6–2, 6–1
Winner	4.	6 July 2007	ITF Valladolid, Spain	Hard	(Spain) Arantxa Parra Santonja	(Germany) Ria Dörnemann (Germany) Justine Ozga	6–0, 6–2
Winner	5.	22 October 2007	ITF Sant Cugat, Spain	Clay	(Spain) María José Martínez Sánchez	(Hungary) Kira Nagy (France) Aurélie Védy	6–4, 6–1

== Performance timelines ==
Key
W	F	SF	QF	#R	RR	Q#	DNQ	A	NH

(W) winner; (F) finalist; (SF) semifinalist; (QF) quarterfinalist; (#R) rounds 4, 3, 2, 1; (RR) round-robin stage; (Q#) qualification round; (DNQ) did not qualify; (A) absent; (NH) not held; (SR) strike rate (events won / competed); (W–L) win–loss record.

=== Singles ===
Tournament	2000	2001	2002	2003	2004	2005	2006	2007	2008	2009	2010	2011	2012	2013	W–L
Grand Slam tournaments
Australian Open	LQ	3R	2R	1R	LQ	1R	1R	A	LQ	1R	LQ	LQ	A	A	3–6
French Open	LQ	3R	1R	A	LQ	4R	A	2R	1R	1R	1R	3R	A	A	8–8
Wimbledon	A	1R	A	A	2R	1R	A	A	1R	1R	1R	LQ	A	A	1–6
US Open	LQ	1R	LQ	LQ	1R	1R	A	LQ	1R	1R	1R	1R	A	A	0–7
Overall win–loss	0–0	4–4	1–2	0–1	1–2	3–4	0–1	1–1	0–3	0–4	0–3	2–2	0–0	0–0	12–27

=== Doubles ===
Tournament	2001	2002	2003	2004	2005	2006	2007	2008	2009	2010	2011	2012	2013	SR	W–L
Grand Slam tournaments
Australian Open	A	A	A	A	1R	1R	A	A	QF	3R	2R	2R	QF	0 / 7	10–7
French Open	A	A	A	A	3R	A	3R	QF	1R	SF	2R	SF	A	0 / 7	16–7
Wimbledon	A	A	A	A	2R	A	A	QF	QF	A	QF	QF	A	0 / 5	12–5
US Open	A	A	A	1R	3R	A	A	2R	QF	1R	2R	SF	3R	0 / 8	11–8
Overall win–loss	0–0	0–0	0–0	0–1	3–4	0–1	2–1	7–3	8–4	6–3	6–4	12–4	5–2	0 / 27	49–27
Year-end championships
Tour Championships	A	A	A	A	A	A	A	A	W	A	A	A	A	1 / 1	2–0
Olympic Games
Summer Olympics	Not Held			A	Not Held			1R	Not Held			2R	NH	0 / 2	1–2
Premier Mandatory tournaments
Indian Wells	A	A	A	A	A	A	A	A	SF	QF	1R	2R	QF	0 / 5	8–5
Miami	A	A	A	A	A	A	1R	A	QF	2R	QF	2R	A	0 / 5	6–5
Madrid	Not Held								QF	SF	2R	SF	A	0 / 4	7–4
Beijing	Tier IV		Tier II						QF	QF	1R	F	A	0 / 4	7–4
Premier 5 tournaments
Dubai	Tier II								A	W	1R	Premier		1 / 2	4–1
Doha	Tier III			Tier II				A	Not Held		P	SF	QF	0 / 2	3–2
Rome	A	A	A	A	A	A	A	A	SF	F	1R	1R	A	0 / 4	4–4
Montréal / Toronto	A	A	A	A	2R	A	1R	A	W	1R	SF	1R	2R	1 / 7	10–6
Cincinnati	Not Held			Tier III					F	1R	1R	SF	QF	0 / 5	9–5
Tokyo	A	A	A	A	A	A	A	A	1R	1R	A	1R	A	0 / 3	0–3
Career statistics
Year	2001	2002	2003	2004	2005	2006	2007	2008	2009	2010	2011	2012	2013	W–L	
WTA Levels & GS
Tournaments played	3	4	1	4	16	4	9	15	22	14	18	22	12		
Titles	0	0	0	1	1	0	1	2	7	1	1	2	0	16	
Finals	0	0	0	2	3	0	1	4	10	2	2	3	0	27	
Overall win–loss	0–3	3–4	1–1	8–2	16–15	2–4	9–8	23–13	55–14	22–13	24–15	39–20	17–12	219–124	
Year-end ranking
Year	2001	2002	2003	2004	2005	2006	2007	2008	2009	2010	2011	2012	2013	Career best	
Ranking	235	219	179	108	55	370	97	29	5	19	32	10	40		

=== ITF levels ===
Doubles
Year	1996	1997	1998	1999	2000	2001	2002	2003	2004	2005	2006	2007	2008	Overall
Played	3	5	5	11	13	5	7	11	13	2	0	6	1	82
Titles	0	0	0	0	1	0	0	1	0	0	0	3	0	5
Finals	1	0	0	1	1	1	0	2	1	0	0	3	0	10
Win	4–3	2–5	3–5	7–11	10–12	7–4	3–6	14–8	8–13	2–2	0–0	13–3	0–1	73–73
