= 2009 Toray Pan Pacific Open =

- Date: September 27 – October 2
- Edition: 26th
- Category: Premier 5
- Surface: Hard / outdoor
- Location: Tokyo, Japan
- Venue: Ariake Coliseum

Champions

Singles
- (Russia) Maria Sharapova

Doubles
- (Russia) Alisa Kleybanova / (Italy) Francesca Schiavone
← 2008 ·	Pan Pacific Open	· 2010 →

The 2009 Toray Pan Pacific Open was a women's tennis tournament played on outdoor hard courts. It was the 26th edition of the Toray Pan Pacific Open, and was part of the Premier Series of the 2009 WTA Tour. It was held at the Ariake Coliseum in Tokyo, Japan, from September 27 through October 2, 2009. Unseeded Maria Sharapova won the singles title.

== Finals ==
=== Singles ===
(Russia) Maria Sharapova defeated (Serbia) Jelena Janković, 5–2 (ret)

- This is Sharapova's first title of the year and 20th of her career. It is her first title since April 2008 in the 2008 Bausch & Lomb Championships and her second win at this event, also winning in 2005.

=== Doubles ===
(Russia) Alisa Kleybanova / (Italy) Francesca Schiavone defeated (Slovakia) Daniela Hantuchová / (Japan) Ai Sugiyama, 6–4, 6–2

== WTA entrants ==
=== Seeds ===
Country	Player	Rank^{1}	Seed
RUS	Dinara Safina	1	1
USA	Venus Williams	3	2
RUS	Elena Dementieva	4	3
DEN	Caroline Wozniacki	5	4
RUS	Svetlana Kuznetsova	6	5
RUS	Vera Zvonareva	7	6
SRB	Jelena Janković	8	7
BLR	Victoria Azarenka	9	8
ITA	Flavia Pennetta	10	9
SRB	Ana Ivanovic	11	10
POL	Agnieszka Radwańska	12	11
AUS	Samantha Stosur	13	12
RUS	Nadia Petrova	14	13
FRA	Marion Bartoli	15	14
CHN	Li Na	16	15
FRA	Virginie Razzano	18	16

- seeds are based on the rankings of September 21, 2009

=== Other entrants ===
The following players received wildcards into the singles main draw:

- (Russia) Dinara Safina
- (Japan) Ai Sugiyama
- (Japan) Ayumi Morita
- (Japan) Kimiko Date-Krumm

The following players received entry from the qualifying draw:

- (Ukraine) Kateryna Bondarenko
- (Russia) Anastasia Pavlyuchenkova
- (United States) Jill Craybas
- (United States) Alexa Glatch
- (Germany) Andrea Petkovic
- (Poland) Urszula Radwańska
- (India) Sania Mirza
- (Chinese Taipei) Chang Kai-Chen
