= 2009 WTA Tour =

Women's tennis circuit

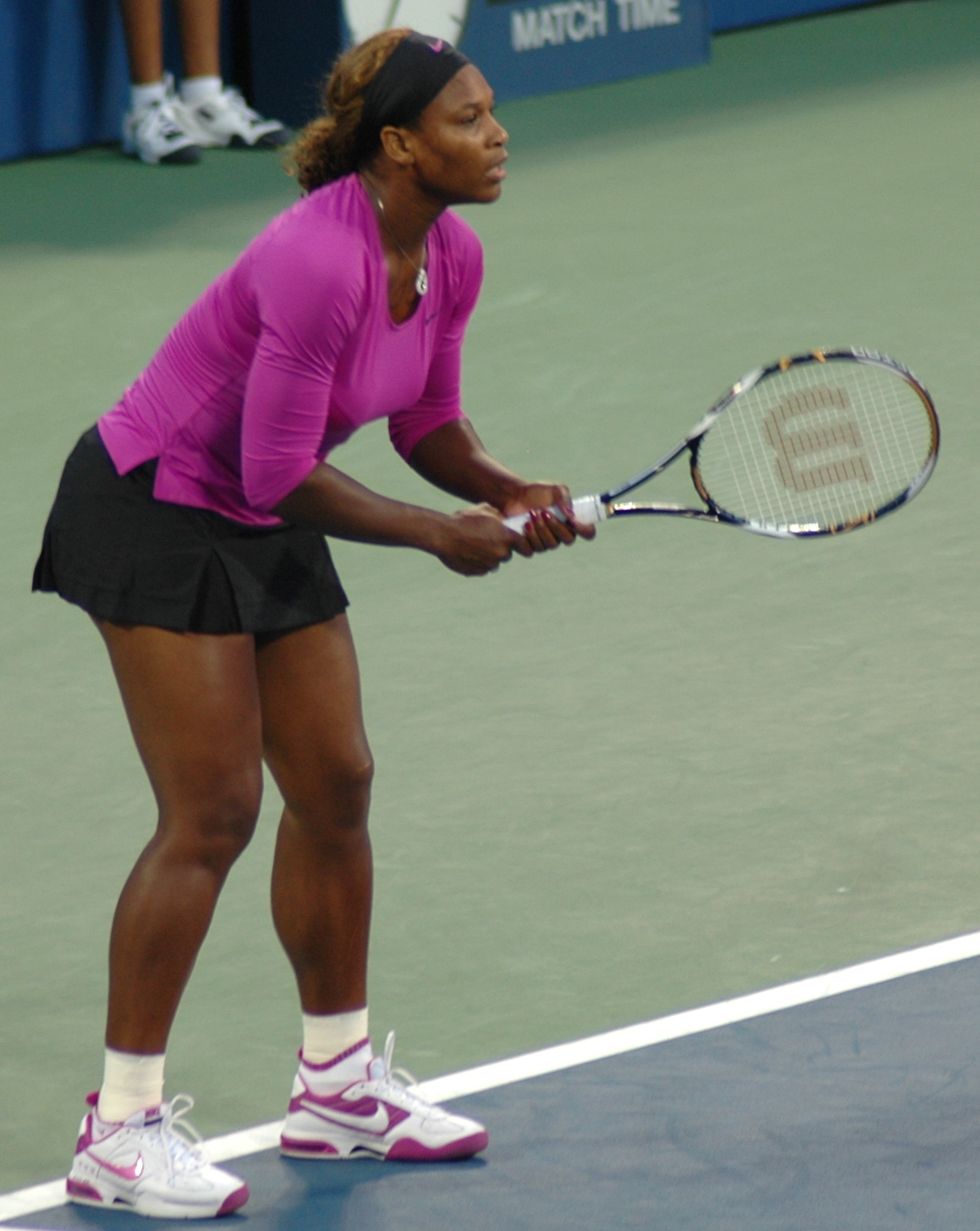
- Serena Williams finished the year as world No. 1 for the second time in her career. She won three tournaments during the season, including two majors at the Australian Open and the Wimbledon Championships, as well as the WTA Tour Championships.

Details
- Duration: January 3 – November 2, 2009
- Edition: 39th
- Tournaments: 55
- Categories: Grand Slam (4); WTA Championships (2); WTA Premier Mandatory (4); WTA Premier 5 (5); WTA Premier (10); WTA International (30)

Achievements (singles)
- Most titles: (Belarus) Victoria Azarenka (Russia) Elena Dementieva (Russia) Svetlana Kuznetsova (Russia) Dinara Safina (United States) Serena Williams (Denmark) Caroline Wozniacki (3)
- Most finals: (Russia) Dinara Safina (Denmark) Caroline Wozniacki (8)
- Prize money leader: (United States) Serena Williams (US$6,545,586)
- Points leader: (United States) Serena Williams (9,075)

Awards
- Player of the year: (United States) Serena Williams
- Doubles team of the year: (United States) Serena Williams (United States) Venus Williams
- Most improved player of the year: (Belgium) Yanina Wickmayer
- Newcomer of the year: (United States) Melanie Oudin
- Comeback player of the year: (Belgium) Kim Clijsters

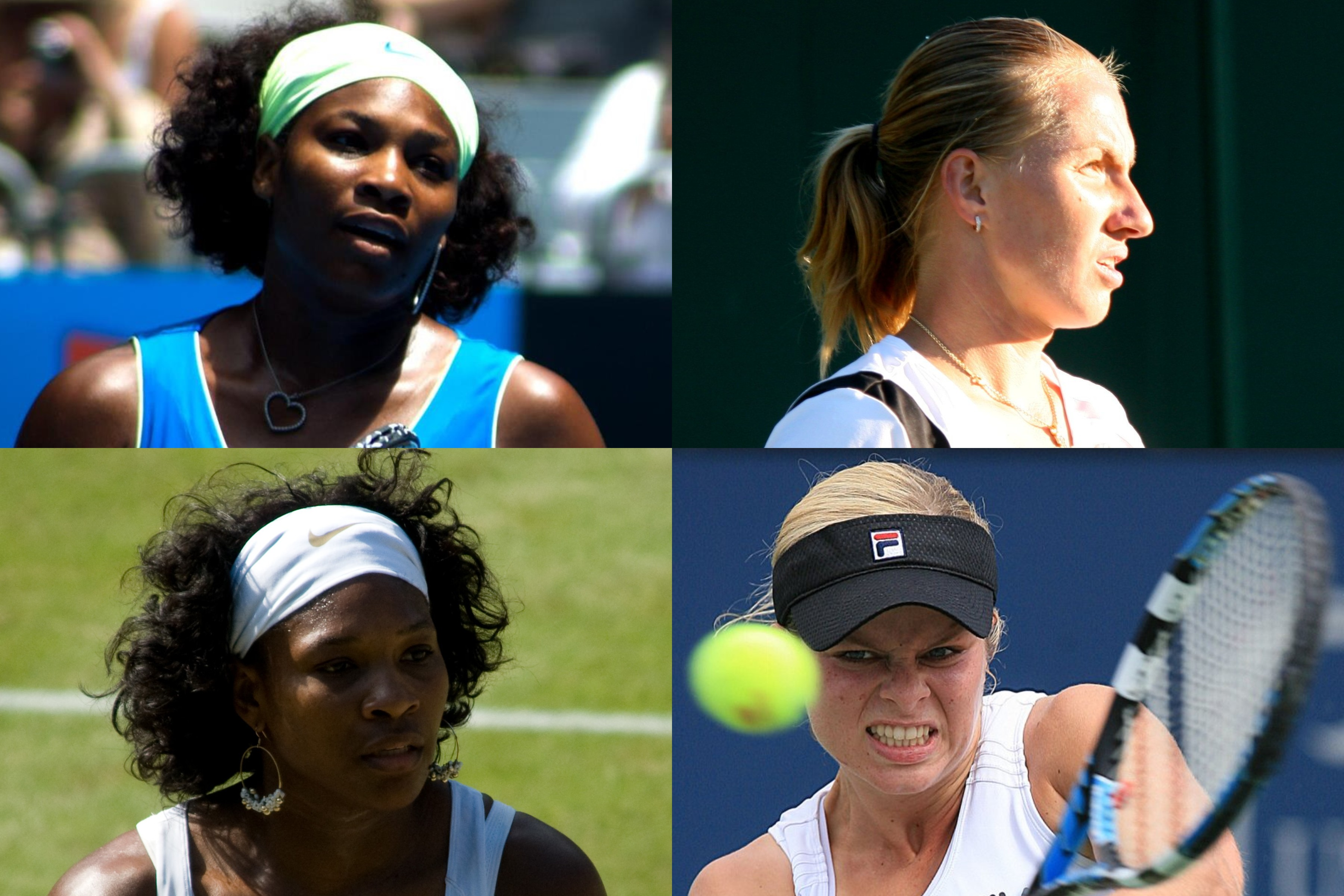
Grand Slam champions of 2009: Australian Open and Wimbledon titlist Serena Williams (top/bottom left), French Open winner Svetlana Kuznetsova (top right), and US Open champion Kim Clijsters.

The 2009 Sony Ericsson WTA Tour was the 37th season since the founding of the Women's Tennis Association. It commenced on January 5, 2009, and concluded on November 8, 2009, after 56 events.

Serena Williams and Dinara Safina engaged in a battle for the year-end No. 1 ranking, with Williams eventually coming out on top after winning the WTA Tour Championships. She won two Grand Slam titles during the year. Safina ascended to No. 1 in April and held it for much of the rest of the season. Svetlana Kuznetsova, Caroline Wozniacki and Elena Dementieva also enjoyed successful years in 2009.

Jelena Janković also battled with inconsistent results, falling from No. 1 in January to No. 8 by November.

Kim Clijsters returned to competitive tennis in August after giving birth to her daughter, and won the US Open title. Maria Sharapova made her comeback in May, having missed all tournaments since the summer of 2008, and rose back into the top 20.

Former world No. 1 Amélie Mauresmo announced her retirement at the end of the season, while Ai Sugiyama and Nathalie Dechy were among other notable players who retired during the year.

== Tour reforms ==
The 2009 season saw the Women's Tennis Association undergo what was described as "its most sweeping reforms in history", with the aim of creating a more fan friendly structure to the Tour, to reduce player withdrawals, and increase player commitment in the biggest tournaments.

The main features of the new "Roadmap" calendar saw the abolition of the previous Tier system, which were replaced by Premier and International tournaments. 20 Premier events were to be held throughout the season, down from the 26 Tier I and Tier II events that were held in 2008. Of those 20, four—the BNP Paribas Open in Indian Wells, the Sony Ericsson Open in Miami, the Mutua Madrileña Madrid Open in Madrid, and the China Open in Beijing—would be mandatory, offering $4.5 million in prize money. Along with that were five other tournaments, the Premier 5s, which offered $2 million in prize money. Ten other Premier tournaments were also held throughout the season. These would all lead up to the Sony Ericsson Championships in Doha, Qatar, which boasted a $4.5 million total prize fund.

In addition, 30 International events were created to replace the previous Tier III and IV categories. The top performers in the Race to the Sony Ericsson Championships who won an International title during the season were to be eligible to compete in the season-ending Commonwealth Bank Tournament of Champions, which was held the week after the Sony Ericsson Championships.

The Roadmap calendar also saw a 30% increase in the length off the off-season, from 7 to 9 weeks, with the season ending in October, as well as more breaks between the bigger tournaments throughout the season, an increase in back-to-back events, a decrease in player commitment, a limitation on top player participation in International tournaments and stronger penalties for top players who miss Premier tournament commitments.

The WTA Tour also moved more closely to a combined Tour with the ATP, with 31% of events being combined men and women events, and equal prize money being offered at ten of the biggest events throughout the season. Total prize money increased to $86 million, which was once again a record high, up from $67 million the previous year.

With the changes came a new ranking system, which now included the player's best-performing 16 events (down from 17), including the four Grand Slam tournaments and the four mandatory events for all players who qualified by ranking, and the awarding of "zero pointers" for top players missing commitments at the biggest events.

Lastly, the Women's Tennis Association also announced that On Court Coaching would be included in all events on the Roadmap calendar. Having been tested in many events since 2006, the decision to approve the move was made to increase the relationship between the viewer and the sport, with viewers being able to listen in on conversations between players and their coaches, who are required to wear a microphone during the exchange. Players were allowed to request their coach once per set, at a changeover or at the end of the set, or when the opposing player was taking a medical timeout or toilet break.

== Season summary ==
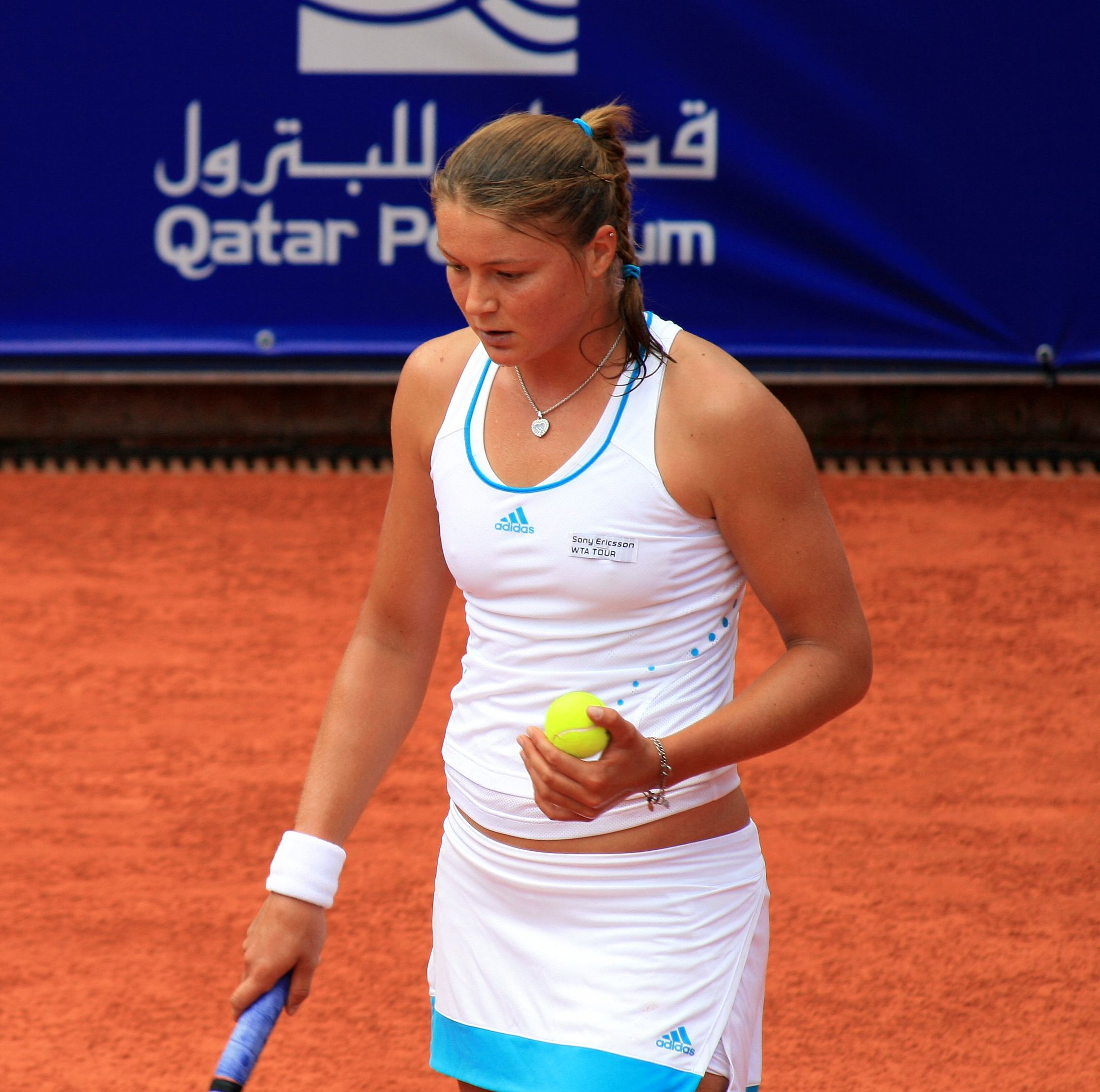
Dinara Safina held No. 1 for 26 weeks from April; and was two times Grand Slam finalist.

=== Singles ===
Elena Dementieva started the season on a hot streak, taking the title in Sydney, beating fellow compatriot Dinara Safina in the final, as well as winning a smaller tournament in Auckland the week before, putting her as a firm contender at the season's opening Grand Slam, the Australian Open.

During the Australian Open fortnight, Venus Williams became the first big casualty when she lost in the second round to Spaniard Carla Suárez Navarro. Jelena Dokić, now a naturalised Australian citizen, made a fairytale run to the quarterfinals, the furthest she'd been in a Grand Slam event since 2002 (represented Yugoslavia at the time), and incumbent world No. 1 Jelena Janković lost in the fourth round to Marion Bartoli. In the quarterfinals, Dokić's run was ended by Safina, with Vera Zvonareva, Dementieva and Serena Williams also moving through. Serena eventually beat Safina in a match that saw the No. 1 ranking on the line, to win her tenth Grand Slam title, and fourth at the Australian Open, and sealing her return to the No. 1 spot.

February saw Amélie Mauresmo overcome her struggling form in the previous two seasons to win the Premier event in Paris. Venus Williams also won the Roadmap's first Premier 5 event in Dubai, beating surprise finalist Virginie Razzano.

At the mandatory Indian Wells, Zvonareva won her biggest career title thus far with a win over Ana Ivanovic in the final. Safina had another chance to reach No. 1 after this tournament, but lost to rising Belarusian Victoria Azarenka. Azarenka won the event in Miami, stopping Serena Williams achieving a record-breaking sixth title there. Janković continued her struggles with her second straight loss, with Safina, Zvonareva and Ivanovic also losing early.

Safina ascended to the No. 1 ranking on April 20 despite not playing the previous week, due to Serena Williams not defending her Charleston title from the previous year. Safina played in her first tournament as the No. 1, but lost in the final of Stuttgart to fellow compatriot Svetlana Kuznetsova, before avenging the loss by beating Kuznetsova in the Rome final. In the final major warm-up event, Safina beat Danish teenager Caroline Wozniacki to win Madrid, which replaced Berlin and changed its surface to clay.

After a strong clay season, Safina was the favourite to win her first Grand Slam at the French Open, and she eventually moved through to the finals in the top half. On the bottom half, Kuznetsova came through, beating Serena Williams in the quarterfinals, to set up the third meeting between the two during the clay season. With Safina heavily favoured, Kuznetsova won the title for her second Grand Slam title in singles, and first since the US Open in 2004. Elsewhere, in a fortnight of surprises, Slovak Dominika Cibulková reached her first Grand Slam semifinal, beating Maria Sharapova in the quarterfinals, who was returning from a lengthy lay-off from shoulder surgery recovery. Australian Samantha Stosur also reached her first Grand Slam semifinal, taking down Dementieva in the second round. Last year's defending champion Ivanovic lost to Azarenka in the fourth round, a loss which dropped her out of the top 10 in the world.

The top four seeds all reached the semifinals at Wimbledon, the first time it had happened since 2006. The first week did, however, recent French Open champion Kuznetsova upset by German Sabine Lisicki on her way to her first Grand Slam quarterfinal, and Janković would lose to American teenager Melanie Oudin. The semifinals were direct contrasts to each other, with Venus Williams thrashing Safina in the top half semifinal, and Serena Williams beating Dementieva in an epic 8–6 in the third encounter. The final was the fourth all-Williams Wimbledon final, and the second in a row. Serena avenged her loss to Venus in last year's final to win her third Wimbledon title, first since 2003, and eleventh Grand Slam title overall.

The US Open Series turned out to be an open race, with five different champions being crowned at the tournaments. Eventually, it went to Toronto champion Dementieva, who also reached the semifinals in Cincinnati and Stanford. Italian Flavia Pennetta finished second after winning Los Angeles and reaching the semifinals in Cincinnati and New Haven, results which saw her break into the top 10. Cincinnati champion Janković came third. Also during the summer hardcourt season, unranked Belgian Kim Clijsters made her return to competitive tennis in Cincinnati after giving birth.

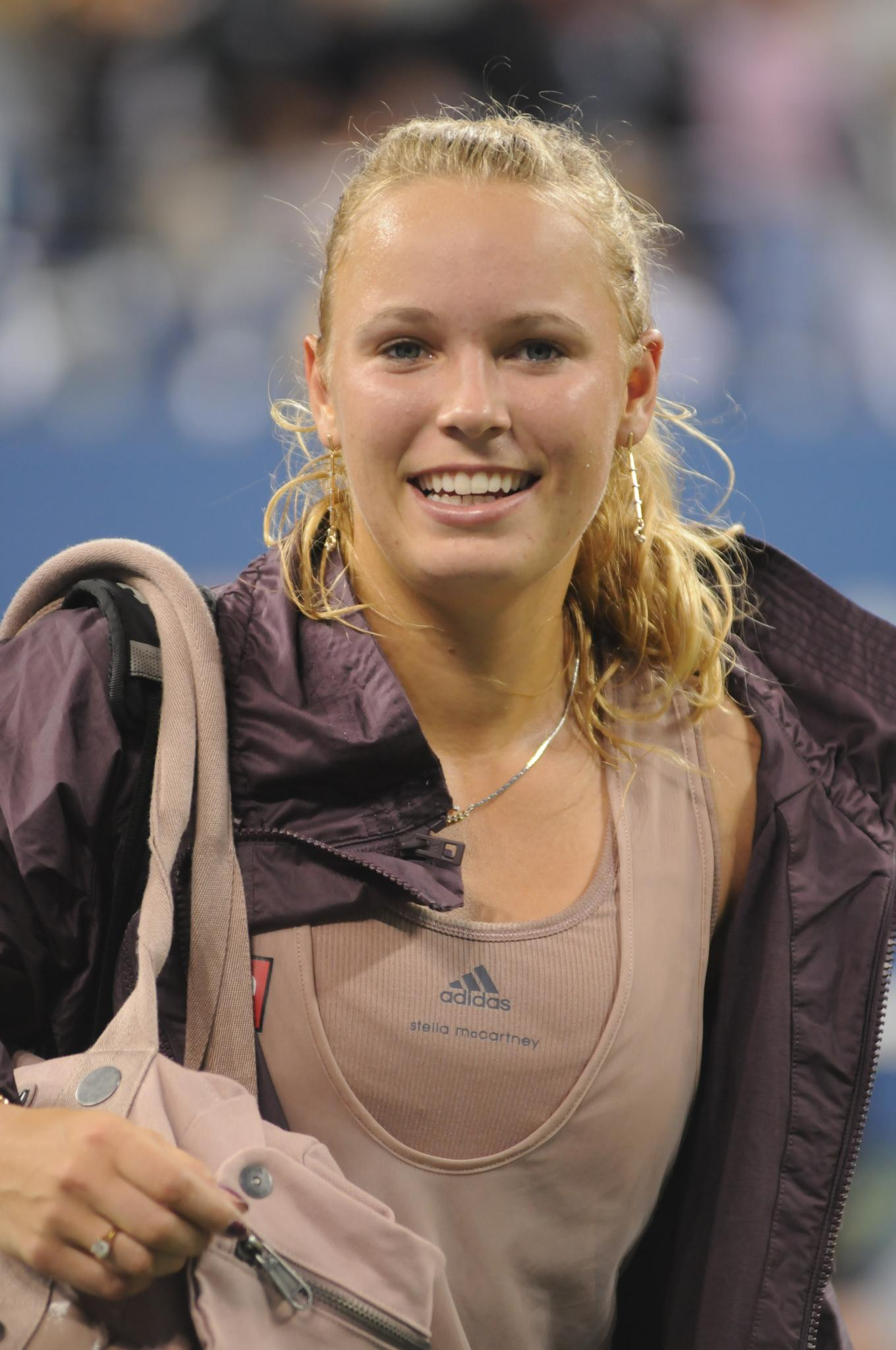
Caroline Wozniacki broke the top 10 during the season, and reached the US Open final.

At the US Open, Wozniacki reached her first Grand Slam final, becoming the first Dane, male or female, to reach a Grand Slam final, after a half of upsets which saw Safina, Janković, and Dementieva all lose in the first week. Oudin reached her first major quarterfinal by defeating Russians Dementieva, Sharapova, and Nadia Petrova back-to-back, while Clijsters's fellow Belgian compatriot Yanina Wickmayer reached her first semifinal at this level. In the bottom half, Clijsters came through after defeating Venus Williams in the fourth round, and later her sister Serena in the semifinals, in a match that ended with Serena receiving a point penalty, and later a fine, for unsportsmanlike conduct after reacting to a foot fault called by the linesperson. In the final, Clijsters beat Wozniacki to win her second Grand Slam title in only her third tournament back, and become the first mother to win a Grand Slam title since Evonne Goolagong Cawley in 1980.

The fall season saw Sharapova win her first title since returning from her shoulder surgery in Tokyo. Kimiko Date-Krumm provided a notable story, becoming the second oldest player to ever win a title in the Open Era in Seoul. Kuznetsova won the event in Beijing, beating rising Polish player Agnieszka Radwańska in the final. Following that tournament, Safina surrendered her No. 1 ranking to Serena Williams, before regaining it the week prior to the WTA Tour Championships. This meant that the year-end No. 1 would be decided in Doha, with whoever performed better in the tournament achieving the position. Safina retired in her first match, while Serena went on to win the title to become the year-end No. 1 for only the second time, after 2002.

== Schedule ==
This is the complete schedule of events on the 2009 Sony Ericsson WTA Tour, with player progression documented from the quarterfinals stage.

Key

Grand Slam events
Year-end championships
WTA Premier Mandatory tournaments
WTA Premier 5 tournaments
WTA Premier tournaments
WTA International tournaments
Team events

=== January ===
Week	Tournament	Champions	Runners-up	Semifinalists	Quarterfinalists
Jan 5	Hopman Cup; Perth, Australia; Hopman Cup; Hard (i) – A$1,000,000 – 8 teams (RR)	Slovakia; 2–0	Russia	Round robin losers (Group A) Germany; United States; Australia	Round robin losers (Group B) Italy; France; Chinese Taipei
Jan 5	Brisbane International; Brisbane, Australia; WTA International; Hard – $220,000 – 32S/32Q/16D; Singles – Doubles	(Belarus) Victoria Azarenka; 6–3, 6–1	(France) Marion Bartoli	(France) Amélie Mauresmo (Italy) Sara Errani	(Serbia) Ana Ivanovic (Italy) Tathiana Garbin (Belarus) Olga Govortsova (Czech Republic) Lucie Šafářová
Jan 5	Brisbane International; Brisbane, Australia; WTA International; Hard – $220,000 – 32S/32Q/16D; Singles – Doubles	(Germany) Anna-Lena Grönefeld (United States) Vania King; 3–6, 7–5, [10–5]	(Poland) Klaudia Jans (Poland) Alicja Rosolska	(France) Amélie Mauresmo (Italy) Sara Errani	(Serbia) Ana Ivanovic (Italy) Tathiana Garbin (Belarus) Olga Govortsova (Czech Republic) Lucie Šafářová
Jan 5	ASB Classic; Auckland, New Zealand; WTA International; Hard – $220,000 – 32S/32Q/16D; Singles – Doubles	(Russia) Elena Dementieva; 6–4, 6–1	(Russia) Elena Vesnina	(France) Aravane Rezaï (United Kingdom) Anne Keothavong	(Israel) Shahar Pe'er (Romania) Edina Gallovits (Japan) Ayumi Morita (Denmark) Caroline Wozniacki
Jan 5	ASB Classic; Auckland, New Zealand; WTA International; Hard – $220,000 – 32S/32Q/16D; Singles – Doubles	(France) Nathalie Dechy (Italy) Mara Santangelo; 4–6, 7–6^{(7–3)}, [12–10]	(Spain) Nuria Llagostera Vives (Spain) Arantxa Parra Santonja	(France) Aravane Rezaï (United Kingdom) Anne Keothavong	(Israel) Shahar Pe'er (Romania) Edina Gallovits (Japan) Ayumi Morita (Denmark) Caroline Wozniacki
Jan 12	Medibank International Sydney; Sydney, Australia; WTA Premier; Hard – $600,000 – 32S/32Q/16D; Singles – Doubles	(Russia) Elena Dementieva; 6–3, 2–6, 6–1	(Russia) Dinara Safina	(United States) Serena Williams (Japan) Ai Sugiyama	(Denmark) Caroline Wozniacki (Poland) Agnieszka Radwańska (Russia) Svetlana Kuznetsova (France) Alizé Cornet
Jan 12	Medibank International Sydney; Sydney, Australia; WTA Premier; Hard – $600,000 – 32S/32Q/16D; Singles – Doubles	(Chinese Taipei) Hsieh Su-wei (China) Peng Shuai; 6–0, 6–1	(France) Nathalie Dechy (Australia) Casey Dellacqua	(United States) Serena Williams (Japan) Ai Sugiyama	(Denmark) Caroline Wozniacki (Poland) Agnieszka Radwańska (Russia) Svetlana Kuznetsova (France) Alizé Cornet
Jan 12	Moorilla Hobart International; Hobart, Australia; WTA International; Hard – $220,000 – 32S/32Q/16D; Singles – Doubles	(Czech Republic) Petra Kvitová; 7–5, 6–1	(Czech Republic) Iveta Benešová	(Slovakia) Magdaléna Rybáriková (France) Virginie Razzano	(Hungary) Melinda Czink (Argentina) Gisela Dulko (Russia) Anastasia Pavlyuchenkova (Bulgaria) Tsvetana Pironkova
Jan 12	Moorilla Hobart International; Hobart, Australia; WTA International; Hard – $220,000 – 32S/32Q/16D; Singles – Doubles	(Argentina) Gisela Dulko (Italy) Flavia Pennetta; 6–2, 7–6^{(7–4)}	(Ukraine) Alona Bondarenko (Ukraine) Kateryna Bondarenko	(Slovakia) Magdaléna Rybáriková (France) Virginie Razzano	(Hungary) Melinda Czink (Argentina) Gisela Dulko (Russia) Anastasia Pavlyuchenkova (Bulgaria) Tsvetana Pironkova
Jan 19; Jan 26	Australian Open; Melbourne, Australia; Grand Slam; Hard – $7,262,973 – 128S/96Q/64D/32X; Singles – Doubles – Mixed doubles	(United States) Serena Williams; 6–0, 6–3	(Russia) Dinara Safina	(Russia) Vera Zvonareva (Russia) Elena Dementieva	(France) Marion Bartoli (Australia) Jelena Dokić (Spain) Carla Suárez Navarro (Russia) Svetlana Kuznetsova
Jan 19; Jan 26	Australian Open; Melbourne, Australia; Grand Slam; Hard – $7,262,973 – 128S/96Q/64D/32X; Singles – Doubles – Mixed doubles	(United States) Serena Williams (United States) Venus Williams; 6–3, 6–3	(Slovakia) Daniela Hantuchová (Japan) Ai Sugiyama	(Russia) Vera Zvonareva (Russia) Elena Dementieva	(France) Marion Bartoli (Australia) Jelena Dokić (Spain) Carla Suárez Navarro (Russia) Svetlana Kuznetsova
Jan 19; Jan 26	Australian Open; Melbourne, Australia; Grand Slam; Hard – $7,262,973 – 128S/96Q/64D/32X; Singles – Doubles – Mixed doubles	(India) Sania Mirza (India) Mahesh Bhupathi; 6–3, 6–1	(France) Nathalie Dechy (Israel) Andy Ram	(Russia) Vera Zvonareva (Russia) Elena Dementieva	(France) Marion Bartoli (Australia) Jelena Dokić (Spain) Carla Suárez Navarro (Russia) Svetlana Kuznetsova

=== February ===
Week	Tournament	Champions	Runners-up	Semifinalists	Quarterfinalists
Feb 2	Fed Cup: First Round; Moscow, Russia, Hard (i); Orléans, France, Hard (i); Surprise, United States, Hard; Brno, Czech Republic, Carpet (i)	First round winners Russia 5–0; Italy 5–0; United States 3–2; Czech Republic 4–1	First round losers China; France; Argentina; Spain		
Feb 9	Open GDF Suez; Paris, France; WTA Premier; Hard (i) – $700,000 – 32S/32Q/16D; Singles – Doubles	(France) Amélie Mauresmo; 7–6(7), 2–6, 6–4	(Russia) Elena Dementieva	(United States) Serena Williams (Serbia) Jelena Janković	(France) Émilie Loit (France) Nathalie Dechy (Poland) Agnieszka Radwańska (France) Alizé Cornet
Feb 9	Open GDF Suez; Paris, France; WTA Premier; Hard (i) – $700,000 – 32S/32Q/16D; Singles – Doubles	(Zimbabwe) Cara Black (United States) Liezel Huber; 6–4, 3–6, [10–4]	(Czech Republic) Květa Peschke (United States) Lisa Raymond	(United States) Serena Williams (Serbia) Jelena Janković	(France) Émilie Loit (France) Nathalie Dechy (Poland) Agnieszka Radwańska (France) Alizé Cornet
Feb 9	PTT Pattaya Open; Pattaya, Thailand; WTA International; Hard – $220,000 – 32S/32Q/16D; Singles – Doubles	(Russia) Vera Zvonareva; 7–5, 6–1	(India) Sania Mirza	(Israel) Shahar Pe'er (Slovakia) Magdaléna Rybáriková	(China) Peng Shuai (Russia) Vera Dushevina (Thailand) Tamarine Tanasugarn (Denmark) Caroline Wozniacki
Feb 9	PTT Pattaya Open; Pattaya, Thailand; WTA International; Hard – $220,000 – 32S/32Q/16D; Singles – Doubles	(Kazakhstan) Yaroslava Shvedova (Thailand) Tamarine Tanasugarn; 6–3, 6–2	(Ukraine) Yuliya Beygelzimer (Russia) Vitalia Diatchenko	(Israel) Shahar Pe'er (Slovakia) Magdaléna Rybáriková	(China) Peng Shuai (Russia) Vera Dushevina (Thailand) Tamarine Tanasugarn (Denmark) Caroline Wozniacki
Feb 16	Barclays Dubai Tennis Championships; Dubai, United Arab Emirates; WTA Premier 5 Hard – $2,000,000 – 56S/32Q/28D; Singles – Doubles	(United States) Venus Williams; 6–4, 6–2	(France) Virginie Razzano	(United States) Serena Williams (Estonia) Kaia Kanepi	(Serbia) Ana Ivanovic (Russia) Elena Dementieva (Russia) Elena Vesnina (Russia) Vera Zvonareva
Feb 16	Barclays Dubai Tennis Championships; Dubai, United Arab Emirates; WTA Premier 5 Hard – $2,000,000 – 56S/32Q/28D; Singles – Doubles	(Zimbabwe) Cara Black (United States) Liezel Huber; 6–3, 6–3	(Russia) Maria Kirilenko (Poland) Agnieszka Radwańska	(United States) Serena Williams (Estonia) Kaia Kanepi	(Serbia) Ana Ivanovic (Russia) Elena Dementieva (Russia) Elena Vesnina (Russia) Vera Zvonareva
Feb 16	Cellular South Cup; Memphis, United States; WTA International; Hard (i) – $220,000 – 32S/32Q/16D; Singles – Doubles	(Belarus) Victoria Azarenka; 6–1, 6–3	(Denmark) Caroline Wozniacki	(United Kingdom) Anne Keothavong (Germany) Sabine Lisicki	(Netherlands) Michaëlla Krajicek (New Zealand) Marina Erakovic (Czech Republic) Lucie Šafářová (France) Pauline Parmentier
Feb 16	Cellular South Cup; Memphis, United States; WTA International; Hard (i) – $220,000 – 32S/32Q/16D; Singles – Doubles	(Belarus) Victoria Azarenka (Denmark) Caroline Wozniacki; 6–1, 7–6^{(7–2)}	(Ukraine) Yuliana Fedak (Netherlands) Michaëlla Krajicek	(United Kingdom) Anne Keothavong (Germany) Sabine Lisicki	(Netherlands) Michaëlla Krajicek (New Zealand) Marina Erakovic (Czech Republic) Lucie Šafářová (France) Pauline Parmentier
Feb 16	Copa Sony Ericsson Colsanitas; Bogotá, Colombia; WTA International; Clay (red) – $220,000 – 32S/32Q/16D; Singles – Doubles	(Spain) María José Martínez Sánchez; 6–3, 6–2	(Argentina) Gisela Dulko	(Romania) Edina Gallovits (Austria) Patricia Mayr	(Slovenia) Maša Zec Peškirič (France) Mathilde Johansson (Romania) Ioana Raluca Olaru (Argentina) Betina Jozami
Feb 16	Copa Sony Ericsson Colsanitas; Bogotá, Colombia; WTA International; Clay (red) – $220,000 – 32S/32Q/16D; Singles – Doubles	(Spain) Nuria Llagostera Vives (Spain) María José Martínez Sánchez; 7–5, 3–6, [10–7]	(Argentina) Gisela Dulko (Italy) Flavia Pennetta	(Romania) Edina Gallovits (Austria) Patricia Mayr	(Slovenia) Maša Zec Peškirič (France) Mathilde Johansson (Romania) Ioana Raluca Olaru (Argentina) Betina Jozami
Feb 23	Abierto Mexicano Telcel; Acapulco, Mexico; WTA International; Clay (red) – $220,000 – 32S/32Q/16D; Singles – Doubles	(United States) Venus Williams; 6–1, 6–2	(Italy) Flavia Pennetta	(Czech Republic) Barbora Záhlavová-Strýcová (Czech Republic) Iveta Benešová	(Hungary) Ágnes Szávay (Estonia) Maret Ani (France) Mathilde Johansson (Czech Republic) Petra Cetkovská
Feb 23	Abierto Mexicano Telcel; Acapulco, Mexico; WTA International; Clay (red) – $220,000 – 32S/32Q/16D; Singles – Doubles	(Spain) Nuria Llagostera Vives (Spain) María José Martínez Sánchez; 6–4, 6–2	(Spain) Lourdes Domínguez Lino (Spain) Arantxa Parra Santonja	(Czech Republic) Barbora Záhlavová-Strýcová (Czech Republic) Iveta Benešová	(Hungary) Ágnes Szávay (Estonia) Maret Ani (France) Mathilde Johansson (Czech Republic) Petra Cetkovská

=== March ===
Week	Tournament	Champions	Runners-up	Semifinalists	Quarterfinalists
Mar 2	Monterrey Open; Monterrey, Mexico; WTA International; Hard – $220,000 – 32S/32Q/16D; Singles – Doubles	(France) Marion Bartoli; 6–4, 6–3	(China) Li Na	(Czech Republic) Iveta Benešová (China) Zheng Jie	(Czech Republic) Lucie Šafářová (Czech Republic) Barbora Záhlavová-Strýcová (Argentina) Gisela Dulko (United States) Vania King
Mar 2	Monterrey Open; Monterrey, Mexico; WTA International; Hard – $220,000 – 32S/32Q/16D; Singles – Doubles	(France) Nathalie Dechy (Italy) Mara Santangelo; 6–3, 6–4	(Czech Republic) Iveta Benešová (Czech Republic) Barbora Záhlavová-Strýcová	(Czech Republic) Iveta Benešová (China) Zheng Jie	(Czech Republic) Lucie Šafářová (Czech Republic) Barbora Záhlavová-Strýcová (Argentina) Gisela Dulko (United States) Vania King
Mar 9 Mar 16	BNP Paribas Open; Indian Wells, United States; WTA Premier Mandatory; Hard – $4,500,000 – 96S/48Q/32D; Singles – Doubles	(Russia) Vera Zvonareva; 7–6^{(7–5)}, 6–2	(Serbia) Ana Ivanovic	(Belarus) Victoria Azarenka (Russia) Anastasia Pavlyuchenkova	(Russia) Dinara Safina (Denmark) Caroline Wozniacki (Austria) Sybille Bammer (Poland) Agnieszka Radwańska
Mar 9 Mar 16	BNP Paribas Open; Indian Wells, United States; WTA Premier Mandatory; Hard – $4,500,000 – 96S/48Q/32D; Singles – Doubles	(Belarus) Victoria Azarenka (Russia) Vera Zvonareva; 6–4, 3–6, [10–5]	(Argentina) Gisela Dulko (Israel) Shahar Pe'er	(Belarus) Victoria Azarenka (Russia) Anastasia Pavlyuchenkova	(Russia) Dinara Safina (Denmark) Caroline Wozniacki (Austria) Sybille Bammer (Poland) Agnieszka Radwańska
Mar 23; Mar 30	Sony Ericsson Open; Key Biscayne, United States; WTA Premier Mandatory; Hard – $4,500,000 – 96S/48Q/32D; Singles – Doubles	(Belarus) Victoria Azarenka; 6–3, 6–1	(United States) Serena Williams	(United States) Venus Williams (Russia) Svetlana Kuznetsova	(China) Li Na (Czech Republic) Iveta Benešová (Denmark) Caroline Wozniacki (Australia) Samantha Stosur
Mar 23; Mar 30	Sony Ericsson Open; Key Biscayne, United States; WTA Premier Mandatory; Hard – $4,500,000 – 96S/48Q/32D; Singles – Doubles	(Russia) Svetlana Kuznetsova (France) Amélie Mauresmo; 4–6, 6–3, [10–3]	(Czech Republic) Květa Peschke (United States) Lisa Raymond	(United States) Venus Williams (Russia) Svetlana Kuznetsova	(China) Li Na (Czech Republic) Iveta Benešová (Denmark) Caroline Wozniacki (Australia) Samantha Stosur

=== April ===
Week	Tournament	Champions	Runners-up	Semifinalists	Quarterfinalists
Apr 6	Andalucia Tennis Experience; Marbella, Spain; WTA International; Clay (red) – $500,000 – 32S/32Q/16D; Singles – Doubles	(Serbia) Jelena Janković; 6–3, 3–6, 6–3	(Spain) Carla Suárez Navarro	(Romania) Sorana Cîrstea (Spain) Anabel Medina Garrigues	(Czech Republic) Klára Zakopalová (Estonia) Kaia Kanepi (Italy) Sara Errani (Italy) Roberta Vinci
Apr 6	Andalucia Tennis Experience; Marbella, Spain; WTA International; Clay (red) – $500,000 – 32S/32Q/16D; Singles – Doubles	(Poland) Klaudia Jans (Poland) Alicja Rosolska; 6–3, 6–3	(Spain) Anabel Medina Garrigues (Spain) Virginia Ruano Pascual	(Romania) Sorana Cîrstea (Spain) Anabel Medina Garrigues	(Czech Republic) Klára Zakopalová (Estonia) Kaia Kanepi (Italy) Sara Errani (Italy) Roberta Vinci
Apr 6	MPS Group Championships; Ponte Vedra Beach, United States; WTA International; Clay – $220,000 (green) – 32S/32Q/16D; Singles – Doubles	(Denmark) Caroline Wozniacki; 6–1, 6–2	(Canada) Aleksandra Wozniak	(Russia) Nadia Petrova (Russia) Elena Vesnina	(Ukraine) Alona Bondarenko (Austria) Tamira Paszek (Slovakia) Dominika Cibulková (Slovakia) Daniela Hantuchová
Apr 6	MPS Group Championships; Ponte Vedra Beach, United States; WTA International; Clay – $220,000 (green) – 32S/32Q/16D; Singles – Doubles	(Chinese Taipei) Chuang Chia-jung (India) Sania Mirza; 6–3, 4–6, [10–7]	(Czech Republic) Květa Peschke (United States) Lisa Raymond	(Russia) Nadia Petrova (Russia) Elena Vesnina	(Ukraine) Alona Bondarenko (Austria) Tamira Paszek (Slovakia) Dominika Cibulková (Slovakia) Daniela Hantuchová
Apr 13	Family Circle Cup; Charleston, United States; WTA Premier; Clay – $1,000,000 (green) – 56S/32Q/16D; Singles – Doubles	(Germany) Sabine Lisicki; 6–2, 6–4	(Denmark) Caroline Wozniacki	(Russia) Elena Dementieva (France) Marion Bartoli	(Slovakia) Dominika Cibulková (France) Virginie Razzano (Hungary) Melinda Czink (Russia) Elena Vesnina
Apr 13	Family Circle Cup; Charleston, United States; WTA Premier; Clay – $1,000,000 (green) – 56S/32Q/16D; Singles – Doubles	(United States) Bethanie Mattek-Sands (Russia) Nadia Petrova; 6–7^{(5–7)}, 6–2, [11–9]	(Latvia) Līga Dekmeijere (Switzerland) Patty Schnyder	(Russia) Elena Dementieva (France) Marion Bartoli	(Slovakia) Dominika Cibulková (France) Virginie Razzano (Hungary) Melinda Czink (Russia) Elena Vesnina
Apr 13	Barcelona Ladies Open; Barcelona, Spain; WTA International; Clay (red) – $220,000 – 32S/32Q/16D; Singles – Doubles	(Italy) Roberta Vinci; 6–0, 6–4	(Russia) Maria Kirilenko	(Spain) Carla Suárez Navarro (Italy) Francesca Schiavone	(Germany) Tatjana Malek (Spain) María José Martínez Sánchez (Czech Republic) Lucie Šafářová (Belarus) Anastasiya Yakimova
Apr 13	Barcelona Ladies Open; Barcelona, Spain; WTA International; Clay (red) – $220,000 – 32S/32Q/16D; Singles – Doubles	(Spain) Nuria Llagostera Vives (Spain) María José Martínez Sánchez; 3–6, 6–2, [10–8]	(Romania) Sorana Cîrstea (Slovenia) Andreja Klepač	(Spain) Carla Suárez Navarro (Italy) Francesca Schiavone	(Germany) Tatjana Malek (Spain) María José Martínez Sánchez (Czech Republic) Lucie Šafářová (Belarus) Anastasiya Yakimova
Apr 20	Fed Cup: Semifinals; Castellaneta, Italy, Clay; Brno, Czech Republic, Hard (i)	Semifinals winners Italy 4–1; United States 3–2	Semifinals losers Russia; Czech Republic		
April 27	Porsche Tennis Grand Prix; Stuttgart, Germany; WTA Premier; Clay (red) (i) – $700,000 – 32S/32Q/16D; Singles – Doubles	(Russia) Svetlana Kuznetsova; 6–4, 6–3	(Russia) Dinara Safina	(Italy) Flavia Pennetta (Russia) Elena Dementieva	(Poland) Agnieszka Radwańska (Serbia) Jelena Janković (Argentina) Gisela Dulko (France) Marion Bartoli
April 27	Porsche Tennis Grand Prix; Stuttgart, Germany; WTA Premier; Clay (red) (i) – $700,000 – 32S/32Q/16D; Singles – Doubles	(United States) Bethanie Mattek-Sands (Russia) Nadia Petrova; 5–7, 6–3, [10–7]	(Argentina) Gisela Dulko (Italy) Flavia Pennetta	(Italy) Flavia Pennetta (Russia) Elena Dementieva	(Poland) Agnieszka Radwańska (Serbia) Jelena Janković (Argentina) Gisela Dulko (France) Marion Bartoli
April 27	Grand Prix SAR La Princesse Lalla Meryem; Fez, Morocco; WTA International; Clay (red) – $220,000 – 32S/32Q/16D; Singles – Doubles	(Spain) Anabel Medina Garrigues; 6–0, 6–1	(Russia) Ekaterina Makarova	(Hungary) Melinda Czink (Russia) Alisa Kleybanova	(Spain) Lourdes Domínguez Lino (Czech Republic) Lucie Hradecká (Poland) Marta Domachowska (Slovenia) Polona Hercog
April 27	Grand Prix SAR La Princesse Lalla Meryem; Fez, Morocco; WTA International; Clay (red) – $220,000 – 32S/32Q/16D; Singles – Doubles	(Russia) Alisa Kleybanova (Russia) Ekaterina Makarova; 6–3, 2–6, [10–8]	(Romania) Sorana Cîrstea (Russia) Maria Kirilenko	(Hungary) Melinda Czink (Russia) Alisa Kleybanova	(Spain) Lourdes Domínguez Lino (Czech Republic) Lucie Hradecká (Poland) Marta Domachowska (Slovenia) Polona Hercog

=== May ===
Week	Tournament	Champions	Runners-up	Semifinalists	Quarterfinalists
May 4	Internazionali BNL d'Italia; Rome, Italy; WTA Premier 5 Clay (red) – $2,000,000 – 56S/32Q/28D; Singles – Doubles	(Russia) Dinara Safina; 6–3, 6–2	(Russia) Svetlana Kuznetsova	(United States) Venus Williams (Belarus) Victoria Azarenka	(Spain) María José Martínez Sánchez (Poland) Agnieszka Radwańska (Serbia) Jelena Janković (Estonia) Kaia Kanepi
May 4	Internazionali BNL d'Italia; Rome, Italy; WTA Premier 5 Clay (red) – $2,000,000 – 56S/32Q/28D; Singles – Doubles	(Chinese Taipei) Hsieh Su-wei (China) Peng Shuai; 7–5, 7–6^{(7–5)}	(Slovakia) Daniela Hantuchová (Japan) Ai Sugiyama	(United States) Venus Williams (Belarus) Victoria Azarenka	(Spain) María José Martínez Sánchez (Poland) Agnieszka Radwańska (Serbia) Jelena Janković (Estonia) Kaia Kanepi
May 4	Estoril Open; Oeiras, Portugal; WTA International; Clay (red) – $220,000 – 32S/32Q/16D; Singles – Doubles	(Belgium) Yanina Wickmayer; 7–5, 6–2	(Russia) Ekaterina Makarova	(Israel) Shahar Pe'er (Germany) Anna-Lena Grönefeld	(Slovakia) Jarmila Groth (Romania) Sorana Cîrstea (Germany) Sabine Lisicki (Russia) Maria Kirilenko
May 4	Estoril Open; Oeiras, Portugal; WTA International; Clay (red) – $220,000 – 32S/32Q/16D; Singles – Doubles	(United States) Raquel Kops-Jones (United States) Abigail Spears; 2–6, 6–3, [10–5]	(Canada) Sharon Fichman (Hungary) Katalin Marosi	(Israel) Shahar Pe'er (Germany) Anna-Lena Grönefeld	(Slovakia) Jarmila Groth (Romania) Sorana Cîrstea (Germany) Sabine Lisicki (Russia) Maria Kirilenko
May 11	Mutua Madrileña Madrid Open; Madrid, Spain; WTA Premier Mandatory; Clay (red) – $4,500,000 – 60S/32Q/28D; Singles – Doubles	(Russia) Dinara Safina; 6–2, 6–4	(Denmark) Caroline Wozniacki	(Switzerland) Patty Schnyder (France) Amélie Mauresmo	(Ukraine) Alona Bondarenko (Serbia) Jelena Janković (Hungary) Ágnes Szávay (Russia) Vera Dushevina
May 11	Mutua Madrileña Madrid Open; Madrid, Spain; WTA Premier Mandatory; Clay (red) – $4,500,000 – 60S/32Q/28D; Singles – Doubles	(Zimbabwe) Cara Black (United States) Liezel Huber; 4–6, 6–3, [10–6]	(Czech Republic) Květa Peschke (United States) Lisa Raymond	(Switzerland) Patty Schnyder (France) Amélie Mauresmo	(Ukraine) Alona Bondarenko (Serbia) Jelena Janković (Hungary) Ágnes Szávay (Russia) Vera Dushevina
May 18	Warsaw Open; Warsaw, Poland; WTA Premier; Clay (red) – $600,000 – 32S/32Q/16D; Singles – Doubles	(Romania) Alexandra Dulgheru; 7–6(3), 3–6, 6–0	(Ukraine) Alona Bondarenko	(United Kingdom) Anne Keothavong (Slovakia) Daniela Hantuchová	(Russia) Maria Sharapova (Romania) Ioana Raluca Olaru (Kazakhstan) Galina Voskoboeva (Czech Republic) Klára Zakopalová
May 18	Warsaw Open; Warsaw, Poland; WTA Premier; Clay (red) – $600,000 – 32S/32Q/16D; Singles – Doubles	(United States) Raquel Kops-Jones (United States) Bethanie Mattek-Sands; 6–1, 6–1	(China) Yan Zi (China) Zheng Jie	(United Kingdom) Anne Keothavong (Slovakia) Daniela Hantuchová	(Russia) Maria Sharapova (Romania) Ioana Raluca Olaru (Kazakhstan) Galina Voskoboeva (Czech Republic) Klára Zakopalová
May 18	Internationaux de Strasbourg; Strasbourg, France; WTA International; Clay (red) – $220,000 – 32S/32Q/16D; Singles – Doubles	(France) Aravane Rezaï; 7–6^{(7–2)}, 6–1	(Czech Republic) Lucie Hradecká	(Japan) Ayumi Morita (Ukraine) Viktoriya Kutuzova	(Germany) Kristina Barrois (China) Peng Shuai (France) Stéphanie Cohen-Aloro (Romania) Monica Niculescu
May 18	Internationaux de Strasbourg; Strasbourg, France; WTA International; Clay (red) – $220,000 – 32S/32Q/16D; Singles – Doubles	(France) Nathalie Dechy (Italy) Mara Santangelo; 6–0, 6–1	(France) Claire Feuerstein (France) Stéphanie Foretz	(Japan) Ayumi Morita (Ukraine) Viktoriya Kutuzova	(Germany) Kristina Barrois (China) Peng Shuai (France) Stéphanie Cohen-Aloro (Romania) Monica Niculescu
May 24; Jun 1	French Open; Paris, France; Grand Slam; Clay (red) – $10,009,638 – 128S/128Q/64D/32X; Singles – Doubles – Mixed doubles	(Russia) Svetlana Kuznetsova; 6–4, 6–2	(Russia) Dinara Safina	(Slovakia) Dominika Cibulková (Australia) Samantha Stosur	(Belarus) Victoria Azarenka (Russia) Maria Sharapova (Romania) Sorana Cîrstea (United States) Serena Williams
May 24; Jun 1	French Open; Paris, France; Grand Slam; Clay (red) – $10,009,638 – 128S/128Q/64D/32X; Singles – Doubles – Mixed doubles	(Spain) Anabel Medina Garrigues (Spain) Virginia Ruano Pascual; 6–1, 6–1	(Belarus) Victoria Azarenka (Russia) Elena Vesnina	(Slovakia) Dominika Cibulková (Australia) Samantha Stosur	(Belarus) Victoria Azarenka (Russia) Maria Sharapova (Romania) Sorana Cîrstea (United States) Serena Williams
May 24; Jun 1	French Open; Paris, France; Grand Slam; Clay (red) – $10,009,638 – 128S/128Q/64D/32X; Singles – Doubles – Mixed doubles	(United States) Bob Bryan (United States) Liezel Huber; 5–7, 7–6^{(7–5)}, 10–7	(Brazil) Marcelo Melo (United States) Vania King	(Slovakia) Dominika Cibulková (Australia) Samantha Stosur	(Belarus) Victoria Azarenka (Russia) Maria Sharapova (Romania) Sorana Cîrstea (United States) Serena Williams

=== June ===
Week	Tournament	Champions	Runners-up	Semifinalists	Quarterfinalists
Jun 8	Aegon Classic; Birmingham, Great Britain; WTA International; Grass – $220,000 – 56S/32Q/16D; Singles – Doubles	(Slovakia) Magdaléna Rybáriková; 6–0, 7–6^{(7–2)}	(China) Li Na	(India) Sania Mirza (Russia) Maria Sharapova	(Poland) Urszula Radwańska (Hungary) Melinda Czink (Switzerland) Stefanie Vögele (Belgium) Yanina Wickmayer
Jun 8	Aegon Classic; Birmingham, Great Britain; WTA International; Grass – $220,000 – 56S/32Q/16D; Singles – Doubles	(Zimbabwe) Cara Black (United States) Liezel Huber; 6–1, 6–4	(United States) Raquel Kops-Jones (United States) Abigail Spears	(India) Sania Mirza (Russia) Maria Sharapova	(Poland) Urszula Radwańska (Hungary) Melinda Czink (Switzerland) Stefanie Vögele (Belgium) Yanina Wickmayer
Jun 15	Aegon International; Eastbourne, Great Britain; WTA Premier; Grass – $600,000 – 32S/32Q/16D; Singles – Doubles	(Denmark) Caroline Wozniacki; 7–6^{(7–5)}, 7–5	(France) Virginie Razzano	(France) Marion Bartoli (Canada) Aleksandra Wozniak	(Poland) Agnieszka Radwańska (Spain) Anabel Medina Garrigues (Russia) Ekaterina Makarova (Russia) Vera Dushevina
Jun 15	Aegon International; Eastbourne, Great Britain; WTA Premier; Grass – $600,000 – 32S/32Q/16D; Singles – Doubles	(Uzbekistan) Akgul Amanmuradova (Japan) Ai Sugiyama; 6–4, 6–3	(Australia) Samantha Stosur (Australia) Rennae Stubbs	(France) Marion Bartoli (Canada) Aleksandra Wozniak	(Poland) Agnieszka Radwańska (Spain) Anabel Medina Garrigues (Russia) Ekaterina Makarova (Russia) Vera Dushevina
Jun 15	UNICEF Open 's-Hertogenbosch, Netherlands; WTA International; Grass – $220,000 – 32S/32Q/16D; Singles – Doubles	(Thailand) Tamarine Tanasugarn; 6–3, 7–5	(Belgium) Yanina Wickmayer	(Russia) Dinara Safina (Italy) Francesca Schiavone	(Slovakia) Daniela Hantuchová (Italy) Flavia Pennetta (Germany) Kristina Barrois (Belarus) Olga Govortsova
Jun 15	UNICEF Open 's-Hertogenbosch, Netherlands; WTA International; Grass – $220,000 – 32S/32Q/16D; Singles – Doubles	(Italy) Sara Errani (Italy) Flavia Pennetta; 6–4, 5–7, [13–11]	(Netherlands) Michaëlla Krajicek (Belgium) Yanina Wickmayer	(Russia) Dinara Safina (Italy) Francesca Schiavone	(Slovakia) Daniela Hantuchová (Italy) Flavia Pennetta (Germany) Kristina Barrois (Belarus) Olga Govortsova
Jun 22; Jun 29	Wimbledon Championships; London, Great Britain; Grand Slam; Grass – $9,487,267 – 128S/96Q/64D/48X; Singles – Doubles – Mixed doubles	(United States) Serena Williams; 7–6(3), 6–2	(United States) Venus Williams	(Russia) Dinara Safina (Russia) Elena Dementieva	(Germany) Sabine Lisicki (Poland) Agnieszka Radwańska (Italy) Francesca Schiavone (Belarus) Victoria Azarenka
Jun 22; Jun 29	Wimbledon Championships; London, Great Britain; Grand Slam; Grass – $9,487,267 – 128S/96Q/64D/48X; Singles – Doubles – Mixed doubles	(United States) Serena Williams (United States) Venus Williams; 7–6^{(7–4)}, 6–4	(Australia) Samantha Stosur (Australia) Rennae Stubbs	(Russia) Dinara Safina (Russia) Elena Dementieva	(Germany) Sabine Lisicki (Poland) Agnieszka Radwańska (Italy) Francesca Schiavone (Belarus) Victoria Azarenka
Jun 22; Jun 29	Wimbledon Championships; London, Great Britain; Grand Slam; Grass – $9,487,267 – 128S/96Q/64D/48X; Singles – Doubles – Mixed doubles	(The Bahamas) Mark Knowles (Germany) Anna-Lena Grönefeld; 7–5, 6–3	(India) Leander Paes (Zimbabwe) Cara Black	(Russia) Dinara Safina (Russia) Elena Dementieva	(Germany) Sabine Lisicki (Poland) Agnieszka Radwańska (Italy) Francesca Schiavone (Belarus) Victoria Azarenka

=== July ===
Week	Tournament	Champions	Runners-up	Semifinalists	Quarterfinalists
Jul 6	GDF Suez Grand Prix; Budapest, Hungary; WTA International; Clay (red) – $220,000 – 32S/32Q/16D; Singles – Doubles	(Hungary) Ágnes Szávay; 2–6, 6–4, 6–2	(Switzerland) Patty Schnyder	(Romania) Edina Gallovits (Ukraine) Alona Bondarenko	(Russia) Alisa Kleybanova (Croatia) Petra Martić (Switzerland) Timea Bacsinszky (Israel) Shahar Pe'er
Jul 6	GDF Suez Grand Prix; Budapest, Hungary; WTA International; Clay (red) – $220,000 – 32S/32Q/16D; Singles – Doubles	(Russia) Alisa Kleybanova (Romania) Monica Niculescu; 6–4, 7–6^{(7–5)}	(Ukraine) Alona Bondarenko (Ukraine) Kateryna Bondarenko	(Romania) Edina Gallovits (Ukraine) Alona Bondarenko	(Russia) Alisa Kleybanova (Croatia) Petra Martić (Switzerland) Timea Bacsinszky (Israel) Shahar Pe'er
Jul 6	Collector Swedish Open Women; Båstad, Sweden; WTA International; Clay (red) – $220,000 – 32S/32Q/16D; Singles – Doubles	(Spain) María José Martínez Sánchez; 7–5, 6–4	(Denmark) Caroline Wozniacki	(Italy) Flavia Pennetta (Argentina) Gisela Dulko	(Russia) Maria Kirilenko (Russia) Alla Kudryavtseva (Spain) Carla Suárez Navarro (Slovakia) Dominika Cibulková
Jul 6	Collector Swedish Open Women; Båstad, Sweden; WTA International; Clay (red) – $220,000 – 32S/32Q/16D; Singles – Doubles	(Argentina) Gisela Dulko (Italy) Flavia Pennetta; 6–2, 0–6, [10–5]	(Spain) Nuria Llagostera Vives (Spain) María José Martínez Sánchez	(Italy) Flavia Pennetta (Argentina) Gisela Dulko	(Russia) Maria Kirilenko (Russia) Alla Kudryavtseva (Spain) Carla Suárez Navarro (Slovakia) Dominika Cibulková
Jul 13	Internazionali Femminili di Palermo; Palermo, Italy; WTA International; Clay (red) – $220,000 – 32S/32Q/16D; Singles – Doubles	(Italy) Flavia Pennetta; 6–1, 6–2	(Italy) Sara Errani	(Italy) Tathiana Garbin (Germany) Anna-Lena Grönefeld	(France) Aravane Rezaï (Belarus) Olga Govortsova (Kazakhstan) Yaroslava Shvedova (Switzerland) Patty Schnyder
Jul 13	Internazionali Femminili di Palermo; Palermo, Italy; WTA International; Clay (red) – $220,000 – 32S/32Q/16D; Singles – Doubles	(Spain) Nuria Llagostera Vives (Spain) María José Martínez Sánchez; 6–1, 6–2	(Ukraine) Mariya Koryttseva (Belarus) Darya Kustova	(Italy) Tathiana Garbin (Germany) Anna-Lena Grönefeld	(France) Aravane Rezaï (Belarus) Olga Govortsova (Kazakhstan) Yaroslava Shvedova (Switzerland) Patty Schnyder
Jul 13	ECM Prague Open; Prague, Czech Republic; WTA International; Clay (red) – $220,000 – 32S/32Q/16D; Singles – Doubles	(Austria) Sybille Bammer; 7–6^{(7–4)}, 6–2	(Italy) Francesca Schiavone	(Switzerland) Timea Bacsinszky (Czech Republic) Iveta Benešová	(Ukraine) Kateryna Bondarenko (Spain) Carla Suárez Navarro (Kazakhstan) Zarina Diyas (Czech Republic) Lucie Hradecká
Jul 13	ECM Prague Open; Prague, Czech Republic; WTA International; Clay (red) – $220,000 – 32S/32Q/16D; Singles – Doubles	(Ukraine) Alona Bondarenko (Ukraine) Kateryna Bondarenko; 6–1, 6–2	(Czech Republic) Iveta Benešová (Czech Republic) Barbora Záhlavová-Strýcová	(Switzerland) Timea Bacsinszky (Czech Republic) Iveta Benešová	(Ukraine) Kateryna Bondarenko (Spain) Carla Suárez Navarro (Kazakhstan) Zarina Diyas (Czech Republic) Lucie Hradecká
Jul 20	Banka Koper Slovenia Open; Portorož, Slovenia; WTA International; Hard – $220,000 – 32S/32Q/16D; Singles – Doubles	(Russia) Dinara Safina; 6–7^{(5–7)}, 6–1, 7–5	(Italy) Sara Errani	(Italy) Alberta Brianti (Switzerland) Stefanie Vögele	(Italy) Maria Elena Camerin (France) Camille Pin (Paraguay) Rossana de los Ríos (Croatia) Petra Martić
Jul 20	Banka Koper Slovenia Open; Portorož, Slovenia; WTA International; Hard – $220,000 – 32S/32Q/16D; Singles – Doubles	(Germany) Julia Görges (Czech Republic) Vladimíra Uhlířová; 6–4, 6–2	(France) Camille Pin (Czech Republic) Klára Zakopalová	(Italy) Alberta Brianti (Switzerland) Stefanie Vögele	(Italy) Maria Elena Camerin (France) Camille Pin (Paraguay) Rossana de los Ríos (Croatia) Petra Martić
Jul 20	Gastein Ladies; Bad Gastein, Austria; WTA International; Clay (red) – $220,000 – 32S/32Q/16D; Singles – Doubles	(Germany) Andrea Petkovic; 6–2, 6–3	(Romania) Ioana Raluca Olaru	(France) Alizé Cornet (Kazakhstan) Yaroslava Shvedova	(Czech Republic) Barbora Záhlavová-Strýcová (Slovakia) Magdaléna Rybáriková (Germany) Anna-Lena Grönefeld (Austria) Yvonne Meusburger
Jul 20	Gastein Ladies; Bad Gastein, Austria; WTA International; Clay (red) – $220,000 – 32S/32Q/16D; Singles – Doubles	(Czech Republic) Andrea Hlaváčková (Czech Republic) Lucie Hradecká; 6–2, 6–4	(Germany) Tatjana Malek (Germany) Andrea Petkovic	(France) Alizé Cornet (Kazakhstan) Yaroslava Shvedova	(Czech Republic) Barbora Záhlavová-Strýcová (Slovakia) Magdaléna Rybáriková (Germany) Anna-Lena Grönefeld (Austria) Yvonne Meusburger
Jul 27	Bank of the West Classic; Stanford, United States; WTA Premier; Hard – $700,000 – 32S/32Q/16D; Singles – Doubles	(France) Marion Bartoli; 6–2, 5–7, 6–4	(United States) Venus Williams	(Australia) Samantha Stosur (Russia) Elena Dementieva	(United States) Serena Williams (Serbia) Jelena Janković (Slovakia) Daniela Hantuchová (Russia) Maria Sharapova
Jul 27	Bank of the West Classic; Stanford, United States; WTA Premier; Hard – $700,000 – 32S/32Q/16D; Singles – Doubles	(United States) Serena Williams (United States) Venus Williams; 6–4, 6–1	(Chinese Taipei) Chan Yung-jan (Romania) Monica Niculescu	(Australia) Samantha Stosur (Russia) Elena Dementieva	(United States) Serena Williams (Serbia) Jelena Janković (Slovakia) Daniela Hantuchová (Russia) Maria Sharapova
Jul 27	İstanbul Cup; Istanbul, Turkey; WTA International; Hard – $220,000 – 32S/32Q/16D; Singles – Doubles	(Russia) Vera Dushevina; 6–0, 6–1	(Czech Republic) Lucie Hradecká	(Switzerland) Timea Bacsinszky (Germany) Andrea Petkovic	(Poland) Urszula Radwańska (Spain) Anabel Medina Garrigues (Poland) Marta Domachowska (Belarus) Olga Govortsova
Jul 27	İstanbul Cup; Istanbul, Turkey; WTA International; Hard – $220,000 – 32S/32Q/16D; Singles – Doubles	(Czech Republic) Lucie Hradecká (Czech Republic) Renata Voráčová; 2–6, 6–3, [12–10]	(Germany) Julia Görges (Switzerland) Patty Schnyder	(Switzerland) Timea Bacsinszky (Germany) Andrea Petkovic	(Poland) Urszula Radwańska (Spain) Anabel Medina Garrigues (Poland) Marta Domachowska (Belarus) Olga Govortsova

=== August ===
Week	Tournament	Champions	Runners-up	Semifinalists	Quarterfinalists
Aug 3	Herbalife LA Tennis Championships; Carson, United States; WTA Premier; Hard – $700,000 – 56S/32Q/16D; Singles – Doubles	(Italy) Flavia Pennetta; 6–4, 6–3	(Australia) Samantha Stosur	(Romania) Sorana Cîrstea (Russia) Maria Sharapova	(China) Zheng Jie (Poland) Agnieszka Radwańska (Poland) Urszula Radwańska (Russia) Vera Zvonareva
Aug 3	Herbalife LA Tennis Championships; Carson, United States; WTA Premier; Hard – $700,000 – 56S/32Q/16D; Singles – Doubles	(Chinese Taipei) Chuang Chia-jung (China) Yan Zi; 6–0, 4–6, [10–7]	(Russia) Maria Kirilenko (Poland) Agnieszka Radwańska	(Romania) Sorana Cîrstea (Russia) Maria Sharapova	(China) Zheng Jie (Poland) Agnieszka Radwańska (Poland) Urszula Radwańska (Russia) Vera Zvonareva
Aug 10	W&S Financial Group Women's Open; Mason, United States; WTA Premier 5 Hard – $2,000,000 – 56S/32Q/28D; Singles – Doubles	(Serbia) Jelena Janković; 6–4, 6–2	(Russia) Dinara Safina	(Italy) Flavia Pennetta (Russia) Elena Dementieva	(Belgium) Kim Clijsters (Slovakia) Daniela Hantuchová (Denmark) Caroline Wozniacki (Austria) Sybille Bammer
Aug 10	W&S Financial Group Women's Open; Mason, United States; WTA Premier 5 Hard – $2,000,000 – 56S/32Q/28D; Singles – Doubles	(Zimbabwe) Cara Black (United States) Liezel Huber; 6–3, 0–6, [10–2]	(Spain) Nuria Llagostera Vives (Spain) María José Martínez Sánchez	(Italy) Flavia Pennetta (Russia) Elena Dementieva	(Belgium) Kim Clijsters (Slovakia) Daniela Hantuchová (Denmark) Caroline Wozniacki (Austria) Sybille Bammer
Aug 17	Rogers Cup; Toronto, Canada; WTA Premier 5 Hard – $2,000,000 – 56S/32Q/28D; Singles – Doubles	(Russia) Elena Dementieva; 6–4, 6–3	(Russia) Maria Sharapova	(Russia) Alisa Kleybanova (United States) Serena Williams	(Serbia) Jelena Janković (Poland) Agnieszka Radwańska (Australia) Samantha Stosur (Czech Republic) Lucie Šafářová
Aug 17	Rogers Cup; Toronto, Canada; WTA Premier 5 Hard – $2,000,000 – 56S/32Q/28D; Singles – Doubles	(Spain) Nuria Llagostera Vives (Spain) María José Martínez Sánchez; 2–6, 7–5, [11–9]	(Australia) Samantha Stosur (Australia) Rennae Stubbs	(Russia) Alisa Kleybanova (United States) Serena Williams	(Serbia) Jelena Janković (Poland) Agnieszka Radwańska (Australia) Samantha Stosur (Czech Republic) Lucie Šafářová
Aug 24	Pilot Pen Tennis; New Haven, United States; WTA Premier; Hard – $600,000 – 32S/32Q/16D; Singles – Doubles	(Denmark) Caroline Wozniacki; 6–2, 6–4	(Russia) Elena Vesnina	(France) Amélie Mauresmo (Italy) Flavia Pennetta	(Russia) Svetlana Kuznetsova (Russia) Anna Chakvetadze (Slovakia) Magdaléna Rybáriková (France) Virginie Razzano
Aug 24	Pilot Pen Tennis; New Haven, United States; WTA Premier; Hard – $600,000 – 32S/32Q/16D; Singles – Doubles	(Spain) Nuria Llagostera Vives (Spain) María José Martínez Sánchez; 6–2, 7–5	(Czech Republic) Iveta Benešová (Czech Republic) Lucie Hradecká	(France) Amélie Mauresmo (Italy) Flavia Pennetta	(Russia) Svetlana Kuznetsova (Russia) Anna Chakvetadze (Slovakia) Magdaléna Rybáriková (France) Virginie Razzano
Aug 31; Sep 7	US Open; New York City, United States; Grand Slam; Hard – $9,756,000 – 128S/128Q/64D/32X; Singles – Doubles – Mixed doubles	(Belgium) Kim Clijsters; 7–5, 6–3	(Denmark) Caroline Wozniacki	(Belgium) Yanina Wickmayer (United States) Serena Williams	(Ukraine) Kateryna Bondarenko (United States) Melanie Oudin (China) Li Na (Italy) Flavia Pennetta
Aug 31; Sep 7	US Open; New York City, United States; Grand Slam; Hard – $9,756,000 – 128S/128Q/64D/32X; Singles – Doubles – Mixed doubles	(United States) Serena Williams (United States) Venus Williams; 6–2, 6–2	(Zimbabwe) Cara Black (United States) Liezel Huber	(Belgium) Yanina Wickmayer (United States) Serena Williams	(Ukraine) Kateryna Bondarenko (United States) Melanie Oudin (China) Li Na (Italy) Flavia Pennetta
Aug 31; Sep 7	US Open; New York City, United States; Grand Slam; Hard – $9,756,000 – 128S/128Q/64D/32X; Singles – Doubles – Mixed doubles	(United States) Travis Parrott (United States) Carly Gullickson; 6–2, 6–4	(India) Leander Paes (Zimbabwe) Cara Black	(Belgium) Yanina Wickmayer (United States) Serena Williams	(Ukraine) Kateryna Bondarenko (United States) Melanie Oudin (China) Li Na (Italy) Flavia Pennetta

=== September ===
Week	Tournament	Champions	Runners-up	Semifinalists	Quarterfinalists
Sep 14	Guangzhou International Women's Open; Guangzhou, China; WTA International; Hard – $220,000 – 32S/32Q/16D; Singles – Doubles	(Israel) Shahar Pe'er; 6–3, 6–4	(Italy) Alberta Brianti	(Japan) Ayumi Morita (China) Peng Shuai	(Latvia) Anastasija Sevastova (Ukraine) Olga Savchuk (Russia) Alexandra Panova (Chinese Taipei) Chan Yung-jan
Sep 14	Guangzhou International Women's Open; Guangzhou, China; WTA International; Hard – $220,000 – 32S/32Q/16D; Singles – Doubles	(Belarus) Olga Govortsova (Belarus) Tatiana Poutchek; 3–6, 6–2, [10–8]	(Japan) Kimiko Date-Krumm (China) Sun Tiantian	(Japan) Ayumi Morita (China) Peng Shuai	(Latvia) Anastasija Sevastova (Ukraine) Olga Savchuk (Russia) Alexandra Panova (Chinese Taipei) Chan Yung-jan
Sep 14	Bell Challenge présenté par Banque Nationale; Quebec City, Canada; WTA International; Carpet – $220,000 – 32S/32Q/16D; Singles – Doubles	(Hungary) Melinda Czink; 4–6, 6–3, 7–5	(Czech Republic) Lucie Šafářová	(Canada) Aleksandra Wozniak (Germany) Julia Görges	(Russia) Nadia Petrova (Russia) Alla Kudryavtseva (United States) Bethanie Mattek-Sands (United States) Lilia Osterloh
Sep 14	Bell Challenge présenté par Banque Nationale; Quebec City, Canada; WTA International; Carpet – $220,000 – 32S/32Q/16D; Singles – Doubles	(United States) Vania King (Czech Republic) Barbora Záhlavová-Strýcová; 6–1, 6–3	(Sweden) Sofia Arvidsson (France) Séverine Brémond Beltrame	(Canada) Aleksandra Wozniak (Germany) Julia Görges	(Russia) Nadia Petrova (Russia) Alla Kudryavtseva (United States) Bethanie Mattek-Sands (United States) Lilia Osterloh
Sep 21	Hansol Korea Open; Seoul, South Korea; WTA International; Hard – $220,000 – 32S/32Q/16D; Singles – Doubles	(Japan) Kimiko Date-Krumm; 6–3, 6–3	(Spain) Anabel Medina Garrigues	(Russia) Maria Kirilenko (Germany) Anna-Lena Grönefeld	(Slovakia) Daniela Hantuchová (Russia) Vera Dushevina (Chinese Taipei) Chan Yung-jan (Slovakia) Magdaléna Rybáriková
Sep 21	Hansol Korea Open; Seoul, South Korea; WTA International; Hard – $220,000 – 32S/32Q/16D; Singles – Doubles	(Chinese Taipei) Chan Yung-jan (United States) Abigail Spears; 6–3, 6–4	(United States) Carly Gullickson (Australia) Nicole Kriz	(Russia) Maria Kirilenko (Germany) Anna-Lena Grönefeld	(Slovakia) Daniela Hantuchová (Russia) Vera Dushevina (Chinese Taipei) Chan Yung-jan (Slovakia) Magdaléna Rybáriková
Sep 21	Tashkent Open; Tashkent, Uzbekistan; WTA International; Hard – $220,000 – 32S/32Q/16D; Singles – Doubles	(Israel) Shahar Pe'er; 6–3, 6–4	(Uzbekistan) Akgul Amanmuradova	(Kazakhstan) Yaroslava Shvedova (Belarus) Olga Govortsova	(Romania) Monica Niculescu (Switzerland) Stefanie Vögele (Belarus) Darya Kustova (Russia) Alexandra Panova
Sep 21	Tashkent Open; Tashkent, Uzbekistan; WTA International; Hard – $220,000 – 32S/32Q/16D; Singles – Doubles	(Belarus) Olga Govortsova (Belarus) Tatiana Poutchek; 6–2, 6–7^{(1–7)}, [10–8]	(Russia) Vitalia Diatchenko (Belarus) Ekaterina Dzehalevich	(Kazakhstan) Yaroslava Shvedova (Belarus) Olga Govortsova	(Romania) Monica Niculescu (Switzerland) Stefanie Vögele (Belarus) Darya Kustova (Russia) Alexandra Panova
Sep 28	Toray Pan Pacific Open; Tokyo, Japan; WTA Premier 5 Hard – $2,000,000 – 56S/32Q/16D; Singles – Doubles	(Russia) Maria Sharapova; 5–2 retired	(Serbia) Jelena Janković	(Poland) Agnieszka Radwańska (China) Li Na	(Czech Republic) Iveta Benešová (Slovakia) Magdaléna Rybáriková (Belarus) Victoria Azarenka (France) Marion Bartoli
Sep 28	Toray Pan Pacific Open; Tokyo, Japan; WTA Premier 5 Hard – $2,000,000 – 56S/32Q/16D; Singles – Doubles	(Russia) Alisa Kleybanova (Italy) Francesca Schiavone; 6–4, 6–2	(Slovakia) Daniela Hantuchová (Japan) Ai Sugiyama	(Poland) Agnieszka Radwańska (China) Li Na	(Czech Republic) Iveta Benešová (Slovakia) Magdaléna Rybáriková (Belarus) Victoria Azarenka (France) Marion Bartoli

=== October ===
Week	Tournament	Champions	Runners-up	Semifinalists	Quarterfinalists
Oct 5	China Open; Beijing, China; WTA Premier Mandatory; Hard – $4,500,000 – 60S/32Q/28D; Singles – Doubles	(Russia) Svetlana Kuznetsova; 6–2, 6–4	(Poland) Agnieszka Radwańska	(France) Marion Bartoli (Russia) Nadia Petrova	(Russia) Vera Zvonareva (Russia) Elena Dementieva (Russia) Anastasia Pavlyuchenkova (China) Peng Shuai
Oct 5	China Open; Beijing, China; WTA Premier Mandatory; Hard – $4,500,000 – 60S/32Q/28D; Singles – Doubles	(Chinese Taipei) Hsieh Su-wei (China) Peng Shuai; 6–3, 6–1	(Russia) Alla Kudryavtseva (Russia) Ekaterina Makarova	(France) Marion Bartoli (Russia) Nadia Petrova	(Russia) Vera Zvonareva (Russia) Elena Dementieva (Russia) Anastasia Pavlyuchenkova (China) Peng Shuai
Oct 12	Generali Ladies Linz; Linz, Austria; WTA International; Hard (i) – $220,000 – 32S/32Q/16D; Singles – Doubles	(Belgium) Yanina Wickmayer; 6–3, 6–4	(Czech Republic) Petra Kvitová	(Italy) Flavia Pennetta (Poland) Agnieszka Radwańska	(Romania) Ioana Raluca Olaru (Italy) Sara Errani (Spain) Carla Suárez Navarro (Czech Republic) Lucie Šafářová
Oct 12	Generali Ladies Linz; Linz, Austria; WTA International; Hard (i) – $220,000 – 32S/32Q/16D; Singles – Doubles	(Germany) Anna-Lena Grönefeld (Slovenia) Katarina Srebotnik; 6–1, 6–4	(Poland) Klaudia Jans (Poland) Alicja Rosolska	(Italy) Flavia Pennetta (Poland) Agnieszka Radwańska	(Romania) Ioana Raluca Olaru (Italy) Sara Errani (Spain) Carla Suárez Navarro (Czech Republic) Lucie Šafářová
Oct 12	HP Open; Osaka, Japan; WTA International; Hard – $220,000 – 32S/32Q/16D; Singles – Doubles	(Australia) Samantha Stosur; 7–5, 6–1	(Italy) Francesca Schiavone	(Denmark) Caroline Wozniacki (India) Sania Mirza	(Canada) Aleksandra Wozniak (United States) Jill Craybas (Hungary) Melinda Czink (France) Marion Bartoli
Oct 12	HP Open; Osaka, Japan; WTA International; Hard – $220,000 – 32S/32Q/16D; Singles – Doubles	(Chinese Taipei) Chuang Chia-jung (United States) Lisa Raymond; 6–2, 6–4	(South Africa) Chanelle Scheepers (United States) Abigail Spears	(Denmark) Caroline Wozniacki (India) Sania Mirza	(Canada) Aleksandra Wozniak (United States) Jill Craybas (Hungary) Melinda Czink (France) Marion Bartoli
Oct 19	Kremlin Cup; Moscow, Russia; WTA Premier; Hard (i) – $1,000,000 – 32S/32Q/16D; Singles – Doubles	(Italy) Francesca Schiavone; 6–3, 6–0	(Belarus) Olga Govortsova	(Ukraine) Alona Bondarenko (Russia) Alisa Kleybanova	(Bulgaria) Tsvetana Pironkova (Russia) Maria Kirilenko (Russia) Vera Dushevina (Serbia) Jelena Janković
Oct 19	Kremlin Cup; Moscow, Russia; WTA Premier; Hard (i) – $1,000,000 – 32S/32Q/16D; Singles – Doubles	(Russia) Maria Kirilenko (Russia) Nadia Petrova; 6–2, 6–2	(Russia) Maria Kondratieva (Czech Republic) Klára Zakopalová	(Ukraine) Alona Bondarenko (Russia) Alisa Kleybanova	(Bulgaria) Tsvetana Pironkova (Russia) Maria Kirilenko (Russia) Vera Dushevina (Serbia) Jelena Janković
Oct 19	BGL Luxembourg Open; Kockelscheuer, Luxembourg; WTA International; Hard (i) – $220,000 – 32S/32Q/16D; Singles – Doubles	(Switzerland) Timea Bacsinszky; 6–2, 7–5	(Germany) Sabine Lisicki	(Belgium) Yanina Wickmayer (Israel) Shahar Pe'er	(Slovenia) Katarina Srebotnik (Belgium) Kirsten Flipkens (Slovakia) Daniela Hantuchová (Switzerland) Patty Schnyder
Oct 19	BGL Luxembourg Open; Kockelscheuer, Luxembourg; WTA International; Hard (i) – $220,000 – 32S/32Q/16D; Singles – Doubles	(Czech Republic) Iveta Benešová (Czech Republic) Barbora Záhlavová-Strýcová; 1–6, 6–0, [10–7]	(Czech Republic) Vladimíra Uhlířová (Czech Republic) Renata Voráčová	(Belgium) Yanina Wickmayer (Israel) Shahar Pe'er	(Slovenia) Katarina Srebotnik (Belgium) Kirsten Flipkens (Slovakia) Daniela Hantuchová (Switzerland) Patty Schnyder
Oct 26	Sony Ericsson Championships; Doha, Qatar; Year-end championships Hard – $4,550,000 – 8S (RR)/4D; Singles – Doubles	(United States) Serena Williams; 6–2, 7–6^{(7–4)}	(United States) Venus Williams	(Denmark) Caroline Wozniacki (Serbia) Jelena Janković	Round robin (Russia) Dinara Safina (Belarus) Victoria Azarenka (Russia) Vera Zvonareva (Poland) Agnieszka Radwańska (Russia) Svetlana Kuznetsova (Russia) Elena Dementieva
Oct 26	Sony Ericsson Championships; Doha, Qatar; Year-end championships Hard – $4,550,000 – 8S (RR)/4D; Singles – Doubles	(Spain) Nuria Llagostera Vives (Spain) María José Martínez Sánchez; 7–6^{(7–0)}, 5–7, [10–7]	(Zimbabwe) Cara Black (United States) Liezel Huber	(Denmark) Caroline Wozniacki (Serbia) Jelena Janković	Round robin (Russia) Dinara Safina (Belarus) Victoria Azarenka (Russia) Vera Zvonareva (Poland) Agnieszka Radwańska (Russia) Svetlana Kuznetsova (Russia) Elena Dementieva

=== November ===
Week	Tournament	Champions	Runners-up	Semifinalists	Round robin
Nov 2	Commonwealth Bank; Tournament of Champions; Bali, Indonesia; Year-end championships Hard (i) – $600,000 – 12S; Singles	(France) Aravane Rezaï; 7–5 retired	(France) Marion Bartoli	(Japan) Kimiko Date-Krumm (Spain) María José Martínez Sánchez	(Israel) Shahar Pe'er (Slovakia) Magdaléna Rybáriková (Australia) Samantha Stosur (Hungary) Ágnes Szávay (Belgium) Yanina Wickmayer (Spain) Anabel Medina Garrigues (Russia) Vera Dushevina (Germany) Sabine Lisicki (Hungary) Melinda Czink
Nov 2	Fed Cup: Final; Reggio Calabria, Italy, Clay	Italy 4–0	United States		

== Statistical information ==
These tables present the number of singles (S), doubles (D), and mixed doubles (X) titles won by each player and each nation during the season, within all the tournament categories of the 2009 WTA Tour: the Grand Slam tournaments, the Year-end championships, the WTA Premier tournaments and the WTA International tournaments. The players/nations are sorted by:

1. total number of titles (a doubles title won by two players representing the same nation counts as only one win for the nation);
2. highest amount of highest category tournaments (for example, having a single Grand Slam gives preference over any kind of combination without a Grand Slam title);
3. a singles > doubles > mixed doubles hierarchy;
4. alphabetical order (by family names for players).

=== Titles won by player ===
Total titles	Player	Grand Slam tournaments			Year-end championships		Premier tournaments		International tournaments		All titles		
Total titles	Player	Singles	Doubles	Mixed	Singles	Doubles	Singles	Doubles	Singles	Doubles	Singles	Doubles	Mixed
9	(Spain) María José Martínez Sánchez					1		2	2	4	2	7	0
7	(United States) Serena Williams	2	3		1			1			3	4	0
7	(Spain) Nuria Llagostera Vives					1		2		4	0	7	0
6	(United States) Venus Williams		3				1	1	1		2	4	0
6	(United States) Liezel Huber			1				4		1	0	5	1
5	(Belarus) Victoria Azarenka						1	1	2	1	3	2	0
5	(Italy) Flavia Pennetta						1		1	3	2	3	0
5	(Zimbabwe) Cara Black							4		1	0	5	0
4	(Russia) Svetlana Kuznetsova	1					2	1			3	1	0
4	(Denmark) Caroline Wozniacki						2		1	1	3	1	0
3	(Germany) Anna-Lena Grönefeld			1						2	0	2	1
3	(Russia) Dinara Safina						2		1		3	0	0
3	(Russia) Elena Dementieva						2		1		3	0	0
3	(Russia) Vera Zvonareva						1	1	1		2	1	0
3	(Chinese Taipei) Hsieh Su-wei							3			0	3	0
3	(United States) Bethanie Mattek-Sands							3			0	3	0
3	(China) Peng Shuai							3			0	3	0
3	(Russia) Nadia Petrova							3			0	3	0
3	(Chinese Taipei) Chuang Chia-jung							1		3	0	3	0
3	(Russia) Alisa Kleybanova							1		2	0	3	0
3	(France) Nathalie Dechy									3	0	3	0
3	(Italy) Mara Santangelo									3	0	3	0
2	(Spain) Anabel Medina Garrigues		1						1		1	1	0
2	(India) Sania Mirza			1						1	0	1	1
2	(France) Aravane Rezaï				1				1		2	0	0
2	(France) Amélie Mauresmo						1	1			1	1	0
2	(Italy) Francesca Schiavone						1	1			1	1	0
2	(France) Marion Bartoli						1		1		2	0	0
2	(Serbia) Jelena Janković						1		1		2	0	0
2	(United States) Raquel Kops-Jones							1		1	0	2	0
2	(Israel) Shahar Pe'er								2		2	0	0
2	(Belgium) Yanina Wickmayer								2		2	0	0
2	(Thailand) Tamarine Tanasugarn								1	1	1	1	0
2	(Argentina) Gisela Dulko									2	0	2	0
2	(Belarus) Olga Govortsova									2	0	2	0
2	(Czech Republic) Lucie Hradecká									2	0	2	0
2	(United States) Vania King									2	0	2	0
2	(Belarus) Tatiana Poutchek									2	0	2	0
2	(United States) Abigail Spears									2	0	2	0
2	(Czech Republic) Barbora Záhlavová-Strýcová									2	0	2	0
1	(Belgium) Kim Clijsters	1									1	0	0
1	(Spain) Virginia Ruano Pascual		1								0	1	0
1	(United States) Carly Gullickson			1							0	0	1
1	(Romania) Alexandra Dulgheru						1				1	0	0
1	(Germany) Sabine Lisicki						1				1	0	0
1	(Russia) Maria Sharapova						1				1	0	0
1	(Uzbekistan) Akgul Amanmuradova							1			0	1	0
1	(Russia) Maria Kirilenko							1			0	1	0
1	(Japan) Ai Sugiyama							1			0	1	0
1	(China) Yan Zi							1			0	1	0
1	(Switzerland) Timea Bacsinszky								1		1	0	0
1	(Austria) Sybille Bammer								1		1	0	0
1	(Hungary) Melinda Czink								1		1	0	0
1	(Japan) Kimiko Date-Krumm								1		1	0	0
1	(Russia) Vera Dushevina								1		1	0	0
1	(Czech Republic) Petra Kvitová								1		1	0	0
1	(Germany) Andrea Petkovic								1		1	0	0
1	(Slovakia) Magdaléna Rybáriková								1		1	0	0
1	(Australia) Samantha Stosur								1		1	0	0
1	(Hungary) Ágnes Szávay								1		1	0	0
1	(Italy) Roberta Vinci								1		1	0	0
1	(Czech Republic) Iveta Benešová									1	0	1	0
1	(Ukraine) Alona Bondarenko									1	0	1	0
1	(Ukraine) Kateryna Bondarenko									1	0	1	0
1	(Chinese Taipei) Chan Yung-jan									1	0	1	0
1	(Italy) Sara Errani									1	0	1	0
1	(Germany) Julia Görges									1	0	1	0
1	(Czech Republic) Andrea Hlaváčková									1	0	1	0
1	(Poland) Klaudia Jans									1	0	1	0
1	(Russia) Ekaterina Makarova									1	0	1	0
1	(Romania) Monica Niculescu									1	0	1	0
1	(United States) Lisa Raymond									1	0	1	0
1	(Poland) Alicja Rosolska									1	0	1	0
1	(Kazakhstan) Yaroslava Shvedova									1	0	1	0
1	(Slovenia) Katarina Srebotnik									1	0	1	0
1	(Czech Republic) Vladimíra Uhlířová									1	0	1	0
1	(Czech Republic) Renata Voráčová									1	0	1	0

=== Titles won by nation ===
Total titles	Player	Grand Slam tournaments			Year-end championships		Premier tournaments		International tournaments		All titles		
Total titles	Player	Singles	Doubles	Mixed	Singles	Doubles	Singles	Doubles	Singles	Doubles	Singles	Doubles	Mixed
24	United States	2	3	2	1		1	8	1	6	5	17	2
21	Russia	1					8	6	4	2	13	8	0
11	Spain		1			1		2	3	4	3	8	0
11	Italy						2	1	2	6	4	7	0
10	France				1		2	1	2	4	5	5	0
7	Belarus						1	1	2	3	3	4	0
7	Chinese Taipei							4		3	0	7	0
6	Germany			1			1		1	3	2	3	1
6	Czech Republic								1	5	1	5	0
5	Zimbabwe							4		1	0	5	0
4	Denmark						2		1	1	3	1	0
4	China							4			0	4	0
3	Belgium	1							2		3	0	0
2	India			1						1	0	1	1
2	Serbia						1		1		2	0	0
2	Romania						1			1	1	1	0
2	Japan							1	1		1	1	0
2	Hungary								2		2	0	0
2	Israel								2		2	0	0
2	Thailand								1	1	1	1	0
2	Argentina									2	0	2	0
1	Uzbekistan							1			0	1	0
1	Australia								1		1	0	0
1	Austria								1		1	0	0
1	Slovakia								1		1	0	0
1	Switzerland								1		1	0	0
1	Kazakhstan									1	0	1	0
1	Poland									1	0	1	0
1	Slovenia									1	0	1	0
1	Ukraine									1	0	1	0

=== Titles information ===
The following players won their first singles title:

- (Belarus) Victoria Azarenka – Brisbane
- (Czech Republic) Petra Kvitová – Hobart
- (Spain) María José Martínez Sánchez – Bogotá
- (Germany) Sabine Lisicki – Charleston
- (Belgium) Yanina Wickmayer – Estoril
- (Romania) Alexandra Dulgheru – Warsaw
- (France) Aravane Rezaï – Strasbourg
- (Slovakia) Magdaléna Rybáriková – Birmingham
- (Germany) Andrea Petkovic – Bad Gastein
- (Russia) Vera Dushevina – Istanbul
- (Hungary) Melinda Czink – Quebec City
- (Australia) Samantha Stosur – Osaka
- (Switzerland) Timea Bacsinszky – Luxembourg City

The following players completed a successful singles title defence:

- (Thailand) Tamarine Tanasugarn – 's-Hertogenbosch
- (Denmark) Caroline Wozniacki – New Haven

== Rankings ==
=== Singles ===
The following is the 2009 top 20 in the Race To The Championships. Premier Mandatory Events are counted even if the player did not compete, if there is no injury excuse, it is counted as one of their events, when you are in the top 10. Players in gold are players who competed in the 2009 WTA Tour Championships.

Race Singles
Rk	Name	Nation	Points	Tour
1	Dinara Safina	RUS	7731	18
2	Serena Williams	USA	7576	17
3	Svetlana Kuznetsova	RUS	5772	18
4	Caroline Wozniacki	DEN	5475	24
5	Elena Dementieva	RUS	5415	19
6	Victoria Azarenka	BLR	4451	16
7	Venus Williams	USA	4397	16
8	Jelena Janković	SRB	3555	18
9	Vera Zvonareva	RUS	3550	19
10	Agnieszka Radwańska	POL	3340	22
11	Flavia Pennetta	ITA	3150	24
12	Marion Bartoli	FRA	3105	23
13	Samantha Stosur	AUS	2945	20
14	Maria Sharapova	RUS	2820	16
15	Li Na	CHN	2541	18
16	Francesca Schiavone	ITA	2375	27
17	Kim Clijsters	BEL	2340	4
18	Virginie Razzano	FRA	2300	21
19	Yanina Wickmayer	BEL	2290	19
20	Nadia Petrova	RUS	2220	22

Singles Year-end Ranking
Rk	Name	Nation	Points	Change
1	Serena Williams	USA	9,075	▲1
2	Dinara Safina	RUS	7,800	▲1
3	Svetlana Kuznetsova	RUS	6,141	▲5
4	Caroline Wozniacki	DEN	5,875	▲8
5	Elena Dementieva	RUS	5,585	▼1
6	Venus Williams	USA	5,126	Steady
7	Victoria Azarenka	BLR	4,820	▲8
8	Jelena Janković	SRB	3,965	▼7
9	Vera Zvonareva	RUS	3,560	▼2
10	Agnieszka Radwańska	POL	3,450	Steady
11	Marion Bartoli	FRA	3,415	▲6
12	Flavia Pennetta	ITA	3,150	▲1
13	Samantha Stosur	AUS	3,045	▲39
14	Maria Sharapova	RUS	2,820	▼5
15	Li Na	CHN	2,541	▲8
16	Yanina Wickmayer	BEL	2,385	▲53
17	Francesca Schiavone	ITA	2,375	▲13
18	Kim Clijsters	BEL	2,340	▲NR
19	Virginie Razzano	FRA	2,300	▲40
20	Nadia Petrova	RUS	2,220	▼9

==== Number 1 ranking ====
Holder	Date gained	Date forfeited
Jelena Janković (SRB)	Year-End 2008	1 February 2009
Serena Williams (USA)	2 February 2009	19 April 2009
Dinara Safina (RUS)	20 April 2009	11 October 2009
Serena Williams (USA)	12 October 2009	25 October 2009
Dinara Safina (RUS)	26 October 2009	1 November 2009
Serena Williams (USA)	2 November 2009	Year-End 2009

=== Doubles ===
Race Rankings Team
Rk	Name	Points	Tour
1	(Zimbabwe) Cara Black (United States) Liezel Huber	9100	20
2	(United States) Venus Williams (United States) Serena Williams	6750	5
3	(Spain) Nuria Llagostera Vives (Spain) María José Martínez Sánchez	6397	20
4	(Australia) Rennae Stubbs (Australia) Samantha Stosur	5048	15
5	(China) Peng Shuai (Chinese Taipei) Hsieh Su-wei	4286	11
6	(Slovakia) Daniela Hantuchová (Japan) Ai Sugiyama	4192	15
7	(Spain) Anabel Medina Garrigues (Spain) Virginia Ruano Pascual	4128	13
8	(Czech Republic) Květa Peschke (United States) Lisa Raymond	3206	12
9	(United States) Bethanie Mattek-Sands (Russia) Nadia Petrova	3031	12
10	(China) Yan Zi (China) Zheng Jie	2482	11

Doubles Year-end Rankings
Rk	Name	Nation	Points	Change
1	Cara Black	ZIM	8,520	Steady
=	Liezel Huber	USA	8,520	Steady
3	Serena Williams	USA	7,440	▲25
=	Venus Williams	USA	7,440	▲20
5	Nuria Llagostera Vives	ESP	6,180	▲25
6	María José Martínez Sánchez	ESP	6,180	▲24
7	Samantha Stosur	AUS	5,610	▲7
=	Rennae Stubbs	AUS	5,610	▲2
9	Hsieh Su-wei	TPE	4,730	▲42
10	Virginia Ruano Pascual	ESP	4,670	▼5
11	Anabel Medina Garrigues	ESP	4,600	▼8
12	Peng Shuai	CHN	4,550	▲15
13	Daniela Hantuchová	SVK	4,180	▲41
14	Alisa Kleybanova	RUS	4,150	▲69
15	Victoria Azarenka	BLR	3,801	▼3
16	Nadia Petrova	RUS	3,735	▲4
17	Bethanie Mattek-Sands	USA	3,620	▲9
18	Lisa Raymond	USA	3,560	▼10
19	Francesca Schiavone	ITA	3,540	▲13
20	Ekaterina Makarova	RUS	3,510	▲42

==== Number 1 ranking ====
Holder	Dates Held
Cara Black (ZIM); Liezel Huber (USA)	Held Through The Entirety of 2009

== WTA prize money leaders ==
Serena Williams topped the money list for the 2nd consecutive season and for the 3rd time overall. In doing so, she also became the first woman to win $6,000,000 in a single season. The top-12 players earned over $1,000,000.

As of 16 November 2009

#	Country	Player	Singles	Doubles	Bonus Pool ^{1}	Year-to-date
1.	USA	Serena Williams	$5,584,437	$636,149	$325,000	$6,545,586
2.	RUS	Dinara Safina	$3,601,325	$8,893	$700,000	$4,310,218
3.	RUS	Svetlana Kuznetsova	$3,280,865	$152,976	$225,000	$3,658,841
4.	USA	Venus Williams	$2,240,745	$636,149	$250,000	$3,126,894
5.	SRB	Jelena Janković	$1,491,514	$0	$1,000,000	$2,491,514
6.	DEN	Caroline Wozniacki	$2,324,692	$46,858	$0	$2,371,550
7.	RUS	Elena Dementieva	$1,880,156	$825	$462,500	$2,343,481
8.	BLR	Victoria Azarenka	$1,827,770	$287,766	$0	$2,115,536
9.	RUS	Vera Zvonareva	$1,447,361	$144,784	$50,000	$1,642,145
10.	BEL	Kim Clijsters	$1,630,150	$2,410	$0	$1,632,560

^{1} Only for 2008 year-end top 10, Certain players receive fines for skipping events

== Statistics leaders ==
As of November 16, 2009. Source

Aces
	Player	Aces	Matches
1	(United States) Serena Williams	381	62
2	(Russia) Nadia Petrova	306	51
3	(United States) Venus Williams	277	54
4	(Australia) Samantha Stosur	277	58
5	(Germany) Sabine Lisicki	243	46
6	(Russia) Alisa Kleybanova	215	53
7	(Czech Republic) Lucie Šafářová	202	55
8	(Russia) Svetlana Kuznetsova	200	56
9	(Italy) Flavia Pennetta	199	75
10	(Slovakia) Magdaléna Rybáriková	189	52

Service games won
	Player	%	Matches
1	(United States) Serena Williams	77.6	62
2	(United States) Venus Williams	77.6	54
3	(Australia) Samantha Stosur	75.7	58
4	(Czech Republic) Lucie Šafářová	75.7	55
5	(Russia) Svetlana Kuznetsova	74.4	56
6	(Russia) Vera Zvonareva	74.3	47
7	(Russia) Nadia Petrova	72.4	51
8	(Germany) Sabine Lisicki	72.2	46
9	(Denmark) Caroline Wozniacki	71.7	91
10	(Germany) Kristina Barrois	71.5	24

Break points saved
	Player	%	Matches
1	(Australia) Samantha Stosur	63.2	58
2	(United States) Venus Williams	62.0	54
3	(Russia) Vera Zvonareva	60.8	47
4	(Germany) Kristina Barrois	60.5	24
5	(Serbia) Ana Ivanovic	59.8	35
6	(Czech Republic) Iveta Benešová	58.7	54
7	(France) Amélie Mauresmo	59.5	37
8	(Switzerland) Patty Schnyder	59.4	43
9	(France) Virginie Razzano	59.3	50
10	(Russia) Elena Dementieva	59.1	72

First-serve percentage
	Player	%	Matches
1	(Romania) Monica Niculescu	72.3	32
2	(Ukraine) Alona Bondarenko	72.1	55
3	(Belarus) Victoria Azarenka	72.0	60
4	(Austria) Patricia Mayr	71.6	28
5	(China) Zheng Jie	70.6	48
6	(Italy) Sara Errani	70.2	52
7	(Czech Republic) Barbora Záhlavová-Strýcová	69.7	32
8	(Austria) Sybille Bammer	69.5	43
9	(Denmark) Caroline Wozniacki	68.8	91
10	(Spain) Carla Suárez Navarro	67.8	54

First-service points won
	Player	%	Matches
1	(United States) Serena Williams	73.5	62
2	(United States) Venus Williams	72.1	54
3	(Germany) Sabine Lisicki	71.1	46
4	(Russia) Nadia Petrova	70.8	51
5	(Czech Republic) Lucie Šafářová	69.6	55
6	(Czech Republic) Lucie Hradecká	69.6	25
7	(Australia) Samantha Stosur	68.4	58
8	(Germany) Kristina Barrois	67.7	24
9	(Russia) Vera Zvonareva	67.6	47
10	(Italy) Flavia Pennetta	67.1	75

Second-serve points won
	Player	%	Matches
1	(Russia) Svetlana Kuznetsova	50.6	56
2	(Switzerland) Patty Schnyder	50.5	43
3	(Australia) Samantha Stosur	49.5	58
4	(Denmark) Caroline Wozniacki	49.4	91
5	(Czech Republic) Lucie Šafářová	49.3	55
6	(Austria) Patricia Mayr	49.2	28
7	(China) Li Na	49.1	51
8	(France) Virginie Razzano	49	50
9	(Kazakhstan) Yaroslava Shvedova	48.6	35
10	(United States) Venus Williams	48.6	54

Points won returning 1st service
	Player	%	Matches
1	(Russia) Dinara Safina	43.1	71
2	(Russia) Elena Dementieva	42.5	72
3	(Belarus) Victoria Azarenka	42.5	60
4	(Denmark) Caroline Wozniacki	42.2	91
5	(Spain) Anabel Medina Garrigues	41.5	59
6	(Russia) Maria Sharapova	41.4	40
7	(Belarus) Olga Govortsova	41.4	50
8	(Spain) Carla Suárez Navarro	41.1	74
9	(Italy) Sara Errani	40.7	52
10	(France) Alizé Cornet	40.7	44

Break points converted
	Player	%	Matches
1	(Belarus) Victoria Azarenka	53.3	60
2	(Czech Republic) Klára Zakopalová	52.9	25
3	(Russia) Anna Chakvetadze	52.4	31
4	(Poland) Agnieszka Radwańska	52.3	67
5	(Spain) Carla Suárez Navarro	52.1	54
6	(Russia) Dinara Safina	51.8	71
7	(Slovakia) Dominika Cibulková	51.7	36
8	(Ukraine) Kateryna Bondarenko	51.3	43
9	(Russia) Elena Dementieva	51.0	72
10	(Italy) Flavia Pennetta	50.4	75

Return games won
	Player	%	Matches
1	(Belarus) Victoria Azarenka	49.5	60
2	(Russia) Maria Sharapova	48.6	40
3	(Russia) Elena Dementieva	47.0	72
4	(Russia) Dinara Safina	46.5	71
5	(France) Marion Bartoli	45.8	68
6	(Denmark) Caroline Wozniacki	44.9	91
7	(Poland) Agnieszka Radwańska	43.8	67
8	(Italy) Flavia Pennetta	43.2	75
9	(Israel) Shahar Pe'er	42.9	57
10	(Italy) Sara Errani	42.8	52

== Points distribution ==
Category	W	F	SF	QF	R16	R32	R64	R128	Q	Q3	Q2	Q1
Grand Slam (S)	2000	1400	900	500	280	160	100	5	60	50	40	2
Grand Slam (D)	2000	1400	900	500	280	160	5	–	48	–	–	–
WTA Championships (S)	+450	+360	(230 for each win, 70 for each loss)					–	–	–	–	–
WTA Championships (D)	1500	1050	690	–	–	–	–	–	–	–	–	–
WTA Premier Mandatory (96S)	1000	700	450	250	140	80	50	5	30	–	20	1
WTA Premier Mandatory (64S)	1000	700	450	250	140	80	5	–	30	–	20	1
WTA Premier Mandatory (28/32D)	1000	700	450	250	140	5	–	–	–	–	–	–
WTA Premier 5 (56S)	800	550	350	200	110	60	1	–	30	–	20	1
WTA Premier 5 (28D)	800	550	350	200	110	1	–	–	–	–	–	–
WTA Premier (56S)	470	320	200	120	60	40	1	–	12	–	8	1
WTA Premier (32S)	470	320	200	120	60	1	–	–	20	12	8	1
WTA Premier (16D)	470	320	200	120	1	–	–	–	–	–	–	–
Tournament of Champions	+280	+170	(125 for each win, 35 for each loss)					–	–	–	–	–
WTA International (56S)	280	200	130	70	30	15	1	–	10	–	6	1
WTA International (32S)	280	200	130	70	30	1	–	–	16	10	6	1
WTA International (16D)	280	200	130	70	1	–	–	–	–	–	–	–

== Retirements ==
Following are notable players who announced their retirement from the Sony Ericsson WTA Tour during the 2009 season:

- (France) Nathalie Dechy The former world number 11 and 2006–2007 US Open doubles champion announced her retirement from professional tennis in July 2009.
- (Slovakia) Eva Fislová The former world number 98 announced her retirement in 2009.
- (United States) Jamea Jackson The former world number 45 announced her retirement from professional tennis in August 2009.
- (France) Émilie Loit The former world number 27 announced her retirement in 2009.
- (France) Amélie Mauresmo The former world number 1 2006 Australian Open and Wimbledon champion announced her retirement from professional tennis in December 2009.
- (Japan) Akiko Morigami The former world number 41 announced her retirement in 2009.
- (Israel) Tzipora Obziler The former world number 75 announced her retirement in 2009.
- (Argentina) María Emilia Salerni The former world number 65 announced her retirement in 2009.
- (Venezuela) Milagros Sequera The former world number 48 announced her retirement in 2009.
- (Australia) Bryanne Stewart The former doubles world number 16 announced her retirement in 2009.
- (Japan) Ai Sugiyama The former doubles world number 1 three Grand Slam women's doubles titles announced her retirement from professional tennis in October 2009.

== Awards ==
The winners of the 2009 WTA Awards were announced on 24 March 2010, during a special ceremony at the Sony Ericsson Open.

- Player of the Year – Serena Williams
- Doubles Team of the Year – Serena Williams & Venus Williams
- Most Improved Player – Yanina Wickmayer
- Comeback Player of the Year – Kim Clijsters
- Newcomer of the Year – Melanie Oudin
- Karen Krantzcke Sportsmanship Award – Kim Clijsters
- Player Service Award – Liezel Huber
- Fan Favorite Singles Player of the Year – Elena Dementieva
- Fan Favorite Doubles Team of the Year – Serena Williams & Venus Williams
- Favorite Premier Tournament – BNP Paribas Open (Indian Wells)
- Favorite International Tournament – Abierto Mexicano Telcel (Acapulco)

== See also ==
- 2009 ATP World Tour
- 2009 WTA Premier tournaments
- 2009 ITF Women's Circuit
- Women's Tennis Association
- International Tennis Federation
