= 2009 Internationaux de Strasbourg – Singles =

Singles
- 2009 Internationaux de Strasbourg

Final
- Champion: (France) Aravane Rezaï
- Runner-up: (Czech Republic) Lucie Hradecká
- Score: 7–6^{(7–2)}, 6–1

Details
- Draw: 32
- Seeds: 8

Events
Singles	Doubles
- Internationaux de Strasbourg

Anabel Medina Garrigues was the defending champion, but retired in the second round against Kristina Barrois.

Aravane Rezaï won the title, defeating Lucie Hradecká in the final 7–6^{(7–2)}, 6–1.

== Seeds ==
1. (Spain) Anabel Medina Garrigues (second round, retired due to a lower back injury)
2. (Austria) Sybille Bammer (first round)
3. (China) Peng Shuai (quarterfinals)
4. (Argentina) Gisela Dulko (second round)
5. (Thailand) Tamarine Tanasugarn (first round)
6. (Russia) Elena Vesnina (first round)
7. (Germany) Anna-Lena Grönefeld (first round)
8. (France) Nathalie Dechy (first round)

== Draw ==
Key

- Q = Qualifier
- WC = Wild card
- LL = Lucky loser
- Alt = Alternate
- ITF = ITF entry
- PR = Protected ranking
- SR = Special ranking
- SE = Special exempt
- JE = Junior exempt
- JR = Junior Accelerator Programme entrant
- CO = College Accelerator Programme entrant
- NG = Next Gen Accelerator Program entrant
- w/o = Walkover
- r = Retired
- d = Defaulted

=== Finals ===
Semifinals
(Czech Republic) Lucie Hradecká	6	1
(Japan) Ayumi Morita	0	0^{r}
Q	(Ukraine) Viktoriya Kutuzova	4	2
(France) Aravane Rezaï	6	6

Final
(Czech Republic) Lucie Hradecká	6^{2}	1
(France) Aravane Rezaï	7	6

=== Top half ===
First round
1	(Spain) A Medina Garrigues	1	6	6
(Belgium) Y Wickmayer	6	3	3
(Germany) K Barrois	6	6
WC	(France) I Pavlovic	3	3
(Czech Republic) L Hradecká	3	6	6
Q	(Germany) J Wöhr	6	1	2
(Russia) A Kudryavtseva	6	6^{5}	6
8	(France) N Dechy	0	7	3
3	(China) S Peng	3	6	6
(United States) A Glatch	6	2	0
(United States) V Lepchenko	6^{5}	6^{2}
(France) P Parmentier	7	7
WC	(France) K Laisné	1	3
(Japan) A Morita	6	6
(France) J Coin	6	6
6	(Russia) E Vesnina	4	2

Second round
1	(Spain) A Medina Garrigues	4	0^{r}
(Germany) K Barrois	6	0
(Czech Republic) L Hradecká	7	6
(Russia) A Kudryavtseva	5	0
3	(China) S Peng	6	7
(France) P Parmentier	3	6^{6}
(Japan) A Morita	4	6	6
(France) J Coin	6	0	4

Quarterfinals
(Germany) K Barrois	3	6^{2}
(Czech Republic) L Hradecká	6	7
3	(China) S Peng	5	2
(Japan) A Morita	7	6

Semifinals
(Czech Republic) L Hradecká	6	1
(Japan) A Morita	0	0^{r}

=== Bottom half ===
First round
5	(Thailand) T Tanasugarn	3	0
Q	(Ukraine) V Kutuzova	6	6
(France) S Foretz	6	2	6
(Belgium) K Flipkens	1	6	2
(France) M Johansson	6	4	1
(France) S Cohen-Aloro	4	6	6
(Italy) M Santangelo	1	6^{3}
4	(Argentina) G Dulko	6	7
7	(Germany) A-L Grönefeld	6	2	3
Q	(Romania) M Niculescu	4	6	6
Q	(Ukraine) Y Beygelzimer	0	7	6
WC	(France) C Feuerstein	6	6^{3}	3
(Estonia) M Ani	3	5
(Belarus) A Yakimova	6	7
(France) A Rezaï	6	6
2	(Austria) S Bammer	2	2

Second round
Q	(Ukraine) V Kutuzova	3	6	6
(France) S Foretz	6	3	2
(France) S Cohen-Aloro	4	7	6
4	(Argentina) G Dulko	6	6^{5}	4
Q	(Romania) M Niculescu	5	6	6
Q	(Ukraine) Y Beygelzimer	7	0	4
(Belarus) A Yakimova	4	1
(France) A Rezaï	6	6

Quarterfinals
Q	(Ukraine) V Kutuzova	7	6
(France) S Cohen-Aloro	5	1
Q	(Romania) M Niculescu	6	1	2
(France) A Rezaï	0	6	6

Semifinals
Q	(Ukraine) V Kutuzova	4	2
(France) A Rezaï	6	6
