= 2009 Internationaux de Strasbourg =

- Date: 18–23 May
- Edition: 23rd
- Category: WTA International
- Draw: 32S / 16D
- Prize money: $220,000
- Surface: Clay / outdoor
- Location: Strasbourg, France
- Venue: Centre Sportif de Hautepierre

Champions

Singles
- (France) Aravane Rezaï

Doubles
- (France) Nathalie Dechy / (Italy) Mara Santangelo
- Internationaux de Strasbourg

The 2009 Internationaux de Strasbourg was a women's tennis tournament played on outdoor clay courts. It was the 23rd edition of the Internationaux de Strasbourg, and was part of the International-level tournaments of the 2009 WTA Tour. It took place at the Centre Sportif de Hautepierre in Strasbourg, France, from 18 May until 23 May 2009. Aravane Rezaï won the singles title.

== Finals ==
=== Singles ===
(France) Aravane Rezaï defeated (Czech Republic) Lucie Hradecká, 7–6^{(7–2)}, 6–1

- It was Rezaï's first singles title of her career.

=== Doubles ===
(France) Nathalie Dechy / (Italy) Mara Santangelo defeated (France) Claire Feuerstein / (France) Stéphanie Foretz, 6–0, 6–1

== Entrants ==
=== Seeds ===
Player	Nationality	Ranking*	Seeding
Anabel Medina Garrigues	Spain	20	1
Sybille Bammer	Austria	29	2
Peng Shuai	China	32	3
Gisela Dulko	Argentina	43	4
Tamarine Tanasugarn	Thailand	48	5
Elena Vesnina	Russia	52	6
Anna-Lena Grönefeld	Germany	53	7
Nathalie Dechy	France	62	8

- Seedings are based on the rankings of May 11, 2009.

=== Other entrants ===
The following players received wildcards into the main draw:

- (France) Claire Feuerstein
- (France) Irena Pavlovic
- (France) Kinnie Laisné

The following players received entry from the qualifying draw:

- (Germany) Jasmin Wöhr
- (Ukraine) Viktoriya Kutuzova
- (Romania) Monica Niculescu
- (Ukraine) Yuliya Beygelzimer
