= 2009 Internationaux de Strasbourg – Doubles =

Doubles
- 2009 Internationaux de Strasbourg

Final
- Champions: (France) Nathalie Dechy; (Italy) Mara Santangelo
- Runners-up: (France) Claire Feuerstein; (France) Stéphanie Foretz
- Score: 6–0, 6–1

Details
- Draw: 16
- Seeds: 4

Events
| Singles | Doubles |
- Internationaux de Strasbourg

In the doubles event at the 2009 Internationaux de Strasbourg women's tennis tournament played in Strasbourg, France, the winning pair was Nathalie Dechy of France and Mara Santangelo of Italy.

== Seeds ==
1. (Chinese Taipei) Chuang Chia-jung / (Thailand) Tamarine Tanasugarn (first round)
2. (France) Nathalie Dechy / (Italy) Mara Santangelo (champions)
3. (Romania) Monica Niculescu / (Czech Republic) Vladimíra Uhlířová (first round)
4. (Czech Republic) Andrea Hlaváčková / (Czech Republic) Lucie Hradecká (semifinals)

== Draw ==
Key

- Q = Qualifier
- WC = Wild card
- LL = Lucky loser
- Alt = Alternate
- ITF = ITF entry
- PR = Protected ranking
- SR = Special ranking
- SE = Special exempt
- JE = Junior exempt
- JR = Junior Accelerator Programme entrant
- CO = College Accelerator Programme entrant
- NG = Next Gen Accelerator Program entrant
- w/o = Walkover
- r = Retired
- d = Defaulted

First round

Quarterfinals

Semifinals

Final

1
- (Chinese Taipei) C-j Chuang
- (Thailand) T Tanasugarn
4
6^{2}

- (Greece) E Daniilidou
- (Germany) J Wöhr
6
7

- (Greece) E Daniilidou
- (Germany) J Wöhr
6
4
[9]

- (United States) A Glatch
- (United States) V Lepchenko
4
6^{5}

- (France) C Feuerstein
- (France) S Foretz
3
6
[11]

- (France) C Feuerstein
- (France) S Foretz
6
7

- (France) C Feuerstein
- (France) S Foretz
6
6

4
- (Czech Republic) A Hlaváčková
- (Czech Republic) L Hradecká
6
6

4
- (Czech Republic) A Hlaváčková
- (Czech Republic) L Hradecká
4
4

- (Germany) K Barrois
- (Germany) A-L Grönefeld
3
4

4
- (Czech Republic) A Hlaváčková
- (Czech Republic) L Hradecká
6
6

- (Argentina) E Krauth
- (Sweden) H Nooni
7
7

- (Argentina) E Krauth
- (Sweden) H Nooni
2
2

WC
- (France) K Laisné
- (France) I Pavlovic
6^{8}
5

- (France) C Feuerstein
- (France) S Foretz
0
1

- (Russia) A Kudryavtseva
- (Ukraine) V Kutuzova
6^{6}
6
[4]

2
- (France) N Dechy
- (Italy) M Santangelo
6
6

- (South Africa) K Anderson
- (Luxembourg) C Schaul
7
2
[10]

- (South Africa) K Anderson
- (Luxembourg) C Schaul
2
0

- (Ukraine) Y Beygelzimer
- (China) T Sun
6
6

- (Ukraine) Y Beygelzimer
- (China) T Sun
6
6

3
- (Romania) M Niculescu
- (Czech Republic) V Uhlířová
4
4

- (Ukraine) Y Beygelzimer
- (China) T Sun
3
6^{2}

- (Argentina) ME Salerni
- (Belarus) A Yakimova
3
3

2
- (France) N Dechy
- (Italy) M Santangelo
6
7

- (Czech Republic) E Birnerová
- (Czech Republic) E Hrdinová
6
6

- (Czech Republic) E Birnerová
- (Czech Republic) E Hrdinová
4
6
[7]

- (France) J Coin
- (Canada) M-È Pelletier
2
2

2
- (France) N Dechy
- (Italy) M Santangelo
6
2
[10]

2
- (France) N Dechy
- (Italy) M Santangelo
6
6
