= 2009 WTA Premier tournaments =

The 2009 WTA Premier tournaments were 19 of the tennis tournaments on the 2009 WTA Tour. The WTA Tour is the elite tour for women's professional tennis. The WTA Premier tournaments all rank below the Grand Slam events and above the WTA International tournaments. They are divided into three levels: Premier Mandatory (Indian Wells, Miami, Madrid and Beijing), Premier 5 (Dubai, Roma, Cincinnati, Canada and Tokyo), and Premier (10 tournaments in Europe, United States and Australia).

== Schedule ==
=== Premier ===
Week of	Tournament	Champions	Runners-up	Semifinalists	Quarterfinalists
12 January	Medibank International Sydney; Sydney, Australia	(Russia) Elena Dementieva; 6–3, 2–6, 6–1	(Russia) Dinara Safina	(United States) Serena Williams (Japan) Ai Sugiyama	(Denmark) Caroline Wozniacki (Poland) Agnieszka Radwańska (Russia) Svetlana Kuznetsova (France) Alizé Cornet
12 January	Medibank International Sydney; Sydney, Australia	(Chinese Taipei) Hsieh Su-wei (China) Peng Shuai; 6–0, 6–1	(France) Nathalie Dechy (Australia) Casey Dellacqua	(United States) Serena Williams (Japan) Ai Sugiyama	(Denmark) Caroline Wozniacki (Poland) Agnieszka Radwańska (Russia) Svetlana Kuznetsova (France) Alizé Cornet
9 February	Open GDF Suez; Paris, France	(France) Amélie Mauresmo; 7–6(7), 2–6, 6–4	(Russia) Elena Dementieva	(United States) Serena Williams (Serbia) Jelena Janković	(France) Émilie Loit (France) Nathalie Dechy (Poland) Agnieszka Radwańska (France) Alizé Cornet
9 February	Open GDF Suez; Paris, France	(Zimbabwe) Cara Black (United States) Liezel Huber; 6–4, 3–6, [10–4]	(Czech Republic) Květa Peschke (United States) Lisa Raymond	(United States) Serena Williams (Serbia) Jelena Janković	(France) Émilie Loit (France) Nathalie Dechy (Poland) Agnieszka Radwańska (France) Alizé Cornet
13 April	Family Circle Cup; Charleston, USA	(Germany) Sabine Lisicki; 6–2, 6–4	(Denmark) Caroline Wozniacki	(Russia) Elena Dementieva (France) Marion Bartoli	(Slovakia) Dominika Cibulková (France) Virginie Razzano (Hungary) Melinda Czink (Russia) Elena Vesnina
13 April	Family Circle Cup; Charleston, USA	(United States) Bethanie Mattek-Sands (Russia) Nadia Petrova; 6–7(5), 6–2, [11–9]	(Latvia) Līga Dekmeijere (Switzerland) Patty Schnyder	(Russia) Elena Dementieva (France) Marion Bartoli	(Slovakia) Dominika Cibulková (France) Virginie Razzano (Hungary) Melinda Czink (Russia) Elena Vesnina
27 April	Porsche Tennis Grand Prix; Stuttgart, Germany	(Russia) Svetlana Kuznetsova; 6–4, 6–3	(Russia) Dinara Safina	(Italy) Flavia Pennetta (Russia) Elena Dementieva	(Poland) Agnieszka Radwańska (Serbia) Jelena Janković (Argentina) Gisela Dulko (France) Marion Bartoli
27 April	Porsche Tennis Grand Prix; Stuttgart, Germany	(United States) Bethanie Mattek-Sands (Russia) Nadia Petrova; 5–7, 6–3, [10–7]	(Argentina) Gisela Dulko (Italy) Flavia Pennetta	(Italy) Flavia Pennetta (Russia) Elena Dementieva	(Poland) Agnieszka Radwańska (Serbia) Jelena Janković (Argentina) Gisela Dulko (France) Marion Bartoli
18 May	Warsaw Open; Warsaw, Poland	(Romania) Alexandra Dulgheru; 7–6(3), 3–6, 6–0	(Ukraine) Alona Bondarenko	(United Kingdom) Anne Keothavong (Slovakia) Daniela Hantuchová	(Russia) Maria Sharapova (Romania) Ioana Raluca Olaru (Kazakhstan) Galina Voskoboeva (Czech Republic) Klára Zakopalová
18 May	Warsaw Open; Warsaw, Poland	(United States) Raquel Kops-Jones (United States) Bethanie Mattek-Sands; 6-1, 6–1	(China) Yan Zi (China) Zheng Jie	(United Kingdom) Anne Keothavong (Slovakia) Daniela Hantuchová	(Russia) Maria Sharapova (Romania) Ioana Raluca Olaru (Kazakhstan) Galina Voskoboeva (Czech Republic) Klára Zakopalová
15 June	Aegon International; Eastbourne, UK	(Denmark) Caroline Wozniacki; 7–6(5), 7–5	(France) Virginie Razzano	(France) Marion Bartoli (Canada) Aleksandra Wozniak	(Poland) Agnieszka Radwańska (Spain) Anabel Medina Garrigues (Russia) Ekaterina Makarova (Russia) Vera Dushevina
15 June	Aegon International; Eastbourne, UK	(Uzbekistan) Akgul Amanmuradova (Japan) Ai Sugiyama; 6–4, 6–3	(Australia) Samantha Stosur (Australia) Rennae Stubbs	(France) Marion Bartoli (Canada) Aleksandra Wozniak	(Poland) Agnieszka Radwańska (Spain) Anabel Medina Garrigues (Russia) Ekaterina Makarova (Russia) Vera Dushevina
27 July	Bank of the West Classic; Stanford, USA	(France) Marion Bartoli; 6–2, 5–7, 6–4	(United States) Venus Williams	(Australia) Samantha Stosur (Russia) Elena Dementieva	(United States) Serena Williams (Serbia) Jelena Janković (Slovakia) Daniela Hantuchová (Russia) Maria Sharapova
27 July	Bank of the West Classic; Stanford, USA	(United States) Serena Williams (United States) Venus Williams; 6–4, 6–1	(Chinese Taipei) Chan Yung-jan (Romania) Monica Niculescu	(Australia) Samantha Stosur (Russia) Elena Dementieva	(United States) Serena Williams (Serbia) Jelena Janković (Slovakia) Daniela Hantuchová (Russia) Maria Sharapova
3 August	LA Women's Tennis Championships p/b Herbalife; Los Angeles, USA	(Italy) Flavia Pennetta; 6–4, 6–3	(Australia) Samantha Stosur	(Romania) Sorana Cîrstea (Russia) Maria Sharapova	(China) Zheng Jie (Poland) Agnieszka Radwańska (Poland) Urszula Radwańska (Russia) Vera Zvonareva
3 August	LA Women's Tennis Championships p/b Herbalife; Los Angeles, USA	(Chinese Taipei) Chuang Chia-jung (China) Yan Zi; 6–0, 4–6, [10–7]	(Russia) Maria Kirilenko (Poland) Agnieszka Radwańska	(Romania) Sorana Cîrstea (Russia) Maria Sharapova	(China) Zheng Jie (Poland) Agnieszka Radwańska (Poland) Urszula Radwańska (Russia) Vera Zvonareva
24 August	Pilot Pen Tennis p/b Schick; New Haven, USA	(Denmark) Caroline Wozniacki; 6–2, 6–4	(Russia) Elena Vesnina	(France) Amélie Mauresmo (Italy) Flavia Pennetta	(Russia) Svetlana Kuznetsova (Russia) Anna Chakvetadze (Slovakia) Magdaléna Rybáriková (France) Virginie Razzano
24 August	Pilot Pen Tennis p/b Schick; New Haven, USA	(Spain) Nuria Llagostera Vives (Spain) María José Martínez Sánchez; 6–2, 7–5	(Czech Republic) Iveta Benešová (Czech Republic) Lucie Hradecká	(France) Amélie Mauresmo (Italy) Flavia Pennetta	(Russia) Svetlana Kuznetsova (Russia) Anna Chakvetadze (Slovakia) Magdaléna Rybáriková (France) Virginie Razzano
19 October	Kremlin Cup; Moscow, Russia	(Italy) Francesca Schiavone; 6-3, 6-0	(Belarus) Olga Govortsova	(Ukraine) Alona Bondarenko (Russia) Alisa Kleybanova	(Bulgaria) Tsvetana Pironkova (Russia) Maria Kirilenko (Russia) Vera Dushevina (Serbia) Jelena Janković
19 October	Kremlin Cup; Moscow, Russia	(Russia) Maria Kirilenko (Russia) Nadia Petrova; 6-2, 6-2	(Russia) Maria Kondratieva (Czech Republic) Klára Zakopalová	(Ukraine) Alona Bondarenko (Russia) Alisa Kleybanova	(Bulgaria) Tsvetana Pironkova (Russia) Maria Kirilenko (Russia) Vera Dushevina (Serbia) Jelena Janković
