= 2009 Fed Cup World Group =

Part of tennis tournament

- Date: 7 February – 8 November
- Edition: 19th

Champions
- Italy
- Fed Cup

The World Group was the highest level of Fed Cup competition in 2009. Eight nations competed in a three-round knockout competition. Russia was the two-time defending champion, but they were defeated by Italy in the semifinals. The Italian team went on to win, defeating the United States in the final, 4–0.

== Participating teams ==
Participating teams
Argentina	China	Czech Republic	France
Italy	Russia	Spain	United States

== Draw ==
Quarterfinals; 7–8 February
Moscow, Russia (Indoor hard)
1	Russia	5
China	0
Orléans, France (Indoor hard)
France	0
4	Italy	5
Surprise, AZ, United States (Outdoor hard)
3	United States	3
Argentina	2
Brno, Czech Republic (Indoor carpet)
Czech Republic	4
2	Spain	1

Semifinals; 25–26 April
Castellaneta, Italy (Outdoor clay)
1	Russia	1
4	Italy	4
Brno, Czech Republic (Indoor hard)
3	United States	3
Czech Republic	2

Final; 7–8 November
Reggio Calabria, Italy (Outdoor clay)
4	Italy	4
3	United States	0

== First round ==
=== Russia vs. China ===
Russia
5
Olympic Stadium, Moscow, Russia
7–8 February 2009
RuKortHard (indoors)

China
0

			1	2	3
1	(Russia) (China)	Svetlana Kuznetsova; Yan Zi	6; 2	6; 4
2	(Russia) (China)	Elena Dementieva; Zhang Shuai	6; 3	6; 0
3	(Russia) (China)	Anna Chakvetadze; Yan Zi	6; 1	6; 2
4	(Russia) (China)	Alisa Kleybanova; Sun Tiantian	6; 1	6; 1
5	(Russia) (China)	Elena Dementieva / Svetlana Kuznetsova; Sun Tiantian / Yan Zi	1; 6	6; 4	6; 4

=== France vs. Italy ===
France
0
Palais des Sports, Orléans, France
7–8 February 2009
Resin hard (indoors)

Italy
5

			1	2	3
1	(France) (Italy)	Amélie Mauresmo; Flavia Pennetta	6; 2	6^{7} 7^{9}	4; 6
2	(France) (Italy)	Alizé Cornet; Francesca Schiavone	1; 6	6; 2	6; 8
3	(France) (Italy)	Alizé Cornet; Flavia Pennetta	2; 6	2; 6
4	(France) (Italy)	Amélie Mauresmo; Sara Errani	3; 6	4; 6
5	(France) (Italy)	Séverine Brémond / Nathalie Dechy; Sara Errani / Roberta Vinci	4; 6	4; 6

=== United States vs. Argentina ===
United States
3
Surprise Tennis and Racquet Complex, Surprise, AZ, United States
7–8 February 2009
Decoturf (outdoors)

Argentina
2

			1	2	3
1	(United States) (Argentina)	Jill Craybas; Betina Jozami	6; 2	6; 1
2	(United States) (Argentina)	Melanie Oudin; Gisela Dulko	2; 6	5; 7
3	(United States) (Argentina)	Jill Craybas; Gisela Dulko	1; 6	3; 6
4	(United States) (Argentina)	Melanie Oudin; Betina Jozami	2; 6	6; 1	6; 2
5	(United States) (Argentina)	Julie Ditty / Liezel Huber; Gisela Dulko / Betina Jozami	6; 2	6; 3

=== Czech Republic vs. Spain ===
Czech Republic
4
Brno Exhibition Centre, Brno, Czech Republic
7–8 February 2009
Carpet (indoors)

Spain
1

			1	2	3
1	(Czech Republic) (Spain)	Petra Kvitová; Carla Suárez Navarro	6; 4	6; 4
2	(Czech Republic) (Spain)	Iveta Benešová; Nuria Llagostera Vives	6; 1	1; 6	4; 6
3	(Czech Republic) (Spain)	Lucie Šafářová; Carla Suárez Navarro	6; 4	6; 3
4	(Czech Republic) (Spain)	Petra Kvitová; Nuria Llagostera Vives	6; 4	7; 5
5	(Czech Republic) (Spain)	Iveta Benešová / Květa Peschke; Lourdes Domínguez Lino / María José Martínez Sánchez	6; 4	6; 2

== Semifinals ==
=== Russia vs. Italy ===
Russia
1
Nova Yardinia, Castellaneta Marina, Italy
25–26 April 2009
Red clay (outdoors)

Italy
4

			1	2	3
1	(Russia) (Italy)	Anna Chakvetadze; Flavia Pennetta	4; 6	0; 6
2	(Russia) (Italy)	Svetlana Kuznetsova; Francesca Schiavone	6; 1	2; 6	3; 6
3	(Russia) (Italy)	Svetlana Kuznetsova; Flavia Pennetta	6; 0	6; 3
4	(Russia) (Italy)	Anastasia Pavlyuchenkova; Francesca Schiavone	6; 7	6; 4	2; 6
5	(Russia) (Italy)	Anastasia Pavlyuchenkova / Nadia Petrova; Sara Errani / Roberta Vinci	6; 1	3; 6	4; 6

=== United States vs. Czech Republic ===
United States
3
Starobrno Rondo Arena, Brno, Czech Republic
25–26 April 2009
Acrylic hard (indoors)

Czech Republic
2

			1	2	3
1	(United States) (Czech Republic)	Bethanie Mattek-Sands; Petra Kvitová	3; 6	6^{2} 7^{7}
2	(United States) (Czech Republic)	Alexa Glatch; Iveta Benešová	6; 1	6; 2
3	(United States) (Czech Republic)	Bethanie Mattek-Sands; Lucie Šafářová	3; 6	1; 6
4	(United States) (Czech Republic)	Alexa Glatch; Petra Kvitová	6; 2	6; 1
5	(United States) (Czech Republic)	Liezel Huber / Bethanie Mattek-Sands; Iveta Benešová / Květa Peschke	2; 6	7^{7} 6^{2}	6; 1

== Final ==
=== Italy vs. United States ===
Italy
4
Circolo del Tennis, Reggio Calabria, Italy
7–8 November 2009
Red clay (outdoors)

United States
0

			1	2	3
1	(Italy) (United States)	Flavia Pennetta; Alexa Glatch	6; 3	6; 1
2	(Italy) (United States)	Francesca Schiavone; Melanie Oudin	7^{7} 6^{2}	6; 2
3	(Italy) (United States)	Flavia Pennetta; Melanie Oudin	7; 5	6; 2
4	(Italy) (United States)	Francesca Schiavone; Alexa Glatch				not played
5	(Italy) (United States)	Sara Errani / Roberta Vinci; Liezel Huber / Vania King	4; 6	6; 3	11; 9

2009 Fed Cup champions

Italy
Second title

== See also ==
- Fed Cup structure
