= Claire Feuerstein =

French tennis player

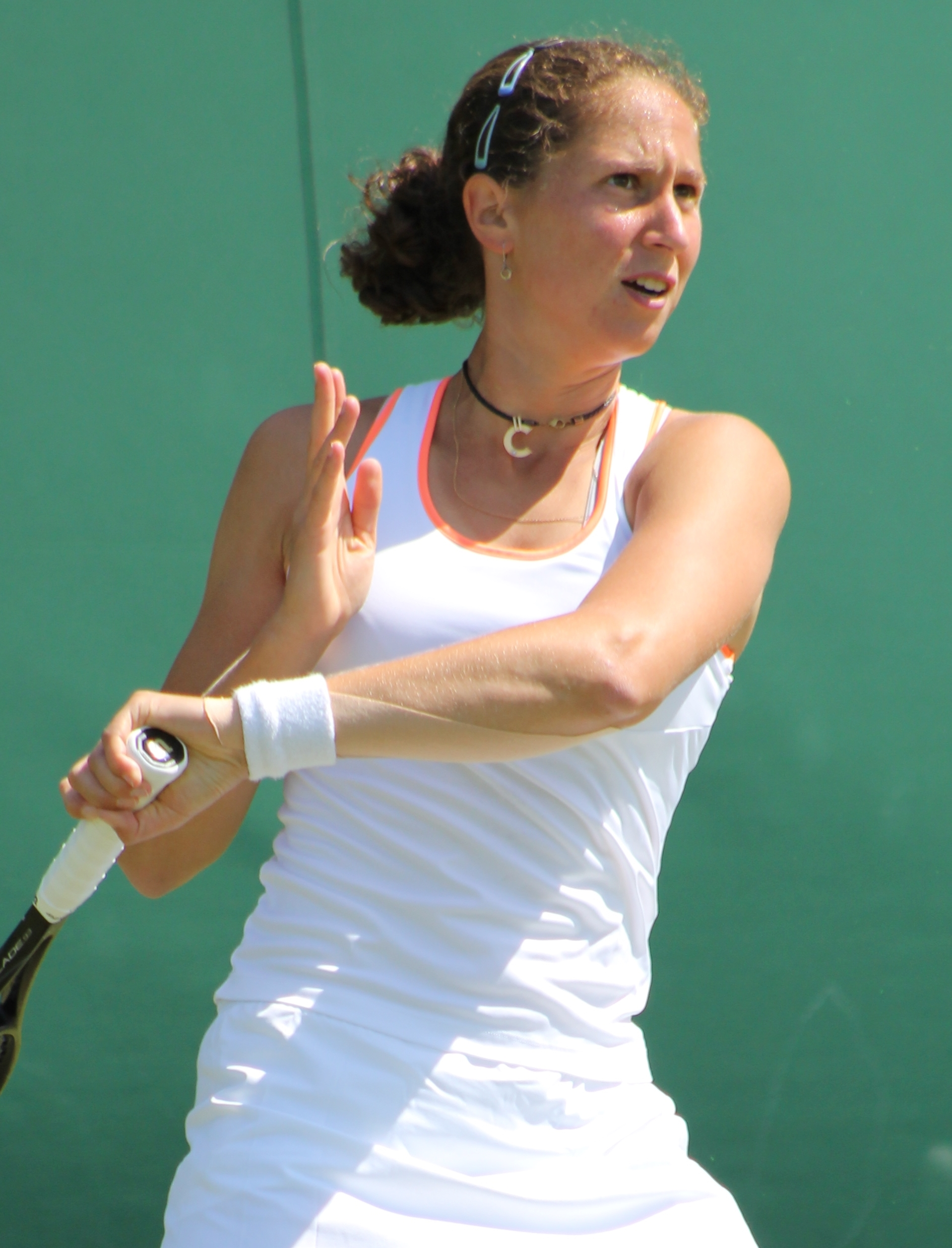
- Claire Feuerstein, 2014
- Country (sports): France
- Residence: Grenoble, France
- Born: 28 February 1986 (age 39); Grenoble, France
- Height: 1.78 m (5 ft 10 in)
- Turned pro: 2005
- Plays: Left-handed (one-handed backhand)
- Prize money: $520,602

Singles
- Career record: 346–272
- Career titles: 11 ITF
- Highest ranking: No. 110 (18 August 2014)

Grand Slam singles results
- Australian Open: Q3 (2014)
- French Open: 2R (2012, 2014)
- Wimbledon: Q3 (2012)
- US Open: Q2 (2011, 2013)

Doubles
- Career record: 59–69
- Career titles: 2 ITF
- Highest ranking: No. 136 (17 May 2010)

Grand Slam doubles results
- French Open: 1R (2010, 2011, 2012, 2014)

Claire Feuerstein (French pronunciation: [klɛʁ]; German: [ˈfɔʏ̯ɐˌʃtaɪ̯n]; born 28 February 1986) is a former tennis player from France.

She made her debut in professional competition in 2002, aged 16, at an ITF tournament in Les Contamines, France.

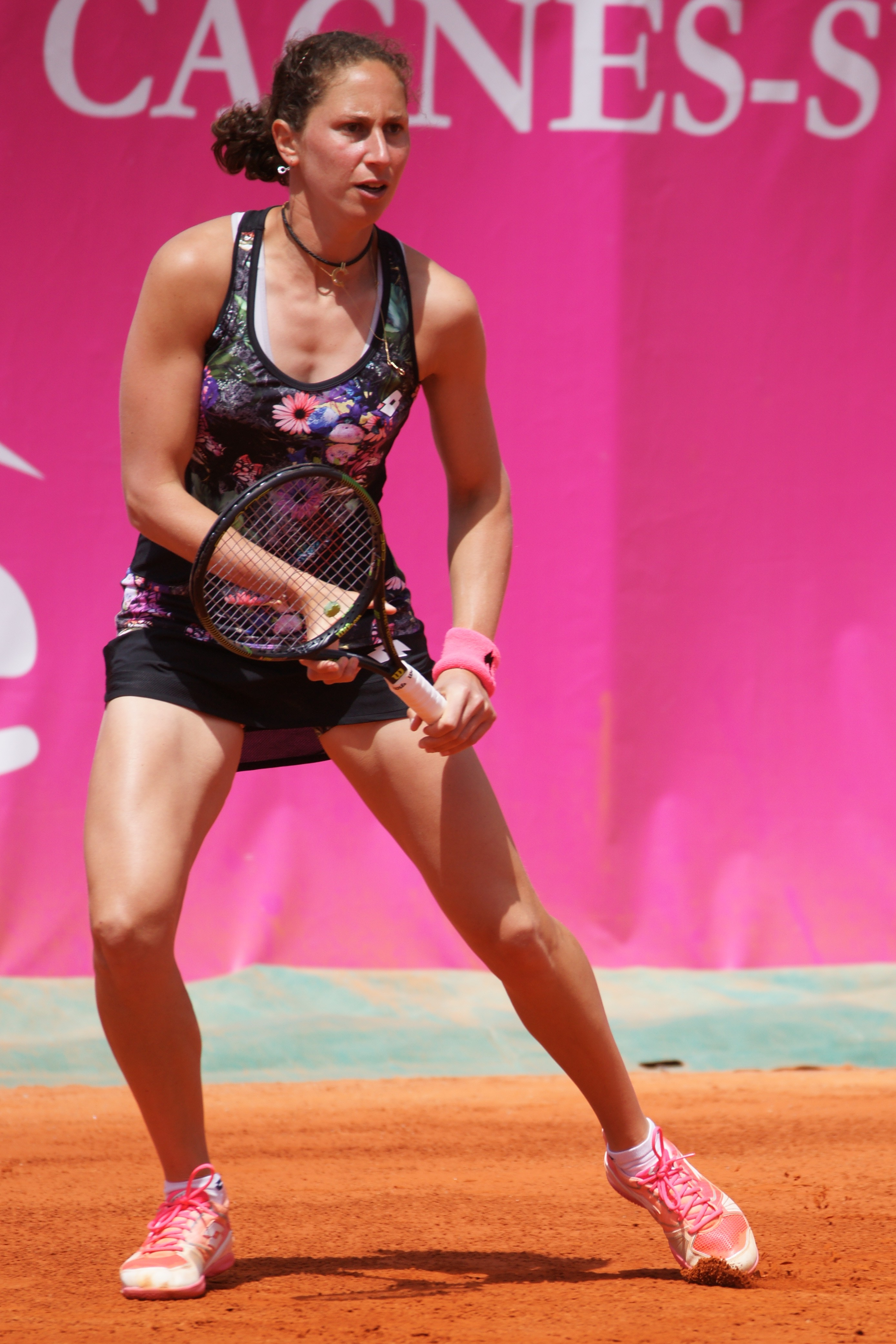
Claire Feuerstein at 2016 Cagnes-sur-Mer

From 2002 to 2009, she played at many ITF tournaments, with three wins. Her first appearance in a WTA Tour event was at the 2009 Internationaux de Strasbourg, where she lost in the first round of the singles competition, but reached the final in doubles with partner Stéphanie Foretz.

She received a wildcard entry into the main draw of the 2009 French Open and lost to No. 7 seed, Svetlana Kuznetsova, in the first round.

== WTA career finals ==
=== Doubles: 1 (runner-up) ===
Legend
Grand Slam tournaments
Premier M & Premier 5
Premier
International (0–1)

Result	Date	Tournament	Surface	Partner	Opponents	Score
Loss	May 2009	Strasbourg, France	Clay	(France) Stéphanie Foretz	(France) Nathalie Dechy (Italy) Mara Santangelo	0–6, 1–6

== ITF Circuit finals ==
=== Singles: 19 (11–8) ===
Legend $100,000 tournaments $75,000 tournaments $50,000 tournaments $25,000 tournaments $10,000 tournaments	Finals by surface Hard (9–7) Clay (2–1) Grass (0–0) Carpet (0–0)

Result	No.	Date	Tournament	Surface	Opponent	Score
Win	1.	Apr 2007	GB Pro-Series Bath, United Kingdom	Hard (i)	(Czech Republic) Kateřina Vaňková	6–3, 6–3
Win	2.	Apr 2007	ITF Torhout, Belgium	Hard	(Belgium) Yanina Wickmayer	6–4, 6–4
Win	3.	Jan 2008	ITF Grenoble, France	Hard (i)	(France) Anne-Laure Heitz	6–3, 4–6, 6–4
Loss	1.	Mar 2009	ITF Lyon, France	Hard	(China) Zhang Shuai	6–1, 1–6, 3–6
Loss	2.	Mar 2009	ITF Jersey, United Kingdom	Hard (i)	(United Kingdom) Katie O'Brien	5–7, 0–1 ret.
Win	4.	Oct 2009	Open de Limoges, France	Clay (i)	(France) Anaïs Laurendon	6–0, 5–7, 6–3
Win	5.	Dec 2009	ITF Přerov, Czech Republic	Hard (i)	(Russia) Ksenia Lykina	6–7^{(5)}, 6–3, 6–4
Loss	3.	Nov 2010	ITF Přerov, Czech Republic	Hard (i)	(Czech Republic) Renata Voráčová	6–4, 3–6, 5–7
Loss	4.	Feb 2011	ITF Lyon, France	Hard (i)	(Italy) Anna Remondina	6–7^{(6)}, 3–6
Loss	5.	Mar 2011	ITF Dijon, France	Hard (i)	(Belgium) Alison Van Uytvanck	2–6, 3–6
Win	6.	Jul 2011	ITF Les Contamines, France	Hard	(France) Anaïs Laurendon	7–6^{(4)}, 2–6, 7–6^{(2)}
Win	7.	Oct 2011	GB Pro-Series Glasgow, UK	Hard (i)	(Austria) Yvonne Meusburger	6–3, 6–1
Loss	6.	Feb 2012	ITF Surprise, United States	Hard	(Portugal) Michelle Larcher de Brito	1–6, 3–6
Loss	7.	Apr 2012	ITF Phuket, Thailand	Hard	(Russia) Marta Sirotkina	5–7, 6–7^{(6)}
Loss	8.	May 2012	Open Saint-Gaudens, France	Clay	(Colombia) Mariana Duque	6–4, 3–6, 2–6
Win	8.	Oct 2012	Open de Limoges, France	Hard (i)	(Ukraine) Maryna Zanevska	7–5, 6–3
Win	9.	Sep 2013	ITF Mestre, Italy	Clay	(Slovenia) Nastja Kolar	6–1, 7–6^{(2)}
Win	10.	Mar 2014	ITF Croissy-Beaubourg, France	Hard (i)	(Czech Republic) Renata Voráčová	6–3, 4–6, 6–4
Win	11.	Mar 2016	ITF Mâcon, France	Hard (i)	(Serbia) Vesna Dolonc	6–2, 4–6, 6–4

=== Doubles: 10 (2–8) ===
Legend $100,000 tournaments $75,000 tournaments $50,000 tournaments $25,000 tournaments $10,000 tournaments	Finals by surface Hard (1–5) Clay (1–3) Grass (0–0) Carpet (0–0)

Result	No.	Date	Tournament	Surface	Partner	Opponents	Score
Loss	1.	22 September 2009	ITF Madrid, Spain	Hard	(France) Constance Sibille	(Russia) Nina Bratchikova (France) Irena Pavlovic	2–6, 4–6
Win	1.	19 October 2009	ITF Saint-Raphaël, France	Hard (i)	(France) Stéphanie Foretz	(Georgia (country)) Margalita Chakhnashvili (Spain) Sílvia Soler Espinosa	7–6^{(4)}, 7–5
Win	2.	10 May 2010	Open Saint-Gaudens, France	Clay	(France) Stéphanie Foretz	(Ukraine) Olga Savchuk (Belarus) Anastasiya Yakimova	6–2, 6–4
Loss	2.	20 July 2010	Les Contamines-Montjoie, France	Hard	(France) Constance Sibille	(Italy) Giulia Gatto-Monticone (Italy) Federica Quercia	5–7, 5–7
Loss	3.	25 September 2010	ITF Shrewsbury, UK	Hard (i)	(Serbia) Vesna Dolonc	(Russia) Vitalia Diatchenko (France) Irena Pavlovic	4–6, 6–4, [6–10]
Loss	4.	10 August 2010	Open de Limoges, France	Clay	(France) Caroline Garcia	(Ukraine) Lyudmyla Kichenok (Ukraine) Nadiia Kichenok	7–6^{(5)}, 4–6, [8–10]
Loss	5.	15 November 2010	ITF Bratislava, Slovakia	Hard (i)	(Russia) Valeria Savinykh	(France) Irena Pavlovic (Finland) Emma Laine	4–6, 4–6
Loss	6.	12 September 2010	ITF Stockholm, Sweden	Hard (i)	(Russia) Ksenia Lykina	(Netherlands) Arantxa Rus (Belarus) Anastasiya Yakimova	3–6, 6–2, 4–6
Loss	7.	25 April 2011	Chiasso Open, Switzerland	Clay	(France) Anaïs Laurendon	(Austria) Yvonne Meusburger (Germany) Kathrin Wörle-Scheller	3–6, 3–6
Loss	8.	1 July 2013	Reinert Open, Germany	Clay	(Czech Republic) Renata Voráčová	(Georgia (country)) Sofia Shapatava (Georgia (country)) Anna Tatishvili	4–6, 4–6
