= 2009 US Open Series =

In tennis, the sixth edition of the US Open Series (known as Olympus US Open Series for sponsorship reasons), included ten hard court tournaments started on July 20 in Indianapolis and ended in New Haven, Connecticut on August 29. This edition has scheduled five separate men's tournaments, four women's tournaments, and the Pilot Pen Tennis Tournament hosted both a men's and women's event. The series included two ATP World Tour Masters 1000 and two WTA Premier 5 events to headline the series.

== Point distribution for series events ==
To be included in the standings and subsequently the bonus prize money, a player had to have countable results from two different tournaments. Players finishing in the top three in the series can earn up to $1 million in extra prize money at the US Open. Roger Federer received the largest US Open pay day of $2.4 million in 2007 after capturing the title in both the US Open Series and the US Open championship.

Round	ATP Masters Series 1000 WTA Premier 5 Series	ATP World Tour 500/250 WTA Premier Series
Champion	100	70
Finalist	70	45
Semifinalist	45	25
Quarterfinalist	25	15
Round of 16	15	0

== US Open Series standings ==
=== ATP ===
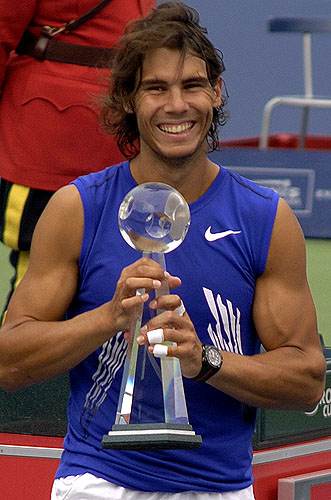
Rafael Nadal's championship run in Toronto and his semifinal finish at Cincinnati to win the 2008 US Open Series

Olympus US Open Series standings as of August 30, 2009.

Rank	Nation	Player	Tours ^{1}	Titles	Points
1	USA	Sam Querrey	4	1	175
2	GBR	Andy Murray	2	1	145
3	ARG	Juan Martín del Potro	2	1	140
4	SUI	Roger Federer	2	1	125
5	SRB	Novak Djokovic	2	-	95
6	USA	Andy Roddick	2	-	90
7	ESP	Fernando Verdasco	2	1	85
8	ESP	Rafael Nadal	2	-	70
9	USA	John Isner	3	-	65
10	RUS	Nikolay Davydenko	2	-	55
11-T	CZE	Tomas Berdych	2	-	40
11-T	CHI	Fernando Gonzalez	2	-	40
11-T	GER	Tommy Haas	2	-	40
11-T	ARG	Leonardo Mayer	2	-	40
11-T	FRA	Gilles Simon	2	-	40

==== Notes ====
- 1 - Tours - Number of tournaments in US Open Series in which a player has reached the quarterfinals or better, in 250 and 500 series events or the Round of 16 in ATP World Tour Masters 1000 events

=== WTA ===
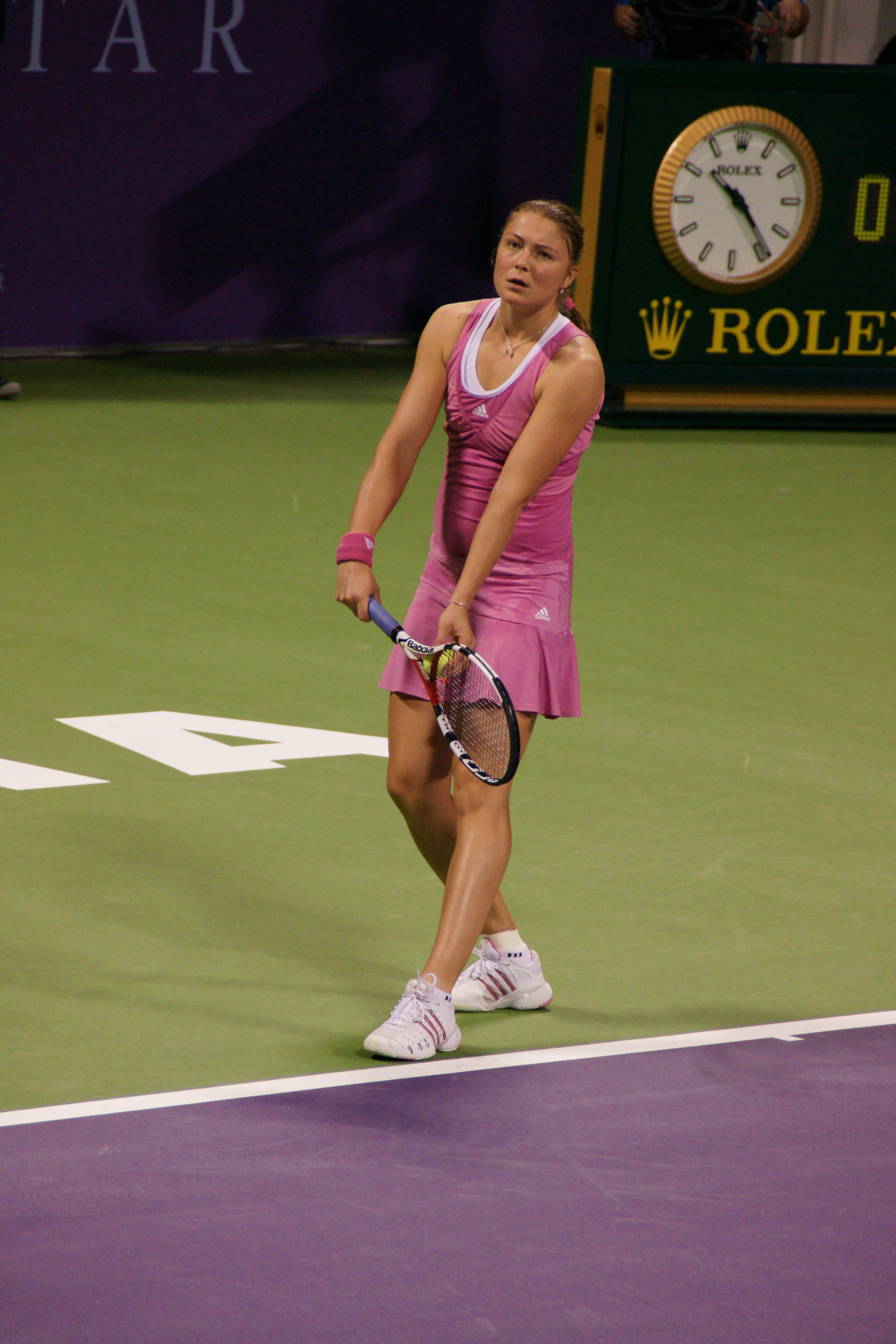
With the capture of the Los Angeles and Montreal championships, Dinara Safina secured the 2008 US Open Series crown

Olympus US Open Series standings as of August 24, 2009.

Rank	Nation	Player	Tours	Titles	Points
1	RUS	Elena Dementieva	3	1	170
2	ITA	Flavia Pennetta	3	1	140^{2}
3	SRB	Jelena Janković	3	1	140
4	RUS	Maria Sharapova	3	-	110
5-T	AUS	Samantha Stosur	3	-	95
5-T	DEN	Caroline Wozniacki	2	1	95
7	USA	Serena Williams	3	-	75
8	USA	Venus Williams	2	-	60
9	RUS	Vera Zvonareva	3	-	45
10-T	ROU	Sorana Cîrstea	2	-	40
10-T	SVK	Daniela Hantuchová	2	-	40
10-T	BEL	Kim Clijsters	2	-	40
10-T	POL	Agnieszka Radwańska	2	-	40
14-T	CHN	Jie Zheng	2	-	30
14-T	RUS	Svetlana Kuznetsova	2	-	30
14-T	FRA	Virginie Razzano	2	-	30

==== Notes ====
- 1 - Tours - Number of tournaments in US Open Series in which a player has reached the quarterfinals or better, in Premier events; or the Round of 16 or better in Premier 5 events
- 2 - Pennetta finished second in the final standings based on more match wins in US Open Series Events.

== 2009 schedule ==
Legend
Grand Slam Event
ATP Masters 1000 and WTA Premier 5
ATP World Tour 500 and WTA Premier
ATP World Tour 250

Week	Date	Men's Events	Women's Events
1	July 20–26	Indianapolis; Indianapolis Tennis Championships; 2009 Champion: (United States) Robby Ginepri	No Series Event Held This Week
2	July 27 - Aug 2	Los Angeles; LA Tennis Open presented by Farmers Insurance; 2009 Champion: (United States) Sam Querrey	Stanford; Bank of the West Classic; 2009 Champion: (France) Marion Bartoli
3	Aug 3-9	Washington, D.C. Legg Mason Tennis Classic Presented by Geico; 2009 Champion: (Argentina) Juan Martín del Potro	Los Angeles; LA Women's Tennis Championships presented by Herbalife; 2009 Champion: (Italy) Flavia Pennetta
4	Aug 10-16	Montreal; Rogers Masters Presented by National Bank; 2009 Champion: (United Kingdom) Andy Murray	Cincinnati; Western & Southern Financial Group Women's Open; 2009 Champion: (Serbia) Jelena Janković
5	Aug 17-23	Cincinnati; Western & Southern Financial Group Masters; 2009 Champion: (Switzerland) Roger Federer	Toronto; Rogers Cup; 2009 Champion: (Russia) Elena Dementieva
6	Aug 23-29	New Haven; Pilot Pen Tennis Presented by Schick; 2009 Champion: (Spain) Fernando Verdasco	New Haven; Pilot Pen Tennis Presented by Schick; 2009 Champion: (Denmark) Caroline Wozniacki
7-8	Aug 31 - Sep 14	New York; US Open; 2009 Champion: (Argentina) Juan Martín del Potro	New York; US Open; 2009 Champion: (Belgium) Kim Clijsters

== Week 1 ==
=== ATP - Indianapolis Tennis Championships ===
Andy Roddick was scheduled to receive the number one seeding in this event, but pulled out due to a right hip flexor injury before the main draw was held. Instead 24th ranked Dmitry Tursunov, headlined the event. In the second round Sam Querrey avenged his final round loss at Newport with a straight sets win over fellow American Rajeev Ram. Canadian Frank Dancevic upset number one seeded Dmitry Tursunov to reach the semifinals where he was ousted by Sam Querrey in the semifinal in straight sets. Robby Ginepri neutralized the fast-serving 6'10" American John Isner to set up an All-American final on championship Sunday.

==== Main Draw Finals ====
Quarterfinals
1	(Russia) Dmitry Tursunov	6	6^{5}	3
(Canada) Frank Dancevic	3	7	6
3	(United States) Sam Querrey	6	7
7	(France) Marc Gicquel	4	5
(United States) John Isner	7	6^{2}	7
(United States) Wayne Odesnik	5	7	5
(United States) Robby Ginepri	7	6
Q	(United States) Alex Bogomolov, Jr.	5	1

Semifinals
(Canada) Frank Dancevic	4	4
3	(United States) Sam Querrey	6	6
(United States) John Isner	4	3
(United States) Robby Ginepri	6	6

Final
3	(United States) Sam Querrey	3	4
(United States) Robby Ginepri	6	6

== Week 2 ==
=== ATP - LA Tennis Open ===
On the day one all seeded players advanced, save Lu Yen-Hsun who lost in straight sets to Latvian Ernests Gulbis. After winning the first US Open Series title of the season, Robby Ginepri lost to former world No.1 Marat Safin in three sets. Indianapolis semifinalist John Isner and finalist Sam Querrey advanced to the second round after defeating Benjamin Becker and Denis Istomin, respectively.

==== Main Draw Finals ====
Quarterfinals
1	(Germany) Tommy Haas	7	6
8	(Russia) Marat Safin	6^{3}	2
4	(Israel) Dudi Sela	3	5
6	(United States) Sam Querrey	6	7
(United States) John Isner	4	4
Q	(Australia) Carsten Ball	6	6
(Argentina) Leonardo Mayer	w/o
2	(United States) Mardy Fish

Semifinals
1	(Germany) Tommy Haas	3	5
6	(United States) Sam Querrey	6	7
Q	(Australia) Carsten Ball	7	7
(Argentina) Leonardo Mayer	5	6^{3}

Final
6	(United States) Sam Querrey	6	3	6
Q	(Australia) Carsten Ball	4	6	1

=== WTA - Bank of the West Classic ===
==== Main Draw Finals ====
Quarterfinals
1	(United States) Serena Williams	2	6	2
(Australia) Samantha Stosur	6	3	6
4	(Serbia) Jelena Janković	6	6^{3}	3
8	(France) Marion Bartoli	3	7	6
(Slovakia) Daniela Hantuchová	2	4
3	(Russia) Elena Dementieva	6	6
(Russia) Maria Sharapova	2	2
2	(United States) Venus Williams	6	6

Semifinals
(Australia) Samantha Stosur	3	6	1
8	(France) Marion Bartoli	6	1	6
3	(Russia) Elena Dementieva	0	1
2	(United States) Venus Williams	6	6

Final
8	(France) Marion Bartoli	6	5	6
2	(United States) Venus Williams	2	7	4

== Week 3 ==
=== ATP - Legg Mason Tennis Classic ===
==== Main Draw Finals ====
Quarterfinals
1	(United States) Andy Roddick	7	7
11	(Croatia) Ivo Karlović	6^{4}	6^{5}
(United States) John Isner	6	6^{10}	6
8	(Czech Republic) Tomáš Berdych	3	7	2
10	(Germany) Tommy Haas	5	4
4	(Chile) Fernando González	7	6
5	(Sweden) Robin Söderling
2	(Argentina) Juan Martín del Potro	w/o

Semifinals
1	(United States) Andy Roddick	6^{3}	6	7
(United States) John Isner	7	2	5
4	(Chile) Fernando González	6^{2}	3
2	(Argentina) Juan Martín del Potro	7	6

Final
1	(United States) Andy Roddick	6	5	6^{6}
2	(Argentina) Juan Martín del Potro	3	7	7

=== WTA - LA Women's Tennis Championships ===
==== Main Draw Finals ====
Quarterfinals
14	(China) Zheng Jie	6	3	4
13	(Australia) Samantha Stosur	4	6	6
(Romania) Sorana Cîrstea	7	1	7
8	(Poland) Agnieszka Radwańska	6^{4}	6	5
(Poland) Urszula Radwańska	4	5
(Russia) Maria Sharapova	6	7
10	(Italy) Flavia Pennetta	6	6
2	(Russia) Vera Zvonareva	4	2

Semifinals
13	(Australia) Samantha Stosur	6	6
(Romania) Sorana Cîrstea	3	2
(Russia) Maria Sharapova	2	6	3
10	(Italy) Flavia Pennetta	6	4	6

Final
13	(Australia) Samantha Stosur	4	3
10	(Italy) Flavia Pennetta	6	6

== Week 4 ==
=== ATP - Rogers Masters ===
==== Main Draw Finals ====
Round of 16
1	(Switzerland) Roger Federer	6	7
(Switzerland) Stanislas Wawrinka	3	6^{5}
9	(France) Gilles Simon	3	3
7	(France) Jo-Wilfried Tsonga	6	6
3	(United Kingdom) Andy Murray	6	6
Q	(Spain) Juan Carlos Ferrero	1	3
11	(Chile) Fernando González	6^{2}	5
8	(Russia) Nikolay Davydenko	7	7
5	(United States) Andy Roddick	7	4	7
10	(Spain) Fernando Verdasco	6^{2}	6	6^{5}
(Russia) Mikhail Youzhny	3	4
4	(Serbia) Novak Djokovic	6	6
6	(Argentina) Juan Martín del Potro	3	6	6
(Romania) Victor Hănescu	6	3	4
(Germany) Philipp Petzschner	3	2
2	(Spain) Rafael Nadal	6	6

Quarterfinals
1	(Switzerland) Roger Federer	6^{5}	6	6^{3}
7	(France) Jo-Wilfried Tsonga	7	1	7
3	(United Kingdom) Andy Murray	6	6
8	(Russia) Nikolay Davydenko	2	4
5	(United States) Andy Roddick	6	7
4	(Serbia) Novak Djokovic	4	6^{4}
6	(Argentina) Juan Martín del Potro	7	6
2	(Spain) Rafael Nadal	6^{5}	1

Semifinals
7	(France) Jo-Wilfried Tsonga	4	6^{8}
3	(United Kingdom) Andy Murray	6	7
5	(United States) Andy Roddick	6	2	5
6	(Argentina) Juan Martín del Potro	4	6	7

Final
3	(United Kingdom) Andy Murray	6^{4}	7	6
6	(Argentina) Juan Martín del Potro	7	6^{3}	1

=== WTA - Western & Southern Financial Group Women's Open ===
==== Main Draw Finals ====
Round of 16
1	(Russia) Dinara Safina	6	6
(China) Peng Shuai	3	4
WC	(Belgium) Kim Clijsters	6	4	6
6	(Russia) Svetlana Kuznetsova	4	6	2
3	(United States) Venus Williams	6^{2}	4
14	(Italy) Flavia Pennetta	7	6
(Slovakia) Daniela Hantuchová	7	0	7
7	(Russia) Vera Zvonareva	6^{6}	6	6^{5}
8	(Denmark) Caroline Wozniacki	3
(Hungary) Melinda Czink	0	r
(Romania) Sorana Cîrstea	4	4
4	(Russia) Elena Dementieva	6	6
5	(Serbia) Jelena Janković	7	7
9	(Belarus) Victoria Azarenka	5	6^{4}
(Austria) Sybille Bammer	7	6
2	(United States) Serena Williams	5	4

Quarterfinals
1	(Russia) Dinara Safina	6	7
WC	(Belgium) Kim Clijsters	2	5
14	(Italy) Flavia Pennetta	6	6
(Slovakia) Daniela Hantuchová	3	3
8	(Denmark) Caroline Wozniacki	2	1
4	(Russia) Elena Dementieva	6	6
5	(Serbia) Jelena Janković	6	6
(Austria) Sybille Bammer	0	3

Semifinals
1	(Russia) Dinara Safina	6	6
14	(Italy) Flavia Pennetta	2	0
4	(Russia) Elena Dementieva	6^{2}	6	6^{6}
5	(Serbia) Jelena Janković	7	0	7

Final
1	(Russia) Dinara Safina	4	2
5	(Serbia) Jelena Janković	6	6

== Week 5 ==
=== ATP - Western & Southern Financial Group Masters ===
==== Main Draw Finals ====
Round of 16
1	(Switzerland) Roger Federer	3	6	6
(Spain) David Ferrer	6	3	4
(Australia) Lleyton Hewitt	6	2	6
(United States) Sam Querrey	1	6	3
3	(United Kingdom) Andy Murray	6	6
16	(Czech Republic) Radek Štěpánek	4	1
(Spain) Guillermo García-López	6	4	6^{4}
LL	(France) Julien Benneteau	4	6	7
8	(Russia) Nikolay Davydenko	7	4	4
9	(France) Gilles Simon	6^{6}	6	6
(France) Jérémy Chardy	5	3
4	(Serbia) Novak Djokovic	7	6
Q	(Australia) Chris Guccione	4	3
(Czech Republic) Tomáš Berdych	6	6
(France) Paul-Henri Mathieu	5	2
2	(Spain) Rafael Nadal	7	6

Quarterfinals
1	(Switzerland) Roger Federer	6	6
(Australia) Lleyton Hewitt	3	4
3	(United Kingdom) Andy Murray	4	6	6
LL	(France) Julien Benneteau	6	3	1
9	(France) Gilles Simon	4	5
4	(Serbia) Novak Djokovic	6	7
(Czech Republic) Tomáš Berdych	4	5
2	(Spain) Rafael Nadal	6	7

Semifinals
1	(Switzerland) Roger Federer	6	7
3	(United Kingdom) Andy Murray	2	6^{8}
4	(Serbia) Novak Djokovic	6	6
2	(Spain) Rafael Nadal	1	4

Final
1	(Switzerland) Roger Federer	6	7
4	(Serbia) Novak Djokovic	1	5

=== WTA - Rogers Cup ===
==== Main Draw Finals ====
Round of 16
(France) Aravane Rezaï	3	4
(Russia) Alisa Kleybanova	6	6
WC	(Belgium) Kim Clijsters	6	3	5
5	(Serbia) Jelena Janković	1	6	7
Q	(Ukraine) Kateryna Bondarenko	5	3
14	(Poland) Agnieszka Radwańska	7	6
(Russia) Maria Sharapova	6	7
7	(Russia) Vera Zvonareva	2	6^{3}
(Australia) Samantha Stosur	6	6
(France) Virginie Razzano	3	1
(Israel) Shahar Pe'er	1	6	4
4	(Russia) Elena Dementieva	6	1	6
(China) Zheng Jie	6^{3}	4
Q	(Czech Republic) Lucie Šafářová	7	6
(Ukraine) Alona Bondarenko	1	4
2	(United States) Serena Williams	6	6

Quarterfinals
(Russia) Alisa Kleybanova	6^{6}	7	6
5	(Serbia) Jelena Janković	7	6^{7}	2
14	(Poland) Agnieszka Radwańska	2	6^{5}
(Russia) Maria Sharapova	6	7
(Australia) Samantha Stosur	7	1	3
4	(Russia) Elena Dementieva	6^{3}	6	6
Q	(Czech Republic) Lucie Šafářová	3	2
2	(United States) Serena Williams	6	6

Semifinals
(Russia) Alisa Kleybanova	2	6	4
(Russia) Maria Sharapova	6	4	6
4	(Russia) Elena Dementieva	7	6
2	(United States) Serena Williams	6^{2}	1

Final
(Russia) Maria Sharapova	4	3
4	(Russia) Elena Dementieva	6	6

== Week 6 ==
=== ATP - Pilot Pen Tennis ===
==== Main Draw Finals ====
Quarterfinals
1	(Russia) Nikolay Davydenko	3	6	4
6	(United States) Sam Querrey	6	3	6
(Argentina) José Acasuso	7	6
(France) Florent Serra	5	4
7	(Russia) Igor Andreev	6	6^{4}	6
(Argentina) Leonardo Mayer	4	7	3
11	(Austria) Jürgen Melzer	3	1
2/WC	(Spain) Fernando Verdasco	6	6

Semifinals
6	(United States) Sam Querrey	6	6
(Argentina) José Acasuso	3	4
7	(Russia) Igor Andreev	6^{4}	6^{5}
2/WC	(Spain) Fernando Verdasco	7	7

Final
6	(United States) Sam Querrey	4	6^{6}
2/WC	(Spain) Fernando Verdasco	6	7

=== WTA - Pilot Pen Tennis ===
==== Main Draw Finals ====
Quarterfinals
1/WC	(Russia) Svetlana Kuznetsova	6^{9}	6	3
8	(France) Amélie Mauresmo	7	2	6
(Russia) Anna Chakvetadze	1	5
(Russia) Elena Vesnina	6	7
Q	(Slovakia) Magdaléna Rybáriková	2	2
3	(Italy) Flavia Pennetta	6	6
(France) Virginie Razzano	4	3
2	(Denmark) Caroline Wozniacki	6	6

Semifinals
8	(France) Amélie Mauresmo	7	1	2
(Russia) Elena Vesnina	5	6	6
3	(Italy) Flavia Pennetta	4	1
2	(Denmark) Caroline Wozniacki	6	6

Final
(Russia) Elena Vesnina	2	4
2	(Denmark) Caroline Wozniacki	6	6
