= 2009 Rogers Cup =

- Date: August 8–16 (men); August 15–23 (women)
- Edition: 120th (men) / 108th (women)
- Surface: Hard / outdoor

Champions

Men's singles
- (United Kingdom) Andy Murray

Women's singles
- (Russia) Elena Dementieva

Men's doubles
- (India) Mahesh Bhupathi / (The Bahamas) Mark Knowles

Women's doubles
- (Spain) Nuria Llagostera Vives / (Spain) María José Martínez Sánchez
- Canadian Open

The 2009 Canadian Open (also known as the 2009 Rogers Masters presented by National Bank and 2009 Rogers Cup for sponsorship reasons) was a tennis tournament played on outdoor hard courts. It was the 120th edition of the Canada Masters for the men (the 108th edition for the women), and was part of the ATP World Tour Masters 1000 of the 2009 ATP World Tour, and of the Premier 5 of the 2009 WTA Tour. The men's event was held at the Uniprix Stadium in Montreal, Quebec, Canada, from August 8 through August 16, 2009, and the women's event was held at the Rexall Centre in Toronto, Ontario, Canada, from August 15 through August 23, 2009. It was the fourth event for both the men and women on the 2009 US Open Series.

== Finals ==
=== Men's singles ===
(United Kingdom) Andy Murray defeated (Argentina) Juan Martín del Potro, 6–7^{(4–7)}, 7–6^{(7–3)}, 6–1.

- It was Murray's fifth title of the year and 13th of his career. It was his second Masters 1000 title of the year.

For the first time in the ATP history, all top 8 seeded and top 8 ranked players reached the quarterfinals.

=== Women's singles ===
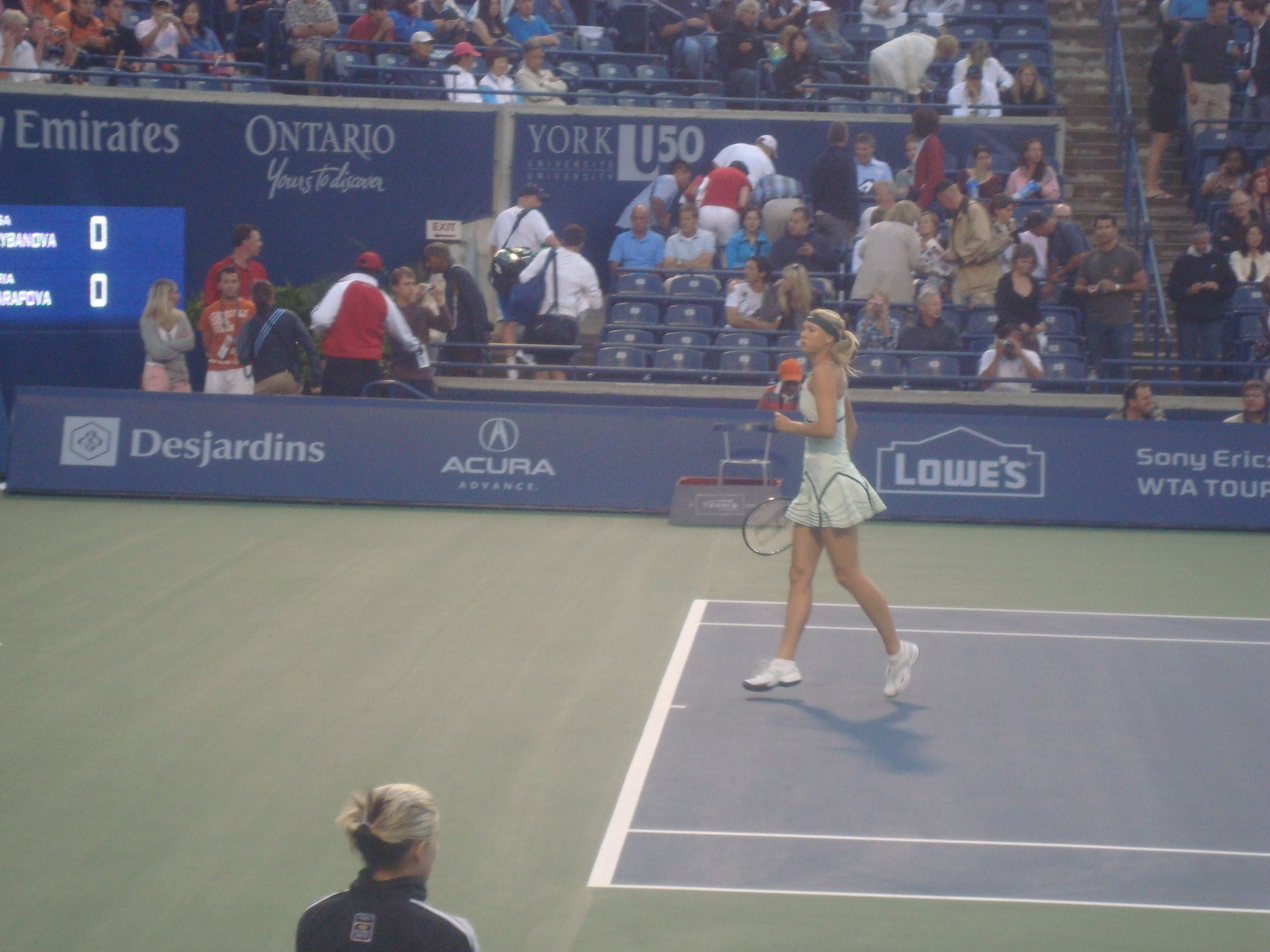
Maria Sharapova during semifinal game

(Russia) Elena Dementieva defeated (Russia) Maria Sharapova, 6–4, 6–3.

- It was Dementieva's third title of the year and 14th of her career.

=== Men's doubles ===
(India) Mahesh Bhupathi / (The Bahamas) Mark Knowles defeated (Belarus) Max Mirnyi / (Israel) Andy Ram, 6–4, 6–3.

=== Women's doubles ===
(Spain) Nuria Llagostera Vives / (Spain) María José Martínez Sánchez defeated (Australia) Samantha Stosur / (Australia) Rennae Stubbs, 2–6, 7–5, [11–9].

== ATP entrants ==
=== Seeds ===
| Country | Player | Rank^{*} | Seed |
|---|---|---|---|
| SUI | Roger Federer | 1 | 1 |
| ESP | Rafael Nadal | 2 | 2 |
| GBR | Andy Murray | 3 | 3 |
| SRB | Novak Djokovic | 4 | 4 |
| USA | Andy Roddick | 5 | 5 |
| ARG | Juan Martín del Potro | 6 | 6 |
| FRA | Jo-Wilfried Tsonga | 7 | 7 |
| RUS | Nikolay Davydenko | 8 | 8 |
| FRA | Gilles Simon | 9 | 9 |
| ESP | Fernando Verdasco | 10 | 10 |
| CHI | Fernando González | 11 | 11 |
| SWE | Robin Söderling | 12 | 12 |
| FRA | Gaël Monfils | 13 | 13 |
| CRO | Marin Čilić | 15 | 14 |
| ESP | Tommy Robredo | 16 | 15 |
| CZE | Radek Štěpánek | 17 | 16 |
| CZE | Tomáš Berdych | 18 | 17 |

- Seedings are based on the rankings of August 8, 2009
- Robin Söderling was forced to withdraw due to an elbow injury, so Tomáš Berdych became the no. 17 seed.

=== Other entrants ===
The following players received wildcards into the singles main draw

- (Canada) Bruno Agostinelli
- (Canada) Frank Dancevic
- (Canada) Peter Polansky
- (Canada) Frédéric Niemeyer

The following players received entry from the qualifying draw:

- (United States) Alex Bogomolov Jr.
- (Czech Republic) Jan Hernych
- (France) Julien Benneteau
- (United States) Jesse Levine
- (Spain) Juan Carlos Ferrero
- (Colombia) Alejandro Falla
- (Canada) Milos Raonic

The following player received the lucky loser spot:

- (Kazakhstan) Andrey Golubev

== WTA entrants ==
=== Seeds ===
| Country | Player | Rank^{1} | Seed |
|---|---|---|---|
| RUS | Dinara Safina | 1 | 1 |
| USA | Serena Williams | 2 | 2 |
| USA | Venus Williams | 3 | 3 |
| RUS | Elena Dementieva | 4 | 4 |
| SRB | Jelena Janković | 5 | 5 |
| RUS | Svetlana Kuznetsova | 6 | 6 |
| RUS | Vera Zvonareva | 7 | 7 |
| DEN | Caroline Wozniacki | 8 | 8 |
| BLR | Victoria Azarenka | 9 | 9 |
| RUS | Nadia Petrova | 10 | 10 |
| SRB | Ana Ivanovic | 11 | 11 |
| ITA | Flavia Pennetta | 12 | 12 |
| FRA | Marion Bartoli | 13 | 13 |
| POL | Agnieszka Radwańska | 14 | 14 |
| FRA | Amélie Mauresmo | 15 | 15 |
| SVK | Dominika Cibulková | 16 | 16 |

- Seedings are based on the rankings of August 10, 2009

=== Other entrants ===
The following players received wildcards into the singles main draw

- (Belgium) Kim Clijsters
- (Canada) Valérie Tétreault
- (Canada) Stéphanie Dubois

The following players received entry from the qualifying draw:

- (United Kingdom) Elena Baltacha
- (Ukraine) Kateryna Bondarenko
- (France) Julie Coin
- (Canada) Heidi El Tabakh
- (Russia) Maria Kirilenko
- (Russia) Alla Kudryavtseva
- (Romania) Monica Niculescu
- (Slovakia) Magdaléna Rybáriková
- (Czech Republic) Lucie Šafářová
- (Kazakhstan) Yaroslava Shvedova
- (Italy) Roberta Vinci
- (Belgium) Yanina Wickmayer

| Preceded by Washington, D.C. | 2009 US Open Series; Men's Events | Succeeded by Cincinnati |
| Preceded by Cincinnati | 2009 US Open Series; Women's Events | Succeeded by New Haven |
