= 2008 East West Bank Classic – Doubles =

Doubles
- 2008 East West Bank Classic

Final
- Champions: (Chinese Taipei) Yung-jan Chan (Chinese Taipei) Chia-jung Chuang
- Runners-up: (Czech Republic) Eva Hrdinová (Czech Republic) Vladimíra Uhlířová
- Score: 2–6, 7–5, 10–4

Details
- Draw: 16
- Seeds: 4

Events
Singles	Doubles
← 2007 ·	WTA Los Angeles	· 2009 →

Květa Peschke and Rennae Stubbs were the defending champions, but chose not to participate that year.

Yung-jan Chan and Chia-jung Chuang won in the final 2–6, 7–5, 10–4, against Eva Hrdinová and Vladimíra Uhlířová.

== Seeds ==
1. (Chinese Taipei) Yung-jan Chan / (Chinese Taipei) Chia-jung Chuang (champions)
2. (United States) Bethanie Mattek / (India) Sania Mirza (semifinals, retired due to a low back injury for Mattek)
3. (Belarus) Victoria Azarenka / (Belarus) Tatiana Poutchek (first round)
4. (United States) Lisa Raymond / (Australia) Samantha Stosur (semifinals)

== Draw ==
=== Key ===
- Q = Qualifier
- WC = Wild card
- LL = Lucky loser
- Alt = Alternate
- SE = Special exempt
- PR = Protected ranking
- ITF = ITF entry
- JE = Junior exempt
- w/o = Walkover
- r = Retired
- d = Defaulted
- SR = Special ranking

=== Draw ===
First round
1	(Chinese Taipei) Y-j Chan (Chinese Taipei) C-j Chuang	7	6
(United States) J Craybas (United States) A Spears	6^{1}	2
(Uzbekistan) A Amanmuradova (Ukraine) K Bondarenko	2	5
(Slovakia) D Hantuchová (Italy) F Pennetta	6	7
4	(United States) L Raymond (Australia) S Stosur	6	6
WC	(Germany) S Lisicki (Czech Republic) N Vaidišová	3	1
(China) S Peng (Russia) N Petrova	6	6
(Belarus) O Govortsova (Belarus) D Kustova	1	4
(Czech Republic) E Hrdinová (Czech Republic) V Uhlířová	6	6
(Argentina) G Dulko (Israel) S Pe'er	3	4
(Japan) A Morita (Japan) A Sugiyama	6	6
3	(Belarus) V Azarenka (Belarus) T Poutchek	3	2
(Russia) E Vesnina (Russia) V Zvonareva	6	6
WC	(United States) T Lin (United States) R Zalameda	4	4
(United States) V King (Russia) A Kudryavtseva	3	4
2	(United States) B Mattek (India) S Mirza	6	6

Quarterfinals
1	(Chinese Taipei) Y-j Chan (Chinese Taipei) C-j Chuang	6	6
(Slovakia) D Hantuchová (Italy) F Pennetta	1	2
4	(United States) L Raymond (Australia) S Stosur	2	6	[11]
(China) S Peng (Russia) N Petrova	6	1	[9]
(Czech Republic) E Hrdinová (Czech Republic) V Uhlířová	4	7	[12]
(Japan) A Morita (Japan) A Sugiyama	6	5	[10]
(Russia) E Vesnina (Russia) V Zvonareva	3	6	[8]
2	(United States) B Mattek (India) S Mirza	6	1	[10]

Semifinals
1	(Chinese Taipei) Y-j Chan (Chinese Taipei) C-j Chuang	7	3	[11]
4	(United States) L Raymond (Australia) S Stosur	6^{3}	6	[7]
(Czech Republic) E Hrdinová (Czech Republic) V Uhlířová	6	2
2	(United States) B Mattek (India) S Mirza	2	1	r

Final
1	(Chinese Taipei) Y-j Chan (Chinese Taipei) C-j Chuang	2	7	[10]
(Czech Republic) E Hrdinová (Czech Republic) V Uhlířová	6	5	[4]
