= 2009 Western & Southern Financial Group Masters and Women's Open =

2009 Western & Southern Financial Group Masters and Western & Southern Financial Group Women's Open
- Date: August 15–23 (men); August 8–16 (women)
- Edition: 108th
- Surface: Hard / outdoor
- Location: Mason, United States
- Venue: Lindner Family Tennis Center

Champions

Men's singles
- (Switzerland) Roger Federer

Women's singles
- (Serbia) Jelena Janković

Men's doubles
- (Canada) Daniel Nestor / (Serbia) Nenad Zimonjić

Women's doubles
- (Zimbabwe) Cara Black / (United States) Liezel Huber
- Western & Southern Financial Group Masters Western & Southern Financial Group Women's Open

The 2009 Cincinnati Masters (also known as the Western & Southern Financial Group Masters and Western & Southern Financial Group Women's Open for sponsorship reasons) was a tennis tournament played on outdoor hard courts. It was the 108th edition of the Cincinnati Masters, and was part of the ATP Masters Series of the 2009 ATP World Tour, and of the Premier Series of the 2009 WTA Tour. Both the men's and the women's events were held at the Lindner Family Tennis Center in Mason, near Cincinnati, Ohio, United States, with the men playing from August 17 through August 23, 2009, and the women from August 10 through August 16, 2009. It was the third women's event and the fifth men's event on the 2009 US Open Series. Former world No. 1 Kim Clijsters made her return to the Sony Ericsson WTA Tour in Cincinnati.

== Points and prize money ==
=== Points distribution ===
Event	W	F	SF	QF	R16	R32	R64	Q	Q2	Q1
Men's singles	1000	600	360	180	90	45	10	25	14	0
Men's doubles	1000	600	360	180	90	0	—N/a	—N/a	—N/a	—N/a
Women's singles	800	550	350	200	110	60	1	30	20	1
Women's doubles	800	550	350	200	110	1	—N/a	—N/a	—N/a	—N/a

=== Prize money ===
Event	W	F	SF	QF	Round of 16	Round of 32	Round of 64
Men's singles	$443,500	$222,000	$113,725	$59,200	$31,000	$16,250	$8,500
Women's singles	$350,000	$175,000	$87,500	$40,000	$20,000	$10,275	$5,400
Women's doubles*	$100,000	$50,000	$25,000	$12,500	$6,250	$3,170	—N/a

*per team

== Finals ==
=== Men's singles ===
(Switzerland) Roger Federer defeated (Serbia) Novak Djokovic 6–1, 7–5.

- It was Federer's fourth title of the year and 61st overall. It was his third win at the event, also winning in 2005 and 2007.

=== Women's singles ===
(Serbia) Jelena Janković defeated (Russia) Dinara Safina 6–4, 6–2.

- It was Janković's second title of the year and 11th overall.

=== Men's doubles ===
(Canada) Daniel Nestor / (Serbia) Nenad Zimonjić defeated (United States) Bob Bryan / (United States) Mike Bryan, 3–6, 7–6^{(7–2)}, [15–13].

=== Women's doubles ===
(Zimbabwe) Cara Black / (United States) Liezel Huber defeated (Spain) Nuria Llagostera Vives / (Spain) María José Martínez Sánchez, 6–3, 0–6, [10–2].

== WTA entrants ==
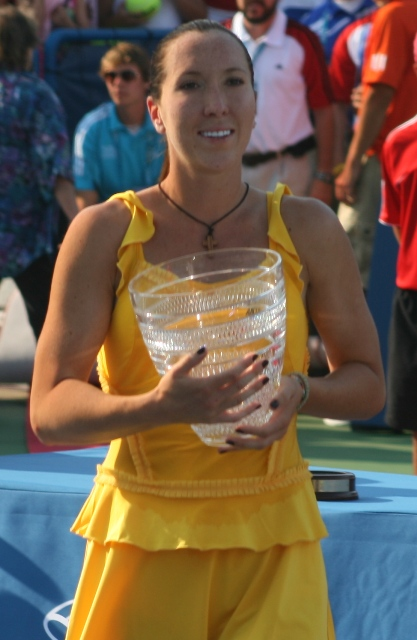
Jelena Janković won the women's title, beating No. 1 seed Dinara Safina

=== Seeds ===
Country	Player	Rank^{1}	Seed
RUS	Dinara Safina	1	1
USA	Serena Williams	2	2
USA	Venus Williams	3	3
RUS	Elena Dementieva	4	4
SRB	Jelena Janković	5	5
RUS	Svetlana Kuznetsova	6	6
RUS	Vera Zvonareva	7	7
DEN	Caroline Wozniacki	8	8
BLR	Victoria Azarenka	9	9
RUS	Nadia Petrova	10	10
SRB	Ana Ivanovic	11	11
FRA	Marion Bartoli	12	12
POL	Agnieszka Radwańska	13	13
ITA	Flavia Pennetta	14	14
SVK	Dominika Cibulková	16	15
FRA	Virginie Razzano	18	16

- ^{1} As of August 3, 2009

=== Other entrants ===
The following players received wildcards into the singles main draw:

- (Belgium) Kim Clijsters
- (Russia) Maria Kirilenko
- (United States) Meghann Shaughnessy

The following players received entry from the qualifying draw:

- (Ukraine) Kateryna Bondarenko
- (Belarus) Olga Govortsova
- (Germany) Tatjana Malek
- (Japan) Ayumi Morita
- (United States) Melanie Oudin
- (Poland) Urszula Radwańska
- (Kazakhstan) Yaroslava Shvedova
- (Belgium) Yanina Wickmayer

== ATP entrants ==
=== Seeds ===
Country	Player	Rank^{*}	Seed
SUI	Roger Federer	1	1
ESP	Rafael Nadal	2	2
GBR	Andy Murray	3	3
SRB	Novak Djokovic	4	4
USA	Andy Roddick	5	5
ARG	Juan Martín del Potro	6	6
FRA	Jo-Wilfried Tsonga	7	7
RUS	Nikolay Davydenko	8	8
FRA	Gilles Simon	9	9
CHI	Fernando González	10	10
ESP	Fernando Verdasco	11	11
SWE	Robin Söderling	12	12
FRA	Gaël Monfils	13	13
CRO	Marin Čilić	15	14
ESP	Tommy Robredo	16	15
CZE	Radek Štěpánek	17	16

- Seedings are based on the rankings of August 10, 2009

=== Other entrants ===
The following players received wildcards into the singles main draw

- (United States) Robby Ginepri
- (United States) John Isner
- (United States) Wayne Odesnik
- (Russia) Marat Safin

The following players received entry from the qualifying draw:

- (Italy) Simone Bolelli
- (Australia) Chris Guccione
- (Czech Republic) Jan Hernych
- (Poland) Łukasz Kubot
- (Croatia) Ivan Ljubičić
- (Chinese Taipei) Lu Yen-hsun
- (Russia) Mikhail Youzhny

The following players received the lucky loser spot:

- (France) Julien Benneteau

Preceded by Montreal	2009 US Open Series; Men's Events	Succeeded by New Haven
Preceded by Los Angeles	2009 US Open Series; Women's Events	Succeeded by Toronto
