= 2008 East West Bank Classic – Singles =

Singles
- 2008 East West Bank Classic

Final
- Champion: (Russia) Dinara Safina
- Runner-up: (Italy) Flavia Pennetta
- Score: 6–4, 6–2

Details
- Draw: 56 (3WC/8Q/2LL)
- Seeds: 16

Events
Singles	Doubles
- LA Women's Tennis Championships

Ana Ivanovic was the defending champion, but chose not to participate that year.

Dinara Safina won in the final 6–4, 6–2, against Flavia Pennetta.

== Seeds ==
The top eight seeds received a bye into the second round.

1. (Serbia) Jelena Janković (semifinals)
2. (United States) ~~Serena Williams~~ (withdrew due to a left knee injury)
3. (Russia) Anna Chakvetadze (third round)
4. (Russia) Dinara Safina (champion)
5. (Russia) Vera Zvonareva (third round)
6. (Slovakia) Daniela Hantuchová (second round)
7. (Switzerland) Patty Schnyder (second round)
8. (Belarus) Victoria Azarenka (quarterfinals)
9. (Russia) Nadia Petrova (quarterfinals)
10. (Italy) Flavia Pennetta (final)
11. (Czech Republic) Nicole Vaidišová (second round)
12. (Israel) Shahar Pe'er (first round)
13. (France) Virginie Razzano (first round)
14. (Austria) Sybille Bammer (quarterfinals)
15. (Slovakia) Dominika Cibulková (second round)
16. (India) Sania Mirza (second round)

== Draw ==
Key

- Q = Qualifier
- WC = Wild card
- LL = Lucky loser
- Alt = Alternate
- ITF = ITF entry
- PR = Protected ranking
- SR = Special ranking
- SE = Special exempt
- JE = Junior exempt
- JR = Junior Accelerator Programme entrant
- CO = College Accelerator Programme entrant
- NG = Next Gen Accelerator Program entrant
- w/o = Walkover
- r = Retired
- d = Defaulted

=== Finals ===
Quarterfinals
1	(Serbia) Jelena Janković	7	6
9	(Russia) Nadia Petrova	5	4
4	(Russia) Dinara Safina	6	6
8	(Belarus) Victoria Azarenka	3	1
10	(Italy) Flavia Pennetta	7	3	6
14	(Austria) Sybille Bammer	6^{3}	6	1
WC	(United States) Bethanie Mattek	6	7
(China) Meng Yuan	2	5

Semifinals
1	(Serbia) Jelena Janković	6^{3}	1
4	(Russia) Dinara Safina	7	6
10	(Italy) Flavia Pennetta	3	6	7
WC	(United States) Bethanie Mattek	6	2	5

Final
4	(Russia) Dinara Safina	6	6
10	(Italy) Flavia Pennetta	4	2

=== Top half ===
==== Section 1 ====
First round
(United States) V King	6	6
Q	(United States) A Haynes	3	3
(Ukraine) O Savchuk	6	6
(Argentina) G Dulko	4	3
LL	(Hungary) M Czink	6	6
13	(France) V Razzano	3	3
9	(Russia) N Petrova	6	6
Q	(Russia) A Jidkova	0	4
(Uzbekistan) A Amanmuradova	6	6
WC	(United States) J Jackson	2	2
(United Kingdom) A Keothavong	3	2
(United States) J Craybas	6	6

Second round
1	(Serbia) J Janković	7	6
(United States) V King	5	2
(Ukraine) O Savchuk	4	6	4
LL	(Hungary) M Czink	6	2	6
9	(Russia) N Petrova	6	3	6
(Uzbekistan) A Amanmuradova	1	6	1
(United States) J Craybas	4	6^{2}
5	(Russia) V Zvonareva	6	7

Third round
1	(Serbia) J Janković	6	6
LL	(Hungary) M Czink	3	2
9	(Russia) N Petrova	6	7
5	(Russia) V Zvonareva	4	5

Quarterfinals
1	(Serbia) J Janković	7	6
9	(Russia) N Petrova	5	4

==== Section 2 ====
First round
(China) S Peng	6	6
(United States) J Ditty	4	2
(Russia) A Rodionova	5	6	3
Q	(Russia) A Kudryavtseva	7	3	6
(Romania) M Niculescu	4	3
15	(Slovakia) D Cibulková	6	6
12	(Israel) S Pe'er	1	1
(Australia) S Stosur	6	6
(Russia) E Vesnina	4	6	2
Q	(Russia) R Kulikova	6	4	6
(Chinese Taipei) Y-j Chan	6	6
(France) A Rezaï	1	4

Second round
4	(Russia) D Safina	6	6
(China) S Peng	2	2
Q	(Russia) A Kudryavtseva	3	7	6
15	(Slovakia) D Cibulková	6	5	4
(Australia) S Stosur	7	7
Q	(Russia) R Kulikova	6^{4}	5
(Chinese Taipei) Y-j Chan	1	3
8	(Belarus) V Azarenka	6	6

Third round
4	(Russia) D Safina	7	0	7
Q	(Russia) A Kudryavtseva	6^{1}	6	6^{3}
(Australia) S Stosur	4	6^{4}
8	(Belarus) V Azarenka	6	7

Quarterfinals
4	(Russia) D Safina	6	6
8	(Belarus) V Azarenka	3	1

=== Bottom half ===
==== Section 3 ====
First round
(Germany) S Lisicki	4	4
(Japan) A Sugiyama	6	6
(Japan) A Nakamura	4	2
(Austria) T Paszek	6	6
(Canada) A Wozniak	1	0
10	(Italy) F Pennetta	6	6
14	(Austria) S Bammer	6	6
Q	(United States) A Rolle	0	4
(United States) A Harkleroad	2	3
(Canada) S Dubois	6	6
(Poland) M Domachowska	6	6
WC	(United States) C Vandeweghe	3	3

Second round
7	(Switzerland) P Schnyder	4	5
(Japan) A Sugiyama	6	7
(Austria) T Paszek	6	1	4
10	(Italy) F Pennetta	2	6	6
14	(Austria) S Bammer	6	7
(Canada) S Dubois	3	5
(Poland) M Domachowska	1	1
3	(Russia) A Chakvetadze	6	6

Third round
(Japan) A Sugiyama	6^{5}	3
10	(Italy) F Pennetta	7	6
14	(Austria) S Bammer	6	5	6
3	(Russia) A Chakvetadze	4	7	2

Quarterfinals
10	(Italy) F Pennetta	7	3	6
14	(Austria) S Bammer	6^{3}	6	1

==== Section 4 ====
First round
Q	(Belarus) D Kustova	3	4
(Belarus) O Govortsova	6	6
WC	(United States) B Mattek	6	6
Q	(United States) A Spears	2	4
(Japan) A Morita	7	3	1
11	(Czech Republic) N Vaidišová	6^{5}	6	6
16	(India) S Mirza	6	6
Q	(Czech Republic) E Hrdinová	3	4
(Ukraine) K Bondarenko	6	6^{5}	4
(China) M Yuan	2	7	6
(Czech Republic) P Kvitová	6	1	7
(Russia) A Kleybanova	4	6	5

Second round
6	(Slovakia) D Hantuchová	2	4
(Belarus) O Govortsova	6	6
WC	(United States) B Mattek	6	6
11	(Czech Republic) N Vaidišová	4	0
16	(India) S Mirza	4	3
(China) M Yuan	6	6
(Czech Republic) P Kvitová	4	2
LL	(United Kingdom) M South	6	6

Third round
(Belarus) O Govortsova	5	2
WC	(United States) B Mattek	7	6
(China) M Yuan	6	6
LL	(United Kingdom) M South	2	3

Quarterfinals
WC	(United States) B Mattek	6	7
(China) M Yuan	2	5

== Qualifying ==
=== Qualifying seeds ===
1. (Russia) Alla Kudryavtseva (qualified)
2. (Russia) Olga Puchkova (first round)
3. (Hungary) Melinda Czink (qualifying competition, lucky loser)
4. (United States) Lilia Osterloh (qualifying competition)
5. (United States) Ahsha Rolle (qualified)
6. (United Kingdom) Melanie South (qualifying competition, lucky loser)
7. (Belarus) Tatiana Poutchek (qualifying competition)
8. (Japan) Rika Fujiwara (qualifying competition)
9. (United States) Abigail Spears (qualified)
10. (Czech Republic) Eva Hrdinová (qualified)
11. (Georgia (country)) Anna Tatishvili (first round)
12. (United States) Angela Haynes (qualified)
13. (Australia) Monique Adamczak (qualifying competition)
14. (France) Julie Coin (first round)
15. (Russia) Regina Kulikova (qualified)
16. (Russia) Alina Jidkova (qualified)

=== Qualifiers ===
1. (Russia) Alla Kudryavtseva
2. (Belarus) Darya Kustova
3. (Russia) Regina Kulikova
4. (Russia) Alina Jidkova
5. (United States) Ahsha Rolle
6. (Czech Republic) Eva Hrdinová
7. (United States) Abigail Spears
8. (United States) Angela Haynes

=== Lucky losers ===
1. (Hungary) Melinda Czink
2. (United Kingdom) Melanie South

=== Qualifying draw ===
==== First qualifier ====
First round
1	(Russia) Alla Kudryavtseva	6	6
WC	(United States) Kady Pooler	1	0
(South Africa) Surina De Beer	1	4
13	(Australia) Monique Adamczak	6	6

Qualifying competition
1	(Russia) Alla Kudryavtseva	6	7
13	(Australia) Monique Adamczak	4	5

==== Second qualifier ====
First round
2	(Russia) Olga Puchkova	6	1	4
(Belarus) Darya Kustova	3	6	6
(United States) Alexa Glatch	6	4	6
11	(Georgia (country)) Anna Tatishvili	1	6	3

Qualifying competition
(Belarus) Darya Kustova	6	7^{7}
(United States) Alexa Glatch	2	6^{3}

==== Third qualifier ====
First round
3	(Hungary) Melinda Czink	6	6
WC	(United States) Riza Zalameda	2	2
WC	(United States) Ashley Weinhold	1	0
15	(Russia) Regina Kulikova	6	6

Qualifying competition
3	(Hungary) Melinda Czink	7^{7}	6^{4}	4
15	(Russia) Regina Kulikova	6^{5}	7^{7}	6

==== Fourth qualifier ====
First round
4	(United States) Lilia Osterloh	6	6
WC	(United States) Lindsey Nelson	1	2
(United States) Anne Yelsey	4	6^{5}
16	(Russia) Alina Jidkova	6	7^{7}

Qualifying competition
4	(United States) Lilia Osterloh	1	2
16	(Russia) Alina Jidkova	6	6

==== Fifth qualifier ====
First round
5	(United States) Ahsha Rolle	6	6
(Portugal) Michelle Larcher de Brito	2	4
WC	(United States) Asia Muhammad	6	7^{7}
14	(France) Julie Coin	3	6^{3}

Qualifying competition
5	(United States) Ahsha Rolle	0	6	6
WC	(United States) Asia Muhammad	6	2	4

==== Sixth qualifier ====
First round
6	(United Kingdom) Melanie South	7^{7}	4	6
WC	(Belarus) Katsarina Zheltova	6^{4}	6	4
(United States) Alexandra Podkolzina	3	4
10	(Czech Republic) Eva Hrdinová	6	6

Qualifying competition
6	(United Kingdom) Melanie South	1	3
10	(Czech Republic) Eva Hrdinová	6	6

==== Seventh qualifier ====
First round
7	(Belarus) Tatiana Poutchek	6	6
WC	(United States) Brittany Augustine	1	2
(United States) Alexandra Stevenson	5	2^{r}
9	(United States) Abigail Spears	7	4

Qualifying competition
7	(Belarus) Tatiana Poutchek	6	3	3
9	(United States) Abigail Spears	4	6	6

==== Eighth qualifier ====
First round
8	(Japan) Rika Fujiwara	4	6	6
WC	(United States) Julia Boserup	6	1	2
(Mexico) Melissa Torres Sandoval	5	3
12	(United States) Angela Haynes	7	6

Qualifying competition
8	(Japan) Rika Fujiwara	4	2
12	(United States) Angela Haynes	6	6
