= 2009 LA Women's Tennis Championships – Doubles =

Doubles
- 2009 LA Women's Tennis Championships

Final
- Champion: (Chinese Taipei) Chuang Chia-jung (China) Yan Zi
- Runner-up: (Russia) Maria Kirilenko (Poland) Agnieszka Radwańska
- Score: 6–0, 4–6, [10–7]

Details
- Draw: 16
- Seeds: 4

Events
Singles	Doubles
← 2008 ·	LA Women's Tennis Championships

Chan Yung-jan and Chuang Chia-jung were the defending champions, but Chan chose not to compete that year.
Chuang partnered with Yan Zi, and they won in the final, 6–0, 4–6, [10–7], against Maria Kirilenko and Agnieszka Radwańska.

== Seeds ==
1. (Australia) Samantha Stosur / (Australia) Rennae Stubbs (quarterfinals)
2. (Slovakia) Daniela Hantuchová / (Japan) Ai Sugiyama (quarterfinals)
3. (Italy) Flavia Pennetta / (United States) Lisa Raymond (first round)
4. (Chinese Taipei) Hsieh Su-wei / (China) Peng Shuai (semifinals)

== Draw ==
=== Key ===
- Q = Qualifier
- WC = Wild card
- LL = Lucky loser
- Alt = Alternate
- SE = Special exempt
- PR = Protected ranking
- ITF = ITF entry
- JE = Junior exempt
- w/o = Walkover
- r = Retired
- d = Defaulted
- SR = Special ranking

=== Draw ===
First round
1	(Australia) S Stosur (Australia) R Stubbs	6	6
(Spain) V Ruano Pascual (China) J Zheng	4	4
(Russia) A Kudryavtseva (Russia) A Rodionova	2	6	[4]
(Russia) M Kirilenko (Poland) A Radwańska	6	4	[10]
4	(Chinese Taipei) S-w Hsieh (China) S Peng	6	6
(Belarus) T Poutchek (Ukraine) O Savchuk	2	3
(Ukraine) A Bondarenko (Russia) E Vesnina	6	7
(Russia) A Kleybanova (Russia) E Makarova	4	6^{4}
(Italy) T Garbin (Italy) F Schiavone	6	6
(United States) M Shaughnessy (United States) A Spears	1	4
(United States) V King (Romania) M Niculescu	7	6
3	(Italy) F Pennetta (United States) L Raymond	5	3
(Romania) S Cîrstea (Denmark) C Wozniacki	6	4	[5]
(Chinese Taipei) C-j Chuang (China) Z Yan	1	6	[10]
WC	(United States) J Craybas (United States) C Gullickson	4	1
2	(Slovakia) D Hantuchová (Japan) A Sugiyama	6	6

Quarterfinals
1	(Australia) S Stosur (Australia) R Stubbs	3	6^{3}
(Russia) M Kirilenko (Poland) A Radwańska	6	7
4	(Chinese Taipei) S-w Hsieh (China) S Peng	w/o
(Ukraine) A Bondarenko (Russia) E Vesnina
(Italy) T Garbin (Italy) F Schiavone
(United States) V King (Romania) M Niculescu	w/o
(Chinese Taipei) C-j Chuang (China) Z Yan	1	6	[10]
2	(Slovakia) D Hantuchová (Japan) A Sugiyama	6	3	[7]

Semifinals
(Russia) M Kirilenko (Poland) A Radwańska	6	6
4	(Chinese Taipei) S-w Hsieh (China) S Peng	1	2
(United States) V King (Romania) M Niculescu	6	2	[9]
(Chinese Taipei) C-j Chuang (China) Z Yan	1	6	[11]

Final
(Russia) M Kirilenko (Poland) A Radwańska	0	6	[7]
(Chinese Taipei) C-j Chuang (China) Z Yan	6	4	[10]
