= 2009 Western & Southern Financial Group Women's Open – Doubles =

Doubles
- 2009 Western & Southern Financial Group Women's Open

Final
- Champions: (Zimbabwe) Cara Black (United States) Liezel Huber
- Runners-up: (Spain) Nuria Llagostera Vives (Spain) María José Martínez Sánchez
- Score: 6–3, 0–6, 10–2

Details
- Seeds: 8

Events
Singles	Doubles
← 2008 ·	Western & Southern Financial Group Women's Open	· 2010 →

Maria Kirilenko and Nadia Petrova were the defending champions. Both were present that year, but chose to compete with different players.
Kirilenko partnered with Elena Vesnina, but lost in the second round to Nuria Llagostera Vives and María José Martínez Sánchez.
Petrova partnered with Bethanie Mattek-Sands, but lost in the quarterfinals to Cara Black and Liezel Huber.

Cara Black and Liezel Huber won in the final 6–3, 0–6, 10–2 against Nuria Llagostera Vives and María José Martínez Sánchez.

== Seeds ==
The top four seeds receive a bye into the second round.

1. (Zimbabwe) Cara Black / (United States) Liezel Huber (champions)
2. (Slovakia) Daniela Hantuchová / (Japan) Ai Sugiyama (quarterfinals, withdrew)
3. (Chinese Taipei) Hsieh Su-wei / (China) Peng Shuai (second round)
4. (Italy) Flavia Pennetta / (United States) Lisa Raymond (second round)
5. (Spain) Virginia Ruano Pascual / (China) Zheng Jie (semifinals)
6. (Germany) Anna-Lena Grönefeld / (Switzerland) Patty Schnyder (first round)
7. (Spain) Nuria Llagostera Vives / (Spain) María José Martínez Sánchez (final)
8. (United States) Bethanie Mattek-Sands / (Russia) Nadia Petrova (quarterfinals)

== Draw ==
=== Key ===
- Q = Qualifier
- WC = Wild card
- LL = Lucky loser
- Alt = Alternate
- ITF = ITF entry
- PR = Protected ranking
- SR = Special ranking
- SE = Special exempt
- JE = Junior exempt
- JR = Junior Accelerator Programme entrant
- CO = College Accelerator Programme entrant
- NG = Next Gen Accelerator Program entrant
- w/o = Walkover
- r = Retired
- d = Defaulted

=== Finals ===
Semifinals
1	(Zimbabwe) Cara Black (United States) Liezel Huber	6	6
(Uzbekistan) Akgul Amanmuradova (Romania) Monica Niculescu	4	1
7	(Spain) Nuria Llagostera Vives (Spain) María José Martínez Sánchez	6	6
5	(Spain) Virginia Ruano Pascual (China) Zheng Jie	1	4

Final
1	(Zimbabwe) Cara Black (United States) Liezel Huber	6	0	[10]
7	(Spain) Nuria Llagostera Vives (Spain) María José Martínez Sánchez	3	6	[2]

=== Top half ===
First round
(India) S Mirza (Italy) F Schiavone	1	6	[10]
(Ukraine) M Koryttseva (Belarus) T Poutchek	6	4	[6]
(Turkey) İ Şenoğlu (Kazakhstan) Y Shvedova	6	6
(Russia) A Kudryavtseva (Ukraine) O Savchuk	3	2
(Czech Republic) I Benešová (Russia) M Kondratieva	1	7	[6]
8	(United States) B Mattek-Sands (Russia) N Petrova	6	6^{6}	[10]
(Russia) V Dushevina (Russia) A Rodionova	7	6
(Latvia) L Dekmeijere (United States) J Ditty	5	0
(United States) L Granville (United States) C Gullickson	2	3
(Uzbekistan) A Amanmuradova (Romania) M Niculescu	6	6
(Ukraine) A Bondarenko (Ukraine) K Bondarenko	6	6
6	(Germany) A-L Grönefeld (Switzerland) P Schnyder	4	2

Second round
1	(Zimbabwe) C Black (United States) L Huber	6	6
(India) S Mirza (Italy) F Schiavone	4	3
(Turkey) İ Şenoğlu (Kazakhstan) Y Shvedova	3	3
8	(United States) B Mattek-Sands (Russia) N Petrova	6	6
3	(Chinese Taipei) S-w Hsieh (China) S Peng	6	4	[6]
(Russia) V Dushevina (Russia) A Rodionova	1	6	[10]
(Uzbekistan) A Amanmuradova (Romania) M Niculescu	6	4	[10]
(Ukraine) A Bondarenko (Ukraine) K Bondarenko	4	6	[6]

Quarterfinals
1	(Zimbabwe) C Black (United States) L Huber	6	1	[13]
8	(United States) B Mattek-Sands (Russia) N Petrova	4	6	[11]
(Russia) V Dushevina (Russia) A Rodionova	6	3	[8]
(Uzbekistan) A Amanmuradova (Romania) M Niculescu	4	6	[10]

Semifinals
1	(Zimbabwe) C Black (United States) L Huber	6	6
(Uzbekistan) A Amanmuradova (Romania) M Niculescu	4	1

=== Bottom half ===
First round
7	(Spain) N Llagostera Vives (Spain) MJ Martínez Sánch.	7	4	[10]
(Poland) K Jans (Poland) A Rosolska	5	6	[8]
(Russia) M Kirilenko (Russia) E Vesnina	6	6
(Chinese Taipei) C-j Chuang (China) Z Yan	4	0
(Russia) A Kleybanova (Russia) E Makarova	6^{5}	6	[10]
(Czech Republic) L Šafářová (Kazakhstan) G Voskoboeva	7	4	[4]
5	(Spain) V Ruano Pascual (China) J Zheng	6	6
(United States) J Craybas (United States) A Spears	4	3
(Argentina) G Dulko (Israel) S Pe'er	6	6
Alt	(United Kingdom) S Borwell (South Africa) N Grandin	3	2
WC	(Belgium) K Clijsters (Belgium) Y Wickmayer	3	6	[8]
WC	(United States) M Oudin (United States) S Perry	6	3	[10]

Second round
7	(Spain) N Llagostera Vives (Spain) MJ Martínez Sánch.	6	6
(Russia) M Kirilenko (Russia) E Vesnina	4	2
(Russia) A Kleybanova (Russia) E Makarova	4	6	[10]
4	(Italy) F Pennetta (United States) L Raymond	6	3	[2]
5	(Spain) V Ruano Pascual (China) J Zheng	6	6
(Argentina) G Dulko (Israel) S Pe'er	3	3
WC	(United States) M Oudin (United States) S Perry	3	2
2	(Slovakia) D Hantuchová (Japan) A Sugiyama	6	6

Quarterfinals
7	(Spain) N Llagostera Vives (Spain) MJ Martínez Sánch.	0	7	[10]
(Russia) A Kleybanova (Russia) E Makarova	6	5	[8]
5	(Spain) V Ruano Pascual (China) J Zheng	w/o
2	(Slovakia) D Hantuchová (Japan) A Sugiyama

Semifinals
7	(Spain) N Llagostera Vives (Spain) MJ Martínez Sánchez	6	6
5	(Spain) V Ruano Pascual (China) J Zheng	1	4
