= 2009 Western & Southern Financial Group Women's Open – Singles =

Singles
- 2009 Western & Southern Financial Group Women's Open

Final
- Champion: (Serbia) Jelena Janković
- Runner-up: (Russia) Dinara Safina
- Score: 6–4, 6–2

Details
- Draw: 56 (3WC/8Q)
- Seeds: 16

Events
Singles	Doubles
- Cincinnati Open

Jelena Janković defeated Dinara Safina in the final, 6–4, 6–2 to win the women's singles tennis title at the 2009 Cincinnati Masters.

Nadia Petrova was the defending champion, but lost in the first round to Alona Bondarenko.

This tournament marked the return of Kim Clijsters from the sport after her first retirement, having not played a match since May 2007. She advanced to the quarterfinals, where she was beaten by Safina.

== Seeds ==
The top eight seeds receive a bye into the second round.

1. (Russia) Dinara Safina (final)
2. (United States) Serena Williams (third round)
3. (United States) Venus Williams (third round)
4. (Russia) Elena Dementieva (semifinals)
5. (Serbia) Jelena Janković (champion)
6. (Russia) Svetlana Kuznetsova (third round)
7. (Russia) Vera Zvonareva (third round)
8. (Denmark) Caroline Wozniacki (quarterfinals)
9. (Belarus) Victoria Azarenka (third round)
10. (Russia) Nadia Petrova (first round)
11. (Serbia) Ana Ivanovic (second round)
12. (France) Marion Bartoli (first round)
13. (Poland) Agnieszka Radwańska (second round)
14. (Italy) Flavia Pennetta (semifinals)
15. (Slovakia) Dominika Cibulková (first round)
16. (France) Virginie Razzano (first round)

== Main draw ==
Key

- Q = Qualifier
- WC = Wild card
- LL = Lucky loser
- Alt = Alternate
- ITF = ITF entry
- PR = Protected ranking
- SR = Special ranking
- SE = Special exempt
- JE = Junior exempt
- JR = Junior Accelerator Programme entrant
- CO = College Accelerator Programme entrant
- NG = Next Gen Accelerator Program entrant
- w/o = Walkover
- r = Retired
- d = Defaulted

=== Finals ===
Quarterfinals
1	(Russia) Dinara Safina	6	7
WC	(Belgium) Kim Clijsters	2	5
14	(Italy) Flavia Pennetta	6	6
(Slovakia) Daniela Hantuchová	3	3
8	(Denmark) Caroline Wozniacki	2	1
4	(Russia) Elena Dementieva	6	6
5	(Serbia) Jelena Janković	6	6
(Austria) Sybille Bammer	0	3

Semifinals
1	(Russia) Dinara Safina	6	6
14	(Italy) Flavia Pennetta	2	0
4	(Russia) Elena Dementieva	6^{2}	6	6^{6}
5	(Serbia) Jelena Janković	7	0	7

Final
1	(Russia) Dinara Safina	4	2
5	(Serbia) Jelena Janković	6	6

=== Top half ===
==== Section 1 ====
First round
(Italy) R Vinci	6	6
Q	(Germany) T Malek	4	1
(Spain) MJ Martínez Sánchez	6	3	6
(Russia) V Dushevina	4	6	3
(China) S Peng	6	6
15	(Slovakia) D Cibulková	2	1
12	(France) M Bartoli	4	3
WC	(Belgium) K Clijsters	6	6
(Argentina) G Dulko	4	0
(Switzerland) P Schnyder	6	6
(Czech Republic) L Šafářová	6	7
(Czech Republic) I Benešová	3	6^{7}

Second round
1	(Russia) D Safina	2	7	6
(Italy) R Vinci	6	5	4
(Spain) MJ Martínez Sánchez	7	2	1
(China) S Peng	5	6	6
WC	(Belgium) K Clijsters	6	7
(Switzerland) P Schnyder	2	5
(Czech Republic) L Šafářová	3	7	6^{4}
6	(Russia) S Kuznetsova	6	6^{2}	7

Third round
1	(Russia) D Safina	6	6
(China) S Peng	3	4
WC	(Belgium) K Clijsters	6	4	6
6	(Russia) S Kuznetsova	4	6	2

Quarterfinals
1	(Russia) D Safina	6	7
WC	(Belgium) K Clijsters	2	5

==== Section 2 ====
First round
Q	(Belarus) O Govortsova	6	6
(Russia) E Makarova	1	3
Q	(Poland) U Radwańska	5	5
(Hungary) Á Szávay	7	7
Q	(Japan) A Morita	2	3
14	(Italy) F Pennetta	6	6
10	(Russia) N Petrova	2	3
(Ukraine) A Bondarenko	6	6
(Italy) S Errani	6	3	1
(Slovakia) D Hantuchová	3	6	6
(Russia) A Kleybanova	6	6
(France) A Rezaï	3	3

Second round
3	(United States) V Williams	6	6
Q	(Belarus) O Govortsova	2	2
(Hungary) Á Szávay	2	4
14	(Italy) F Pennetta	6	6
(Ukraine) A Bondarenko	5	6	4
(Slovakia) D Hantuchová	7	1	6
(Russia) A Kleybanova	4	6	5
7	(Russia) V Zvonareva	6	1	7

Third round
3	(United States) V Williams	6^{2}	4
14	(Italy) F Pennetta	7	6
(Slovakia) D Hantuchová	7	0	7
7	(Russia) V Zvonareva	6^{6}	6	6^{5}

Quarterfinals
14	(Italy) F Pennetta	6	6
(Slovakia) D Hantuchová	3	3

=== Bottom half ===
==== Section 3 ====
First round
(Spain) C Suárez Navarro	0	3
(Canada) A Wozniak	6	6
(France) A Cornet	3	2
(Hungary) M Czink	6	6
Q	(United States) M Oudin	6	1	1
11	(Serbia) A Ivanovic	2	6	6
16	(France) V Razzano	3	6	4
(Germany) A-L Grönefeld	6	3	6
WC	(United States) M Shaughnessy	5	5
(Romania) S Cîrstea	7	7
Q	(Belgium) Y Wickmayer	6	6
(Italy) F Schiavone	3	4

Second round
8	(Denmark) C Wozniacki	4	6	6
(Canada) A Wozniak	6	4	4
(Hungary) M Czink	7	7
11	(Serbia) A Ivanovic	6^{6}	5
(Germany) A-L Grönefeld	3	2
(Romania) S Cîrstea	6	6
Q	(Belgium) Y Wickmayer	3	4
4	(Russia) E Dementieva	6	6

Third round
8	(Denmark) C Wozniacki	3
(Hungary) M Czink	0	r
(Romania) S Cîrstea	4	4
4	(Russia) E Dementieva	6	6

Quarterfinals
8	(Denmark) C Wozniacki	2	1
4	(Russia) E Dementieva	6	6

==== Section 4 ====
First round
WC	(Russia) M Kirilenko	6	6
Q	(Kazakhstan) Y Shvedova	4	1
(Russia) E Vesnina	5	3
(Russia) A Chakvetadze	7	6
(Estonia) K Kanepi	3	6^{2}
9	(Belarus) V Azarenka	6	7
13	(Poland) A Radwańska	6	6
(Japan) A Sugiyama	2	1
(Austria) S Bammer	6	4	6
(China) J Zheng	2	6	2
Q	(Ukraine) K Bondarenko	6	6
(Slovakia) M Rybáriková	2	2

Second round
5	(Serbia) J Janković	7	6
WC	(Russia) M Kirilenko	6^{6}	3
(Russia) A Chakvetadze	4	2
9	(Belarus) V Azarenka	6	6
13	(Poland) A Radwańska	0	5
(Austria) S Bammer	6	7
Q	(Ukraine) K Bondarenko	3	2
2	(United States) S Williams	6	6

Third round
5	(Serbia) J Janković	7	7
9	(Belarus) V Azarenka	5	6^{4}
(Austria) S Bammer	7	6
2	(United States) S Williams	5	4

Quarterfinals
5	(Serbia) J Janković	6	6
(Austria) S Bammer	0	3

== Qualifying ==
=== Qualifying seeds ===
1. (Russia) Anastasia Pavlyuchenkova (qualifying competition)
2. (Kazakhstan) Yaroslava Shvedova (qualified)
3. (Belgium) Yanina Wickmayer (qualified)
4. (Italy) Tathiana Garbin (qualifying competition)
5. (Slovakia) Jarmila Groth (first round)
6. (Belarus) Olga Govortsova (qualified)
7. (France) Julie Coin (first round)
8. (Japan) Ayumi Morita (qualified)
9. (Israel) Shahar Pe'er (qualifying competition)
10. (Ukraine) Kateryna Bondarenko (qualified)
11. (Czech Republic) Petra Kvitová (first round)
12. (United States) Melanie Oudin (qualified)
13. (Poland) Urszula Radwańska (qualified)
14. (Romania) Alexandra Dulgheru (first round)
15. (Germany) Tatjana Malek (qualified)
16. (Ukraine) Viktoriya Kutuzova (first round)

=== Qualifiers ===
1. (Germany) Tatjana Malek
2. (Kazakhstan) Yaroslava Shvedova
3. (Belarus) Yanina Wickmayer
4. (Ukraine) Kateryna Bondarenko
5. (United States) Melanie Oudin
6. (Belarus) Olga Govortsova
7. (Poland) Urszula Radwańska
8. (Japan) Ayumi Morita

=== Qualifying draw ===
==== First qualifier ====
First round
1	(Russia) Anastasia Pavlyuchenkova	6	6
(France) Camille Pin	0	3
(United States) Julie Ditty	4	6	2
15	(Germany) Tatjana Malek	6	4	6

Qualifying competition
1	(Russia) Anastasia Pavlyuchenkova	1	2
15	(Germany) Tatjana Malek	6	6

==== Second qualifier ====
First round
2	(Kazakhstan) Yaroslava Shvedova	6	6
(Portugal) Michelle Larcher de Brito	4	2
WC	(United States) Shenay Perry	7^{7}	6
11	(Czech Republic) Petra Kvitová	6^{4}	4

Qualifying competition
2	(Kazakhstan) Yaroslava Shvedova	5
WC	(United States) Shenay Perry	0^{r}

==== Third qualifier ====
First round
3	(Belgium) Yanina Wickmayer	3	7	6
Alt	(Russia) Anastasia Rodionova	6	5	4
(Russia) Alla Kudryavtseva	6	6
14	(Romania) Alexandra Dulgheru	4	3

Qualifying competition
3	(Belgium) Yanina Wickmayer	6	6
(Russia) Alla Kudryavtseva	2	4

==== Fourth qualifier ====
First round
4	(Italy) Tathiana Garbin	0
Alt	(Netherlands) Michaëlla Krajicek	1^{r}
(United States) Bethanie Mattek-Sands	2	4
10	(Ukraine) Kateryna Bondarenko	6	6

Qualifying competition
4	(Italy) Tathiana Garbin	1	0
10	(Ukraine) Kateryna Bondarenko	6	6

==== Fifth qualifier ====
First round
5	(Slovakia) Jarmila Groth	1	2
(United States) Varvara Lepchenko	6	6
WC	(United States) Carly Gullickson	4	1
12	(United States) Melanie Oudin	6	6

Qualifying competition
(United States) Varvara Lepchenko	5	2
12	(United States) Melanie Oudin	7	6

==== Sixth qualifier ====
First round
6	(Belarus) Olga Govortsova	6	6
(Spain) Nuria Llagostera Vives	3	4
(Uzbekistan) Akgul Amanmuradova	2	4
9	(Israel) Shahar Pe'er	6	6

Qualifying competition
6	(Belarus) Olga Govortsova	6	6
9	(Israel) Shahar Pe'er	3	2

==== Seventh qualifier ====
First round
7	(France) Julie Coin	3	6	3
(Kazakhstan) Galina Voskoboeva	6	3	6
WC	(United States) Abigail Spears	6^{3}	2
13	(Poland) Urszula Radwańska	7^{7}	6

Qualifying competition
(Kazakhstan) Galina Voskoboeva	1	1
13	(Poland) Urszula Radwańska	6	6

==== Eighth qualifier ====
First round
8	(Japan) Ayumi Morita	7	6
(United Kingdom) Elena Baltacha	5	2
(United States) Jill Craybas	6	6
16	(Ukraine) Viktoriya Kutuzova	3	0

Qualifying competition
8	(Japan) Ayumi Morita	6	7^{8}
(United States) Jill Craybas	4	6^{6}

== See also ==
- 2009 Western & Southern Financial Group Masters and Women's Open
