= Tracy Lin =

American tennis player

- Full name: Tracy Yen Lin
- Country (sports): United States
- Born: September 26, 1986 (age 39) Anaheim, California, U.S.
- Plays: Right-handed

Singles
- Career record: 0–1

Doubles
- Career record: 1–2

Grand Slam doubles results
- US Open: 2R (2008)

Tracy Yen Lin (born September 26, 1986) is an American former tennis player.

== Biography ==
Lin was born in Anaheim, California and is of Taiwanese descent. Her elder brother Eric played college tennis at UCLA and appeared in the men's doubles main draw of the 1993 US Open. She attended Canyon High School and as a sophomore in 2001 won the CIF Southern Section singles title.

From 2004 to 2008, Lin played for the UCLA Bruins and partnered with Riza Zalameda to win the NCAA doubles championship in her senior year. Lin and Zalameda received a wildcard to the doubles main draw of the 2008 East West Bank Classic, a WTA Tour tournament in Los Angeles. Most notably the pair also competed as wildcards at the 2008 US Open and made the second round, with a win over the Spanish pairing of Carla Suárez Navarro and Arantxa Parra Santonja.
