= 2009 LA Women's Tennis Championships – Singles =

Singles
- 2009 LA Women's Tennis Championships

Final
- Champion: (Italy) Flavia Pennetta
- Runner-up: (Australia) Samantha Stosur
- Score: 6–4, 6–3

Details
- Draw: 56
- Seeds: 16

Events
Singles	Doubles
- LA Women's Tennis Championships

World No. 1 Dinara Safina was the defending champion, but she lost in the third round against Zheng Jie.

Flavia Pennetta won in the final 6–4, 6–3 against Samantha Stosur.

== Seeds ==
The top eight seeds receive a bye into the second round.

1. (Russia) Dinara Safina (third round)
2. (Russia) Vera Zvonareva (quarterfinals)
3. (Belarus) Victoria Azarenka (second round)
4. (Denmark) Caroline Wozniacki (second round)
5. (Russia) Nadia Petrova (third round)
6. (Serbia) Ana Ivanovic (third round)
7. (Slovakia) Dominika Cibulková (second round)
8. (Poland) Agnieszka Radwańska (quarterfinals)
9. (France) Marion Bartoli (withdrew)
10. (Italy) Flavia Pennetta (champion)
11. (France) Virginie Razzano (first round)
12. (China) Li Na (third round, withdrew due to a right knee injury)
13. (Australia) Samantha Stosur (final)
14. (China) Zheng Jie (quarterfinals)
15. (Estonia) Kaia Kanepi (first round)
16. (Italy) Francesca Schiavone (first round)
17. (Germany) Sabine Lisicki (third round, Retired due to a right shoulder injury)

== Main draw ==
Key

- Q = Qualifier
- WC = Wild card
- LL = Lucky loser
- Alt = Alternate
- ITF = ITF entry
- PR = Protected ranking
- SR = Special ranking
- SE = Special exempt
- JE = Junior exempt
- JR = Junior Accelerator Programme entrant
- CO = College Accelerator Programme entrant
- NG = Next Gen Accelerator Program entrant
- w/o = Walkover
- r = Retired
- d = Defaulted

=== Finals ===
Quarterfinals
14	(China) Zheng Jie	6	3	4
13	(Australia) Samantha Stosur	4	6	6
(Romania) Sorana Cîrstea	7	1	7
8	(Poland) Agnieszka Radwańska	6^{4}	6	5
(Poland) Urszula Radwańska	4	5
(Russia) Maria Sharapova	6	7
10	(Italy) Flavia Pennetta	6	6
2	(Russia) Vera Zvonareva	4	2

Semifinals
13	(Australia) Samantha Stosur	6	6
(Romania) Sorana Cîrstea	3	2
(Russia) Maria Sharapova	2	6	3
10	(Italy) Flavia Pennetta	6	4	6

Final
13	(Australia) Samantha Stosur	4	3
10	(Italy) Flavia Pennetta	6	6

=== Top half ===
==== Section 1 ====
First round
Q	(United States) M Oudin	7	2	2
(Slovakia) D Hantuchová	6^{3}	6	6
(Hungary) Á Szávay	1	0
(Russia) E Vesnina	6	6
Q	(Ukraine) O Savchuk	5	6	2
14	(China) J Zheng	7	1	6
13	(Australia) S Stosur	6	6
(Romania) M Niculescu	1	2
Q	(South Africa) C Scheepers	6	3	1
(Russia) M Kirilenko	4	6	6
WC	(United States) V King	6	6
(Austria) S Bammer	3	2

Second round
1	(Russia) D Safina	6	6
(Slovakia) D Hantuchová	2	4
(Russia) E Vesnina	4	6	0
14	(China) J Zheng	6	4	6
13	(Australia) S Stosur	6	6
(Russia) M Kirilenko	2	4
WC	(United States) V King	4	6	1
6	(Serbia) A Ivanovic	6	4	6

Third round
1	(Russia) D Safina	5	6	4
14	(China) J Zheng	7	4	6
13	(Australia) S Stosur	6	6
6	(Serbia) A Ivanovic	3	2

Quarterfinals
14	(China) J Zheng	6	3	4
13	(Australia) S Stosur	4	6	6

==== Section 2 ====
First round
(Romania) S Cîrstea	6	7
WC	(Portugal) M Larcher de Brito	4	5
(Hungary) M Czink	6	4	1
(Russia) E Makarova	3	6	6
Q	(Japan) K Date-Krumm	6^{5}	6	5
17	(Germany) S Lisicki	7	2	7
11	(France) V Razzano	6^{5}	3
(Russia) A Chakvetadze	7	6
(Russia) A Kleybanova	6	6
(Russia) A Kudryavtseva	1	3
Q	(United States) C Gullickson	3	1
(Japan) A Sugiyama	6	6

Second round
4	(Denmark) C Wozniacki	6	4	6^{5}
(Romania) S Cîrstea	1	6	7
(Russia) E Makarova	1	4
17	(Germany) S Lisicki	6	6
(Russia) A Chakvetadze	6	3	6
(Russia) A Kleybanova	3	6	1
(Japan) A Sugiyama	2	1
8	(Poland) A Radwańska	6	6

Third round
(Romania) S Cîrstea	6	1
17	(Germany) S Lisicki	3	0	r
(Russia) A Chakvetadze	3	2
8	(Poland) A Radwańska	6	6

Quarterfinals
(Romania) S Cîrstea	7	1	7
8	(Poland) A Radwańska	6^{4}	6	5

=== Bottom half ===
==== Section 3 ====
First round
(Poland) U Radwańska	6	6
(France) J Coin	1	2
(Canada) A Wozniak	7	7
(United States) B Mattek-Sands	5	5
(Japan) A Morita	0	0	r
12	(China) N Li	6	2
15	(Estonia) K Kanepi	3	6^{4}
(Czech Republic) L Šafářová	6	7
(United States) M Shaughnessy	6	3	3
(Ukraine) A Bondarenko	3	6	6
(Russia) M Sharapova	6	6
(Slovakia) J Groth	0	4

Second round
7	(Slovakia) D Cibulková	4	7	4
(Poland) U Radwańska	6	6^{6}	6
(Canada) A Wozniak	6	4	2
12	(China) N Li	4	6	6
(Czech Republic) L Šafářová	7	4	5
(Ukraine) A Bondarenko	5	6	7
(Russia) M Sharapova	6^{4}	6	6
3	(Belarus) V Azarenka	7	4	2

Third round
(Poland) U Radwańska	w/o
12	(China) N Li
(Ukraine) A Bondarenko	6	0	3
(Russia) M Sharapova	4	6	6

Quarterfinals
(Poland) U Radwańska	4	5
(Russia) M Sharapova	6	7

==== Section 4 ====
First round
(Israel) S Pe'er	7	4
Q	(Russia) A Rodionova	5	1	r
(Italy) T Garbin	4	4
WC	(United States) C Vandeweghe	6	6
LL	(United States) V Lepchenko	2	7	0
10	(Italy) F Pennetta	6	5	6
16	(Italy) F Schiavone	6^{7}	2
Q	(United States) J Craybas	7	6
(Belgium) Y Wickmayer	6	6
(Czech Republic) N Vaidišová	1	1
Q	(Netherlands) M Krajicek	3	7	3
(China) S Peng	6	6^{4}	6

Second round
5	(Russia) N Petrova	6	2	6
(Israel) S Pe'er	4	6	3
WC	(United States) C Vandeweghe	2	4
10	(Italy) F Pennetta	6	6
Q	(United States) J Craybas	6^{2}	1
(Belgium) Y Wickmayer	7	6
(China) S Peng	6	3	6^{6}
2	(Russia) V Zvonareva	3	6	7

Third round
5	(Russia) N Petrova	3	3
10	(Italy) F Pennetta	6	6
(Belgium) Y Wickmayer	6^{5}	6	4
2	(Russia) V Zvonareva	7	4	6

Quarterfinals
10	(Italy) F Pennetta	6	6
2	(Russia) V Zvonareva	4	2
