= 2008 US Open Series =

== 2008 Series results ==
To be included in the standings and subsequently the bonus prize money, a player has to have countable results from two different tournaments. Players finishing in the top three in the series can earn up to $1 million in extra prize money. Roger Federer received the largest US Open pay day of $2.4 million in 2007 after capturing the title in both the US Open Series and the US Open championship. In 2008, the men's series leader Rafael Nadal received US$570,000 for his semifinal finish with a bonus of US$250,000. Women's leader Dinara Safina received US$570,000 for her semifinal finish as well.

=== Men ===
US Open Series results
A	did not participate in the tournament	#R	lost in the early rounds of the tournament
QF	advanced to but not past the quarterfinals	SF	advanced to but not past the semifinals
F	advanced to the finals, tournament runner-up	W	won the tournament

	Player (ATP Tour)	Points	US Open Result
1	(Spain) Rafael Nadal^{1}	145	SF
2	(United Kingdom) Andy Murray	145	F
3	(Argentina) Juan Martín del Potro	140	QF
4	(France) Gilles Simon	115	3R
T5	(Croatia) Marin Čilić	95	3R
T5	(Serbia) Novak Djokovic	95	SF
T7	(United States) Andy Roddick	75	QF
T7	(Russia) Dmitry Tursunov	75	3R
9	(United States) Mardy Fish	70	QF
10	(United States) James Blake	65	3R
11	(Germany) Tommy Haas	55	2R
12	(Russia) Igor Andreev	45	4R
13	(Spain) Fernando Verdasco	40	3R
T14	(Italy) Andreas Seppi	30	3R
T14	(Sweden) Robin Söderling	30	1R

- 1 - Rafael Nadal won the series instead of Andy Murray because Nadal defeated Murray in Canada.

=== Women ===
	Player (WTA Tour)	Points	US Open Result
1	(Russia) Dinara Safina	170	SF
2	(France) Marion Bartoli	105	4R
3	(Slovakia) Dominika Cibulková	85	3R
4	(Russia) Anna Chakvetadze	75	1R
5	(Belarus) Victoria Azarenka	60	3R
6	(Japan) Ai Sugiyama	50	3R
T7	(Russia) Nadia Petrova	30	3R
T7	(Switzerland) Patty Schnyder	30	QF
