= 2009 LA Women's Tennis Championships =

- Date: August 3–9
- Edition: 36th
- Category: Premier Series
- Draw: 56S / 16D
- Prize money: $700,000
- Surface: Hard / outdoor
- Location: Carson, California, U.S.
- Venue: Home Depot Center

Champions

Singles
- (Italy) Flavia Pennetta

Doubles
- (Chinese Taipei) Chuang Chia-jung / (China) Yan Zi
- WTA Los Angeles

The 2009 LA Women's Tennis Championships was a women's tennis tournament played on outdoor hard courts. It was the 36th and last edition of the LA Women's Tennis Championships, and was part of the Premier Series of the 2009 WTA Tour. It was held at the Home Depot Center in Carson, California, near Los Angeles, United States, from August 3 through August 9, 2009. It was the second women's event on the 2009 US Open Series. Tenth-seeded Flavia Pennetta won the singles title.

== Finals ==
=== Singles ===
(Italy) Flavia Pennetta defeated (Australia) Samantha Stosur 6–4, 6–3

- It was Pennetta's second title of the year and eighth overall.

=== Doubles ===
(Chinese Taipei) Chuang Chia-jung / (China) Yan Zi defeated (Russia) Maria Kirilenko / (Poland) Agnieszka Radwańska 6–0, 4–6, [10–7]

== Entrants ==
=== Seeds ===
Player	WTA Tour Rank^{*}	Seeds
(Russia) Dinara Safina	1	1
(Russia) Vera Zvonareva	7	2
(Belarus) Victoria Azarenka	8	3
(Denmark) Caroline Wozniacki	9	4
(Russia) Nadia Petrova	10	5
(Serbia) Ana Ivanovic	11	6
(Slovakia) Dominika Cibulková	12	7
(Poland) Agnieszka Radwańska	13	8
(France) Marion Bartoli	14	9
(Italy) Flavia Pennetta	15	10
(France) Virginie Razzano	17	11
(China) Li Na	18	12
(Australia) Samantha Stosur	20	13
(China) Zheng Jie	22	14
(Estonia) Kaia Kanepi	23	15
(Italy) Francesca Schiavone	24	16
(Germany) Sabine Lisicki	25	17

- Seedings are based on the rankings of July 27, 2009.
- Maria Bartoli withdrew, so Sabine Lisicki became the No. 17 seed.

=== Other entrants ===
The following players received wildcards into the singles main draw

- (United States) Vania King
- (United States) CoCo Vandeweghe
- (Portugal) Michelle Larcher de Brito

The following players received entry from the qualifying draw:

- (United States) Jill Craybas
- (United States) Melanie Oudin
- (South Africa) Chanelle Scheepers
- (Netherlands) Michaëlla Krajicek
- (United States) Carly Gullickson
- (Ukraine) Olga Savchuk
- (Russia) Anastasia Rodionova
- (Japan) Kimiko Date-Krumm

The following player received the lucky loser spot:

- (United States) Varvara Lepchenko

Preceded by Stanford	2009 US Open Series; Women's Events	Succeeded by Cincinnati
