= 2008 East West Bank Classic =

- Date: July 21–27
- Edition: 35th
- Category: Tier II Series
- Draw: 56S / 16D
- Prize money: $600,000
- Surface: Hard / outdoor
- Location: Carson, California, U.S.
- Venue: Home Depot Center

Champions

Singles
- (Russia) Dinara Safina

Doubles
- (Chinese Taipei) Yung-jan Chan / (Chinese Taipei) Chia-jung Chuang
← 2007 ·	WTA Los Angeles	· 2009 →

The 2008 East West Bank Classic was a women's tennis tournament played on outdoor hard courts. It was the 35th edition of the East West Bank Classic, and was part of the Tier II Series of the 2008 WTA Tour. It took place at the Home Depot Center in Carson, California, near Los Angeles, United States, from July 21 through July 27, 2008. Fourth-seeded Dinara Safina won the singles title and earned $95,500 first-prize money

== Finals ==
=== Singles ===
(Russia) Dinara Safina defeated (Italy) Flavia Pennetta, 6–4, 6–2

- It was Dinara Safina's 2nd title of the year, and her 7th overall.

=== Doubles ===
(Chinese Taipei) Yung-jan Chan / (Chinese Taipei) Chia-jung Chuang defeated (Czech Republic) Eva Hrdinová / (Czech Republic) Vladimíra Uhlířová, 2–6, 7–5, [10–4]
