= Elena Dementieva =

Russian tennis player (born 1981)

Elena Dementieva Елена Дементьева
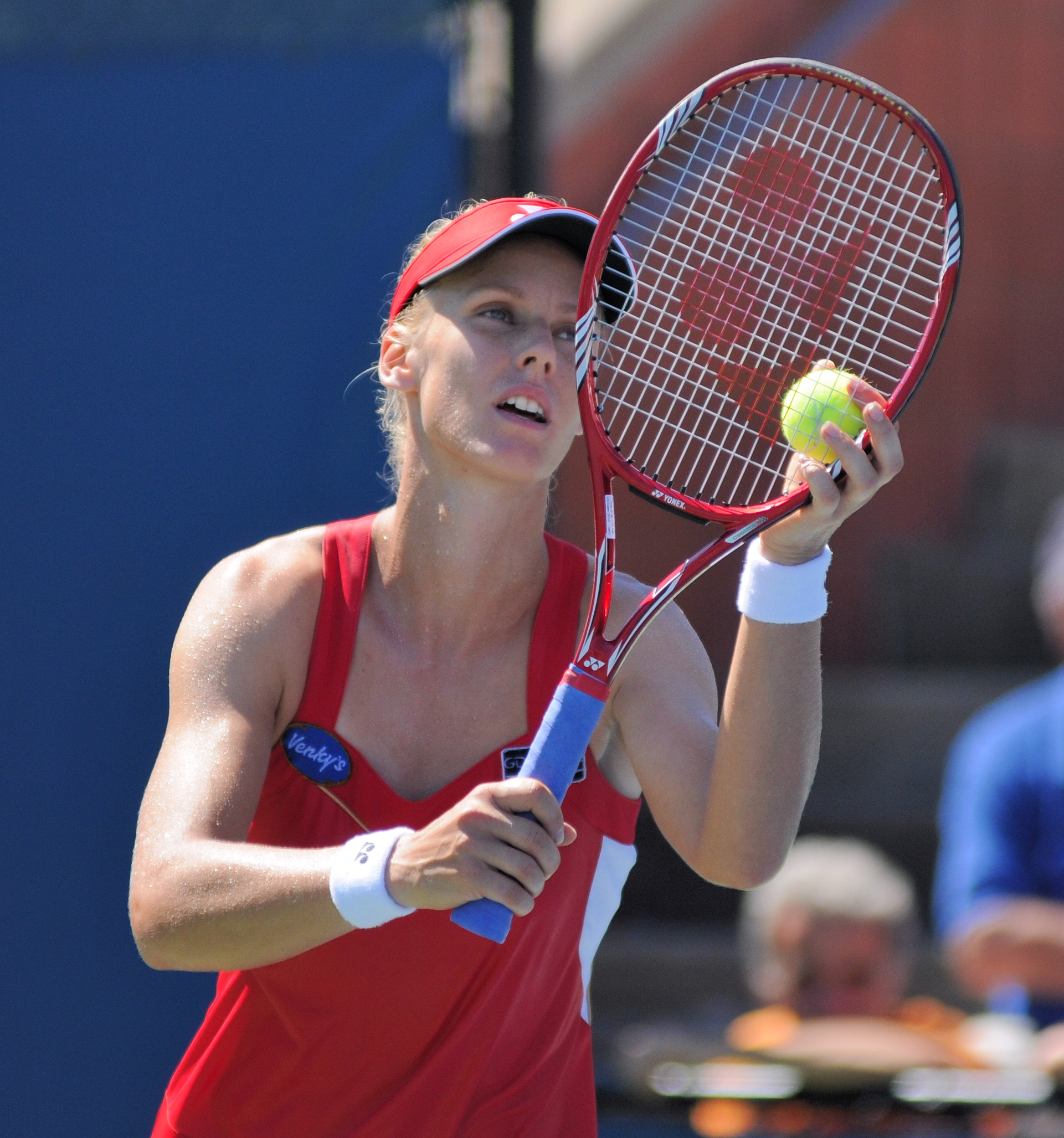
- Dementieva at the 2010 US Open
- Country (sports): Russia
- Residence: Monte Carlo, Monaco
- Born: 15 October 1981 (age 44) Moscow, Russian SFSR, Soviet Union
- Height: 1.80 m (5 ft 11 in)
- Turned pro: 1998
- Retired: 2010
- Plays: Right-handed (two-handed backhand)
- Prize money: $14,867,437: 42nd in all-time rankings

Singles
- Career record: 576–273
- Career titles: 16
- Highest ranking: No. 3 (6 April 2009)

Grand Slam singles results
- Australian Open: SF (2009)
- French Open: F (2004)
- Wimbledon: SF (2008, 2009)
- US Open: F (2004)

Other tournaments
- Tour Finals: SF (2000, 2008)
- Olympic Games: W (2008)

Doubles
- Career record: 152–86
- Career titles: 6
- Highest ranking: No. 5 (14 April 2003)

Grand Slam doubles results
- Australian Open: 3R (2005, 2006, 2007)
- French Open: 3R (2004)
- Wimbledon: SF (2003)
- US Open: F (2002, 2005)

Other doubles tournaments
- Tour Finals: W (2002)
- Olympic Games: 1R (2004)

Mixed doubles
- Career record: 1–1

Grand Slam mixed doubles results
- Australian Open: QF (2004)
Medal record
Olympic Games
Gold medal – first place	2008 Beijing	Singles
Silver medal – second place	2000 Sydney	Singles

Elena Viacheslavovna Dementieva (Russian: Еле́на Вячесла́вовна Деме́нтьева, [jɪˈlʲɛnə dʲɪˈmʲenʲtʲjɪvə]; born 15 October 1981) is a Russian former professional tennis player. She was ranked world No. 3 in women's singles and world No. 5 in women's doubles by the WTA. Dementieva won 16 WTA Tour-level singles titles, including an Olympic gold medal at the 2008 Beijing Olympics, adding to a silver medal from the 2000 Sydney Olympics. She was also the runner-up at the 2004 French Open and 2004 US Open, and reached seven other major semifinals. Dementieva was part of the victorious Russian team at the 2005 Fed Cup. In doubles, she won six titles, including the 2002 WTA Championships with Janette Husárová, and was runner-up in two US Open finals.

Dementieva announced her retirement from the sport after the 2010 WTA Tour Championships. Between 2003 and 2010, she only ended one year, in 2007, outside the top 10. She is considered to be one of the most talented players never to have won a Grand Slam tournament.

== Early and personal life ==
Dementieva was born in Moscow to Viatcheslav, an electrical engineer, and Vera, a teacher—both recreational tennis players. She was rejected by Dynamo Sports Club and the Central Red Army Tennis Club at the age of seven, before enrolling at Spartak Tennis Club, where she was coached for three years by Rauza Islanova, the mother of Marat Safin and Dinara Safina. She then moved to the Central Red Army Club with Sergei Pashkov, when she was eleven. She was later coached by her mother Vera and her older brother Vsevolod. She has homes in Monte Carlo, Monaco; Moscow, Russia; and Boca Raton, Florida, United States. On 16 July 2011, Dementieva married hockey player Maxim Afinogenov in Moscow. The couple welcomed their first child, Veronika, in April 2014. Their second child, a boy named Sergey, was born in May 2016.

== Tennis career ==
Dementieva played and won her first international tournament, Les Petits As in France at the age of 13. In 1997, she entered the WTA top 500. She turned professional in 1998 and entered the top 100 in 1999.

=== 1999–2002: Professional debut ===
In 1999, Dementieva represented Russia in the Fed Cup final against the United States, scoring Russia's only point when she upset Venus Williams 1–6, 6–3, 7–6, recovering from a 4–1 third set deficit. She played her first Grand Slam main draws, qualifying for the Australian Open, French Open and Wimbledon, along with receiving a direct entry into the US Open. She reached the second round at the Australian Open and French Open, made a first-round exit at Wimbledon and reached the third round of the US Open. In 2000, she entered the top 20 by winning more than 40 singles matches for the second straight year and earned more than $600,000. She became the first woman from Russia to reach the US Open semifinals in singles, where she lost to Lindsay Davenport. At the 2000 Summer Olympics in Sydney, Dementieva won the silver medal, losing to Venus Williams in the final. In 2000, Dementieva was named the WTA Tour's Most Improved Player.

2001 was the second straight year in which Dementieva finished in the WTA's top 20. During the year, she became the top-ranked Russian player, a position previously held by Anna Kournikova since December 1997. Dementieva, however, suffered a shoulder injury in Australia. To keep playing matches, she altered her serve, adding slice and changing her motion. After her shoulder healed, her service motion stayed the same. She had double faulted as many as 19 times in a match and hit 50 mph first and second serves. In 2002, Dementieva and her partner Janette Husárová reached the final of the US Open and won the year-ending WTA Tour Championships. In singles, Dementieva defeated a top ranked player for the first time, beating world No. 1 Martina Hingis 6–2, 6–2 in the quarterfinals in Moscow. Dementieva reached the final of that tournament, losing to Jelena Dokić.

=== 2003: Top ten debut ===
Dementieva played the most tournaments among year-end top 10 players (27) and won $869,740 in prize money. At the Bausch & Lomb Championships in Amelia Island, she won her first WTA Tour title, defeating Amanda Coetzer, world No. 9, Daniela Hantuchová, world No. 4, Justine Henin and world No. 5, Lindsay Davenport. Dementieva was the lowest seed (10th) to win the tournament in its 24-year history. She also won back-to-back titles in Bali and Shanghai, defeating Chanda Rubin in both finals. Dementieva finished the year in the top 10 for the first time (world No. 8). In addition, she reached the semifinals of the Wimbledon doubles with compatriot Lina Krasnoroutskaya, beating the Venus and Serena Williams team along the way.

=== 2004: Two Grand Slam finals ===
Dementieva's breakthrough year was 2004. In Miami, she defeated Venus Williams in the quarterfinals and Nadia Petrova in the semifinals. Dementieva then lost to the top-seeded and two-time defending champion Serena Williams 1–6, 1–6. On 5 April, she reached her highest singles ranking at sixth in the world.

In May at the French Open, Dementieva reached her first Grand Slam final, defeating former top ranked Lindsay Davenport in the fourth round, Amélie Mauresmo in the quarterfinals and Paola Suárez in the semifinals, all in straight sets. Dementieva lost to compatriot Myskina in the first all-Russian Grand Slam final, 1–6, 2–6. In the match, Dementieva had ten double faults as her serve disintegrated. She summed up her performance by saying: "I just don't know how to serve".

Later that year at the US Open, after first round losses at Wimbledon to Sandra Kleinová and the Summer Olympics to eventual bronze-medalist Alicia Molik, Dementieva reached her second Grand Slam final, defeating Mauresmo and Jennifer Capriati en route, both in third set tie-breaks. Svetlana Kuznetsova defeated Dementieva in straight sets in the final, becoming the third consecutive Russian Grand Slam winner Following the US Open, Dementieva won her first title in Hasselt and reached the Kremlin Cup final for the second time, losing to Myskina.

=== 2005–2006: Continued good form ===
In 2005, Dementieva reached six semifinals, the most important being at the US Open. She also reached the final in Charleston, losing to Justine Henin, and Philadelphia, losing to Amélie Mauresmo despite serving for the match at 5–4 in the third set. In the quarterfinals of the US Open, Dementieva defeated top ranked Lindsay Davenport for her second victory over a current No. 1 player. In the semifinals, she was beaten by Mary Pierce. Partnering Flavia Pennetta, Dementieva reached her second doubles final at the US Open.

Following the US Open, Dementieva helped Russia repeat as Fed Cup champions, beating France 3–2 in the final. All three points came from Dementieva, as she avenged her loss to Pierce at the US Open, beat Mauresmo, and then won the deciding doubles match with partner Dinara Safina. At the WTA Tour Championships, Dementieva lost all three round robin matches against Mauresmo, Pierce, and Kim Clijsters with the same score each time: 2–6, 3–6.

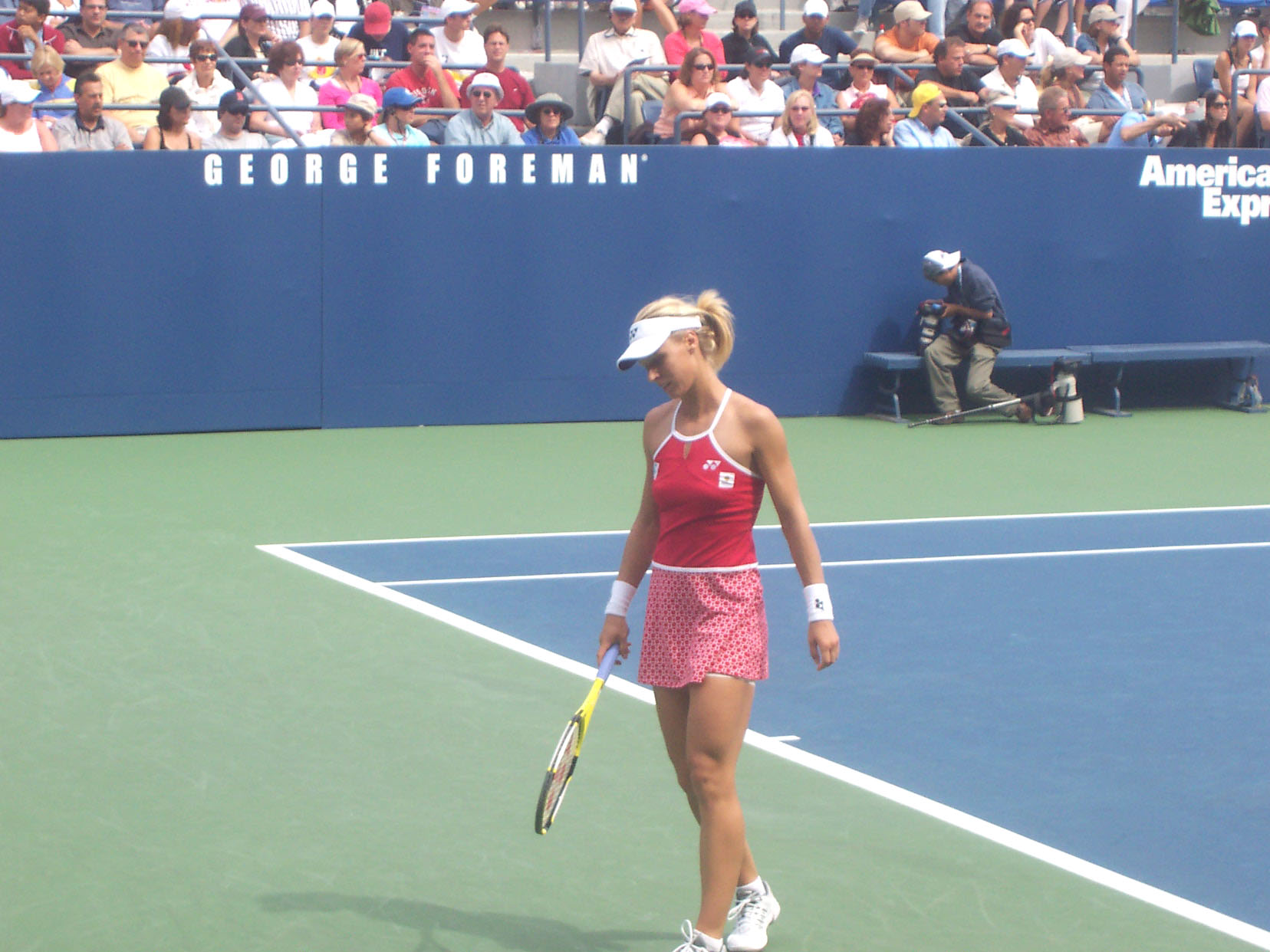
Dementieva playing the first round of the 2006 US Open

After losing to Kim Clijsters in an exhibition in Hong Kong, she lost in the first round of the Australian Open to Julia Schruff. But immediately following that tournament, Dementieva won her first Tier I event, the Pan Pacific Open in Tokyo. On the run to the title, she defeated Katarina Srebotnik, Nicole Vaidišová, and Anastasia Myskina, all in three sets. She then defeated the resurgent Martina Hingis. At the Indian Wells Open, despite double faulting 79 times in six matches, Dementieva reached the final. She defeated Sania Mirza, Ana Ivanovic, and Li Na along the way. Dementieva then upset Justine Henin in a semifinal 2–6, 7–5, 7–5. The victory was her fourth three set match of the tournament, and fatigue contributed to her 1–6, 2–6 loss to Maria Sharapova in the final.

At the French Open she was upset in the third round by Shahar Pe'er 6–4, 7–5. On grass, Dementieva reached the Hertogenbosch semifinals, losing to Michaëlla Krajicek despite holding a match point. Dementieva then reached her first Wimbledon quarterfinal before losing to fourth seeded Sharapova. In August, Dementieva won the tournament in Los Angeles by defeating Jelena Janković in the final in three sets.

At the US Open, Dementieva reached the quarterfinals for the fourth time, losing to Janković in straight sets. The three games she won were all breaks of serve. Dementieva remarked afterwards, "Yeah, it is disappointing, you know. I'm getting older, and I haven't won a Grand Slam, so that's really what I'm thinking about all the time. I feel like I was in a good shape here. That's why it's sad".. Dementieva qualified for the year-ending WTA Championships for the seventh straight time. She lost to all three players in her round-robin group: Sharapova 1–6, 4–6; Svetlana Kuznetsova 5–7, 3–6; and Clijsters 4–6, 0–6. Her career win–loss record at this tournament fell to 3–14. She had lost her last nine matches played there.

=== 2007: Dropping out of the top 10 ===
Dementieva won two titles, reached three semifinals and five quarterfinals, and reached the fourth round at the Australian Open. After her first semifinal of the year at the Tier I Pan Pacific Open in Tokyo, Dementieva suffered a rib fracture in Antwerp and was off the tour for nine weeks, leaving the top 10 in April for the first time in nearly four years. At the J&S Cup in Warsaw, she lost to Venus Williams. Dementieva won her fourth event back on tour at the Tier III event in Istanbul, her first career singles title on red clay. She was upset in the third round of the French Open by Marion Bartoli the following week. Three weeks later, she lost to Bartoli again in the quarterfinals of the tournament in Eastbourne, East Sussex 1–6, 0–6. She lost in the third round of Wimbledon to Tamira Paszek in three sets. During the North American summer hard-court season, she reached the semifinals of the tournaments in San Diego and New Haven and the quarterfinals of the tournament in Los Angeles, but lost early at the Tier I Rogers Cup in Toronto and at the US Open. By the end of the summer, Dementieva had fallen to world No. 20, her lowest ranking since 2002.

In the fall, Dementieva reached two successive quarterfinals in Beijing and Stuttgart. At the latter event, Dementieva defeated Amélie Mauresmo and Daniela Hantuchová before losing to world No. 1 Justine Henin in the quarterfinals. In the final of the Tier I Kremlin Cup in Moscow, Dementieva, being unseeded, defeated Serena Williams for the first time in her career. Winning the title in Moscow returned Dementieva to the top 10 at world No. 10 for one week. Her first-round loss at the Zurich Open the following week, however, caused her ranking to fall to world No. 11. 2007 was the first year since 2002 that Dementieva did not finish the year in the top 10 and the first year since 1999 that she did not secure a spot at the year-end Tour Championships.

=== 2008: Resurgence, deep runs into Slams, and Olympic gold medal ===
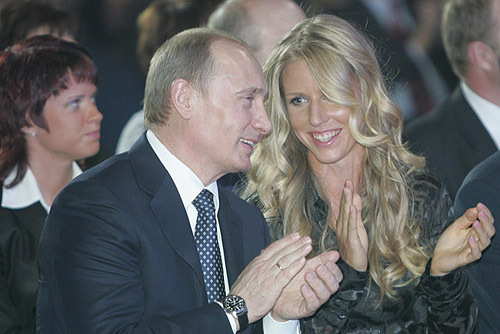
Vladimir Putin and Dementyeva

At Dementieva's first tournament of the season, the Sydney International, she lost in the first round to Sofia Arvidsson. She then reached the fourth round of the Australian Open before losing to eventual champion Maria Sharapova. Dementieva then travelled to Paris for the Tier II Open Gaz de France indoor tournament. She reached the semifinals before succumbing to seventh-seeded Ágnes Szávay from Hungary. Dementieva then won the Tier II, $1.5 million Dubai Tennis Championships, defeating second-seeded compatriot Svetlana Kuznetsova in the final. This was Dementieva's fourth career Tier II tournament title but her first since 2006. Along the way, she defeated Patty Schnyder, Alona Bondarenko, world No. 2, Ana Ivanovic, and Francesca Schiavone (who defeated world No. 1 and defending champion Justine Henin in the quarterfinals).

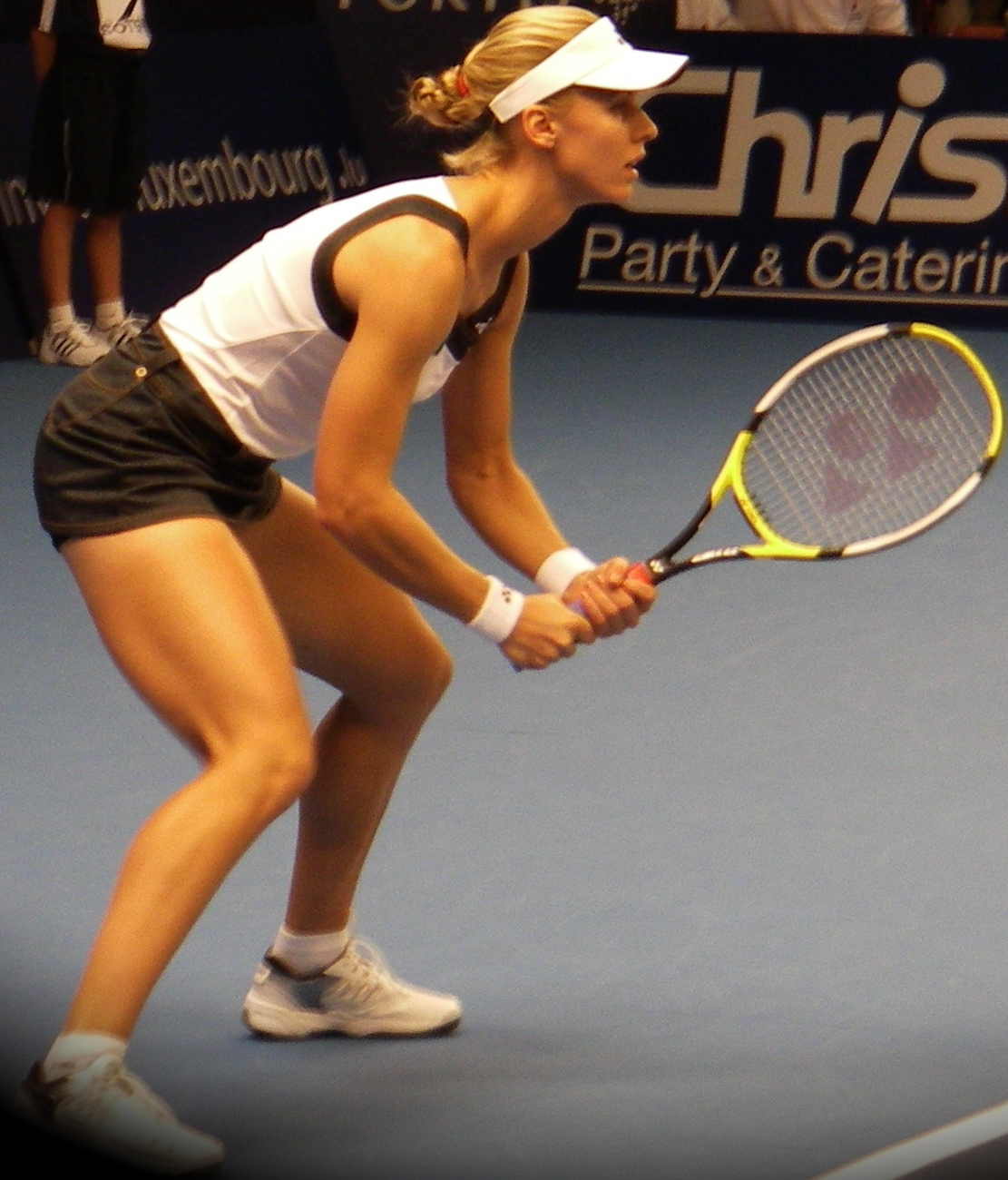
Dementieva at the 2008 Luxembourg Open

At the Tier I Miami Open in Key Biscayne, Dementieva lost in the quarterfinals to Jelena Janković. This caused her ranking to rise to world No. 8. At the Tier I Family Circle Cup in Charleston, Dementieva lost in the semifinals to compatriot Vera Zvonareva dropping her ranking to world No. 9. Dementieva was the seventh-seeded player at the Tier I German Open in Berlin but reached the final, where she lost to 13th-seeded Dinara Safina. Dementieva defeated fourth-seeded Janković in the quarterfinals and second-seeded Ivanovic in the semifinals.

Dementieva's next tournament was the İstanbul Cup, where Dementieva was the top seed and defending champion. She reached the final but was unsuccessful in her attempt to win a singles title at the same tournament in consecutive years, which would have been a career first. Agnieszka Radwańska of Poland defeated Dementieva in the final. At the French Open, Dementieva defeated 11th-seeded Zvonareva in the fourth round, but lost her quarterfinal match against Safina.

At the grass-court Rosmalen Open, she was the top-seeded player but lost in the semifinals to Safina. Dementieva was seeded fifth at the Wimbledon. In the fourth round, she defeated Israeli Shahar Pe'er to become the highest seeded woman left in the draw. In the quarterfinals, Dementieva held on to defeat compatriot Nadia Petrova after Dementieva failed to hold serve while serving for the match in the second set at 5–1 and 5–3. In her first Wimbledon semifinal and her first Grand Slam semifinal since the 2005 US Open, Dementieva lost to eventual champion Venus Williams.

Dementieva played three hardcourt tournaments during the summer and was seeded fifth at all three. She began her summer season by losing to Dominika Cibulková in the second round of the Tier I Rogers Cup in Montreal. At the Beijing Olympics, Dementieva was down a set and a break before defeating fourth-seeded Serena Williams in the quarterfinals. She then defeated compatriot Zvonareva in the semifinals and Safina in the three set final to win the gold medal.

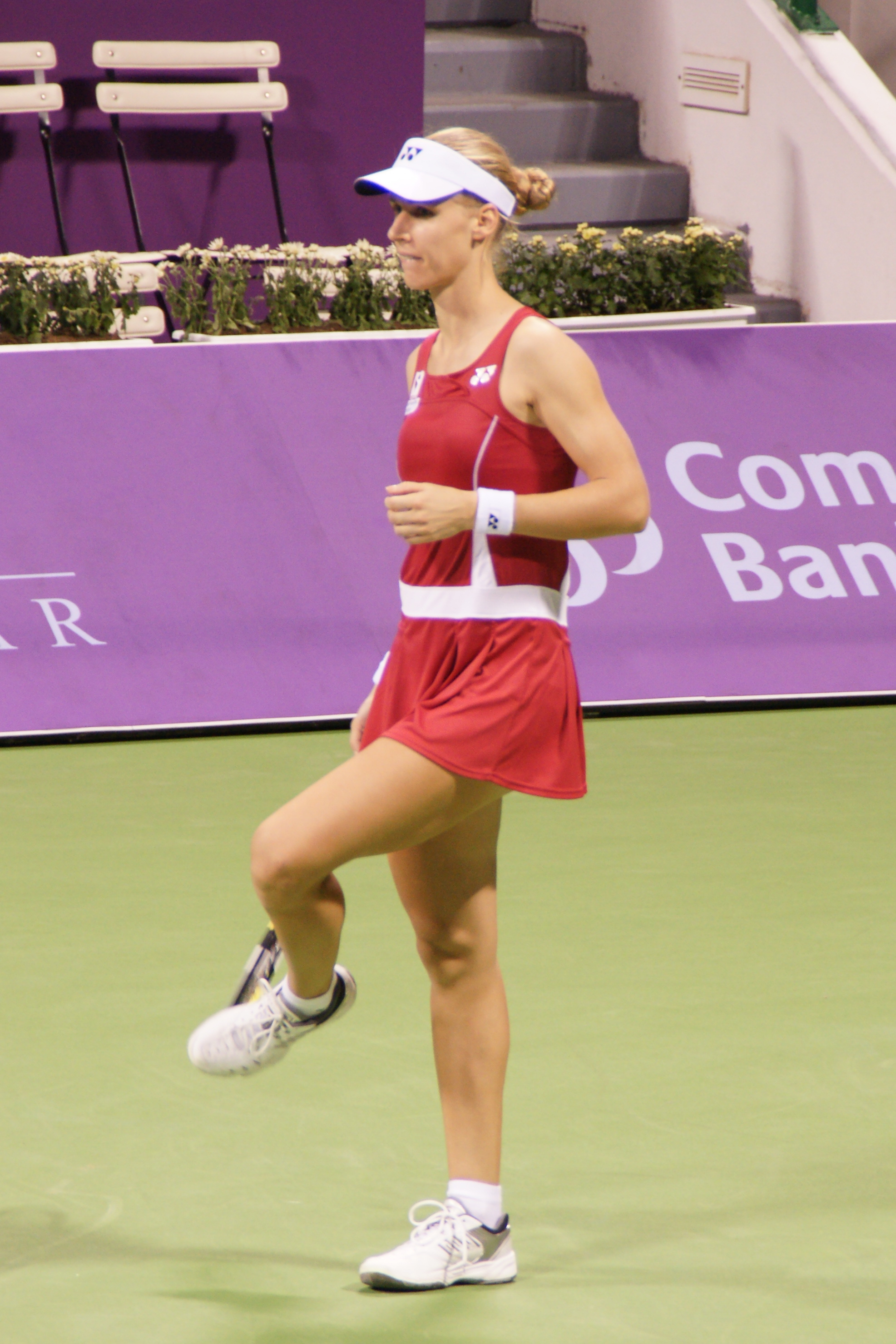
Dementieva at the 2008 WTA Tour Championships

At the US Open, Dementieva was one of six players with the opportunity to be ranked world No. 1 upon completion of the tournament. Dementieva defeated Schnyder in the quarterfinals but lost to Janković in the semifinals. Dementieva was up a break in each set but committed 42 unforced errors and lost each of her last five service games. Nevertheless, her ranking improved to world No. 4 for the first time since 2004.

At the Pan Pacific Open in Tokyo, Dementieva was seeded third and qualified for the year-ending WTA Championships with a second-round victory against Alizé Cornet. However, she was upset in the quarterfinals by Katarina Srebotnik. At the Tier II Porsche Grand Prix in Stuttgart, Dementieva was seeded fourth. She won her first match by defeating Sybille Bammer, but was upset in the quarterfinals by Victoria Azarenka. Defending her title at the Kremlin Cup, Dementieva was seeded third. She defeated Srebotnik in the second round and Nadia Petrova in the quarterfinals. In the semifinals, she faced Jelena Janković. She won the first set easily 6–0, but only managed to win one game after that, losing the next two sets. She committed 31 unforced errors in the second and third set. She won her next event, the Luxembourg Open, defeating Caroline Wozniacki in three sets in the final.

At the WTA Tour Championships held in Doha, Qatar, Dementieva was seeded fourth. In her first round robin match, she lost her first match to Venus Williams, before defeating Dinara Safina in the second. After Serena Williams withdrew from the tournament, Dementieva played Nadia Petrova and defeated her to reach the knock-out stage. In the semifinals, she lost to Vera Zvonareva in three sets.

=== 2009: Two Slam semifinals, career-high No. 3 ranking ===
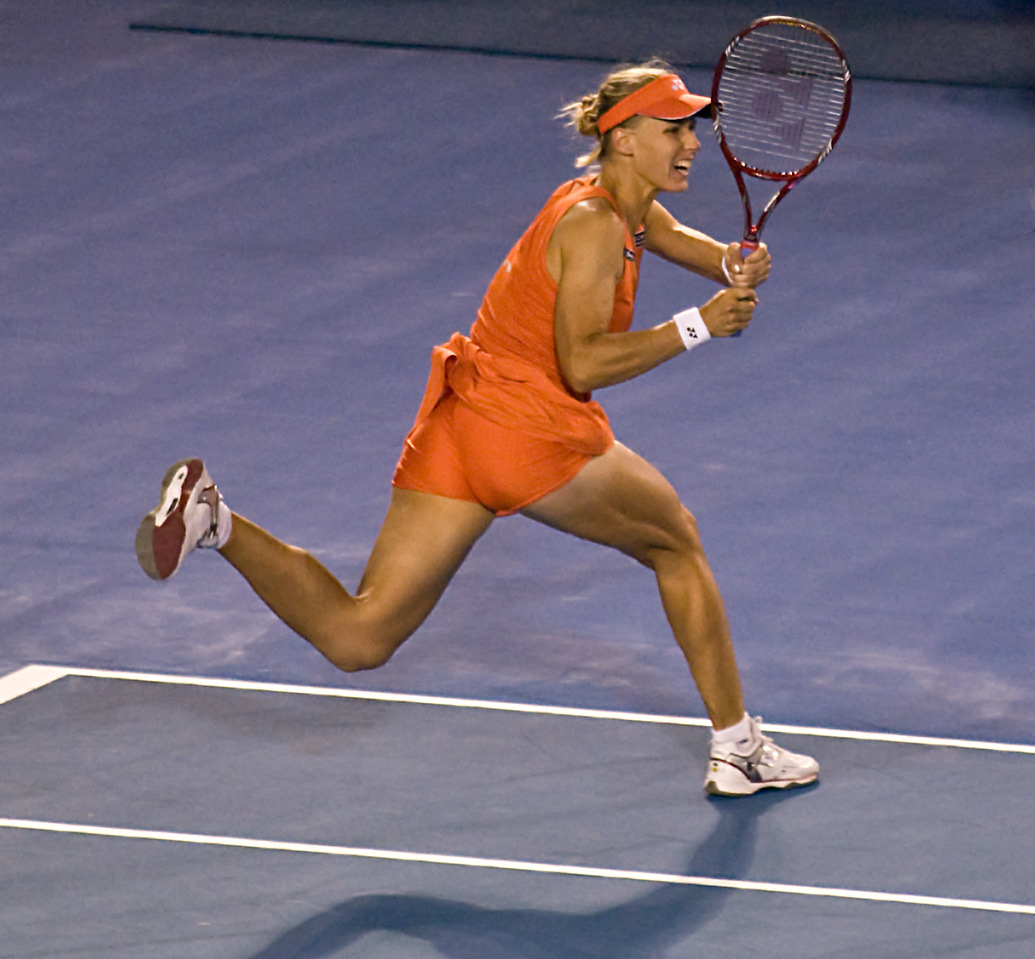
Dementieva at the 2009 Australian Open

Dementieva began her season by winning the Auckland Open. Seeded first, she reached the final where she defeated unseeded Elena Vesnina in the final in straight sets. The following week at the Sydney International, Dementieva defeated Agnieszka Radwańska in the quarterfinals and upset top-seeded Serena Williams in the semifinals in two sets. She then won her second consecutive tournament by defeating compatriot and second-seeded Dinara Safina in the final.

Dementieva was seeded fourth at the Australian Open and was one of three players who had a chance of being ranked world No. 1 at the end of the tournament. Dementieva's 15-match winning streak ended in the semifinals when she lost to Serena Williams in two straight sets after Dementieva had led 3–0 in the second set.

Playing for Russia in Fed Cup in Moscow, Dementieva defeated Zhang Shuai, helping Russia to a 5–0 win over the Chinese.

At the Open GdF Suez tournament in Paris, Dementieva advanced to her third final of the year. Amélie Mauresmo then defeated Dementieva in the final in three sets. At the Premier 5 Dubai Championships, she lost to Venus Williams in the quarterfinals.

Dementieva's next tournament was the Indian Wells Open, which was the first Premier Mandatory event of the year. After receiving a bye in the first round, she was upset by Petra Cetkovská. At the Miami Open, another Premier Mandatory event, Dementieva was seeded fourth but committed 45 unforced errors, while losing to 13th seeded Caroline Wozniacki in the fourth round. Despite the loss, she achieved her highest career singles ranking of world No. 3. By reaching the top 3, she became the sixth Russian to do so.

Dementieva began the spring clay-court season at the Family Circle Cup in Charleston, a Premier event. She lost there in the semifinals Wozniacki in a nearly three-hour match. Dementieva survived a 2–5 deficit in the second set and saved three consecutive match points on her own serve at 3–5 in that set. At the Porsche Tennis Grand Prix, another Premier event, she reached her second consecutive semifinal where she lost to the eventual champion Svetlana Kuznetsova. Dementieva was seeded third for the Madrid Open but was upset by former world No. 1, Amélie Mauresmo, in the third round. At the French Open, Dementieva lost to Samantha Stosur in the third round.

Dementieva at the 2009 Cincinnati Open

As preparation for Wimbledon, Dementieva took part at the Eastbourne International. Seeded top, she was upset in the second round by the eventual finalist Virginie Razzano. Seeded fourth at Wimbledon, Dementieva easily reached the semifinal dropping only 20 games en route. In her second consecutive Wimbledon semifinal, Dementieva played against the No. 2 seed and eventual champion Serena Williams. Dementieva held a single match point at 5–4 in the third set but eventually lost the match 7–6, 5–7, 6–8 in what was at the time the longest Wimbledon semifinal of the Open era.

In the lead up to the US Open, Dementieva took part in three tournaments. At the Stanford Classic, she advanced to the semifinal defeating Daniela Hantuchová en route, but then was crushed by Venus Williams, 6–0, 6–1. At the Cincinnati Open, she defeated Yanina Wickmayer and Caroline Wozniacki to reach the semifinal. In a bizarre match, Dementieva fell to Jelena Janković, despite leading 6–2 in the final set tiebreak having already saved three match points herself prior. At the Rogers Cup in Toronto, Dementieva defeated Serena Williams to reach her fourth final of the year. In the final, she defeated an unseeded Maria Sharapova to win her third title of the year and 14th of her career. As a result of her performances in these three tournaments, Dementieva secured the US Open Series crown. Entering the US Open as one of the favourites, Dementieva suffered a shock loss to the world No. 70, Melanie Oudin.

In 2009 after the US Open, Elena was awarded the Order of Honour by the Russian president Dmitry Medvedev at the Kremlin in Moscow. The Order of Honor is awarded to Russian citizens for high achievement.

On 14 September, Dementieva became one of eight women to qualify for the Tour Championships in Doha. At the Premier 5 Pan Pacific Open, she lost in the second round to Kateryna Bondarenko. Dementieva's next tournament was the Premier Mandatory China Open. She defeated Li Na on her way to the quarterfinals before losing in straight sets to Agnieszka Radwańska.

At the year-ending WTA Championships, Dementieva won her first round-robin match in the Maroon group against Venus after trailing 3–6, 1–3 in the second set. She then suffered two consecutive losses, to Serena in her second round-robin match by 2–6, 4–6, then to Svetlana Kuznetsova, by 3–6, 2–6. Because of this, she failed to reach to the semifinals.

Dementieva finished 2009 as the world No. 5, one spot lower from 2008 year end ranking. The highlights of her career this year included winning Auckland, Sydney and Toronto and reaching the semifinals at the Australian Open and Wimbledon.

=== 2010: Final year ===
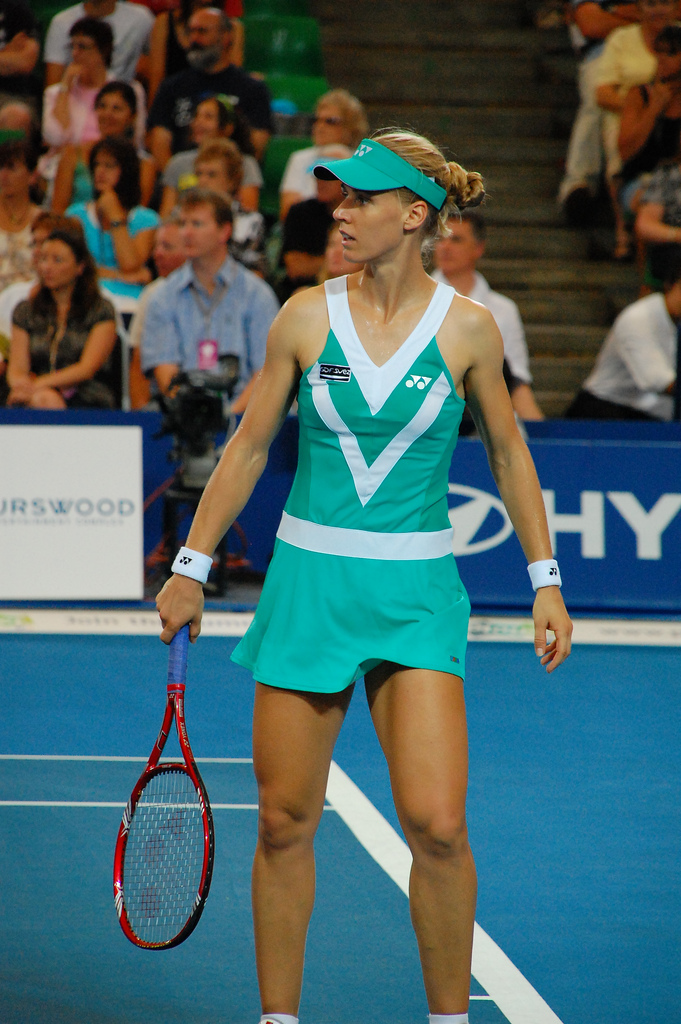
Dementieva at the 2010 Hopman Cup

Dementieva began the year representing Russia in the Hopman Cup partnering Igor Andreev. She lost her opening match in the round-robin stage to Sabine Lisicki before defeating Yaroslava Shvedova and Laura Robson. However, Russia failed to make the final as they finished third in Group B.

Dementieva's first title of the year came at Sydney, where she was also the defending champion. She defeated world No. 1 Serena Williams in the final, successfully defending her title. En route to the final she defeated world No. 2, Dinara Safina, as well as the world No. 6, Victoria Azarenka, in the quarterfinals and semifinals, respectively, winning in straight sets on both occasions. She is the first woman since Martina Hingis in 2001 and 2002 to win the Sydney International in consecutive years.

Dementieva was seeded fifth at the Australian Open. She defeated Vera Dushevina in the first round. In the second round she lost to wild card, former world No. 1, and eventual finalist Justine Henin, despite having two set points in the first set, and one set point at 6–5 in the second set tie-break.

Dementieva's next tournament was the Open GdF Suez in Paris where she advanced to the final for the second consecutive year. In her second final of the year, she came from a set down to defeat Lucie Šafářová.

Dementieva was then the fifth seed at the Dubai Championships. She retired against Hantuchová in the second round because of shoulder injury while trailing 6–4, 1–1. Dementieva then played at the inaugural Malaysian Open in Kuala Lumpur. Seeded first, she advanced to her third final of the year where she fell in straight sets to Alisa Kleybanova.

Dementieva then took part in the Premier Mandatory events in North America. At Indian Wells, Dementieva lost to Agnieszka Radwańska in the quarterfinals. The following week at the Miami Open, she lost in the second round to Justine Henin.

Dementieva represented Russia in the semifinal round of the 2010 Fed Cup against the United States. She defeated Bethanie Mattek-Sands and Melanie Oudin in her two singles matches. In the deciding doubles match, Dementieva and Alla Kudryavtseva fell to Mattek-Sands and Liezel Huber.

At the Internazionali BNL d'Italia, where Dementieva was the sixth seed, she lost in the third round to a resurgent Ana Ivanovic for the first time. She then played at the Madrid Open, where she defeated Aleksandra Wozniak in the first round 6–0, 6–1. She lost to Alexandra Dulgheru in the second round even after serving for the match. Despite the loss, Dementieva managed to be the Russian No. 1 for the first time in her career.

Dementieva's next tournament was the Warsaw Open. As a second seed and receiving a bye in the first round, she lost to Tsvetana Pironkova in a nearly three-hour match.

Dementieva was the fifth seed at the French Open. She defeated Petra Martić in the first round and Anabel Medina Garrigues in the second round. Despite clear injuries, she managed to come from a set down and breaks down in the second and third sets to defeat Aleksandra Wozniak in the third round and ran past Chanelle Scheepers in the fourth round. She booked her place in the semi-finals of the tournament, where she faced Italian 17th seed Francesca Schiavone, after comeback from a set down to win over Nadia Petrova in the quarterfinals. She retired after Schiavone won the first set in a tie break with a torn left calf muscle which was sustained in the second round, and subsequently withdrew from Eastbourne and Wimbledon.

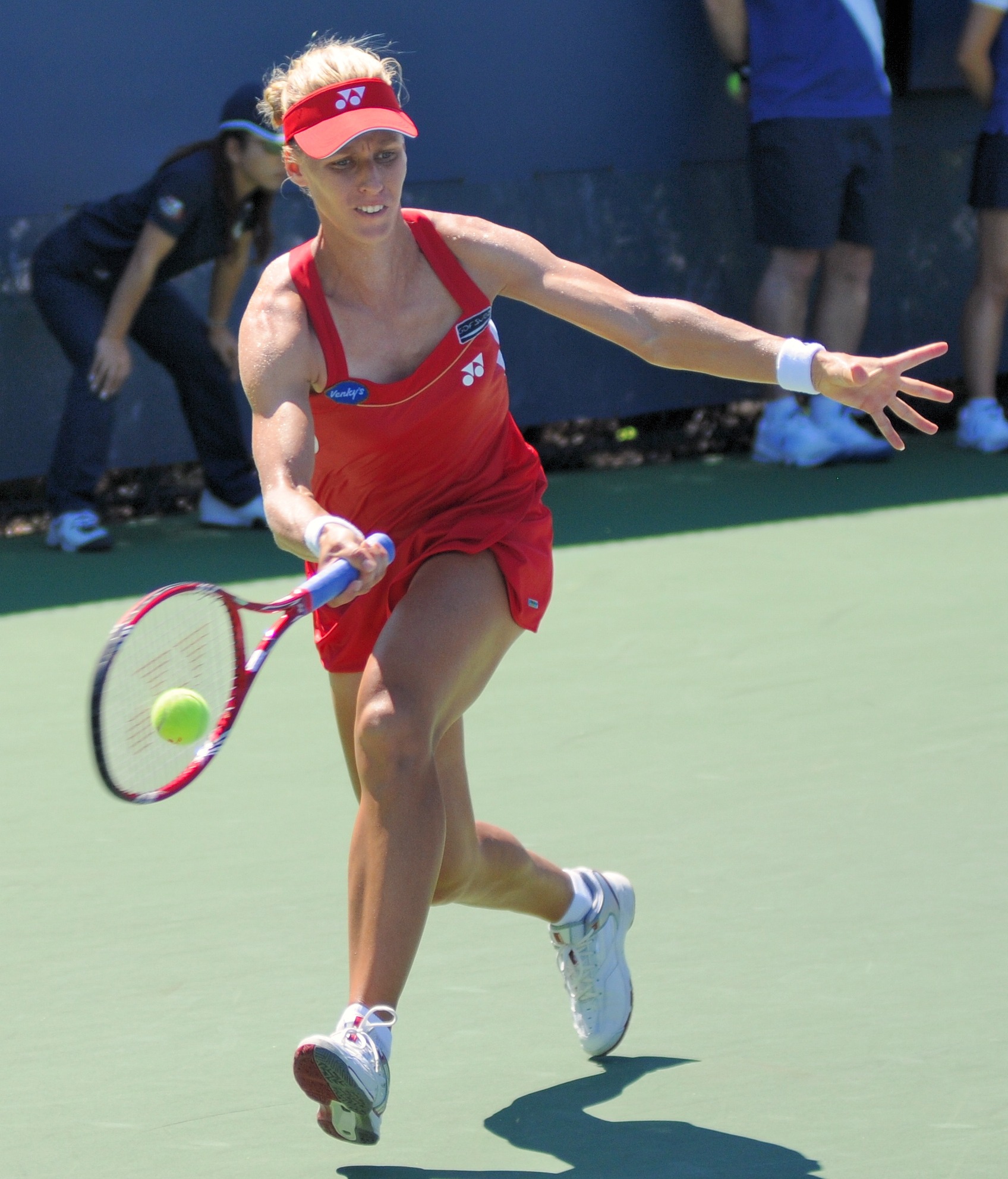
Dementieva at the 2010 US Open

Dementieva started her hardcourt campaign at Stanford, California, where she was the second seed. She advanced to the quarterfinals where she fell to Maria Sharapova in three sets. She lost to Anastasia Pavlyuchenkova in the second round at Cincinnati. She did not repeat as champion at the Rogers Cup after suffering a two-sets loss to Zheng Jie in the third round. She lost to Caroline Wozniacki in the semifinals at New Haven, despite serving for the match at 5–4 in the third set.

Dementieva was the 12th seed at the US Open. She defeated Olga Govortsova, Sybille Bammer and 24th seed Daniela Hantuchová to advance to the 4th round where she wasted four match points before falling to fifth seed Samantha Stosur.

As the seventh seed, Dementieva reached the finals of the Pan Pacific Open where she faced top seed Caroline Wozniacki. Dementieva defeated Yaroslava Shvedova, Flavia Pennetta, second seed Vera Zvonareva and fifth seed Francesca Schiavone, but eventually lost to Wozniacki. At the China Open, she suffered a 6–7, 6–7 loss to Ana Ivanovic in the third round.

On 9 October 2010, it was announced that Dementieva had qualified for the year-ending Tour Championships for the tenth time in her career.

Dementieva's final event of the year was the WTA Tour Championships, where she qualified for the third consecutive year, as the No. 7 seed. Dementieva was still struggling with her ankle injury. As a member of the Maroon Group, Dementieva fell to Caroline Wozniacki and defeated Sam Stosur. Dementieva then faced Francesca Schiavone and lost in two sets.

=== Retirement ===
Following her loss to Schiavone, Dementieva announced her retirement in an on-court ceremony on 29 October 2010. She ended her career ranked world No. 9, with 16 career singles titles and two Grand Slam final appearances. Dementieva said in her speech that it had been an honour to be part of the tour. Zvonareva called her an inspiration.

== Playing style ==
Dementieva was an offensive baseline player with powerful groundstrokes off both sides and excellent defensive skills. Her preferred groundstroke was her forehand, which she hit hard and flat. Although Dementieva's serve made major improvements over her career, it was always considered her weak spot and she led the WTA in double faults for many years.

== Career statistics ==
=== Singles performance timeline ===
Key
W	F	SF	QF	#R	RR	Q#	DNQ	A	NH

(W) winner; (F) finalist; (SF) semifinalist; (QF) quarterfinalist; (#R) rounds 4, 3, 2, 1; (RR) round-robin stage; (Q#) qualification round; (DNQ) did not qualify; (A) absent; (NH) not held; (SR) strike rate (events won / competed); (W–L) win–loss record.

Tournament	1995	1996	1997	1998	1999	2000	2001	2002	2003	2004	2005	2006	2007	2008	2009	2010	Career SR	Career W–L	Win %
Grand Slam tournaments
Australian Open	A	A	A	A	2R	3R	3R	4R	1R	1R	4R	1R	4R	4R	SF	2R	0 / 12	23–12	66%
French Open	A	A	A	A	2R	2R	2R	4R	1R	F	4R	3R	3R	QF	3R	SF	0 / 12	30–11	73%
Wimbledon	A	A	A	A	1R	1R	3R	4R	4R	1R	4R	QF	3R	SF	SF	A	0 / 11	27–11	71%
US Open	A	A	A	Q1	3R	SF	4R	2R	4R	F	SF	QF	3R	SF	2R	4R	0 / 12	39–12	76%
Win–loss	0–0	0–0	0–0	0–0	4–4	8–4	8–4	10–4	6–4	11–4	14–4	10–4	9–4	17–4	13–4	9–3	0 / 47	119–46	72%

== Fed Cup ==
Dementieva frequently played for the Russian Fed Cup team. She finished her career with an overall Fed Cup record of 26–9, broken down into marks of 22–5 in singles and 4–4 in doubles. Her record includes singles victories over Venus Williams, Mary Pierce, Amélie Mauresmo and Kim Clijsters.

In 2005, Dementieva almost single-handedly led Russia to capture the Fed Cup by beating France 3–2 in the final. All three points came from Dementieva, as she beat Pierce and Mauresmo in two single matches, and then won the deciding doubles match with partner Dinara Safina.

== In popular culture ==
- Blue Dog and Sponge Cake, a comedic band from Aurora, Colorado, created a song about Dementieva and fellow Russian tennis player Maria Sharapova. The song is called "Dementapova".
- Dementieva appeared in the music video of Igor Nikolayev's song "Kak Ty Prekrasna" (How Beautiful You Are).
- Dementieva's distinctive grunt is featured as a recurring beat in rapper Lil' Wayne's 2010 song "Sportscenter".

Sporting positions
Preceded by (Spain) Ana Alcázar	Orange Bowl Girls' Singles Champion; Category: 16 and under 1996	Succeeded by (Spain) Lourdes Domínguez Lino
Preceded by (Slovenia) Tina Pisnik	Orange Bowl Girls' Singles Champion; Category: 18 and under 1998	Succeeded by (Spain) María José Martínez Sánchez
Preceded by (Russia) Dinara Safina	US Open Series Champion; 2009	Succeeded by (Denmark) Caroline Wozniacki
Awards
Preceded by (United States) Serena Williams	WTA Most Improved Player; 2000	Succeeded by (Belgium) Justine Henin
Preceded by (Serbia) Ana Ivanovic	Karen Krantczke Sportsmanship Award; 2008	Succeeded by (Belgium) Kim Clijsters
Preceded by (Belgium) Kim Clijsters	Karen Krantczke Sportsmanship Award; 2010	Succeeded by (Czech Republic) Petra Kvitová
Preceded by New Award	Tour Fan Favorite Singles Player of the Year; 2009	Succeeded by (Russia) Maria Sharapova
Preceded by (Serbia) Ana Ivanovic	Diamond Aces; 2009	Succeeded by (Australia) Samantha Stosur
