= 2009 Maria Sharapova tennis season =

- Full name: Maria Sharapova
- Country: Russia

Singles
- Season record: 31–9
- Calendar titles: 1
- Year-end ranking: No. 14
- Ranking change from previous year: ▼5

Grand Slam & significant results
- Australian Open: DNP
- French Open: QF
- Wimbledon: 2R
- US Open: 3R
- Last updated on: 3 February 2013.

Results and statistics from Maria Sharapova's 2009 tennis season.

== Yearly summary ==
=== Pre-comeback ===
At the beginning of the year, Sharapova was forced to concede the defence of her Australian Open title, a decision which would see her drop out of the WTA's Top 10 for the first time since winning Wimbledon in 2004. Her continued absence from the Tour also cost her the titles she won in Doha and Amelia Island last year; she also missed both the Premier Mandatory events at Indian Wells and Miami, and subsequently saw her world ranking drop to No. 65.

Sharapova first attempted her comeback by playing doubles with Elena Vesnina at Indian Wells (she did not play in the singles tournament). This decision would backfire, as they lost to fellow Russians Ekaterina Makarova and Tatiana Poutchek in three sets in the first round.

=== Comeback to tennis ===
In May, it was announced that she would be making her comeback at the Warsaw Open, which she entered as a wild card entry. She eventually reached the quarter-finals, losing to eventual finalist Alona Bondarenko. In the week during which the tournament was held, though, her world ranking dropped to No. 126, her lowest ranking since 2003, but her run in Warsaw saw her rise to No. 102 in the world rankings.

=== French Open ===
Sharapova entered the 2009 French Open unseeded at a Major for the first time since the 2003 US Open. In the second round, she defeated 11th seed Nadia Petrova 6–2, 1–6, 8–6. She went on to reach the quarter-finals, where she suffered her worst defeat at a Major tournament, losing to Dominika Cibulková and winning only two games (she had to defend a match point at 0–6, 0–5 down in the second set, in the process avoiding her second career double bagel defeat). Despite the defeat, Sharapova moved back into the World's Top 100 in the rankings.

=== Grass court season ===
Sharapova started her grass court season at Birmingham, where she had won her first grass court title five years earlier. Unseeded, she defeated Stéphanie Dubois, Alexa Glatch, seventh seed and future Wimbledon quarter-finalist Francesca Schiavone and Yanina Wickmayer to reach the semi-finals, before being defeated by Li Na there. Her run in Birmingham brought her ranking back into the Top 60.

As it was in 2008, her Wimbledon campaign would once again turn out to be short-lived, as she was defeated in the second round by Gisela Dulko in three sets.

=== US Open series ===
Sharapova next played at the 2009 Bank of the West Classic, where she defeated Ai Sugiyama and Nadia Petrova before being defeated by Venus Williams in the final eight.

She next played at Los Angeles, where she recorded her first career victory against Victoria Azarenka before falling in three sets to eventual champion Flavia Pennetta in the semi-finals. She then reached her first final since April 2008 at the Rogers Cup, falling there to Elena Dementieva in straight sets.

To conclude the US Open series, she competed at the US Open as the 29th seed; this was her lowest seeding at a Major tournament since the 2004 Australian Open. She defeated Tsvetana Pironkova and Christina McHale for the loss of three games each in the first two rounds, but was then stunned in the third round by little-known Melanie Oudin in three sets.

=== Fall series ===
Sharapova picked up her first title since April 2008, when she won the Toray Pan Pacific Open event in Tokyo after her Serbian opponent Jelena Janković retired at 2–5 down in the first set. This marked her 20th career singles title. At Beijing, her final tournament of the season, she received a bye into the second round, where she defeated Victoria Azarenka in three sets, before falling to Peng Shuai in the third. Her impressive comeback eventually led to her finishing the year ranked World No. 14, having been No. 126 back in May.

== All matches ==
This table chronicles all the matches of Sharapova in 2009, including walkovers (W/O) which the WTA does not count as wins. They are marked ND for non-decision or no decision.

Key
W	F	SF	QF	#R	RR	Q#	P#	DNQ	A	Z#	PO	G	S	B	NMS	NTI	P	NH

(W) winner; (F) finalist; (SF) semifinalist; (QF) quarterfinalist; (#R) rounds 4, 3, 2, 1; (RR) round-robin stage; (Q#) qualification round; (P#) preliminary round; (DNQ) did not qualify; (A) absent; (Z#) Davis/Fed Cup Zonal Group (with number indication) or (PO) play-off; (G) gold, (S) silver or (B) bronze Olympic/Paralympic medal; (NMS) not a Masters tournament; (NTI) not a Tier I tournament; (P) postponed; (NH) not held; (SR) strike rate (events won / competed); (W–L) win–loss record.
To avoid confusion and double counting, these charts are updated at the conclusion of a tournament or when the player's participation has ended.

=== Singles matches ===
Tournament	#	Round	Opponent	Result	Score
Warsaw Open; Warsaw, Poland; Premier; Clay, outdoor 18–23 May 2009
Warsaw Open; Warsaw, Poland; Premier; Clay, outdoor 18–23 May 2009	1	1R	(Italy) Tathiana Garbin	Win	6–1, 6–7^{(6–8)}, 6–3
Warsaw Open; Warsaw, Poland; Premier; Clay, outdoor 18–23 May 2009	2	2R	(Belarus) Darya Kustova	Win	6–2, 6–0
Warsaw Open; Warsaw, Poland; Premier; Clay, outdoor 18–23 May 2009	3	QF	(Ukraine) Alona Bondarenko	Loss	2–6, 2–6
French Open; Paris, France; Grand Slam; Clay, outdoor 24 May–7 June 2009
French Open; Paris, France; Grand Slam; Clay, outdoor 24 May–7 June 2009	4	1R	(Belarus) Anastasiya Yakimova	Win	3–6, 6–1, 6–2
French Open; Paris, France; Grand Slam; Clay, outdoor 24 May–7 June 2009	5	2R	(Russia) Nadia Petrova	Win	6–2, 1–6, 8–6
French Open; Paris, France; Grand Slam; Clay, outdoor 24 May–7 June 2009	6	3R	(Russia) Yaroslava Shvedova	Win	1–6, 6–3, 6–4
French Open; Paris, France; Grand Slam; Clay, outdoor 24 May–7 June 2009	7	4R	(China) Li Na	Win	6–4, 0–6, 6–4
French Open; Paris, France; Grand Slam; Clay, outdoor 24 May–7 June 2009	8	QF	(Slovakia) Dominika Cibulková	Loss	0–6, 2–6
Aegon Classic; Birmingham, Great Britain; WTA Premier; Grass, outdoor 8–14 June 2009
Aegon Classic; Birmingham, Great Britain; WTA Premier; Grass, outdoor 8–14 June 2009	9	1R	(Canada) Stéphanie Dubois	Win	6–4, 6–2
Aegon Classic; Birmingham, Great Britain; WTA Premier; Grass, outdoor 8–14 June 2009	10	2R	(Russia) Mariya Koryttseva	Win	6–3, 6–4
Aegon Classic; Birmingham, Great Britain; WTA Premier; Grass, outdoor 8–14 June 2009	11	3R	(Italy) Francesca Schiavone	Win	6–1, 6–3
Aegon Classic; Birmingham, Great Britain; WTA Premier; Grass, outdoor 8–14 June 2009	12	QF	(Belgium) Yanina Wickmayer	Win	6–1, 2–6, 6–3
Aegon Classic; Birmingham, Great Britain; WTA Premier; Grass, outdoor 8–14 June 2009	13	SF	(China) Li Na	Loss	4–6, 4–6
The Championships, Wimbledon; London, Great Britain; Grand Slam; Grass, outdoor 22 June–5 July 2009
The Championships, Wimbledon; London, Great Britain; Grand Slam; Grass, outdoor 22 June–5 July 2009	14	1R	(Ukraine) Viktoriya Kutuzova	Win	7–5, 6–4
The Championships, Wimbledon; London, Great Britain; Grand Slam; Grass, outdoor 22 June–5 July 2009	15	2R	(Argentina) Gisela Dulko	Loss	2–6, 6–3, 4–6
Bank of the West Classic; Stanford, United States of America; WTA Premier; Hard, outdoor 27 July–2 August 2009
Bank of the West Classic; Stanford, United States of America; WTA Premier; Hard, outdoor 27 July–2 August 2009	16	1R	(Japan) Ai Sugiyama	Win	6–4, 6–7^{(6–8)}, 6–1
Bank of the West Classic; Stanford, United States of America; WTA Premier; Hard, outdoor 27 July–2 August 2009	17	2R	(Russia) Nadia Petrova	Win	6–1, 6–2
Bank of the West Classic; Stanford, United States of America; WTA Premier; Hard, outdoor 27 July–2 August 2009	18	QF	(United States) Venus Williams	Loss	2–6, 2–6
LA Women's Tennis Championships; Los Angeles, United States of America; WTA Premier; Hard, outdoor 3–9 August 2009
LA Women's Tennis Championships; Los Angeles, United States of America; WTA Premier; Hard, outdoor 3–9 August 2009	19	1R	(Australia) Jarmila Groth	Win	6–0, 6–4
LA Women's Tennis Championships; Los Angeles, United States of America; WTA Premier; Hard, outdoor 3–9 August 2009	20	2R	(Belarus) Victoria Azarenka	Win	6–7^{(4–7)}, 6–4, 6–2
LA Women's Tennis Championships; Los Angeles, United States of America; WTA Premier; Hard, outdoor 3–9 August 2009	21	3R	(Ukraine) Alona Bondarenko	Win	4–6, 6–0, 6–3
LA Women's Tennis Championships; Los Angeles, United States of America; WTA Premier; Hard, outdoor 3–9 August 2009	22	QF	(Poland) Urszula Radwańska	Win	6–4, 7–5
LA Women's Tennis Championships; Los Angeles, United States of America; WTA Premier; Hard, outdoor 3–9 August 2009	23	SF	(Italy) Flavia Pennetta	Loss	2–6, 6–4, 3–6
Rogers Cup; Toronto, Canada; WTA Premier 5 Hard, outdoor 17–23 August 2009
Rogers Cup; Toronto, Canada; WTA Premier 5 Hard, outdoor 17–23 August 2009	24	1R	(Russia) Nadia Petrova	Win	6–1, 6–4
Rogers Cup; Toronto, Canada; WTA Premier 5 Hard, outdoor 17–23 August 2009	25	2R	(Austria) Sybille Bammer	Win	6–3, 7–6^{(7–5)}
Rogers Cup; Toronto, Canada; WTA Premier 5 Hard, outdoor 17–23 August 2009	26	3R	(Russia) Vera Zvonareva	Win	6–2, 7–6^{(7–3)}
Rogers Cup; Toronto, Canada; WTA Premier 5 Hard, outdoor 17–23 August 2009	27	QF	(Poland) Agnieszka Radwańska	Win	6–2, 7–6^{(7–5)}
Rogers Cup; Toronto, Canada; WTA Premier 5 Hard, outdoor 17–23 August 2009	28	SF	(Russia) Alisa Kleybanova	Win	6–2, 4–6, 6–4
Rogers Cup; Toronto, Canada; WTA Premier 5 Hard, outdoor 17–23 August 2009	29	F	(Russia) Elena Dementieva	Loss	4–6, 3–6
US Open; New York, United States of America; Grand Slam; Hard, outdoor 31 August–14 September 2009
US Open; New York, United States of America; Grand Slam; Hard, outdoor 31 August–14 September 2009	30	1R	(Bulgaria) Tsvetana Pironkova	Win	6–3, 6–0
US Open; New York, United States of America; Grand Slam; Hard, outdoor 31 August–14 September 2009	31	2R	(United States) Christina McHale	Win	6–2, 6–1
US Open; New York, United States of America; Grand Slam; Hard, outdoor 31 August–14 September 2009	32	3R	(United States) Melanie Oudin	Loss	6–3, 4–6, 5–7
Toray Pan Pacific Open; Tokyo, Japan; WTA Premier 5 Hard, outdoor 28 September–3 October 2009
Toray Pan Pacific Open; Tokyo, Japan; WTA Premier 5 Hard, outdoor 28 September–3 October 2009	33	1R	(Italy) Francesca Schiavone	Win	4–6, 7–5, 6–1
Toray Pan Pacific Open; Tokyo, Japan; WTA Premier 5 Hard, outdoor 28 September–3 October 2009	34	2R	(Australia) Samantha Stosur	Win	6–0, 6–1
Toray Pan Pacific Open; Tokyo, Japan; WTA Premier 5 Hard, outdoor 28 September–3 October 2009	35	3R	(Russia) Alisa Kleybanova	Win	2–6, 6–2, 6–2
Toray Pan Pacific Open; Tokyo, Japan; WTA Premier 5 Hard, outdoor 28 September–3 October 2009	36	QF	(Czech Republic) Iveta Benešová	Win	6–4, 7–5
Toray Pan Pacific Open; Tokyo, Japan; WTA Premier 5 Hard, outdoor 28 September–3 October 2009	37	SF	(Poland) Agnieszka Radwańska	Win	6–3, 2–6, 6–4
Toray Pan Pacific Open; Tokyo, Japan; WTA Premier 5 Hard, outdoor 28 September–3 October 2009	38	W	(Serbia) Jelena Janković	Win (1)	5–2, ret.
China Open; Beijing, China; WTA Premier Mandatory; Hard, outdoor 3–11 October 2009
China Open; Beijing, China; WTA Premier Mandatory; Hard, outdoor 3–11 October 2009		1R	Bye		
China Open; Beijing, China; WTA Premier Mandatory; Hard, outdoor 3–11 October 2009	39	2R	(Belarus) Victoria Azarenka	Win	6–3, 6–7^{(5–7)}, 7–5
China Open; Beijing, China; WTA Premier Mandatory; Hard, outdoor 3–11 October 2009	40	3R	(China) Peng Shuai	Loss	2–6, 4–6

== Tournament schedule ==
=== Singles Schedule ===
Date	Championship	Location	Category	Surface	Prev. result	New result	Outcome
18 May 2009– 23 May 2009	Warsaw Open	Warsaw (POL)	WTA Premier	Clay	DNP	QF	Lost in the quarter-finals against Alona Bondarenko
24 May 2009– 7 June 2009	French Open	Paris (FRA)	Grand Slam	Clay	4R	QF	Lost in the quarter-finals against Dominika Cibulková
8 June 2009– 14 June 2009	Aegon Classic	Birmingham (GBR)	WTA Premier	Grass	DNP	SF	Lost in the semi-finals against Li Na
22 June 2009; 5 July 2009	The Championships, Wimbledon	London (GBR)	Grand Slam	Grass	2R	2R	Lost in the second round against Gisela Dulko
27 July 2009– 2 August 2009	Bank of the West Classic	Stanford (USA)	WTA Premier	Hard	DNP	QF	Lost in the quarter-finals against Venus Williams
3 August 2009– 9 August 2009	LA Women's Tennis Championships	Los Angeles (USA)	WTA Premier	Hard	DNP	SF	Lost in the semi-finals against Flavia Pennetta
17 August 2009– 23 August 2009	Rogers Cup	Toronto (CAN)	WTA Premier 5	Hard	3R	F	Lost in the final against Elena Dementieva
31 August 2009– 14 September 2009	US Open	New York (USA)	Grand Slam	Hard	DNP	3R	Lost in the third round against Melanie Oudin
28 September 2009– 3 October 2009	Toray Pan Pacific Open	Tokyo (JPN)	WTA Premier 5	Hard	DNP	W	Won in the final against Jelena Janković
3 October 2009– 11 October 2009	China Open	Beijing (CHN)	WTA Premier Mandatory	Hard	DNP	3R	Lost in the third round against Peng Shuai

== Yearly Records ==
=== Head-to-head matchups ===
Ordered by percentage, number of victories to number of losses, then in alphabetical order

- (Russia) Nadia Petrova 3–0
- (Belarus) Victoria Azarenka 2–0
- (Russia) Alisa Kleybanova 2–0
- (Poland) Agnieszka Radwańska 2–0
- (Italy) Francesca Schiavone 2–0
- (Ukraine) Alona Bondarenko 1–1
- (China) Li Na 1–1
- (Austria) Sybille Bammer 1–0
- (Czech Republic) Iveta Benešová 1–0
- (Canada) Stéphanie Dubois 1–0
- (Italy) Tathiana Garbin 1–0
- (Australia) Jarmila Groth 1–0
- (Serbia) Jelena Janković 1–0
- (Russia) Mariya Koryttseva 1–0
- (Belarus) Darya Kustova 1–0
- (Ukraine) Viktoriya Kutuzova 1–0
- (United States) Christina McHale 1–0
- (Bulgaria) Tsvetana Pironkova 1–0
- (Poland) Urszula Radwańska 1–0
- (Russia) Yaroslava Shvedova 1–0
- (Australia) Samantha Stosur 1–0
- (Japan) Ai Sugiyama 1–0
- (Belgium) Yanina Wickmayer 1–0
- (Belarus) Anastasiya Yakimova 1–0
- (Russia) Vera Zvonareva 1–0
- (Slovakia) Dominika Cibulková 0–1
- (Russia) Elena Dementieva 0–1
- (Argentina) Gisela Dulko 0–1
- (United States) Melanie Oudin 0–1
- (Italy) Flavia Pennetta 0–1
- (China) Peng Shuai 0–1
- (United States) Venus Williams 0–1

=== Finals ===
==== Singles: 2 (1–1) ====
Category WTA Premier 5 (1–1)	Titles by surface Hard (1–1)	Titles by conditions Outdoors (1–1)

Outcome	No.	Date	Championship	Surface	Opponent in the final	Score in the final
Runner-up		August 23, 2009	Toronto, Canada (1)	Hard	(Russia) Elena Dementieva	4–6, 3–6
Winner	20.	October 3, 2009	Tokyo, Japan (2)	Hard	(Serbia) Jelena Janković	5–2, ret.

== See also ==
- 2009 Serena Williams tennis season
- 2009 WTA Tour
