= 2009 Serena Williams tennis season =

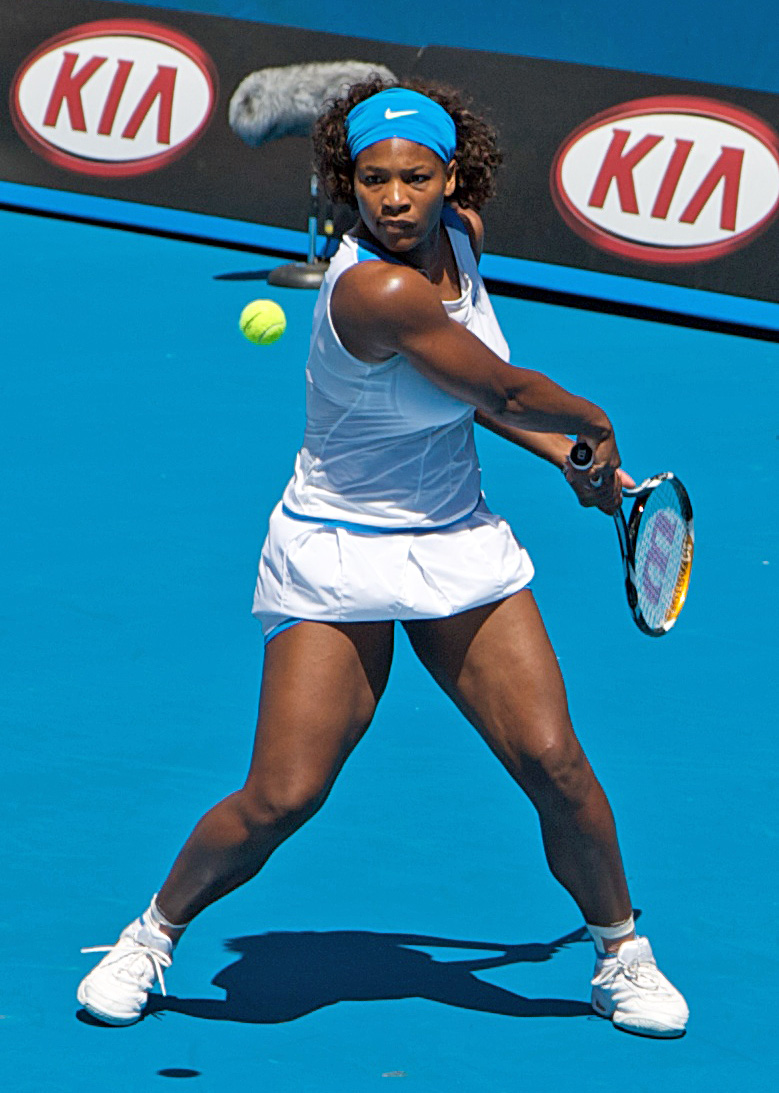
- Serena Williams at the Australian Open
- Full name: Serena Jameka Williams
- Country: United States
- Calendar prize money: $6,545,586

Singles
- Season record: 50–12 (81%)
- Calendar titles: 3
- Year-end ranking: 1
- Ranking change from previous year: ▲1

Grand Slam & significant results
- Australian Open: W
- French Open: QF
- Wimbledon: W
- US Open: SF
- Championships: W

Doubles
- Season record: 24-2 (92.3%)
- Calendar titles: 4
- Year-end ranking: No. 3
- Ranking change from previous year: ▲25

Grand Slam doubles results
- Australian Open: W
- French Open: 3R
- Wimbledon: W
- US Open: W
- WTA Championships: SF

Serena Williams's 2009 tennis season officially began at the 2009 Medibank International Sydney. Williams finished the year ranked world no. 1 for the second time in her career, having played in 16 tournaments, more than any other year. She also broke the record previously set by Justine Henin for the most prize money earned by a female tennis player in one year, with Williams earning $6,545,586. In doubles, she finished the year ranked world no. 3, despite playing only six tournaments as a pair. She won five Grand Slam titles, putting her total Grand Slam titles at 23.

Williams was named Female Athlete of the Year by the Associated Press in a landslide vote (66 of 158 votes – no other candidate received more than 18 votes). She also was the International Tennis Federation World Champion in singles and doubles.

== Year in detail ==
=== Early hard court season and Australian Open ===
==== Medibank International Sydney ====
Williams began her 2009 season at the Medibank International Sydney as the top seed and faced local Samantha Stosur in the first round. Williams broke Stosur in the fourth game and maintained the advantage to close out the set. The second set went to a tie-break with a couple of breaks, the breaker went to Stosur. Stosur served for the match at the 10th game and had three match points, but Williams broke back and held. Williams then broke Stosur again in the twelfth game to take the match. In the second round Williams' cruised pass Sara Errani, losing just 3 games. In the quarterfinals Williams' had another tough match this time against Caroline Wozniacki, Williams lost the first set in a tie-break. The second set went to Williams when she broke in the ninth game after failing to serve the set out in the previous game. In the final set, Wozniacki took the lead and serve for the match at the twelfth game and had three match points but Williams broke and forced a tie-break, which she won to three. In the semifinals, Williams was routined by Dementieva in straight sets.

==== Australian Open ====
Williams in singles en route to her fifth Australian Open.

Williams came into the Australian Open having a chance to claim the world number 1 ranking. In her opening round she face Yuan Meng of China and won the first set with a single break and took the first 4 games of the second set and held the lead to win the match. In the following round she faced Gisela Dulko, where she won the first set easily. However, in the second set Dulko served for the set in the ninth game and had six set points, but Williams saved them all and broke and took the next 3 games to win in straight sets. In the third round she faced China's Peng Shuai and took the first set winning the last 6 games of the set. The second set was closer, with Williams being broke twice but still won the set in the tenth game. In the Round of 16, Williams got a lucky break, when her opponent Victoria Azarenka retires due to the heat, after Azarenka won the first set, and Williams was up by a break in the second. In the quarterfinals, Williams faced 8th seed Svetlana Kuznetsova and was in trouble when she fell by a set and Kuznetsova serving for the match at 5–4, However Williams took 9 of the last 10 games to win the match and be the only non-Russian in the semifinals. She avenged her loss to Elena Dementieva in their previous match as she defeated the Russian in straight sets with a break lead in each set. In the final, she faced world no. 3 Dinara Safina, wherein the winner will claim the world no. 1. In the first set Williams took in a bagel, hitting 12 winner and 2 unforced errors. In the second set Safina, had more resistance as she took 3 games in the set, but Williams was proven to good as she won her 10th slam title. The win also meant that Williams has now become the highest paid female athlete in history, overtaking golfer Annika Sörenstam.

In doubles, she paired with sister Venus and won their first three matches in straight sets against Svetlana Kuznetsova and Nadia Petrova, Ayumi Morita and Martina Müller, and Samantha Stosur and Rennae Stubbs. In the quarterfinals, they dropped their first set of the tournament against the team of Hsieh Su-wei and Peng Shuai, when they lost the second set, but eventually won in three. In the semifinals, they faced the team of Casey Dellacqua and Francesca Schiavone and won easily with a loss of only two games. In the final, they faced Daniela Hantuchová and Ai Sugiyama also known as "Hantuyama", the Williams sister fell by an early break but took six of the last seven games to the take the first set. They then took the second set, breaking in the ninth game of the second set to win the match.

==== Open GDF Suez ====
"I never think about whether it's good for women's tennis for me to be No.1, but obviously I'm happy to be No.1. It's really cool. Most of all, I love to win big tournaments and just tournaments in general."

Having just re-claimed the no. 1 ranking, Williams competed in the Open GDF Suez. She cruised through in her first round against Iveta Benešová, Williams took the last 6 games of the first set to win it and then went on to take the second set as well. In the following round, she cruised pass Croat Karolina Šprem without dropping a point on serve in straight sets. In the quarterfinals, it was again smooth sailing for Williams as she dispatches Frenchwoman Émilie Loit in straight sets. Williams was then forced to withdraw from her semifinal match against Elena Dementieva due to a right knee tendon injury.

==== Dubai Tennis Championships ====
Williams next scheduled event is the Dubai Tennis Championships. Being the top seed, Williams received a bye into the second round, where she faced Italian Sara Errani, Williams dropped the first set, but came back dropping just two games in the nest two sets and winning a bagel in the third. She then faced 13th seed Zheng Jie, where she won in straight sets. In the quarterfinals, Williams faced former World no. 1 and reigning French Open champion Ana Ivanovic and won in four in straight sets, coming from a break down in the second set. In the semifinals, Williams faced sister Venus Williams in their 19th meeting having split their previous 18. The first set went to Venus, after Serena's first service percentage was a dire 36%, compared to her elder sibling's 83%, and she delivered six double faults, whereas Venus kept her slate clean. In the second set Serena cleaned her game, came back and won it to push a decider. The third set then went to a tie-break, which Venus won, thus ending Serena's 13 match winning-streak.

==== Sony Ericsson Open ====
Williams entered the Sony Ericsson Open as the top seed and received a bye into the second round. Williams began her campaign for a record sixth title against American wild card Alexa Glatch and won in straight sets. In the following round, she faced Peng Shuai and won in straight sets, however despite the straight sets win, Williams was broken three times. In the fourth round she faced Zheng Jie, Williams won the first five games, however Zheng won the next five games to even it out. Williams eventually broke in the twelfth game to win the set. In the second set Zheng was ahead by a break twice but failed to capitalize, however she broke Williams in the eleventh game and held to go to a decider. Zheng led by a break in the decider, but Williams was able to get back winning six of the last seven games to advance. In the quarterfinals, Williams faced her third Chinese opponent in a row in Li Na, Williams suffered a slow start losing the first five games, but was able to find some form to win the next four. However, Li was able to hold serve in the tenth game to win the set. The second set went to a tie-break after both players failed to take advantage of break points, Williams won the breaker losing only a point. Williams then broke Li in the third and fifth games and served it out in the eight game to advance to the semifinals In the semifinals, she faced sister Venus Williams, Serena served for the first set at ninth game, but was broken just to break again to take the set. In the second set Venus broke in the ninth game to push it to a decider. In the third set while serving to stay in the match at 5–3, Serena broke Venus to advance to her 7th Miami final. In the final, Williams faced Victoria Azarenka and lost convincingly 3–6, 1–6. Williams was hampered with ankle and quad injuries and was advised not to play in the final.

=== Clay court season and French Open ===
==== Andalucia Tennis Experience, Internazionali BNL d'Italia, Mutua Madrileña Madrid Open ====
Williams then headed to the clay court season. Her first tournament was at the Andalucia Tennis Experience, however she was upset by then world no. 95 Klára Zakopalová in three sets, with Williams winning the second. She then headed to the Internazionali BNL d'Italia having dropped the number 1 ranking to Safina, she faced Patty Schnyder in the second round after receiving a bye and lost in three sets, after winning the second set. Her clay court season has gone from bad to worse when she retired against Francesca Schiavone after having dropped the first set in the first round of the Mutua Madrileña Madrid Open due to a right knee injury. This is extended her losing streak to four, the longest in her career.

==== French Open ====
"I would never do that. I've never sunk (so) low. I've always been a really clean player and a good player, and it doesn't take that to win. I looked her dead in the eye and I said, 'Why? Just be honest if you hit the ball or not.' She wouldn't even look at me. She looked down and I just have no respect for anybody who can't play a professional game."

— Williams after her match against Martinez Sanchez.

Williams entered the French Open having not won a match on clay. In the first round she faced Klára Zakopalová, who beat her in their last encounter. Williams was quick to take the lead was a set and a break-up; Williams squandered 5 match points in the ninth game and lost the second set in a tie-break. Williams then led the third with a break and had three match points in the eight game and had another three match points, but Zakopalová came back to get it on serve, just to lose her serve in the tenth game of the third set to hand the win to Williams in Williams' ninth match point. This ends Williams' four match losing streak. In the second round, Williams faced Virginia Ruano Pascual and unlike her first-round match, Williams cruised through, losing just two games including a bagel in the first set. In her next match she faced another Spaniard in María José Martínez Sánchez. Martínez Sánchez took the first set with a break, but with controversy as Williams fired in a powerful shot that appeared to graze Martínez Sánchez's hand as she looked to defend herself. The Spaniard denied that such happened, Martínez Sánchez got the break in that game and took the set. Williams came back and took the last two sets with a single break lead in each set. In the fourth round, she face Canadian Aleksandra Wozniak and won comfortably in straight sets in 53 minutes. In the quarterfinals, she faced Russian Svetlana Kuznetsova, Kuznetsova took the first set in a tie-break after saving a set point on her own serve in the twelfth game. Kuznetsova served for the match in the ninth game of the second set, but Williams broke through and won the last four games to push it to a decider. Williams then led by an early break just to surrender it and the match to Kuznetsova when she got broken in the twelfth game of the third set. Williams later admitted that she got tight in the match.

In the doubles, Williams paired again with sister Venus and entered as the fifth seeds; the sisters scrapped through their first two matches, winning it in three against the teams of Andrea Hlaváčková and Lucie Hradecká, and Gisela Dulko and Ágnes Szávay. However, their resistance was placed in halt as they lost in the third round to Bethanie Mattek-Sands and Nadia Petrova; after winning the first set, they eventually lost in a tie-break in the final set.

=== Wimbledon Championships ===
Williams entered Wimbledon Championships as the second seed and favorite. In her opening match, she faced Neuza Silva and won in straight sets without facing a break point. She hit nine aces and 32 winners in the win. In the second round, she faced Australian Jarmila Groth and won the first set by breaking Groth in the fourth and eight game. In the second set, Groth didn't held serve but broke Williams once in the set, handing Williams the match. The match lasted only 57 minutes. In the third round, she faced Italy's Roberta Vinci and won in straight sets, despite getting broken twice in the match, once in each set. In the round of 16, she faced Daniela Hantuchová and won easily in straight sets. In the quarterfinals, Williams faced Victoria Azarenka, the woman that defeated her in the final of Miami, Williams won the last four games of the first set to win it. Azarenka then led by a break in the second set, but Williams came back once again winning the last four games to advance. In the semifinals, Williams faced rival Elena Dementieva. The first set saw Dementieva breaking the Williams serve just to be broken back. The set was pushed to a tie-break, which was won by Dementieva. Williams then broke in opening game of the second just to be broken in the sixth game. Williams then broke the Russian in the 11th game and served out the set to force a third set. In the final set, Dementieva broke early in the deciding set for a 3–1 lead only for Williams to break back immediately.Dementieva had a break and match point in the tenth games only for Williams to retrieve it with a low volley that clipped the net. The match remained close until Williams secured a break in the 13th game and serve it out and head to the final. In the final, she faced sister Venus Williams in their fourth Wimbledon final. Serena took the first set in a tie-break, the first saw Venus having break points but failing to convert whereas Serena didn't have any. Serena broke Venus twice in the second set including in the final game and won in her fourth match point to win her 11th slam and third Wimbledon.

Once again, Williams paired with her sister Venus Williams in doubles as the fourth seeds. In the first round, they faced the French team of Virginie Razzano and Aravane Rezaï and won in three in both sets. They then cruised pass Sabine Lisicki and Aleksandra Wozniak in the second round in straight sets. In the third round, they faced the Chinese pair of Yan Zi and Zheng Jie and dominated winning in a double bagel. In the final eight, they defeated Anna-Lena Grönefeld and Vania King in straight sets. In the semifinals, they faced the top seeds and co-world no. 1's Cara Black and Liezel Huber and won losing only three games. In the final they took on the Australian duo of Samantha Stosur and Rennae Stubbs and won in two close sets, winning the first in a breaker and the second with a single break lead to claim their ninth slam as a team.

=== US Open Series ===
==== Bank of the West Classic ====
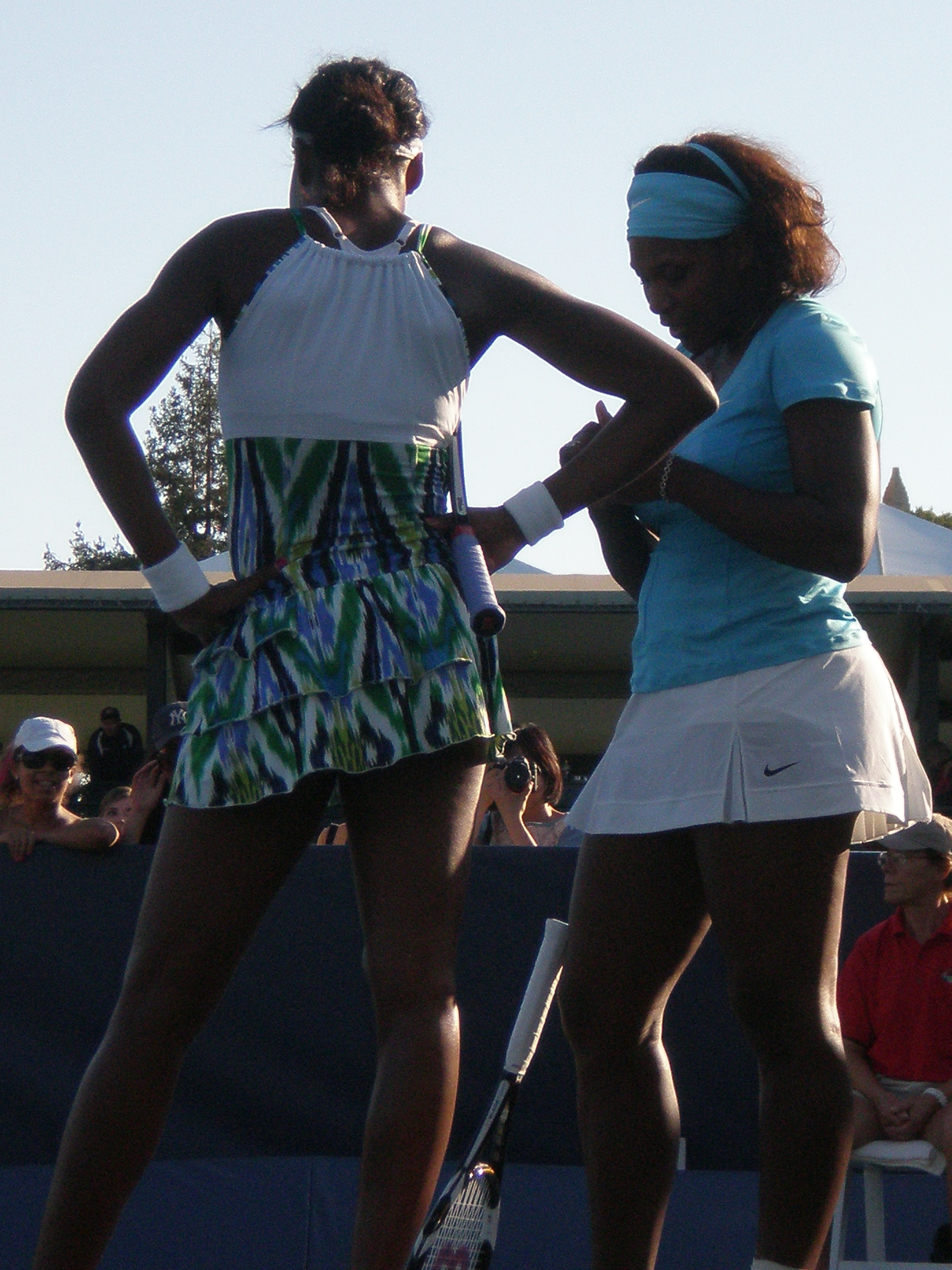
Serena with sister Venus in Stanford

Williams began her US Open preparation at the Bank of the West Classic. Williams faced Li Na in the first round, she had a set and had two match points in the eight game, however Li came back to force it to a tie-break. Williams closed out the match in her seventh match point. In the second round she faced Hungarian Melinda Czink, Williams broke in the fourth game and held it to take the set. Czink led by an early break, but Williams was able to force it to a tie-break, where she saved a set point and won the set to advance. In the quarterfinals, Williams took on Samantha Stosur, Stosur won the first set, but Williams came back winning the second. Williams had break points in the fifth game but failed to convert, that proved costly as Stosur took the next three games to take the final set and the match.

The Williams Sisters paired up to play doubles. They cruised through their first three matches in straight sets to advance to the finals, defeating the teams of Chen Yi and Mashona Washington, Līga Dekmeijere and Julie Ditty, and Bethanie Mattek-Sands and Nadia Petrova. They claimed their third title of the year by defeating the team of Yung-Jan Chan and Monica Niculescu in the final.

==== Western & Southern Financial Group Women's Open ====
Williams next scheduled event is the Western & Southern Financial Group Women's Open. Williams received a bye in the first round and defeated Kateryna Bondarenko in the second round in straight sets. In the following round she faced Sybille Bammer, this time ending up in the losing side in straight sets. Williams also lost her only previous encounter with Bammer.

==== Rogers Cup ====
Williams made her final stop before the US Open at the Rogers Cup. Williams got a bye to advance to the second round where she faced Yaroslava Shvedova and easily won in straight set only dropping 5 games. In the next round, Williams faced Alona Bondarenko and once again won with only dropping 5 games. In the quarterfinals, for the third match in a row, Williams only dropped five games this time to Czech Lucie Šafářová. In the semifinals, she faced Elena Dementieva for the fourth time in the year. Williams served for the match in the ninth game but Dementieva rallied to push the first set into a tie-break, which Dementieva won. Dementieva then took advantage taking the second set dropping only a game to advance to the final.

==== US Open ====
"Last night everyone could truly see the passion I have for my job. Now that I have had time to gain my composure, I can see that while I don't agree with the unfair line call, in the heat of battle I let my passion and emotion get the better of me and as a result handled the situation poorly. I would like to thank my fans and supporters for understanding that I am human and I look forward to continuing the journey, both professionally and personally, with you all as I move forward and grow from this experience."

— Serena Williams' statement to fans following semifinal match.

Williams began her quest for her twelfth slam at the US Open, she entered the tournament as the defending champion and is trying to win US Open for two consecutive years for the first time. She opened her campaign against compatriot Alexa Glatch, Williams won easily in straight sets despite making 18 winners to 19 unforced errors in the match. In the following round, she faced Melinda Czink, and won with a double breadstick victory. Williams made 25 winners to just 9 unforced errors. In the third round she faced María José Martínez Sánchez for the first time after their controversial match in the French, Williams broke in the second game and held it through to take the first set. In the second set Williams went behind by an early break but came back to serve it out in the twelfth game. In the next round, she stormed pass Daniela Hantuchová, as Williams reeled in 10 games in a row starting from the fifth game of the first set to move on. In the final eight, Williams faced Italian Flavia Pennetta and won in straight sets, hitting 22 winners to 19 unforced errors. After several rain delays, her semifinal match against Kim Clijsters took place 4 days after her quarterfinal match. Williams was down by a set and 5-6 15–30, serving to stay in the match when a foot fault was called that gave Clijsters two match points. Williams then launched into a tirade directed at the lineswoman, for which Serena was given a code violation. The violation ended up as a point penalty due to receiving a warning for racquet abuse earlier in the match, thus ending the match in controversial fashion. The following day, Williams was issued the maximum permissible on-site fine of $10,000 (plus $500 for racquet abuse). After further investigation, the Grand Slam Committee in November 2009 fined her $175,000 in lieu of suspending her from the 2010 US Open or other Grand Slam events. They also placed her on a two-year probation, so if Williams committed another offense in the following two years at a Grand Slam tournament, she would be suspended from participating in the following US Open. If she committed no offenses in the next two years, her fine would be reduced to $82,500. Williams initially refused to apologize for her outburst, both in her post-match press conference and in an official statement released the following day. She eventually apologized to the lineswoman in a statement two days following the incident.

Vying for their first title as a team at the US Open in ten years, the Williams sisters made quick work of their first three opponents Julia Görges and Arantxa Parra Santonja, Yung-Jan Chan and Katarina Srebotnik, and Sorana Cîrstea and Caroline Wozniacki defeating them all in straight sets. In the quarterfinals they defeated Yan Zi and Zheng Jie defeating them in two tight sets. In the semifinals, they faced the Russian pairing of Alisa Kleybanova and Ekaterina Makarova and won the first set in tie-break. However, they lost the second set ending their 29-set winning streak. The final set went to the Williams sisters as they advance to the final. In the final, they faced top ranked doubles team of Cara Black and Liezel Huber and took control of the match to claim their tenth slam as a team and their second US Open crown.

=== Asian Swing and Year-End Championships ===
==== China Open ====
Williams then went to Asia at the China Open with a chance of regaining the world no. 1 ranking from Dinara Safina. In the first round she faced Estonian Kaia Kanepi and won in straights with a single break lead in each set. Williams then defeated Ekaterina Makarova in the second round in two easy sets and claimed the no. 1 ranking after Safina fell earlier in the day. In the round of 16, she took on Russian Nadia Petrova, Petrova took the first set, with Williams coming back to take the second. In the third set both displayed good serving as neither dropped serve to push it to a tie-break, which Petrova won.

==== WTA Tour Championships ====
Williams entered the Year-End Championships as the second seed and was placed in the Maroon group with Elena Dementieva, Svetlana Kuznetsova and sister Venus Williams. Williams was in contention for the Year-End no. 1 ranking along with top seed Dinara Safina. Williams began her tournament against Svetlana Kuznetsova. Williams rallied in the first coming back from a break twice to take it to a tie-break, Williams then took the second set breaking Kuznetsova in the 11th game of the set and served it out to win the match. In her second round robin match, Williams faced older sister Venus Williams. Serena lost the first set but came back to win the second. In the finals set Serena was up by a double break, just to see Venus take five games in a row. Serena was serving to stay in that match in twelfth game and saved a match point to go to a tie-break, with Serena taking the breaker. Due to Safina's withdrawal from the event, thus securing Serena Williams the Year End no. 1 ranking only for the second time in her career. In her final group match, she took on Elena Dementieva, whom she has split their 4 meeting in the year, Dementieva began the match by breaking Williams in the third game, just to see Williams get back by winning the next seven game to take the first set and an early break. Dementieva came back to push it on serve but got broken in the ninth game of the set and Williams closed it out to go 3–0 in her group. In the semifinals, Williams faced Caroline Wozniacki, where she took the first set and was broken in the first game when Wozniacki retired due to a left abdominal strain. In the final it was an all-Williams final, as she took on sister Venus Williams, Serena took the first set breaking Venus twice. The second set, went on serve all throughout, with no breaks thus going to a tie-break, which Serena won to cap her no. 1 ranking with her 35th title.

Williams qualified with sister Venus Williams and played for the first time as team in the Year-End Championships. In the semifinals they faced the Spanish duo of Nuria Llagostera Vives and María José Martínez Sánchez, where they took the first set but lost the second set. In the match tie-break, the Williams sisters lost it by 10 points to 8.

== All matches ==
=== Singles matches ===
Tournament	Match	Round	Opponent	Rank	Result	Score
Medibank International Sydney; Sydney, Australia; WTA Premier; Hard; 11–16 January 2009	485	1R	(Australia) Samantha Stosur	#46	Win	6–3, 6–7^{(7–9)}, 7–5
Medibank International Sydney; Sydney, Australia; WTA Premier; Hard; 11–16 January 2009	486	2R	(Italy) Sara Errani	#38	Win	6–1, 6–2
Medibank International Sydney; Sydney, Australia; WTA Premier; Hard; 11–16 January 2009	487	QF	(Denmark) Caroline Wozniacki	#12	Win	6–7^{(7-9)}, 6–3, 7–6^{(7–3)}
Medibank International Sydney; Sydney, Australia; WTA Premier; Hard; 11–16 January 2009	488	SF	(Russia) Elena Dementieva	#4	Loss	3–6, 1–6
Australian Open; Melbourne, Australia; Grand Slam; Hard, outdoor 19 January - 1 February 2009	489	1R	(China) Yuan Meng	#123	Win	6–3, 6–2
Australian Open; Melbourne, Australia; Grand Slam; Hard, outdoor 19 January - 1 February 2009	490	2R	(Argentina) Gisela Dulko	#45	Win	6–3, 7–5
Australian Open; Melbourne, Australia; Grand Slam; Hard, outdoor 19 January - 1 February 2009	491	3R	(China) Peng Shuai	#41	Win	6–1, 6–4
Australian Open; Melbourne, Australia; Grand Slam; Hard, outdoor 19 January - 1 February 2009	492	4R	(Belarus) Victoria Azarenka	#14	Win	3–6, 4–2 ret
Australian Open; Melbourne, Australia; Grand Slam; Hard, outdoor 19 January - 1 February 2009	493	QF	(Russia) Svetlana Kuznetsova	#8	Win	5–7, 7–5, 6–1
Australian Open; Melbourne, Australia; Grand Slam; Hard, outdoor 19 January - 1 February 2009	494	SF	(Russia) Elena Dementieva	#4	Win	6–3, 6–4
Australian Open; Melbourne, Australia; Grand Slam; Hard, outdoor 19 January - 1 February 2009	495	F	(Russia) Dinara Safina	#3	Win	6–0, 6–3
Open GDF Suez; Paris, France; WTA Premier; Hard (i); 9–15 February 2009	496	1R	(Czech Republic) Iveta Benešová	#34	Win	6–1, 6–4
Open GDF Suez; Paris, France; WTA Premier; Hard (i); 9–15 February 2009	497	2R	(Croatia) Karolina Šprem	#145	Win	6–1, 6–2
Open GDF Suez; Paris, France; WTA Premier; Hard (i); 9–15 February 2009	498	QF	(France) Émilie Loit	#134	Win	6–4, 6–1
Open GDF Suez; Paris, France; WTA Premier; Hard (i); 9–15 February 2009	-	SF	(Russia) Elena Dementieva	#4	N/A	Withdrew
Dubai Tennis Championships; Dubai, United Arab Emirates; WTA Premier 5 Hard; 15–21 February 2009	-	1R	Bye			
Dubai Tennis Championships; Dubai, United Arab Emirates; WTA Premier 5 Hard; 15–21 February 2009	499	2R	(Italy) Sara Errani	#32	Win	4–6, 6–2, 6–0
Dubai Tennis Championships; Dubai, United Arab Emirates; WTA Premier 5 Hard; 15–21 February 2009	500	3R	(China) Zheng Jie	#20	Win	6–4, 6–2
Dubai Tennis Championships; Dubai, United Arab Emirates; WTA Premier 5 Hard; 15–21 February 2009	501	QF	(Serbia) Ana Ivanovic	#8	Win	6–4, 6–4
Dubai Tennis Championships; Dubai, United Arab Emirates; WTA Premier 5 Hard; 15–21 February 2009	502	SF	(United States) Venus Williams	#6	Loss	1–6, 6–2, 6–7^{(3–7)}
Sony Ericsson Open; Key Biscane, Miami; WTA Premier Mandatory; Hard; 23 March - 5 April 2009	–	1R	Bye			
Sony Ericsson Open; Key Biscane, Miami; WTA Premier Mandatory; Hard; 23 March - 5 April 2009	503	2R	(United States) Alexa Glatch	#124	Win	6–2, 6–3
Sony Ericsson Open; Key Biscane, Miami; WTA Premier Mandatory; Hard; 23 March - 5 April 2009	504	3R	(China) Peng Shuai	#34	Win	7–5, 6–2
Sony Ericsson Open; Key Biscane, Miami; WTA Premier Mandatory; Hard; 23 March - 5 April 2009	505	4R	(China) Zheng Jie	#17	Win	7–5, 5–7, 6–3
Sony Ericsson Open; Key Biscane, Miami; WTA Premier Mandatory; Hard; 23 March - 5 April 2009	506	QF	(China) Li Na	#40	Win	4–6, 7–6^{(7–1)}, 6–2
Sony Ericsson Open; Key Biscane, Miami; WTA Premier Mandatory; Hard; 23 March - 5 April 2009	507	SF	(United States) Venus Williams	#6	Win	6–4, 3–6, 6–3
Sony Ericsson Open; Key Biscane, Miami; WTA Premier Mandatory; Hard; 23 March - 5 April 2009	508	F	(Belarus) Victoria Azarenka	#10	Loss	3–6, 1–6
Andalucia Tennis Experience; Marbella, Spain; WTA International; Clay, Red; 6–12 April 2009	509	1R	(Czech Republic) Klára Zakopalová	#95	Loss	4–6, 6–3, 1–6
Internazionali BNL d'Italia; Rome, Italy; WTA Premier 5 Clay, Red; 2–8 May 2009	-	1R	Bye			
Internazionali BNL d'Italia; Rome, Italy; WTA Premier 5 Clay, Red; 2–8 May 2009	510	2R	(Switzerland) Patty Schnyder	#20	Loss	2–6, 6–2, 1–6
Mutua Madrileña Madrid Open; Madrid, Spain; WTA Premier Mandatory; Clay, Red; 9–15 May 2009	511	1R	(Italy) Francesca Schiavone	#45	Loss	4–6, ret
French Open; Paris, France; Grand Slam; Clay, Red; 23 May - 5 June 2009	512	1R	(Czech Republic) Klára Zakopalová	#100	Win	6–3, 6–7^{(7–9)}, 6–4
French Open; Paris, France; Grand Slam; Clay, Red; 23 May - 5 June 2009	513	2R	(Spain) Virginia Ruano Pascual	#133	Win	6–2, 6–0
French Open; Paris, France; Grand Slam; Clay, Red; 23 May - 5 June 2009	514	3R	(Spain) María José Martínez Sánchez	#43	Win	4–6, 6–3, 6–4
French Open; Paris, France; Grand Slam; Clay, Red; 23 May - 5 June 2009	515	4R	(Canada) Aleksandra Wozniak	#24	Win	6–1, 6–2
French Open; Paris, France; Grand Slam; Clay, Red; 23 May - 5 June 2009	516	QF	(Russia) Svetlana Kuznetsova	#7	Loss	6–7^{(3–7)}, 7–5, 5–7
Wimbledon; London, United Kingdom; Grand Slam; Grass; 21 June - 4 July 2009	517	1R	(Portugal) Neuza Silva	#154	Win	6–1, 7–5
Wimbledon; London, United Kingdom; Grand Slam; Grass; 21 June - 4 July 2009	518	2R	(Australia) Jarmila Groth	#69	Win	6–2, 6–1
Wimbledon; London, United Kingdom; Grand Slam; Grass; 21 June - 4 July 2009	519	3R	(Italy) Roberta Vinci	#53	Win	6–3, 6–4
Wimbledon; London, United Kingdom; Grand Slam; Grass; 21 June - 4 July 2009	520	4R	(Slovakia) Daniela Hantuchová	#32	Win	6–3, 6–1
Wimbledon; London, United Kingdom; Grand Slam; Grass; 21 June - 4 July 2009	521	QF	(Belarus) Victoria Azarenka	#8	Win	6–2, 6–3
Wimbledon; London, United Kingdom; Grand Slam; Grass; 21 June - 4 July 2009	522	SF	(Russia) Elena Dementieva	#4	Win	6–7^{(7–9)}, 7–5, 8–6
Wimbledon; London, United Kingdom; Grand Slam; Grass; 21 June - 4 July 2009	523	F	(United States) Venus Williams	#3	Win	7–6^{(7–3)}, 6–2
Bank of the West Classic; Stanford, United States; WTA Premier; Hard, outdoor 27 July - 2 August 2009	524	1R	(China) Li Na	#18	Win	6–3, 7–6^{(8–6)}
Bank of the West Classic; Stanford, United States; WTA Premier; Hard, outdoor 27 July - 2 August 2009	525	2R	(Hungary) Melinda Czink	#56	Win	6–3, 7–6^{(9–7)}
Bank of the West Classic; Stanford, United States; WTA Premier; Hard, outdoor 27 July - 2 August 2009	526	QF	(Australia) Samantha Stosur	#20	Loss	2–6, 6–3, 2–6
Western & Southern Financial Group Women's Open; Cincinnati, United States; WTA Premier 5 Hard, outdoor 10–16 August 2009	-	1R	Bye			
Western & Southern Financial Group Women's Open; Cincinnati, United States; WTA Premier 5 Hard, outdoor 10–16 August 2009	527	2R	(Ukraine) Kateryna Bondarenko	#37	Win	6–3, 6–2
Western & Southern Financial Group Women's Open; Cincinnati, United States; WTA Premier 5 Hard, outdoor 10–16 August 2009	528	3R	(Austria) Sybille Bammer	#29	Loss	5–7, 4–6
Rogers Cup; Toronto, Canada; WTA Premier 5 Hard, outdoor 17–23 August 2009	-	1R	Bye			
Rogers Cup; Toronto, Canada; WTA Premier 5 Hard, outdoor 17–23 August 2009	529	2R	(Kazakhstan) Yaroslava Shvedova	#61	Win	6–3, 6–2
Rogers Cup; Toronto, Canada; WTA Premier 5 Hard, outdoor 17–23 August 2009	530	3R	(Ukraine) Alona Bondarenko	#44	Win	6–1, 6–4
Rogers Cup; Toronto, Canada; WTA Premier 5 Hard, outdoor 17–23 August 2009	531	QF	(Czech Republic) Lucie Šafářová	#46	Win	6–3, 6–2
Rogers Cup; Toronto, Canada; WTA Premier 5 Hard, outdoor 17–23 August 2009	532	SF	(Russia) Elena Dementieva	#5	Loss	6–7^{(2–7)}, 1–6
US Open; New York City, United States; Grand Slam; Hard, outdoor 31 August - 13 September 2009	533	1R	(United States) Alexa Glatch	#103	Win	6–4, 6–1
US Open; New York City, United States; Grand Slam; Hard, outdoor 31 August - 13 September 2009	534	2R	(Hungary) Melinda Czink	#51	Win	6–1, 6–1
US Open; New York City, United States; Grand Slam; Hard, outdoor 31 August - 13 September 2009	535	3R	(Spain) María José Martínez Sánchez	#43	Win	6–3, 7–5
US Open; New York City, United States; Grand Slam; Hard, outdoor 31 August - 13 September 2009	536	4R	(Slovakia) Daniela Hantuchová	#24	Win	6–2, 6–0
US Open; New York City, United States; Grand Slam; Hard, outdoor 31 August - 13 September 2009	537	QF	(Italy) Flavia Pennetta	#10	Win	6–4, 6–3
US Open; New York City, United States; Grand Slam; Hard, outdoor 31 August - 13 September 2009	538	SF	(Belgium) Kim Clijsters	NR	Loss	4–6, 5–7
China Open; Beijing, China; WTA Premier Mandatory; Hard, outdoor 3–9 October 2009	539	1R	(Estonia) Kaia Kanepi	#56	Win	7–5, 6–4
China Open; Beijing, China; WTA Premier Mandatory; Hard, outdoor 3–9 October 2009	540	2R	(Russia) Ekaterina Makarova	#55	Win	6–3, 6–2
China Open; Beijing, China; WTA Premier Mandatory; Hard, outdoor 3–9 October 2009	541	3R	(Russia) Nadia Petrova	#17	Loss	4–6, 6–3, 6–7^{(5–7)}
WTA Tour Championships; Doha, Qatar; Year-End Championship; Hard, indoor 27 October - 1 November 2009	542	RR	(Russia) Svetlana Kuznetsova	#3	Win	7–6^{(8–6)}, 7–5
WTA Tour Championships; Doha, Qatar; Year-End Championship; Hard, indoor 27 October - 1 November 2009	543	RR	(United States) Venus Williams	#7	Win	5–7, 6–4, 7–6^{(7–4)}
WTA Tour Championships; Doha, Qatar; Year-End Championship; Hard, indoor 27 October - 1 November 2009	544	RR	(Russia) Elena Dementieva	#5	Win	6–2, 6–4
WTA Tour Championships; Doha, Qatar; Year-End Championship; Hard, indoor 27 October - 1 November 2009	545	SF	(Denmark) Caroline Wozniacki	#4	Win	6–4, 0–1, ret
WTA Tour Championships; Doha, Qatar; Year-End Championship; Hard, indoor 27 October - 1 November 2009	546	F	(United States) Venus Williams	#7	Win	6–2, 7–6^{(7–4)}

=== Doubles matches ===
Tournament	Match	Round	Partner	Opponents	Rank	Result	Score
Australian Open; Melbourne, Australia; Grand Slam; Hard, outdoor 19 January - 1 February 2009	129	1R	(United States) Venus Williams	(Russia) Svetlana Kuznetsova (Russia) Nadia Petrova	#137 #23	Win	6–3, 6–1
Australian Open; Melbourne, Australia; Grand Slam; Hard, outdoor 19 January - 1 February 2009	130	2R	(United States) Venus Williams	(Japan) Ayumi Morita (Germany) Martina Müller	#70 #100	Win	6–3, 6–3
Australian Open; Melbourne, Australia; Grand Slam; Hard, outdoor 19 January - 1 February 2009	131	3R	(United States) Venus Williams	(Australia) Samantha Stosur (Australia) Rennae Stubbs	#13 #9	Win	6–4, 6–2
Australian Open; Melbourne, Australia; Grand Slam; Hard, outdoor 19 January - 1 February 2009	132	QF	(United States) Venus Williams	(Chinese Taipei) Hsieh Su-wei (China) Peng Shuai	#31 #29	Win	6–2, 4–6, 6–3
Australian Open; Melbourne, Australia; Grand Slam; Hard, outdoor 19 January - 1 February 2009	133	SF	(United States) Venus Williams	(Australia) Casey Dellacqua (Italy) Francesca Schiavone	#20 #32	Win	6–0, 6–2
Australian Open; Melbourne, Australia; Grand Slam; Hard, outdoor 19 January - 1 February 2009	134	F	(United States) Venus Williams	(Slovakia) Daniela Hantuchová (Japan) Ai Sugiyama	#48 #6	Win	6–3, 6–3
French Open; Paris, France; Grand Slam; Clay, Red; 23 May - 5 June 2009	135	1R	(United States) Venus Williams	(Czech Republic) Andrea Hlaváčková (Czech Republic) Lucie Hradecká	#60 #55	Win	6–1, 3–6, 6–3
French Open; Paris, France; Grand Slam; Clay, Red; 23 May - 5 June 2009	136	2R	(United States) Venus Williams	(Argentina) Gisela Dulko (Hungary) Ágnes Szávay	#38 #73	Win	2–6, 6–1, 6–2
French Open; Paris, France; Grand Slam; Clay, Red; 23 May - 5 June 2009	137	3R	(United States) Venus Williams	(United States) Bethanie Mattek-Sands (Russia) Nadia Petrova	#27 #13	Loss	6–7^{(4-7)}, 7–5, 6–7^{(6–8)}
Wimbledon; London, United Kingdom; Grand Slam; Grass; 21 June - 4 July 2009	138	1R	(United States) Venus Williams	(France) Virginie Razzano (France) Aravane Rezaï	#132 #192	Win	6–3, 6–3
Wimbledon; London, United Kingdom; Grand Slam; Grass; 21 June - 4 July 2009	139	2R	(United States) Venus Williams	(Germany) Sabine Lisicki (Canada) Aleksandra Wozniak	#179 #853	Win	6–1, 6–4
Wimbledon; London, United Kingdom; Grand Slam; Grass; 21 June - 4 July 2009	140	3R	(United States) Venus Williams	(China) Yan Zi (China) Zheng Jie	#32 #30	Win	6–0, 6–0
Wimbledon; London, United Kingdom; Grand Slam; Grass; 21 June - 4 July 2009	141	QF	(United States) Venus Williams	(Germany) Anna-Lena Grönefeld (United States) Vania King	#23 #28	Win	6–2, 7–5
Wimbledon; London, United Kingdom; Grand Slam; Grass; 21 June - 4 July 2009	142	SF	(United States) Venus Williams	(Zimbabwe) Cara Black (United States) Liezel Huber	#1 #1	Win	6–1, 6–2
Wimbledon; London, United Kingdom; Grand Slam; Grass; 21 June - 4 July 2009	143	F	(United States) Venus Williams	(Australia) Samantha Stosur (Australia) Rennae Stubbs	#6 #12	Win	7–6^{(7-4)}, 6–4
Bank of the West Classic; Stanford, United States; WTA Premier; Hard, outdoor 27 July - 2 August 2009	144	1R	(United States) Venus Williams	(Chinese Taipei) Chen Yi (United States) Mashona Washington	#130 #114	Win	6–4, 6–2
Bank of the West Classic; Stanford, United States; WTA Premier; Hard, outdoor 27 July - 2 August 2009	145	QF	(United States) Venus Williams	(Latvia) Līga Dekmeijere (United States) Julie Ditty	#69 #68	Win	6–1, 6–0
Bank of the West Classic; Stanford, United States; WTA Premier; Hard, outdoor 27 July - 2 August 2009	146	SF	(United States) Venus Williams	(United States) Bethanie Mattek-Sands (Russia) Nadia Petrova	#27 #12	Win	6–2, 6–2
Bank of the West Classic; Stanford, United States; WTA Premier; Hard, outdoor 27 July - 2 August 2009	147	F	(United States) Venus Williams	(Chinese Taipei) Yung-Jan Chan (Romania) Monica Niculescu	#72 #30	Win	6–4, 6–1
US Open; New York City, United States; Grand Slam; Hard, outdoor 31 August - 13 September 2009	148	1R	(United States) Venus Williams	(Germany) Julia Görges (Spain) Arantxa Parra Santonja	#70 #67	Win	6–2, 6–2
US Open; New York City, United States; Grand Slam; Hard, outdoor 31 August - 13 September 2009	149	2R	(United States) Venus Williams	(Chinese Taipei) Yung-Jan Chan (Slovenia) Katarina Srebotnik	#81 #21	Win	7–5, 6–1
US Open; New York City, United States; Grand Slam; Hard, outdoor 31 August - 13 September 2009	150	3R	(United States) Venus Williams	(Romania) Sorana Cîrstea (Denmark) Caroline Wozniacki	#47 #55	Win	6–4, 6–2
US Open; New York City, United States; Grand Slam; Hard, outdoor 31 August - 13 September 2009	151	QF	(United States) Venus Williams	(China) Yan Zi (China) Zheng Jie	#27 #29	Win	7–5, 6–4
US Open; New York City, United States; Grand Slam; Hard, outdoor 31 August - 13 September 2009	152	SF	(United States) Venus Williams	(Russia) Alisa Kleybanova (Russia) Ekaterina Makarova	#34 #35	Win	7–6^{(7-4)}, 3–6, 6–2
US Open; New York City, United States; Grand Slam; Hard, outdoor 31 August - 13 September 2009	153	F	(United States) Venus Williams	(Zimbabwe) Cara Black (United States) Liezel Huber	#1 #1	Win	6–2, 6–2
WTA Tour Championships; Doha, Qatar; Year-End Championship; Hard, indoor 26 October - 1 November 2009	154	SF	(United States) Venus Williams	(Spain) Nuria Llagostera Vives (Spain) María José Martínez Sánchez	#9 #10	Loss	6–2, 3–6, [8–10]

== Tournament schedule ==
=== Singles schedule ===
Williams' 2009 singles tournament schedule is as follows:

Date	Championship	Location	Category	Surface	Points	Outcome
11 January 2009 – 16 January 2009	Medibank International Sydney	Sydney (AUS)	WTA Premier	Hard	200	Semifinals lost to Elena Dementieva, 3–6, 1–6
19 January 2009 – 1 February 2009	Australian Open	Melbourne (AUS)	Grand Slam	Hard	2000	Winner defeated Dinara Safina, 6–0, 6–3
9 February 2009 – 15 February 2009	Open GDF Suez	Paris (FRA)	WTA Premier	Hard, indoors	200	Semifinals; Withdrew before match against Elena Dementieva
16 February 2009 – 22 February 2009	Dubai Tennis Championships	Dubai (UAE)	WTA Premier 5	Hard	350	Semifinals lost to Venus Williams, 1–6, 6–2, 6–7^{(3-7)}
23 March 2009 – 5 April 2009	Sony Ericsson Open	Miami (USA)	WTA Premier Mandatory	Hard	600	Final lost to Victoria Azarenka 3–6, 1–6
6 April 2009 – 11 April 2009	Andalucia Tennis Experience	Marbella (ESP)	WTA Premier Mandatory	Clay, Red	1	First round lost to Klára Zakopalová 4–6, 6–3, 1–6
2 May 2009 – 8 May 2009	Internazionali BNL d'Italia	Rome (ITA)	WTA Premier 5	Clay, Red	1	Second round lost to Patty Schnyder 2–6, 6–2, 1–6
9 May 2009 – 15 May 2009	Mutua Madrileña Madrid Open	Madrid (ESP)	WTA Premier Mandatory	Clay, Red	5	First round lost to Francesca Schiavone 4–6, ret
24 May 2009 – 6 June 2009	French Open	Paris (FRA)	Grand Slam	Clay	500	Quarterfinals lost to Svetlana Kuznetsova, 6–7^{(3-7)}, 7–5, 5–7
21 June 2009 – 4 July 2009	The Championships, Wimbledon	Wimbledon (GBR)	Grand Slam	Grass	2000	Winner defeated Venus Williams, 7–6^{(7-3)}, 6–2
27 July 2009 – 2 August 2009	Bank of the West Classic	Stanfored (USA)	WTA Premier	Hard	120	Quarterfinals lost to Samantha Stosur 6–2, 3–6, 6–2
10 August 2009 – 16 August 2009	Western & Southern Financial; Women's Open	Dubai (UAE)	WTA Premier 5	Hard	110	Third round lost to Sybille Bammer, 5–7, 4–6
17 August 2009 – 23 August 2009	Rogers Cup	Toronto (CAN)	WTA Premier 5	Hard	350	Semifinals lost to Elena Dementieva, 6–7^{(2-7)}, 1–6
31 August 2009 – 13 September 2009	US Open	New York (USA)	Grand Slam	Hard	900	Semifinals lost to Kim Clijsters, 4–6, 5–7
3 October 2009 – 9 October 2009	China Open	Beijing (CHN)	WTA Premier Mandatory	Hard	140	Third round lost to Nadia Petrova 4–6, 6–3, 6–7^{(5–7)}
26 October 2009 – 1 November 2009	WTA Tour Championships	Doha (QTR)	Year End Championships	Hard, indoors	1,500	Winner defeated Venus Williams 6–2, 7–6^{(7-4)}
Total year-end points					9075	

=== Doubles schedule ===
Williams' 2009 doubles tournament schedule is as follows:

Date	Championship	Location	Category	Partner	Surface	Points	Outcome
19 January 2009– 1 February 2009	Australian Open	Melbourne (AUS)	Grand Slam	(United States) Venus Williams	Hard	2000	Winner defeated Hantuchová/Sugiyama, 6–3, 6–3
24 May 2009– 7 June 2009	French Open	Paris (FRA)	Grand Slam	(United States) Venus Williams	Clay	280	Third Round lost to Mattek-Sands/Petrova, 7–6^{(7-4)}, 5–7, 7–6^{(8–6)}
22 June 2009– 5 July 2009	Championships, Wimbledon	Wimbledon (GBR)	Grand Slam	(United States) Venus Williams	Grass	2000	Winner defeated Stosur/Stubbs, 7–6^{(7-4)}, 6–4
27 July 2009 – 2 August 2009	Bank of the West Classic	Stanfored (USA)	WTA Premier	(United States) Venus Williams	Hard	470	Winner defeated Chan/Niculescu, 6–4, 6–1
31 August 2009 – 13 September 2009	US Open	New York (USA)	Grand Slam	(United States) Venus Williams	Hard	2000	Winner defeated Black/Huber, 6–2, 6–2
26 October 2009 – 1 November 2009	WTA Tour Championships	Doha (QTR)	Year End Championships	(United States) Venus Williams	Hard (i)	690	Semifinals lost to Llagostera Vives/Martínez Sánchez, 2–6, 6–3, [10-8]
Total year-end points						7440	

== Yearly records ==
=== Head-to-head matchups ===
Ordered by percentage of wins

- (Hungary) Melinda Czink 2-0
- (Italy) Sara Errani 2-0
- (United States) Alexa Glatch 2-0
- (Slovakia) Daniela Hantuchová 2-0
- (China) Li Na 2-0
- (Spain) María José Martínez Sánchez 2-0
- (China) Peng Shuai 2-0
- (Denmark) Caroline Wozniacki 2-0
- (China) Zheng Jie 2-0
- (Russia) Dinara Safina 1-0
- (Czech Republic) Iveta Benešová 1-0
- (Croatia) Karolina Šprem 1-0
- (France) Émilie Loit 1-0
- (Serbia) Ana Ivanovic 1-0
- (China) Yuan Meng 1-0
- (Argentina) Gisela Dulko 1-0
- (Spain) Virginia Ruano Pascual 1-0
- (Canada) Aleksandra Wozniak 1-0
- (Portugal) Neuza Silva 1-0
- (Australia) Jarmila Groth 1-0
- (Italy) Roberta Vinci 1-0
- (Ukraine) Kateryna Bondarenko 1-0
- (Kazakhstan) Yaroslava Shvedova 1-0
- (Ukraine) Alona Bondarenko 1-0
- (Czech Republic) Lucie Šafářová 1-0
- (Italy) Flavia Pennetta 1-0
- (Estonia) Kaia Kanepi 1-0
- (Russia) Ekaterina Makarova 1-0
- (United States) Venus Williams 4-1
- (Belarus) Victoria Azarenka 2-1
- (Russia) Svetlana Kuznetsova 2-1
- (Russia) Elena Dementieva 3-2
- (Australia) Samantha Stosur 1-1
- (Czech Republic) Klára Zakopalová 1-1
- (Switzerland) Patty Schnyder 0-1
- (Italy) Francesca Schiavone 0-1
- (Austria) Sybille Bammer 0-1
- (Belgium) Kim Clijsters 0-1
- (Russia) Nadia Petrova 0-1

=== Finals ===
==== Singles: 4 (3–1) ====
Legend Grand Slam (2–0) Year-End Championships (1–0) WTA Premier Mandatory (0–1)	Finals by surface Hard (2–1) Grass (1–0)	Finals by venue Outdoors (2–1) Indoors (1–0)

Outcome	No.	Date	Championship	Surface	Opponent in the final	Score in the final
Winner	33.	January 31, 2009	Australian Open, Melbourne, Australia (4)	Hard	(Russia) Dinara Safina	6–0, 6–3
Runner-up	13.	April 5, 2009	Miami, US (2)	Hard	(Belarus) Victoria Azarenka	3–6, 1–6
Winner	34.	July 5, 2009	Wimbledon, London, UK (3)	Grass	(United States) Venus Williams	7–6^{(7–3)}, 6–2
Winner	35.	November 1, 2009	WTA Tour Championships, Doha, Qatar (2)	Hard (i)	(United States) Venus Williams	6–2, 7–6^{(7–4)}

==== Doubles: 4 (4–0) ====
Legend Grand Slam (3–0) Premier (1–0)	Finals by surface Hard (3–0) Grass (1–0)	Finals by venue Outdoors (4–0)

Outcome	No.	Date	Championship	Surface	Partner	Opponent in the final	Score in the final
Winner	14.	January 30, 2009	Australian Open, Melbourne, Australia (3)	Hard	(United States) Venus Williams	(Japan) Ai Sugiyama (Slovakia) Daniela Hantuchová	6–3, 6–3
Winner	15.	July 4, 2009	Wimbledon, London, UK (4)	Grass	(United States) Venus Williams	(Australia) Samantha Stosur (Australia) Rennae Stubbs	7–6^{(7–4)}, 6–4
Winner	16.	August 2, 2009	Stanford, US (1)	Hard	(United States) Venus Williams	(Chinese Taipei) Chan Yung-jan (Romania) Monica Niculescu	6–4, 6–1
Winner	17.	September 14, 2009	US Open, New York City, US (2)	Hard	(United States) Venus Williams	(Zimbabwe) Cara Black (United States) Liezel Huber	6–2, 6–2

=== Earnings ===
#	Event	Prize money	Year-to-date
1	Medibank International Sydney	$28,100	$28,100
2	Australian Open	$1,373,604	$1,401,704
2	Australian Open (doubles)	$154,531	$1,556,235
3	Open GDF Suez	$22,962	$1,579,197
4	Dubai Tennis Championships	$87,500	$1,666,697
5	Sony Ericsson Open	$350,000	$2,016,697
6	Andalucia Tennis Experience	$2,707	$2,019,404
7	Internazionali BNL d'Italia	$10,275	$2,029,679
8	Mutua Madrileña Madrid Open	$12,002	$2,041,681
9	French Open	$187,185	$2,228,866
9	French Open (doubles)	$14,975	$2,243,841
10	Wimbledon	$1,456,627	$3,700,468
10	Wimbledon (doubles)	$197,073	$3,897,541
11	Bank of the West Classic	$15,925	$3,913,466
11	Bank of the West Classic (doubles)	$17,000	$3,930,466
12	Western & Southern Financial Group Women's Open	$20,000	$3,950,466
13	Rogers Cup	$87,500	$4,037,966
14	US Open	$342,825	$4,380,791
14	US Open (doubles)	$205,695	$4,586,486
15	China Open	$37,225	$4,623,711
16	WTA Tour Championships	$1,550,000	$6,173,711
16	WTA Tour Championships (doubles)	$46,875	$6,220,586
Bonus Pool		$175,000	$6,545,586
			$6,545,586

Figures in United States dollars (USD) unless noted.

== See also ==
- Venus Williams
- 2009 WTA Tour

Sporting positions
Preceded by Venus Williams; Angelique Kerber	World No. 1 First stint: July 8, 2002 – August 10, 2003; Last stint: April 24, 2017 – May 14, 2017	Succeeded by Kim Clijsters; Angelique Kerber
Preceded by Jennifer Capriati; Justine Henin; Petra Kvitová	Year-end World No. 1; 2002; 2008, 2009; 2012 – 2015	Succeeded by Justine Henin; Kim Clijsters; Angelique Kerber
Awards
Preceded by Jennifer Capriati; Jelena Janković; Petra Kvitová	ITF Women's Singles World Champion; 2002; 2009; 2012 – 2015	Succeeded by Justine Henin; Caroline Wozniacki; Angelique Kerber
Preceded by Martina Hingis & Anna Kournikova; Cara Black & Liezel Huber	WTA Doubles Team of the Year; 2000 (with Venus Williams); 2009 (with Venus Williams)	Succeeded by Lisa Raymond & Rennae Stubbs; Gisela Dulko & Flavia Pennetta
Preceded by Cara Black & Liezel Huber	ITF Women's Doubles World Champion; 2009 (with Venus Williams)	Succeeded by Gisela Dulko & Flavia Pennetta
