= 2009 ATP World Tour Masters 1000 =

Men's professional tennis tour

2009 ATP Masters 1000
Details
- Duration: March 12 – November 15
- Edition: 20th
- Tournaments: 9

Achievements (singles)
- Most titles: (Spain) Rafael Nadal (3)
- Most finals: (Spain) Rafael Nadal (Serbia) Novak Djokovic (5)

The twentieth edition of the ATP Masters Series. The champion of each Masters event is awarded 1,000 rankings points.

== Tournaments ==
Tournament	Country	Location	Surface	Prize money
Indian Wells Masters	USA	Indian Wells, California	Hard	$4,615,170
Miami Open	USA	Key Biscayne, Florida	Hard	$4,500,000
Monte-Carlo Masters	France	Roquebrune-Cap-Martin	Clay	€2,750,000
Madrid Open	Spain	Madrid	Clay	€2,750,000
Italian Open	Italy	Rome	Clay	€3,700,000
Canadian Open	Canada	Montreal	Hard	$3,000,000
Cincinnati Masters	USA	Mason, Ohio	Hard	$3,000,000
Shanghai Masters	China	Shanghai	Hard	$5,250,000
Paris Masters	France	Paris	Hard (indoor)	€2,750,000

== Results ==
* First-time champion

Masters	Singles champions	Runners-up	Score	Doubles champions	Runners-up	Score
Indian Wells Singles – Doubles	(Spain) Rafael Nadal	(United Kingdom) Andy Murray	6–1, 6–2	(United States) Mardy Fish* (United States) Andy Roddick*	(Belarus) Max Mirnyi (Israel) Andy Ram	3–6, 6–1, [14–12]
Miami Singles – Doubles	(United Kingdom) Andy Murray	(Serbia) Novak Djokovic	6–2, 7–5	(Belarus) Max Mirnyi (Israel) Andy Ram	(Australia) Ashley Fisher (Australia) Stephen Huss	6–7^{(4–7)}, 6–2, [10–7]
Monte Carlo Singles – Doubles	(Spain) Rafael Nadal	(Serbia) Novak Djokovic	6–3, 2–6, 6–1	(Canada) Daniel Nestor (Serbia) Nenad Zimonjić	(United States) Bob Bryan (United States) Mike Bryan	6–4, 6–1
Rome Singles – Doubles	(Spain) Rafael Nadal	(Serbia) Novak Djokovic	7–6^{(7–2)}, 6–2	(Canada) Daniel Nestor (Serbia) Nenad Zimonjić	(United States) Bob Bryan (United States) Mike Bryan	7–6^{(7–5)}, 6–3
Madrid Singles – Doubles	(Switzerland) Roger Federer	(Spain) Rafael Nadal	6–4, 6–4	(Canada) Daniel Nestor (Serbia) Nenad Zimonjić	(Sweden) Simon Aspelin (South Africa) Wesley Moodie	6–4, 6–4
Montreal Singles – Doubles	(United Kingdom) Andy Murray	(Argentina) Juan Martín del Potro	6–7^{(4–7)}, 7–6^{(7–3)}, 6–1	(India) Mahesh Bhupathi (The Bahamas) Mark Knowles	(Belarus) Max Mirnyi (Israel) Andy Ram	6–4, 6–3
Cincinnati Singles – Doubles	(Switzerland) Roger Federer	(Serbia) Novak Djokovic	6–1, 7–5	(Canada) Daniel Nestor (Serbia) Nenad Zimonjić	(United States) Bob Bryan (United States) Mike Bryan	3–6, 7–6^{(7–2)}, [15–13]
Shanghai Singles – Doubles	(Russia) Nikolay Davydenko	(Spain) Rafael Nadal	7–6^{(7–3)}, 6–3	(France) Jo-Wilfried Tsonga* (France) Julien Benneteau*	(Poland) Mariusz Fyrstenberg (Poland) Marcin Matkowski	6–2, 6–4
Paris Singles – Doubles	(Serbia) Novak Djokovic	(France) Gaël Monfils	6–2, 5–7, 7–6^{(7–3)}	(Canada) Daniel Nestor (Serbia) Nenad Zimonjić	(Spain) Marcel Granollers (Spain) Tommy Robredo	6–3, 6–4

== Tournament details ==
Key

- Q = Qualifier
- WC = Wild card
- LL = Lucky loser
- Alt = Alternate
- ITF = ITF entry
- PR = Protected ranking
- SR = Special ranking
- SE = Special exempt
- JE = Junior exempt
- JR = Junior Accelerator Programme entrant
- CO = College Accelerator Programme entrant
- NG = Next Gen Accelerator Program entrant
- w/o = Walkover
- r = Retired
- d = Defaulted

=== Indian Wells Masters ===
==== Singles ====
Quarterfinals
1	(Spain) Rafael Nadal	6	6
6	(Argentina) Juan Martín del Potro	2	4
3	(Serbia) Novak Djokovic	3	2
7	(United States) Andy Roddick	6	6
(Croatia) Ivan Ljubičić	5	6^{6}
4	(United Kingdom) Andy Murray	7	7
10	(Spain) Fernando Verdasco	3	6^{5}
2	(Switzerland) Roger Federer	6	7

Semifinals
1	(Spain) Rafael Nadal	6	7
7	(United States) Andy Roddick	4	6^{4}
4	(United Kingdom) Andy Murray	6	4	6
2	(Switzerland) Roger Federer	3	6	1

Final
1	(Spain) Rafael Nadal	6	6
4	(United Kingdom) Andy Murray	1	2

==== Doubles ====
Semifinals
1	(United States) Bob Bryan (United States) Mike Bryan	2	4
(Belarus) Max Mirnyi (Israel) Andy Ram	6	6
(United States) Mardy Fish (United States) Andy Roddick	6	7
(France) Richard Gasquet (Switzerland) Stanislas Wawrinka	4	6^{4}

Final
(Belarus) Max Mirnyi (Israel) Andy Ram	6	1	[12]
(United States) Mardy Fish (United States) Andy Roddick	3	6	[14]

=== Miami Open ===
==== Singles ====
Quarterfinals
1	(Spain) Rafael Nadal	4	6	6^{3}
6	(Argentina) Juan Martín del Potro	6	3	7
4	(United Kingdom) Andy Murray	6	6
8	(Spain) Fernando Verdasco	1	2
10	(France) Jo-Wilfried Tsonga	3	4
3	(Serbia) Novak Djokovic	6	6
5	(United States) Andy Roddick	3	6	4
2	(Switzerland) Roger Federer	6	4	6

Semifinals
6	(Argentina) Juan Martín del Potro	1	7	2
4	(United Kingdom) Andy Murray	6	5	6
3	(Serbia) Novak Djokovic	3	6	6
2	(Switzerland) Roger Federer	6	2	3

Final
4	(United Kingdom) Andy Murray	6	7
3	(Serbia) Novak Djokovic	2	5

==== Doubles ====
Semifinals
1	(United States) Bob Bryan (United States) Mike Bryan	6^{6}	4
(Australia) Ashley Fisher (Australia) Stephen Huss	7	6
(Belarus) Max Mirnyi (Israel) Andy Ram	4	7	[10]
(Austria) Julian Knowle (Austria) Jürgen Melzer	6	6^{8}	[6]

Final
(Australia) Ashley Fisher (Australia) Stephen Huss	7	2	[7]
(Belarus) Max Mirnyi (Israel) Andy Ram	6^{4}	6	[10]

=== Monte-Carlo Masters ===
==== Singles ====
Quarterfinals
1	(Spain) Rafael Nadal	6	6
WC	(Croatia) Ivan Ljubičić	3	3
4	(United Kingdom) Andy Murray	7	6
8	(Russia) Nikolay Davydenko	6^{1}	4
7	(Spain) Fernando Verdasco	2	6	3
3	(Serbia) Novak Djokovic	6	4	6
Q	(Germany) Andreas Beck	2	4
13	(Switzerland) Stanislas Wawrinka	6	6

Semifinals
1	(Spain) Rafael Nadal	6	7
4	(United Kingdom) Andy Murray	2	6^{4}
3	(Serbia) Novak Djokovic	4	6	6
13	(Switzerland) Stanislas Wawrinka	6	1	3

Final
1	(Spain) Rafael Nadal	6	2	6
3	(Serbia) Novak Djokovic	3	6	1

==== Doubles ====
Semifinals
1	(United States) Bob Bryan (United States) Mike Bryan	6^{3}	6	[14]
3	(Czech Republic) Lukáš Dlouhý (India) Leander Paes	7	3	[12]
(Serbia) Novak Djokovic (Serbia) Viktor Troicki	6	1	[5]
2	(Canada) Daniel Nestor (Serbia) Nenad Zimonjić	3	6	[10]

Final
1	(United States) Bob Bryan (United States) Mike Bryan	4	1
2	(Canada) Daniel Nestor (Serbia) Nenad Zimonjić	6	6

=== Italian Open ===
==== Singles ====
Quarterfinals
1	(Spain) Rafael Nadal	6	6
6	(Spain) Fernando Verdasco	3	3
Q	(Argentina) Juan Mónaco	6	3	4
12	(Chile) Fernando González	2	6	6
5	(Argentina) Juan Martín del Potro	3	4
3	(Serbia) Novak Djokovic	6	6
Q	(Germany) Mischa Zverev	6^{3}	2
2	(Switzerland) Roger Federer	7	6

Semifinals
1	(Spain) Rafael Nadal	6	6
12	(Chile) Fernando González	3	3
3	(Serbia) Novak Djokovic	4	6	6
2	(Switzerland) Roger Federer	6	3	3

Final
1	(Spain) Rafael Nadal	7	6
3	(Serbia) Novak Djokovic	6^{2}	2

==== Doubles ====
Semifinals
1	(United States) Bob Bryan (United States) Mike Bryan	6	3	[10]
5	(Brazil) Bruno Soares (Zimbabwe) Kevin Ullyett	1	6	[7]
4	(India) Mahesh Bhupathi (The Bahamas) Mark Knowles	4	7	[8]
2	(Canada) Daniel Nestor (Serbia) Nenad Zimonjić	6	6^{6}	[10]

Final
1	(United States) Bob Bryan (United States) Mike Bryan	6^{5}	3
2	(Canada) Daniel Nestor (Serbia) Nenad Zimonjić	7	6

=== Madrid ===
==== Singles ====
Quarterfinals
1	(Spain) Rafael Nadal	6	7
7	(Spain) Fernando Verdasco	4	5
3	(Serbia) Novak Djokovic	6	6
WC	(Croatia) Ivan Ljubičić	4	4
5	(Argentina) Juan Martín del Potro	7	6
4	(United Kingdom) Andy Murray	6^{4}	3
6	(United States) Andy Roddick	5	7	1
2	(Switzerland) Roger Federer	7	6^{5}	6

Semifinals
1	(Spain) Rafael Nadal	3	7	7
3	(Serbia) Novak Djokovic	6	6^{5}	6^{9}
5	(Argentina) Juan Martín del Potro	3	4
2	(Switzerland) Roger Federer	6	6

Final
1	(Spain) Rafael Nadal	4	4
2	(Switzerland) Roger Federer	6	6

==== Doubles ====
Semifinals
(Sweden) Simon Aspelin (South Africa) Wesley Moodie	3	7	[10]
5	(Brazil) Bruno Soares (Zimbabwe) Kevin Ullyett	6	6^{3}	[6]
(Argentina) Juan Martín del Potro (United States) Mardy Fish	4	3
2	(Canada) Daniel Nestor (Serbia) Nenad Zimonjić	6	6

Final
(Sweden) Simon Aspelin (South Africa) Wesley Moodie	4	4
2	(Canada) Daniel Nestor (Serbia) Nenad Zimonjić	6	6

=== Canadian Open ===
==== Singles ====
Quarterfinals
1	(Switzerland) Roger Federer	6^{5}	6	6^{3}
7	(France) Jo-Wilfried Tsonga	7	1	7
3	(United Kingdom) Andy Murray	6	6
8	(Russia) Nikolay Davydenko	2	4
5	(United States) Andy Roddick	6	7
4	(Serbia) Novak Djokovic	4	6^{4}
6	(Argentina) Juan Martín del Potro	7	6
2	(Spain) Rafael Nadal	6^{5}	1

Semifinals
7	(France) Jo-Wilfried Tsonga	4	6^{8}
3	(United Kingdom) Andy Murray	6	7
5	(United States) Andy Roddick	6	2	5
6	(Argentina) Juan Martín del Potro	4	6	7

Final
3	(United Kingdom) Andy Murray	6^{4}	7	6
6	(Argentina) Juan Martín del Potro	7	6^{3}	1

==== Doubles ====
Semifinals
1	(United States) Bob Bryan (United States) Mike Bryan	6^{5}	2
7	(Belarus) Max Mirnyi (Israel) Andy Ram	7	6
3	(India) Mahesh Bhupathi (The Bahamas) Mark Knowles	5	6	[10]
2	(Canada) Daniel Nestor (Serbia) Nenad Zimonjić	7	2	[4]

Final
7	(Belarus) Max Mirnyi (Israel) Andy Ram	4	3
3	(India) Mahesh Bhupathi (The Bahamas) Mark Knowles	6	6

=== Cincinnati Masters ===
==== Singles ====
Quarterfinals
1	(Switzerland) Roger Federer	6	6
(Australia) Lleyton Hewitt	3	4
3	(United Kingdom) Andy Murray	4	6	6
LL	(France) Julien Benneteau	6	3	1
9	(France) Gilles Simon	4	5
4	(Serbia) Novak Djokovic	6	7
(Czech Republic) Tomáš Berdych	4	5
2	(Spain) Rafael Nadal	6	7

Semifinals
1	(Switzerland) Roger Federer	6	7
3	(United Kingdom) Andy Murray	2	6^{8}
4	(Serbia) Novak Djokovic	6	6
2	(Spain) Rafael Nadal	1	4

Final
1	(Switzerland) Roger Federer	6	7
4	(Serbia) Novak Djokovic	1	5

==== Doubles ====
Semifinals
1	(United States) Bob Bryan (United States) Mike Bryan	0	6	[10]
8	(Poland) Łukasz Kubot (Austria) Oliver Marach	6	4	[4]
4	(India) Mahesh Bhupathi (The Bahamas) Mark Knowles	4	3
2	(Canada) Daniel Nestor (Serbia) Nenad Zimonjić	6	6

Final
1	(United States) Bob Bryan (United States) Mike Bryan	6	6^{2}	[13]
2	(Canada) Daniel Nestor (Serbia) Nenad Zimonjić	3	7	[15]

=== Shanghai Masters ===
==== Singles ====
Quarterfinals
1	(Spain) Rafael Nadal	3	6	0
(Croatia) Ivan Ljubičić	6	3	0^{r}
(Spain) Feliciano López	7	6
9	(Sweden) Robin Söderling	6^{4}	3
6	(Russia) Nikolay Davydenko	6	4	6
13	(Czech Republic) Radek Štěpánek	1	6	1
8	(France) Gilles Simon	3	6	2
2	(Serbia) Novak Djokovic	6	2	6

Semifinals
1	(Spain) Rafael Nadal	6	3
(Spain) Feliciano López	1	0^{r}
6	(Russia) Nikolay Davydenko	4	6	7
2	(Serbia) Novak Djokovic	6	4	6^{1}

Final
1	(Spain) Rafael Nadal	6^{3}	3
6	(Russia) Nikolay Davydenko	7	6

==== Doubles ====
Semifinals
(France) Julien Benneteau (France) Jo-Wilfried Tsonga	7	6
3	(India) Mahesh Bhupathi (The Bahamas) Mark Knowles	6^{2}	2
(Austria) Julian Knowle (Austria) Jürgen Melzer	1	4
6	(Poland) Mariusz Fyrstenberg (Poland) Marcin Matkowski	6	6

Final
(France) Julien Benneteau (France) Jo-Wilfried Tsonga	6	6
6	(Poland) Mariusz Fyrstenberg (Poland) Marcin Matkowski	2	4

=== Paris Masters ===
==== Singles ====
Quarterfinals
15	(France) Gaël Monfils	3	6	6
12	(Croatia) Marin Čilić	6	4	4
13	(Czech Republic) Radek Štěpánek	4
5	(Argentina) Juan Martín del Potro	0^{r}
9	(Sweden) Robin Söderling	4	6	3
3	(Serbia) Novak Djokovic	6	1	6
8	(France) Jo-Wilfried Tsonga	5	5
2	(Spain) Rafael Nadal	7	7

Semifinals
15	(France) Gaël Monfils	6	5	6
13	(Czech Republic) Radek Štěpánek	4	7	4
3	(Serbia) Novak Djokovic	6	6
2	(Spain) Rafael Nadal	2	3

Final
15	(France) Gaël Monfils	2	7	6^{3}
3	(Serbia) Novak Djokovic	6	5	7

==== Doubles ====
Semifinals
1	(Canada) Daniel Nestor (Serbia) Nenad Zimonjić	6^{2}	6	[10]
8	(Czech Republic) František Čermák (Slovakia) Michal Mertiňák	7	4	[2]
(Spain) Marcel Granollers (Spain) Tommy Robredo	6	6
7	(Poland) Mariusz Fyrstenberg (Poland) Marcin Matkowski	4	2

Final
1	(Canada) Daniel Nestor (Serbia) Nenad Zimonjić	6	6
(Spain) Marcel Granollers (Spain) Tommy Robredo	3	4

== See also ==
- ATP Tour Masters 1000
- 2009 ATP Tour
- 2009 WTA Premier Mandatory and Premier 5 tournaments
- 2009 WTA Tour
