= 2009 WTA Premier Mandatory and Premier 5 tournaments =

Women's professional tennis tour

2009 Premier Mandatory / Premier 5
Details
- Duration: February 16 – October 11
- Edition: 20th
- Tournaments: 9

Achievements (singles)
- Most titles: (Russia) Dinara Safina (2)
- Most finals: (Russia) Dinara Safina (3)

The WTA Premier Mandatory and Premier 5 tournaments, which are part of the WTA Premier tournaments, make up the elite tour for professional women's tennis organised by the WTA called the WTA Tour. There are four Premier Mandatory tournaments: Indian Wells, Miami, Madrid and Beijing and five Premier 5 tournaments: Dubai, Rome, Cincinnati, Canada and Tokyo.

== Tournaments ==
Tournament	Country	Location	Surface	Date	Prize money
Barclays Dubai Tennis Championships	United Arab Emirates	Dubai	Hard	Feb 16 – 22	$2,000,000
BNP Paribas Open	United States	Indian Wells	Hard	Mar 9 – 22	$4,500,000
Sony Ericsson Open	United States	Key Biscayne	Hard	Mar 23 – Apr 5	$4,500,000
Internazionali BNL d'Italia	Italy	Rome	Clay (red)	May 4 – 10	$2,000,000
Mutua Madrileña Madrid Open	Spain	Madrid	Clay (red)	May 11 – 17	$4,500,000
W&S Financial Group Women's Open	United States	Mason	Hard	Aug 10 – 16	$2,000,000
Rogers Cup	Canada	Toronto	Hard	Aug 17 – 24	$2,000,000
Toray Pan Pacific Open	Japan	Tokyo	Hard	Sep 28 – Oct 4	$2,000,000
China Open	China	Beijing	Hard	Oct 5 – 11	$4,500,000

== Results ==
* First-time champion

Tournament	Singles champions	Runners-up	Score	Doubles champions	Runners-up	Score
Dubai Singles – Doubles	(United States) Venus Williams	(France) Virginie Razzano	6–4, 6–2	(Zimbabwe) Cara Black (United States) Liezel Huber	(Russia) Maria Kirilenko (Poland) Agnieszka Radwańska	6–3, 6–3
Indian Wells Singles – Doubles	(Russia) Vera Zvonareva*	(Serbia) Ana Ivanovic	7–6^{(7–5)}, 6–2	(Belarus) Victoria Azarenka*	(Argentina) Gisela Dulko (Israel) Shahar Pe'er	6–4, 3–6, [10–5]
Indian Wells Singles – Doubles	(Russia) Vera Zvonareva*	(Serbia) Ana Ivanovic	7–6^{(7–5)}, 6–2	(Russia) Vera Zvonareva	(Argentina) Gisela Dulko (Israel) Shahar Pe'er	6–4, 3–6, [10–5]
Miami Singles – Doubles	(Belarus) Victoria Azarenka*	(United States) Serena Williams	6–3, 6–1	(Russia) Svetlana Kuznetsova	(Czech Republic) Květa Peschke (United States) Lisa Raymond	4–6, 6–1, [10–3]
Miami Singles – Doubles	(Belarus) Victoria Azarenka*	(United States) Serena Williams	6–3, 6–1	(France) Amélie Mauresmo*	(Czech Republic) Květa Peschke (United States) Lisa Raymond	4–6, 6–1, [10–3]
Rome Singles – Doubles	(Russia) Dinara Safina	(Russia) Svetlana Kuznetsova	6–3, 6–2	(Chinese Taipei) Hsieh Su-wei* (China) Peng Shuai*	(Slovakia) Daniela Hantuchová (Japan) Ai Sugiyama	7–5, 7–6^{(7–5)}
Madrid Singles – Doubles	(Russia) Dinara Safina (2)	(Denmark) Caroline Wozniacki	6–2, 6–4	(Zimbabwe) Cara Black (2) (United States) Liezel Huber (2)	(Czech Republic) Květa Peschke (United States) Lisa Raymond	4–6, 6–3, [10–6]
Cincinnati Singles – Doubles	(Serbia) Jelena Janković	(Russia) Dinara Safina	6–4, 6–2	(Zimbabwe) Cara Black (3) (United States) Liezel Huber (3)	(Spain) Nuria Llagostera Vives (Spain) María José Martínez Sánchez	6–3, 0–6, [10–2]
Toronto Singles – Doubles	(Russia) Elena Dementieva	(Russia) Maria Sharapova	6–4, 6–3	(Spain) Nuria Llagostera Vives* (Spain) María José Martínez Sánchez*	(Australia) Samantha Stosur (Australia) Rennae Stubbs	2–6, 7–5, [11–9]
Tokyo Singles – Doubles	(Russia) Maria Sharapova	(Serbia) Jelena Janković	5–2, ret.	(Russia) Alisa Kleybanova*	(Slovakia) Daniela Hantuchová (Japan) Ai Sugiyama	6–4, 6–2
Tokyo Singles – Doubles	(Russia) Maria Sharapova	(Serbia) Jelena Janković	5–2, ret.	(Italy) Francesca Schiavone	(Slovakia) Daniela Hantuchová (Japan) Ai Sugiyama	6–4, 6–2
Beijing Singles – Doubles	(Russia) Svetlana Kuznetsova	(Poland) Agnieszka Radwańska	6–2, 6–4	(Chinese Taipei) Hsieh Su-wei (2) (China) Peng Shuai (2)	(Russia) Alla Kudryavtseva (Russia) Ekaterina Makarova	6–3, 6–1

== See also ==
- WTA Premier tournaments
- 2009 WTA Tour
- 2009 ATP Masters 1000
- 2009 ATP Tour
