= 2009 Bank of the West Classic – Singles =

Singles
- 2009 Bank of the West Classic

Final
- Champion: (France) Marion Bartoli
- Runner-up: (United States) Venus Williams
- Score: 6–2, 5–7, 6–4

Details
- Draw: 32
- Seeds: 8

Events
Singles	Doubles
- Bank of the West Classic

Aleksandra Wozniak was the defending champion, but lost to Daniela Hantuchová in the first round.

Marion Bartoli reached her second straight final and won the title, defeating Venus Williams 6–2, 5–7, 6–4.

== Seeds ==
1. (United States) Serena Williams (quarterfinals)
2. (United States) Venus Williams (final)
3. (Russia) Elena Dementieva (semifinals)
4. (Serbia) Jelena Janković (quarterfinals)
5. (Russia) Nadia Petrova (second round)
6. (Slovakia) Dominika Cibulková (first round)
7. (Poland) Agnieszka Radwańska (second round)
8. (France) Marion Bartoli (champion)

== Main draw ==
Key

- Q = Qualifier
- WC = Wild card
- LL = Lucky loser
- Alt = Alternate
- ITF = ITF entry
- PR = Protected ranking
- SR = Special ranking
- SE = Special exempt
- JE = Junior exempt
- JR = Junior Accelerator Programme entrant
- CO = College Accelerator Programme entrant
- NG = Next Gen Accelerator Program entrant
- w/o = Walkover
- r = Retired
- d = Defaulted

=== Finals ===
Semifinals
(Australia) Samantha Stosur	3	6	1
8	(France) Marion Bartoli	6	1	6
3	(Russia) Elena Dementieva	0	1
2	(United States) Venus Williams	6	6

Final
8	(France) Marion Bartoli	6	5	6
2	(United States) Venus Williams	2	7	4

=== Top half ===
First round
1	(United States) S Williams	6	7^{8}
(China) N Li	3	6^{6}
(Russia) A Kleybanova	0	5
(Hungary) M Czink	6	7
(Romania) M Niculescu	6	6
(United States) M Shaughnessy	1	0
(Australia) S Stosur	6	6
6	(Slovakia) D Cibulková	4	3
4	(Serbia) J Janković	6	6
Q	(United States) A Haynes	3	1
Q	(United States) L Osterloh	2	3
(Germany) S Lisicki	6	6
WC	(United States) H Barte	2	1
Q	(United States) M Oudin	6	6
(Japan) A Morita	6^{6}	3
8	(France) M Bartoli	7^{8}	6

Second round
1	(United States) S Williams	6	7^{9}
(Hungary) M Czink	3	6^{7}
(Romania) M Niculescu	1	5
(Australia) S Stosur	6	7
4	(Serbia) J Janković	2	6	6
(Germany) S Lisicki	6	2	4
Q	(United States) M Oudin	5	4
8	(France) M Bartoli	7	6

Quarterfinals
1	(United States) S Williams	2	6	2
(Australia) S Stosur	6	3	6
4	(Serbia) J Janković	6	6^{3}	3
8	(France) M Bartoli	3	7^{7}	6

Semifinals
(Australia) S Stosur	3	6	1
8	(France) M Bartoli	6	1	6

=== Bottom half ===
First round
7	(Poland) A Radwańska	6	6
(Romania) S Cîrstea	0	1
(Slovakia) D Hantuchová	6	4	7
(Canada) A Wozniak	4	6	5
(Russia) A Chakvetadze	4	7	6^{5}
(Russia) M Kirilenko	6	5	7^{7}
(United Kingdom) A Keothavong	1	4
3	(Russia) E Dementieva	6	6
5	(Russia) N Petrova	6	3	6
(United States) B Mattek-Sands	3	6	3
(Russia) M Sharapova	6	6^{6}	6
(Japan) A Sugiyama	4	7^{8}	1
Q	(Russia) A Kudryavtseva	6	7^{7}
(France) J Coin	1	6^{5}
WC	(Canada) S Dubois	2	3
2	(United States) V Williams	6	6

Second round
7	(Poland) A Radwańska	6	6^{6}	1
(Slovakia) D Hantuchová	4	7^{8}	6
(Russia) M Kirilenko	1	2
3	(Russia) E Dementieva	6	6
5	(Russia) N Petrova	1	2
(Russia) M Sharapova	6	6
Q	(Russia) A Kudryavtseva	1	5
2	(United States) V Williams	6	7

Quarterfinals
(Slovakia) D Hantuchová	2	4
3	(Russia) E Dementieva	6	6
(Russia) M Sharapova	2	2
2	(United States) V Williams	6	6

Semifinals
3	(Russia) E Dementieva	0	1
2	(United States) V Williams	6	6
