= 2009 Bank of the West Classic – Doubles =

Doubles
- 2009 Bank of the West Classic

Final
- Champions: (United States) Serena Williams (United States) Venus Williams
- Runners-up: (Chinese Taipei) Yung-Jan Chan (Romania) Monica Niculescu
- Score: 6–4, 6–1

Details
- Draw: 16
- Seeds: 4

Events
Singles	Doubles
- Bank of the West Classic

Cara Black and Liezel Huber were the defending champions, but lost in the quarterfinals to Yung-Jan Chan and Monica Niculescu.

Serena Williams and Venus Williams won in the final, 6–4, 6–1, against Yung-Jan Chan and Monica Niculescu.

== Seeds ==
1. (Zimbabwe) Cara Black / (United States) Liezel Huber (quarterfinals)
2. (United States) Serena Williams / (United States) Venus Williams (champions)
3. (United States) Bethanie Mattek-Sands / (Russia) Nadia Petrova (semifinals)
4. (Romania) Sorana Cîrstea / (Russia) Maria Kirilenko (semifinals)

== Draw ==
Key

- Q = Qualifier
- WC = Wild card
- LL = Lucky loser
- Alt = Alternate
- ITF = ITF entry
- PR = Protected ranking
- SR = Special ranking
- SE = Special exempt
- JE = Junior exempt
- JR = Junior Accelerator Programme entrant
- CO = College Accelerator Programme entrant
- NG = Next Gen Accelerator Program entrant
- w/o = Walkover
- r = Retired
- d = Defaulted

=== Draw ===
First round
1	(Zimbabwe) C Black (United States) L Huber	6	6
(United States) A Haynes (Ukraine) O Savchuk	1	3
(Chinese Taipei) Y-j Chan (Romania) M Niculescu	6	2	[10]
(France) S Foretz (United States) A Spears	4	6	[6]
4	(Romania) S Cîrstea (Russia) M Kirilenko	5	6	[10]
(United States) L Granville (United States) C Gullickson	7	3	[5]
(United Kingdom) A Keothavong (Japan) A Morita	6	3	r
(France) J Coin (Canada) M-È Pelletier	4	5
(Russia) A Kleybanova (Russia) A Rodionova	6	6
(United States) J Craybas (Chinese Taipei) S-W Hsieh	2	2
(Russia) A Kudryavtseva (Belarus) T Poutchek	6	4	[4]
3	(United States) B Mattek-Sands (Russia) N Petrova	4	6	[10]
(Latvia) L Dekmeijere (United States) J Ditty	6	7
WC	(United States) H Barte (United States) L Burdette	4	6^{5}
ALT	(Chinese Taipei) Y Chen (United States) M Washington	4	2
2	(United States) S Williams (United States) V Williams	6	6

Quarterfinals
1	(Zimbabwe) C Black (United States) L Huber	5	3
(Chinese Taipei) Y-j Chan (Romania) M Niculescu	7	6
4	(Romania) S Cîrstea (Russia) M Kirilenko	6	6
(France) J Coin (Canada) M-È Pelletier	3	3
(Russia) A Kleybanova (Russia) A Rodionova	4	6	[10]
3	(United States) B Mattek-Sands (Russia) N Petrova	6	4	[12]
(Latvia) L Dekmeijere (United States) J Ditty	1	0
2	(United States) S Williams (United States) V Williams	6	6

Semifinals
(Chinese Taipei) Y-j Chan (Romania) M Niculescu	3	6	[10]
4	(Romania) S Cîrstea (Russia) M Kirilenko	6	3	8
3	(United States) B Mattek-Sands (Russia) N Petrova	2	2
2	(United States) S Williams (United States) V Williams	6	6

Final
(Chinese Taipei) Y-j Chan (Romania) M Niculescu	4	1
2	(United States) S Williams (United States) V Williams	6	6
