= 2009 Bank of the West Classic =

- Date: July 27 – August 2
- Edition: 38th
- Category: WTA Premier tournaments
- Draw: 32S / 16D
- Prize money: $700,00
- Surface: Hard / outdoor
- Location: Stanford, California, US
- Venue: Taube Tennis Center

Champions

Singles
- (France) Marion Bartoli

Doubles
- (United States) Serena Williams / (United States) Venus Williams
- Stanford Classic

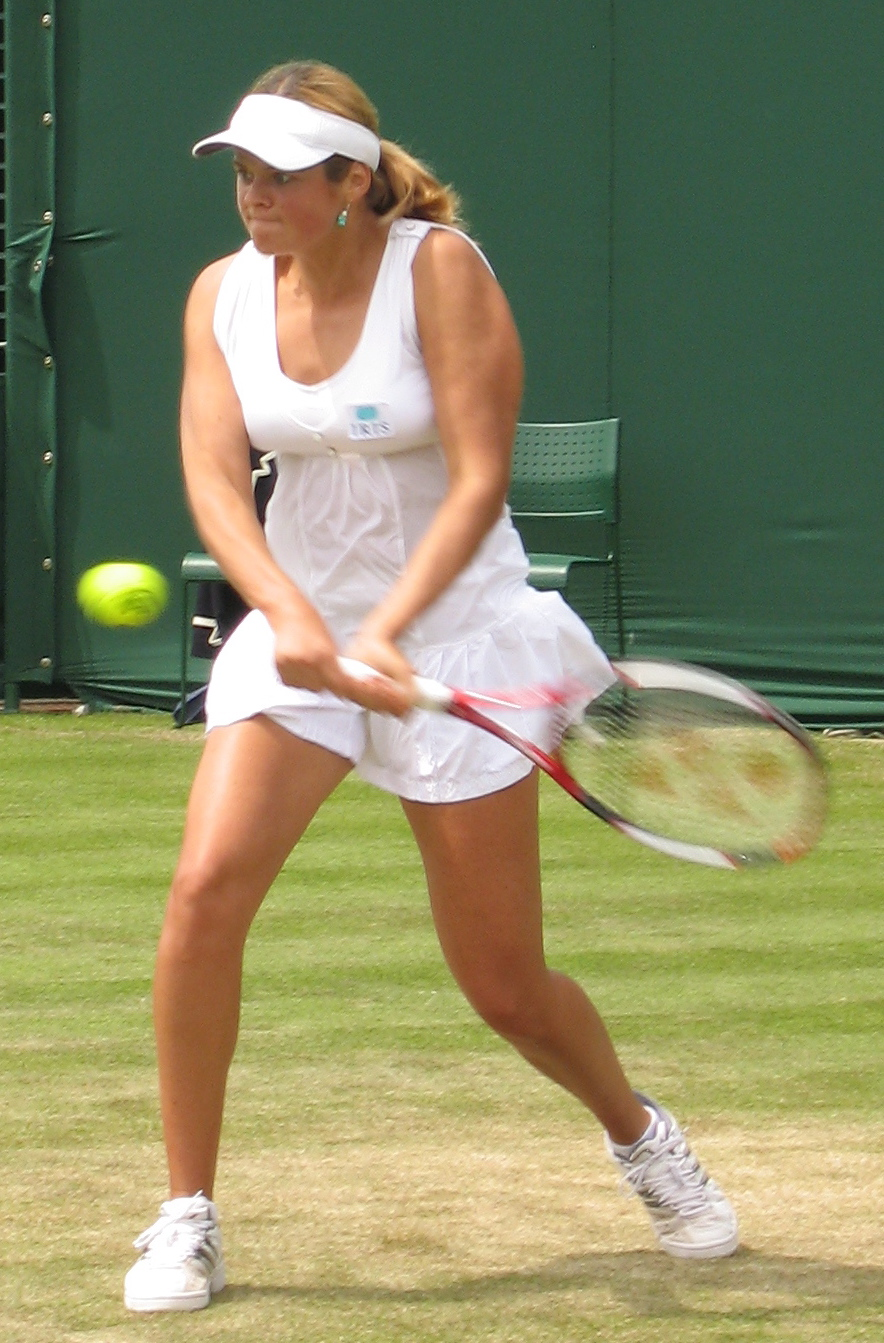
WTA Tour No. 22 Aleksandra Wozniak was the defending champion in Stanford

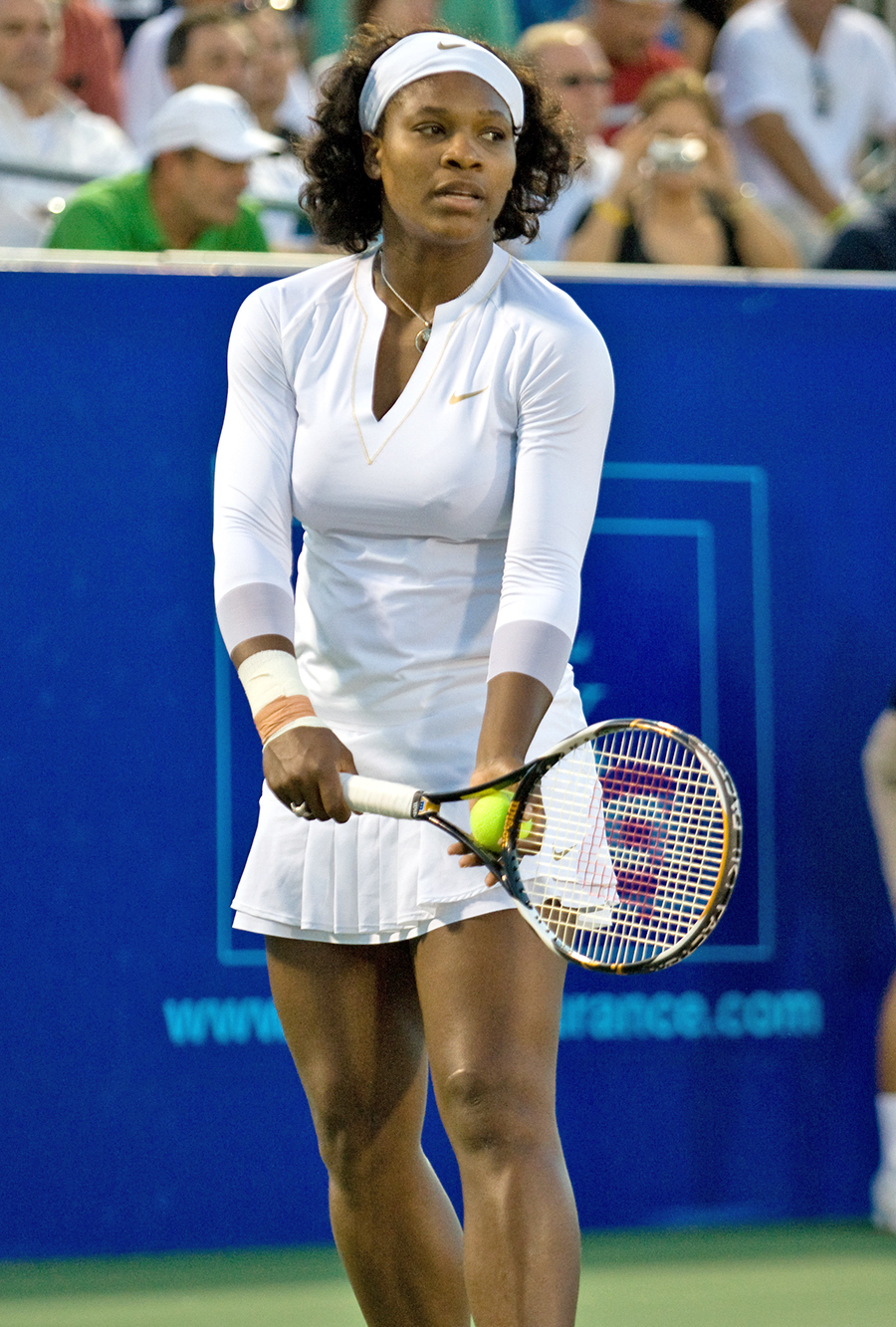
Wimbledon champion Serena Williams headlined the singles event in Stanford

The 2009 Bank of the West Classic was a tennis tournament played on outdoor hard courts. It was the 38th edition of the Bank of the West Classic, and was part of the WTA Premier tournaments of the 2009 WTA Tour. It took place at the Taube Tennis Center in Stanford, California, United States, from July 27 through August 2, 2009. It was the first women's event on the 2009 US Open Series.

== Finals ==
=== Singles ===
(France) Marion Bartoli defeated (United States) Venus Williams, 6–2, 5–7, 6–4

- It was Bartoli's 2nd title of the year, and 5th of her career.

=== Doubles ===
(United States) Serena Williams / (United States) Venus Williams defeated (Chinese Taipei) Yung-Jan Chan / (Romania) Monica Niculescu, 6–4, 6–1

== WTA entrants ==
Players committed to participating in the singles event for 2009.

Player	WTA Tour Rank^{*}	Seeds
(United States) Serena Williams	2	1
(United States) Venus Williams	3	2
(Russia) Elena Dementieva	4	3
(Serbia) Jelena Janković	6	4
(Russia) Nadia Petrova	10	5
(Slovakia) Dominika Cibulková	12	6
(Poland) Agnieszka Radwańska	14	7
(France) Marion Bartoli	15	8

- Seedings are based on the rankings of July 20, 2009.

=== Other entrants ===
The following players received wildcards into the singles main draw

- (United States) Hilary Barte
- (Canada) Stéphanie Dubois

The following players received entry from the qualifying draw:

- (United States) Melanie Oudin
- (Russia) Alla Kudryavtseva
- (United States) Angela Haynes
- (United States) Lilia Osterloh

Preceded by None	2009 US Open Series Women's Events	Succeeded by Los Angeles
