= 2009 Sony Ericsson Open =

Combined WTA/ATP tournament

Coordinates: 25°42′29″N 80°09′32″W

- Date: March 23 – April 5
- Edition: 25th
- Category: Masters 1000 (ATP); Premier Mandatory (WTA)
- Surface: Hard / outdoor
- Location: Key Biscayne, Miami, United States
- Venue: Tennis Center at Crandon Park

Champions

Men's singles
- (United Kingdom) Andy Murray

Women's singles
- (Belarus) Victoria Azarenka

Men's doubles
- (Belarus) Max Mirnyi / (Israel) Andy Ram

Women's doubles
- (Russia) Svetlana Kuznetsova / (France) Amélie Mauresmo
← 2008 ·	Miami Open	· 2010 →

The 2009 Sony Ericsson Open (also known as 2009 Miami Masters) was a men's and women's tennis tournament held from March 23 to April 5, 2009. It was the 25th edition of the Miami Masters event and was played on outdoor hard courts at the Tennis Center at Crandon Park in Key Biscayne, Florida, located near Miami. The tournament was part of 2009 ATP World Tour and 2009 WTA Tour, classified as ATP World Tour Masters 1000 and Premier Mandatory event respectively.

The men's singles event was won by British player Andy Murray, who defeated Novak Djokovic in the final. Victoria Azarenka of Belarus won the women's singles event by defeating defending champion Serena Williams. Both Murray and Azarenka were first-time winners at the tournament and also the first to win from their respective countries. In the doubles events, Max Mirnyi and Andy Ram won the men's title by defeating the team of Ashley Fisher and Stephen Huss. The women's doubles title was won by Svetlana Kuznetsova and Amélie Mauresmo who overcame Květa Peschke and Lisa Raymond in the final match.

== Tournament ==
The 2009 Sony Ericsson Open was the 25th edition of the Miami Masters tournament and was held at Tennis Center at Crandon Park, Key Biscayne near Miami, Florida. The tournament was a joint event between the Association of Tennis Professionals (ATP) and the Women's Tennis Association (WTA) and was part of the 2009 ATP World Tour and the 2009 WTA Tour calendars. The tournament consisted of both men's and women's singles and doubles events which were played on 12 Laykold Cushion Plus hard courts. The total prize money for the tournament was US$9,000,000 with $4,500,000 assigned equally to ATP and WTA events. Singles winners received $605,500 each and doubles winning teams received $225,000 each.

The tournament was conducted from March 23 to April 5, with qualifying draws played on March 23–24 and main draws from March 25 to April 5. Both the men's and women's singles draws consisted of 96 players and the doubles draws consisted of 32 teams. The qualifying draw consisted of 43 men and 42 women who competed for 12 positions each in the men's and women's final draw.

== Players ==
47 of the top 50 players in the ATP rankings entered the men's singles event at the tournament with Rafael Nadal seeded first, followed by Roger Federer, Novak Djokovic and Andy Murray. Defending champion Nikolay Davydenko withdrew ahead of the tournament due to a foot injury. Richard Gasquet, who was initially going to play, withdrew prior to his first match after suffering from right shoulder injury. Gasquet was replaced by lucky loser Björn Phau. 12 players progressed from the qualifying draws to the main draw and six players, including Lleyton Hewitt and Marcos Baghdatis, were given wildcard entries.

In the women's singles field, defending champion Serena Williams was top seeded, with number two Dinara Safina only 311 points behind her in the WTA rankings at the start of the tournament. Maria Sharapova was expected to return to singles tennis at this tournament after playing doubles matches in the previous tournament, the 2009 BNP Paribas Open. Sharapova, who had not played singles matches since August 2008, withdrew due to a continued lack of fitness. Jelena Dokić, Sania Mirza and Alexa Glatch were among the eight players who received wildcard entries. 12 players progressed from qualifying draws to main draw.

The doubles draws were led by defending champions Bob and Mike Bryan on the men's side and Cara Black and Liezel Huber on the women's side. Katarina Srebotnik, one of the women's doubles defending champions, had not recovered from an injury picked up in December 2008 and did not participate. Her partner from the previous year, Ai Sugiyama, partnered with Russian Daniela Hantuchová. Marina Erakovic – Sun Tiantian and Francesca Schiavone – Chan Yung-jan withdrew from the tournament due to respective injuries to Erakovic and Chan. The doubles draws included five wildcard entries in total.

== Events ==
=== Men's singles ===
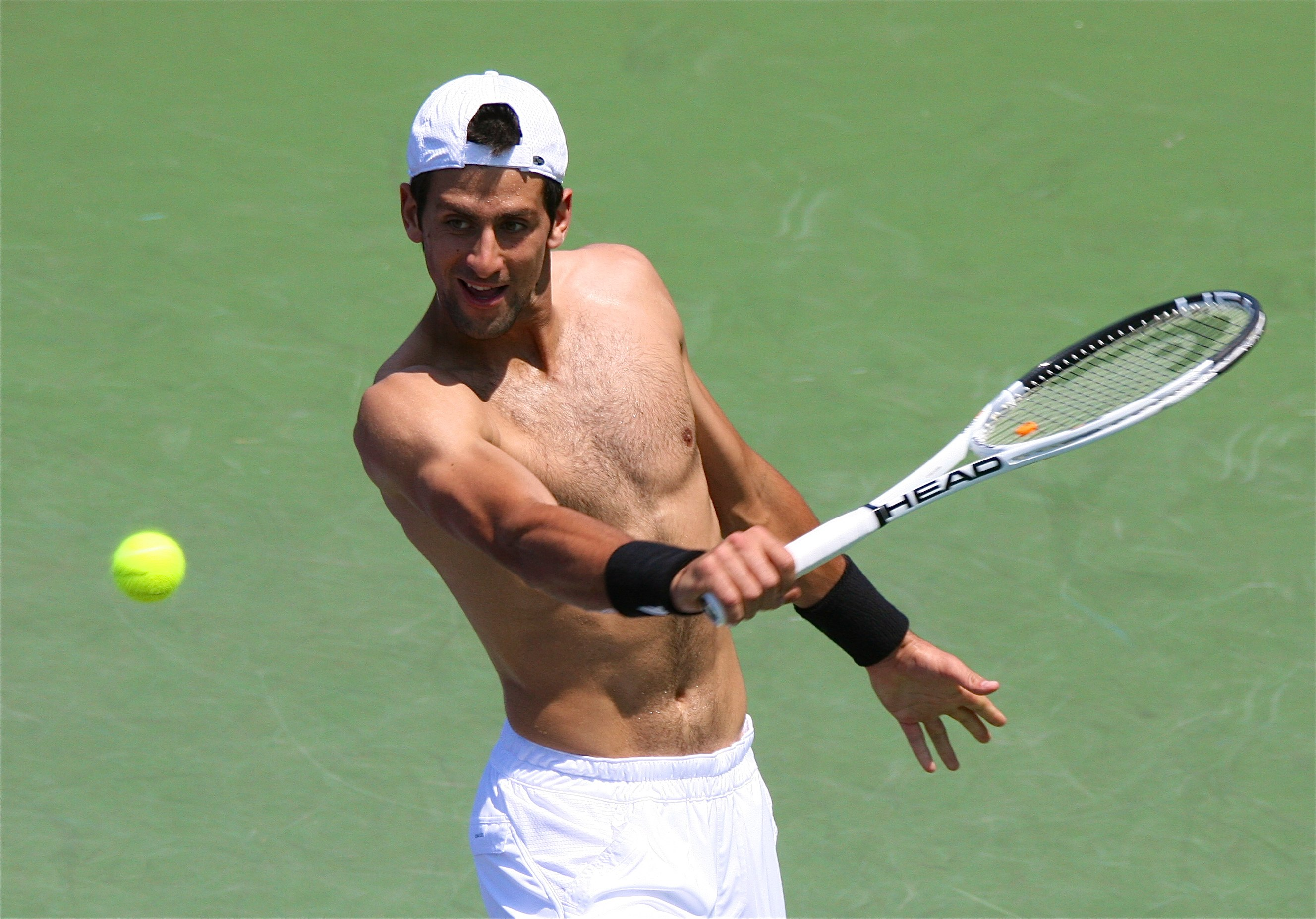
Novak Djokovic was the runner-up at the tournament.

All the seeded players received a bye into the second round. Wildcards Marcos Baghdatis and Lleyton Hewitt were among the players progressing into the second round, while Germans Philipp Kohlschreiber and former World no. 2 Tommy Haas were the major upsets. Most seeded players continued their progress into the third round with eighth seed Fernando Verdasco winning his 200th ATP tour match in his career. Ivo Karlović and David Nalbandian were among the seeded players defeated in second round. Lucky loser Björn Phau was promoted into the third round after his opponent Albert Montañés suffered a hamstring injury during the second set of the match and was forced to withdraw. Frenchman Gaël Monfils took a hard-fought win over 22nd seed and former world number 1 Marat Safin in a third round match played for nearly three hours. Qualifier Taylor Dent continued his successful run by defeating Tommy Robredo in the third round. Czechs Tomáš Berdych and Radek Štěpánek overcame higher seeded players James Blake and Fernando González en route to the fourth round.

Top seed Rafael Nadal faced an uphill battle against Stanislas Wawrinka in the fourth round match, facing a tiebreak in each set and eventually defeating him. Second seed Roger Federer defeated Dent in the fourth round to set up a quarterfinal match with longtime rival Andy Roddick, who overcame Gaël Monfils in a two-set match. Novak Djokovic, Andy Murray, Juan Martín del Potro, Verdasco and Jo-Wilfried Tsonga made it into the quarterfinals. Del Potro defeated Nadal in the three-set quarterfinal match to reach the first ATP Masters semifinal of his career. Del Potro took the final set on a tiebreak after losing the second set. Murray faced Verdasco in the second quarterfinal in a rematch of 2009 Australian Open fourth round. Verdasco suffered an injury in the second game of the match and had to be seen by his physio. He was not in good enough shape to compete with Murray and eventually lost. Federer defeated Roddick while Djokovic moved past Tsonga to advance to the semifinals. Djokovic rallied back to defeat Federer in the first semifinal after losing the first set. The third seed however kept his consistency in the next two sets and won them. Murray edged past del Potro in the second semifinal to enter his second straight Masters final. Murray faltered in the second set of the match conceding two service breaks. However he recovered in the final set, gaining an early break of serve, to win the match.

Djokovic and Murray appeared in their seventh and fourth Masters final and 19th and 17th career finals respectively. Djokovic led the head-to-head tally against Murray, but Murray had won the last two encounters between them. In the match, Murray moved into a 4–0 lead in the first set. Djokovic improved his serve from that point but lost the set. A role reversal in the second set saw Djokovic move into a 4–1 lead. Murray fought back, however, to level the score to 5–5 and won the set to secure the victory. This was Murray's third title win of the season and eleventh of his career. It was also his third Masters win of the career. Murray credited his improved fitness for his win. Djokovic, who had struggled with excessive heat in the past, struggled once again to assimilate with the temperature. He admitted that he was impatient early in the match, which resulted in him making too many unforced errors.

Final score

(United Kingdom) Andy Murray defeated (Serbia) Novak Djokovic, 6–2, 7–5.

=== Women's singles ===
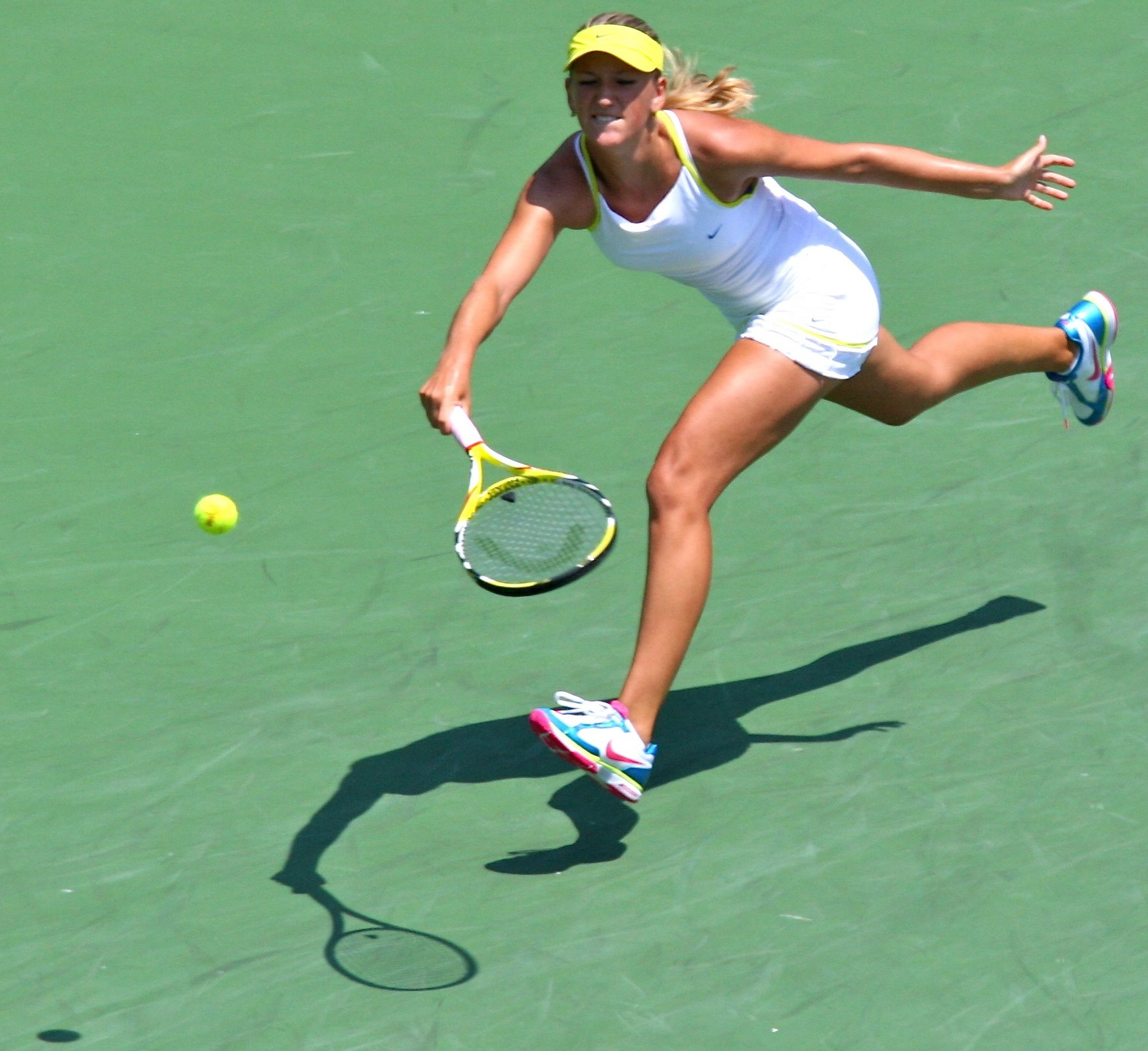
Victoria Azarenka won the third title of her career.

All the seeded players received a bye into the second round. Seven seeded players were ousted from the second round including third seed Jelena Janković, who was defeated by Gisela Dulko, and eighth seed Marion Bartoli, who lost to qualifier Anastasiya Yakimova. Second seed Dinara Safina, Vera Zvonareva and Ana Ivanovic were among the nine seeded players who were eliminated in the third round. Three times former champion and fifth seed Venus Williams faced stiff competition from Agnieszka Radwańska in fourth round. Williams lost the first set but prevailed in later sets to win the match. Li Na and Ekaterina Makarova also fought hard for a place in the quarterfinals, with Li coming out strong in the three set match, winning.

Svetlana Kuznetsova beat Caroline Wozniacki in the first of the quarterfinals. Kuznetsova looked good to win the match in straight sets after building a big lead, however Wozniacki fought back to win the second set on a tiebreak. Kuznetsova ultimately won. Victoria Azarenka defeated Samantha Stosur in the second quarterfinal. Williams sisters Serena and Venus set up the second semifinal after defeating Li Na and Iveta Benešová respectively. The Williams sisters had met 19 times before their semifinal meeting, Venus leading the head-to-head tally 10–9. Serena won this time in a closely fought match. Azarenka came on top in the second semifinal defeating Kuznetsova.

Serena and Azarenka met in their careers' 46th and seventh career finals respectively, with Serena appearing in her third consecutive final at the event, having won on the last two occasions. Azarenka dominated the final match, as Serena was playing while nursing a leg injury. Azarenka won the match, securing third title of her career. Azarenka stated that she was very nervous in the final game of the match and described her win as "the biggest moment in [her] career". Serena mentioned that it was difficult for her to move to the left, but she still played with maximum effort.

Final score

(Belarus) Victoria Azarenka defeated (United States) Serena Williams, 6–3, 6–1.

=== Men's doubles ===
Four seeded teams were eliminated in the first round of the event. Daniel Nestor and Nenad Zimonjić were the highest ranked team to lose, falling to Nicolás Almagro and David Ferrer, along with third seeds Mahesh Bhupathi and Mark Knowles, who lost to French duo Julien Benneteau and Jo-Wilfried Tsonga. Bennetau and Tsonga continued their progress into the third round defeating Rik de Voest and Bobby Reynolds. They were joined by Julian Knowle and Jürgen Melzer, who triumphed over Almagro and Ferrer. Only two seeded teams, those of Bob Bryan and Mike Bryan and of Bruno Soares and Kevin Ullyett, made it into the quarterfinals, and faced each other in that round. The Bryan brothers, who were the defending champions, overcame Soares and Ullyett in a two-set match. Ashley Fisher and Stephen Huss, Knowle and Melzer and Max Mirnyi and Andy Ram were the other teams who made it into the semifinals.

The Bryan brothers faced Fisher and Huss in the first semifinal and lost, ending their streak of winning 13 consecutive matches. Mirnyi and Ram encountered much harder competition against Knowle and Melzer and saved five match points before winning. In the final, there were no service breaks in the first set, with Fisher and Huss winning it in the tiebreak. Mirnyi and Ram came back strong to win the second set. The match-tiebreak decided the outcome of the final, with Mirnyi and Ram winning the tiebreak and the match. It was Mirnyi's 36th and Ram's 16th men's doubles title of the career and their second title as a team.

Final score

(Belarus) Max Mirnyi / (Israel) Andy Ram defeated (Australia) Ashley Fisher / (Australia) Stephen Huss, 6–7^{(4–7)}, 6–2, [10–7].

=== Women's doubles ===
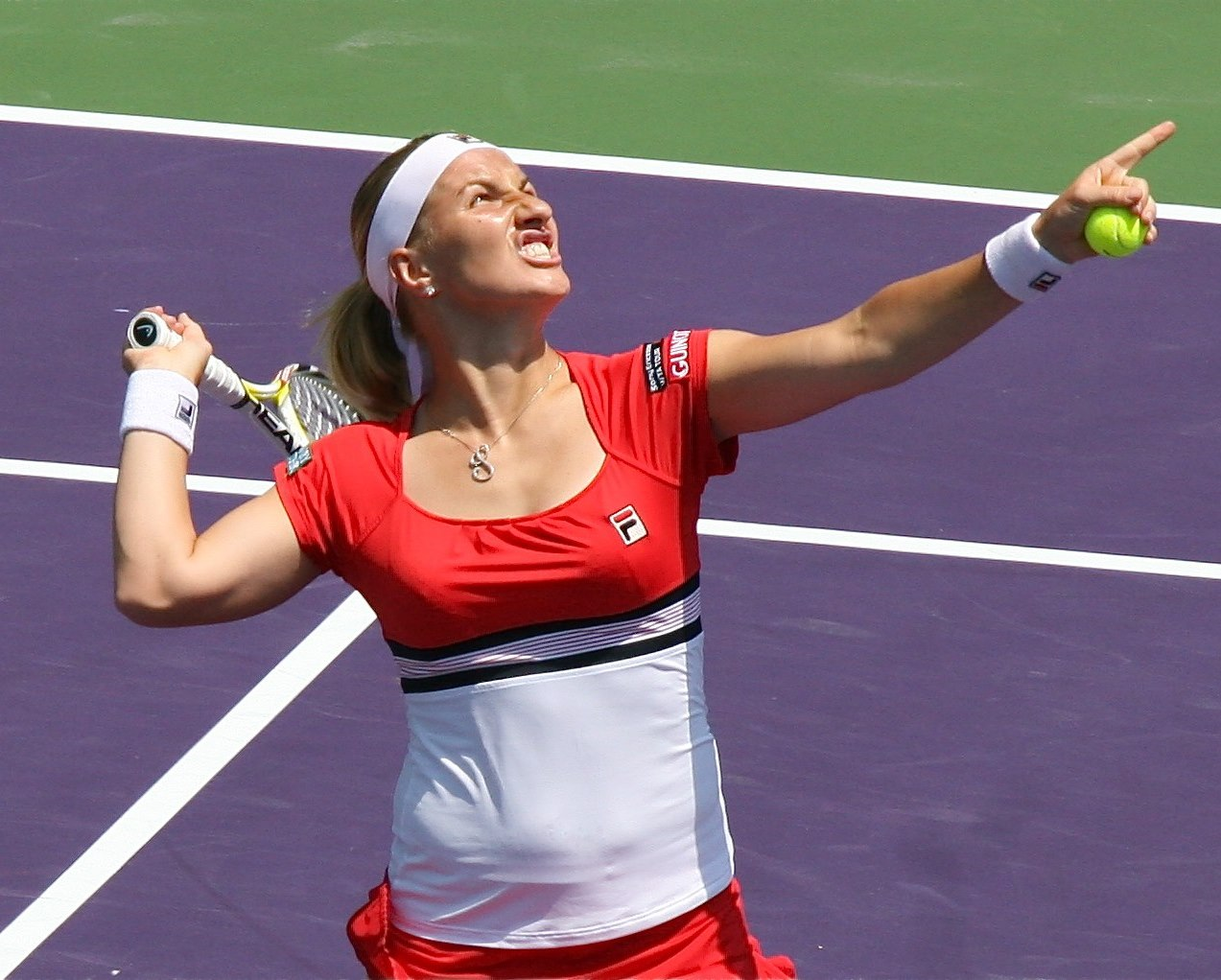
Svetlana Kuznetsova, along with Amélie Mauresmo, won the women's doubles event.

Daniela Hantuchová and Ai Sugiyama, who lost to wildcard entrants Petra Martić and CoCo Vandeweghe, were the only seeded pair to drop out in the first round. Another wildcard team of Svetlana Kuznetsova and Amélie Mauresmo defeated the top seeds Cara Black and Liezel Huber in the second round. Eighth seeds Maria Kirilenko and Flavia Pennetta were also eliminated in second round, losing to Chuang Chia-jung and Sania Mirza. Chuang and Mirza continued their march into the semifinal defeating second seeds Anabel Medina Garrigues and Virginia Ruano Pascual. They were joined by Kuznetsova and Mauresmo, Anna-Lena Grönefeld and Patty Schnyder, and Květa Peschke and Lisa Raymond, the only seeded team left in the draw.

Kuznetsova and Mauresmo defeated Grönefeld and Schnyder to enter their third final as a team. Peschke and Raymond overcame Chuang and Mirza to secure the second spot in the final. Kuznetsova and Mauresmo continued their winning streak in the final, defeating Peschke and Raymond. The title was Kuznetsova's 14th, Mauresmo's third and their second as a team.

Final score

(Russia) Svetlana Kuznetsova / (France) Amélie Mauresmo defeated (Czech Republic) Květa Peschke / (United States) Lisa Raymond, 4–6, 6–3, [10–3].

== Viewership ==
=== Broadcasting ===
The tournament was broadcast on television channels worldwide. The British television station Sky Sports held rights to broadcast the tournament from the first round through to the final. Both the men's and women's finals were shown on CBS in the United States. The tournament also had around 44 hours of live coverage in the United States. The tournament was broadcast for more than 2000 hours and seen by over 153 million people worldwide.

=== Attendance ===
According to the event organisers, 293,228 people attended the 22 sessions across the 12 days of the tournament. This was the second highest attendance in the tournament's history and four sessions were sellouts.
