= Maria Sharapova =

Russian tennis player (born 1987)

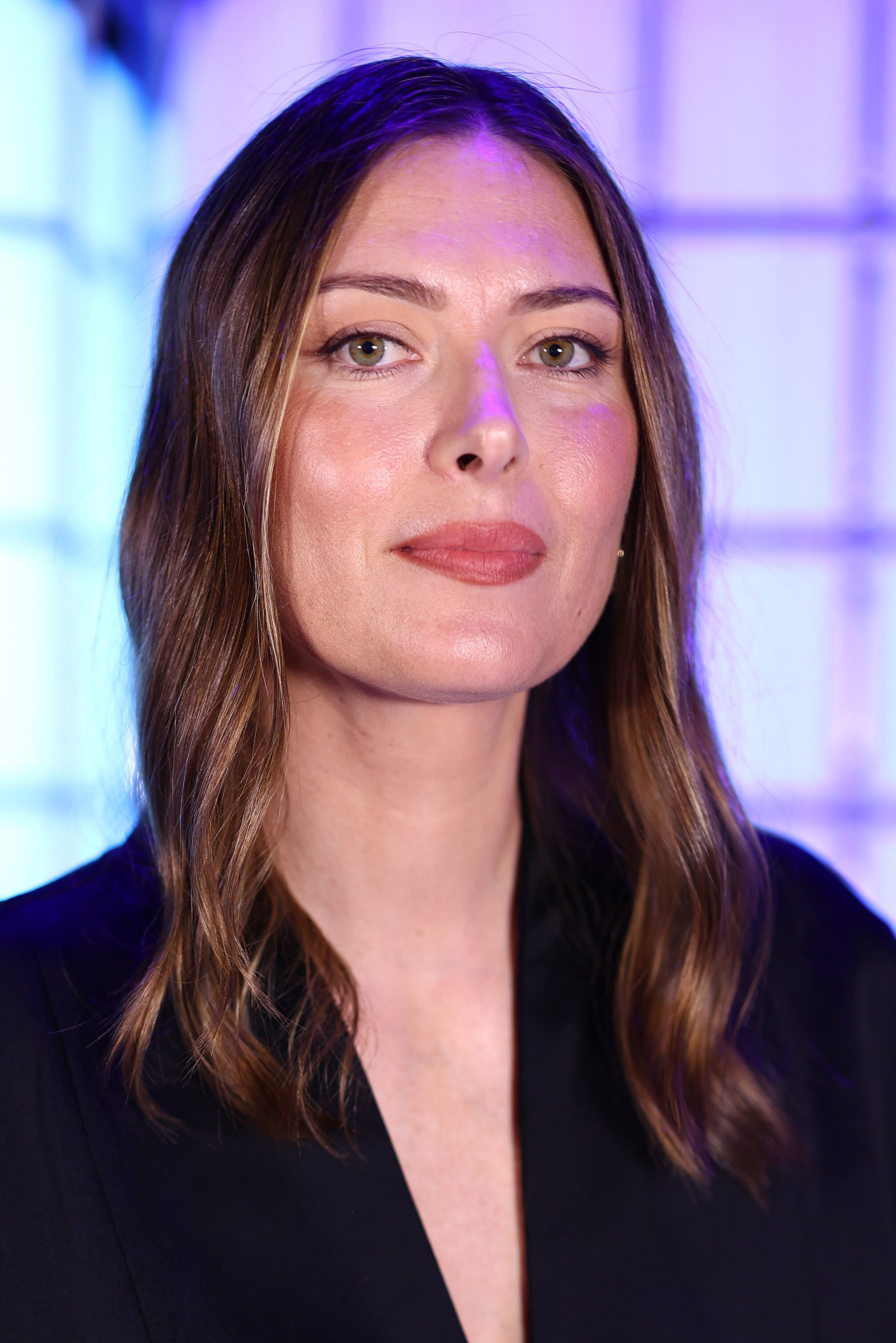
- Sharapova in 2024
- Full name: Mariya Yuryevna Sharapova
- Native name: Мария Шарапова
- Country (sports): Russia
- Residence: Bradenton, Florida, US
- Born: April 19, 1987 (age 39) Nyagan, Russian SFSR, Soviet Union
- Height: 188 cm (6 ft 2 in)
- Turned pro: April 19, 2001
- Retired: February 26, 2020
- Plays: Right-handed (two-handed backhand)
- Prize money: US$38,777,962: 7th all-time in earnings
- Int. Tennis HoF: 2025 (member page)

Singles
- Career record: 645–171 (79.0%)
- Career titles: 36
- Highest ranking: No. 1 (August 22, 2005)

Grand Slam singles results
- Australian Open: W (2008)
- French Open: W (2012, 2014)
- Wimbledon: W (2004)
- US Open: W (2006)

Other tournaments
- Tour Finals: W (2004)
- Olympic Games: F (2012)

Doubles
- Career record: 23–17 (57.5%)
- Career titles: 3
- Highest ranking: No. 41 (June 14, 2004)

Grand Slam doubles results
- Australian Open: 2R (2003, 2004)
- US Open: 2R (2003)

Mixed doubles
- Career record: 2–1 (66.7%)
- Career titles: 0

Grand Slam mixed doubles results
- US Open: QF (2004)

Team competitions
- Fed Cup: W (2008)

Signature
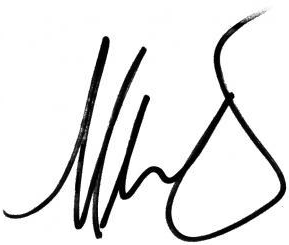
Medal record
Representing Russia
Olympic Games
Silver medal – second place	2012 London	Singles

Maria Yuryevna Sharapova (Russian: Мария Юрьевна Шарапова, romanized: Mariya Yuryevna Sharapova, pronounced [mɐˈrʲijə ʂɐˈrapəvə]; born April 19, 1987) is a Russian former professional tennis player. She was ranked as the world No. 1 in women's singles by the Women's Tennis Association (WTA) for 21 weeks. Sharapova won 36 WTA Tour-level singles titles, including five major titles, as well as the 2004 WTA Tour Championships. She is one of ten women to achieve the career Grand Slam in singles.

A teen sensation, Sharapova broke through to the top of the sport by winning the 2004 Wimbledon Championships as a 17-year-old, upsetting two-time defending champion Serena Williams. She then won the 2004 Tour Finals, and became the world No. 1 for the first time in August 2005 at the age of 18, the first Russian woman to top the singles rankings. Continued success over the following years, including titles at the 2006 US Open and 2008 Australian Open, was accompanied by recurring injuries, and Sharapova dipped in and out of the top 10 around the turn of the decade. After a career-long struggle with success on clay courts, Sharapova claimed the 2012 French Open to complete the career Grand Slam, returning to the No. 1 position, and shortly after won an Olympic silver medal in women's singles at the 2012 London Olympics. She won a second French Open title in 2014 for her fifth major championship.

Sharapova failed a drug test at the 2016 Australian Open, testing positive for meldonium, a substance that had been banned (effective January 1, 2016) by the World Anti-Doping Agency (WADA). On June 8, 2016, she was suspended from playing tennis for two years by the International Tennis Federation (ITF). On October 4, 2016, the suspension was reduced to 15 months, starting from the date of the failed test, as the Court of Arbitration for Sport found that she had committed "no significant fault" and that she had taken the substance "based on a doctor's recommendation... with good faith belief that it was appropriate and compliant with the relevant rules". She returned to the WTA Tour in April 2017 at the Stuttgart Open. Sharapova retired from the sport in 2020.

Sharapova has been featured in a number of modeling assignments, including a feature in the Sports Illustrated Swimsuit Issue. She has appeared in many advertisements, including those for Nike, Prince, and Canon, and has been the face of several fashion houses, most notably Cole Haan. Since February 2007, she has been a United Nations Development Programme Goodwill Ambassador, concerned specifically with the Chernobyl Recovery and Development Programme. In June 2011, she was named one of the "30 Legends of Women's Tennis: Past, Present and Future" by Time and in March 2012 was named one of the "100 Greatest of All Time" by Tennis Channel. According to Forbes, she was the highest-paid female athlete in the world for 11 consecutive years and earned US$285 million (including prize money) since she turned professional in 2001. In 2018, she launched a new program to mentor women entrepreneurs.

In 2025, she was inducted into the International Tennis Hall of Fame.

== Early life ==
Maria Yuryevna Sharapova was born on April 19, 1987, in Nyagan, Russian SFSR, Soviet Union. Her parents, Yuri Sharapov and Yelena, are from Gomel, Byelorussian SSR. Concerned about the regional effects of the 1986 Chernobyl nuclear accident, they left their hometown shortly before Maria was born.

=== Introduction to tennis ===
In 1990, when Sharapova was three, the family moved to Sochi, Russia. Her father, Yuri, befriended Aleksandr Kafelnikov, whose son Yevgeny would go on to win two Grand Slam singles titles and become Russia's first world No. 1 ranked tennis player. Aleksandr gave Sharapova her first tennis racquet in 1991 when she was four, whereupon she began practising regularly with her father at a local park. Maria took her first tennis lessons with veteran Russian coach Yuri Yutkin, who was instantly impressed when he saw her play, noting her "exceptional hand-eye coordination".

=== Start of professional training ===
In 1993, at the age of six, Sharapova attended a tennis clinic in Moscow run by Martina Navratilova, who recommended professional training with Nick Bollettieri at the IMG Academy in Bradenton, Florida. Bollettieri had previously trained players such as Andre Agassi, Monica Seles, and Anna Kournikova. With limited financial resources, Yuri Sharapov borrowed the sum that would enable him and his daughter, neither of whom could speak English, to travel to the United States, which they did in 1994. Visa restrictions prevented Sharapova's mother from joining them for two years. Arriving in Florida with savings of US$700, Sharapova's father took various low-paying jobs to fund her lessons until she was old enough to be admitted to the academy. Initially, she trained with Rick Macci. In 1995, however, she was signed by IMG, which agreed to pay the annual tuition fee of $35,000 for Sharapova to stay at the academy, allowing her to finally enroll at the age of 9.

== Tennis career ==
=== Junior and early career ===
Sharapova first hit tennis fame in November 2000, when she won the Eddie Herr International Junior Tennis Championships in the girls' 16 division at the age of just 13. She was then given a special distinction, the Rising Star Award, awarded to players of exceptional promise. Sharapova made her professional debut in 2001 on her 14th birthday on April 19, and played her first WTA tournament at the Pacific Life Open in 2002, winning a match before losing to Monica Seles. Due to restrictions on how many professional events she could play, Sharapova went to hone her game in junior tournaments, where she reached the finals of the girls' singles events at the Australian Open and Wimbledon in 2002. She was the youngest girl ever to reach the final of the Australian Open junior championship at 14 years and 9 months.

Sharapova reached No. 6 in the ITF junior world singles ranking on October 21, 2002. In all, she won three junior singles tournaments and was runner-up at five, including two junior Grand Slam events. Her win–loss record in junior competition was 47–9. Her best results in the Junior Grand Slam tournaments were the finals of the 2002 Australian Open, finals of the 2002 Wimbledon Championships, third round of the 2002 French Open, and second round of the 2001 US Open.

=== 2003: First tournament titles ===
From 2003, Sharapova played a full season and made a rapid climb into the top 50 by the end of the year. She made her debuts at both the Australian Open and the French Open, but failed to win a match in either. Then, as a wildcard at Wimbledon, she defeated 11th seed Jelena Dokić, her first win over a top-20 player, to reach the fourth round, where she lost in three sets to Svetlana Kuznetsova. By the end of September, Sharapova had already captured her first WTA title at a smaller event, the Japan Open Tennis Championships, before winning her second in her final tournament of the season, the Bell Challenge in Quebec City. To cap off her first full season as a professional, she was awarded the WTA Newcomer of the Year honor.

=== 2004: Wimbledon glory and rise to fame ===
Sharapova was defeated in the third round of the Australian Open by sixth seed Anastasia Myskina. She later reached the semifinals at the Cellular South Cup, where she lost to eventual champion Vera Zvonareva.

During the spring clay-court season, Sharapova entered the top 20 on the WTA world rankings as a result of reaching the third round of the Qatar Telecom German Open and the Internazionali BNL d'Italia, both of which were Tier I events. At the latter event, she defeated a player ranked in the top 10 for the first time with a straight-sets win over world No. 10 and 2004 French Open finalist Elena Dementieva. Later that clay-court season, she went on to make the quarterfinals of a Grand Slam for the first time at the French Open, losing there to Paola Suárez.

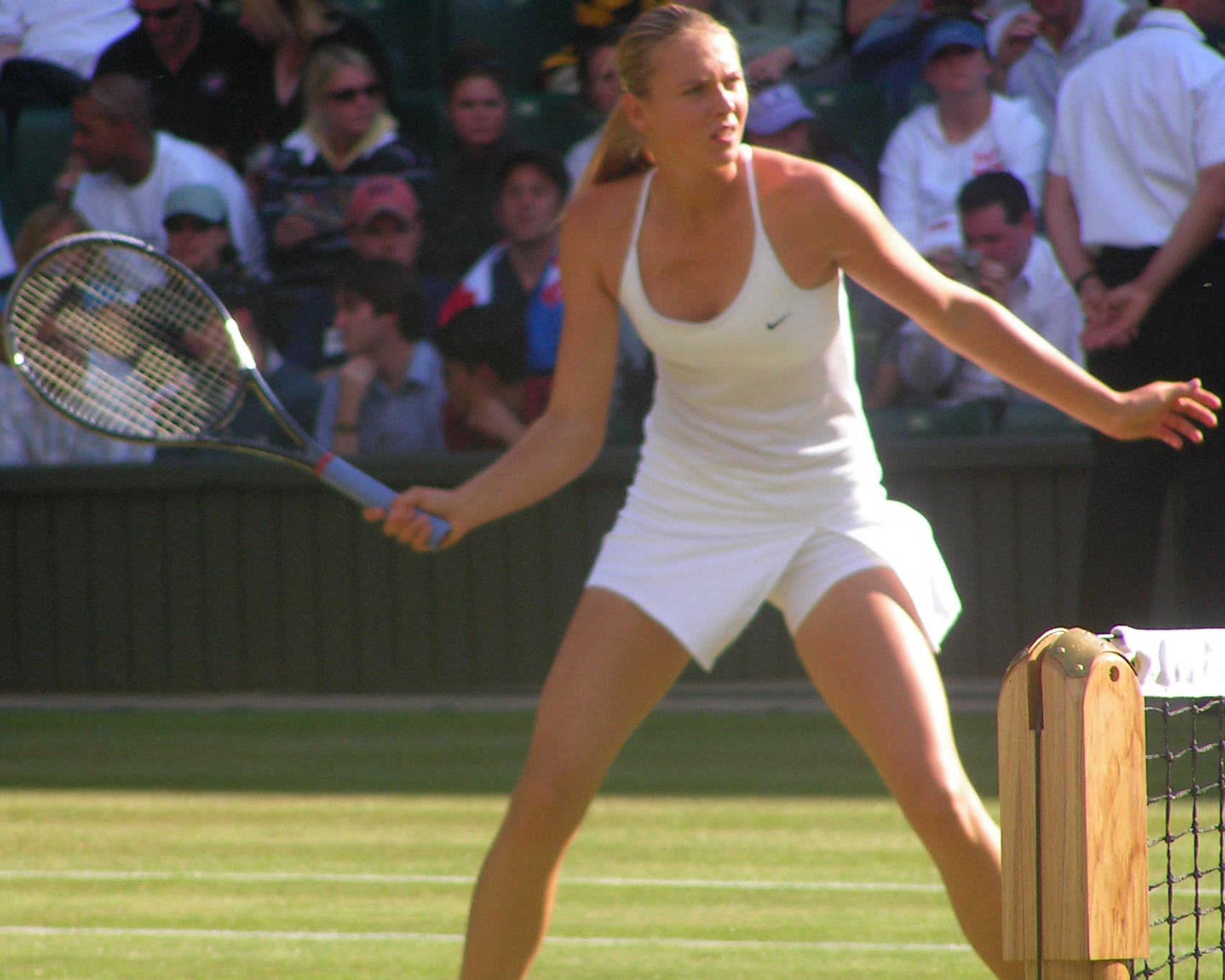
Sharapova at Wimbledon in 2004

Sharapova won the third title of her career at the Wimbledon warm-up DFS Classic, defeating Tatiana Golovin in the final. Seeded 13th and aged 17 at Wimbledon, she reached her first Grand Slam semifinal by defeating Ai Sugiyama. There, she defeated fifth seed and former champion Lindsay Davenport. In the final, Sharapova upset top seed and defending champion Serena Williams to win her first Grand Slam singles title, and become the third-youngest woman to win the Wimbledon title, behind only Lottie Dod and Martina Hingis. Sharapova also became the second Russian woman (after Anastasia Myskina had won the year's previous major at Roland Garros) to win a Grand Slam singles title. The victory was hailed by the media as "the most stunning upset in memory", with other writers commenting on her arrival as a serious challenger to the Williams' dominance at Wimbledon. She entered the top 10 in the rankings for the first time as a result of the win.

Following her Wimbledon win, attention and interest in Sharapova in the media greatly increased, a rise in popularity dubbed "Maria Mania." She won three of six matches in her preparations for the US Open. At the US Open itself, she reached the third round, before being eliminated by Mary Pierce. In order to regain confidence, Sharapova played and won consecutive titles in Asia in the fall, the Hansol Korea Open Tennis Championships and the Japan Open Tennis Championships.

In October, Sharapova defeated Venus Williams en route to making the final of a Tier I event for the first time at the Zurich Open, losing in the final to Alicia Molik. She then made her debut at the year-ending WTA Tour Championships. There, she won two of her three round-robin matches (including a win over US Open champion Svetlana Kuznetsova) in order to advance to the semifinals, where she defeated Myskina. In the final, she defeated an injured Serena Williams, after trailing 4–0 in the final set.

=== 2005: World No. 1 ===
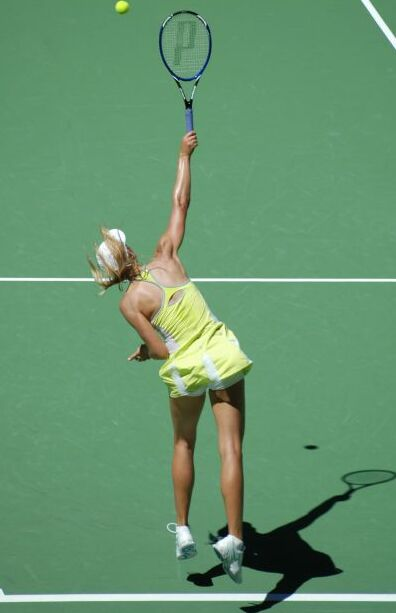
Sharapova at the 2005 Australian Open

Sharapova started the year at the Australian Open, where she defeated fifth seed Svetlana Kuznetsova to reach the second Grand Slam semifinal of her career. Sharapova held three match points in the third set of her semifinal match, before losing to eventual champion Serena Williams. In February, Sharapova won back-to-back tournaments, the Toray Pan Pacific Open and the Qatar Total Open, allowing her to reach number 3 in the world rankings for the first time.

In the semifinals of the Tier I Pacific Life Open, Sharapova was defeated by Lindsay Davenport, the first time she had failed to win a game in a match. She defeated former world No. 1 players Justine Henin and Venus Williams to reach the final at the Tier I NASDAQ-100 Open, where she lost to Kim Clijsters.

Sharapova made the semifinals of a clay-court tournament for the first time at the Italian Open, where she lost to Patty Schnyder. Sharapova would have become world No. 1 for the first time had she won the tournament. Sharapova then reached the quarterfinals of the French Open for the second consecutive year, before losing to eventual champion Henin. On grass, Sharapova won her third title of the year when she successfully defended her title at the DFS Classic, defeating Jelena Janković in the final. As the defending champion at Wimbledon, Sharapova reached the semifinals without dropping a set and losing a service game just once, extending her winning streak on grass to 24 matches. However, she was then beaten by eventual champion Venus Williams.

Sharapova had far fewer points to defend, and so she became the first Asian and Russian woman to hold the world No. 1 ranking on August 22, 2005. Her reign lasted only one week, however, as Davenport reclaimed the top ranking after winning the Pilot Pen Tennis tournament.

As the top seed at the US Open, Sharapova lost in the semifinals to Kim Clijsters, meaning she had lost to the eventual champion in every Grand Slam of the season. However, she once again leapfrogged Davenport to take the world No. 1 ranking on September 12, 2005. She retained it for six weeks, but after playing few tournaments while injured, she again relinquished the ranking to Davenport.

=== 2006: US Open champion ===
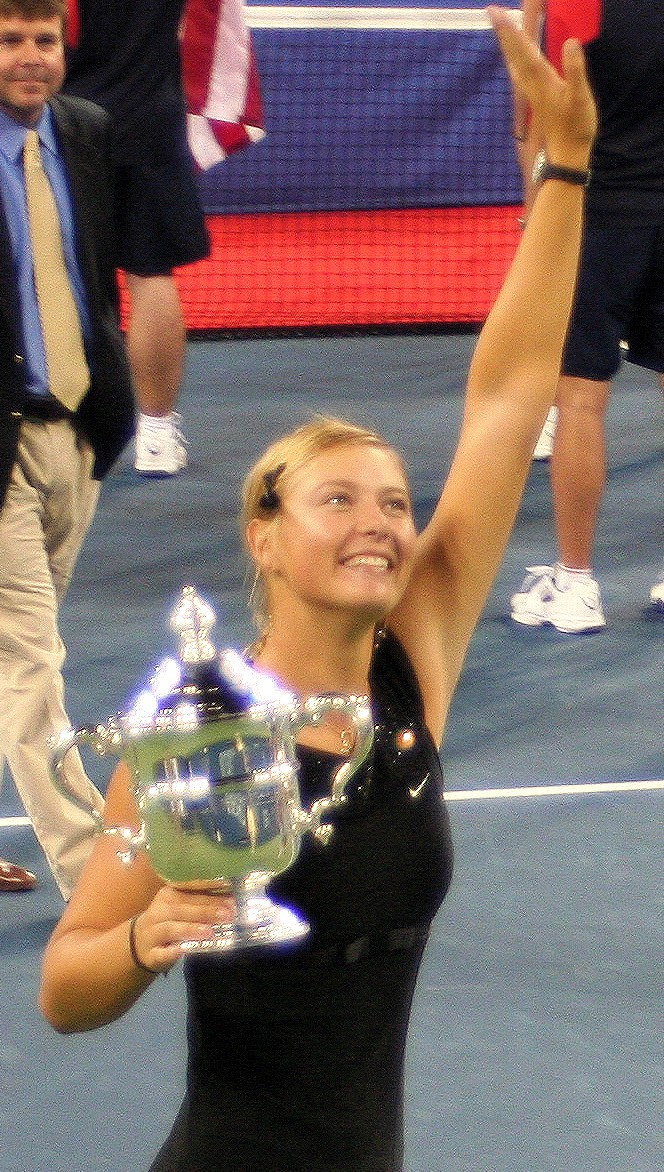
Sharapova celebrating after winning the 2006 US Open

Sharapova started 2006 by losing in the semifinals of the Australian Open in three sets to Henin, also losing a rematch several weeks later at the Dubai Tennis Championships, having defeated former world No. 1 Martina Hingis and world No. 3 Lindsay Davenport in earlier rounds of the tournament. Sharapova claimed her first title in nine months at the Tier I tournament in Indian Wells, defeating Hingis in the semifinals and Elena Dementieva in the final. She reached the final in Miami before losing to Kuznetsova.

Sharapova returned for the French Open. There, after saving match points in defeating Mashona Washington in the first round, she was eliminated by Dinara Safina in the fourth round. On grass, Sharapova was unsuccessful in her attempt to win in Birmingham for the third consecutive year, losing in the semifinals to Jamea Jackson. Despite that, she was among the title favorites at Wimbledon, where the eventual champion Mauresmo ended up beating her in the semifinals.

Sharapova claimed her second title of the year at the Tier I Acura Classic, defeating Clijsters for the first time in the final. As the third seed at the US Open, Sharapova defeated top seed Mauresmo for the first time in the semifinals, and then followed up by beating second seed Justine Henin to win her second Grand Slam singles title.

That autumn, Sharapova won titles in back-to-back weeks at the Zurich Open and the Generali Ladies Linz. By winning all three of her round-robin matches at the WTA Tour Championships, she extended her win streak to 19 matches, before it was snapped in the semifinals by eventual champion Henin. Sharapova would have finished the season as world No. 1 had she won the event. As it was, she finished ranked world No. 2, her best year-end finish yet.

=== 2007: Return to No. 1, shoulder injury and fall from the Top 5 ===
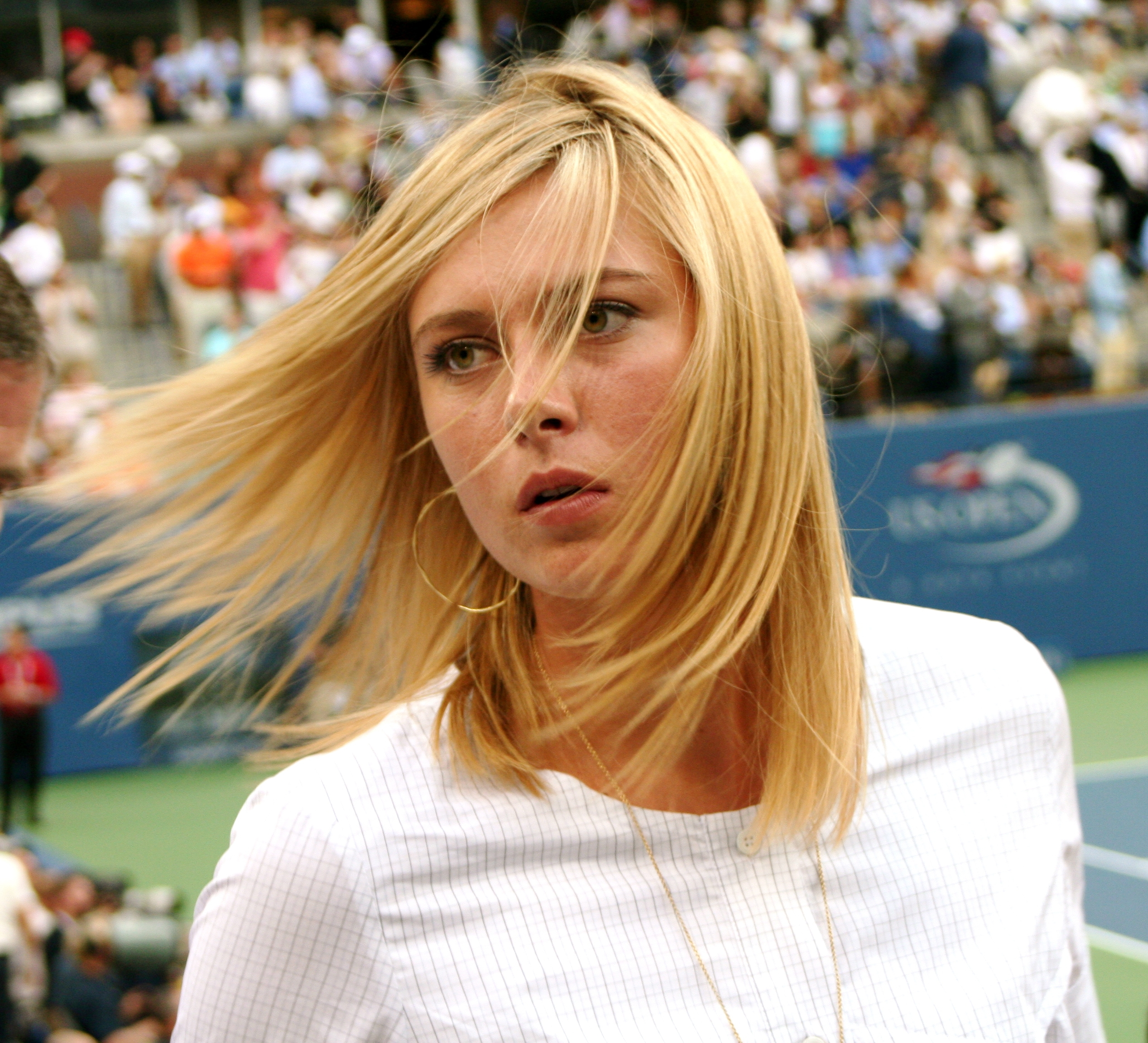
Sharapova at the 2007 US Open

Sharapova was the top seed at the Australian Open due to top-ranked Justine Henin's withdrawal. After being two points away from defeat in the first round against Camille Pin, she went on to reach the final of the tournament for the first time, but was routed there by Serena Williams who was ranked world No. 81 at the time. After reaching the final, Sharapova recaptured the world No. 1 ranking. She held it for seven weeks, surrendering it back to Henin after failing to defend her title at the Pacific Life Open, instead losing in the fourth round to Vera Zvonareva after struggling with a hamstring injury. The following fortnight, she defeated Venus Williams in the third round of the Sony Ericsson Open, before being beaten again by Serena Williams.

A shoulder injury forced Sharapova to miss most of the clay-court season for the second consecutive year, resulting in her only tune-up for the French Open being the İstanbul Cup, where she lost in the semifinals to Aravane Rezaï. She reached the semifinals of the French Open for the first time in her career, before losing to Ana Ivanovic. On grass, Sharapova was runner-up to Jelena Janković at the DFS Classic. Following that, she experienced her earliest Wimbledon loss since 2003 by losing in the fourth round to eventual champion Venus Williams.

Sharapova clinched the US Open Series by defending her title at the Acura Classic, her only championship of the year, and reaching the semifinals in Los Angeles. In her US Open title defense, Sharapova was upset in her third-round match by 30th seed Agnieszka Radwańska, making it her earliest exit at a Grand Slam singles tournament since the 2004 US Open, where she lost in the same round.

Following the US Open loss, Sharapova did not play again until the Kremlin Cup in October, where she lost her opening match to Victoria Azarenka. Shortly after this, she fell out of the top 5 in the world rankings for the first time since 2004. She qualified for the eight-woman year-end Sony Ericsson Championships because of a withdrawal by Venus Williams before the start of the tournament. Despite having not previously won a match in two months, Sharapova topped her round-robin group at the tournament, after winning all three of her matches, defeating Svetlana Kuznetsova, Ana Ivanovic, and Daniela Hantuchová. She then defeated Anna Chakvetadze in the semifinals. In the final, she lost to world No. 1 Henin in a match that lasted 3 hours and 24 minutes. Sharapova reached the top 5 again to end the year.

=== 2008: Australian Open champion, No. 1 and second shoulder injury ===
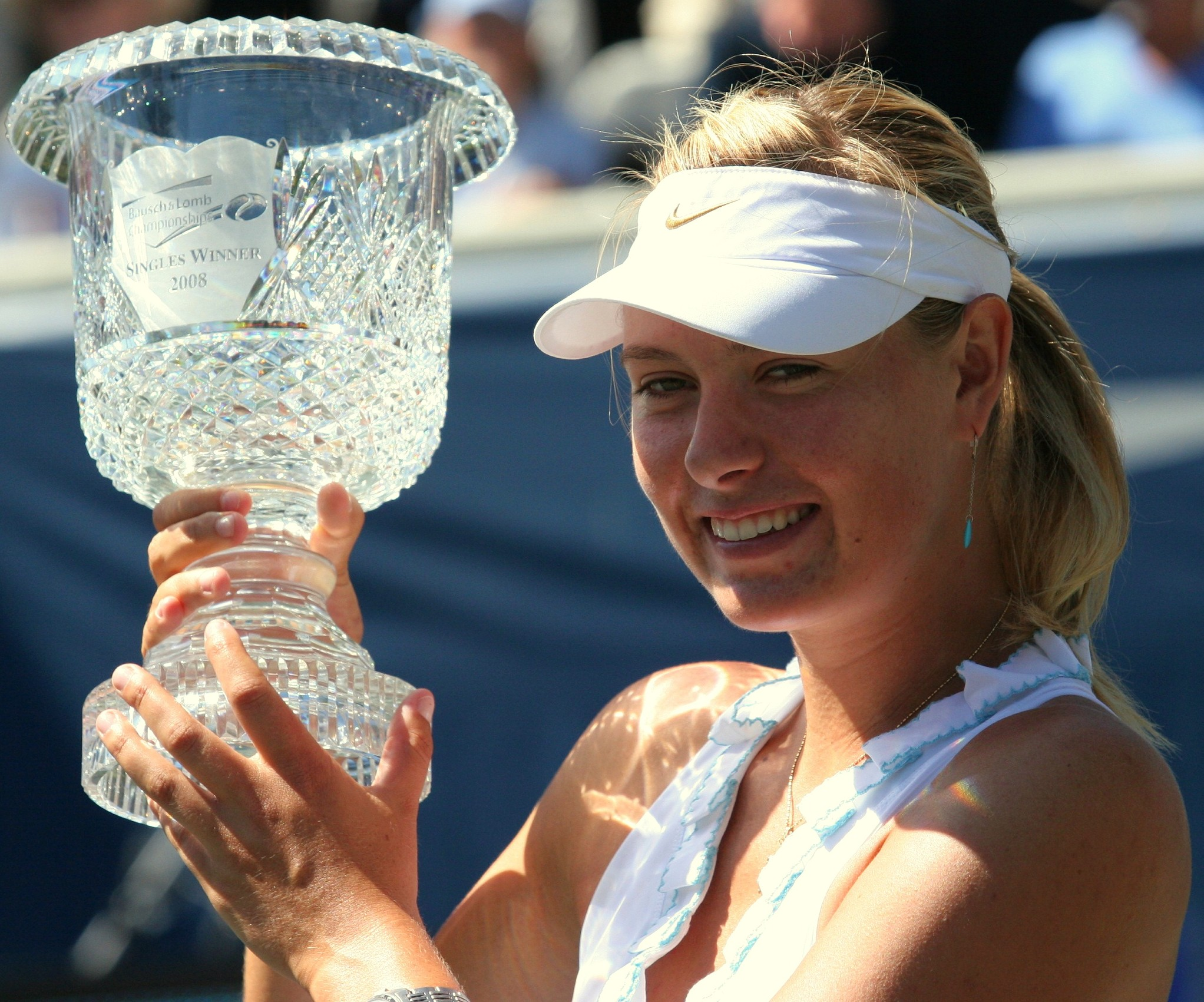
Sharapova with her Bausch & Lomb Championship trophy in April 2008

Sharapova was seeded fifth at the Australian Open, but was not considered a favorite. Nevertheless, she defeated former world No. 1 Lindsay Davenport in the second round, and then world No. 1 Henin in the quarterfinals, ending the latter's 32-match winning streak. She proceeded to the finals by defeating Jelena Janković in the semifinals, and defeated Ana Ivanovic in the final to win her third Grand Slam title, having not dropped a set all tournament.

After the Australian Open, Sharapova extended her winning streak to 18 matches. This run encompassed two wins including at the Tier I Qatar Open. Her winning streak was ended in the semifinals of the Pacific Life Open by Kuznetsova. In April, Sharapova won the Bausch & Lomb Championships, having survived her longest-ever match, at 3 hours and 26 minutes long, in the third round against Anabel Medina Garrigues. The following week, at the Family Circle Cup, she lost in the quarterfinals to Serena Williams, her fourth consecutive loss to the American.

In May, Sharapova regained the world No. 1 ranking because of Henin's sudden retirement from professional tennis and request to the WTA that her own ranking be removed immediately. As the top-seeded player at the French Open, Sharapova was within two points of being knocked out by Evgeniya Rodina in the first round, before eventually winning. As a result of losing to eventual finalist Dinara Safina in the fourth round (after serving for the match), she relinquished her No. 1 ranking. Her dip in form continued at Wimbledon, where she lost in the second round to world No. 154 Alla Kudryavtseva. This was her earliest loss at Wimbledon, and at any Grand Slam in almost five years.

Sharapova withdrew from the Rogers Cup tournament in August following a shoulder injury. An MRI scan revealed that she had been suffering from a rotator cuff tear since April, forcing her out of all tournaments for the rest of the season, including the Beijing Olympics, the US Open, and the WTA Tour Championships. In spite of that, she still finished the year ranked world No. 9. In October, after a failed attempt to rehabilitate the shoulder, Sharapova had surgery to repair the tear.

=== 2009–2010: Shoulder surgery, rehabilitation, comeback and struggles with form ===
Sharapova did not attempt to defend her Australian Open title, as she continued to recover from surgery. She returned to the sport in March, in the doubles tournament at the Indian Wells Open, but she and partner Elena Vesnina lost in the first round. After this, Sharapova withdrew from further singles tournaments, resulting in her standing in the world rankings being severely affected. She dropped out of the top 100 for the first time in six years in May, the nadir being world No. 126.

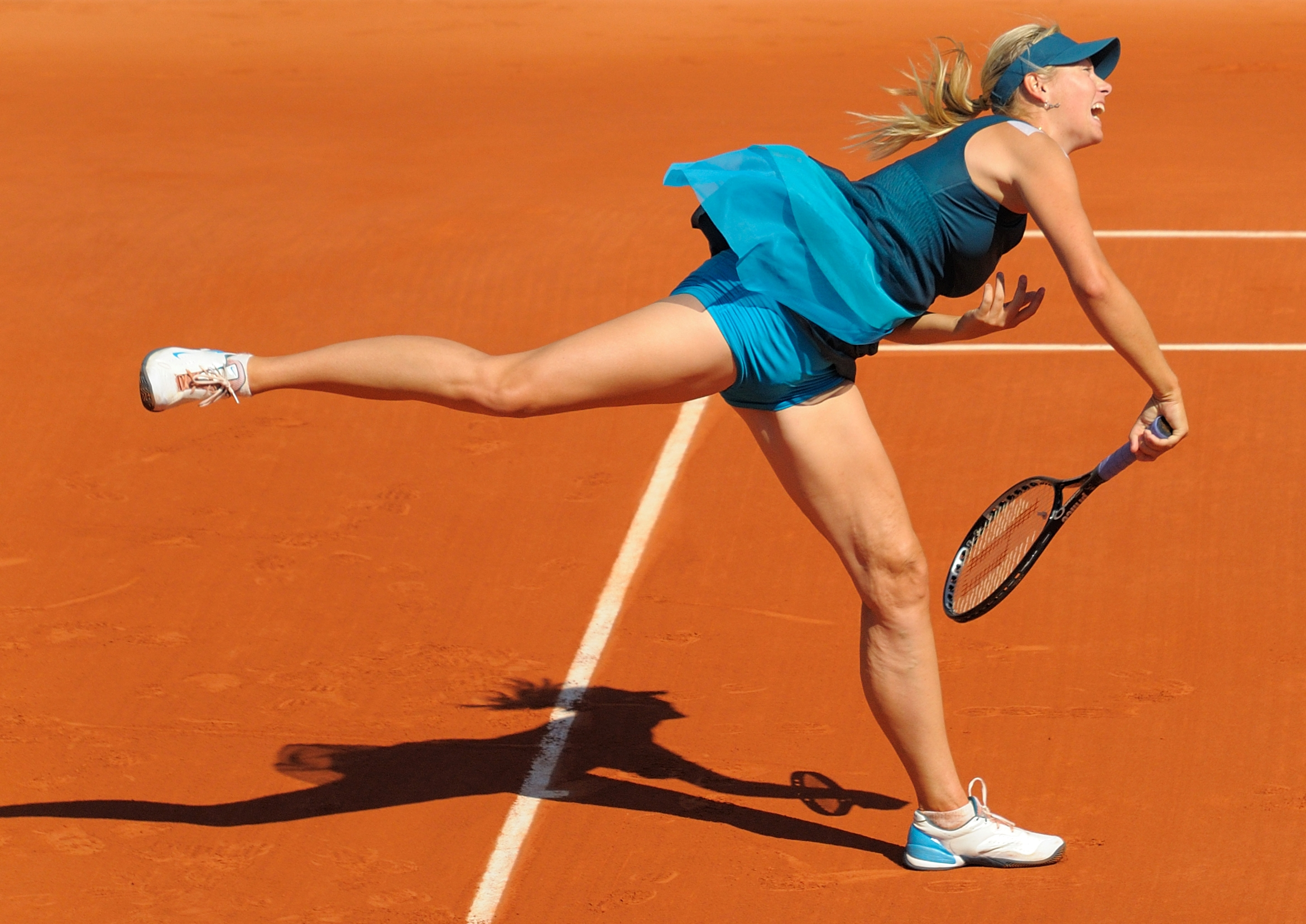
Sharapova made the quarterfinals of the French Open, her best Grand Slam performance of 2009.

Playing her first singles tournament in nearly ten months, Sharapova made the quarterfinals of the clay-court Warsaw Open in May, losing to finalist Alona Bondarenko. The following week, in her first Grand Slam appearance since her surgery, she reached the quarterfinals of the French Open, before her run was ended by Dominika Cibulková.

During the summer grass-court season, Sharapova played in Birmingham, losing in the semifinals to Li Na. Sharapova then played at Wimbledon as the 24th seed. She was upset in the second round by Gisela Dulko in three sets.

Sharapova enjoyed considerable success in the summer months, reaching the quarterfinals at the Bank of the West Classic, the semifinals at the LA Women's Championships, and finishing runner-up at the Rogers Cup to Elena Dementieva. At the US Open, Sharapova was seeded 29th. She found her way into the third round, defeating Tsvetana Pironkova and Christina McHale, all in straight sets. She was stunned in the third round by American teenager Melanie Oudin. It was the second time in Sharapova's career that she lost to a teenager at a Grand Slam tournament, having lost to Agnieszka Radwańska during the same event in 2007. The loss made Sharapova's ranking go down to No. 32.

The final stretch of the season brought Sharapova her first title of the year in Tokyo, after opponent Jelena Janković retired after being down 2–5 to Sharapova in the final. By virtue of that result, she was the recipient of a bye at the China Open, but failed to capitalize on it, losing to Peng Shuai in the third round. She ultimately finished the season at world No. 14, having improved from No. 126 when she started her comeback from injury.

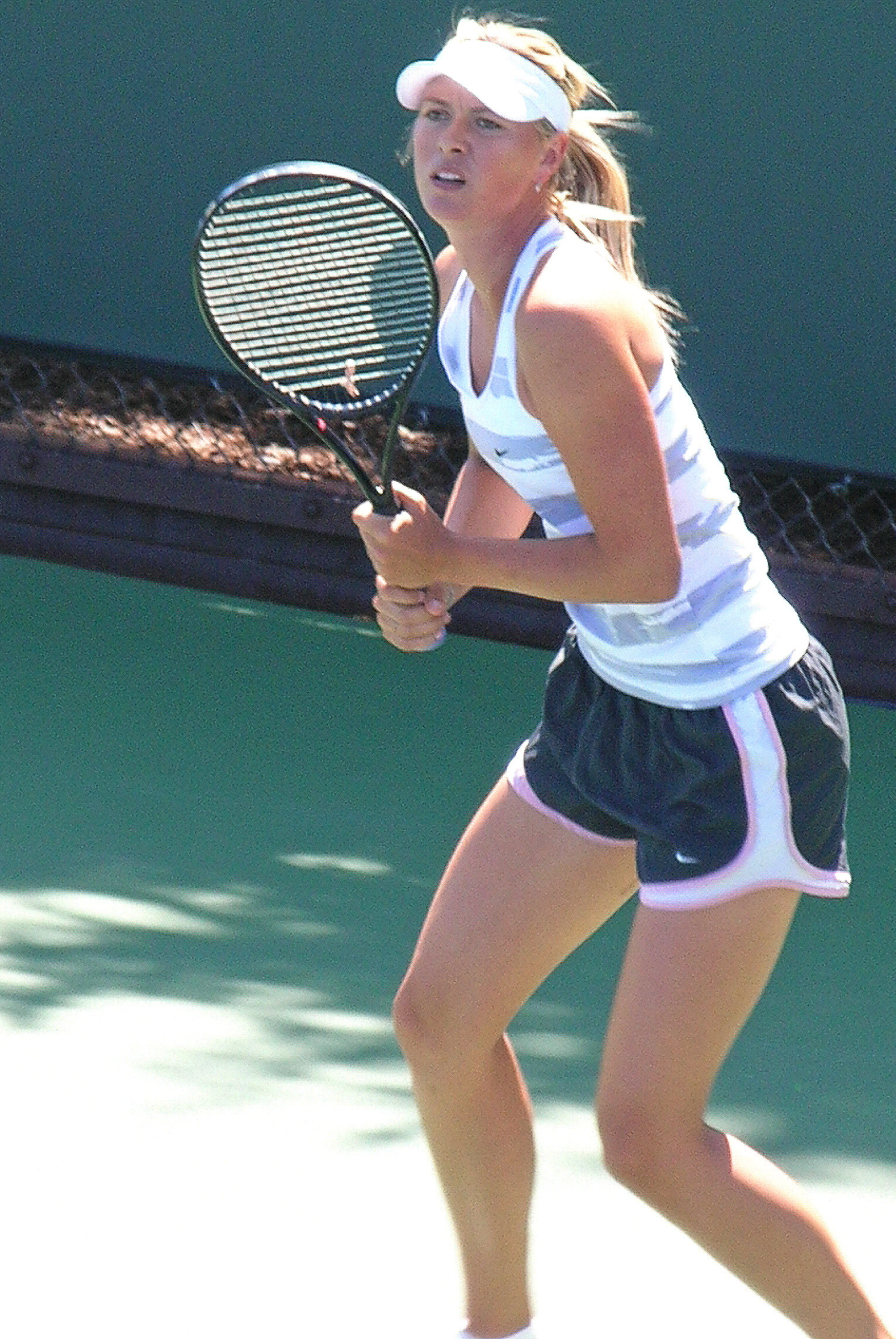
Sharapova during a pre-match practice at the 2010 Bank of the West Classic

After playing two exhibition tournaments in Asia, Sharapova officially began her season at the Australian Open, where she was upset in her first-round match against Maria Kirilenko. The loss meant that for the first time since 2003, Sharapova had lost her opening match at a Grand Slam event. She then rebounded by winning a smaller American event, the Cellular South Cup, her 21st career WTA title and first of the year.

At the Indian Wells Open, Sharapova lost in the third round to Zheng Jie, aggravating a bruised bone on her right elbow in the process, which resulted in her eventual withdrawal from the Sony Ericsson Open and the Family Circle Cup.

Returning at the Madrid Open, Sharapova lost in the first round to Lucie Šafářová. She continued her French Open preparation at the Internationaux de Strasbourg as a wildcard, advancing to the final, where she beat Kristina Barrois. This was her first title on red clay and 22nd overall title. At the French Open, Sharapova's brief clay season culminated with a third-round loss to four-time champion Justine Henin.

Sharapova began her preparations for Wimbledon at the Aegon Classic. She advanced to the final for the fourth time, where she lost to Li Na. As the 16th seed at Wimbledon, Sharapova lost in the fourth round to world No. 1 and eventual champion Serena Williams, despite having three set points in the opening set. The match was seen as another encouraging performance for Sharapova, with some stating their belief that she was approaching the form that would see her contending for Grand Slams once more, and Sharapova herself stating that she felt that she was "in a much better spot than I was last year."

During the US Open Series, Sharapova made two straight finals, losing to Victoria Azarenka at the Bank of the West Classic, and to Kim Clijsters at the Western & Southern Open. In the latter match, Sharapova held three match points while leading 5–3 on Clijsters's serve late in the second set, but could not convert them. At the US Open, Sharapova was the 14th seed. She made it to the fourth round, where she played top seed and 2009 finalist Caroline Wozniacki and lost.

Sharapova's last two tournaments of the season ended in disappointment. She played in the Pan Pacific Open in Tokyo, where she was upset in the first round by 39-year-old Kimiko Date-Krumm. Her last tournament of the year was the China Open, where she lost in the second round to fellow Russian Elena Vesnina. She ended the year at number 18 in the world.

=== 2011: Return to the top 10 ===
It was announced that Sharapova would bring in Thomas Högstedt as a coach for the 2011 season, joining Michael Joyce. On December 5, Sharapova won an exhibition match against world No. 2 Vera Zvonareva in Monterrey, Mexico. In Sharapova's first official Australian Open warm-up tournament at the Auckland Open, she was top-seeded. She lost to the Hungarian veteran and eventual champion, Gréta Arn, in the quarterfinals. After that, Sharapova decided to split up with Joyce, ending a successful cooperation that brought her two Grand Slam victories and the world No. 1 ranking.

Sharapova participated in the first Grand Slam of the season at the Australian Open, where she was the 14th seed, but lost to Andrea Petkovic in the fourth round. She also had to pull out of the Dubai Championships and the Qatar Open because of an ear infection. Sharapova returned to the tour in March by taking part in the 2011 BNP Paribas Open, where she was seeded 16th. She defeated former world No. 1, Dinara Safina, in the fourth round en route to the semifinal, where she lost to world No. 1, Caroline Wozniacki. At Key Biscayne, Sharapova defeated 26th seed Alexandra Dulgheru in the quarterfinals, in a match lasting 3 hours and 28 minutes. In the semifinals, Sharapova took her Australian Open reprisal on Andrea Petkovic by defeating her. In the final, she was defeated by Victoria Azarenka, despite a late comeback in the second set. With this result, Sharapova returned to the top 10 for the first time since February 2009.

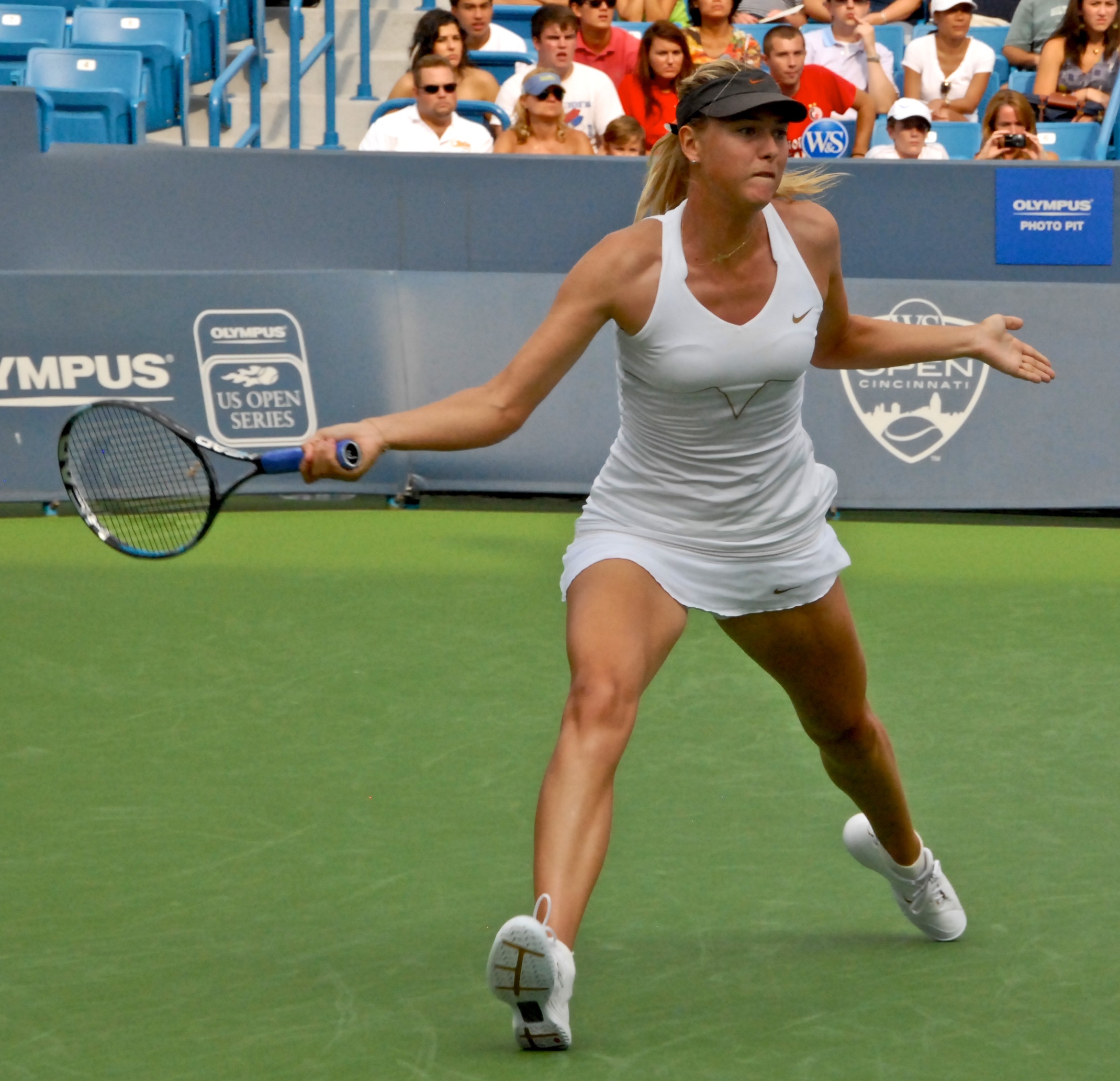
Sharapova at the Western & Southern Open, August 2011

During the clay-court season, Sharapova participated in the Madrid Open, where she lost to Dominika Cibulková in the third round, and the Italian Open, where she was seeded seventh. She defeated top seed Caroline Wozniacki in the semifinals and sixth seed Samantha Stosur in the final to take home the title, marking her biggest clay-court victory to date. At the 2011 French Open, Sharapova was seeded seventh. She defeated French wildcard Caroline Garcia in the second round, despite trailing 3–6, 1–4, before winning the last 11 games of the match. In the quarterfinals, she defeated 15th seed Andrea Petkovic, marking her first Grand Slam semifinal since her comeback from the career-threatening shoulder injury. She then lost to sixth seed and eventual champion, Li Na, in the semifinals, ending her clay season with a win–loss record of 12–2.

At the Wimbledon Championships, Sharapova had not dropped a set entering the final, before losing to eighth seed Petra Kvitová, in straight sets. This marked her first final in over three years at a Grand Slam event. Sharapova started her summer hard-court season at the Bank of the West Classic in Stanford, California. In a highly anticipated match, Sharapova lost to the eventual champion Serena Williams in the quarterfinals. In her next event at the Rogers Cup in Toronto, Sharapova lost to Galina Voskoboeva in the third round, marking her 100th career loss.

Sharapova then contested the Cincinnati Open. As the fourth seed, she received a bye into the second round. On the way to her fourth final of the year, she beat Anastasia Rodionova, 14th seed Svetlana Kuznetsova, tenth seed Samantha Stosur, and 2nd seed Vera Zvonareva. In the final, she defeated fellow former world No. 1 Jelena Janković, in 2 hours and 49 minutes, making it the longest WTA tour final of the year. She subsequently moved up to world No. 4, her highest ranking since August 2008 and the highest since her comeback from her shoulder injury.

Sharapova entered the US Open, where she was seeded third. She beat Heather Watson, and Anastasiya Yakimova, to reach the third round. She was then upset by Flavia Pennetta. However, because of the fall of Kim Clijsters and Vera Zvonareva in the rankings, Sharapova climbed to world No. 2. Sharapova's next tournament was the Pan Pacific Open in Tokyo, Japan. As second seed, she received a bye into the second round, where she beat Tamarine Tanasugarn. She then beat 13th seed Julia Görges, before retiring against Petra Kvitová in the quarterfinal, 3–4, after slipping on the baseline, suffering an ankle injury. This also forced her to withdraw from the China Open the following week. Sharapova then flew to Istanbul to prepare for the 2011 WTA Tour Championships, her first time qualifying since 2007. During the WTA Tour Championships, Sharapova withdrew during the round-robin stage after defeats against Samantha Stosur and Li Na, as a result of the ankle injury she had suffered in Tokyo. Sharapova ended the year as No. 4 in the world, her first top-10 finish since 2008 and first top-5 finish since 2007.

=== 2012: Career Grand Slam, back to No. 1 and Olympic silver ===
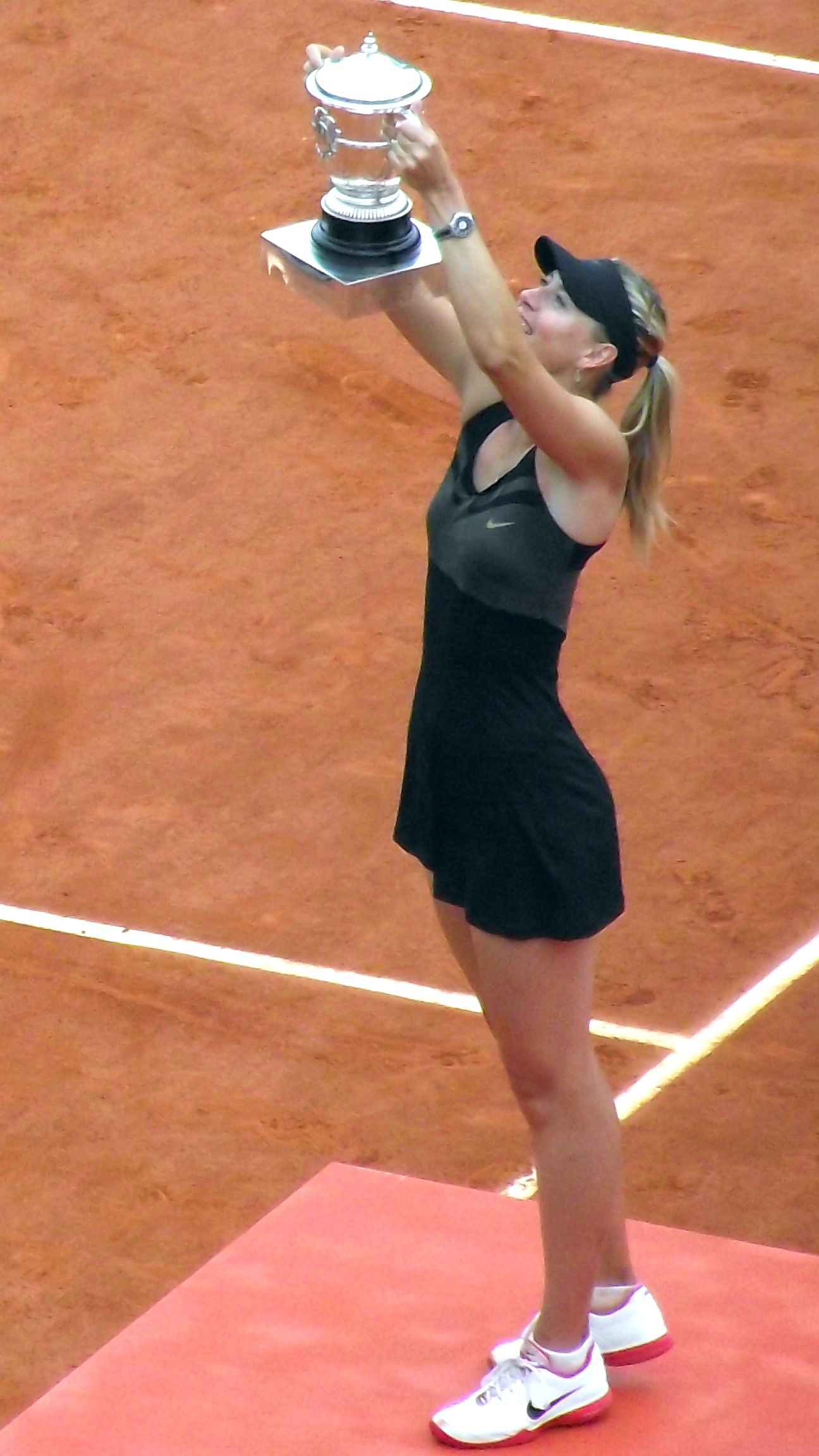
Sharapova completed the Career Grand Slam after winning the 2012 French Open

Sharapova withdrew from the 2012 Brisbane International because of her ongoing ankle injury. Her first tournament of the season was the 2012 Australian Open, where she was seeded fourth. Sharapova advanced to the final, defeating Gisela Dulko, Jamie Hampton, 30th seed Angelique Kerber, 14th seed Sabine Lisicki, compatriot Ekaterina Makarova and world No. 2, Petra Kvitová. In a match that decided who would become the new world No. 1, she lost to Victoria Azarenka, in straight sets. As a result, her ranking improved to world No. 3 behind Azarenka and Kvitová. She then played in the Open GDF Suez in Paris, where she lost in the quarterfinals to eventual champion Angelique Kerber. As a result, her ranking improved to world No. 2.

At the Indian Wells Open, after battling for over three hours, Sharapova defeated compatriot Maria Kirilenko to set up a semifinal meeting with Ana Ivanovic. Sharapova advanced to the final after Ivanovic retired due to a hip injury. In the final, she played world No. 1 Victoria Azarenka in a rematch of the Australian Open final, but lost again in straight sets. Sharapova's next tournament was the 2012 Sony Ericsson Open, where she was seeded 2nd and received a bye. In the final, Sharapova lost in straight sets to fifth seed Agnieszka Radwańska. This was her third loss of the year in finals out of four tournaments played so far. In the Porsche Grand Prix in Stuttgart, Sharapova was seeded second. She had a bye in the first round, and advanced to the third round after Alizé Cornet retired in the second set. She won her first title of the year in Stuttgart after defeating world number one Victoria Azarenka. In doing so, Sharapova defeated three current Grand Slam title holders to win the tournament. Sharapova then played the Madrid Open, a Premier Mandatory event. In the third round, Sharapova's opponent Lucie Šafářová was unable to compete and withdrew from the tournament, earning Sharapova a walkover into the quarterfinals. She was then beaten by eventual champion Serena Williams, in straight sets.

As the defending champion and second seed at the Italian Open, Sharapova had a bye in the first round. In the semifinals, Sharapova defeated Angelique Kerber to advance to the final for the second year in a row. In the final, Sharapova saved match point for a 2-hour 52-minute win over Li Na for her 26th career title. This marked the fourth time Sharapova had successfully defended a title.

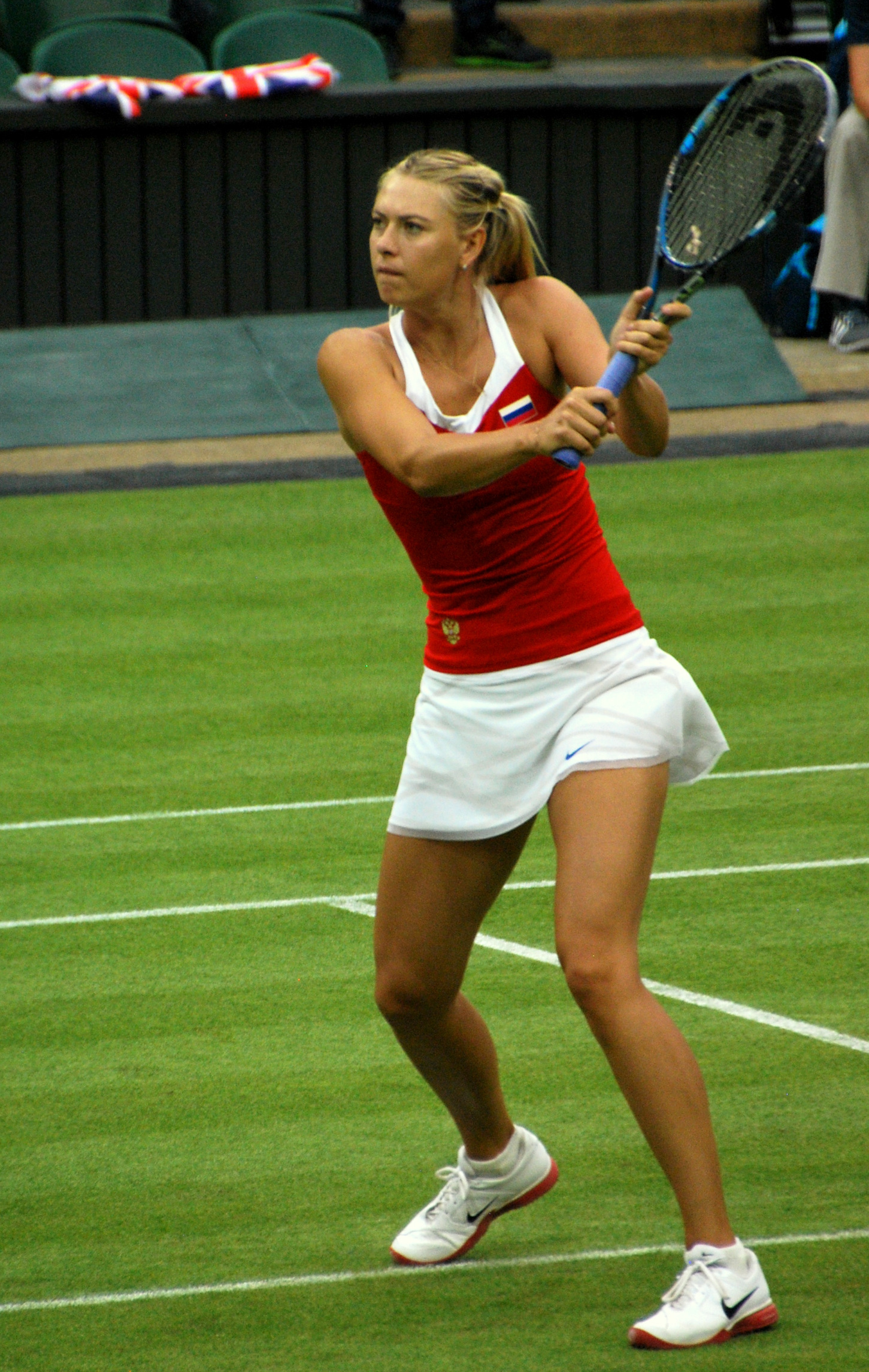
Sharapova at the 2012 Summer Olympics, July 2012

Sharapova was seeded second at the French Open, where she defeated Alexandra Cadanțu, Ayumi Morita, 28th seed Peng Shuai, Klára Koukalová, Kaia Kanepi and Petra Kvitová on her way to the finals, allowing her to regain the world No. 1 ranking. In the final, she defeated Sara Errani for her fourth career Grand Slam title (her first since 2008) and her first French Open title. Sharapova became only the tenth woman to complete a Career Grand Slam with the French Open victory. During the tournament, Sharapova was asked by the Russian Olympic Committee to bear the flag at the opening ceremony for the 2012 Summer Olympics, becoming the first female Russian athlete to receive this honor.

Sharapova decided not to compete in any of the grass-court warm-up events and instead proceeded straight to the Wimbledon Championships, where she was the top seed at a major event for the first time since the 2008 French Open. She breezed through her first three matches over Anastasia Rodionova, Tsvetana Pironkova and the crafty Hsieh Su-wei, extended her winning streak to 15 matches. However, she was upset in the fourth round in straight sets by the 15th-seeded Sabine Lisicki, whom she beat in the previous year's semifinals. Due to being unable to defend her finalist points from the year before, she relinquished the world No. 1 ranking back to Azarenka.

She made her Olympic debut at the 2012 Summer Olympics in London and was seeded third in the singles draw. She easily beat Shahar Pe'er and hometown favorite Laura Robson in straight sets, before avenging her defeat against Lisicki four weeks prior by beating the German in the third round in a tight three-set match. In the quarterfinals, Sharapova defeated fellow former No. 1, Kim Clijsters, to advance to the semifinals, where she faced her compatriot, Maria Kirilenko. Sharapova defeated Kirilenko to reach the Olympic final and guarantee a medal. Facing off against rival Serena Williams, with both players looking for their first Olympic singles gold medal (and a chance to complete a career Golden Slam), Sharapova was thrashed by Williams in what was to be her worst defeat to the American, winning only a single game. Nonetheless, with this performance, Sharapova won an Olympic silver medal and overtook Agnieszka Radwańska as world No. 2.

Sharapova did not compete in any of the summer hard-court warm-up events after the Olympics, pulling out of both Montreal and Cincinnati (where she was the defending champion) due to a stomach virus. Seeded third at the US Open, Sharapova breezed through her first three matches against Melinda Czink, Lourdes Domínguez Lino, and Mallory Burdette, losing a total of just seven games. In the fourth round, compatriot Nadia Petrova took it to a third set and was winning until a rain delay. After the delay, Sharapova came back to win, advancing to the quarterfinals of the US Open for the first time since she won the tournament in 2006. In the quarterfinals, she faced 11th seed Marion Bartoli, who was 4–0 up before a rain delay, which delayed the match a whole day. Sharapova then came back from a set down to win. In the semifinals, Sharapova lost to world No. 1 Victoria Azarenka despite winning the first set.

Sharapova's next tournament was the Pan Pacific Open in Tokyo. She made it to the quarterfinals, losing to Samantha Stosur. At the China Open she was seeded second. In the finals she was again defeated by Azarenka. Sharapova's next tournament was the year-end championships in Istanbul, where she was seeded second. She defeated Sara Errani, Agnieszka Radwańska, and Samantha Stosur in the round-robin matches. In the semifinals, Sharapova beat Azarenka, bringing their head-to-head meetings to 7–5 in Azarenka's favour. Although Sharapova made it to the final, Azarenka clinched the year-end No. 1 ranking with her two round-robin wins. She lost to Serena Williams for the 9th consecutive time in the final and the third time that year, notching her best score line in three matchups with a 4–6, 3–6 defeat.

=== 2013: Third shoulder injury ===
Sharapova's first scheduled tournament of the 2013 season was the Brisbane International, where she was seeded second. However, she withdrew from the tournament before it began, citing a collarbone injury. She started her season at the Australian Open seeded second. She defeated Olga Puchkova and Misaki Doi in the first two rounds without losing a game in either match, the first time a player won in back-to-back double bagels at a Grand Slam tournament since the 1985 Australian Open. Sharapova then defeated Venus Williams, Kirsten Flipkens, and Ekaterina Makarova, where in losing nine games, she overtook Monica Seles' record of fewest games dropped heading into a Grand Slam semifinal. She lost to Li Na in the semifinals.

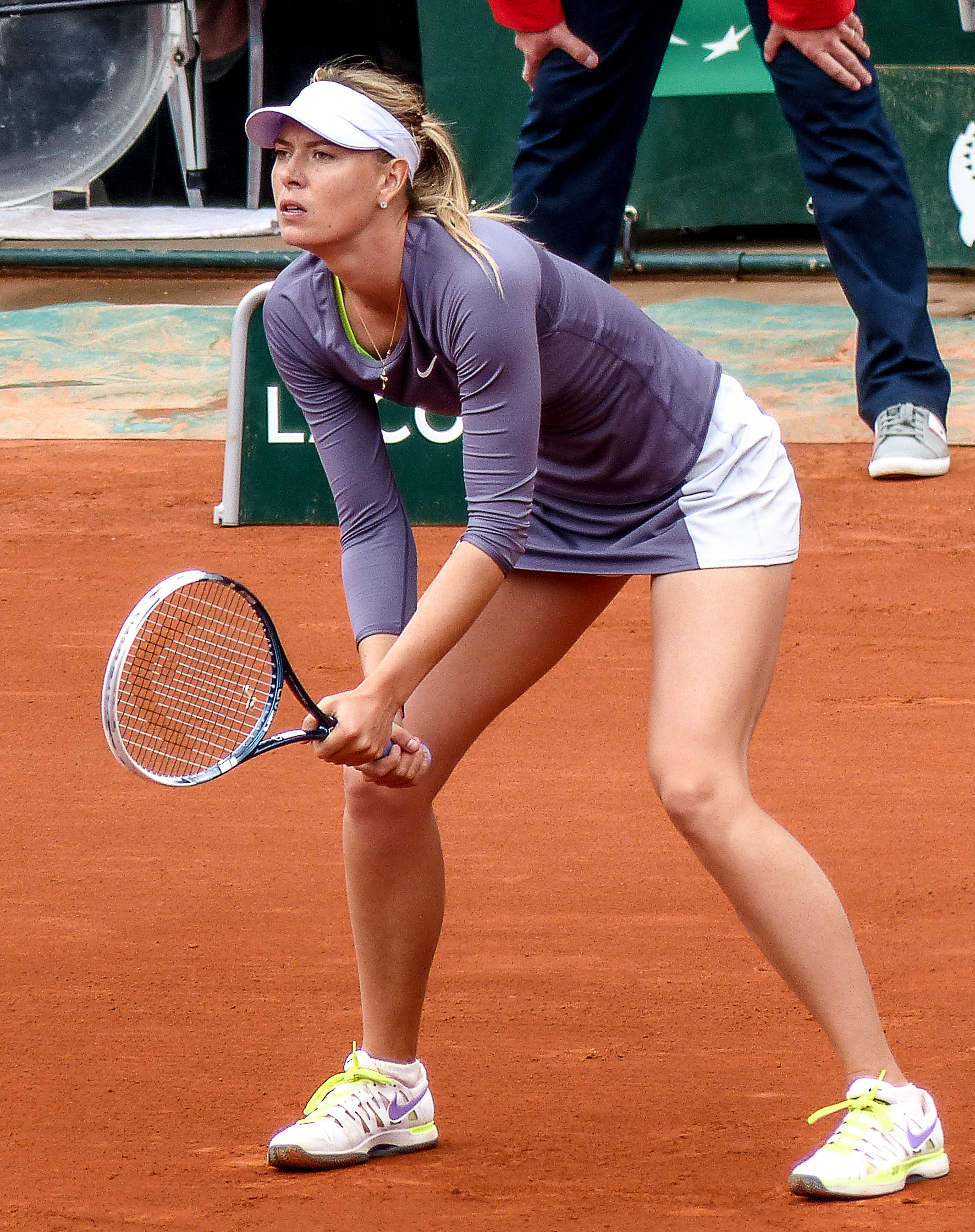
Sharapova at the French Open, May 2013

She reached the semifinals at the Qatar Open, losing to Serena Williams for the 10th straight time in her career. Her next tournament was Indian Wells, where she was seeded second. She received a bye into the second round and successfully reached the final without dropping a set, where she faced 2011 Indian wells champion and former world No. 1, Caroline Wozniacki. After an hour and twenty-one minutes, Sharapova won the tournament. This was Sharapova's 28th career title and second at Indian Wells. Her win also made her the No. 2 player in the world behind Serena Williams.

Sharapova then competed at the Sony Open. Once again she reached the final without dropping a set and faced world No. 1, Serena Williams. Maria won the first set. However, Serena won the second and dominated the third set. This was Maria's 11th consecutive loss against Serena.

Next, she played at the indoor clay event in Stuttgart, where she was the defending champion. Her first three matches were long three-setters: she first beat world No. 25, Lucie Šafářová, dropping the second set on a tiebreak, then Ana Ivanovic, then in the semifinals, she won against third seed Angelique Kerber. In the final, in what was her ninth victory against the Chinese out of 14 matches, she beat second seed world No. 5 Li Na in straight sets to win her 29th career title.

A week later, she competed at the Madrid Open, reaching the final, again without dropping a set. She faced Serena Williams for the 15th time, losing for the 12th consecutive time in straight sets.

Next, she played in Rome, where she was seeded second and had a bye in the first round. She beat 16th seed Sloane Stephens in straight sets (with the loss of three games) in the third round, but then did not play her quarterfinal match against seventh seed Sara Errani and retired from the tournament due to a viral illness.

At the French Open, Sharapova reached the final again, beating Azarenka in three sets in the semifinals, but there she lost in straight sets to Serena Williams. At Wimbledon she was comprehensively beaten in the second round by qualifier Michelle Larcher de Brito. Sharapova then returned to the tour at the Western & Southern Open, where she lost her opening match to Sloane Stephens in three sets. A week later Sharapova withdrew from the US Open, citing a shoulder injury, which prematurely ended her season.

=== 2014: Comeback and second French Open title ===
Sharapova had not played since August 2013 due to a recurring shoulder injury and made her comeback at the Brisbane International. She advanced to the semifinals where she was beaten in straight sets by Serena Williams. At the Australian Open, Sharapova, ranked third, was knocked out of the tournament in the fourth round by the 20th seed, and eventual finalist, Dominika Cibulková. Sharapova lost the match in three sets. She then participated in Open GdF Suez where she was upset in the semifinals to fellow Russian and eventual tournament winner Anastasia Pavlyuchenkova, in three sets.

In March, playing in the Indian Wells Open, she was beaten by 22-year-old Italian Camila Giorgi in the third round, in three sets. This dropped her ranking to world No. 7. She reached the semifinals in Miami, facing Serena Williams in a rematch of last year's final and lost her 15th consecutive match to Williams. In April, she won the Stuttgart Open, her first title of the year and 30th of her career by defeating Ana Ivanovic in three sets. Stuttgart is the only tournament Sharapova won three times. In May, Sharapova won the Madrid Open, her second title of the year and first in Madrid, defeating Simona Halep in three sets. With nine clay titles, she joined Venus Williams as the third most successful active player on the surface. Sharapova then competed in the Italian Open in Rome, where she made the third round. She lost to Ana Ivanovic in straight sets.

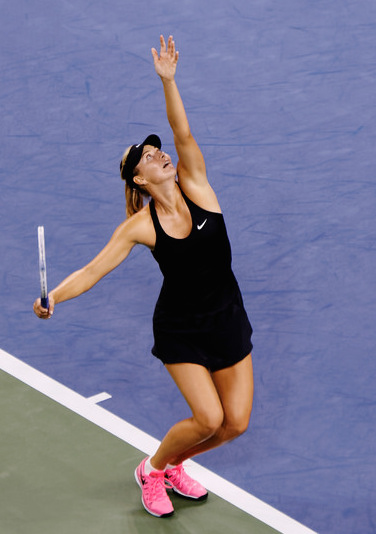
Sharapova serving at the 2014 US Open

Sharapova was seeded seventh at the French Open and defeated Ksenia Pervak, Tsvetana Pironkova, and Paula Ormaechea in the first three rounds, all in straight sets. In the fourth round, she defeated Samantha Stosur, reeling off nine straight games from a set and 3–4 down. This marked her 14th win in 16 meetings with the Australian. In the quarterfinals, she defeated Garbiñe Muguruza, again coming back from a set down, to reach the semifinals at the French for the fourth consecutive year. In the semifinals, she defeated Eugenie Bouchard, once again coming back from a set down, to reach her third consecutive French Open final. In the final, she defeated Simona Halep in three sets to win her second French Open title and fifth overall Major title. This was the first time since 2001 that a third set was contested in the final. The match took just over three hours and has been described as one of the best women's finals in recent years. At Wimbledon, Sharapova reached the fourth round, where she lost to Angelique Kerber, the ninth seed, in three sets.

Sharapova then played the Rogers Cup in Montreal where she was the fourth seed. She received a first round bye and faced Garbiñe Muguruza in her opener, she won in three sets. In the following round she lost in three sets to Muguruza's compatriot, Carla Suárez Navarro. At the Western & Southern Open, Sharapova was seeded fifth and defeated Madison Keys after having a first round bye. She then went on to defeat Pavlyuchenkova and newly crowned world No. 2, Simona Halep, to reach the last four. She faced Ivanovic again but lost in a roller coaster three-setter despite having two match points. Sharapova then travelled to New York for the US Open where she was the 5th seed. She defeated compatriot Maria Kirilenko and Romanian Alexandra Dulgheru before overcoming 26th seeded German Sabine Lisicki in round 3 to set up a clash with Caroline Wozniacki in the round of 16. Sharapova lost to Wozniacki in three sets.

Sharapova next played the inaugural Wuhan Open where she was seeded fourth. After receiving a first-round bye, she defeated compatriot Svetlana Kuznetsova in three sets and next faced Timea Bacsinszky. Although Sharapova won their two previous encounters, she was stunned by Timea in two tight sets, thus ending her campaign at the Premier-5 tournament.

The following week, Sharapova played the China Open in Beijing, a Premier Mandatory-level tournament. Reaching the final without dropping a set, Sharapova defeated world No. 9 Ana Ivanovic in the semifinals. In the final, Sharapova met reigning Wimbledon champion and world No. 3, Petra Kvitová. Sharapova won the match in 2 hours 30 minutes, defeating the Czech in three sets. By virtue of the win, Sharapova's ranking rose from No. 4 to No. 2 in the world and she secured herself the second seeding for the WTA year-end Championship. Sharapova closed in on the year-end number-one ranking spot, 467 points behind Williams.

Sharapova was ranked No. 2 heading into the WTA Tour Championships, with a chance of overtaking Serena Williams as world No. 1. She was drawn in the white group, with Kvitová, Radwańska, and Wozniacki. Her first match was a three set loss to Wozniacki. Sharapova also lost her second round robin match to Kvitová in straight sets. She ended the year with a win against Radwańska in three sets, finishing third overall in the White Group. She ended the year as world No. 2, behind Serena Williams.

=== 2015: Fourth Australian Open final ===
Sharapova kicked off her 2015 season at the Brisbane International where she was top seed and received a bye in the first round. Sharapova defeated Yaroslava Shvedova and Carla Suárez Navarro. In the semifinals, Sharapova faced Elina Svitolina, beating her in straight sets. Reaching the final without dropping a set, Sharapova played an intense match against second seed Ana Ivanovic but came through in three sets. This was Sharapova's tenth win over Ivanovic and by winning her 34th title, it meant that Sharapova had won at least one title every year for 13 consecutive years. Also, it was just her second title in Australia so far, beating Ivanovic both times. Sharapova's next tournament was the Australian Open, where she beat Petra Martić and fellow countrywoman Alexandra Panova (despite having two match points against her) in the first two rounds, before beating Zarina Diyas and Peng Shuai in straight sets. There, she beat seventh-seeded Eugenie Bouchard and Ekaterina Makarova, in straight sets, to make her fourth Australian Open final, where she lost to Serena Williams in straight sets, worsening her record against her to 2–17. In February, following her participation in the Fed Cup, Sharapova played in Acapulco, where she beat Shelby Rogers, Mariana Duque Mariño and Magdaléna Rybáriková to advance the semifinals. Sharapova later withdrew from her match against Caroline Garcia, citing a stomach virus. Next, in Indian Wells, she beat Yanina Wickmayer and Victoria Azarenka in straight sets, before losing to defending champion Flavia Pennetta in the fourth round in three sets. After receiving a bye in the first round of the Miami Open, Sharapova lost in the second round to fellow Russian Daria Gavrilova in straight sets, marking her earliest exit from the tournament since her first appearance in Miami in 2003.

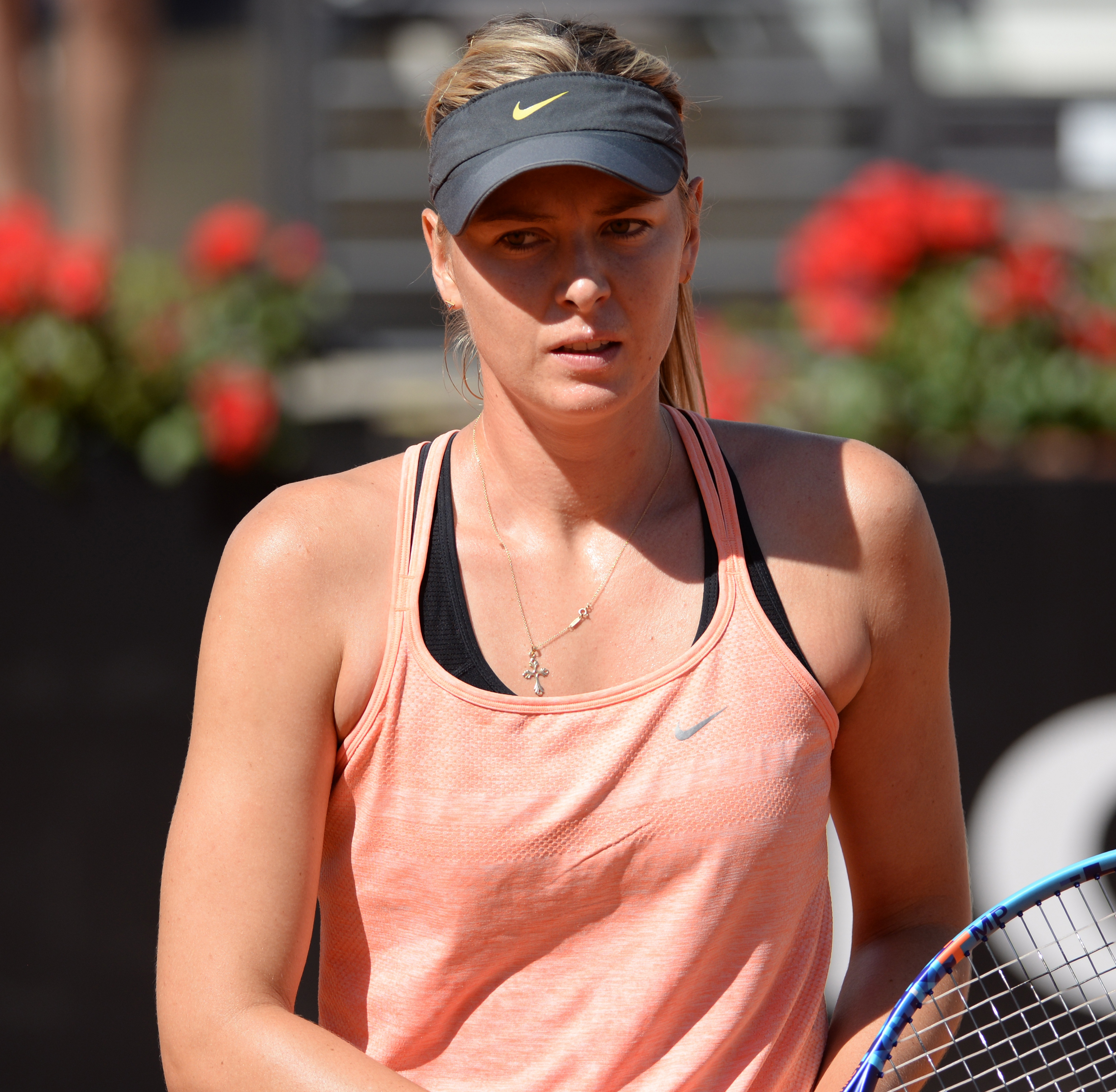
Sharapova in 2015

Sharapova began her clay season in Stuttgart where she was the three-time defending champion. After receiving a first-round bye, she lost in the second round to Angelique Kerber in three sets, snapping Sharapova's win streak at the tournament and marking her first-ever loss at the tournament, having won it three times in a row (2012, 2013, & 2014). The loss also snapped a 64 match win streak on clay where Sharapova won the first set and went on to win the match. The last time Sharapova lost a match on clay, after winning the first set was against Dinara Safina in the fourth round at the 2008 French Open. As a result of the loss, Sharapova lost the No. 2 ranking to Simona Halep. Sharapova's next clay court tournament was the Madrid Open, where she was the defending champion. She advanced to the semifinals. There, she was beaten by Svetlana Kuznetsova for the first time since 2008. Sharapova's next tournament was the Italian Open in Rome where she was seeded third. She beat Victoria Azarenka in the quarterfinals in straight sets to set up a rematch with Daria Gavrilova. She beat Gavrilova in straight sets to advance to the final, where she faced Carla Suárez Navarro. After losing the first set, Sharapova managed to claim the next two sets and her third Rome title. By winning Rome, Sharapova temporarily reclaimed the No. 2 ranking over Halep. Sharapova was seeded fourth at Wimbledon and reached the semifinals, where she lost to Serena Williams (the eventual champion) in straight sets. After Wimbledon, she withdrew from the US Open, citing a knee injury. This caused her to lose the No. 2 ranking to Halep again.

She then received a wildcard into Wuhan Open and received a bye into the second round. However, she retired in her match against Barbora Strýcová in the 3rd set, citing a left forearm injury. She then withdrew from the China Open, where she was the defending champion, to recover in time for the WTA Finals and the Fed Cup final. At the WTA Finals, she was drawn into the red group, alongside Simona Halep, Agnieszka Radwańska, and Flavia Pennetta. She then won all three of her round-robin matches and achieved 1st position in her group. Her win over Pennetta also marked the last match of the Italian's career. Sharapova then played the player who finished 2nd in the White Group, Petra Kvitová. She lost the match in straight sets, despite having a 5–1 lead in the second set.

Sharapova then played in the Fed Cup final, winning both of her matches, against Karolína Plíšková and got revenge against Petra Kvitová for her loss in the WTA Finals. However, Russia eventually lost 2–3 after falling in a crucial doubles rubber. The Russian ended the season as the world No. 4, despite not playing the US Open Series and missing most of the Fall Asian Hardcourt season. She had a win–loss record of 39–9 and won two titles, reaching the second week in all of the Grand Slams she played.

=== 2016: More injuries and doping suspension ===
Sharapova began her 2016 season at the Brisbane International where she was the defending champion. She would have faced Ekaterina Makarova in the first round, but withdrew hours before the match, citing a left forearm injury, and was replaced by Margarita Gasparyan.

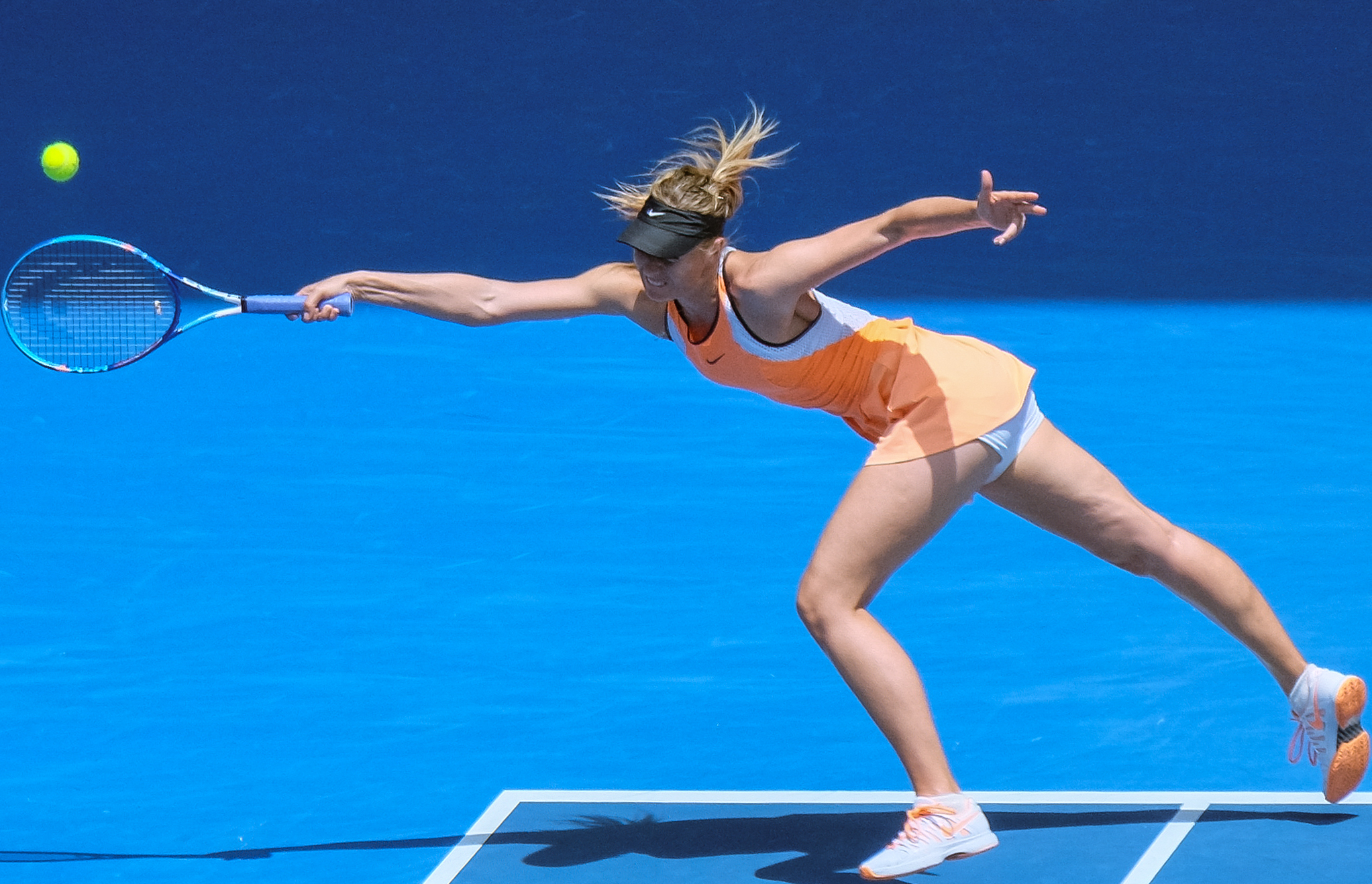
Sharapova at the 2016 Australian Open, her last Grand Slam appearance before the suspension

Due to Agnieszka Radwańska winning the Shenzhen Open, Sharapova was seeded fifth at the Australian Open. She was drawn to face Nao Hibino in the first round and won in straight sets. She then won her second round match against Aliaksandra Sasnovich, also in straight sets. Sharapova then lost her first set in the tournament as she defeated Lauren Davis, in three sets. In the fourth round, she then played her first career match against Belinda Bencic and won in two tight sets over two hours of play. Sharapova then faced Serena Williams in the quarterfinal, a repeat of the previous year's final. Although she started the match brightly, she was defeated in straight sets. She failed to defend her finalist points from the previous year and fell to sixth in the rankings after the tournament.

After the Australian Open, Sharapova was nominated by team captain Anastasia Myskina to play the Fed Cup, but she had a forearm injury and was only listed for the doubles match. Russia lost the first three matches and chose Makarova to replace Sharapova for the dead doubles match. In the end, Russia lost 3–1 but by being nominated for the match, Sharapova successfully qualified for the Summer Olympics having played sufficient Fed Cup matches to meet the criteria.

Citing the left forearm injury sustained at the start of the year, Sharapova withdrew from the Qatar Open, and a week before the BNP Paribas Open, she withdrew from that for the same reason.

Following a failed drug test from the 2016 Australian Open, in which she tested positive for meldonium, a substance that had been banned, effective January 1, 2016, by the World Anti-Doping Agency (WADA), Sharapova was provisionally suspended from competitive tennis with effect from March 12. On June 8 she was banned for two years by the International Tennis Federation. Russian sports minister Vitaly Mutko has implied that Sharapova was targeted due to the political crisis in Russian-American relations. In October 2016, Sharapova's ban was reduced from 24 months (2 years) to 15 months, starting from January 26, 2016, the date of the drug test she had failed.

=== 2017: Return from suspension, first WTA title in two years ===
Sharapova returned to the WTA Tour in April 2017. She was given wildcards to compete in the following three WTA tournaments: Women's Stuttgart Open, Madrid Open and Italian Open. She played her first match of her comeback on April 26 at the Porsche Grand Prix, a tournament that she had previously won on three occasions. Her first-round opponent was Italian Roberta Vinci, who she went on to defeat in straight sets to advance to the second round, making it her first victory since her return. In her on-court interview Sharapova said, "The first few seconds before you enter the arena – it's been a stage of mine since I was a young girl – I've been waiting for this moment for a long time." She followed it up with another straight sets victory over Ekaterina Makarova in the second round. In the quarterfinals, she defeated qualifier Anett Kontaveit in straight sets, before losing to Kristina Mladenovic in the semifinals.

Sharapova then took part in the Madrid Open where she defeated Mirjana Lučić-Baroni in three sets. Sharapova played a second round encounter with Eugenie Bouchard which after three sets Sharapova lost. In the 2017 Internazionali BNL d'Italia opening match she defeated Christina McHale in straight sets. In her next match, she again faced the 16th seed Mirjana Lučić-Baroni in a rematch of their encounter in Madrid. At one set apiece, Sharapova needed a medical timeout for her thigh, which ultimately forced her to retire in the third set. Just before the players came on court, French Federation president Bernard Giudicelli announced that Sharapova would not be receiving a wildcard in the main draw or the qualifying draw, preventing her from playing in the 2017 French Open.

Sharapova then received a wildcard to play Birmingham Classic. However, the same thigh injury at the Italian Open forced her to withdraw from the entire grass season, including the Wimbledon qualifying rounds. Sharapova was given another wildcard at the Stanford Classic, her first hard court tournament since the 2016 Australian Open. Her first round opponent was Jennifer Brady, whom she defeated in three sets. The win also pushed Sharapova back inside the top 150. Sharapova withdrew from the next round with a left arm injury. She was set to make a return at the Canadian Open, where she had received a wildcard, but ultimately withdrew due to a left arm injury. She was set to play the Cincinnati Open as a wildcard but pulled out to be fully fit for the US Open, which had also granted Sharapova a wildcard entry. She opened the US Open against world No. 2, Simona Halep, and won in three sets, her first US Open win since the 2014 US Open. In the second round she defeated Tímea Babos, coming from a set down to win in three. In the third round, she played the American wildcard Sofia Kenin, an 18-year-old who was making her first main draw appearance in a major. Sharapova defeated the teenager in tight straight sets to advance to the second week of the US Open. She was defeated by 16th seed Anastasija Sevastova in the fourth round.

Sharapova received and accepted wildcards to enter the China Open and Tianjin Open, both held in China. In her opening match at the China Open, Sharapova once again faced Sevastova, this time prevailing in a three-hour, three-set match. In the second round, Sharapova defeated Ekaterina Makarova, seeing her move back into the top 100 for the first time since before her suspension. In the third round, Sharapova lost to Simona Halep in straight sets, marking her first loss to the Romanian after seven consecutive victories. Sharapova then remained in China for the Tianjin Open, which was her first appearance at the tournament. Sharapova went on to win the tournament, marking her first WTA title since 2015, without dropping a set, including coming back from 1–4 down in the first set and 1–5 down in the second set against 19-year-old Aryna Sabalenka in the final. The result saw her eventually climb the rankings into the top 60, and she later received another wildcard to enter the Kremlin Cup. Sharapova recorded her first opening round loss since 2013, with a straight-sets loss to eighth seed Magdaléna Rybáriková.

=== 2018: Return to top 25 and French Open quarterfinal ===
Sharapova began her 2018 season at the Shenzhen Open. She defeated Mihaela Buzărnescu, Alison Riske and Zarina Diyas to advance to the semifinals, where she fell to defending champion Kateřina Siniaková. Sharapova then returned to the Australian Open for the first time since her suspension, defeating Tatjana Maria and Anastasija Sevastova in the opening two rounds, before losing to Angelique Kerber in straight sets in the third round. Sharapova received a wildcard to enter the Qatar Open, losing in three sets to Monica Niculescu in the opening round. Sharapova pulled out of the Dubai Tennis Championships due to citing a forearm strain. Sharapova played the Indian Wells Open falling in the opening round to Naomi Osaka in straight sets. Sharapova was set to play the Miami Open but withdrew due to a forearm injury.

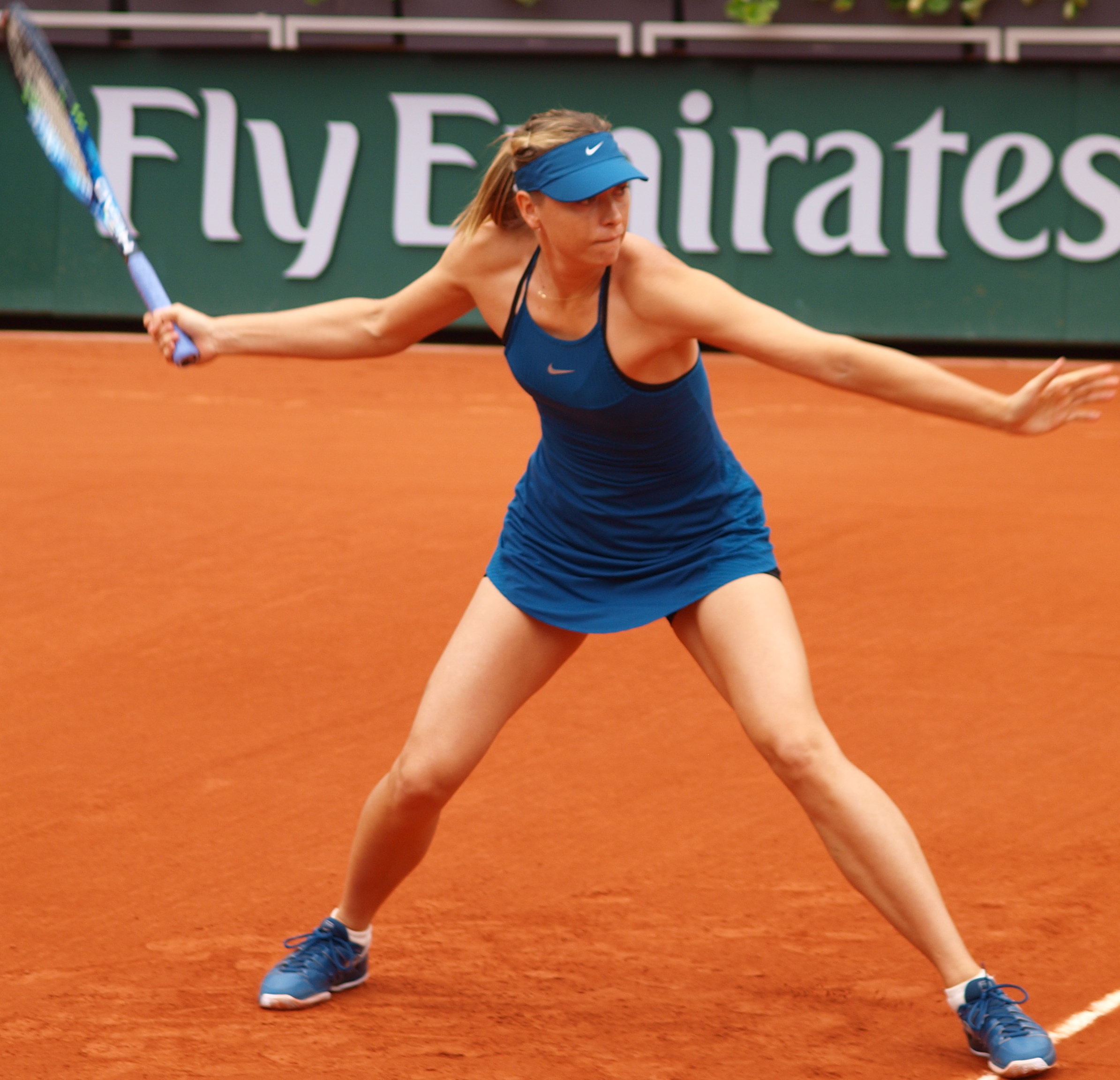
Sharapova at the 2018 French Open

Sharapova started her clay court season at the Porsche Tennis Grand Prix. Sharapova faced sixth seed Caroline Garcia in the opening round but lost in three tight sets. This was her fourth consecutive loss, marking her fall out of the top 50. Sharapova ended her losing streak with a straight sets win over Mihaela Buzărnescu at the Madrid Open. Sharapova defeated Irina-Camelia Begu, and Kristina Mladenovic in straight sets to advance to quarterfinals. Sharapova fell to Kiki Bertens in three sets, despite the loss, she climbed back inside the top 40. Sharapova began her Italian Open campaign with a three set win over 16th seed Ashleigh Barty. In the second round, Sharapova defeated Dominika Cibulková in three sets, following it up with a straight sets victory over Daria Gavrilova in the third round. From a set down, she went on to defeat world No. 5 Jeļena Ostapenko in the quarterfinals. Despite taking the opening set in the semifinals, Sharapova's run in Rome ended with a three set loss to world No. 1, Simona Halep. Despite the loss, her performance improved her ranking inside the top 30 and being seeded for the first time since her suspension at the 2016 Australian Open.

Sharapova began her 2018 French Open campaign with a three set win over Richèl Hogenkamp and continued with a straight set win over Croatia's Donna Vekić in the second round. In the third round, she defeated world No. 6, Karolína Plíšková in straight sets to advance to the second week of the French Open. In the fourth round, Sharapova was set to play Serena Williams, but Williams withdrew due to injury, giving Sharapova a walkover into her first Grand Slam quarterfinal since the 2016 Australian Open. Sharapova's run ended with a straight sets loss to world No. 3 Garbiñe Muguruza in the quarterfinals.

Sharapova was set to play the Birmingham Classic but withdrew to fully recover ahead of Wimbledon. Sharapova played two exhibition matches, losing her debut to Greece's Maria Sakkari but defeating Natalia Vikhlyantseva. Sharapova exited Wimbledon with a three set lost to Vitalia Diatchenko despite being up a set and serving for the match. This marked her worst Grand Slam result since the 2010 Australian Open and her first ever opening round loss at Wimbledon. Sharapova was set to play at the Silicon Valley Classic but withdrew due to a change in her schedule. Sharapova played at the Rogers Cup and recorded straight sets wins over Sesil Karatantcheva and Daria Kasatkina. Sharapova lost in the third round to world No. 6, Caroline Garcia, in straight sets. Sharapova was set to play at the Western & Southern Open but withdrew before the tournament started. Sharapova began her US Open campaign in the opening round, with a straight sets win over Patty Schnyder. Sharapova continued her run with straight set wins over Sorana Cîrstea and Jeļena Ostapenko. In the fourth round, Sharapova's run ended with a straight sets loss to Carla Suárez Navarro. This marked the first time Sharapova had lost in the night session at Arthur Ashe Stadium, previously having a 22–0 record. Sharapova ended her season with withdraws at the China Open, Tianjin Open and Kremlin Cup with a right shoulder injury. Sharapova ended the season ranked 29.

=== 2019: 800th match and more injuries ===
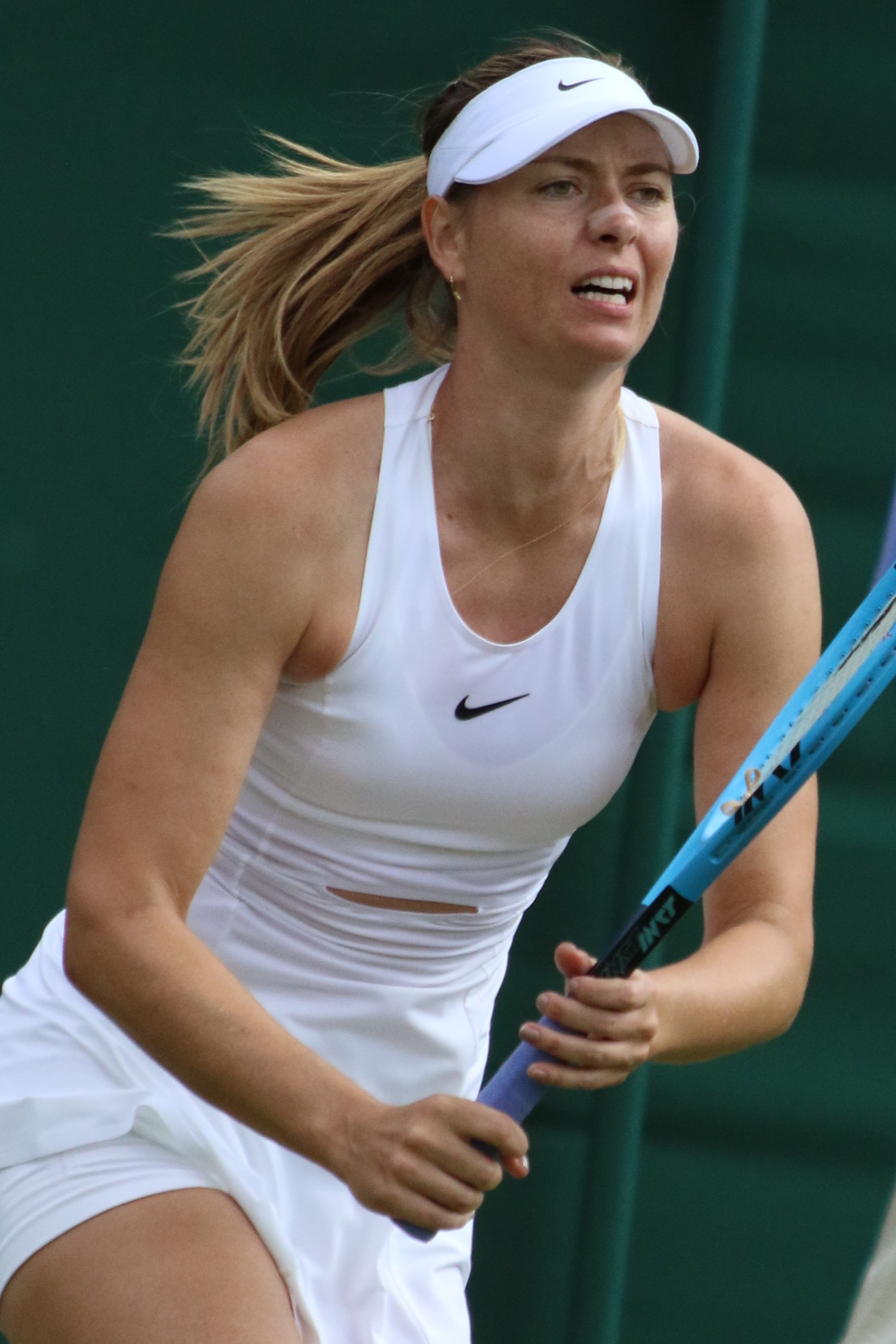
Sharapova in 2019

Sharapova began her 2019 season at the Shenzhen Open. In the opening round, she defeated Timea Bacsinszky in straight sets which was also her 800th career singles match. In the second round, Sharapova defeated Wang Xinyu after Wang retired in the second set. In the quarterfinals, Sharapova lost to Aryna Sabalenka after she retired in the second set. Sharapova started her Australian Open campaign without the loss of a game in a win over Harriet Dart. Sharapova followed up with a straight set win over Rebecca Peterson and a three set victory over defending champion Caroline Wozniacki. Sharapova's run ended with a three set loss to Ashleigh Barty in the fourth round. Sharapova recorded her first win in Russia in thirteen years with a straight sets win over Daria Gavrilova at the 2019 St. Petersburg Ladies' Trophy. Sharapova withdrew from her second round match against Daria Kasatkina. Sharapova was set to play at the Indian Wells Open and Miami Open but withdrew before the tournaments started due to a shoulder injury for which she stated she was to have minor surgery to repair a fraying tendon and a labrum tear. Sharapova later withdrew from the Porsche Tennis Grand Prix, Madrid Open, Italian Open and French Open due to not being able to compete at her highest level because of her lingering shoulder injury.

Sharapova made a return after being away for over four months, in the grasscourt season at the Mallorca Open where she received a wild card. In the opening round, Sharapova defeated Viktória Kužmová in straight sets and recorded her first grasscourt win since 2015. Sharapova's run ended in the second round with a straight sets lost to Angelique Kerber. In the opening round at Wimbledon, Sharapova retired in the third set against Pauline Parmentier, despite being up a set and a break during the second set. Sharapova lost in the opening round of the Rogers Cup to Anett Kontaveit in three sets. Sharapova ended her three match losing streak with a straight sets win over Alison Riske in the opening round of the Western & Southern Open. In the second round, Sharapova was defeated by Ashleigh Barty in straight sets. Sharapova fell in the opening round of the US Open to eventual finalist Serena Williams in straight sets, it was also her final match of the year. She ended the year ranked No. 131, her lowest year-end ranking since 2002.

=== 2020: Retirement ===
Sharapova began her 2020 season at an exhibition tournament in Abu Dhabi, where she defeated Ajla Tomljanović in straight sets. Although she was scheduled to play exhibition at the Hawaii Open a week later, she pulled out of the tournament because she was unprepared. Sharapova received a wildcard at the Brisbane International and fell in the opening round to Jennifer Brady in three sets. Sharapova participated at the Kooyong Classic, where her opening match against Laura Siegemund was stopped after the second set due to heavy smoke from wildfires, before being defeated by Tomljanović in the second round. As a wildcard at the 2020 Australian Open, Sharapova was defeated in straight sets by Donna Vekić in the first round. This marked her third consecutive first-round loss at a Grand Slam tournament and, following the tournament, her ranking fell to no. 369, her lowest ranking since August 2002.

That defeat to Vekic in Melbourne would prove to be Sharapova's final match of her career, as on February 26, 2020, Sharapova announced her retirement from tennis. In an essay in Vanity Fair and Vogue, Sharapova wrote: "I'm new to this, so please forgive me. Tennis – I'm saying goodbye. But as I embark on my next chapter, I want anyone who dreams of excelling in anything to know that doubt and judgement are inevitable. You will fail hundreds of times and the world will watch you. Accept it. Trust yourself. I promise you that you will prevail."

=== WADA substance controversy ===
On March 7, 2016, Sharapova revealed that she had failed a drug test at the 2016 Australian Open, which she described as the result of an oversight. Sharapova admitted to testing positive for meldonium, an anti-ischemic drug usually prescribed for heart conditions that was added to the World Anti-Doping Agency (WADA)'s banned substances list on January 1, 2016. Sharapova was provisionally suspended by the International Tennis Federation (ITF) from playing tennis effective from March 12, 2016. She later released a statement regarding the test and explaining her use of the medicine:

I received a letter from the ITF that I failed a drugs test at the Australian Open. I take full responsibility for it. For the past ten years I have been given a medicine called mildronate by my family doctor and a few days ago after I received the ITF letter I found out that it also has another name of meldonium which I did not know. It is very important for you to understand that for ten years this medicine was not on WADA's banned list and I had legally been taking the medicine for the past ten years. But on January 1st [2016] the rules had changed and meldonium became a prohibited substance which I had not known. I was given this medicine by my doctor for several health issues that I was having in 2006.

Meldonium is not approved for use in the United States, Sharapova's country of residence; however, it is legal to use in Russia, the country that Sharapova represents in tennis. The drug's inventor Ivars Kalviņš said that he did not think taking it should be construed as "doping", but he also said that it "is very popular among athletes" and was used by the Soviet military for "optimizing the use of oxygen" and that it "allows athletes to train under maximum strain". Don Catlin, a long-time anti-doping expert and the scientific director of the Banned Substances Control Group (BSCG) stated that "There's really no evidence that there's any performance enhancement from meldonium – Zero percent."

Sharapova said that she had been taking the drug to treat magnesium deficiency, an irregular EKG and family history of diabetes, and indicated that she had not read an email informing her that meldonium had been banned for use in tennis. Meldonium's addition was outlined on a WADA and United States Anti-Doping Agency summary document and it has been reported that all tennis players were warned five times that it was due to be banned. On March 11, 2016, Sharapova denied reports about the five missed warnings via Facebook:

That's a distortion of the actual "communications" which were provided or simply posted onto a webpage. I make no excuses for not knowing about the ban. The other "communications"? They were buried in newsletters, websites, or handouts (many of them technical, in small print). I didn't take the medicine every day. I took it the way my doctor recommended I take it and I took it in the low doses recommended. I'm proud of how I have played the game. I have been honest and upfront. I won't pretend to be injured so I can hide the truth about my testing.

Most fellow tennis players reacted to Sharapova's announcement with little support or sympathy. John McEnroe and Pat Cash said they found it hard to believe her. Jennifer Capriati posted on Twitter that she should be stripped of her professional titles. Chris Evert expressed her surprise at the lack of support in tennis for Sharapova, noting that she "[had] always isolated herself from the rest of the tennis world, from the players". Serena Williams expressed surprise at Sharapova's announcement but commended her for being "upfront with what she had done". Roger Federer, Rafael Nadal and Andy Murray all publicly condemned Sharapova and argued that she deserved to be punished on the basis that she failed the doping test, with Murray adding that "Taking a drug you don't necessarily need because it's legal is wrong" and Federer stating that "Whether it's intentional or not, I don't see too much difference. You must be 100 percent about what you are taking". Sharapova's case prompted Federer to urge the tennis federation to conduct more anti-doping tests. Novak Djokovic said that he felt sorry for her, but that she must still be ready for punishment. The Russian Tennis Federation strongly defended Sharapova, describing the positive drug test as "nonsense" and adding that they expected Sharapova to be available for the 2016 Summer Olympics.

As a result of the failed drug test, Nike and TAG Heuer suspended their relationships with Sharapova, while Porsche postponed promotional work. Racquet manufacturer HEAD stood by Sharapova, saying, "We look forward to working with her", and announced that they intended to extend their contract. They also suggested that WADA should prove scientifically why the drug should be banned. The United Nations Development Programme suspended Sharapova from her role as a goodwill ambassador on March 16, while expressing thanks for her support of their work over the previous nine years.

On April 12, WADA intimated that athletes who tested positive for meldonium before March 1 could avoid bans, but the International Tennis Federation said that Sharapova's case would proceed. On June 8, the ITF announced that Sharapova would be suspended for two years. Sharapova indicated she would appeal the ban.

Following a hearing on September 7 and 8, 2016, the Court of Arbitration for Sport (CAS) panel found that Sharapova had a reduced perception of the risk that she took while using Mildronate, because (a) she had used Mildronate for around ten years without any anti-doping issue, (b) she did not mask or hide her use of mildronate and was open about it to many in her entourage (c) she had consulted the Russian doctor who prescribed the Mildronate for medical reasons, not to enhance her performance, and (d) she had received no specific warning about the change in status of meldonium from WADA, the ITF, or the WTA. However, the CAS panel also noted Sharapova's failure to disclose her use of meldonium on her doping control forms and that she was at fault for (a) failing to give her agent adequate instructions as to how to carry out the important task of checking the Prohibited List, and (b) failing to supervise and control the actions of her agent in carrying out that task (specifically the lack of any procedure for reporting or follow-up verification to make sure that her agent had actually discharged his duty).

Finally, the panel wishes to point out that the case it heard, and the award it renders, is not about an athlete who cheated. It was only about the degree of fault that can be imputed to a player for a player to make sure that a substance contained in a product she had been legally taking over a long period, and for most of the time on the basis of a doctor's prescription, remained in compliance with TADP and WADC. No question of the intent to violate the TADP and WADC was before this panel: under no circumstances therefore, can the Player be considered to be an "intentional doper".

On October 4, the CAS reduced the sanction imposed on Sharapova by an Independent Tribunal from 24 months to 15 months. CAS released a statement on its official website stating:

Ms. Sharapova committed an anti-doping rule violation and that while it was with "no significant fault", she bore some degree of fault, for which a sanction of 15 months is appropriate.

== Fed Cup participation ==
Sharapova has lived in the United States since moving there at the age of seven, but retains her Russian citizenship, and is therefore eligible to play in the Fed Cup for Russia. However, the behavior of Sharapova's father during her matches on the WTA Tour, combined with a perceived lack of commitment by her to the Fed Cup, made her selection for the Russian Fed Cup team controversial in the past.

After Sharapova had beaten fellow Russian Anastasia Myskina at the 2004 WTA Tour Championships, Myskina criticized Sharapova's father, saying: "He was just yelling and screaming instructions to her and I thought he just might jump right on the court at one point in the match." At the Fed Cup semifinals two weeks later, Myskina stated she would stop playing for Russia if Sharapova joined the Russian team the following season: "If she joins our team next season you won't see me there for sure. His behaviour is totally incorrect, simply rude. I don't want to be around people like him." Larisa Neiland, assistant to Russia Fed Cup captain Shamil Tarpishchev, added: "Her father's behaviour (at the WTA Tour Championships) was simply outrageous. I just don't see how he could work with the rest of us." However, Tarpishchev himself played down the problem, insisting: "I feel that things will calm down soon and we'll have Myskina, Sharapova, Kuznetsova and everyone else playing for Russia."

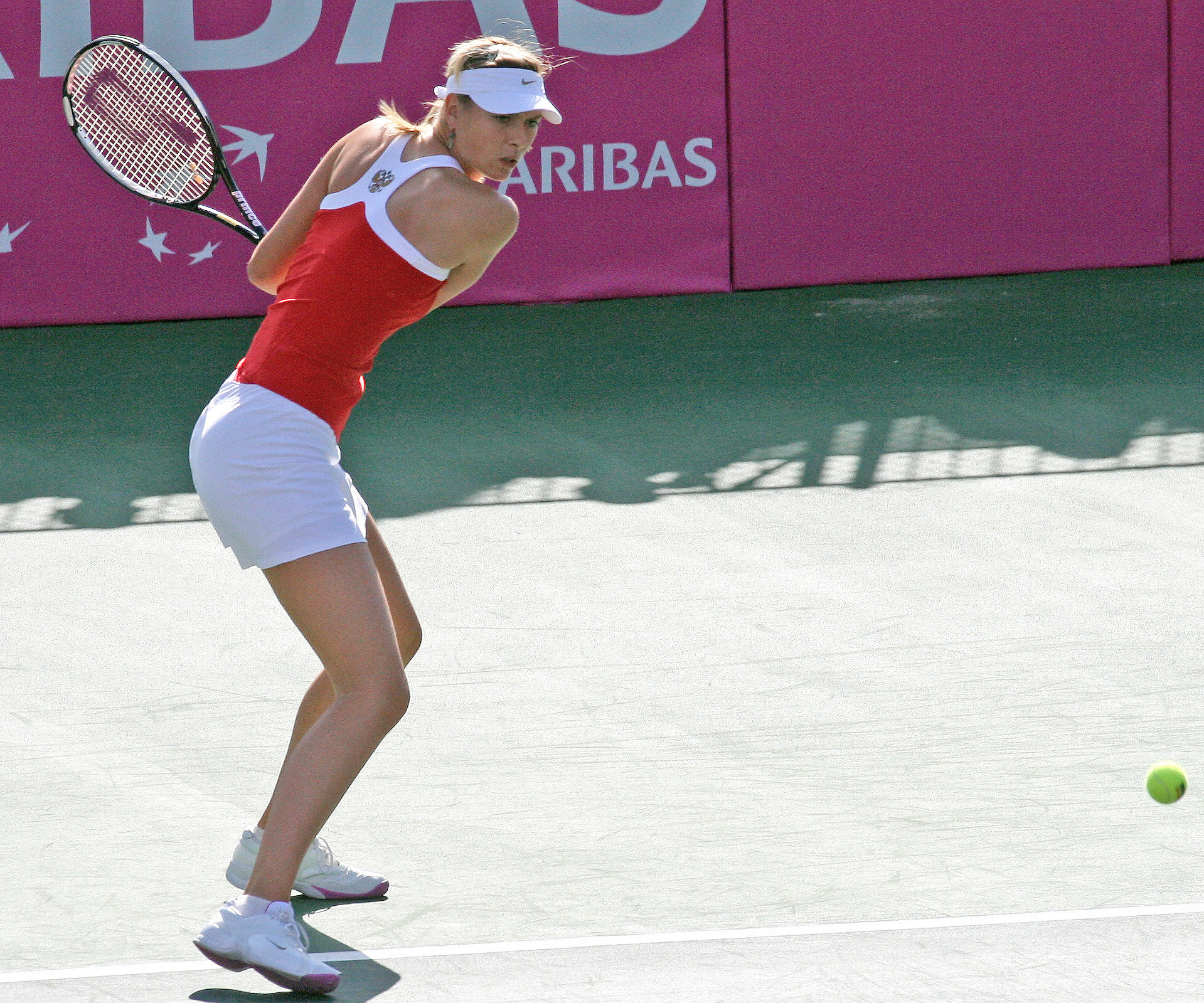
Sharapova at her Fed Cup debut in February 2008

At the end of 2005, Sharapova stated she was now keen to make her Fed Cup debut and was set to play against Belgium in April 2006, but withdrew. She later withdrew from ties against Spain in April 2007 and against the United States in July 2007 because of injuries. The latter withdrawal led to Russia's captain saying she would be "ineligible for selection" for the Fed Cup final in September. However, Sharapova attended the final, cheering from the sidelines and acting as a "hitting partner" in practices, resulting in some of her Russian teammates implying that she was attending only to enable her to play at the 2008 Beijing Olympics (rules state that players must have "shown commitment" to Fed Cup in order to play). Svetlana Kuznetsova said, "She said she wanted to be our practice partner but if you can't play how then can you practice?"

Sharapova finally made her Fed Cup debut in February 2008, in Russia's quarterfinal tie against Israel. She won both her singles rubbers, against Tzipora Obziler and Shahar Pe'er, helping Russia to a 4–1 victory. For the semifinals, she was given permission to skip the tie, with Tarpishchev announcing that she will be on the team for the final. However, the date of the final coincided with the lay-off from her shoulder injury, and thus she did not play.

In the 2011 first-round tie, Sharapova played Virginie Razzano of France and lost. Sharapova was supposed to play Alizé Cornet but she was suffering from a viral illness. Teammate Anastasia Pavlyuchenkova played and defeated Cornet to secure the 3–2 win for Russia against France. Sharapova continued to participate in 2012 and helped Russia to a 3–2 win against Spain in the first-round tie. Sharapova defeated Sílvia Soler Espinosa in the first rubber, but was unable to play her second rubber due to illness. In 2015, Sharapova helped Russia earn a place in the semifinals after beating Pole Urszula Radwańska in the first tie and her sister Agnieszka Radwańska in the second tie. Sharapova was scheduled to play the semifinal against Germany, however, she withdrew days before the competition. She then joined the team for the final against Czech Republic and won both of her matches, against Petra Kvitová and Karolína Plíšková. Despite the 2 wins by Sharapova, Russia still lost 3–2 after losing the decisive doubles rubber.

== Playing style ==
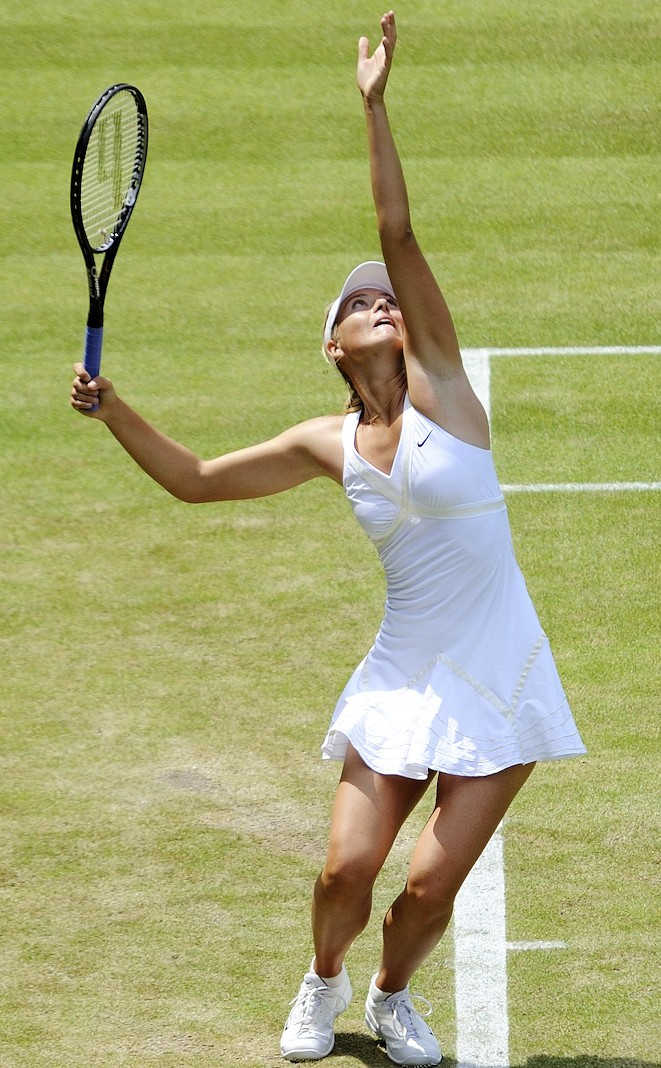
Sharapova serving at the Wimbledon Championships in 2009

Sharapova was an aggressive baseliner, whose game was centered on her powerful serve and groundstrokes. She hit her shots with relentless speed, power, and depth, and could generate sharp, acute angles with both her forehand and backhand. Her aggressive, high-risk playing style meant that she typically generated high numbers of both winners and unforced errors. Sharapova's greatest weapon was her backhand, which was described upon her retirement as "among the best in tennis". Her crosscourt backhand was her greatest shot, although she was also adept at hitting her backhand down-the-line, and was able to hit winners with her backhand from any position on the court. Her forehand was also strong, capable of dominating opponents with her flat and powerful shots. She was one of the few players on the WTA Tour who often used the reverse forehand—also known as the 'buggy whip' forehand—a technique that allowed her to hit winners from defensive positions which excelled on fast grass, hard, and carpet courts. It has been speculated, however, that her reliance on this shot may have contributed to her worsening shoulder injury.

From 2010 onwards, when she returned after shoulder surgery, Sharapova began to hit her forehand with a more conventional swing, with increased amounts of topspin. This alteration allowed her to excel on clay courts, but affected her game on faster hard and grass courts. Later in her career, Sharapova added both a drop shot and a sliced backhand to her repertoire, making for a more unpredictable playing style. Whilst her drop shot was highly telegraphed, her exceptional execution allowed her to end points, or induce unforced errors from opponents. Sharapova was thought to have good speed around the court, especially considering her height, although her footwork, speed, and court coverage were always considered the major weaknesses in her game. These improved throughout her career, allowing her to execute a more defensive playing style effectively, counterpunching until she could create the opportunity to hit a winner.

Throughout her career, Sharapova's greatest asset was considered to be her mental toughness and competitive spirit, with Nick Bollettieri stating that she is "tough as nails"; Bollettieri later described her mental strength as "unbelieveable". Hall-of-famer John McEnroe said of Sharapova, "she's one of the best competitors in the history of the sport." Upon her retirement, she was described as "the ultimate competitor", who was set apart from her peers by her mental strength, and was lauded as an "unyielding character". American player Christina McHale described playing Sharapova as "intimidating" due to her mental fortitude, competitive spirit, and composure under pressure. Sharapova was known for on-court "grunting", which reached a recorded 101 decibels during a match at Wimbledon in 2005; Sharapova described her grunting as "a natural instinct." When questioned by the media about her grunting, Sharapova urged the media to "just watch the match."

=== Serve ===
Early in her career, Sharapova's first and second serves were regarded as powerful, and she was believed to possess one of the best deliveries on the WTA Tour. Since the beginning of 2007, however, problems with her shoulder reduced the effectiveness of her serve. Her shoulder injury resulted in not only inconsistent first serves, but also led to Sharapova hitting high numbers of double faults. Two-time US Open singles champion Tracy Austin stated that Sharapova often lost confidence in the rest of her game when she experienced problems with her serve, and consequently produced more unforced errors and generally played more tentatively, whilst tennis writer Joel Drucker remarked that her serve was the "catalyst for her entire game", and that her struggles with it left her "unmasked." In her return from an injury layoff in 2008 to 2009, she used an abbreviated motion, which, whilst producing aces, was somewhat less powerful, and also gave a very high number of double faults. From 2010, Sharapova returned to a more elongated motion, similar to her pre-surgery serve. She was able to produce speeds greater than before, including a 121 mph (195 km/h) serve hit at the Birmingham tournament in 2010—the fastest serve of her career. Continuing shoulder injuries affected her serve, and, by the end of her career, her serve was a major liability, with Sharapova serving many double faults per match.

=== Net play ===
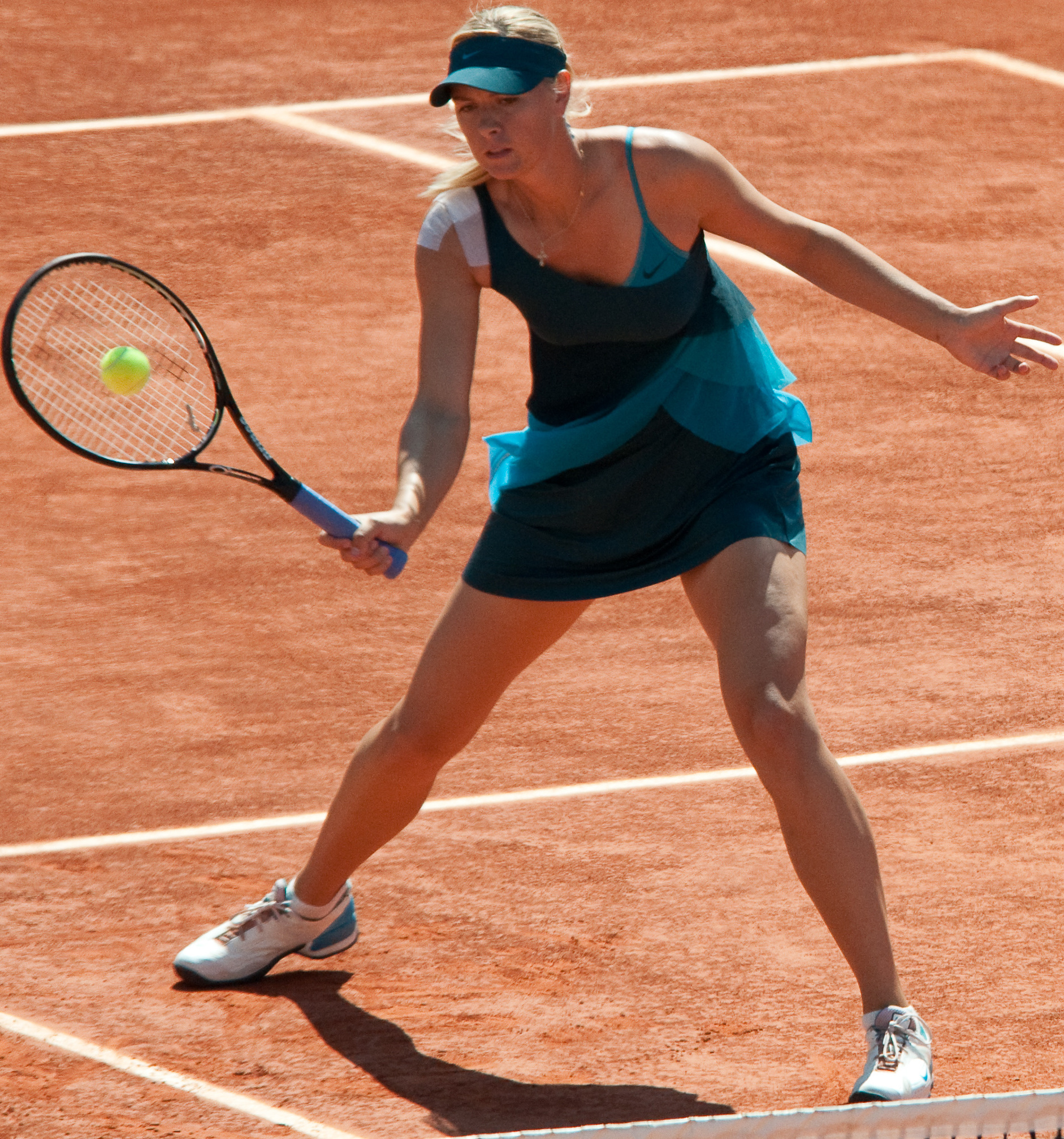
Sharapova volleying at the net

Instead of using a traditional volley or overhead smash, Sharapova preferred to hit powerful "swinging" volleys when approaching the net or attacking lobs. In her final years, Sharapova began to attack the net more, and showed improved feel when volleying, being able to hit delicate volleys with increased regularity. This tactic was considered by some to compensate for her decreased power at the baseline as a result of her shoulder injury.

=== Surfaces ===
Because she predicated her game on power and aggression, Sharapova's preferred surfaces early in her career were fast hard, grass, and carpet courts. Sharapova initially was not as well-suited to slower clay courts, admitting in 2007 that she was not as comfortable with her movement on clay compared with other court surfaces and once described herself as like a "cow on ice" on clay due to her inability to slide. As her career developed, she began to improve on the surface, winning her first red clay title at the 2009 Internationaux de Strasbourg, with her clay-court prowess culminating to two Roland-Garros titles. In 2014, she led the WTA Tour with the highest winning percentage on clay among active players, with an 84.25% winning rate.

== Coaches ==
Sharapova had multiple coaches throughout her career. Besides her father Yuri, this included Robert Lansdorp, Michael Joyce in 2004–11, Jimmy Connors in 2013, Sven Groeneveld in 2013–18, Thomas Högstedt in 2010–13, 2018–19, and Riccardo Piatti in 2019–20.

== Career statistics ==
=== Grand Slam tournament performance timeline ===
Key
W	F	SF	QF	#R	RR	Q#	DNQ	A	NH

(W) winner; (F) finalist; (SF) semifinalist; (QF) quarterfinalist; (#R) rounds 4, 3, 2, 1; (RR) round-robin stage; (Q#) qualification round; (DNQ) did not qualify; (A) absent; (NH) not held; (SR) strike rate (events won / competed); (W–L) win–loss record.

Tournament	2003	2004	2005	2006	2007	2008	2009	2010	2011	2012	2013	2014	2015	2016	2017	2018	2019	2020	SR	W–L	Win %
Australian Open	1R	3R	SF	SF	F	W	A	1R	4R	F	SF	4R	F	QF	A	3R	4R	1R	1 / 16	57–15	79%
French Open	1R	QF	QF	4R	SF	4R	QF	3R	SF	W	F	W	4R	A	A	QF	A	A	2 / 14	56–12	82%
Wimbledon	4R	W	SF	SF	4R	2R	2R	4R	F	4R	2R	4R	SF	A	A	1R	1R	NH	1 / 15	46–14	77%
US Open	2R	3R	SF	W	3R	A	3R	4R	3R	SF	A	4R	A	A	4R	4R	1R	A	1 / 13	38–12	76%
Win–loss	4–4	15–3	19–4	20–3	16–4	11–2	7–3	8–4	16–4	21–3	12–3	16–3	14–3	4–1	3–1	8–4	3–3	0–1	5 / 58	197–53	79%

==== Singles finals: 10 (5 titles, 5 runner-ups) ====
Result	Year	Championship	Surface	Opponent	Score
Win	2004	Wimbledon	Grass	(United States) Serena Williams	6–1, 6–4
Win	2006	US Open	Hard	(Belgium) Justine Henin	6–4, 6–4
Loss	2007	Australian Open	Hard	(United States) Serena Williams	1–6, 2–6
Win	2008	Australian Open	Hard	(Serbia) Ana Ivanovic	7–5, 6–3
Loss	2011	Wimbledon	Grass	(Czech Republic) Petra Kvitová	3–6, 4–6
Loss	2012	Australian Open	Hard	(Belarus) Victoria Azarenka	3–6, 0–6
Win	2012	French Open	Clay	(Italy) Sara Errani	6–3, 6–2
Loss	2013	French Open	Clay	(United States) Serena Williams	4–6, 4–6
Win	2014	French Open (2)	Clay	(Romania) Simona Halep	6–4, 6–7^{(5–7)}, 6–4
Loss	2015	Australian Open	Hard	(United States) Serena Williams	3–6, 6–7^{(5–7)}

=== WTA Tour Championships ===
Finals: 3 (1 title, 2 runner-ups)

Result	Year	Championship	Surface	Opponent	Score
Win	2004	WTA Finals, Los Angeles	Hard	(United States) Serena Williams	4–6, 6–2, 6–4
Loss	2007	WTA Finals, Madrid	Hard	(Belgium) Justine Henin	7–5, 5–7, 3–6
Loss	2012	WTA Finals, Istanbul	Hard	(United States) Serena Williams	4–6, 3–6

== Awards ==
2003

- Russian Cup Newcomer of the Year
- Women's Tennis Association (WTA) Newcomer of the Year

2004

- WTA Player of the Year
- WTA Most Improved Player of the Year

2005

- ESPY Best Female Tennis Player
- Prix de Citron Roland Garros
- Russian Cup Female Tennis Player of the Year

2006

- Russian Cup Female Tennis Player of the Year
- Whirlpool 6th Sense Player of the Year

2007

- ESPY Best Female Tennis Player
- ESPY Best International Female Athlete

2008

- ESPY Best Female Tennis Player
- Russian Cup Team of the Year (as part of the Fed Cup team)

2010

- WTA Fan Favorite Singles Player
- WTA Humanitarian of the Year
- WTA Most Fashionable Player (On Court)
- WTA Most Fashionable Player (Off Court)
- WTA Most Dramatic Expression

2012

- ESPY Best Female Tennis Player
- Medal of the Order For Merit to the Fatherland 2nd Class (April 28, 2012) – for her philanthropic activity
- Medal of the Order For Merit to the Fatherland 1st Class (August 13, 2012) – for her outstanding contribution to the development of physical cultures and sports at the XXX Olympic Games in 2012 in London (Great Britain)
- Russian Cup Female Tennis Player of the Year

2016

- Order For Merit to the Fatherland (February 5, 2016)

== Personal life ==
=== Relationships ===
In 2011, Sharapova was engaged to Slovenian professional basketball player Sasha Vujačić, with whom she had been in a relationship since 2009. On August 31, 2012, Sharapova confirmed that the pair had ended the engagement and separated earlier that year. Between 2012 and 2015, Sharapova dated Bulgarian tennis player Grigor Dimitrov.

Since 2018, Sharapova has been in a relationship with English businessman Alexander Gilkes. In December 2020, Sharapova and Gilkes revealed they were engaged. On July 1, 2022, she gave birth to a son.

=== Public profile ===
Sharapova has lived in the United States since moving there at the age of seven. She has a home in Manhattan Beach, California and Bradenton, Florida. From 2005 to 2011, Sharapova was named to the Forbes Celebrity 100, which attempts to compile the top 100 most powerful celebrities of that year.

Sharapova has now taken up the sport of pickleball. In 2024, she played a doubles match partnering with John McEnroe in a loss to Andre Agassi and his wife Steffi Graf.

=== Politics ===
In early March 2022, Sharapova spoke out against the Russian invasion of Ukraine and pledged to donate to Save the Children organisation helping Ukrainian children affected by the war.

=== Citizenship ===
Although Sharapova has been living in the United States since 1994, she has preferred to keep her Russian citizenship:

It is about the family environment, it is about the rich culture. Just life experiences that I look back to and I know that for so many years I was shaped into the individual I was from those experiences. And not necessarily simply the country, but the people, the mentality and the toughness and that never-giving-up attitude.

=== Charity work ===
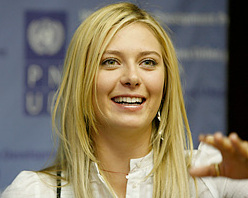
Sharapova as an UNDP Goodwill Ambassador in 2010

The Maria Sharapova Foundation is "committed to helping children around the world achieve their dreams". Sharapova has donated $100,000 to Chernobyl-related projects. With the United Nations Development Programme (UNDP), she launched a $210,000 scholarship program for students from Chernobyl-affected areas of Belarus that will award five-year scholarships to 12 students at the Belarusian State Academy of Arts and the Belarusian State University. At the 2004 US Open, Sharapova and several other Russian female tennis players wore black ribbons in observance of the Beslan school hostage crisis, which took place days before. In 2005, she donated around US$50,000 to those affected by the crisis.

On February 14, 2007, Sharapova was appointed a Goodwill Ambassador for the UNDP and donated US$210,000 to UNDP Chernobyl-recovery projects. She said at the time that she was planning to travel back to the area after Wimbledon in 2008, though it didn't happen since she had to travel back to the US because of her shoulder injury. She fulfilled the trip in late June/early July 2010. Sharapova helped to promote the 2014 Winter Olympics in Sochi, Russia, and was the first torch bearer in the torch-lighting ceremony during the opening festivities. In addition, Sharapova participated in an exhibition in Tampa in December 2004, raising money for the Florida Hurricane Relief Fund. In July 2008, Sharapova sent a message on DVD to the memorial service of Emily Bailes, who had performed the coin toss ahead of the 2004 Wimbledon final that Sharapova won.

=== Autobiography ===
Sharapova's autobiography, Unstoppable. My Life So Far was published on September 12, 2017, by Sarah Crichton Books.

== Endorsements ==
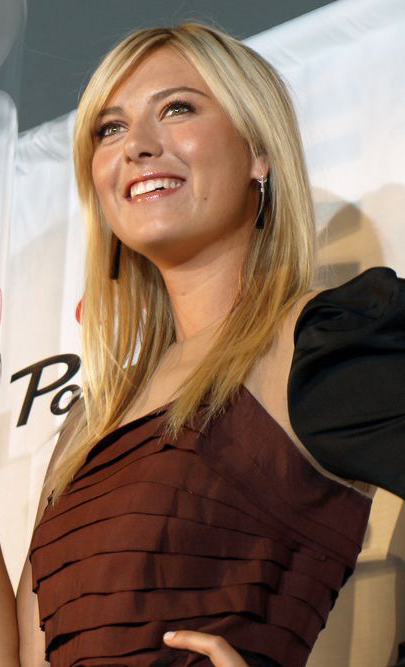
Sharapova at the unveiling of her Canon PowerShot Diamond lineup

Sharapova's tennis success and appearance have enabled her to secure commercial endorsements that greatly exceed the value of her tournament winnings. She has been represented by IMG agent Max Eisenbud since around 1999. In March 2006, Forbes magazine listed her as the highest-paid female athlete in the world, with annual earnings of over US$18 million, the majority of which was from endorsements and sponsorships. She topped that list every year until 2016, even after her 2007 shoulder injury. In 2011, Forbes listed Sharapova as No. 29 in their list of 50 top-paid athletes, the only woman on the list. In 2012, she was listed as No. 15, and was joined in the top 20 by Li Na at No. 16 and Serena Williams at No. 17.

In April 2005, People named her one of the 50 most beautiful celebrities in the world. In 2006, Maxim ranked Sharapova the hottest athlete in the world for the fourth consecutive year. She posed in a six-page bikini photoshoot spread in the 2006 Valentine's Day issue of the Sports Illustrated Swimsuit Issue, alongside 25 supermodels. In a poll run by Britain's FHM magazine, she was voted the seventh most eligible bachelorette, based on both "wealth and looks."

After her win at the 2004 Wimbledon Championship, mobile phone company Motorola signed Sharapova to endorse their mobile phones. She appeared in commercials for Land Rover and Canon, as well as approved of namesake items by watch brand Tag Heuer and jeweller Tiffany. Tiffany provides Sharapova with earrings from the "Tiffany for Maria Sharapova" collection at the four major events, that are also retailed globally. She starred in an award-winning campaign for the sports clothing brand Nike, "Pretty", in the summer of 2006. She signed a sponsorship deal in January 2007 with Gatorade and Tropicana, which ended in 2009. In 2007, Sharapova was featured in Canon USA commercials for the PowerShot. Sharapova has been depicted in many tennis-related video games, including the Top Spin series, Virtua Tennis series, and Grand Slam Tennis series. During the layoff due to her shoulder surgery, Sharapova decided to focus on developing her name as a brand, beginning with meeting with her sponsors more extensively to further her brand. In January 2010, it was announced that Sharapova had renewed her contract with Nike, signing an 8-year deal for $70 million—the most lucrative deal ever for a sportswoman.

Sharapova launched her own tennis apparel line, the Nike Maria Sharapova Collection, in 2010. The collection includes dresses that she designed for all the major tournaments, in collaboration with Nike and Cole Haan. She comes up with design ideas and sketches in a process that begins 18 months before the event and receives royalties from the sale of the collection, of which the corresponding dresses are coordinated to be available simultaneously with the corresponding major tournament. Sharapova had earlier collaborated with Nike on the little black dress that she wore for her night matches at the 2006 US Open. The dress featured a round crystal-studded collar and was inspired by Audrey Hepburn. The dress was well publicized and received but was not mass-produced. Additionally, she designs shoes and handbags for Cole Haan, for which her signature ballerina flats are one of the biggest sellers of the entire brand.

Sharapova used the Prince Triple Threat Hornet for part of 2003 and then used several different Prince racquets. She started the 2004 season with the Prince More Attack 920, which she used to win the 2004 Wimbledon Championships. She gave the racquet to Regis Philbin when taping Live with Regis and Kelly, and began using the Prince Turbo Shark MP specially designed for her at the 2004 US Open until 2005. She then switched to the Prince O3 White racquet in January 2006 which helped her capture her second major at the 2006 US Open. She briefly used the Prince O3 Speedport White at the 2007 Kremlin Cup, but ultimately switched back to the O3 White, winning her third major at the 2008 Australian Open. She then switched to the Prince O3 Speedport Black in July 2008 after returning to the tour from shoulder surgery, then switched to the Prince EXO3 Black 100 in 2010. After being with Prince for ten years, Sharapova began endorsing Head racquets in 2011 and used their Instinct line, winning the French Open in 2012 and 2014 until she retired in 2020.

Sharapova signed a three-year deal to be brand ambassador for Porsche in 2013.

== Business ventures ==
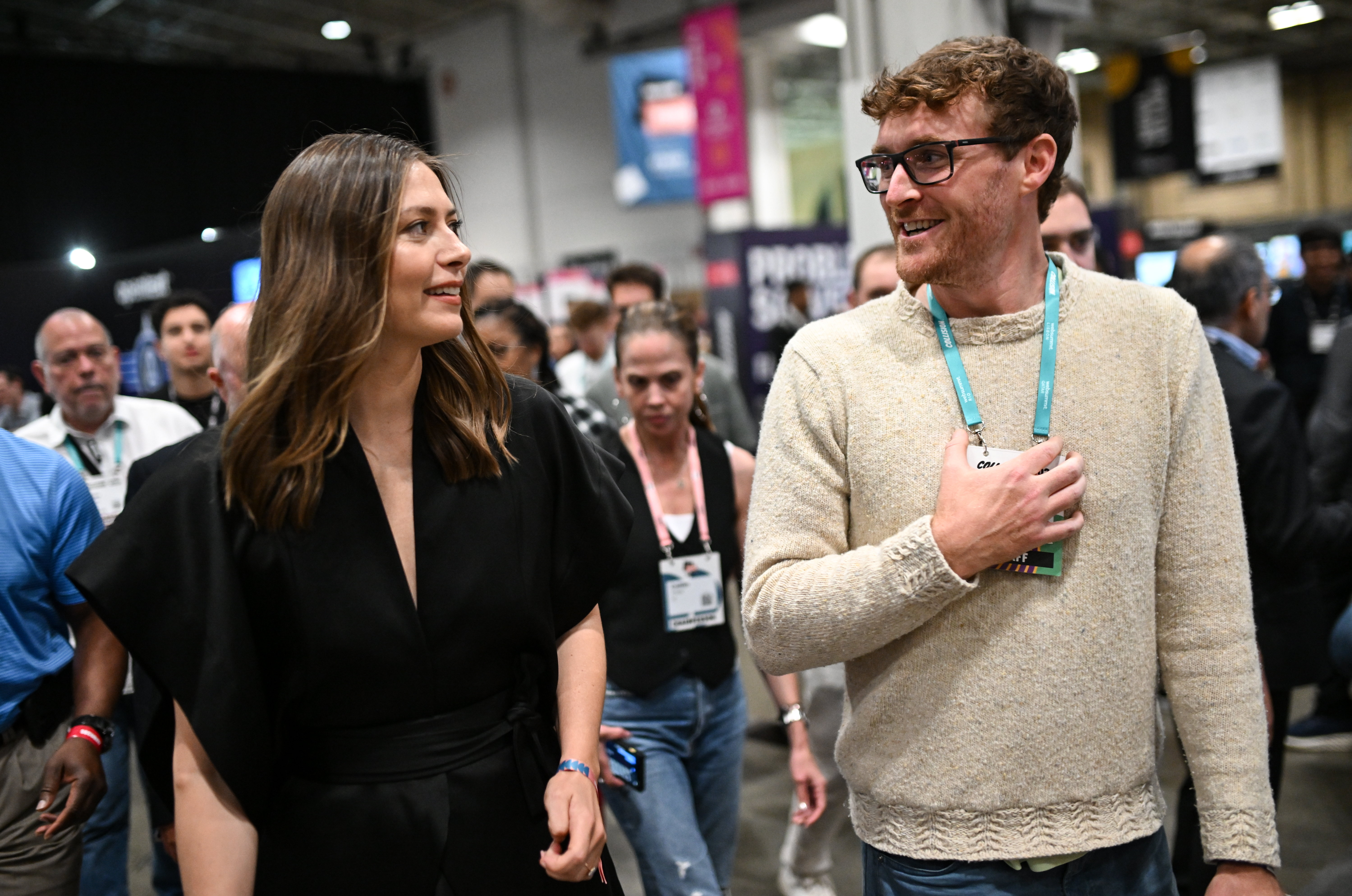
Sharapova with Paddy Cosgrave at Collision 2024 in Toronto

Sharapova launched her confectionery brand Sugarpova in 2012. Sugarpova had a reported sales of $20 million in the year 2019. In 2014, Sharapova invested in sunscreen brand Supergoop. It was reported in 2021 that Blackstone had bought a majority stake in Supergoop. Sharapova also appeared as a guest shark in the American TV show Shark Tank in 2020, where she teamed up with Mark Cuban to invest in wearable wrist and ankle weights company Bala Bangles. Later in 2020, Sharapova became an investor in wellness brand Therabody. Some other companies Sharapova has invested in include UFC, Tonal, Public.com, Moonpay, Clio Snacks. In April 2022, Sharapova also became a member of the Board of Directors of the fashion brand Moncler. Sharapova acts as an advisor to brands Naked Retail and Bright.

== Filmography ==
Film and television
Year	Title	Role	Notes
2016	Chelsea	Herself	Episode: "Mission to Moscow"
2017	Maria Sharapova: The Point	Herself	Documentary
2018, 2020	Billions	Herself	2 Episodes
2018	Ocean's 8	Herself	Cameo appearance
2019	The Morning Show	Herself	Episode: "Play the Queen"
2020	Shark Tank	Herself	Guest Shark, Episode #11.13

== See also ==
- ATP World Tour records
- WTA Tour records
- List of WTA number 1 ranked singles tennis players
- List of female tennis players
- List of tennis rivalries
- Tennis records of the Open Era – Women's singles

Sporting positions
Preceded by Lindsay Davenport; Lindsay Davenport; Justine Henin; Justine Henin; Victoria Azarenka	World No. 1 August 22, 2005 – August 28, 2005; September 12, 2005 – October 23, 2005; January 29, 2007 – March 18, 2007; May 19, 2008 – June 8, 2008; June 11, 2012 – July 8, 2012	Succeeded by Lindsay Davenport; Lindsay Davenport; Justine Henin; Ana Ivanovic; Victoria Azarenka
Preceded by Ana Ivanovic	US Open Series Champion; 2007	Succeeded by Dinara Safina
Awards
Preceded by Svetlana Kuznetsova	WTA Newcomer of the Year; 2003	Succeeded by Tatiana Golovin
Preceded by Nadia Petrova	WTA Most Improved Player; 2004	Succeeded by Ana Ivanovic
Preceded by Justine Henin	WTA Player of the Year; 2004	Succeeded by Kim Clijsters
Preceded by Serena Williams; Venus Williams; Serena Williams; Serena Williams	ESPY Best Female Tennis Player; 2005; 2007–2008; 2012; 2014	Succeeded by Venus Williams; Serena Williams; Serena Williams; Serena Williams
Preceded by N/A	ESPY Best International Female Athlete; 2007	Succeeded by Lorena Ochoa
Preceded by Elena Dementieva	WTA Fan Favorite Singles Player of the Year; 2010	Succeeded by Agnieszka Radwańska
Preceded by Ana Ivanovic	WTA Humanitarian of the Year; 2010	Incumbent
Olympic Games
Preceded by Andrei Kirilenko	Flagbearer for Russia; London 2012	Succeeded by Sergey Tetyukhin
