= 2012 WTA Tour =

Women's tennis circuit

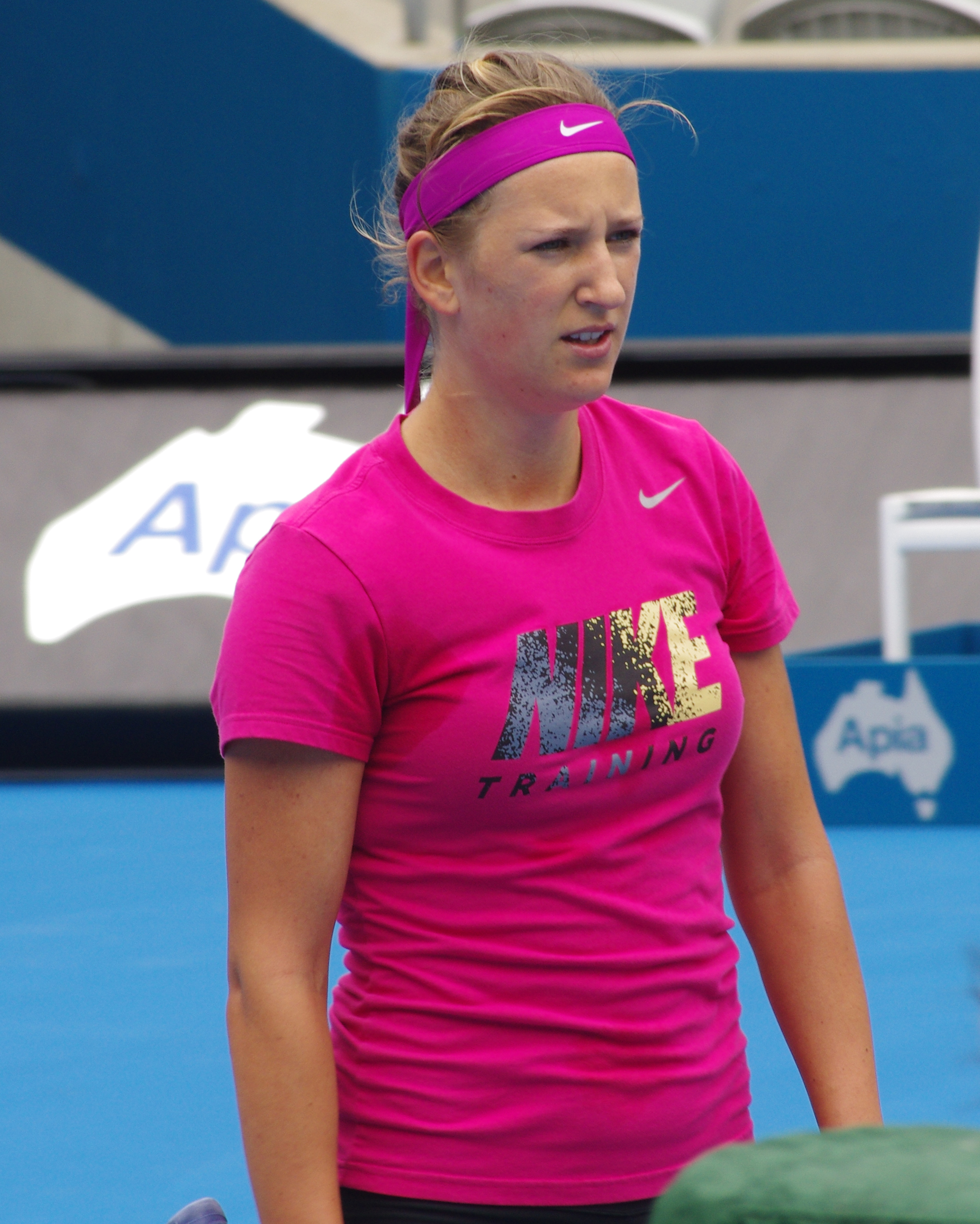
- Victoria Azarenka finished the year as WTA world No. 1 for the first time in her career, though Serena Williams was named the Player of the Year. Azarenka won six singles tournaments during the season, including a major at the Australian Open. She also won three Premier Mandatory and Premier 5 events, finished runner-up at another major at the US Open, and won a bronze medal in singles at the London Olympics. Williams won seven singles tournaments during the season, including two majors at the Wimbledon Championships and the US Open, the gold medal in singles at the London Olympics, the WTA Tour Championships, and a Premier Mandatory event.

Details
- Duration: December 31, 2011 – November 4, 2012
- Edition: 42nd
- Tournaments: 57
- Categories: Grand Slam (4); WTA Championships (2); Summer Olympics; WTA Premier Mandatory (4); WTA Premier 5 (5); WTA Premier (12); WTA International (29)

Achievements (singles)
- Most titles: (United States) Serena Williams (7)
- Most finals: (Belarus) Victoria Azarenka (Russia) Maria Sharapova (9)
- Prize money leader: (Belarus) Victoria Azarenka (US$7,928,920)
- Points leader: (Belarus) Victoria Azarenka (10,595)

Awards
- Player of the year: (United States) Serena Williams
- Doubles team of the year: (Italy) Sara Errani; (Italy) Roberta Vinci
- Most improved player of the year: (Italy) Sara Errani
- Newcomer of the year: (United Kingdom) Laura Robson
- Comeback player of the year: (Kazakhstan) Yaroslava Shvedova

The 2012 WTA Tour is the elite professional tennis circuit organized by the Women's Tennis Association (WTA) for the 2012 tennis season. The 2012 WTA Tour calendar comprises the Grand Slam tournaments (supervised by the International Tennis Federation (ITF)), the WTA Premier tournaments (Premier Mandatory, Premier 5, and regular Premier), the WTA International tournaments, the Fed Cup (organized by the ITF), the year-end championships (the WTA Tour Championships and the WTA Tournament of Champions), and the tennis event at the Summer Olympic Games. Also included in the 2012 calendar is the Hopman Cup, which is organized by the ITF and does not distribute ranking points.

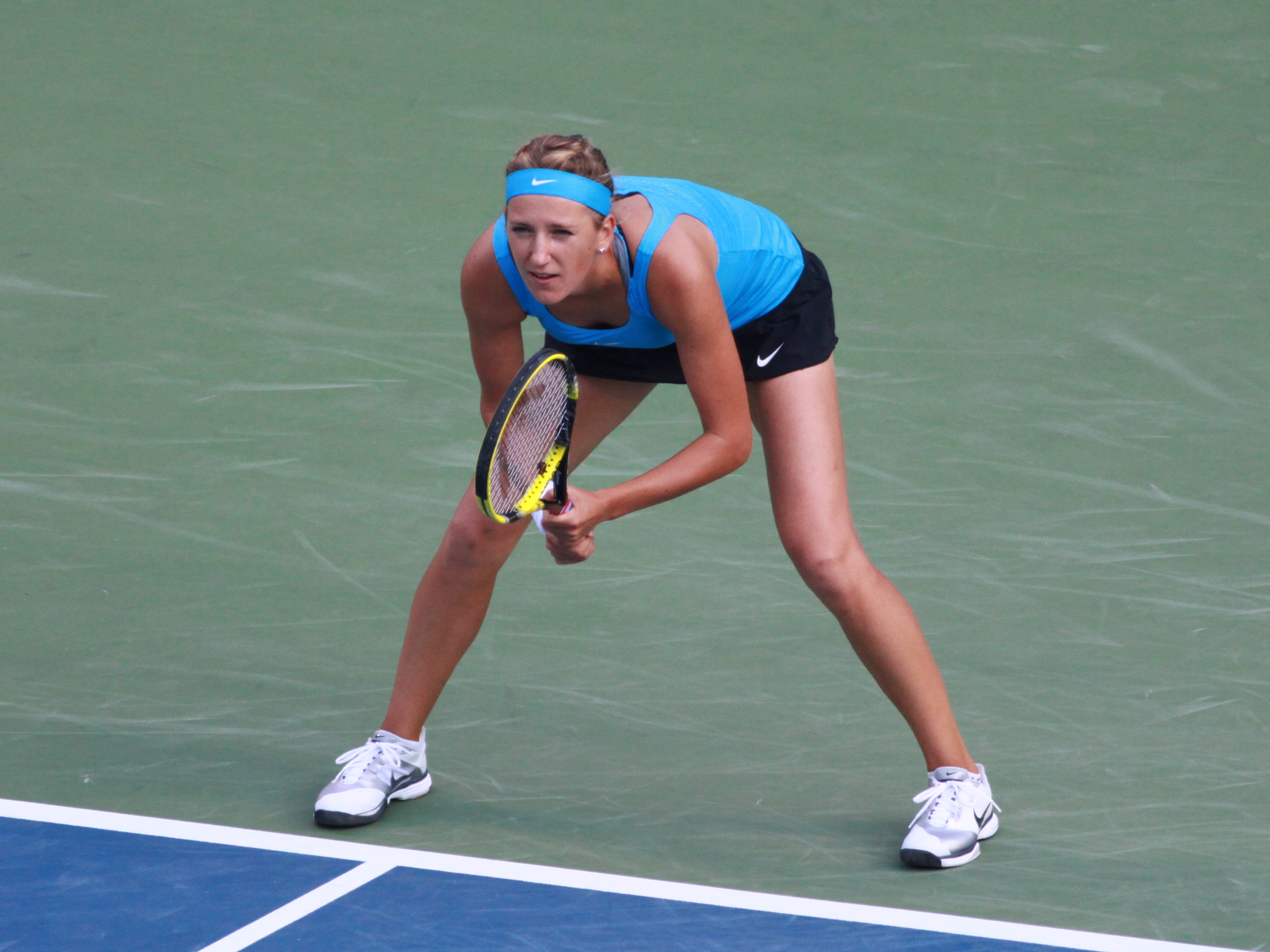
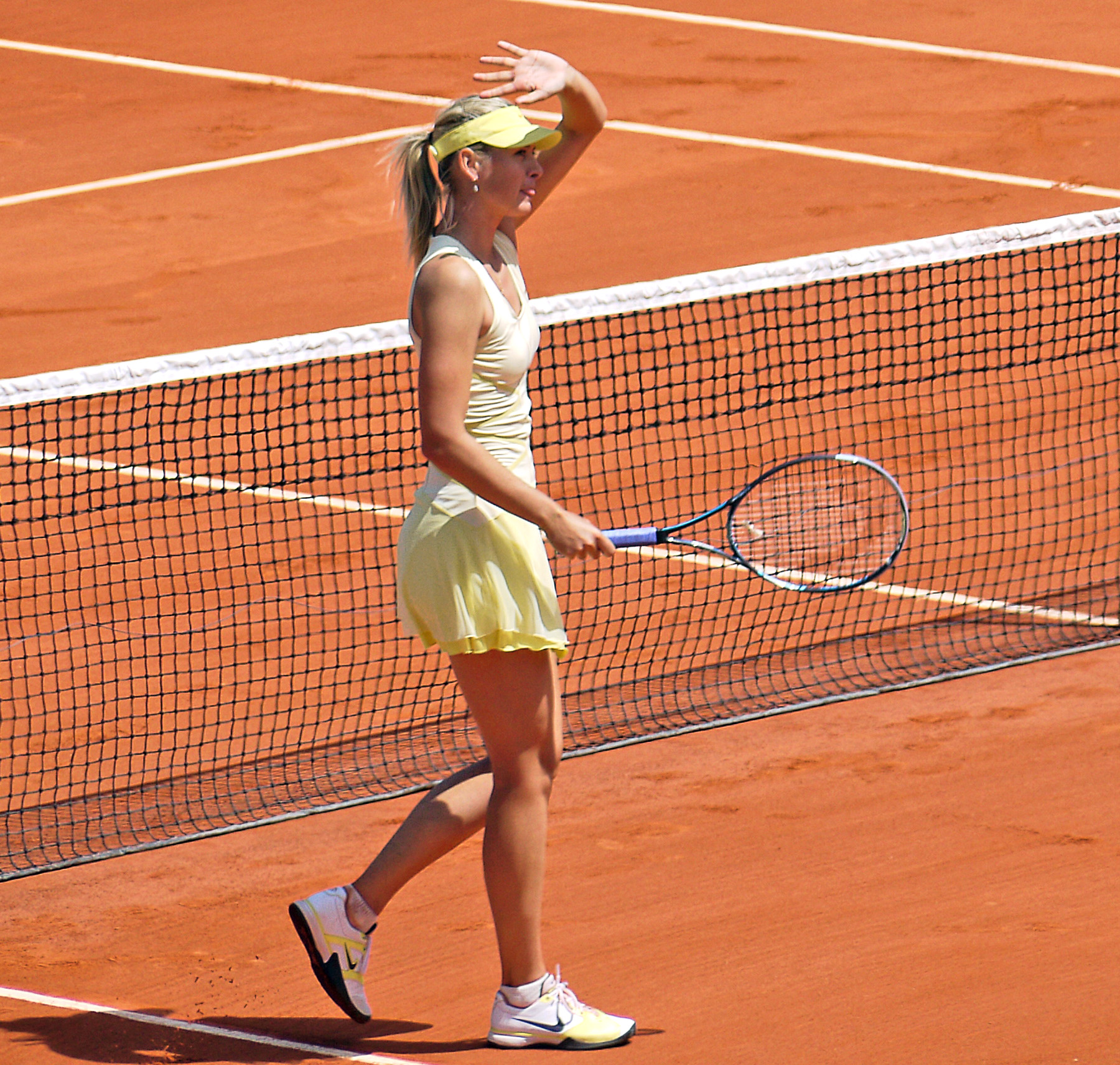
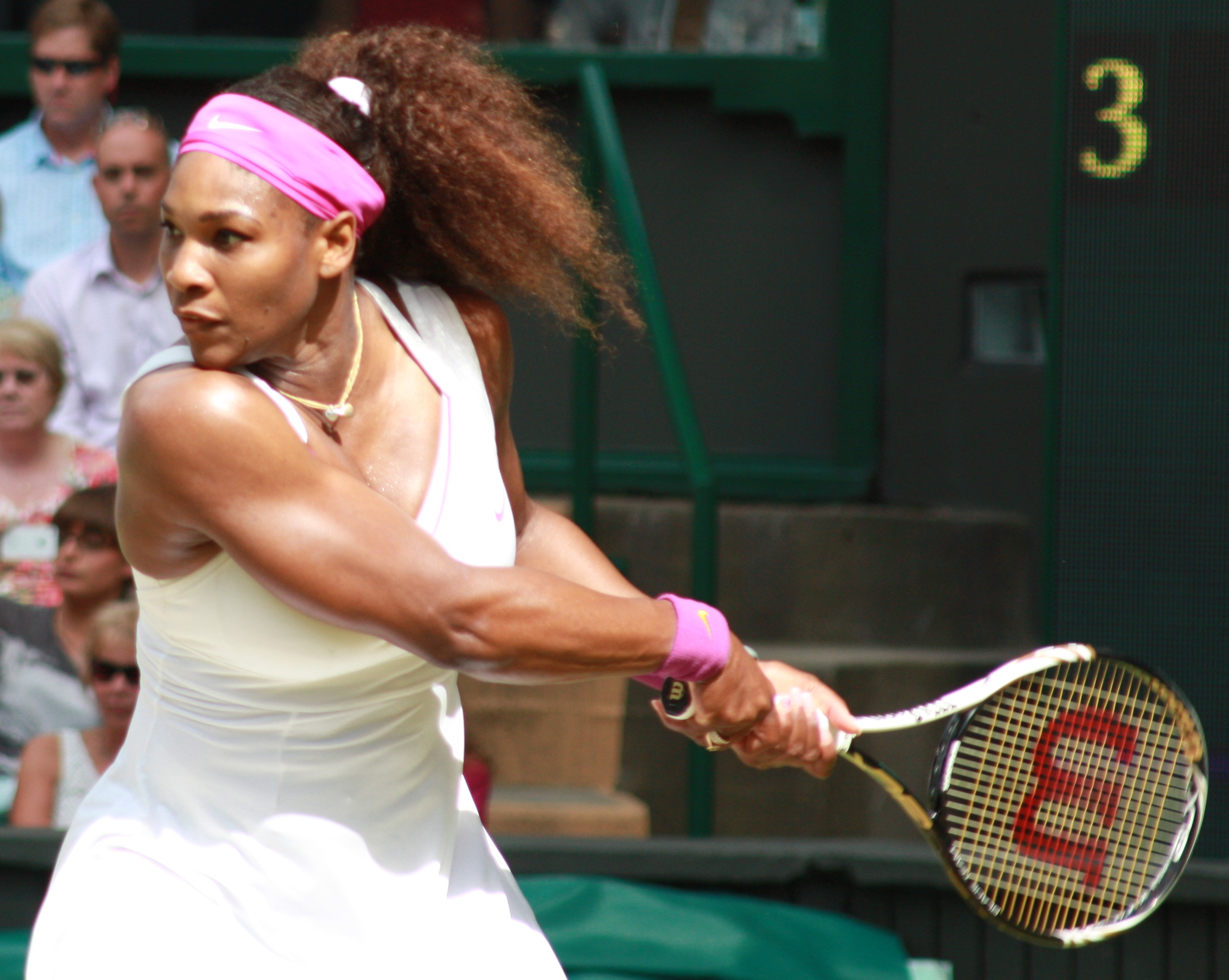
Victoria Azarenka (left) became the first Belarusian to win a singles major title at the Australian Open, defeating Maria Sharapova in the final to also become the new world No. 1. Sharapova (middle) rebounded at the French Open, winning her fourth major and completing the career Grand Slam by defeating Sara Errani in the final. At Wimbledon and the US Open, Serena Williams (right) won her 14th and 15th major titles by beating Agnieszka Radwańska and Azarenka, respectively, in the finals for her fifth Wimbledon and fourth US Open triumphs. And at the London Olympics, Serena Williams won the gold medal by defeating Sharapova in the final, becoming the second woman to complete the career Golden Slam in singles.

== Schedule ==
This is the complete schedule of events on the 2012 calendar, with player progression documented from the quarterfinals stage.

Key

Grand Slam tournaments
Summer Olympic Games
Year-end championships
WTA Premier Mandatory
WTA Premier 5
WTA Premier
WTA International
Team events

=== January ===
Week	Tournament	Champions	Runners-up	Semifinalists	Quarterfinalists
2 Jan	Hyundai Hopman Cup; Perth, Australia; ITF Mixed Teams Championships; Hard (i) – $1,000,000 – 8 teams (RR)	Czech Republic; 2–0	France	Round robin (Group A) Bulgaria; Denmark; United States	Round robin (Group B) Spain; Australia; China
2 Jan	Brisbane International; Brisbane, Australia; WTA Premier; Hard – $655,000 – 32S/16D; Singles – Doubles	(Estonia) Kaia Kanepi; 6–2, 6–1	(Slovakia) Daniela Hantuchová	(Belgium) Kim Clijsters (Italy) Francesca Schiavone	(Czech Republic) Iveta Benešová (United States) Serena Williams (Serbia) Jelena Janković (Germany) Andrea Petkovic
2 Jan	Brisbane International; Brisbane, Australia; WTA Premier; Hard – $655,000 – 32S/16D; Singles – Doubles	(Spain) Nuria Llagostera Vives; (Spain) Arantxa Parra Santonja; 7–6^{(7–2)}, 7–6^{(7–2)}	(United States) Raquel Kops-Jones; (United States) Abigail Spears	(Belgium) Kim Clijsters (Italy) Francesca Schiavone	(Czech Republic) Iveta Benešová (United States) Serena Williams (Serbia) Jelena Janković (Germany) Andrea Petkovic
2 Jan	ASB Classic; Auckland, New Zealand; WTA International; Hard – $220,000 – 32S/16D; Singles – Doubles	(China) Zheng Jie; 2–6, 6–3, 2–0 retired^{[a]}	(Italy) Flavia Pennetta	(Germany) Angelique Kerber (Russia) Svetlana Kuznetsova	(Germany) Sabine Lisicki (Russia) Elena Vesnina (Italy) Sara Errani (Czech Republic) Lucie Hradecká
2 Jan	ASB Classic; Auckland, New Zealand; WTA International; Hard – $220,000 – 32S/16D; Singles – Doubles	(Czech Republic) Andrea Hlaváčková; (Czech Republic) Lucie Hradecká; 6–7^{(2–7)}, 6–2, [10–7]	(Germany) Julia Görges; (Italy) Flavia Pennetta	(Germany) Angelique Kerber (Russia) Svetlana Kuznetsova	(Germany) Sabine Lisicki (Russia) Elena Vesnina (Italy) Sara Errani (Czech Republic) Lucie Hradecká
9 Jan	Apia International Sydney; Sydney, Australia; WTA Premier; Hard – $637,000 – 30S/16D; Singles – Doubles	(Belarus) Victoria Azarenka; 6–2, 1–6, 6–3	(China) Li Na	(Poland) Agnieszka Radwańska (Czech Republic) Petra Kvitová	(Denmark) Caroline Wozniacki (France) Marion Bartoli (Czech Republic) Lucie Šafářová (Slovakia) Daniela Hantuchová
9 Jan	Apia International Sydney; Sydney, Australia; WTA Premier; Hard – $637,000 – 30S/16D; Singles – Doubles	(Czech Republic) Květa Peschke (Slovenia) Katarina Srebotnik; 6–1, 4–6, [13–11]	(United States) Liezel Huber (United States) Lisa Raymond	(Poland) Agnieszka Radwańska (Czech Republic) Petra Kvitová	(Denmark) Caroline Wozniacki (France) Marion Bartoli (Czech Republic) Lucie Šafářová (Slovakia) Daniela Hantuchová
9 Jan	Moorilla Hobart International; Hobart, Australia; WTA International; Hard – $220,000 – 32S/16D; Singles – Doubles	(Germany) Mona Barthel; 6–1, 6–2	(Belgium) Yanina Wickmayer	(Israel) Shahar Pe'er (Germany) Angelique Kerber	(Romania) Simona Halep (Russia) Anna Chakvetadze (Romania) Sorana Cîrstea (Australia) Jarmila Gajdošová
9 Jan	Moorilla Hobart International; Hobart, Australia; WTA International; Hard – $220,000 – 32S/16D; Singles – Doubles	(Romania) Irina-Camelia Begu (Romania) Monica Niculescu; 6–7^{(4–7)}, 7–6^{(7–4)}, [10–5]	(Chinese Taipei) Chuang Chia-jung (New Zealand) Marina Erakovic	(Israel) Shahar Pe'er (Germany) Angelique Kerber	(Romania) Simona Halep (Russia) Anna Chakvetadze (Romania) Sorana Cîrstea (Australia) Jarmila Gajdošová
16 Jan; 23 Jan	Australian Open; Melbourne, Australia; Grand Slam $12,122,762 – hard 128S/96Q/64D/32X; Singles – Doubles – Mixed doubles	(Belarus) Victoria Azarenka; 6–3, 6–0	(Russia) Maria Sharapova	(Belgium) Kim Clijsters (Czech Republic) Petra Kvitová	(Denmark) Caroline Wozniacki (Poland) Agnieszka Radwańska (Russia) Ekaterina Makarova (Italy) Sara Errani
16 Jan; 23 Jan	Australian Open; Melbourne, Australia; Grand Slam $12,122,762 – hard 128S/96Q/64D/32X; Singles – Doubles – Mixed doubles	(Russia) Svetlana Kuznetsova (Russia) Vera Zvonareva; 5–7, 6–4, 6–3	(Italy) Sara Errani (Italy) Roberta Vinci	(Belgium) Kim Clijsters (Czech Republic) Petra Kvitová	(Denmark) Caroline Wozniacki (Poland) Agnieszka Radwańska (Russia) Ekaterina Makarova (Italy) Sara Errani
16 Jan; 23 Jan	Australian Open; Melbourne, Australia; Grand Slam $12,122,762 – hard 128S/96Q/64D/32X; Singles – Doubles – Mixed doubles	(United States) Bethanie Mattek-Sands (Romania) Horia Tecău; 6–3, 5–7, [10–3]	(Russia) Elena Vesnina (India) Leander Paes	(Belgium) Kim Clijsters (Czech Republic) Petra Kvitová	(Denmark) Caroline Wozniacki (Poland) Agnieszka Radwańska (Russia) Ekaterina Makarova (Italy) Sara Errani
30 Jan	Fed Cup by BNP Paribas Quarterfinals; Moscow, Russia – hard (i); Charleroi, Belgium – hard (i); Biella, Italy – clay (red) (i); Stuttgart, Germany – hard (i)	Quarterfinals winners Russia 3–2; Serbia 3–2; Italy 3–2; Czech Republic 4–1	Quarterfinals losers Spain; Belgium; Ukraine; Germany		

=== February ===
Week	Tournament	Champions	Runners-up	Semifinalists	Quarterfinalists
6 Feb	Open GDF Suez; Paris, France; WTA Premier; Hard (i) – $637,000 – 30S/16D; Singles – Doubles	(Germany) Angelique Kerber; 7–6^{(7–3)}, 5–7, 6–3	(France) Marion Bartoli	(Belgium) Yanina Wickmayer (Czech Republic) Klára Zakopalová	(Russia) Maria Sharapova (Germany) Mona Barthel (Germany) Julia Görges (Italy) Roberta Vinci
6 Feb	Open GDF Suez; Paris, France; WTA Premier; Hard (i) – $637,000 – 30S/16D; Singles – Doubles	(United States) Liezel Huber (United States) Lisa Raymond; 7–6^{(7–3)}, 6–1	(Germany) Anna-Lena Grönefeld (Croatia) Petra Martić	(Belgium) Yanina Wickmayer (Czech Republic) Klára Zakopalová	(Russia) Maria Sharapova (Germany) Mona Barthel (Germany) Julia Görges (Italy) Roberta Vinci
6 Feb	PTT Pattaya Open; Pattaya, Thailand; WTA International; Hard – $220,000 – 32S/16D; Singles – Doubles	(Slovakia) Daniela Hantuchová; 6–7^{(4–7)}, 6–3, 6–3	(Russia) Maria Kirilenko	(Romania) Sorana Cîrstea (Chinese Taipei) Hsieh Su-wei	(Russia) Vera Zvonareva (Thailand) Tamarine Tanasugarn (United States) Vania King (India) Sania Mirza
6 Feb	PTT Pattaya Open; Pattaya, Thailand; WTA International; Hard – $220,000 – 32S/16D; Singles – Doubles	(India) Sania Mirza (Australia) Anastasia Rodionova; 3–6, 6–1, [10–8]	(Chinese Taipei) Chan Hao-ching (Chinese Taipei) Chan Yung-jan	(Romania) Sorana Cîrstea (Chinese Taipei) Hsieh Su-wei	(Russia) Vera Zvonareva (Thailand) Tamarine Tanasugarn (United States) Vania King (India) Sania Mirza
13 Feb	Qatar Total Open; Doha, Qatar; WTA Premier 5 Hard – $2,168,400 – 56S/26D; Singles – Doubles	(Belarus) Victoria Azarenka; 6–1, 6–2	(Australia) Samantha Stosur	(Poland) Agnieszka Radwańska (France) Marion Bartoli	(Belgium) Yanina Wickmayer (United States) Christina McHale (Romania) Monica Niculescu (Czech Republic) Lucie Šafářová
13 Feb	Qatar Total Open; Doha, Qatar; WTA Premier 5 Hard – $2,168,400 – 56S/26D; Singles – Doubles	(United States) Liezel Huber (United States) Lisa Raymond; 6–3, 6–1	(United States) Raquel Kops-Jones (United States) Abigail Spears	(Poland) Agnieszka Radwańska (France) Marion Bartoli	(Belgium) Yanina Wickmayer (United States) Christina McHale (Romania) Monica Niculescu (Czech Republic) Lucie Šafářová
13 Feb	XX Copa BBVA Colsanitas; Bogotá, Colombia; WTA International $220,000 – clay (red) – 32S/16D; Singles – Doubles	(Spain) Lara Arruabarrena-Vecino; 6–2, 7–5	(Russia) Alexandra Panova	(Romania) Edina Gallovits-Hall (Hungary) Tímea Babos	(Colombia) Mariana Duque Mariño (Argentina) Paula Ormaechea (Kazakhstan) Yaroslava Shvedova (Italy) Karin Knapp
13 Feb	XX Copa BBVA Colsanitas; Bogotá, Colombia; WTA International $220,000 – clay (red) – 32S/16D; Singles – Doubles	(Czech Republic) Eva Birnerová (Russia) Alexandra Panova; 6–2, 6–2	(Luxembourg) Mandy Minella (Switzerland) Stefanie Vögele	(Romania) Edina Gallovits-Hall (Hungary) Tímea Babos	(Colombia) Mariana Duque Mariño (Argentina) Paula Ormaechea (Kazakhstan) Yaroslava Shvedova (Italy) Karin Knapp
20 Feb	Dubai Duty Free Tennis Championships; Dubai, United Arab Emirates; WTA Premier; Hard – $2,000,000 – 28S/16D; Singles – Doubles	(Poland) Agnieszka Radwańska; 7–5, 6–4	(Germany) Julia Görges	(Denmark) Caroline Wozniacki (Serbia) Jelena Janković	(Slovakia) Daniela Hantuchová (Serbia) Ana Ivanovic (Australia) Samantha Stosur (Germany) Sabine Lisicki
20 Feb	Dubai Duty Free Tennis Championships; Dubai, United Arab Emirates; WTA Premier; Hard – $2,000,000 – 28S/16D; Singles – Doubles	(United States) Liezel Huber (United States) Lisa Raymond; 6–2, 6–1	(India) Sania Mirza (Russia) Elena Vesnina	(Denmark) Caroline Wozniacki (Serbia) Jelena Janković	(Slovakia) Daniela Hantuchová (Serbia) Ana Ivanovic (Australia) Samantha Stosur (Germany) Sabine Lisicki
20 Feb	Memphis International; Memphis, United States; WTA International; Hard (i) – $220,000 – 32S/16Q/16D; Singles draw – Doubles draw	(Sweden) Sofia Arvidsson; 6–3, 6–4	(New Zealand) Marina Erakovic	(Russia) Vera Dushevina (Italy) Alberta Brianti	(France) Stéphanie Foretz Gacon (Netherlands) Michaëlla Krajicek (Ukraine) Lesia Tsurenko (United States) Varvara Lepchenko
20 Feb	Memphis International; Memphis, United States; WTA International; Hard (i) – $220,000 – 32S/16Q/16D; Singles draw – Doubles draw	(Czech Republic) Andrea Hlaváčková (Czech Republic) Lucie Hradecká; 6–3, 6–4	(Russia) Vera Dushevina (Belarus) Olga Govortsova	(Russia) Vera Dushevina (Italy) Alberta Brianti	(France) Stéphanie Foretz Gacon (Netherlands) Michaëlla Krajicek (Ukraine) Lesia Tsurenko (United States) Varvara Lepchenko
20 Feb	Whirlpool Monterrey Open; Monterrey, Mexico; WTA International; Hard – $220,000 – 32S/32Q/16D; Singles draw – Doubles draw	(Hungary) Tímea Babos; 6–4, 6–4	(Romania) Alexandra Cadanțu	(Hungary) Gréta Arn (Italy) Sara Errani	(Russia) Nina Bratchikova (Spain) Lourdes Domínguez Lino (Austria) Patricia Mayr-Achleitner (Luxembourg) Mandy Minella
20 Feb	Whirlpool Monterrey Open; Monterrey, Mexico; WTA International; Hard – $220,000 – 32S/32Q/16D; Singles draw – Doubles draw	(Italy) Sara Errani (Italy) Roberta Vinci; 6–2, 7–6^{(8–6)}	(Japan) Kimiko Date-Krumm (China) Zhang Shuai	(Hungary) Gréta Arn (Italy) Sara Errani	(Russia) Nina Bratchikova (Spain) Lourdes Domínguez Lino (Austria) Patricia Mayr-Achleitner (Luxembourg) Mandy Minella
27 Feb	Abierto Mexicano TELCEL p/b HSBC; Acapulco, Mexico; WTA International $220,000 – clay (red) – 32S/16D; Singles – Doubles	(Italy) Sara Errani; 5–7, 7–6^{(7–2)}, 6–0	(Italy) Flavia Pennetta	(Italy) Roberta Vinci (Romania) Irina-Camelia Begu	(Netherlands) Michaëlla Krajicek (Spain) Estrella Cabeza Candela (Slovakia) Magdaléna Rybáriková (Colombia) Mariana Duque Mariño
27 Feb	Abierto Mexicano TELCEL p/b HSBC; Acapulco, Mexico; WTA International $220,000 – clay (red) – 32S/16D; Singles – Doubles	(Italy) Sara Errani (Italy) Roberta Vinci; 6–2, 6–1	(Spain) Lourdes Domínguez Lino (Spain) Arantxa Parra Santonja	(Italy) Roberta Vinci (Romania) Irina-Camelia Begu	(Netherlands) Michaëlla Krajicek (Spain) Estrella Cabeza Candela (Slovakia) Magdaléna Rybáriková (Colombia) Mariana Duque Mariño
27 Feb	BMW Malaysian Open; Kuala Lumpur, Malaysia; WTA International; Hard – $220,000 – 32S/32Q/16D; Singles draw – Doubles draw	(Chinese Taipei) Hsieh Su-wei; 2–6, 7–5, 4–1 retired^{[b]}	(Croatia) Petra Martić	(Greece) Eleni Daniilidou (Serbia) Jelena Janković	(Poland) Agnieszka Radwańska (Australia) Olivia Rogowska (China) Peng Shuai (Japan) Ayumi Morita
27 Feb	BMW Malaysian Open; Kuala Lumpur, Malaysia; WTA International; Hard – $220,000 – 32S/32Q/16D; Singles draw – Doubles draw	(Chinese Taipei) Chang Kai-chen (Chinese Taipei) Chuang Chia-jung; 7–5, 6–4	(Chinese Taipei) Chan Hao-ching (Japan) Rika Fujiwara	(Greece) Eleni Daniilidou (Serbia) Jelena Janković	(Poland) Agnieszka Radwańska (Australia) Olivia Rogowska (China) Peng Shuai (Japan) Ayumi Morita

=== March ===
Week	Tournament	Champions	Runners-up	Semifinalists	Quarterfinalists
5 Mar; 12 Mar	BNP Paribas Open; Indian Wells, United States; WTA Premier Mandatory; Hard – $5,536,664 – 96S/32D; Singles – Doubles	(Belarus) Victoria Azarenka; 6–2, 6–3	(Russia) Maria Sharapova	(Germany) Angelique Kerber (Serbia) Ana Ivanovic	(Poland) Agnieszka Radwańska (China) Li Na (France) Marion Bartoli (Russia) Maria Kirilenko
5 Mar; 12 Mar	BNP Paribas Open; Indian Wells, United States; WTA Premier Mandatory; Hard – $5,536,664 – 96S/32D; Singles – Doubles	(United States) Liezel Huber (United States) Lisa Raymond; 6–2, 6–3	(India) Sania Mirza (Russia) Elena Vesnina	(Germany) Angelique Kerber (Serbia) Ana Ivanovic	(Poland) Agnieszka Radwańska (China) Li Na (France) Marion Bartoli (Russia) Maria Kirilenko
19 Mar; 26 Mar	Sony Ericsson Open; Key Biscayne, United States; WTA Premier Mandatory; Hard – $4,828,050 – 96S/32D; Singles – Doubles	(Poland) Agnieszka Radwańska; 7–5, 6–4	(Russia) Maria Sharapova	(France) Marion Bartoli (Denmark) Caroline Wozniacki	(Belarus) Victoria Azarenka (United States) Venus Williams (United States) Serena Williams (China) Li Na
19 Mar; 26 Mar	Sony Ericsson Open; Key Biscayne, United States; WTA Premier Mandatory; Hard – $4,828,050 – 96S/32D; Singles – Doubles	(Russia) Maria Kirilenko (Russia) Nadia Petrova; 7–6^{(7–0)}, 4–6, [10–4]	(Italy) Sara Errani (Italy) Roberta Vinci	(France) Marion Bartoli (Denmark) Caroline Wozniacki	(Belarus) Victoria Azarenka (United States) Venus Williams (United States) Serena Williams (China) Li Na

=== April ===
Week	Tournament	Champions	Runners-up	Semifinalists	Quarterfinalists
2 Apr	Family Circle Cup; Charleston, United States; WTA Premier $740,000 – clay (green) – 56S/16D; Singles – Doubles	(United States) Serena Williams; 6–0, 6–1	(Czech Republic) Lucie Šafářová	(Slovenia) Polona Hercog (Australia) Samantha Stosur	(Russia) Nadia Petrova (Russia) Vera Zvonareva (Germany) Sabine Lisicki (United States) Venus Williams
2 Apr	Family Circle Cup; Charleston, United States; WTA Premier $740,000 – clay (green) – 56S/16D; Singles – Doubles	(Russia) Anastasia Pavlyuchenkova (Czech Republic) Lucie Šafářová; 5–7, 6–4, [10–6]	(Spain) Anabel Medina Garrigues (Kazakhstan) Yaroslava Shvedova	(Slovenia) Polona Hercog (Australia) Samantha Stosur	(Russia) Nadia Petrova (Russia) Vera Zvonareva (Germany) Sabine Lisicki (United States) Venus Williams
9 Apr	Barcelona Ladies Open; Barcelona, Spain; WTA International $220,000 – clay (red) – 32S/16D; Singles – Doubles	(Italy) Sara Errani; 6–2, 6–2	(Slovakia) Dominika Cibulková	(Romania) Sorana Cîrstea (Spain) Carla Suárez Navarro	(Belarus) Olga Govortsova (Ukraine) Yuliya Beygelzimer (Romania) Simona Halep (Germany) Julia Görges
9 Apr	Barcelona Ladies Open; Barcelona, Spain; WTA International $220,000 – clay (red) – 32S/16D; Singles – Doubles	(Italy) Sara Errani (Italy) Roberta Vinci; 6–0, 6–2	(Italy) Flavia Pennetta (Italy) Francesca Schiavone	(Romania) Sorana Cîrstea (Spain) Carla Suárez Navarro	(Belarus) Olga Govortsova (Ukraine) Yuliya Beygelzimer (Romania) Simona Halep (Germany) Julia Görges
9 Apr	e-Boks Open; Copenhagen, Denmark; WTA International $220,000 – hard (i) – 32S/16D; Singles – Doubles	(Germany) Angelique Kerber; 6–4, 6–4	(Denmark) Caroline Wozniacki	(Croatia) Petra Martić (Serbia) Jelena Janković	(France) Alizé Cornet (Serbia) Bojana Jovanovski (Estonia) Kaia Kanepi (Germany) Mona Barthel
9 Apr	e-Boks Open; Copenhagen, Denmark; WTA International $220,000 – hard (i) – 32S/16D; Singles – Doubles	(Japan) Kimiko Date-Krumm (Japan) Rika Fujiwara; 6–2, 4–6, [10–5]	(Sweden) Sofia Arvidsson (Estonia) Kaia Kanepi	(Croatia) Petra Martić (Serbia) Jelena Janković	(France) Alizé Cornet (Serbia) Bojana Jovanovski (Estonia) Kaia Kanepi (Germany) Mona Barthel
April 16	Fed Cup by BNP Paribas Semifinals; Moscow, Russia – clay (i); Ostrava, Czech Republic – hard (i)	Semifinals winners Serbia 3–2; Czech Republic 4–1	Semifinals losers Russia; Italy		
April 23	Porsche Tennis Grand Prix; Stuttgart, Germany; WTA Premier $740,000 – clay (red) (i) – 28S/32Q/16D; Singles draw – Doubles draw	(Russia) Maria Sharapova; 6–1, 6–4	(Belarus) Victoria Azarenka	(Poland) Agnieszka Radwańska (Czech Republic) Petra Kvitová	(Germany) Mona Barthel (China) Li Na (Germany) Angelique Kerber (Australia) Samantha Stosur
April 23	Porsche Tennis Grand Prix; Stuttgart, Germany; WTA Premier $740,000 – clay (red) (i) – 28S/32Q/16D; Singles draw – Doubles draw	(Czech Republic) Iveta Benešová (Czech Republic) Barbora Záhlavová-Strýcová; 6–4, 7–5	(Germany) Julia Görges (Germany) Anna-Lena Grönefeld	(Poland) Agnieszka Radwańska (Czech Republic) Petra Kvitová	(Germany) Mona Barthel (China) Li Na (Germany) Angelique Kerber (Australia) Samantha Stosur
April 23	Grand Prix SAR La Princesse Lalla Meryem; Fes, Morocco; WTA International $220,000 – clay (red) – 32S/16D; Singles – Doubles	(Netherlands) Kiki Bertens; 7–5, 6–0	(Spain) Laura Pous Tió	(Romania) Simona Halep (France) Mathilde Johansson	(Spain) Anabel Medina Garrigues (Spain) Garbiñe Muguruza Blanco (Czech Republic) Petra Cetkovská (Romania) Irina-Camelia Begu
April 23	Grand Prix SAR La Princesse Lalla Meryem; Fes, Morocco; WTA International $220,000 – clay (red) – 32S/16D; Singles – Doubles	(Czech Republic) Petra Cetkovská (Russia) Alexandra Panova; 3–6, 7–6^{(7–5)}, [11–9]	(Romania) Irina-Camelia Begu (Romania) Alexandra Cadanțu	(Romania) Simona Halep (France) Mathilde Johansson	(Spain) Anabel Medina Garrigues (Spain) Garbiñe Muguruza Blanco (Czech Republic) Petra Cetkovská (Romania) Irina-Camelia Begu
30 Apr	Budapest Grand Prix; Budapest, Hungary; WTA International $220,000 – clay (red) – 32S/16D; Singles – Doubles	(Italy) Sara Errani; 7–5, 6–4	(Russia) Elena Vesnina	(Georgia (country)) Anna Tatishvili (New Zealand) Marina Erakovic	(Italy) Alberta Brianti (Canada) Aleksandra Wozniak (Czech Republic) Barbora Záhlavová-Strýcová (Croatia) Petra Martić
30 Apr	Budapest Grand Prix; Budapest, Hungary; WTA International $220,000 – clay (red) – 32S/16D; Singles – Doubles	(Slovakia) Janette Husárová (Slovakia) Magdaléna Rybáriková; 6–4, 6–2	(Czech Republic) Eva Birnerová (Netherlands) Michaëlla Krajicek	(Georgia (country)) Anna Tatishvili (New Zealand) Marina Erakovic	(Italy) Alberta Brianti (Canada) Aleksandra Wozniak (Czech Republic) Barbora Záhlavová-Strýcová (Croatia) Petra Martić
30 Apr	Estoril Open; Oeiras, Portugal; WTA International $220,000 – clay (red) – 32S/16D; Singles – Doubles	(Estonia) Kaia Kanepi; 3–6, 7–6^{(8–6)}, 6–4	(Spain) Carla Suárez Navarro	(Italy) Roberta Vinci (Italy) Karin Knapp	(Russia) Nadia Petrova (Czech Republic) Petra Cetkovská (Spain) Sílvia Soler Espinosa (Kazakhstan) Galina Voskoboeva
30 Apr	Estoril Open; Oeiras, Portugal; WTA International $220,000 – clay (red) – 32S/16D; Singles – Doubles	(Chinese Taipei) Chuang Chia-jung (China) Zhang Shuai; 4–6, 6–1, [11–9]	(Kazakhstan) Yaroslava Shvedova (Kazakhstan) Galina Voskoboeva	(Italy) Roberta Vinci (Italy) Karin Knapp	(Russia) Nadia Petrova (Czech Republic) Petra Cetkovská (Spain) Sílvia Soler Espinosa (Kazakhstan) Galina Voskoboeva

=== May ===
Week	Tournament	Champions	Runners-up	Semifinalists	Quarterfinalists
May 7	Mutua Madrid Open; Madrid, Spain; WTA Premier Mandatory $5,189,603 – clay (Blue) – 64S/32Q/28D; Singles draw – Doubles draw	(United States) Serena Williams; 6–1, 6–3	(Belarus) Victoria Azarenka	(Poland) Agnieszka Radwańska (Czech Republic) Lucie Hradecká	(China) Li Na (United States) Varvara Lepchenko (Australia) Samantha Stosur (Russia) Maria Sharapova
May 7	Mutua Madrid Open; Madrid, Spain; WTA Premier Mandatory $5,189,603 – clay (Blue) – 64S/32Q/28D; Singles draw – Doubles draw	(Italy) Sara Errani (Italy) Roberta Vinci; 6–1, 3–6, [10–4]	(Russia) Ekaterina Makarova (Russia) Elena Vesnina	(Poland) Agnieszka Radwańska (Czech Republic) Lucie Hradecká	(China) Li Na (United States) Varvara Lepchenko (Australia) Samantha Stosur (Russia) Maria Sharapova
May 14	Internazionali BNL d'Italia; Rome, Italy; WTA Premier 5 $2,168,400 – clay (red) – 56S/32Q/28D; Singles draw – Doubles draw	(Russia) Maria Sharapova; 4–6, 6–4, 7–6^{(7–5)}	(China) Li Na	(United States) Serena Williams (Germany) Angelique Kerber	(Slovakia) Dominika Cibulková (Italy) Flavia Pennetta (Czech Republic) Petra Kvitová (United States) Venus Williams
May 14	Internazionali BNL d'Italia; Rome, Italy; WTA Premier 5 $2,168,400 – clay (red) – 56S/32Q/28D; Singles draw – Doubles draw	(Italy) Sara Errani (Italy) Roberta Vinci; 6–2, 7–5	(Russia) Ekaterina Makarova (Russia) Elena Vesnina	(United States) Serena Williams (Germany) Angelique Kerber	(Slovakia) Dominika Cibulková (Italy) Flavia Pennetta (Czech Republic) Petra Kvitová (United States) Venus Williams
May 21	Brussels Open; Brussels, Belgium; WTA Premier $637,000 – clay (red) – 30S/32Q/16D; Singles draw – Doubles draw	(Poland) Agnieszka Radwańska; 7–5, 6–0	(Romania) Simona Halep	(Estonia) Kaia Kanepi (Sweden) Sofia Arvidsson	(Belgium) Alison Van Uytvanck (Bulgaria) Tsvetana Pironkova (Slovakia) Dominika Cibulková (Poland) Urszula Radwańska
May 21	Brussels Open; Brussels, Belgium; WTA Premier $637,000 – clay (red) – 30S/32Q/16D; Singles draw – Doubles draw	(United States) Bethanie Mattek-Sands (India) Sania Mirza; 6–3, 6–2	(Poland) Alicja Rosolska (China) Zheng Jie	(Estonia) Kaia Kanepi (Sweden) Sofia Arvidsson	(Belgium) Alison Van Uytvanck (Bulgaria) Tsvetana Pironkova (Slovakia) Dominika Cibulková (Poland) Urszula Radwańska
May 21	Internationaux de Strasbourg; Strasbourg, France; WTA International $220,000 – clay (red) – 32S/32Q/16D; Singles draw – Doubles draw	(Italy) Francesca Schiavone; 6–4, 6–4	(France) Alizé Cornet	(France) Pauline Parmentier (United States) Sloane Stephens	(Russia) Alexandra Panova (Spain) Anabel Medina Garrigues (Japan) Ayumi Morita (Sweden) Johanna Larsson
May 21	Internationaux de Strasbourg; Strasbourg, France; WTA International $220,000 – clay (red) – 32S/32Q/16D; Singles draw – Doubles draw	(Belarus) Olga Govortsova (Poland) Klaudia Jans-Ignacik; 6–7^{(4–7)}, 6–3, [10–3]	(South Africa) Natalie Grandin (Czech Republic) Vladimíra Uhlířová	(France) Pauline Parmentier (United States) Sloane Stephens	(Russia) Alexandra Panova (Spain) Anabel Medina Garrigues (Japan) Ayumi Morita (Sweden) Johanna Larsson
May 28; June 4	French Open; Paris, France; Grand Slam $11,315,740 – clay (red); 128S/96Q/64D/32X; Singles draw – Doubles draw – Mixed draw – Legends Doubles	(Russia) Maria Sharapova; 6–3, 6–2	(Italy) Sara Errani	(Australia) Samantha Stosur (Czech Republic) Petra Kvitová	(Slovakia) Dominika Cibulková (Germany) Angelique Kerber (Kazakhstan) Yaroslava Shvedova (Estonia) Kaia Kanepi
May 28; June 4	French Open; Paris, France; Grand Slam $11,315,740 – clay (red); 128S/96Q/64D/32X; Singles draw – Doubles draw – Mixed draw – Legends Doubles	(Italy) Sara Errani (Italy) Roberta Vinci; 4–6, 6–4, 6–2	(Russia) Maria Kirilenko (Russia) Nadia Petrova	(Australia) Samantha Stosur (Czech Republic) Petra Kvitová	(Slovakia) Dominika Cibulková (Germany) Angelique Kerber (Kazakhstan) Yaroslava Shvedova (Estonia) Kaia Kanepi
May 28; June 4	French Open; Paris, France; Grand Slam $11,315,740 – clay (red); 128S/96Q/64D/32X; Singles draw – Doubles draw – Mixed draw – Legends Doubles	(India) Sania Mirza (India) Mahesh Bhupathi; 7–6^{(7–3)}, 6–1	(Poland) Klaudia Jans-Ignacik (Mexico) Santiago González	(Australia) Samantha Stosur (Czech Republic) Petra Kvitová	(Slovakia) Dominika Cibulková (Germany) Angelique Kerber (Kazakhstan) Yaroslava Shvedova (Estonia) Kaia Kanepi

=== June ===
Week	Tournament	Champions	Runners-up	Semifinalists	Quarterfinalists
11 Jun	Aegon Classic; Birmingham, Great Britain; WTA International; Grass – $220,000 – 56S/16D; Singles – Doubles	(United States) Melanie Oudin; 6–4, 6–2	(Serbia) Jelena Janković	(China) Zheng Jie (Russia) Ekaterina Makarova	(Japan) Misaki Doi (Italy) Roberta Vinci (Chinese Taipei) Hsieh Su-wei (United States) Irina Falconi
11 Jun	Aegon Classic; Birmingham, Great Britain; WTA International; Grass – $220,000 – 56S/16D; Singles – Doubles	(Hungary) Tímea Babos; (Chinese Taipei) Hsieh Su-wei; 7–5, 6–7^{(2–7)}, [10–8]	(United States) Liezel Huber; (United States) Lisa Raymond	(China) Zheng Jie (Russia) Ekaterina Makarova	(Japan) Misaki Doi (Italy) Roberta Vinci (Chinese Taipei) Hsieh Su-wei (United States) Irina Falconi
11 Jun	NÜRNBERGER Gastein Ladies; Bad Gastein, Austria; WTA International $220,000 – clay (red) – 32S/16D; Singles – Doubles	(France) Alizé Cornet; 7–5, 7–6^{(7–1)}	(Belgium) Yanina Wickmayer	(Kazakhstan) Ksenia Pervak (Luxembourg) Mandy Minella	(Spain) Estrella Cabeza Candela (United States) Chichi Scholl (Sweden) Johanna Larsson (Austria) Yvonne Meusburger
11 Jun	NÜRNBERGER Gastein Ladies; Bad Gastein, Austria; WTA International $220,000 – clay (red) – 32S/16D; Singles – Doubles	(United States) Jill Craybas; (Germany) Julia Görges; 6–7^{(4–7)}, 6–4, [11–9]	(Germany) Anna-Lena Grönefeld; (Croatia) Petra Martić	(Kazakhstan) Ksenia Pervak (Luxembourg) Mandy Minella	(Spain) Estrella Cabeza Candela (United States) Chichi Scholl (Sweden) Johanna Larsson (Austria) Yvonne Meusburger
18 Jun	Aegon International; Eastbourne, Great Britain; WTA Premier; Grass – $637,000 – 32S/16D; Singles – Doubles	(Austria) Tamira Paszek; 5–7, 6–3, 7–5	(Germany) Angelique Kerber	(France) Marion Bartoli (Czech Republic) Klára Zakopalová	(Bulgaria) Tsvetana Pironkova (Czech Republic) Lucie Šafářová (Russia) Anastasia Pavlyuchenkova (Russia) Ekaterina Makarova
18 Jun	Aegon International; Eastbourne, Great Britain; WTA Premier; Grass – $637,000 – 32S/16D; Singles – Doubles	(Spain) Nuria Llagostera Vives (Spain) María José Martínez Sánchez 6–4, retired; (United States) Liezel Huber; (United States) Lisa Raymond		(France) Marion Bartoli (Czech Republic) Klára Zakopalová	(Bulgaria) Tsvetana Pironkova (Czech Republic) Lucie Šafářová (Russia) Anastasia Pavlyuchenkova (Russia) Ekaterina Makarova
18 Jun	UNICEF Open 's-Hertogenbosch, Netherlands; WTA International; Grass – $220,000 – 32S/16D; Singles – Doubles	(Russia) Nadia Petrova; 6–4, 6–3	(Poland) Urszula Radwańska	(Belgium) Kirsten Flipkens (Belgium) Kim Clijsters	(Italy) Roberta Vinci (Slovakia) Dominika Cibulková (Sweden) Sofia Arvidsson (Italy) Francesca Schiavone
18 Jun	UNICEF Open 's-Hertogenbosch, Netherlands; WTA International; Grass – $220,000 – 32S/16D; Singles – Doubles	(Italy) Sara Errani; (Italy) Roberta Vinci; 6–4, 3–6, [11–9]	(Russia) Maria Kirilenko; (Russia) Nadia Petrova	(Belgium) Kirsten Flipkens (Belgium) Kim Clijsters	(Italy) Roberta Vinci (Slovakia) Dominika Cibulková (Sweden) Sofia Arvidsson (Italy) Francesca Schiavone
25 Jun; 2 Jul	The Championships, Wimbledon; London, Great Britain; Grand Slam $11,174,883 – grass 128S/96Q/64D/48X; Singles – Doubles – Mixed doubles – Ladies' Invitation Doubles	(United States) Serena Williams; 6–1, 5–7, 6–2	(Poland) Agnieszka Radwańska	(Germany) Angelique Kerber (Belarus) Victoria Azarenka	(Germany) Sabine Lisicki (Russia) Maria Kirilenko (Czech Republic) Petra Kvitová (Austria) Tamira Paszek
25 Jun; 2 Jul	The Championships, Wimbledon; London, Great Britain; Grand Slam $11,174,883 – grass 128S/96Q/64D/48X; Singles – Doubles – Mixed doubles – Ladies' Invitation Doubles	(United States) Serena Williams (United States) Venus Williams; 7–5, 6–4	(Czech Republic) Andrea Hlaváčková (Czech Republic) Lucie Hradecká	(Germany) Angelique Kerber (Belarus) Victoria Azarenka	(Germany) Sabine Lisicki (Russia) Maria Kirilenko (Czech Republic) Petra Kvitová (Austria) Tamira Paszek
25 Jun; 2 Jul	The Championships, Wimbledon; London, Great Britain; Grand Slam $11,174,883 – grass 128S/96Q/64D/48X; Singles – Doubles – Mixed doubles – Ladies' Invitation Doubles	(United States) Mike Bryan (United States) Lisa Raymond; 6–3, 5–7, 6–4	(India) Leander Paes (Russia) Elena Vesnina	(Germany) Angelique Kerber (Belarus) Victoria Azarenka	(Germany) Sabine Lisicki (Russia) Maria Kirilenko (Czech Republic) Petra Kvitová (Austria) Tamira Paszek

=== July ===
Week	Tournament	Champions	Runners-up	Semifinalists		Quarterfinalists
9 Jul	Bank of the West Classic; Stanford, California, United States; WTA Premier; Hard – $740,000 – 28S/16D; Singles – Doubles	(United States) Serena Williams; 7–5, 6–3	(United States) CoCo Vandeweghe	(Romania) Sorana Cîrstea (Belgium) Yanina Wickmayer		(South Africa) Chanelle Scheepers (Slovakia) Dominika Cibulková (Poland) Urszula Radwańska (France) Marion Bartoli
9 Jul	Bank of the West Classic; Stanford, California, United States; WTA Premier; Hard – $740,000 – 28S/16D; Singles – Doubles	(New Zealand) Marina Erakovic (United Kingdom) Heather Watson; 7–5, 7–6^{(9–7)}	(Australia) Jarmila Gajdošová (United States) Vania King	(Romania) Sorana Cîrstea (Belgium) Yanina Wickmayer		(South Africa) Chanelle Scheepers (Slovakia) Dominika Cibulková (Poland) Urszula Radwańska (France) Marion Bartoli
9 Jul	Internazionali Femminili di Palermo; Palermo, Italy; WTA International $220,000 – clay (red) – 32S/16D; Singles – Doubles	(Italy) Sara Errani; 6–1, 6–3	(Czech Republic) Barbora Záhlavová-Strýcová	(Romania) Irina-Camelia Begu (United Kingdom) Laura Robson		(Romania) Alexandra Cadanțu (Spain) Estrella Cabeza Candela (Germany) Julia Görges (Spain) Carla Suárez Navarro
9 Jul	Internazionali Femminili di Palermo; Palermo, Italy; WTA International $220,000 – clay (red) – 32S/16D; Singles – Doubles	(Czech Republic) Renata Voráčová; (Czech Republic) Barbora Záhlavová-Strýcová; 7–6^{(7–5)}, 6–4	(Croatia) Darija Jurak; (Hungary) Katalin Marosi	(Romania) Irina-Camelia Begu (United Kingdom) Laura Robson		(Romania) Alexandra Cadanțu (Spain) Estrella Cabeza Candela (Germany) Julia Görges (Spain) Carla Suárez Navarro
16 Jul	Mercury Insurance Open; Carlsbad, California, United States; WTA Premier; Hard – $740,000 – 28S/16D; Singles – Doubles	(Slovakia) Dominika Cibulková; 6–1, 7–5	(France) Marion Bartoli	(Chinese Taipei) Chan Yung-jan (Russia) Nadia Petrova		(United States) Christina McHale (Serbia) Jelena Janković (United States) Varvara Lepchenko (Poland) Urszula Radwańska
16 Jul	Mercury Insurance Open; Carlsbad, California, United States; WTA Premier; Hard – $740,000 – 28S/16D; Singles – Doubles	(United States) Raquel Kops-Jones; (United States) Abigail Spears; 6–2, 6–4	(United States) Vania King; (Russia) Nadia Petrova	(Chinese Taipei) Chan Yung-jan (Russia) Nadia Petrova		(United States) Christina McHale (Serbia) Jelena Janković (United States) Varvara Lepchenko (Poland) Urszula Radwańska
16 Jul	Sony Ericsson Swedish Open; Båstad, Sweden; WTA International $220,000 – clay (red) – 32S/16D; Singles – Doubles	(Slovenia) Polona Hercog; 0–6, 6–4, 7–5	(France) Mathilde Johansson	(Sweden) Johanna Larsson (Germany) Mona Barthel		(Russia) Anastasia Pavlyuchenkova (Czech Republic) Klára Zakopalová (Sweden) Sofia Arvidsson (Bulgaria) Tsvetana Pironkova
16 Jul	Sony Ericsson Swedish Open; Båstad, Sweden; WTA International $220,000 – clay (red) – 32S/16D; Singles – Doubles	(Colombia) Catalina Castaño; (Colombia) Mariana Duque Mariño; 6–4, 5–7, [10–6]	(Czech Republic) Eva Hrdinová; (Bosnia and Herzegovina) Mervana Jugić-Salkić	(Sweden) Johanna Larsson (Germany) Mona Barthel		(Russia) Anastasia Pavlyuchenkova (Czech Republic) Klára Zakopalová (Sweden) Sofia Arvidsson (Bulgaria) Tsvetana Pironkova
23 Jul	Baku Cup; Baku, Azerbaijan; WTA International; Hard – $220,000 – 32S/16D; Singles – Doubles	(Serbia) Bojana Jovanovski; 6–3, 6–1	(United States) Julia Cohen	(Russia) Olga Puchkova (Russia) Alexandra Panova		(Slovakia) Magdaléna Rybáriková (Luxembourg) Mandy Minella (Serbia) Aleksandra Krunić (Russia) Nina Bratchikova
23 Jul	Baku Cup; Baku, Azerbaijan; WTA International; Hard – $220,000 – 32S/16D; Singles – Doubles	(Ukraine) Irina Buryachok (Russia) Valeriya Solovyeva; 6–3, 6–2	(Czech Republic) Eva Birnerová (Italy) Alberta Brianti	(Russia) Olga Puchkova (Russia) Alexandra Panova		(Slovakia) Magdaléna Rybáriková (Luxembourg) Mandy Minella (Serbia) Aleksandra Krunić (Russia) Nina Bratchikova
30 July	Summer Olympic Games; London, Great Britain; Summer Olympic Games; Grass; 64S/32D/16X; Singles – Doubles – Mixed doubles	Gold	Silver	Bronze	Fourth place	(Germany) Angelique Kerber (Denmark) Caroline Wozniacki (Belgium) Kim Clijsters (Czech Republic) Petra Kvitová
30 July	Summer Olympic Games; London, Great Britain; Summer Olympic Games; Grass; 64S/32D/16X; Singles – Doubles – Mixed doubles	(United States) Serena Williams; 6–0, 6–1	(Russia) Maria Sharapova	(Belarus) Victoria Azarenka; 6–3, 6–4	(Russia) Maria Kirilenko	(Germany) Angelique Kerber (Denmark) Caroline Wozniacki (Belgium) Kim Clijsters (Czech Republic) Petra Kvitová
30 July	Summer Olympic Games; London, Great Britain; Summer Olympic Games; Grass; 64S/32D/16X; Singles – Doubles – Mixed doubles	(United States) Serena Williams (United States) Venus Williams; 6–4, 6–4	(Czech Republic) Andrea Hlaváčková (Czech Republic) Lucie Hradecká	(Russia) Maria Kirilenko (Russia) Nadia Petrova; 4–6, 6–4, 6–1	(United States) Liezel Huber (United States) Lisa Raymond	(Germany) Angelique Kerber (Denmark) Caroline Wozniacki (Belgium) Kim Clijsters (Czech Republic) Petra Kvitová
30 July	Summer Olympic Games; London, Great Britain; Summer Olympic Games; Grass; 64S/32D/16X; Singles – Doubles – Mixed doubles	(Belarus) Victoria Azarenka (Belarus) Max Mirnyi; 2–6, 6–3, [10–8]	(United Kingdom) Laura Robson (United Kingdom) Andy Murray	(United States) Lisa Raymond (United States) Mike Bryan; 6–3, 4–6, [10–4]	(Germany) Sabine Lisicki (Germany) Christopher Kas	(Germany) Angelique Kerber (Denmark) Caroline Wozniacki (Belgium) Kim Clijsters (Czech Republic) Petra Kvitová
30 July	Citi Open; Washington, D.C., United States; WTA International; Hard – $220,000 – 32S/16D; Singles – Doubles	(Slovakia) Magdaléna Rybáriková; 6–1, 6–1	(Russia) Anastasia Pavlyuchenkova	(United States) Vania King (United States) Sloane Stephens		(Chinese Taipei) Chang Kai-chen (United States) CoCo Vandeweghe (Canada) Eugenie Bouchard (Slovakia) Jana Čepelová
30 July	Citi Open; Washington, D.C., United States; WTA International; Hard – $220,000 – 32S/16D; Singles – Doubles	(Japan) Shuko Aoyama (Chinese Taipei) Chang Kai-chen; 7–5, 6–2	(United States) Irina Falconi (South Africa) Chanelle Scheepers	(United States) Vania King (United States) Sloane Stephens		(Chinese Taipei) Chang Kai-chen (United States) CoCo Vandeweghe (Canada) Eugenie Bouchard (Slovakia) Jana Čepelová

=== August ===
Week	Tournament	Champions	Runners-up	Semifinalists	Quarterfinalists
6 Aug	Rogers Cup p/b National Bank; Montreal, Canada; WTA Premier 5 Hard – $2,168,400 – 48S/64Q/28D; Singles – Doubles	(Czech Republic) Petra Kvitová; 7–5, 2–6, 6–3	(China) Li Na	(Denmark) Caroline Wozniacki (Czech Republic) Lucie Šafářová	(Austria) Tamira Paszek (Canada) Aleksandra Wozniak (Italy) Roberta Vinci (Poland) Agnieszka Radwańska
6 Aug	Rogers Cup p/b National Bank; Montreal, Canada; WTA Premier 5 Hard – $2,168,400 – 48S/64Q/28D; Singles – Doubles	(Poland) Klaudia Jans-Ignacik; (France) Kristina Mladenovic; 7–5, 2–6, [10–7]	(Russia) Nadia Petrova; (Slovenia) Katarina Srebotnik	(Denmark) Caroline Wozniacki (Czech Republic) Lucie Šafářová	(Austria) Tamira Paszek (Canada) Aleksandra Wozniak (Italy) Roberta Vinci (Poland) Agnieszka Radwańska
13 Aug	Western & Southern Open; Mason, Ohio, United States; WTA Premier 5 Hard – $2,168,400 – 56S/28D; Singles – Doubles	(China) Li Na; 1–6, 6–3, 6–1	(Germany) Angelique Kerber	(United States) Venus Williams (Czech Republic) Petra Kvitová	(Poland) Agnieszka Radwańska (Australia) Samantha Stosur (Russia) Anastasia Pavlyuchenkova (United States) Serena Williams
13 Aug	Western & Southern Open; Mason, Ohio, United States; WTA Premier 5 Hard – $2,168,400 – 56S/28D; Singles – Doubles	(Czech Republic) Andrea Hlaváčková (Czech Republic) Lucie Hradecká; 6–1, 6–3	(Slovenia) Katarina Srebotnik (China) Zheng Jie	(United States) Venus Williams (Czech Republic) Petra Kvitová	(Poland) Agnieszka Radwańska (Australia) Samantha Stosur (Russia) Anastasia Pavlyuchenkova (United States) Serena Williams
20 Aug	New Haven Open at Yale; New Haven, United States; WTA Premier; Hard – $637,000 – 28S/16D; Singles – Doubles	(Czech Republic) Petra Kvitová; 7–6^{(11–9)}, 7–5	(Russia) Maria Kirilenko	(Denmark) Caroline Wozniacki (Italy) Sara Errani	(Belarus) Olga Govortsova (Slovakia) Dominika Cibulková (France) Marion Bartoli (Czech Republic) Lucie Šafářová
20 Aug	New Haven Open at Yale; New Haven, United States; WTA Premier; Hard – $637,000 – 28S/16D; Singles – Doubles	(United States) Liezel Huber (United States) Lisa Raymond; 4–6, 6–0, [10–4]	(Czech Republic) Andrea Hlaváčková (Czech Republic) Lucie Hradecká	(Denmark) Caroline Wozniacki (Italy) Sara Errani	(Belarus) Olga Govortsova (Slovakia) Dominika Cibulková (France) Marion Bartoli (Czech Republic) Lucie Šafářová
20 Aug	Texas Tennis Open; Dallas, United States; WTA International; Hard – $220,000 – 32S/16D; Singles – Doubles	(Italy) Roberta Vinci; 7–5, 6–3	(Serbia) Jelena Janković	(Serbia) Bojana Jovanovski (Australia) Casey Dellacqua	(China) Peng Shuai (South Africa) Chanelle Scheepers (Canada) Aleksandra Wozniak (Romania) Sorana Cîrstea
20 Aug	Texas Tennis Open; Dallas, United States; WTA International; Hard – $220,000 – 32S/16D; Singles – Doubles	(New Zealand) Marina Erakovic (United Kingdom) Heather Watson; 6–3, 6–0	(Latvia) Līga Dekmeijere (United States) Irina Falconi	(Serbia) Bojana Jovanovski (Australia) Casey Dellacqua	(China) Peng Shuai (South Africa) Chanelle Scheepers (Canada) Aleksandra Wozniak (Romania) Sorana Cîrstea
27 Aug; 3 Sep	US Open; New York City, United States; Grand Slam $11,517,008 – hard 128S/128Q/64D/32X; Singles – Doubles – Mixed doubles	(United States) Serena Williams; 6–2, 2–6, 7–5	(Belarus) Victoria Azarenka	(Russia) Maria Sharapova (Italy) Sara Errani	(Australia) Samantha Stosur (France) Marion Bartoli (Serbia) Ana Ivanovic (Italy) Roberta Vinci
27 Aug; 3 Sep	US Open; New York City, United States; Grand Slam $11,517,008 – hard 128S/128Q/64D/32X; Singles – Doubles – Mixed doubles	(Italy) Sara Errani (Italy) Roberta Vinci; 6–4, 6–2	(Czech Republic) Andrea Hlaváčková (Czech Republic) Lucie Hradecká	(Russia) Maria Sharapova (Italy) Sara Errani	(Australia) Samantha Stosur (France) Marion Bartoli (Serbia) Ana Ivanovic (Italy) Roberta Vinci
27 Aug; 3 Sep	US Open; New York City, United States; Grand Slam $11,517,008 – hard 128S/128Q/64D/32X; Singles – Doubles – Mixed doubles	(Russia) Ekaterina Makarova (Brazil) Bruno Soares; 6–7^{(8–10)}, 6–1, [12–10]	(Czech Republic) Květa Peschke (Poland) Marcin Matkowski	(Russia) Maria Sharapova (Italy) Sara Errani	(Australia) Samantha Stosur (France) Marion Bartoli (Serbia) Ana Ivanovic (Italy) Roberta Vinci

=== September ===
Week	Tournament	Champions	Runners-up	Semifinalists	Quarterfinalists
10 Sep	Tashkent Open; Tashkent, Uzbekistan; WTA International; Hard – $220,000 – 32S/16D; Singles – Doubles	(Romania) Irina-Camelia Begu; 6–4, 6–4	(Croatia) Donna Vekić	(Czech Republic) Eva Birnerová (Poland) Urszula Radwańska	(Romania) Alexandra Cadanțu (Serbia) Bojana Jovanovski (Kazakhstan) Galina Voskoboeva (Russia) Alexandra Panova
10 Sep	Tashkent Open; Tashkent, Uzbekistan; WTA International; Hard – $220,000 – 32S/16D; Singles – Doubles	(Poland) Paula Kania (Belarus) Polina Pekhova; 6–2, ret.	(Russia) Anna Chakvetadze (Serbia) Vesna Dolonc	(Czech Republic) Eva Birnerová (Poland) Urszula Radwańska	(Romania) Alexandra Cadanțu (Serbia) Bojana Jovanovski (Kazakhstan) Galina Voskoboeva (Russia) Alexandra Panova
10 Sep	Bell Challenge; Quebec City, Canada; WTA International; Carpet (i) – $220,000 – 32S/16D; Singles – Doubles	(Belgium) Kirsten Flipkens; 6–1, 7–5	(Czech Republic) Lucie Hradecká	(Germany) Mona Barthel (France) Kristina Mladenovic	(Georgia (country)) Anna Tatishvili (Czech Republic) Barbora Záhlavová-Strýcová (United States) Melanie Oudin (United States) Lauren Davis
10 Sep	Bell Challenge; Quebec City, Canada; WTA International; Carpet (i) – $220,000 – 32S/16D; Singles – Doubles	(Germany) Tatjana Malek (France) Kristina Mladenovic; 7–6^{(7–5)}, 6–7^{(6–8)}, [10–7]	(Poland) Alicja Rosolska (United Kingdom) Heather Watson	(Germany) Mona Barthel (France) Kristina Mladenovic	(Georgia (country)) Anna Tatishvili (Czech Republic) Barbora Záhlavová-Strýcová (United States) Melanie Oudin (United States) Lauren Davis
17 Sep	KDB Korea Open; Seoul, South Korea; WTA International; Hard – $500,000 – 32S/16D; Singles – Doubles	(Denmark) Caroline Wozniacki; 6–1, 6–0	(Estonia) Kaia Kanepi	(Russia) Ekaterina Makarova (United States) Varvara Lepchenko	(Czech Republic) Klara Zakopalová (Spain) María José Martínez Sánchez (Netherlands) Kiki Bertens (Austria) Tamira Paszek
17 Sep	KDB Korea Open; Seoul, South Korea; WTA International; Hard – $500,000 – 32S/16D; Singles – Doubles	(United States) Raquel Kops-Jones (United States) Abigail Spears; 2–6, 6–2, [10–8]	(Uzbekistan) Akgul Amanmuradova (United States) Vania King	(Russia) Ekaterina Makarova (United States) Varvara Lepchenko	(Czech Republic) Klara Zakopalová (Spain) María José Martínez Sánchez (Netherlands) Kiki Bertens (Austria) Tamira Paszek
17 Sep	Guangzhou International Women's Open; Guangzhou, China; WTA International; Hard – $220,000 – 32S/16D; Singles – Doubles	(Chinese Taipei) Hsieh Su-wei; 6–3, 5–7, 6–4	(United Kingdom) Laura Robson	(Poland) Urszula Radwańska (Romania) Sorana Cîrstea	(France) Mathilde Johansson (South Africa) Chanelle Scheepers (France) Alizé Cornet (China) Peng Shuai
17 Sep	Guangzhou International Women's Open; Guangzhou, China; WTA International; Hard – $220,000 – 32S/16D; Singles – Doubles	(Thailand) Tamarine Tanasugarn (China) Zhang Shuai; 2–6, 6–2, [10–8]	(Australia) Jarmila Gajdošová (Romania) Monica Niculescu	(Poland) Urszula Radwańska (Romania) Sorana Cîrstea	(France) Mathilde Johansson (South Africa) Chanelle Scheepers (France) Alizé Cornet (China) Peng Shuai
24 Sep	Toray Pan Pacific Open; Tokyo, Japan; WTA Premier 5 Hard – $2,168,400 – 56S/16D; Singles – Doubles	(Russia) Nadia Petrova; 6–0, 1–6, 6–3	(Poland) Agnieszka Radwańska	(Germany) Angelique Kerber (Australia) Samantha Stosur	(Belarus) Victoria Azarenka (Denmark) Caroline Wozniacki (Italy) Sara Errani (Russia) Maria Sharapova
24 Sep	Toray Pan Pacific Open; Tokyo, Japan; WTA Premier 5 Hard – $2,168,400 – 56S/16D; Singles – Doubles	(United States) Raquel Kops-Jones (United States) Abigail Spears; 6–1, 6–4	(Germany) Anna-Lena Grönefeld (Czech Republic) Květa Peschke	(Germany) Angelique Kerber (Australia) Samantha Stosur	(Belarus) Victoria Azarenka (Denmark) Caroline Wozniacki (Italy) Sara Errani (Russia) Maria Sharapova

=== October ===
Week	Tournament	Champions	Runners-up	Semifinalists	Quarterfinalists
1 Oct	China Open; Beijing, China; WTA Premier Mandatory; Hard – $4,828,050 – 60S/28D; Singles – Doubles	(Belarus) Victoria Azarenka; 6–3, 6–1	(Russia) Maria Sharapova	(France) Marion Bartoli (China) Li Na	(Switzerland) Romina Oprandi (Spain) Carla Suárez Navarro (Poland) Agnieszka Radwańska (Germany) Angelique Kerber
1 Oct	China Open; Beijing, China; WTA Premier Mandatory; Hard – $4,828,050 – 60S/28D; Singles – Doubles	(Russia) Ekaterina Makarova (Russia) Elena Vesnina; 7–5, 7–5	(Spain) Nuria Llagostera Vives (India) Sania Mirza	(France) Marion Bartoli (China) Li Na	(Switzerland) Romina Oprandi (Spain) Carla Suárez Navarro (Poland) Agnieszka Radwańska (Germany) Angelique Kerber
8 Oct	Generali Ladies Linz p/b voestalpine Linz, Austria; WTA International; Hard (i) – $220,000 – 32S/16D; Singles – Doubles	(Belarus) Victoria Azarenka; 6–3, 6–4	(Germany) Julia Görges	(Romania) Irina-Camelia Begu (Belgium) Kirsten Flipkens	(Croatia) Petra Martić (United States) Bethanie Mattek-Sands (Sweden) Sofia Arvidsson (Serbia) Ana Ivanovic
8 Oct	Generali Ladies Linz p/b voestalpine Linz, Austria; WTA International; Hard (i) – $220,000 – 32S/16D; Singles – Doubles	(Germany) Anna-Lena Grönefeld; (Czech Republic) Květa Peschke; 6–3, 6–4	(Germany) Julia Görges; (Czech Republic) Barbora Záhlavová-Strýcová	(Romania) Irina-Camelia Begu (Belgium) Kirsten Flipkens	(Croatia) Petra Martić (United States) Bethanie Mattek-Sands (Sweden) Sofia Arvidsson (Serbia) Ana Ivanovic
8 Oct	HP Japan Women's Open Tennis; Osaka, Japan; WTA International; Hard – $220,000 – 32S/16D; Singles – Doubles	(United Kingdom) Heather Watson; 7–5, 5–7, 7–6^{(7–4)}	(Chinese Taipei) Chang Kai-chen	(Australia) Samantha Stosur (Japan) Misaki Doi	(United States) Jamie Hampton (United Kingdom) Laura Robson (South Africa) Chanelle Scheepers (France) Pauline Parmentier
8 Oct	HP Japan Women's Open Tennis; Osaka, Japan; WTA International; Hard – $220,000 – 32S/16D; Singles – Doubles	(United States) Raquel Kops-Jones; (United States) Abigail Spears; 6–1, 6–4	(Japan) Kimiko Date-Krumm; (United Kingdom) Heather Watson	(Australia) Samantha Stosur (Japan) Misaki Doi	(United States) Jamie Hampton (United Kingdom) Laura Robson (South Africa) Chanelle Scheepers (France) Pauline Parmentier
15 Oct	Kremlin Cup; Moscow, Russia; WTA Premier; Hard (i) – $740,000 – 28S/16D; Singles – Doubles	(Denmark) Caroline Wozniacki; 6–2, 4–6, 7–5	(Australia) Samantha Stosur	(Serbia) Ana Ivanovic (Sweden) Sofia Arvidsson	(Czech Republic) Klára Zakopalová (Serbia) Vesna Dolonc (Slovakia) Dominika Cibulková (Russia) Maria Kirilenko
15 Oct	Kremlin Cup; Moscow, Russia; WTA Premier; Hard (i) – $740,000 – 28S/16D; Singles – Doubles	(Russia) Ekaterina Makarova; (Russia) Elena Vesnina; 6–3, 1–6, [10–8]	(Russia) Maria Kirilenko; (Russia) Nadia Petrova	(Serbia) Ana Ivanovic (Sweden) Sofia Arvidsson	(Czech Republic) Klára Zakopalová (Serbia) Vesna Dolonc (Slovakia) Dominika Cibulková (Russia) Maria Kirilenko
15 Oct	BGL BNP Paribas Luxembourg Open; Kockelscheuer, Luxembourg; WTA International; Hard (i) – $220,000 – 32S/16D; Singles – Doubles	(United States) Venus Williams; 6–2, 6–3	(Romania) Monica Niculescu	(Germany) Andrea Petkovic (Slovakia) Daniela Hantuchová	(Italy) Roberta Vinci (Kazakhstan) Ksenia Pervak (Spain) Lourdes Domínguez Lino (Czech Republic) Lucie Hradecká
15 Oct	BGL BNP Paribas Luxembourg Open; Kockelscheuer, Luxembourg; WTA International; Hard (i) – $220,000 – 32S/16D; Singles – Doubles	(Czech Republic) Andrea Hlaváčková; (Czech Republic) Lucie Hradecká; 6–3, 6–4	(Romania) Irina-Camelia Begu; (Romania) Monica Niculescu	(Germany) Andrea Petkovic (Slovakia) Daniela Hantuchová	(Italy) Roberta Vinci (Kazakhstan) Ksenia Pervak (Spain) Lourdes Domínguez Lino (Czech Republic) Lucie Hradecká
22 Oct	TEB BNP Paribas WTA Championships; Istanbul, Turkey; Year-end championships Hard (i) – $4,900,000 – 8S (RR)/4D; Singles – Doubles	(United States) Serena Williams; 6–4, 6–3	(Russia) Maria Sharapova	(Poland) Agnieszka Radwańska (Belarus) Victoria Azarenka	Round robin losers (Germany) Angelique Kerber (China) Li Na (Italy) Sara Errani (Czech Republic) Petra Kvitová (withdrew) (Australia) Samantha Stosur
22 Oct	TEB BNP Paribas WTA Championships; Istanbul, Turkey; Year-end championships Hard (i) – $4,900,000 – 8S (RR)/4D; Singles – Doubles	(Russia) Maria Kirilenko (Russia) Nadia Petrova; 6–1, 6–4	(Czech Republic) Andrea Hlaváčková (Czech Republic) Lucie Hradecká	(Poland) Agnieszka Radwańska (Belarus) Victoria Azarenka	Round robin losers (Germany) Angelique Kerber (China) Li Na (Italy) Sara Errani (Czech Republic) Petra Kvitová (withdrew) (Australia) Samantha Stosur
29 Oct	Qatar Airways Tournament of Champions; Sofia, Bulgaria; Year-end championships Hard (i) – $750,000 – 8S (RR); Singles	(Russia) Nadia Petrova; 6–2, 6–1	(Denmark) Caroline Wozniacki	(Bulgaria) Tsvetana Pironkova (Italy) Roberta Vinci	Round robin losers (Slovakia) Daniela Hantuchová (Chinese Taipei) Hsieh Su-wei (Sweden) Sofia Arvidsson (China) Zheng Jie (Russia) Maria Kirilenko (withdrew)
29 Oct	Fed Cup by BNP Paribas Final; Prague, Czech Republic	Czech Republic; 3–1	Serbia		

== Statistical information ==
These tables present the number of singles (S), doubles (D), and mixed doubles (X) titles won by each player and each nation during the season, within all the tournament categories of the 2012 WTA Tour: the Grand Slam tournaments, the tennis event at the London Summer Olympic Games, the year-end championships (the WTA Tour Championships and the Tournament of Champions), the WTA Premier tournaments (Premier Mandatory, Premier 5, and regular Premier), and the WTA International tournaments. The players/nations are sorted by: 1) total number of titles (a doubles title won by two players representing the same nation counts as only one win for the nation); 2) cumulated importance of those titles (one Grand Slam win equalling two Premier Mandatory/Premier 5 wins, one year-end championships win equalling one-and-a-half Premier Mandatory/Premier 5 win, one Premier Mandatory/Premier 5 win equalling two Premier wins, one Olympic win equalling one-and-a-half Premier win, one Premier win equalling two International wins); 3) a singles > doubles > mixed doubles hierarchy; 4) alphabetical order (by family names for players).

=== Key ===
Grand Slam tournaments
Summer Olympic Games
Year-end championships
WTA Premier Mandatory
WTA Premier 5
WTA Premier
WTA International

To avoid confusion and double counting, these tables should be updated only after an event is completed. The tables are through to the tournaments of the week of September 9.

=== Titles won by player ===
Total	Player	Grand Slam			Olympic Games			Year-end		Premier Mandatory		Premier 5		Premier		International		Total		
Total	Player	S	D	X	S	D	X	S	D	S	D	S	D	S	D	S	D	S	D	X
12	Sara Errani (ITA)		● ●								●		●			● ● ● ●	● ● ● ●	4	8	0
9	Serena Williams (USA)	● ●	●		●	●		●		●				● ●				7	2	0
9	Roberta Vinci (ITA)		● ●								●		●			●	● ● ● ●	1	8	0
7	Victoria Azarenka (BLR)	●					●			● ●		●		●		●		6	0	1
6	Lisa Raymond (USA)			●							●		●		● ● ●			0	5	1
5	Nadia Petrova (RUS)							●	●		●	●				●		3	2	0
5	Liezel Huber (USA)										●		●		● ● ●			0	5	0
4	Raquel Kops-Jones (USA)												●		●		● ●	0	4	0
4	Abigail Spears (USA)												●		●		● ●	0	4	0
4	Andrea Hlaváčková (CZE)												●				● ● ●	0	4	0
4	Lucie Hradecká (CZE)												●				● ● ●	0	4	0
3	Maria Sharapova (RUS)	●										●		●				3	0	0
3	Venus Williams (USA)		●			●										●		1	2	0
3	Ekaterina Makarova (RUS)			●							●				●			0	2	1
3	Sania Mirza (IND)			●											●		●	0	2	1
3	Agnieszka Radwańska (POL)									●				● ●				3	0	0
3	Heather Watson (GBR)														●	●	●	1	2	0
3	Hsieh Su-wei (TPE)															● ●	●	2	1	0
2	Bethanie Mattek-Sands (USA)			●											●			0	1	1
2	Maria Kirilenko (RUS)								●		●							0	2	0
2	Elena Vesnina (RUS)										●				●			0	2	0
2	Petra Kvitová (CZE)											●		●				2	0	0
2	Klaudia Jans-Ignacik (POL)												●				●	0	2	0
2	Kristina Mladenovic (FRA)												●				●	0	2	0
2	Kaia Kanepi (EST)													●		●		2	0	0
2	Angelique Kerber (GER)													●		●		2	0	0
2	Caroline Wozniacki (DNK)													●		●		2	0	0
2	Marina Erakovic (NZL)														●		●	0	2	0
2	Květa Peschke (CZE)														●		●	0	2	0
2	Barbora Záhlavová-Strýcová (CZE)														●		●	0	2	0
2	Tímea Babos (HUN)															●	●	1	1	0
2	Irina-Camelia Begu (ROU)															●	●	1	1	0
2	Magdaléna Rybáriková (SVK)															●	●	1	1	0
2	Chuang Chia-jung (TPE)																● ●	0	2	0
2	Chang Kai-chen (TPE)																● ●	0	2	0
2	Alexandra Panova (RUS)																● ●	0	2	0
2	Zhang Shuai (CHN)																● ●	0	2	0
2	Nuria Llagostera Vives (ESP)														● ●			0	1	0
1	Svetlana Kuznetsova (RUS)		●															0	1	0
1	Vera Zvonareva (RUS)		●															0	1	0
1	Li Na (CHN)											●						1	0	0
1	Dominika Cibulková (SVK)													●				1	0	0
1	Tamira Paszek (AUT)													●				1	0	0
1	Iveta Benešová (CZE)														●			0	1	0
1	Arantxa Parra Santonja (ESP)														●			0	1	0
1	María José Martínez Sánchez (ESP)														●			0	1	0
1	Anastasia Pavlyuchenkova (RUS)														●			0	1	0
1	Lucie Šafářová (CZE)														●			0	1	0
1	Katarina Srebotnik (SLO)														●			0	1	0
1	Lara Arruabarrena-Vecino (ESP)															●		1	0	0
1	Sofia Arvidsson (SWE)															●		1	0	0
1	Mona Barthel (GER)															●		1	0	0
1	Kiki Bertens (NED)															●		1	0	0
1	Alizé Cornet (FRA)															●		1	0	0
1	Kirsten Flipkens (BEL)															●		1	0	0
1	Daniela Hantuchová (SVK)															●		1	0	0
1	Polona Hercog (SLO)															●		1	0	0
1	Bojana Jovanovski (SRB)															●		1	0	0
1	Melanie Oudin (USA)															●		1	0	0
1	Francesca Schiavone (ITA)															●		1	0	0
1	Zheng Jie (CHN)															●		1	0	0
1	Shuko Aoyama (JPN)																●	0	1	0
1	Eva Birnerová (CZE)																●	0	1	0
1	Irina Buryachok (UKR)																●	0	1	0
1	Catalina Castaño (COL)																●	0	1	0
1	Petra Cetkovská (CZE)																●	0	1	0
1	Jill Craybas (USA)																●	0	1	0
1	Kimiko Date-Krumm (JPN)																●	0	1	0
1	Mariana Duque Mariño (COL)																●	0	1	0
1	Rika Fujiwara (JPN)																●	0	1	0
1	Julia Görges (GER)																●	0	1	0
1	Olga Govortsova (BLR)																●	0	1	0
1	Anna-Lena Grönefeld (GER)																●	0	1	0
1	Janette Husárová (SVK)																●	0	1	0
1	Paula Kania (POL)																●	0	1	0
1	Tatjana Malek (GER)																●	0	1	0
1	Monica Niculescu (ROU)																●	0	1	0
1	Polina Pekhova (BLR)																●	0	1	0
1	Anastasia Rodionova (AUS)																●	0	1	0
1	Valeria Solovieva (RUS)																●	0	1	0
1	Tamarine Tanasugarn (THA)																●	0	1	0
1	Renata Voráčová (CZE)																●	0	1	0

=== Titles won by nation ===
Total	Nation	Grand Slam			Olympic Games			Year-end		Premier Mandatory		Premier 5		Premier		International		Total		
Total	Nation	S	D	X	S	D	X	S	D	S	D	S	D	S	D	S	D	S	D	X
24	United States	2	1	2	1	1		1		1	1		2	2	5	2	3	9	13	2
16	Russia	1	1	1				1	1		2	2		1	2	1	3	6	9	1
15	Czech Republic											1	1	1	3		7	2	11	0
14	Italy		2								1		1			6	4	6	8	0
9	Belarus	1					1			2		1		1		1	2	6	2	1
6	Poland									1			1	2			2	3	3	0
6	Germany													1		2	3	3	3	0
6	Taiwan															2	4	2	4	0
4	China											1				1	2	2	2	0
4	Slovakia													1		2	1	3	1	0
3	India			1											1		1	0	2	1
3	France												1			1	1	1	2	0
3	Germany														1	1	1	1	1	0
3	Spain														2	1		1	2	0
2	Denmark													1		1		2	0	0
2	Estonia													1		1		2	0	0
2	Slovenia														1	1		1	1	0
2	New Zealand														1		1	0	2	0
2	Hungary															1	1	1	1	0
2	Romania															1	1	1	1	0
2	Japan																2	0	2	0
1	Austria													1				1	0	0
1	Belgium															1		1	0	0
1	Netherlands															1		1	0	0
1	Serbia															1		1	0	0
1	Sweden															1		1	0	0
1	Australia																1	0	1	0
1	Colombia																1	0	1	0
1	Ukraine																1	0	1	0
1	Thailand																1	0	1	0

=== Titles information ===
The following players won their first main circuit title in singles, doubles, or mixed doubles:

Singles

- (Spain) Lara Arruabarrena-Vecino – Bogotá (singles)
- (Hungary) Tímea Babos – Monterrey (singles)
- (Germany) Mona Barthel – Hobart (singles)
- (Netherlands) Kiki Bertens – Fes (singles)
- (Romania) Irina-Camelia Begu – Tashkent (singles)
- (Chinese Taipei) Hsieh Su-wei – Kuala Lumpur (singles)
- (Serbia) Bojana Jovanovski – Baku (singles)
- (Germany) Angelique Kerber – Paris (singles)
- (United Kingdom) Heather Watson – Osaka (singles)
- (Belgium) Kirsten Flipkens – Quebec City (singles)

Doubles

- (Japan) Shuko Aoyama – Washington, D.C. (doubles)
- (Hungary) Tímea Babos – Birmingham (doubles)
- (Romania) Irina-Camelia Begu – Hobart (doubles)
- (Ukraine) Irina Buryachok – Baku (doubles)
- (Colombia) Catalina Castaño – Båstad (doubles)
- (Colombia) Mariana Duque Mariño – Båstad (doubles)
- (Japan) Rika Fujiwara – Copenhagen (doubles)
- (Poland) Paula Kania – Tashkent (doubles)
- (Germany) Tatjana Malek – Quebec City (doubles)
- (France) Kristina Mladenovic – Montreal (doubles)
- (Belarus) Polina Pekhova – Tashkent (doubles)
- (Slovakia) Magdaléna Rybáriková – Budapest (doubles)
- (Czech Republic) Lucie Šafářová – Charleston (doubles)
- (Russia) Valeriya Solovyeva – Baku (doubles)
- (United Kingdom) Heather Watson – Stanford (doubles)

Mixed doubles

- (United States) Bethanie Mattek-Sands – Australian Open (mixed doubles)
- (Russia) Ekaterina Makarova – US Open (mixed doubles)

The following players defended a main circuit title in singles, doubles, or mixed doubles:

Singles

- (Slovakia) Daniela Hantuchová – Pattaya City (singles)
- (Slovenia) Polona Hercog – Båstad (singles)
- (Russia) Maria Sharapova – Rome (singles)
- (United States) Serena Williams – Stanford (singles)

Doubles

- (United States) Liezel Huber – Dubai (doubles)
- (United States) Serena Williams – Olympics (doubles)
- (United States) Venus Williams – Olympics (doubles)

== Rankings ==
The Race to the Championships determines the players in the WTA Tour Championships in October. The WTA rankings are based on tournaments of the latest 52 weeks.

=== Singles ===
The following is the 2012 top 20 in the Race to the Championships and the top 20 ranked players in the world. Players must include points from the Grand Slams, Premier Mandatory tournaments, the Summer Olympic Games and the WTA Championships. For Top 20 players, their best two results at Premier 5 tournaments will also count. Gold backgrounds indicate players that qualified for the WTA Tour Championships. Blue backgrounds indicate players that qualified as alternates at the WTA Tour Championships.

Race Singles (as of October 22, 2012)
Rk	Player	Points	Tour
1	Victoria Azarenka (BLR)	10,190	19(18)
2	Maria Sharapova (RUS)	9,115	17(14)
3	Serena Williams (USA)	7,900	14(12)
4	Agnieszka Radwańska (POL)	7,095	23
5	Angelique Kerber (GER)	5,470	21
6	Petra Kvitová (CZE)	5,215	20(18)
7	Sara Errani (ITA)	4,855	23
8	Li Na (CHN)	4,726	18(17)
9	Samantha Stosur (AUS)	4,120	22
10	Marion Bartoli (FRA)	3,740	27
11	Caroline Wozniacki (DEN)	3,685	22
12	Ana Ivanovic (SRB)	2,900	20(19)
13	Nadia Petrova (RUS)	2,725	22
14	Dominika Cibulková (SVK)	2,495	27
15	Maria Kirilenko (RUS)	2,463	21
16	Roberta Vinci (ITA)	2,400	28
17	Lucie Šafářová (CZE)	2,125	24
18	Julia Görges (GER)	1,965	26
19	Kaia Kanepi (EST)	1,929	16
20	Ekaterina Makarova (RUS)	1,841	19

WTA Singles Year-End Rankings
#	Player	Points	#Trn	'11 Rk	High	Low	'11→'12
1	Victoria Azarenka (BLR)	10,595	18	3	1	3	▲2
2	Maria Sharapova (RUS)	10,045	17	4	1	4	▲2
3	Serena Williams (USA)	9,400	15	12	3	13	▲9
4	Agnieszka Radwańska (POL)	7,425	22	8	2	8	▲4
5	Angelique Kerber (GER)	5,550	21	32	5	32	▲27
6	Sara Errani (ITA)	5,100	23	45	6	48	▲39
7	Li Na (CHN)	5,095	18	5	5	11	▼2
8	Petra Kvitová (CZE)	5,085	20	2	2	8	▼6
9	Samantha Stosur (AUS)	4,135	23	6	5	9	▼3
10	Caroline Wozniacki (DEN)	3,765	23	1	1	11	▼9
11	Marion Bartoli (FRA)	3,740	25	9	7	11	▼2
12	Nadia Petrova (RUS)	3,040	22	29	12	35	▲17
13	Ana Ivanovic (SRB)	2,900	19	22	12	22	▲9
14	Maria Kirilenko (RUS)	2,540	22	28	12	29	▲14
15	Dominika Cibulková (SVK)	2,495	27	18	12	18	▲3
16	Roberta Vinci (ITA)	2,475	28	23	15	28	▲7
17	Lucie Šafářová (CZE)	2,125	24	25	17	28	▲8
18	Julia Görges (GER)	1,965	26	21	15	29	▲3
19	Kaia Kanepi (EST)	1,929	16	34	15	34	▲15
20	Ekaterina Makarova (RUS)	1,841	19	52	20	56	▲32

==== Number 1 ranking ====
Holder	Date gained	Date forfeited
Caroline Wozniacki (DEN)	Year-End 2011	29 January 2012
Victoria Azarenka (BLR)	30 January 2012	10 June 2012
Maria Sharapova (RUS)	11 June 2012	8 July 2012
Victoria Azarenka (BLR)	9 July 2012	Year-End 2012

=== Doubles ===
The following is the 2012 top 20 in the Race To The Championships – Doubles and the top 20 individual ranked doubles players. Gold backgrounds indicate teams that have qualified for WTA Tour Championships.

Race Doubles (as of October 22, 2012)
Rk	Team	Points	Tour
1	Sara Errani (ITA); Roberta Vinci (ITA)	10097	15
2	Andrea Hlaváčková (CZE); Lucie Hradecká (CZE)	7380	14
3	Liezel Huber (USA); Lisa Raymond (USA)	7036	19
4	Maria Kirilenko (RUS); Nadia Petrova (RUS)	5325	12
5	Raquel Kops-Jones (USA); Abigail Spears (USA)	5173	25
6	Elena Vesnina (RUS); Ekaterina Makarova (RUS)	4071	8
7	Nuria Llagostera Vives (ESP); María José Martínez Sánchez (ESP)	3737	9
8	Natalie Grandin (RSA); Vladimíra Uhlířová (CZE)	2576	31
9	Serena Williams (USA); Venus Williams (USA)	2280	2
10	Květa Peschke (CZE); Katarina Srebotnik (SLO)	2197	12

WTA Doubles Year-End Rankings
#	Player	Points	Change
1	Roberta Vinci (ITA)	10,030	▲25
2	Sara Errani (ITA)	10,030	▲25
3	Andrea Hlaváčková (CZE)	8,160	▲11
4	Lucie Hradecká (CZE)	8,160	▲11
5	Nadia Petrova (RUS)	7,065	▲8
6	Lisa Raymond (USA)	6,585	▼2
7	Maria Kirilenko (RUS)	6,550	=
8	Liezel Huber (USA)	6,510	▼7
9	Elena Vesnina (RUS)	6,120	▲1
10	Nuria Llagostera Vives (ESP)	5,540	▲22
11	Ekaterina Makarova (RUS)	5,170	▲46
12	Sania Mirza (IND)	4,415	▼1
13	Raquel Kops-Jones (USA)	4,300	▲24
14	Abigail Spears (USA)	4,300	▲22
15	María José Martínez Sánchez (ESP)	4,136	▲6
16	Katarina Srebotnik (SLO)	3,935	▼14
17	Květa Peschke (CZE)	3,590	▼15
18	Anna-Lena Grönefeld (GER)	3,165	▲35
19	Zheng Jie (CHN)	3,120	▲1
20	Barbora Záhlavová-Strýcová (CZE)	2,925	▲2

==== Number 1 ranking ====
Holder	Date gained	Date forfeited
Liezel Huber (USA)	Year-End 2011	
Liezel Huber (USA); Lisa Raymond (USA)	23 April 2012	9 September 2012
Sara Errani (ITA)	10 September 2012	14 October 2012
Roberta Vinci (ITA)	15 October 2012	Year-End 2012

== Prize money leaders ==
The 2012 WTA Tour season was the first, and still only, season where 3 different players earned at least $6,000,000. The 2014 and 2017 seasons each had 3 different players earned at least $5,000,000. The top-16 players earned over $1,000,000.

#	Player	Singles	Doubles	Mixed	Bonus Pool	Year-to-date
1	Victoria Azarenka (BLR)	$7,317,651	$7,130	$4,139	$600,000	$7,928,920
2	Serena Williams (USA)	$6,828,831	$214,725	$2,419	$0	$7,045,975
3	Maria Sharapova (RUS)	$6,308,296	$0	$0	$200,000	$6,508,296
4	Agnieszka Radwańska (POL)	$3,803,819	$47,723	$0	$250,000	$4,101,542
5	Sara Errani (ITA)	$2,181,948	$926,618	$2,070	$0	$3,110,636
6	Petra Kvitová (CZE)	$2,127,402	$5,473	$0	$600,000	$2,732,875
7	Caroline Wozniacki (DEN)	$1,408,240	$430	$0	$1,000,000	$2,408,670
8	Li Na (tennis) (CHN)	$1,880,646	$0	$0	$400,000	$2,280,646
9	Angelique Kerber (GER)	$1,938,436	$31,856	$2,070	$0	$1,972,362
10	Samantha Stosur (AUS)	$1,490,602	$45,582	$0	$400,000	$1,936,184
prize money given in US$; as of November 5, 2012

== Statistics leaders ==
as of November 12, 2012

Aces
	Player	Aces	Matches
1	(United States) Serena Williams	484	58
2	(Russia) Nadia Petrova	363	57
3	(Belarus) Victoria Azarenka	303	78
4	(Russia) Maria Sharapova	244	70
5	(Australia) Samantha Stosur	237	64
6	(Belgium) Kim Clijsters	230	62
7	(Germany) Mona Barthel	220	72
8	(Italy) Roberta Vinci	218	72
9	(Czech Republic) Petra Kvitová	207	57
10	(Romania) Sorana Cîrstea	190	57

Service games won
	Player	%	Matches
1	(United States) Serena Williams	87.5	58
2	(Belgium) Kim Clijsters	78.8	62
3	(Czech Republic) Petra Kvitová	75.3	57
4	(Russia) Maria Sharapova	75.2	70
5	(Belarus) Victoria Azarenka	75.0	78
6	(Australia) Samantha Stosur	74.9	64
7	(Russia) Nadia Petrova	74.5	57
8	(Czech Republic) Lucie Hradecká	73.1	35
9	(Czech Republic) Andrea Hlaváčková	73.0	22
10	(Czech Republic) Lucie Šafářová	72.5	48

Break points saved
	Player	%	Matches
1	(United States) Serena Williams	67.8	58
2	(Belgium) Kim Clijsters	64.7	62
3	(Czech Republic) Andrea Hlaváčková	63.5	22
4	(Russia) Maria Sharapova	61.5	70
5	(Czech Republic) Lucie Šafářová	61.3	48
6	(Australia) Samantha Stosur	60.4	64
7	(United States) Varvara Lepchenko	59.7	45
8	(China) Li Na	59.6	59
9	(Belarus) Victoria Azarenka	59.4	78
10	(Germany) Angelique Kerber	59.2	79

First serve percentage
	Player	%	Matches
1	(Italy) Sara Errani	76.3	72
2	(Germany) Andrea Petkovic	72.5	22
3	(Netherlands) Arantxa Rus	70.6	25
4	(Sweden) Sofia Arvidsson	69.0	47
5	(China) Zheng Jie	68.4	49
6	(China) Li Na	67.9	59
7	(Poland) Agnieszka Radwańska	67.9	78
8	(Belarus) Victoria Azarenka	67.7	78
9	(Austria) Patricia Mayr-Achleitner	67.5	21
10	(Romania) Irina-Camelia Begu	66.7	41

First service points won
	Player	%	Matches
1	(United States) Serena Williams	77.8	58
2	(Czech Republic) Lucie Hradecká	73.1	35
3	(Russia) Nadia Petrova	71.5	57
4	(Belgium) Kim Clijsters	70.3	62
5	(United States) Venus Williams	69.6	33
6	(Germany) Mona Barthel	69.2	52
7	(Estonia) Kaia Kanepi	69.1	34
8	(Czech Republic) Andrea Hlaváčková	69.0	22
9	(Serbia) Ana Ivanovic	68.9	54
10	(United Kingdom) Laura Robson	68.7	31

Second serve points won
	Player	%	Matches
1	(United States) Serena Williams	54.0	58
2	(Denmark) Caroline Wozniacki	50.7	71
3	(China) Li Na	50.4	59
4	(Russia) Ekaterina Makarova	50.2	45
5	(Russia) Svetlana Kuznetsova	49.9	25
6	(Japan) Misaki Doi	49.7	25
7	(Australia) Samantha Stosur	49.6	64
8	(United States) Varvara Lepchenko	49.4	45
9	(Czech Republic) Petra Kvitová	49.2	57
10	(Kazakhstan) Galina Voskoboeva	48.8	33

Points won returning 1st service
	Player	%	Matches
1	(Italy) Sara Errani	44.7	72
2	(France) Alizé Cornet	44.1	42
3	(Italy) Flavia Pennetta	42.7	35
4	(Czech Republic) Klára Zakopalová	42.4	44
5	(United States) Serena Williams	42.4	58
6	(Belarus) Victoria Azarenka	42.0	78
7	(Poland) Agnieszka Radwańska	41.4	78
8	(Russia) Maria Sharapova	41.4	70
9	(Slovakia) Dominika Cibulková	40.9	59
10	(Estonia) Kaia Kanepi	40.8	34

Break points converted
	Player	%	Matches
1	(Italy) Sara Errani	54.3	72
2	(Poland) Agnieszka Radwańska	54.2	78
3	(Belarus) Victoria Azarenka	53.5	78
4	(Netherlands) Arantxa Rus	51.7	25
5	(Australia) Casey Dellacqua	51.4	23
6	(Slovakia) Dominika Cibulková	51.3	59
7	(Netherlands) Kiki Bertens	50.9	23
8	(Estonia) Kaia Kanepi	50.7	34
9	(Slovakia) Magdaléna Rybáriková	50.5	29
10	(Russia) Maria Sharapova	50.3	70

Return games won
	Player	%	Matches
1	(Belarus) Victoria Azarenka	52.5	78
2	(Italy) Sara Errani	51.2	72
3	(Italy) Flavia Pennetta	48.0	35
4	(Poland) Agnieszka Radwańska	47.0	78
5	(Russia) Maria Sharapova	47.0	70
6	(United States) Serena Williams	46.8	58
7	(France) Mathilde Johansson	45.0	27
8	(Czech Republic) Klára Zakopalová	44.5	44
9	(Slovakia) Dominika Cibulková	44.5	59
10	(France) Alizé Cornet	43.9	42

== Points distribution ==
Category	W	F	SF	QF	R16	R32	R64	R128	Q	Q3	Q2	Q1
Grand Slam (S)	2000	1400	900	500	280	160	100	5	60	50	40	2
Grand Slam (D)	2000	1400	900	500	280	160	5	–	48	–	–	–
WTA Championships (S)	+450	+360	(230 for each win, 70 for each loss)									
WTA Championships (D)	1500	1050	690									
WTA Premier Mandatory (96S)	1000	700	450	250	140	80	50	5	30	–	20	1
WTA Premier Mandatory (64S)	1000	700	450	250	140	80	5	–	30	–	20	1
WTA Premier Mandatory (28/32D)	1000	700	450	250	140	5	–	–	–	–	–	–
WTA Premier 5 (56S)	900	620	395	225	125	70	1	–	30	–	20	1
WTA Premier 5 (28D)	900	620	395	225	125	1	–	–	–	–	–	–
Summer Olympic Games (64S)	685	470	340(3rd) 260(4th)	175	95	55	1	–	–	–	–	–
WTA Premier (56S)	470	320	200	120	60	40	1	–	12	–	8	1
WTA Premier (32S)	470	320	200	120	60	1	–	–	20	12	8	1
WTA Premier (16D)	470	320	200	120	1	–	–	–	–	–	–	–
Tournament of Champions	+195	+75	(60 for each win, 25 for each loss)									
WTA International (56S)	280	200	130	70	30	15	1	–	10	–	6	1
WTA International (32S)	280	200	130	70	30	1	–	–	16	10	6	1
WTA International (16D)	280	200	130	70	1	–	–	–	–	–	–	–

== Retirements ==
- (Russia) Vasilisa Bardina (born 30 November 1987, in Moscow) turned professional in 2003 with a high singles ranking career of No. 48 on 15 January 2007 and a high doubles ranking career of No. 117 on 25 June 2007.
- (Switzerland) Myriam Casanova (born 20 June 1985, in Altstätten) turned professional in 2000 with a high singles ranking career of No. 45 on 7 April 2003 and a high doubles ranking career of No. 19 on 5 July 2004.
- (Belgium) Kim Clijsters (born 8 July 1983, in Bilzen) turned professional in 1997, reaching career-high rankings of World No. 1 in Singles and Doubles. Clijsters has won 41 WTA singles titles and 11 WTA doubles titles. She has won four Grand Slam singles titles: three at the US Open, in 2005, 2009, and 2010 and one at the Australian Open in 2011. She has also been runner-up in four Grand Slam singles tournaments, and won the WTA Tour Championships singles title in 2002, 2003, and 2010. In doubles, she won the French Open and Wimbledon titles in 2003. Clijsters has retired once on 6 May 2007, but almost two years later, on 26 March 2009, she publicly declared her intent to return to the WTA tour for the 2009 summer hard court season. In only her third tournament back, she won her second US Open title, becoming the first unseeded player and wildcard to win the tournament, and the first mother to win a major since Evonne Goolagong in 1980. Clijsters announced in May that her second retirement would occur after the completion of the 2012 US Open
- (United States) Julie Ditty (born 4 January 1979, in Atlanta) turned professional in 2002 with a high singles ranking career of No. 89 on 24 March 2008 and a high doubles ranking career of No. 66 on 3 August 2009.
- (Argentina) Gisela Dulko (born January 30, 1985, in Buenos Aires) was a former world no. 1 in doubles turned professional in 2001. Dulko has won 4 WTA singles titles and 17 WTA doubles titles. Dulko won the 2010 WTA Tour Championships and the 2011 Australian Open in doubles, enjoying an 11-year career before announcing her retirement in November 2012.
- (United States) Ashley Harkleroad (born 2 May 1985, in Rossville) turned professional in 2000 with a high singles ranking career of No. 39 on 9 June 2003 and a high doubles ranking career of No. 39 on 27 January 2007.
- (Bulgaria) Svetlana Krivencheva (born 30 December 1973 in Plovdiv) turned professional in 1991 with a high doubles ranking career of No. 69 on 3 August 1998.
- (United States) Courtney Nagle (born 29 September 1982) turned professional in 2005 with a high doubles ranking career of No. 97 on 20 April 2009.
- (France) Olivia Sanchez (born 17 November 1982 in Paris) turned professional in 1998 with a high singles ranking career of No. 90 on 9 June 2008.
- (Turkey) İpek Şenoğlu (born 8 June 1979 in Eskişehir) turned professional in 1996 with a high doubles ranking career of No. 53 on 19 October 2009.
- (Czech Republic) Olga Vymetálková (born 24 January 1976) turned professional in 1994 with a high doubles ranking career of No. 82 on 13 September 2004.
- (United States) Mashona Washington (born 31 May 1976, in Flint) turned professional in 1995 with a high singles ranking career of No. 50 on 8 November 2004 and a high doubles ranking career of No. 55 on 18 July 2005.
- (Germany) Jasmin Wöhr (born 21 August 1980 in Tübingen) turned professional in 1999 with a high doubles ranking career of No. 46 on 23 July 2007.

== Comeback ==
Following are notable players who will comeback after retirements during the 2012 WTA Tour season:

- (Argentina) Paola Suárez (born June 23, 1976, in Buenos Aires), who turned professional in 1991 and has reached a career high ranking of No. 9 on 7 June 2004 in singles and in doubles she was a former world no. 1. She has won 8 doubles Grand Slam (with Virginia Ruano Pascual), 4 singles titles, 44 WTA Tour doubles including 1 WTA Championships. She returned from retirement in 2012, partnering with Gisela Dulko at the 2012 Copa Sony Ericsson Colsanitas, but they lost in the first round. The pair played at the London Summer Olympic Games, where they also lost in the first round.

== Awards ==
The winners of the 2012 WTA Awards were announced throughout the last week of November.

- Player of the Year – (United States) Serena Williams
- Doubles Team of the Year – (Italy) Sara Errani & (Italy) Roberta Vinci
- Most Improved Player – (Italy) Sara Errani
- Comeback Player of the Year – (Kazakhstan) Yaroslava Shvedova
- Newcomer of the Year – (United Kingdom) Laura Robson
- Karen Krantzcke Sportsmanship Award – (Belgium) Kim Clijsters
- Player Service Award – (United States) Venus Williams
- Diamond Aces – (Belarus) Victoria Azarenka
- Fan Favorite Singles Player – (Poland) Agnieszka Radwańska
- Fan Favorite Doubles Team – (United States) Serena Williams & (United States) Venus Williams
- Fan Favorite Twitter – (Denmark) Caroline Wozniacki (Twitter account)
- Fan Favorite Facebook – (Poland) Agnieszka Radwańska (Facebook account)
- Fan Favorite Video – Agnieszka Radwańska & The Bee (video)
- Favorite Premier Tournament – (Germany) Porsche Tennis Grand Prix (Stuttgart)
- Favorite International Tournament – (Sweden) Sony Swedish Open (Båstad)

== See also ==
- 2012 ATP World Tour
- 2012 ATP Challenger Tour
- 2012 ITF Men's Circuit
- 2012 WTA 125s
- 2012 ITF Women's Circuit
- Women's Tennis Association
- International Tennis Federation

== Notes ==
- ^{a} Zheng Jie won the final after Flavia Pennetta was forced to retire because of a low back injury.
- ^{b} Hsieh Su-wei won the final after Petra Martić was forced to retire because of fatigue and cramping.
