= List of Slovakia Fed Cup team representatives =

This is a list of tennis players who have represented the Slovakia Fed Cup team in an official Fed Cup match. Slovakia have taken part in the competition since 1994. Slovak players previously competed as part of the Czechoslovak team.

== Players ==
Player	W-L (Total)	W-L (Singles)	W-L (Doubles)	Ties	Debut
Jana Čepelová	8 – 9	4 – 6	4 – 3	11	2011
Ľudmila Cervanová	3 – 4	1 – 4	2 – 0	3	1999
Dominika Cibulková	21 – 19	20 – 11	1 – 8	21	2005
Eva Fislová	0 – 3	0 – 1	0 – 2	3	2003
Jarmila Gajdošová	0 – 1	-	0 – 1	1	2003
Karina Habšudová	26 – 14	18 – 9	8 – 5	21	1994
Daniela Hantuchová	38 – 20	32 – 14	6 – 6	32	1999
Stanislava Hrozenská	0 – 1	-	0 – 1	1	2005
Janette Husárová	17 – 12	6 – 6	11 – 6	23	1994
Jana Juricová	1 – 0	-	1 – 0	1	2007
Kristína Kučová	1 – 5	1 – 3	0 – 2	5	2008
Ľubomíra Kurhajcová	4 – 5	4 – 3	0 – 2	5	2003
Viktória Kužmová	3 – 2	3 – 1	0 – 1	2	2018
Tereza Mihalíková	0 – 1	-	0 – 1	1	2016
Henrieta Nagyová	18 – 6	15 – 5	3 – 1	14	1995
Magdaléna Rybáriková	15 – 11	8 – 7	7 – 4	19	2005
Anna Karolína Schmiedlová	8 – 7	5 – 4	3 – 3	9	2012
Kristína Schmiedlová	0 – 1	-	0 – 1	1	2015
Rebecca Šramková	3 – 2	2 – 1	1 – 1	2	2017
Katarína Studeníková	3 – 3	2 – 1	1 – 2	5	1994
Martina Suchá	3 – 2	3 – 2	-	4	2002
Denisa Krajčovičová	1 – 0	-	1 – 0	1	1995
Lenka Wienerová	1 – 1	0 – 1	1 – 0	1	2009
Radka Zrubáková	10 – 4	6 – 2	4 – 2	10	1994
