= 2012 Bank of the West Classic =

- Date: July 9–15
- Edition: 41st
- Category: WTA Premier
- Prize money: $740,000
- Surface: Hard
- Location: Stanford, United States

Champions

Singles
- (United States) Serena Williams

Doubles
- (New Zealand) Marina Erakovic / (United Kingdom) Heather Watson
| ← 2011 · | Stanford Classic | · 2013 → |

The 2012 Bank of the West Classic was a professional tennis tournament played on hard courts. It was the 41st edition of the tournament which was part of the WTA Premier tournaments category of the 2012 WTA Tour. It took place in Stanford, United States, on July 9–15, 2012. It was the first event of the 2012 US Open Series.

== Singles entrants ==
=== Seeds ===
| Country | Player | Rank^{1} | Seed |
|---|---|---|---|
| USA | Serena Williams | 6 | 1 |
| FRA | Marion Bartoli | 9 | 2 |
| SVK | Dominika Cibulková | 13 | 3 |
| SRB | Jelena Janković | 21 | 4 |
| BEL | Yanina Wickmayer | 36 | 5 |
| RSA | Chanelle Scheepers | 43 | 6 |
| CRO | ~~Petra Martić~~ | 45 | 7 |
| NZL | Marina Erakovic | 49 | 8 |
| ROU | Sorana Cîrstea | 52 | 9 |

- ^{1} Rankings as of June 25, 2012

=== Other entrants ===
The following players received wildcards into the singles main draw:

- (United States) Mallory Burdette
- (United States) Nicole Gibbs
- (Portugal) Michelle Larcher de Brito

The following players received entry from the qualifying draw:

- (Slovakia) Jana Juricová
- (Thailand) Noppawan Lertcheewakarn
- (United States) Grace Min
- (Japan) Erika Sema

The following players received entry into the singles main draw as lucky losers:

- (United States) Alexa Glatch
- (United States) Coco Vandeweghe
- (China) Zheng Saisai

=== Withdrawals ===
- (Canada) Stéphanie Dubois (foot injury)
- (Slovakia) Daniela Hantuchová
- (Croatia) Petra Martić
- (United States) Christina McHale
- (Serbia) Bojana Jovanovski
- (Germany) Angelique Kerber
- (Russia) Nadia Petrova
- (China) Peng Shuai

=== Retirements ===
- (Japan) Ayumi Morita (low back injury)

== Doubles entrants ==
=== Seeds ===
| Country | Player | Country | Player | Rank^{1} | Seed |
|---|---|---|---|---|---|
| AUS | Jarmila Gajdošová | USA | Vania King | 45 | 1 |
| USA | Raquel Kops-Jones | USA | Abigail Spears | 49 | 2 |
| RSA | Natalie Grandin | CZE | Vladimíra Uhlířová | 55 | 3 |
| TPE | Chan Hao-ching | TPE | Chan Yung-jan | 128 | 4 |

- ^{1} Rankings as of June 25, 2012

=== Other entrants ===
The following pairs received wildcards into the doubles main draw:

- (United States) Mallory Burdette / (United States) Nicole Gibbs
- (United States) Simone Kalhorn / (United States) Alessondra Parra

=== Retirements ===
- (Poland) Urszula Radwańska (heat illness)

== Finals ==
=== Singles ===
- (United States) Serena Williams defeated (United States) Coco Vandeweghe 7–5, 6–3

=== Doubles ===
- (New Zealand) Marina Erakovic / (United Kingdom) Heather Watson defeated (Australia) Jarmila Gajdošová / (United States) Vania King 7–5, 7–6^{(9–7)}
