= 2012 New Haven Open at Yale =

- Date: August 17–25
- Edition: 44th
- Category: WTA Premier
- Draw: 30S / 16D
- Surface: Hard / outdoor
- Location: New Haven, United States
- Venue: Cullman-Heyman Tennis Center

Champions

Singles
- (Czech Republic) Petra Kvitová

Doubles
- (United States) Liezel Huber / (United States) Lisa Raymond
← 2011 ·	New Haven Open at Yale	· 2013 →

The 2012 New Haven Open at Yale (New Haven Open at Yale presented by First Niagara for sponsorship reasons) was a women's tennis tournament played on outdoor hard courts. It was the 44th edition of the New Haven Open at Yale, and was part of the Premier Series of the 2012 WTA Tour. It took place at the Cullman-Heyman Tennis Center in New Haven, Connecticut, United States, from August 17 through August 25, 2012. It was the last event on the 2012 US Open Series before the 2012 US Open.

== Singles main-draw entrants ==
=== Seeds ===
Country	Player	Ranking*	Seed
POL	Agnieszka Radwańska	3	1
CZE	Petra Kvitová	5	2
DEN	Caroline Wozniacki	8	3
ITA	Sara Errani	10	4
FRA	Marion Bartoli	11	5
SVK	Dominika Cibulková	13	6
RUS	Maria Kirilenko	14	7
CZE	Lucie Šafářová	19	8

- Seedings are based on the rankings of August 13, 2012

=== Other entrants ===
The following players received wildcards into the singles main draw:

- (Czech Republic) Petra Kvitová
- (United States) Bethanie Mattek-Sands
- (United Kingdom) Laura Robson

The following players received entry from the qualifying draw:

- (Hungary) Tímea Babos
- (United States) Nicole Gibbs
- (United States) Alexa Glatch
- (Belarus) Olga Govortsova

The following players entry as lucky loser:

- (Russia) Vera Dushevina
- (United States) Melanie Oudin

=== Withdrawals ===
The following players withdrew from the singles main draw:

- (Estonia) Kaia Kanepi (achilles tendon injury)
- (United States) Christina McHale (gastrointestinal illness)
- (Russia) Anastasia Pavlyuchenkova
- (Italy) Flavia Pennetta (wrist injury)
- (Italy) Francesca Schiavone (gastrointestinal illness)

=== Retirements ===
- (Germany) Mona Barthel (gastrointestinal illness)
- (United States) Varvara Lepchenko (wrist injury)
- (Poland) Agnieszka Radwańska (right shoulder injury)
- (Denmark) Caroline Wozniacki (right knee injury)

== Doubles main-draw entrants ==
=== Seeds ===
Country	Player	Country	Player	Rank^{1}	Seed
USA	Liezel Huber	USA	Lisa Raymond	2	1
CZE	Andrea Hlaváčková	CZE	Lucie Hradecká	21	2
SLO	Katarina Srebotnik	CHN	Zheng Jie	38	3
ESP	Nuria Llagostera Vives	ESP	María José Martínez Sánchez	38	4

- ^{1} Rankings are as of August 13, 2012

=== Other entrants ===
The following pair received wildcard into the doubles main draw:

- (Hungary) Tímea Babos / (United States) Sloane Stephens

The following pair received entry as alternates:

- (Spain) Sílvia Soler Espinosa / (Spain) Carla Suárez Navarro

=== Withdrawals ===
- (Argentina) Paola Suárez (low back injury)

== Finals ==
=== Singles ===
(Czech Republic) Petra Kvitová defeated (Russia) Maria Kirilenko, 7–6^{(11–9)}, 7–5

=== Doubles ===
(United States) Liezel Huber / (United States) Lisa Raymond defeated (Czech Republic) Andrea Hlaváčková / (Czech Republic) Lucie Hradecká, 4–6, 6–0, [10–4]
