= 2012 Bank of the West Classic – Singles =

Singles
- 2012 Bank of the West Classic

Final
- Champion: (United States) Serena Williams
- Runner-up: (United States) CoCo Vandeweghe
- Score: 7–5, 6–3

Details
- Draw: 28
- Seeds: 8

Events
Singles	Doubles
- Bank of the West Classic

Serena Williams was the reigning champion, and successfully defended her title, defeating lucky loser CoCo Vandeweghe in the final, 7–5, 6–3. It was the first all-American final on the WTA Tour since the 2009 WTA Tour Championships and the first on American soil since Los Angeles in 2004.

== Seeds ==
The top four seeds received a bye into the second round.

1. (United States) Serena Williams (champion)
2. (France) Marion Bartoli (quarterfinals)
3. (Slovakia) Dominika Cibulková (quarterfinals)
4. (Serbia) Jelena Janković (second round)
5. (Belgium) Yanina Wickmayer (semifinals)
6. (South Africa) Chanelle Scheepers (quarterfinals)
7. (Croatia) ~~Petra Martić~~ (withdrew)
8. (New Zealand) Marina Erakovic (second round)
9. (Romania) Sorana Cîrstea (semifinals)

== Draw ==
Key

- Q = Qualifier
- WC = Wild card
- LL = Lucky loser
- Alt = Alternate
- ITF = ITF entry
- PR = Protected ranking
- SR = Special ranking
- SE = Special exempt
- JE = Junior exempt
- JR = Junior Accelerator Programme entrant
- CO = College Accelerator Programme entrant
- NG = Next Gen Accelerator Program entrant
- w/o = Walkover
- r = Retired
- d = Defaulted

=== Finals ===
Semifinals
1	(United States) Serena Williams	6	6
9	(Romania) Sorana Cîrstea	1	2
LL	(United States) CoCo Vandeweghe	6	3	6
5	(Belgium) Yanina Wickmayer	2	6	2

Final
1	(United States) Serena Williams	7	6
LL	(United States) CoCo Vandeweghe	5	3

=== Top half ===
First round
WC	(United States) N Gibbs	6	6
Q	(Thailand) N Lertcheewakarn	4	4
WC	(Portugal) M Larcher de Brito	5	6	6
(Australia) J Gajdošová	7	2	3
Q	(United States) G Min	4	4
6	(South Africa) C Scheepers	6	6
Q	(Japan) E Sema	6	6
LL	(United States) A Glatch	2	3
(Japan) A Morita	2^{r}
LL	(China) S Zheng	4
(United States) V King	5	4
9	(Romania) S Cîrstea	7	6

Second round
1	(United States) S Williams	6	6
WC	(United States) N Gibbs	2	1
WC	(Portugal) M Larcher de Brito	3	4
6	(South Africa) C Scheepers	6	6
3	(Slovakia) D Cibulková	6	6
Q	(Japan) E Sema	1	3
LL	(China) S Zheng	3	3
9	(Romania) S Cîrstea	6	6

Quarterfinals
1	(United States) S Williams	6	6
6	(South Africa) C Scheepers	4	0
3	(Slovakia) D Cibulková	7^{7}	2	0
9	(Romania) S Cîrstea	6^{5}	6	6

Semifinals
1	(United States) S Williams	6	6
9	(Romania) S Cîrstea	1	2

=== Bottom half ===
First round
8	(New Zealand) M Erakovic	6	6
Q	(Slovakia) J Juricová	2	2
(Greece) E Daniilidou	6	3	4
(Poland) U Radwańska	3	6	6
(Hungary) M Czink	4	1
LL	(United States) C Vandeweghe	6	6
5	(Belgium) Y Wickmayer	7	2	7
(Chinese Taipei) K-c Chang	5	6	5
(United States) S Stephens	6^{5}	6	1
(United Kingdom) H Watson	7^{7}	4	6
WC	(United States) M Burdette	2	7	6
(United Kingdom) A Keothavong	6	5	4

Second round
8	(New Zealand) M Erakovic	3	6	4
(Poland) U Radwańska	6	3	6
LL	(United States) C Vandeweghe	6	6
4	(Serbia) J Janković	4	2
5	(Belgium) Y Wickmayer	5	6	6
(United Kingdom) H Watson	7	1	4
WC	(United States) M Burdette	5	0
2	(France) M Bartoli	7	6

Quarterfinals
(Poland) U Radwańska	4	4
LL	(United States) C Vandeweghe	6	6
5	(Belgium) Y Wickmayer	6	6
2	(France) M Bartoli	3	2

Semifinals
LL	(United States) C Vandeweghe	6	3	6
5	(Belgium) Y Wickmayer	2	6	2

== Qualifying ==
=== Seeds ===
1. (Kazakhstan) Sesil Karatantcheva (first round)
2. (United States) CoCo Vandeweghe (qualifying competition, lucky loser)
3. (Japan) Erika Sema (qualified)
4. (United States) Alexa Glatch (qualifying competition, lucky loser)
5. (Thailand) Noppawan Lertcheewakarn (qualified)
6. (Chinese Taipei) Chan Yung-jan (first round)
7. (United States) Grace Min (qualified)
8. (China) Zheng Saisai (qualifying competition, lucky loser)

=== Qualifiers ===
1. (United States) Grace Min
2. (Thailand) Noppawan Lertcheewakarn
3. (Japan) Erika Sema
4. (Slovakia) Jana Juricová

=== Lucky losers ===
1. (United States) Alexa Glatch
2. (United States) CoCo Vandeweghe
3. (China) Zheng Saisai

=== Draw ===
==== First qualifier ====
First round
1	(Kazakhstan) Sesil Karatantcheva	3	5
(United States) Abigail Spears	6	7
WC	(United States) Alessondra Parra	2	0
7	(United States) Grace Min	6	6

Qualifying competition
(United States) Abigail Spears	7^{7}	2	4
7	(United States) Grace Min	6^{2}	6	6

==== Second qualifier ====
First round
2	(United States) CoCo Vandeweghe	6	6
WC	(United States) Simone Kalhorn	2	2
WC	(United States) Ellen Tsay	6	4	2
5	(Thailand) Noppawan Lertcheewakarn	3	6	6

Qualifying competition
2	(United States) CoCo Vandeweghe	6	2	5
5	(Thailand) Noppawan Lertcheewakarn	2	6	7

==== Third qualifier ====
First round
3	(Japan) Erika Sema	6	6
WC	(United States) Kristie Ahn	4	4
(Czech Republic) Vladimíra Uhlířová	2	2
8	(China) Zheng Saisai	6	6

Qualifying competition
3	(Japan) Erika Sema	6	6
8	(China) Zheng Saisai	3	3

==== Fourth qualifier ====
First round
4	(United States) Alexa Glatch	6	1	7^{7}
(United States) Raquel Kops-Jones	1	6	6^{5}
WC	(Slovakia) Jana Juricová	3	6	6
6	(Chinese Taipei) Chan Yung-jan	6	1	2

Qualifying competition
4	(United States) Alexa Glatch	4	6	2
WC	(Slovakia) Jana Juricová	6	2	6
