= 2012 Bank of the West Classic – Doubles =

Doubles
- 2012 Bank of the West Classic

Final
- Champions: (New Zealand) Marina Erakovic (United Kingdom) Heather Watson
- Runners-up: (Australia) Jarmila Gajdošová (United States) Vania King
- Score: 7–5, 7–6^{(9–7)}

Details
- Draw: 15
- Seeds: 4

Events
Singles	Doubles
← 2011 ·	Bank of the West Classic	· 2013 →

Victoria Azarenka and Maria Kirilenko were the defending champions, but both decided not to participate.

Marina Erakovic and Heather Watson won the title, defeating Jarmila Gajdošová and Vania King in the final, 7–5, 7–6^{(9–7)}.

== Seeds ==
The top seeds received a bye into the quarterfinals.

1. (Australia) Jarmila Gajdošová / (United States) Vania King (final)
2. (United States) Raquel Kops-Jones / (United States) Abigail Spears (quarterfinals)
3. (South Africa) Natalie Grandin / (Czech Republic) Vladimíra Uhlířová (semifinals)
4. (Chinese Taipei) Chan Hao-ching / (Chinese Taipei) Chan Yung-jan (semifinals)

== Draw ==
=== Key ===
- Q = Qualifier
- WC = Wild card
- LL = Lucky loser
- Alt = Alternate
- SE = Special exempt
- PR = Protected ranking
- ITF = ITF entry
- JE = Junior exempt
- w/o = Walkover
- r = Retired
- d = Defaulted
- SR = Special ranking

=== Draw ===
First round
(United States) A Glatch (China) S Zheng	6	4	[6]
(Romania) S Cîrstea (United Kingdom) A Keothavong	4	6	[10]
4	(Chinese Taipei) H-c Chan (Chinese Taipei) Y-j Chan	6	6
WC	(United States) S Kalhorn (United States) A Parra	0	0
(Slovakia) D Cibulková (Slovakia) J Husárová	6	6
(Latvia) L Dekmeijere (Thailand) N Lertcheewakarn	3	3
(Greece) E Daniilidou (Poland) U Radwańska	6^{4}	6	[10]
(United States) L Lee-Waters (United States) M Moulton-Levy	7^{7}	4	[2]
WC	(United States) M Burdette (United States) N Gibbs	6^{5}	6	[6]
3	(South Africa) N Grandin (Czech Republic) V Uhlířová	7^{7}	3	[10]
(Kazakhstan) S Karatantcheva (Japan) E Sema	3	6	[5]
(New Zealand) M Erakovic (United Kingdom) H Watson	6	3	[10]
(Chinese Taipei) K-c Chang (South Africa) C Scheepers	3	5
2	(United States) R Kops-Jones (United States) A Spears	6	7

Quarterfinals
1	(Australia) J Gajdošová (United States) V King	6	6
(Romania) S Cîrstea (United Kingdom) A Keothavong	2	2
4	(Chinese Taipei) H-c Chan (Chinese Taipei) Y-j Chan	6	6
(Slovakia) D Cibulková (Slovakia) J Husárová	4	3
(Greece) E Daniilidou (Poland) U Radwańska
3	(South Africa) N Grandin (Czech Republic) V Uhlířová	w/o
(New Zealand) M Erakovic (United Kingdom) H Watson	7^{11}	2	[10]
2	(United States) R Kops-Jones (United States) A Spears	6^{9}	6	[4]

Semifinals
1	(Australia) J Gajdošová (United States) V King	6	6
4	(Chinese Taipei) H-c Chan (Chinese Taipei) Y-j Chan	3	3
3	(South Africa) N Grandin (Czech Republic) V Uhlířová	5	7^{8}	[7]
(New Zealand) M Erakovic (United Kingdom) H Watson	7	6^{6}	[10]

Final
1	(Australia) J Gajdošová (United States) V King	5	6^{7}
(New Zealand) M Erakovic (United Kingdom) H Watson	7	7^{9}
