= 2012 New Haven Open at Yale – Singles =

Singles
- 2012 New Haven Open at Yale

Final
- Champion: (Czech Republic) Petra Kvitová
- Runner-up: (Russia) Maria Kirilenko
- Score: 7–6^{(11–9)}, 7–5

Details
- Draw: 30
- Seeds: 8

Events
Singles	Doubles
- New Haven Open at Yale

Caroline Wozniacki was the four-time defending champion. She retired due to a knee injury in the semifinals against Maria Kirilenko.

Petra Kvitová defeated Kirilenko 7–6^{(11–9)}, 7–5 in the final.

== Seeds ==
The top two seeds receive a bye into the second round.

1. (Poland) Agnieszka Radwańska (second round, retired because of a right shoulder injury)
2. (Czech Republic) Petra Kvitová (champion)
3. (Denmark) Caroline Wozniacki (semifinals, retired)
4. (Italy) Sara Errani (semifinals)
5. (France) Marion Bartoli (quarterfinals)
6. (Slovakia) Dominika Cibulková (quarterfinals)
7. (Russia) Maria Kirilenko (final)
8. (Czech Republic) Lucie Šafářová (quarterfinals)

== Draw ==
Key

- Q = Qualifier
- WC = Wild card
- LL = Lucky loser
- Alt = Alternate
- ITF = ITF entry
- PR = Protected ranking
- SR = Special ranking
- SE = Special exempt
- JE = Junior exempt
- JR = Junior Accelerator Programme entrant
- CO = College Accelerator Programme entrant
- NG = Next Gen Accelerator Program entrant
- w/o = Walkover
- r = Retired
- d = Defaulted

=== Finals ===
Semifinals
7	(Russia) Maria Kirilenko	7
3	(Denmark) Caroline Wozniacki	5^{r}
4	(Italy) Sara Errani	1	3
2/WC	(Czech Republic) Petra Kvitová	6	6

Final
7	(Russia) Maria Kirilenko	6^{9}	5
2/WC	(Czech Republic) Petra Kvitová	7^{11}	7

=== Top half ===
First round
LL	(Russia) V Dushevina	7^{7}	4	2
Q	(Belarus) O Govortsova	6^{5}	6	6
(Slovakia) D Hantuchová	3	5
(Germany) M Barthel	6	7
(Israel) S Pe'er	2	2
7	(Russia) M Kirilenko	6	6
3	(Denmark) C Wozniacki	6	6
(Russia) E Makarova	3	3
LL	(United States) M Oudin	4	1
(Sweden) S Arvidsson	6	6
Q	(Hungary) T Babos	3	7	5
(Germany) A Petkovic	6	5	7
(Spain) A Medina Garrigues	5	3
6	(Slovakia) D Cibulková	7	6

Second round
1	(Poland) A Radwańska	0	1^{r}
Q	(Belarus) O Govortsova	6	2
(Germany) M Barthel
7	(Russia) M Kirilenko	w/o
3	(Denmark) C Wozniacki	7^{7}	6
(Sweden) S Arvidsson	6^{4}	2
(Germany) A Petkovic	4	1
6	(Slovakia) D Cibulková	6	6

Quarterfinals
Q	(Belarus) O Govortsova	1	2
7	(Russia) M Kirilenko	6	6
3	(Denmark) C Wozniacki	6	6
6	(Slovakia) D Cibulková	2	1

Semifinals
7	(Russia) M Kirilenko	7
3	(Denmark) C Wozniacki	5^{r}

=== Bottom half ===
First round
5	(France) M Bartoli	6	6
WC	(United Kingdom) L Robson	3	3
(United States) S Stephens	6	6
(Austria) T Paszek	3	1
PR	(Hungary) Á Szávay	6^{3}	4
(Spain) C Suárez Navarro	7^{7}	6
WC	(United States) B Mattek-Sands	4	5
4	(Italy) S Errani	6	7
8	(Czech Republic) L Šafářová	6	4
(United States) V Lepchenko	3	1^{r}
(Bulgaria) T Pironkova	5	2
(China) J Zheng	7	6
Q	(United States) N Gibbs	6	1	6
Q	(United States) A Glatch	4	6	4

Second round
5	(France) M Bartoli	6	0	6
(United States) S Stephens	1	6	3
(Spain) C Suárez Navarro	4	3
4	(Italy) S Errani	6	6
8	(Czech Republic) L Šafářová	6	6
(China) J Zheng	4	0
Q	(United States) N Gibbs	2	4
2/WC	(Czech Republic) P Kvitová	6	6

Quarterfinals
5	(France) M Bartoli	4	2
4	(Italy) S Errani	6	6
8	(Czech Republic) L Šafářová	3	3
2/WC	(Czech Republic) P Kvitová	6	6

Semifinals
4	(Italy) S Errani	1	3
2/WC	(Czech Republic) P Kvitová	6	6

== Qualifying ==
=== Seeds ===
1. (Hungary) Tímea Babos (qualified)
2. (Czech Republic) Lucie Hradecká (withdrew because of her qualification for the Cincinnati doubles final)
3. (France) Mathilde Johansson (first round)
4. (Spain) Lourdes Domínguez Lino (second round)
5. (Belarus) Olga Govortsova (qualified)
6. (Italy) Camila Giorgi (first round)
7. (Spain) Garbiñe Muguruza (qualifying competition, retired)
8. (Ukraine) Kateryna Bondarenko (first round)

=== Qualifiers ===
1. (Hungary) Tímea Babos
2. (Belarus) Olga Govortsova
3. (United States) Alexa Glatch
4. (United States) Nicole Gibbs

=== Lucky losers ===
1. (Russia) Vera Dushevina
2. (United States) Melanie Oudin

=== Draw ===
==== First qualifier ====
First round
1	(Hungary) Tímea Babos	5	6	6
(Russia) Alla Kudryavtseva	7	3	4
(Brazil) Teliana Pereira	2	7^{8}	4
(Uzbekistan) Akgul Amanmuradova	6	6^{6}	6
WC	(United States) Lauren Embree	2	4
WC	(United States) Sachia Vickery	6	6
(Australia) Anastasia Rodionova	7^{7}	6
8	(Ukraine) Kateryna Bondarenko	6^{4}	2

Second round
1	(Hungary) Tímea Babos	6	6
(Uzbekistan) Akgul Amanmuradova	3	4
WC	(United States) Sachia Vickery	6	0
(Australia) Anastasia Rodionova	3	0^{r}

Qualifying competition
1	(Hungary) Tímea Babos	2	6	6
WC	(United States) Sachia Vickery	6	4	4

==== Second qualifier ====
First round
Alt	(Czech Republic) Vladimíra Uhlířová	4	1
(Colombia) Catalina Castaño	6	6
(Russia) Vera Dushevina	7	7
(Japan) Kimiko Date-Krumm	5	5
(Ukraine) Olga Savchuk	7^{7}	7
(Spain) Estrella Cabeza Candela	6^{5}	5
(Hungary) Gréta Arn	2	0
5	(Belarus) Olga Govortsova	6	6

Second round
(Colombia) Catalina Castaño	6	0	3
(Russia) Vera Dushevina	4	6	6
(Ukraine) Olga Savchuk	0	3
5	(Belarus) Olga Govortsova	6	6

Qualifying competition
(Russia) Vera Dushevina	7	2	5
5	(Belarus) Olga Govortsova	5	6	7

==== Third qualifier ====
First round
3	(France) Mathilde Johansson	2	4
WC	(Spain) Sílvia Soler Espinosa	6	6
(Czech Republic) Eva Birnerová	2^{r}
(United States) Melanie Oudin	3
(United States) Chieh-Yu Hsu	6	6
(United States) Lena Litvak	3	2
(United States) Alexa Glatch	6	7
6	(Italy) Camila Giorgi	2	5

Second round
WC	(Spain) Sílvia Soler Espinosa	6	4	3
(United States) Melanie Oudin	2	6	6
(United States) Chieh-Yu Hsu	1	4
(United States) Alexa Glatch	6	6

Qualifying competition
(United States) Melanie Oudin	0	2
(United States) Alexa Glatch	6	6

==== Fourth qualifier ====
First round
4	(Spain) Lourdes Domínguez Lino	3	6	6
(Belarus) Anastasiya Yakimova	6	3	1
(Argentina) Paula Ormaechea	2	3
WC	(United States) Nicole Gibbs	6	6
(United States) Julia Cohen	3	4
(Spain) Lara Arruabarrena Vecino	6	6
Alt	(South Africa) Natalie Grandin	3	2
7	(Spain) Garbiñe Muguruza	6	6

Second round
4	(Spain) Lourdes Domínguez Lino	3	3
WC	(United States) Nicole Gibbs	6	6
(Spain) Lara Arruabarrena Vecino	6	5	2
7	(Spain) Garbiñe Muguruza	2	7	6

Qualifying competition
WC	(United States) Nicole Gibbs	6	1
7	(Spain) Garbiñe Muguruza	2	0^{r}
