= 2012 New Haven Open at Yale – Doubles =

Doubles
- 2012 New Haven Open at Yale

Final
- Champions: (United States) Liezel Huber (United States) Lisa Raymond
- Runners-up: (Czech Republic) Andrea Hlaváčková (Czech Republic) Lucie Hradecká
- Score: 4–6, 6–0, [10–4]

Events
Singles	Doubles
← 2011 ·	New Haven Open at Yale	· 2013 →

Chuang Chia-jung and Olga Govortsova were the defending champions, but decided not to defend their title together.
Chuang partnered with Shahar Pe'er and lost in the Quarterfinals to Liezel Huber and Lisa Raymond. Govortsova played alongside Vera Dushevina, but lost in the first round to Liezel Huber and Lisa Raymond.
Huber and Raymond won the final against Andrea Hlaváčková and Lucie Hradecká 4–6, 6–0, [10–4].

== Seeds ==
1. (United States) Liezel Huber / (United States) Lisa Raymond (champions)
2. (Czech Republic) Andrea Hlaváčková / (Czech Republic) Lucie Hradecká (final)
3. (Slovenia) Katarina Srebotnik / (China) Zheng Jie (semifinals)
4. (Spain) Nuria Llagostera Vives / (Spain) María José Martínez Sánchez (quarterfinals)

== Draw ==
=== Key ===
- Q = Qualifier
- WC = Wild card
- LL = Lucky loser
- Alt = Alternate
- SE = Special exempt
- PR = Protected ranking
- ITF = ITF entry
- JE = Junior exempt
- w/o = Walkover
- r = Retired
- d = Defaulted
- SR = Special ranking

=== Draw ===
First round
1	(United States) L Huber (United States) L Raymond	6	7
(Russia) V Dushevina (Belarus) O Govortsova	3	5
(South Africa) N Grandin (Czech Republic) V Uhlířová	6	2	[8]
(Chinese Taipei) C-j Chuang (Israel) S Pe'er	4	6	[10]
3	(Slovenia) K Srebotnik (China) J Zheng	6	6
WC	(Hungary) T Babos (United States) S Stephens	3	4
Alt	(Spain) S Soler Espinosa (Spain) C Suárez Navarro	1	3
(Slovenia) A Klepač (Poland) A Rosolska	6	6
(Japan) K Date-Krumm (Hungary) Á Szávay	3	2
(United States) L Lee-Waters (United States) M Moulton-Levy	6	6
(Chinese Taipei) H-c Chan (Poland) K Jans-Ignacik	2	6^{2}
4	(Spain) N Llagostera Vives (Spain) MJ Martínez Sánchez	6	7^{7}
(Germany) A-L Grönefeld (Czech Republic) K Peschke	6	5	[10]
(Uzbekistan) A Amanmuradova (Ukraine) K Bondarenko	4	7	[8]
(Slovakia) D Hantuchová (Spain) A Medina Garrigues	6^{5}	2
2	(Czech Republic) A Hlaváčková (Czech Republic) L Hradecká	7^{7}	6

Quarterfinals
1	(United States) L Huber (United States) L Raymond	7^{7}	6
(Chinese Taipei) C-j Chuang (Israel) S Pe'er	6^{5}	2
3	(Slovenia) K Srebotnik (China) J Zheng	6	7
(Slovenia) A Klepač (Poland) A Rosolska	3	5
(United States) L Lee-Waters (United States) M Moulton-Levy	7^{8}	6
4	(Spain) N Llagostera Vives (Spain) MJ Martínez Sánchez	6^{6}	1
(Germany) A-L Grönefeld (Czech Republic) K Peschke	3	3
2	(Czech Republic) A Hlaváčková (Czech Republic) L Hradecká	6	6

Semifinals
1	(United States) L Huber (United States) L Raymond	7	6
3	(Slovenia) K Srebotnik (China) J Zheng	5	3
(United States) L Lee-Waters (United States) M Moulton-Levy	4	6	[7]
2	(Czech Republic) A Hlaváčková (Czech Republic) L Hradecká	6	4	[10]

Final
1	(United States) L Huber (United States) L Raymond	4	6	[10]
2	(Czech Republic) A Hlaváčková (Czech Republic) L Hradecká	6	0	[4]
