= Jana Juricová =

Slovak tennis player

- Full name: Jana Juricová
- Country (sports): Slovakia
- Born: 8 December 1987 (age 38) Piešťany, Czechoslovakia
- Height: 1.83 m (6 ft 0 in)
- College: California
- Prize money: $30,331

Singles
- Career record: 79–56
- Career titles: 1 ITF
- Highest ranking: No. 253 (17 September 2007)

Grand Slam singles results
- French Open Junior: 1R (2004)
- Wimbledon Junior: 1R (2004)

Doubles
- Career record: 15–10
- Career titles: 2 ITF
- Highest ranking: No. 503 (16 July 2007)

Grand Slam doubles results
- French Open Junior: 1R (2004)
- Wimbledon Junior: 1R (2004)

Team competitions
- Fed Cup: 1–0

Jana Juricová (born 8 December 1987 in Piešťany) is a Slovak tennis player. She won one singles and two doubles championships on International Tennis Federation tours. On 16 July 2007, she reached her best doubles ranking of world number 503. On 17 September, she peaked at world number 253 in singles. She has a 1–0 record for Slovakia in Fed Cup doubles.

== College ==
While at California, she won the Honda Sports Award as the nation's best female tennis player in 2011.

She also won two national championships while at Berkeley. One in singles and one in doubles.

== ITF finals (3–3) ==
=== Singles (1–3) ===
Legend $100,000 tournaments $75,000 tournaments $50,000 tournaments $25,000 tournaments $10,000 tournaments	Finals by surface Hard (0–2) Clay (1–1) Grass (0–0) Carpet (0–0)

Outcome	No.	Date	Tournament	Surface	Opponent	Score
Runner-up	1.	12 September 2005	Torre del Greco, Italy	Clay	(Italy) Corinna Dentoni	3–6, 2–6
Winner	1.	19 September 2005	Ciampino, Italy	Clay	(Italy) Emily Stellato	6–2, 6–2
Runner-up	2.	9 January 2006	Stuttgart, Germany	Hard (i)	(Czech Republic) Renata Voráčová	2–6, 4–6
Runner-up	3.	15 January 2007	Fort Walton Beach, United States	Hard	(France) Pauline Parmentier	4–6, 3–6

=== Doubles (2–0) ===
Legend $100,000 tournaments $75,000 tournaments $50,000 tournaments $25,000 tournaments $10,000 tournaments	Finals by surface Hard (1–0) Clay (1–0) Grass (0–0) Carpet (0–0)

Outcome	No.	Date	Tournament	Surface	Partner	Opponents	Score
Winner	1.	7 February 2005	Montechoro, Portugal	Hard	(Slovakia) Lenka Broosová	(France) Émilie Bacquet (France) Anaïs Laurendon	6–4, 2–6, 6–2
Winner	2.	12 September 2005	Torre del Greco, Italy	Clay	(Germany) Maraike Biglmaier	(Austria) Stefanie Haidner (Italy) Valentina Sulpizio	6–2, 4–6, 6–3

== Fed Cup participation ==
=== Doubles ===
Edition	Stage	Date	Location	Against	Surface	Partner	Opponents	W/L	Score
2007 Fed Cup; World Group II	P/O	15 July 2007	Košice, Slovakia	Serbia	Hard (i)	(Slovakia) Janette Husárová	(Serbia) Ana Jovanović (Serbia) Ana Timotić	W	6–4, 6–2
