= 2012 WTA Tour Championships =

- Date: 23–28 October
- Edition: 42nd (singles) / 37th (doubles)
- Draw: 8S / 4D
- Surface: Hard (indoor)
- Location: Istanbul, Turkey
- Venue: Sinan Erdem Dome

Champions

Singles
- (United States) Serena Williams

Doubles
- (Russia) Maria Kirilenko / (Russia) Nadia Petrova
- WTA Finals

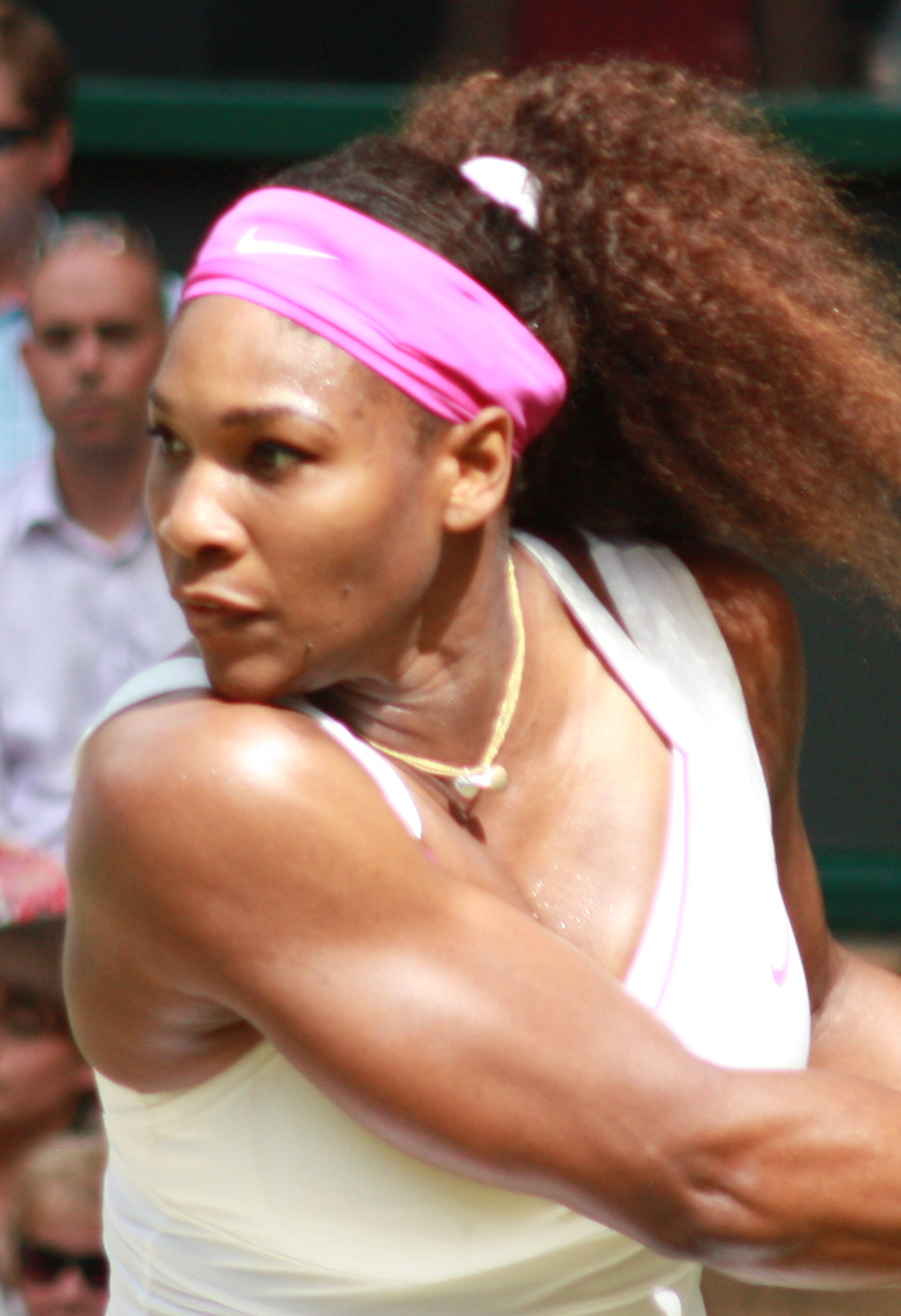

The 2012 WTA Tour Championships was a tennis tournament played at Istanbul, Turkey from October 23 to October 28, 2012. It was the 42nd edition of the singles event and the 37th edition of the doubles competition. The tournament was held at the Sinan Erdem Dome and was contested by eight singles players and four doubles teams. It was the larger of two season ending championships on the 2012 WTA Tour.

The tournament featured the top eight singles players and the top four doubles teams in the race to Istanbul. Victoria Azarenka, Maria Sharapova, Serena Williams, Agnieszka Radwańska, Angelique Kerber, Petra Kvitová, Sara Errani and Li Na qualified for the singles competition. Kvitová withdrew from the championships after one match and was replaced by Sam Stosur. Radwańska and Errani's round robin match set the record for the longest match in WTA Tour Championships history within the best-of-three system. Azarenka, Sharapova, Williams and Radwańska qualified from the red and white groups for the semifinals. This was the first time since 1989 that the world's top four ranked women's players all made it to the semifinals of the tournament and the first time since 2003 that the top four seeds made the same stage. Williams went on to win her third season ending championship.

In the doubles Sara Errani and Roberta Vinci, Andrea Hlaváčková and Lucie Hradecká, Liezel Huber and Lisa Raymond and Maria Kirilenko and Nadia Petrova made up the teams. The competition started in the semifinals and it was the all-Russian pairing of Kirilenko and Petrova who claimed the title.

== Finals ==
=== Singles ===
- (United States) Serena Williams defeated (Russia) Maria Sharapova, 6–4, 6–3.

It was Williams' seventh title of the season and the 46th of her career. It was her third WTA Championships title, having also won in 2001 and 2009.

=== Doubles ===
- (Russia) Maria Kirilenko / (Russia) Nadia Petrova defeated (Czech Republic) Andrea Hlaváčková / (Czech Republic) Lucie Hradecká, 6–1, 6–4.

== Tournament ==
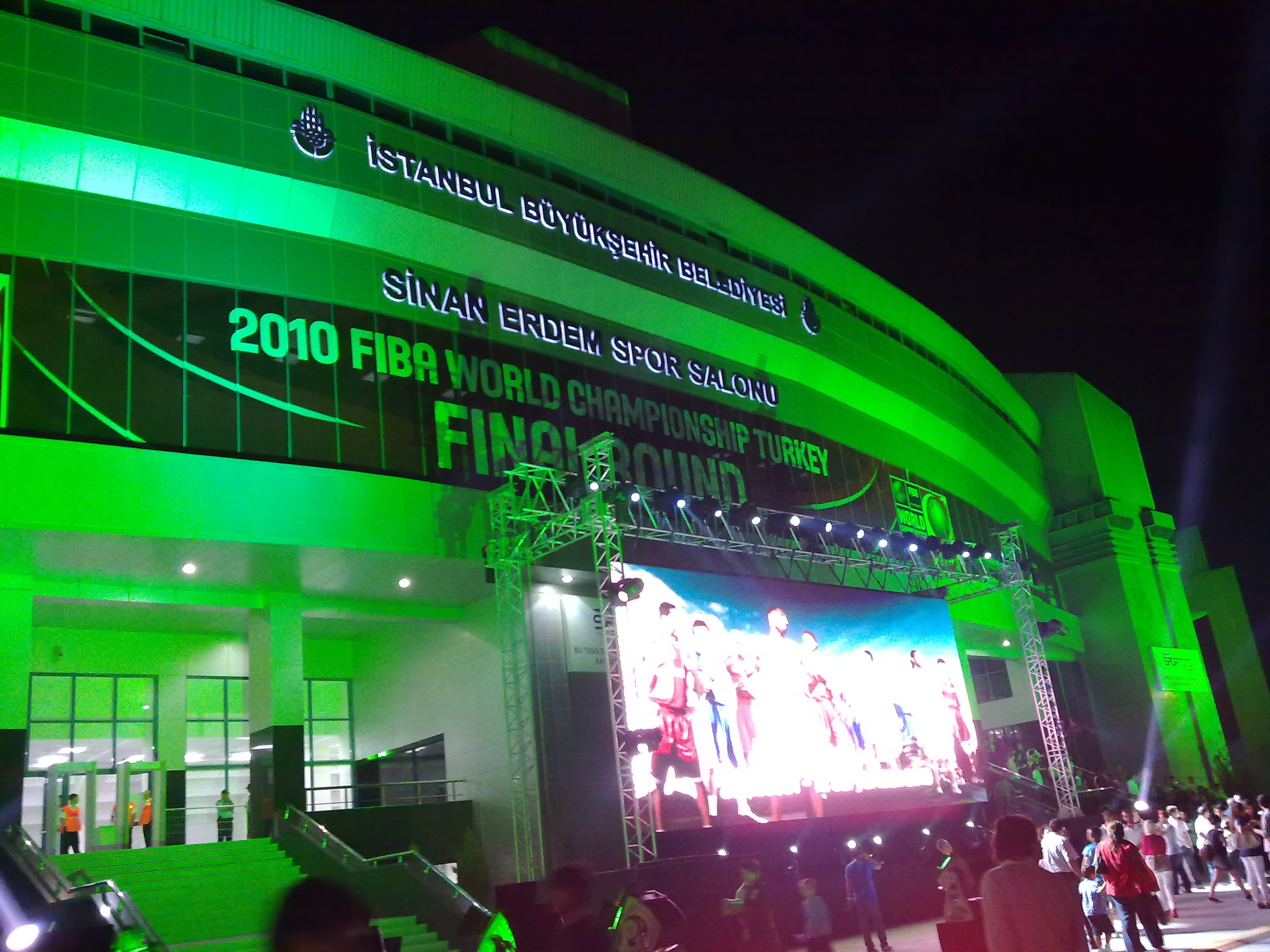
Sinan Erdem Dome hosted the WTA Championships for the second time in 2012.

The 2012 WTA Championships took place at the Sinan Erdem Dome 23–28 October 2012. It was the 41st edition of the event. The tournament was run by the Women's Tennis Association (WTA) and was part of the 2012 WTA Tour. It was the larger of the two season ending championships on the 2012 WTA Tour, the smaller being the latter was only for players who did not qualify for the WTA Championships.

=== Format ===
The singles event featured eight players and began as a round robin event, split into two groups of four. Over the first four days of competition, each player met the other three players in their group, with the top two in each group advancing to the semifinals. The first-placed player in one group met the second-placed player in the other group, and vice versa. The winners of each semifinal met in the championship match.

==== Round robin tie-breaking methods ====
The final standings of each group shall be determined by the first of the following methods that apply:

1. Greatest number of wins
2. Greatest number of matches played; or
3. Head-to-head results if only two players are tied, or if three players are tied then:

a If three players each have the same number of wins, a player having played less than all three matches is automatically eliminated and the player advancing to the single elimination competition is the winner of the match-up of the two remaining tied players; or
b Highest percentage of sets won; or
c Highest percentage of games won

The doubles competition has four teams playing in a straight knockout format from the semifinal stage.

== Prize money and points ==
The total prize money for the 2012 WTA Championships was 4.9 million United States dollars.

Stage	Singles	Doubles	Points ^{1}
Champion	RR^{2} + $1,295,000	$375,000	RR^{2} + 810
Runner-up	RR^{2} + $435,000	$187,500	RR^{2} + 360
Semifinalist	RR^{2} + $30,000	$93,750	RR^{2}
Round robin (3 wins)	$455,000	–	690
Round robin (2 wins)	$340,000	–	530
Round robin (1 win)	$225,000	–	370
Round robin (0 wins)	$110,000	–	210
Alternates	$50,000	–	

- ^{1} for every match played in the round robin a player got 70 points automatically, and for each round robin win they got 160 additional points
- ^{2} RR means Prize money or Points won in the round robin Round. RR for doubles was 690

== Qualified players ==
=== Singles ===
#	Players	Points	Tourn	Date Qualified
1	Victoria Azarenka (BLR)	10,190	15(14)	6 Sep
2	Maria Sharapova (RUS)	9,115	15(12)	6 Sep
3	Serena Williams (USA)	7,900	13(12)	10 Sep
4	Agnieszka Radwańska (POL)	7,095	20	24 Sep
5	Angelique Kerber (GER)	5,470	19	4 Oct
6	Petra Kvitová (CZE)	5,215	18(16)	4 Oct
7	Sara Errani (ITA)	4,855	21	4 Oct
8	Li Na (CHN)	4,726	17(16)	5 Oct

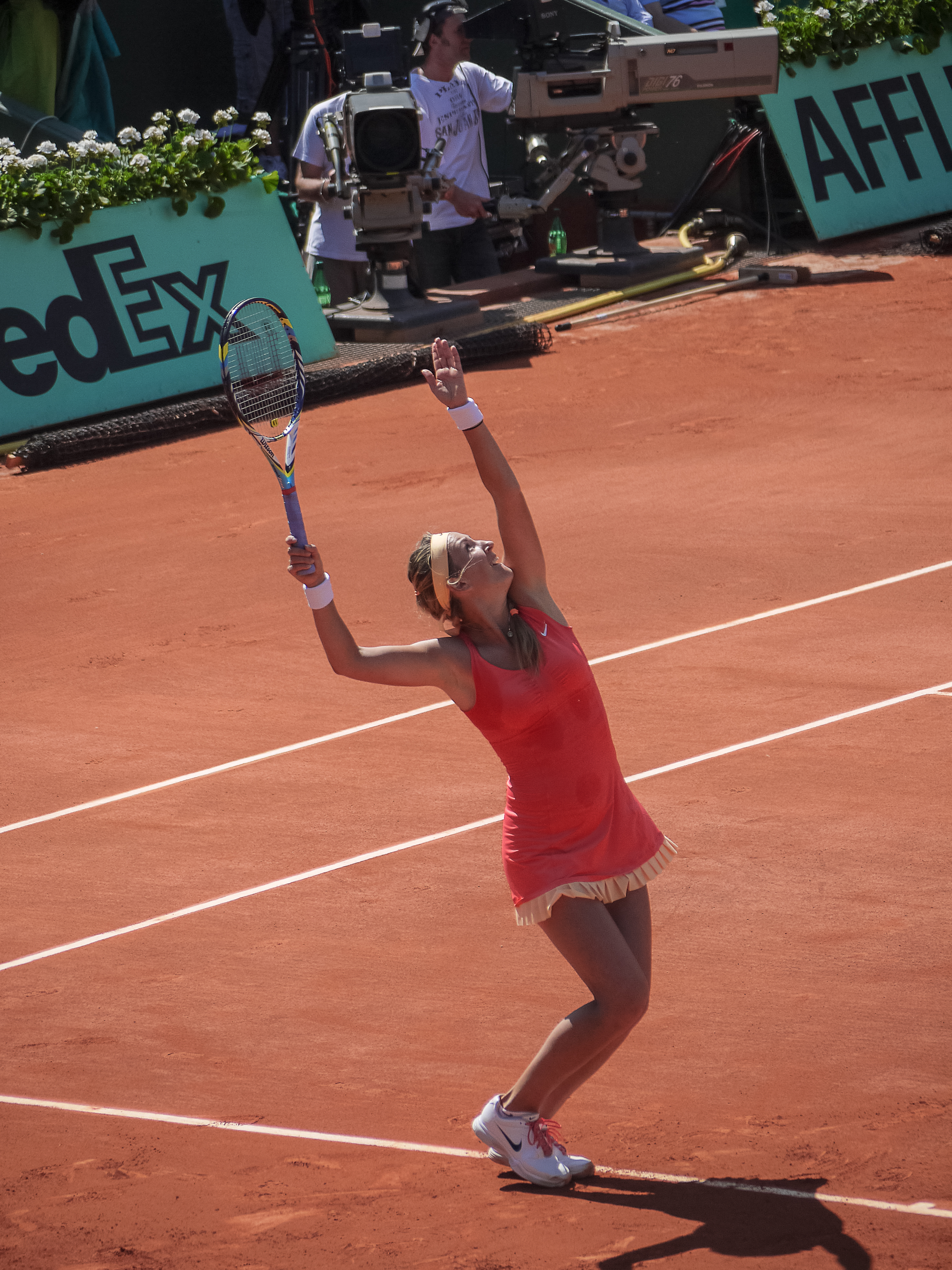
Victoria Azarenka started the season with a 26-match winning-streak, including her first major.

On September 6, Victoria Azarenka and Maria Sharapova became the first two players to qualify for the championships.

Victoria Azarenka started the year strongly, winning the Apia International Sydney over Li Na, 6–2, 1–6, 6–3. She then followed this up by winning her maiden grand slam at the Australian Open, defeating Maria Sharapova, 6–3, 6–0. With the win, she claimed the no. 1 ranking for the first time. Her winning streak continued in the Qatar Total Open. She won the title without dropping a set, beating Samantha Stosur, 6–1, 6–2 in the final. She then won her fourth title of the year at the BNP Paribas Open, once again defeating Sharapova, 6–2, 6–3. Her streak ended when she was defeated by Marion Bartoli in the quarterfinals of Sony Ericsson Open. During the clay season, she reached back-to-back finals, in Porsche Tennis Grand Prix, losing to Sharapova, 1–6, 4–6, and the Mutua Madrid Open, losing to Serena Williams, 1–6, 3–6. At the French Open, she lost in the fourth round to Dominika Cibulková, 2–6, 6–7^{(4–7)}. Seeded second at Wimbledon, she reached the semifinals, where she was defeated by Serena, 3–6, 6–7^{(6–8)}. At the Summer Olympics, she reached the semifinals, where she once again lost to Serena, 1–6, 2–6. However, she won the bronze medal match against Maria Kirilenko, earning Belarus their first tennis medal in history. She teamed up with Max Mirnyi for the mixed-doubles event, where she won the gold medal after defeating Laura Robson and Andy Murray in the gold-medal match. Seeded first at the US Open, Azarenka defeated the defending champion, Samantha Stosur, in the quarterfinals and Sharapova in the semifinals, but lost to Williams in her first US Open final, 2–6, 6–2, 5–7. She then won the China Open as the top seed, defeating Sharapova 6–3, 6–1 in the final and did not drop a set in the tournament. Azarenka won her sixth title of the year at the Generali Ladies Linz defeating Julia Görges 6–3, 6–4, after blowing a 5–0 in the second.

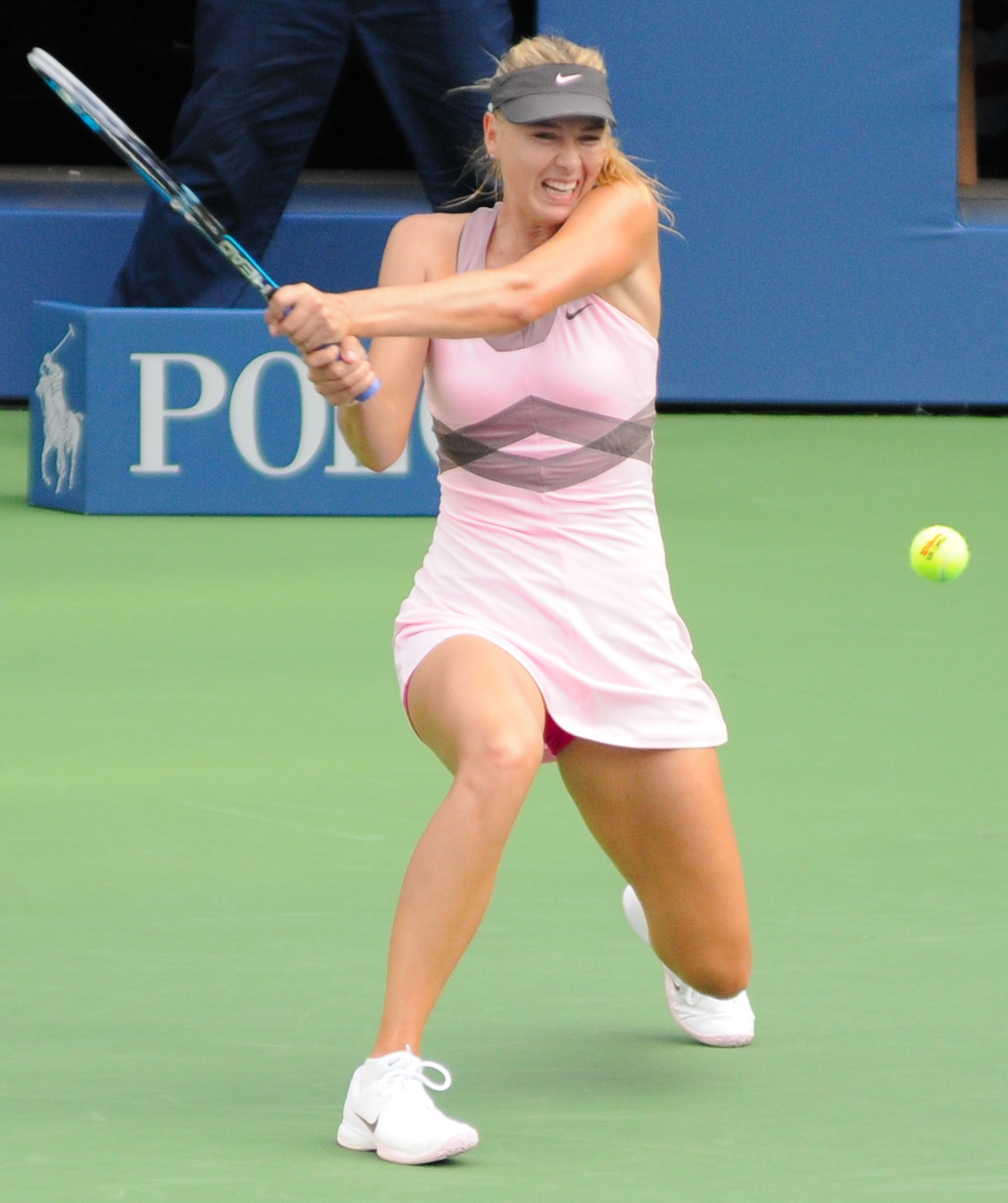
Maria Sharapova completed her grand slam collection after triumphing at the French Open.

Maria Sharapova started 2012 by reaching the final of the Australian Open. Being the favorite for the title, she succumbed in a 3–6, 0–6 defeat by first time grand slam finalist, Victoria Azarenka, in the final. She followed up her consistent performance with back-to-back final appearances at the BNP Paribas Open, losing to Azarenka, 2–6, 3–6, and the Sony Ericsson Open, losing to Agnieszka Radwańska, 5–7, 4–6. She then won her first title of the year at the Porsche Tennis Grand Prix, defeating world no. 1 Azarenka, 6–1, 6–4. She then also won the Internazionali BNL d'Italia, defeating Li Na, 4–6, 6–4, 7–6^{(7–5),} coming back from 0–4 in the second set. At the French Open, she won her fourth grand slam singles title, defeating Sara Errani, 6–3, 6–2, in the final. The victory gave her a career grand slam and returned her to world no. 1. Entering Wimbledon as the top seed, Sharapova lost in the fourth round to Sabine Lisicki, 4–6, 3–6. She rebounded well at the Summer Olympics, winning the silver medal after being outplayed by Serena Williams in the final, 0–6, 1–6. Despite skipping the US Open Series, she reached the US Open's semifinals, but lost to Azarenka. She then reached the final of the China Open, once again facing Azarenka but lost 3–6, 1–6.

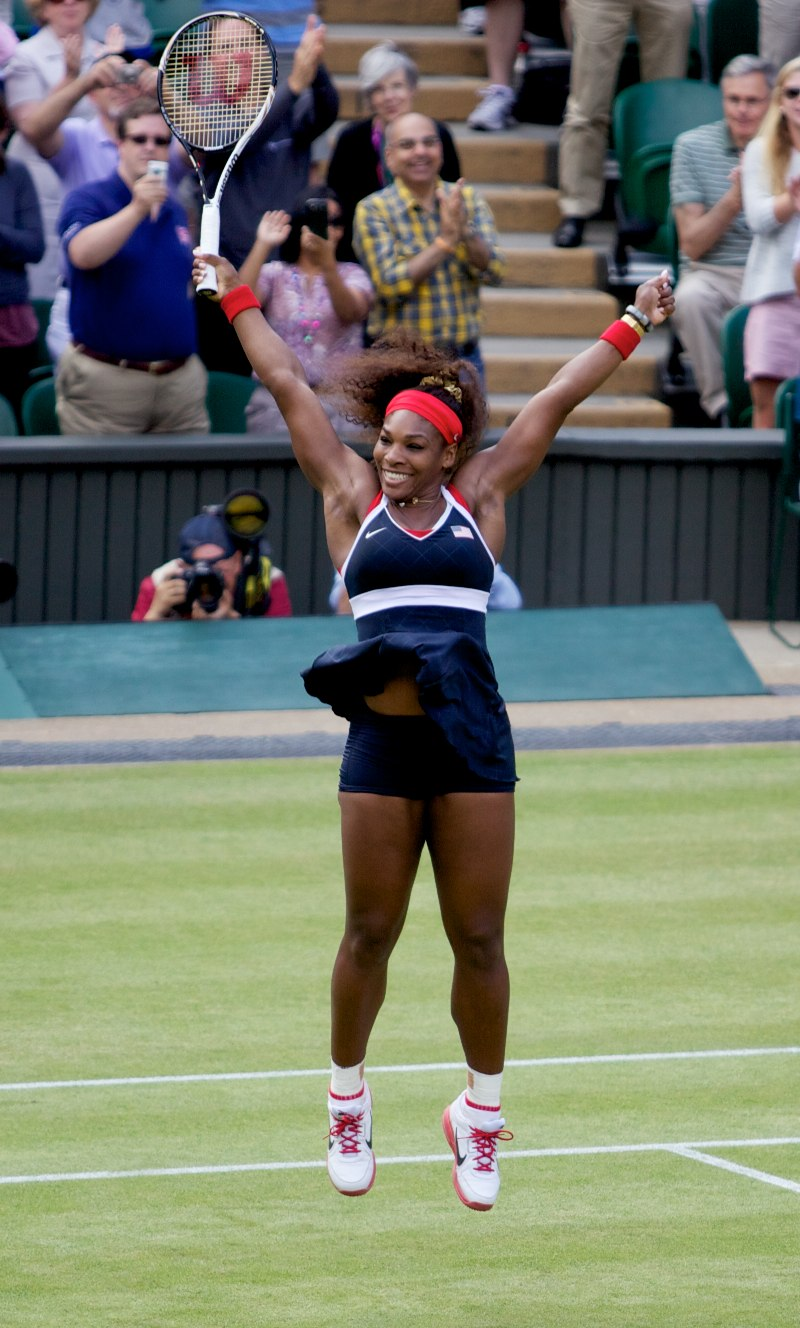
Serena Williams won two Grand Slam titles and the Olympic gold in 2012

On September 10, Serena Williams became the third player to qualify for the championships.

Serena Williams did not enjoy a good start of the season, injuring her ankle at her first tournament of 2012 in Brisbane and succumbing in the fourth round of the Australian Open to Ekaterina Makarova, 2–6, 3–6. In the clay season, she won her first title on clay since 2008 at the Family Circle Cup, losing only 15 games and defeating Lucie Šafářová, 6–0, 6–1, in the final. She then won the Mutua Madrid Open over Victoria Azarenka, 6–1, 6–3. Coming to the French Open as a heavy favorite with a 17-match winning streak, Williams suffered a shocking first-round loss to Virginie Razzano, 6–4, 6–7^{(5–7)}, 3–6. This marked Williams' first loss in the first round in a Grand Slam. However, she regrouped well and triumphed at Wimbledon by defeating Agnieszka Radwańska in the final, 6–1, 5–7, 6–2, for her 14th Grand Slam title, came back after losing a 4–2 lead in the second. The following week, she defended her title at the Bank of the West Classic, defeating CoCo Vandeweghe, 7–5, 6–3. At the Summer Olympics, she won the gold medal after dominating Maria Sharapova, 6–0, 6–1, in the final. She lost just a total of 17 games during the event. This victory completed the career Golden Slam in singles, making her only the second woman (after Steffi Graf) to do so. She also won the doubles gold with sister Venus Williams for the third time, over Lucie Hradecká and Andrea Hlaváčková, 6–4, 6–4. Her 19-match winning streak ended at the Western & Southern Open to Angelique Kerber. At the US Open, she reached the final with the loss of just 19 games. In the final, she defeated world no. 1, Victoria Azarenka, 6–2, 2–6, 7–5, for her second Grand Slam singles title of the year and 15th overall.

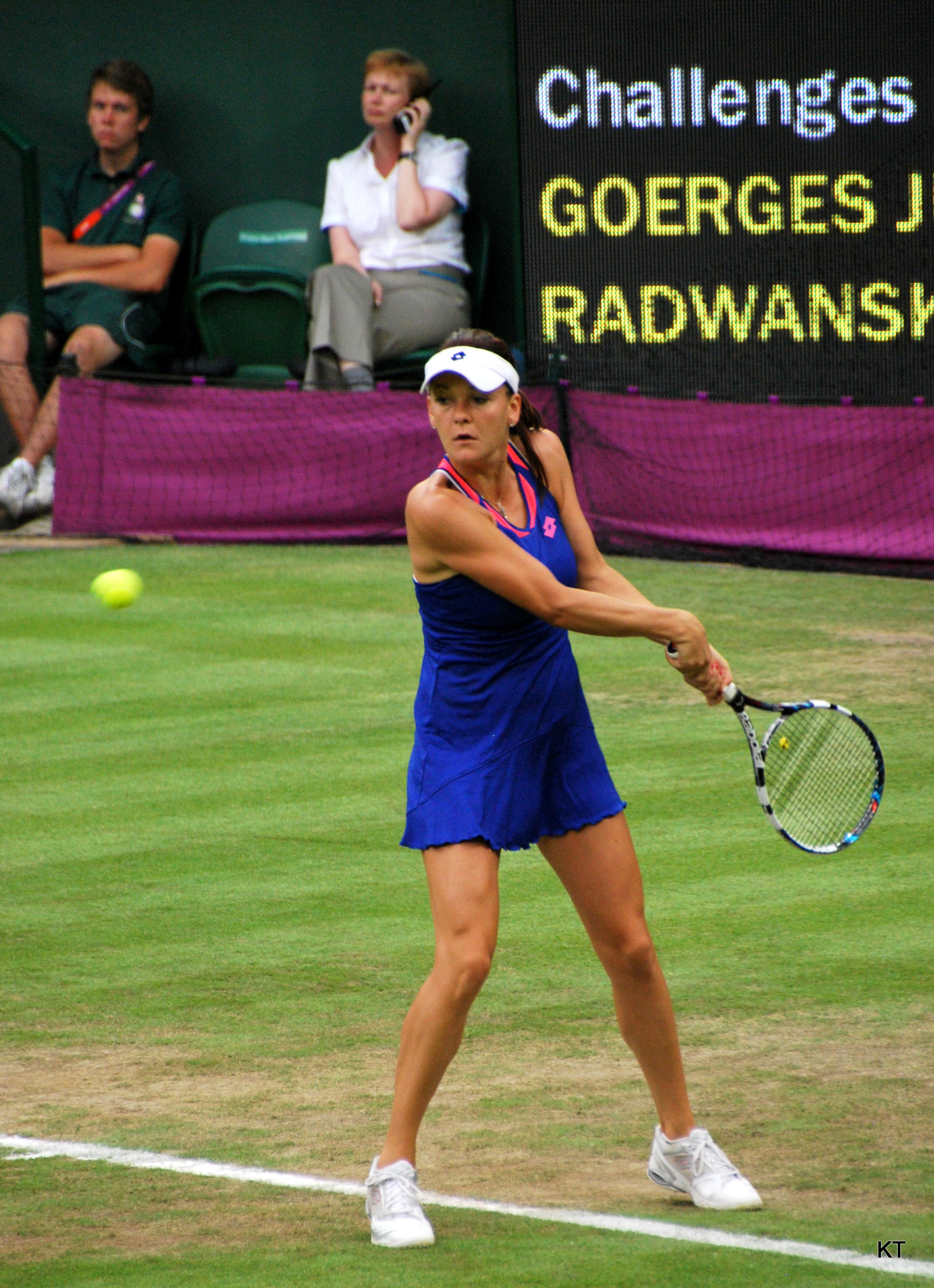
Agnieszka Radwańska reached her first grandslam singles final in 2012

On September 24, Agnieszka Radwańska became the fourth player to qualify for the championships.

Agnieszka Radwańska began the season with a semifinal appearance at Apia International Sydney and a quarterfinal finish at the Australian Open. She claimed her first title of the year at the Dubai Tennis Championships over Julia Görges, 7–5, 6–4. She claimed her second title of the year at the Sony Ericsson Open by defeating Maria Sharapova in the final, 7–5, 6–4. In the clay season, she reached two semifinals, before losing in her opening match in the Internazionali BNL d'Italia to Petra Cetkovská, 4–6, 6–4, 1–6, her first lost to a player other than Azarenka in the year. However, she bounced back by winning the Brussels Open over Simona Halep, 7–5, 6–0. At the French Open, she fell to Svetlana Kuznetsova in the third round, 1–6, 2–6. At Wimbledon, she reached the first Grand Slam singles final of her career, losing to Serena Williams, 1–6, 7–5, 2–6. At the Summer Olympics, she was upset in the first round by Julia Görges, 5–7, 7–6^{(7–5)}, 4–6. At the US Open, she lost for the first time to Roberta Vinci in the fourth round, 1–6, 4–6. She reached the final of the 2012 Toray Pan Pacific Open, where she was the defending champion, but was upset in the final by Nadia Petrova, 0–6, 6–1, 3–6.

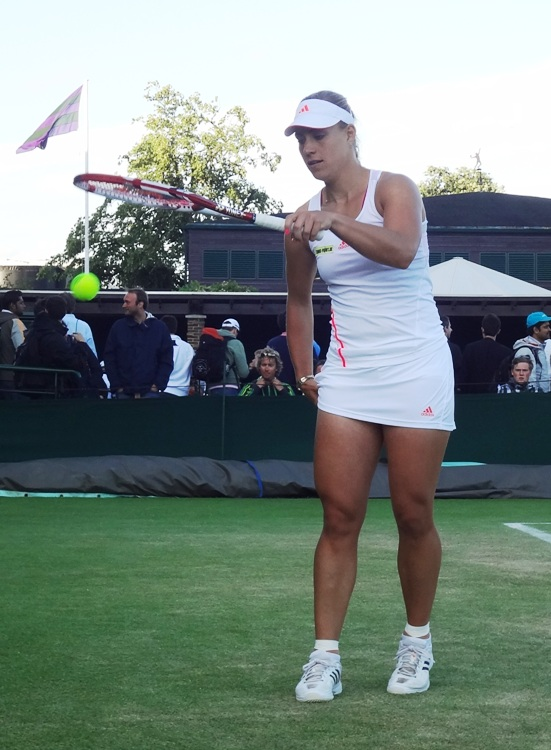
Angelique Kerber reached three Premier finals, winning one

On October 4, three more spots were filled, as Angelique Kerber, Petra Kvitová, and Sara Errani qualified for the championships.

Angelique Kerber enjoyed her best season so far. She reached two semifinals in her Australian Open preparation, before losing in the third round of the Australian Open to Maria Sharapova, 1–6, 2–6. She then claimed her first career title at the Open GDF Suez, defeating Marion Bartoli, 7–6^{(7–3)}, 5–7, 6–3. She won her second title of the year at the e-Boks Open, defeating defending champion Caroline Wozniacki, 6–4, 6–4. At the French Open, she fell in the quarterfinals to Sara Errani 3–6, 6–7^{(2–7)}. In the grass season, she reached the final of the Aegon International, losing to Tamira Paszek, 7–5, 3–6, 5–7, despite having five match points and a 5–3 lead. At Wimbledon, reached her second Grand Slam semifinal, but ended up losing to Agnieszka Radwańska, 3–6, 4–6. At the Western & Southern Open, Kerber reached her first Premier 5 final and fourth final of the year, but lost to Li Na, 1–6, 6–3, 1–6. At the US Open, after reaching the semifinals the previous year, she fell in the fourth round to Errani, 6–7^{(5–7)}, 3–6.

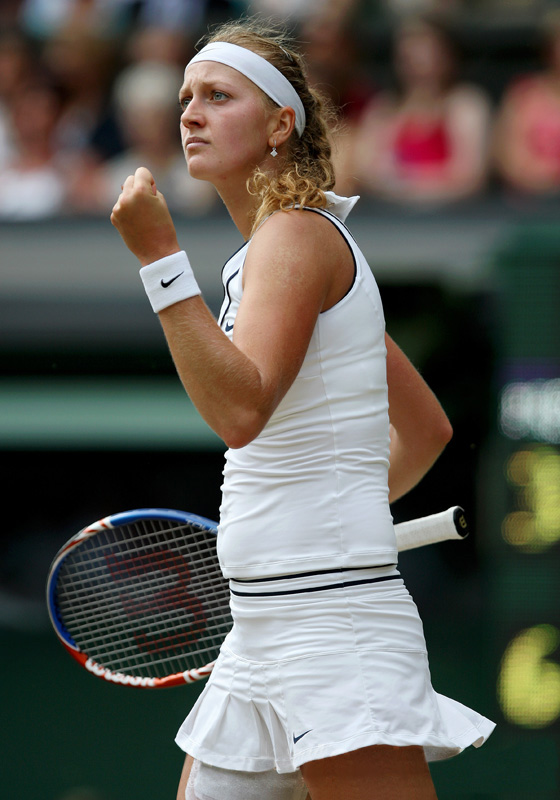
Petra Kvitová reached two Grand Slam semifinals in 2012

Petra Kvitová came into 2012 as a strong contender. She began the year by winning the Hopman Cup with Tomáš Berdych over France's Marion Bartoli and Richard Gasquet. At the Australian Open, she reached the semifinals, losing to Maria Sharapova, 2–6, 6–3, 4–6. At Wimbledon as the defending champion, she lost to eventual champion Serena Williams in the quarterfinals, 3–6, 5–7. She then claimed her first title of the year at the Rogers Cup, defeating Li Na, 7–5, 2–6, 6–3, in the final. She claimed the US Open Series top spot, after winning the New Haven Open at Yale, defeating Russian Maria Kirilenko, 7–6^{(11–9)}, 7–5. At the US Open, she was upset by Marion Bartoli in the fourth round, 6–1, 2–6, 0–6.

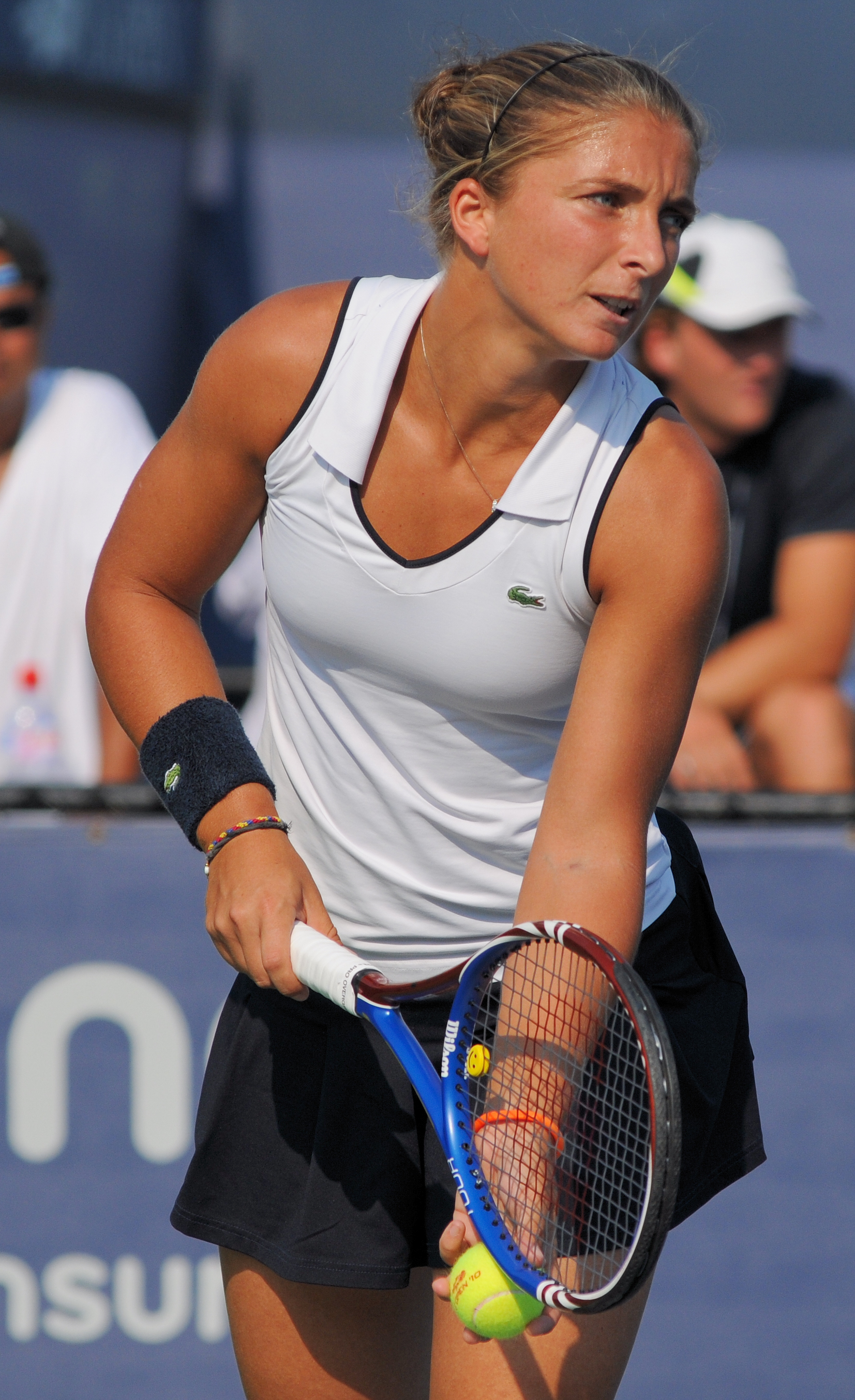
Sara Errani reached the final of the French Open and won four titles

Sara Errani is having a breakthrough season. She reached her first Grand Slam quarterfinals at the Australian Open, losing to Petra Kvitová, 4–6, 4–6. She then won her first title of the year at the Abierto Mexicano Telcel, defeating Flavia Pennetta, 5–7, 7–6^{(7–2)}, 6–0. She then claimed the Barcelona Ladies Open over Dominika Cibulková, 6–2, 6–2. At the Budapest Grand Prix, the Italian claimed her third title of the year over Elena Vesnina, 7–5, 6–4. At the French Open, Errani made a surprising run, reaching the final and earning her first top-10 wins over no. 10 Angelique Kerber, 6–3, 7–6,^{(7–2)} and no. 6 Samantha Stosur, 7–5, 1–6, 6–3, before losing to Maria Sharapova, 3–6, 2–6, in the final. The result broke her into the top 10. At Wimbledon, Errani was on the receiving end of the first golden set in a Grand Slam, when she lost to Yaroslava Shvedova, 0–6, 4–6, in the third round. However, she bounced back by winning her fourth title at the Internazionali Femminili di Palermo over Barbora Záhlavová-Strýcová 6–1, 6–3. At the US Open, she reached her second Grand Slam semifinal, where she lost to Serena Williams, 1–6, 2–6.

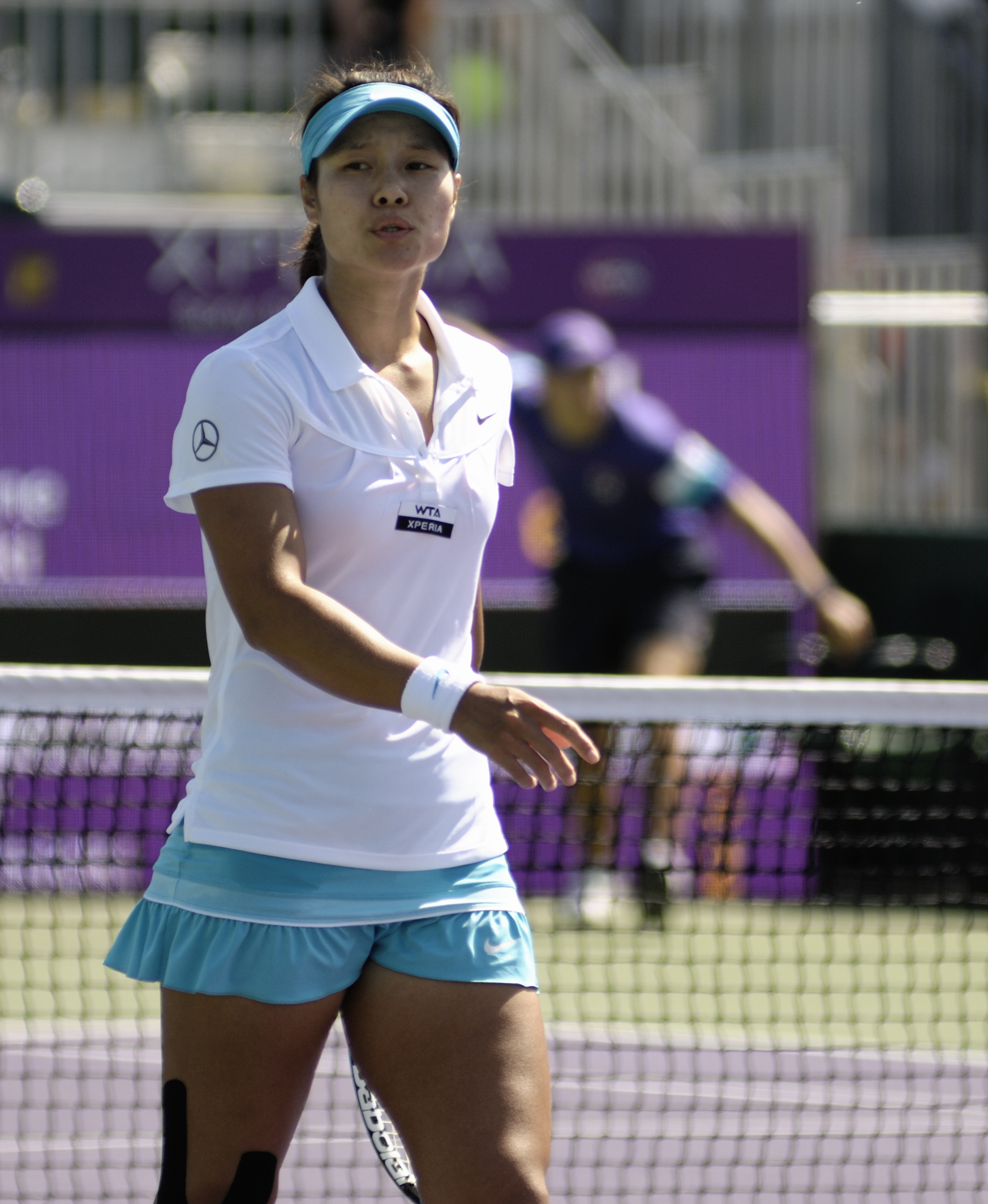
Li Na won her first title of the year in Cincinnati.

On October 5, after reaching the semifinals of the China Open, Li Na became the last qualifier.

Li Na's season was rather lackluster. She started the year by reaching the final of the Apia International Sydney (where she was the defending champion), losing to Victoria Azarenka in the final, 2–6, 6–1, 3–6. At the Australian Open, she lost to Kim Clijsters in the fourth round, 6–4, 6–7^{(6–8)}, 4–6, after squandering four consecutive match points when ahead 6–2 in the second-set tiebreak. She reached her second final of the year at the Internazionali BNL d'Italia, losing to Maria Sharapova, 6–4, 4–6, 6–7^{(5–7)}, despite leading 4–0 in the second set. At the French Open as the defending champion, she was upset by Yaroslava Shvedova in the fourth round, 6–3, 2–6, 0–6. At Wimbledon, she fell to Sorana Cîrstea, 3–6, 4–6, in the second round. She then reached her third final of the year at the Rogers Cup, losing to Petra Kvitová, 5–7, 6–2, 3–6. She won her first title of the year at the Western & Southern Open over Angelique Kerber, 1–6, 6–3, 6–1, placing her second in the US Open Series. At the US Open, she received a shock exit in the third round to Laura Robson, 4–6, 7–6^{(7–5)}, 2–6.

The first alternate for the championships is Australian Samantha Stosur. Stosur reached 2 finals in the year, but failed to capture a title. She reached her first final of the year at the Qatar Total Open losing to top seed Victoria Azarenka 1–6, 2–6. She reached her second final at the Kremlin Cup losing to Caroline Wozniacki 2–6, 6–4, 5–7, despite leading 3–1 in the final set. She reached the semifinals of the French Open losing to Sara Errani 5–7, 6–1, 3–6. As the defending champion, she fell in the quarterfinals of the US Open losing to Azarenka 1–6, 6–4, 6–7^{(5–7)}. The second alternate is Marion Bartoli, who is an alternate for the second straight year. She reached her first final at the Open GDF Suez losing to Angelique Kerber 6–7^{(3–7)}, 7–5, 3–6. She reached her second final of the year at the Mercury Insurance Open losing to Dominika Cibulková 1–6, 5–7. She reached the quarterfinals of the US Open losing to Maria Sharapova 6–3, 3–6, 4–6.

=== Doubles ===
#	Players	Points	Tourn	Date Qualified
1	Sara Errani (ITA); Roberta Vinci (ITA)	10,097	15	6 September
2	Andrea Hlaváčková (CZE); Lucie Hradecká (CZE)	7,380	14	10 September
3	Liezel Huber (USA); Lisa Raymond (USA)	7,036	19	10 September
4	Maria Kirilenko (RUS); Nadia Petrova (RUS)	5,325	12	20 October

On September 6, Sara Errani and Roberta Vinci became the first doubles team to qualify for the championships.

Sara Errani and Roberta Vinci had a breakthrough season as a team winning 8 titles. They won their first two titles of the year back-to-back at the Monterrey Open over Date-Krumm & Zhang 6–2, 7–6^{(8–6)} and Abierto Mexicano Telcel over Domínguez Lino & Parra Santonja 6–2, 6–1. They won their third title at the Barcelona Ladies Open over Pennetta & Schiavone 6–0, 6–2. They then won 4 titles in a row, this begun in the Mutua Madrid Open winning 6–1, 3–6, [10–4] and Internazionali BNL d'Italia 6–2, 7–5 both times over Makarova & Vesnina. They then won their first slam titles at the Paris against Kirilenko & Petrova 4–6, 6–4, 6–2. They continued their winning ways at the UNICEF Open defeating Kirilenko & Petrova 6–4, 3–6, [11–9]. They won their eight title and second slam at the US Open against Hlaváčková and Hradecká 6–4, 6–2. They also reached two other finals both losing to Russian pairings, at the Australian Open to Kuznetsova & Zvonareva 7–5, 4–6, 3–6 and the Sony Ericsson Open to Kirilenko & Petrova 6–7^{(0–7)}, 6–4, [4–10].

On September 10, two more teams qualified for the championships. They were Andrea Hlaváčková and Lucie Hradecká from Czech Republic and Liezel Huber and Lisa Raymond from the United States.

Andrea Hlaváčková and Lucie Hradecká had a solid season in 2012. They were able to reach 7 finals, winning 3 of them. Their first title came in ASB Classic over Görges & Pennetta 6–7^{(2–7)}, 6–2, [10–7]. They then won their second title at the Memphis International over Dushevina & Govortsova 6–3, 6–4. They did not reach a final until the grass season, however it came in with 5 straight finals. The first one in the Wimbledon losing to Serena & Venus 5–7, 4–6 They then won the silver medal at the Summer Olympics losing once again to Serena & Venus 4–6, 4–6 They then won their biggest title of the year at the Western & Southern Open defeating Srebotnik & Zheng 6–1, 6–3. The following week, they reach the final of the New Haven Open at Yale losing to Huber & Raymond 6–4, 0–6, [4–10]. They then reached their second slam final of the year at the US Open losing to Errani & Vinci 4–6, 2–6, their first loss to the team.

Liezel Huber and Lisa Raymond started early parts of the year strongly, winning 4 successive titles. They won the Open GDF Suez over Grönefeld & Martić 7–6^{(7–3)}, 6–1 and the Qatar Total Open over Kops-Jones & Spears 6–3, 6–1. They then beat Mirza & Vesnina in the Dubai Tennis Championships 6–2, 6–1 and BNP Paribas Open 6–2, 6–3. They did not win any title until the New Haven Open at Yale over Hlaváčková & Hradecká 4–6, 6–0, [10–4]. At the Summer Olympics, they lost to Maria Kirilenko and Nadia Petrova in the bronze medal match 4–6, 6–4, 6–1. They finished runner-up at three tournaments this year, at the Apia International Sydney losing to Peschke & Srebotnik 1–6, 6–4, [11–13], at the Aegon Classic to Babos & Hsieh 5–7, 7–6^{(7–2)}, [8–10], and Aegon International to Llagostera Vives & Martínez Sánchez 6–4 RET.

On October 20, the final spot went to the Russian pairing of Maria Kirilenko and Nadia Petrova after defeating co-contenders Raquel Kops-Jones and Abigail Spears in the semifinals of the Kremlin Cup

Maria Kirilenko and Nadia Petrova compiled a solid season. They won in their first final of the year at the Sony Ericsson Open defeating the Italian pairing of Errani and Vinci 7–6^{(7–0)}, 4–6, [10–4]. They reached their first slam final as a team at the French Open once again facing Errani and Vinci, but this time they lost 6–4, 4–6, 2–6. They once again faced Errani and Vinci for the third time in a final in the UNICEF Open, but once again fell short losing 4–6, 6–3, [9–11]. At the Olympics, the Russians claimed the bronze medals defeating Americans Huber and Raymond. Petrova paired with Vania King at the Mercury Insurance Open and reached the final losing to Kops-Jones and Spears 2–6, 4–6. Petrova also reached another final, this time with Katarina Srebotnik at the Rogers Cup losing to Klaudia Jans-Ignacik and Mladenovic 5–7, 6–2, [7–10].

== Groupings ==
The 2012 edition of the year-end championships featured three current or former World number ones, five Grand Slam champions, two Grand Slam finalists. Two competitors made their debut at the championships. The competitors were divided into two groups representing the colors of the flag of Turkey. The Red group consisted of no. 1 seed Victoria Azarenka, no. 3 seed Serena Williams, no. 5 seed Angelique Kerber and no. 8 seed Li Na. The White Group was composed of no. 2 seed Maria Sharapova, no. 4 seed Agnieszka Radwańska, no. 6 seed Petra Kvitová and no. 7 seed Sara Errani. Samantha Stosur and Marion Bartoli served as alternates.

In the red group, their respective records in their group, World no. 1 Victoria Azarenka was 7–14, Serena Williams was 16–3, Angelique Kerber was 2–8 and Li Na was 10–10. Leading the group Azarenka, has a poor record against Williams being 1–10 lifetime against her and having lost their last eight encounters, 4 times in 2012. Most recently they met in the finals of the 2012 US Open with Williams winning 6–2, 2–6, 7–5. Against Kerber, she has a 2–0 record winning both encounters in 2012, the last in the quarterfinals of the 2012 London Olympics 6–4, 7–5. Against Li, their head-to-head is tied at 4–4 but Azarenka has won their last three encounters, 2 coming in 2012, last meeting a 3–6, 6–3, 6–3 win in the quarterfinals of the 2012 Mutua Madrid Open. Williams on the other hand, is tied at 1–1 head-to-head against Kerber losing their only encounter of 2012 at the 2012 Western & Southern Open 6–4, 6–4. Against Li, she is 5–1 lifetime having won their last four encounters, the last encounter coming at the 2010 Wimbledon Championships 7–5, 6–3. Kerber and Li, the head-to-head is 5–1 in favor of Li who has won their last two encounters. They met 3 times in 2012, most recently in the finals of the 2012 Western & Southern Open with Li winning 1–6, 6–3, 6–1.

In the white group, in their head-to-heads with players within their group, Maria Sharapova was 12–4, Agnieszka Radwańska was 7–11, Petra Kvitová was 8–4, and Sara Errani was 1–8. Like Williams, Sharapova has a good record against each member of her group. Against Radwańska, she is 7–2 lifetime however lost their only encounter of 2012 in the finals of the 2012 Sony Ericsson Open 7–5, 6–4. Against Kvitová, Sharapova leads their head-to-head 4–2, winning their last three encounters most recently in the semifinals of the French Open 6–3, 6–3. Against Errani, Sharapova leads 1–0 winning their only matchup in the finals of the French Open 6–3, 6–2. Radwańska, on the other hand has a mixed record against Kvitová and Errani. She trails Kvitová 0–3, with their last encounter coming at last year's Championships 7–6(4), 6–3 in a round robin matchup. However, against Errani, Radwańska leads their head-to-head 5–1 winning their last four encounters, most recently in the second round of the 2012 Mutua Madrid Open 6–0, 6–1. In the match-up between Kvitová and Errani, the Czech owns a 3–0 record against Errani with all three meeting coming in straight sets all in 2012 most recently at the New Haven Open at Yale with a 6–1, 6–3 scoreline.

The four doubles teams started the semifinals without group play.

== Player head-to-head ==
Below are the head-to-head records as they approached the tournament.

		Azarenka	Sharapova	Williams	Radwańska	Kerber	Kvitová	Errani	Li	Overall	YTD
1	(Belarus) Victoria Azarenka		7–4	1–10	11–3	2–0	2–4	4–1	4–4	31–26	63–8
2	(Russia) Maria Sharapova	4–7		2–9	7–2	3–1	4–2	1–0	8–4	29–25	56–10
3	(United States) Serena Williams	10–1	9–2		3–0	1–1	3–0	4–0	5–1	35–5	53–4
4	(Poland) Agnieszka Radwańska	3–11	2–7	0–3		4–2	0–3	5–1	3–5	17–32	57–17
5	(Germany) Angelique Kerber	0–2	1–3	1–1	2–4		2–1	1–2	1–5	8–18	60–19
6	(Czech Republic) Petra Kvitová	4–2	2–4	0–3	3–0	1–2		3–0	2–2	15–13	45–15
7	(Italy) Sara Errani	1–4	0–1	0–4	1–5	2–1	0–3		0–5	4–23	54–20
8	(China) Li Na	4–4	4–8	1–5	5–3	5–1	2–2	5–0		26–23	41–15

== Day-by-day summaries ==
=== Day 1 ===
The action in this year's Tour Championships began with the White Group with Wimbledon finalist Agnieszka Radwańska and 2011 Wimbledon champion Petra Kvitová. The Czech entered the match with a 25-match winning streak on indoor courts with her last defeat coming in Moscow in 2010. Radwańska never having beaten Kvitová before raced out to an early 3–0 lead only to see Kvitová even things out at 3–3. Radwańska however regrouped to win the next three games to take the first set 6–3. Kvitová dropped her first two service games of the second, was able to break back once, but she was unable to threaten the steadier Radwańska who closed out the match with a 6–3, 6–2 scoreline.

They were followed by Wimbledon, US Open and Olympic champion Serena Williams and Wimbledon semifinalist and first time qualifier Angelique Kerber. Similar to the first match Williams raced out to an early 3–0 lead only to see Kerber even things out at 3–3. However four games later Williams was able to break Kerber to win the first set 6–4. The first three games went on serve until Williams was able to break for a 3–1 lead. She held then broke Kerber again, serving out the match 6–4, 6–1.

The final match for the day featured French Open champion Maria Sharapova and French Open finalist Sara Errani. It was a rematch of the 2012 French Open finals. They went on serve until Errani failed to convert either break point at 15–40 on the Sharapova serve. The Russian then broke serve at the eight game and closed it out 6–3. Sharapova then carried on into the second set winning it 6–2.

Matches
Group	Winner	Loser	Score
White Group	(Poland) Agnieszka Radwańska [4]	(Czech Republic) Petra Kvitová [6]	6–3, 6–2
Red Group	(United States) Serena Williams [3]	(Germany) Angelique Kerber [5]	6–4, 6–1
White Group	(Russia) Maria Sharapova [2]	(Italy) Sara Errani [7]	6–3, 6–2

=== Day 2 ===
The second day began with the Red Group with Wimbledon, US Open and Olympic champion Serena Williams and 2011 French Open champion Li Na. The match began with Williams breaking Li's serve to take an early 1–0 lead. However Li was quick to strike back reeling off four games to take a 4–1 lead only to see Williams comeback to take four straight games herself to take a 5–4 lead to serve for the set. Li was able to break at love for 5–5 but was broken right back. Williams again served for the set but was broken again at love to send the set into a tie-breaker. Williams won it comfortably 7–2 to take a one set lead. The second began in similar fashion with Li breaking for a 1–0 lead only to see Williams again reel off four games to take a 4–1 lead. The rest of the set went on serve until Williams closed out the match 7–6^{(7–2)}, 6–3.

They were followed by World No. 1 and Australian Open champion Victoria Azarenka and Angelique Kerber. Kerber raced out to an early 3–1 lead. Azarenka however was able to level the match at 4–4. The set went on serve and into a near-historic tie-break, where Kerber saved five set points – four with huge forehands – to claim it, 13–11. It was the equal-longest tie-break in the history of the tournament and the first time Kerber had taken a set off Azarenka in their two prior meetings. The second set began with Azarenka building a 4–2 lead only to see Kerber take three straight games to lead 5–4. Serving to stay in the match Azarenka saved 2 match points with some ferocious ball striking to even the set at 5–5. The set again went to a tie-break which Azarenka won 7–2. Both players went toe to toe in the final set until Azarenka was able to break for 5–3 to serve for the match. Kerber was able to break right back but was unable to hold serve while serving to stay in the match, with Azarenka closing out the 3 hour, 6 minute contest 6–7^{(9–11)}, 7–6^{(7–2)}, 6–4.

The final match for the day featured Maria Sharapova and Agnieszka Radwańska. It was a rematch of the Sony Ericsson Open finals. The match began with eleven straight holds of serve until Radwańska was able to break Sharapova to take a one set lead 7–5. Sharapova broke Radwańska in the beginning of the first set but Radwańska broke back immediately, Radwańska then led 4–2 with a break, Sharapova then took 3 games in a row but got broken when serving for the set at 5–4. Sharapova then took the next two games to take it to a final set. At the third set both held serve until the fifth and sixth games where both traded breaks of serve. Sharapove then broke at the eleventh game of the set and served it out to win 5–7, 7–5, 7–5.

Matches
Group	Winner	Loser	Score
Red Group	(United States) Serena Williams [3]	(China) Li Na [8]	7–6^{(7–2)}, 6–3
Red Group	(Belarus) Victoria Azarenka [1]	(Germany) Angelique Kerber [5]	6–7^{(11–13)}, 7–6^{(7–2)}, 6–4
White Group	(Russia) Maria Sharapova [2]	(Poland) Agnieszka Radwańska [4]	5–7, 7–5, 7–5

=== Day 3 ===
The day began with the Red Group with Li Na and Angelique Kerber. Prior to the match Li lead their head-to-head 5–1, and both are looking for their first win in the event. Kerber after an amazing display against Azarenka in a 3-hour loss started well and led 4–2, however Li came back and won the first set 6–4 after a doubles fault from the German. Li then closed it out in the second set winning it 6–3.

They were followed by Victoria Azarenka and Serena Williams in a rematch of the 2012 US Open finals. The match began with seven straight holds of serve until Williams was able to break for a 5–3 lead awith a chance to serve out the set. Azarenka was able to break straight back for 4–5 but was unable to hold serve, double-faulting to give away the set one 6–4. Azarenka began the second by reeling of three straight games for a 3–0 lead breaking Williams twice along the way. However she was unable to hold on as Williams won four straight games herself to take a 4–3 lead. Azarenka was able to hold for 4–4. Williams held for 5–4 with Azarenka now having to serve to stay in the match. She, however was not able to hold serve, double-faulting on match point. Williams have now improved her record against Azarenka to 11–1 and advancing into semifinals as the Red Group's top player with a 3–0 match win record and without the loss of a set. Azarenka will now have to defeat Li Na to advance to the semifinals and secure the year end No.1 or Maria Sharapova will have a chance to end the year at No.1 by winning the title.

The final match for the day featured Sara Errani and 2011 US Open champion Samantha Stosur who entered the event as an alternate due to the withdrawal of defending champion Petra Kvitová. Errani won the match 6–3, 2–6, 6–0 with a doubles fault from Stosur. Stosur ended with 26 more winners but also 24 more unforced errors in an erratic display.

Matches
Group	Winner	Loser	Score
Red Group	(China) Li Na [8]	(Germany) Angelique Kerber [5]	6–4, 6–3
Red Group	(United States) Serena Williams [3]	(Belarus) Victoria Azarenka [1]	6–4, 6–4
White Group	(Italy) Sara Errani [7]	(Australia) Samantha Stosur [9]	6–3, 2–6, 6–0

=== Day 4 ===
Matches
Group	Winner	Loser	Score
White Group	(Russia) Maria Sharapova [2]	(Australia) Samantha Stosur [9]	6–0, 6–3
White Group	(Poland) Agnieszka Radwańska [4]	(Italy) Sara Errani [7]	6–7^{(6–8)}, 7–5, 6–4
Red Group	(Belarus) Victoria Azarenka [1]	(China) Li Na [8]	7–6^{(7–4)}, 6–3

=== Day 5 ===
Matches
Group	Winner	Loser	Score
Doubles – Semifinals	(Czech Republic) Andrea Hlaváčková [2] (Czech Republic) Lucie Hradecká [2]	(United States) Liezel Huber [3] (United States) Lisa Raymond [3]	7–6^{(8–6)}, 6–1
Singles – Semifinals	(United States) Serena Williams [3]	(Poland) Agnieszka Radwańska [4]	6–2, 6–1
Singles – Semifinals	(Russia) Maria Sharapova [2]	(Belarus) Victoria Azarenka [1]	6–4, 6–2
Doubles – Semifinals	(Russia) Maria Kirilenko [4] (Russia) Nadia Petrova [4]	(Italy) Sara Errani [1] (Italy) Roberta Vinci [1]	1–6, 6–3, [10–4]

=== Day 6 ===
Matches
Group	Winner	Loser	Score
Doubles – Finals	(Russia) Maria Kirilenko [4] (Russia) Nadia Petrova [4]	(Czech Republic) Andrea Hlaváčková [2] (Czech Republic) Lucie Hradecká [2]	6–1, 6–4
Singles – Finals	(United States) Serena Williams [3]	(Russia) Maria Sharapova [2]	6–4, 6–3

== Points breakdown ==
=== Singles ===
Rank	Athlete	Grand Slam tournament				Premier Mandatory				Best Premier 5		Best other						Total points	Tourn
Rank	Athlete	AUS	FRO	WIM	USO	IW	MIA	MAD	BEI	1	2	1	2	3	4	5	6	Total points	Tourn
1	(Belarus) Victoria Azarenka	W 2,000	R16; 280	SF; 900	F 1,400	W 1,000	QF; 250	F 700	W 1,000	W 900	QF; 225	W 470	B 340	F 320	W 280	R16; 125	A 0	10,190	17(16)
2	(Russia) Maria Sharapova	F 1,400	W 2,000	R16; 280	SF; 900	F 700	F 700	QF; 250	F 700	W 900	QF; 225	W 470	S 470	QF; 120	A 0	A 0	A 0	9,115	16(13)
3	(United States) Serena Williams	R16; 280	R128; 5	W 2,000	W 2,000	A 0	QF; 250	W 1,000	A 0	SF; 395	QF; 225	G 685	W 470	W 470	QF; 120			7,900	14(12)
4	(Poland) Agnieszka Radwańska	QF; 500	R32; 160	F 1,400	R16; 280	QF; 250	W 1,000	SF; 450	QF; 250	F 620	SF; 395	W 470	W 470	QF; 225	QF; 225	SF; 200	SF; 200	7,095	21
5	(Germany) Angelique Kerber	R32; 160	QF; 500	SF; 900	R16; 280	SF; 450	R64; 5	R16; 140	QF; 250	F 620	SF; 395	W 470	SF; 395	F 320	W 280	QF; 175	SF; 130	5,470	20
6	(Czech Republic) Petra Kvitová	SF; 900	SF; 900	QF; 500	R16; 280	R32; 80	R64; 5	R32; 80	R32; 80	W 900	SF; 395	W 470	QF; 225	SF; 200	SF; 200	A 0	A 0	5,215	19(17)
7	(Italy) Sara Errani	QF; 500	F 1,400	R32; 160	SF; 900	R128; 5	R64; 5	R32; 80	R64; 5	QF; 225	R16; 125	W 280	W 280	W 280	W 280	SF; 200	SF; 130	4,855	22
8	(China) Li Na	R16; 280	R16; 280	R64; 100	R32; 160	QF; 250	QF; 250	QF; 250	SF; 450	W 900	F 620	F 620	F 320	R16; 125	QF; 120	R32; 1	A 0	4,726	17(16)
9	(Australia) Samantha Stosur	R128; 5	SF; 900	R64; 100	QF; 500	R32; 80	R16; 140	QF; 250	R32; 5	F 620	SF; 395	F 320	QF; 225	SF; 200	SF; 130	R16; 125	R16; 125	4,120	21
10	(France) Marion Bartoli	R32; 160	R64; 100	R64; 100	QF; 500	QF; 250	SF; 450	R64; 5	SF; 450	SF; 395	R16; 125	F 320	F 320	SF; 200	R16; 125	QF; 120	QF; 120	3,740	24

== See also ==
- WTA ranking Points
- 2012 ATP World Tour Finals
- 2012 WTA Tournament of Champions
