= 2012 Qatar Total Open – Singles =

Singles
- 2012 Qatar Total Open

Final
- Champion: (Belarus) Victoria Azarenka
- Runner-up: (Australia) Samantha Stosur
- Score: 6–1, 6–2

Details
- Draw: 56
- Seeds: 16

Events
Singles	Doubles
← 2011 ·	Qatar Total Open	· 2013 →

Victoria Azarenka defeated Samantha Stosur in the final, 6–1, 6–2 to win the singles tennis title at the 2012 WTA Qatar Open.

Vera Zvonareva was the defending champion, but retired during her second round match against Monica Niculescu.

== Seeds ==
The top eight seeds received a bye into the second round.

1. (Belarus) Victoria Azarenka (champion)
2. (Denmark) Caroline Wozniacki (second round)
3. (Australia) Samantha Stosur (final)
4. (Poland) Agnieszka Radwańska (semifinals)
5. (France) Marion Bartoli (semifinals, retired due to a right calf injury)
6. (Russia) Vera Zvonareva (second round, retired due to a left hip injury)
7. (Italy) Francesca Schiavone (second round)
8. (Serbia) Jelena Janković (second round)
9. (Germany) Sabine Lisicki (first round)
10. (Russia) Anastasia Pavlyuchenkova (first round)
11. (Slovakia) Dominika Cibulková (first round)
12. (China) Peng Shuai (second round)
13. (Serbia) Ana Ivanovic (second round)
14. (Russia) Svetlana Kuznetsova (third round)
15. (Slovakia) Daniela Hantuchová (first round)
16. (Germany) Julia Görges (second round)

== Draw ==
=== Key ===
- Q = Qualifier
- WC = Wild card
- LL = Lucky loser
- Alt = Alternate
- SE = Special exempt
- PR = Protected ranking
- ITF = ITF entry
- JE = Junior exempt
- w/o = Walkover
- r = Retired
- d = Defaulted
- SR = Special ranking

=== Finals ===
Quarterfinals
1	(Belarus) Victoria Azarenka	6	6
(Belgium) Yanina Wickmayer	0	4
4	(Poland) Agnieszka Radwańska	6	6
(United States) Christina McHale	1	1
(Romania) Monica Niculescu	2	6	3
3	(Australia) Samantha Stosur	6	2	6
5	(France) Marion Bartoli	7	4	6
(Czech Republic) Lucie Šafářová	5	6	1

Semifinals
1	(Belarus) Victoria Azarenka	6	6
4	(Poland) Agnieszka Radwańska	2	4
3	(Australia) Samantha Stosur	6	0
5	(France) Marion Bartoli	3	0^{r}

Final
1	(Belarus) Victoria Azarenka	6	6
3	(Australia) Samantha Stosur	1	2

=== Top half ===
==== Section 1 ====
First round
Q	(France) C Garcia	6^{6}	6^{4}
(Germany) M Barthel	7^{8}	7^{7}
(Czech Republic) I Benešová	4	6	6
(Czech Republic) B Záhlavová-Strýcová	6	3	1
(Romania) S Halep	3	6	7^{7}
15	(Slovakia) D Hantuchová	6	2	6^{4}
10	(Russia) A Pavlyuchenkova	6	2	3
(Kazakhstan) K Pervak	1	6	6
Q	(France) V Razzano	6	2	6
WC	(Tunisia) O Jabeur	3	6	3
(Japan) A Morita	2	1
(Belgium) Y Wickmayer	6	6

Second round
1	(Belarus) V Azarenka	6	6
(Germany) M Barthel	1	0
(Czech Republic) I Benešová	4	4
(Romania) S Halep	6	6
(Kazakhstan) K Pervak	6	6
Q	(France) V Razzano	4	0
(Belgium) Y Wickmayer	7^{7}	6
7	(Italy) F Schiavone	6^{4}	4

Third round
1	(Belarus) V Azarenka	6	6
(Romania) S Halep	3	1
(Kazakhstan) K Pervak	4	0
(Belgium) Y Wickmayer	6	6

Quarterfinals
1	(Belarus) V Azarenka	6	6
(Belgium) Y Wickmayer	0	4

==== Section 2 ====
First round
Q	(United Kingdom) A Keothavong	7^{7}	7^{7}
(Austria) T Paszek	6^{4}	6^{5}
Q	(Canada) A Wozniak	3	3
Q	(United States) V Lepchenko	6	6
(Belarus) A Yakimova	2	2
16	(Germany) J Görges	6	6
12	(China) S Peng	6	7
WC	(Oman) F Al Nabhani	0	5
(South Africa) C Scheepers	4	3
(United States) C McHale	6	6
WC	(Morocco) N Lalami	0	0
(Israel) S Pe'er	6	6

Second round
4	(Poland) A Radwańska	6	6
Q	(United Kingdom) A Keothavong	1	2
Q	(United States) V Lepchenko	7^{7}	7^{7}
16	(Germany) J Görges	6^{4}	6^{5}
12	(China) S Peng	7	3	2
(United States) C McHale	5	6	6
(Israel) S Pe'er	7^{7}	6
8	(Serbia) J Janković	6^{3}	2

Third round
4	(Poland) A Radwańska	7	6
Q	(United States) V Lepchenko	5	1
(United States) C McHale	4	6	6
(Israel) S Pe'er	6	3	4

Quarterfinals
4	(Poland) A Radwańska	6	6
(United States) C McHale	1	1

=== Bottom half ===
==== Section 3 ====
First round
(Russia) E Vesnina	1	0
(Romania) M Niculescu	6	6
Q	(Russia) V Dushevina	5	2
Q	(Ukraine) K Bondarenko	7	6
(Italy) F Pennetta	6	2	7
11	(Slovakia) D Cibulková	3	6	5
13	(Serbia) A Ivanovic	6	4
(Spain) C Suárez Navarro	1	1^{r}
(Croatia) P Martić	6^{5}	5
(Czech Republic) P Cetkovská	7^{7}	7
(Australia) J Gajdošová	4	1
(Romania) S Cîrstea	6	6

Second round
6	(Russia) V Zvonareva	5	2^{r}
(Romania) M Niculescu	7	3
Q	(Ukraine) K Bondarenko	6	6
(Italy) F Pennetta	4	2
13	(Serbia) A Ivanovic	4	4
(Czech Republic) P Cetkovská	6	6
(Romania) S Cîrstea	4	6^{5}
3	(Australia) S Stosur	6	7^{7}

Third round
(Romania) M Niculescu	7^{7}	6
Q	(Ukraine) K Bondarenko	6^{5}	4
(Czech Republic) P Cetkovská	3	2
3	(Australia) S Stosur	6	6

Quarterfinals
(Romania) M Niculescu	2	6	3
3	(Australia) S Stosur	6	2	6

==== Section 4 ====
First round
(Czech Republic) K Zakopalová	4	1
(Spain) A Medina Garrigues	6	6
(Bulgaria) T Pironkova	6	6
(Slovenia) P Hercog	0	4
(Germany) A Kerber	4	6	6
9	(Germany) S Lisicki	6	4	1
14	(Russia) S Kuznetsova	7	6
(Spain) MJ Martínez Sánchez	5	3
(China) J Zheng	3	6	3
(Russia) M Kirilenko	6	3	6
(Czech Republic) L Šafářová	6	6
Q	(Poland) U Radwańska	3	4

Second round
5	(France) M Bartoli	6	6
(Spain) A Medina Garrigues	2	0
(Bulgaria) T Pironkova	6	6
(Germany) A Kerber	4	1
14	(Russia) S Kuznetsova	6	6
(Russia) M Kirilenko	4	4
(Czech Republic) L Šafářová	4	6	7^{7}
2	(Denmark) C Wozniacki	6	4	6^{3}

Third round
5	(France) M Bartoli	6	6
(Bulgaria) T Pironkova	3	3
14	(Russia) S Kuznetsova	6^{6}	3
(Czech Republic) L Šafářová	7^{8}	6

Quarterfinals
5	(France) M Bartoli	7	4	6
(Czech Republic) L Šafářová	5	6	1

== Qualifying ==
=== Seeds ===
1. (United States) Vania King (withdrew)
2. (Greece) Eleni Daniilidou (first round)
3. (Canada) Aleksandra Wozniak (qualified)
4. (Poland) Urszula Radwańska (qualified)
5. (United Kingdom) Anne Keothavong (qualified)
6. (Ukraine) Kateryna Bondarenko (qualified)
7. (Russia) Vera Dushevina (qualified)
8. (Netherlands) Arantxa Rus (first round)
9. (Australia) Anastasia Rodionova (withdrew due to being in the Pattaya doubles final)
10. (France) Virginie Razzano (qualified)
11. (Russia) Alla Kudryavtseva (first round)
12. (Germany) Kristina Barrois (qualifying competition)
13. (Australia) Casey Dellacqua (qualifying competition)
14. (Serbia) Bojana Jovanovski (qualifying competition)
15. (United Kingdom) Heather Watson (qualifying competition)
16. (Chinese Taipei) Chang Kai-chen (qualifying competition)

=== Qualifiers ===
1. (France) Virginie Razzano
2. (United States) Varvara Lepchenko
3. (Canada) Aleksandra Wozniak
4. (Poland) Urszula Radwańska
5. (United Kingdom) Anne Keothavong
6. (Ukraine) Kateryna Bondarenko
7. (Russia) Vera Dushevina
8. (France) Caroline Garcia

=== Draw ===
==== First qualifier ====
First round
1	(United States) Vania King
(Japan) Misaki Doi	w/o
WC	(Czech Republic) Vladimíra Uhlířová	1	4
10	(France) Virginie Razzano	6	6

Qualifying competition
(Japan) Misaki Doi	2	5
10	(France) Virginie Razzano	6	7

==== Second qualifier ====
First round
2	(Greece) Eleni Daniilidou	4	5
(United States) Varvara Lepchenko	6	7
(Ukraine) Olga Savchuk	3	1
16	(Chinese Taipei) Chang Kai-chen	6	6

Qualifying competition
(United States) Varvara Lepchenko	6	6
16	(Chinese Taipei) Chang Kai-chen	1	3

==== Third qualifier ====
First round
3	(Canada) Aleksandra Wozniak	6	6
(Japan) Kurumi Nara	1	1
(United States) Raquel Kops-Jones	3	5
14	(Serbia) Bojana Jovanovski	6	7

Qualifying competition
3	(Canada) Aleksandra Wozniak	6	6
14	(Serbia) Bojana Jovanovski	3	2

==== Fourth qualifier ====
First round
4	(Poland) Urszula Radwańska	6	1
(Ukraine) Lesia Tsurenko	2	0^{r}
(Slovenia) Andreja Klepač	6	5	6
11	(Russia) Alla Kudryavtseva	1	7	4

Qualifying competition
4	(Poland) Urszula Radwańska	6	5	6
(Slovenia) Andreja Klepač	2	7	4

==== Fifth qualifier ====
First round
5	(United Kingdom) Anne Keothavong	6	6
(United Kingdom) Laura Robson	1	1
WC	(Poland) Klaudia Jans-Ignacik	2	1
15	(United Kingdom) Heather Watson	6	6

Qualifying competition
5	(United Kingdom) Anne Keothavong	6	6
15	(United Kingdom) Heather Watson	4	4

==== Sixth qualifier ====
First round
6	(Ukraine) Kateryna Bondarenko	6	6
(France) Alizé Lim	1	3
(Ukraine) Veronika Kapshay	3	1
13	(Australia) Casey Dellacqua	6	6

Qualifying competition
6	(Ukraine) Kateryna Bondarenko	6	6
13	(Australia) Casey Dellacqua	3	1

==== Seventh qualifier ====
First round
7	(Russia) Vera Dushevina	6	7^{7}
(United States) Abigail Spears	3	6^{3}
(France) Kristina Mladenovic	4	2
12	(Germany) Kristina Barrois	6	6

Qualifying competition
7	(Russia) Vera Dushevina	6	6
12	(Germany) Kristina Barrois	3	1

==== Eighth qualifier ====
First round
8	(Netherlands) Arantxa Rus	4	3
(France) Caroline Garcia	6	6
(South Africa) Natalie Grandin	w/o
9	(Australia) Anastasia Rodionova

Qualifying competition
(France) Caroline Garcia	6	6
(South Africa) Natalie Grandin	3	4
