= 2012 Brisbane International – Women's singles =

Coordinates: 27°31′30″S 153°0′26″E

Women's singles
- 2012 Brisbane International

Final
- Champion: (Estonia) Kaia Kanepi
- Runner-up: (Slovakia) Daniela Hantuchová
- Score: 6–2, 6–1

Details
- Draw: 32
- Seeds: 8

Events
Singles	men	women
Doubles	men	women
- Brisbane International

Petra Kvitová was the defending champion, but she decided to play at the Hopman Cup instead.

Kaia Kanepi won the title, defeating Daniela Hantuchová in the final 6–2, 6–1.

== Seeds ==
1. (Australia) Samantha Stosur (second round)
2. (Germany) Andrea Petkovic (quarterfinals)
3. (Italy) Francesca Schiavone (semifinals)
4. (United States) Serena Williams (quarterfinals, withdrew due to left ankle sprain)
5. (Belgium) Kim Clijsters (semifinals, retired due to left hip flexor injury)
6. (Serbia) Jelena Janković (quarterfinals)
7. (Russia) Anastasia Pavlyuchenkova (second round)
8. (Slovakia) Dominika Cibulková (first round)

== Draw ==
Key

- Q = Qualifier
- WC = Wild card
- LL = Lucky loser
- Alt = Alternate
- ITF = ITF entry
- PR = Protected ranking
- SR = Special ranking
- SE = Special exempt
- JE = Junior exempt
- JR = Junior Accelerator Programme entrant
- CO = College Accelerator Programme entrant
- NG = Next Gen Accelerator Program entrant
- w/o = Walkover
- r = Retired
- d = Defaulted

=== Finals ===
Semifinals
5	(Belgium) Kim Clijsters	7^{7}	1^{r}
(Slovakia) Daniela Hantuchová	6^{4}	3
3	(Italy) Francesca Schiavone	3	0
(Estonia) Kaia Kanepi	6	6

Final
(Slovakia) Daniela Hantuchová	2	1
(Estonia) Kaia Kanepi	6	6

=== Top half ===
First round
1	(Australia) S Stosur	6	6
(Belarus) A Yakimova	2	3
(Czech Republic) I Benešová	2	7	7
(Czech Republic) L Šafářová	6	5	5
(Austria) T Paszek	3	3
(Serbia) A Ivanovic	6	6
(Romania) S Halep	1	4
5	(Belgium) K Clijsters	6	6
4	(United States) S Williams	6	6
(South Africa) C Scheepers	2	3
WC	(Australia) C Dellacqua	4	2
(Serbia) B Jovanovski	6	6
Q	(United States) V King	6	6
PR	(Hungary) M Czink	3	4
(Slovakia) D Hantuchová	3	6	6
8	(Slovakia) D Cibulková	6	4	3

Second round
1	(Australia) S Stosur	4	2
(Czech Republic) I Benešová	6	6
(Serbia) A Ivanovic	1	6	3
5	(Belgium) K Clijsters	6	1	6
4	(United States) S Williams	6	6
(Serbia) B Jovanovski	2	4
Q	(United States) V King	6	2	3
(Slovakia) D Hantuchová	4	6	6

Quarterfinals
(Czech Republic) I Benešová	3	2
5	(Belgium) K Clijsters	6	6
4	(United States) S Williams
(Slovakia) D Hantuchová	w/o

Semifinals
5	(Belgium) K Clijsters	7^{7}	1^{r}
(Slovakia) D Hantuchová	6^{4}	3

=== Bottom half ===
First round
6	(Serbia) J Janković	6	6
(Spain) C Suárez Navarro	4	2
(Czech Republic) K Zakopalová	6	4	5
Q	(Russia) N Bratchikova	1	6	7
(Kazakhstan) G Voskoboeva	6	6
Q	(Russia) V Dushevina	0	0
(Kazakhstan) K Pervak	4^{r}
3	(Italy) F Schiavone	4
7	(Russia) A Pavlyuchenkova	6	4
(Slovenia) P Hercog	1	1^{r}
Q	(Russia) A Panova	5	6	2
(Estonia) K Kanepi	7	3	6
WC	(Australia) O Rogowska	2	6	4
(Czech Republic) B Záhlavová-Strýcová	6	4	6
(Israel) S Pe'er	6^{2}	6	3
2	(Germany) A Petkovic	7^{7}	1	6

Second round
6	(Serbia) J Janković	6	6
Q	(Russia) N Bratchikova	3	2
(Kazakhstan) G Voskoboeva	4	4
3	(Italy) F Schiavone	6	6
7	(Russia) A Pavlyuchenkova	0	3
(Estonia) K Kanepi	6	6
(Czech Republic) B Záhlavová-Strýcová	6^{2}	0
2	(Germany) A Petkovic	7^{7}	6

Quarterfinals
6	(Serbia) J Janković	7	6^{2}	3
3	(Italy) F Schiavone	5	7^{7}	6
(Estonia) K Kanepi	6	7^{9}
2	(Germany) A Petkovic	1	6^{7}

Semifinals
3	(Italy) F Schiavone	3	0
(Estonia) K Kanepi	6	6

== Qualifying ==
=== Seeds ===
1. (United States) Vania King (qualified)
2. (Netherlands) Arantxa Rus (first round)
3. (Russia) Vera Dushevina (qualified)
4. (Georgia (country)) Anna Tatishvili (qualifying competition)
5. (Greece) Eleni Daniilidou (second round)
6. (Netherlands) Michaëlla Krajicek (first round)
7. (United States) Sloane Stephens (first round)
8. (Austria) Patricia Mayr-Achleitner (first round)

=== Qualifiers ===
1. (United States) Vania King
2. (Russia) Nina Bratchikova
3. (Russia) Vera Dushevina
4. (Russia) Alexandra Panova

=== Qualifying draw ===
==== First qualifier ====
First round
1	(United States) Vania King	6	6
WC	(Australia) Ashleigh Barty	1	2
(Australia) Anastasia Rodionova	6	6
(Hungary) Réka-Luca Jani	3	4
(Switzerland) Stefanie Vögele	6	6
WC	(Australia) Sally Peers	4	2
(Uzbekistan) Akgul Amanmuradova	6	6
8	(Austria) Patricia Mayr-Achleitner	3	2

Second round
1	(United States) Vania King	7^{7}	6
(Australia) Anastasia Rodionova	6^{1}	1
(Switzerland) Stefanie Vögele	6	0
(Uzbekistan) Akgul Amanmuradova	2	0^{r}

Qualifying competition
1	(United States) Vania King	7	4	6
(Switzerland) Stefanie Vögele	5	6	0

==== Second qualifier ====
First round
2	(Netherlands) Arantxa Rus	6	6^{5}	4
(Spain) Arantxa Parra Santonja	2	7^{7}	6
(Luxembourg) Mandy Minella	6	6
Alt	(Colombia) Mariana Duque Mariño	2	3
WC	(Australia) Bojana Bobusic	1	6^{5}
(Russia) Nina Bratchikova	6	7^{7}
(Russia) Anastasia Pivovarova	6^{7}	7	3
5	(Greece) Eleni Daniilidou	7^{9}	5	6

Second round
(Spain) Arantxa Parra Santonja	4	7	1
(Luxembourg) Mandy Minella	6	5	6
(Russia) Nina Bratchikova	6	6^{6}	6
5	(Greece) Eleni Daniilidou	2	7^{8}	1

Qualifying competition
(Luxembourg) Mandy Minella	6	4	1
(Russia) Nina Bratchikova	2	6	6

==== Third qualifier ====
First round
3	(Russia) Vera Dushevina	6	6
WC	(Australia) Isabella Holland	3	4
(Japan) Misaki Doi	6	5	2
(Italy) Karin Knapp	3	7	6
(Croatia) Mirjana Lučić-Baroni	6	3	0
(Ukraine) Lesia Tsurenko	4	6	6
(France) Kristina Mladenovic	7	6^{8}	6
6	(Netherlands) Michaëlla Krajicek	5	7^{10}	2

Second round
3	(Russia) Vera Dushevina	6	6
(Italy) Karin Knapp	3	4
(Ukraine) Lesia Tsurenko	4	7	7^{8}
(France) Kristina Mladenovic	6	5	6^{6}

Qualifying competition
3	(Russia) Vera Dushevina	6	5	6
(Ukraine) Lesia Tsurenko	4	7	2

==== Fourth qualifier ====
First round
4	(Georgia (country)) Anna Tatishvili	7^{7}	2	7
(Australia) Monique Adamczak	6^{5}	6	5
(Chinese Taipei) Chang Kai-chen	4	2
(Kazakhstan) Sesil Karatantcheva	6	6
(United States) Chichi Scholl	5	3
(Russia) Alexandra Panova	7	6
(Austria) Yvonne Meusburger	7^{7}	6
7	(United States) Sloane Stephens	6^{3}	3

Second round
4	(Georgia (country)) Anna Tatishvili	7^{7}	4	7^{7}
(Kazakhstan) Sesil Karatantcheva	6^{2}	6	6^{2}
(Russia) Alexandra Panova	6	6
(Austria) Yvonne Meusburger	3	4

Qualifying competition
4	(Georgia (country)) Anna Tatishvili	0	1
(Russia) Alexandra Panova	6	6
