= 2012 Brisbane International – Men's doubles =

Coordinates: 27°31′30″S 153°0′26″E

Men's doubles
- 2012 Brisbane International

Final
- Champions: (Belarus) Max Mirnyi (Canada) Daniel Nestor
- Runners-up: (Austria) Jürgen Melzer (Germany) Philipp Petzschner
- Score: 6–1, 6–2

Events
Singles	men	women
Doubles	men	women
- Brisbane International

Lukáš Dlouhý and Paul Hanley were the defending champions but decided not to participate together.
Dlouhý played alongside Marcelo Melo (lost in the first round to Tommy Haas and Radek Štěpánek), while Hanley partnered up with Jamie Murray (eliminated in the Quarterfinals to Robert Lindstedt and Horia Tecău).

First seeds Max Mirnyi and Daniel Nestor won the title, defeating second seeds Jürgen Melzer and Philipp Petzschner in the final.

== Seeds ==
1. (Belarus) Max Mirnyi / (Canada) Daniel Nestor (champions)
2. (Austria) Jürgen Melzer / (Germany) Philipp Petzschner (final)
3. (Sweden) Robert Lindstedt / (Romania) Horia Tecău (semifinals)
4. (Pakistan) Aisam-ul-Haq Qureshi / (Curaçao) Jean-Julien Rojer (first round)

== Draw ==
Key

- Q = Qualifier
- WC = Wild card
- LL = Lucky loser
- Alt = Alternate
- ITF = ITF entry
- PR = Protected ranking
- SR = Special ranking
- SE = Special exempt
- JE = Junior exempt
- JR = Junior Accelerator Programme entrant
- CO = College Accelerator Programme entrant
- NG = Next Gen Accelerator Program entrant
- w/o = Walkover
- r = Retired
- d = Defaulted

First round
1	(Belarus) M Mirnyi (Canada) D Nestor	1	6	[12]
WC	(Australia) M Ebden (Australia) C Guccione	6	3	[10]
(Germany) T Haas (Czech Republic) R Štěpánek	6	7^{7}
(Czech Republic) L Dlouhý (Brazil) M Melo	1	6^{2}
3	(Sweden) R Lindstedt (Romania) H Tecău	6	6
(Ukraine) A Dolgopolov (Ukraine) D Molchanov	4	4
(Austria) O Marach (Austria) A Peya	2	3
(Australia) P Hanley (United Kingdom) J Murray	6	6
(France) N Mahut (France) G Simon	5	7^{7}	[4]
(Poland) M Fyrstenberg (Slovakia) M Mertiňák	7	6^{3}	[10]
WC	(Australia) G Jones (Australia) M Matosevic	6	6
4	(Pakistan) A-u-H Qureshi (Curaçao) J-J Rojer	2	4
(Cyprus) M Baghdatis (United Kingdom) A Murray	6	6
(Colombia) S Giraldo (Japan) K Nishikori	2	2
(United States) E Butorac (Brazil) B Soares	4	6^{3}
2	(Austria) J Melzer (Germany) P Petzschner	6	7^{7}

Quarterfinals
1	(Belarus) M Mirnyi (Canada) D Nestor	w/o
(Germany) T Haas (Czech Republic) R Štěpánek
3	(Sweden) R Lindstedt (Romania) H Tecău	7	6
(Australia) P Hanley (United Kingdom) J Murray	5	3
(Poland) M Fyrstenberg (Slovakia) M Mertiňák	6	7
WC	(Australia) G Jones (Australia) M Matosevic	2	5
(Cyprus) M Baghdatis (United Kingdom) A Murray	6	3	[13]
2	(Austria) J Melzer (Germany) P Petzschner	3	6	[15]

Semifinals
1	(Belarus) M Mirnyi (Canada) D Nestor	6	7^{7}
3	(Sweden) R Lindstedt (Romania) H Tecău	2	6^{3}
(Poland) M Fyrstenberg (Slovakia) M Mertiňák	6^{1}	3
2	(Austria) J Melzer (Germany) P Petzschner	7^{7}	6

Final
1	(Belarus) M Mirnyi (Canada) D Nestor	6	6
2	(Austria) J Melzer (Germany) P Petzschner	1	2
