= 2012 WTA Tour Championships – Doubles =

Doubles
- 2012 WTA Tour Championships

Final
- Champions: (Russia) Maria Kirilenko (Russia) Nadia Petrova
- Runners-up: (Czech Republic) Andrea Hlaváčková (Czech Republic) Lucie Hradecká
- Score: 6–1, 6–4

Details
- Draw: 4
- Seeds: 4

Events
Singles	Doubles
- WTA Tour Championships

Maria Kirilenko and Nadia Petrova defeated Andrea Hlaváčková and Lucie Hradecká in the final, 6–1, 6–4 to win the doubles tennis title at the 2012 WTA Tour Championships.

Liezel Huber and Lisa Raymond were the defending champions, but were defeated by Hlaváčková and Hradecká in the semifinals.

== Seeds ==
1. (Italy) Sara Errani / (Italy) Roberta Vinci (semifinals)
2. (Czech Republic) Andrea Hlaváčková / (Czech Republic) Lucie Hradecká (final)
3. (United States) Liezel Huber / (United States) Lisa Raymond (semifinals)
4. (Russia) Maria Kirilenko / (Russia) Nadia Petrova (champions)

== Draw ==
Key

- Q = Qualifier
- WC = Wild card
- LL = Lucky loser
- Alt = Alternate
- ITF = ITF entry
- PR = Protected ranking
- SR = Special ranking
- SE = Special exempt
- JE = Junior exempt
- JR = Junior Accelerator Programme entrant
- CO = College Accelerator Programme entrant
- NG = Next Gen Accelerator Program entrant
- w/o = Walkover
- r = Retired
- d = Defaulted

=== Finals ===
Semifinals
1	(Italy) Sara Errani (Italy) Roberta Vinci	6	3	[4]
4	(Russia) Maria Kirilenko (Russia) Nadia Petrova	1	6	[10]
3	(United States) Liezel Huber (United States) Lisa Raymond	6^{6}	1
2	(Czech Republic) Andrea Hlaváčková (Czech Republic) Lucie Hradecká	7^{8}	6

Final
4	(Russia) Maria Kirilenko (Russia) Nadia Petrova	6	6
2	(Czech Republic) Andrea Hlaváčková (Czech Republic) Lucie Hradecká	1	4
