= 2012 WTA Tour Championships – Singles =

Singles
- 2012 WTA Tour Championships

Final
- Champion: (United States) Serena Williams
- Runner-up: (Russia) Maria Sharapova
- Score: 6–4, 6–3

Details
- Draw: 8 (RR + elimination)
- Seeds: 8

Events
Singles	Doubles
- WTA Tour Championships

Serena Williams defeated Maria Sharapova in the final, 6–4, 6–3 to win the singles tennis title at the 2012 WTA Tour Championships. It was her third singles title at the event and she did not lose a set during the tournament.

This is the most recent edition of the event where the final was a rematch of a previous edition's final; Williams and Sharapova also contested the 2004 final, which Sharapova won. The 2012 edition was the first such event since the 1998 and 1999 editions, when Martina Hingis and Lindsay Davenport contested multiple finals of the WTA Tour Championships.

Petra Kvitová was the defending champion, but withdrew after her first match due to nasopharyngitis.

Angelique Kerber and Sara Errani made their debuts at the event.

== Players ==
1. (Belarus) Victoria Azarenka (semifinals)
2. (Russia) Maria Sharapova (final)
3. (United States) Serena Williams (champion)
4. (Poland) Agnieszka Radwańska (semifinals)
5. (Germany) Angelique Kerber (round robin)
6. (Czech Republic) Petra Kvitová (round robin, withdrew because of nasopharyngitis)
7. (Italy) Sara Errani (round robin)
8. (China) Li Na (round robin)

== Alternates ==
1. (Australia) Samantha Stosur (round robin, Replaced Kvitová)
2. (France) Marion Bartoli (Not Used)

== Draw ==
Key

- Q = Qualifier
- WC = Wild card
- LL = Lucky loser
- Alt = Alternate
- ITF = ITF entry
- PR = Protected ranking
- SR = Special ranking
- SE = Special exempt
- JE = Junior exempt
- JR = Junior Accelerator Programme entrant
- CO = College Accelerator Programme entrant
- NG = Next Gen Accelerator Program entrant
- w/o = Walkover
- r = Retired
- d = Defaulted

=== Finals ===
Semifinals
3	(United States) Serena Williams	6	6
4	(Poland) Agnieszka Radwańska	2	1
2	(Russia) Maria Sharapova	6	6
1	(Belarus) Victoria Azarenka	4	2

Final
3	(United States) Serena Williams	6	6
2	(Russia) Maria Sharapova	4	3

=== Red group ===
		(Belarus) Azarenka	(United States) Williams	(Germany) Kerber	(China) Li	RR W–L	Set W–L	Game W–L	Standings
1	(Belarus) Victoria Azarenka		4–6, 4–6	6–7^{(11–13)}, 7–6^{(7–2)}, 6–4	7–6 ^{(7–4)}, 6–3	2–1	4–3 (57.1%)	40–38 (51.3%)	2
3	(United States) Serena Williams	6–4, 6–4		6–4, 6–1	7–6^{(7–2)}, 6–3	3–0	6–0 (100%)	37–22 (62.7%)	1
5	(Germany) Angelique Kerber	7–6^{(13–11)}, 6–7^{(2–7)}, 4–6	4–6, 1–6		4–6, 3–6	0–3	1–6 (14.3%)	29–43 (41.5%)	4
8	(China) Li Na	6–7^{(4–7)}, 3–6	6–7^{(2–7)}, 3–6	6–4, 6–3		1–2	2–4 (33.3%)	30–33 (47.6%)	3

Standings are determined by: 1. number of wins; 2. number of matches; 3. in two-players-ties, head-to-head records; 4. in three-players-ties, percentage of sets won, or of games won; 5. steering-committee decision.

=== White group ===
		(Russia) Sharapova	(Poland) Radwańska	(Czech Republic) Kvitová (Australia) Stosur	(Italy) Errani	RR W–L	Set W–L	Game W–L	Standings
2	(Russia) Maria Sharapova		5–7, 7–5, 7–5	6–0, 6–3 (w/ Stosur)	6–3, 6–2	3–0	6–1 (85.7%)	43–25 (63.2%)	1
4	(Poland) Agnieszka Radwańska	7–5, 5–7, 5–7		6–3, 6–2 (w/ Kvitová)	6–7^{(6–8)}, 7–5, 6–4	2–1	5–3 (62.5%)	48–40 (54.5%)	2
6; 9	(Czech Republic) Petra Kvitová (Australia) Samantha Stosur	(w/ Stosur); 0–6, 3–6	3–6, 2–6 (w/ Kvitová)		(w/ Stosur); 3–6, 6–2, 0–6	0–1; 0–2	0–2 (0%); 1–4 (20%)	5–12 (29.4%); 12–26 (31.6%)	X 4
7	(Italy) Sara Errani	3–6, 2–6	7–6^{(8–6)}, 5–7, 4–6	6–3, 2–6, 6–0 (w/ Stosur)		1–2	3–5 (37.5%)	35–40 (46.7%)	3

Standings are determined by: 1. number of wins; 2. number of matches; 3. in two-players-ties, head-to-head records; 4. in three-players-ties, percentage of sets won, or of games won; 5. steering-committee decision.
