= 2012 Qatar Total Open – Doubles =

Doubles
- 2012 Qatar Total Open

Final
- Champions: (United States) Liezel Huber (United States) Lisa Raymond
- Runners-up: (United States) Raquel Kops-Jones (United States) Abigail Spears
- Score: 6–3, 6–1

Events
Singles	Doubles
← 2011 ·	Qatar Total Open	· 2013 →

Květa Peschke and Katarina Srebotnik were the defending champions, but chose not to participate this year.
Liezel Huber and Lisa Raymond defeated Raquel Kops-Jones and Abigail Spears 6–3, 6–1 in the final.

== Seeds ==
The top six seeds received bye to the second round.

1. (United States) Liezel Huber / (United States) Lisa Raymond (champions)
2. (India) Sania Mirza / (Russia) Elena Vesnina (second round)
3. (Slovakia) Daniela Hantuchová / (Poland) Agnieszka Radwańska (second round)
4. (Russia) Maria Kirilenko / (Germany) Sabine Lisicki (quarterfinals)
5. (Spain) Nuria Llagostera Vives / (Australia) Anastasia Rodionova (semifinals)
6. (South Africa) Natalie Grandin / (Czech Republic) Vladimíra Uhlířová (second round)
7. (Germany) Julia Görges / (China) Zheng Jie (quarterfinals)
8. (Czech Republic) Iveta Benešová / (Czech Republic) Barbora Záhlavová-Strýcová (second round)

== Draw ==
=== Key ===
- Q = Qualifier
- WC = Wild card
- LL = Lucky loser
- Alt = Alternate
- SE = Special exempt
- PR = Protected ranking
- ITF = ITF entry
- JE = Junior exempt
- w/o = Walkover
- r = Retired
- d = Defaulted
- SR = Special ranking

=== Finals ===
Semifinals
1	(United States) Liezel Huber (United States) Lisa Raymond	6	6
(Germany) Kristina Barrois (Germany) Anna-Lena Grönefeld	2	3
5	(Spain) Nuria Llagostera Vives (Australia) Anastasia Rodionova	6	1	[8]
(United States) Raquel Kops-Jones (United States) Abigail Spears	3	6	[10]

Final
1	(United States) Liezel Huber (United States) Lisa Raymond	6	6
(United States) Raquel Kops-Jones (United States) Abigail Spears	3	1

=== Top half ===
First round
(Chinese Taipei) H-c Chan (Japan) R Fujiwara	6	7
(Slovenia) P Hercog (Spain) MJ Martínez Sánchez	1	5
(United States) J Craybas (South Africa) C Scheepers	1	3
(Russia) A Kudryavtseva (Czech Republic) K Zakopalová	6	6
WC	(Oman) F Al Nabhani (Tunisia) O Jabeur	4	2
7	(Germany) J Görges (China) J Zheng	6	6
(Poland) U Radwańska (Ukraine) O Savchuk
(Germany) K Barrois (Germany) A-L Grönefeld	w/o
(Poland) K Jans-Ignacik (France) K Mladenovic	6	6
(Chinese Taipei) S-w Hsieh (China) S Peng	3	2
(Australia) C Dellacqua (Australia) S Stosur	2	3
8	(Czech Republic) I Benešová (Czech Republic) B Záhlavová-Strýcová	6	6

Second round
1	(United States) L Huber (United States) L Raymond	6	4	[10]
(Chinese Taipei) H-c Chan (Japan) R Fujiwara	3	6	[6]
(Russia) A Kudryavtseva (Czech Republic) K Zakopalová	4	2
7	(Germany) J Görges (China) J Zheng	6	6
3	(Slovakia) D Hantuchová (Poland) A Radwańska	1	2
(Germany) K Barrois (Germany) A-L Grönefeld	6	6
(Poland) K Jans-Ignacik (France) K Mladenovic	3	7^{7}	[10]
8	(Czech Republic) I Benešová (Czech Republic) B Záhlavová-Strýcová	6	6^{5}	[7]

Quarterfinals
1	(United States) L Huber (United States) L Raymond	6^{2}	7^{7}	[11]
7	(Germany) J Görges (China) J Zheng	7^{7}	6^{3}	[9]
(Germany) K Barrois (Germany) A-L Grönefeld	6	6
(Poland) K Jans-Ignacik (France) K Mladenovic	2	3

Semifinals
1	(United States) L Huber (United States) L Raymond	6	6
(Germany) K Barrois (Germany) A-L Grönefeld	2	3

=== Bottom half ===
First round
(Romania) S Cîrstea (United Kingdom) A Keothanvong	6	2	[2]
(Spain) A Medina Garrigues (Russia) A Pavlyuchenkova	2	6	[10]
(Slovenia) A Klepač (Poland) A Rosolska	6	6
(Serbia) B Jovanovski (Morocco) N Lalami	3	1
(Greece) E Daniilidou (Romania) M Niculescu	1	1
(United States) R Kops-Jones (United States) A Spears	6	6
(Russia) V Dushevina (Israel) S Pe'er	6	5	[10]
(Italy) F Pennetta (Italy) F Schiavone	2	7	[7]

Second round
5	(Spain) N Llagostera Vives (Australia) A Rodionova	4	6	[11]
(Spain) A Medina Garrigues (Russia) A Pavlyuchenkova	6	4	[9]
(Slovenia) A Klepač (Poland) A Rosolska	2	6	[8]
4	(Russia) M Kirilenko (Germany) S Lisicki	6	4	[10]
6	(South Africa) N Grandin (Czech Republic) V Uhlířová	4	6	[9]
(United States) R Kops-Jones (United States) A Spears	6	3	[11]
(Russia) V Dushevina (Israel) S Pe'er	6	6
2	(India) S Mirza (Russia) E Vesnina	4	4

Quarterfinals
5	(Spain) N Llagostera Vives (Australia) A Rodionova	6	6^{3}	[10]
4	(Russia) M Kirilenko (Germany) S Lisicki	4	7^{7}	[7]
(United States) R Kops-Jones (United States) A Spears	6	7
(Russia) V Dushevina (Israel) S Pe'er	0	6^{5}

Semifinals
5	(Spain) N Llagostera Vives (Australia) A Rodionova	6	1	[8]
(United States) R Kops-Jones (United States) A Spears	3	6	[10]
