= 2012 Porsche Tennis Grand Prix – Doubles =

Women's tennis tournament

Doubles
- 2012 Porsche Tennis Grand Prix

Final
- Champions: (Czech Republic) Iveta Benešová (Czech Republic) Barbora Záhlavová-Strýcová
- Runners-up: (Germany) Julia Görges (Germany) Anna-Lena Grönefeld
- Score: 6–4, 7–5

Details
- Draw: 16
- Seeds: 4

Events
Singles	Doubles
- Porsche Tennis Grand Prix

Sabine Lisicki and Samantha Stosur were the defending champions but decided not to participate.
Iveta Benešová and Barbora Záhlavová-Strýcová won the tournament defeating Julia Görges and Anna-Lena Grönefeld 6–4, 7–5 in the final.

== Seeds ==
1. (Czech Republic) Květa Peschke / (Slovenia) Katarina Srebotnik (semifinals)
2. (India) Sania Mirza / (Italy) Flavia Pennetta (withdrew due to Pennetta's wrist injury)
3. (China) Peng Shuai / (Russia) Elena Vesnina (first round)
4. (South Africa) Natalie Grandin / (Czech Republic) Vladimíra Uhlířová (first round)
5. (Czech Republic) Iveta Benešová / (Czech Republic) Barbora Záhlavová-Strýcová (champion)

== Draw ==
Key

- Q = Qualifier
- WC = Wild card
- LL = Lucky loser
- Alt = Alternate
- ITF = ITF entry
- PR = Protected ranking
- SR = Special ranking
- SE = Special exempt
- JE = Junior exempt
- JR = Junior Accelerator Programme entrant
- CO = College Accelerator Programme entrant
- NG = Next Gen Accelerator Program entrant
- w/o = Walkover
- r = Retired
- d = Defaulted

=== Draw ===
First round
1	(Czech Republic) K Peschke (Slovenia) K Srebotnik	6	6
(Slovenia) A Klepač (Poland) A Rosolska	0	2
WC	(Italy) F Schiavone (Italy) R Vinci	1	4
(Germany) K Barrois (Germany) J Wöhr	6	6
3	(China) S Peng (Russia) E Vesnina	6^{2}	1
(Germany) J Görges (Germany) A-L Grönefeld	7^{7}	6
WC	(Germany) A Kerber (Germany) A Petkovic	4	5
(Russia) A Pavlyuchenkova (Czech Republic) L Šafářová	6	7
WC	(Germany) M Barthel (Germany) T Malek	2	5
(Poland) K Jans-Ignacik (China) S Zhang	6	7
(Argentina) G Dulko (Argentina) P Suárez	7^{7}	6
4	(South Africa) N Grandin (Czech Republic) V Uhlířová	6^{4}	4
Alt	(Chinese Taipei) H-c Chan (Japan) R Fujiwara	2	3
(Spain) N Llagostera Vives (Romania) M Niculescu	6	6
(Australia) J Gajdošová (Slovakia) D Hantuchová	3	2
5	(Czech Republic) I Benešová (Czech Republic) B Záhlavová-Strýcová	6	6

Quarterfinals
1	(Czech Republic) K Peschke (Slovenia) K Srebotnik	6	6
(Germany) K Barrois (Germany) J Wöhr	2	3
(Germany) J Görges (Germany) A-L Grönefeld	6	7
(Russia) A Pavlyuchenkova (Czech Republic) L Šafářová	4	5
(Poland) K Jans-Ignacik (China) S Zhang	4	3
(Argentina) G Dulko (Argentina) P Suárez	6	6
(Spain) N Llagostera Vives (Romania) M Niculescu	6	4	[8]
5	(Czech Republic) I Benešová (Czech Republic) B Záhlavová-Strýcová	1	6	[10]

Semifinals
1	(Czech Republic) K Peschke (Slovenia) K Srebotnik	4	2
(Germany) J Görges (Germany) A-L Grönefeld	6	6
(Argentina) G Dulko (Argentina) P Suárez
5	(Czech Republic) I Benešová (Czech Republic) B Záhlavová-Strýcová	w/o

Final
(Germany) J Görges (Germany) A-L Grönefeld	4	5
5	(Czech Republic) I Benešová (Czech Republic) B Záhlavová-Strýcová	6	7
