= 2012 Brisbane International – Women's doubles =

Coordinates: 27°31′30″S 153°0′26″E

Women's doubles
- 2012 Brisbane International

Final
- Champions: (Spain) Nuria Llagostera Vives (Spain) Arantxa Parra Santonja
- Runners-up: (United States) Raquel Kops-Jones (United States) Abigail Spears
- Score: 7–6^{(7–2)}, 7–6^{(7–2)}

Details
- Draw: 16
- Seeds: 4

Events
Singles	men	women
Doubles	men	women
- Brisbane International

Alisa Kleybanova and Anastasia Pavlyuchenkova were the defending champions but decided not to participate.

The fourth-seeded Spanish couple Nuria Llagostera Vives and Arantxa Parra Santonja won the tournament beating Americans Raquel Kops-Jones and Abigail Spears in the final, 7–6^{(7–2)}, 7–6^{(7–2)}.

== Seeds ==
1. (South Africa) Natalie Grandin / (Czech Republic) Vladimíra Uhlířová (first round)
2. (Czech Republic) Iveta Benešová / (Czech Republic) Barbora Záhlavová-Strýcová (semifinals)
3. (Chinese Taipei) Hsieh Su-wei / (Kazakhstan) Galina Voskoboeva (first round)
4. (Spain) Nuria Llagostera Vives / (Spain) Arantxa Parra Santonja (champions)

== Draw ==
Key

- Q = Qualifier
- WC = Wild card
- LL = Lucky loser
- Alt = Alternate
- ITF = ITF entry
- PR = Protected ranking
- SR = Special ranking
- SE = Special exempt
- JE = Junior exempt
- JR = Junior Accelerator Programme entrant
- CO = College Accelerator Programme entrant
- NG = Next Gen Accelerator Program entrant
- w/o = Walkover
- r = Retired
- d = Defaulted

=== Draw ===
First round
1	(South Africa) N Grandin (Czech Republic) V Uhlířová	1	7	[11]
WC	(Australia) A Barty (Australia) C Dellacqua	6	5	[13]
(Slovenia) A Klepač (Poland) A Rosolska	6	6^{4}	[10]
(Georgia (country)) A Tatishvili (Czech Republic) K Zakopalová	3	7^{7}	[3]
3	(Chinese Taipei) S-w Hsieh (Kazakhstan) G Voskoboeva	5	6	[4]
Alt	(Russia) N Bratchikova (France) K Mladenovic	7	3	[10]
(United States) R Kops-Jones (United States) A Spears	6	6^{1}	[10]
WC	(Serbia) J Janković (Germany) A Petkovic	4	7^{7}	[7]
(Russia) V Dushevina (Israel) S Pe'er	3	6	[11]
WC	(Slovakia) D Cibulková (Slovakia) J Husárová	6	4	[9]
(Slovakia) D Hantuchová (Italy) F Schiavone	4	3
4	(Spain) N Llagostera Vives (Spain) A Parra Santonja	6	6
(Australia) An Rodionova (Russia) Ar Rodionova	1	0
(Poland) K Jans-Ignacik (Bosnia and Herzegovina) M Jugić-Salkić	6	6
(United States) V King (Netherlands) M Krajicek	7^{8}	4	[9]
2	(Czech Republic) I Benešová (Czech Republic) B Záhlavová-Strýcová	6^{6}	6	[11]

Quarterfinals
WC	(Australia) A Barty (Australia) C Dellacqua	6	6
(Slovenia) A Klepač (Poland) A Rosolska	2	2
Alt	(Russia) N Bratchikova (France) K Mladenovic	4	7^{7}	[7]
(United States) R Kops-Jones (United States) A Spears	6	6^{4}	[10]
(Russia) V Dushevina (Israel) S Pe'er	5	7^{7}	[8]
4	(Spain) N Llagostera Vives (Spain) A Parra Santonja	7	6^{5}	[10]
(Poland) K Jans-Ignacik (Bosnia and Herzegovina) M Jugić-Salkić	1	4
2	(Czech Republic) I Benešová (Czech Republic) B Záhlavová-Strýcová	6	6

Semifinals
WC	(Australia) A Barty (Australia) C Dellacqua	7	6^{3}	[7]
(United States) R Kops-Jones (United States) A Spears	5	7^{7}	[10]
4	(Spain) N Llagostera Vives (Spain) A Parra Santonja	6	6
2	(Czech Republic) I Benešová (Czech Republic) B Záhlavová-Strýcová	2	3

Final
(United States) R Kops-Jones (United States) A Spears	6^{2}	6^{2}
4	(Spain) N Llagostera Vives (Spain) A Parra Santonja	7^{7}	7^{7}
