= 2012 Porsche Tennis Grand Prix – Singles =

Singles
- 2012 Porsche Tennis Grand Prix

Final
- Champion: (Russia) Maria Sharapova
- Runner-up: (Belarus) Victoria Azarenka
- Score: 6–1, 6–4

Events
Singles	Doubles
- Porsche Tennis Grand Prix

Julia Görges was the defending champion, but she lost to Samantha Stosur in the second round.

Maria Sharapova won the title, defeating Victoria Azarenka in the final, 6–1, 6–4. Sharapova won the title after saving a match point in her quarterfinal match against Samantha Stosur.

This tournament was the first since Wimbledon in 2009 in which the top four players in the world reached the semifinals.

== Seeds ==
The top four seeds received a bye into the second round.

1. (Belarus) Victoria Azarenka (final)
2. (Russia) Maria Sharapova (champion)
3. (Czech Republic) Petra Kvitová (semifinals)
4. (Poland) Agnieszka Radwańska (semifinals)
5. (Australia) Samantha Stosur (quarterfinals)
6. (Denmark) Caroline Wozniacki (second round)
7. (France) Marion Bartoli (second round)
8. (China) Li Na (quarterfinals)

== Draw ==
Key

- Q = Qualifier
- WC = Wild card
- LL = Lucky loser
- Alt = Alternate
- ITF = ITF entry
- PR = Protected ranking
- SR = Special ranking
- SE = Special exempt
- JE = Junior exempt
- JR = Junior Accelerator Programme entrant
- CO = College Accelerator Programme entrant
- NG = Next Gen Accelerator Program entrant
- w/o = Walkover
- r = Retired
- d = Defaulted

=== Finals ===
Semifinals
1	(Belarus) Victoria Azarenka	6	6
4	(Poland) Agnieszka Radwańska	1	3
3	(Czech Republic) Petra Kvitová	4	6^{3}
2	(Russia) Maria Sharapova	6	7^{7}

Final
1	(Belarus) Victoria Azarenka	1	4
2	(Russia) Maria Sharapova	6	6

=== Top half ===
First round
WC	(Germany) K Barrois	1	4
(Germany) A Petkovic	6	6
(Serbia) A Ivanovic	5	6^{4}
WC	(Germany) M Barthel	7	7^{7}
Q	(Czech Republic) I Benešová	3	2
7	(France) M Bartoli	6	6
Q	(Hungary) G Arn	7	6
LL	(Ukraine) K Bondarenko	5	3
LL	(Uzbekistan) A Amanmuradova	6	5	6
(Slovakia) D Cibulková	2	7	3
(Czech Republic) L Šafářová	6^{4}	4
8	(China) N Li	7^{7}	6

Second round
1	(Belarus) V Azarenka	6	4
(Germany) A Petkovic	2	4^{r}
WC	(Germany) M Barthel	6	6
7	(France) M Bartoli	3	1
4	(Poland) A Radwańska	6	6
Q	(Hungary) G Arn	3	4
LL	(Uzbekistan) A Amanmuradova	4	4
8	(China) N Li	6	6

Quarterfinals
1	(Belarus) V Azarenka	6	6^{3}	7
WC	(Germany) M Barthel	4	7^{7}	5
4	(Poland) A Radwańska	3	6	6
8	(China) N Li	6	2	3

Semifinals
1	(Belarus) V Azarenka	6	6
4	(Poland) A Radwańska	1	3

=== Bottom half ===
First round
6	(Denmark) C Wozniacki	6	1
(Serbia) J Janković	3	0^{r}
(Germany) A Kerber	6	6
(Italy) R Vinci	2	3
(Italy) F Schiavone	6	7
(Romania) M Niculescu	3	5
5	(Australia) S Stosur	6	6
(China) S Peng	2	2
(Germany) J Görges	5	6	6
(Russia) A Pavlyuchenkova	7	3	4
Q	(France) A Cornet	6	6
Q	(Russia) A Chakvetadze	3	4

Second round
6	(Denmark) C Wozniacki	1	2
(Germany) A Kerber	6	6
(Italy) F Schiavone	2	2
3	(Czech Republic) P Kvitová	6	6
5	(Australia) S Stosur	6	2	6
(Germany) J Görges	2	6	3
Q	(France) A Cornet	3	0^{r}
2	(Russia) M Sharapova	6	1

Quarterfinals
(Germany) A Kerber	4	4
3	(Czech Republic) P Kvitová	6	6
5	(Australia) S Stosur	7^{7}	6^{5}	5
2	(Russia) M Sharapova	6^{5}	7^{7}	7

Semifinals
3	(Czech Republic) P Kvitová	4	6^{3}
2	(Russia) M Sharapova	6	7^{7}

== Qualifying ==
=== Seeds ===
1. (Romania) Sorana Cîrstea (first round)
2. (Bulgaria) Tsvetana Pironkova (first round)
3. (Czech Republic) Iveta Benešová (qualified)
4. (Canada) Aleksandra Wozniak (first round)
5. (Spain) Carla Suárez Navarro (first round)
6. (Czech Republic) Barbora Záhlavová-Strýcová (second round)
7. (Ukraine) Kateryna Bondarenko (qualifying competition, lucky loser)
8. (Hungary) Gréta Arn (qualified)

=== Qualifiers ===
1. (Russia) Anna Chakvetadze
2. (Hungary) Gréta Arn
3. (Czech Republic) Iveta Benešová
4. (France) Alizé Cornet

=== Lucky losers ===
1. (Ukraine) Kateryna Bondarenko
2. (Uzbekistan) Akgul Amanmuradova

=== Draw ===
==== First qualifier ====
First round
1	(Romania) Sorana Cîrstea	1	0
(Russia) Anna Chakvetadze	6	6
(France) Irena Pavlovic	4	7	6
WC	(Germany) Julia Kimmelmann	6	5	3
WC	(Germany) Antonia Lottner	2	6^{4}
WC	(Germany) Anna-Lena Friedsam	6	7^{7}
(Argentina) Gisela Dulko	6	4	4
7	(Ukraine) Kateryna Bondarenko	2	6	6

Second round
(Russia) Anna Chakvetadze	6	3	6
(France) Irena Pavlovic	1	6	3
WC	(Germany) Anna-Lena Friedsam	7^{7}	1	2
7	(Ukraine) Kateryna Bondarenko	6^{5}	6	6

Qualifying competition
(Russia) Anna Chakvetadze	6	7^{7}
7	(Ukraine) Kateryna Bondarenko	3	6^{2}

==== Second qualifier ====
First round
2	(Bulgaria) Tsvetana Pironkova	5	6	5
WC	(Germany) Carina Witthöft	7	3	7
(Austria) Yvonne Meusburger	7^{7}	6
PR	(Hungary) Ágnes Szávay	6^{3}	3
(Kazakhstan) Sesil Karatantcheva	7^{8}	6
(Slovakia) Zuzana Luknárová	6^{6}	3
(China) Zhang Shuai	4	3
8	(Hungary) Gréta Arn	6	6

Second round
WC	(Germany) Carina Witthöft
(Austria) Yvonne Meusburger	w/o
(Kazakhstan) Sesil Karatantcheva	4	6	1
8	(Hungary) Gréta Arn	6	4	6

Qualifying competition
(Austria) Yvonne Meusburger	6^{5}	0
8	(Hungary) Gréta Arn	7^{7}	6

==== Third qualifier ====
First round
3	(Czech Republic) Iveta Benešová	6	6
(Bosnia and Herzegovina) Jasmina Tinjić	1	1
(Italy) Maria Elena Camerin	7	6
(Slovakia) Romana Tabak	5	3
(Germany) Sarah Gronert	6^{3}	6^{3}
(Uzbekistan) Akgul Amanmuradova	7^{7}	7^{7}
(Czech Republic) Sandra Záhlavová	4	2
6	(Czech Republic) Barbora Záhlavová-Strýcová	6	6

Second round
3	(Czech Republic) Iveta Benešová	6	6
(Italy) Maria Elena Camerin	3	2
(Uzbekistan) Akgul Amanmuradova	7^{7}	6
6	(Czech Republic) Barbora Záhlavová-Strýcová	6^{5}	2

Qualifying competition
3	(Czech Republic) Iveta Benešová	6	4	7^{7}
(Uzbekistan) Akgul Amanmuradova	2	6	6^{3}

==== Fourth qualifier ====
First round
4	(Canada) Aleksandra Wozniak	4	6^{4}
(Germany) Annika Beck	6	7^{7}
(Germany) Dinah Pfizenmaier	4	6^{4}
(Russia) Anastasia Pivovarova	6	7^{7}
(Germany) Tatjana Malek	6	6
(Slovakia) Lenka Juríková	1	2
(France) Alizé Cornet	7	7^{7}
5	(Spain) Carla Suárez Navarro	5	6^{1}

Second round
(Germany) Annika Beck	6	4	6
(Russia) Anastasia Pivovarova	4	6	2
(Germany) Tatjana Malek	2	7	1
(France) Alizé Cornet	6	5	6

Qualifying competition
(Germany) Annika Beck	4	6	6^{1}
(France) Alizé Cornet	6	4	7^{7}
