= 2012 Brisbane International – Men's singles =

Coordinates: 27°31′30″S 153°0′26″E

Men's singles
- 2012 Brisbane International

Final
- Champion: (United Kingdom) Andy Murray
- Runner-up: (Ukraine) Alexandr Dolgopolov
- Score: 6–1, 6–3

Details
- Draw: 32 (4 Q / 3 WC )
- Seeds: 8

Events
Singles	men	women
Doubles	men	women
- Brisbane International

Robin Söderling was the defending champion, but decided not to participate this year. Andy Murray, who made his debut appearance at the tournament, beat Alexandr Dolgopolov 6–1, 6–3 to take the title.

== Seeds ==
1. (United Kingdom) Andy Murray (champion)
2. (France) Gilles Simon (semifinals)
3. (Ukraine) Alexandr Dolgopolov (final)
4. (Germany) Florian Mayer (first round, retired due to a right groin injury)
5. (Japan) Kei Nishikori (second round)
6. (Czech Republic) Radek Štěpánek (quarterfinals)
7. (Austria) Jürgen Melzer (first round)
8. (Australia) Bernard Tomic (semifinals)

== Draw ==
Key

- Q = Qualifier
- WC = Wild card
- LL = Lucky loser
- Alt = Alternate
- ITF = ITF entry
- PR = Protected ranking
- SR = Special ranking
- SE = Special exempt
- JE = Junior exempt
- JR = Junior Accelerator Programme entrant
- CO = College Accelerator Programme entrant
- NG = Next Gen Accelerator Program entrant
- w/o = Walkover
- r = Retired
- d = Defaulted

=== Finals ===
Semifinals
1	(United Kingdom) Andy Murray	6	6
8	(Australia) Bernard Tomic	3	2
3	(Ukraine) Alexandr Dolgopolov	6	6
2	(France) Gilles Simon	3	4

Final
1	(United Kingdom) Andy Murray	6	6
3	(Ukraine) Alexandr Dolgopolov	1	3

=== Top half ===
First round
1	(United Kingdom) A Murray	5	6	6
(Kazakhstan) M Kukushkin	7	3	2
(Brazil) R Mello	7^{7}	6^{4}	3
(Luxembourg) G Müller	6^{3}	7^{7}	6
(United States) R Harrison	6^{7}	4
(Cyprus) M Baghdatis	7^{9}	6
(Germany) C-M Stebe	6	1	4
5	(Japan) K Nishikori	3	6	6
4	(Germany) F Mayer	6^{5}	3^{r}
(Uzbekistan) D Istomin	7^{7}	2
PR	(Germany) T Haas	6	7
WC	(Australia) M Matosevic	3	5
Q	(Japan) T Ito	6	6
WC	(Australia) B Mitchell	4	2
(France) J Benneteau	2	6	5
8	(Australia) B Tomic	6	4	7

Second round
1	(United Kingdom) A Murray	4	7^{7}	6
(Luxembourg) G Müller	6	6^{4}	0
(Cyprus) M Baghdatis	6	6
5	(Japan) K Nishikori	3	4
(Uzbekistan) D Istomin	w/o
PR	(Germany) T Haas
Q	(Japan) T Ito	1	2
8	(Australia) B Tomic	6	6

Quarterfinals
1	(United Kingdom) A Murray	6	6
(Cyprus) M Baghdatis	2	2
(Uzbekistan) D Istomin	3	6^{4}
8	(Australia) B Tomic	6	7^{7}

Semifinals
1	(United Kingdom) A Murray	6	6
8	(Australia) B Tomic	3	2

=== Bottom half ===
First round
6	(Czech Republic) R Štěpánek	6	3	6
(Australia) M Ebden	4	6	3
(Finland) J Nieminen	7^{7}	6
Q	(United States) J Levine	6^{4}	2
(France) A Mannarino	6^{6}	2
Q	(Russia) I Andreev	7^{8}	6
(Colombia) A Falla	6^{3}	2
3	(Ukraine) A Dolgopolov	7^{7}	6
7	(Austria) J Melzer	1	5
(Germany) P Petzschner	6	7
(Colombia) S Giraldo	6	6
Q	(Australia) J Millman	3	3
WC	(Australia) J Duckworth	6	6
(France) N Mahut	4	4
(United States) R Sweeting	3	4
2	(France) G Simon	6	6

Second round
6	(Czech Republic) R Štěpánek	7^{7}	6
(Finland) J Nieminen	6^{3}	2
Q	(Russia) I Andreev	7^{7}	6^{9}	2
3	(Ukraine) A Dolgopolov	6^{3}	7^{11}	6
(Germany) P Petzschner	4	4
(Colombia) S Giraldo	6	6
WC	(Australia) J Duckworth	3	5
2	(France) G Simon	6	7

Quarterfinals
6	(Czech Republic) R Štěpánek	6	3	3
3	(Ukraine) A Dolgopolov	4	6	6
(Colombia) S Giraldo	6^{2}	4
2	(France) G Simon	7^{7}	6

Semifinals
3	(Ukraine) A Dolgopolov	6	6
2	(France) G Simon	3	4

== Qualifying ==
=== Seeds ===
1. (Germany) Tobias Kamke (qualifying competition)
2. (Russia) Igor Andreev (qualified)
3. (Japan) Tatsuma Ito (qualified)
4. (Lithuania) Ričardas Berankis (first round)
5. (United States) Bobby Reynolds (first round)
6. (Estonia) Jürgen Zopp (qualifying competition)
7. (Germany) Simon Greul (first round)
8. (United States) Jesse Levine (qualified)

=== Qualifiers ===
1. (United States) Jesse Levine
2. (Russia) Igor Andreev
3. (Japan) Tatsuma Ito
4. (Australia) John Millman

=== Draw ===
==== First qualifier ====
First round
1	(Germany) Tobias Kamke	6	7^{7}
(Australia) Scott Puodziunas	1	6^{3}
(Australia) Greg Jones	7^{7}	7^{7}
(Australia) Samuel Groth	6^{2}	6^{3}
(Colombia) Alejandro González	6	2	5
(Australia) Maverick Banes	3	6	7
(Serbia) Nikola Ćirić	7	3	4
8	(United States) Jesse Levine	5	6	6

Second round
1	(Germany) Tobias Kamke	6	6
(Australia) Greg Jones	3	3
(Australia) Maverick Banes	2	3
8	(United States) Jesse Levine	6	6

Qualifying competition
1	(Germany) Tobias Kamke	5	4
8	(United States) Jesse Levine	7	6

==== Second qualifier ====
First round
2	(Russia) Igor Andreev	6	5	7^{7}
(Bosnia and Herzegovina) Amer Delić	4	7	6^{5}
(Australia) Matt Reid	7	6
(Australia) Isaac Frost	5	2
(France) Émilien Firmin	6^{5}	5
(Australia) Gavin van Peperzeel	7^{7}	7
(Ukraine) Denys Molchanov	5	4^{r}
6	(Estonia) Jürgen Zopp	7	1

Second round
2	(Russia) Igor Andreev	6^{12}	6	6
(Australia) Matt Reid	7^{14}	3	4
(Australia) Gavin van Peperzeel	6	1	3
6	(Estonia) Jürgen Zopp	4	6	6

Qualifying competition
2	(Russia) Igor Andreev	6	2	7
6	(Estonia) Jürgen Zopp	4	6	5

==== Third qualifier ====
First round
3	(Japan) Tatsuma Ito	6	6
(Chinese Taipei) Chen Ti	2	2
(Australia) Luke Saville	6	1	6
(Australia) Alex Bolt	4	6	3
(Australia) John-Patrick Smith	6	6^{5}	6^{3}
(Australia) Michael Look	3	7^{7}	7^{7}
(Australia) Colin Ebelthite	6	6
7	(Germany) Simon Greul	1	2

Second round
3	(Japan) Tatsuma Ito	6	6
(Australia) Luke Saville	2	2
(Australia) Michael Look	6	6
(Australia) Colin Ebelthite	3	4

Qualifying competition
3	(Japan) Tatsuma Ito	4	6	6
(Australia) Michael Look	6	4	4

==== Fourth qualifier ====
First round
4	(Lithuania) Ričardas Berankis	1	4
(Czech Republic) Jan Hernych	6	6
(Australia) Chris Guccione	6	6^{5}	6
(Czech Republic) Lukáš Dlouhý	4	7^{7}	2
(Lithuania) Laurynas Grigelis	7^{7}	6
(Australia) Paul Hanley	6^{4}	2
(Australia) John Millman	4	6	6
5	(United States) Bobby Reynolds	6	1	4

Second round
(Czech Republic) Jan Hernych	3	6^{4}
(Australia) Chris Guccione	6	7^{7}
(Lithuania) Laurynas Grigelis	6	2	2
(Australia) John Millman	4	6	6

Qualifying competition
(Australia) Chris Guccione	6^{4}	7^{7}	6^{4}
(Australia) John Millman	7^{7}	6^{3}	7^{7}
