= 2012 Porsche Tennis Grand Prix =

- Date: 23–29 April
- Edition: 35th
- Category: Premier tournaments
- Surface: Clay / indoor
- Location: Stuttgart, Germany

Champions

Singles
- (Russia) Maria Sharapova

Doubles
- (Czech Republic) Iveta Benešová / (Czech Republic) Barbora Záhlavová-Strýcová
← 2011 ·	Porsche Tennis Grand Prix	· 2013 →

The 2012 Porsche Tennis Grand Prix was a women's tennis tournament played on indoor clay courts. It was the 35th edition of the Porsche Tennis Grand Prix, and was part of the Premier tournaments of the 2012 WTA Tour. It took place at the Porsche Arena in Stuttgart, Germany, from 23 April until 29 April 2012. Second-seeded Maria Sharapova won the singles title.

== Finals ==
=== Singles ===
(Russia) Maria Sharapova defeated. (Belarus) Victoria Azarenka, 6–1, 6–4

- It was Sharapova's 1st title of the year and 25th of her career.

=== Doubles ===
(Czech Republic) Iveta Benešová / (Czech Republic) Barbora Záhlavová-Strýcová defeated. (Germany) Julia Görges / (Germany) Anna-Lena Grönefeld, 6–4, 7–5

== Singles main draw entrants ==
=== Seeds ===
Country	Player	Rank^{1}	Seed
BLR	Victoria Azarenka	1	1
RUS	Maria Sharapova	2	2
CZE	Petra Kvitová	3	3
POL	Agnieszka Radwańska	4	4
AUS	Samantha Stosur	5	5
DEN	Caroline Wozniacki	6	6
FRA	Marion Bartoli	7	7
CHN	Li Na	8	8

- ^{1} Rankings are as of April 16, 2012

=== Other entrants ===
The following players received wildcards into the main draw:

- (Germany) Kristina Barrois
- (Germany) Mona Barthel

The following players received entry from the qualifying draw:

- (Hungary) Gréta Arn
- (Czech Republic) Iveta Benešová
- (Russia) Anna Chakvetadze
- (France) Alizé Cornet

The following players received entry as lucky loser:

- (Uzbekistan) Akgul Amanmuradova
- (Ukraine) Kateryna Bondarenko

=== Withdrawals ===
- (Slovakia) Daniela Hantuchová
- (Germany) Sabine Lisicki
- (Italy) Flavia Pennetta (wrist injury)
- (Russia) Vera Zvonareva

=== Retirements ===
- (France) Alizé Cornet (right shoulder injury)
- (Serbia) Jelena Janković (low back injury)
- (Germany) Andrea Petkovic (right ankle injury)

== Doubles main draw entrants ==
=== Seeds ===
Country	Player	Country	Player	Rank^{1}	Seed
CZE	Květa Peschke	SLO	Katarina Srebotnik	7	1
~~IND~~	~~Sania Mirza~~	~~ITA~~	~~Flavia Pennetta~~	~~24~~	~~2~~
CHN	Peng Shuai	RUS	Elena Vesnina	45	3
RSA	Natalie Grandin	CZE	Vladimíra Uhlířová	45	4
CZE	Iveta Benešová	CZE	Barbora Záhlavová-Strýcová	52	5

- ^{1} Rankings are as of April 16, 2012

=== Other entrants ===
The following pairs received wildcards into the doubles main draw:

- (Germany) Mona Barthel / (Germany) Tatjana Malek
- (Germany) Angelique Kerber / (Germany) Andrea Petkovic
- (Italy) Francesca Schiavone / (Italy) Roberta Vinci

The following pair received entry as alternates:

- (Chinese Taipei) Chan Hao-ching / (Japan) Rika Fujiwara

=== Withdrawals ===
- (Italy) Flavia Pennetta (wrist injury)

=== Retirements ===
- (Argentina) Paola Suárez (low back injury)
