= 2012 Brisbane International =

Coordinates: 27°31′30″S 153°0′26″E

- Date: 1–8 January
- Edition: 4th
- Surface: Hard / outdoors
- Location: Brisbane, Australia
- Venue: Queensland Tennis Centre

Champions

Men's singles
- (United Kingdom) Andy Murray

Women's singles
- (Estonia) Kaia Kanepi

Men's doubles
- (Belarus) Max Mirnyi / (Canada) Daniel Nestor

Women's doubles
- (Spain) Nuria Llagostera Vives / (Spain) Arantxa Parra Santonja
- Brisbane International

The 2012 Brisbane International was a joint 2012 ATP World Tour and 2012 WTA Tour tennis tournament, played on outdoor hard courts in Brisbane, Queensland. Because of its ongoing success, the WTA decided in 2011 to upgrade the event to a Premier event. It was the 4th edition of the tournament and took place at the Queensland Tennis Centre in Tennyson. It was held from 1 to 8 January 2012 and was part of the Australian Open Series in preparation for the first Grand Slam of the year. Andy Murray and Kaia Kanepi won the singles titles.

== Finals ==
=== Men's singles ===
(United Kingdom) Andy Murray defeated (Ukraine) Alexandr Dolgopolov, 6–1, 6–3

- It was Murray's 1st title of the year and 22nd of his career.

=== Women's singles ===
(Estonia) Kaia Kanepi defeated (Slovakia) Daniela Hantuchová, 6–2, 6–1

- It was Kanepi's 1st title of the year and the 2nd of her career.

=== Men's doubles ===
(Belarus) Max Mirnyi / (Canada) Daniel Nestor defeated (Austria) Jürgen Melzer / (Germany) Philipp Petzschner, 6–1, 6–2

=== Women's doubles ===
(Spain) Nuria Llagostera Vives / (Spain) Arantxa Parra Santonja defeated (United States) Raquel Kops-Jones / (United States) Abigail Spears, 7–6^{(7–2)}, 7–6^{(7–2)}

== ATP singles main-draw entrants ==
=== Seeds ===
Country	Player	Rank	Seed
GBR	Andy Murray	4	1
FRA	Gilles Simon	12	2
UKR	Alexandr Dolgopolov	15	3
GER	Florian Mayer	23	4
JPN	Kei Nishikori	25	5
CZE	Radek Štěpánek	28	6
AUT	Jürgen Melzer	33	7
AUS	Bernard Tomic	42	8

- ^{1} Rankings as of 26 December 2011

=== Other entrants ===
The following players received wildcards into the singles main draw:

- (Australia) James Duckworth
- (Australia) Marinko Matosevic
- (Australia) Ben Mitchell

The following players received entry from the qualifying draw:

- (United States) Jesse Levine
- (Russia) Igor Andreev
- (Japan) Tatsuma Ito
- (Australia) John Millman

=== Withdrawals ===
- (South Africa) Kevin Anderson (knee injury)
- (United States) James Blake (personal reasons)
- (Germany) Tommy Haas (calf injury)
- (United States) Donald Young (personal reasons)

=== Retirements ===
- (Germany) Florian Mayer (groin injury)

== ATP doubles main-draw entrants ==
=== Seeds ===
Country	Player	Country	Player	Rank^{1}	Seed
BLR	Max Mirnyi	CAN	Daniel Nestor	4	1
AUT	Jürgen Melzer	GER	Philipp Petzschner	12	2
SWE	Robert Lindstedt	ROU	Horia Tecău	14	3
PAK	Aisam-ul-Haq Qureshi	CUR	Jean-Julien Rojer	16	4

- ^{1} Rankings are as of 26 December 2011

=== Other entrants ===
The following pairs received wildcards into the doubles main draw:

- (Australia) Matthew Ebden / (Australia) Chris Guccione
- (Australia) Greg Jones / (Australia) Marinko Matosevic

=== Withdrawals ===
- (Germany) Tommy Haas (calf injury)

== WTA singles main-draw entrants ==
=== Seeds ===
Country	Player	Rank	Seed
AUS	Samantha Stosur	6	1
GER	Andrea Petkovic	10	2
ITA	Francesca Schiavone	11	3
USA	Serena Williams	12	4
BEL	Kim Clijsters	13	5
SRB	Jelena Janković	14	6
RUS	Anastasia Pavlyuchenkova	16	7
SVK	Dominika Cibulková	18	8

- ^{1} Rankings as of 26 December 2011

=== Other entrants ===
The following players received wildcards into the singles main draw:

- (Australia) Casey Dellacqua
- (Australia) Olivia Rogowska

The following players received entry from the qualifying draw:

- (United States) Vania King
- (Russia) Nina Bratchikova
- (Russia) Vera Dushevina
- (Russia) Alexandra Panova

=== Withdrawals ===
- (Russia) Maria Sharapova (ankle injury)

=== Retirements ===
- (Belgium) Kim Clijsters (left hip injury)
- (Slovenia) Polona Hercog (low back injury)
- (Kazakhstan) Ksenia Pervak (migraine)
- (United States) Serena Williams (left ankle sprain)

== WTA doubles main-draw entrants ==
=== Seeds ===
Country	Player	Country	Player	Rank^{1}	Seed
RSA	Natalie Grandin	CZE	Vladimíra Uhlířová	47	1
CZE	Iveta Benešová	CZE	Barbora Záhlavová-Strýcová	51	2
TPE	Hsieh Su-wei	KAZ	Galina Voskoboeva	66	3
ESP	Nuria Llagostera Vives	ESP	Arantxa Parra Santonja	66	4

- ^{1} Rankings are as of 26 December 2011

=== Other entrants ===
The following pairs received wildcards into the doubles main draw:

- (Australia) Ashleigh Barty / (Australia) Casey Dellacqua
- (Slovakia) Dominika Cibulková / (Slovakia) Janette Husárová
- (Serbia) Jelena Janković / (Germany) Andrea Petkovic

The following pair received entry as alternates:

- (Russia) Nina Bratchikova / (France) Kristina Mladenovic

=== Withdrawals ===
- (Slovenia) Polona Hercog (low back injury)

== Broadcast ==
The 2012 Brisbane International was, for the first time, broadcast live and in full to most states in Australia on digital channel 7Two. In previous years, the event was broadcast only on certain days and often on significant delay on Channel Seven.
