= 2012 Qatar Total Open =

- Date: 13–19 February
- Edition: 10th
- Location: Doha, Qatar
- Venue: Khalifa International Tennis and Squash Complex

Champions

Singles
- (Belarus) Victoria Azarenka

Doubles
- (United States) Liezel Huber / (United States) Lisa Raymond
- Qatar Total Open

The 2012 Qatar Total Open was a professional women's tennis tournament played on hard courts. It was the 10th edition of the event. It took place at International Tennis and Squash complex in Doha, Qatar between 13 and 19 February 2012. It was upgraded from a Premier event to a Premier 5 event. Victoria Azarenka won the singles title.

== Champions ==
=== Singles ===
(Belarus) Victoria Azarenka defeated (Australia) Samantha Stosur, 6–1, 6–2

- It was Azarenka's 3rd title of the year and 11th of her career. It was her 1st Premier 5 title of her career and 6th total Premier title. It was her 3rd consecutive title and 17th consecutive match win.

=== Doubles ===
(United States) Liezel Huber / (United States) Lisa Raymond defeated (United States) Raquel Kops-Jones / (United States) Abigail Spears, 6–3, 6–1

== Singles main-draw entrants ==
=== Seeds ===
Country	Player	Rank^{1}	Seed
BLR	Victoria Azarenka	1	1
DEN	Caroline Wozniacki	4	2
AUS	Samantha Stosur	5	3
POL	Agnieszka Radwańska	6	4
FRA	Marion Bartoli	7	5
RUS	Vera Zvonareva	8	6
ITA	Francesca Schiavone	11	7
SRB	Jelena Janković	13	8
GER	Sabine Lisicki	14	9
RUS	Anastasia Pavlyuchenkova	15	10
SVK	Dominika Cibulková	16	11
CHN	Peng Shuai	17	12
SRB	Ana Ivanovic	18	13
RUS	Svetlana Kuznetsova	19	14
SVK	Daniela Hantuchová	20	15
GER	Julia Görges	21	16

- ^{1} Rankings as of February 6, 2012

=== Other entrants ===
The following players received wildcards into the singles main draw:

- (Oman) Fatma Al-Nabhani
- (Tunisia) Ons Jabeur
- (Morocco) Nadia Lalami

The following players received entry from the qualifying draw:

- (Ukraine) Kateryna Bondarenko
- (Russia) Vera Dushevina
- (France) Caroline Garcia
- (United Kingdom) Anne Keothavong
- (United States) Varvara Lepchenko
- (Poland) Urszula Radwańska
- (France) Virginie Razzano
- (Canada) Aleksandra Wozniak

=== Withdrawals ===
- (Czech Republic) Petra Kvitová
- (Germany) Andrea Petkovic (low back stress fracture)

=== Retirements ===
- (France) Marion Bartoli (right calf injury)
- (Spain) Carla Suárez Navarro (right hip injury)
- (Russia) Vera Zvonareva (left hip injury)

== Doubles main-draw entrants ==
=== Seeds ===
Country	Player	Country	Player	Rank^{1}	Seed
USA	Liezel Huber	USA	Lisa Raymond	3	1
IND	Sania Mirza	RUS	Elena Vesnina	15	2
SVK	Daniela Hantuchová	POL	Agnieszka Radwańska	37	3
RUS	Maria Kirilenko	GER	Sabine Lisicki	55	4
ESP	Nuria Llagostera Vives	AUS	Anastasia Rodionova	57	5
RSA	Natalie Grandin	CZE	Vladimíra Uhlířová	59	6
GER	Julia Görges	CHN	Zheng Jie	64	7
CZE	Iveta Benešová	CZE	Barbora Záhlavová-Strýcová	66	8

- ^{1} Rankings are as of February 6, 2012

=== Other entrants ===
The following pair received wildcard into the doubles main draw:

- (Oman) Fatma Al-Nabhani / (Tunisia) Ons Jabeur

=== Retirements ===
- (Poland) Urszula Radwańska (upper respiratory injury)
