= 2006 ASB Classic =

- Date: 2–7 January
- Edition: 21st
- Category: WTA Tier IV
- Draw: 32S / 16D
- Prize money: $145,000
- Surface: Hard / outdoor
- Location: Auckland, New Zealand
- Venue: ASB Tennis Centre

Champions

Singles
- (France) Marion Bartoli

Doubles
- (Russia) Elena Likhovtseva / (Russia) Vera Zvonareva
← 2005 ·	WTA Auckland Open	· 2007 →

The 2006 Auckland Open (also named ASB Classic for sponsorship reasons) was a 2006 WTA Tour women's tennis tournament, played on outdoor hard courts. It was the 21st edition of the WTA Auckland Open. It took place at the ASB Tennis Centre in Auckland, New Zealand, from 2 January until 7 January 2006. Sixth-seeded Marion Bartoli won the singles title.

== Points and prize money ==
=== Point distribution ===
Event	W	F	SF	QF	Round of 16	Round of 32	Q	Q3	Q2	Q1
Singles	95	67	43	24	12	1	5.5	3.5	2	1
Doubles	95	67	43	24	1	—	6.25	—	—	—

=== Prize money ===
Event	W	F	SF	QF	Round of 16	Round of 32	Q3	Q2	Q1
Singles	$22,900	$12,345	$6,650	$3,580	$1,925	$1,035	$555	$300	$175
Doubles *	$6,750	$3,640	$1,960	$1,050	$565	—	—	—	—

_{* per team}

== Singles main-draw entrants ==
=== Seeds ===
Country	Player	Rank^{1}	Seed
RUS	Nadia Petrova	7	1
SVK	Daniela Hantuchová	17	2
RUS	Elena Likhovtseva	18	3
RUS	Maria Kirilenko	25	4
SLO	Katarina Srebotnik	28	5
FRA	Marion Bartoli	33	6
JPN	Shinobu Asagoe	35	7
RUS	Vera Zvonareva	36	8

- ^{1} Rankings as of 19 December 2005.

=== Other entrants ===
The following players received wildcards into the singles main draw:

- (Belarus) Victoria Azarenka
- (Australia) Jelena Dokic

The following players received entry from the qualifying draw:

- (United States) Ashley Harkleroad
- (Luxembourg) Anne Kremer
- (Israel) Tzipora Obziler
- (United States) Shenay Perry

=== Retirements ===
- (Russia) Nadia Petrova (left groin strain)

== Doubles main-draw entrants ==
=== Seeds ===
Country	Player	Country	Player	Rank^{1}	Seed
RUS	Elena Likhovtseva	RUS	Vera Zvonareva	19	1
RUS	Maria Kirilenko	ARG	Paola Suárez	46	2
JPN	Shinobu Asagoe	SLO	Katarina Srebotnik	49	3
FRA	Émilie Loit	CZE	Barbora Strýcová	71	4

- ^{1} Rankings as of 19 December 2005.

=== Other entrants ===
The following pair received wildcards into the doubles main draw:

- (New Zealand) Leanne Baker / (Italy) Francesca Lubiani

The following pair received entry from the qualifying draw:

- (Germany) Julia Schruff / (Hungary) Ágnes Szávay

=== Withdrawals ===
During the tournament

- (Germany) Julia Schruff / (Hungary) Ágnes Szávay (right thigh strain on Schruff)

== Finals ==
=== Singles ===
- (France) Marion Bartoli defeated (Russia) Vera Zvonareva 6–2, 6–2

It was the 1st title for Bartoli in her career.

=== Doubles ===
- (Russia) Elena Likhovtseva / (Russia) Vera Zvonareva defeated (France) Émilie Loit / (Czech Republic) Barbora Strýcová 6–3, 6–4

It was the 25th title for Likhovtseva and the 3rd title for Zvonareva in their respective doubles careers.

== See also ==
- 2006 Heineken Open – men's tournament
