= 2004 ASB Classic – Singles =

Singles
- 2004 ASB Classic

Final
- Champion: (Greece) Eleni Daniilidou
- Runner-up: (United States) Ashley Harkleroad
- Score: 6–3, 6–2

Details
- Draw: 32
- Seeds: 8

Events
Singles	Doubles
← 2003 ·	WTA Auckland Open	· 2005 →

Eleni Daniilidou was the reigning champion and successfully defended her title, by defeating Ashley Harkleroad 6–3, 6–2 in the final.

== Seeds ==
1. (Argentina) Paola Suárez (semifinals)
2. (Israel) Anna Smashnova-Pistolesi (second round)
3. (Greece) Eleni Daniilidou (champion)
4. (Venezuela) María Vento-Kabchi (first round)
5. (Japan) Shinobu Asagoe (first round)
6. (United States) Laura Granville (first round)
7. (Germany) Marlene Weingärtner (second round)
8. (Germany) Anca Barna (quarterfinals)

== Draw ==
=== Key ===
- Q = Qualifier
- WC = Wild card
- LL = Lucky loser
- Alt = Alternate
- ITF = ITF entry
- PR = Protected ranking
- SR = Special ranking
- SE = Special exempt
- JE = Junior exempt
- JR = Junior Accelerator Programme entrant
- CO = College Accelerator Programme entrant
- NG = Next Gen Accelerator Program entrant
- w/o = Walkover
- r = Retired
- d = Defaulted

=== Finals ===
Semifinals
1	(Argentina) Paola Suárez	6^{13}	4
3	(Greece) Eleni Daniilidou	7^{15}	6
(France) Marion Bartoli	6	4	1
(United States) Ashley Harkleroad	3	6	6

Final
3	(Greece) Eleni Daniilidou	6	6
(United States) Ashley Harkleroad	3	2

=== Top half ===
First round
1	(Argentina) P Suárez	6	6
Q	(United States) T Snyder	4	3
(United States) L Lee-Waters	6	6^{3}	6
(Italy) R Grande	4	7^{7}	4
(United States) A Frazier	3	6	6
(Switzerland) MG Mikaelian	6	2	0
(Puerto Rico) K Brandi	6	6
5	(Japan) S Asagoe	3	4
3	(Greece) E Daniilidou	6	7^{7}
(Croatia) J Kostanić	2	6^{2}
(Czech Republic) K Koukalová	4	2
(Switzerland) E Gagliardi	6	6
Q	(United States) M Tu	6	6
(Japan) A Morigami	3	4
(Spain) A Parra Santonja	2	5
7	(Germany) M Weingärtner	6	7

Second round
1	(Argentina) P Suárez	6	6
(United States) L Lee-Waters	1	3
(United States) A Frazier	6	6^{3}	6^{6}
(Puerto Rico) K Brandi	2	7^{7}	7^{8}
3	(Greece) E Daniilidou	7^{7}	6
(Switzerland) E Gagliardi	6^{3}	2
Q	(United States) M Tu	4	6	7^{7}
7	(Germany) M Weingärtner	6	3	6^{4}

Quarterfinals
1	(Argentina) P Suárez	6	6
(Puerto Rico) K Brandi	4	2
3	(Greece) E Daniilidou	7	6
Q	(United States) M Tu	5	2

Semifinals
1	(Argentina) P Suárez	6^{13}	4
3	(Greece) E Daniilidou	7^{15}	6

=== Bottom half ===
First round
6	(United States) L Granville	6^{2}	1
Q	(Italy) T Garbin	7^{7}	6
Q	(United States) S Perry	6	6
(Spain) V Ruano Pascual	4	3
(France) M Bartoli	6	6
(Spain) A Medina Garrigues	2	0
(Zimbabwe) C Black	6	6
4	(Venezuela) M Vento-Kabchi	2	2
8	(Germany) A Barna	6	6
(Slovakia) Ľ Cervanová	4	1
WC	(New Zealand) S Stephens	4	3
WC	(New Zealand) E Marama	6	6
(United States) T Ashley	2	4
(United States) A Harkleroad	6	6
(Ukraine) J Vakulenko	6	4	3
2	(Israel) A Smashnova-Pistolesi	1	6	6

Second round
Q	(Italy) T Garbin	1	6	3
Q	(United States) S Perry	6	2	6
(France) M Bartoli	6	6
(Zimbabwe) C Black	1	1
8	(Germany) A Barna	6	7
WC	(New Zealand) E Marama	4	5
(United States) A Harkleroad	7^{9}	6
2	(Israel) A Smashnova-Pistolesi	6^{7}	2

Quarterfinals
Q	(United States) S Perry	2	3
(France) M Bartoli	6	6
8	(Germany) A Barna	5	3
(United States) A Harkleroad	7	6

Semifinals
(France) M Bartoli	6	4	1
(United States) A Harkleroad	3	6	6

== Qualifying ==
=== Seeds ===
1. (Hungary) Melinda Czink (second round)
2. (Luxembourg) Claudine Schaul (first round)
3. (Italy) Tathiana Garbin (qualified)
4. (Slovakia) Ľubomíra Kurhajcová (first round)
5. (Slovakia) Martina Suchá (qualifying competition)
6. (Argentina) Clarisa Fernández (first round)
7. (Russia) Alina Jidkova (second round)
8. (United States) Jill Craybas (qualifying competition)

=== Qualifiers ===
1. (United States) Shenay Perry
2. (United States) Tara Snyder
3. (Italy) Tathiana Garbin
4. (United States) Meilen Tu

=== Qualifying draw ===
==== First qualifier ====
First round
1	(Hungary) Melinda Czink	6	6
(United States) Ansley Cargill	4	4
(Japan) Seiko Okamoto	7	6
(Australia) Evie Dominikovic	5	4
WC	(New Zealand) Leanne Baker	1	1
(United States) Shenay Perry	6	6
(Croatia) Ivana Abramović	6	7
6	(Argentina) Clarisa Fernández	1	5

Second round
1	(Hungary) Melinda Czink	6^{4}	1
(Japan) Seiko Okamoto	7^{7}	6
(United States) Shenay Perry	6	7^{8}
(Croatia) Ivana Abramović	4	6^{6}

Qualifying competition
(Japan) Seiko Okamoto	2	2
(United States) Shenay Perry	6	6

==== Second qualifier ====
First round
2	(Luxembourg) Claudine Schaul	3	5
(Israel) Tzipora Obziler	6	7
(United States) Tara Snyder	6	6
(Colombia) Catalina Castaño	2	2
(Japan) Yuka Yoshida	3	1
(Argentina) Gisela Dulko	6	6
(Germany) Anna-Lena Grönefeld	1	7^{7}	1
5	(Slovakia) Martina Suchá	6	6^{5}	6

Second round
(Israel) Tzipora Obziler	6^{6}	5
(United States) Tara Snyder	7^{8}	7
(Argentina) Gisela Dulko	6	1	3
5	(Slovakia) Martina Suchá	3	6	6

Qualifying competition
(United States) Tara Snyder	6	4	7^{7}
5	(Slovakia) Martina Suchá	3	6	6^{4}

==== Third qualifier ====
First round
3	(Italy) Tathiana Garbin	7^{7}	3	6
(Czech Republic) Renata Voráčová	6^{4}	6	2
(Sweden) Sofia Arvidsson	2	7	6
(Bosnia and Herzegovina) Mervana Jugić-Salkić	6	5	2
(Italy) Mara Santangelo	6	6
WC	(New Zealand) Ilke Gers	0	4
(Czech Republic) Iveta Benešová	3	4
7	(Russia) Alina Jidkova	6	6

Second round
3	(Italy) Tathiana Garbin	0	7	6
(Sweden) Sofia Arvidsson	6	5	1
(Italy) Mara Santangelo	7^{7}	6
7	(Russia) Alina Jidkova	6^{5}	1

Qualifying competition
3	(Italy) Tathiana Garbin	6	6
(Italy) Mara Santangelo	4	1

==== Fourth qualifier ====
First round
4	(Slovakia) Ľubomíra Kurhajcová	4	6^{3}
(Russia) Tatiana Panova	6	7^{7}
(Spain) Conchita Martínez Granados	6	1	4
(United States) Meilen Tu	4	6	6
WC	(New Zealand) Dianne Hollands	4	2
WC	(New Zealand) Paula Marama	6	6
Alt	(Russia) Galina Voskoboeva	4	6^{4}
8	(United States) Jill Craybas	6	7^{7}

Second round
(Russia) Tatiana Panova	7	6^{2}	1
(United States) Meilen Tu	5	7^{7}	6
WC	(New Zealand) Paula Marama	2	0
8	(United States) Jill Craybas	6	6

Qualifying competition
(United States) Meilen Tu	4	6	6
8	(United States) Jill Craybas	6	3	4
