= 2013 Open GDF Suez =

- Date: 28 January – 3 February
- Edition: 21st
- Category: WTA Premier
- Draw: 28S / 16D
- Prize money: $690,000
- Surface: Hard
- Location: Paris, France

Champions

Singles
- (Germany) Mona Barthel

Doubles
- (Italy) Sara Errani / (Italy) Roberta Vinci
← 2012 ·	Open GDF Suez	· 2014 →

The 2013 Open GDF Suez was a women's professional tennis tournament played on indoor hard courts. It was the 21st edition of the Open GDF Suez (formerly known as the Open Gaz de France) and a Premier tournament on the 2013 WTA Tour. It took place at Stade Pierre de Coubertin in Paris, France from 26 January through 3 February 2013. Unseeded Mona Barthel won the singles title.

== Finals ==
=== Singles ===
- (Germany) Mona Barthel defeated (Italy) Sara Errani, 7–5, 7–6^{(7–4)}

=== Doubles ===
- (Italy) Sara Errani / (Italy) Roberta Vinci defeated (Czech Republic) Andrea Hlaváčková / (United States) Liezel Huber, 6–1, 6–1

== Points and prize money ==
=== Point distribution ===
Event	W	F	SF	QF	Round of 16	Round of 32	Q	Q3	Q2	Q1
Singles	470	320	200	120	60	1	20	12	8	1
Doubles	470	320	200	120	1	—	—	—	—	—

=== Prize money ===
Event	W	F	SF	QF	Round of 16	Round of 32	Q3	Q2	Q1
Singles	€94,355	€50,242	€26,815	€14,385	€7,726	€4,911	€2,202	€1,169	€653
Doubles *	€29,435	€15,711	€8,589	€4,375	€2,371	—	—	—	—

_{* per team}

== Singles main-draw entrants ==
=== Seeds ===
Country	Player	Ranking^{1}	Seeding
ITA	Sara Errani	7	1
CZE	Petra Kvitová	8	2
FRA	Marion Bartoli	11	3
SVK	Dominika Cibulková	14	4
ITA	Roberta Vinci	16	5
CZE	Lucie Šafářová	17	6
GER	Julia Görges	18	7
CZE	Klára Zakopalová	22	8

- ^{1} Rankings as of January 14, 2013

=== Other entrants ===
The following players received wildcards into the main draw:

- (Czech Republic) Petra Kvitová
- (France) Kristina Mladenovic
- (France) Pauline Parmentier
- (Czech Republic) Lucie Šafářová

The following players received entry from the qualifying draw:

- (Romania) Monica Niculescu
- (France) Virginie Razzano
- (Slovakia) Magdaléna Rybáriková
- (Switzerland) Stefanie Vögele

The following player received entry as lucky loser:

- (Netherlands) Kiki Bertens

=== Withdrawals ===
Before the tournament

- (Czech Republic) Lucie Hradecká (viral illness)
- (Estonia) Kaia Kanepi
- (United States) Venus Williams (back injury)

=== Retirements ===
- (Netherlands) Kiki Bertens (back injury)
- (Slovakia) Magdaléna Rybáriková (viral illness)

== Doubles main-draw entrants ==
=== Seeds ===
Country	Player	Country	Player	Rank^{1}	Seed
ITA	Sara Errani	ITA	Roberta Vinci	2	1
CZE	Andrea Hlaváčková	USA	Liezel Huber	12	2
GER	Julia Görges	ROU	Monica Niculescu	53	3
CZE	Květa Peschke	POL	Alicja Rosolska	62	4

- ^{1} Rankings are as of January 14, 2013

=== Other entrants ===
The following pairs received wildcards into the doubles main draw:

- (France) Julie Coin / (France) Pauline Parmentier
- (Czech Republic) Petra Kvitová / (Belgium) Yanina Wickmayer

=== Retirements ===
During the tournament

- (Czech Republic) Lucie Šafářová (right knee injury)
