= 2005 ASB Classic – Singles =

Singles
- 2005 ASB Classic

Final
- Champion: (Slovenia) Katarina Srebotnik
- Runner-up: (Japan) Shinobu Asagoe
- Score: 5–7, 7–5, 6–4

Details
- Draw: 32
- Seeds: 8

Events
Singles	Doubles
← 2004 ·	WTA Auckland Open	· 2006 →

Eleni Daniilidou was the two-time defending champion, but was defeated in the first round by Mara Santangelo.

Katarina Srebotnik won the title, defeating Shinobu Asagoe in the final.

== Seeds ==
1. (United States) Amy Frazier (semifinals)
2. (Serbia and Montenegro) Jelena Janković (quarterfinals)
3. (Greece) Eleni Daniilidou (first round)
4. (Japan) Shinobu Asagoe (final)
5. (France) Marion Bartoli (semifinals)
6. (Puerto Rico) Kristina Brandi (first round)
7. (Venezuela) María Vento-Kabchi (first round)
8. (Russia) Alina Jidkova (first round)

== Draw ==
Key

- Q = Qualifier
- WC = Wild card
- LL = Lucky loser
- Alt = Alternate
- ITF = ITF entry
- PR = Protected ranking
- SR = Special ranking
- SE = Special exempt
- JE = Junior exempt
- JR = Junior Accelerator Programme entrant
- CO = College Accelerator Programme entrant
- NG = Next Gen Accelerator Program entrant
- w/o = Walkover
- r = Retired
- d = Defaulted

=== Finals ===
Semifinals
1	(United States) Amy Frazier	6^{4}	4
4	(Japan) Shinobu Asagoe	7	6
(Slovenia) Katarina Srebotnik	7	2	7
5	(France) Marion Bartoli	5	6	5

Final
4	(Japan) Shinobu Asagoe	7	5	4
(Slovenia) Katarina Srebotnik	5	7	6

=== Top half ===
First round
1	(United States) A Frazier	6	6
(United States) L Granville	3	3
(Czech Republic) L Šafářová	6	6
Q	(Japan) Y Yoshida	0	1
(Russia) T Panova	6	7
(United States) L Lee-Waters	3	5
(Slovakia) M Suchá	6	6
7	(Venezuela) M Vento-Kabchi	4	4
4	(Japan) S Asagoe	6	6
(Ukraine) T Perebiynis	4	1
(Poland) M Domachowska	5	6	3
(United States) S Perry	7	3	6
WC	(New Zealand) M Erakovic	4	7	6
Q	(Canada) M-È Pelletier	6	5	3
Q	(Slovakia) J Husárová	6	6
6	(Puerto Rico) K Brandi	1	2

Second round
1	(United States) A Frazier	6	6
(Czech Republic) L Šafářová	3	1
(Russia) T Panova	7	4	6
(Slovakia) M Suchá	6^{2}	6	3
4	(Japan) S Asagoe	6
(United States) S Perry	1	r
WC	(New Zealand) M Erakovic	4	0
Q	(Slovakia) J Husárová	6	6

Quarterfinals
1	(United States) A Frazier	7	3	6
(Russia) T Panova	6^{4}	6	2
4	(Japan) S Asagoe	5
Q	(Slovakia) J Husárová	2	r

Semifinals
1	(United States) A Frazier	6^{4}	4
4	(Japan) S Asagoe	7	6

=== Bottom half ===
First round
8	(Russia) A Jidkova	3	6	3
(Slovenia) K Srebotnik	6	4	6
WC	(Russia) L Krasnoroutskaia	7	6
(Hungary) A Kapros	6^{5}	1
(Japan) A Morigami	3	6	3
Q	(Israel) S Pe'er	6	4	6
(Italy) M Santangelo	6	1	6
3	(Greece) E Daniilidou	2	6	1
5	(France) M Bartoli	6	6
(United States) A Spears	0	1
(United States) J Craybas	6	6
LL	(United States) M Tu	2	2
(Luxembourg) A Kremer	3	3
(Spain) N Llagostera Vives	6	6
(Luxembourg) C Schaul	5	2
2	(Serbia and Montenegro) J Janković	7	6

Second round
(Slovenia) K Srebotnik	7	6
WC	(Russia) L Krasnoroutskaia	6^{5}	1
Q	(Israel) S Pe'er	6	4	6
(Italy) M Santangelo	3	6	2
5	(France) M Bartoli	2	6	6
(United States) J Craybas	6	0	1
(Spain) N Llagostera Vives	1	0
2	(Serbia and Montenegro) J Janković	6	6

Quarterfinals
(Slovenia) K Srebotnik	6	6
Q	(Israel) S Pe'er	1	4
5	(France) M Bartoli	3	7	6
2	(Serbia and Montenegro) J Janković	6	6^{6}	1

Semifinals
(Slovenia) K Srebotnik	7	2	7
5	(France) M Bartoli	5	6	5
