= 2012 Open GDF Suez – Singles =

Singles
- 2012 Open GDF Suez

Final
- Champion: (Germany) Angelique Kerber
- Runner-up: (France) Marion Bartoli
- Score: 7–6^{(7–3)}, 5–7, 6–3

Details
- Draw: 30
- Seeds: 8

Events
Singles	Doubles
← 2011 ·	Open GDF Suez	· 2013 →

Petra Kvitová was the defending champion, but she chose not to participate this year.

Angelique Kerber won her maiden WTA singles title, defeating Marion Bartoli in the final 7–6^{(7–3)}, 5–7, 6–3.

== Seeds ==
1. (Russia) Maria Sharapova (quarterfinals)
2. (France) Marion Bartoli (final)
3. (China) Li Na (first round, retired due to sore back)
4. (Serbia) Jelena Janković (withdrew due to a left thigh injury)
5. (Germany) Sabine Lisicki (withdrew due to a viral illness)
6. (Germany) Julia Görges (quarterfinals)
7. (Italy) Roberta Vinci (quarterfinals)
8. (Spain) Anabel Medina Garrigues (first round)
9. (Germany) Angelique Kerber (champion)

== Draw ==
=== Key ===
- Q = Qualifier
- WC = Wild card
- LL = Lucky loser
- Alt = Alternate
- SE = Special exempt
- PR = Protected ranking
- ITF = ITF entry
- JE = Junior exempt
- w/o = Walkover
- r = Retired
- d = Defaulted
- SR = Special ranking

=== Finals ===
Semifinals
9	(Germany) Angelique Kerber	6^{2}	6	6
(Belgium) Yanina Wickmayer	7^{7}	3	4
(Czech Republic) Klára Zakopalová	6^{3}	0
2	(France) Marion Bartoli	7^{7}	6

Final
9	(Germany) Angelique Kerber	7^{7}	5	6
2	(France) Marion Bartoli	6^{3}	7	3

=== Top half ===
First round
(Slovenia) P Hercog	2	2
(South Africa) C Scheepers	6	6
(Australia) J Gajdošová	1	6	4
(Romania) M Niculescu	6	4	6
(Czech Republic) L Šafářová	2	6^{3}
9	(Germany) A Kerber	6	7^{7}
LL	(United States) J Craybas	1	0^{r}
(Belgium) Y Wickmayer	6	0
LL	(United States) V Lepchenko	4	5
(United States) C McHale	6	7
(Czech Republic) B Záhlavová-Strýcová	3	2
Q	(Germany) M Barthel	6	6
WC	(France) P Parmentier	2	6	6
8	(Spain) A Medina Garrigues	6	3	3

Second round
1	(Russia) M Sharapova	6	6
(South Africa) C Scheepers	3	1
(Romania) M Niculescu	3	6	3
9	(Germany) A Kerber	6	4	6
(Belgium) Y Wickmayer	6	7
(United States) C McHale	2	5
Q	(Germany) M Barthel	6	6
WC	(France) P Parmentier	3	0

Quarterfinals
1	(Russia) M Sharapova	4	4
9	(Germany) A Kerber	6	6
(Belgium) Y Wickmayer	6	6^{3}	6
Q	(Germany) M Barthel	4	7^{7}	3

Semifinals
9	(Germany) A Kerber	6^{2}	6	6
(Belgium) Y Wickmayer	7^{7}	3	4

=== Bottom half ===
First round
6	(Germany) J Görges	6	6
(Israel) S Pe'er	1	3
LL	(Italy) A Brianti	3	3
(Czech Republic) P Cetkovská	6	6
(Czech Republic) K Zakopalová	6	6
WC	(France) A Cornet	3	1
(Bulgaria) T Pironkova	7^{7}	3
3	(China) N Li	6^{5}	2^{r}
7	(Italy) R Vinci	6	6
(Romania) S Halep	4	4
Q	(Germany) K Barrois	6^{3}	2
Q	(United States) B Mattek-Sands	7^{7}	6
(Croatia) P Martić	6	6
Q	(Hungary) G Arn	4	4

Second round
6	(Germany) J Görges	6	6
(Czech Republic) P Cetkovská	1	4
(Czech Republic) K Zakopalová	6	6
(Bulgaria) T Pironkova	0	3
7	(Italy) R Vinci	6	1	6
Q	(United States) B Mattek-Sands	3	6	3
(Croatia) P Martić	5	1
2	(France) M Bartoli	7	6

Quarterfinals
6	(Germany) J Görges	6	5	1
(Czech Republic) K Zakopalová	3	7	6
7	(Italy) R Vinci	6	4	6^{2}
2	(France) M Bartoli	4	6	7^{7}

Semifinals
(Czech Republic) K Zakopalová	6^{3}	0
2	(France) M Bartoli	7^{7}	6

== Qualifying ==
=== Seeds ===
1. (Germany) Mona Barthel (qualified)
2. (United States) Bethanie Mattek-Sands (qualified)
3. (Italy) Alberta Brianti (qualifying competition, lucky loser)
4. (Hungary) Gréta Arn (qualified)
5. (Russia) Nina Bratchikova (second round)
6. (Germany) Kristina Barrois (qualified)
7. (United States) Varvara Lepchenko (qualifying competition, lucky loser)
8. (France) Aravane Rezaï (withdrew)
9. (United States) Jill Craybas (qualifying competition, lucky loser)

=== Qualifiers ===
1. (Germany) Mona Barthel
2. (United States) Bethanie Mattek-Sands
3. (Germany) Kristina Barrois
4. (Hungary) Gréta Arn

=== Lucky losers ===
1. (Italy) Alberta Brianti
2. (United States) Varvara Lepchenko
3. (United States) Jill Craybas

=== Draw ===
==== First qualifier ====
First round
1	(Germany) Mona Barthel	6	6
(Ukraine) Mariya Koryttseva	4	3
(Georgia (country)) Margalita Chakhnashvili	0	0
(France) Julie Coin	6	6
(Poland) Marta Domachowska	6	6
(Romania) Elena Bogdan	4	4
(France) Laura Thorpe	2	5
7	(United States) Varvara Lepchenko	6	7

Second round
1	(Germany) Mona Barthel	6	7
(France) Julie Coin	3	5
(Poland) Marta Domachowska	2	3
7	(United States) Varvara Lepchenko	6	6

Qualifying competition
1	(Germany) Mona Barthel	6	6
7	(United States) Varvara Lepchenko	3	4

==== Second qualifier ====
First round
2	(United States) Bethanie Mattek-Sands	6	7^{7}
(Ukraine) Veronika Kapshay	3	6^{4}
Alt	(France) Audrey Bergot	1	2
(United Kingdom) Naomi Broady	6	6
WC	(France) Irina Ramialison	6	5	2
(Italy) Anna Remondina	4	7	6
(France) Alizé Lim	1	6	2
9	(United States) Jill Craybas	6	4	6

Second round
2	(United States) Bethanie Mattek-Sands	6	3	6
(United Kingdom) Naomi Broady	3	6	1
(Italy) Anna Remondina	6^{5}	2
9	(United States) Jill Craybas	7^{7}	6

Qualifying competition
2	(United States) Bethanie Mattek-Sands	6	6^{3}	6
9	(United States) Jill Craybas	1	7^{7}	4

==== Third qualifier ====
First round
3	(Italy) Alberta Brianti	6	6
(Liechtenstein) Stephanie Vogt	4	0
(Italy) Anna Floris	4	2
(Slovakia) Kristína Kučová	6	6
WC	(France) Amandine Hesse	1	1
(Russia) Ekaterina Bychkova	6	6
(Germany) Tatjana Malek	3	2
6	(Germany) Kristina Barrois	6	6

Second round
3	(Italy) Alberta Brianti	6	7
(Slovakia) Kristína Kučová	3	5
(Russia) Ekaterina Bychkova	0	0
6	(Germany) Kristina Barrois	6	6

Qualifying competition
3	(Italy) Alberta Brianti	0	3
6	(Germany) Kristina Barrois	6	6

==== Fourth qualifier ====
First round
4	(Hungary) Gréta Arn	4	6	7
WC	(France) Myrtille Georges	6	4	5
Alt	(South Africa) Natalie Grandin	6	0	1
(France) Séverine Beltrame	3	6	6
(Italy) Giulia Gatto-Monticone	6^{5}	6	2
(Spain) Garbiñe Muguruza Blanco	7^{7}	3	6
WC	(France) Jessica Ginier	6	1	4
5	(Russia) Nina Bratchikova	4	6	6

Second round
4	(Hungary) Gréta Arn	7^{7}	6
(France) Séverine Beltrame	6^{3}	3
(Spain) Garbiñe Muguruza Blanco	6	6
5	(Russia) Nina Bratchikova	3	3

Qualifying competition
4	(Hungary) Gréta Arn	5	6	6
(Spain) Garbiñe Muguruza Blanco	7	4	1
