= 2004 ASB Classic – Doubles =

Doubles
- 2004 ASB Classic

Final
- Champions: (Bosnia and Herzegovina) Mervana Jugić-Salkić (Croatia) Jelena Kostanić
- Runners-up: (Spain) Virginia Ruano Pascual (Argentina) Paola Suárez
- Score: 7–6^{(8–6)}, 3–6, 6–1

Details
- Draw: 16
- Seeds: 4

Events
Singles	Doubles
← 2003 ·	WTA Auckland Open	· 2005 →

Teryn Ashley and Abigail Spears were the defending champions, but Spears decided to compete in Gold Coast at the same week. Ashley teamed up with Shenay Perry and lost in first round to Iveta Benešová and Renata Voráčová.

Mervana Jugić-Salkić and Jelena Kostanić won the title by defeating Virginia Ruano Pascual and Paola Suárez 7–6^{(8–6)}, 3–6, 6–1 in the final.

== Seeds ==
1. (Spain) Virginia Ruano Pascual / (Argentina) Paola Suárez (final)
2. (United States) Meilen Tu / (Venezuela) María Vento-Kabchi (first round)
3. (France) Marion Bartoli / (United States) Laura Granville (quarterfinals)
4. (Greece) Eleni Daniilidou / (Italy) Rita Grande (semifinals)

== Draw ==
=== Key ===
- Q = Qualifier
- WC = Wild card
- LL = Lucky loser
- Alt = Alternate
- ITF = ITF entry
- PR = Protected ranking
- SR = Special ranking
- SE = Special exempt
- JE = Junior exempt
- JR = Junior Accelerator Programme entrant
- CO = College Accelerator Programme entrant
- NG = Next Gen Accelerator Program entrant
- w/o = Walkover
- r = Retired
- d = Defaulted

=== Draw ===
First round
1	(Spain) V Ruano Pascual (Argentina) P Suárez	6	6
(Switzerland) E Gagliardi (Spain) A Medina Garrigues	3	1
WC	(New Zealand) E Marama (New Zealand) P Marama	3	4
(United States) J Hopkins (Chinese Taipei) J Lee	6	6
4	(Greece) E Daniilidou (Italy) R Grande	6^{2}	6	6
(United States) A Cargill (United States) A Harkleroad	7^{7}	2	4
(United States) T Ashley (United States) S Perry	4	2
(Czech Republic) I Benešová (Czech Republic) R Voráčová	6	6
(United States) J Craybas (Spain) C Martínez Granados	7^{7}	6^{10}	4
(Bosnia and Herzegovina) M Jugić-Salkić (Croatia) J Kostanić	6^{3}	7^{12}	6
(Argentina) ME Salerni (Sweden) Å Svensson	3	4
3	(France) M Bartoli (United States) L Granville	6	6
Q	(Japan) S Asagoe (Japan) Y Yoshida	6^{0}	6^{5}
(Russia) A Jidkova (Japan) A Morigami	7^{7}	7^{7}
(Argentina) G Dulko (Italy) T Garbin	6	7
2	(United States) M Tu (Venezuela) M Vento-Kabchi	3	5

Quarterfinals
1	(Spain) V Ruano Pascual (Argentina) P Suárez	6	6
(United States) J Hopkins (Chinese Taipei) J Lee	2	0
4	(Greece) E Daniilidou (Italy) R Grande	7	1	6
(Czech Republic) I Benešová (Czech Republic) R Voráčová	5	6	4
(Bosnia and Herzegovina) M Jugić-Salkić (Croatia) J Kostanić	6	6
3	(France) M Bartoli (United States) L Granville	1	4
(Russia) A Jidkova (Japan) A Morigami	4	6	6^{5}
(Argentina) G Dulko (Italy) T Garbin	6	3	7^{7}

Semifinals
1	(Spain) V Ruano Pascual (Argentina) P Suárez	6	6
4	(Greece) E Daniilidou (Italy) R Grande	2	0
(Bosnia and Herzegovina) M Jugić-Salkić (Croatia) J Kostanić	7^{8}	7
(Argentina) G Dulko (Italy) T Garbin	6^{6}	5

Final
1	(Spain) V Ruano Pascual (Argentina) P Suárez	6^{6}	6	1
(Bosnia and Herzegovina) M Jugić-Salkić (Croatia) J Kostanić	7^{8}	3	6

== Qualifying ==
=== Seeds ===
1. (Australia) Evie Dominikovic / (South Africa) Kim Grant (first round)
2. (Japan) Shinobu Asagoe / (Japan) Yuka Yoshida (qualified)

=== Qualifiers ===
1. (Japan) Shinobu Asagoe / (Japan) Yuka Yoshida

=== Qualifying draw ===
First round
1	(Australia) Evie Dominikovic (South Africa) Kim Grant	7
(Hungary) Zsófia Gubacsi (Croatia) Darija Jurak	9
WC	(New Zealand) Ilke Gers (Russia) Anastasia Rodionova	6
2	(Japan) Shinobu Asagoe (Japan) Yuka Yoshida	8

Qualifying competition
(Hungary) Zsófia Gubacsi (Croatia) Darija Jurak	7	4	2
2	(Japan) Shinobu Asagoe (Japan) Yuka Yoshida	5	6	6
