= 2013 Open GDF Suez – Singles =

Singles
- 2013 Open GDF Suez

Final
- Champion: (Germany) Mona Barthel
- Runner-up: (Italy) Sara Errani
- Score: 7–5, 7–6^{(7–4)}

Details
- Draw: 28
- Seeds: 8

Events
Singles	Doubles
← 2012 ·	Open GDF Suez	· 2014 →

Angelique Kerber was the defending champion, but she decided not to participate this year.

Mona Barthel won the title, defeating Sara Errani in the final 7–5, 7–6^{(7–4)}.

== Seeds ==
The top four seeds receive a bye into the second round.

1. (Italy) Sara Errani (final)
2. (Czech Republic) Petra Kvitová (quarterfinals)
3. (France) Marion Bartoli (quarterfinals)
4. (Slovakia) Dominika Cibulková (second round)
5. (Italy) Roberta Vinci (second round)
6. (Czech Republic) Lucie Šafářová (quarterfinals)
7. (Germany) Julia Görges (first round)
8. (Czech Republic) Klára Zakopalová (second round)

== Draw ==
=== Key ===
- Q = Qualifier
- WC = Wild card
- LL = Lucky loser
- Alt = Alternate
- SE = Special exempt
- PR = Protected ranking
- ITF = ITF entry
- JE = Junior exempt
- w/o = Walkover
- r = Retired
- d = Defaulted
- SR = Special ranking

=== Finals ===
Semifinals
1	(Italy) Sara Errani	5
LL	(Netherlands) Kiki Bertens	0^{r}
(Germany) Mona Barthel	6	6
WC	(France) Kristina Mladenovic	1	4

Final
1	(Italy) Sara Errani	5	6^{4}
(Germany) Mona Barthel	7	7^{7}

=== Top half ===
First round
Q	(Slovakia) M Rybáriková	6	3	6
Q	(France) V Razzano	4	6	3
Q	(Romania) M Niculescu	3	6^{3}
(Spain) C Suárez Navarro	6	7^{7}
(Spain) A Medina Garrigues	6	5	0
8	(Czech Republic) K Zakopalová	2	7	6
LL	(Netherlands) K Bertens	6	7
(Austria) T Paszek	4	5
(Sweden) S Arvidsson	3	6	0
(France) A Cornet	6	4	6
(Spain) L Domínguez Lino	6	1	1
6/WC	(Czech Republic) L Šafářová	2	6	6

Second round
1	(Italy) S Errani	4
Q	(Slovakia) M Rybáriková	0^{r}
(Spain) C Suárez Navarro	6	6
8	(Czech Republic) K Zakopalová	4	3
4	(Slovakia) D Cibulková	5	4
LL	(Netherlands) K Bertens	7	6
(France) A Cornet	2	6	2
6/WC	(Czech Republic) L Šafářová	6	4	6

Quarterfinals
1	(Italy) S Errani	7	4	7
(Spain) C Suárez Navarro	5	6	5
LL	(Netherlands) K Bertens	6	7
6/WC	(Czech Republic) L Šafářová	1	5

Semifinals
1	(Italy) S Errani	5
LL	(Netherlands) K Bertens	0^{r}

=== Bottom half ===
First round
5	(Italy) R Vinci	6	6
(Romania) S Halep	0	3
(Germany) M Barthel	7^{7}	6
(Poland) U Radwańska	6^{1}	0
(United States) C McHale	6	6
WC	(France) P Parmentier	4	1
7	(Germany) J Görges	5	7	6^{4}
WC	(France) K Mladenovic	7	5	7^{7}
(Belgium) Y Wickmayer	7^{9}	4	6
(Russia) A Pavlyuchenkova	6^{7}	6	3
(Bulgaria) T Pironkova	4	2
Q	(Switzerland) S Vögele	6	6

Second round
5	(Italy) R Vinci	6	1	3
(Germany) M Barthel	4	6	6
(United States) C McHale	5	1
3	(France) M Bartoli	7	6
WC	(France) K Mladenovic	6	6
(Belgium) Y Wickmayer	4	4
Q	(Switzerland) S Vögele	6^{5}	3
2/WC	(Czech Republic) P Kvitová	7^{7}	6

Quarterfinals
(Germany) M Barthel	7^{9}	6
3	(France) M Bartoli	6^{7}	4
WC	(France) K Mladenovic	6	6
2/WC	(Czech Republic) P Kvitová	3	4

Semifinals
(Germany) M Barthel	6	6
WC	(France) K Mladenovic	1	4

== Qualifying ==
=== Seeds ===
1. (Italy) Francesca Schiavone (first round)
2. (Romania) Monica Niculescu (qualified)
3. (Georgia (country)) Anna Tatishvili (first round)
4. (Netherlands) Kiki Bertens (qualifying competition, lucky loser)
5. (Slovakia) Magdaléna Rybáriková (qualified)
6. (Czech Republic) Andrea Hlaváčková (first round)
7. (Spain) Lara Arruabarrena Vecino (second round)
8. (Luxembourg) Mandy Minella (first round)

=== Qualifiers ===
1. (Slovakia) Magdaléna Rybáriková
2. (Romania) Monica Niculescu
3. (Switzerland) Stefanie Vögele
4. (France) Virginie Razzano

=== Lucky losers ===
1. (Netherlands) Kiki Bertens

=== Draw ===
==== First qualifier ====
First round
1/WC	(Italy) Francesca Schiavone	6^{2}	2
(France) Caroline Garcia	7^{7}	6
(Spain) María José Martínez Sánchez	6	0^{r}
(Spain) Estrella Cabeza Candela	2	1
(Spain) Garbiñe Muguruza	7	6
(Italy) Karin Knapp	5	4
WC	(France) Myrtille Georges	3	0
5	(Slovakia) Magdaléna Rybáriková	6	6

Second round
(France) Caroline Garcia	6	7
(Spain) Estrella Cabeza Candela	4	5
(Spain) Garbiñe Muguruza	6	1	3
5	(Slovakia) Magdaléna Rybáriková	3	6	6

Qualifying competition
(France) Caroline Garcia	6^{4}	1
5	(Slovakia) Magdaléna Rybáriková	7^{7}	6

==== Second qualifier ====
First round
2	(Romania) Monica Niculescu	6	6
WC	(France) Alizé Lim	3	2
(Russia) Vera Dushevina	6	6
(Spain) Silvia Soler Espinosa	3	2
WC	(France) Julie Coin	7^{7}	1	3
(Serbia) Vesna Dolonc	6^{5}	6	6
(France) Claire Feuerstein	6	6
6	(Czech Republic) Andrea Hlaváčková	3	4

Second round
2	(Romania) Monica Niculescu	6	6
(Russia) Vera Dushevina	2	3
(Serbia) Vesna Dolonc	6	1	6
(France) Claire Feuerstein	4	6	1

Qualifying competition
2	(Romania) Monica Niculescu	6	6
(Serbia) Vesna Dolonc	3	4

==== Third qualifier ====
First round
3	(Georgia (country)) Anna Tatishvili	6^{4}	5
(Italy) Maria Elena Camerin	7^{7}	7
(Puerto Rico) Monica Puig	6	6
(Canada) Heidi El Tabakh	1	3
(France) Stéphanie Foretz Gacon	6	3	6
(France) Aravane Rezaï	4	6	1
(Switzerland) Stefanie Vögele	6	6
8	(Luxembourg) Mandy Minella	4	3

Second round
(Italy) Maria Elena Camerin	1	2
(Puerto Rico) Monica Puig	6	6
(France) Stéphanie Foretz Gacon	2	0
(Switzerland) Stefanie Vögele	6	6

Qualifying competition
(Puerto Rico) Monica Puig	4	2
(Switzerland) Stefanie Vögele	6	6

==== Fourth qualifier ====
First round
4	(Netherlands) Kiki Bertens	6	6
(Spain) María Teresa Torró Flor	3	1
(Czech Republic) Karolína Plíšková	6	6^{0}	7
(France) Irena Pavlovic	4	7^{7}	5
(France) Virginie Razzano	7	6
(United States) Madison Brengle	5	0
(Czech Republic) Kristýna Plíšková	6	3	3
7	(Spain) Lara Arruabarrena Vecino	3	6	6

Second round
4	(Netherlands) Kiki Bertens	6	7^{7}
(Czech Republic) Karolína Plíšková	4	6^{3}
(France) Virginie Razzano	6	6
7	(Spain) Lara Arruabarrena Vecino	3	0

Qualifying competition
4	(Netherlands) Kiki Bertens	6	2	1
(France) Virginie Razzano	2	6	6
