= 2006 ASB Classic – Singles =

Tennis tournament

Singles
- 2006 ASB Classic

Final
- Champion: (France) Marion Bartoli
- Runner-up: (Russia) Vera Zvonareva
- Score: 6–2, 6–2

Details
- Draw: 32
- Seeds: 8

Events
Singles	Doubles
← 2005 ·	ASB Classic	· 2007 →

Katarina Srebotnik was the defending champion, lost in the second round to Tzipora Obziler.

Marion Bartoli won the title, beating Vera Zvonareva 6–2, 6–2 in the final.

== Draw ==
=== Seeds ===
1. (Russia) Nadia Petrova (semifinals)
2. (Slovakia) Daniela Hantuchová (semifinals)
3. (Russia) Elena Likhovtseva (second round)
4. (Russia) Maria Kirilenko (quarterfinals)
5. (Slovenia) Katarina Srebotnik (second round)
6. (France) Marion Bartoli (champion)
7. (Japan) Shinobu Asagoe (first round)
8. (Russia) Vera Zvonareva (final)

=== Key ===
- Q = Qualifier
- WC = Wild card
- LL = Lucky loser
- Alt = Alternate
- ITF = ITF entry
- PR = Protected ranking
- SR = Special ranking
- SE = Special exempt
- JE = Junior exempt
- JR = Junior Accelerator Programme entrant
- CO = College Accelerator Programme entrant
- NG = Next Gen Accelerator Program entrant
- w/o = Walkover
- r = Retired
- d = Defaulted

=== Finals ===
Semifinals
1	(Russia) Nadia Petrova	6	4	1^{r}
6	(France) Marion Bartoli	3	6	2
8	(Russia) Vera Zvonareva	6	6
2	(Slovakia) Daniela Hantuchová	2	2

Final
6	(France) Marion Bartoli	6	6
8	(Russia) Vera Zvonareva	2	2

=== Top half ===
First round
1	(Russia) N Petrova	6	6
(Argentina) M Díaz Oliva	2	2
Q	(Luxembourg) A Kremer	3	3
(Russia) V Dushevina	6	6
(Puerto Rico) K Brandi	7	6
(Colombia) C Castaño	5	1
(Spain) M Sánchez Lorenzo	6	3	6
7	(Japan) S Asagoe	0	6	2
3	(Russia) E Likhovtseva	7	5	7
(Japan) A Morigami	5	7	5
WC	(Australia) J Dokić	7	6^{3}	1
(Germany) J Schruff	5	7^{7}	6
(United States) L Granville	6	1	6
Q	(United States) S Perry	3	6	3
(France) É Loit	7^{7}	3	1
6	(France) M Bartoli	6^{5}	6	6

Second round
1	(Russia) N Petrova	6	6
(Russia) V Dushevina	3	0
(Puerto Rico) K Brandi	6	6
(Spain) M Sánchez Lorenzo	4	1
3	(Russia) E Likhovtseva	5	6^{4}
(Germany) J Schruff	7	7^{7}
(United States) L Granville	6	2	2
6	(France) M Bartoli	3	6	6

Quarterfinals
1	(Russia) N Petrova	6	6
(Puerto Rico) K Brandi	1	2
(Germany) J Schruff	2	0
6	(France) M Bartoli	6	6

Semifinals
1	(Russia) N Petrova	6	4	1^{r}
6	(France) M Bartoli	3	6	2

=== Bottom half ===
First round
8	(Russia) V Zvonareva	6	6
(Argentina) P Suárez	2	3
(Israel) S Pe'er	6^{0}	4
(South Korea) Y-j Cho	7^{7}	6
WC	(Belarus) V Azarenka	6	5	6
(United States) A Frazier	2	7	4
(Czech Republic) O Blahotová	4	1
4	(Russia) M Kirilenko	6	6
5	(Slovenia) K Srebotnik	7	4	6
(Greece) E Daniilidou	5	6	3
(United States) J Jackson	3	2
Q	(Israel) T Obziler	6	6
(United States) J Craybas	2	6	7^{7}
Q	(United States) A Harkleroad	6	1	6^{4}
(Ukraine) Y Beygelzimer	6	3	2
2	(Slovakia) D Hantuchová	2	6	6

Second round
8	(Russia) V Zvonareva	6	2	6
(South Korea) Y-j Cho	3	6	1
WC	(Belarus) V Azarenka	3	6	3
4	(Russia) M Kirilenko	6	2	6
5	(Slovenia) K Srebotnik	3	4
Q	(Israel) T Obziler	6	6
(United States) J Craybas	3	1
2	(Slovakia) D Hantuchová	6	6

Quarterfinals
8	(Russia) V Zvonareva	6	6
4	(Russia) M Kirilenko	2	0
Q	(Israel) T Obziler	5	6	5
2	(Slovakia) D Hantuchová	7	3	7

Semifinals
8	(Russia) V Zvonareva	6	6
2	(Slovakia) D Hantuchová	2	2
