= 2012 Open GDF Suez – Doubles =

Doubles
- 2012 Open GDF Suez

Final
- Champions: (United States) Liezel Huber (United States) Lisa Raymond
- Runners-up: (Germany) Anna-Lena Grönefeld (Croatia) Petra Martić
- Score: 7–6^{(7–3)}, 6–1

Events
Singles	Doubles
← 2011 ·	Open GDF Suez	· 2013 →

Bethanie Mattek-Sands and Meghann Shaughnessy were the defending champions but Shaughnessy decided not to participate.
Mattek-Sands plays alongside Jarmila Gajdošová, but lost in the first round.
Liezel Huber and Lisa Raymond won the title, defeating Anna-Lena Grönefeld and Petra Martić 7–6^{(7–3)}, 6–1 in the final.

== Seeds ==
1. (United States) Liezel Huber / (United States) Lisa Raymond (champions)
2. (South Africa) Natalie Grandin / (Czech Republic) Vladimíra Uhlířová (first round)
3. (Australia) Jarmila Gajdošová / (United States) Bethanie Mattek-Sands (first round)
4. (Romania) Monica Niculescu / (Poland) Alicja Rosolska (semifinals, retired)

== Draw ==
=== Key ===
- Q = Qualifier
- WC = Wild card
- LL = Lucky loser
- Alt = Alternate
- SE = Special exempt
- PR = Protected ranking
- ITF = ITF entry
- JE = Junior exempt
- w/o = Walkover
- r = Retired
- d = Defaulted
- SR = Special ranking

=== Draw ===
First round
1	(United States) L Huber (United States) L Raymond	6	4	[10]
(Russia) M Kondratieva (France) S Lefevre	4	6	[6]
(Russia) N Bratchikova (Croatia) D Jurak	5	2
(Italy) A Brianti (France) A Cornet	7	6
4	(Romania) M Niculescu (Poland) A Rosolska	6	5	[10]
(Czech Republic) E Hrdinová (Czech Republic) K Plíšková	4	7	[6]
(Ukraine) M Koryttseva (Germany) J Wöhr	4	3
(Czech Republic) L Šafářová (Czech Republic) K Zakopalová	6	6
(Germany) A-L Grönefeld (Croatia) P Martić	3	6	[10]
(Romania) E Bogdan (Hungary) K Marosi	6	1	[7]
(Ukraine) L Kichenok (Ukraine) N Kichenok	6	6
3	(Australia) J Gajdošová (United States) B Mattek-Sands	2	2
(Latvia) L Dekmeijere (Austria) S Klemenschits	6	5	[6]
WC	(France) J Coin (France) P Parmentier	1	7	[10]
(United States) J Craybas (Czech Republic) B Záhlavová-Strýcová	7^{8}	2	[10]
2	(South Africa) N Grandin (Czech Republic) V Uhlířová	6^{6}	6	[6]

Quarterfinals
1	(United States) L Huber (United States) L Raymond	6	6
(Italy) A Brianti (France) A Cornet	3	2
4	(Romania) M Niculescu (Poland) A Rosolska	6	6
(Czech Republic) L Šafářová (Czech Republic) K Zakopalová	2	2
(Germany) A-L Grönefeld (Croatia) P Martić	6	6
(Ukraine) L Kichenok (Ukraine) N Kichenok	4	2
WC	(France) J Coin (France) P Parmentier	6	5	[7]
(United States) J Craybas (Czech Republic) B Záhlavová-Strýcová	2	7	[10]

Semifinals
1	(United States) L Huber (United States) L Raymond	w/o
4	(Romania) M Niculescu (Poland) A Rosolska
(Germany) A-L Grönefeld (Croatia) P Martić	7^{9}	6
(United States) J Craybas (Czech Republic) B Záhlavová-Strýcová	6^{7}	3

Final
1	(United States) L Huber (United States) L Raymond	7^{7}	6
(Germany) A-L Grönefeld (Croatia) P Martić	6^{3}	1
