= 2005 ASB Classic – Doubles =

Doubles
- 2005 ASB Classic

Final
- Champion: (Japan) Shinobu Asagoe (Slovenia) Katarina Srebotnik
- Runner-up: (New Zealand) Leanne Baker (Italy) Francesca Lubiani
- Score: 6–3, 6–3

Details
- Draw: 16
- Seeds: 4

Events
| Singles | Doubles |
| ← 2004 · | WTA Auckland Open | · 2006 → |

Mervana Jugić-Salkić and Jelena Kostanić were the defending champions, neither chose to compete in 2005.

Katarina Srebotnik and Shinobu Asagoe won the title.

== Draw ==
=== Seeds ===
1. (Japan) Shinobu Asagoe / (Slovenia) Katarina Srebotnik (winners)
2. (United States) Jill Craybas / (United States) Corina Morariu (first round)
3. (Slovenia) ~~Tina Križan~~ / (Hungary) ~~Petra Mandula~~ (withdrew due to a back injury on Mandula)
4. (Slovakia) Janette Husárová / (Russia) Lina Krasnoroutskaia (semifinals)
5. (United States) Abigail Spears / (United States) Meilen Tu (quarterfinals)

Key

- Q = Qualifier
- WC = Wild card
- LL = Lucky loser
- Alt = Alternate
- ITF = ITF entry
- PR = Protected ranking
- SR = Special ranking
- SE = Special exempt
- JE = Junior exempt
- JR = Junior Accelerator Programme entrant
- CO = College Accelerator Programme entrant
- NG = Next Gen Accelerator Program entrant
- w/o = Walkover
- r = Retired
- d = Defaulted

=== Results ===
First round
1 | (Japan) S Asagoe (Slovenia) K Srebotnik | 6 | 5 | 6
(United States) J Russell (Italy) M Santangelo | 0 | 7 | 1
(Spain) N Llagostera Vives (Croatia) S Talaja | 3 | 6^{5}
(Russia) A Jidkova (Ukraine) T Perebiynis | 6 | 7
5 | (United States) A Spears (United States) M Tu | 6 | 6
(Luxembourg) C Schaul (Romania) A Vanc | 2 | 3
(Australia) E Dominikovic (Russia) G Voskoboeva | 6 | 7
(South Africa) K Grant (United States) L Osterloh | 1 | 6^{6}
(Chinese Taipei) C-j Chuang (Japan) R Fujiwara | 7 | 6
(Germany) M Müller (Germany) J Wöhr | 5 | 2
Q | (Chinese Taipei) S-w Hsieh (Japan) Y Yoshida | 0 | 6 | 4
4 | (Slovakia) J Husárová (Russia) L Krasnoroutskaia | 6 | 2 | 6
LL | (New Zealand) M Erakovic (South Africa) C Scheepers | 5 | 0
(United States) T Ashley (United States) L Granville | 7 | 6
WC | (New Zealand) L Baker (Italy) F Lubiani | 6 | 2 | 6
2 | (United States) J Craybas (United States) C Morariu | 1 | 6 | 4

Quarterfinals
1 | (Japan) S Asagoe (Slovenia) K Srebotnik | 7 | 6
(Russia) A Jidkova (Ukraine) T Perebiynis | 5 | 3
5 | (United States) A Spears (United States) M Tu | 3 | 2
(Australia) E Dominikovic (Russia) G Voskoboeva | 6 | 6
(Chinese Taipei) C-j Chuang (Japan) R Fujiwara | 5 | 3
4 | (Slovakia) J Husárová (Russia) L Krasnoroutskaia | 7 | 6
(United States) T Ashley (United States) L Granville | 5 | 7 | 6^{3}
WC | (New Zealand) L Baker (Italy) F Lubiani | 7 | 6^{2} | 7

Semifinals
1 | (Japan) S Asagoe (Slovenia) K Srebotnik | 6 | 6
(Australia) E Dominikovic (Russia) G Voskoboeva | 3 | 3
4 | (Slovakia) J Husárová (Russia) L Krasnoroutskaia
WC | (New Zealand) L Baker (Italy) F Lubiani | w/o

Final
1 | (Japan) S Asagoe (Slovenia) K Srebotnik | 6 | 6
WC | (New Zealand) L Baker (Italy) F Lubiani | 3 | 3
