= 2006 ASB Classic – Doubles =

Doubles
- 2006 ASB Classic

Final
- Champions: (Russia) Elena Likhovtseva (Russia) Vera Zvonareva
- Runners-up: (France) Émilie Loit (Czech Republic) Barbora Strýcová
- Score: 6–3, 6–4

Details
- Draw: 16
- Seeds: 4

Events
| Singles | Doubles |
| ← 2005 · | WTA Auckland Open | · 2007 → |

Shinobu Asagoe and Katarina Srebotnik were the defending champions, but lost in semifinals to tournament winners Elena Likhovtseva and Vera Zvonareva.

Likhovtseva and Zvonareva won the title by defeating Émilie Loit and Barbora Strýcová 6–3, 6–4 in the final.

== Seeds ==
1. (Russia) Elena Likhovtseva / (Russia) Vera Zvonareva (champions)
2. (Russia) Maria Kirilenko / (Argentina) Paola Suárez (first round)
3. (Japan) Shinobu Asagoe / (Slovenia) Katarina Srebotnik (semifinals)
4. (France) Émilie Loit / (Czech Republic) Barbora Strýcová (final)

== Draw ==
=== Key ===
- Q = Qualifier
- WC = Wild card
- LL = Lucky loser
- Alt = Alternate
- ITF = ITF entry
- PR = Protected ranking
- SR = Special ranking
- SE = Special exempt
- JE = Junior exempt
- JR = Junior Accelerator Programme entrant
- CO = College Accelerator Programme entrant
- NG = Next Gen Accelerator Program entrant
- w/o = Walkover
- r = Retired
- d = Defaulted

=== Draw ===
First round
1 | (Russia) E Likhovtseva (Russia) V Zvonareva | 6 | 6
WC | (New Zealand) L Baker (Italy) F Lubiani | 4 | 1
(Croatia) J Kostanić (Germany) M Müller | 7 | 6
(Russia) V Dushevina (Israel) S Pe'er | 5 | 1
3 | (Japan) S Asagoe (Slovenia) K Srebotnik | 6 | 6
(Slovenia) T Križan (United States) J Russell | 3 | 2
(Ukraine) M Koryttseva (Russia) G Voskoboeva | 7^{7} | 2 | 6
(Latvia) L Dekmeijere (United States) A Harkleroad | 6^{2} | 6 | 1
(United Kingdom) C Curran (South Africa) N Grandin | 7 | 6
(United States) J Craybas (United States) M Tu | 5 | 2
(United States) L Granville (United States) A Spears | 6 | 2 | 4
4 | (France) É Loit (Czech Republic) B Strýcová | 4 | 6 | 6
(Greece) E Daniilidou (Germany) J Wöhr | 3 | 6^{4}
(Ukraine) Y Beygelzimer (Bosnia and Herzegovina) M Jugić-Salkić | 6 | 7^{7}
Q | (Germany) J Schruff (Hungary) Á Szávay | 4 | 6 | 6
2 | (Russia) M Kirilenko (Argentina) P Suárez | 6 | 3 | 4

Quarterfinals
1 | (Russia) E Likhovtseva (Russia) V Zvonareva | 6 | 6
(Croatia) J Kostanić (Germany) M Müller | 2 | 2
3 | (Japan) S Asagoe (Slovenia) K Srebotnik | 6 | 2 | 6
(Ukraine) M Koryttseva (Russia) G Voskoboeva | 1 | 6 | 1
(United Kingdom) C Curran (South Africa) N Grandin | 2 | 3
4 | (France) É Loit (Czech Republic) B Strýcová | 6 | 6
(Ukraine) Y Beygelzimer (Bosnia and Herzegovina) M Jugić-Salkić | w/o
Q | (Germany) J Schruff (Hungary) Á Szávay

Semifinals
1 | (Russia) E Likhovtseva (Russia) V Zvonareva | 7 | 3 | 7
3 | (Japan) S Asagoe (Slovenia) K Srebotnik | 5 | 6 | 5
4 | (France) É Loit (Czech Republic) B Strýcová | 6 | 6
(Ukraine) Y Beygelzimer (Bosnia and Herzegovina) M Jugić-Salkić | 3 | 3

Final
1 | (Russia) E Likhovtseva (Russia) V Zvonareva | 6 | 6
4 | (France) É Loit (Czech Republic) B Strýcová | 3 | 4
