= 2004 ASB Classic =

- Date: 5–10 January
- Edition: 19th
- Category: WTA Tier IV
- Draw: 32S / 16D
- Prize money: $140,000
- Surface: Hard / outdoor
- Location: Auckland, New Zealand
- Venue: ASB Tennis Centre

Champions

Singles
- (Greece) Eleni Daniilidou

Doubles
- (Bosnia and Herzegovina) Mervana Jugić-Salkić (Croatia) Jelena Kostanić
- WTA Auckland Open

The 2004 ASB Classic was a women's tennis tournament played on outdoor hard courts at the ASB Tennis Centre in Auckland, New Zealand, that was part of Tier IV of the 2004 WTA Tour. It was the 19th edition of the tournament and took place from 5 January until 10 January 2004. Third-seeded Eleni Daniilidou won her second consecutive singles title at the event and earned $22,000 first-prize money.

== Finals ==
=== Singles ===
(Greece) Eleni Daniilidou defeated (United States) Ashley Harkleroad, 6–3, 6–2

- It was Daniilidou 1st singles title of the year and the 4th of her career.

=== Doubles ===
- (Bosnia and Herzegovina) Mervana Jugić-Salkić / (Croatia) Jelena Kostanić defeated (Spain) Virginia Ruano Pascual / (Argentina) Paola Suárez, 7–6^{(8–6)}, 3–6, 6–1

== Prize money and ranking points ==
=== Prize money ===
Event	W	F	SF	QF	Round of 16	Round of 32	Q3	Q2	Q1
Singles	$22,000	$12,000	$6,300	$3,400	$1,825	$1,000	$550	$300	$175
Doubles *	$6,500	$3,475	$1,850	$1,000	$550	—N/a	—N/a	—N/a	—N/a

_{* per team}

=== Points distribution ===
Event	W	F	SF	QF	Round of 16	Round of 32
Singles	95	67	43	24	12	1
Doubles	95	67	43	24	1	—N/a

== See also ==
- 2004 Heineken Open – men's tournament
