= 2013 Open GDF Suez – Doubles =

Doubles
- 2013 Open GDF Suez

Final
- Champions: (Italy) Sara Errani (Italy) Roberta Vinci
- Runners-up: (Czech Republic) Andrea Hlaváčková (United States) Liezel Huber
- Score: 6–1, 6–1

Events
Singles	Doubles
← 2012 ·	Open GDF Suez	· 2014 →

Liezel Huber and Lisa Raymond were the defending champions, but Raymond decided not to participate.
Huber played alongside Andrea Hlaváčková and lost in the final to Sara Errani and Roberta Vinci, 1–6, 1–6.

== Seeds ==
1. (Italy) Sara Errani / (Italy) Roberta Vinci (champions)
2. (Czech Republic) Andrea Hlaváčková / (United States) Liezel Huber (final)
3. (Germany) Julia Görges / (Romania) Monica Niculescu (first round)
4. (Czech Republic) Květa Peschke / (Poland) Alicja Rosolska (second round)

== Draw ==
=== Key ===
- Q = Qualifier
- WC = Wild card
- LL = Lucky loser
- Alt = Alternate
- SE = Special exempt
- PR = Protected ranking
- ITF = ITF entry
- JE = Junior exempt
- w/o = Walkover
- r = Retired
- d = Defaulted
- SR = Special ranking

First round
1	(Italy) S Errani (Italy) R Vinci	6	6
(France) A Cornet (France) K Mladenovic	1	2
(Belarus) E Dzehalevich (Bosnia and Herzegovina) M Jugić-Salkić	3	0
WC	(France) J Coin (France) P Parmentier	6	6
4	(Czech Republic) K Peschke (Poland) A Rosolska	3	6	[10]
(Austria) T Paszek (Czech Republic) K Zakopalová	6	0	[8]
(Russia) A Pavlyuchenkova (Czech Republic) L Šafářová	6	4	[10]
(Croatia) D Jurak (Hungary) K Marosi	4	6	[5]
(Russia) V Dushevina (Spain) A Medina Garrigues	6	4	[10]
(Luxembourg) M Minella (United States) M Moulton-Levy	1	6	[7]
(Serbia) V Dolonc (Slovakia) J Husárová	6	2	[11]
3	(Germany) J Görges (Romania) M Niculescu	2	6	[9]
(South Africa) N Grandin (Czech Republic) V Uhlířová	4	6^{2}
(Latvia) L Dekmeijere (France) S Foretz Gacon	6	7^{7}
WC	(Czech Republic) P Kvitová (Belgium) Y Wickmayer	6^{6}	6	[1]
2	(Czech Republic) A Hlaváčková (United States) L Huber	7^{8}	4	[10]

Quarterfinals
1	(Italy) S Errani (Italy) R Vinci	4	6	[11]
WC	(France) J Coin (France) P Parmentier	6	2	[9]
4	(Czech Republic) K Peschke (Poland) A Rosolska	2	3
(Russia) A Pavlyuchenkova (Czech Republic) L Šafářová	6	6
(Russia) V Dushevina (Spain) A Medina Garrigues	4	7	[12]
(Serbia) V Dolonc (Slovakia) J Husárová	6	5	[10]
(Latvia) L Dekmeijere (France) S Foretz Gacon	2	3
2	(Czech Republic) A Hlaváčková (United States) L Huber	6	6

Semifinals
1	(Italy) S Errani (Italy) R Vinci	w/o
(Russia) A Pavlyuchenkova (Czech Republic) L Šafářová
(Russia) V Dushevina (Spain) A Medina Garrigues	6	4	4
2	(Czech Republic) A Hlaváčková (United States) L Huber	4	6	[10]

Final
1	(Italy) S Errani (Italy) R Vinci	6	6
2	(Czech Republic) A Hlaváčková (United States) L Huber	1	1
