= 2005 ASB Classic =

- Date: 3–8 January
- Edition: 20th
- Category: WTA Tier IV
- Draw: 32S / 16D
- Prize money: USD140,000
- Surface: Hard / Outdoor
- Location: Auckland, New Zealand
- Venue: ASB Tennis Centre

Champions

Singles
- (Slovakia) Katarina Srebotnik

Doubles
- (Japan) Shinobu Asagoe / (Croatia) Jelena Kostanić
- WTA Auckland Open

The 2005 ASB Classic was a women's tennis tournament played on outdoor hard courts at the ASB Tennis Centre in Auckland, New Zealand, that was part of Tier IV of the 2005 WTA Tour. It was the 20th edition of the tournament and took place from 3 January until 8 January 2005. Unseeded Katarina Srebotnik won the singles title and earned $22,000 first-prize money.

== Finals ==
=== Singles ===
(Slovakia) Katarina Srebotnik defeated (Japan) Shinobu Asagoe, 5–7, 7–5, 6–4

- It was Srebotnik's 1st singles title of the year and the 3rd of her career.

=== Doubles ===
- (Japan) Shinobu Asagoe / (Slovakia) Katarina Srebotnik defeated (New Zealand) Leanne Baker / (Italy) Francesca Lubiani, 6–3, 6–3

== Prize money and ranking points ==
=== Prize money ===
Event	W	F	SF	QF	Round of 16	Round of 32	Q3	Q2	Q1
Singles	$22,000	$12,000	$6,300	$3,400	$1,825	$1,000	$550	$300	$175
Doubles *	$6,500	$3,475	$1,850	$1,000	$550	—N/a	—N/a	—N/a	—N/a

_{* per team}

=== Points distribution ===
Event	W	F	SF	QF	Round of 16	Round of 32
Singles	95	67	43	24	12	1
Doubles	95	67	43	24	1	—N/a

== See also ==
- 2005 Heineken Open – men's tournament
