= 2012 Open GDF Suez =

- Date: 4–12 February
- Edition: 20th
- Category: Premier
- Draw: 30S / 16D
- Prize money: $637,000
- Surface: Hard / indoor
- Location: Paris, France
- Venue: Stade Pierre de Coubertin

Champions

Singles
- (Germany) Angelique Kerber

Doubles
- (United States) Liezel Huber / (United States) Lisa Raymond
- Open GDF Suez

The 2012 Open GDF Suez was a women's professional tennis tournament played on indoor hard courts. It was the 20th edition of the Open GDF Suez (formerly known as the Open Gaz de France) and was a Premier tournament on the 2012 WTA Tour. It took place at Stade Pierre de Coubertin in Paris, France from 4 February through 12 February 2012.

== Finals ==
=== Singles ===
(Germany) Angelique Kerber defeated (France) Marion Bartoli, 7–6^{(7–3)}, 5–7, 6–3

- It was Kerber's 1st career title. She became the first German winner at Paris since Steffi Graf in 1995.

=== Doubles ===
(United States) Liezel Huber / (United States) Lisa Raymond defeated (Germany) Anna-Lena Grönefeld / (Croatia) Petra Martić, 7–6^{(7–3)}, 6–1

== Singles main-draw entrants ==
=== Seeds ===
Country	Player	Ranking^{1}	Seeding
RUS	Maria Sharapova	3	1
FRA	Marion Bartoli	7	2
CHN	Li Na	9	3
SRB	~~Jelena Janković~~	13	4
GER	~~Sabine Lisicki~~	14	5
GER	Julia Görges	21	6
ITA	Roberta Vinci	23	7
ESP	Anabel Medina Garrigues	24	8
GER	Angelique Kerber	27	9

- ^{1} Rankings as of January 30, 2012

=== Other entrants ===
The following players received wildcards into the main draw:

- (France) Alizé Cornet
- (France) Pauline Parmentier

The following players received entry from the qualifying draw:

- (Hungary) Gréta Arn
- (Germany) Kristina Barrois
- (Germany) Mona Barthel
- (United States) Bethanie Mattek-Sands

The following players received entry as lucky losers into the singles main draw:

- (Italy) Alberta Brianti
- (United States) Jill Craybas
- (United States) Varvara Lepchenko

=== Withdrawals ===
- (Serbia) Jelena Janković (left thigh injury)
- (Estonia) Kaia Kanepi (right shoulder injury)
- (Germany) Sabine Lisicki (viral illness)

=== Retirements ===
- (United States) Jill Craybas (right leg injury)
- (China) Li Na (lower back injury)

== Doubles main-draw entrants ==
=== Seeds ===
Country	Player	Country	Player	Rank^{1}	Seed
USA	Liezel Huber	USA	Lisa Raymond	3	1
RSA	Natalie Grandin	CZE	Vladimíra Uhlířová	59	2
AUS	Jarmila Gajdošová	USA	Bethanie Mattek-Sands	63	3
ROU	Monica Niculescu	POL	Alicja Rosolska	81	4

- ^{1} Rankings are as of January 30, 2012

=== Other entrants ===
The following pair received wildcard into the doubles main draw:

- (France) Julie Coin / (France) Pauline Parmentier

=== Retirements ===
- (Romania) Monica Niculescu (abdominal injury)
