= Marion Bartoli =

French tennis player (born 1984)

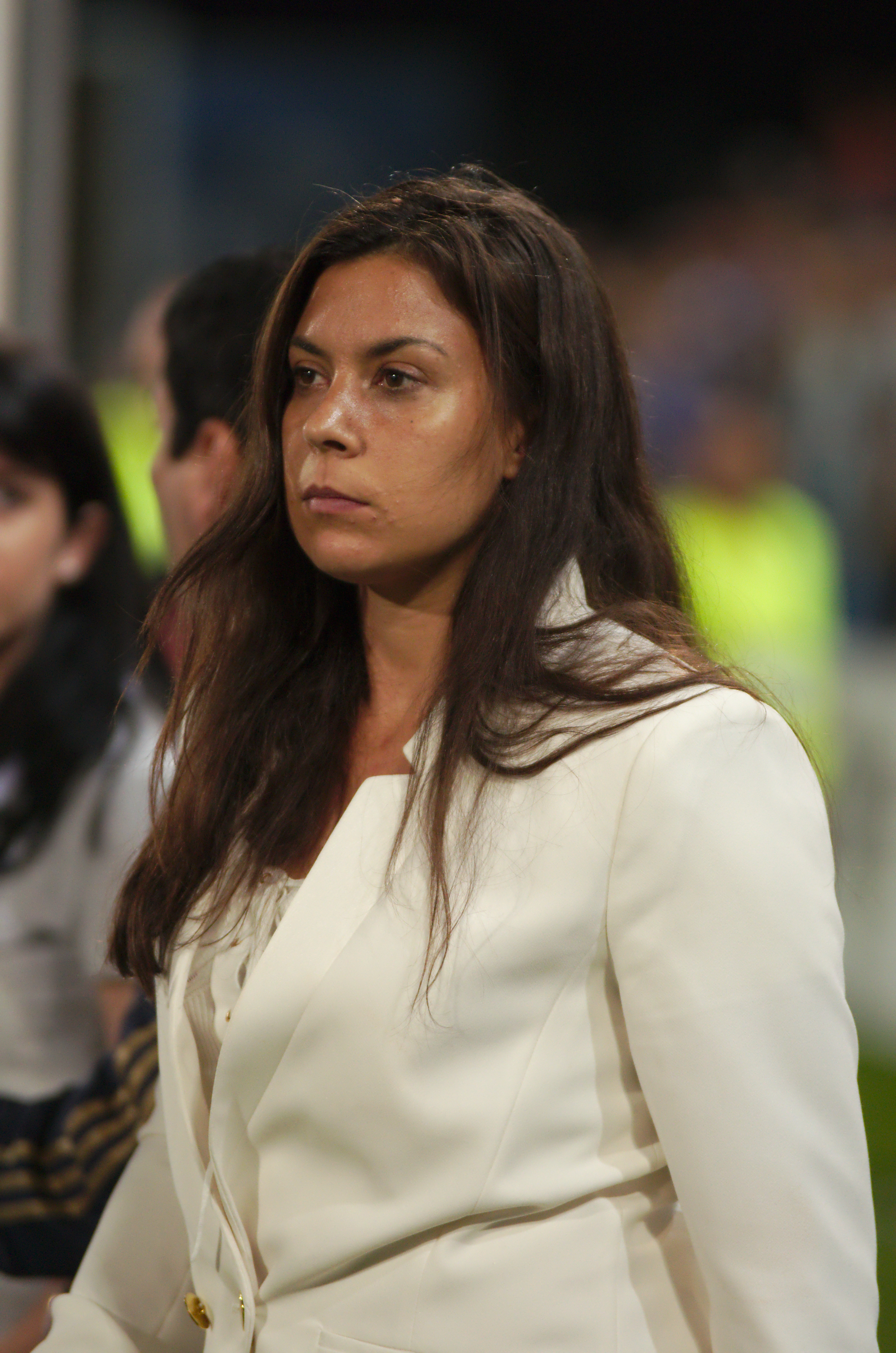
- Bartoli at the Valais Cup in 2013
- Country (sports): France
- Residence: Geneva, Switzerland
- Born: 2 October 1984 (age 42) Le Puy-en-Velay, Haute-Loire, France
- Height: 1.72 m (5 ft 8 in)
- Turned pro: February 2000
- Retired: 14 August 2013
- Plays: Right-handed (two-handed both sides)
- Prize money: $11,055,114

Singles
- Career record: 490–299
- Career titles: 8
- Highest ranking: No. 7 (30 January 2012)

Grand Slam singles results
- Australian Open: QF (2009)
- French Open: SF (2011)
- Wimbledon: W (2013)
- US Open: QF (2012)

Other tournaments
- Tour Finals: RR (2007, 2011)

Doubles
- Career record: 117–82
- Career titles: 3
- Highest ranking: No. 15 (5 July 2004)

Grand Slam doubles results
- Australian Open: 3R (2004, 2005)
- French Open: 3R (2005, 2006)
- Wimbledon: QF (2004)
- US Open: SF (2003)

Team competitions
- Fed Cup: F (2004)
- Hopman Cup: F (2012)

Marion Bartoli (French: [maʁjɔ̃ baʁtɔli]; born 2 October 1984) is a French former professional tennis player. Bartoli won the 2013 Wimbledon Championships singles title, after previously being runner-up in 2007, and was a semifinalist at the 2011 French Open. She also won seven singles and three doubles titles on the WTA Tour.

Bartoli was known for her unorthodox style of play, using both hands on her forehand and backhand. On 30 January 2012, she reached a career-high ranking of world No. 7; she returned to this ranking on 8 July 2013, after triumphing at Wimbledon. Bartoli reached the quarterfinals at each of the four majors. Her win at Wimbledon made her only the sixth player in the Open Era to win the title without losing a set. She is also one of only three players to have played at both the WTA Tour Championships and the WTA Tournament of Champions (later renamed the WTA Elite Trophy) in the same year (2011); the other two being Kiki Bertens and Sofia Kenin.

== Early life and personal life ==
Marion Bartoli was born on 2 October 1984 in Le Puy-en-Velay, Haute-Loire. She is of Corsican descent; her family is from Palneca, Corse-du-Sud.

Bartoli was introduced to tennis by her father, Walter, when she was six years old and often trained on small, icy courts or in cramped indoor spaces, shaping her aggressive style. Her father used creative drills to improve her coordination and kept her agile. She travelled to tournaments with him, doing homework on the road. She turned professional by early 2000 and would remain on the pro tour until late 2013.

In December 2019, Bartoli married Belgian football player Yahya Boumediene. Their daughter was born a year later.

== Career ==
=== Early years ===
Bartoli started entering tournaments regularly at the age of 16. After a few aborted starts in 1999 and 2000, she played in the $10,000 clay events in the spring of 2001. Winning two tournaments back to back in May (in Hatfield and Torino) ensured that she would be given a wildcard into her first Grand Slam, the French Open, where she lost to Catalina Castaño in the first round. Bartoli also won another tournament in Koksijde, Belgium.

In 2002, she received a wildcard into the Australian Open. She lost to Tina Pisnik in three sets. She then won her fourth ITF title in Columbus, Ohio. She followed that with a first-round exit at the French Open, losing in three sets to Ai Sugiyama. In the US Open where she qualified, she defeated Arantxa Sánchez Vicario, which was Bartoli's first win over a player in the top 100. She followed that with a win over Rossana de los Ríos, before losing to fourth seed Lindsay Davenport.

=== 2003: US Open doubles semifinal ===
Bartoli began 2003 by coming through the qualifying draw in the Canberra International to reach her first WTA Tour semifinal, where she lost to Francesca Schiavone. At the Australian Open where she earned her place in a major through her ranking for the first time, she lost to 11th seed Magdalena Maleeva in the first round. She qualified for Key Biscayne and made it to the quarterfinals, after Lindsay Davenport retired in their fourth-round match due to injury. In the quarterfinal, she lost to Serena Williams.

In the Internationaux de Strasbourg, Bartoli reached the quarterfinals where she lost to Vera Zvonareva. At the French Open, she earned another victory over Rossana de los Ríos, but lost to Jennifer Capriati in the second round. At her first Wimbledon, she drew ninth seed Daniela Hantuchová in the first round, and lost.

At the San Diego Open, Bartoli defeated her first top-20 player, Meghann Shaughnessy, before losing to Kim Clijsters in the third round. At the US Open she lost to Hantuchová in the first round. But in doubles, she reached her first and only semifinal of doubles at Grand Slams. At the end of the year, she reached the quarterfinals of Bell Challenge, losing to Milagros Sequera.

=== 2004 ===
Bartoli began the season by getting to her first WTA semifinal in the season-opener in Auckland. She then got to the second round of the Australian Open for the first time, losing to 22nd-seeded Patty Schnyder.

In February Bartoli played at the Hyderabad Open, where she defeated Ankita Bhambri, Galina Fokina, and Mervana Jugić-Salkić to reach the semifinals, before losing to eventual champion Nicole Pratt. This performance briefly made her a top-50 player.

Bartoli refound her doubles form of late 2003. Partnering compatriot Émilie Loit, she reached the semifinals of Acapulco, the quarterfinals of Indian Wells, and then Bartoli won her first WTA doubles title in Casablanca.

After a forgettable singles clay-court season (culminating in her second loss to Sugiyama at her native Grand Slam event), she climbed back up the rankings by reaching the third round of Wimbledon (losing to Sugiyama for the second successive Grand Slam). She also got to the quarterfinals of Wimbledon in doubles, partnering Loit for the second successive Grand Slam (they had failed to get beyond the second round of the French Open). Bartoli got to her third singles semifinal of the year in Cincinnati, before pulling out of her match with Lindsay Davenport with a blister on her right hand. She reached the second round of the US Open, despite being drawn against 32nd-seeded Meghann Shaughnessy in the first round. She lost to Russian Vera Dushevina in the second round.

In the absence of Amélie Mauresmo and Mary Pierce due to injuries, Bartoli received her debut Fed Cup call-up for France's semifinals against Spain. She was teamed with Loit again and helped complete a 5–0 whitewash of the Spanish team. In the final against Russia, Bartoli's and Loit's doubles match against Myskina and Vera Zvonareva was the decisive rubber. The Russian pair won, earning the Fed Cup for Russia for the first time. As a result, Bartoli's team leader Guy Forget resigned, and she was not chosen by the new team leader Georges Goven to play in 2005.

She ended 2004 ranked world No. 41, having gone 30–24 over the year. Her hard-court record was 23–13, with clay going 4–7, grass 3–3, and carpet 0–1.

=== 2005 ===
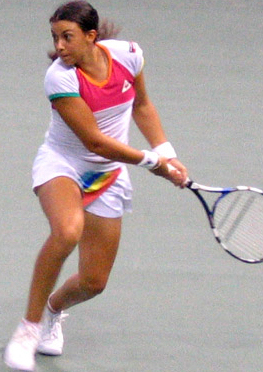
Bartoli at the JP Morgan Chase Open, 2005

After a promising start (semifinals in Auckland and quarterfinals in Canberra), which took her to world No. 32 and winning the second doubles tournament of her career in Pattaya City, injury disrupted the second quarter of 2005. The only match Bartoli played in the clay-court season was her straight-sets first-round loss to Shahar Pe'er at the French Open (where she was seeded for the first time, 28th). Her quarterfinal run at Eastbourne (where she had to retire hurt) led her to a career-high ranking of No. 27 at the start of Wimbledon, where she lost to Jill Craybas in the second round.

Highlights of the year were reaching the third round of the US Open for the second time (losing to Sania Mirza) and making her second WTA semifinal of the year (and fifth of her career) in Québec.

Her end-of-season statistics were 35–26, albeit padded by a victory in a satellite tournament in Doha at the end of the year. She went 30–21 on hard courts, 0–1 on clay, 3–3 on grass, and 2–1 on carpet. She was now ranked world No. 40.

=== 2006: First WTA Tour title and top 20 ===
In January 2006, Bartoli at 21 years of age won her first senior title at the Auckland Open in New Zealand, beating Vera Zvonareva in the final. She then lost in the second round of the first three Grand Slam events of the year (losing to Roberta Vinci in Australia, Jelena Janković in Paris, and Karolina Šprem at Wimbledon, all in three sets), but she won her third career doubles title by capturing the ECM Prague Open with Shahar Pe'er in May.

The North American summer hardcourt season was very productive for Bartoli, as she reached the third round (and in some cases that meant the quarterfinals) of five of the seven tournaments she entered, including the US Open, where she again lost in the third round, this time to seventh-seeded Patty Schnyder. The following week she beat Schnyder en route to her second final of the year in Bali, where she lost to world No. 5 Svetlana Kuznetsova.

In October, Bartoli won her second singles title at the Japan Open, beating Aiko Nakamura in the final. This was the first ever WTA Tour-level final contested by two players using two-handed strokes on both the forehand and backhand. As a result of winning the title, Bartoli broke into the top 20 for the first time. In her last event of the year, she captured the Bell Challenge in Québec, defeating Olga Puchkova without losing a game in the final.

Bartoli finished the year ranked world no. 17. Her record was 45–28, her best on tour so far. That consisted of 37–17 on hard courts, 4–6 on clay, 3–3 on grass, and 1–2 on carpet. She was 3–6 against top-10 players.

=== 2007: First Grand Slam final ===
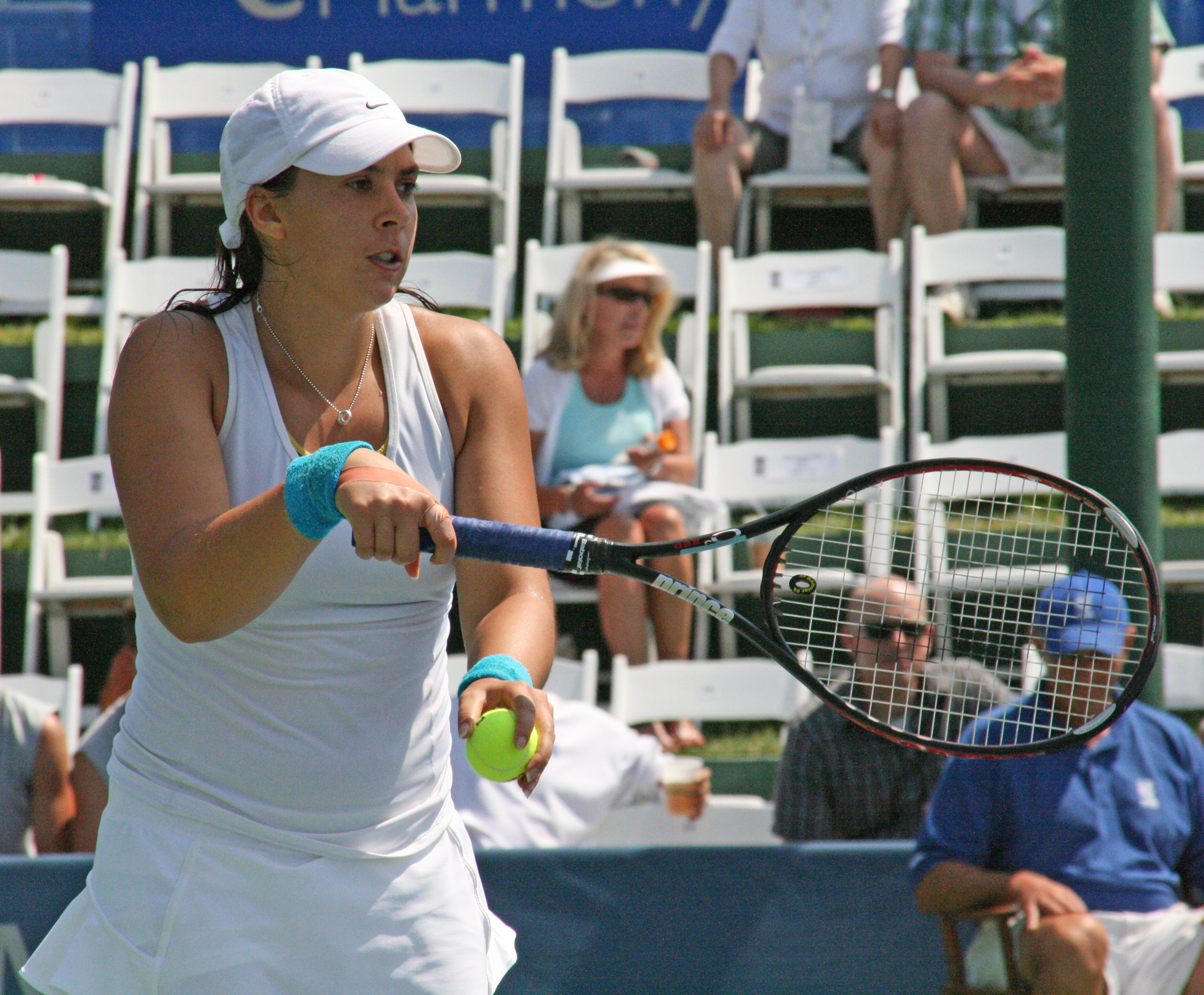
Marion Bartoli at the 2007 Acura Classic

Bartoli began 2007 with another second-round exit at the Australian Open, this time falling to Victoria Azarenka. In the clay-court season, she reached the final of the ECM Prague Open in May, losing to Akiko Morigami. After reaching the semifinals in Strasbourg, she lost to Amélie Mauresmo. Bartoli reached her first career Grand Slam fourth round at the French Open by defeating Aravane Rezaï, Andrea Petkovic, and 13th seed Elena Dementieva. In the fourth round, she was knocked out by fourth seed Jelena Janković, though Bartoli injured her back during this match. In the grass-court season, she reached the semifinals at Birmingham, where she lost to Maria Sharapova. She also reached the semifinals at Eastbourne, but lost to world No. 1 Justine Henin.

At Wimbledon, Bartoli advanced to her first Grand Slam final after defeating top-seeded and world № 1 ranked Justine Henin in the semifinal. Bartoli lost the first set before winning in three, and claimed afterwards that the reason for her shocking turnaround was seeing Pierce Brosnan in the royal box and being determined to play well in front of one of her favourite actors. In the final, Bartoli lost to the three-time former champion Venus Williams, but rose to an up to then career high of No. 11 in the WTA rankings. At the US Open, Bartoli reached the fourth round for the first time by defeating the world No. 25 Lucie Šafářová, but lost to Serena Williams. At the Luxembourg Open, she reached her first semifinal since her Wimbledon run, but then lost to Daniela Hantuchová.

At the Tier I event in Zurich Bartoli reached the quarterfinals, where she retired due to injury against Tatiana Golovin. Despite her injury, Bartoli played at the Generali Ladies Linz in Austria, and reached the semifinals, where she was defeated by Patty Schnyder. This ended her hopes of reaching the WTA Championships. However, after Serena Williams withdrew, Bartoli entered the event and played in the yellow group, where she lost to Justine Henin without winning a game, but defeated Jelena Janković after the Serbian retired. Her final record for the year was 47–31, with 19–16 on hard courts, 14–7 on clay, 12–3 on grass, and 2–5 on carpet. Her record against top-10 players was 4–8. Despite not having earned a single title all year, she ended the year at world No. 10.

=== 2008 ===
At the Australian Open, Bartoli was upset by Sofia Arvidsson, after being up a break in both the second and third sets. At the Open Gaz de France, Bartoli made it to the semifinals following easy wins over Virginie Razzano and Dominika Cibulková. She lost her semifinal match to Anna Chakvetadze.

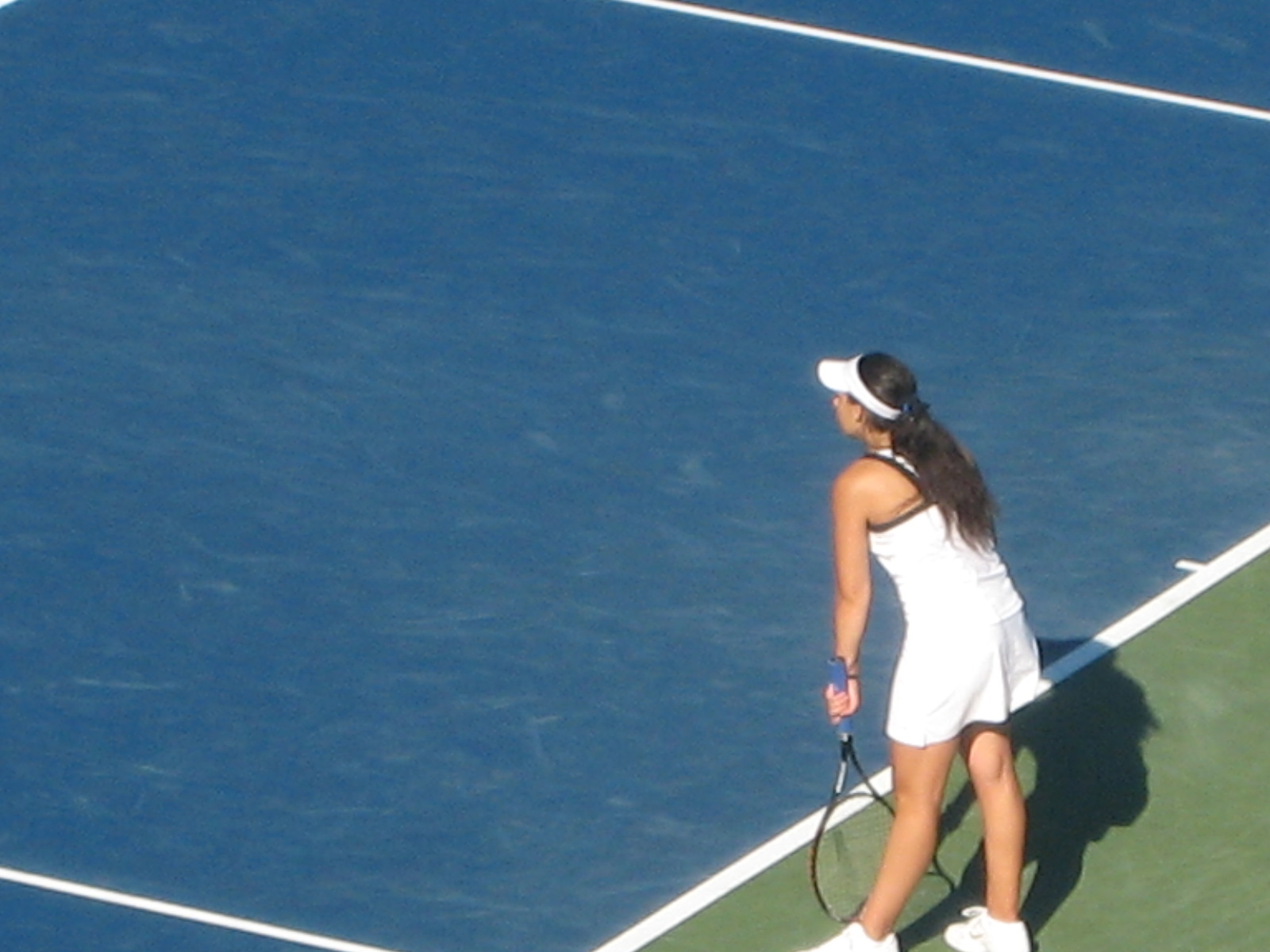
Bartoli at the 2008 Pilot Pen tournament where she beat Tsvetana Pironkova 2–6, 6–4, 7–5

At the French Open, she played through injury and was defeated by Casey Dellacqua in the first round. At Eastbourne, she defeated Sybille Bammer and Alisa Kleybanova and reached the semifinals, where she lost to eventual champion Agnieszka Radwańska. At Wimbledon, she was seeded 11th and defeated Sabine Lisicki and Tathiana Perebiynis. She was then upset by Bethanie Mattek, suffering calf and shoulder injuries.

Seeded sixth at the Stanford Classic, Bartoli defeated Akgul Amanmuradova, Anne Keothavong, defending champion Anna Chakvetadze, and Ai Sugiyama, to move into her first final since Wimbledon in 2007. In the final, Bartoli lost to the Canadian qualifier Aleksandra Wozniak. In Montreal, she beat Melanie South, Anna Chakvetadze and Ai Sugiyama to reach the semifinals, where she was defeated by Dominika Cibulková. At the US Open, Bartoli was seeded 12th and beat Galina Voskoboeva, Virginia Ruano Pascual and former champion and 23rd seed Lindsay Davenport to reach the fourth round, where she lost to 29th-seeded Sybille Bammer.

=== 2009: Australian Open quarterfinal ===
Bartoli's first event during the new WTA calendar was the inaugural Brisbane International. She was seeded third and defeated Monika Wejnert, Melinda Czink, and Tathiana Garbin. During the semifinal against Amélie Mauresmo, the latter had to retire due to injury; securing Bartoli a place in the final, which she lost to Victoria Azarenka.

Seeded 16th at the Australian Open, Bartoli defeated Melanie South, Tsvetana Pironkova, Lucie Šafářová and top seed Jelena Janković to reach the quarterfinals, where she lost to seventh seed Vera Zvonareva. Bartoli won her fourth career title at the Monterrey Open. Seeded second, she beat Michaëlla Krajicek, Magdaléna Rybáriková, Vania King, and Zheng Jie to reach the final, where she defeated unseeded Li Na.

In Charleston, Bartoli was seeded sixth and defeated Anastasija Sevastova, Melanie Oudin, and Melinda Czink to reach the semifinals, where she lost to eventual champion Sabine Lisicki. At the French Open, Bartoli won her opening match against fellow Frenchwoman Pauline Parmentier, but was then defeated by Tathiana Garbin in the second round. Seeded 12th at Wimbledon, Bartoli defeated Chan Yung-jan without losing a game in the first round. She then defeated Timea Bacsinszky in the second round, but fell to Francesca Schiavone in the third.

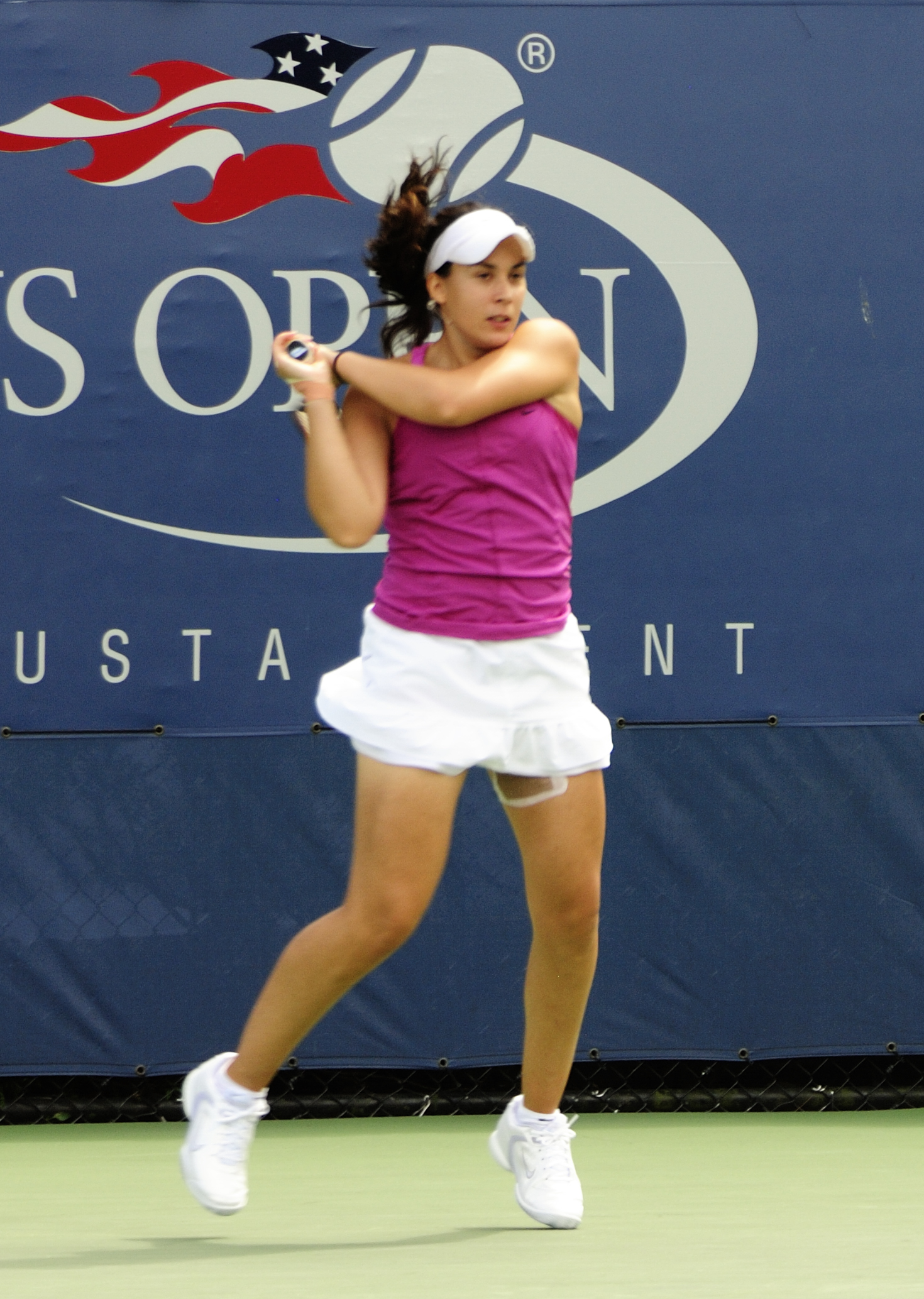
Bartoli at the 2009 US Open

Bartoli played her first tournament of the US Open Series in Stanford as eighth seed. She won the title by defeating Ayumi Morita, Melanie Oudin, Jelena Janković, Samantha Stosur in the semifinals, and second seed Venus Williams in the final, to win her second title of the year and fifth overall. Seeded 14th at the US Open, Bartoli beat Rossana de los Ríos, but lost to eventual champion Kim Clijsters. At the Pan Pacific Open in Tokyo, Bartoli was seeded 14th and reached the quarterfinals, where she lost to seventh seed Jelena Janković.

Seeded 14, Bartoli reached the semifinals of the China Open in Beijing. She defeated Magdaléna Rybáriková, Alisa Kleybanova, Zhang Shuai, and Vera Zvonareva. In the semifinals, she lost to 12th seed Agnieszka Radwańska. At the Commonwealth Bank Tournament of Champions in Bali, Bartoli defeated Rybáriková, and qualified for the semifinals when she beat Shahar Pe'er. She then defeated Kimiko Date-Krumm. In the final against Aravane Rezaï Bartoli retired due to injury.

=== 2010: Without a final ===
Bartoli started her year as the 11th seed at the Australian Open. She defeated Rossana de los Ríos in the first round and Sandra Záhlavová in the second. In the third round she lost to unseeded and eventual semifinalist Zheng Jie. At the Miami Open, Bartoli defeated Magdaléna Rybáriková, Gisela Dulko, top seed and world No. 4, Svetlana Kuznetsova, and Yanina Wickmayer to reach the semifinals, where she lost to world No. 5, Venus Williams.

In the French Open, Bartoli, as the 12th seed and French No. 1, beat Maria Elena Camerin in the first round and wildcard Olivia Sanchez in the second, but was defeated by Shahar Pe'er in the third round. Seeded eighth at the Eastbourne International, she defeated Vera Dushevina, Ágnes Szávay and María José Martínez Sánchez to reach the semifinals for the fourth consecutive year before she lost to Victoria Azarenka. Bartoli was seeded 11th at Wimbledon and defeated Julia Görges in the first round; she then moved straight into the third round, after Petra Martić withdrew from the tournament with suspected injury. In the third round, she defeated qualifier Gréta Arn, before falling in the fourth round to eventual semifinalist Tsvetana Pironkova.

At the Stanford Classic in California, where she was defending her title, she defeated Ashley Harkleroad and Ana Ivanovic to reach the quarterfinals, where she lost to Victoria Azarenka. Bartoli also reached the quarterfinals at the Cincinnati Open, after defeating Anabel Medina Garrigues, Alona Bondarenko and world No. 3, Caroline Wozniacki. In the quarterfinals, she was defeated by tenth seed Maria Sharapova. Bartoli managed a further quarterfinal appearance at the Rogers Cup in Montreal, where she was seeded 17th. In the quarterfinals, she was defeated for the third time this year by tenth seed Victoria Azarenka. At her final tournament before the US Open, the Pilot Pen Tennis tournament in New Haven, Bartoli was seeded sixth and defeated Alona Bondarenko and Anastasia Rodionova to reach the quarterfinals, where she lost to fourth seed Elena Dementieva.

At the US Open, Bartoli was seeded 13th and defeated Edina Gallovits in the first round. In the second round, she was upset by world No. 157, Virginie Razzano. At the Osaka Open in Japan, Bartoli was seeded second behind Samantha Stosur. She reached the semifinals by defeating Julie Coin, Stefanie Vögele and Jill Craybas, then lost in the semifinal to Tamarine Tanasugarn. Bartoli ended the year at world No. 16 with a total record of 34–21 and a record of 2–4 against top-10 players.

=== 2011: French Open semifinal and Premier Mandatory final ===
Bartoli kicked off her 2011 season at the Brisbane International. She was seeded fourth and reached the semifinals, where she was defeated by Andrea Petkovic. Bartoli was top seeded at the Hobart International in her first appearance at the tournament. She lost to fifth seed Klára Zakopalová in the quarterfinals.

Bartoli was seeded 15th at the Australian Open, where she defeated Tathiana Garbin in the first round without losing a game. She lost against Vesna Manasieva is the second round, though Bartoli suffered an injury in the first set. At the Qatar Ladies Open in Doha, Bartoli was unseeded but reached the semifinals, where she lost to world No. 1 Caroline Wozniacki. Bartoli was seeded 2nd at the Malaysian Open in Kuala Lumpur, where she reached the quarterfinals and lost to fifth seed Lucie Šafářová. Bartoli was seeded 15th at the Indian Wells Open. She defeated Monica Niculescu, Andrea Petkovic, Kim Clijsters (who retired with an injury), Ana Ivanovic and Yanina Wickmayer to reach the final, where she lost to world No. 1, Caroline Wozniacki. It was Bartoli's first and only final of Premier Mandatory/5 category. As a result of her run to the final, Bartoli returned to the top 10.

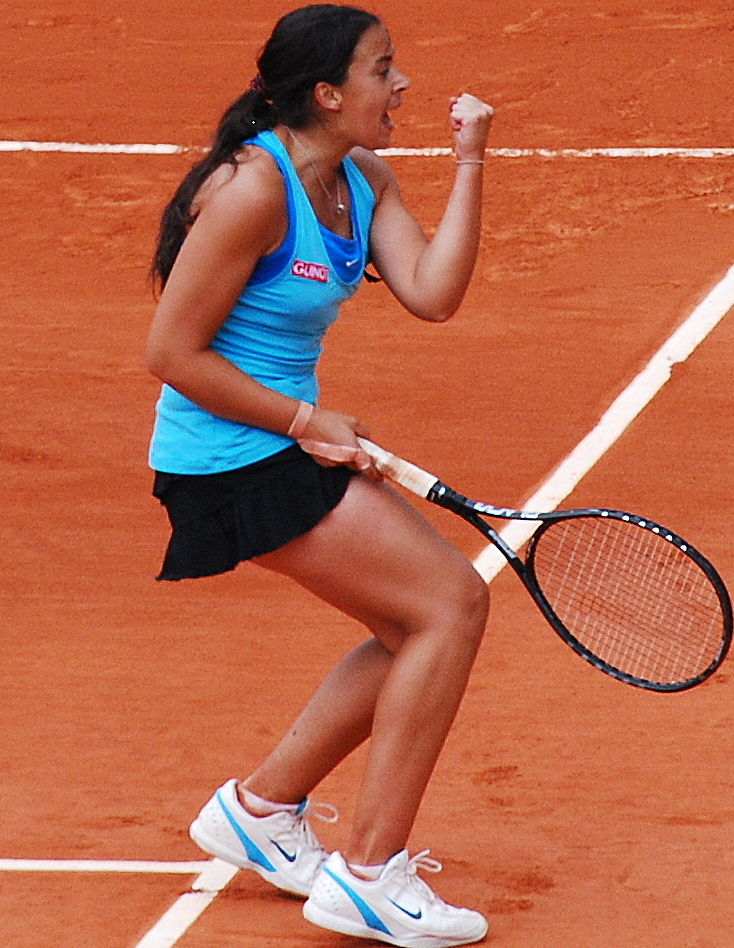
Bartoli at the 2011 French Open where she reached the semifinals

Bartoli was the top seed at the Internationaux de Strasbourg, and reached the final where she faced 2nd seed Andrea Petkovic. However, she had to retire early in the second set. Seeded 11th at the French Open, Bartoli won her opening round against Anna Tatishvili. In the second round she beat Olga Govortsova, then defeated 17th seed Julia Görges in the third. She moved into the quarterfinals after Gisela Dulko retired during their fourth round match. She beat 13th seed Svetlana Kuznetsova in the quarterfinals. In the semifinals she lost to defending champion Francesca Schiavone.

Moving onto the grass, Bartoli won the Eastbourne International by defeating Lucie Šafářová and María José Martínez Sánchez. She then moved past third seed Victoria Azarenka when Azarenka retired during their match due to a thigh injury. Bartoli reached the semifinals for the fifth straight year and beat seventh seed Samantha Stosur. She then beat eighth seed Petra Kvitová to win the title. Bartoli was seeded ninth at Wimbledon. She defeated Czech qualifier Kristýna Plíšková in the first round, Lourdes Domínguez Lino in the second, and 21st seed Flavia Pennetta in the third. She then defeated defending champion and grass-court veteran Serena Williams in the fourth round. Bartoli described beating Williams as the greatest win of her life. In the quarterfinals, Bartoli was defeated by Sabine Lisicki in a match notable for taking place under the centre-court roof in the middle of a thunderstorm.

At Stanford, where Bartoli was seeded third, she reached the final after Ayumi Morita, her opponent in the quarterfinals, retired, and Dominika Cibulková, her opponent in the semifinals, withdrew. In the final, Bartoli was defeated by Serena Williams. Due to her lack of match play before the US Open, Bartoli accepted a wildcard into the New Haven Open at Yale. She won her opening two rounds, defeating Anastasia Rodionova and Klára Zakopalová, before losing to Petra Cetkovská in the quarterfinals. At the US Open, Bartoli suffered a second-round exit. After defeating Alexandra Panova in the first round, she lost to American teenager Christina McHale. Following her poor run in the United States, Bartoli's ranking dropped to No. 10, and her "Race" ranking dropped to No. 8.

Seeded seventh at the Pan Pacific Open in Tokyo, Bartoli reached the quarterfinals, where she was defeated by third seed Victoria Azarenka. At the Osaka Open, Bartoli defeated Melinda Czink, Vania King, sixth seed Ayumi Morita, and third seed Angelique Kerber to reach the final. She took the title by defeating top seed and US Open champion Samantha Stosur. Bartoli finished the year ninth in the race to the Year End Championships in Istanbul, thus earning a place as the first alternate player. Following the withdrawal of second seed Maria Sharapova after her second of three matches, Bartoli took her place in the final match against Victoria Azarenka, which she won. Bartoli finished the year ranked No. 9 in the world with the best win–loss record of her career at 58–24. She reached 15 quarterfinals, eight semifinals, and five finals, and won two titles (Eastbourne and Osaka), resulting in her best year financially, earning $1,722,863 in tournament prize money.

=== 2012: US Open quarterfinal ===
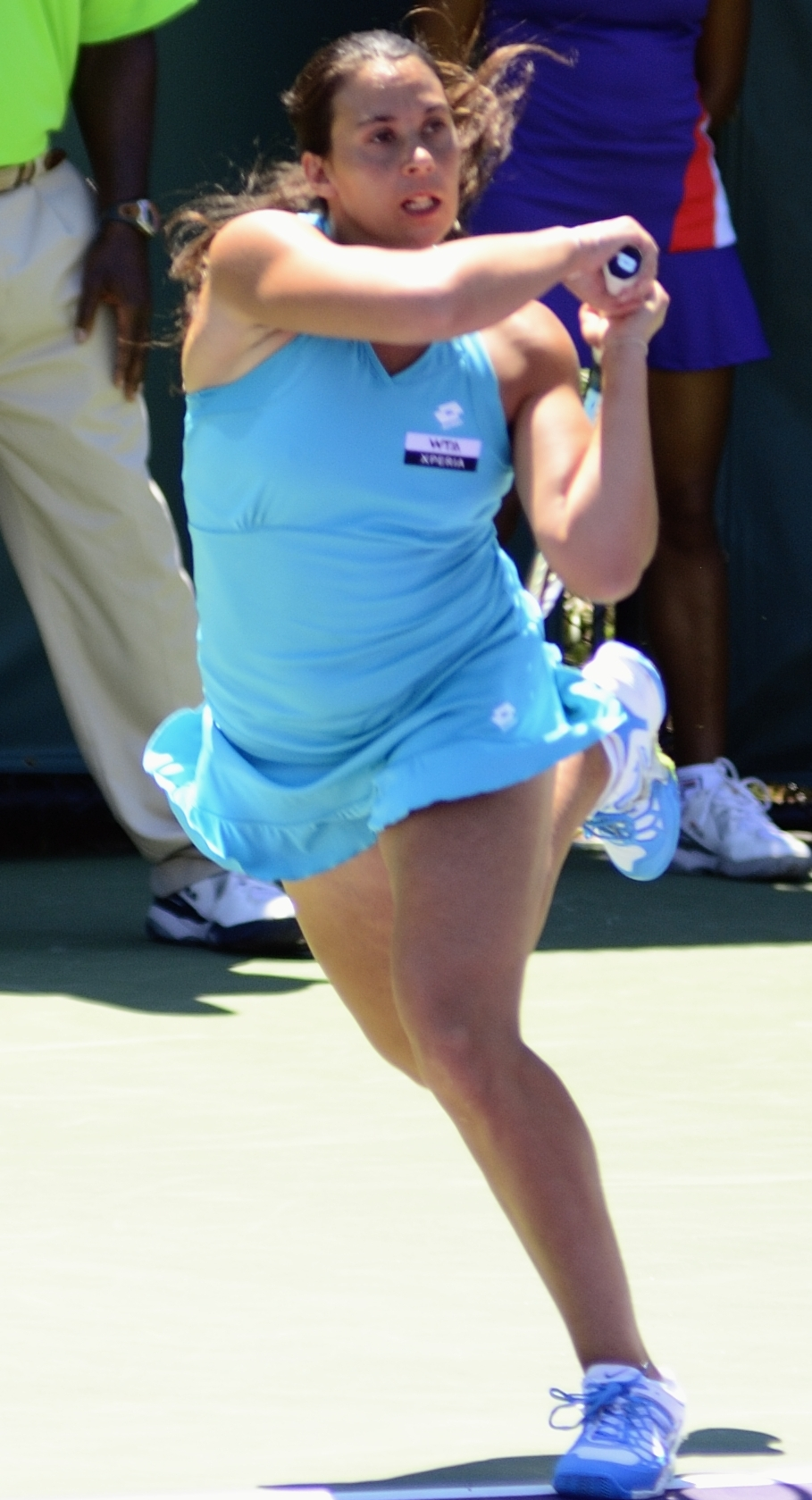
Bartoli at the 2012 Miami Open

Bartoli competed for France alongside Richard Gasquet in the Hopman Cup. They defeated China, Australia, and Spain to book a place against the Czech Republic in the final, which they lost. Bartoli reached the quarterfinals of her first WTA tournament of the year in Sydney and was seeded eighth. In the quarterfinal she was defeated by third seed Victoria Azarenka. At the Australian Open, Bartoli defeated compatriot Virginie Razzano in the first round and Jelena Dokić in the second round. In the third round, she was upset by Zheng Jie. After the tournament Bartoli broke into the top eight in the rankings for the first time. Ranked No. seven, Bartoli was seeded second for the Open GDF Suez in Paris. She received a bye into the second round, then defeated Petra Martić, Roberta Vinci and Klára Zakopalová to reach the final, which she lost to Angelique Kerber.

In Doha, Bartoli was seeded fifth and advanced to the semifinals by defeating Anabel Medina Garrigues, Tsvetana Pironkova, and Lucie Šafářová. She retired due to an injury against third seed Samantha Stosur in the semifinals. At Indian Wells, Bartoli reached the quarterfinals by defeating Varvara Lepchenko, Chanelle Scheepers, and Lucie Šafářová. She fell to Ana Ivanovic. Seeded seventh in Miami, Bartoli defeated Polona Hercog, Simona Halep, Maria Kirilenko and world No. 1, Victoria Azarenka, to reach the semifinals, where she was defeated by fifth seed and eventual champion, Agnieszka Radwańska.

Bartoli was seeded eighth at the French Open, where she was defending semifinal points from the previous year. Bartoli defeated qualifier Karolína Plíšková in the first round, but in the second round was upset by Petra Martić. At Eastbourne, Bartoli defeated Sorana Cîrstea, Aleksandra Wozniak, and Lucie Šafářová to reach the semifinals, where she was defeated by eventual champion Tamira Paszek. In the first round of Wimbledon, Bartoli defeated Casey Dellacqua. Her run ended with a loss to Mirjana Lučić in the second round.

Seeded second at the Stanford Classic in, Bartoli reached the quarterfinals, where she lost to Yanina Wickmayer. At the Carlsbad Open in California, Bartoli was the top-seed. She received a bye into the second round, then defeated Vania King, Christina McHale and Chan Yung-jan to reach the final, which she lost to second seed and close friend Dominika Cibulkova.

Bartoli did not compete in the London Olympics, refusing to play in the Fed Cup without the coaching of her father. At the New Haven Open, Bartoli reached the quarterfinals, where she lost to Sara Errani. Bartoli reached her first US Open quarterfinals in 2012, where she upset fifth seed Petra Kvitová in the fourth round (she was ultimately defeated in the quarterfinals by Maria Sharapova); that performance marked a quarterfinals-or-better finish in all four Grand Slams for Bartoli. Next she reached the semifinals in Beijing, losing to Victoria Azarenka.

=== 2013: Wimbledon title and retirement ===
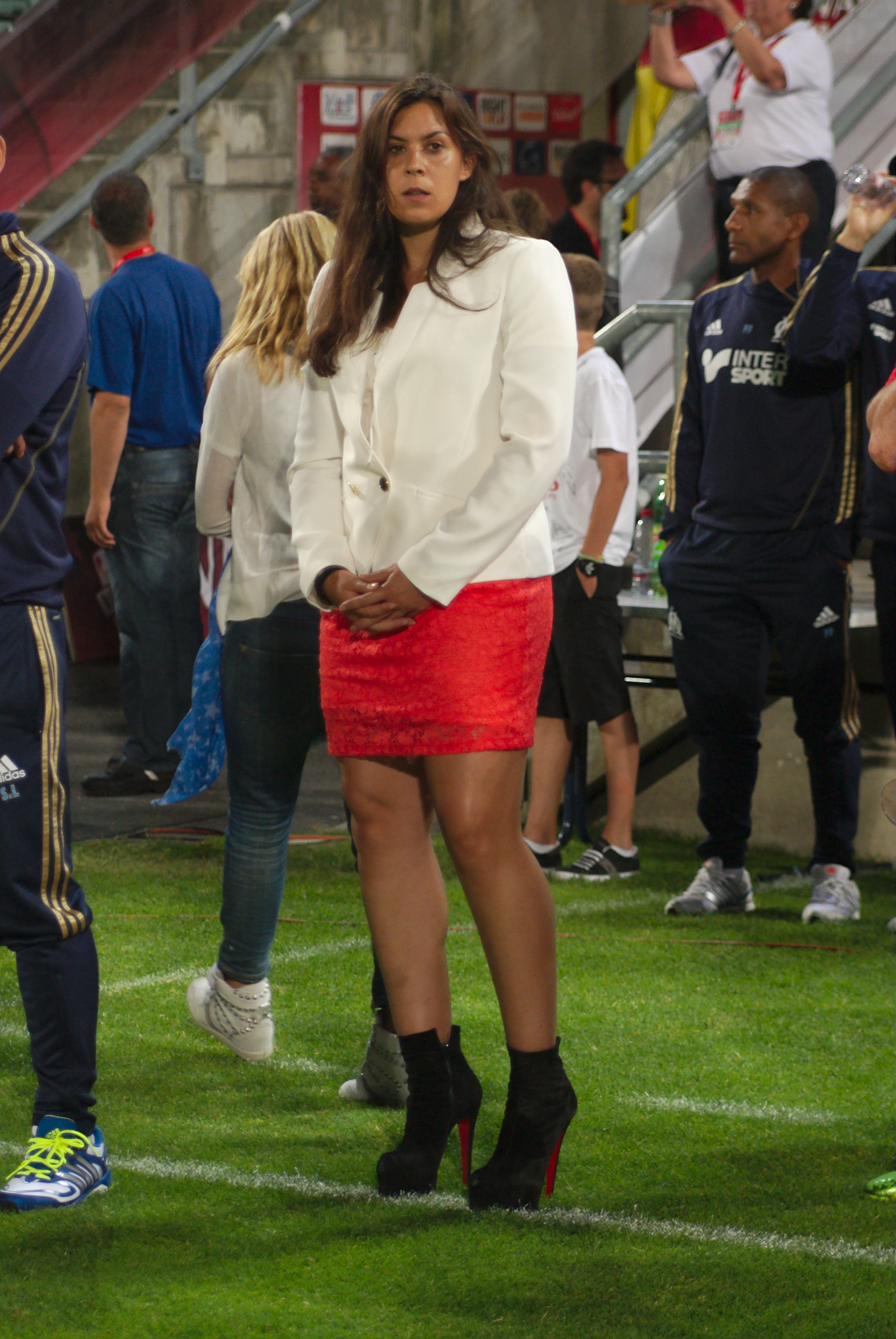
Bartoli at the 2013 Valais Cup

Bartoli started the 2013 season by participating in a new tournament, the Shenzhen Open. She was seeded second and reached the quarterfinals, where she was defeated by fifth seed Klára Zakopalová.

Bartoli was seeded 11th at the Australian Open. She reached the third round, where she was defeated by the 19th seed Ekaterina Makarova. At the Open GdF Suez in Paris, Bartoli reached the quarterfinals, where she was defeated by German and eventual champion Mona Barthel. Bartoli entered her first tournament without her father acting as her coach at the Qatar Total Open, where she was seeded ninth. She lost to Svetlana Kuznetsova in the second round.

At the French Open, Bartoli was seeded 13th and defeated Olga Govortsova in the first round, qualifier Mariana Duque Marino in the second, but lost to Francesca Schiavone in the third.

Seeded No. 15 at Wimbledon, Bartoli defeated Elina Svitolina in the first round, Christina McHale in the second, Camila Giorgi in the third, and Karin Knapp in the fourth. In the quarterfinals, she defeated 17th seed Sloane Stephens, which was her first quarterfinal victory of any WTA Tour or Grand Slam event in 2013. In the semifinals, she beat 20th seed Kirsten Flipkens to reach her second Wimbledon final. In the final, she faced 23rd seed Sabine Lisicki, who had beaten pre-tournament favorite Serena Williams and 2012 finalist, Agnieszka Radwańska, en route to the final. Bartoli won the match in straight sets for her first and only Grand Slam title. She did not drop a set in the entire tournament. She also became the female player who participated in the most Grand Slam tournaments before winning one, as this was her 47th such tournament (breaking the previous perseverance record held by Jana Novotná, at 45). Bartoli also competed in the mixed doubles alongside Nicholas Monroe. They lost in the first round to Santiago González and Natalie Grandin.

Bartoli announced her immediate retirement from tennis during the Western & Southern Open, citing continuous and increasingly unbearable pain from injuries sustained throughout her career. At an emotional press conference, just 40 days after her Wimbledon victory, she said "I made my dream a reality and it will stay forever with me, but now my body just can't cope with everything. "I have pain everywhere after 45 minutes or an hour of play."

In December 2013, Bartoli was chosen as the 2013 RTL Champion of Champions, ahead of Teddy Tamgho and Tony Parker, by RTL (a French commercial radio network). This annual sports award was inaugurated in 2008. The previous winners were Alain Bernard (2008), Sébastien Loeb (2009), Christophe Lemaitre (2010), Teddy Riner (2011) and Yannick Agnel (2012).

Bartoli was chosen as the L'Équipe Champion of Champions (France female category) in December 2013.

In 2014, Bartoli played for the Austin Aces' inaugural season in the World TeamTennis.

In March 2015, she posted a tweet hinting that she was considering a return to professional tennis, and asked her followers for their opinion. Rumours of a possible comeback circulated again in October 2017, after Bartoli was spotted training at the French Tennis Federation but were later denied by the Frenchwoman.

In July 2016, she said that she "feared for her life" due to an unknown virus. However, later in the month, she tweeted a photo after a blood transfusion that indicated recovery was in sight.

=== 2018: Attempted comeback ===
In December 2017, Bartoli announced her return to the professional tour, and she stated she hoped to be back for the Miami Open in March 2018. She also played Tie Break Tens in New York in March 2018, but lost in the first round to Serena Williams.

In June 2018, after numerous delays and setbacks, Bartoli announced she would be unable to continue her comeback plans, as a result of ongoing and continual injuries.

== Coaching career ==
In October 2019, Bartoli began coaching former French Open champion Jeļena Ostapenko at the tournament in Linz. Their partnership immediately bore fruit, as Ostapenko reached two finals in as many weeks, not having reached a tournament final since March 2018, winning the title at Luxembourg the following week. When Bartoli started working with Ostapenko, she was 76th in the WTA rankings, she helped her get back into the top 20. Bartoli now coaches Harriet Dart.

The partnership between Bartoli and Ostapenko was terminated during the suspension of the WTA Tour due to the COVID-19 pandemic, and Bartoli's pregnancy. After giving birth, Bartoli continued to be Ostapenko's part-time coach.

== Playing style ==
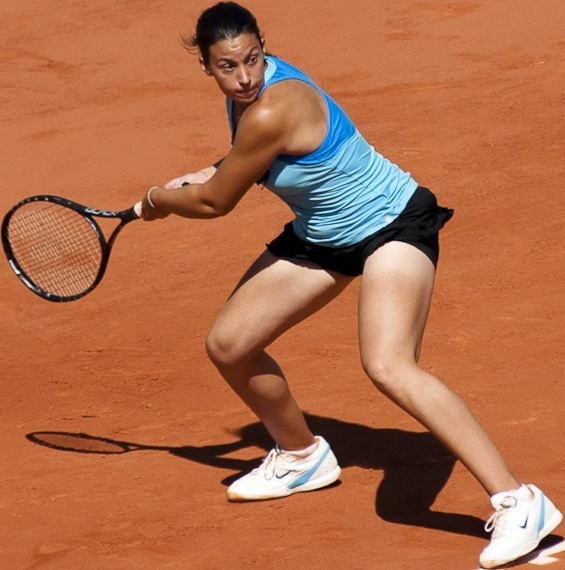
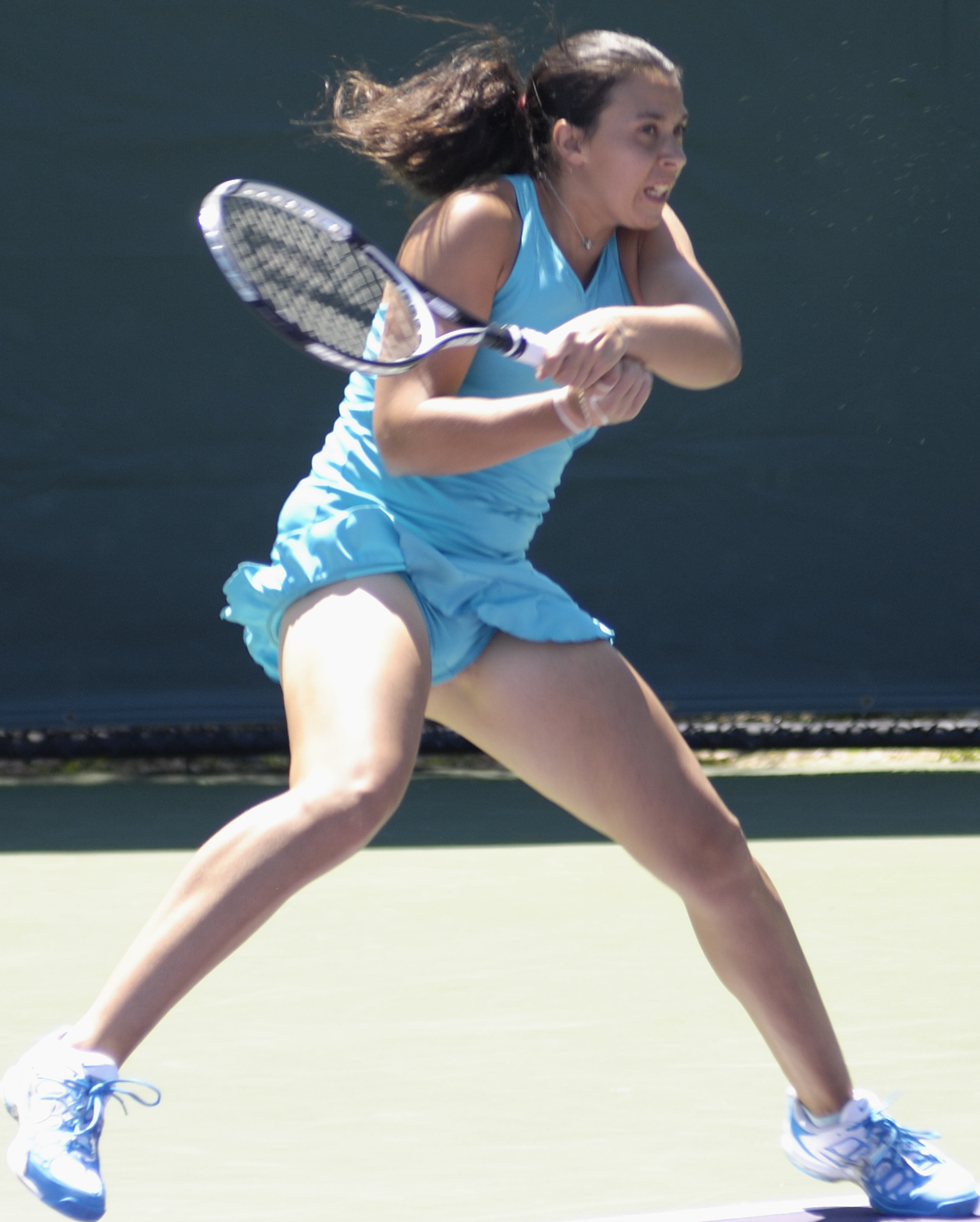
Bartoli is a double-hander in both forehand (left) and backhand (right) sides

Bartoli was known for her unorthodox and intense style of play on the court. She used two hands on both the forehand and the backhand, and was generally classed as an aggressive and hard-hitting player who played primarily from the baseline. She developed her two-handed style on the advice of her father and longtime coach, Walter Bartoli. He had seen the classic 1992 French Open final in which Monica Seles defeated Steffi Graf, and immediately was inspired to teach Seles' technique to his daughter. Bartoli had previously had trouble with her forehand, but it improved significantly when she made the switch to two hands. Her game was based on power and she used her double-fisted strokes to create sharp angles to open up the court and preferred to take the ball very early on groundstrokes.

Her serve was considered a weakness but her return of serve was considered to be her biggest weapon. She often stood well inside the baseline to receive serve, even on first serves, and managed to take advantage of break point opportunities.

Her style of play could be most closely compared to that of Seles, who had a strong influence on Bartoli as a young player. In a TV interview during the 2012 US Open tournament, Bartoli explained that both Seles and she are left-handed, and that she had a weak forehand before changing to two hands.

Bartoli was not a very good mover that covered the court, a state exacerbated by her two-fisted strokes which limited her wingspan and made her vulnerable to fast all-court players such as Agnieszka Radwańska (whom she never beat). Instead, she relied on her rapid response within her reach, excellent hand-eye coordination and anticipation skills. Bartoli did however work on her fitness and mobility throughout her career to varying success.

Bartoli was also known for her destinctive serve, in which she used her wrist to generate speed. She also changed her service motion many times over the years. During the 2013 Wimbledon Championships, she had an unusual setup for serves – no ball-bouncing, arms crossed, right wrist resting on her left thumb before the toss.

Bartoli manifested unusual on-court mannerisms, such as energetically bouncing on the spot and practising racquet swings between points, and being noticeably restless during changeovers. She claimed that this was to maintain the focus needed for her intense style of play.

== Relationship with her father and subsequent coaches ==
Bartoli's father, who had no background in tennis, had years earlier retired from his career as a medical doctor to learn how to become a tennis coach and coach her to become a professional tennis player. Bartoli has denied allegations that her close relationship with her father is a public show to hide a dominating parent. She resisted French Tennis Federation pressure to play without him, including giving up the chance to play at the Olympics in London in 2012 because she would not play in the Fed Cup without his private coaching (which is not a given at team tennis events, where some nations allow it while others including France exercised their right to exclude individual player coaches from accompanying the selected tennis pros). In February 2013, Bartoli announced that the coaching setup with her father had come to an end by mutual agreement, and stated that she would be working with physical trainer Nicolas Perrotte and former player Gabriel Urpí until she found a new coach who could take her to the next level and help her win her first Grand Slam singles title. The following month it was announced on the WTA website that Bartoli was being coached by Jana Novotná, but they cancelled the coaching arrangement after a week with the conclusion of the Indian Wells Open tournament. Bartoli was subsequently coached by former world No. 1, Amélie Mauresmo, under whom she won the 2013 Wimbledon Championships.

== Equipment ==
Bartoli retired whilst using the Prince EXO 3 Warrior racquet. She had previously used the Prince EXO3 Black and the Prince O3 Red. All her Prince racquets were specially modified in New York to make them longer by 2.0 inches (to 29 inches) than standard racquets to give her better reach with her two-handed strokes. She started using the 29-inch frames in 2006 and soon won her first tournament in Auckland. For many years she had no clothing sponsor, but wore Nike. In October 2011, she signed a three-year clothing deal with Lotto. Before her breakthrough into the top 100, Bartoli was playing with a standard length Babolat racquet and she was wearing Le Coq Sportif apparel. Due to her small hands, her racquets had a very small grip size of 0.

== Rivalries ==
=== Bartoli vs. Azarenka ===
Bartoli and Victoria Azarenka met twelve times from 2007 to 2012, with Azarenka winning nine times, including their only Grand Slam meeting.

Bartoli lost the first six meetings between the pair, including the second round of the 2007 Australian Open, the final of the 2009 Brisbane International and all four matches they played against each other in 2010. Bartoli beat Azarenka for the first time at Eastbourne in 2011 when Azarenka retired at 2–6, 0–2 down. At the 2011 WTA Tour Championships, Bartoli qualified as a reserve for Maria Sharapova and in the only match she played, she upset Azarenka in three sets.

The pair met three times in 2012, with Bartoli losing twice. Bartoli's victory in the Miami quarter-finals broke Azarenka's 26-match winning streak to start the season and was her third victory over a reigning world No. 1. Their last meeting was in the semi-finals of the China Open, with Bartoli losing in straight sets to Azarenka, the eventual champion.

=== Bartoli vs. Janković ===
Bartoli and Jelena Janković met nine times between 2005 and 2009. Bartoli won five of these matches and the players were tied 2–2 at Grand Slams.

Bartoli won their first meeting in 2005 at Auckland in three sets. Janković then won their next three meetings, which included wins at the French Open in 2006 and 2007. Bartoli won the next four, including a victory in 2007 at Wimbledon where she went on to reach the final, and a win at the 2009 Australian Open when Janković was ranked world No. 1.

Their last meeting was in 2009 in Tokyo, where Janković won comfortably in two sets.

== Career statistics ==
=== Grand Slam tournament finals ===
==== Singles: 2 (1 title, 1 runner-up) ====
Result	Year	Championship	Surface	Opponent	Score
Loss	2007	Wimbledon	Grass	(United States) Venus Williams	4–6, 1–6
Win	2013	Wimbledon	Grass	(Germany) Sabine Lisicki	6–1, 6–4

=== Grand Slam singles performance timeline ===
Key
W	F	SF	QF	#R	RR	Q#	DNQ	A	NH

(W) winner; (F) finalist; (SF) semifinalist; (QF) quarterfinalist; (#R) rounds 4, 3, 2, 1; (RR) round-robin stage; (Q#) qualification round; (DNQ) did not qualify; (A) absent; (NH) not held; (SR) strike rate (events won / competed); (W–L) win–loss record.

Tournament	2000	2001	2002	2003	2004	2005	2006	2007	2008	2009	2010	2011	2012	2013	SR	W–L
Australian Open	A	A	1R	1R	2R	2R	2R	2R	1R	QF	3R	2R	3R	3R	0 / 12	15–12
French Open	A	1R	1R	2R	1R	1R	2R	4R	1R	2R	3R	SF	2R	3R	0 / 13	16–13
Wimbledon	A	A	A	1R	3R	2R	2R	F	3R	3R	4R	QF	2R	W	1 / 11	29–10
US Open	A	A	3R	1R	2R	3R	3R	4R	4R	2R	2R	2R	QF	A	0 / 11	20–11
Win–loss	0–0	0–1	2–3	1–4	4–4	4–4	5–4	13–4	5–4	8–4	8–4	11–4	8–4	11–2	1 / 47	80–46

== Records ==
Grand Slam tournaments	Time span	Records at each Grand Slam tournament	Players matched
Wimbledon	2013	Win without losing a set	Chris Evert; Martina Navratilova; Lindsay Davenport; Venus Williams; Serena Williams

Time span	Other selected records	Players matched
2011	Played at WTA Tour Championships and WTA Tournament of Champions in the same year	Stands alone

Awards and achievements
Preceded by Camille Muffat	French Sportswoman of the Year; 2013	Succeeded by Pauline Ferrand-Prévot
