= Unstoppable: My Life So Far =

Autobiography of tennis player

Unstoppable. My Life So Far
- First edition
- Author: Maria Sharapova
- Language: English
- Genre: Autobiography
- Publisher: Sarah Crichton Books
- Publication date: September 12, 2017
- Publication place: United States
- Pages: 304
- ISBN: 9780374715311
- OCLC: 1242984600

Unstoppable. My Life So Far is a memoir written by professional tennis player Maria Sharapova and published on September 12, 2017.

== Summary ==
Maria Sharapova is a famous Russian tennis player—a former world number one, Olympic silver medalist, and winner of five Grand Slam tournaments. She started her career at the age of four, and at 17 she made a breakthrough by defeating Serena Williams in the final of the Wimbledon tournament.

Sharapova's candid book about herself, people close to her, victories and failures not only on the court, but also in life. Part of the book is devoted to the 15-month disqualification of the athlete for the unintended use of prohibited substances.

== Reception ==
The book became one of The Boston Globe's Best Books of 2017. In October 2017, the book took second place in The New York Times monthly Sports Bestseller ranking.
