= Flavia Pennetta career statistics =

Career finals
Discipline	Type	Won	Lost	Total	WR (Note: Winning rate)
Singles	Grand Slam	1	0	1	
Singles	WTA Finals (Note: Formerly known as: Virginia Slims Championships (until 1995); WTA Tour Championships (until 2014))	–	–	–	
Singles	WTA Elite (Note: Elite tier: WTA Tournament of Champions (2009–14); WTA Elite Trophy (2015–present))	0	1	1	
Singles	WTA 1000 (Note: Formerly known as: Category 4 & 5 & 6 (until 1990); Tier I (until 2009); WTA Premier Mandatory and 5 (until 2021))	1	0	1	
Singles	WTA 500 (Note: Formerly known as: Category 3 (until 1990); Tier II (until 2009); WTA Premier (until 2021))	1	2	3	
Singles	WTA 250 (Note: Formerly known as: Category 1 & 2 (until 1990); Tier III & IV & V (until 2009); WTA International (until 2021))	8	11	19	
Singles	Olympics	–	–	–	
Singles	Total	11	14	25	
Doubles	Grand Slam	1	2	3	
Doubles	WTA Finals	1	0	1	
Doubles	WTA Elite	–	–	–	
Doubles	WTA 1000	4	6	10	
Doubles	WTA 500	4	2	6	
Doubles	WTA 250	7	7	14	
Doubles	Olympics	–	–	–	
Doubles	Total	17	17	34	

This is a list of the main career statistics of professional Italian tennis player Flavia Pennetta

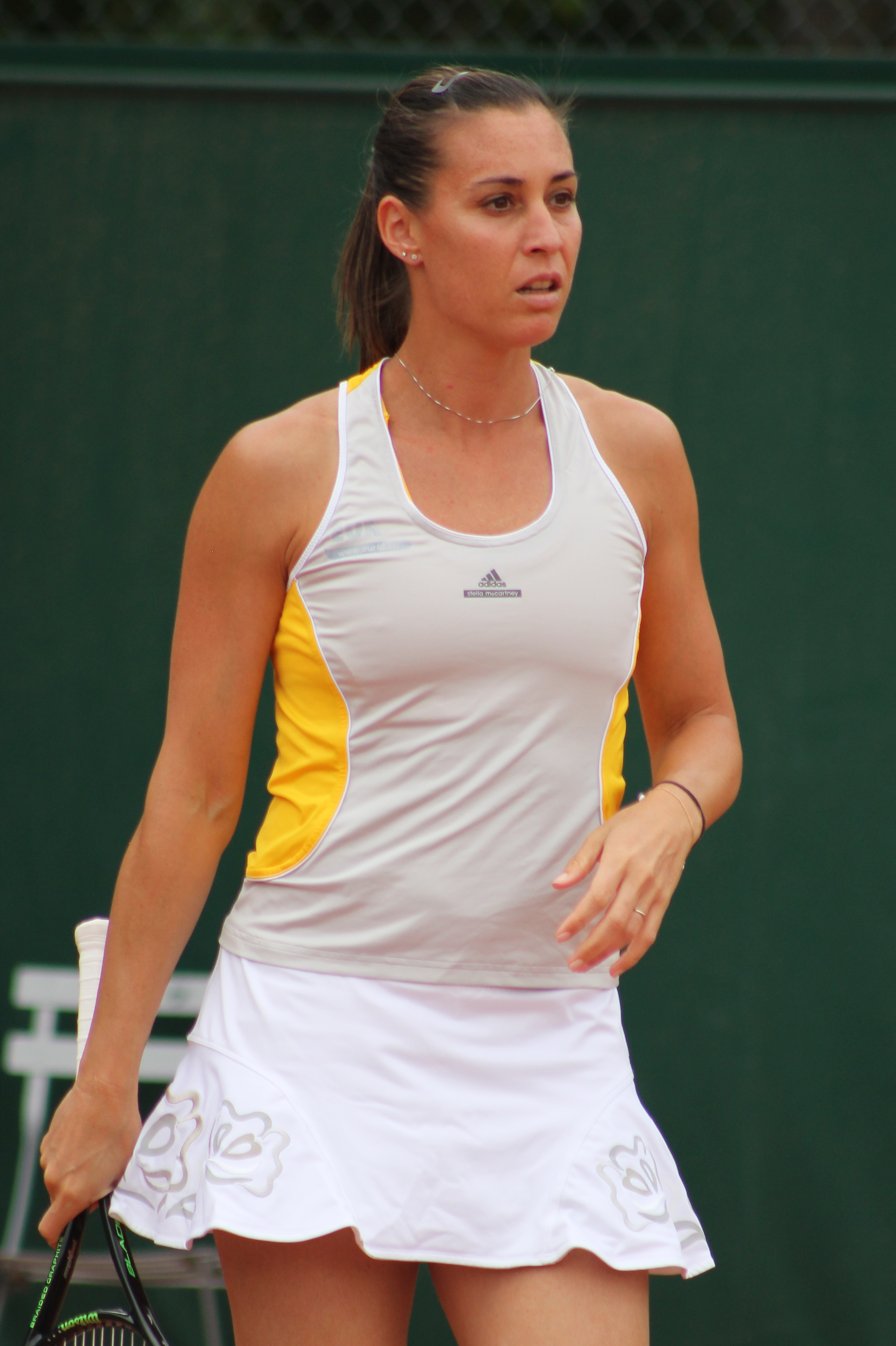
Pennetta at the 2015 French Open

== Performance timelines ==
Key
W	F	SF	QF	#R	RR	Q#	P#	DNQ	A	Z#	PO	G	S	B	NMS	NTI	P	NH

(W) winner; (F) finalist; (SF) semifinalist; (QF) quarterfinalist; (#R) rounds 4, 3, 2, 1; (RR) round-robin stage; (Q#) qualification round; (P#) preliminary round; (DNQ) did not qualify; (A) absent; (Z#) Davis/Fed Cup Zonal Group (with number indication) or (PO) play-off; (G) gold, (S) silver or (B) bronze Olympic/Paralympic medal; (NMS) not a Masters tournament; (NTI) not a Tier I tournament; (P) postponed; (NH) not held; (SR) strike rate (events won / competed); (W–L) win–loss record.
To avoid confusion and double counting, these charts are updated at the conclusion of a tournament or when the player's participation has ended.

Only main-draw results in WTA Tour, Grand Slam tournaments, Billie Jean King Cup (Fed Cup), Hopman Cup and Olympic Games are included in win–loss records.

=== Singles ===
Tournament	1999	2000	2001	2002	2003	2004	2005	2006	2007	2008	2009	2010	2011	2012	2013	2014	2015	SR	W–L	Win%
Grand Slam tournaments
Australian Open	A	A	A	A	1R	1R	1R	3R	1R	2R	3R	2R	4R	1R	A	QF	1R	0 / 12	13–12	52%
French Open	A	A	A	A	3R	1R	3R	3R	1R	4R	1R	4R	1R	3R	1R	2R	4R	0 / 13	18–13	58%
Wimbledon	A	Q2	A	Q2	2R	1R	4R	4R	1R	2R	3R	3R	3R	1R	4R	2R	1R	0 / 13	17–13	57%
US Open	A	A	A	Q1	1R	1R	1R	A	2R	QF	QF	3R	QF	A	SF	QF	W	1 / 11	31–10	76%
Win–loss	0–0	0–0	0–0	0–0	3–4	0–4	5–4	7–3	1–4	9–4	8–4	8–4	9–4	2–3	8–3	10–4	10–3	1 / 49	79–48	62%
National representation
Summer Olympics	NH	A	NH			A	NH			1R	NH			3R	NH			0–2	2–2	50%
Year-end championships
WTA Finals	DNQ																RR	0 / 1	1–2	33%
WTA Elite Trophy	NH										DNQ					F	A	0 / 1	3–2	60%
WTA 1000 + former^{†} tournaments
Dubai / Qatar Open (Note: The first Premier 5 event of the year has switched back and forth between the Dubai Tennis Championships and the Qatar Total Open since 2009. Dubai was classified as a Premier 5 event from 2009 to 2011 before being succeeded by Doha for the 2012–2014 period. In 2015, Dubai regained its Premier 5 status while Doha was demoted to Premier status. The Premier 5 tournaments were reclassified as WTA 1000 tournaments in 2021.)	NH		NMS							A	A	3R	SF	2R	A	1R	QF	0 / 5	10–5	67%
Indian Wells Open	A	A	A	A	2R	2R	2R	3R	2R	3R	4R	3R	3R	3R	1R	W	QF	1 / 13	18–12	60%
Miami Open	A	A	A	A	3R	Q1	3R	A	1R	3R	3R	2R	2R	3R	2R	3R	4R	0 / 11	10–11	48%
Berlin / Madrid Open (Note: In 2009, the Berlin Open was replaced by the Madrid Open. The Premier Mandatory tournaments were reclassified as WTA 1000 tournaments in 2021.)	A	A	A	A	Q1	A	2R	1R	1R	A	1R	2R	1R	A	1R	1R	1R	0 / 9	2–9	18%
Italian Open	Q1	Q2	A	A	2R	3R	2R	QF	1R	2R	3R	2R	1R	QF	1R	3R	1R	0 / 13	16–13	55%
Canadian Open	A	A	A	A	A	A	QF	2R	2R	2R	2R	3R	2R	2R	2R	1R	2R	0 / 11	11–11	50%
Cincinnati Open	NH/NMS										SF	QF	2R	A	1R	3R	2R	0 / 6	11–6	65%
Pan Pacific / Wuhan Open (Note: In 2014, the Toray Pan Pacific Open was downgraded to a Premier event and replaced by the Wuhan Open. The Premier 5 tournaments were reclassified as WTA 1000 tournaments in 2021.)	A	A	A	A	A	A	A	A	A	2R	1R	3R	1R	A	2R	1R	A	0 / 6	4–6	40%
China Open	NMS										3R	1R	SF	A	1R	2R	3R	0 / 6	9–6	60%
Charleston Open^{†}	A	A	A	A	A	A	A	A	1R	A	NMS							0 / 1	0–1	0%
Southern California Open^{†}	A	A	A	A	A	A	2R	3R	A	A	NMS							0 / 2	3–2	60%
Kremlin Cup^{†}	A	A	A	A	A	A	2R	A	A	QF	NMS							0 / 2	3–2	60%
Zurich Open^{†}	A	A	A	A	A	2R	QF	A	A	NMS	NH							0 / 2	3–2	60%
Win–loss	0–0	0–0	0–0	0–0	4–3	4–3	9–8	7–5	1–6	7–6	12–8	12–9	11–9	6–5	3–8	12–8	12–8	1 / 88	100–86	54%
Career statistics
	1999	2000	2001	2002	2003	2004	2005	2006	2007	2008	2009	2010	2011	2012	2013	2014	2015	SR	W–L	Win%
Tournaments	0	0	0	3	20	23	23	18	26	26	25	24	22	14	20	20	20	Career total: 284		
Titles	0	0	0	0	0	1	2	0	1	2	2	1	0	0	0	1	1	Career total: 11		
Finals	0	0	0	0	0	3	2	3	2	4	3	3	0	2	0	2	1	Career total: 25		
Hard win–loss	0–0	0–0	0–0	0–1	11–10	8–11	12–12	12–8	15–12	29–17	32–13	28–13	25–14	8–7	8–9	24–14	22–13	4 / 157	234–154	60%
Clay win–loss	0–0	0–0	0–0	1–2	8–8	20–8	20–6	17–9	14–11	20–5	21–9	19–6	5–5	10–4	8–9	4–4	6–4	7 / 96	173–90	66%
Grass win–loss	0–0	0–0	0–0	0–0	1–2	2–3	3–1	3–2	2–2	1–2	4–2	2–2	3–2	3–3	2–2	2–2	0–2	0 / 27	28–27	51%
Carpet win–loss	0–0	0–0	0–0	0–0	0–0	0–0	2–2	0–1	0–0	0–0	0–0	2–1	0–0	0–0	0–0	0–0	0–0	0 / 4	4–4	50%
Overall win–loss	0–0	0–0	0–0	1–3	18–20	30–22	36–21	29–18	30–25	50–23	52–23	45–22	31–21	21–14	18–20	30–20	28–19	11 / 284	439–275	61%
Year-end ranking		297	292	95	69	38	23	28	40	13	12	24	20	45	31	13	8	$14,197,886		

=== Doubles ===
Tournament	1999	2000	2001	2002	2003	2004	2005	2006	2007	2008	2009	2010	2011	2012	2013	2014	2015	SR	W–L	Win%
Grand Slam tournaments
Australian Open	A	A	A	A	1R	1R	2R	3R	3R	QF	3R	QF	W	3R	A	2R	3R	1 / 12	24–11	69%
French Open	A	A	A	A	1R	A	3R	2R	1R	2R	3R	QF	QF	3R	2R	3R	QF	0 / 12	19–12	61%
Wimbledon	A	Q1	A	A	1R	2R	1R	3R	2R	2R	1R	SF	1R	SF	2R	3R	QF	0 / 13	17–13	57%
US Open	A	A	A	A	1R	3R	F	A	2R	1R	1R	QF	3R	A	3R	F	SF	0 / 11	24–11	69%
Win–loss	0–0	0–0	0–0	0–0	0–4	3–3	7–4	5–3	4–4	5–4	4–3	12–4	11–3	7–3	4–3	10–4	12–4	1 / 48	84–47	64%
National representation
Summer Olympics	NH	A	NH			A	NH			QF	NH			2R	NH			0 / 2	3–2	60%
Year-end championships
WTA Finals (Note: Formerly known as WTA Tour Championships until 2014.)	DNQ											W	SF	DNQ				1 / 2	2–1	67%
WTA 1000 + former^{†} tournaments
Dubai / Qatar Open	NH		NMS							A	A	1R	2R (Note: Withdraw during the tournament. Not counted as a loss.)	1R	A	1R	2R	0 / 5	1–4	20%
Indian Wells Open	A	A	A	A	1R	Q2	2R	2R	1R	2R	SF	2R	2R	1R	1R	2R	1R	0 / 12	9–11	45%
Miami Open	A	A	A	A	A	A	A	A	1R	1R	2R	W	QF	QF	SF	1R	2R	1 / 9	13–8	62%
Madrid Open	A	A	A	A	Q1	A	2R	F	2R	A	1R	F	QF	A	QF	1R	QF	0 / 9	13–9	59%
Italian Open	Q3	QF	A	A	1R	A	1R	A	1R	A	A (Note: Was part of the draw but did not play any match.)	W	QF	QF	1R	2R	QF	1 / 10	12–8	60%
Canadian Open	A	A	A	A	A	A	2R	A	2R	F	A	W	SF	A	1R	QF	QF	1 / 8	15–6	71%
Cincinnati Open	NH/NMS										2R	SF	QF	A	1R	1R	QF	0 / 6	5–6	45%
Pan Pacific / Wuhan Open	A	A	A	A	A	A	A	A	A	QF	QF	QF	F	A	1R	W	A	1 / 6	10–4	71%
China Open	NH	NMS									2R	F	F	A	QF	2R	2R	0 / 6	11–6	65%
Charleston Open^{†}	A	A	A	A	A	A	A	A	SF	A	NMS							0 / 1	2–1	67%
Southern California Open^{†}	A	A	A	A	A	A	1R	1R	A	A	NMS							0 / 2	0–2	0%
Kremlin Cup^{†}	A	A	A	A	A	A	1R	A	A	SF	NMS							0 / 2	2–2	50%
Zurich Open^{†}	A	A	A	A	A	A	QF	A	QF	NH/NMS								0 / 2	2–2	50%
Win-loss	0–0	2–1	0–0	0–0	0–2	0–0	4–7	5–2	5–6	7–4	6–6	24–6	15–8	4–3	6–8	9–8	8–8	4 / 78	95–69	58%
Career statistics
	1999	2000	2001	2002	2003	2004	2005	2006	2007	2008	2009	2010	2011	2012	2013	2014	2015	SR	W–L	Win%
Tournaments	1	4	—N/a	1	14	15	18	13	24	23	19	21	19	13	18	17	15	Career total: 235		
Titles	0	0	0	0	0	0	1	1	0	1	3	7	1	0	1	2	0	Career total: 17		
Finals reached	0	0	0	0	0	0	2	2	2	2	5	9	4	2	2	4	0	Career total: 34		
Hard win–loss	0–0	0–0	0–0	0–0	4–9	6–9	17–9	6–4	9–11	20–13	12–10	30–10	23–11	7–8	11–9	21–10	13–10	10 / 139	179–123	59%
Clay win–loss	1–1	3–3	0–0	1–1	3–4	3–5	4–5	10–3	11–10	9–3	16–6	19–2	5–3	8–2	8–6	3–3	6–3	6 / 71	110–60	65%
Grass win–loss	0–0	0–0	0–0	0–0	0–1	1–1	0–1	4–2	1–1	1–2	4–1	3–2	3–2	6–2	3–2	5–2	4–2	1 / 23	35–21	63%
Carpet win–loss	0–0	0–0	0–0	0–0	0–0	0–0	0–1	2–1	0–0	0–0	0–0	0–0	0–0	0–0	0–0	0–0	0–0	0 / 2	2–2	50%
Overall win–loss	1–1	3–3	—N/a	1–1	7–14	10–15	21–16	22–10	21–22	30–18	32–17	52–14	31–16	21–12	22–17	29–15	23–15	17 / 235	326–206	61%
Year-end ranking	248	171	323	136	111	100	22	32	37	22	29	2	8	30	33	14				

== Grand Slam tournament finals ==
=== Singles: 1 (1 title) ===
Result	Year	Championship	Surface	Opponent	Score
Win	2015	US Open	Hard	(Italy) Roberta Vinci	7–6^{(7–4)}, 6–2

=== Doubles: 3 (1 title, 2 runner-ups) ===
Result	Year	Championship	Surface	Partner	Opponents	Score
Loss	2005	US Open	Hard	(Russia) Elena Dementieva	(United States) Lisa Raymond (Australia) Samantha Stosur	2–6, 7–5, 3–6
Win	2011	Australian Open	Hard	(Argentina) Gisela Dulko	(Belarus) Victoria Azarenka (Russia) Maria Kirilenko	2–6, 7–5, 6–1
Loss	2014	US Open	Hard	(Switzerland) Martina Hingis	(Russia) Ekaterina Makarova (Russia) Elena Vesnina	6–2, 3–6, 2–6

== Other significant finals ==
=== WTA Finals ===
==== Doubles: 1 (1 title) ====
Result	Year	Location	Surface	Partner	Opponents	Score
Win	2010	WTA Finals, Doha	Hard	(Argentina) Gisela Dulko	(Czech Republic) Květa Peschke (Slovenia) Katarina Srebotnik	7–5, 6–4

=== WTA 1000 ===
==== Singles: 1 (1 title) ====
Result	Year	Tournament	Surface	Opponent	Score
Win	2014	Indian Wells Open	Hard	(Poland) Agnieszka Radwańska	6–2, 6–1

==== Doubles: 10 (4 titles, 6 runner-ups) ====
Result	Year	Tournament	Surface	Partner	Opponents	Score
Loss	2006	German Open	Clay	(Russia) Elena Dementieva	(China) Yan Zi; (China) Zheng Jie	2–6, 3–6
Loss	2008	Canadian Masters	Hard	(Russia) Maria Kirilenko	(Zimbabwe) Cara Black; (United States) Liezel Huber	1–6, 1–6
Win	2010	Miami Open	Hard	(Argentina) Gisela Dulko	(Russia) Nadia Petrova; (Australia) Samantha Stosur	6–3, 4–6, [10–7]
Win	2010	Italian Open	Clay	(Argentina) Gisela Dulko	(Spain) Nuria Llagostera Vives; (Spain) María José Martínez Sánchez	6–4, 6–2
Loss	2010	Madrid Open	Clay	(Argentina) Gisela Dulko	(United States) Serena Williams; (United States) Venus Williams	2–6, 5–7
Win	2010	Canadian Masters	Hard	(Argentina) Gisela Dulko	(Czech Republic) Květa Peschke; (Slovenia) Katarina Srebotnik	7–5, 3–6, [12–10]
Loss	2010	China Open	Hard	(Argentina) Gisela Dulko	(Chinese Taipei) Chuang Chia-jung; (Belarus) Olga Govortsova	6–7^{(2–7)}, 6–1, [7–10]
Loss	2011	Pan Pacific Open	Hard	(Argentina) Gisela Dulko	(United States) Liezel Huber (United States) Lisa Raymond	6–7^{(4–7)}, 6–0, [6–10]
Loss	2011	China Open	Hard	(Argentina) Gisela Dulko	(Czech Republic) Květa Peschke (Slovenia) Katarina Srebotnik	3–6, 4–6
Win	2014	Wuhan Open	Hard	(Switzerland) Martina Hingis	(Zimbabwe) Cara Black (France) Caroline Garcia	6–4, 5–7, [12–10]

== WTA Tour finals ==
=== Singles: 25 (11 titles, 14 runner-ups) ===
Legend Grand Slam tournaments (1–0) Elite (0–1) WTA 1000 (Premier M) (1–0) WTA 500 (Tier II / Premier) (1–2) WTA 250 (Tier III / Tier V / International) (8–11)	Finals by surface Hard (4–6) Clay (7–8)

Result	W–L	Date	Tournament	Tier	Surface	Opponent	Score
Loss	0–1	Mar 2004	Mexican Open, Mexico	Tier III	Clay	(Czech Republic) Iveta Benešová	6–7^{(5–7)}, 4–6
Loss	0–2	Jul 2004	Palermo International, Italy	Tier V	Clay	(Spain) Anabel Medina Garrigues	4–6, 4–6
Win	1–2	Aug 2004	Warsaw Open, Poland	Tier III	Clay	(Czech Republic) Klára Koukalová	7–5, 3–6, 6–3
Win	2–2	Feb 2005	Copa Colsanitas, Colombia	Tier III	Clay	(Spain) Lourdes Domínguez Lino	7–6, 6–4
Win	3–2	Feb 2005	Mexican Open, Mexico	Tier III	Clay	(Slovakia) Ľudmila Cervanová	3–6, 7–5, 6–3
Loss	3–3	Jan 2006	Australian Hard Court Championships, Australia	Tier III	Hard	(Czech Republic) Lucie Šafářová	3–6, 6–3, 5–7
Loss	3–4	Feb 2006	Copa Colsanitas, Colombia	Tier III	Clay	(Spain) Lourdes Domínguez Lino	6–7^{(3–7)}, 4–6
Loss	3–5	Mar 2006	Mexican Open, Mexico	Tier III	Clay	(Germany) Anna-Lena Grönefeld	1–6, 6–4, 2–6
Loss	3–6	Mar 2007	Mexican Open, Mexico	Tier III	Clay	(France) Émilie Loit	6–7^{(0–7)}, 4–6
Win	4–6	Oct 2007	Bangkok Open, Thailand	Tier III	Hard	(Chinese Taipei) Chan Yung-jan	6–1, 6–3
Win	5–6	Feb 2008	Cachantún Cup, Chile	Tier III	Clay	(Czech Republic) Klára Zakopalová	6–4, 5–4 ret.
Win	6–6	Mar 2008	Mexican Open, Mexico (2)	Tier III	Clay	(France) Alizé Cornet	6–0, 4–6, 6–1
Loss	6–7	Jul 2008	LA Championships, US	Tier II	Hard	(Russia) Dinara Safina	4–6, 2–6
Loss	6–8	Oct 2008	Zürich Open, Switzerland	Tier II	Hard (i)	(United States) Venus Williams	6–7^{(1–7)}, 2–6
Loss	6–9	Feb 2009	Mexican Open, Mexico	International	Clay	(United States) Venus Williams	1–6, 2–6
Win	7–9	Jul 2009	Palermo International, Italy	International	Clay	(Italy) Sara Errani	6–1, 6–2
Win	8–9	Aug 2009	LA Championships, US	Premier	Hard	(Australia) Samantha Stosur	6–4, 6–3
Loss	8–10	Jan 2010	Auckland Open, New Zealand	International	Hard	(Belgium) Yanina Wickmayer	3–6, 2–6
Win	9–10	Apr 2010	Andalucia Experience, Spain	International	Clay	(Spain) Carla Suárez Navarro	6–2, 4–6, 6–3
Loss	9–11	Jul 2010	Palermo International, Italy	International	Clay	(Estonia) Kaia Kanepi	4–6, 3–6
Loss	9–12	Jan 2012	Auckland Open, New Zealand	International	Hard	(China) Zheng Jie	6–2, 3–6, 0–2 ret.
Loss	9–13	Mar 2012	Mexican Open, Mexico	International	Clay	(Italy) Sara Errani	7–5, 6–7^{(2–7)}, 0–6
Win	10–13	Mar 2014	Indian Wells Open, US	Premier M	Hard	(Poland) Agnieszka Radwańska	6–2, 6–1
Loss	10–14	Nov 2014	WTA Tournament of Champions, Bulgaria	Elite	Hard (i)	(Germany) Andrea Petkovic	6–1, 4–6, 3–6
Win	11–14	Sep 2015	US Open, New York, US	Grand Slam	Hard	(Italy) Roberta Vinci	7–6^{(7–4)}, 6–2

=== Doubles: 34 (17 titles, 17 runner-ups) ===
Legend Grand Slam tournaments (1–2) Finals (1–0) WTA 1000 (Tier I / Premier 5 / Premier M) (4–6) WTA 500 (Tier II / Premier ) (4–2) WTA 250 (Tier III / Tier IV / International) (7–7)	Finals by surface Hard (10–7) Grass (1–2) Clay (6–8) Carpet (0–0)

Result	W–L	Date	Tournament	Tier	Surface	Partner	Opponents	Score
Win	1–0	Aug 2005	LA Championships, US	Tier II	Hard	(Russia) Elena Dementieva	(United States) Angela Haynes; (United States) Bethanie Mattek	6–2, 6–4
Loss	1–1	Sep 2005	US Open, New York, US	Grand Slam	Hard	(Russia) Elena Dementieva	(United States) Lisa Raymond; (Australia) Samantha Stosur	2–6, 7–5, 3–6
Win	2–1	Feb 2006	Copa Colsanitas, Colombia	Tier III	Clay	(Argentina) Gisela Dulko	(Hungary) Ágnes Szávay; (Germany) Jasmin Wöhr	7–6, 6–1
Loss	2–2	May 2006	German Open, Germany	Tier I	Clay	(Russia) Elena Dementieva	(China) Yan Zi; (China) Zheng Jie	2–6, 3–6
Loss	2–3	Feb 2007	Copa Colsanitas, Colombia	Tier III	Clay	(Italy) Roberta Vinci	(Spain) Lourdes Domínguez Lino; (Argentina) Paola Suárez	6–1, 3–6, [9–11]
Loss	2–4	Jun 2007	Barcelona Open, Spain	Tier IV	Clay	(Spain) Lourdes Domínguez Lino	(Spain) Arantxa Parra Santonja; (Spain) Nuria Llagostera Vives	7–6^{(7–3)}, 2–6, [12–10]
Win	3–4	Apr 2008	Estoril Open, Portugal	Tier IV	Clay	(Russia) Maria Kirilenko	(Bosnia and Herzegovina) Mervana Jugić-Salkić (Turkey) İpek Şenoğlu	6–4, 6–4
Loss	3–5	Jul 2008	Canadian Open (Montréal), Canada	Tier I	Hard	(Russia) Maria Kirilenko	(Zimbabwe) Cara Black; (United States) Liezel Huber	1–6, 1–6
Win	4–5	Jan 2009	Hobart International, Australia	International	Hard	(Argentina) Gisela Dulko	(Ukraine) Alona Bondarenko; (Ukraine) Kateryna Bondarenko	6–2, 7–6^{(7–4)}
Loss	4–6	Feb 2009	Copa Colsanitas, Colombia	International	Clay	(Argentina) Gisela Dulko	(Spain) Nuria Llagostera Vives (Spain) María José Martínez Sánchez	5–7, 6–3, [7–10]
Loss	4–7	May 2009	Stuttgart Open, Germany	Premier	Clay (i)	(Argentina) Gisela Dulko	(United States) Bethanie Mattek-Sands (Russia) Nadia Petrova	7–5, 3–6, [7–10]
Win	5–7	Jun 2009	Rosmalen Championships, Netherlands	International	Grass	(Italy) Sara Errani	(Netherlands) Michaëlla Krajicek; (Belgium) Yanina Wickmayer	6–4, 5–7, [13–11]
Win	6–7	Jul 2009	Swedish Open, Sweden	International	Clay	(Argentina) Gisela Dulko	(Spain) Nuria Llagostera Vives (Spain) María José Martínez Sánchez	6–2, 0–6, [10–5]
Win	7–7	Apr 2010	Miami Open, US	Premier M	Hard	(Argentina) Gisela Dulko	(Russia) Nadia Petrova (Australia) Samantha Stosur	6–3, 4–6, [10–7]
Win	8–7	May 2010	Stuttgart Open, Germany	Premier	Clay	(Argentina) Gisela Dulko	(Czech Republic) Květa Peschke; (Slovenia) Katarina Srebotnik	3–6, 7–6^{(7–3)}, [10–5]
Win	9–7	May 2010	Italian Open, Italy	Premier 5	Clay	(Argentina) Gisela Dulko	(Spain) Nuria Llagostera Vives (Spain) María José Martínez Sánchez	6–4, 6–2
Loss	9–8	May 2010	Madrid Open, Spain	Premier M	Clay	(Argentina) Gisela Dulko	(United States) Serena Williams; (United States) Venus Williams	2–6, 5–7
Win	10–8	Jul 2010	Swedish Open, Sweden (2)	International	Clay	(Argentina) Gisela Dulko	(Czech Republic) Renata Voráčová; (Czech Republic) Barbora Záhlavová-Strýcová	7–6^{(7–0)}, 6–0
Win	11–8	Aug 2010	Canadian Open (Montréal), Canada	Premier 5	Hard	(Argentina) Gisela Dulko	(Czech Republic) Květa Peschke (Slovenia) Katarina Srebotnik	7–5, 3–6, [12–10]
Loss	11–9	Oct 2010	China Open, Beijing, China	Premier M	Hard	(Argentina) Gisela Dulko	(Chinese Taipei) Chuang Chia-jung; (Belarus) Olga Govortsova	6–7^{(2–7)}, 6–1, [7–10]
Win	12–9	Oct 2010	Kremlin Cup, Russia	Premier	Hard (i)	(Argentina) Gisela Dulko	(Italy) Sara Errani (Spain) María José Martínez Sánchez	6–3, 2–6, [10–6]
Win	13–9	Oct 2010	WTA Tour Championships, Qatar	Finals	Hard	(Argentina) Gisela Dulko	(Czech Republic) Květa Peschke (Slovenia) Katarina Srebotnik	7–5, 6–4
Win	14–9	Jan 2011	Australian Open, Melbourne, Australia	Grand Slam	Hard	(Argentina) Gisela Dulko	(Belarus) Victoria Azarenka (Russia) Maria Kirilenko	2–6, 7–5, 6–1
Loss	14–10	Jun 2011	Rosmalen Championships, Netherlands	International	Grass	(Slovakia) Dominika Cibulková	(Czech Republic) Barbora Záhlavová-Strýcová (Czech Republic) Klára Zakopalová	6–1, 4–6, [7–10]
Loss	14–11	Oct 2011	Pan Pacific Open, Japan	Premier 5	Hard	(Argentina) Gisela Dulko	(United States) Liezel Huber (United States) Lisa Raymond	6–7^{(4–7)}, 6–0, [6–10]
Loss	14–12	Oct 2011	China Open, China	Premier M	Hard	(Argentina) Gisela Dulko	(Czech Republic) Květa Peschke (Slovenia) Katarina Srebotnik	3–6, 4–6
Loss	14–13	Jan 2012	Auckland Open, New Zealand	International	Hard	(Germany) Julia Görges	(Czech Republic) Andrea Hlaváčková; (Czech Republic) Lucie Hradecká	7–6^{(7–2)}, 2–6, [7–10]
Loss	14–14	Apr 2012	Barcelona Open, Spain	International	Clay	(Italy) Francesca Schiavone	(Italy) Sara Errani (Italy) Roberta Vinci	0–6, 2–6
Loss	14–15	Jul 2013	Swedish Open, Sweden	International	Clay	(Romania) Alexandra Dulgheru	(Spain) Anabel Medina Garrigues (Czech Republic) Klára Zakopalová	1–6, 4–6
Win	15–15	Oct 2013	Japan Women's Open, Japan	International	Hard	(France) Kristina Mladenovic	(Australia) Samantha Stosur (China) Zhang Shuai	6–4, 6–3
Loss	15–16	Jun 2014	Eastbourne International, UK	Premier	Grass	(Switzerland) Martina Hingis	(Chinese Taipei) Chan Hao-ching; (Chinese Taipei) Chan Yung-jan	3–6, 7–5, [7–10]
Loss	15–17	Sep 2014	US Open, New York, US	Grand Slam	Hard	(Switzerland) Martina Hingis	(Russia) Ekaterina Makarova; (Russia) Elena Vesnina	6–2, 3–6, 2–6
Win	16–17	Sep 2014	Wuhan Open, China	Premier 5	Hard	(Switzerland) Martina Hingis	(Zimbabwe) Cara Black (France) Caroline Garcia	6–4, 5–7, [12–10]
Win	17–17	Oct 2014	Kremlin Cup, Russia	Premier	Hard (i)	(Switzerland) Martina Hingis	(France) Caroline Garcia (Spain) Arantxa Parra Santonja	6–3, 7–5

== ITF Circuit finals ==
=== Singles: 10 (7 titles, 3 runner-ups) ===
Legend
$50,000 tournaments
$25,000 tournaments
$10,000 tournaments

Result	W–L	Date	Tournament	Tier	Surface	Opponent	Score
Win	1–0	Mar 1999	ITF Cagliari, Italy	10,000	Clay	(Slovakia) Andrea Masaryková	7–5, 7–5
Win	2–0	Jun 1999	ITF Grado, Italy	25,000	Clay	(Slovakia) Martina Suchá	1–6, 6–4, 7–5
Loss	2–1	Aug 1999	ITF Alghero, Italy	10,000	Clay	(Spain) Paula Hermida	1–6, 4–6
Loss	2–2	Jul 2001	ITF Alghero, Italy	25,000	Clay	(Hungary) Adrienn Hegedűs	4–6, 4–6
Win	3–2	Feb 2002	ITF Urtijëi, Italy	50,000	Carpet	(Germany) Angelika Bachmann	7–6, 3–6, 6–3
Win	4–2	Mar 2002	ITF Rome, Italy	10,000	Clay	(Ukraine) Oleksandra Kravets	6–4, 6–0
Loss	4–3	Jul 2001	Seoul, South Korea	25,000	Clay	(South Korea) Jeon Mi-ra	6–4, 4–6, 1–6
Win	5–3	Sep 2002	ITF Fano, Italy	50,000	Clay	(Italy) Mara Santangelo	3–6, 6–4, 6–0
Win	6–3	Sep 2002	ITF Biella, Italy	50,000	Clay	(Czech Republic) Sandra Kleinová	6–3, 6–2
Win	7–3	Jul 2004	ITF Cuneo, Italy	50,000	Clay	(Italy) Alice Canepa	6–4, 6–1

=== Doubles: 15 (9 titles, 6 runner-ups) ===
Legend
$75,000 tournaments
$50,000 tournaments
$25,000 tournaments
$10,000 tournaments

Result	W–L	Date	Tournament	Tier	Surface	Partner	Opponents	Score
Loss	0–1	Jul 1997	ITF Civitanova, Italy	10,000	Clay	(Italy) Roberta Lamagni	(Croatia) Marijana Kovačević (Croatia) Kristina Pojatina	4–6, 1–6
Win	1–1	Apr 1998	ITF Brindisi, Italy	10,000	Clay	(Italy) Roberta Vinci	(Slovakia) Alena Paulenková (Slovakia) Gabriela Voleková	6–4, 7–6
Win	1–2	May 1998	ITF Quartu Sant'Elena, Italy	10,000	Grass	(Italy) Roberta Vinci	(Colombia) Giana Gutiérrez (Lithuania) Galina Misiuriova	6–3, 6–0
Win	2–2	Mar 1999	ITF Cagliari, Italy	10,000	Clay	(Italy) Roberta Vinci	(United States) Dawn Buth (United States) Rebecca Jensen	6–3, 4–6, 6–3
Loss	2–3	Jun 1999	ITF Grado, Italy	25,000	Clay	(United States) Tracy Almeda-Singian	(France) Lea Ghirardi (France) Noëlle van Lottum	6–1, 4–6, 4–6
Win	3–3	Aug 1999	ITF Alghero, Italy	10,000	Carpet	(Italy) Roberta Vinci	(Italy) Sabina Da Ponte (Italy) Valentina Sassi	6–2, 6–1
Loss	3–4	Sep 1999	ITF Lecce, İtaly	10,000	Clay	(Italy) Roberta Vinci	(Argentina) Erica Krauth (Argentina) Vanesa Krauth	6–1, 6–7^{(5)}, 1–6
Loss	3–5	Oct 2001	ITF Joué-lès-Tours, France	25,000	Hard (i)	(Italy) Maria Paola Zavagli	(Madagascar) Dally Randriantefy (Madagascar) Natacha Randriantefy	4–6, 6–3, 3–6
Win	4–5	Mar 2002	ITF Rome, Italy	10,000	Clay	(Italy) Claudia Ivone	(Germany) Caroline Ann Basu (Estonia) Margit Rüütel	6–3, 6–4
Win	5–5	Aug 2002	ITF Brindisi, Italy	25,000	Clay	(Romania) Andreea Vanc	(Slovakia) Ľubomíra Kurhajcová (Slovakia) Lenka Němcová	6–3, 6–2
Win	6–5	Aug 2002	ITF Bronx, United States	50,000	Hard	(Estonia) Maret Ani	(Japan) Shinobu Asagoe (Japan) Nana Miyagi	6–4, 6–1
Win	7–5	Sep 2002	ITF Fano, Italy	50,000	Clay	(Romania) Andreea Vanc	(Russia) Gulnara Fattakhetdinova (Belarus) Darya Kustova	7–5, 6–3
Win	8–5	Sep 2002	ITF Bordeaux, France	75,000	Clay	(Romania) Andreea Vanc	(Australia) Sarah Stone (Australia) Samantha Stosur	6–3, 7–5
Loss	8–6	Oct 2002	ITF Girona, Spain	50,000	Clay	(Romania) Andreea Vanc	(Bulgaria) Lubomira Bacheva (Spain) Gala León García	4–6, 3–6
Loss	8–7	Oct 2003	ITF Dubai, United Arab Emirates	75,000	Hard	(Italy) Adriana Serra Zanetti	(Hungary) Zsófia Gubacsi (Hungary) Kira Nagy	6–2, 2–6, 2–6

== Record against top 10 players ==
=== No. 1 wins ===
#	Player	Event	Surface	Round	Score	Outcome
1	(Serbia) Jelena Janković	2008 Zürich Open	Hard (i)	2R	5–7, 6–3, 6–3	Finalist
2	(Denmark) Caroline Wozniacki	2011 China Open	Hard	QF	3–6, 6–0, 7–6^{(7–2)}	Semifinalist

=== Top 10 wins ===
Season	2004	2005	2006	2007	2008	2009	2010	2011	2012	2013	2014	2015	Total
Wins	1	1	0	1	3	5	2	5	0	1	4	5	28

#	Player	vsRank	Event	Surface	Round	Score
2004
1.	(Russia) Nadia Petrova	6	Italian Open	Clay	2R	1–6, 7–6^{(7–4)}, 6–4
2005
2.	(Belgium) Justine Henin	5	Stuttgart Open, Germany	Hard (i)	2R	6–4, 6–3
2007
3.	(United States) Venus Williams	8	Bangkok Open, Thailand	Hard (i)	SF	6–4, 7–6^{(10–8)}
2008
4.	(United States) Venus Williams	8	French Open	Clay	3R	7–5, 6–3
5.	(United States) Venus Williams	8	Kremlin Cup, Russia	Hard (i)	1R	6–4, 2–6, 6–4
6.	(Serbia) Jelena Janković	1	Zurich Open, Switzerland	Hard (i)	2R	5–7, 6–3, 6–3
2009
7.	(Russia) Nadia Petrova	10	Stuttgart Open, Germany	Clay (i)	2R	6–2, 6–2
8.	(Serbia) Jelena Janković	4	Stuttgart Open, Germany	Clay (i)	QF	2–6, 6–4, 6–4
9.	(Russia) Vera Zvonareva	7	LA Championships, U.S.	Hard	QF	6–4, 6–2
10.	(United States) Venus Williams	3	Cincinnati Open, U.S.	Hard	3R	7–6^{(7–2)}, 6–4
11.	(Russia) Vera Zvonareva	7	US Open	Hard	4R	3–6, 7–6^{(7–2)}, 6–0
2010
12.	(Australia) Samantha Stosur	5	San Diego Open, U.S.	Hard	QF	6–4, 6–3
13.	(Russia) Vera Zvonareva	10	Cincinnati Open, U.S.	Hard	3R	6–4, 6–3
2011
14.	(Russia) Vera Zvonareva	2	Sydney International, Australia	Hard	2R	7–5, 7–5
15.	(Australia) Samantha Stosur	5	Fed Cup, Hobart	Hard	QF	7–6^{(7–5)}, 6–7^{(5–7)}, 6–4
16.	(Belarus) Victoria Azarenka	7	Dubai Championships, UAE	Hard	3R	6–3, 6–7^{(2–7)}, 6–4
17.	(Russia) Maria Sharapova	3	US Open	Hard	3R	6–3, 3–6, 6–4
18.	(Denmark) Caroline Wozniacki	1	China Open	Hard	QF	3–6, 6–0, 7–6^{(7–2)}
2013
19.	(Italy) Sara Errani	5	US Open	Hard	2R	6–3, 6–1
2014
20.	(Germany) Angelique Kerber	9	Australian Open	Hard	4R	6–1, 4–6, 7–5
21.	(Poland) Agnieszka Radwańska	4	Dubai Championships, UAE	Hard	2R	6–4, 6–1
22.	(China) Li Na	2	Indian Wells Open, U.S.	Hard	SF	7–6^{(7–5)}, 6–3
23.	(Poland) Agnieszka Radwańska	3	Indian Wells Open, U.S.	Hard	F	6–2, 6–1
2015
24.	(Russia) Maria Sharapova	2	Indian Wells Open, U.S.	Hard	4R	3–6, 6–3, 6–2
25.	(Spain) Carla Suárez Navarro	8	French Open	Clay	3R	6–3, 6–4
26.	(Czech Republic) Petra Kvitová	4	US Open	Hard	QF	4–6, 6–4, 6–2
27.	(Romania) Simona Halep	2	US Open	Hard	SF	6–1, 6–3
28.	(Poland) Agnieszka Radwańska	6	WTA Finals, Singapore	Hard (i)	RR	7–6^{(7–5)}, 6–4
