= 2011 Sony Ericsson Open – Women's singles =

Women's singles
- 2011 Sony Ericsson Open

Final
- Champion: (Belarus) Victoria Azarenka
- Runner-up: (Russia) Maria Sharapova
- Score: 6–1, 6–4

Details
- Draw: 96
- Seeds: 32

Events
Singles	men	women
Doubles	men	women
← 2010 ·	Sony Ericsson Open	· 2012 →

Victoria Azarenka defeated Maria Sharapova in the final, 6–1, 6–4 to win the women's singles tennis title at the 2011 Miami Open. It was her second Miami Open title.

Kim Clijsters was the defending champion, but lost to Victoria Azarenka in the quarterfinals in a rematch of the previous year's fourth-round match.

== Seeds ==
All seeds received a bye into the second round.

1. (Denmark) Caroline Wozniacki (fourth round)
2. (Belgium) Kim Clijsters (quarterfinals)
3. (Russia) Vera Zvonareva (semifinals)
4. (Australia) Samantha Stosur (fourth round)
5. (Italy) Francesca Schiavone (fourth round)
6. (Serbia) Jelena Janković (quarterfinals)
7. (China) Li Na (second round)
8. (Belarus) Victoria Azarenka (champion)
9. (Poland) Agnieszka Radwańska (quarterfinals)
10. (Israel) Shahar Pe'er (second round)
11. (Russia) Svetlana Kuznetsova (third round)
12. (Czech Republic) Petra Kvitová (third round)
13. (Italy) Flavia Pennetta (second round)
14. (Estonia) Kaia Kanepi (second round)
15. (France) Marion Bartoli (fourth round)
16. (Russia) Maria Sharapova (final)
17. (Russia) Anastasia Pavlyuchenkova (fourth round)
18. (Russia) Nadia Petrova (second round, retired due to injury)
19. (Serbia) Ana Ivanovic (fourth round)
20. (France) Aravane Rezaï (second round)
21. (Germany) Andrea Petkovic (semifinals)
22. (Russia) Alisa Kleybanova (second round)
23. (Belgium) Yanina Wickmayer (second round)
24. (Russia) Maria Kirilenko (third round)
25. (Slovakia) Dominika Cibulková (third round)
26. (Romania) Alexandra Dulgheru (quarterfinals)
27. (Spain) María José Martínez Sánchez (third round)
28. (Australia) Jarmila Groth (third round)
29. (Slovakia) Daniela Hantuchová (third round)
30. (Czech Republic) Lucie Šafářová (third round)
31. (Bulgaria) Tsvetana Pironkova (second round)
32. (Czech Republic) Klára Zakopalová (third round)

== Draw ==
=== Key ===
- Q = Qualifier
- WC = Wild card
- LL = Lucky loser
- Alt = Alternate
- SE = Special exempt
- PR = Protected ranking
- ITF = ITF entry
- JE = Junior exempt
- w/o = Walkover
- r = Retired
- d = Defaulted
- SR = Special ranking

=== Finals ===
Quarterfinals
21	(Germany) Andrea Petkovic	2	6	6
6	(Serbia) Jelena Janković	6	2	4
16	(Russia) Maria Sharapova	3	7^{8}	7^{7}
26	(Romania) Alexandra Dulgheru	6	6^{6}	6^{5}
9	(Poland) Agnieszka Radwańska	5	3
3	(Russia) Vera Zvonareva	7	6
8	(Belarus) Victoria Azarenka	6	6
2	(Belgium) Kim Clijsters	3	3

Semifinals
21	(Germany) Andrea Petkovic	6	0	2
16	(Russia) Maria Sharapova	3	6	6
3	(Russia) Vera Zvonareva	0	3
8	(Belarus) Victoria Azarenka	6	6

Final
16	(Russia) Maria Sharapova	1	4
8	(Belarus) Victoria Azarenka	6	6

=== Top half ===
==== Section 1 ====
First round
(Sweden) S Arvidsson	1	4
(United States) B Mattek-Sands	6	6
(Germany) J Görges	5	3
(United States) M Oudin	7	6
WC	(Croatia) A Tomljanović	6	5	0
Q	(United States) J Hampton	3	7	6
(Italy) R Vinci	5	4
(Czech Republic) I Benešová	7	6

Second round
1	(Denmark) C Wozniacki	6	7
(United States) B Mattek-Sands	2	5
(United States) M Oudin	1	3
29	(Slovakia) D Hantuchová	6	6
21	(Germany) A Petkovic	6	7
Q	(United States) J Hampton	2	5
(Czech Republic) I Benešová	6	6
13	(Italy) F Pennetta	3	0

Third round
1	(Denmark) C Wozniacki	6	7
29	(Slovakia) D Hantuchová	1	6^{7}
21	(Germany) A Petkovic	6	6
(Czech Republic) I Benešová	0	3

Fourth round
1	(Denmark) C Wozniacki	5	6	3
21	(Germany) A Petkovic	7	3	6

==== Section 2 ====
First round
Q	(Russia) K Pervak	1	2
(Spain) A Medina Garrigues	6	6
(Argentina) G Dulko	1	3
(Russia) E Vesnina	6	6
(United Kingdom) E Baltacha	3	7	7
(Austria) S Bammer	6	6^{5}	6^{5}
(Serbia) B Jovanovski	1	6^{2}
(Romania) M Niculescu	6	7

Second round
10	(Israel) S Pe'er	2	2
(Spain) A Medina Garrigues	6	6
(Russia) E Vesnina	6	5	6
23	(Belgium) Y Wickmayer	2	7	4
32	(Czech Republic) K Zakopalová	7	6
(United Kingdom) E Baltacha	6^{4}	3
(Romania) M Niculescu	3	1
6	(Serbia) J Janković	6	6

Third round
(Spain) A Medina Garrigues	6	6
(Russia) E Vesnina	3	4
32	(Czech Republic) K Zakopalová	5	1
6	(Serbia) J Janković	7	6

Fourth round
(Spain) A Medina Garrigues	1	3
6	(Serbia) J Janković	6	6

==== Section 3 ====
First round
WC	(Romania) S Cîrstea	3	7	3
(China) J Zheng	6	6^{5}	6
(Switzerland) P Schnyder	3	6	7
WC	(United States) M Keys	6	1	6^{2}
WC	(Germany) S Lisicki	6	5	6
PR	(Hungary) M Czink	3	7	4
(Germany) K Barrois	5	2
WC	(Croatia) P Martić	7	6

Second round
4	(Australia) S Stosur	6	6
(China) J Zheng	2	1
(Switzerland) P Schnyder	2	4
30	(Czech Republic) L Šafářová	6	6
18	(Russia) N Petrova	6	3	1^{r}
WC	(Germany) S Lisicki	4	6	3
WC	(Croatia) P Martić	3	2
16	(Russia) M Sharapova	6	6

Third round
4	(Australia) S Stosur	6	7
30	(Czech Republic) L Šafářová	0	6^{1}
WC	(Germany) S Lisicki	2	0
16	(Russia) M Sharapova	6	6

Fourth round
4	(Australia) S Stosur	4	1
16	(Russia) M Sharapova	6	6

==== Section 4 ====
First round
PR	(Poland) U Radwańska	3	2
(Romania) S Halep	6	6
(Hungary) G Arn	1	2
(China) S Peng	6	6
(Slovenia) P Hercog	7	5	2
(South Africa) C Scheepers	5	7	6
(Sweden) J Larsson	6	7
(Australia) A Rodionova	4	6^{3}

Second round
11	(Russia) S Kuznetsova	6	6
(Romania) S Halep	0	4
(China) S Peng	6	6
20	(France) A Rezaï	0	4
26	(Romania) A Dulgheru	6	6
(South Africa) C Scheepers	3	2
(Sweden) J Larsson	7	6^{5}	7
7	(China) N Li	5	7	6^{5}

Third round
11	(Russia) S Kuznetsova	3	1
(China) S Peng	6	6
26	(Romania) A Dulgheru	6	6
(Sweden) J Larsson	2	1

Fourth round
(China) S Peng	3	4
26	(Romania) A Dulgheru	6	6

=== Bottom half ===
==== Section 5 ====
First round
(Romania) E Gallovits-Hall	4	4
(Germany) A Kerber	6	6
(Spain) L Domínguez Lino	6	6^{7}	6
Q	(Netherlands) A Rus	4	7	4
(Spain) A Parra Santonja	2	4
Q	(India) S Mirza	6	6
Q	(United States) S Stephens	4	2
(Czech Republic) B Záhlavová-Strýcová	6	6

Second round
5	(Italy) F Schiavone	6	6
(Germany) A Kerber	4	4
(Spain) L Domínguez Lino	5	6	6
31	(Bulgaria) T Pironkova	7	3	4
24	(Russia) M Kirilenko	5	6	6
Q	(India) S Mirza	7	3	0
(Czech Republic) B Záhlavová-Strýcová	1	0
9	(Poland) A Radwańska	6	6

Third round
5	(Italy) F Schiavone	6	7
(Spain) L Domínguez Lino	4	6^{2}
24	(Russia) M Kirilenko	6^{2}	3
9	(Poland) A Radwańska	7	6

Fourth round
5	(Italy) F Schiavone	0	2
9	(Poland) A Radwańska	6	6

==== Section 6 ====
First round
(Japan) A Morita	7	6
WC	(United Kingdom) H Watson	5	2
(Russia) E Makarova	6	6
(Russia) V Dushevina	2	2
(Italy) S Errani	3	7	6^{5}
(Kazakhstan) Y Shvedova	6	5	7
Q	(Australia) J Dokić	4	4
WC	(Russia) D Safina	6	6

Second round
15	(France) M Bartoli	6	2	6
(Japan) A Morita	3	6	1
(Russia) E Makarova	7	6
22	(Russia) A Kleybanova	5	3
28	(Australia) J Groth	6	3
(Kazakhstan) Y Shvedova	4	1	r
WC	(Russia) D Safina	6	3	2
3	(Russia) V Zvonareva	3	6	6

Third round
15	(France) M Bartoli	6	6
(Russia) E Makarova	0	2
28	(Australia) J Groth	6^{4}	2
3	(Russia) V Zvonareva	7	6

Fourth round
15	(France) M Bartoli	6	3	2
3	(Russia) V Zvonareva	2	6	6

==== Section 7 ====
First round
Q	(Czech Republic) L Hradecká	7	7
Q	(Chinese Taipei) Y-j Chan	5	5
Q	(Russia) V Manasieva	3	2
(Switzerland) T Bacsinszky	6	6
Q	(China) S Zhang	6	3	2
(Hungary) Á Szávay	2	6	6
WC	(United States) C Vandeweghe	2	3
(United States) V Lepchenko	6	6

Second round
8	(Belarus) V Azarenka	7	4	6
Q	(Czech Republic) L Hradecká	5	6	0
(Switzerland) T Bacsinszky	1	7	5
25	(Slovakia) D Cibulková	6	5	7
17	(Russia) A Pavlyuchenkova	6	6
(Hungary) Á Szávay	1	2
(United States) V Lepchenko	1	2
12	(Czech Republic) P Kvitová	6	6

Third round
8	(Belarus) V Azarenka	3	6	6
25	(Slovakia) D Cibulková	6	3	4
17	(Russia) A Pavlyuchenkova	6	6^{3}	6
12	(Czech Republic) P Kvitová	4	7	0

Fourth round
8	(Belarus) V Azarenka	3	6	6
17	(Russia) A Pavlyuchenkova	6	1	4

==== Section 8 ====
First round
(France) A Cornet	3	1
(France) V Razzano	6	6
(Japan) K Date-Krumm	6	6
(Czech Republic) Z Ondrášková	4	3
Q	(Georgia (country)) A Tatishvili	6	5	6
(Belarus) O Govortsova	3	7	3
Q	(Belarus) A Yakimova	6	6
(Russia) A Kudryavtseva	3	1

Second round
14	(Estonia) K Kanepi	3	6^{5}
(France) V Razzano	6	7
(Japan) K Date-Krumm	2	0
19	(Serbia) A Ivanovic	6	6
27	(Spain) MJ Martínez Sánchez	6	6
Q	(Georgia (country)) A Tatishvili	1	4
Q	(Belarus) A Yakimova	1	1
2	(Belgium) K Clijsters	6	6

Third round
(France) V Razzano	6	2	0^{r}
19	(Serbia) A Ivanovic	2	6	3
27	(Spain) MJ Martínez Sánchez	4	6	3
2	(Belgium) K Clijsters	6	4	6

Fourth round
19	(Serbia) A Ivanovic	6^{4}	6	6^{5}
2	(Belgium) K Clijsters	7	3	7
