= 2011 Sony Ericsson Open – Men's singles =

Men's singles
- 2011 Sony Ericsson Open

Final
- Champion: (Serbia) Novak Djokovic
- Runner-up: (Spain) Rafael Nadal
- Score: 4–6, 6–3, 7–6^{(7–4)}

Details
- Draw: 96 (12Q / 5WC)
- Seeds: 32

Events
Singles	men	women
Doubles	men	women
← 2010 ·	Sony Ericsson Open	· 2012 →

Novak Djokovic defeated Rafael Nadal in the final, 4–6, 6–3, 7–6^{(7–4)} to win the men's singles tennis title at the 2011 Miami Masters. With the win, Djokovic completed the Sunshine Double, having also won Indian Wells the fortnight before (also defeating Nadal in the final). Djokovic's unbeaten streak to the start of the 2011 season was extended to 24–0, and an overall winning streak of 26 matches.

Andy Roddick was the defending champion, but lost to Pablo Cuevas in the second round.

== Seeds ==
All seeds received a bye into the second round.

1. (Spain) Rafael Nadal (final)
2. (Serbia) Novak Djokovic (champion)
3. (Switzerland) Roger Federer (semifinals)
4. (Sweden) Robin Söderling (third round)
5. (United Kingdom) Andy Murray (second round)
6. (Spain) David Ferrer (quarterfinals)
7. (Czech Republic) Tomáš Berdych (quarterfinals)
8. (United States) Andy Roddick (second round)
9. (Spain) Fernando Verdasco (second round)
10. (Austria) Jürgen Melzer (second round)
11. (Spain) Nicolás Almagro (third round)
12. (Switzerland) Stanislas Wawrinka (second round)
13. (Russia) Mikhail Youzhny (third round)
14. (United States) Mardy Fish (semifinals)
15. (France) Jo-Wilfried Tsonga (third round)
16. (Serbia) Viktor Troicki (fourth round)
17. (France) Richard Gasquet (third round)
18. (Croatia) Marin Čilić (second round)
19. (United States) Sam Querrey (third round)
20. (Spain) Albert Montañés (second round, retired due to neck problems)
21. (Ukraine) Alexandr Dolgopolov (fourth round)
22. (Cyprus) Marcos Baghdatis (second round)
23. (France) Michaël Llodra (third round)
24. (Spain) Guillermo García López (second round)
25. (France) Gilles Simon (quarterfinals, retired due to stiff neck)
26. (Argentina) Juan Ignacio Chela (second round)
27. (Brazil) Thomaz Bellucci (second round)
28. (Latvia) Ernests Gulbis (second round)
29. (Germany) Philipp Kohlschreiber (second round)
30. (United States) John Isner (fourth round)
31. (Canada) Milos Raonic (second round)
32. (Argentina) Juan Mónaco (third round)

== Draw ==
=== Key ===
- Q = Qualifier
- WC = Wild card
- LL = Lucky loser
- Alt = Alternate
- SE = Special exempt
- PR = Protected ranking
- ITF = ITF entry
- JE = Junior exempt
- w/o = Walkover
- r = Retired
- d = Defaulted
- SR = Special ranking

=== Finals ===
Quarterfinals
1	(Spain) Rafael Nadal	6	3	6
7	(Czech Republic) Tomáš Berdych	2	6	3
3	(Switzerland) Roger Federer	3
25	(France) Gilles Simon	0^{r}
6	(Spain) David Ferrer	5	2
14	(United States) Mardy Fish	7	6
(South Africa) Kevin Anderson	4	2
2	(Serbia) Novak Djokovic	6	6

Semifinals
1	(Spain) Rafael Nadal	6	6
3	(Switzerland) Roger Federer	3	2
14	(United States) Mardy Fish	3	1
2	(Serbia) Novak Djokovic	6	6

Final
1	(Spain) Rafael Nadal	6	3	6^{4}
2	(Serbia) Novak Djokovic	4	6	7^{7}

=== Top half ===
==== Section 1 ====
First round
(France) J Chardy	6^{5}	2
(Japan) K Nishikori	7^{7}	6
(Spain) F López	4	7^{7}	6
(Lithuania) R Berankis	6	6^{5}	3
(Italy) A Seppi	6	6^{9}	6
(Germany) M Zverev	2	7^{11}	1
(Russia) T Gabashvili	6	7^{7}
(Germany) D Brands	2	6^{5}

Second round
1	(Spain) R Nadal	6	6
(Japan) K Nishikori	4	4
(Spain) F López	7^{7}	3	6
26	(Argentina) JI Chela	6^{3}	6	4
21	(Ukraine) A Dolgopolov	6	5
(Italy) A Seppi	1	3^{r}
(Russia) T Gabashvili	3	7^{7}	3
15	(France) J-W Tsonga	6	6^{3}	6

Third round
1	(Spain) R Nadal	6	6
(Spain) F López	3	3
21	(Ukraine) A Dolgopolov	6^{2}	6	7
15	(France) J-W Tsonga	7^{7}	4	5

Fourth round
1	(Spain) R Nadal	6	6
21	(Ukraine) A Dolgopolov	1	2

==== Section 2 ====
First round
(Portugal) F Gil	6	3	7^{8}
Q	(Chile) P Capdeville	1	6	6^{6}
(Germany) F Mayer	6	7^{8}
WC	(Croatia) I Karlović	4	6^{6}
(Argentina) C Berlocq	7	7^{8}
WC	(United States) J Sock	5	6^{6}
(France) A Mannarino	6^{3}	7^{7}	2
(Spain) R Ramírez Hidalgo	7^{7}	6^{3}	6

Second round
11	(Spain) N Almagro	6	3	6
(Portugal) F Gil	4	6	2
(Germany) F Mayer	6	3
20	(Spain) A Montañés	4	1^{r}
28	(Latvia) E Gulbis	1	6	4
(Argentina) C Berlocq	6	2	6
(Spain) R Ramírez Hidalgo	1	7^{7}	0
7	(Czech Republic) T Berdych	6	6^{4}	6

Third round
11	(Spain) N Almagro	1	6	1
(Germany) F Mayer	6	3	6
(Argentina) C Berlocq	6^{8}	5
7	(Czech Republic) T Berdych	7^{10}	7

Fourth round
(Germany) F Mayer	3	6	6^{4}
7	(Czech Republic) T Berdych	6	2	7^{7}

==== Section 3 ====
First round
(Italy) F Fognini	3	6^{5}
(Czech Republic) R Štěpánek	6	7^{7}
(Ukraine) S Stakhovsky	6	6
Q	(Bulgaria) G Dimitrov	2	4
(Slovenia) B Kavčič	6	4	5
Q	(Belgium) O Rochus	3	6	7
(Spain) P Riba	3	2
(Chinese Taipei) Y-h Lu	6	6

Second round
3	(Switzerland) R Federer	6	6
(Czech Republic) R Štěpánek	3	3
(Ukraine) S Stakhovsky	4	7^{7}	4
32	(Argentina) J Mónaco	6	6^{2}	6
22	(Cyprus) M Baghdatis	2	6	4
Q	(Belgium) O Rochus	6	4	6
(Chinese Taipei) Y-h Lu	1	0
13	(Russia) M Youzhny	6	6

Third round
3	(Switzerland) R Federer	7^{7}	6
32	(Argentina) J Mónaco	6^{4}	4
Q	(Belgium) O Rochus	1	6	6
13	(Russia) M Youzhny	6	3	3

Fourth round
3	(Switzerland) R Federer	6	6
Q	(Belgium) O Rochus	3	1

==== Section 4 ====
First round
(Germany) P Petzschner	6	7
(France) F Serra	1	5
(Serbia) J Tipsarević	6	7^{7}
(Netherlands) R Haase	4	6^{5}
WC	(United States) R Harrison	5	2
Q	(Germany) R Schüttler	7	6
(Uruguay) P Cuevas	6	7^{7}
(Germany) M Berrer	4	6^{2}

Second round
10	(Austria) J Melzer	3	4
(Germany) P Petzschner	6	6
(Serbia) J Tipsarević	6	7^{7}
18	(Croatia) M Čilić	3	6^{4}
25	(France) G Simon	6	6
Q	(Germany) R Schüttler	4	3
(Uruguay) P Cuevas	6	7^{7}
8	(United States) A Roddick	4	6^{4}

Third round
(Germany) P Petzschner	3	3
(Serbia) J Tipsarević	6	6
25	(France) G Simon	4	6	6
(Uruguay) P Cuevas	6	1	2

Fourth round
(Serbia) J Tipsarević	6	6^{4}	2
25	(France) G Simon	4	7^{7}	6

=== Bottom half ===
==== Section 5 ====
First round
Q	(United States) R Kendrick	4^{r}
Q	(Russia) I Kunitsyn	5
(India) S Devvarman	6	6
(Italy) P Starace	2	4
(Belgium) X Malisse	7^{7}	6
Q	(United States) R Sweeting	6^{3}	4
(Germany) B Becker	4	7^{7}	4
(Spain) M Granollers	6	6^{4}	6

Second round
6	(Spain) D Ferrer	6	6
Q	(Russia) I Kunitsyn	2	1
(India) S Devvarman	7^{7}	7
31	(Canada) M Raonic	6^{5}	5
23	(France) M Llodra	6	6
(Belgium) X Malisse	2	3
(Spain) M Granollers	6	6^{4}	6
12	(Switzerland) S Wawrinka	0	7^{7}	3

Third round
6	(Spain) D Ferrer	6	6
(India) S Devvarman	4	2
23	(France) M Llodra	5	6	5
(Spain) M Granollers	7	3	7

Fourth round
6	(Spain) D Ferrer	6	6
(Spain) M Granollers	1	2

==== Section 6 ====
First round
(France) J Benneteau	6	6
(Spain) D Gimeno Traver	4	3
(Croatia) I Ljubičić	6^{7}	1
Q	(Italy) P Lorenzi	7^{9}	6
PR	(Argentina) JM del Potro	6	6
(Brazil) R Mello	4	4
(Croatia) I Dodig	6^{7}	6	6
(Kazakhstan) A Golubev	7^{9}	4	0

Second round
14	(United States) M Fish	6	6
(France) J Benneteau	4	3
Q	(Italy) P Lorenzi	2	3
17	(France) R Gasquet	6	6
29	(Germany) P Kohlschreiber	7^{7}	4	5
PR	(Argentina) JM del Potro	6^{3}	6	7
(Croatia) I Dodig	6	2	4
4	(Sweden) R Söderling	3	6	6

Third round
14	(United States) M Fish	6	6
17	(France) R Gasquet	4	3
PR	(Argentina) JM del Potro	6	6
4	(Sweden) R Söderling	3	2

Fourth round
14	(United States) M Fish	7	7^{7}
PR	(Argentina) JM del Potro	5	6^{5}

==== Section 7 ====
First round
(Romania) V Hănescu	3	6	5
Q	(United States) A Bogomolov Jr.	6	4	7
(Colombia) S Giraldo	1	6	1
(Russia) I Andreev	6	2	6
(Russia) N Davydenko	4	3
(South Africa) K Anderson	6	6
WC	(Australia) B Tomic	4	6	5
(Spain) P Andújar	6	3	7

Second round
5	(United Kingdom) A Murray	1	5
Q	(United States) A Bogomolov Jr.	6	7
(Russia) I Andreev	4	7	6^{2}
30	(United States) J Isner	6	5	7^{7}
24	(Spain) G García López	3	7	4
(South Africa) K Anderson	6	5	6
(Spain) P Andújar	3	7^{7}	6
9	(Spain) F Verdasco	6	6^{3}	4

Third round
Q	(United States) A Bogomolov Jr.	2	6^{4}
30	(United States) J Isner	6	7^{7}
(South Africa) K Anderson	6	6
(Spain) P Andújar	2	3

Fourth round
30	(United States) J Isner	3	6^{4}
(South Africa) K Anderson	6	7^{7}

==== Section 8 ====
First round
(Germany) T Kamke	2	1
Q	(Turkey) M İlhan	6	6
(Finland) J Nieminen	6	3	2
(Kazakhstan) M Kukushkin	3	6	6
Q	(United States) M Russell	6	6^{7}	6^{3}
WC	(United States) J Blake	3	7^{9}	7^{7}
Q	(United States) D Young	4	3
(Uzbekistan) D Istomin	6	6

Second round
16	(Serbia) V Troicki	6	6
Q	(Turkey) M İlhan	3	3
(Kazakhstan) M Kukushkin	3	2
19	(United States) S Querrey	6	6
27	(Brazil) T Bellucci	6	4	6^{6}
WC	(United States) J Blake	2	6	7^{8}
(Uzbekistan) D Istomin	0	1
2	(Serbia) N Djokovic	6	6

Third round
16	(Serbia) V Troicki	7	3	7
19	(United States) S Querrey	6^{5}	6	5
WC	(United States) J Blake	2	0
2	(Serbia) N Djokovic	6	6

Fourth round
16	(Serbia) V Troicki	3	2
2	(Serbia) N Djokovic	6	6
