= 2011 Sony Ericsson Open – Women's doubles =

Women's doubles
- 2011 Sony Ericsson Open

Final
- Champion: (Slovakia) Daniela Hantuchová (Poland) Agnieszka Radwańska
- Runner-up: (United States) Liezel Huber (Russia) Nadia Petrova
- Score: 7–6(5), 2–6, [10–8]

Events
Singles	men	women
Doubles	men	women
← 2010 ·	Sony Ericsson Open	· 2012 →

Gisela Dulko and Flavia Pennetta were the defending champions, but lost in the quarterfinals to María José Martínez Sánchez and Anabel Medina Garrigues.
Daniela Hantuchová and Agnieszka Radwańska won the tournament, defeating Liezel Huber and Nadia Petrova 7–6(5), 2–6, [10–8] in the final.

== Seeds ==
1. (Argentina) Gisela Dulko / (Italy) Flavia Pennetta (quarterfinals)
2. (Czech Republic) Květa Peschke / (Slovenia) Katarina Srebotnik (first round)
3. (United States) Liezel Huber / (Russia) Nadia Petrova (final)
4. (United States) Vania King / (Kazakhstan) Yaroslava Shvedova (first round)
5. (Chinese Taipei) Chan Yung-jan / (China) Zheng Jie (first round)
6. (Czech Republic) Iveta Benešová / (Czech Republic) Barbora Záhlavová-Strýcová (second round)
7. (United States) Bethanie Mattek-Sands / (United States) Meghann Shaughnessy (second round)
8. (Spain) María José Martínez Sánchez / (Spain) Anabel Medina Garrigues (semifinals)

== Draw ==
=== Key ===
- Q = Qualifier
- WC = Wild card
- LL = Lucky loser
- Alt = Alternate
- SE = Special exempt
- PR = Protected ranking
- ITF = ITF entry
- JE = Junior exempt
- w/o = Walkover
- r = Retired
- d = Defaulted
- SR = Special ranking

=== Finals ===
Semifinals
8	(Spain) María José Martínez Sánchez (Spain) Anabel Medina Garrigues	3	7	[7]
3	(United States) Liezel Huber (Russia) Nadia Petrova	6	6^{3}	[10]
(Slovakia) Daniela Hantuchová (Poland) Agnieszka Radwańska	6	6
(Israel) Shahar Pe'er (China) Peng Shuai	2	4

Final
3	(United States) Liezel Huber (Russia) Nadia Petrova	6^{5}	6	[8]
(Slovakia) Daniela Hantuchová (Poland) Agnieszka Radwańska	7	2	[10]

=== Top half ===
First round
1	(Argentina) G Dulko (Italy) F Pennetta	6	6
(Belarus) O Govortsova (Russia) A Kudryavtseva	1	1
(Russia) M Kirilenko (Russia) A Pavlyuchenkova	3	7	[9]
(Germany) J Görges (United States) L Raymond	6	5	[11]
WC	(Russia) S Kuznetsova (Russia) V Zvonareva	6	6
(Romania) A Dulgheru (Slovakia) M Rybáriková	4	2
(South Africa) N Grandin (Czech Republic) V Uhlířová	6	2	[8]
8	(Spain) MJ Martínez Sánchez (Spain) A Medina Garrigues	4	6	[10]
3	(United States) L Huber (Russia) N Petrova	6	6
WC	(Croatia) P Martić (Croatia) A Tomljanović	1	4
(Chinese Taipei) S-w Hsieh (Romania) M Niculescu	6	7
(Czech Republic) A Hlaváčková (Czech Republic) L Hradecká	3	6^{4}
(United States) R Kops-Jones (United States) A Spears	4	7	[9]
WC	(United States) S Stephens (Belgium) Y Wickmayer	6	6^{4}	[11]
(Switzerland) T Bacsinszky (Hungary) Á Szávay	4	3
7	(United States) B Mattek-Sands (United States) M Shaughnessy	6	6

Second round
1	(Argentina) G Dulko (Italy) F Pennetta	6	6
(Germany) J Görges (United States) L Raymond	2	4
WC	(Russia) S Kuznetsova (Russia) V Zvonareva	1	4
8	(Spain) MJ Martínez Sánchez (Spain) A Medina Garrigues	6	6
3	(United States) L Huber (Russia) N Petrova	7	6
(Chinese Taipei) S-w Hsieh (Romania) M Niculescu	5	2
WC	(United States) S Stephens (Belgium) Y Wickmayer	1	7	[10]
7	(United States) B Mattek-Sands (United States) M Shaughnessy	6	6^{9}	[7]

Quarterfinals
1	(Argentina) G Dulko (Italy) F Pennetta	5	4
8	(Spain) MJ Martínez Sánchez (Spain) A Medina Garrigues	7	6
3	(United States) L Huber (Russia) N Petrova	6	6
WC	(United States) S Stephens (Belgium) Y Wickmayer	4	1

Semifinals
8	(Spain) MJ Martínez Sánchez (Spain) A Medina Garrigues	3	7	[7]
3	(United States) L Huber (Russia) N Petrova	6	6^{3}	[10]

=== Bottom half ===
First round
5	(Chinese Taipei) Y-j Chan (China) J Zheng	2	6	[7]
(India) S Mirza (Russia) E Vesnina	6	4	[10]
(Slovakia) D Hantuchová (Poland) A Radwańska	6	1	[10]
(Russia) V Dushevina (Russia) E Makarova	3	6	[7]
(Russia) M Kondratieva (Czech Republic) R Voráčová	4	6	[10]
(Italy) S Errani (Italy) R Vinci	6	2	[4]
(Spain) N Llagostera Vives (Spain) A Parra Santonja	3	6	[10]
4	(United States) V King (Kazakhstan) Y Shvedova	6	4	[7]
6	(Czech Republic) I Benešová (Czech Republic) B Záhlavová-Strýcová	6	7
(Poland) K Jans (Poland) A Rosolska	2	5
WC	(Serbia) A Ivanovic (Germany) A Petkovic	4	7	[10]
(Chinese Taipei) C-j Chuang (Australia) A Rodionova	6	5	[5]
(Russia) A Kleybanova (China) Z Yan	7	6
(United States) J Craybas (Australia) R Stubbs	6^{7}	2
(Israel) S Pe'er (China) S Peng	7	7
2	(Czech Republic) K Peschke (Slovenia) K Srebotnik	5	6^{6}

Second round
(India) S Mirza (Russia) E Vesnina	4	3
(Slovakia) D Hantuchová (Poland) A Radwańska	6	6
(Russia) M Kondratieva (Czech Republic) R Voráčová	2	5
(Spain) N Llagostera Vives (Spain) A Parra Santonja	6	7
6	(Czech Republic) I Benešová (Czech Republic) B Záhlavová-Strýcová	3	7	[6]
WC	(Serbia) A Ivanovic (Germany) A Petkovic	6	5	[10]
(Russia) A Kleybanova (China) Z Yan	3	6	[8]
(Israel) S Pe'er (China) S Peng	6	4	[10]

Quarterfinals
(Slovakia) D Hantuchová (Poland) A Radwańska	6^{4}	6	[10]
(Spain) N Llagostera Vives (Spain) A Parra Santonja	7	1	[1]
WC	(Serbia) A Ivanovic (Germany) A Petkovic
(Israel) S Pe'er (China) S Peng	w/o

Semifinals
(Slovakia) D Hantuchová (Poland) A Radwańska	6	6
(Israel) S Pe'er (China) S Peng	2	4
