= 2012 Sony Ericsson Open – Women's doubles =

Tennis tournament

Women's doubles
- 2012 Sony Ericsson Open

Final
- Champion: (Russia) Maria Kirilenko (Russia) Nadia Petrova
- Runner-up: (Italy) Sara Errani (Italy) Roberta Vinci
- Score: 7–6^{(7–0)}, 4–6, [10–4]

Events
Singles	men	women
Doubles	men	women
← 2011 ·	Sony Ericsson Open	· 2013 →

Daniela Hantuchová and Agnieszka Radwańska were the defending champions but were eliminated in the second round by Vera Dushevina and Shahar Pe'er.
Maria Kirilenko and Nadia Petrova defeated Sara Errani and Roberta Vinci 7–6^{(7–0)}, 4–6, [10–4] in the final to win the title.

== Seeds ==
1. (United States) Liezel Huber / (United States) Lisa Raymond (first round)
2. (Czech Republic) Květa Peschke / (Slovenia) Katarina Srebotnik (first round)
3. (India) Sania Mirza / (Russia) Elena Vesnina (first round)
4. (Czech Republic) Andrea Hlaváčková / (Czech Republic) Lucie Hradecká (first round)
5. (Russia) Maria Kirilenko / (Russia) Nadia Petrova (champions)
6. (Italy) Sara Errani / (Italy) Roberta Vinci (final)
7. (Kazakhstan) Yaroslava Shvedova / (Kazakhstan) Galina Voskoboeva (second round)
8. (Slovakia) Daniela Hantuchová / (Poland) Agnieszka Radwańska (second round)

== Draw ==
=== Key ===
- Q = Qualifier
- WC = Wild card
- LL = Lucky loser
- Alt = Alternate
- SE = Special exempt
- PR = Protected ranking
- ITF = ITF entry
- JE = Junior exempt
- w/o = Walkover
- r = Retired
- d = Defaulted
- SR = Special ranking

=== Finals ===
Semifinals
(United States) Vania King (Romania) Monica Niculescu	3	4
5	(Russia) Maria Kirilenko (Russia) Nadia Petrova	6	6
6	(Italy) Sara Errani (Italy) Roberta Vinci	7	6
WC	(Argentina) Gisela Dulko (Argentina) Paola Suárez	5	3

Final
5	(Russia) Maria Kirilenko (Russia) Nadia Petrova	7^{7}	4	[10]
6	(Italy) Sara Errani (Italy) Roberta Vinci	6^{0}	6	[4]

=== Top half ===
First round
1	(United States) L Huber (United States) L Raymond	1	4
(Germany) J Görges (Australia) S Stosur	6	6
(Spain) A Medina Garrigues (Italy) F Pennetta	6	6
(Chinese Taipei) C-j Chuang (Russia) A Kleybanova	1	3
(United States) V King (Romania) M Niculescu	7^{7}	6
(Japan) K Date-Krumm (China) S Zhang	6^{1}	3
WC	(Slovakia) D Cibulková (Serbia) J Janković	2	6^{5}
7	(Kazakhstan) Y Shvedova (Kazakhstan) G Voskoboeva	6	7^{7}
3	(India) S Mirza (Russia) E Vesnina	6	1	[9]
WC	(Russia) A Pavlyuchenkova (Czech Republic) L Šafářová	1	6	[11]
(Australia) J Gajdošová (Czech Republic) K Zakopalová	6	4	[8]
(Spain) N Llagostera Vives (Spain) A Parra Santonja	3	6	[10]
(Chinese Taipei) Y-j Chan (New Zealand) M Erakovic	3	4
(Russia) S Kuznetsova (Russia) V Zvonareva	6	6
(Chinese Taipei) S-w Hsieh (China) S Peng	6^{2}	4
5	(Russia) M Kirilenko (Russia) N Petrova	7^{7}	6

Second round
(Germany) J Görges (Australia) S Stosur	7^{7}	2	[9]
(Spain) A Medina Garrigues (Italy) F Pennetta	6^{4}	6	[11]
(United States) V King (Romania) M Niculescu	7	6
7	(Kazakhstan) Y Shvedova (Kazakhstan) G Voskoboeva	5	2
WC	(Russia) A Pavlyuchenkova (Czech Republic) L Šafářová	6	7^{7}
(Spain) N Llagostera Vives (Spain) A Parra Santonja	1	6^{2}
(Russia) S Kuznetsova (Russia) V Zvonareva	1	5
5	(Russia) M Kirilenko (Russia) N Petrova	6	7

Quarterfinals
(Spain) A Medina Garrigues (Italy) F Pennetta	5	2
(United States) V King (Romania) M Niculescu	7	6
WC	(Russia) A Pavlyuchenkova (Czech Republic) L Šafářová	1	6^{5}
5	(Russia) M Kirilenko (Russia) N Petrova	6	7^{7}

Semifinals
(United States) V King (Romania) M Niculescu	3	4
5	(Russia) M Kirilenko (Russia) N Petrova	6	6

=== Bottom half ===
First round
6	(Italy) S Errani (Italy) R Vinci	6	6
(United States) R Kops-Jones (United States) A Spears	2	1
(Czech Republic) I Benešová (Czech Republic) B Záhlavová-Strýcova	5	7	[10]
WC	(Germany) A-L Grönefeld (Croatia) P Martić	7	5	[12]
(Russia) E Makarova (China) J Zheng	6	6
(South Africa) N Grandin (Czech Republic) V Uhlířová	4	2
(Czech Republic) E Birnerová (Poland) K Jans-Ignacik	6	7
4	(Czech Republic) A Hlaváčková (Czech Republic) L Hradecká	4	5
8	(Slovakia) D Hantuchová (Poland) A Radwańska	6	6^{5}	[10]
(Romania) I-C Begu (Russia) N Bratchikova	3	7^{7}	[3]
(Belarus) O Govortsova (Australia) A Rodionova	5	6	[6]
(Russia) V Dushevina (Israel) S Pe'er	7	4	[10]
(Russia) A Kudryavtseva (Russia) A Panova	3	4
(Slovenia) A Klepač (Poland) A Rosolska	6	6
WC	(Argentina) G Dulko (Argentina) P Suárez	6	6
2	(Czech Republic) K Peschke (Slovenia) K Srebotnik	4	4

Second round
6	(Italy) S Errani (Italy) R Vinci	7^{7}	6
WC	(Germany) A-L Grönefeld (Croatia) P Martić	6^{4}	1
(Russia) E Makarova (China) J Zheng	6	6
(Czech Republic) E Birnerová (Poland) K Jans-Ignacik	4	2
8	(Slovakia) D Hantuchová (Poland) A Radwańska	2	5
(Russia) V Dushevina (Israel) S Pe'er	6	7
(Slovenia) A Klepač (Poland) A Rosolska
WC	(Argentina) G Dulko (Argentina) P Suárez	w/o

Quarterfinals
6	(Italy) S Errani (Italy) R Vinci	6	6
(Russia) E Makarova (China) J Zheng	3	3
(Russia) V Dushevina (Israel) S Pe'er	6^{2}	7^{7}	[6]
WC	(Argentina) G Dulko (Argentina) P Suárez	7^{7}	6^{3}	[10]

Semifinals
6	(Italy) S Errani (Italy) R Vinci	7	6
WC	(Argentina) G Dulko (Argentina) P Suárez	5	3
