= 2009 Sony Ericsson Open – Women's doubles =

Women's doubles
- 2009 Sony Ericsson Open

Final
- Champions: (Russia) Svetlana Kuznetsova (France) Amélie Mauresmo
- Runners-up: (Czech Republic) Květa Peschke (United States) Lisa Raymond
- Score: 4–6, 6–3, 10–3

Events
| Singles | men | women |
| Doubles | men | women |
| ← 2008 · | Sony Ericsson Open | · 2010 → |

Katarina Srebotnik and Ai Sugiyama were the defending champions, but Srebotnik chose not to participate this year due to injury.

Ai Sugiyama partnered with Daniela Hantuchová, but lost in the first round to Petra Martić and Coco Vandeweghe.

== Seeds ==
1. (Zimbabwe) Cara Black / (United States) Liezel Huber (second round)
2. (Spain) Anabel Medina Garrigues / (Spain) Virginia Ruano Pascual (quarterfinals)
3. (Czech Republic) Květa Peschke / (United States) Lisa Raymond (final)
4. (Australia) Samantha Stosur / (Australia) Rennae Stubbs (quarterfinals)
5. (Slovakia) Daniela Hantuchová / (Japan) Ai Sugiyama (first round)
6. (Spain) Nuria Llagostera Vives / (Spain) María José Martínez Sánchez (quarterfinals)
7. (Chinese Taipei) Chan Yung-jan / (Italy) Francesca Schiavone (withdrew)
8. (Russia) Maria Kirilenko / (Italy) Flavia Pennetta (second round)

== Draw ==
=== Key ===
- Q = Qualifier
- WC = Wild card
- LL = Lucky loser
- Alt = Alternate
- SE = Special exempt
- PR = Protected ranking
- ITF = ITF entry
- JE = Junior exempt
- w/o = Walkover
- r = Retired
- d = Defaulted
- SR = Special ranking

=== Finals ===
Semifinals
WC | (Russia) Svetlana Kuznetsova (France) Amélie Mauresmo | 7 | 6
(Germany) Anna-Lena Grönefeld (Switzerland) Patty Schnyder | 6^{6} | 3
3 | (Czech Republic) Květa Peschke (United States) Lisa Raymond | 7 | 6
(Chinese Taipei) Chuang Chia-jung (India) Sania Mirza | 6^{5} | 4

Final
WC | (Russia) Svetlana Kuznetsova (France) Amélie Mauresmo | 4 | 6 | [10]
3 | (Czech Republic) Květa Peschke (United States) Lisa Raymond | 6 | 3 | [3]

=== Top half ===
First round
1 | (Zimbabwe) C Black (United States) L Huber | 6 | 6
(China) S Peng (Ukraine) O Savchuk | 1 | 1
(Romania) S Cîrstea (Denmark) C Wozniacki | 6 | 4 | [8]
WC | (Russia) S Kuznetsova (France) A Mauresmo | 4 | 6 | [10]
(United States) B Mattek-Sands (Russia) N Petrova | 6 | 2 | [10]
WC | (United States) C McHale (United States) S Stephens | 2 | 6 | [2]
(Ukraine) M Koryttseva (Kazakhstan) G Voskoboeva | 3 | 7 | [8]
6 | (Spain) N Llagostera Vives (Spain) MJ Martínez Sánchez | 6 | 5 | [10]
4 | (Australia) S Stosur (Australia) R Stubbs | 3 | 6 | [10]
(China) Z Yan (China) J Zheng | 6 | 3 | [5]
(Russia) A Pavlyuchenkova (Russia) E Vesnina | 7 | 6
(Czech Republic) L Hradecká (Czech Republic) V Uhlířová | 6^{5} | 4
(Germany) A-L Grönefeld (Switzerland) P Schnyder | 6^{10} | 7 | [10]
(France) N Dechy (Italy) M Santangelo | 7 | 5 | [3]
WC | (Croatia) P Martić (United States) C Vandeweghe | 2 | 7 | [10]
5 | (Slovakia) D Hantuchová (Japan) A Sugiyama | 6 | 5 | [5]

Second round
1 | (Zimbabwe) C Black (United States) L Huber | 4 | 6 | [4]
WC | (Russia) S Kuznetsova (France) A Mauresmo | 6 | 4 | [10]
(United States) B Mattek-Sands (Russia) N Petrova | 5 | 4
6 | (Spain) N Llagostera Vives (Spain) MJ Martínez Sánchez | 7 | 6
4 | (Australia) S Stosur (Australia) R Stubbs | 6 | 7
(Russia) A Pavlyuchenkova (Russia) E Vesnina | 3 | 6^{4}
(Germany) A-L Grönefeld (Switzerland) P Schnyder | 6 | 6
WC | (Croatia) P Martić (United States) C Vandeweghe | 1 | 2

Quarterfinals
WC | (Russia) S Kuznetsova (France) A Mauresmo | 5 | 7 | [10]
6 | (Spain) N Llagostera Vives (Spain) MJ Martínez Sánchez | 7 | 5 | [6]
4 | (Australia) S Stosur (Australia) R Stubbs | 7 | 2 | [8]
(Germany) A-L Grönefeld (Switzerland) P Schnyder | 6^{5} | 6 | [10]

Semifinals
WC | (Russia) S Kuznetsova (France) A Mauresmo | 7 | 6
(Germany) A-L Grönefeld (Switzerland) P Schnyder | 6^{6} | 3

=== Bottom half ===
First round
ALT | (United States) R Kops-Jones (United States) A Spears | 6 | 6
ALT | (Poland) K Jans (Poland) A Rosolska | 4 | 4
(Ukraine) A Bondarenko (Ukraine) K Bondarenko | 2 | 6 | [11]
(United States) J Craybas (Russia) E Makarova | 6 | 4 | [9]
(Uzbekistan) A Amanmuradova (United States) V King | 3 | 3
(Russia) V Dushevina (Kazakhstan) Y Shvedova | 6 | 6
(Russia) A Kudryavtseva (Russia) A Rodionova | 2 | 4
3 | (Czech Republic) K Peschke (United States) L Raymond | 6 | 6
8 | (Russia) M Kirilenko (Italy) F Pennetta | 7 | 6
(Poland) A Radwańska (Hungary) Á Szávay | 6^{7} | 3
(Czech Republic) I Benešová (Czech Republic) B Záhlavová-Strýcová | 4 | 5
(Chinese Taipei) C-J Chuang (India) S Mirza | 6 | 7
(Romania) E Gallovits (Belarus) T Poutchek | 6^{2} | 1
(Argentina) G Dulko (Israel) S Pe'er | 7 | 6
(Russia) A Kleybanova (Romania) M Niculescu | 2 | 6 | [8]
2 | (Spain) A Medina Garrigues (Spain) V Ruano Pascual | 6 | 1 | [10]

Second round
ALT | (United States) R Kops-Jones (United States) A Spears | 6 | 6
(Ukraine) A Bondarenko (Ukraine) K Bondarenko | 4 | 4
(Russia) V Dushevina (Kazakhstan) Y Shvedova | 7 | 4 | [8]
3 | (Czech Republic) K Peschke (United States) L Raymond | 6^{5} | 6 | [10]
8 | (Russia) M Kirilenko (Italy) F Pennetta | 6 | 6^{5} | [4]
(Chinese Taipei) C-J Chuang (India) S Mirza | 4 | 7 | [10]
(Argentina) G Dulko (Israel) S Pe'er | 4 | 3
2 | (Spain) A Medina Garrigues (Spain) V Ruano Pascual | 6 | 6

Quarterfinals
ALT | (United States) R Kops-Jones (United States) A Spears | 3 | 2
3 | (Czech Republic) K Peschke (United States) L Raymond | 6 | 6
(Chinese Taipei) C-J Chuang (India) S Mirza | 6 | 7
2 | (Spain) A Medina Garrigues (Spain) V Ruano Pascual | 3 | 6^{4}

Semifinals
3 | (Czech Republic) K Peschke (United States) L Raymond | 7 | 6
(Chinese Taipei) C-J Chuang (India) S Mirza | 6^{5} | 4
