= 2010 Sony Ericsson Open – Women's singles =

Women's singles
- 2010 Sony Ericsson Open

Final
- Champion: (Belgium) Kim Clijsters
- Runner-up: (United States) Venus Williams
- Score: 6–2, 6–1

Details
- Draw: 96
- Seeds: 32

Events
Singles	men	women
Doubles	men	women
← 2009 ·	Sony Ericsson Open	· 2011 →

Kim Clijsters defeated Venus Williams in the final, 6–2, 6–1 to win the women's singles tennis title at the 2010 Miami Open. It was her second Miami Open title.

Victoria Azarenka was the defending champion, but lost to Clijsters in the fourth round.

== Seeds ==
All seeds receive a bye into the second round.

1. (Russia) Svetlana Kuznetsova (fourth round)
2. (Denmark) Caroline Wozniacki (quarterfinals)
3. (United States) Venus Williams (final)
4. (Belarus) Victoria Azarenka (fourth round)
5. (Russia) Elena Dementieva (second round)
6. (Poland) Agnieszka Radwańska (quarterfinals)
7. (Serbia) Jelena Janković (fourth round)
8. (China) Li Na (second round)
9. (Australia) Samantha Stosur (quarterfinals)
10. (Italy) Flavia Pennetta (second round)
11. (Russia) Vera Zvonareva (fourth round)
12. (Belgium) Yanina Wickmayer (quarterfinals)
13. (France) Marion Bartoli (semifinals)
14. (Belgium) Kim Clijsters (champion)
15. (Italy) Francesca Schiavone (third round)
16. (Russia) Nadia Petrova (third round)
17. (Israel) Shahar Pe'er (third round)
18. (France) Aravane Rezaï (second round)
19. (Slovakia) Daniela Hantuchová (fourth round)
20. (China) Zheng Jie (second round)
21. (Ukraine) Alona Bondarenko (second round)
22. (Russia) Anastasia Pavlyuchenkova (fourth round)
23. (Germany) Sabine Lisicki (second round, retired due to a left ankle injury)
24. (Russia) Alisa Kleybanova (second round)
25. (Serbia) Ana Ivanovic (third round)
26. (Slovakia) Dominika Cibulková (third round)
27. (Hungary) Ágnes Szávay (third round)
28. (Russia) Elena Vesnina (third round)
29. (Spain) María José Martínez Sánchez (second round)
30. (Spain) Anabel Medina Garrigues (second round)
31. (Canada) Aleksandra Wozniak (second round)
32. (Russia) Maria Kirilenko (third round)

== Draw ==
=== Key ===
- Q = Qualifier
- WC = Wild card
- LL = Lucky loser
- Alt = Alternate
- SE = Special exempt
- PR = Protected ranking
- ITF = ITF entry
- JE = Junior exempt
- w/o = Walkover
- r = Retired
- d = Defaulted
- SR = Special ranking

=== Finals ===
Quarterfinals
13	(France) Marion Bartoli	6	7
12	(Belgium) Yanina Wickmayer	4	5
3	(United States) Venus Williams	6	6
6	(Poland) Agnieszka Radwańska	3	1
9	(Australia) Samantha Stosur	3	5
14	(Belgium) Kim Clijsters	6	7
WC	(Belgium) Justine Henin	6^{5}	6	6
2	(Denmark) Caroline Wozniacki	7^{7}	3	4

Semifinals
13	(France) Marion Bartoli	3	4
3	(United States) Venus Williams	6	6
14	(Belgium) Kim Clijsters	6	6^{3}	7^{8}
WC	(Belgium) Justine Henin	2	7^{7}	6^{6}

Final
3	(United States) Venus Williams	2	1
14	(Belgium) Kim Clijsters	6	6

=== Top half ===
==== Section 1 ====
First round
(China) S Peng	6	1	6
(United States) V King	4	6	3
WC	(Australia) A Molik	6	6
PR	(United States) A Harkleroad	1	1
(Argentina) G Dulko	6	6
(Belarus) O Govortsova	4	1
(Czech Republic) L Hradecká	6	4	2
(Slovakia) M Rybáriková	3	6	6

Second round
1	(Russia) S Kuznetsova	6	3	6
(China) S Peng	2	6	4
WC	(Australia) A Molik	0	0
27	(Hungary) Á Szávay	6	6
21	(Ukraine) A Bondarenko	5	2
(Argentina) G Dulko	7	6
(Slovakia) M Rybáriková	2	4
13	(France) M Bartoli	6	6

Third round
1	(Russia) S Kuznetsova	6	6
27	(Hungary) Á Szávay	2	3
(Argentina) G Dulko	6^{2}	4
13	(France) M Bartoli	7	6

Fourth round
1	(Russia) S Kuznetsova	3	0
13	(France) M Bartoli	6	6

==== Section 2 ====
First round
(Czech Republic) I Benešová	2	4
Q	(United Kingdom) E Baltacha	6	6
(France) J Coin	7	6^{1}	3
WC	(Croatia) P Martić	5	7	6
(Czech Republic) B Záhlavová-Strýcová	3	0
(Slovenia) P Hercog	6	6
(Switzerland) T Bacsinszky	6	6
Q	(United States) B Mattek-Sands	4	4

Second round
12	(Belgium) Y Wickmayer	6	6
Q	(United Kingdom) E Baltacha	1	3
WC	(Croatia) P Martić	7	5	6
18	(France) A Rezaï	5	7	4
31	(Canada) A Wozniak	6^{5}	3
(Slovenia) P Hercog	7	6
(Switzerland) T Bacsinszky	6	4	7
8	(China) N Li	4	6	6^{3}

Third round
12	(Belgium) Y Wickmayer	6	6
WC	(Croatia) P Martić	3	3
(Slovenia) P Hercog	2	2
(Switzerland) T Bacsinszky	6	6

Fourth round
12	(Belgium) Y Wickmayer	6	6
(Switzerland) T Bacsinszky	0	1

==== Section 3 ====
First round
WC	(Portugal) M Larcher de Brito	5	6^{9}
(Romania) S Cîrstea	7	7
Q	(Russia) R Kulikova	6	3	4
(Italy) R Vinci	3	6	6
(Slovenia) K Srebotnik	2	7	1
(Switzerland) P Schnyder	6	6^{3}	6
(Russia) A Chakvetadze	5	6	4
(Japan) K Date-Krumm	7	3	6

Second round
3	(United States) V Williams	6	6
(Romania) S Cîrstea	4	3
(Italy) R Vinci	6	7
30	(Spain) A Medina Garrigues	4	6^{5}
19	(Slovakia) D Hantuchová	6	6
(Switzerland) P Schnyder	1	4
(Japan) K Date-Krumm	3	6^{7}
16	(Russia) N Petrova	6	7

Third round
3	(United States) V Williams	6	6
(Italy) R Vinci	1	4
19	(Slovakia) D Hantuchová	6	6
16	(Russia) N Petrova	2	4

Fourth round
3	(United States) V Williams	1	7	6
19	(Slovakia) D Hantuchová	6	5	4

==== Section 4 ====
First round
Q	(Australia) A Rodionova	4	2
(Germany) A Petkovic	6	6
(Kazakhstan) Y Shvedova	6^{1}	7	7
WC	(Croatia) A Tomljanović	7	6^{3}	5
(Austria) S Bammer	3	6	3
Q	(France) P Parmentier	6	3	6
(Russia) E Makarova	6	7
Q	(Australia) C Dellacqua	3	5

Second round
10	(Italy) F Pennetta	3	6	0
(Germany) A Petkovic	6	3	6
(Kazakhstan) Y Shvedova	6	0
23	(Germany) S Lisicki	3	1	r
25	(Serbia) A Ivanovic	6	6
Q	(France) P Parmentier	4	3
(Russia) E Makarova	5	0
6	(Poland) A Radwańska	7	6

Third round
(Germany) A Petkovic	0	7	5
(Kazakhstan) Y Shvedova	6	5	7
25	(Serbia) A Ivanovic	5	5
6	(Poland) A Radwańska	7	7

Fourth round
(Kazakhstan) Y Shvedova	1	4
6	(Poland) A Radwańska	6	6

=== Bottom half ===
==== Section 5 ====
First round
(Germany) K Barrois	6	3	3
Q	(Ukraine) M Koryttseva	2	6	6
(Germany) J Görges	7	6
Q	(Japan) A Morita	6^{3}	4
Q	(United States) V Lepchenko	3	0	r
(France) V Razzano	6	5
WC	(Russia) A Pivovarova	1	6^{3}
(Spain) C Suárez Navarro	6	7

Second round
7	(Serbia) J Janković	6	6
Q	(Ukraine) M Koryttseva	4	0
(Germany) J Görges	3	4
28	(Russia) E Vesnina	6	6
20	(China) J Zheng	4	2
(France) V Razzano	6	6
(Spain) C Suárez Navarro	6	5	2
9	(Australia) S Stosur	4	7	6

Third round
7	(Serbia) J Janković	7	6
28	(Russia) E Vesnina	6^{3}	3
(France) V Razzano	6	5	1
9	(Australia) S Stosur	4	7	6

Fourth round
7	(Serbia) J Janković	1	6^{9}
9	(Australia) S Stosur	6	7

==== Section 6 ====
First round
(Czech Republic) P Kvitová	6	6
(Italy) T Garbin	4	4
(Russia) V Dushevina	6	1	4
(Russia) A Kudryavtseva	4	6	6
(Czech Republic) L Šafářová	6^{1}	6	6
(Estonia) K Kanepi	7	4	3
(Romania) A Dulgheru	6	6
(Romania) IR Olaru	1	3

Second round
14	(Belgium) K Clijsters	6	6
(Czech Republic) P Kvitová	1	1
(Russia) A Kudryavtseva	1	0
17	(Israel) S Pe'er	6	6
29	(Spain) MJ Martínez Sánchez	6	6^{3}	2
(Czech Republic) L Šafářová	4	7	6
(Romania) A Dulgheru	3	2
4	(Belarus) V Azarenka	6	6

Third round
14	(Belgium) K Clijsters	6	6
17	(Israel) S Pe'er	0	1
(Czech Republic) L Šafářová	4	2
4	(Belarus) V Azarenka	6	6

Fourth round
14	(Belgium) K Clijsters	6	6
4	(Belarus) V Azarenka	4	0

==== Section 7 ====
First round
(United States) J Craybas	2	2
WC	(Belgium) J Henin	6	6
Q	(Sweden) S Arvidsson	6	6
(Italy) A Brianti	2	4
(Germany) T Malek	1	0
(Italy) S Errani	6	6
(United States) M Oudin	6	6
Q	(Netherlands) M Krajicek	2	4

Second round
5	(Russia) E Dementieva	3	2
WC	(Belgium) J Henin	6	6
Q	(Sweden) S Arvidsson	0	2
26	(Slovakia) D Cibulková	6	6
24	(Russia) A Kleybanova	4	5
(Italy) S Errani	6	7
(United States) M Oudin	1	2
11	(Russia) V Zvonareva	6	6

Third round
WC	(Belgium) J Henin	6	6
26	(Slovakia) D Cibulková	4	4
(Italy) S Errani	2	3
11	(Russia) V Zvonareva	6	6

Fourth round
WC	(Belgium) J Henin	6	6
11	(Russia) V Zvonareva	1	4

==== Section 8 ====
First round
(Switzerland) S Vögele	3	6	2
(France) A Cornet	6	0	6
(United Kingdom) A Keothavong	4	2
(Austria) T Paszek	6	6
(Hungary) M Czink	3	6	7
WC	(Netherlands) A Rus	6	1	6^{6}
Q	(Bulgaria) T Pironkova	6	6
WC	(United Kingdom) H Watson	4	2

Second round
15	(Italy) F Schiavone	6	6
(France) A Cornet	3	2
(Austria) T Paszek	6^{4}	6	3
22	(Russia) A Pavlyuchenkova	7	4	6
32	(Russia) M Kirilenko	4	6	7
(Hungary) M Czink	6	2	6^{4}
Q	(Bulgaria) T Pironkova	6	3	4
2	(Denmark) C Wozniacki	3	6	6

Third round
15	(Italy) F Schiavone	5	3
22	(Russia) A Pavlyuchenkova	7	6
32	(Russia) M Kirilenko	6	1	4
2	(Denmark) C Wozniacki	1	6	6

Fourth round
22	(Russia) A Pavlyuchenkova	2	2
2	(Denmark) C Wozniacki	6	6
