= 2010 Mutua Madrileña Madrid Open – Women's singles =

Women's singles
- 2010 Mutua Madrileña Madrid Open

Final
- Champion: (France) Aravane Rezaï
- Runner-up: (United States) Venus Williams
- Score: 6–2, 7–5

Details
- Draw: 60 (5WC/8Q/1LL)
- Seeds: 16

Events
Singles	men	women
Doubles	men	women
- Madrid Open

Aravane Rezaï defeated Venus Williams in the final, 6–2, 7–5 to win the women's singles tennis title at the 2010 Madrid Open.

Dinara Safina was the defending champion, but lost to Klára Zakopalová in the first round.

== Seeds ==
1. (United States) Serena Williams (third round)
2. (Denmark) Caroline Wozniacki (second round)
3. (Russia) Dinara Safina (first round)
4. (United States) Venus Williams (final)
5. (Russia) Svetlana Kuznetsova (first round)
6. (Russia) Elena Dementieva (second round)
7. (Serbia) Jelena Janković (quarterfinals)
8. (Australia) Samantha Stosur (quarterfinals)
9. (Poland) Agnieszka Radwańska (second round)
10. (Belarus) Victoria Azarenka (first round, retired due to right adductor strain)
11. (Russia) Maria Sharapova (first round)
12. (France) Marion Bartoli (second round)
13. (China) Li Na (quarterfinals)
14. (Italy) Flavia Pennetta (second round)
15. (Italy) Francesca Schiavone (third round)
16. (Russia) Nadia Petrova (quarterfinals)

=== Bye ===
The four Rome semifinalists received a bye into the second round. They are as follows:

- (United States) Serena Williams (third round)
- (Serbia) Jelena Janković (quarterfinals)
- (Serbia) Ana Ivanovic (second round)
- (Spain) María José Martínez Sánchez (second round)

== Draw ==
Key

- Q = Qualifier
- WC = Wild card
- LL = Lucky loser
- Alt = Alternate
- ITF = ITF entry
- PR = Protected ranking
- SR = Special ranking
- SE = Special exempt
- JE = Junior exempt
- JR = Junior Accelerator Programme entrant
- CO = College Accelerator Programme entrant
- NG = Next Gen Accelerator Program entrant
- w/o = Walkover
- r = Retired
- d = Defaulted

=== Finals ===
Quarterfinals
16	(Russia) Nadia Petrova	1	6	4
(Czech Republic) Lucie Šafářová	6	1	6
(France) Aravane Rezaï	7	6
7	(Serbia) Jelena Janković	5	4
8	(Australia) Samantha Stosur	3	3
4	(United States) Venus Williams	6	6
(Israel) Shahar Pe'er	6	3	6
13	(China) Li Na	4	6	4

Semifinals
(Czech Republic) Lucie Šafářová	1	0^{r}
(France) Aravane Rezaï	6	0
4	(United States) Venus Williams	6	6
(Israel) Shahar Pe'er	3	0

Final
(France) Aravane Rezaï	6	7
4	(United States) Venus Williams	2	5

=== Top half ===
==== Section 1 ====
First round
(Russia) V Dushevina	6	6
Q	(Belgium) K Flipkens	2	1
(Russia) A Pavlyuchenkova	6	7
(Slovakia) D Hantuchová	4	6^{2}
(Russia) E Vesnina	6	2	3
16	(Russia) N Petrova	4	6	6
11	(Russia) M Sharapova	4	3
(Czech Republic) L Šafářová	6	6
(Belarus) O Govortsova	7	6
LL	(Italy) T Garbin	5	2
(Romania) A Dulgheru	6	0
(Hungary) M Czink	1	0^{r}
(Canada) A Wozniak	0	1
6	(Russia) E Dementieva	6	6

Second round
1	(United States) S Williams	6^{2}	7	7
(Russia) V Dushevina	7	6^{5}	6^{5}
(Russia) A Pavlyuchenkova	2	5
16	(Russia) N Petrova	6	7
(Czech Republic) L Šafářová	4	6	7
(Belarus) O Govortsova	6	2	5
(Romania) A Dulgheru	6	3	7
6	(Russia) E Dementieva	1	6	5

Third round
1	(United States) S Williams	6	2	3
16	(Russia) N Petrova	4	6	6
(Czech Republic) L Šafářová	6^{4}	6	7
(Romania) A Dulgheru	7	1	6^{6}

Quarterfinals
16	(Russia) N Petrova	1	6	4
(Czech Republic) L Šafářová	6	1	6

==== Section 2 ====
First round
3	(Russia) D Safina	6^{1}	6^{3}
Q	(Czech Republic) K Zakopalová	7	7
(Belgium) J Henin	6	5	0
(France) A Rezaï	4	7	6
(Germany) A Petkovic	6^{3}	6	7
(Italy) S Errani	7	1	5
(Romania) S Cîrstea	1	6	1
14	(Italy) F Pennetta	6	1	6
12	(France) M Bartoli	3	6	6
(Slovenia) P Hercog	6	4	4
(China) J Zheng	6	3	2
(Spain) A Medina Garrigues	3	6	6

Second round
Q	(Czech Republic) K Zakopalová	3	5
(France) A Rezaï	6	7
(Germany) A Petkovic	7	6
14	(Italy) F Pennetta	6^{3}	3
12	(France) M Bartoli	2	0
(Spain) A Medina Garrigues	6	6
WC	(Serbia) A Ivanovic	6	4	1
7	(Serbia) J Janković	4	6	6

Third round
(France) A Rezaï	6	7
(Germany) A Petkovic	4	6^{8}
(Spain) A Medina Garrigues	2	0
7	(Serbia) J Janković	6	6

Quarterfinals
(France) A Rezaï	7	6
7	(Serbia) J Janković	5	4

=== Bottom half ===
==== Section 3 ====
First round
8	(Australia) S Stosur	7	7
(Argentina) G Dulko	6^{3}	5
(Hungary) Á Szávay	2^{r}
(Switzerland) P Schnyder	5
(Russia) M Kirilenko	2	2
9	(Poland) A Radwańska	6	6
15	(Italy) F Schiavone	6	6
Q	(France) A Cornet	2	2
(Kazakhstan) Y Shvedova	4	6	3
WC	(Austria) S Bammer	6	3	6
(Russia) V Zvonareva	6	6
(United States) M Oudin	3	4
Q	(Switzerland) S Vögele	4	2
4	(United States) V Williams	6	6

Second round
8	(Australia) S Stosur	7	6
(Spain) MJ Martínez Sánchez	6^{2}	4
(Switzerland) P Schnyder	3	6	6
9	(Poland) A Radwańska	6	4	4
15	(Italy) F Schiavone	6	6
WC	(Austria) S Bammer	2	1
(Russia) V Zvonareva	5	3
4	(United States) V Williams	7	6

Third round
8	(Australia) S Stosur	7	6
(Switzerland) P Schnyder	6^{3}	2
15	(Italy) F Schiavone	6	1	2
4	(United States) V Williams	3	6	6

Quarterfinals
8	(Australia) S Stosur	3	3
4	(United States) V Williams	6	6

==== Section 4 ====
First round
5	(Russia) S Kuznetsova	3	6	0
(Israel) S Pe'er	6	2	6
Q	(Uzbekistan) A Amanmuradova	3	2
(Russia) A Kleybanova	6	6
WC	(Spain) V Ruano Pascual	3	2
WC	(Spain) A Parra Santonja	6	6
WC	(China) S Peng	3
10	(Belarus) V Azarenka	0^{r}
13	(China) N Li	6	6
Q	(Spain) B García Vidagany	0	2
(Slovakia) D Cibulková	6	6
Q	(Czech Republic) I Benešová	2	2
(Slovakia) M Rybáriková	6	1	4
(Ukraine) A Bondarenko	2	6	6
Q	(Czech Republic) P Kvitová	4	2
2	(Denmark) C Wozniacki	6	6

Second round
(Israel) S Pe'er	7	6
(Russia) A Kleybanova	6^{4}	0
WC	(Spain) A Parra Santonja	1	7	6
WC	(China) S Peng	6	6^{1}	3
13	(China) N Li	6	3	7
(Slovakia) D Cibulková	2	6	5
(Ukraine) A Bondarenko	6	6
2	(Denmark) C Wozniacki	2	3

Third round
(Israel) S Pe'er	7	6
WC	(Spain) A Parra Santonja	5	2
13	(China) N Li	6	6
(Ukraine) A Bondarenko	3	4

Quarterfinals
(Israel) S Pe'er	6	3	6
13	(China) N Li	4	6	4

== Qualifying ==
=== Qualifying seeds ===
1. (Switzerland) Timea Bacsinszky (first round)
2. (Czech Republic) Iveta Benešová (qualified)
3. (Italy) Tathiana Garbin (qualifying competition, lucky loser)
4. (Italy) Roberta Vinci (first round)
5. (Czech Republic) Petra Kvitová (qualified)
6. (Croatia) Petra Martić (first round, retired)
7. (Switzerland) Stefanie Vögele (qualified)
8. (Belgium) Kirsten Flipkens (qualified)
9. (France) Alizé Cornet (qualified)
10. (Czech Republic) Barbora Záhlavová-Strýcová (first round)
11. (United States) Vania King (first round)
12. (Italy) Alberta Brianti (qualifying competition)
13. (Russia) Alla Kudryavtseva (qualifying competition)
14. (Japan) Ayumi Morita (qualifying competition)
15. (Russia) Ekaterina Makarova (qualifying competition)
16. (Czech Republic) Klára Zakopalová (qualified)

=== Qualifiers ===
1. (Czech Republic) Klara Zakopalová
2. (Czech Republic) Iveta Benešová
3. (France) Alizé Cornet
4. (Uzbekistan) Akgul Amanmuradova
5. (Czech Republic) Petra Kvitová
6. (Spain) Beatriz García Vidagany
7. (Switzerland) Stefanie Vögele
8. (Belgium) Kirsten Flipkens

=== Lucky loser ===
1. (Italy) Tathiana Garbin

=== Qualifying draw ===
==== First qualifier ====
First round
1	(Switzerland) Timea Bacsinszky	6	3	3
(Colombia) Mariana Duque Mariño	2	6	6
WC	(Romania) Simona Halep	3	3
16	(Czech Republic) Klára Zakopalová	6	6

Qualifying competition
(Colombia) Mariana Duque Mariño	6	2	4
16	(Czech Republic) Klára Zakopalová	4	6	6

==== Second qualifier ====
First round
2	(Czech Republic) Iveta Benešová	6	6^{5}	6
(United States) Varvara Lepchenko	4	7^{7}	1
(Bulgaria) Tsvetana Pironkova	7	1	3
12	(Italy) Alberta Brianti	5	6	6

Qualifying competition
2	(Czech Republic) Iveta Benešová	6	7
12	(Italy) Alberta Brianti	4	5

==== Third qualifier ====
First round
3	(Italy) Tathiana Garbin	1	6	6
(Russia) Ekaterina Bychkova	6	4	4
(Chinese Taipei) Chan Yung-jan	5	5
9	(France) Alizé Cornet	7	7

Qualifying competition
3	(Italy) Tathiana Garbin	6	5	1
9	(France) Alizé Cornet	3	7	6

==== Fourth qualifier ====
First round
4	(Italy) Roberta Vinci	6^{4}	3
(Uzbekistan) Akgul Amanmuradova	7^{7}	6
WC	(Spain) Sílvia Soler Espinosa	6^{4}	2
14	(Japan) Ayumi Morita	7^{7}	6

Qualifying competition
(Uzbekistan) Akgul Amanmuradova	6	6
14	(Japan) Ayumi Morita	3	2

==== Fifth qualifier ====
First round
5	(Czech Republic) Petra Kvitová	6	6
(Portugal) Michelle Larcher de Brito	4	2
(Australia) Alicia Molik	2	3
13	(Russia) Alla Kudryavtseva	6	6

Qualifying competition
5	(Czech Republic) Petra Kvitová	7	6
13	(Russia) Alla Kudryavtseva	5	1

==== Sixth qualifier ====
First round
6	(Croatia) Petra Martić	6	1^{r}
WC	(Spain) Beatriz García Vidagany	4	2
(Chinese Taipei) Chang Kai-chen	7^{8}	5	3
15	(Russia) Ekaterina Makarova	6^{6}	7	6

Qualifying competition
WC	(Spain) Beatriz García Vidagany	5	7^{7}	6
15	(Russia) Ekaterina Makarova	7	6^{3}	3

==== Seventh qualifier ====
First round
7	(Switzerland) Stefanie Vögele	6	2	6
WC	(Spain) Georgina García Pérez	4	6	2
(Australia) Anastasia Rodionova	6	6
10	(Czech Republic) Barbora Záhlavová-Strýcová	0	2

Qualifying competition
7	(Switzerland) Stefanie Vögele	6	7^{7}
(Australia) Anastasia Rodionova	4	6^{3}

==== Eighth qualifier ====
First round
8	(Belgium) Kirsten Flipkens	7	6
(United States) Jill Craybas	5	3
(Croatia) Karolina Šprem	4	6	6
11	(United States) Vania King	6	3	3

Qualifying competition
8	(Belgium) Kirsten Flipkens	6	6
(Croatia) Karolina Šprem	3	2
