= 2010 Sony Ericsson Open – Women's doubles =

Women's doubles
- 2010 Sony Ericsson Open

Final
- Champions: (Argentina) Gisela Dulko (Italy) Flavia Pennetta
- Runners-up: (Russia) Nadia Petrova (Australia) Samantha Stosur
- Score: 6–3, 4–6, [10–7]

Events
Singles	men	women
Doubles	men	women
← 2009 ·	Sony Ericsson Open	· 2011 →

Svetlana Kuznetsova and Amélie Mauresmo were the defending champions, but Mauresmo retired from the sport on December 3, 2009.
Kuznetsova chose to compete with Alicia Molik, but they lost in the first round to Gisela Dulko and Flavia Pennetta.
The unseeded pair Gisela Dulko and Flavia Pennetta won in the final 6–3, 4–6, [10–7], against Nadia Petrova and Samantha Stosur.

== Seeds ==
1. (Zimbabwe) Cara Black / (United States) Liezel Huber (first round)
2. (Spain) Nuria Llagostera Vives / (Spain) María José Martínez Sánchez (second round)
3. (Russia) Nadia Petrova / (Australia) Samantha Stosur (finals)
4. (United States) Lisa Raymond / (Australia) Rennae Stubbs (semifinals)
5. (Russia) Alisa Kleybanova / (Italy) Francesca Schiavone (quarterfinals)
6. (United States) Bethanie Mattek-Sands / (China) Yan Zi (first round)
7. (Chinese Taipei) Chuang Chia-jung / (Chinese Taipei) Hsieh Su-wei (first round)
8. (Russia) Ekaterina Makarova / (China) Peng Shuai (quarterfinals)

== Draw ==
=== Key ===
- Q = Qualifier
- WC = Wild card
- LL = Lucky loser
- Alt = Alternate
- SE = Special exempt
- PR = Protected ranking
- ITF = ITF entry
- JE = Junior exempt
- w/o = Walkover
- r = Retired
- d = Defaulted
- SR = Special ranking

=== Finals ===
Semifinals
(Chinese Taipei) Chan Yung-jan (China) Zheng Jie	1	5
3	(Russia) Nadia Petrova (Australia) Samantha Stosur	6	7
4	(United States) Lisa Raymond (Australia) Rennae Stubbs	4	4
(Argentina) Gisela Dulko (Italy) Flavia Pennetta	6	6

Final
3	(Russia) Nadia Petrova (Australia) Samantha Stosur	3	6	[7]
(Argentina) Gisela Dulko (Italy) Flavia Pennetta	6	4	[10]

=== Top half ===
First round
1	(Zimbabwe) C Black (United States) L Huber	6	4	[7]
(South Africa) N Grandin (United States) A Spears	3	6	[10]
(Uzbekistan) A Amanmuradova (Belarus) D Kustova	3	6^{5}
(Chinese Taipei) Y-j Chan (China) J Zheng	6	7
(Italy) T Garbin (Spain) V Ruano Pascual	2	0
(Czech Republic) K Peschke (Slovenia) K Srebotnik	6	6
ALT	(Turkey) İ Şenoğlu (Kazakhstan) Y Shvedova	0	1
8	(Russia) E Makarova (China) S Peng	6	6
3	(Russia) N Petrova (Australia) S Stosur	6	6
(Italy) S Errani (Israel) S Pe'er	1	2
(Belarus) O Govortsova (Russia) A Kudryavtseva	4	6	[13]
(Belarus) T Poutchek (Poland) A Rosolska	6	4	[11]
(Ukraine) A Bondarenko (Kazakhstan) G Voskoboeva	7	4	[8]
(France) J Coin (United States) V King	5	6	[10]
(Poland) K Jans (Czech Republic) V Uhlířová	0	7	[10]
7	(Chinese Taipei) C-j Chuang (Chinese Taipei) S-w Hsieh	6	6^{5}	[8]

Second round
(South Africa) N Grandin (United States) A Spears	4	6	[9]
(Chinese Taipei) Y-j Chan (China) J Zheng	6	4	[11]
(Czech Republic) K Peschke (Slovenia) K Srebotnik	4	3
8	(Russia) E Makarova (China) S Peng	6	6
3	(Russia) N Petrova (Australia) S Stosur	6	7
(Belarus) O Govortsova (Russia) A Kudryavtseva	0	5
(France) J Coin (United States) V King	6	6
(Poland) K Jans (Czech Republic) V Uhlířová	4	2

Quarterfinals
(Chinese Taipei) Y-j Chan (China) J Zheng	6	6
8	(Russia) E Makarova (China) S Peng	3	2
3	(Russia) N Petrova (Australia) S Stosur	6	6
(France) J Coin (United States) V King	3	2

Semifinals
(Chinese Taipei) Y-j Chan (China) J Zheng	1	5
3	(Russia) N Petrova (Australia) S Stosur	6	7

=== Bottom half ===
First round
5	(Russia) A Kleybanova (Italy) F Schiavone	7	6
(Czech Republic) I Benešová (Czech Republic) B Záhlavová-Strýcová	5	3
WC	(Belgium) Y Wickmayer (Russia) V Zvonareva	5	1
(Romania) M Niculescu (Russia) E Vesnina	7	6
(Latvia) L Dekmeijere (Switzerland) P Schnyder	6	3	[10]
(Russia) V Dushevina (Australia) A Rodionova	3	6	[5]
ALT	(Germany) J Görges (Canada) MÈ Pelletier	7	3	[5]
4	(United States) L Raymond (Australia) R Stubbs	5	6	[10]
6	(United States) B Mattek-Sands (China) Z Yan	2	4
(Russia) M Kirilenko (Poland) A Radwańska	6	6
WC	(Belgium) K Clijsters (Belgium) K Flipkens	7	6
(United Kingdom) S Borwell (United States) R Kops-Jones	6^{6}	4
(Argentina) G Dulko (Italy) F Pennetta	6	6
WC	(Russia) S Kuznetsova (Australia) A Molik	4	1
(Czech Republic) A Hlaváčková (Czech Republic) L Hradecká	5	4
2	(Spain) N Llagostera Vives (Spain) MJ Martínez Sánchez	7	6

Second round
5	(Russia) A Kleybanova (Italy) F Schiavone	7	7
(Romania) M Niculescu (Russia) E Vesnina	6^{4}	5
(Latvia) L Dekmeijere (Switzerland) P Schnyder	6	5	[7]
4	(United States) L Raymond (Australia) R Stubbs	2	7	[10]
(Russia) M Kirilenko (Poland) A Radwańska	6	7
WC	(Belgium) K Clijsters (Belgium) K Flipkens	2	5
(Argentina) G Dulko (Italy) F Pennetta	4	6	[10]
2	(Spain) N Llagostera Vives (Spain) MJ Martínez Sánchez	6	3	[7]

Quarterfinals
5	(Russia) A Kleybanova (Italy) F Schiavone	4	3
4	(United States) L Raymond (Australia) R Stubbs	6	6
(Russia) M Kirilenko (Poland) A Radwańska	3	5
(Argentina) G Dulko (Italy) F Pennetta	6	7

Semifinals
4	(United States) L Raymond (Australia) R Stubbs	4	4
(Argentina) G Dulko (Italy) F Pennetta	6	6
