= 2010 Mutua Madrileña Madrid Open – Women's doubles =

Women's doubles
- 2010 Mutua Madrileña Madrid Open

Final
- Champion: (United States) Serena Williams; (United States) Venus Williams
- Runner-up: (Argentina) Gisela Dulko; (Italy) Flavia Pennetta
- Score: 6–2, 7–5

Events
Singles	men	women
Doubles	men	women
← 2009 ·	Mutua Madrileña Madrid Open	· 2011 →

Cara Black and Liezel Huber were the defending champions, but they chose not to compete together.
Black partnered up with Elena Vesnina, but they lost to Chan Yung-jan and Zheng Jie in the first round.
Huber teamed with Anabel Medina Garrigues, but they lost to Chuang Chia-jung and Vania King in the second round.
Venus and Serena Williams won in the final 6–2, 7–5 against Gisela Dulko and Flavia Pennetta.

== Seeds ==
The top four seeds received a bye into the second round.

1. (United States) Serena Williams / (United States) Venus Williams (champions)
2. (Spain) Nuria Llagostera Vives / (Spain) María José Martínez Sánchez (semifinals)
3. (Russia) Nadia Petrova / (Australia) Samantha Stosur (second round)
4. (United States) Liezel Huber / (Spain) Anabel Medina Garrigues (second round)
5. (Zimbabwe) Cara Black / (Russia) Elena Vesnina (first round)
6. (United States) Lisa Raymond / (Australia) Rennae Stubbs (second round)
7. (United States) Bethanie Mattek-Sands / (China) Yan Zi (second round)
8. (Argentina) Gisela Dulko / (Italy) Flavia Pennetta (final)

== Draw ==
=== Key ===
- Q = Qualifier
- WC = Wild card
- LL = Lucky loser
- Alt = Alternate
- SE = Special exempt
- PR = Protected ranking
- ITF = ITF entry
- JE = Junior exempt
- w/o = Walkover
- r = Retired
- d = Defaulted
- SR = Special ranking

=== Finals ===
Semifinals

Final

1
- (United States) Serena Williams
- (United States) Venus Williams
7
6

- (Israel) Shahar Pe'er
- (Italy) Francesca Schiavone
5
2

1
- (United States) Serena Williams
- (United States) Venus Williams
6
7

8
- (Argentina) Gisela Dulko
- (Italy) Flavia Pennetta
2
5

8
- (Argentina) Gisela Dulko
- (Italy) Flavia Pennetta
6
6

2
- (Spain) Nuria Llagostera Vives
- (Spain) María José Martínez Sánchez
2
4

=== Top half ===
First round

Second round

Quarterfinals

Semifinals

1
- (United States) S Williams
- (United States) V Williams
7
6

- (Romania) S Cîrstea
- (China) S Peng
0
3

- (Poland) A Rosolska
- (Kazakhstan) Y Shvedova
6^{4}
2

- (Poland) A Rosolska
- (Kazakhstan) Y Shvedova
6
6

1
- (United States) S Williams
- (United States) V Williams
6
6

- (Russia) V Dushevina
- (Russia) E Makarova
3
2

- (Russia) M Kirilenko
- (Poland) A Radwańska
2
4

- (Russia) M Kirilenko
- (Poland) A Radwańska
6
6

- (Russia) M Kirilenko
- (Poland) A Radwańska
7
3
[10]

- (Chinese Taipei) Y-j Chan
- (China) J Zheng
6
7

- (Chinese Taipei) Y-j Chan
- (China) J Zheng
6^{2}
6
[7]

5
- (Zimbabwe) C Black
- (Russia) E Vesnina
0
6^{6}

1
(United States) S Williams
(United States) V Williams
7
6

- (Israel) S Pe'er
- (Italy) F Schiavone
5
2

4
- (United States) L Huber
- (Spain) A Medina Garrigues
2
6
[9]

- (Italy) S Errani
- (Italy) R Vinci
0
4

- (Chinese Taipei) C-j Chuang
- (United States) V King
6
2
[11]

- (Chinese Taipei) C-j Chuang
- (United States) V King
6
6

- (Chinese Taipei) C-j Chuang
- (United States) V King
6^{3}
3

- (Italy) T Garbin
- (United States) R Kops-Jones
1
2

- (Israel) S Pe'er
- (Italy) F Schiavone
7
6

- (Israel) S Pe'er
- (Italy) F Schiavone
6
6

- (Israel) S Pe'er
- (Italy) F Schiavone
6
6

WC
- (Spain) L Domínguez Lino
- (Spain) A Parra Santonja
2
4

6
- (United States) L Raymond
- (Australia) R Stubbs
0
2

6
- (United States) L Raymond
- (Australia) R Stubbs
6
6

=== Bottom half ===
First round

Second round

Quarterfinals

Semifinals

8
- (Argentina) G Dulko
- (Italy) F Pennetta
6
7

- (Czech Republic) K Peschke
- (Slovenia) K Srebotnik
3
6^{3}

8
- (Argentina) G Dulko
- (Italy) F Pennetta
w/o

WC
- (Russia) D Safina
- (Hungary) Á Szávay
2
6
[10]

WC
- (Russia) D Safina
- (Hungary) Á Szávay

- (Uzbekistan) A Amanmuradova
- (Chinese Taipei) S-w Hsieh
6
3
[8]

8
- (Argentina) G Dulko
- (Italy) F Pennetta
6
7

- (Belarus) O Govortsova
- (Russia) A Kudryavtseva
6
6^{1}
[5]

- (Australia) A Rodionova
- (Switzerland) P Schnyder
4
5

- (Australia) A Rodionova
- (Switzerland) P Schnyder
1
7
[10]

- (Australia) A Rodionova
- (Switzerland) P Schnyder
4
6
[10]

3
- (Russia) N Petrova
- (Australia) S Stosur
6
4
[6]

8
- (Argentina) G Dulko
- (Italy) F Pennetta
6
6

7
- (United States) B Mattek-Sands
- (China) Z Yan
6^{6}
6
[10]

2
- (Spain) N Llagostera Vives
- (Spain) M J Martínez Sánchez
2
4

- (Czech Republic) I Benešová
- (Czech Republic) B Záhlavová-Strýcová
7
2
[1]

7
- (United States) B Mattek-Sands
- (China) Z Yan
7
3
[8]

- (Spain) V Ruano Pascual
- (United States) M Shaughnessy
6
7

(Spain) V Ruano Pascual
(United States) M Shaughnessy
6^{5}
6
[10]

WC
- (Spain) B García Vidagany
- (Spain) S Soler Espinosa
3
6^{6}

- (Spain) V Ruano Pascual
- (United States) M Shaughnessy
3
7
[7]

- (South Africa) N Grandin
- (United States) A Spears
4
4

2
- (Spain) N Llagostera Vives
- (Spain) M J Martínez Sánchezx`
6
6^{6}
[10]

- (Latvia) L Dekmeijere
- (Russia) A Kleybanova
6
6

- (Latvia) L Dekmeijere
- (Russia) A Kleybanova
0
2

2
- (Spain) N Llagostera Vives
- (Spain) M J Martínez Sánchez
6
6
