= 2012 Sony Ericsson Open – Women's singles =

Women's singles
- 2012 Sony Ericsson Open

Final
- Champion: (Poland) Agnieszka Radwańska
- Runner-up: (Russia) Maria Sharapova
- Score: 7–5, 6–4

Details
- Draw: 96
- Seeds: 32

Events
| Singles | men | women |
| Doubles | men | women |
- Sony Ericsson Open

Agnieszka Radwańska defeated Maria Sharapova in the final, 7–5, 6–4 to win the women's singles tennis title at the 2012 Miami Open. It was her second Premier Mandatory title and first Miami Masters title. Radwańska did not drop a set during the tournament.

Victoria Azarenka was the defending champion, but lost to Marion Bartoli in the quarterfinals, ending Azarenka's 26-match winning streak to start the 2012 season.

This tournament also marked the first WTA Tour main draw appearance of two-time major champion and future world No. 1, Garbiñe Muguruza, where she made the fourth round before losing to Radwańska.

== Seeds ==
All seeds received a bye into the second round.

1. (Belarus) Victoria Azarenka (quarterfinals)
2. (Russia) Maria Sharapova (final)
3. (Czech Republic) Petra Kvitová (second round)
4. (Denmark) Caroline Wozniacki (semifinals)
5. (Poland) Agnieszka Radwańska (champion)
6. (Australia) Samantha Stosur (fourth round)
7. (France) Marion Bartoli (semifinals)
8. (China) Li Na (quarterfinals)
9. (Russia) Vera Zvonareva (second round)
10. (United States) Serena Williams (quarterfinals)
11. (Italy) Francesca Schiavone (second round)
12. (Germany) Sabine Lisicki (fourth round)
13. (Serbia) Jelena Janković (second round)
14. (Germany) Julia Görges (second round)
15. (Serbia) Ana Ivanovic (fourth round)
16. (Slovakia) Dominika Cibulková (fourth round)
17. (China) Peng Shuai (third round)
18. (Germany) Angelique Kerber (second round)
19. (Russia) Anastasia Pavlyuchenkova (second round)
20. (Slovakia) Daniela Hantuchová (third round)
21. (Italy) Roberta Vinci (third round)
22. (Russia) Maria Kirilenko (fourth round)
23. (Belgium) Yanina Wickmayer (fourth round)
24. (Italy) Flavia Pennetta (third round)
25. (Spain) Anabel Medina Garrigues (second round)
26. (Russia) Svetlana Kuznetsova (second round)
27. (Czech Republic) Lucie Šafářová (second round)
28. (Romania) Monica Niculescu (second round)
29. (Czech Republic) Petra Cetkovská (third round)
30. (Italy) Sara Errani (second round)
31. (Estonia) Kaia Kanepi (second round)
32. (Russia) Nadia Petrova (second round)

Click on the seed number of a player to go to their draw section.

== Draw ==
Key

- Q = Qualifier
- WC = Wild card
- LL = Lucky loser
- Alt = Alternate
- ITF = ITF entry
- PR = Protected ranking
- SR = Special ranking
- SE = Special exempt
- JE = Junior exempt
- JR = Junior Accelerator Programme entrant
- CO = College Accelerator Programme entrant
- NG = Next Gen Accelerator Program entrant
- w/o = Walkover
- r = Retired
- d = Defaulted

=== Finals ===
Quarterfinals
1 | (Belarus) Victoria Azarenka | 3 | 3
7 | (France) Marion Bartoli | 6 | 6
WC | (United States) Venus Williams | 4 | 1
5 | (Poland) Agnieszka Radwańska | 6 | 6
10 | (United States) Serena Williams | 4 | 4
4 | (Denmark) Caroline Wozniacki | 6 | 6
8 | (China) Li Na | 3 | 0
2 | (Russia) Maria Sharapova | 6 | 6

Semifinals
7 | (France) Marion Bartoli | 4 | 2
5 | (Poland) Agnieszka Radwańska | 6 | 6
4 | (Denmark) Caroline Wozniacki | 6 | 2 | 4
2 | (Russia) Maria Sharapova | 4 | 6 | 6

Final
5 | (Poland) Agnieszka Radwańska | 7 | 6
2 | (Russia) Maria Sharapova | 5 | 4

=== Top half ===
==== Section 1 ====
First round
Q | (Czech Republic) E Birnerová | 7 | 4 | 0
(Netherlands) M Krajicek | 5 | 6 | 6
WC | (United Kingdom) H Watson | 6 | 3 | 7^{7}
(Romania) S Cîrstea | 3 | 6 | 6^{4}
(China) J Zheng | 6 | 6
(Czech Republic) L Hradecká | 1 | 4
(Georgia (country)) A Tatishvili | 6 | 4
(Austria) T Paszek | 4 | 3^{r}

Second round
1 | (Belarus) V Azarenka | 6 | 7
(Netherlands) M Krajicek | 3 | 5
WC | (United Kingdom) H Watson | 6 | 6
27 | (Czech Republic) L Šafářová | 2 | 1
18 | (Germany) A Kerber | 6^{4} | 1
(China) J Zheng | 7^{7} | 6
(Georgia (country)) A Tatishvili | 5 | 1
16 | (Slovakia) D Cibulková | 7 | 6

Third round
1 | (Belarus) V Azarenka | 6 | 6
WC | (United Kingdom) H Watson | 0 | 2
(China) J Zheng | 2 | 0
16 | (Slovakia) D Cibulková | 6 | 6

Fourth round
1 | (Belarus) V Azarenka | 1 | 7^{9} | 7
16 | (Slovakia) D Cibulková | 6 | 6^{7} | 5

==== Section 2 ====
First round
(Belarus) A Yakimova | 4 | 0
(Kazakhstan) K Pervak | 6 | 6
WC | (Russia) A Kleybanova | 2 | 6 | 6
(Sweden) J Larsson | 6 | 3 | 2
(Romania) S Halep | 6^{5} | 6 | 6
(Spain) C Suárez Navarro | 7^{7} | 3 | 3
Q | (United States) J Hampton | 1 | 3
(Slovenia) P Hercog | 6 | 6

Second round
11 | (Italy) F Schiavone | 4 | 6 | 5
(Kazakhstan) K Pervak | 6 | 4 | 7
WC | (Russia) A Kleybanova | 6^{1} | 3
22 | (Russia) M Kirilenko | 7^{7} | 6
32 | (Russia) N Petrova | 3 | 2
(Romania) S Halep | 6 | 6
(Slovenia) P Hercog | 7 | 2 | 1
7 | (France) M Bartoli | 5 | 6 | 6

Third round
(Kazakhstan) K Pervak | 2 | 1
22 | (Russia) M Kirilenko | 6 | 6
(Romania) S Halep | 4 | 6^{6}
7 | (France) M Bartoli | 6 | 7^{8}

Fourth round
22 | (Russia) M Kirilenko | 1 | 2
7 | (France) M Bartoli | 6 | 6

==== Section 3 ====
First round
WC | (United States) V Williams | 6 | 6
(Japan) K Date-Krumm | 0 | 3
WC | (Canada) A Wozniak | 4 | 6 | 6
(Greece) E Daniilidou | 6 | 3 | 0
Q | (Poland) U Radwańska | 6 | 6^{5} | 4
Q | (Ukraine) K Bondarenko | 3 | 7^{7} | 6
(United States) V King | 6 | 7^{14}
(Spain) L Pous Tió | 2 | 6^{12}

Second round
3 | (Czech Republic) P Kvitová | 4 | 6 | 0
WC | (United States) V Williams | 6 | 4 | 6
WC | (Canada) A Wozniak | 4 | 6 | 6
28 | (Romania) M Niculescu | 6 | 3 | 4
20 | (Slovakia) D Hantuchová | 6^{4} | 6 | 7^{7}
Q | (Ukraine) K Bondarenko | 7^{7} | 2 | 6^{4}
(United States) V King | 4 | 5
15 | (Serbia) A Ivanovic | 6 | 7

Third round
WC | (United States) V Williams | 4 | 6 | 7^{7}
WC | (Canada) A Wozniak | 6 | 4 | 6^{5}
20 | (Slovakia) D Hantuchová | 2 | 6^{2}
15 | (Serbia) A Ivanovic | 6 | 7^{7}

Fourth round
WC | (United States) V Williams | 6^{4} | 6 | 6
15 | (Serbia) A Ivanovic | 7^{7} | 2 | 2

==== Section 4 ====
First round
(Japan) A Morita | 3 | 6 | 0^{r}
WC | (Spain) G Muguruza Blanco | 6 | 2 | 3
(Spain) L Domínguez Lino | 6 | 6
WC | (Serbia) B Jovanovski | 3 | 3
Q | (Japan) M Doi | 3 | 4
(Spain) S Soler Espinosa | 6 | 6
(Slovakia) M Rybáriková | 7^{7} | 2 | 1
Q | (United States) M Keys | 6^{4} | 6 | 6

Second round
9 | (Russia) V Zvonareva | 4 | 3
WC | (Spain) G Muguruza Blanco | 6 | 6
(Spain) L Domínguez Lino | 4 | 6 | 0
24 | (Italy) F Pennetta | 6 | 2 | 6
31 | (Estonia) K Kanepi | 5 | 3
(Spain) S Soler Espinosa | 7 | 6
Q | (United States) M Keys | 1 | 1
5 | (Poland) A Radwańska | 6 | 6

Third round
WC | (Spain) G Muguruza Blanco | 6 | 1 | 7^{8}
24 | (Italy) F Pennetta | 2 | 6 | 6^{6}
(Spain) S Soler Espinosa | 1 | 2
5 | (Poland) A Radwańska | 6 | 6

Fourth round
WC | (Spain) G Muguruza Blanco | 3 | 2
5 | (Poland) A Radwańska | 6 | 6

=== Bottom half ===
==== Section 5 ====
First round
(Czech Republic) K Zakopalová | 3 | 5
Q | (Russia) V Savinykh | 6 | 7
(South Africa) C Scheepers | 3 | 6 | 6
(Romania) I-C Begu | 6 | 3 | 0
(Bulgaria) T Pironkova | 6 | 6
(Croatia) P Martić | 3 | 2
WC | (China) S Zhang | 6^{5} | 6 | 6
(United Kingdom) E Baltacha | 7^{7} | 3 | 2

Second round
6 | (Australia) S Stosur | 6 | 6
Q | (Russia) V Savinykh | 4 | 0
(South Africa) C Scheepers | 1 | 6 | 6
25 | (Spain) A Medina Garrigues | 6 | 4 | 0
21 | (Italy) R Vinci | 7 | 6
(Bulgaria) T Pironkova | 5 | 1
WC | (China) S Zhang | 2 | 3
10 | (United States) S Williams | 6 | 6

Third round
6 | (Australia) S Stosur | 2 | 7 | 6
(South Africa) C Scheepers | 6 | 5 | 2
21 | (Italy) R Vinci | 2 | 1
10 | (United States) S Williams | 6 | 6

Fourth round
6 | (Australia) S Stosur | 5 | 3
10 | (United States) S Williams | 7 | 6

==== Section 6 ====
First round
(Australia) J Gajdošová | 6 | 1 | 0
(Belgium) K Clijsters | 4 | 6 | 6
(New Zealand) M Erakovic | 4 | 6 | 6
(France) M Johansson | 6 | 4 | 4
(Kazakhstan) G Voskoboeva | 3 | 4
(United States) C McHale | 6 | 6
Q | (Russia) V Dushevina | 6^{3} | 4
(Czech Republic) B Záhlavová-Strýcová | 7^{7} | 6

Second round
14 | (Germany) J Görges | 2 | 5
(Belgium) K Clijsters | 6 | 7
(New Zealand) M Erakovic | 3 | 4
23 | (Belgium) Y Wickmayer | 6 | 6
29 | (Czech Republic) P Cetkovská | 0 | 7 | 6
(United States) C McHale | 6 | 5 | 1
(Czech Republic) B Záhlavová-Strýcová | 4 | 0
4 | (Denmark) C Wozniacki | 6 | 6

Third round
(Belgium) K Clijsters | 4 | 6^{5}
23 | (Belgium) Y Wickmayer | 6 | 7^{7}
29 | (Czech Republic) P Cetkovská | 3 | 5
4 | (Denmark) C Wozniacki | 6 | 7

Fourth round
23 | (Belgium) Y Wickmayer | 6^{6} | 0
4 | (Denmark) C Wozniacki | 7^{8} | 6

==== Section 7 ====
First round
(Italy) A Brianti | 1 | 2
Q | (Hungary) M Czink | 6 | 6
(Russia) E Vesnina | 6^{5} | 1
(Czech Republic) I Benešová | 7^{7} | 6
WC | (Australia) O Rogowska | 4 | 1
Q | (France) S Foretz Gacon | 6 | 6
(Argentina) G Dulko | 4 | 5
(Sweden) S Arvidsson | 6 | 7

Second round
8 | (China) N Li | 7 | 6
Q | (Hungary) M Czink | 5 | 2
(Czech Republic) I Benešová | 1 | 7^{9} | 7^{9}
26 | (Russia) S Kuznetsova | 6 | 6^{7} | 6^{7}
17 | (China) S Peng | 6 | 6
Q | (France) S Foretz Gacon | 1 | 2
(Sweden) S Arvidsson | 3 | 2
12 | (Germany) S Lisicki | 6 | 6

Third round
8 | (China) N Li | 7 | 6
(Czech Republic) I Benešová | 5 | 2
17 | (China) S Peng | 4 | 5
12 | (Germany) S Lisicki | 6 | 7

Fourth round
8 | (China) N Li | 3 | 6 | 6
12 | (Germany) S Lisicki | 6 | 4 | 2

==== Section 8 ====
First round
(Germany) M Barthel | 6 | 6
(Hungary) G Arn | 1 | 0
(Russia) E Makarova | 6 | 7
(Australia) J Dokić | 1 | 5
(France) P Parmentier | 6 | 6^{4} | 4
Q | (United States) S Stephens | 4 | 7^{7} | 6
(Israel) S Pe'er | 6 | 6
Q | (France) A Cornet | 4 | 2

Second round
13 | (Serbia) J Janković | 0 | 3
(Germany) M Barthel | 6 | 6
(Russia) E Makarova | 6 | 6
19 | (Russia) A Pavlyuchenkova | 1 | 2
30 | (Italy) S Errani | 6 | 2 | 5
Q | (United States) S Stephens | 3 | 6 | 7
(Israel) S Pe'er | 6 | 3 | 3
2 | (Russia) M Sharapova | 4 | 6 | 6

Third round
(Germany) M Barthel | 2 | 4
(Russia) E Makarova | 6 | 6
Q | (United States) S Stephens | 4 | 2
2 | (Russia) M Sharapova | 6 | 6

Fourth round
(Russia) E Makarova | 4 | 6^{3}
2 | (Russia) M Sharapova | 6 | 7^{7}

== Qualifying ==
=== Seeds ===
1. (Ukraine) Kateryna Bondarenko (qualified)
2. (United Kingdom) Anne Keothavong (first round)
3. (Chinese Taipei) Hsieh Su-wei (qualifying competition)
4. (Russia) Vera Dushevina (qualified)
5. (United States) Varvara Lepchenko (qualifying competition)
6. (Russia) Alexandra Panova (first round)
7. (Poland) Urszula Radwańska (qualified)
8. (Belarus) Olga Govortsova (first round)
9. (France) Stéphanie Foretz Gacon (qualified)
10. (United States) Sloane Stephens (qualified)
11. (Canada) Stéphanie Dubois (first round)
12. (Luxembourg) Mandy Minella (qualifying competition)
13. (Austria) Patricia Mayr-Achleitner (first round)
14. (Romania) Edina Gallovits-Hall (first round)
15. (Russia) Nina Bratchikova (first round)
16. (Netherlands) Arantxa Rus (qualifying competition)
17. (United States) Jamie Hampton (qualified)
18. (United States) Irina Falconi (first round)
19. (Australia) Anastasia Rodionova (qualifying competition)
20. (Chinese Taipei) Chang Kai-chen (first round, retired)
21. (Spain) Lara Arruabarrena Vecino (first round)
22. (Czech Republic) Eva Birnerová (qualified)
23. (Russia) Alla Kudryavtseva (first round)
24. (Russia) Valeria Savinykh (qualified)

=== Qualifiers ===
1. (Ukraine) Kateryna Bondarenko
2. (Japan) Misaki Doi
3. (France) Alizé Cornet
4. (Russia) Vera Dushevina
5. (Russia) Valeria Savinykh
6. (Hungary) Melinda Czink
7. (Poland) Urszula Radwańska
8. (United States) Madison Keys
9. (France) Stéphanie Foretz Gacon
10. (United States) Sloane Stephens
11. (Czech Republic) Eva Birnerová
12. (United States) Jamie Hampton

=== Draw ===
Key

- Q = Qualifier
- WC = Wild card
- LL = Lucky loser
- Alt = Alternate
- ITF = ITF entry
- PR = Protected ranking
- SR = Special ranking
- SE = Special exempt
- JE = Junior exempt
- JR = Junior Accelerator Programme entrant
- CO = College Accelerator Programme entrant
- NG = Next Gen Accelerator Program entrant
- w/o = Walkover
- r = Retired
- d = Defaulted

==== First qualifier ====
First round
1 | (Ukraine) Kateryna Bondarenko | 6 | 6
WC | (United Kingdom) Naomi Broady | 3 | 0
(Croatia) Mirjana Lučić | 6 | 7^{8}
21 | (Spain) Lara Arruabarrena Vecino | 4 | 6^{6}

Qualifying competition
1 | (Ukraine) Kateryna Bondarenko | 4 | 6 | 6
(Croatia) Mirjana Lučić | 6 | 2 | 4

==== Second qualifier ====
First round
2 | (United Kingdom) Anne Keothavong | 4 | 3
(Japan) Misaki Doi | 6 | 6
WC | (France) Caroline Garcia | 6 | 3 | 1
16 | (Netherlands) Arantxa Rus | 2 | 6 | 6

Qualifying competition
(Japan) Misaki Doi | 7^{7} | 6
16 | (Netherlands) Arantxa Rus | 6^{4} | 2

==== Third qualifier ====
First round
3 | (Chinese Taipei) Hsieh Su-wei | 7 | 2 | 6
(Uzbekistan) Akgul Amanmuradova | 5 | 6 | 1
(France) Alizé Cornet | 6 | 6
15 | (Russia) Nina Bratchikova | 2 | 3

Qualifying competition
3 | (Chinese Taipei) Hsieh Su-wei | 3 | 7 | 4
(France) Alizé Cornet | 6 | 5 | 6

==== Fourth qualifier ====
First round
4 | (Russia) Vera Dushevina | 6 | 6
WC | (United States) Lauren Davis | 3 | 1
(Chinese Taipei) Chan Yung-jan | 6 | 6
23 | (Russia) Alla Kudryavtseva | 1 | 4

Qualifying competition
4 | (Russia) Vera Dushevina | 6 | 6
(Chinese Taipei) Chan Yung-jan | 3 | 3

==== Fifth qualifier ====
First round
5 | (United States) Varvara Lepchenko | 7 | 6^{7} | 6
(United States) Alison Riske | 5 | 7^{9} | 2
(Switzerland) Stefanie Vögele | 5 | 1^{r}
24 | (Russia) Valeria Savinykh | 7 | 3

Qualifying competition
5 | (United States) Varvara Lepchenko | 3 | 2
24 | (Russia) Valeria Savinykh | 6 | 6

==== Sixth qualifier ====
First round
6 | (Russia) Alexandra Panova | 3 | 6^{3}
(United Kingdom) Laura Robson | 6 | 7^{7}
(Hungary) Melinda Czink | 6 | 6
13 | (Austria) Patricia Mayr-Achleitner | 4 | 4

Qualifying competition
(United Kingdom) Laura Robson | 6^{4} | 2
(Hungary) Melinda Czink | 7^{7} | 6

==== Seventh qualifier ====
First round
7 | (Poland) Urszula Radwańska | 3 | 6 | 6
(Russia) Evgeniya Rodina | 6 | 1 | 2
(Czech Republic) Andrea Hlaváčková | 6 | 0
20 | (Chinese Taipei) Chang Kai-chen | 2 | 1^{r}

Qualifying competition
7 | (Poland) Urszula Radwańska | 4 | 7 | 6
(Czech Republic) Andrea Hlaváčková | 6 | 5 | 1

==== Eighth qualifier ====
First round
8 | (Belarus) Olga Govortsova | 3 | 7 | 4
WC | (United States) Madison Keys | 6 | 5 | 6
(Ukraine) Lesia Tsurenko | 2 | 4
19 | (Australia) Anastasia Rodionova | 6 | 6

Qualifying competition
WC | (United States) Madison Keys | 2 | 6 | 6
19 | (Australia) Anastasia Rodionova | 6 | 1 | 4

==== Ninth qualifier ====
First round
9 | (France) Stéphanie Foretz Gacon | 6 | 3 | 7^{7}
(Austria) Yvonne Meusburger | 2 | 6 | 6^{2}
(France) Aravane Rezaï | 6 | 3 | 7
14 | (Romania) Edina Gallovits-Hall | 2 | 6 | 5

Qualifying competition
9 | (France) Stéphanie Foretz Gacon | 6 | 6
(France) Aravane Rezaï | 4 | 3

==== Tenth qualifier ====
First round
10 | (United States) Sloane Stephens | 6 | 6
WC | (Netherlands) Indy de Vroome | 1 | 3
(India) Sania Mirza | 7^{7} | 6
18 | (United States) Irina Falconi | 6^{4} | 0

Qualifying competition
10 | (United States) Sloane Stephens | 6 | 6
(India) Sania Mirza | 2 | 4

==== Eleventh qualifier ====
First round
11 | (Canada) Stéphanie Dubois | 6 | 4 | 0
WC | (Russia) Anastasia Pivovarova | 4 | 6 | 6
(Germany) Kristina Barrois | 2 | 6 | 5
22 | (Czech Republic) Eva Birnerová | 6 | 2 | 7

Qualifying competition
WC | (Russia) Anastasia Pivovarova | 4 | 3
22 | (Czech Republic) Eva Birnerová | 6 | 6

==== Twelfth qualifier ====
First round
12 | (Luxembourg) Mandy Minella | 6 | 6
(Kazakhstan) Sesil Karatantcheva | 4 | 3
(Argentina) Paula Ormaechea | 4 | 3
17 | (United States) Jamie Hampton | 6 | 6

Qualifying competition
12 | (Luxembourg) Mandy Minella | 3 | 2
17 | (United States) Jamie Hampton | 6 | 6
