= 2014 Copa Colsanitas – Doubles =

Tennis tournament

Doubles
- 2014 Copa Colsanitas

Final
- Champions: (Spain) Lara Arruabarrena (France) Caroline Garcia
- Runners-up: (United States) Vania King (South Africa) Chanelle Scheepers
- Score: 7–6^{(7–5)}, 6–4

Details
- Draw: 16
- Seeds: 4

Events
Singles	Doubles
← 2013 ·	Copa Colsanitas	· 2015 →

Tímea Babos and Mandy Minella were the defending champions, but they decided not to participate this year.
Lara Arruabarrena and Caroline Garcia won the title, defeating Vania King and Chanelle Scheepers in the final, 7–6^{(7–5)}, 6–4.

== Seeds ==
1. (United States) Vania King / (South Africa) Chanelle Scheepers (final)
2. (Spain) Lourdes Domínguez Lino / (Spain) Arantxa Parra Santonja (semifinals)
3. (Romania) Irina-Camelia Begu / (Argentina) María Irigoyen (quarterfinals)
4. (Canada) Sharon Fichman / (Russia) Alexandra Panova (semifinals)

== Draw ==
=== Key ===
- Q = Qualifier
- WC = Wild card
- LL = Lucky loser
- Alt = Alternate
- SE = Special exempt
- PR = Protected ranking
- ITF = ITF entry
- JE = Junior exempt
- w/o = Walkover
- r = Retired
- d = Defaulted
- SR = Special ranking

=== Draw ===
First round
1	(United States) V King (South Africa) C Scheepers	1	7	[10]
WC	(Colombia) M Herazo González (Colombia) MP Pérez García	6	5	[5]
(Serbia) J Janković (Montenegro) D Kovinić	6	3	[6]
Alt	(United States) C-Y Hsu (Bulgaria) E Kostova	1	6	[10]
4	(Canada) S Fichman (Russia) A Panova	6	7^{7}
(France) A Hesse (France) K Mladenovic	0	6^{3}
WC	(Argentina) P Ormaechea (United States) S Stephens	7^{7}	5	[5]
(Venezuela) A Pérez (Brazil) L Pigossi	6^{5}	7	[10]
(United States) J Cohen (Germany) T Maria	1	2
(Spain) L Arruabarrena (France) C Garcia	6	6
(Argentina) F Molinero (Switzerland) R Oprandi	4	2
3	(Romania) I-C Begu (Argentina) M Irigoyen	6	6
Alt	(Italy) A Grymalska (Germany) C Shakovets	4	6	[10]
(United States) N Melichar (United Kingdom) N Slater	6	4	[0]
(Russia) M Melnikova (Georgia (country)) S Shapatava	6	5	[4]
2	(Spain) L Domínguez Lino (Spain) A Parra Santonja	4	7	[10]

Quarterfinals
1	(United States) V King (South Africa) C Scheepers	w/o
Alt	(United States) C-Y Hsu (Bulgaria) E Kostova
4	(Canada) S Fichman (Russia) A Panova	5	6	[10]
(Venezuela) A Pérez (Brazil) L Pigossi	7	3	[6]
(Spain) L Arruabarrena (France) C Garcia	6	6
3	(Romania) I-C Begu (Argentina) M Irigoyen	3	4
Alt	(Italy) A Grymalska (Germany) C Shakovets	2	3
2	(Spain) L Domínguez Lino (Spain) A Parra Santonja	6	6

Semifinals
1	(United States) V King (South Africa) C Scheepers	7^{7}	6
4	(Canada) S Fichman (Russia) A Panova	6^{4}	2
(Spain) L Arruabarrena (France) C Garcia	6	6
2	(Spain) L Domínguez Lino (Spain) A Parra Santonja	3	4

Final
1	(United States) V King (South Africa) C Scheepers	6^{5}	4
(Spain) L Arruabarrena (France) C Garcia	7^{7}	6
