= Jelena Janković career statistics =

Career finals
Discipline	Type	Won	Lost	Total
Singles	Grand Slam	0	1	1
Singles	Summer Olympics	–	–	–
Singles	WTA Finals (Note: Formerly known as: Virginia Slims Championships (until 1995); WTA Tour Championships (until 2014))	–	–	–
Singles	WTA Elite (Note: Elite tier: WTA Tournament of Champions (2009–14); WTA Elite Trophy (2015–present))	–	–	–
Singles	WTA 1000 (Note: Formerly known as: Category 4 & 5 & 6 (until 1990); Tier I (until 2009); WTA Premier Mandatory and 5 (until 2021))	6	7	13
Singles	WTA 500 (Note: Formerly known as: Category 3 (until 1990); Tier II (until 2009); WTA Premier (until 2021))	2	5	7
Singles	WTA 250 (Note: Formerly known as: Category 1 & 2 (until 1990); Tier III & IV & V (until 2009); WTA International (until 2021))	7	8	15
Singles	Total	15	21	36
Doubles	Grand Slam	–	–	–
Doubles	Summer Olympics	–	–	–
Doubles	WTA Finals	–	–	–
Doubles	WTA Elite	–	–	–
Doubles	WTA 1000	1	0	1
Doubles	WTA 500	–	–	–
Doubles	WTA 250	1	3	4
Doubles	Total	2	3	5
Mixed doubles	Grand Slam	1	0	1
Mixed doubles	Total	1	0	1
Total		18	24	42

This is a list of the main career statistics of Serbian professional tennis player and former world No. 1, Jelena Janković. She won 15 WTA Tour singles titles including four WTA Tier I singles titles, one Premier Mandatory singles title and one Premier 5 singles title. Janković was also the runner-up in singles at the 2008 US Open, a semifinalist at the year-ending WTA Tour Championships in 2008, 2009 and 2013 and a quarterfinalist at the 2008 Beijing Olympics.

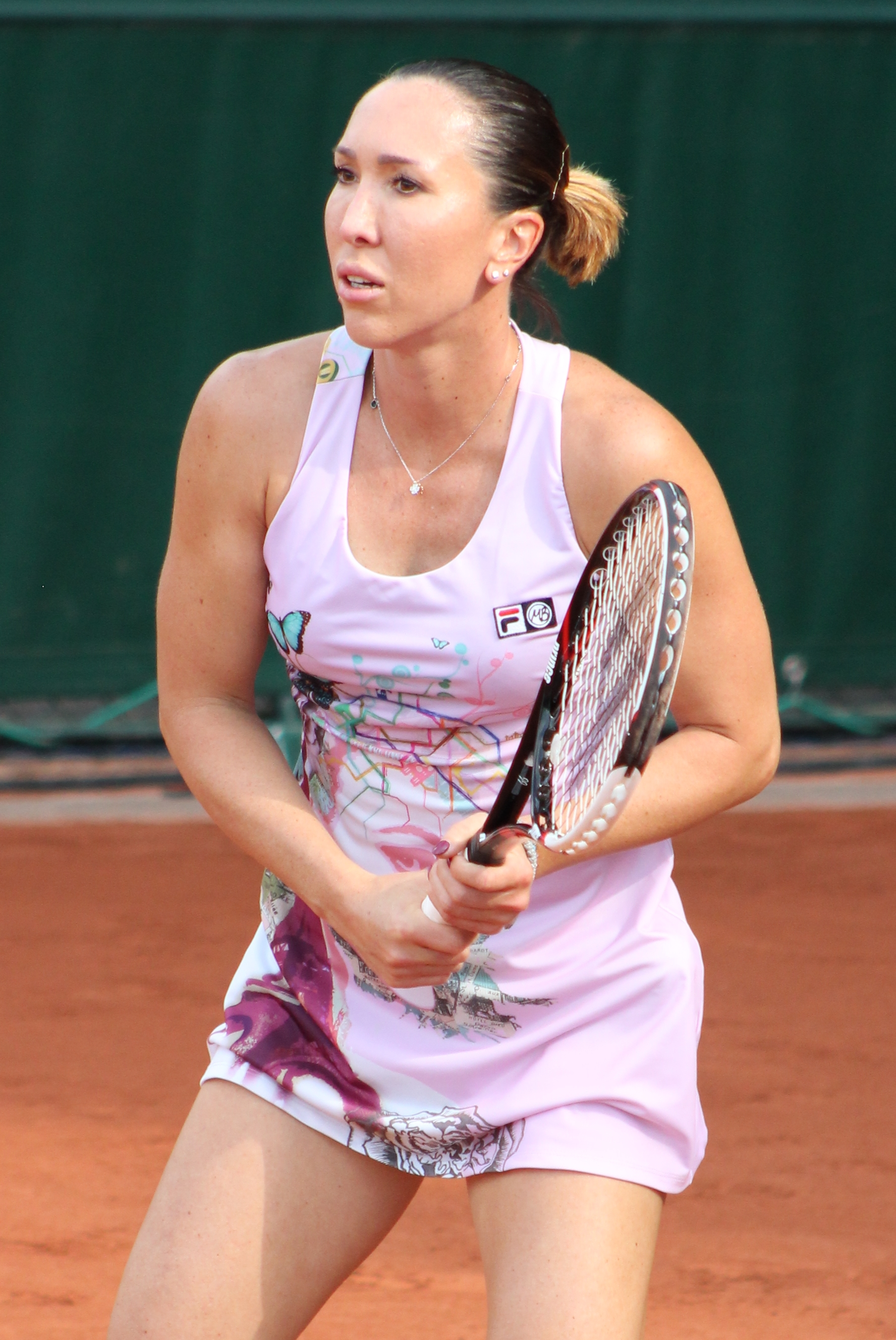
Janković at the 2016 French Open.

== Performance timelines ==
Key
W	F	SF	QF	#R	RR	Q#	P#	DNQ	A	Z#	PO	G	S	B	NMS	NTI	P	NH

(W) winner; (F) finalist; (SF) semifinalist; (QF) quarterfinalist; (#R) rounds 4, 3, 2, 1; (RR) round-robin stage; (Q#) qualification round; (P#) preliminary round; (DNQ) did not qualify; (A) absent; (Z#) Davis/Fed Cup Zonal Group (with number indication) or (PO) play-off; (G) gold, (S) silver or (B) bronze Olympic/Paralympic medal; (NMS) not a Masters tournament; (NTI) not a Tier I tournament; (P) postponed; (NH) not held; (SR) strike rate (events won / competed); (W–L) win–loss record.
To avoid confusion and double counting, these charts are updated at the conclusion of a tournament or when the player's participation has ended.

Only main-draw results in WTA Tour, Grand Slam tournaments, Billie Jean King Cup (Fed Cup), Hopman Cup and Olympic Games are included in win–loss records.

=== Singles ===
Tournament	2001	2002	2003	2004	2005	2006	2007	2008	2009	2010	2011	2012	2013	2014	2015	2016	2017	SR	W–L	Win%
Grand Slams tournaments
Australian Open	A	A	2R	2R	2R	2R	4R	SF	4R	3R	2R	4R	3R	4R	1R	2R	3R	0 / 15	29–15	66%
French Open	A	A	Q2	1R	1R	3R	SF	SF	4R	SF	4R	2R	QF	4R	1R	1R	1R	0 / 14	31–14	69%
Wimbledon	A	A	Q1	1R	3R	4R	4R	4R	3R	4R	1R	1R	2R	1R	4R	2R	1R	0 / 14	21–14	60%
US Open	A	Q1	Q3	2R	3R	SF	QF	F	2R	3R	3R	3R	4R	4R	1R	2R	1R	0 / 14	32–14	70%
Win–loss	0–0	0–0	1–1	2–4	5–4	11–4	15–4	19–4	9–4	12–4	6–4	6–4	10–4	9–4	3–4	3–4	2–4	0 / 57	113–57	66%
National representation
Summer Olympics	NH			1R	NH			QF	NH			1R	NH			A (Note: Janković withdraw from singles at the 2016 Olympics after rupturing her pectoral muscle in the first round of doubles the previous day.)	NH	0 / 3	3–3	50%
Year-end championships
WTA Finals	DNQ						RR	SF	SF	RR	DNQ		SF	DNQ				0 / 5	5–13	28%
WTA Elite Trophy	NH								A	A	DNQ		A	A (Note: Janković was awarded wildcard for the 2014 WTA Tournament of Champions, but withdrew from the tournament on 11 October.)	RR	DNQ		0 / 1	1–1	50%
WTA 1000 + former^{†} tournaments
Dubai / Qatar Open (Note: The first Premier 5 event of the year has switched back and forth between the Dubai Tennis Championships and the Qatar Total Open since 2009. Dubai was classified as a Premier 5 event from 2009 to 2011 before being succeeded by Doha for the 2012–2014 period. In 2015, Dubai regained its Premier 5 status while Doha was demoted to Premier status. The Premier 5 tournaments were reclassified as WTA 1000 tournaments in 2021.)	NMS							QF	3R	3R	SF	2R	1R	SF	2R	2R	1R	0 / 10	12–10	55%
Indian Wells Open	2R	A	1R	1R	2R	2R	4R	SF	2R	W	4R	2R	2R	QF	F	4R	2R	1 / 16	26–15	63%
Miami Open	Q1	A	1R	3R	2R	2R	3R	F	2R	4R	QF	2R	SF	2R	2R	2R	1R	0 / 15	17–15	53%
Berlin / Madrid Open (Note: In 2009, the Berlin Open was replaced by the Madrid Open. The Premier Mandatory tournaments were reclassified as WTA 1000 tournaments in 2021.)	A	A	A	A	SF	1R	QF	QF	QF	QF	2R	1R	1R	2R	A	1R	1R	0 / 12	15–12	47%
Italian Open	A	A	1R	Q1	2R	QF	W	W	QF	F	QF	1R	QF	SF	3R	1R	2R	2 / 14	30–12	71%
Canadian Open	A	A	A	2R	1R	3R	F	QF	QF	2R	1R	2R	3R	3R	2R	A	A	0 / 12	15–11	58%
Cincinnati Open	NMS/NH								W	3R	F	1R	SF	QF	SF	A	A	1 / 7	20–6	77%
Pan Pacific / Wuhan Open (Note: In 2014, the Toray Pan Pacific Open was downgraded to a Premier event and replaced by the Wuhan Open. The Premier 5 tournaments were reclassified as WTA 1000 tournaments in 2021.)	A	A	A	A	1R	1R	QF	QF	F	3R	3R	2R	3R	2R	2R	3R	A	0 / 12	14–12	54%
China Open	NMS/NH								2R	2R	1R	3R	F	1R	1R	1R	A	0 / 8	8–8	50%
Charleston Open^{†}	A	Q1	A	2R	1R	1R	W	QF	NMS									1 / 5	8–4	67%
Southern California Open^{†}	A	A	A	2R	3R	3R	3R	NMS/NH										0 / 4	6–4	60%
Zürich Open^{†}	A	A	A	A	2R	2R	2R	NMS/NH										0 / 3	2–3	40%
Kremlin Cup^{†}	A	A	A	A	1R	A	A	W	NMS									1 / 2	4–1	80%
Career statistics
	2001	2002	2003	2004	2005	2006	2007	2008	2009	2010	2011	2012	2013	2014	2015	2016	2017	SR	W–L	Win%
Tournaments	1	4	9	27	29	28	27	23	20	21	22	28	19	22	22	21	19	Career total: 343		
Titles	0	0	0	1	0	0	4	4	2	1	0	0	1	0	2	0	0	Career total: 15		
Finals	0	0	0	1	3	1	8	6	3	2	2	2	3	1	3	1	0	Career total: 36		
Hard win–loss	1–1	2–3	2–6	17–19	22–18	31–16	38–18	49–16	24–12	19–16	26–15	26–20	24–14	22–14	26–14	18–16	4–11	7 / 225	349–229	60%
Clay win–loss	0–0	0–1	1–3	6–3	7–5	8–7	23–4	13–3	17–4	16–6	12–6	3–6	21–6	16–6	5–3	0–4	2–5	6 / 78	150–72	68%
Grass win–loss	0–0	0–0	0–0	4–3	6–3	6–3	10–2	3–1	2–2	3–1	0–1	3–4	1–1	0–2	8–3	5–3	0–3	1 / 33	51–32	61%
Carpet win–loss	0–0	0–0	0–0	0–1	1–3	0–1	1–1	0–0	3–1	0–0	0–0	0–0	0–0	0–0	0–0	0–0	0–0	1 / 7	5–7	42%
Overall win–loss	1–1	2–4	3–9	27–26	36–29	45–27	72–25	65–20	46–19	38–23	38–22	32–30	46–21	38–22	39–20	23–23	6–19	15 / 343	545–340	62%
Win %	50%	33%	25%	51%	55%	63%	74%	76%	71%	62%	63%	52%	69%	63%	66%	50%	24%	Career total: 62%		
Year-end ranking	361	194	85	28	22	12	3	1	8	8	14	22	8	16	21	55	153	$19,089,259		

=== Doubles ===
Tournament	2004	2005	2006	2007	2008	2009	2010	2011	2012	2013	2014	2015	2016	2017	2018	SR	W–L	Win%
Grand Slams tournaments
Australian Open	A	2R	1R	1R	3R	A	2R	A	A	3R	2R	1R	1R	1R	A	0 / 10	6–10	38%
French Open	A	1R	1R	2R	A	A	A	2R	A	3R	3R	A	A	1R	A	0 / 7	5–7	42%
Wimbledon	A	1R	2R	A	A	A	3R	1R	1R	QF	1R	1R	3R	1R	A	0 / 10	8–9	47%
US Open	A	2R	3R	1R	A	A	1R	2R	1R	3R	3R	3R	1R	2R	A	0 / 11	11–11	50%
Win–loss	0–0	2–4	3–4	1–3	2–1	0–0	3–2	2–3	0–2	8–4	4–4	2–3	2–3	1–4	0–0	0 / 38	30–37	45%
WTA 1000 + former^{†} tournaments
Dubai / Qatar Open	not Tier I				A	A	A	A	A	1R	QF	2R	A	1R	A	0 / 4	3–4	43%
Indian Wells Open	A	2R	A	1R	A	A	2R	QF	1R	2R	1R	1R	A	A	A	0 / 8	5–8	38%
Miami Open	A	A	A	A	A	A	A	A	1R	A	1R	2R	A	1R	A	0 / 4	1–4	20%
Madrid Open	not held					A	A	A	A	2R	A	A	A	A	A	0 / 1	1–1	50%
Italian Open	A	A	1R	A	A	A	A	A	A	QF	2R	A	A	2R	A	0 / 4	4–4	50%
Canadian Open	1R	A	2R (Note: Janković, together with her doubles-partner Na Li withdraw from 2006 Rogers Cup before second-round match.)	A	A	A	A	A	A	W	2R	1R	A	A	A	1 / 5	7–3	70%
Cincinnati Open	not Tier I					A	A	A	1R	1R	1R	QF	A	A	A	0 / 4	2–4	33%
Pan Pacific / Wuhan Open	A	1R	A	QF	A	A	A	A	A	QF	A	A	A	A	A	0 / 3	2–3	40%
China Open	not Tier I					A	A	A	2R	2R	A	A	A	A	A	0 / 2	1–2	33%
Career statistics
	2004	2005	2006	2007	2008	2009	2010	2011	2012	2013	2014	2015	2016	2017	2018	SR	W–L	Win%
Tournaments	7	14	22	13	1	0	6	5	8	16	17	12	8	11	0	Career total: 150		
Year-end ranking	293	139	43	107	—	—	102	137	304	20	47	63	130	134	—	$19,089,259		

=== Mixed doubles ===
Tournament	2004	2005	2006	2007	...	2012	2013	...	2016	2017	SR	W–L	Win%
Australian Open	A	A	1R	2R		2R	A		A	A	0 / 3	2–3	40%
French Open	A	1R	A	A		A	2R		2R	A	0 / 3	2–3	40%
Wimbledon	1R	2R	A	W		A	A		A	A	1 / 3	7–1	88%
US Open	A	1R	A	A		A	A		A	A	0 / 1	0–1	0%
Win–loss	0–1	1–2	0–1	7–1		1–1	1–1		1–1	0–0	1 / 10	11–8	58%

== Significant finals ==
=== Grand Slams ===
==== Singles: 1 (runner–up) ====
Result	Year	Championship	Surface	Opponent	Score
Loss	2008	US Open	Hard	(United States) Serena Williams	4–6, 5–7

==== Mixed doubles: 1 (title) ====
Result	Year	Championship	Surface	Partner	Opponent	Score
Win	2007	Wimbledon	Grass	(United Kingdom) Jamie Murray	(Australia) Alicia Molik; (Sweden) Jonas Björkman	6–4, 3–6, 6–1

=== WTA 1000 ===
==== Singles: 13 (6 titles, 7 runner-ups) ====
Result	Year	Tournament	Surface	Opponent	Score
Win	2007	Charleston Open	Clay	(Russia) Dinara Safina	6–2, 6–2
Win	2007	Italian Open	Clay	(Russia) Svetlana Kuznetsova	7–5, 6–1
Loss	2007	Canadian Open	Hard	(Belgium) Justine Henin	6–7^{(3–7)}, 5–7
Loss	2008	Miami Open	Hard	(United States) Serena Williams	1–6, 7–5, 3–6
Win	2008	Italian Open (2)	Clay	(France) Alizé Cornet	6–2, 6–2
Win	2008	Kremlin Cup	Hard (i)	(Russia) Vera Zvonareva	6–2, 6–4
Win	2009	Cincinnati Open	Hard	(Russia) Dinara Safina	6–4, 6–2
Loss	2009	Pan Pacific Open	Hard	(Russia) Maria Sharapova	2–5 ret.
Win	2010	Indian Wells Open	Hard	(Denmark) Caroline Wozniacki	6–2, 6–4
Loss	2010	Italian Open	Clay	(Spain) María José Martínez Sánchez	6–7^{(5–7)}, 5–7
Loss	2011	Cincinnati Open	Hard	(Russia) Maria Sharapova	6–4, 6–7^{(3–7)}, 3–6
Loss	2013	China Open	Hard	(United States) Serena Williams	2–6, 2–6
Loss	2015	Indian Wells Open	Hard	(Romania) Simona Halep	6–2, 5–7, 4–6

==== Doubles: 1 (title) ====
Result	Year	Tournament	Surface	Partner	Opponents	Score
Win	2013	Canadian Open	Hard	(Slovenia) Katarina Srebotnik	(Germany) Anna-Lena Grönefeld; (Czech Republic) Květa Peschke	5–7, 6–2, [10–6]

== WTA Tour finals ==
=== Singles: 36 (15 titles, 21 runner-ups) ===
Legend Grand Slam tournaments (0–1) WTA 1000 (Tier I / Premier 5 / Premier M) (6–7) WTA 500 (Tier II / Premier) (2–5) WTA 250 (Tier III / Tier IV / International) (7–8)	Finals by surface Hard (7–15) Grass (1–3) Clay (6–3) Carpet (1–0)	Finals by setting Outdoor (13–21) Indoor (2–0)

Result	W–L	Date	Tournament	Tier	Surface	Opponent	Score
Win	1–0	May 2004	Budapest Grand Prix, Hungary	Tier IV	Clay	(Slovakia) Martina Suchá	7–6^{(7–4)}, 6–3
Loss	1–1	Mar 2005	Dubai Tennis Championships, UAE	Tier II	Hard	(United States) Lindsay Davenport	4–6, 6–3, 4–6
Loss	1–2	Jun 2005	Birmingham Classic, United Kingdom	Tier III	Grass	(Russia) Maria Sharapova	2–6, 6–4, 1–6
Loss	1–3	Oct 2005	Korea Open, South Korea	Tier IV	Hard	(Czech Republic) Nicole Vaidišová	5–7, 3–6
Loss	1–4	Aug 2006	LA Championships, United States	Tier II	Hard	(Russia) Elena Dementieva	3–6, 6–4, 4–6
Win	2–4	Jan 2007	Auckland Open, New Zealand	Tier IV	Hard	(Russia) Vera Zvonareva	7–6^{(11–9)}, 5–7, 6–3
Loss	2–5	Jan 2007	Sydney International, Australia	Tier II	Hard	(Belgium) Kim Clijsters	6–4, 6–7^{(1–7)}, 4–6
Win	3–5	Apr 2007	Charleston Open, United States	Tier I	Clay	(Russia) Dinara Safina	6–2, 6–2
Win	4–5	May 2007	Italian Open	Tier I	Clay	(Russia) Svetlana Kuznetsova	7–5, 6–1
Win	5–5	Jun 2007	Birmingham Classic, United Kingdom	Tier III	Grass	(Russia) Maria Sharapova	4–6, 6–3, 7–5
Loss	5–6	Jun 2007	Rosmalen Championships, Netherlands	Tier III	Grass	(Russia) Anna Chakvetadze	6–7^{(2–7)}, 6–3, 3–6
Loss	5–7	Aug 2007	Canadian Open	Tier I	Hard	(Belgium) Justine Henin	6–7^{(3–7)}, 5–7
Loss	5–8	Sep 2007	China Open	Tier II	Hard	(Hungary) Ágnes Szávay	7–6^{(9–7)}, 5–7, 2–6
Loss	5–9	Apr 2008	Miami Open, United States	Tier I	Hard	(United States) Serena Williams	1–6, 7–5, 3–6
Win	6–9	May 2008	Italian Open (2)	Tier I	Clay	(France) Alizé Cornet	6–2, 6–2
Loss	6–10	Sep 2008	US Open	Grand Slam	Hard	(United States) Serena Williams	4–6, 5–7
Win	7–10	Sep 2008	China Open	Tier II	Hard	(Russia) Svetlana Kuznetsova	6–3, 6–2
Win	8–10	Oct 2008	Stuttgart Open, Germany	Tier II	Hard (i)	(Russia) Nadia Petrova	6–4, 6–3
Win	9–10	Oct 2008	Kremlin Cup, Russia	Tier I	Hard (i)	(Russia) Vera Zvonareva	6–2, 6–4
Win	10–10	Apr 2009	Andalucia Tennis Experience, Spain	International	Clay	(Spain) Carla Suárez Navarro	6–3, 3–6, 6–3
Win	11–10	Aug 2009	Cincinnati Open, United States	Premier 5	Hard	(Russia) Dinara Safina	6–4, 6–2
Loss	11–11	Oct 2009	Pan Pacific Open, Japan	Premier 5	Hard	(Russia) Maria Sharapova	2–5 ret.
Win	12–11	Mar 2010	Indian Wells Open, United States	Premier M	Hard	(Denmark) Caroline Wozniacki	6–2, 6–4
Loss	12–12	May 2010	Italian Open	Premier 5	Clay	(Spain) María José Martínez Sánchez	6–7^{(5–7)}, 5–7
Loss	12–13	Mar 2011	Monterrey Open, Mexico	International	Hard	(Russia) Anastasia Pavlyuchenkova	6–2, 2–6, 3–6
Loss	12–14	Aug 2011	Cincinnati Open, United States	Premier 5	Hard	(Russia) Maria Sharapova	6–4, 6–7^{(3–7)}, 3–6
Loss	12–15	Jun 2012	Birmingham Classic, United Kingdom	International	Grass	(United States) Melanie Oudin	4–6, 2–6
Loss	12–16	Aug 2012	Texas Tennis Open, United States	International	Hard	(Italy) Roberta Vinci	5–7, 3–6
Win	13–16	Feb 2013	Copa Colsanitas, Colombia	International	Clay	(Argentina) Paula Ormaechea	6–1, 6–2
Loss	13–17	Apr 2013	Charleston Open, United States	Premier	Clay	(United States) Serena Williams	6–3, 0–6, 2–6
Loss	13–18	Oct 2013	China Open	Premier M	Hard	(United States) Serena Williams	2–6, 2–6
Loss	13–19	Apr 2014	Copa Colsanitas, Colombia	International	Clay	(France) Caroline Garcia	3–6, 4–6
Loss	13–20	Mar 2015	Indian Wells Open, United States	Premier M	Hard	(Romania) Simona Halep	6–2, 5–7, 4–6
Win	14–20	Sep 2015	Guangzhou Open, China	International	Hard	(Czech Republic) Denisa Allertová	6–2, 6–0
Win	15–20	Oct 2015	Hong Kong Open	International	Hard	(Germany) Angelique Kerber	3–6, 7–6^{(7–4)}, 6–1
Loss	15–21	Sep 2016	Guangzhou Open, China	International	Hard	(Ukraine) Lesia Tsurenko	4–6, 6–3, 4–6

=== Doubles: 5 (2 titles, 3 runner-ups) ===
Legend WTA 1000 (Premier 5) (1–0) WTA 250 (Tier III / International) (1–3)	Finals by surface Hard (1–1) Grass (1–2)	Finals by setting Outdoor (3–3) Indoor (0–0)

Result	W–L	Date	Tournament	Tier	Surface	Partner	Opponents	Score
Win	1–0	Jun 2006	Birmingham Classic, United Kingdom	Tier III	Grass	(China) Li Na	(United States) Jill Craybas; (South Africa) Liezel Huber	6–2, 6–4
Win	2–0	Aug 2013	Canadian Open	Premier 5	Hard	(Slovenia) Katarina Srebotnik	(Germany) Anna-Lena Grönefeld; (Czech Republic) Květa Peschke	5–7, 6–2, [10–6]
Loss	2–1	Jun 2015	Rosmalen Championships, Netherlands	International	Grass	(Russia) Anastasia Pavlyuchenkova	(United States) Asia Muhammad; (Germany) Laura Siegemund	3–6, 5–7
Loss	2–2	Jul 2015	İstanbul Cup, Turkey	International	Hard	(Turkey) Çağla Büyükakçay	(Russia) Daria Gavrilova; (Ukraine) Elina Svitolina	7–5, 1–6, [4–10]
Loss	2–3	Jun 2017	Mallorca Open, Spain	International	Grass	(Latvia) Anastasija Sevastova	(Chinese Taipei) Chan Yung-jan; (Switzerland) Martina Hingis	walkover

== WTA 125 tournaments ==
=== Singles: 1 (title) ===
Result	W–L	Date	Tournament	Surface	Opponent	Score
Win	1–0	Aug 2015	Jiangxi International, China	Hard	(Chinese Taipei) Chang Kai-chen	6–3, 7–6^{(8–6)}

== ITF Circuit finals ==
=== Singles: 2 (1 title, 1 runner-up) ===
Legend
$75,000 tournaments
$25,000 tournaments

Result	W–L	Year	Tournament	Tier	Surface	Opponent	Score
Loss	0–1	May 2002	ITF Charlottesville, United States	25,000	Hard	(United States) Erika deLone	2–6, 4–6
Win	1–1	Oct 2003	Al Habtoor Challenge, United Arab Emirates	75,000	Hard	(Slovakia) Henrieta Nagyová	6–2, 7–5

== Junior Grand Slam finals ==
=== Girls' singles: 1 title ===
Result	Year	Tournament	Surface	Opponent	Score
Win	2001	Australian Open	Hard	(Sweden) Sofia Arvidsson	6–2, 6–1

=== Girls' doubles: 1 runner-up ===
Result	Year	Tournament	Surface	Partner	Opponents	Score
Loss	2001	US Open	Hard	(Croatia) Matea Mezak	(Russia) Galina Fokina (Russia) Svetlana Kuznetsova	5–7, 3–6

== Billie Jean King Cup ==
=== Finals ===
Result	W–L	Date	Team competition	Surface	Partner/team	Opponents	Score
Loss	0–1	4 Jan 2008	Hopman Cup, Perth, Australia	Hard	(Serbia) Novak Djokovic	(United States) Serena Williams; (United States) Mardy Fish	1–2
Loss	0–2	3–4 Nov 2012	Fed Cup, Prague, Czech Republic	Hard (i)	(Serbia) Ana Ivanovic; (Serbia) Bojana Jovanovski; (Serbia) Aleksandra Krunić	(Czech Republic) Petra Kvitová; (Czech Republic) Lucie Šafářová; (Czech Republic) Lucie Hradecká; (Czech Republic) Andrea Hlaváčková	1–3

== WTA Tour career earnings ==
Year	Grand Slam titles (Note: Includes singles, doubles and mixed doubles titles.)	WTA titles	Total titles	Earnings ($)	Money list rank
2000–02	0	0	0	37,918	n/a
2003	0	0	0	76,459	132
2004	0	1	1	234,496	51
2005	0	0	0	450,441	30
2006	0	0	0	746,144	14
2007	0	4	4	1,831,012	6
2008	0	4	4	3,564,465	3
2009	0	2	2	2,491,514	5
2010	0	1	1	2,136,991	7
2011	0	0	0	1,078,418	15
2012	0	0	0	649,868	25
2013	0	1	1	2,030,349	10
2014	0	0	0	1,509,514	19
2015	0	2	2	1,314,749	26
2016	0	0	0	548,797	61
2017*	0	0	0	388,124	95
Career*	0	15	15	19,089,259	23

*As of 6 November 2017

== Career Grand Slam statistics ==
=== Grand Slam tournament seedings ===
Year	Australian Open	French Open	Wimbledon	US Open
2004	not seeded	not seeded	not seeded	not seeded
2005	23rd	15th	17th	17th
2006	23rd	not seeded	26th	19th
2007	11th	4th	3rd	3rd
2008	3rd	3rd	2nd	2nd
2009	1st	5th	6th	5th
2010	8th	4th	4th	4th
2011	7th	10th	15th	11th
2012	13th	19th	15th	30th
2013	22nd	16th	16th	9th
2014	8th	6th	7th	9th
2015	15th	25th	28th	21st
2016	19th	23rd	22nd	not seeded
2017	not seeded	not seeded	not seeded	not seeded
2018	did not play	did not play	did not play	did not play

=== Best Grand Slam results details ===
Australian Open
2008 Australian Open (3rd seed)
Round	Opponent	Rank	Score
1R	(Austria) Tamira Paszek	39	2–6, 6–2, 10–8
2R	(Romania) Edina Gallovits	76	6–2, 7–5
3R	(France) Virginie Razzano [30]	29	6–2, 4–6, 6–1
4R	(Australia) Casey Dellacqua	78	7–6^{(7–3)}, 6–1
QF	(United States) Serena Williams [7]	7	6–3, 6–4
SF	(Russia) Maria Sharapova [5]	5	3–6, 1–6

Wimbledon Championships
2006 Wimbledon (26th seed)
Round	Opponent	Rank	Score
1R	(Spain) Lourdes Domínguez Lino	48	6–3, 6–4
2R	(United States) Vania King	88	6–2, 4–6, 6–4
3R	(United States) Venus Williams [6]	12	7–6^{(10–8)}, 4–6, 6–4
4R	(Russia) Anastasia Myskina [9]	11	4–6, 6–7^{(5–7)}
2007 Wimbledon (3rd seed)
1R	(United Kingdom) Anne Keothavong [WC]	178	6–2, 6–0
2R	(Slovakia) Jarmila Gajdošová	105	6–1, 6–1
3R	(Czech Republic) Lucie Šafářová [25]	26	5–7, 7–6^{(7–4)}, 6–2
4R	(France) Marion Bartoli [18]	19	6–3, 5–7, 3–6
2008 Wimbledon (2nd seed)
1R	(Ukraine) Olga Savchuk	113	6–3, 6–2
2R	(Spain) Carla Suárez Navarro [WC]	56	6–1, 6–3
3R	(Denmark) Caroline Wozniacki [31]	30	2–6, 6–4, 6–2
4R	(Thailand) Tamarine Tanasugarn	60	3–6, 2–6
2010 Wimbledon (4th seed)
1R	(United Kingdom) Laura Robson [WC]	234	6–3, 7–6^{(7–5)}
2R	(Canada) Aleksandra Wozniak	60	4–6, 6–2, 6–4
3R	(Ukraine) Alona Bondarenko [28]	30	6–0, 6–3
4R	(Russia) Vera Zvonareva [21]	21	1–6, 0–3, ret.
2015 Wimbledon (28th seed)
1R	(Russia) Elena Vesnina	89	6–4, 3–6, 10–8
2R	(Russia) Evgeniya Rodina	101	6–7^{(4–7)}, 6–1, 6–3
3R	(Czech Republic) Petra Kvitová [2]	2	3–6, 7–5, 6–4
4R	(Poland) Agnieszka Radwańska [13]	13	5–7, 4–6

French Open
2007 French Open (4th seed)
Round	Opponent	Rank	Score
1R	(France) Stéphanie Foretz (WC)	143	6–2, 6–2
2R	(Colombia) Catalina Castaño	99	6–3, 6–3
3R	(United States) Venus Williams [26]	27	6–4, 4–6, 6–1
4R	(France) Marion Bartoli [18]	21	6–1, 6–1
QF	(Czech Republic) Nicole Vaidišová [6]	10	6–3, 7–5
SF	(Belgium) Justine Henin [1]	1	2–6, 2–6
2008 French Open (3rd seed)
1R	(Romania) Monica Niculescu [LL]	86	7–6^{(7–3)}, 6–2
2R	(New Zealand) Marina Erakovic	80	6–2, 7–6^{(7–5)}
3R	(Slovakia) Dominika Cibulková [28]	31	7–5, 6–3
4R	(Poland) Agnieszka Radwańska [14]	15	6–3, 7–6^{(7–3)}
QF	(Spain) Carla Suárez Navarro [Q]	132	6–3, 6–2
SF	(Serbia) Ana Ivanovic [2]	3	4–6, 6–3, 4–6
2010 French Open (4th seed)
1R	(Australia) Alicia Molik	94	6–0, 6–4
2R	(Estonia) Kaia Kanepi	118	6–2, 3–6, 6–4
3R	(Ukraine) Alona Bondarenko [27]	31	6–4, 7–6^{(7–3)}
4R	(Slovakia) Daniela Hantuchová [23]	26	6–4, 6–2
QF	(Kazakhstan) Yaroslava Shvedova	36	7–5, 6–4
SF	(Australia) Samantha Stosur [7]	7	1–6, 2–6

US Open
2008 US Open (2nd seed)
Round	Opponent	Rank	Score
1R	(United States) CoCo Vandeweghe [WC]	512	6–3, 6–1
2R	(Sweden) Sofia Arvidsson	63	6–3, 6–7^{(5–7)}, 7–5
3R	(China) Jie Zheng	37	7–5, 7–5
4R	(Denmark) Caroline Wozniacki [21]	18	3–6, 6–2, 6–1
QF	(Austria) Sybille Bammer [29]	30	6–1, 6–4
SF	(Russia) Elena Dementieva [5]	6	6–4, 6–4
F	(United States) Serena Williams [4]	3	4–6, 5–7

== Record against other players ==
=== No. 1 wins ===
#	Player	Event	Surface	Round	Score	Result
1	(Russia) Dinara Safina	2009 Cincinnati Open	Hard	F	6–4, 6–2	W
2	(Russia) Dinara Safina	2009 WTA Tour Championships	Hard	RR	1–1 ret.	SF
3	(United States) Serena Williams	2010 Italian Open	Clay	SF	4–6, 6–3, 7–6^{(7–5)}	F

=== Top 10 wins ===
Season	2004	2005	2006	2007	2008	2009	2010	2011	2012	2013	2014	2015	2016	Total
Wins	1	1	4	7	12	5	4	2	1	5	3	3	2	50

#	Player	vsRank	Event	Surface	Round	Score
2004
1.	(Russia) Elena Dementieva	8	Australian Open	Hard	1R	6–1, 6–4
2005
2.	(United States) Serena Williams	4	Dubai Championships, UAE	Hard	SF	6–0, 4–3, retired
2006
3.	(Czech Republic) Nicole Vaidišová	10	US Open	Hard	3R	5–7, 6–3, 6–2
4.	(Russia) Svetlana Kuznetsova	7	US Open	Hard	4R	6–7^{(5–7)}, 6–3, 6–2
5.	(Russia) Elena Dementieva	5	US Open	Hard	QF	6–2, 6–1
6.	(Russia) Nadia Petrova	7	China Open	Hard	QF	6–4, 4–6, 6–2
2007
7.	(Switzerland) Martina Hingis	7	Sydney International, Australia	Hard	1R	6–4, 4–6, 6–3
8.	(France) Amélie Mauresmo	3	Sydney International, Australia	Hard	QF	7–5, 6–0
9.	(Switzerland) Martina Hingis	6	Dubai Championships, UAE	Hard	QF	7–6^{(7–3)}, 6–2
10.	(Russia) Svetlana Kuznetsova	3	Italian Open	Clay	F	7–5, 6–1
11.	(Czech Republic) Nicole Vaidišová	10	French Open	Clay	QF	6–3, 7–5
12.	(Russia) Maria Sharapova	2	Birmingham Classic, UK	Grass	F	4–6, 6–3, 7–5
13.	(Russia) Nadia Petrova	9	Stuttgart Open, Germany	Hard (i)	QF	6–7^{(5–7)}, 5–1 RET
2008
14.	(United States) Serena Williams	7	Australian Open	Hard	QF	6–3, 6–4
15.	(Russia) Anna Chakvetadze	6	Dubai Championships, UAE	Hard	QF	6–1, retired
16.	(United States) Venus Williams	6	Italian Open	Clay	QF	5–7, 6–2, 6–3
17.	(Russia) Elena Dementieva	6	US Open	Hard	SF	6–4, 6–4
18.	(Russia) Vera Zvonareva	9	China Open	Hard	SF	6–4, 2–6, 6–4
19.	(Russia) Svetlana Kuznetsova	7	China Open	Hard	F	6–3, 6–2
20.	(Russia) Vera Zvonareva	9	Stuttgart Open, Germany	Hard (i)	QF	7–6^{(10–8)}, 7–6^{(7–5)}
21.	(United States) Venus Williams	8	Stuttgart Open, Germany	Hard (i)	SF	6–7^{(8–10)}, 7–5, 6–2
22.	(Russia) Elena Dementieva	4	Kremlin Cup, Russia	Hard (i)	SF	0–6, 6–1, 6–0
23.	(Russia) Vera Zvonareva	9	Kremlin Cup, Russia	Hard (i)	F	6–2, 6–4
24.	(Serbia) Ana Ivanovic	4	WTA Championships, Doha	Hard	RR	6–3, 6–4
25.	(Russia) Svetlana Kuznetsova	7	WTA Championships, Doha	Hard	RR	7–6^{(8–6)}, 6–4
2009
26.	(Belarus) Victoria Azarenka	9	Cincinnati Open, U.S.	Hard	3R	7–5, 7–6^{(7–4)}
27.	(Russia) Elena Dementieva	4	Cincinnati Open, U.S.	Hard	SF	7–6^{(7–2)}, 0–6, 7–6^{(8–6)}
28.	(Russia) Dinara Safina	1	Cincinnati Open, U.S.	Hard	F	6–4, 6–2
29.	(Denmark) Caroline Wozniacki	4	WTA Championships, Doha	Hard	RR	6–2, 6–2
30.	(Russia) Dinara Safina	1	WTA Championships, Doha	Hard (i)	RR	1–1, retired
2010
31.	(Russia) Svetlana Kuznetsova	4	Fed Cup, Belgrade, Serbia	Hard (i)	RR	6–3, 2–6, 6–3
32.	(Denmark) Caroline Wozniacki	4	Indian Wells Open, U.S.	Hard	F	6–2, 6–4
33.	(United States) Venus Williams	4	Italian Open	Clay	QF	6–0, 6–1
34.	(United States) Serena Williams	1	Italian Open	Clay	SF	4–6, 6–3, 7–6^{(7–5)}
2011
35.	(Australia) Samantha Stosur	4	Dubai Championships, UAE	Hard	QF	6–3, 5–7, 7–6^{(7–4)}
36.	(Italy) Francesca Schiavone	8	Cincinnati Open, U.S.	Hard	3R	6–3, 5–7, 6–4
2012
37.	(Australia) Samantha Stosur	5	Dubai Championships, UAE	Hard	QF	6–4, 6–2
2013
38.	(Australia) Samantha Stosur	9	Stuttgart Open, Germany	Clay (i)	1R	6–4, 6–4
39.	(China) Li Na	5	Italian Open	Clay	3R	7–6^{(7–2)}, 7–5
40.	(Australia) Samantha Stosur	9	French Open	Clay	3R	3–6, 6–3, 6–4
41.	(Czech Republic) Petra Kvitová	7	China Open	Hard	SF	6–7^{(7–9)}, 6–1, 6–1
42.	(Belarus) Victoria Azarenka	2	WTA Championships, Istanbul	Hard	RR	6–4, 6–3
2014
43.	(Germany) Angelique Kerber	9	Brisbane International, Australia	Hard	QF	6–7^{(8–10)}, 6–3, 6–1
44.	(Czech Republic) Petra Kvitová	6	Qatar Open	Hard	QF	6–1, 6–3
45.	(Poland) Agnieszka Radwańska	3	Italian Open	Clay	QF	6–4, 6–4
2015
46.	(Czech Republic) Petra Kvitová	2	Wimbledon, United Kingdom	Grass	3R	3–6, 7–5, 6–4
47.	(Czech Republic) Karolína Plíšková	7	Cincinnati Open, U.S.	Hard	3R	6–2, 3–6, 7–5
48.	(Germany) Angelique Kerber	9	Hong Kong Open	Hard	F	3–6, 7–6^{(7–4)}, 6–1
2016
49.	(Switzerland) Belinda Bencic	9	Dubai Championships, UAE	Hard	1R	4–6, 7–5, 6–4
50.	(Spain) Garbiñe Muguruza	3	Wuhan Open, China	Hard	2R	6–4, 7–6^{(7–2)}

=== Double bagel matches ===
Result	Year	No.	Tournament	Surface	Opponent	vsRank	Round
Win	2003	1.	J&S Cup Warsaw, Poland	Clay	(Poland) Aleksandra Rosolska	n/a	Q-R32
Loss	2004	1.	Amelia Island Championships, United States	Clay	(Australia) Alicia Molik	39	R64
Win	2004	2.	Budapest Grand Prix, Hungary	Clay	(Slovakia) Ľudmila Cervanová	72	QF
Win	2007	3.	China Open, China	Hard	(Spain) Virginia Ruano Pascual	96	R16
Win	2013	4.	China Open, China	Hard	(Spain) Carla Suárez Navarro	15	R16
