= 2013 Copa Colsanitas =

- Date: 18– 24 February
- Edition: 16th
- Category: WTA International
- Draw: 32S / 16D
- Prize money: $235,000
- Surface: Clay
- Location: Bogotá, Colombia

Champions

Singles
- (Serbia) Jelena Janković

Doubles
- (Hungary) Tímea Babos / (Luxembourg) Mandy Minella
| ← 2012 · | Copa Colsanitas | · 2014 → |

The 2013 Copa Colsanitas was a women's tennis tournament played on outdoor clay courts. It was the 16th edition of the Copa Colsanitas, and part of the International category of the 2013 WTA Tour. It took place at the Centro de Alto Rendimiento in Bogotá, Colombia, from 18 to 24 February.

== Finals ==
=== Singles ===
(Serbia) Jelena Janković defeated (Argentina) Paula Ormaechea, 6–1, 6–2

- It was Janković's only singles title of the year and the 13th of her career.

=== Doubles ===
(Hungary) Tímea Babos / (Luxembourg) Mandy Minella defeated (Czech Republic) Eva Birnerová / (Russia) Alexandra Panova, 6–4, 6–3

== Singles main draw entrants ==
=== Seeds ===
| Country | Player | Rank^{1} | Seed |
|---|---|---|---|
| SRB | Jelena Janković | 25 | 1 |
| FRA | Alizé Cornet | 36 | 2 |
| ESP | Lourdes Domínguez Lino | 53 | 3 |
| ITA | Francesca Schiavone | 54 | 4 |
| ITA | Flavia Pennetta | 56 | 5 |
| NED | Arantxa Rus | 74 | 6 |
| FRA | Pauline Parmentier | 79 | 7 |
| HUN | Tímea Babos | 80 | 8 |

- Rankings are as of February 11, 2013.

=== Other entrants ===
The following players received wildcards into the singles main draw:

- (Colombia) Catalina Castaño
- (Colombia) Mariana Duque Mariño
- (Colombia) Yuliana Lizarazo

The following players received entry from the qualifying draw:

- (Canada) Sharon Fichman
- (Spain) Beatriz García Vidagany
- (Croatia) Tereza Mrdeža
- (Brazil) Teliana Pereira

=== Withdrawals ===
Before the tournament

- (Romania) Irina-Camelia Begu
- (Czech Republic) Petra Cetkovská
- (Romania) Alexandra Dulgheru
- (Romania) Edina Gallovits-Hall
- (Slovenia) Polona Hercog
- (Switzerland) Romina Oprandi
- (Russia) Vera Zvonareva (shoulder injury)

== Doubles main draw entrants ==
=== Seeds ===
| Country | Player | Country | Player | Rank^{1} | Seed |
|---|---|---|---|---|---|
| CZE | Eva Birnerová | RUS | Alexandra Panova | 117 | 1 |
| HUN | Tímea Babos | LUX | Mandy Minella | 139 | 2 |
| RUS | Nina Bratchikova | GEO | Oksana Kalashnikova | 164 | 3 |
| USA | Julia Cohen | GER | Tatjana Malek | 218 | 4 |

- Rankings are as of February 11, 2013.

=== Other entrants ===
The following pairs received wildcards into the doubles main draw:

- (Serbia) Jelena Janković / (Serbia) Aleksandra Krunić
- (Colombia) María Paulina Pérez / (Colombia) Paula Andrea Pérez
