= 2014 Copa Colsanitas – Singles =

Singles
- 2014 Copa Colsanitas

Final
- Champion: (France) Caroline Garcia
- Runner-up: (Serbia) Jelena Janković
- Score: 6–3, 6–4

Details
- Draw: 32
- Seeds: 8

Events
Singles	Doubles
← 2013 ·	Copa Colsanitas	· 2015 →

Jelena Janković was the defending champion, but lost to Caroline Garcia in the final, 3–6, 4–6.

== Seeds ==
1. (Serbia) Jelena Janković (final)
2. (United States) Sloane Stephens (first round)
3. (Italy) Karin Knapp (first round)
4. (Slovakia) Anna Karolína Schmiedlová (first round)

5. (France) Caroline Garcia (champion)
6. (United States) Vania King (semifinals)
7. (Argentina) Paula Ormaechea (second round)
8. (Spain) Lourdes Domínguez Lino (quarterfinals)

== Draw ==
=== Key ===
- Q = Qualifier
- WC = Wild card
- LL = Lucky loser
- Alt = Alternate
- SE = Special exempt
- PR = Protected ranking
- ITF = ITF entry
- JE = Junior exempt
- w/o = Walkover
- r = Retired
- d = Defaulted
- SR = Special ranking

=== Finals ===
Semifinals
1	(Serbia) Jelena Janković	6	7
(South Africa) Chanelle Scheepers	1	5
5	(France) Caroline Garcia	6	6
6	(United States) Vania King	2	4

Final
1	(Serbia) Jelena Janković	3	4
5	(France) Caroline Garcia	6	6

=== Top half ===
First round
1	(Serbia) J Janković	7	7
(France) M Johansson	5	5
(Germany) D Pfizenmaier	4	6	2
LL	(Georgia (country)) S Shapatava	6	2	6
WC	(Colombia) M Herazo González	1	0
Q	(Spain) L Arruabarrena	6	6
(Austria) P Mayr-Achleitner	5	1
7	(Argentina) P Ormaechea	7	6
3	(Italy) K Knapp	3	6^{4}
(South Africa) C Scheepers	6	7^{7}
(Russia) A Panova	6	4	6
(France) K Mladenovic	1	6	2
WC	(Colombia) Y Lizarazo	7	6
Q	(United States) S Vickery	5	4
(Brazil) T Pereira	2	4
8	(Spain) L Domínguez Lino	6	6

Second round
1	(Serbia) J Janković	6	6
LL	(Georgia (country)) S Shapatava	4	3
Q	(Spain) L Arruabarrena	6	7^{7}
7	(Argentina) P Ormaechea	4	6^{3}
(South Africa) C Scheepers	6	6
(Russia) A Panova	3	2
WC	(Colombia) Y Lizarazo	2	3
8	(Spain) L Domínguez Lino	6	6

Quarterfinals
1	(Serbia) J Janković	6	6
Q	(Spain) L Arruabarrena	4	4
(South Africa) C Scheepers	6	6
8	(Spain) L Domínguez Lino	2	1

Semifinals
1	(Serbia) J Janković	6	7
(South Africa) C Scheepers	1	5

=== Bottom half ===
First round
5	(France) C Garcia	6	6
Q	(Argentina) F Molinero	3	4
Q	(United States) N Gibbs	6	3	0
(Montenegro) D Kovinić	4	6	6
(Switzerland) R Oprandi	7^{9}	6
PR	(Germany) T Maria	6^{7}	1
(Romania) I-C Begu	6	6
4	(Slovakia) AK Schmiedlová	3	1
6	(United States) V King	6	7
(Slovenia) T Majerič	1	5
(Russia) A Kudryavtseva	2	6	3
WC	(Argentina) M Irigoyen	6	4	6
(Australia) O Rogowska	2	2
LL	(Russia) I Khromacheva	6	6
(Colombia) M Duque Mariño	6	6
2	(United States) S Stephens	3	3

Second round
5	(France) C Garcia	2	6	6
(Montenegro) D Kovinić	6	3	4
(Switzerland) R Oprandi	6	6
(Romania) I-C Begu	4	1
6	(United States) V King	6	3	6
WC	(Argentina) M Irigoyen	4	6	0
LL	(Russia) I Khromacheva	2	4
(Colombia) M Duque Mariño	6	6

Quarterfinals
5	(France) C Garcia	6	7
(Switzerland) R Oprandi	1	5
6	(United States) V King	7^{7}	7
(Colombia) M Duque Mariño	6^{4}	5

Semifinals
5	(France) C Garcia	6	6
6	(United States) V King	2	4

== Qualifying ==
=== Seeds ===
1. (United States) Nicole Gibbs (qualified)
2. (Spain) Lara Arruabarrena (qualified)
3. (Venezuela) Adriana Pérez (first round)
4. (Argentina) Florencia Molinero (qualified)
5. (United States) Sachia Vickery (qualified)
6. (United States) Julia Cohen (second round)
7. (Georgia (country)) Sofia Shapatava (qualifying competition, lucky loser)
8. (Italy) Anastasia Grymalska (first round)

=== Qualifiers ===
1. (United States) Nicole Gibbs
2. (Spain) Lara Arruabarrena
3. (United States) Sachia Vickery
4. (Argentina) Florencia Molinero

=== Lucky losers ===
1. (Georgia (country)) Sofia Shapatava
2. (Russia) Irina Khromacheva

=== Qualifying draw ===
==== First qualifier ====
First round
1	(United States) Nicole Gibbs	6	6
(Bosnia and Herzegovina) Jasmina Tinjić	0	2
(United States) Chieh-Yu Hsu	5	6	7
(Bosnia and Herzegovina) Dea Herdželaš	7	4	5
(Spain) Arantxa Parra Santonja	6	7^{7}
(Brazil) Laura Pigossi	3	6^{4}
(Argentina) Catalina Pella	6	6
8	(Italy) Anastasia Grymalska	3	3

Second round
1	(United States) Nicole Gibbs	2	7^{7}	6
(United States) Chieh-Yu Hsu	6	6^{3}	0
(Spain) Arantxa Parra Santonja	3	6^{1}
(Argentina) Catalina Pella	6	7^{7}

Qualifying competition
1	(United States) Nicole Gibbs	3	6	6
(Argentina) Catalina Pella	6	3	1

==== Second qualifier ====
First round
2	(Spain) Lara Arruabarrena	6	6
WC	(Colombia) Laura Arciniegas	0	0
(Paraguay) Montserrat González	2	6	6
(Italy) Gioia Barbieri	6	1	3
(Belgium) Ysaline Bonaventure	6	6
WC	(United States) Daniella Moreno-Kaste	0	0
(Spain) Laura Pous Tió	3	3
7	(Georgia (country)) Sofia Shapatava	6	6

Second round
2	(Spain) Lara Arruabarrena	6	5	6
(Paraguay) Montserrat González	3	7	3
(Belgium) Ysaline Bonaventure	6	3	1
7	(Georgia (country)) Sofia Shapatava	3	6	6

Qualifying competition
2	(Spain) Lara Arruabarrena	4	6	6
7	(Georgia (country)) Sofia Shapatava	6	3	2

==== Third qualifier ====
First round
3	(Venezuela) Adriana Pérez	3	3
(Russia) Irina Khromacheva	6	6
(France) Irina Ramialison	5	4
(France) Amandine Hesse	7	6
WC	(Colombia) Diana Monsalve	1	2
(Spain) Beatriz García Vidagany	6	6
(United States) Nicole Melichar	6^{3}	0
5	(United States) Sachia Vickery	7^{7}	6

Second round
(Russia) Irina Khromacheva	7	6
(France) Amandine Hesse	5	4
(Spain) Beatriz García Vidagany	6	5	6^{3}
5	(United States) Sachia Vickery	3	7	7

Qualifying competition
(Russia) Irina Khromacheva	6^{5}	1
5	(United States) Sachia Vickery	7^{7}	6

==== Fourth qualifier ====
First round
4	(Argentina) Florencia Molinero	6	6
(Russia) Marina Melnikova	1	2
(Bulgaria) Elitsa Kostova	7^{8}	6
(Germany) Christina Shakovets	6^{6}	1
WC	(United States) Daniella Roldan	1	1
(Canada) Françoise Abanda	6	6
(Netherlands) Anna Katalina Alzate Esmurzaeva	2	0
6	(United States) Julia Cohen	6	6

Second round
4	(Argentina) Florencia Molinero	7^{7}	6
(Bulgaria) Elitsa Kostova	6^{1}	4
(Canada) Françoise Abanda	7	6
6	(United States) Julia Cohen	5	1

Qualifying competition
4	(Argentina) Florencia Molinero	7^{8}	6
(Canada) Françoise Abanda	6^{6}	3
