= 2014 Copa Colsanitas =

- Date: 7–13 April
- Edition: 17th
- Category: WTA International
- Draw: 32S / 16D
- Prize money: $250,000
- Surface: Clay
- Location: Bogotá, Colombia

Champions

Singles
- (France) Caroline Garcia

Doubles
- (Spain) Lara Arruabarrena / (France) Caroline Garcia
← 2013 ·	Copa Colsanitas	· 2015 →

The 2014 Copa Colsanitas was a women's tennis tournament played on outdoor clay courts. It was the 17th edition of the Copa Colsanitas, and part of the International category of the 2014 WTA Tour. It took place at the Centro de Alto Rendimiento in Bogotá, Colombia, from 7 April until 13 April. Fifth-seeded Caroline Garcia won the singles title.

== Finals ==
=== Singles ===
- (France) Caroline Garcia defeated (Serbia) Jelena Janković, 6–3, 6–4

=== Doubles ===
- (Spain) Lara Arruabarrena / (France) Caroline Garcia defeated (United States) Vania King / (South Africa) Chanelle Scheepers, 7–6^{(7–5)}, 6–4

== Points and prize money ==
=== Point distribution ===
Event	W	F	SF	QF	Round of 16	Round of 32	Q	Q3	Q2	Q1
Singles	280	180	110	60	30	1	18	14	10	1
Doubles	280	180	110	60	1	—	—	—	—	—

=== Prize money ===
Event	W	F	SF	QF	Round of 16	Round of 32	Q3	Q2	Q1
Singles	$43,000	$21,400	$11,300	$5,900	$3,310	$1,925	$1,005	$730	$530
Doubles	$12,300	$6,400	$3,435	$1,820	$960	—	—	—	—

== Singles main-draw entrants ==
=== Seeds ===
Country	Player	Rank^{1}	Seed
SRB	Jelena Janković	8	1
USA	Sloane Stephens	18	2
ITA	Karin Knapp	50	3
SVK	Anna Karolína Schmiedlová	66	4
FRA	Caroline Garcia	71	5
USA	Vania King	72	6
ARG	Paula Ormaechea	74	7
ESP	Lourdes Domínguez Lino	76	8

- Rankings are as of March 31, 2014.

=== Other entrants ===
The following players received wildcards into the singles main draw:

- (Colombia) María Herazo González
- (Argentina) María Irigoyen
- (Colombia) Yuliana Lizarazo

The following player received entry using a protected ranking into the singles main draw:

- (Germany) Tatjana Maria

The following players received entry from the qualifying draw:

- (Spain) Lara Arruabarrena
- (United States) Nicole Gibbs
- (Argentina) Florencia Molinero
- (United States) Sachia Vickery

The following players received entry as lucky losers:

- (Russia) Irina Khromacheva
- (Georgia (country)) Sofia Shapatava

=== Withdrawals ===
Before the tournament

- (Spain) Estrella Cabeza Candela → replaced by (Slovenia) Tadeja Majerič
- (Canada) Sharon Fichman (gastrointestinal illness) → replaced by (Russia) Irina Khromacheva
- (Germany) Anna-Lena Friedsam → replaced by (Romania) Irina-Camelia Begu
- (Belarus) Olga Govortsova (left knee injury) → replaced by (Georgia (country)) Sofia Shapatava
- (Spain) Anabel Medina Garrigues → replaced by (France) Mathilde Johansson
- (Luxembourg) Mandy Minella → replaced by (Russia) Alla Kudryavtseva
- (United Kingdom) Laura Robson → replaced by (Colombia) Mariana Duque
- (Kazakhstan) Yaroslava Shvedova → replaced by (Germany) Tatjana Maria
- (Croatia) Ajla Tomljanović → replaced by (Australia) Olivia Rogowska

== Doubles main-draw entrants ==
=== Seeds ===
Country	Player	Country	Player	Rank^{1}	Seed
USA	Vania King	RSA	Chanelle Scheepers	96	1
ESP	Lourdes Domínguez Lino	ESP	Arantxa Parra Santonja	122	2
ROU	Irina-Camelia Begu	ARG	María Irigoyen	164	3
CAN	Sharon Fichman	RUS	Alexandra Panova	184	4

- Rankings are as of March 31, 2014.

=== Other entrants ===
The following pairs received wildcards into the doubles main draw:

- (Colombia) María Herazo González / (Colombia) María Paulina Pérez
- (Argentina) Paula Ormaechea / (United States) Sloane Stephens

The following pairs received entry as alternates:

- (Italy) Anastasia Grymalska / (Germany) Christina Shakovets
- (United States) Chieh-Yu Hsu / (Bulgaria) Elitsa Kostova

=== Withdrawals ===
Before the tournament

- (Brazil) Teliana Pereira (thigh injury)
- (Australia) Olivia Rogowska (right thigh injury)

During the tournament

- (Bulgaria) Elitsa Kostova (right wrist injury)
