= 2013 Copa Colsanitas – Doubles =

Tennis tournament

Doubles
- 2013 Copa Colsanitas

Final
- Champions: (Hungary) Tímea Babos (Luxembourg) Mandy Minella
- Runners-up: (Czech Republic) Eva Birnerová (Russia) Alexandra Panova
- Score: 6–4, 6–3

Details
- Draw: 16
- Seeds: 4

Events
Singles	Doubles
- Copa Colsanitas

Eva Birnerová and Alexandra Panova were the defending champions, but they lost in the final to Tímea Babos and Mandy Minella, 4–6, 3–6.

== Seeds ==
1. (Czech Republic) Eva Birnerová / (Russia) Alexandra Panova (final)
2. (Hungary) Tímea Babos / (Luxembourg) Mandy Minella (champions)
3. (Russia) Nina Bratchikova / (Georgia (country)) Oksana Kalashnikova (first round)
4. (United States) Julia Cohen / (Germany) Tatjana Malek (first round)

== Draw ==
Key

- Q = Qualifier
- WC = Wild card
- LL = Lucky loser
- Alt = Alternate
- ITF = ITF entry
- PR = Protected ranking
- SR = Special ranking
- SE = Special exempt
- JE = Junior exempt
- JR = Junior Accelerator Programme entrant
- CO = College Accelerator Programme entrant
- NG = Next Gen Accelerator Program entrant
- w/o = Walkover
- r = Retired
- d = Defaulted

First round
1	(Czech Republic) E Birnerová (Russia) A Panova	6	6
(Netherlands) R Hogenkamp (Poland) K Piter	2	4
(France) S Beltrame (France) L Thorpe	7^{7}	4	[11]
(Ukraine) K Kozlova (Switzerland) A Sadiković	6^{5}	6	[9]
3	(Russia) N Bratchikova (Georgia (country)) O Kalashnikova	0	3
(Romania) E Bogdan (Romania) A Cadanțu	6	6
WC	(Colombia) MP Pérez (Colombia) PA Pérez	1	5
(France) A Cornet (France) P Parmentier	6	7
(Spain) L Arruabarrena (Spain) L Domínguez Lino	3	6	[5]
(Argentina) M Auroux (Argentina) M Irigoyen	6	2	[10]
WC	(Serbia) J Janković (Serbia) A Krunić	7	6^{3}	[10]
4	(United States) J Cohen (Germany) T Malek	5	7^{7}	[8]
(Spain) I Ferrer Suárez (Spain) A Parra Santonja	6	0	[10]
(Colombia) C Castaño (Colombia) M Duque	4	6	[6]
(Poland) P Kania (Belarus) P Pekhova	1	3
2	(Hungary) T Babos (Luxembourg) M Minella	6	6

Quarterfinals
1	(Czech Republic) E Birnerová (Russia) A Panova	1	7^{7}	[10]
(France) S Beltrame (France) L Thorpe	6	6^{3}	[6]
(Romania) E Bogdan (Romania) A Cadanțu	6	6
(France) A Cornet (France) P Parmentier	3	0
(Argentina) M Auroux (Argentina) M Irigoyen	6	4	[9]
WC	(Serbia) J Janković (Serbia) A Krunić	1	6	[11]
(Spain) I Ferrer Suárez (Spain) A Parra Santonja	3	5
2	(Hungary) T Babos (Luxembourg) M Minella	6	7

Semifinals
1	(Czech Republic) E Birnerová (Russia) A Panova	6	6
(Romania) E Bogdan (Romania) A Cadanțu	2	1
WC	(Serbia) J Janković (Serbia) A Krunić	3	2
2	(Hungary) T Babos (Luxembourg) M Minella	6	6

Final
1	(Czech Republic) E Birnerová (Russia) A Panova	4	3
2	(Hungary) T Babos (Luxembourg) M Minella	6	6
