= Caroline Garcia =

French tennis player (born 1993)

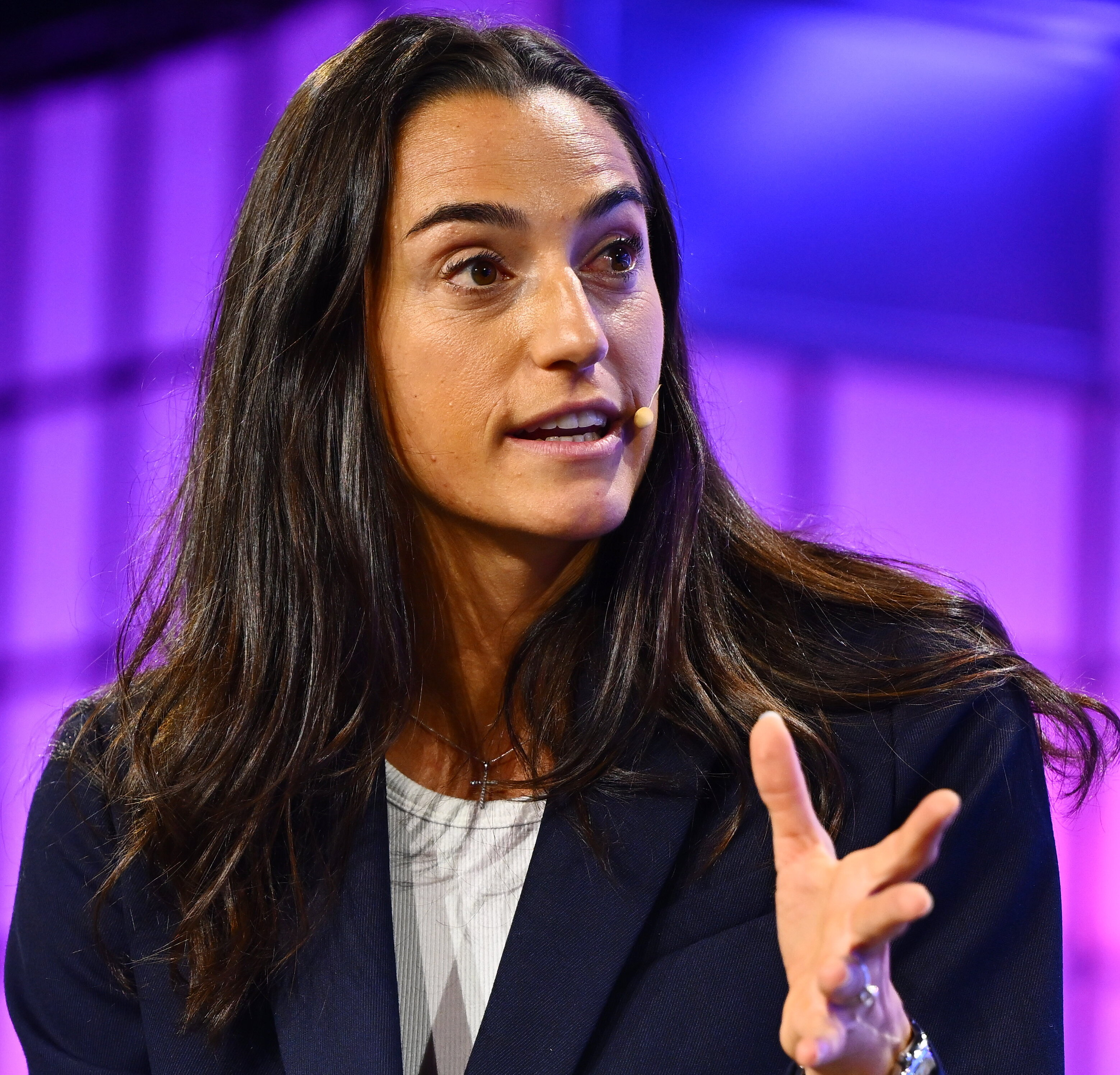
- Garcia at the 2025 Web Summit
- Country (sports): France
- Residence: Lyon, France
- Born: 16 October 1993 (age 33) Saint-Germain-en-Laye, France
- Height: 5 ft 10 in (178 cm)
- Turned pro: 2011
- Retired: 25 August 2025
- Plays: Right-handed (two-handed backhand)
- Prize money: US$ 18,778,616: 33rd in all-time rankings
- Official website: caro-garcia.com

Singles
- Career record: 470–361
- Career titles: 11
- Highest ranking: No. 4 (10 September 2018)

Grand Slam singles results
- Australian Open: 4R (2018, 2023)
- French Open: QF (2017)
- Wimbledon: 4R (2017, 2022)
- US Open: SF (2022)

Other tournaments
- Tour Finals: W (2022)
- Olympic Games: 2R (2016)

Doubles
- Career record: 191–119
- Career titles: 8
- Highest ranking: No. 2 (24 October 2016)

Grand Slam doubles results
- Australian Open: SF (2017)
- French Open: W (2016, 2022)
- Wimbledon: QF (2016, 2023)
- US Open: F (2016)

Other doubles tournaments
- Tour Finals: SF (2016)
- Olympic Games: 2R (2024)

Grand Slam mixed doubles results
- French Open: 1R (2015, 2021)
- Wimbledon: 2R (2015)

Other mixed doubles tournaments
- Olympic Games: 1R (2016, 2024)

Team competitions
- Fed Cup: W (2019)
- Hopman Cup: RR (2016)

Caroline Garcia (French pronunciation: [kaʁɔlin ɡaʁsja]; born 16 October 1993) is a French former professional tennis player and current podcaster and YouTuber. She had a career-high singles ranking of world No. 4 by the WTA, achieved on 10 September 2018 and a best doubles ranking of No. 2, reached on 24 October 2016. She has won a total of nineteen WTA Tour titles, eleven as a singles player and eight in doubles.

Garcia's most notable achievements in singles were the 2022 WTA Finals title and her three WTA 1000 level trophies, namely the 2017 Wuhan Open, 2017 China Open and 2022 Cincinnati Open. She was also a two-time major champion in doubles, having won the French Open women's doubles title in 2016 and 2022 with countrywoman Kristina Mladenovic. The pair were also runners-up at the 2016 US Open, reached the semifinals at the 2017 Australian Open and were champions at the 2016 Madrid Open. As a result of that successful partnership, they qualified for the WTA Finals on two occasions and were voted the 2016 WTA Doubles Team of the Year.

Garcia represented France in the Fed Cup since 2013, and was part of the team that won the title in 2019. She won a Fed Cup Heart Award in 2016 for her role in leading France to its first final in eleven years. She also twice competed for France at the Summer Olympics, 2016 and 2024.

== Personal life ==
Caroline Garcia was born in Saint-Germain-en-Laye, in the Yvelines département, but moved with her family to Bron, a suburb of Lyon, shortly after. She is the only child of Mylène and French Algeria-born Louis-Paul Garcia, a former sales manager whose grandparents originate from the Spanish Costa Blanca region. Until 2021, Garcia was trained by her father.

In 2023, Garcia opened up about her struggles with bulimia nervosa following a foot injury and a loss of form. She stated that conversations with family and friends, as well as a break from tennis, helped her to overcome bulimia, and to develop a healthy relationship with food once again.

On 19 July 2025, she married Borja Duran, an entrepreneur from Barcelona, with whom she hosts a podcast called The Tennis insider Club, that focuses on tennis.

On March 29, 2026, the couple announced via X that they were expecting their first child, a boy.

== Career ==
=== Juniors ===
As a junior, Garcia reached the semifinals of the Australian Open, French Open and Wimbledon, and the finals of the US Open, losing to Grace Min, all in 2011. She reached her highest junior ranking of 5, on 12 December 2011.

=== 2011 ===
At the Australian Open, she earned a wild card and beat Varvara Lepchenko in the first round in a three-set match in her first appearance in the main draw of a WTA tournament. However, she lost to Ayumi Morita in the second round in straight sets. (Note: To obtain data from this reference, select the corresponding year on the WTA or ITF website.)

Garcia made entry into the French Open as a wildcard. She played Zuzana Ondrášková and defeated her in straight sets. In the second round, she had a 6–3, 4–1, 15–0 lead against former No. 1, Maria Sharapova, who then won eleven games in a row. Garcia garnered a lot of respect for her talent. Andy Murray said the following via his Twitter account: "The girl Sharapova is playing is going to be number one in the world one day ... what a player".

=== 2013 ===
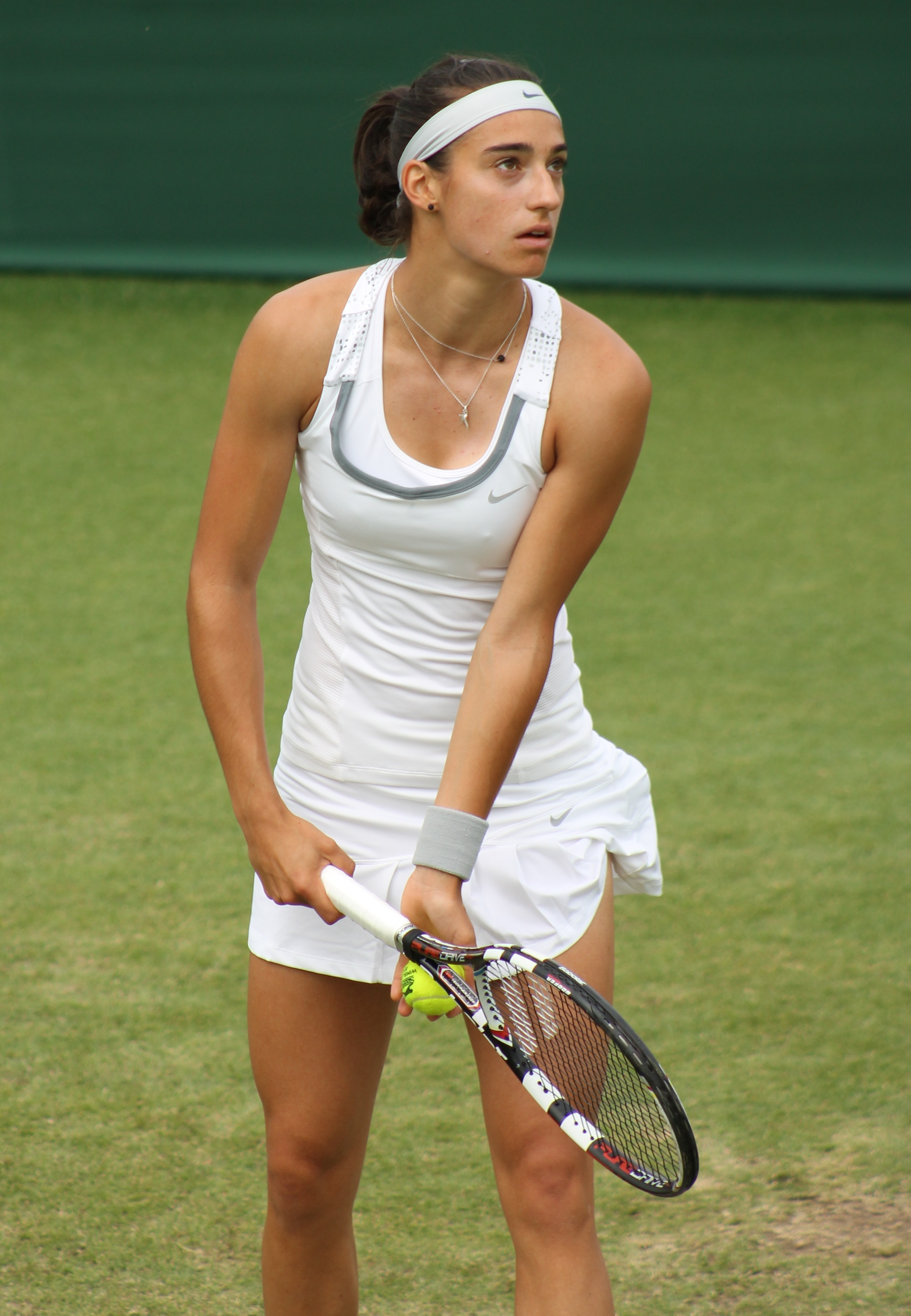
Garcia at the 2013 Wimbledon Championships

At the Australian Open, Garcia lost in the first round to No. 47 Elena Vesnina. She then beat qualifier Yuliya Beygelzimer, before losing to eventual champion, Serena Williams, at the French Open. She qualified for Wimbledon. This marks the first Grand Slam for which she qualified; she received a wild card for the previous five. Garcia beat Zheng Jie in the first round, before losing again to Serena Williams in the second round.

She was ranked high enough to gain direct entry to the main draw of the US Open, and beat American wildcard player Shelby Rogers in the first round, before losing to 30th seed Laura Robson. Her first round win meant that Garcia reached the world's top 70 for the first time.

=== 2014: Maiden WTA Tour titles ===
At the Sony Open, Garcia was the only player to win a set against Serena Williams, as Williams was on her way toward winning her seventh title and setting the record for the most titles held by a man or woman at the tournament. At the Copa Claro Colsanitas in Bogotá, Colombia, Garcia won her maiden WTA Tour singles title, beating the defending champion and former world No. 1, Jelena Janković, winning in straight sets.

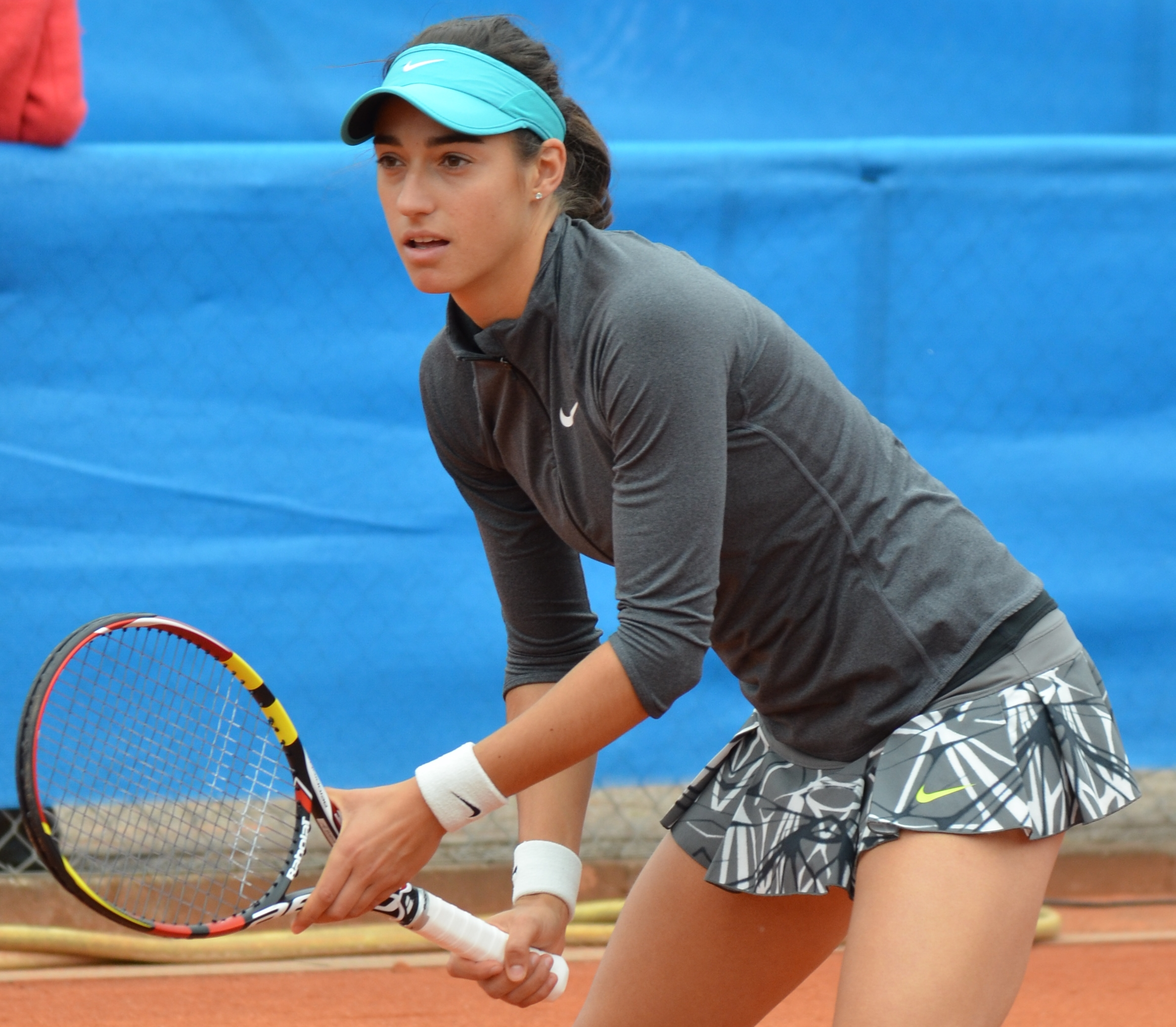
Garcia at the 2014 Nürnberger Versicherungscup

At the Madrid Open in May, Garcia reached the quarterfinals of any Premier event for the first time, defeating Angelique Kerber in the first round when the German retired with a lower back injury, receiving a walkover from Maria Kirilenko after the Russian withdrew with a wrist injury, and then defeating tenth seed Sara Errani in three sets. She eventually lost to third seed Agnieszka Radwańska in the quarterfinals, in three sets. Garcia lost in the first round of the French Open to Ana Ivanovic.

Garcia made the third round of the Wimbledon, eventually losing to Ekaterina Makarova. She lost early at the US Open to American Nicole Gibbs. Garcia rebounded at the Wuhan Open, defeating Venus Williams and Agnieszka Radwańska back to back, in final-set tiebreaks. She also defeated American CoCo Vandeweghe in straight sets to reach the quarterfinals, where she was defeated by eventual champion Petra Kvitová. Despite the loss, Garcia moved up to a career high of No. 36 in the rankings.

=== 2015: Two more singles finals ===
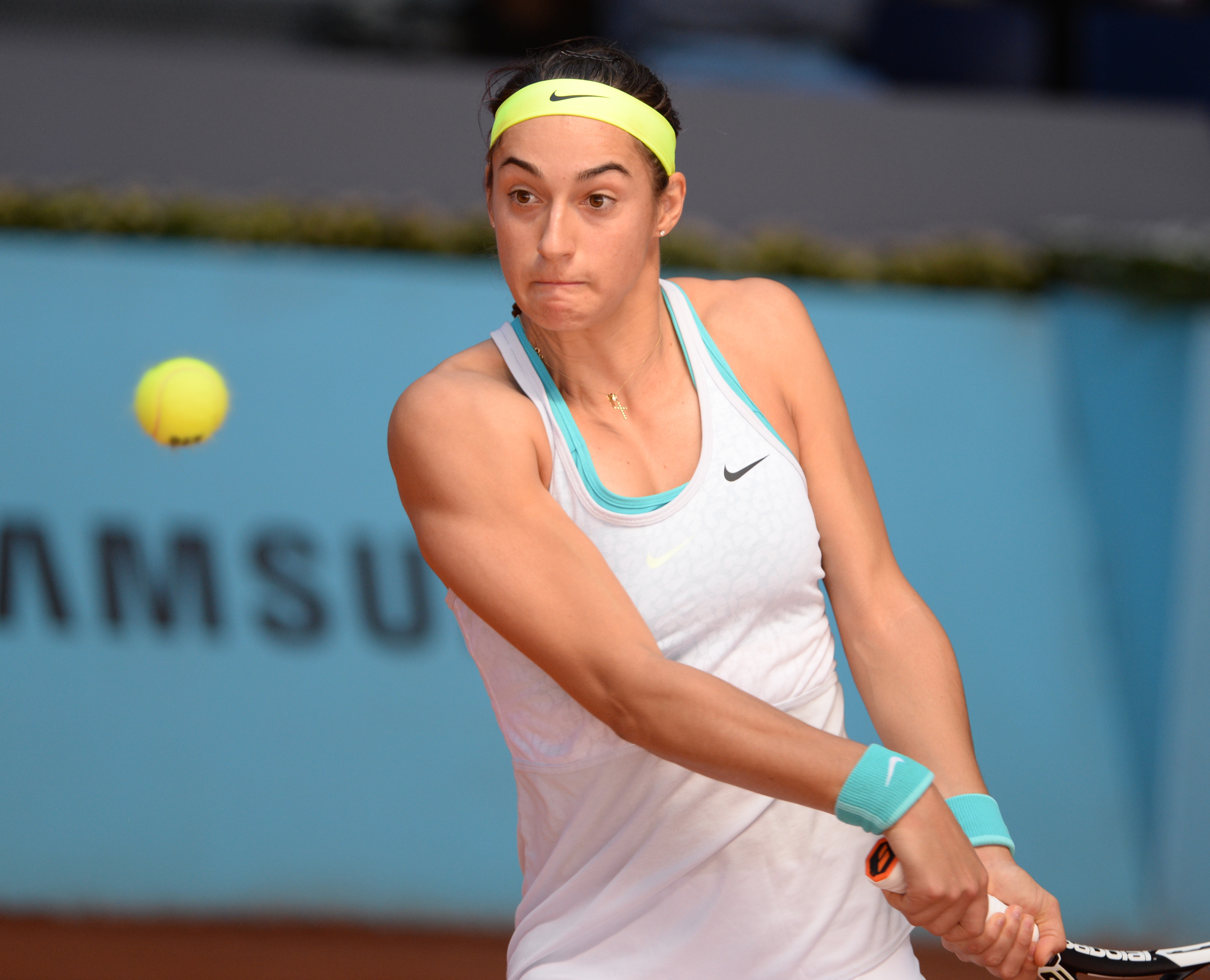
Garcia at the 2015 Mutua Madrid Open

Garcia began her season at the Brisbane International where she lost in the first round to No. 3 seed Angelique Kerber. She then played at the Australian Open where she beat No. 27 seed Svetlana Kuznetsova and Stefanie Vögele before losing to Eugenie Bouchard in the third round. After her campaign, Garcia joined France's Fed Cup team for their tie against Italy. Despite losing to Sara Errani, Garcia managed to grab a win as she beat Camila Giorgi in three sets as her country advanced to the semifinals.

At the Dubai Tennis Championships, Garcia lost in the second round to Agnieszka Radwańska after beating qualifier Arina Rodionova in straight sets. She followed that with a run to the finals at the Mexican Open, receiving a walkover from Maria Sharapova in the semis as the Russian withdrew due to illness. She then lost to Timea Bacsinszky. Garcia also reached the finals of the Monterrey Open where she also was a runner-up to Bacsinszky. She grabbed her first win over former world No. 1, Ana Ivanovic, en route.

After receiving a first round-bye at Indian Wells, Garcia beat qualifier Polona Hercog before grabbing her second straight win over Ivanovic in three sets. She then lost to eventual semifinalist Sabine Lisicki.

=== 2016: French Open champion in doubles ===
Garcia represented France at the 2016 Hopman Cup alongside Kenny de Schepper. She was undefeated in her singles matches, beating Heather Watson, Sabine Lisicki, and eventual champion Daria Gavrilova. Garcia and de Schepper were beaten in all of their mixed doubles matches. At the Sydney International, Garcia defeated Kristina Mladenovic, but lost in three sets to eventual semifinalist Simona Halep. She then fell short in the first round of the Australian Open, losing to Barbora Strýcová in straight sets.

At the Fed Cup, however, Garcia rebounded and helped France in their tie against Italy, earning singles wins over Sara Errani and Camila Giorgi. In her next tournament, the Dubai Tennis Championships, she lost her singles semifinal match, defeating Anna Karolína Schmiedlová, Carla Suárez Navarro and Andrea Petkovic en route. Two weeks later, she reached her second WTA Tour singles semifinals of the year at the tournament in Monterrey, losing her semifinal match to Heather Watson. Garcia then lost in her opening match in Indian Wells to Christina McHale. Her next tournament was the Miami Open, where she beat Mirjana Lučić-Baroni and Andrea Petkovic before losing in three sets to eventual finalist Svetlana Kuznetsova.

She then played in Charleston, losing her first-round match to Irina-Camelia Begu. However, Garcia won the doubles title alongside Kristina Mladenovic.

Playing for France in the Fed Cup semifinal, Garcia lost her first match against Kiki Bertens in straight sets, but managed to beat Arantxa Rus. France eventually won the tie after the doubles match, in which Garcia once again played with Mladenovic. Her next tournament was the Porsche Tennis Grand Prix, where, despite another first-round defeat in the singles to Monica Niculescu, she won another title in doubles with Mladenovic after beating top-seeds Martina Hingis and Sania Mirza in the final.

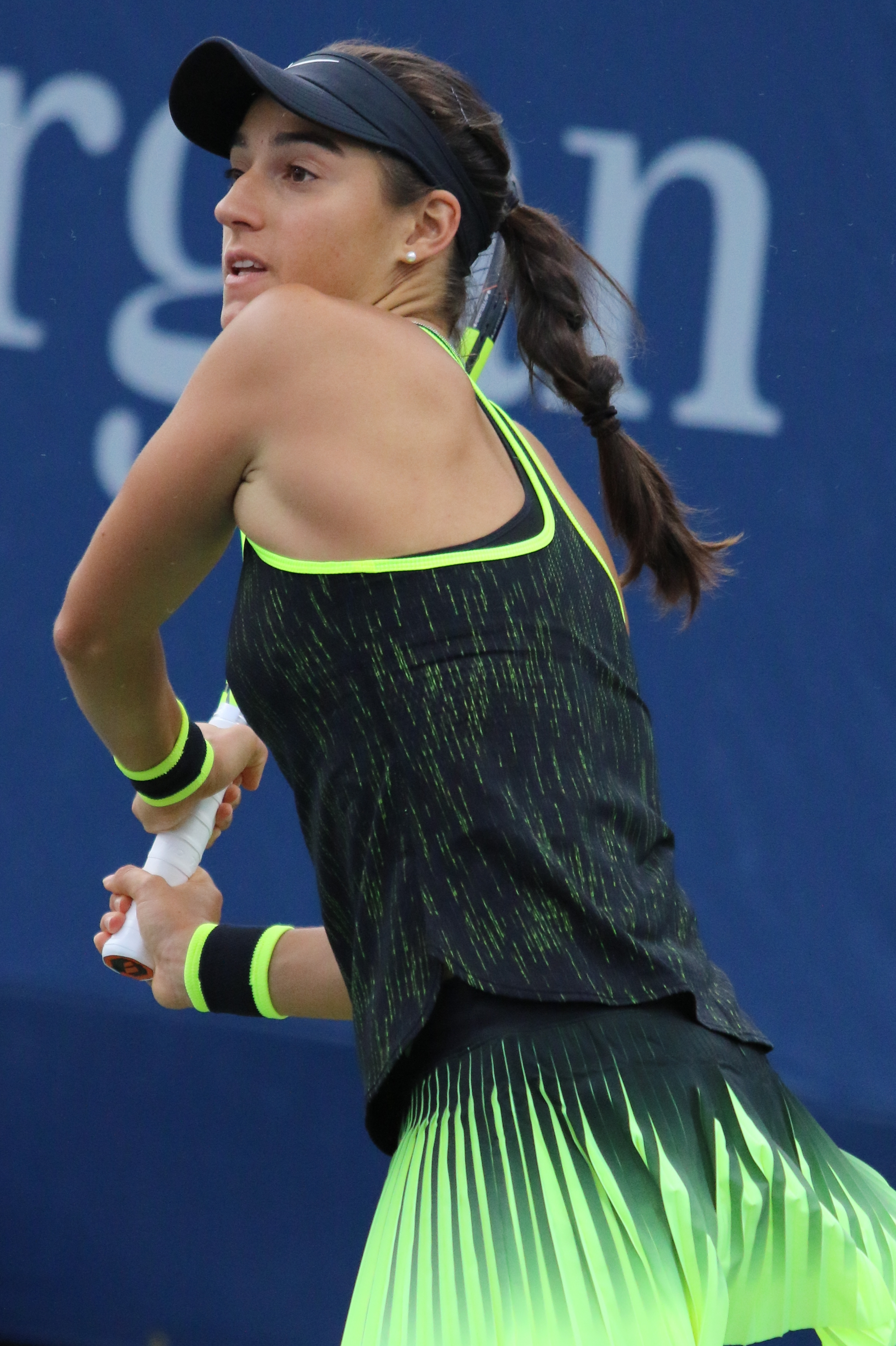
Garcia at the 2016 US Open

In May, Garcia won her first Premier 5 doubles title at the Madrid Open, partnering Mladenovic. In the same month, Garcia won the Internationaux de Strasbourg singles title by defeating Mirjana Lučić-Baroni in straight sets in the final, becoming only the third Frenchwoman to win that title since it became a WTA event in 1987.

At the French Open, Garcia won the women's doubles event partnering Mladenovic, beating Ekaterina Makarova and Elena Vesnina in the final. It was the first Grand Slam women's doubles crown for Garcia and Mladenovic and they became the first all-French pair to win the French Open women's doubles title since Gail Chanfreau and Françoise Dürr in 1971.

On 19 June, Garcia won her second WTA singles title of 2016 and her first on grass by beating Anastasija Sevastova in straight sets in the final of the inaugural Mallorca Open. She had defeated a pair of former Wimbledon singles semifinalists in Ana Ivanovic and Kirsten Flipkens to reach the final. On 20 June, she returned to No. 32 of the singles rankings and replaced Kristina Mladenovic as the French singles No. 1.

Garcia participated in both the women's singles and women's doubles of the 2016 Summer Olympics. Garcia and Kristina Mladenovic, seeded No. 2, lost in the first round of the women's doubles.

At the US Open, Garcia was seeded No. 25 in singles. She reached the third round of the draw, defeating Kiki Bertens and Kateřina Siniaková before falling to the fourth-seeded Agnieszka Radwańska. As a result, Garcia reached a career-high ranking of 24. In the doubles event, Garcia yet again partnered with Mladenovic. The Frenchwomen were the No. 1 seed of the event. They reached the final, where they were defeated by Bethanie Mattek-Sands and Lucie Šafářová. As a result of reaching the final, Garcia and Mladenovic qualified for the WTA Finals as second doubles team.

Garcia kicked off the Asian swing at the Wuhan Open. She was scheduled to play singles at the Guangzhou Open one week earlier, but withdrew before the tournament started. In Wuhan, Garcia played in both singles and doubles. In singles, she was defeated in the second round by No. 8 seed Madison Keys. In doubles, Garcia and Mladenovic, the No. 1 seeds, lost their opening second round to Christina McHale and Peng Shuai. Next, at the China Open, Garcia reached the third round of the singles draw, before falling to Daria Gavrilova. In doubles, she was once again top-seeded with Mladenovic. The French team fought their way to the final, defeating third-seeds, Chan Hao-ching and Chan Yung-jan, in the semifinals. This was Garcia and Mladenovic's eighth final together. They would end up losing to Mattek-Sands and Šafářová, the US Open champions.

Garcia ended her run in Asia at the Hong Kong Open, where she was seeded No. 5 in singles. She passed the first round before losing to her doubles rival, Bethanie Mattek-Sands, in the second round. She also played singles at her last regular-season tournament of the year, the Luxembourg Open, where she was seeded fourth. She had a hard-fought match against Anett Kontaveit, and just barely won. She was then defeated by Andrea Petkovic.

Garcia and Mladenovic received the WTA Award for Best Doubles Team of the Year shortly before the start of the WTA Finals. Garcia also won the Heart Award for the Fed Cup World Group semifinals stage. At the finals, Garcia and Mladenovic started strong, defeating Julia Görges and Karolína Plíšková in the quarterfinals. However, in the semifinals, they were once again defeated by their rivals, Bethanie Mattek-Sands and Lucie Šafářová. Garcia and Mladenovic missed the chance to become the WTA year-end doubles world number-ones.

Garcia made a last-minute appearance at the WTA Elite Trophy. She was originally one place short of qualifying, but was able to join the tournament when Venus Williams withdrew. She played in the Azalea Group against Johanna Konta and Samantha Stosur. Garcia won her first match against Stosur, but lost her second match against Konta, the top-seed, and thus did not reach the semifinals. However, she walked away with a year-end ranking of 23, her best ranking yet.

In the Fed Cup final in November against the Czech Republic, Garcia defeated two-time Wimbledon champion Petra Kvitová, then upset US Open finalist and Czech No. 1, Karolína Plíšková. Unfortunately, Garcia and Mladenovic then lost their doubles rubber against Pliskova and Strýcová, which meant that the Czech won the Fed Cup final 3–2.

In December, Garcia and Mladenovic were named the doubles ITF World Champions of 2016.

=== 2017: French Open quarterfinal, Asian Premier double champion, top 10 ===
During the off-season, Garcia announced that she would not play in the 2017 Fed Cup, explaining that she wanted to focus on her singles career.

Garcia's first tournament of the year was the Australian Open, in which she was the 21st seed. In the first round of the singles event, she defeated Kateryna Bondarenko in straight sets. In the second round, she faced countrywoman Océane Dodin. Garcia lost the first set, but rallied back to win the match. She then lost in the third round to Barbora Strýcová. In the doubles event, Garcia paired up with Kristina Mladenovic, the French duo being the top seeds of the tournament. The pair won their first three matches to advance to the quarterfinals, in which they defeated Ashleigh Barty and Casey Dellacqua. Garcia and Mladenovic then lost in the semifinals to Andrea Hlaváčková and Peng Shuai.

Garcia moved on to the Taiwan Open, in which she was seeded No. 3. She won her opening match against Marina Erakovic, setting up an encounter with Mandy Minella in the second round, to whom she lost in straight sets. At the Qatar Ladies Open, Garcia won her first-round match against qualifier Madison Brengle, before falling to No. 2 seed Karolína Plíšková in straight sets in the second round. At the Dubai Championships, Garcia was seeded No. 15. She defeated Johanna Larsson in the first round, but lost to the 2016 Olympics singles gold medalist Monica Puig in the second round. Garcia's poor form continued in Kuala Lumpur, where seeded No. 3, she lost in the first round to the Russian qualifier Anna Kalinskaya.

Wanting to focus on her singles success, Garcia ended her partnership with Mladenovic. However, she still played doubles at the Indian Wells Open, partnering Karolína Plíšková instead. In the singles, Garcia received a bye into the second round, as she was seeded No. 21. She defeated lucky loser Evgeniya Rodina, upset No. 11th seed Johanna Konta in the third round before losing to eventual finalist Svetlana Kuznetsova in the fourth round. Prior to the Miami Open, Garcia lost her status as the top-ranked Frenchwoman in singles to Mladenovic. In that tournament, Garcia was seeded No. 21 and lost her opening match to Peng Shuai in the second round. As the No. 3 seed at the Monterrey Open, Garcia reached the semifinals where she lost to eventual champion Anastasia Pavlyuchenkova.

Garcia began her clay season at the Madrid Open where she lost in the first round to the qualifier Wang Qiang. She also had an early exit at her next event, falling in the second round of the Italian Open to Daria Gavrilova, having beaten Donna Vekić in the first round. She was also beaten by Gavrilova in the semi-finals of the Internationaux de Strasbourg.

At the French Open, Garcia beat Nao Hibino, Chloé Paquet, Hsieh Su-wei and Alizé Cornet to reach her first singles major quarterfinal, where she lost to the No. 2 seed Karolína Plíšková. Garcia reached a career-high ranking of No. 21 in the singles rankings.

Garcia continued her good form at Wimbledon by reaching the fourth round for the first time, where she lost to the No. 6 seed, Johanna Konta, in three tight sets. She then reached the singles semifinals in Mallorca and Båstad and the singles quarterfinals at the Rogers Cup and Pan Pacific Open.

Garcia won her first career Premier-5 singles title at the Wuhan Open. It was the biggest singles title won by any French female player since Marion Bartoli won Wimbledon in 2013. At Wuhan, the unseeded Garcia defeated the No. 12 seed Angelique Kerber in the first round, registered her first victory of 2017 over a player ranked in the top 10 of the WTA singles rankings by beating the No. 7 seed Dominika Cibulková in the third round, and went on to defeat the unseeded Ashleigh Barty in three sets in the final. Garcia reached a career-high of No. 15 in the WTA singles rankings.

At the China Open, Garcia progressed to the quarterfinals defeating Elise Mertens and Cornet. She then saved a match point in her three-set victory over the third seed Elina Svitolina to reach the semifinals. She defeated Petra Kvitová in straight sets to reach her second consecutive WTA final, where she beat the newly crowned No. 1, Simona Halep, in straight sets, to win her first Premier-Mandatory title, becoming the first WTA player to win the Wuhan and China Open in the same year. After Johanna Konta pulled out of the Kremlin Cup, Garcia was confirmed to be the final qualifier for the WTA finals. Garcia lost her first match in the WTA Finals to Halep in straight sets, but then beat both Svitolina and Caroline Wozniacki in three sets to reach the semifinals, where she was defeated by Venus Williams.

=== 2018: Two major fourth rounds, world No. 4 ===
After starting her season in Brisbane, Garcia played at the Australian Open. The eighth seed, she advanced to the fourth round for the first time in her career before losing to Madison Keys.

Garcia reached the fourth round of her home slam at the French Open. She also reached the quarterfinals in Dubai and Doha, semifinals in Stuttgart and Madrid, as well as quarterfinals in Rome, Montreal, New Haven, and Tokyo. She reached a career-high ranking of world No. 4 on 10 September 2018 following her third round showing at the US Open.

She finished the year ranked No. 19 in the singles rankings.

=== 2019: Fed Cup champion ===
Garcia helped France win the 2019 Fed Cup. She reunited with Mladenovic to clinch the final doubles match against Ashleigh Barty and Sam Stosur of Australia.

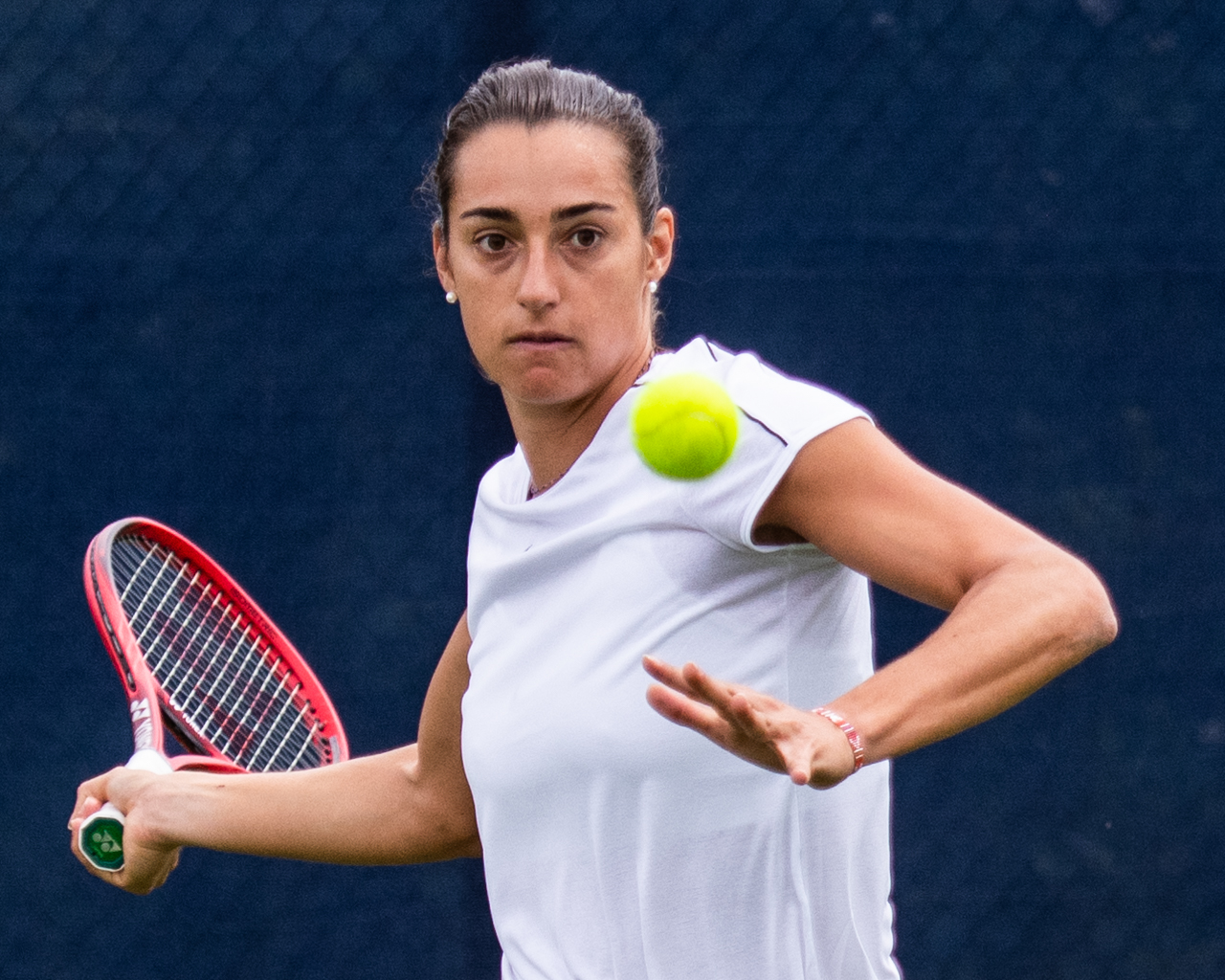
Garcia at the 2019 Nottingham Open

=== 2020: Mixed results, French Open fourth round ===
Garcia began the 2020 tennis season with average results, losing in the second round of the Australian Open to Ons Jabeur. However, at the US Open, Garcia reached the third round, beating top-seeded Karolína Plíšková in the second round.

She also achieved positive results at the postponed French Open, beating 17th seed Anett Kontaveit, Aliaksandra Sasnovich, and 16th seed Elise Mertens en route to the fourth round. Garcia was defeated by third seed Elina Svitolina in the fourth round. Garcia's best performance of 2020 was a quarterfinal finish at the Lyon Open, losing to the fifth seed Alison Van Uytvanck, in straight sets.

=== 2021: Loss of form, out of top 70 ===
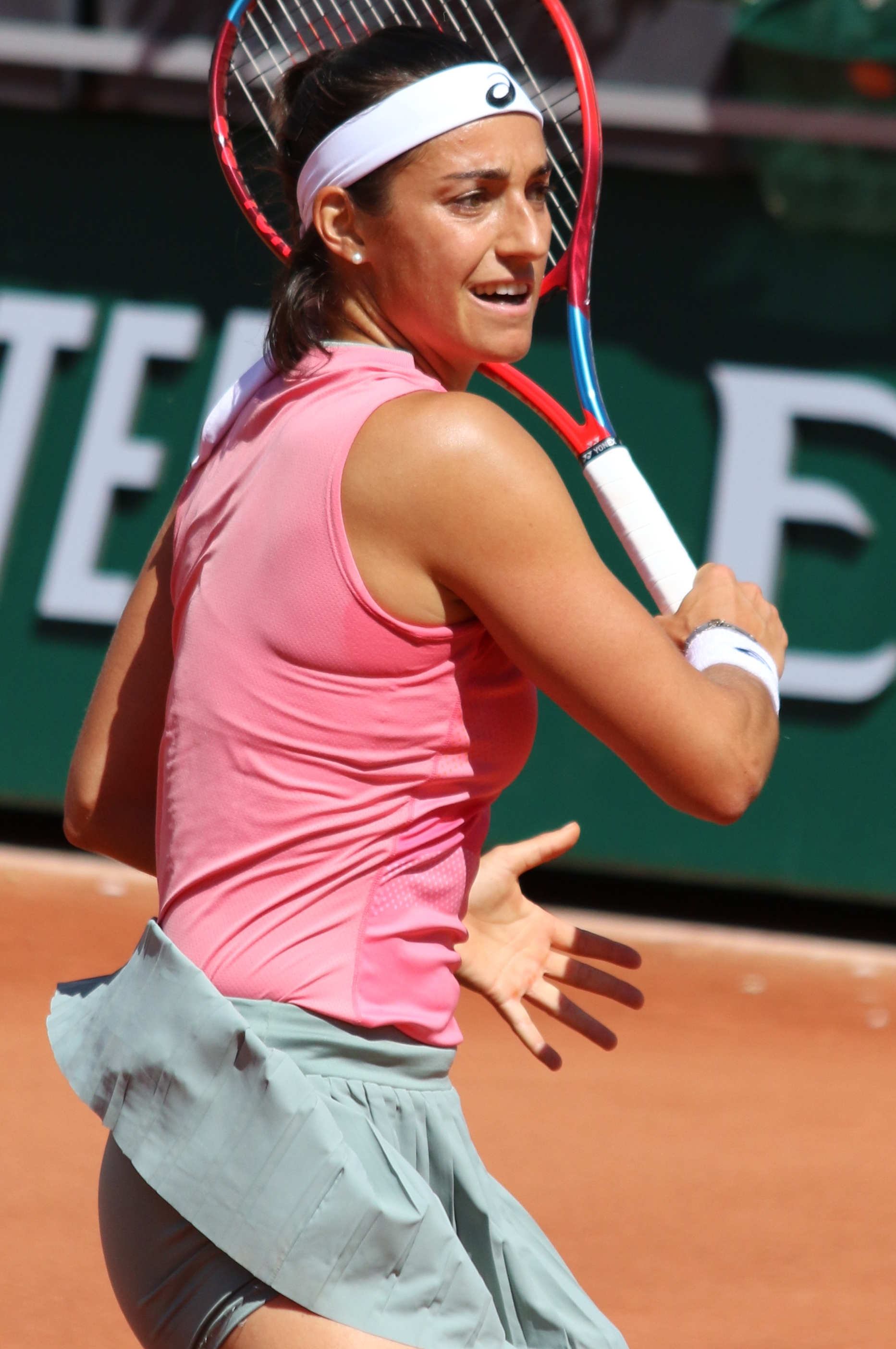
Garcia at the 2021 French Open

Garcia started her 2021 season at the first edition of the Gippsland Trophy. Seeded 12th, she reached the third round where she lost to seventh seed and eventual champion, Elise Mertens. At the Australian Open, she was defeated in the second round by third seed, 2019 champion, and eventual champion, Naomi Osaka. Seeded 10th at the first edition of the Phillip Island Trophy, she was eliminated in the first round by Misaki Doi. In Adelaide, she was beaten in her first-round match by Anastasija Sevastova.

Seeded third at the Lyon Open, Garcia lost in the second round to qualifier and eventual finalist, Viktorija Golubic. At the Dubai Championships, she beat Angelique Kerber in the first round. She was defeated in the third round by tenth seed Elise Mertens. In Miami, she faced third seed Simona Halep in the second round. She pushed Halep to three sets but ended up losing the match.

In May 2021, Garcia announced her new coach as Gabriel Urpí, thus ending a partnership with her father and long-time coach Louis-Paul Garcia. She started her clay-court season at the Italian Open. She was eliminated in the second round by Veronika Kudermetova. Seeded eighth at the first edition of the Emilia-Romagna Open in Parma, she reached the quarterfinals where she was beaten by Kateřina Siniaková. At the Internationaux de Strasbourg, she lost in the second round to fifth seed and eventual champion, Barbora Krejčíková. At French Open, she beat last year quarterfinalist Laura Siegemund, in the first round. She was defeated in the second round by Polona Hercog.

Kicking off her grass-court season at the Birmingham Classic, Garcia lost in the second round to eighth seed Marie Bouzková.

Her last match was at the Indian Wells Open in the beginning of October where she lost to Coco Gauff in the second round. She finished the season ranked No. 74 in the singles rankings.

She started working with a new coach Bertrand Perret in December.

=== 2022: WTA Finals champion, US Open semifinal, return to world No. 4 ===
At the French Open, she reached the final as a wildcard pair with compatriot Kristina Mladenovic. She won her second French Open in doubles, defeating Jessica Pegula and Coco Gauff in the final.

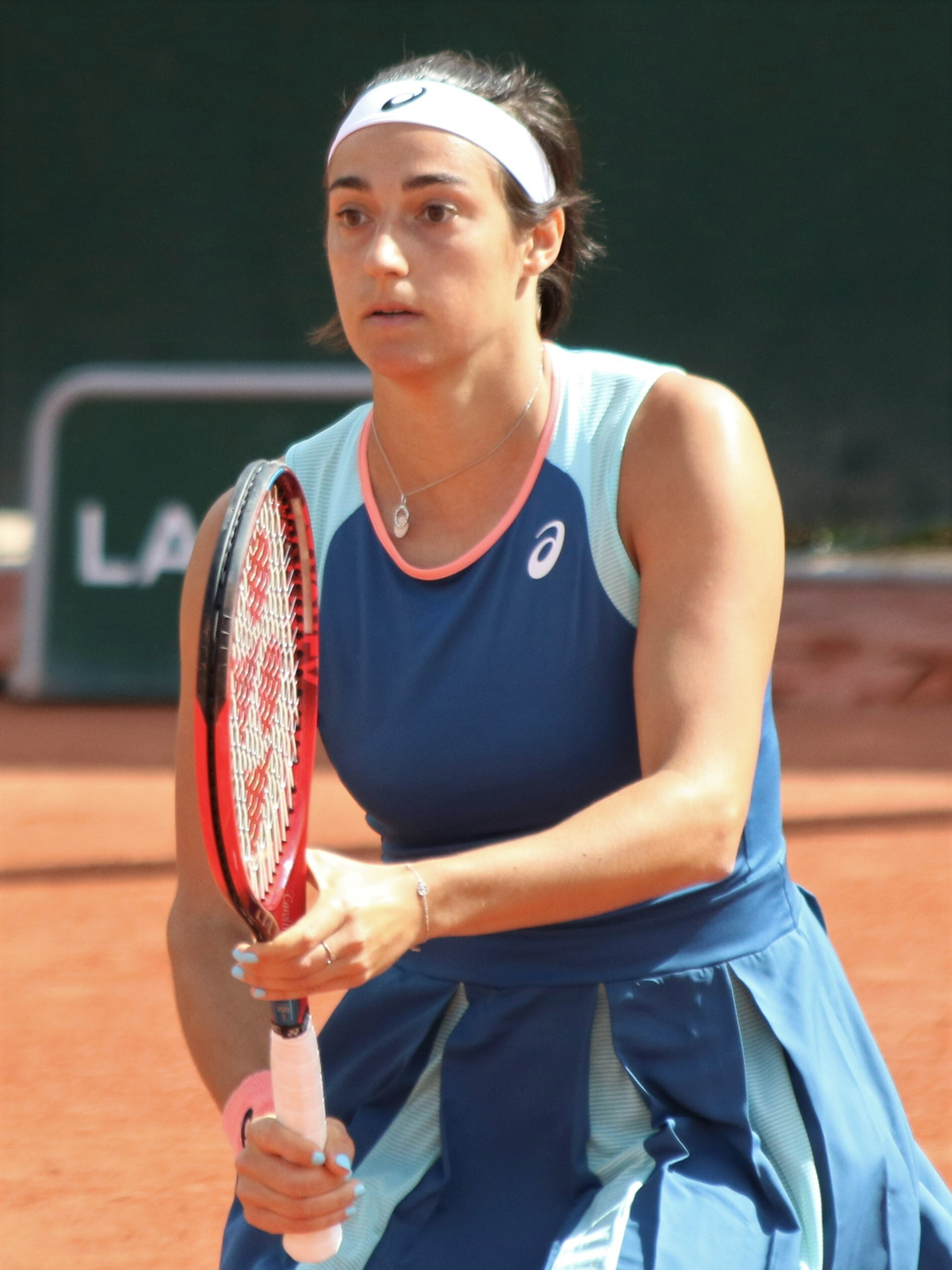
Garcia at the 2022 French Open

She secured her eighth career singles title in the leadup to Wimbledon at the Bad Homburg Open in the two longest matches of the tournament, over Alizé Cornet in the semifinals (2:45) and Bianca Andreescu in the final (2:42). At Wimbledon, she reached the fourth round only for a second time at this major.

At the Poland Open, Garcia upset the world No. 1, Iga Świątek, in the quarterfinals for her first win against a world No. 1 in ten attempts, ending Swiatek's 18 match win streak on clay in the process. She went on to win the tournament, defeating Ana Bogdan, in straight sets in the final, for her ninth title and second in two months.

At the Cincinnati Open, she reached the quarterfinals of a WTA 1000 for the first time in four years, since the Canadian Open in 2018, as a qualifier, defeating world No. 3 Maria Sakkari, her second top-3 win of 2022 and Elise Mertens. Next she defeated world No. 8 and seventh seed Jessica Pegula to reach her first WTA 1000 semifinal since Madrid in 2018, becoming the first qualifier to advance to the semifinals at this tournament since Akgul Amanmuradova in 2007. With her win over sixth seed Aryna Sabalenka she became the first qualifier to ever advance to a WTA 1000 final since the tier was created in 2009. She won her tenth title defeating Petra Kvitová in straight sets. As a result, she moved back into the top 20, at world No. 17.

Garcia entered the US Open as the 17th seed, on an eight-match winning streak dating back to the first round of qualifying in Cincinnati. She defeated lucky loser Kamilla Rakhimova, Anna Kalinskaya, 2019 champion Bianca Andreescu, and Alison Riske-Amritraj in the first four rounds to advance to the quarterfinals for the first time in her career at the US Open and the second time at a major. She defeated 12th seed Coco Gauff in the quarterfinals, but lost to fifth seed Ons Jabeur in straight sets in her first major semifinal, snapping a 13-match winning streak. As a result, she re-entered the top 10 in singles on 12 September 2022. In doubles, she reached the quarterfinals with compatriot Mladenovic.

She qualified for the WTA Finals by defeating Rebecca Marino in the first round of Guadalajara Open. One week before the start of WTA Finals, Bertrand Perret quit being her coach. Seeded sixth, she was placed in Group Tracy Austin of the WTA Finals. She defeated Maria Sakkari in the semifinal in straight sets. She proceeded to win the biggest title of her career defeating Aryna Sabalenka also in straight sets and moved back to her career-high world No. 4 in the singles rankings.

=== 2023: Major quarterfinal in doubles, WTA 1000 semifinal and two finals in singles ===
She was the top seed at the Lyon Open and the Monterrey Open but lost in the final, respectively to Alycia Parks and Donna Vekić.

At the French Open, she reached the quarterfinals in doubles with Luisa Stefani.

At the WTA 1000 Guadalajara Open, she reached the semifinals defeating tenth seed Viktoria Azarenka.

=== 2024: Paris Olympics, early end to season ===
At the beginning of the year, Garcia participated with Team France in the United Cup. where she won three of the four singles matches she participated, losing only to world No. 1, Iga Świątek. She then participated in Adelaide International, in which, in the singles bracket, she beat the wildcard entrant Taylah Preston in the first round in a three-set match, but lost in the second to Jelena Ostapenko, also in a three-set match with contradictory statistics. In the doubles bracket, her performance was much better, and with her usual partner Kristina Mladenovic they reached the final, which, however, they lost to the third seeds Beatriz Haddad Maia and Taylor Townsend in straight sets. Then Garcia entered directly into the Australian Open. She got past Naomi Osaka in the first round in straight sets. In the second round, the No. 16 seed was surprised by Magdalena Frech, losing the match in straight sets.

Continuing her campaign on hardcourts in the Middle East, Garcia participated in the Abu Dhabi Open, where she lost to Sorana Cîrstea in the first round in a three-set match.

On 27 September, Garcia announced she was ending her season early, after being left "exhausted" by anxiety and panic attacks.

=== 2025: Retirement ===
On 23 May 2025, Garcia announced she would retire from professional tennis after the forthcoming French Open and "a few" more unspecified tournaments that year. She lost in the first round at Roland Garros to Bernarda Pera in straight sets.

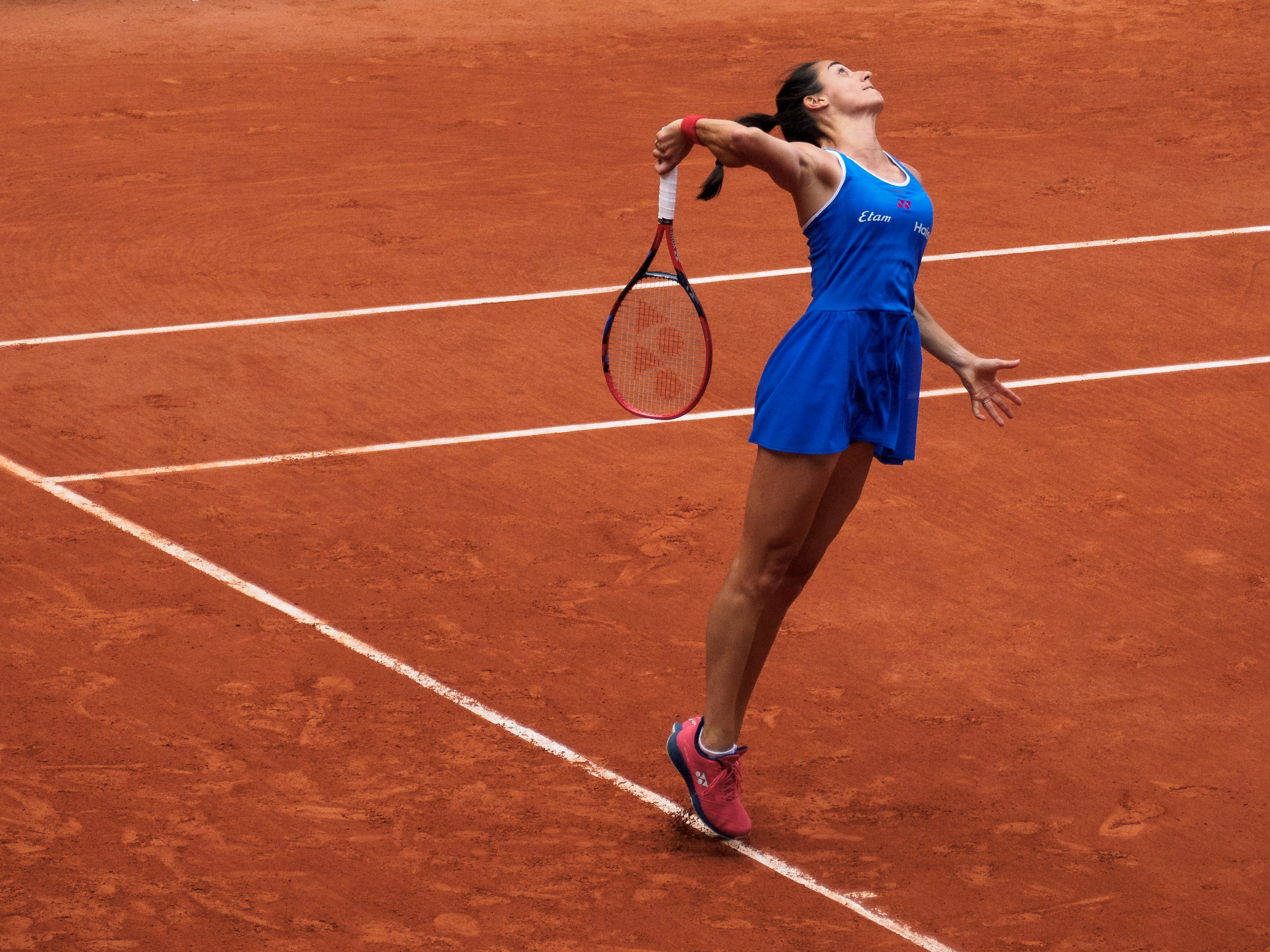
Garcia at the 2025 French Open

Her next appearance was as a wildcard entrant at the Cincinnati Open, where she defeated Sonay Kartal, before losing to seed 11th seed Karolína Muchová in the second round.

Garcia was given a wildcard into the main draw of the US Open. Having announced before the event that it would be her last professional tournament, she lost in the first round to Kamilla Rakhimova, in three sets.

In December 2025, Caroline Garcia declined a major sponsorship offer from an online betting company for her tennis podcast, citing ethical concerns.

== Playing style and coaching ==
Garcia was an offensive baseliner, with consistent and powerful groundstrokes, and a strong service game. Her forehand was her stronger wing, and she can hit many clean winners off it. She also possessed a consistent and strong two-handed backhand. She also had a strong first and second serve, known for its accuracy. She led the WTA Tour in 2022 and 2023 in the number of aces served (394 and 462, respectively). Her doubles success meant she also had a solid net game, although this was not frequently seen in her singles game. She had good movement and footwork around the court, which helped her with hitting her groundstrokes effectively.

Garcia's coaches included: Louis-Paul Garcia (–2021), Gabriel Urpí (2021), Juan Pablo Guzmán (–Apr 2023), and Bertrand Perret (2021–Oct 2022, Apr 2023–2024)

== Fly with Caro ==
During her professional career, Caroline Garcia became known for celebrating her victories with a distinctive gesture, spreading her arms and mimicking the motion of an airplane flying across the court. This signature celebration came to be popularly known as "Fly with Caro".

Garcia's on-court celebration originated during her participation at the 2014 Fed Cup, shortly after winning the title in Bogotá. The gesture was inspired when a French coach remarked that she was "flying on court".

According to Garcia, the celebration began humorously within the team during that week. After securing her first Fed Cup victory against the United States, she performed the gesture playfully. The phrase later gained popularity after fans created the hashtag "#FlyWithCaro", which Garcia embraced for its uniqueness and lighthearted nature.

The slogan "Fly with Caro" later took on a deeper significance, as a physiotherapist who was part of the team during that period passed away. Garcia has since continued the celebration as a tribute to his memory and the positive energy he brought to the team.

== Endorsements ==
Garcia is sponsored by Yonex for her clothing, by New Balance for her shoes, and by Yonex for her racquets. She uses the Yonex VCORE SV 100 racquet. Garcia is also a spokeswoman for Sothys, a French cosmetics company.

== Career statistics ==
=== Grand Slam tournament performance timelines ===
Key
W	F	SF	QF	#R	RR	Q#	DNQ	A	NH

(W) winner; (F) finalist; (SF) semifinalist; (QF) quarterfinalist; (#R) rounds 4, 3, 2, 1; (RR) round-robin stage; (Q#) qualification round; (DNQ) did not qualify; (A) absent; (NH) not held; (SR) strike rate (events won / competed); (W–L) win–loss record.
To avoid confusion and double counting, these charts are updated at the conclusion of a tournament or when the player's participation has ended.

==== Singles ====
Tournament	2010	2011	2012	2013	2014	2015	2016	2017	2018	2019	2020	2021	2022	2023	2024	2025	SR	W–L	Win%
Australian Open	A	2R	Q3	1R	1R	3R	1R	3R	4R	3R	2R	2R	1R	4R	2R	1R	0 / 14	16–14	53%
French Open	Q1	2R	1R	2R	1R	1R	2R	QF	4R	2R	4R	2R	2R	2R	2R	1R	0 / 15	18–15	55%
Wimbledon	A	Q2	Q1	2R	3R	1R	2R	4R	1R	1R	NH	1R	4R	3R	2R	A	0 / 11	13–11	54%
US Open	A	Q1	Q2	2R	1R	1R	3R	3R	3R	1R	3R	2R	SF	1R	1R	1R	0 / 13	15–13	54%
Win–loss	0–0	2–2	0–1	3–4	2–4	2–4	4–4	11–4	8–4	3–4	6–3	3–4	9–4	6–4	3–4	0–3	0 / 53	62–53	54%

==== Doubles ====
Tournament	2011	2012	2013	2014	2015	2016	2017	...	2021	2022	2023	SR	W–L	Win%
Australian Open	A	A	A	3R	3R	3R	SF		A	2R	A	0 / 5	11–5	69%
French Open	1R	1R	2R	1R	3R	W	A		A	W	A	2 / 7	15–5	75%
Wimbledon	A	A	Q1	2R	2R	QF	A		1R	A	QF	0 / 5	8–5	62%
US Open	A	A	2R	2R	QF	F	A		1R	QF	A	0 / 6	13–6	68%
Win–loss	0–1	0–1	2–2	4–4	8–4	16–3	4–1		0–2	10–2	3–1	2 / 23	47–21	69%

=== Grand Slam tournament finals ===
==== Doubles: 3 (2 titles, 1 runner-up) ====
Result	Year	Championship	Surface	Partner	Opponents	Score
Win	2016	French Open	Clay	(France) Kristina Mladenovic	(Russia) Ekaterina Makarova (Russia) Elena Vesnina	6–3, 2–6, 6–4
Loss	2016	US Open	Hard	(France) Kristina Mladenovic	(United States) Bethanie Mattek-Sands (Czech Republic) Lucie Šafářová	6–2, 6–7^{(5–7)}, 4–6
Win	2022	French Open (2)	Clay	(France) Kristina Mladenovic	(United States) Coco Gauff (United States) Jessica Pegula	2–6, 6–3, 6–2

=== Year-end championships finals ===
==== Singles: 1 (title) ====
Result	Year	Championship	Surface	Opponent	Score
Win	2022	WTA Finals, United States	Hard (i)	Aryna Sabalenka	7–6^{(7–4)}, 6–4

== Rivalries ==
Garcia has been involved in several notable rivalries throughout her career, with matches often marked by contrasting styles and close contests.

Garcia and Jasmine Paolini have met seven times on the WTA Tour, with Paolini leading their head-to-head 5–2. Their rivalry has grown in significance since 2023, producing several long and tactical matches on clay and hard courts. In 2024, Paolini defeated Garcia at the Madrid Open, a result widely covered by both *La Gazzetta dello Sport* and *L'Équipe*. Italian reports praised Paolini's precision and movement, while French coverage highlighted Garcia's persistence in trying to dictate play.

Garcia and Ons Jabeur have played five times on the main tour, with Jabeur leading 4–1. Their rivalry began during their junior years and was renewed in the 2022 US Open semi-finals, where Jabeur's variety and tactical awareness proved decisive.

Garcia and Petra Kvitová have faced each other nine times, with Kvitová leading 6–3. Their matches are known for their pace and power, as both favour first-strike tennis. Garcia beat Kvitová on her way to the Beijing title in 2017 and again in the 2022 Cincinnati final.

Garcia and Simona Halep have met eight times, with Halep holding a 5–3 edge. Their 2017 Beijing final remains the most significant of their meetings, with Garcia defeating the then-world No. 1 to claim the title and complete the Wuhan–Beijing double.

Garcia and Naomi Osaka have met five times, with Osaka leading 3–2. Their rivalry gained new energy following Osaka's return to the tour in 2024, as they split two high-profile meetings that season — Osaka winning in Doha and Garcia replying in Miami. Their contests have been described as "a clash of two uncompromising hitters, each trying to seize control from the very first strike."

== Notes ==
Awards and achievements
Preceded by (Switzerland) Martina Hingis & (India) Sania Mirza	WTA Doubles Team of the Year (with (France) Kristina Mladenovic); 2016	Succeeded by (Switzerland) Martina Hingis & (Chinese Taipei) Chan Yung-jan
Preceded by (Switzerland) Martina Hingis & (India) Sania Mirza	ITF Doubles World Champion (with (France) Kristina Mladenovic); 2016 WTA Tour	Succeeded by (Switzerland) Martina Hingis & (Chinese Taipei) Chan Yung-jan
