= 2013 Copa Colsanitas – Singles =

Singles
- 2013 Copa Colsanitas

Final
- Champion: (Serbia) Jelena Janković
- Runner-up: (Argentina) Paula Ormaechea
- Score: 6–1, 6–2

Details
- Draw: 32
- Seeds: 8

Events
Singles	Doubles
- Copa Colsanitas

Lara Arruabarrena Vecino was the defending champion, but lost to Karin Knapp in the quarterfinals.
Jelena Janković won the title, defeating Paula Ormaechea in the final, 6–1, 6–2.

== Seeds ==
1. (Serbia) Jelena Janković (champion)
2. (France) Alizé Cornet (second round)
3. (Spain) Lourdes Domínguez Lino (second round)
4. (Italy) Francesca Schiavone (second round)
5. (Italy) Flavia Pennetta (second round)
6. (Netherlands) Arantxa Rus (first round)
7. (France) Pauline Parmentier (first round)
8. (Hungary) Tímea Babos (second round)

== Draw ==
Key

- Q = Qualifier
- WC = Wild card
- LL = Lucky loser
- Alt = Alternate
- ITF = ITF entry
- PR = Protected ranking
- SR = Special ranking
- SE = Special exempt
- JE = Junior exempt
- JR = Junior Accelerator Programme entrant
- CO = College Accelerator Programme entrant
- NG = Next Gen Accelerator Program entrant
- w/o = Walkover
- r = Retired
- d = Defaulted

=== Finals ===
Semifinals
1	(Serbia) Jelena Janković	3	6	7^{7}
(Italy) Karin Knapp	6	1	6^{2}
(Argentina) Paula Ormaechea	7^{7}	6
Q	(Brazil) Teliana Pereira	6^{5}	3

Final
1	(Serbia) Jelena Janković	6	6
(Argentina) Paula Ormaechea	1	2

=== Top half ===
First round
1	(Serbia) J Janković	6	5	6
(United States) J Cohen	4	7	2
(Spain) E Cabeza Candela	3	6	4
WC	(Colombia) M Duque Mariño	6	3	6
(Portugal) MJ Koehler	0	3
(Romania) A Cadanțu	6	6
Q	(Croatia) T Mrdeža	7^{7}	6
7	(France) P Parmentier	6^{5}	4
3	(Spain) L Domínguez Lino	3	6	6
WC	(Colombia) C Castaño	6	2	1
(Czech Republic) E Birnerová	1	1
(Italy) K Knapp	6	6
(Spain) L Arruabarrena Vecino	6	1	6
WC	(Colombia) Y Lizarazo	2	6	3
(Russia) A Panova	6	3	3
5	(Italy) F Pennetta	4	6	6

Second round
1	(Serbia) J Janković	6	6
WC	(Colombia) M Duque Mariño	3	2
(Romania) A Cadanțu	4	6	6
Q	(Croatia) T Mrdeža	6	3	4
3	(Spain) L Domínguez Lino	3	6	4
(Italy) K Knapp	6	4	6
(Spain) L Arruabarrena Vecino	6	4	6
5	(Italy) F Pennetta	3	6	0

Quarterfinals
1	(Serbia) J Janković	6	6
(Romania) A Cadanțu	2	1
(Italy) K Knapp	6	6
(Spain) L Arruabarrena Vecino	3	3

Semifinals
1	(Serbia) J Janković	3	6	7^{7}
(Italy) K Knapp	6	1	6^{2}

=== Bottom half ===
First round
6	(Netherlands) A Rus	4	3
(Spain) MT Torró Flor	6	6
(Canada) S Dubois	4	6	3
(France) M Johansson	6	2	6
(Russia) N Bratchikova	5	2
(Argentina) P Ormaechea	7	6
Q	(Canada) S Fichman	6	4	4
4	(Italy) F Schiavone	4	6	6
8	(Hungary) T Babos	6	1	7^{7}
Q	(Spain) B García Vidagany	4	6	6^{4}
(Germany) T Malek	4	3
(Luxembourg) M Minella	6	6
(Austria) Y Meusburger	3	3
Q	(Brazil) T Pereira	6	6
(Ukraine) E Svitolina	2	6^{6}
2	(France) A Cornet	6	7^{8}

Second round
(Spain) MT Torró Flor	7^{7}	6
(France) M Johansson	6^{3}	3
(Argentina) P Ormaechea	2	6	7^{7}
4	(Italy) F Schiavone	6	3	6^{3}
8	(Hungary) T Babos	1	4
(Luxembourg) M Minella	6	6
Q	(Brazil) T Pereira	7	6^{2}	6
2	(France) A Cornet	5	7^{7}	2

Quarterfinals
(Spain) MT Torró Flor	1	5
(Argentina) P Ormaechea	6	7
(Luxembourg) M Minella	1	2
Q	(Brazil) T Pereira	6	6

Semifinals
(Argentina) P Ormaechea	7^{7}	6
Q	(Brazil) T Pereira	6^{5}	3

== Qualifying ==
=== Seeds ===
1. (Canada) Sharon Fichman (qualified)
2. (Canada) Eugenie Bouchard (second round)
3. (Germany) Dinah Pfizenmaier (qualifying competition)
4. (United Kingdom) Johanna Konta (second round)
5. (Italy) Nastassja Burnett (first round)
6. (Latvia) Anastasija Sevastova (qualifying competition)
7. (Spain) Laura Pous Tió (qualifying competition)
8. (Brazil) Teliana Pereira (qualified)

=== Qualifiers ===
1. (Canada) Sharon Fichman
2. (Spain) Beatriz García Vidagany
3. (Brazil) Teliana Pereira
4. (Croatia) Tereza Mrdeža

=== Draw ===
==== First qualifier ====
First round
1	(Canada) Sharon Fichman	6	6
(Italy) Corinna Dentoni	2	2
(United States) Alison Riske	6^{1}	6	2
(Paraguay) Verónica Cepede Royg	7^{7}	4	6
(Slovenia) Maša Zec Peškirič	6	7
(Venezuela) Adriana Pérez	3	5
(Romania) Elena Bogdan	4	5
7	(Spain) Laura Pous Tió	6	7

Second round
1	(Canada) Sharon Fichman	6	2	7
(Paraguay) Verónica Cepede Royg	2	6	5
(Slovenia) Maša Zec Peškirič	3	4
7	(Spain) Laura Pous Tió	6	6

Qualifying competition
1	(Canada) Sharon Fichman	6	7^{7}
7	(Spain) Laura Pous Tió	4	6^{5}

==== Second qualifier ====
First round
2	(Canada) Eugenie Bouchard	6	6
(Netherlands) Richèl Hogenkamp	4	0
(Poland) Paula Kania	1	4
(Spain) Arantxa Parra Santonja	6	6
(Ukraine) Kateryna Kozlova	6	5	4
(Switzerland) Amra Sadiković	2	7	6
(Spain) Beatriz García Vidagany	6^{1}	7^{7}	6
5	(Italy) Nastassja Burnett	7^{7}	6^{4}	2

Second round
2	(Canada) Eugenie Bouchard	4	5
(Spain) Arantxa Parra Santonja	6	7
(Switzerland) Amra Sadiković	5	1
(Spain) Beatriz García Vidagany	7	6

Qualifying competition
(Spain) Arantxa Parra Santonja	6	2	2
(Spain) Beatriz García Vidagany	3	6	6

==== Third qualifier ====
First round
3	(Germany) Dinah Pfizenmaier	6	6
(United States) Chiara Scholl	2	0
(France) Séverine Beltrame	6	7^{7}
WC	(Croatia) Ajla Tomljanović	3	6^{2}
(Spain) Inés Ferrer Suárez	5	3
(United States) Grace Min	7	6
WC	(United States) Nadia Echeverría Alam	6	4	0
8	(Brazil) Teliana Pereira	3	6	6

Second round
3	(Germany) Dinah Pfizenmaier	4	6	6
(France) Séverine Beltrame	6	3	1
(United States) Grace Min	5	2
8	(Brazil) Teliana Pereira	7	6

Qualifying competition
3	(Germany) Dinah Pfizenmaier	3	2
8	(Brazil) Teliana Pereira	6	6

==== Fourth qualifier ====
First round
4	(United Kingdom) Johanna Konta	6	6
WC	(United States) Nicole Melichar	4	3
WC	(Colombia) María Paulina Pérez García	2	2
(Croatia) Tereza Mrdeža	6	6
(Argentina) María Irigoyen	4	2
(Serbia) Aleksandra Krunić	6	6
(Argentina) Florencia Molinero	3	2
6	(Latvia) Anastasija Sevastova	6	6

Second round
4	(United Kingdom) Johanna Konta	6	6^{6}	3
(Croatia) Tereza Mrdeža	3	7^{8}	6
(Serbia) Aleksandra Krunić	2	6	3
6	(Latvia) Anastasija Sevastova	6	4	6

Qualifying competition
(Croatia) Tereza Mrdeža	6	6
6	(Latvia) Anastasija Sevastova	1	4
