= 2011 China Open – Men's singles qualifying =

This article displays the men's singles qualifying draw of the 2011 China Open (tennis).

== Players ==
=== Seeds ===
1. (Germany) Philipp Kohlschreiber (qualified)
2. (Spain) Albert Ramos (qualified)
3. (Italy) Flavio Cipolla (qualified)
4. (Brazil) João Souza (first round)
5. (Chile) Paul Capdeville (qualifying competition)
6. (Turkey) Marsel İlhan (qualified)
7. (Slovenia) Grega Žemlja (qualifying competition)
8. (Russia) Teymuraz Gabashvili (qualifying competition)

=== Qualifiers ===
1. (Germany) Philipp Kohlschreiber
2. (Spain) Albert Ramos
3. (Italy) Flavio Cipolla
4. (Turkey) Marsel İlhan

== Qualifying draw ==
=== First qualifier ===
First round
1	(Germany) Philipp Kohlschreiber	7^{8}	2	7^{8}
(South Africa) Rik De Voest	6^{6}	6	6^{6}
(Russia) Alexandre Kudryavtsev	6	4	2
7	(Slovenia) Grega Žemlja	3	6	6

Qualifying competition
1	(Germany) Philipp Kohlschreiber	6^{3}	7^{7}	7
7	(Slovenia) Grega Žemlja	7^{7}	6^{5}	5

=== Second qualifier ===
First round
2	(Spain) Albert Ramos	3	6	7
(Chinese Taipei) Yang Tsung-Hua	6	3	5
WC	(China) Gong Mao-Xin	2	1
8	(Russia) Teymuraz Gabashvili	6	6

Qualifying competition
2	(Spain) Albert Ramos	6	6
8	(Russia) Teymuraz Gabashvili	3	2

=== Third qualifier ===
First round
3	(Italy) Flavio Cipolla	6	3
(United States) Michael Yani	2	0^{r}
(Italy) Simone Bolelli	5	4
5	(Chile) Paul Capdeville	7	6

Qualifying competition
3	(Italy) Flavio Cipolla	6	6
5	(Chile) Paul Capdeville	3	3

=== Fourth qualifier ===
First round
4/WC	(Brazil) João Souza	5	3
(France) Florent Serra	7	6
WC	(China) Feng He	1	0
6	(Turkey) Marsel İlhan	6	6

Qualifying competition
(France) Florent Serra	6^{7}	2
6	(Turkey) Marsel İlhan	7^{9}	6
