= 2010 China Open (tennis) =

- Date: October 1–11
- Edition: 12th (ATP) / 14th (WTA)
- Category: ATP World Tour 500 (men); Premier Mandatory (women)
- Location: Beijing, China
- Venue: Olympic Green Tennis Center

Champions

Men's singles
- (Serbia) Novak Djokovic

Women's singles
- (Denmark) Caroline Wozniacki

Men's doubles
- (United States) Bob Bryan / (United States) Mike Bryan

Women's doubles
- (Chinese Taipei) Chuang Chia-jung / (Belarus) Olga Govortsova
← 2009 ·	China Open	· 2011 →

The 2010 China Open was a tennis tournament played on outdoor hard courts. It was the 12th edition of the China Open for the men (14th for the women), and is part of the ATP 500 Series of the 2010 ATP World Tour, and of the Premier Series of the 2010 WTA Tour. Both the men's and the women's events were held at the Olympic Green Tennis Center in Beijing, China, from October 1 through October 11, 2010. Due to rain the singles finals were postponed from Sunday, October 10 to Monday, October 11.

== Finals ==
=== Men's singles ===
(Serbia) Novak Djokovic defeated (Spain) David Ferrer, 6–2, 6–4

- It was Djokovic's 2nd title of the year and 18th of his career. It was his 2nd win at Beijing, defending his title.

=== Women's singles ===
(Denmark) Caroline Wozniacki defeated (Russia) Vera Zvonareva, 6–3, 3–6, 6–3

- It was Wozniacki's 6th title of the year and 12th of her career.

=== Men's doubles ===
(United States) Bob Bryan / (United States) Mike Bryan defeated (Poland) Mariusz Fyrstenberg / (Poland) Marcin Matkowski, 6–1, 7–6^{(7–5)}

=== Women's doubles ===
(Chinese Taipei) Chuang Chia-jung / (Belarus) Olga Govortsova defeated (Argentina) Gisela Dulko / (Italy) Flavia Pennetta, 7–6^{(7–2)}, 1–6, [10–7].

== WTA entrants ==
=== Seeds ===
Country	Player	Rank^{1}	Seed
DEN	Caroline Wozniacki	2	1
RUS	Vera Zvonareva	4	2
SRB	Jelena Janković	6	3
AUS	Samantha Stosur	7	4
ITA	Francesca Schiavone	8	5
POL	Agnieszka Radwańska	9	6
RUS	Elena Dementieva	10	7
BLR	Victoria Azarenka	11	8
CHN	Li Na	12	9
RUS	Svetlana Kuznetsova	13	10
FRA	Marion Bartoli	14	11
RUS	Maria Sharapova	15	12
RUS	Nadia Petrova	17	13
FRA	Aravane Rezaï	18	14
ISR	Shahar Pe'er	19	15
RUS	Anastasia Pavlyuchenkova	20	16

- ^{1} Rankings are as of September 27, 2010.

=== Other entrants ===
The following players received wildcards into the singles main draw:

- (China) Han Xinyun
- (China) Peng Shuai
- (China) Sun Shengnan
- (China) Zhang Shuai
- (China) Zhou Yimiao

The following players received entry from the qualifying draw:

- (Ukraine) Kateryna Bondarenko
- (Russia) Vera Dushevina
- (China) Lu Jingjing
- (Serbia) Bojana Jovanovski
- (Russia) Alla Kudryavtseva
- (Russia) Ekaterina Makarova
- (Latvia) Anastasija Sevastova
- (Italy) Roberta Vinci

== ATP entrants ==
=== Seeds ===
Country	Player	Rank^{1}	Seed
SRB	Novak Djokovic	2	1
GBR	Andy Murray	4	2
SWE	Robin Söderling	5	3
RUS	Nikolay Davydenko	6	4
CZE	Tomáš Berdych	7	5
ESP	Fernando Verdasco	8	6
RUS	Mikhail Youzhny	9	7
ESP	David Ferrer	11	8

- Rankings are as of September 27, 2010.

=== Other entrants ===
The following players received wildcards into the singles main draw:

- (China) Gong Maoxin
- (United States) John Isner
- (Chinese Taipei) Yang Tsung-hua

The following players received entry from the qualifying draw:

- (Germany) Michael Berrer
- (Poland) Łukasz Kubot
- (Ukraine) Illya Marchenko
- (France) Paul-Henri Mathieu
