= 2010 China Open – Men's singles =

Men's singles
- 2010 China Open

Final
- Champion: (Serbia) Novak Djokovic
- Runner-up: (Spain) David Ferrer
- Score: 6–2, 6–4

Events
Singles	men	women
Doubles	men	women
← 2009 ·	China Open	· 2011 →

Novak Djokovic was the defending champion and defended his title, defeating David Ferrer 6–2, 6–4 in the final.

== Seeds ==
1. (Serbia) Novak Djokovic (champion)
2. (United Kingdom) Andy Murray (quarterfinals)
3. (Sweden) Robin Söderling (quarterfinals)
4. (Russia) Nikolay Davydenko (quarterfinals)
5. (Czech Republic) Tomáš Berdych (first round)
6. (Spain) Fernando Verdasco (first round)
7. (Russia) Mikhail Youzhny (first round)
8. (Spain) David Ferrer (final)

== Draw ==
=== Key ===
- Q = Qualifier
- WC = Wild card
- LL = Lucky loser
- Alt = Alternate
- SE = Special exempt
- PR = Protected ranking
- ITF = ITF entry
- JE = Junior exempt
- w/o = Walkover
- r = Retired
- d = Defaulted
- SR = Special ranking

=== Finals ===
Semifinals
1	(Serbia) Novak Djokovic	7^{7}	6
WC	(United States) John Isner	6^{1}	2
8	(Spain) David Ferrer	6	4	6
(Croatia) Ivan Ljubičić	4	6	4

Final
1	(Serbia) Novak Djokovic	6	6
8	(Spain) David Ferrer	2	4

=== Top half ===
First round
1	(Serbia) N Djokovic	6	6
WC	(China) M Gong	1	3
(United States) M Fish	6	7^{7}
(Serbia) J Tipsarević	2	6^{5}
(France) G Simon	6	3	6
(United States) S Querrey	3	6	2
Q	(Germany) M Berrer	4	7	6
5	(Czech Republic) T Berdych	6	5	4
4	(Russia) N Davydenko	6	6
(Germany) F Mayer	3	4
(Croatia) M Čilić	6	6
(Brazil) T Bellucci	2	2
WC	(United States) J Isner	7^{7}	6
WC	(Chinese Taipei) T-h Yang	6^{5}	3
(Germany) P Kohlschreiber	6	7
6	(Spain) F Verdasco	2	5

Second round
1	(Serbia) N Djokovic	w/o
(United States) M Fish
(France) G Simon	6^{6}	6	7^{7}
Q	(Germany) M Berrer	7^{8}	4	6^{4}
4	(Russia) N Davydenko	7	7
(Croatia) M Čilić	5	5
WC	(United States) J Isner	7^{7}	3	6
(Germany) P Kohlschreiber	6^{3}	6	3

Quarterfinals
1	(Serbia) N Djokovic	6	6
(France) G Simon	3	2
4	(Russia) N Davydenko	6^{2}	4
WC	(United States) J Isner	7^{7}	6

Semifinals
1	(Serbia) N Djokovic	7^{7}	6
WC	(United States) J Isner	6^{1}	2

=== Bottom half ===
First round
8	(Spain) D Ferrer	6	6
(Uzbekistan) D Istomin	4	1
Q	(Ukraine) I Marchenko	4	6^{7}
(Chinese Taipei) Y-h Lu	6	7^{9}
(Spain) N Almagro	7	6
Q	(Poland) Ł Kubot	5	2
(Spain) T Robredo	6	1	4
3	(Sweden) R Söderling	4	6	6
7	(Russia) M Youzhny	3	6^{3}
(Croatia) I Ljubičić	6	7^{7}
(Ukraine) A Dolgopolov	6	6
(Cyprus) M Baghdatis	4	4
(Kazakhstan) A Golubev	2	0^{r}
(Spain) A Montañés	6	3
Q	(France) P-H Mathieu	2	3
2	(United Kingdom) A Murray	6	6

Second round
8	(Spain) D Ferrer	6	3	6
(Chinese Taipei) Y-h Lu	3	6	1
(Spain) N Almagro	5	6	3
3	(Sweden) R Söderling	7	4	6
(Croatia) I Ljubičić	6	7^{7}
(Ukraine) A Dolgopolov	3	6^{2}
(Spain) A Montañés	5	3
2	(United Kingdom) A Murray	7	6

Quarterfinals
8	(Spain) D Ferrer	6	6
3	(Sweden) R Söderling	2	4
(Croatia) I Ljubičić	6	6
2	(United Kingdom) A Murray	3	2

Semifinals
8	(Spain) D Ferrer	6	4	6
(Croatia) I Ljubičić	4	6	4

== Qualifying ==
=== Seeds ===
1. (Germany) Michael Berrer (qualified)
2. (Poland) Łukasz Kubot (qualified)
3. (South Africa) Kevin Anderson (first round)
4. (Ukraine) Illya Marchenko (qualified)
5. (United States) Michael Russell (qualifying competition)
6. (Poland) Michał Przysiężny (first round, retired due to left knee injury)
7. (Germany) Rainer Schüttler (qualifying competition)
8. (Russia) Teymuraz Gabashvili (qualifying competition)

=== Qualifiers ===
1. (Germany) Michael Berrer
2. (Poland) Łukasz Kubot
3. (France) Paul-Henri Mathieu
4. (Ukraine) Illya Marchenko

=== Draw ===
==== First qualifier ====
First round
1	(Germany) Michael Berrer	6	6
WC	(China) Wu Di	2	4
(Slovenia) Grega Žemlja	5	6	5
6	(Poland) Michał Przysiężny	7	1	3^{r}

Qualifying competition
1	(Germany) Michael Berrer	5	6	6
(Slovenia) Grega Žemlja	7	4	3

==== Second qualifier ====
First round
2	(Poland) Łukasz Kubot	7^{7}	6
(Israel) Harel Levy	6^{1}	3
(Finland) Harri Heliövaara	3	6^{2}
7	(Germany) Rainer Schüttler	6	7^{7}

Qualifying competition
2	(Poland) Łukasz Kubot	1	7	6
7	(Germany) Rainer Schüttler	6	5	3

==== Third qualifier ====
First round
3	(South Africa) Kevin Anderson	5	6^{5}
(France) Paul-Henri Mathieu	7	7^{7}
WC	(China) Chang Yu	0	5
8	(Russia) Teymuraz Gabashvili	6	7

Qualifying competition
(France) Paul-Henri Mathieu	6	6
8	(Russia) Teymuraz Gabashvili	3	3

==== Fourth qualifier ====
First round
4	(Ukraine) Illya Marchenko	6	6
WC	(China) Ma Ya-Nan	2	3
(China) Zhang Ze	3	2
5	(United States) Michael Russell	6	6

Qualifying competition
4	(Ukraine) Illya Marchenko	6	6
5	(United States) Michael Russell	2	2
