= 2009 China Open – Women's singles =

Women's singles
- 2009 China Open

Final
- Champion: (Russia) Svetlana Kuznetsova
- Runner-up: (Poland) Agnieszka Radwańska
- Score: 6–2, 6–4

Details
- Seeds: 16

Events
Singles	men	women
Doubles	men	women
← 2008 ·	China Open	· 2010 →

Svetlana Kuznetsova defeated Agnieszka Radwańska in the final, 6–2, 6–4 to win the women's singles tennis title at the 2009 China Open. It was her second China Open title.

Jelena Janković was the defending champion, but lost in the second round against Peng Shuai.

This tournament saw world No. 226 Zhang Shuai defeat then-world No. 1 Dinara Safina in the second round, and as such become the lowest-ranked player to ever defeat a reigning world No. 1. Serena Williams replaced Safina as world No. 1 following the tournament by virtue of winning her second round match, though Williams herself would lose in the third round.

== Seeds ==
1. (Russia) Dinara Safina (second round)
2. (United States) Serena Williams (third round)
3. (United States) Venus Williams (second round)
4. (Russia) Elena Dementieva (quarterfinals)
5. (Denmark) Caroline Wozniacki (first round)
6. (Russia) Svetlana Kuznetsova (champion)
7. (Russia) Vera Zvonareva (quarterfinals)
8. (Serbia) Jelena Janković (second round)
9. (Belarus) Victoria Azarenka (second round)
10. (Italy) Flavia Pennetta (third round)
11. (Serbia) Ana Ivanovic (withdrew due to upper respiratory tract infection)
12. (Poland) Agnieszka Radwańska (final)
13. (Russia) Nadia Petrova (semifinals)
14. (France) Marion Bartoli (semifinals)
15. (Australia) Samantha Stosur (first round)
16. (China) Li Na (third round)
17. (France) Virginie Razzano (withdrew due to left calf strain)

The four Tokyo semifinalists received a bye into the second round. They are as follows:

- (Russia) Maria Sharapova (third round)
- (Poland) Agnieszka Radwańska (final)
- (China) Li Na (third round)
- (Serbia) Jelena Janković (second round)

== Draw ==
=== Key ===
- Q = Qualifier
- WC = Wild card
- LL = Lucky loser
- Alt = Alternate
- SE = Special exempt
- PR = Protected ranking
- ITF = ITF entry
- JE = Junior exempt
- w/o = Walkover
- r = Retired
- d = Defaulted
- SR = Special ranking

=== Finals ===
Quarterfinals
14	(France) Marion Bartoli	3	7	6
7	(Russia) Vera Zvonareva	6	5	2
4	(Russia) Elena Dementieva	5	3
12	(Poland) Agnieszka Radwańska	7	6
6	(Russia) Svetlana Kuznetsova	6	6
(Russia) Anastasia Pavlyuchenkova	3	3
(China) Peng Shuai	7^{7}	3	2
13	(Russia) Nadia Petrova	6^{5}	6	6

Semifinals
14	(France) Marion Bartoli	4	3
12	(Poland) Agnieszka Radwańska	6	6
6	(Russia) Svetlana Kuznetsova	6	6
13	(Russia) Nadia Petrova	1	3

Final
12	(Poland) Agnieszka Radwańska	2	4
6	(Russia) Svetlana Kuznetsova	6	6

=== Top half ===
==== Section 1 ====
First round
1	(Russia) D Safina	6	6
(Italy) R Vinci	4	4
WC	(China) S Zhang	6	6
(Czech Republic) I Benešová	4	2
WC	(Belgium) Y Wickmayer	7	3	3
(Russia) A Kleybanova	5	6	6
(Slovakia) M Rybáriková	2	6	3
14	(France) M Bartoli	6	4	6
10	(Italy) F Pennetta	7^{7}	6
WC	(China) X Han	6^{2}	2
WC	(Russia) M Kirilenko	2	6	6^{2}
Q	(Ukraine) K Bondarenko	6	2	7
(Germany) S Lisicki	0	0	r
(Italy) F Schiavone	6	1
(Romania) S Cîrstea	2	2
7	(Russia) V Zvonareva	6	6

Second round
1	(Russia) D Safina	5	6^{5}
WC	(China) S Zhang	7	7^{7}
(Russia) A Kleybanova	2	3
14	(France) M Bartoli	6	6
10	(Italy) F Pennetta	3	7	6
Q	(Ukraine) K Bondarenko	6	5	3
(Italy) F Schiavone	3	0
7	(Russia) V Zvonareva	6	6

Third round
WC	(China) S Zhang	1	4
14	(France) M Bartoli	6	6
10	(Italy) F Pennetta	3	7	5
7	(Russia) V Zvonareva	6	5	7

Quarterfinals
14	(France) M Bartoli	3	7	6
7	(Russia) V Zvonareva	6	5	2

==== Section 2 ====
First round
4	(Russia) E Dementieva	6	6
(Germany) A-L Grönefeld	4	0
(Russia) E Vesnina	6^{2}	7	4
Q	(Hungary) M Czink	7^{7}	5	6
Q	(China) C Ji	2	4
(Czech Republic) L Šafářová	6	6
Q	(Poland) U Radwańska	4	5
(Switzerland) P Schnyder	6	7
LL	(United States) V King	6	6
LL	(Kazakhstan) G Voskoboeva	4	3
(Spain) MJ Martínez Sánchez	6^{5}	7^{7}	6
5	(Denmark) C Wozniacki	7^{7}	6^{2}	0

Second round
4	(Russia) E Dementieva	6	6
Q	(Hungary) M Czink	4	3
(Czech Republic) L Šafářová	6	0	4
16	(China) N Li	4	6	6
12	(Poland) A Radwańska	6	6
(Switzerland) P Schnyder	4	1
LL	(United States) V King	4	4
(Spain) MJ Martínez Sánchez	6	6

Third round
4	(Russia) E Dementieva	6	6
16	(China) N Li	2	0
12	(Poland) A Radwańska	4	6	6
(Spain) MJ Martínez Sánchez	6	4	2

Quarterfinals
4	(Russia) E Dementieva	5	3
12	(Poland) A Radwańska	7	6

=== Bottom half ===
==== Section 3 ====
First round
6	(Russia) S Kuznetsova	7^{7}	7
(China) J Zheng	6^{3}	5
(Spain) A Medina Garrigues	3	7	7
WC	(China) J Lu	6	5	5
(Hungary) Á Szávay	3	0
(Ukraine) A Bondarenko	6	6
(Italy) S Errani	6	6
LL	(United States) A Glatch	1	1
15	(Australia) S Stosur	4	6	3
(France) A Cornet	6	4	6
(France) A Rezaï	6	1	6^{5}
(Canada) A Wozniak	4	6	7^{7}
(Austria) S Bammer	5	1
(Russia) A Pavlyuchenkova	7	6
(Russia) V Dushevina	2	6^{1}
3	(United States) V Williams	6	7^{7}

Second round
6	(Russia) S Kuznetsova	6	6
(Spain) A Medina Garrigues	2	1
(Ukraine) A Bondarenko	6	6
(Italy) S Errani	3	3
(France) A Cornet	6^{0}	4
(Canada) A Wozniak	7^{7}	6
(Russia) A Pavlyuchenkova	3	6	6
3	(United States) V Williams	6	1	4

Third round
6	(Russia) S Kuznetsova	6	4	6
(Ukraine) A Bondarenko	3	6	0
(Canada) A Wozniak	4	4
(Russia) A Pavlyuchenkova	6	6

Quarterfinals
6	(Russia) S Kuznetsova	6	6
(Russia) A Pavlyuchenkova	3	3

==== Section 4 ====
First round
Q	(Kazakhstan) Y Shvedova	2	3
(China) S Peng	6	6
Q	(Belarus) O Govortsova	1	3
9	(Belarus) V Azarenka	6	6
13	(Russia) N Petrova	6	5	6
Q	(Russia) A Kudryavtseva	1	7	2
(Slovakia) D Hantuchová	7	6
(Spain) C Suárez Navarro	5	2
Q	(Israel) S Pe'er	4	2
(Russia) E Makarova	6	6
(Estonia) K Kanepi	5	4
2	(United States) S Williams	7	6

Second round
8	(Serbia) J Janković	6	5	2
(China) S Peng	4	7	6
(Russia) M Sharapova	6	6^{5}	7
9	(Belarus) V Azarenka	3	7^{7}	5
13	(Russia) N Petrova	6	2	7
(Slovakia) D Hantuchová	1	6	5
(Russia) E Makarova	3	2
2	(United States) S Williams	6	6

Third round
(China) S Peng	6	6
(Russia) M Sharapova	2	4
13	(Russia) N Petrova	6	3	7^{7}
2	(United States) S Williams	4	6	6^{5}

Quarterfinals
(China) S Peng	7^{7}	3	2
13	(Russia) N Petrova	6^{5}	6	6
