= 2011 China Open – Women's singles =

Women's singles
- 2011 China Open

Final
- Champion: (Poland) Agnieszka Radwańska
- Runner-up: (Germany) Andrea Petkovic
- Score: 7–5, 0–6, 6–4

Details
- Seeds: 16

Events
Singles	men	women
Doubles	men	women
← 2010 ·	China Open	· 2012 →

Agnieszka Radwańska defeated Andrea Petkovic in the final, 7–5, 0–6, 6–4 to win the women's singles tennis title at the 2011 China Open. This was the second consecutive year that the champion in Beijing also won the title in Tokyo.

Caroline Wozniacki was the defending champion, but lost in the quarterfinals to Flavia Pennetta.

== Seeds ==
1. (Denmark) Caroline Wozniacki (quarterfinals)
2. (Belarus) Victoria Azarenka (third round, withdrew due to a right foot injury)
3. (Russia) Vera Zvonareva (third round)
4. (China) Li Na (first round)
5. (Czech Republic) Petra Kvitová (second round)
6. (Australia) Samantha Stosur (second round)
7. (Italy) Francesca Schiavone (second round)
8. (France) Marion Bartoli (third round)
9. (Germany) Andrea Petkovic (final)
10. (Serbia) Jelena Janković (first round)
11. (Poland) Agnieszka Radwańska (champion)
12. (China) Peng Shuai (first round)
13. (Russia) Anastasia Pavlyuchenkova (quarterfinals)
14. (Germany) Sabine Lisicki (second round, withdrew due to gastrointestinal illness)
15. (Italy) Roberta Vinci (second round)
16. (Russia) Svetlana Kuznetsova (second round)

The four Tokyo semifinalists received a bye into the second round. They are as follows:

- (Belarus) Victoria Azarenka
- (Czech Republic) Petra Kvitová
- (Poland) Agnieszka Radwańska
- (Russia) Vera Zvonareva

== Draw ==
=== Key ===
- Q = Qualifier
- WC = Wild card
- LL = Lucky loser
- Alt = Alternate
- SE = Special exempt
- PR = Protected ranking
- ITF = ITF entry
- JE = Junior exempt
- w/o = Walkover
- r = Retired
- d = Defaulted
- SR = Special ranking

=== Finals ===
Quarterfinals
1	(Denmark) Caroline Wozniacki	6	0	6^{2}
(Italy) Flavia Pennetta	3	6	7^{7}
(Serbia) Ana Ivanovic	3	2^{r}
11	(Poland) Agnieszka Radwańska	6	3
(Russia) Maria Kirilenko	6	3	4
Q	(Romania) Monica Niculescu	3	6	6
9	(Germany) Andrea Petkovic	6	7^{7}
13	(Russia) Anastasia Pavlyuchenkova	3	6^{2}

Semifinals
(Italy) Flavia Pennetta	2	4
11	(Poland) Agnieszka Radwańska	6	6
Q	(Romania) Monica Niculescu	2	0
9	(Germany) Andrea Petkovic	6	6

Final
11	(Poland) Agnieszka Radwańska	7	0	6
9	(Germany) Andrea Petkovic	5	6	4

=== Top half ===
==== Section 1 ====
First round
1	(Denmark) C Wozniacki	3	6	7
(Czech Republic) L Hradecká	6	0	5
(Spain) A Medina Garrigues	3	0
(Australia) J Gajdošová	6	6
(Estonia) K Kanepi	6	6
WC	(China) S Zheng	0	3
(Romania) I-C Begu	2	0^{r}
14	(Germany) S Lisicki	6	0
12	(China) S Peng	6^{6}	5
(Italy) F Pennetta	7^{8}	7
(Slovakia) D Hantuchová	6	6
Q	(Greece) E Daniilidou	4	2
WC	(China) S Zhang	0	2
(Slovakia) D Cibulková	6	6
(Serbia) B Jovanovski	1	3
7	(Italy) F Schiavone	6	6

Second round
1	(Denmark) C Wozniacki	6	6
(Australia) J Gajdošová	2	3
(Estonia) K Kanepi	w/o
14	(Germany) S Lisicki
(Italy) F Pennetta	6	6
(Slovakia) D Hantuchová	2	1
(Slovakia) D Cibulková	6	6
7	(Italy) F Schiavone	2	2

Third round
1	(Denmark) C Wozniacki	6	7^{7}
(Estonia) K Kanepi	3	6^{3}
(Italy) F Pennetta	6	4	6
(Slovakia) D Cibulková	1	6	4

Quarterfinals
1	(Denmark) C Wozniacki	6	0	6^{2}
(Italy) F Pennetta	3	6	7^{7}

==== Section 2 ====
First round
(Czech Republic) K Zakopalová	6	6^{3}	6
(Russia) N Petrova	3	7^{7}	1
(Japan) K Date-Krumm	1	1
(Serbia) A Ivanovic	6	6
(Romania) A Dulgheru	2	1^{r}
16	(Russia) S Kuznetsova	6	4
WC	(China) J Zheng	4	6	7
(Italy) A Brianti	6	1	5
(Sweden) S Arvidsson	6	5	7
PR	(Ukraine) A Bondarenko	2	7	5

Second round
3	(Russia) V Zvonareva	6	4	6
(Czech Republic) K Zakopalová	3	6	2
(Serbia) A Ivanovic	6	6
16	(Russia) S Kuznetsova	2	3
11	(Poland) A Radwańska	6	6
WC	(China) J Zheng	1	4
(Sweden) S Arvidsson	7^{8}	4	6
5	(Czech Republic) P Kvitová	6^{6}	6	3

Third round
3	(Russia) V Zvonareva	2	1
(Serbia) A Ivanovic	6	6
11	(Poland) A Radwańska	6	6
(Sweden) S Arvidsson	4	2

Quarterfinals
(Serbia) A Ivanovic	3	2^{r}
11	(Poland) A Radwańska	6	3

=== Bottom half ===
==== Section 3 ====
First round
6	(Australia) S Stosur	6	6
(Bulgaria) T Pironkova	4	0
(Germany) J Görges	6^{9}	3
(Russia) M Kirilenko	7^{11}	6
(Italy) S Errani	6	6^{5}	4
(Czech Republic) P Cetkovská	4	7^{7}	6
(Austria) T Paszek	7	6
10	(Serbia) J Janković	5	4
15	(Italy) R Vinci	6	6
(Canada) R Marino	4	3
WC	(Argentina) G Dulko	2	3
Q	(France) V Razzano	6	6
WC	(China) Y Hu	0	7	0
Q	(South Africa) C Scheepers	6	5	6
Q	(Romania) M Niculescu	6	6
4	(China) N Li	4	0

Second round
6	(Australia) S Stosur	5	6	5
(Russia) M Kirilenko	7	1	7
(Czech Republic) P Cetkovská	6	4	2
(Austria) T Paszek	1	6	6
15	(Italy) R Vinci	6^{7}	0
Q	(France) V Razzano	7^{9}	6
Q	(South Africa) C Scheepers	2	1
Q	(Romania) M Niculescu	6	6

Third round
(Russia) M Kirilenko	6	6
(Austria) T Paszek	1	2
Q	(France) V Razzano	6	1	2
Q	(Romania) M Niculescu	4	6	6

Quarterfinals
(Russia) M Kirilenko	6	3	4
Q	(Romania) M Niculescu	3	6	6

==== Section 4 ====
First round
8	(France) M Bartoli	3	6	7
(Czech Republic) I Benešová	6	4	5
(Japan) A Morita	2	6	3
Q	(United States) C McHale	6	0	6
Q	(Spain) C Suárez Navarro	7	6
(Russia) E Makarova	5	1
(Czech Republic) L Šafářová	6^{4}	4
9	(Germany) A Petkovic	7^{7}	6
13	(Russia) A Pavlyuchenkova	7	6
Q	(Czech Republic) B Záhlavová-Strýcová	5	4
(Israel) S Pe'er	1	5
(Spain) MJ Martínez Sánchez	6	7
Q	(United Kingdom) L Robson	4	3
(Slovenia) P Hercog	6	6

Second round
8	(France) M Bartoli	6	6
Q	(United States) C McHale	2	1
Q	(Spain) C Suárez Navarro	4	4
9	(Germany) A Petkovic	6	6
13	(Russia) A Pavlyuchenkova	6	6
(Spain) MJ Martínez Sánchez	2	3
(Slovenia) P Hercog	6^{8}	3
2	(Belarus) V Azarenka	7^{10}	6

Third round
8	(France) M Bartoli	6	4	5
9	(Germany) A Petkovic	4	6	7
13	(Russia) A Pavlyuchenkova	w/o
2	(Belarus) V Azarenka

Quarterfinals
9	(Germany) A Petkovic	6	7^{7}
13	(Russia) A Pavlyuchenkova	3	6^{2}
