= 2010 China Open – Men's doubles =

Men's doubles
- 2010 China Open

Final
- Champions: (United States) Bob Bryan (United States) Mike Bryan
- Runners-up: (Poland) Mariusz Fyrstenberg (Poland) Marcin Matkowski
- Score: 6–1, 7–6^{(7–5)}

Events
Singles	men	women
Doubles	men	women
← 2009 ·	China Open	· 2011 →

Bob Bryan and Mike Bryan successfully defended their 2009 title. They defeated Polish pair Mariusz Fyrstenberg and Marcin Matkowski 6–1, 7–6^{(7–5)} in the final match.

== Seeds ==
1. (United States) Bob Bryan / (United States) Mike Bryan (champions)
2. (Canada) Daniel Nestor / (Serbia) Nenad Zimonjić (semifinals)
3. (Poland) Łukasz Kubot / (Austria) Oliver Marach (first round)
4. (Poland) Mariusz Fyrstenberg / (Poland) Marcin Matkowski (final)

== Draw ==
=== Key ===
- Q = Qualifier
- WC = Wild card
- LL = Lucky loser
- Alt = Alternate
- SE = Special exempt
- PR = Protected ranking
- ITF = ITF entry
- JE = Junior exempt
- w/o = Walkover
- r = Retired
- d = Defaulted
- SR = Special ranking

=== Draw ===
First round
1	(United States) B Bryan (United States) M Bryan	6	6
(United States) J Isner (United States) S Querrey	4	4
(Israel) J Erlich (Israel) A Ram	6^{5}	6	[10]
(Czech Republic) L Dlouhý (Germany) P Kohlschreiber	7^{7}	4	[6]
3	(Poland) Ł Kubot (Austria) O Marach	6	1	[9]
WC	(China) M Gong (China) Z Li	4	6	[11]
(Croatia) I Ljubičić (Spain) T Robredo	1	5
WC	(Chinese Taipei) Y-h Lu (Germany) F Mayer	6	7
(Spain) N Almagro (Serbia) J Tipsarević	6^{2}	2
(United States) M Fish (The Bahamas) M Knowles	7^{7}	6
(Spain) D Ferrer (Spain) A Montañés	6^{7}	4
4	(Poland) M Fyrstenberg (Poland) M Matkowski	7^{9}	6
(Brazil) T Bellucci (Ukraine) A Dolgopolov
(Ukraine) S Stakhovsky (Russia) M Youzhny	w/o
(Kazakhstan) A Golubev (Uzbekistan) D Istomin	4	1
2	(Canada) D Nestor (Serbia) N Zimonjić	6	6

Quarterfinals
1	(United States) B Bryan (United States) M Bryan	7^{7}	6
(Israel) J Erlich (Israel) A Ram	6^{4}	2
WC	(China) M Gong (China) Z Li	6	1	[10]
WC	(Chinese Taipei) Y-h Lu (Germany) F Mayer	3	6	[12]
(United States) M Fish (The Bahamas) M Knowles
4	(Poland) M Fyrstenberg (Poland) M Matkowski	w/o
(Ukraine) S Stakhovsky (Russia) M Youzhny	2	2
2	(Canada) D Nestor (Serbia) N Zimonjić	6	6

Semifinals
1	(United States) B Bryan (United States) M Bryan	7^{10}	6
WC	(Chinese Taipei) Y-h Lu (Germany) F Mayer	6^{8}	4
4	(Poland) M Fyrstenberg (Poland) M Matkowski	7^{7}	6
2	(Canada) D Nestor (Serbia) N Zimonjić	6^{3}	4

Finals
1	(United States) B Bryan (United States) M Bryan	6	7^{7}
4	(Poland) M Fyrstenberg (Poland) M Matkowski	1	6^{5}
