= 2009 China Open – Men's doubles =

Men's doubles
- 2009 China Open

Final
- Champions: (United States) Bob Bryan (United States) Mike Bryan
- Runners-up: (The Bahamas) Mark Knowles (United States) Andy Roddick
- Score: 6–4, 6–2

Events
Singles	men	women
Doubles	men	women
← 2008 ·	China Open	· 2010 →

Stephen Huss and Ross Hutchins were the defending champions, but they chose to participate at the Rakuten Japan Open Tennis Championships instead.

Bob Bryan and Mike Bryan won in the final 6–4, 6–2 against Mark Knowles and Andy Roddick.

== Seeds ==
1. (Canada) Daniel Nestor / (Serbia) Nenad Zimonjić (first round)
2. (United States) Bob Bryan / (United States) Mike Bryan (champions)
3. (South Africa) Wesley Moodie / (Belgium) Dick Norman (first round)
4. (Poland) Mariusz Fyrstenberg / (Poland) Marcin Matkowski (first round)

== Draw ==
=== Key ===
- Q = Qualifier
- WC = Wild card
- LL = Lucky loser
- Alt = Alternate
- SE = Special exempt
- PR = Protected ranking
- ITF = ITF entry
- JE = Junior exempt
- w/o = Walkover
- r = Retired
- d = Defaulted
- SR = Special ranking

First round
1	(Canada) D Nestor (Serbia) N Zimonjić	7^{9}	3	[3]
(Argentina) J Acasuso (Chile) F González	6^{7}	6	[10]
(The Bahamas) M Knowles (United States) A Roddick	6	6
WC	(Chinese Taipei) H-H Lee (Chinese Taipei) T-H Yang	3	4
3	(South Africa) W Moodie (Belgium) D Norman	7^{7}	3	[8]
(Czech Republic) L Dlouhý (Germany) P Kohlschreiber	6^{1}	6	[10]
(France) M Llodra (France) P-H Mathieu	1	1
(Poland) Ł Kubot (Austria) O Marach	6	6
(France) J Benneteau (France) J Chardy	6	6
WC	(United States) E Butorac (Australia) A Fisher	2	4
(United States) J Blake (Israel) A Ram	6	3	[10]
4	(Poland) M Fyrstenberg (Poland) M Matkowski	1	6	[3]
(Romania) V Hănescu (Netherlands) R Wassen	6	5	[7]
(Russia) N Davydenko (Russia) I Kunitsyn	4	7	[10]
(Brazil) B Soares (Zimbabwe) K Ullyett	1	6^{11}
2	(United States) B Bryan (United States) M Bryan	6	7^{13}

Quarterfinals
(Argentina) J Acasuso (Chile) F González	6	5	[4]
(The Bahamas) M Knowles (United States) A Roddick	4	7	[10]
(Czech Republic) L Dlouhý (Germany) P Kohlschreiber	6	6
(Poland) Ł Kubot (Austria) O Marach	3	4
(France) J Benneteau (France) J Chardy	5	6	[10]
(United States) J Blake (Israel) A Ram	7	4	[4]
(Russia) N Davydenko (Russia) I Kunitsyn	6^{3}	5
2	(United States) B Bryan (United States) M Bryan	7^{7}	7

Semifinals
(The Bahamas) M Knowles (United States) A Roddick	4	6	[10]
(Czech Republic) L Dlouhý (Germany) P Kohlschreiber	6	2	[7]
(France) J Benneteau (France) J Chardy	2	1
2	(United States) B Bryan (United States) M Bryan	6	6

Final
(The Bahamas) M Knowles (United States) A Roddick	4	2
2	(United States) B Bryan (United States) M Bryan	6	6
