= 2010 China Open – Women's singles =

Women's singles
- 2010 China Open

Final
- Champion: (Denmark) Caroline Wozniacki
- Runner-up: (Russia) Vera Zvonareva
- Score: 6–3, 3–6, 6–3

Details
- Seeds: 16

Events
| Singles | men | women |
| Doubles | men | women |
| ← 2009 · | China Open | · 2011 → |

Caroline Wozniacki defeated Vera Zvonareva in the final, 6–3, 3–6, 6–3 to win the women's singles tennis title at the 2010 China Open. Wozniacki became the first player to win titles in both Beijing and Tokyo in the same year. By defeating Petra Kvitová in the third round, Wozniacki also became the world No. 1 singles player for the first time, displacing an injured Serena Williams.

Svetlana Kuznetsova was the defending champion, but lost to Roberta Vinci in the first round.

== Seeds ==
1. (Denmark) Caroline Wozniacki * (champion)
2. (Russia) Vera Zvonareva (final)
3. (Serbia) Jelena Janković (second round)
4. (Australia) Samantha Stosur (first round)
5. (Italy) Francesca Schiavone * (quarterfinals)
6. (Poland) Agnieszka Radwańska (first round)
7. (Russia) Elena Dementieva * (third round)
8. (Belarus) Victoria Azarenka * (second round, retired due to left thigh strain)
9. (China) Li Na (semifinals)
10. (Russia) Svetlana Kuznetsova (first round)
11. (France) Marion Bartoli (first round)
12. (Russia) Maria Sharapova (second round)
13. (Russia) Nadia Petrova (third round, withdrew due to right foot injury)
14. (France) Aravane Rezaï (first round)
15. (Israel) Shahar Pe'er (semifinals)
16. (Russia) Anastasia Pavlyuchenkova (first round)

* The four Tokyo semifinalists received a bye into the second round.

== Draw ==
=== Key ===
- Q = Qualifier
- WC = Wild card
- LL = Lucky loser
- Alt = Alternate
- SE = Special exempt
- PR = Protected ranking
- ITF = ITF entry
- JE = Junior exempt
- w/o = Walkover
- r = Retired
- d = Defaulted
- SR = Special ranking

=== Finals ===
Quarterfinals
1 | (Denmark) Caroline Wozniacki | 7^{7} | 6
(Serbia) Ana Ivanovic | 6^{1} | 4
15 | (Israel) Shahar Pe'er | 7^{7} | 6
(Switzerland) Timea Bacsinszky | 6^{4} | 4
9 | (China) Li Na | 7^{8} | 6
Q | (Latvia) Anastasija Sevastova | 6^{6} | 3
5 | (Italy) Francesca Schiavone | 0 | 2
2 | (Russia) Vera Zvonareva | 6 | 6

Semifinals
1 | (Denmark) Caroline Wozniacki | 7 | 6
15 | (Israel) Shahar Pe'er | 5 | 2
9 | (China) Li Na | 3 | 3
2 | (Russia) Vera Zvonareva | 6 | 6

Final
1 | (Denmark) Caroline Wozniacki | 6 | 3 | 6
2 | (Russia) Vera Zvonareva | 3 | 6 | 3

=== Top half ===
==== Section 1 ====
First round
(Italy) S Errani | 1 | 6 | 6
WC | (China) S Peng | 6 | 4 | 1
(Italy) F Pennetta | 6^{4} | 1
(Czech Republic) P Kvitová | 7 | 6
(Estonia) K Kanepi | 7 | 6
16 | (Russia) A Pavlyuchenkova | 5 | 1
11 | (France) M Bartoli | 2 | 3
(Serbia) A Ivanovic | 6 | 6
(Spain) MJ Martínez Sánchez | 3 | 2
(Belarus) O Govortsova | 6 | 6
(Japan) K Date-Krumm | 6 | 6
(Spain) A Medina Garrigues | 0 | 4

Second round
1 | (Denmark) C Wozniacki | 6 | 6
(Italy) S Errani | 4 | 2
(Czech Republic) P Kvitová | 7 | 6^{6} | 6
(Estonia) K Kanepi | 5 | 7 | 2
(Serbia) A Ivanovic | 6 | 7
(Belarus) O Govortsova | 0 | 5
(Japan) K Date-Krumm | 3 | 6 | 3
7 | (Russia) E Dementieva | 6 | 1 | 6

Third round
1 | (Denmark) C Wozniacki | 6 | 6
(Czech Republic) P Kvitová | 3 | 2
(Serbia) A Ivanovic | 7 | 7
7 | (Russia) E Dementieva | 6^{2} | 6^{4}

Quarterfinals
1 | (Denmark) C Wozniacki | 7 | 6
(Serbia) A Ivanovic | 6^{1} | 4

==== Section 2 ====
First round
3 | (Serbia) J Janković | 7 | 7
(Czech Republic) K Zakopalová | 5 | 5
Q | (Serbia) B Jovanovski | 5 | 6 | 6
Q | (Ukraine) K Bondarenko | 7 | 4 | 3
(Switzerland) P Schnyder | 6 | 6
(Kazakhstan) Y Shvedova | 1 | 4
WC | (China) S Sun | 1 | 2
15 | (Israel) S Pe'er | 6 | 6
12 | (Russia) M Sharapova | 6 | 7
(Bulgaria) T Pironkova | 4 | 6^{5}
(Hungary) Á Szávay | 6^{4} | 6 | 3
(Russia) E Vesnina | 7 | 1 | 6
(Switzerland) T Bacsinszky | 3 | 6 | 7
(Germany) J Görges | 6 | 4 | 6^{4}

Second round
3 | (Serbia) J Janković | 6 | 2 | 2
Q | (Serbia) B Jovanovski | 4 | 6 | 6
(Switzerland) P Schnyder | 4 | 2
15 | (Israel) S Pe'er | 6 | 6
12 | (Russia) M Sharapova | 6^{3} | 2
(Russia) E Vesnina | 7 | 6
(Switzerland) T Bacsinszky | 4 | 3
8 | (Belarus) V Azarenka | 6 | 2 | r

Third round
Q | (Serbia) B Jovanovski | 1 | 2
15 | (Israel) S Pe'er | 6 | 6
(Russia) E Vesnina | 2 | 3
(Switzerland) T Bacsinszky | 6 | 6

Quarterfinals
15 | (Israel) S Pe'er | 7 | 6
(Switzerland) T Bacsinszky | 6^{4} | 4

=== Bottom half ===
==== Section 3 ====
First round
6 | (Poland) A Radwańska | 7 | 6^{3} | 5
(Germany) A Kerber | 5 | 7 | 7
(Romania) A Dulgheru | 6 | 6
(Czech Republic) B Záhlavová-Strýcová | 4 | 4
(Russia) A Kleybanova | 6 | 6
Q | (China) J Lu | 1 | 0
Q | (Russia) A Kudryavtseva | 2 | 0
9 | (China) N Li | 6 | 6
13 | (Russia) N Petrova | 6 | 6
WC | (China) X Han | 2 | 2
(Ukraine) A Bondarenko | 6 | 6
WC | (China) Y Zhou | 2 | 0
(Belgium) Y Wickmayer | 0 | 6^{6}
(Slovakia) D Cibulková | 6 | 7
Q | (Latvia) A Sevastova | 2 | 7 | 7
4 | (Australia) S Stosur | 6 | 6^{5} | 5

Second round
(Germany) A Kerber | 6 | 6
(Romania) A Dulgheru | 2 | 1
(Russia) A Kleybanova | 1 | 4
9 | (China) N Li | 6 | 6
13 | (Russia) N Petrova | 6 | 7
(Ukraine) A Bondarenko | 3 | 5
(Slovakia) D Cibulková | 6 | 1 | 2
Q | (Latvia) A Sevastova | 2 | 6 | 6

Third round
(Germany) A Kerber | 2 | 0
9 | (China) N Li | 6 | 6
13 | (Russia) N Petrova
Q | (Latvia) A Sevastova | w/o

Quarterfinals
9 | (China) N Li | 7 | 6
Q | (Latvia) A Sevastova | 6^{6} | 3

==== Section 4 ====
First round
(Slovakia) D Hantuchová | 3 | 6 | 3
(Slovenia) P Hercog | 6 | 0 | 6
Q | (Russia) V Dushevina | 6 | 6
Q | (Russia) E Makarova | 4 | 4
Q | (Italy) R Vinci | 6 | 2 | 6
10 | (Russia) S Kuznetsova | 3 | 6 | 3
14 | (France) A Rezaï | 4 | 6 | 4
(Argentina) G Dulko | 6 | 2 | 6
WC | (China) S Zhang | 1 | 0
(Russia) M Kirilenko | 6 | 6
(Czech Republic) L Šafářová | 2 | 3
(Germany) A Petkovic | 6 | 6
(Russia) D Safina | 4 | 6^{6}
2 | (Russia) V Zvonareva | 6 | 7

Second round
5 | (Italy) F Schiavone | 6 | 6
(Slovenia) P Hercog | 3 | 3
Q | (Russia) V Dushevina | 3 | 6 | 6
Q | (Italy) R Vinci | 6 | 2 | 3
(Argentina) G Dulko | 2 | 6 | 2
(Russia) M Kirilenko | 6 | 3 | 6
(Germany) A Petkovic | 4 | 1
2 | (Russia) V Zvonareva | 6 | 6

Third round
5 | (Italy) F Schiavone | 4 | 6 | 6
Q | (Russia) V Dushevina | 6 | 3 | 1
(Russia) M Kirilenko | 7 | 4 | 2
2 | (Russia) V Zvonareva | 5 | 6 | 6

Quarterfinals
5 | (Italy) F Schiavone | 0 | 2
2 | (Russia) V Zvonareva | 6 | 6
