= 2011 China Open – Men's doubles =

Men's doubles
- 2011 China Open

Final
- Champions: (France) Michaël Llodra (Serbia) Nenad Zimonjić
- Runners-up: (Sweden) Robert Lindstedt (Romania) Horia Tecău
- Score: 7–6^{(7–2)}, 7–6^{(7–4)}

Events
| Singles | men | women |
| Doubles | men | women |
| ← 2010 · | China Open | · 2012 → |

Bob Bryan and Mike Bryan were the defending champions, but Michaël Llodra and Nenad Zimonjić eliminated them in the semifinals.

Llodra and Zimonjić won the tournament beating Robert Lindstedt and Horia Tecău in the final, 7–6^{(7–2)}, 7–6^{(7–4)}.

== Seeds ==
1. (United States) Bob Bryan / (United States) Mike Bryan (semifinals)
2. (Belarus) Max Mirnyi / (Canada) Daniel Nestor (quarterfinals)
3. (France) Michaël Llodra / (Serbia) Nenad Zimonjić (champions)
4. (India) Mahesh Bhupathi / (India) Leander Paes (quarterfinals)

== Draw ==
=== Key ===
- Q = Qualifier
- WC = Wild card
- LL = Lucky loser
- Alt = Alternate
- SE = Special exempt
- PR = Protected ranking
- ITF = ITF entry
- JE = Junior exempt
- w/o = Walkover
- r = Retired
- d = Defaulted
- SR = Special ranking

=== Draw ===
First round
1 | (United States) B Bryan (United States) M Bryan | 6 | 6
(Czech Republic) L Dlouhý (Ukraine) A Dolgopolov | 2 | 2
(Czech Republic) T Berdych (Germany) F Mayer | 7 | 6
(Poland) M Fyrstenberg (Poland) M Matkowski | 5 | 3
3 | (France) M Llodra (Serbia) N Zimonjić | 6 | 6
(South Africa) R de Voest (Australia) A Fisher | 3 | 3
(Spain) M Granollers (Austria) O Marach | 6 | 2 | [10]
(United States) S Lipsky (United States) R Ram | 4 | 6 | [4]
(Croatia) M Čilić (Croatia) I Ljubičić | 6 | 6
(The Bahamas) M Knowles (Austria) J Melzer | 3 | 4
WC | (China) M Gong (China) Z Li | 2 | 6 | [3]
4 | (India) M Bhupathi (India) L Paes | 6 | 3 | [10]
Alt | (Spain) N Almagro (Spain) T Robredo | 3 | 5
(Sweden) R Lindstedt (Romania) H Tecău | 6 | 7
(Spain) F López (Spain) F Verdasco | 6 | 6^{5} | [5]
2 | (Belarus) M Mirnyi (Canada) D Nestor | 2 | 7^{7} | [10]

Quarterfinals
1 | (United States) B Bryan (United States) M Bryan | 6 | 6
(Czech Republic) T Berdych (Germany) F Mayer | 0 | 3
3 | (France) M Llodra (Serbia) N Zimonjić | 6 | 6
(Spain) M Granollers (Austria) O Marach | 1 | 4
(Croatia) M Čilić (Croatia) I Ljubičić | 6 | 6
4 | (India) M Bhupathi (India) L Paes | 2 | 3
(Sweden) R Lindstedt (Romania) H Tecău | 7^{8} | 2 | [10]
2 | (Belarus) M Mirnyi (Canada) D Nestor | 6^{6} | 6 | [6]

Semifinals
1 | (United States) B Bryan (United States) M Bryan | 6 | 6^{4} | [3]
3 | (France) M Llodra (Serbia) N Zimonjić | 3 | 7^{7} | [10]
(Croatia) M Čilić (Croatia) I Ljubičić | 4 | 7^{11} | [6]
(Sweden) R Lindstedt (Romania) H Tecău | 6 | 6^{9} | [10]

Final
3 | (France) M Llodra (Serbia) N Zimonjić | 7^{7} | 7^{7}
(Sweden) R Lindstedt (Romania) H Tecău | 6^{2} | 6^{4}
