= 2009 China Open – Women's doubles =

Women's doubles
- 2009 China Open

Final
- Champions: (Chinese Taipei) Hsieh Su-Wei (China) Peng Shuai
- Runners-up: (Russia) Alla Kudryavtseva (Russia) Ekaterina Makarova
- Score: 6–3, 6–1

Events
Singles	men	women
Doubles	men	women
← 2008 ·	China Open	· 2010 →

Anabel Medina Garrigues and Caroline Wozniacki were the defending champion, but Wozniacki chose not to participate this year. Medina Garrigues partnered with Virginia Ruano Pascual, but they lost in the second round against Anastasia Pavlyuchenkova and Yanina Wickmayer.
Hsieh Su-Wei and Peng Shuai won in the final 6–3, 6–1 against Alla Kudryavtseva and Ekaterina Makarova.

== Seeds ==
The top four seeds receive a bye into the second round.

1. (Zimbabwe) Cara Black / (United States) Liezel Huber (quarterfinals)
2. (Australia) Samantha Stosur / (Australia) Rennae Stubbs (second round)
3. (Spain) Anabel Medina Garrigues / (Spain) Virginia Ruano Pascual (second round)
4. (Spain) Nuria Llagostera Vives / (Spain) María José Martínez Sánchez (quarterfinals)
5. (Chinese Taipei) Hsieh Su-Wei / (China) Peng Shuai (champions)
6. (Germany) Anna-Lena Grönefeld / (Switzerland) Patty Schnyder (quarterfinals)
7. (United States) Vania King / (Russia) Nadia Petrova (first round)
8. (Chinese Taipei) Chuang Chia-Jung / (United States) Lisa Raymond (first round)

== Draw ==
=== Key ===
- Q = Qualifier
- WC = Wild card
- LL = Lucky loser
- Alt = Alternate
- SE = Special exempt
- PR = Protected ranking
- ITF = ITF entry
- JE = Junior exempt
- w/o = Walkover
- r = Retired
- d = Defaulted
- SR = Special ranking

=== Finals ===
Semifinals
(Russia) Alisa Kleybanova (Italy) Francesca Schiavone	2	3
5	(Chinese Taipei) Hsieh Su-wei (China) Peng Shuai	6	6
(Russia) Alla Kudryavtseva (Russia) Ekaterina Makarova	6	4	[10]
(China) Yan Zi (China) Zheng Jie	3	6	[8]

Final
5	(Chinese Taipei) Hsieh Su-wei (China) Peng Shuai	6	6
(Russia) Alla Kudryavtseva (Russia) Ekaterina Makarova	3	1

=== Top half ===
First round
(Romania) S Cîrstea (India) S Mirza	3	3
ALT	(Hungary) Á Szávay (Italy) R Vinci	6	6
(Belarus) V Azarenka (Russia) V Zvonareva	3	6	[7]
(Russia) A Kleybanova (Italy) F Schiavone	6	4	[10]
(Ukraine) A Bondarenko (Ukraine) K Bondarenko	6	5	[10]
7	(United States) V King (Russia) N Petrova	3	7	[8]
(Russia) A Pavlyuchenkova (Belgium) Y Wickmayer	7	6^{3}	[10]
(Russia) V Dushevina (Russia) A Rodionova	5	7	[2]
(Poland) K Jans (Poland) A Rosolska	1	1
(Italy) S Errani (Italy) F Pennetta	6	6
(Turkey) İ Şenoğlu (Kazakhstan) Y Shvedova	2	2
5	(Chinese Taipei) S-W Hsieh (China) S Peng	6	6

Second round
1	(Zimbabwe) C Black (United States) L Huber	3	6	[10]
ALT	(Hungary) Á Szávay (Italy) R Vinci	6	0	[3]
(Russia) A Kleybanova (Italy) F Schiavone	7	6
(Ukraine) A Bondarenko (Ukraine) K Bondarenko	6^{4}	2
3	(Spain) A Medina Garrigues (Spain) V Ruano Pascual	6	5	[6]
(Russia) A Pavlyuchenkova (Belgium) Y Wickmayer	2	7	[10]
(Italy) S Errani (Italy) F Pennetta	2	5
5	(Chinese Taipei) S-W Hsieh (China) S Peng	6	7

Quarterfinals
1	(Zimbabwe) C Black (United States) L Huber	6	6^{5}	[9]
(Russia) A Kleybanova (Italy) F Schiavone	3	7	[11]
(Russia) A Pavlyuchenkova (Belgium) Y Wickmayer	3	1
5	(Chinese Taipei) S-W Hsieh (China) S Peng	6	6

Semifinals
(Russia) A Kleybanova (Italy) F Schiavone	2	3
5	(Chinese Taipei) S-W Hsieh (China) S Peng	6	6

=== Bottom half ===
First round
8	(Chinese Taipei) C-J Chuang (United States) L Raymond	7	3	[6]
WC	(China) X Han (China) C Ji	6^{5}	6	[10]
WC	(China) T Sun (China) S Sun	2	6^{4}
(Russia) A Kudryavtseva (Russia) E Makarova	6	7
(South Africa) N Grandin (United States) R Kops-Jones	2	6	[10]
(Czech Republic) I Benešová (Kazakhstan) G Voskoboeva	6	4	[2]
6	(Germany) A-L Grönefeld (Switzerland) P Schnyder	4	7	[10]
(Belarus) O Govortsova (Belarus) T Poutchek	6	6^{3}	[4]
WC	(Russia) S Kuznetsova (Russia) D Safina	6	6
(United States) J Craybas (United States) A Glatch	0	0
(Hungary) M Czink (Poland) U Radwańska	6^{0}	2
(China) Z Yan (China) J Zheng	7	6

Second round
WC	(China) X Han (China) C Ji	6^{5}	2
(Russia) A Kudryavtseva (Russia) E Makarova	7	6
(South Africa) N Grandin (United States) R Kops-Jones	6	5	[6]
4	(Spain) N Llagostera Vives (Spain) MJ Martínez Sánchez	1	7	[10]
6	(Germany) A-L Grönefeld (Switzerland) P Schnyder	w/o
WC	(Russia) S Kuznetsova (Russia) D Safina
(China) Z Yan (China) J Zheng	7	1	[11]
2	(Australia) S Stosur (Australia) R Stubbs	6^{5}	6	[9]

Quarterfinals
(Russia) A Kudryavtseva (Russia) E Makarova	2	7	[10]
4	(Spain) N Llagostera Vives (Spain) MJ Martínez Sánchez	6	6^{8}	[7]
6	(Germany) A-L Grönefeld (Switzerland) P Schnyder	6	0	[5]
(China) Z Yan (China) J Zheng	4	6	[10]

Semifinals
(Russia) A Kudryavtseva (Russia) E Makarova	6	4	[10]
(China) Z Yan (China) J Zheng	3	6	[8]
