= 2010 China Open – Women's doubles =

Women's doubles
- 2010 China Open

Final
- Champions: (Chinese Taipei) Chuang Chia-jung (Belarus) Olga Govortsova
- Runners-up: (Argentina) Gisela Dulko (Italy) Flavia Pennetta
- Score: 7–6(2), 1–6, [10–7]

Events
Singles	men	women
Doubles	men	women
← 2009 ·	China Open	· 2011 →

Hsieh Su-wei and Peng Shuai were the defending champions, but they competed with different partners.
Hsieh played with Natalie Grandin, while Peng partnered with Kimiko Date-Krumm, but they all lost in the second round (Grandin/Hsieh lost to Vera Dushevina and Arantxa Parra Santonja, Date-Krumm/Peng lost to Vania King and Yaroslava Shvedova).
In the end, it was Chuang Chia-jung and Olga Govortsova who won in the final against Gisela Dulko and Flavia Pennetta, 7–6(2), 1–6, [10–7].

== Seeds ==
The top four seeds receive a bye into the second round.

1. (Argentina) Gisela Dulko / (Italy) Flavia Pennetta (final)
2. (Czech Republic) Květa Peschke / (Slovenia) Katarina Srebotnik (quarterfinals)
3. (Chinese Taipei) Chan Yung-jan / (United States) Liezel Huber (second round)
4. (United States) Vania King / (Kazakhstan) Yaroslava Shvedova (semifinals)
5. (Spain) Nuria Llagostera Vives / (Spain) María José Martínez Sánchez (quarterfinals)
6. (Russia) Maria Kirilenko / (Russia) Nadia Petrova (quarterfinals, Petrova withdrew due to right foot injury)
7. (United States) Lisa Raymond / (Australia) Rennae Stubbs (first round)
8. (Spain) Anabel Medina Garrigues / (China) Yan Zi (first round)

== Draw ==
=== Key ===
- Q = Qualifier
- WC = Wild card
- LL = Lucky loser
- Alt = Alternate
- SE = Special exempt
- PR = Protected ranking
- ITF = ITF entry
- JE = Junior exempt
- w/o = Walkover
- r = Retired
- d = Defaulted
- SR = Special ranking

=== Finals ===
Semifinals
1	(Argentina) Gisela Dulko (Italy) Flavia Pennetta	6	6
(Russia) Vera Dushevina (Spain) Arantxa Parra Santonja	3	3
4	(United States) Vania King (Kazakhstan) Yaroslava Shvedova	7	4	[3]
(Chinese Taipei) Chuang Chia-jung (Belarus) Olga Govortsova	6^{5}	6	[10]

Final
1	(Argentina) Gisela Dulko (Italy) Flavia Pennetta	6^{2}	6	[7]
(Chinese Taipei) Chuang Chia-jung (Belarus) Olga Govortsova	7	1	[10]

=== Top half ===
First round
(China) X Han (China) W Liu	6	4	[5]
(Italy) S Errani (Italy) R Vinci	2	6	[10]
(Belarus) E Dzehalevich (Belarus) T Poutchek	5	2
(Poland) K Jans (Poland) A Rosolska	7	6
(South Africa) C Scheepers (Switzerland) P Schnyder	3	4
5	(Spain) N Llagostera Vives (Spain) MJ Martínez Sánchez	6	6
(Hungary) Á Szávay (Czech Republic) B Záhlavová-Strýcová	6	7
(Germany) J Görges (Slovenia) P Hercog	1	6^{5}
(France) S Lefèvre (Czech Republic) K Zakopalová	1	1
(South Africa) N Grandin (Chinese Taipei) S-w Hsieh	6	6
(Russia) V Dushevina (Spain) A Parra Santonja	3	6	[12]
7	(United States) L Raymond (Australia) R Stubbs	6	3	[10]

Second round
1	(Argentina) G Dulko (Italy) F Pennetta	6	6
(Italy) S Errani (Italy) R Vinci	3	3
(Poland) K Jans (Poland) A Rosolska	2	4
5	(Spain) N Llagostera Vives (Spain) MJ Martínez Sánchez	6	6
3	(Chinese Taipei) Y-j Chan (United States) L Huber	4	5
(Hungary) Á Szávay (Czech Republic) B Záhlavová-Strýcová	6	7
(South Africa) N Grandin (Chinese Taipei) S-w Hsieh	4	6	[7]
(Russia) V Dushevina (Spain) A Parra Santonja	6	2	[10]

Quarterfinals
1	(Argentina) G Dulko (Italy) F Pennetta	6^{7}	6	[10]
5	(Spain) N Llagostera Vives (Spain) MJ Martínez Sánchez	7	1	[4]
(Hungary) Á Szávay (Czech Republic) B Záhlavová-Strýcová	6^{6}	6	[6]
(Russia) V Dushevina (Spain) A Parra Santonja	7	1	[10]

Semifinals
1	(Argentina) G Dulko (Italy) F Pennetta	6	6
(Russia) V Dushevina (Spain) A Parra Santonja	3	3

=== Bottom half ===
First round
6	(Russia) M Kirilenko (Russia) N Petrova	6	6
(Russia) M Kondratieva (Czech Republic) V Uhlířová	3	4
WC	(Belarus) V Azarenka (Russia) D Safina	6	7
WC	(China) S Sun (China) S Zhang	2	5
(Japan) K Date-Krumm (China) S Peng	7	6
(Uzbekistan) A Amanmuradova (Russia) A Kudryavtseva	6^{6}	3
8	(Spain) A Medina Garrigues (China) Z Yan	1	5
(Switzerland) T Bacsinszky (Italy) T Garbin	6	7
(Ukraine) A Bondarenko (Ukraine) K Bondarenko	0	1
(Chinese Taipei) C-j Chuang (Belarus) O Govortsova	6	6
(Romania) M Niculescu (Israel) S Pe'er	3	6	[11]
(Russia) A Kleybanova (Russia) E Makarova	6	1	[9]

Second round
6	(Russia) M Kirilenko (Russia) N Petrova	w/o
WC	(Belarus) V Azarenka (Russia) D Safina
(Japan) K Date-Krumm (China) S Peng	4	3
4	(United States) V King (Kazakhstan) Y Shvedova	6	6
(Switzerland) T Bacsinszky (Italy) T Garbin	6	3	[3]
(Chinese Taipei) C-j Chuang (Belarus) O Govortsova	4	6	[10]
(Romania) M Niculescu (Israel) S Pe'er	3	4
2	(Czech Republic) K Peschke (Slovenia) K Srebotnik	6	6

Quarterfinals
6	(Russia) M Kirilenko (Russia) N Petrova
4	(United States) V King (Kazakhstan) Y Shvedova	w/o
(Chinese Taipei) C-j Chuang (Belarus) O Govortsova	7	6
2	(Czech Republic) K Peschke (Slovenia) K Srebotnik	6^{5}	2

Semifinals
4	(United States) V King (Kazakhstan) Y Shvedova	7	4	[3]
(Chinese Taipei) C-j Chuang (Belarus) O Govortsova	6^{5}	6	[10]
