= 2011 China Open – Men's singles =

Men's singles
- 2011 China Open

Final
- Champion: (Czech Republic) Tomáš Berdych
- Runner-up: (Croatia) Marin Čilić
- Score: 3–6, 6–4, 6–1

Events
Singles	men	women
Doubles	men	women
← 2010 ·	China Open	· 2012 →

Novak Djokovic was the defending champion, but was unable to participate due to a back injury.

Tomáš Berdych won the title, defeating Marin Čilić in the final, 3–6, 6–4, 6–1.

== Seeds ==
1. (France) Jo-Wilfried Tsonga (semifinals)
2. (France) Gaël Monfils (withdrew due to a knee injury)
3. (Czech Republic) Tomáš Berdych (champion)
4. (Spain) Nicolás Almagro (first round)
5. (France) Gilles Simon (first round)
6. (United States) Andy Roddick (first round)
7. (United States) John Isner (withdrew due to abdominal strain)
8. (Ukraine) Alexandr Dolgopolov (first round)

== Draw ==
=== Key ===
- Q = Qualifier
- WC = Wild card
- LL = Lucky loser
- Alt = Alternate
- SE = Special exempt
- PR = Protected ranking
- ITF = ITF entry
- JE = Junior exempt
- w/o = Walkover
- r = Retired
- d = Defaulted
- SR = Special ranking

=== Finals ===
Semifinals
1	(France) Jo-Wilfried Tsonga	4	6	1
3	(Czech Republic) Tomáš Berdych	6	4	6
(Croatia) Ivan Ljubičić	4	3
(Croatia) Marin Čilić	6	6

Final
3	(Czech Republic) Tomáš Berdych	3	6	6
(Croatia) Marin Čilić	6	4	1

=== Top half ===
First round
1	(France) J-W Tsonga	7^{7}	7
(Bulgaria) G Dimitrov	6^{5}	5
WC	(China) Z Zhang	6	6
WC	(China) Z Li	1	3
(Brazil) T Bellucci	1	6^{4}
(Spain) JC Ferrero	6	7^{7}
(Spain) M Granollers	6	6
5	(France) G Simon	3	1
3	(Czech Republic) T Berdych	7	7
(Austria) J Melzer	5	5
Q	(Germany) P Kohlschreiber	6	7^{7}
(Spain) T Robredo	3	6^{0}
(Spain) F Verdasco	6	6
(France) M Llodra	2	4
Q	(Italy) F Cipolla	6	1	6
8	(Ukraine) A Dolgopolov	1	6	0

Second round
1	(France) J-W Tsonga	6	6
WC	(China) Z Zhang	3	4
(Spain) JC Ferrero	6	6
(Spain) M Granollers	4	4
3	(Czech Republic) T Berdych	6	6
Q	(Germany) P Kohlschreiber	2	0
(Spain) F Verdasco	2	6	6
Q	(Italy) F Cipolla	6	1	2

Quarterfinals
1	(France) J-W Tsonga	6	6
(Spain) JC Ferrero	3	4
3	(Czech Republic) T Berdych	6	6
(Spain) F Verdasco	1	0

Semifinals
1	(France) J-W Tsonga	4	6	1
3	(Czech Republic) T Berdych	6	4	6

=== Bottom half ===
First round
LL	(Russia) T Gabashvili	5	5
(Croatia) I Ljubičić	7	7
(Germany) F Mayer	6	6
Q	(Spain) A Ramos	2	4
Q	(Turkey) M İlhan	2	6^{6}
(Spain) F López	6	7^{8}
(Russia) M Youzhny	6	6
4	(Spain) N Almagro	3	2
6	(United States) A Roddick	4	5
(South Africa) K Anderson	6	7
(Spain) A Montañés	6	6
LL	(Chile) P Capdeville	3	3
WC	(China) D Wu	2	0
(Croatia) M Čilić	6	6
(Italy) F Fognini	6	6
LL	(Slovenia) G Žemlja	4	1

Second round
(Croatia) I Ljubičić	6	2	6
(Germany) F Mayer	0	6	3
(Spain) F López	7^{7}	2	5
(Russia) M Youzhny	6^{5}	6	7
(South Africa) K Anderson	7^{7}	7^{7}
(Spain) A Montañés	6^{3}	6^{4}
(Croatia) M Čilić	6	6^{1}	6
(Italy) F Fognini	2	7^{7}	3

Quarterfinals
(Croatia) I Ljubičić	7^{7}	6^{4}	6
(Russia) M Youzhny	6^{4}	7^{7}	2
(South Africa) K Anderson	6^{4}	6	1
(Croatia) M Čilić	7^{7}	4	6

Semifinals
(Croatia) I Ljubičić	4	3
(Croatia) M Čilić	6	6
