= 2009 China Open (tennis) =

- Date: October 2–11
- Edition: 11th (ATP) / 13th (WTA)
- Category: ATP World Tour 500 (men); WTA Premier Series (women)
- Surface: Hard - outdoor
- Location: Beijing, China

Champions

Men's singles
- (Serbia) Novak Djokovic

Women's singles
- (Russia) Svetlana Kuznetsova

Men's doubles
- (United States) Bob Bryan / (United States) Mike Bryan

Women's doubles
- (Chinese Taipei) Hsieh Su-wei / (China) Peng Shuai
← 2008 ·	China Open	· 2010 →

The 2009 China Open was a tennis tournament played on outdoor hard courts. It was the 11th edition of the China Open for the men (13th for the women), and was part of the ATP 500 Series of the 2009 ATP Tour, and of the Premier Series of the 2009 WTA Tour. Both the men's and the women's events were held at the Olympic Green Tennis Center in Beijing, China, from October 2 through October 11, 2009. Novak Djokovic and Svetlana Kuznetsova won the singles titles.

== Finals ==
=== Men's singles ===
(Serbia) Novak Djokovic defeated (Croatia) Marin Čilić, 6–2, 7–6^{(7–4)}

- It was Djokovic's 3rd title of the year and the 14th of his career.

=== Women's singles ===
(Russia) Svetlana Kuznetsova defeated (Poland) Agnieszka Radwańska, 6–2, 6–4

- It was Kuznetsova's 3rd title of the year and 12th of her career.

=== Men's doubles ===
(United States) Bob Bryan / (United States) Mike Bryan defeated (The Bahamas) Mark Knowles / (United States) Andy Roddick, 6–4, 6–2

=== Women's doubles ===
(Chinese Taipei) Hsieh Su-wei / (China) Peng Shuai defeated (Russia) Alla Kudryavtseva / (Russia) Ekaterina Makarova, 6–3, 6–1

== WTA entrants ==
=== Seeds ===
Country	Player	Rank^{1}	Seed
RUS	Dinara Safina	1	1
USA	Serena Williams	2	2
USA	Venus Williams	3	3
RUS	Elena Dementieva	4	4
DEN	Caroline Wozniacki	5	5
RUS	Svetlana Kuznetsova	6	6
RUS	Vera Zvonareva	7	7
SRB	Jelena Janković	8	8
BLR	Victoria Azarenka	9	9
ITA	Flavia Pennetta	10	10
SRB	Ana Ivanovic	11	11
POL	Agnieszka Radwańska	12	12
RUS	Nadia Petrova	13	13
FRA	Marion Bartoli	14	14
AUS	Samantha Stosur	15	15
CHN	Li Na	16	16
FRA	Virginie Razzano	18	17

- seeds are based on the rankings of September 28, 2009
- Razzano became the 17th seed as Ivanovic withdrew due to upper respiratory tract infection

=== Other entrants ===
The following players received wildcards into the singles main draw:

- (China) Han Xinyun
- (Russia) Maria Kirilenko
- (China) Lu Jingjing
- (Belgium) Yanina Wickmayer
- (China) Zhang Shuai

The following players received entry from the qualifying draw:

- (Ukraine) Kateryna Bondarenko
- (Hungary) Melinda Czink
- (Belarus) Olga Govortsova
- (China) Ji Chunmei
- (Russia) Alla Kudryavtseva
- (Israel) Shahar Pe'er
- (Poland) Urszula Radwańska
- (Kazakhstan) Yaroslava Shvedova

The following player received the lucky loser spot:

- (United States) Vania King (replacing Ana Ivanovic due to upper respiratory tract infection)
- (Kazakhstan) Galina Voskoboeva (replacing Gisela Dulko due to left adductor strain)
- (United States) Alexa Glatch (replacing Virginie Razzano due to Left calf strain)

== ATP entrants ==
=== Seeds ===
Country	Player	Rank^{1}	Seed
ESP	Rafael Nadal	2	1
SRB	Novak Djokovic	4	2
USA	Andy Roddick	6	3
RUS	Nikolay Davydenko	8	4
ESP	Fernando Verdasco	9	5
SWE	Robin Söderling	11	6
CHI	Fernando González	12	7
CRO	Marin Čilić	15	8

- seeds are based on the rankings of September 28, 2009

=== Other entrants ===
The following players received wildcards into the singles main draw:

- (Cyprus) Marcos Baghdatis
- (Croatia) Marin Čilić
- (Russia) Marat Safin

The following players received entry from the qualifying draw:

- (Italy) Fabio Fognini
- (United States) Robby Ginepri
- (Poland) Łukasz Kubot
- (Germany) Florian Mayer
