= 2009 China Open – Men's singles =

Men's singles
- 2009 China Open

Final
- Champion: (Serbia) Novak Djokovic
- Runner-up: (Croatia) Marin Čilić
- Score: 6–2, 7–6^{(7–4)}

Events
Singles	men	women
Doubles	men	women
← 2008 ·	China Open	· 2010 →

Andy Roddick was the defending champion, but he lost in the first round against Łukasz Kubot.
Novak Djokovic won in the final 6–2, 7–6^{(7–4)}, against Marin Čilić.

== Seeds ==
1. (Spain) Rafael Nadal (semifinals)
2. (Serbia) Novak Djokovic (champion)
3. (United States) Andy Roddick (first round)
4. (Russia) Nikolay Davydenko (quarterfinals)
5. (Spain) Fernando Verdasco (quarterfinals)
6. (Sweden) Robin Söderling (semifinals)
7. (Chile) Fernando González (second round)
8. (Croatia) Marin Čilić (final)

== Draw ==
=== Key ===
- Q = Qualifier
- WC = Wild card
- LL = Lucky loser
- Alt = Alternate
- SE = Special exempt
- PR = Protected ranking
- ITF = ITF entry
- JE = Junior exempt
- w/o = Walkover
- r = Retired
- d = Defaulted
- SR = Special ranking

=== Finals ===
Semifinals
1	(Spain) Rafael Nadal	1	3
8/WC	(Croatia) Marin Čilić	6	6
6	(Sweden) Robin Söderling	3	3
2	(Serbia) Novak Djokovic	6	6

Final
8/WC	(Croatia) Marin Čilić	2	6^{4}
2	(Serbia) Novak Djokovic	6	7^{7}

=== Top half ===
First round
1	(Spain) R Nadal	6	3	6
WC	(Cyprus) M Baghdatis	4	6	4
(United States) J Blake	6	3	6
Q	(Germany) F Mayer	3	6	3
(Argentina) J Acasuso	4	2
WC	(Russia) M Safin	6	6
(Spain) D Ferrer	5	4
7	(Chile) F González	7	6
4	(Russia) N Davydenko	6	6^{6}	6
(Russia) I Kunitsyn	1	7^{8}	2
(Germany) P Kohlschreiber	7^{8}	4	6
(Croatia) I Karlović	6^{6}	6	1
(France) J Benneteau	6	6
(Brazil) M Daniel	3	4
(Russia) I Andreev	4	4
8/WC	(Croatia) M Čilić	6	6

Second round
1	(Spain) R Nadal	7	6^{4}	6
(United States) J Blake	5	7^{7}	3
WC	(Russia) M Safin	6	6
7	(Chile) F González	3	4
4	(Russia) N Davydenko	6	6
(Germany) P Kohlschreiber	1	0
(France) J Benneteau	2	6	0
8/WC	(Croatia) M Čilić	6	2	6

Quarterfinals
1	(Spain) R Nadal	6	6
WC	(Russia) M Safin	3	1
4	(Russia) N Davydenko	4	4
8/WC	(Croatia) M Čilić	6	6

Semifinals
1	(Spain) R Nadal	1	3
8/WC	(Croatia) M Čilić	6	6

=== Bottom half ===
First round
6	(Sweden) R Söderling	6	4	6
(France) J Chardy	3	6	2
(Spain) T Robredo	6	6
(Germany) B Becker	2	1
(France) P-H Mathieu	6^{8}	6	1
(Croatia) I Ljubičić	7^{10}	4	6
Q	(Poland) Ł Kubot	6	6
3	(United States) A Roddick	2	4
5	(Spain) F Verdasco	6^{7}	6	6
Q	(United States) R Ginepri	7^{9}	1	2
(Spain) N Almagro	5	6^{3}
(Spain) JC Ferrero	7	7^{7}
Q	(Italy) F Fognini	6^{5}	5
(Serbia) V Troicki	7^{7}	7
(Romania) V Hănescu	3	5
2	(Serbia) N Djokovic	6	7

Second round
6	(Sweden) R Söderling	6	6
(Spain) T Robredo	3	3
(Croatia) I Ljubičić	7^{8}	4	6
Q	(Poland) Ł Kubot	6^{6}	6	4
5	(Spain) F Verdasco	7	6
(Spain) JC Ferrero	5	4
(Serbia) V Troicki	3	0
2	(Serbia) N Djokovic	6	6

Quarterfinals
6	(Sweden) R Söderling	7^{7}	6
(Croatia) I Ljubičić	6^{3}	4
5	(Spain) F Verdasco	3	6	1
2	(Serbia) N Djokovic	6	1	6

Semifinals
6	(Sweden) R Söderling	3	3
2	(Serbia) N Djokovic	6	6

== Qualifying ==
=== Seeds ===
1. (Spain) Feliciano López (first round)
2. (United States) Robby Ginepri (qualified)
3. (Italy) Fabio Fognini (qualified)
4. (Germany) Florian Mayer (qualified)
5. (France) Michaël Llodra (qualifying competition)
6. (United States) Brendan Evans (first round)
7. (France) Sébastien De Chaunac (qualifying competition, retired)
8. (Poland) Łukasz Kubot (qualified)

=== Qualifiers ===
1. (Poland) Łukasz Kubot
2. (United States) Robby Ginepri
3. (Italy) Fabio Fognini
4. (Germany) Florian Mayer

=== Draw ===
==== First qualifier ====
First round
1	(Spain) Feliciano López	6^{4}	6	3
(United States) Donald Young	7^{7}	3	6
(Slovakia) Kamil Čapkovič	3	1^{r}
8	(Poland) Łukasz Kubot	6	5

Qualifying competition
(United States) Donald Young	2	3
8	(Poland) Łukasz Kubot	6	6

==== Second qualifier ====
First round
2	(United States) Robby Ginepri	6	6
WC	(China) Zhang Ze	4	3
(Slovakia) Ivo Klec	2	1
5	(France) Michaël Llodra	6	6

Qualifying competition
2	(United States) Robby Ginepri	6	6
5	(France) Michaël Llodra	3	1

==== Third qualifier ====
First round
3	(Italy) Fabio Fognini	6	4	7
WC	(Chinese Taipei) Yang Tsung-hua	2	6	5
(Czech Republic) Lukáš Dlouhý	7^{8}	0	7^{7}
6	(United States) Brendan Evans	6^{6}	6	6^{1}

Qualifying competition
3	(Italy) Fabio Fognini	6	6
(Czech Republic) Lukáš Dlouhý	3	0

==== Fourth qualifier ====
First round
4	(Germany) Florian Mayer	7^{7}	6
(United States) Michael Yani	6^{1}	4
WC	(China) Zeng Shaoxuan	1	6^{3}
7	(France) Sébastien De Chaunac	6	7^{7}

Qualifying competition
4	(Germany) Florian Mayer	4
7	(France) Sébastien De Chaunac	1^{r}
