= María José Martínez Sánchez =

Spanish tennis player (born 1982)

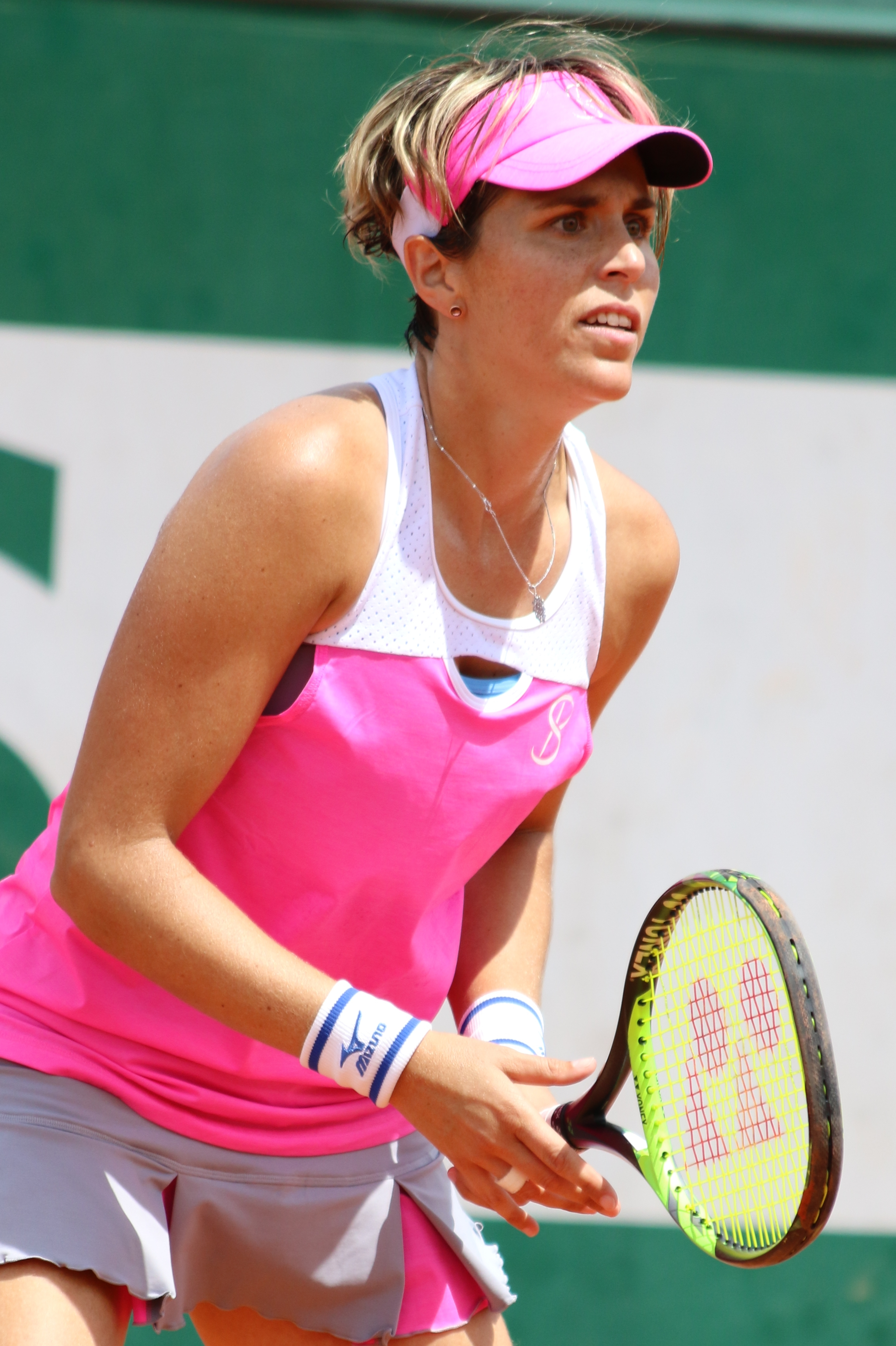
- Martínez Sánchez at the 2018 French Open
- Country (sports): Spain
- Residence: Barcelona, Spain
- Born: 12 August 1982 (age 43) Yecla, Spain
- Height: 1.76 m (5 ft 9 in)
- Turned pro: 1998
- Retired: 2020
- Plays: Left-handed (two-handed backhand)
- Prize money: US$ 4,409,022

Singles
- Career record: 361–246
- Career titles: 5 WTA, 12 ITF
- Highest ranking: No. 19 (10 May 2010)

Grand Slam singles results
- Australian Open: 3R (2009)
- French Open: 3R (2009, 2012)
- Wimbledon: 3R (2008, 2011)
- US Open: 3R (2009)

Doubles
- Career record: 491–259
- Career titles: 21 WTA, 22 ITF
- Highest ranking: No. 4 (5 July 2010)

Grand Slam doubles results
- Australian Open: QF (2009, 2019)
- French Open: SF (2010, 2012)
- Wimbledon: QF (2008, 2009, 2012)
- US Open: SF (2012)

Other doubles tournaments
- Tour Finals: W (2009)

Grand Slam mixed doubles results
- Australian Open: SF (2018, 2019)
- French Open: QF (2015, 2017, 2018)
- Wimbledon: SF (2017)
- US Open: 2R (2009)

Team competitions
- Fed Cup: 10–7
Medal record
Representing Spain
Mediterranean Games
Silver medal – second place	2001 Tunis	Doubles

María José Martínez Sánchez (Spanish pronunciation: [maˈɾi.a xoˈse maɾˈtineθ ˈsantʃeθ]; born 12 August 1982) is a Spanish former professional tennis player. In singles, she won five WTA Tour titles, her biggest being a Premier 5 title at the 2010 Italian Open where she defeated two former world No. 1 players, Ana Ivanovic and Jelena Janković, en route to the title. As a junior, she won the Orange Bowl (1999) and French Open (2000). She reached a career-high singles ranking of world No. 19, on 10 May 2010.

In doubles, Martínez Sánchez won 21 WTA Tour titles, ten partnering with her compatriot Nuria Llagostera Vives. Among them are the 2009 WTA Tour Championships, 2009 Rogers Cup and the Dubai Tennis Championships in 2010 and 2011. Martínez Sánchez reached a career-high doubles ranking of world No. 4, on 5 July 2010.

== Career ==
Martínez Sánchez won the 1999 Orange Bowl, a year-ending tennis event for Juniors. The following year, she became the champion of French Open girls' doubles. She made her first Grand Slam draw at the 2001 Australian Open, losing to the third seed Venus Williams in three sets.

=== 2008 ===
At Wimbledon, she advanced to the third round where she lost to eventual champion Venus Williams. In her next Grand Slam event, the US Open, she lost in the first round to Sabine Lisicki.

She finished off the year with a ranking of 87, only the second time of her career that she finished the year in the top 100 (her first being back in 2001).

=== 2009 ===
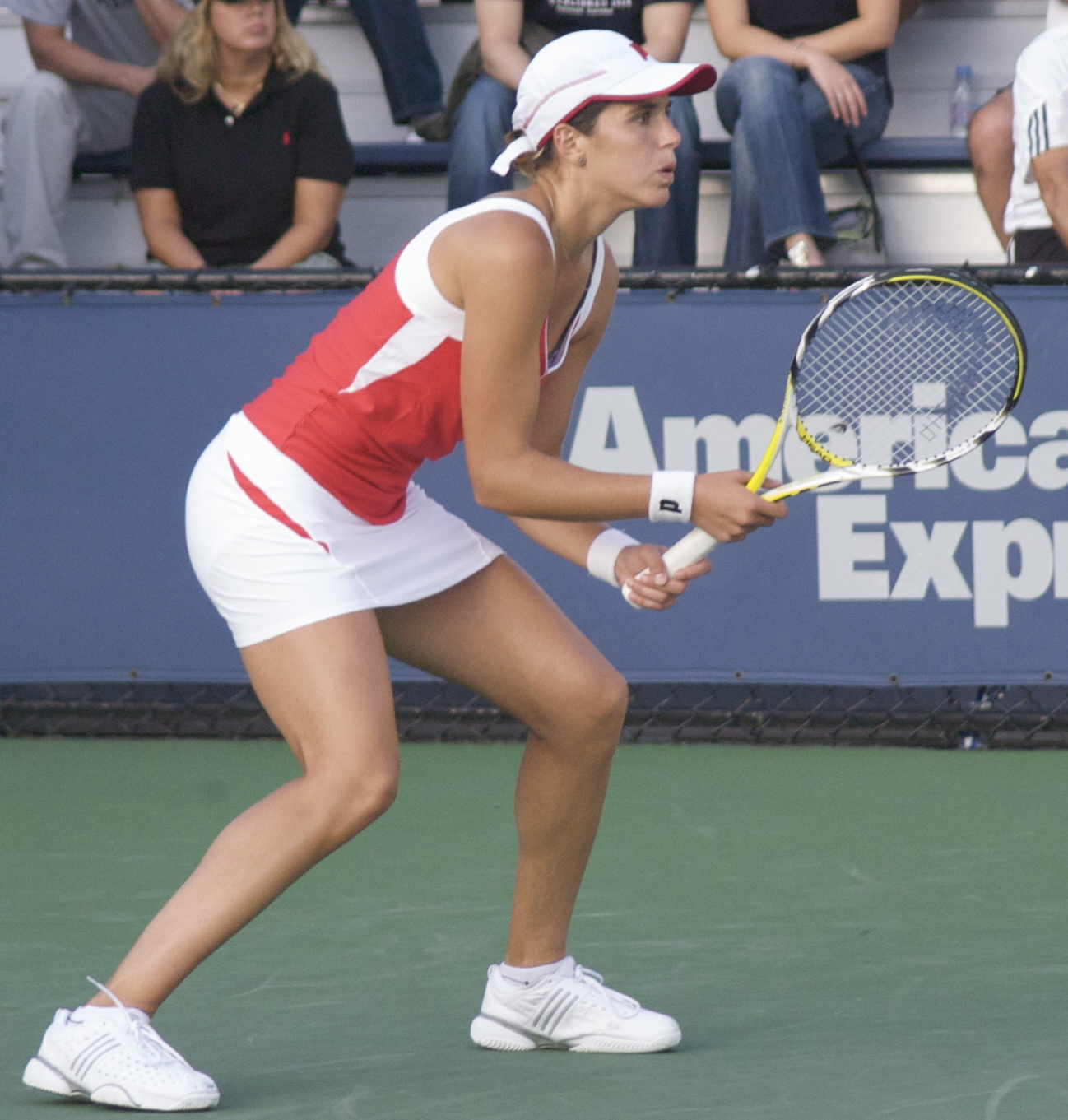
Sánchez playing at the 2009 US Open

Martínez Sánchez started the season playing at the Australian Open, the first major of the year. In the first round, she upset the 32nd seed Tamarine Tanasugarn, and then defeated Akgul Amanmuradova but lost in the third round to compatriot Carla Suárez Navarro both in straight sets. In doubles, she and Nuria Llagostera Vives were seeded 11th and defeated 6th seeds Yan Zi and Zheng Jie in the third round but they lost a tough match in the quarterfinals to Nathalie Dechy and Mara Santangelo 6–3, 6–7, 6–7.

María José next played at the Copa Colsanitas where she was seeded seventh. She defeated Anastasiya Yakimova, Arantxa Parra Santonja and Betina Jozami to reach the semifinals where she won a close two-setter against Patricia Mayr. She captured her first career singles title when she defeated third seed Gisela Dulko in the final. In doubles, Martínez Sánchez and Llagostera Vives were the top seeds and they reached the final where they beat second seeds Gisela Dulko and Flavia Pennetta to win their first doubles title of the year.

She reached the third round at Roland Garros. In that match against world No. 2, Serena Williams, she was accused of cheating and poor sportsmanship. At 2–2 in the first set, and having a break point at 30–40, Martínez Sánchez hit a drop shot and approached the net. Williams charged, and smashed a backhand, which deflected off of Martínez Sánchez, which appeared to be a winner, and Martínez Sánchez was awarded the point. Williams insisted that the ball had hit Martínez Sánchez's arm, not her racquet (which replays confirmed), but the umpire refused to change the decision. Williams, annoyed, threatened Martínez Sánchez, stating, "I'm gonna get you in the locker room girl, you don't know me." After the match Williams called her "a cheater". Martínez Sánchez went on to lose the match to Williams 6–4, 3–6, 4–6.

Martínez Sánchez won her second singles title at the year at the 2009 Swedish Open. On the way she defeated fourth seed Kaia Kanepi, Carla Suárez Navarro and Gisela Dulko, before beating top seed and world No. 9, Caroline Wozniacki in the final.

Martínez Sánchez and her partner Nuria Llagostera Vives won the year-end championships in doubles. As the third seeds, they defeated Venus and Serena Williams, before winning the biggest title of their careers against world-number-ones, Cara Black and Liezel Huber, in the final.

Maria qualified to play at the 2009 Commonwealth Bank Tournament of Champions in Bali. She recovered from a first set deficit to beat Szávay in three sets, 4–6, 6–4, 6–0. In her second group round-robin match she beat Stosur in straight sets (7–6, 7–5) where Stosur served a 208kmps world record serve. In the semifinals, she lost against Aravane Rezaï (2–6, 3–6), who clearly outplayed her on that day.

Overall, Martínez Sánchez had the greatest year of her career. The highlights were winning two singles WTA titles at Bogotá and Båstad (Sweden) and by reaching the third rounds at the Australian Open, Roland Garros, and US Open. She ended the year ranked world No. 30.

In doubles, she won seven titles with Llagostera Vives, at Bogotá, Acapulco, Barcelona, Palermo, Toronto, New Haven, and the most important, the WTA Tour Championships in Doha. She ended the year ranked world No. 5.

=== 2010 ===
Her first tournament of the year was winning the Hopman Cup with partner Tommy Robredo. They reached the Final after defeating top seeds Australia, the United States, and Romania without losing a single match. However, she had a shock loss to young British prospect Laura Robson but was able to secure a 2–1 win for Spain.

Martínez Sánchez was seeded 24th at the 2010 Australian Open but lost in the second round to world No. 35, Zheng Jie, 6–2, 2–6, 3–6.

At Indian Wells, she entered in the second round against Alexandra Dulgheru and struggled through in three sets, 2–6, 6–3, 6–1. Then she went on winning in straight sets over Belarusian Victoria Azarenka in the third round, 7–6, 6–2, and another straight sets win over Belgian Yanina Wickmayer in the fourth round 6–4, 6–4. In her quarterfinal match, she was defeated by Samantha Stosur in straight sets.

Martínez Sánchez major breakthrough tournament came at the Italian Open, a Premier 5 event in Rome where nine of the top ten women were competing. She upset world No. 17, Francesca Schiavone, world No. 2 Caroline Wozniacki and then Lucie Šafářová in straight sets. She then defeated Ana Ivanovic in the semifinals in straight sets and went on to beat world No. 7, Jelena Janković, in the final to win the biggest title of her career so far. Due to her impressive performance in Rome, she became a top 20 player for the first time, at No. 19. However, she was unable to carry any momentum at all into the French Open, suffering defeat in the first round, because her neck was injured while she was training the same day and she could hardly move the neck in the match.

She returned in Eastbourne, winning the first match against Vera Zvonareva and the second round again Aravane Rezaï. She was defeated in the quarterfinals by Marion Bartoli in a really hard match. But more bad luck came to María once again when her leg was injured due to bad movement before her quarterfinals doubles match. This time would be worse for she would miss Wimbledon and most of the summer season, before returning in New Haven and losing in the first round against wildcard Elena Dementieva.

In the US Open, she failed to repeat her third-round finish of the previous year, losing in the second round against Patty Schnyder in a tight match. Overall, the result was good for Martínez Sánchez who had made a lot unforced errors, and Schnyder who had her best match in the past few months.

=== 2011 ===
Martínez Sánchez started off the year at the Sydney International where she defeated Daniela Hantuchová in the first round 6–2, 6–4, before setting up a meeting with Alisa Kleybanova where she lost in straight sets. At the Australian Open, Martínez Sánchez was seeded 26. In the first round, she faced Gréta Arn who had recently won the Auckland Open. Martínez Sánchez won against Arn although was subsequently defeated by Frenchwoman Alizé Cornet in the second round.

At Wimbledon, Martínez Sánchez came from a set down to upset 15th seed Jelena Janković in the first round. She then made quick work of Romanian Monica Niculescu in the following match. She lost to 23rd seed and five-time Wimbledon champion, Venus Williams, in the third round.

She earned two International Championships in 2011. In July, Martínez Sánchez defeated Patricia Mayr-Achleitner at the Gastein Ladies in Austria. She followed that win with a 7–6, 7–6-victory over Galina Voskoboeva at the Korea Open in September.

=== 2012 ===
2012 was a year of injury and struggles for Martínez Sánchez as she consequently fell out of the top 150 in singles.

After withdrawing from the Australian Open with a left knee injury, she failed to win a main-draw match until the French Open, where she reached the third round losing to 15th seed Dominika Cibulková, 2–6, 1–6. Martínez Sánchez experienced even more success in doubles where she reached the semifinals with Llagostera Vives, losing to eventual champions and No. 4 seeds, Sara Errani and Roberta Vinci.

Martínez Sánchez lost to Laura Robson and Ana Ivanovic both in three sets, at the Eastbourne International and Wimbledon, respectively, the first sending her out of the top 50. However, in doubles, again with Llagostera Vives, they won in Eastbourne without dropping a set and defeating the top-2 seeds, but they lost in the quarterfinals of Wimbledon to Flavia Pennetta and Francesca Schiavone in a tough three-setter.

At the 2012 Summer Olympics, Martínez Sánchez defeated Polona Hercog 6–4, 6–2, before being routed out by Victoria Azarenka 6–1, 6–2. She and Llagostera Vives routed Casey Dellacqua and Sam Stosur (6–1, 6–1), before falling to Peng Shuai and Zheng Jie (4–6, 2–6).

The Spaniard then lost in the first round of both singles and doubles in tough matches at Montreal. She fell out of the top 100 of singles following the loss to Carla Suárez Navarro.

Despite falling first round again in singles in Cincinnati, Martínez Sánchez and Llagostera Vives were pushed in the first round by Olga Govortsova and Alla Kudryavtseva, but fell to eighth seeds Katarina Srebotnik and Zheng Jie, 4–6, 3–6.

A good run at the US Open caused her to bounce back into the top 100 of singles and the top 15 of doubles. After a tough first-round match with fellow veteran Mirjana Lučić winning 6–3, 7–5, she pushed eventual champ Serena Williams, 6–2, 6–4. The scoreline was easier than it looks however. After a series of tough wins with Llagostera Vives in doubles, they met the eventual champions Sara Errani and Roberta Vinci, falling 2–6, 3–6.

Entering the Korea Open as the defending champion, she played well defeating Eleni Daniilidou, and Nadia Petrova via walkover, but lost in the quarterfinals where she was routed by Ekaterina Makarova 1–6, 1–6. The loss sent her sprawling out of the top 100 to 137. Martínez Sánchez then lost in the first round of qualifyings at Tokyo, Beijing, and Osaka. In Osaka, she managed to push second seed Zheng Jie to a tough three-setter, losing 6–4, 5–7, 4–6 despite going up a set and 5–2.

=== 2015 ===
After giving birth in November 2013 to a daughter, Andrea, she returned on the main tour in the Miami Open doubles draw, pairing with Vera Dushevina.

=== 2019 ===
Alongside partner Neal Skupski, the Spaniard was beaten in her mixed-doubles semifinal in the 2019 Australian Open.

== Significant finals ==
=== Year-end championships ===
==== Doubles: 1 (title) ====
Result	Year	Tournament	Surface	Partner	Opponents	Score
Win	2009	WTA Championships	Hard	(Spain) Nuria Llagostera Vives	(Zimbabwe) Cara Black; (United States) Liezel Huber	7–6^{(7–0)}, 5–7, [10–7]

=== Tier I / Premier Mandatory & Premier 5 tournaments ===
==== Singles: 1 (title) ====
Result	Year	Tournament	Surface	Opponent	Score
Win	2010	Italian Open	Clay	(Serbia) Jelena Janković	7–6^{(7–5)}, 7–5

==== Doubles: 7 (3 titles, 4 runner-ups) ====
Result	Year	Tournament	Surface	Partner	Opponent	Score
Loss	2008	German Open	Clay	(Spain) Nuria Llagostera Vives	(Zimbabwe) Cara Black; (United States) Liezel Huber	6–3, 2–6, [2–10]
Loss	2009	Cincinnati Open	Hard	(Spain) Nuria Llagostera Vives	(Zimbabwe) Cara Black (United States) Liezel Huber	3–6, 6–0, [2–10]
Win	2009	Canadian Open	Hard	(Spain) Nuria Llagostera Vives	(Australia) Samantha Stosur; (Australia) Rennae Stubbs	2–6, 7–5, [11–9]
Win	2010	Dubai Championships	Hard	(Spain) Nuria Llagostera Vives	(Czech Republic) Květa Peschke; (Slovenia) Katarina Srebotnik	7–6^{(7–5)}, 6–4
Loss	2010	Italian Open	Clay	(Spain) Nuria Llagostera Vives	(Argentina) Gisela Dulko; (Italy) Flavia Pennetta	4–6, 2–6
Win	2011	Dubai Championships (2)	Hard	(United States) Liezel Huber	(Czech Republic) Květa Peschke (Slovenia) Katarina Srebotnik	7–6^{(7–5)}, 6–3
Loss	2018	Qatar Open	Hard	(Slovenia) Andreja Klepač	(Canada) Gabriela Dabrowski; (Latvia) Jeļena Ostapenko	3–6, 3–6

== WTA Tour finals ==
=== Singles: 6 (5 titles, 1 runner-up) ===
Winner — Legend Grand Slam tournaments Premier M & Premier 5 (1–0) Premier (0–0) International (4–1)

Result	No.	Date	Tournament	Surface	Opponent	Score
Loss	1.	Jun 2008	Barcelona Open, Spain	Clay	(Russia) Maria Kirilenko	0–6, 2–6
Win	1.	Feb 2009	Copa Colsanitas, Colombia	Clay	(Argentina) Gisela Dulko	6–3, 6–2
Win	2.	Jul 2009	Swedish Open, Sweden	Clay	(Denmark) Caroline Wozniacki	7–5, 6–4
Win	3.	May 2010	Italian Open, Italy	Clay	(Serbia) Jelena Janković	7–6^{(7–5)}, 7–5
Win	4.	Jul 2011	Austrian Open, Austria	Clay	(Austria) Patricia Mayr-Achleitner	6–0, 7–5
Win	5.	Sep 2011	Korea Open, South Korea	Hard	(Kazakhstan) Galina Voskoboeva	7–6^{(7–0)}, 7–6^{(7–2)}

=== Doubles: 35 (21 titles, 14 runner-ups) ===
Winner — Legend Grand Slam tournaments WTA Tour Championships (1–0) Premier M & Premier 5 (3–4) Premier (3–3) International (14–7)

Result	No.	Date	Tournament	Surface	Partner	Opponents	Score
Win	1.	Mar 2001	Acapulco, Mexico	Clay	(Spain) Anabel Medina Garrigues	(Spain) Virginia Ruano Pascual; (Argentina) Paola Suárez	6–4, 6–7^{(5–7)}, 7–5
Win	2.	Apr 2001	Porto, Portugal	Clay	(Spain) Anabel Medina Garrigues	(France) Alexandra Fusai; (Italy) Rita Grande	6–1, 6–7^{(5–7)}, 7–5
Win	3.	May 2001	Bol, Croatia	Clay	(Spain) Anabel Medina Garrigues	(Russia) Nadia Petrova; (Slovenia) Tina Pisnik	7–5, 6–4
Loss	1.	Jul 2001	Palermo, Italy	Clay	(Spain) Anabel Medina Garrigues	(Italy) Tathiana Garbin; (Slovakia) Janette Husárová	6–4, 2–6, 4–6
Loss	2.	Jul 2001	Casablanca, Morocco	Clay	(Argentina) María Emilia Salerni	(Bulgaria) Lubomira Bacheva; (Sweden) Åsa Carlsson	3–6, 7–6^{(7–4)}, 1–6
Win	4.	Aug 2001	Basel, Switzerland	Clay	(Spain) Anabel Medina Garrigues	(South Africa) Joannette Kruger; (Spain) Marta Marrero	7–6^{(7–5)}, 6–2
Loss	3.	Aug 2002	Espoo, Finland	Clay	(Spain) Eva Bes-Ostariz	(Russia) Svetlana Kuznetsova; (Spain) Arantxa Sánchez Vicario	3–6, 7–6^{(7–5)}, 3–6
Loss	4.	Jul 2003	Palermo, Italy	Clay	(Spain) Arantxa Parra Santonja	(Italy) Adriana Serra Zanetti; (Italy) Emily Stellato	4–6, 2–6
Win	5.	Mar 2008	Acapulco, Mexico (2)	Clay	(Spain) Nuria Llagostera Vives	(Czech Republic) Iveta Benešová; (Czech Republic) Petra Cetkovská	6–2, 6–4
Loss	5.	May 2008	Berlin, Germany	Clay	(Spain) Nuria Llagostera Vives	(Zimbabwe) Cara Black; (United States) Liezel Huber	6–3, 2–6, [2–10]
Loss	6.	Jun 2008	Barcelona, Spain	Clay	(Spain) Nuria Llagostera Vives	(Spain) Lourdes Domínguez Lino (Spain) Arantxa Parra Santonja	6–4, 5–7, [4–10]
Win	6.	Feb 2009	Bogotá, Colombia	Clay	(Spain) Nuria Llagostera Vives	(Argentina) Gisela Dulko; (Italy) Flavia Pennetta	7–5, 3–6, [10–7]
Win	7.	Feb 2009	Acapulco, Mexico (3)	Clay	(Spain) Nuria Llagostera Vives	(Spain) Lourdes Domínguez Lino (Spain) Arantxa Parra Santonja	6–4, 6–2
Win	8.	Apr 2009	Barcelona, Spain	Clay	(Spain) Nuria Llagostera Vives	(Romania) Sorana Cîrstea; (Slovenia) Andreja Klepač	3–6, 6–2, [10–8]
Loss	7.	Jul 2009	Båstad, Sweden	Clay	(Spain) Nuria Llagostera Vives	(Argentina) Gisela Dulko (Italy) Flavia Pennetta	2–6, 6–0, [5–10]
Win	9.	Jul 2009	Palermo, Italy	Clay	(Spain) Nuria Llagostera Vives	(Ukraine) Mariya Koryttseva; (Belarus) Darya Kustova	6–1, 6–2
Loss	8.	Aug 2009	Cincinnati, U.S.	Hard	(Spain) Nuria Llagostera Vives	(Zimbabwe) Cara Black (United States) Liezel Huber	3–6, 6–0, [2–10]
Win	10.	Aug 2009	Toronto, Canada	Hard	(Spain) Nuria Llagostera Vives	(Australia) Samantha Stosur; (Australia) Rennae Stubbs	2–6, 7–5, [11–9]
Win	11.	Aug 2009	New Haven, USA	Hard	(Spain) Nuria Llagostera Vives	(Czech Republic) Iveta Benešová (Czech Republic) Lucie Hradecká	6–2, 7–5
Win	12.	Nov 2009	WTA Finals, Doha, Qatar	Hard	(Spain) Nuria Llagostera Vives	(Zimbabwe) Cara Black (United States) Liezel Huber	7–6^{(7–0)}, 5–7, [10–7]
Win	13.	Feb 2010	Dubai, UAE	Hard	(Spain) Nuria Llagostera Vives	(Czech Republic) Květa Peschke; (Slovenia) Katarina Srebotnik	7–6^{(7–5)}, 6–4
Loss	9.	May 2010	Rome, Italy	Clay	(Spain) Nuria Llagostera Vives	(Argentina) Gisela Dulko (Italy) Flavia Pennetta	4–6, 2–6
Loss	10.	Oct 2010	Moscow, Russia	Hard (i)	(Italy) Sara Errani	(Argentina) Gisela Dulko (Italy) Flavia Pennetta	3–6, 6–2, [6–10]
Win	14.	Feb 2011	Dubai, UAE (2)	Hard	(United States) Liezel Huber	(Czech Republic) Květa Peschke (Slovenia) Katarina Srebotnik	7–6^{(7–5)}, 6–3
Win	15.	Jul 2011	Båstad, Sweden	Clay	(Spain) Lourdes Domínguez Lino	(Spain) Nuria Llagostera Vives (Spain) Arantxa Parra Santonja	6–3, 6–3
Win	16.	Jun 2012	Eastbourne, United Kingdom	Grass	(Spain) Nuria Llagostera Vives	(United States) Liezel Huber (United States) Lisa Raymond	6–4, ret.
Win	17.	Jun 2016	Mallorca, Spain	Grass	(Canada) Gabriela Dabrowski	(Germany) Anna-Lena Friedsam (Germany) Laura Siegemund	6–4, 6–2
Win	18.	Sep 2017	Tokyo, Japan	Hard	(Slovenia) Andreja Klepač	(Australia) Daria Gavrilova (Russia) Daria Kasatkina	6–3, 6–2
Loss	11.	Jan 2018	Brisbane, Australia	Hard	(Slovenia) Andreja Klepač	(Netherlands) Kiki Bertens (Netherlands) Demi Schuurs	5–7, 2–6
Loss	12.	Feb 2018	Doha, Qatar	Hard	(Slovenia) Andreja Klepač	(Canada) Gabriela Dabrowski (Latvia) Jeļena Ostapenko	3–6, 3–6
Loss	13.	Apr 2018	Charleston, U.S.	Clay	(Slovenia) Andreja Klepač	(Russia) Alla Kudryavtseva (Slovenia) Katarina Srebotnik	3–6, 3–6
Win	19.	Jun 2018	Mallorca, Spain (2)	Grass	(Slovenia) Andreja Klepač	(Czech Republic) Lucie Šafářová (Czech Republic) Barbora Štefková	6–1, 3–6, [10–3]
Win	20.	May 2019	Rabat, Morocco	Clay	(Spain) Sara Sorribes Tormo	(Spain) Georgina García Pérez (Georgia (country)) Oksana Kalashnikova	7–5, 6–1
Loss	14.	Jun 2019	Mallorca, Spain	Grass	(Spain) Sara Sorribes Tormo	(Belgium) Kirsten Flipkens (Sweden) Johanna Larsson	2–6, 4–6
Win	21.	Aug 2019	Bronx, U.S.	Hard	(Croatia) Darija Jurak	(Russia) Margarita Gasparyan (Romania) Monica Niculescu	7–5, 2–6, [10–7]

== ITF Circuit finals ==
$100,000 tournaments
$75,000 tournaments
$50,000 tournaments
$25,000 tournaments
$10,000 tournaments

=== Singles (12–8) ===
Result	No.	Date	Location	Surface	Opponent	Score
Loss	1.	24 May 1999	Ceuta, Spain	Clay	(Spain) Nuria Llagostera Vives	3–6, 4–6
Win	1.	25 July 1999	Valladolid, Spain	Hard	(South Korea) Choi Ju-yeon	7–6, 6–2
Win	2.	15 May 2000	Edinburgh, United Kingdom	Clay	(Hungary) Zsófia Gubacsi	6–2, 6–3
Loss	2.	4 June 2000	Modena, Italy	Clay	(Spain) Lourdes Domínguez Lino	6–4, 4–6, 5–7
Win	3.	10 July 2000	Getxo, Spain	Clay	(Ukraine) Julia Vakulenko	6–4, 6–0
Win	4.	23 July 2000	Valladolid, Spain	Hard	(Spain) Paula Hermida	6–4, 6–2
Loss	3.	4 September 2000	Denain, France	Hard (i)	(Spain) Anabel Medina Garrigues	6–2, 5–7, 0–6
Loss	4.	29 April 2001	Caserta, Italy	Clay	(Italy) Tathiana Garbin	6–3, 6–7, 2–6
Loss	5.	2 June 2003	Galatina, Italy	Clay	(Estonia) Kaia Kanepi	3–6, 3–6
Win	5.	2 August 2005	Vigo, Spain	Hard	(Germany) Annette Kolb	6–7^{(5)}, 7–5, 7–6^{(4)}
Loss	6.	30 August 2005	Mollerussa, Spain	Hard	(France) Kildine Chevalier	2–6, 7–5, 2–6
Loss	7.	20 March 2006	Sabadell, Spain	Clay	(Spain) Estrella Cabeza Candela	3–6, 5–7
Win	6.	16 April 2006	San Luis Potosí, Mexico	Clay	(Argentina) María José Argeri	6–2, 4–6, 6–2
Win	7.	1 May 2006	Catania, Italy	Clay	(Italy) Karin Knapp	3–6, 6–4, 4–6
Win	8.	6 June 2006	Madrid, Spain	Hard	(Republic of Ireland) Kelly Liggan	7–6, 6–3
Win	9.	23 October 2006	Sant Cugat, Spain	Clay	(Spain) Arantxa Parra Santonja	6–2, 6–4
Win	10.	17 April 2007	Calvià, Spain	Clay	(Australia) Casey Dellacqua	6–1, 6–7, 7–5
Win	11.	17 September 2007	Madrid, Spain	Hard	(Germany) Sabine Lisicki	6–2, 3–6, 6–3
Win	12.	24 September 2007	Granada, Spain	Hard	(Romania) Monica Niculescu	6–3, 6–4
Loss	8.	12 May 2008	Saint-Gaudens, France	Clay	(Czech Republic) Petra Cetkovská	4–6, 4–6

=== Doubles (23–16) ===
Result	No.	Date	Tournament	Surface	Partner	Opponents	Score
Loss	1.	11 May 1998	Tortosa, Spain	Clay	(Spain) Anabel Medina Garrigues	(Spain) Patricia Aznar (Spain) Cynthia Perez	0–6, 3–6
Loss	2.	11 October 1998	Girona, Spain	Clay	(Spain) Marta Marrero	(Spain) Rosa María Andrés Rodríguez (Spain) Lourdes Domínguez Lino	6–4, 1–6, 6–7
Win	1.	24 May 1999	Ceuta, Spain	Clay	(Spain) Rocío González	(Ukraine) Oleksandra Kravets (Spain) Nuria Llagostera Vives	7–6^{(4)}, 6–0
Win	2.	27 September 1999	Porto, Portugal	Clay	(Spain) Lourdes Domínguez Lino	(Spain) Alicia Ortuño (Czech Republic) Michaela Paštiková	3–6, 6–2, 6–1
Win	3.	3 June 2000	Modena, Italy	Clay	(Spain) Lourdes Domínguez Lino	(Slovenia) Tina Hergold (Slovenia) Maja Matevžič	6–4, 4–6, 6–3
Loss	3.	12 June 2000	Grado, Italy	Clay	(Spain) Lourdes Domínguez Lino	(Brazil) Vanessa Menga (Spain) Alicia Ortuño	6–3, 5–7, 1–6
Loss	4.	10 July 2000	Getxo, Spain	Clay	(Spain) Lourdes Domínguez Lino	(Croatia) Maja Palaveršić (Spain) Alicia Ortuño	1–6, 2–6
Win	4.	17 July 2000	Valladolid, Spain	Clay	(Spain) Alicia Ortuño	(Australia) Trudi Musgrave (United Kingdom) Lorna Woodroffe	6–2, 6–4
Win	5.	4 September 2000	Denain, France	Clay	(Spain) Lourdes Domínguez Lino	(Russia) Elena Bovina (Argentina) Mariana Díaz Oliva	6–4, 6–0
Loss	5.	23 April 2001	Caserta, Italy	Clay	(Spain) Gisela Riera	(Spain) Eva Bes (Spain) Lourdes Domínguez Lino	1–6, 6–7^{(5)}
Loss	6.	22 September 2002	Biella, Italy	Clay	(Spain) Anabel Medina Garrigues	(Bulgaria) Lubomira Bacheva (Spain) Eva Bes	5–7, 6–2, 6–7^{(5)}
Loss	7.	3 May 2003	Maglie, Italy	Clay	(Spain) Nuria Llagostera Vives	(Romania) Delia Sescioreanu (Romania) Edina Gallovits-Hall	4–6, 6–4, 3–6
Win	6.	22 June 2003	Périgueux, France	Clay	(Spain) Anabel Medina Garrigues	(Croatia) Lana Popadić (Madagascar) Natacha Randriantefy	6–0, 6–3
Win	7.	29 June 2003	Mont-de-Marsan, France	Clay	(Spain) Paula García	(France) Kildine Chevalier (Greece) Christina Zachariadou	6–4, 7–5
Loss	8.	11 August 2003	Martina Franca, Italy	Clay	(Spain) Paula García	(Bosnia and Herzegovina) Mervana Jugić-Salkić (Croatia) Darija Jurak	6–2, 4–6, 1–6
Win	8.	5 October 2003	Girona, Spain	Clay	(Spain) Conchita Martínez Granados	(Bulgaria) Lubomira Bacheva (Italy) Roberta Vinci	7–5, 6–3
Win	9.	21 February 2005	Melilla, Spain	Hard	(Spain) Sara Errani	(China) Sun Shengnan (China) Yang Shujing	6–7, 6–0, 7–5
Win	10.	6 August 2005	Vigo, Spain	Hard	(Spain) Anna Font	(Spain) Estrella Cabeza Candela (Spain) Matilde Muñoz Gonzalves	6–2, 6–3
Win	11.	21 August 2005	Coimbra, Portugal	Hard	(Portugal) Ana Catarina Nogueira	(Germany) Angelique Kerber (Germany) Tatjana Priachin	6–4, 7–6^{(1)}
Win	12.	18 September 2005	Bordeaux, France	Clay	(Spain) Conchita Martínez Granados	(Germany) Julia Schruff (Germany) Jasmin Wöhr	7–5, 6–2
Loss	9.	3 October 2005	Barcelona, Spain	Clay	(Spain) Conchita Martínez Granados	(Spain) Lourdes Domínguez Lino (Spain) María Sánchez Lorenzo	5–7, 7–6^{(4)}, 6–7^{(3)}
Win	13.	15 October 2005	Sevilla, Spain	Clay	(Italy) Sara Errani	(Romania) Gabriela Niculescu (Romania) Monica Niculescu	6–2, 7–6^{(5)}
Loss	10.	30 October 2005	Sant Cugat, Spain	Clay	(Spain) Conchita Martínez Granados	(Spain) Lourdes Domínguez Lino (Spain) Arantxa Parra Santonja	4–6, 3–6
Loss	11.	26 March 2006	Sabadell, Spain	Hard	(Spain) Marta Fraga	(Spain) Estrella Cabeza Candela (Spain) Núria Roig	1–6, 1–6
Loss	12.	15 April 2006	San Luis Potosí, Mexico	Clay	(Brazil) Joana Cortez	(Hungary) Zsófia Gubacsi (Croatia) Matea Mezak	6–4, 4–6, 4–6
Win	14.	11 June 2006	Móstoles, Spain	Hard	(Brazil) Joana Cortez	(Brazil) Carla Tiene (Brazil) Jenifer Widjaja	6–3, 6–2
Win	15.	18 June 2006	Marseille, France	Clay	(Spain) Conchita Martínez Granados	(France) Séverine Beltrame (France) Stéphanie Cohen-Aloro	7–5, 6–4
Win	16.	14 October 2006	Joué-lès-Tours, France	Hard (i)	(France) Stéphanie Cohen-Aloro	(Czech Republic) Barbora Strýcová (Czech Republic) Renata Voráčová	7–5, 7–5
Loss	13.	20 April 2007	Calvià, Spain	Clay	(Spain) Arantxa Parra Santonja	(Czech Republic) Petra Cetkovská (Czech Republic) Andrea Hlaváčková	5–7, 4–6
Win	17.	17 September 2007	Madrid, Spain	Clay	(Spain) Arantxa Parra Santonja	(Romania) Monica Niculescu (Ukraine) Yevgenia Savranska	6–1, 7–6^{(4)}
Win	18.	24 September 2007	Granada, Spain	Clay	(Spain) Marta Marrero	(Romania) Alexandra Dulgheru (Romania) Monica Niculescu	6–4, 6–1
Win	19.	8 October 2007	Reggio Calabria, Italy	Clay	(Spain) Marta Marrero	(Austria) Stefanie Haidner (Bosnia and Herzegovina) Sandra Martinović	6–1, 6–2
Win	20.	22 October 2007	Sant Cugat, Spain	Clay	(Spain) Nuria Llagostera Vives	(Hungary) Kira Nagy (France) Aurélie Védy	6–4, 6–1
Loss	14.	3 February 2008	Belford, France	Hard (i)	(Spain) Marta Marrero	(Czech Republic) Lucie Hradecká (Czech Republic) Andrea Sestini Hlaváčková	6–7^{(8)}, 4–6
Win	21.	15 March 2008	Las Palmas, Spain	Hard	(Spain) Marta Marrero	(Greece) Anna Gerasimou (United Kingdom) Anna Hawkins	6–2, 7–6^{(1)}
Loss	15.	31 March 2008	Patras, Greece	Clay	(Spain) Arantxa Parra Santonja	(Israel) Tzipora Obziler (Belarus) Anastasiya Yakimova	5–7, 1–6
Loss	16.	7 April 2008	Monzón, Spain	Hard	(Spain) Arantxa Parra Santonja	(Japan) Rika Fujiwara (Switzerland) Emmanuelle Gagliardi	6–1, 6–7^{(5)}, 8–10
Win	22.	14 April 2008	Saint-Malo, France	Clay	(Spain) Arantxa Parra Santonja	(Czech Republic) Renata Voráčová; (Belarus) Anastasiya Yakimova	6–2, 6–1
Win	23.	20 December 2015	Ankara, Turkey	Hard (i)	(Russia) Marina Melnikova	(Poland) Paula Kania (Netherlands) Lesley Pattinama Kerkhove	6–4, 5–7, [10–8]

== Team events ==
Outcome	No.	Date	Tournament	Surface	Partnering	Opponents	Score
Win	1.	9 January 2010	Hopman Cup, Perth, Western Australia	Hard	(Spain) Tommy Robredo	(United Kingdom) Andy Murray; (United Kingdom) Laura Robson	2–1

== Performance timelines ==
Key
W	F	SF	QF	#R	RR	Q#	DNQ	A	NH

(W) winner; (F) finalist; (SF) semifinalist; (QF) quarterfinalist; (#R) rounds 4, 3, 2, 1; (RR) round-robin stage; (Q#) qualification round; (DNQ) did not qualify; (A) absent; (NH) not held; (SR) strike rate (events won / competed); (W–L) win–loss record.

=== Singles ===
Tournament	2001	2002	2003	2004	2005	2006	2007	2008	2009	2010	2011	2012	2013	2016	2017	SR	W–L
Grand Slam tournaments
Australian Open	1R	1R	A	A	A	A	A	Q2	3R	2R	2R	A	Q1	Q2	A	0 / 5	4–5
French Open	1R	Q1	A	A	A	A	Q2	1R	3R	1R	2R	3R	A	A	A	0 / 6	5–6
Wimbledon	1R	A	A	A	A	Q3	Q1	3R	1R	A	3R	1R	A	A	A	0 / 5	4–5
US Open	1R	A	A	A	A	1R	Q2	1R	3R	2R	1R	2R	A	A	A	0 / 7	4–7
Win–loss	0–4	0–1	0–0	0–0	0–0	0–1	0–0	2–3	6–4	2–3	4–4	3–3	0-0	0–0	0–0	0 / 23	17–23
Premier Mandatory tournaments
Indian Wells	A	Q2	A	A	A	A	A	A	Q1	QF	3R	1R	A	A	A	0 / 3	4–3
Miami	1R	A	A	A	A	A	A	A	2R	2R	3R	A	A	A	A	0 / 4	2–4
Madrid	Not Held								1R	2R	1R	A	A	A	A	0 / 3	0–3
Beijing	Not Held			Not Tier I					3R	1R	2R	Q1	A	A	A	0 / 3	3–3
Premier 5 tournaments
Dubai	Not Tier I								A	2R	1R	NP5			Q2	0 / 2	1–2
Doha	No Premier Event								Not Held		NP5	1R	A	Q1	NP5	0 / 1	0–1
Rome	A	Q1	A	A	A	A	A	A	QF	W	1R	1R	A	A	A	1 / 4	9–3
Cincinnati	Not Held			Not Tier I					2R	A	1R	1R	A	A	A	0 / 3	1–3
Canada	A	A	A	A	A	1R	A	A	A	A	3R	1R	A	A	A	0 / 3	2–3
Tokyo	A	A	A	A	A	A	A	A	A	1R	1R	Q1	A	NP5		0 / 2	0–2
Wuhan	Not Held													A	A	0 / 0	0–0
Year-end ranking	92	278	348	—N/a	397	109	173	92	27	28	35	161	532	743	641		

=== Doubles ===
Tournament	2001	2002	2003	2004	2005	2006	2007	2008	2009	2010	2011	2012	2013	2014	2015	2016	2017	2018	SR	W–L
Grand Slam tournaments
Australian Open	A	2R	1R	A	A	A	A	A	QF	3R	2R	A	3R	A	A	1R	3R	1R	0 / 9	11–9
French Open	1R	2R	1R	A	A	A	3R	QF	1R	SF	3R	SF	1R	A	1R	2R	3R	QF	0 / 14	22–14
Wimbledon	1R	A	A	A	A	3R	2R	QF	QF	A	2R	QF	A	A	2R	2R	3R	3R	0 / 11	15–10
US Open	A	A	A	A	A	2R	A	2R	QF	1R	3R	SF	A	A	A	1R	QF		0 / 9	14–9
Win–loss	0–3	2–2	0–2	0–0	0–0	3–2	3–2	7–3	9–4	6–4	6–4	11–3	2–2	0–0	1–2	2–4	9–4	5–3	0 / 44	62–44
Year-end championships
WTA Tour Championships	A	A	A	A	A	A	A	A	W	A	A	A	A	A	A	A	QF		1 / 2	2–1
Olympic Games
Summer Olympics	Not Held			A	Not Held			1R	Not Held			2R	Not Held			A	Not Held		0 / 2	1–2
Premier Mandatory tournaments
Indian Wells	A	1R	A	A	A	A	A	A	SF	QF	1R	2R	1R	A	A	1R	2R	QF	0 / 9	9–9
Miami	A	A	A	A	A	A	A	A	QF	2R	SF	A	QF	A	QF	A	QF	2R	0 / 7	13–7
Madrid	Not Held								QF	SF	2R	SF	A	A	2R	A	A	SF	0 / 6	11–6
Beijing	T IV		Tier II						QF	QF	2R	2R	A	A	A	SF	QF		0 / 6	10–6
Premier 5 tournaments
Dubai	Tier II								A	W	W	Prem			A	Prem	2R	Prem	2 / 3	9–1
Doha	Tier III			Tier II				Tier I	Not Held		Prem	1R	A	A	Prem	SF	Prem	F	0 / 3	7–3
Rome	A	1R	1R	A	A	A	A	A	SF	F	QF	1R	2R	A	2R	A	1R	1R	0 / 10	7–10
Montréal / Toronto	A	A	A	A	A	1R	A	A	W	A	1R	1R	A	A	A	A	2R	SF	1 / 6	9–5
Cincinnati	NH			Tier III					F	A	1R	SF	A	A	A	1R	2R	QF	0 / 6	9–6
Tokyo	A	A	A	A	A	A	A	A	1R	1R	A	A	A	A	Premier				0 / 2	0–2
Wuhan	Premier														A	2R	2R		0 / 2	2–2
Year-end ranking	40	79	112	—N/a	131	62	108	30	6	15	21	15	129	—N/a	115	42	24			

Sporting positions
Preceded by (Russia) Elena Dementieva	Orange Bowl Girls' Singles Champion; Category: 18 and under 1999	Succeeded by (Russia) Vera Zvonareva
