= 2011 China Open – Women's doubles =

Women's doubles
- 2011 China Open

Final
- Champions: (Czech Republic) Květa Peschke (Slovenia) Katarina Srebotnik
- Runners-up: (Argentina) Gisela Dulko (Italy) Flavia Pennetta
- Score: 6–3, 6–4

Events
Singles	men	women
Doubles	men	women
← 2010 ·	China Open	· 2012 →

Chuang Chia-jung and Olga Govortsova were the defending champions. They lost to Daniela Hantuchová and Agnieszka Radwańska in the first round.

Květa Peschke and Katarina Srebotnik won this tournament by defeating Gisela Dulko and Flavia Pennetta in the final.

== Seeds ==
The top four seeds received a bye into the second round.

1. (Czech Republic) Květa Peschke / (Slovenia) Katarina Srebotnik (champions)
2. (United States) Liezel Huber / (United States) Lisa Raymond (semifinals)
3. (Argentina) Gisela Dulko / (Italy) Flavia Pennetta (final)
4. (United States) Vania King / (Kazakhstan) Yaroslava Shvedova (semifinals)
5. (Belarus) Victoria Azarenka / (Russia) Maria Kirilenko (second round)
6. (Czech Republic) Iveta Benešová / (Czech Republic) Barbora Záhlavová-Strýcová (second round)
7. (China) Peng Shuai / (China) Zheng Jie (quarterfinals)
8. (Slovakia) Daniela Hantuchová / (Poland) Agnieszka Radwańska (quarterfinals)

== Draw ==
=== Key ===
- Q = Qualifier
- WC = Wild card
- LL = Lucky loser
- Alt = Alternate
- SE = Special exempt
- PR = Protected ranking
- ITF = ITF entry
- JE = Junior exempt
- w/o = Walkover
- r = Retired
- d = Defaulted
- SR = Special ranking

=== Finals ===
Semifinals
1	(Czech Republic) Květa Peschke (Slovenia) Katarina Srebotnik	6	6
4	(United States) Vania King (Kazakhstan) Yaroslava Shvedova	4	4
3	(Argentina) Gisela Dulko (Italy) Flavia Pennetta	6	6
2	(United States) Liezel Huber (United States) Lisa Raymond	4	2

Final
1	(Czech Republic) Květa Peschke (Slovenia) Katarina Srebotnik	6	6
3	(Argentina) Gisela Dulko (Italy) Flavia Pennetta	3	4

=== Top half ===
First round
WC	(Czech Republic) Ka Plíšková (Czech Republic) Kr Plíšková	6	6
WC	(Russia) M Kondratieva (China) S Sun	3	3
(Spain) A Medina Garrigues (Russia) A Pavlyuchenkova	7^{7}	7
(Spain) N Llagostera Vives (Spain) A Parra Santonja	6^{3}	5
(Romania) M Niculescu (Australia) A Rodionova	5	6^{3}
5	(Belarus) V Azarenka (Russia) M Kirilenko	7	7^{7}
(Russia) A Kudryavtseva (Russia) E Makarova	4	3
(Italy) S Errani (Italy) R Vinci	6	6
(Australia) J Gajdošová (Slovenia) A Klepač	2
(South Africa) N Grandin (Czech Republic) V Uhlířová	0	r
(Chinese Taipei) C-j Chuang (Belarus) O Govortsova	6^{5}	1
8	(Slovakia) D Hantuchová (Poland) A Radwańska	7^{7}	6

Second round
1	(Czech Republic) K Peschke (Slovenia) K Srebotnik	6	4	[10]
WC	(Czech Republic) Ka Plíšková (Czech Republic) Kr Plíšková	2	6	[4]
(Spain) A Medina Garrigues (Russia) A Pavlyuchenkova	6	4	[10]
5	(Belarus) V Azarenka (Russia) M Kirilenko	2	6	[6]
4	(United States) V King (Kazakhstan) Y Shvedova	6	6
(Italy) S Errani (Italy) R Vinci	1	2
(Australia) J Gajdošová (Slovenia) A Klepač	4	5
8	(Slovakia) D Hantuchová (Poland) A Radwańska	6	7

Quarterfinals
1	(Czech Republic) K Peschke (Slovenia) K Srebotnik	6	7^{7}
(Spain) A Medina Garrigues (Russia) A Pavlyuchenkova	4	6^{5}
4	(United States) V King (Kazakhstan) Y Shvedova	6	7
8	(Slovakia) D Hantuchová (Poland) A Radwańska	0	5

Semifinals
1	(Czech Republic) K Peschke (Slovenia) K Srebotnik	6	6
4	(United States) V King (Kazakhstan) Y Shvedova	4	4

=== Bottom half ===
First round
7	(China) S Peng (China) J Zheng	7^{7}	6
(Japan) K Date-Krumm (China) S Zhang	6^{3}	4
Alt	(Italy) A Brianti (Romania) A Dulgheru	1	6	[4]
(Spain) MJ Martínez Sánchez (Czech Republic) K Zakopalová	6	4	[10]
(Chinese Taipei) S-w Hsieh (Kazakhstan) G Voskoboeva	6	6
(Russia) V Dushevina (Israel) S Pe'er	4	3
6	(Czech Republic) I Benešová (Czech Republic) B Záhlavová-Strýcová	7^{7}	4	[10]
Alt	(Uzbekistan) A Amanmuradova (Hungary) M Czink	6^{4}	6	[7]
(Greece) E Daniilidou (Ukraine) M Koryttseva	2	5
(United States) R Kops-Jones (United States) A Spears	6	7
(Poland) K Jans-Ignacik (Poland) A Rosolska	2	5
(Chinese Taipei) Y-j Chan (Czech Republic) L Hradecká	6	7

Second round
7	(China) S Peng (China) J Zheng	6	6
(Spain) MJ Martínez Sánchez (Czech Republic) K Zakopalová	2	3
(Chinese Taipei) S-w Hsieh (Kazakhstan) G Voskoboeva	4	6^{4}
3	(Argentina) G Dulko (Italy) F Pennetta	6	7^{7}
6	(Czech Republic) I Benešová (Czech Republic) B Záhlavová-Strýcová	1	4
(United States) R Kops-Jones (United States) A Spears	6	6
(Chinese Taipei) Y-j Chan (Czech Republic) L Hradecká	5	3
2	(United States) L Huber (United States) L Raymond	7	6

Quarterfinals
7	(China) S Peng (China) J Zheng	6	2	[3]
3	(Argentina) G Dulko (Italy) F Pennetta	4	6	[10]
(United States) R Kops-Jones (United States) A Spears	1	6	[5]
2	(United States) L Huber (United States) L Raymond	6	3	[10]

Semifinals
3	(Argentina) G Dulko (Italy) F Pennetta	6	6
2	(United States) L Huber (United States) L Raymond	4	2
