= 2011 China Open (tennis) =

- Date: October 1 – October 9
- Edition: 13th (ATP) / 15th (WTA)
- Category: ATP World Tour 500 (men); Premier Mandatory (women)

Champions

Men's singles
- (Czech Republic) Tomáš Berdych

Women's singles
- (Poland) Agnieszka Radwańska

Men's doubles
- (France) Michaël Llodra / (Serbia) Nenad Zimonjić

Women's doubles
- (Czech Republic) Květa Peschke / (Slovenia) Katarina Srebotnik
- China Open

The 2011 China Open was a tennis tournament played on outdoor hard courts. It was the 13th edition of the China Open for the men (15th for the women), and was part of the ATP 500 Series of the 2011 ATP World Tour, and of the Premier Series of the 2011 WTA Tour. Both the men's and the women's events were held at the Olympic Green Tennis Center in Beijing, People's Republic of China, from October 1 through October 9, 2011.

== Points and prize money ==
=== Point distribution ===
Stage	Men's singles	Men's doubles	Women's singles	Women's doubles
Champion	500		1000	
Runner up	300		700	
Semifinals	180		450	
Quarterfinals	90		250	
Round of 16	45	0	140	
Round of 32	0	–	80	5
Round of 64	–	–	5	–
Qualifier	20	–	30	–
Qualifying Finalist	10	–	20	–
Qualifying 1st round	0	–	1	–

=== Prize money ===
Stage	Men's singles	Men's doubles	Women's singles	Women's doubles
Champion	$505,000	$148,500	$775,500	$266,000
Runner up	$234,000	$68,000	$387,750	$133,000
Semifinals	$110,000	$33,000	$169,447	$53,000
Quarterfinals	$52,520	$15,500	$74,450	$22,260
Round of 16	$26,810	$7,920	$37,225	$9,350
Round of 32	$14,710	–	$19,950	$4,250
Round of 64	–	–	$11,817	–
Final round qualifying	$1,700	–	$2,610	–
First round qualifying	$900	–	$1,350	–

== WTA entrants ==
=== Seeds ===
Country	Player	Rank^{1}	Seed
DEN	Caroline Wozniacki	1	1
BLR	Victoria Azarenka	3	2
RUS	Vera Zvonareva	4	3
CHN	Li Na	5	4
CZE	Petra Kvitová	6	5
AUS	Samantha Stosur	7	6
ITA	Francesca Schiavone	8	7
FRA	Marion Bartoli	10	8
GER	Andrea Petkovic	11	9
SRB	Jelena Janković	12	10
POL	Agnieszka Radwańska	13	11
CHN	Peng Shuai	15	12
RUS	Anastasia Pavlyuchenkova	16	13
GER	Sabine Lisicki	17	14
ITA	Roberta Vinci	18	15
RUS	Svetlana Kuznetsova	19	16

- Rankings are as of September 26, 2011.

=== Other entrants ===
The following players received wildcards into the singles main draw:

- (Argentina) Gisela Dulko
- (China) Hu Yueyue
- (China) Zhang Shuai
- (China) Zheng Jie
- (China) Zheng Saisai

The following players received entry from the qualifying draw:

- (Greece) Eleni Daniilidou
- (United States) Christina McHale
- (Romania) Monica Niculescu
- (France) Virginie Razzano
- (United Kingdom) Laura Robson
- (South Africa) Chanelle Scheepers
- (Spain) Carla Suárez Navarro
- (Czech Republic) Barbora Záhlavová-Strýcová

=== Withdrawals ===
- (Russia) Maria Sharapova
- (Belgium) Yanina Wickmayer
- (United States) Serena Williams
- (United States) Venus Williams

== ATP entrants ==
=== Seeds ===
Country	Player	Rank^{1}	Seed
FRA	Jo-Wilfried Tsonga	7	1
FRA	Gaël Monfils	9	2
CZE	Tomáš Berdych	10	3
ESP	Nicolás Almagro	11	4
FRA	Gilles Simon	12	5
USA	Andy Roddick	14	6
USA	John Isner	18	7
UKR	Alexandr Dolgopolov	19	8

- Rankings are as of September 26, 2011.

=== Other entrants ===
The following players received wildcards into the singles main draw:

- (China) Li Zhe
- (China) Wu Di
- (China) Zhang Ze

The following players received entry from the qualifying draw:

- (Italy) Flavio Cipolla
- (Turkey) Marsel İlhan
- (Germany) Philipp Kohlschreiber
- (Spain) Albert Ramos

The following players received entry from a lucky loser spot:

- (Slovenia) Grega Žemlja
- (Chile) Paul Capdeville
- (Russia) Teymuraz Gabashvili

=== Withdrawals ===
- (Serbia) Novak Djokovic (muscle torn)
- (France) Richard Gasquet (elbow injury)
- (Sweden) Robin Söderling
- (France) Gaël Monfils (knee injury)
- (Russia) Nikolay Davydenko
- (United States) John Isner (abdominal strain)

== Champions ==
=== Men's singles ===
(Czech Republic) Tomáš Berdych def. (Croatia) Marin Čilić, 3–6, 6–4, 6–1

- It was Berdych's 1st title of the year and the 6th of his career.

=== Women's singles ===
(Poland) Agnieszka Radwańska def. (Germany) Andrea Petkovic, 7–5, 0–6, 6–4

- It was Radwańska's 3rd title of the year and 7th of her career.

=== Men's doubles ===
(France) Michaël Llodra / (Serbia) Nenad Zimonjić def. (Sweden) Robert Lindstedt / (Romania) Horia Tecău, 7–6^{(7–2)}, 7–6^{(7–4)}

=== Women's doubles ===
(Czech Republic) Květa Peschke / (Slovenia) Katarina Srebotnik def. (Argentina) Gisela Dulko / (Italy) Flavia Pennetta, 6–3, 6–4
