= 2014 China Open (tennis) =

Coordinates: 40.0228°N 116.3731°E

- Date: 27 September – 5 October
- Edition: 16th (ATP) / 18th (WTA)
- Category: ATP World Tour 500 (men); Premier Mandatory (women)
- Prize money: ATP $2,500,470; WTA $5,427,105
- Surface: Hard
- Location: Beijing, China
- Venue: National Tennis Center

Champions

Men's singles
- (Serbia) Novak Djokovic

Women's singles
- (Russia) Maria Sharapova

Men's doubles
- (Netherlands) Jean-Julien Rojer / (Romania) Horia Tecău

Women's doubles
- (Czech Republic) Andrea Hlaváčková / (China) Peng Shuai
| ← 2013 · | China Open | · 2015 → |

The 2014 China Open was a tennis tournament played on outdoor hard courts. It was the 16th edition of the China Open for the men (18th for the women). It was part of ATP World Tour 500 series on the 2014 ATP World Tour, and the last WTA Premier Mandatory tournament of the 2014 WTA Tour. Both the men's and the women's events were held at the National Tennis Center in Beijing, China, from September 27 to October 5, 2014.

== Points and prize money ==
=== Point distribution ===
| Event | W | F | SF | QF | Round of 16 | Round of 32 | Round of 64 | Q | Q2 | Q1 |
| Men's singles | 500 | 300 | 180 | 90 | 45 | 0 | — | 20 | 10 | 0 |
| Men's doubles | 500 | 300 | 180 | 90 | 0 | — | — | — | — | |
| Women's singles | 1000 | 650 | 390 | 215 | 120 | 65 | 10 | 30 | 20 | 2 |
| Women's doubles | 1000 | 650 | 390 | 215 | 120 | 5 | — | — | — | — |

== ATP singles main-draw entrants ==
=== Seeds ===
| Country | Player | Rank^{1} | Seed |
|---|---|---|---|
| SRB | Novak Djokovic | 1 | 1 |
| ESP | Rafael Nadal | 2 | 2 |
| CZE | Tomáš Berdych | 6 | 3 |
| CRO | Marin Čilić | 9 | 4 |
| BUL | Grigor Dimitrov | 10 | 5 |
| GBR | Andy Murray | 11 | 6 |
| LAT | Ernests Gulbis | 13 | 7 |
| USA | John Isner | 15 | 8 |

- ^{1} Rankings are as of September 29, 2014

=== Other entrants ===
The following players received wildcards into the singles main draw:

- (China) Bai Yan
- (Spain) Feliciano López
- (United Kingdom) Andy Murray
- (Serbia) Viktor Troicki

The following players received entry from the qualifying draw:

- (Russia) Teymuraz Gabashvili
- (Germany) Peter Gojowczyk
- (Slovakia) Martin Kližan
- (Kazakhstan) Mikhail Kukushkin

=== Withdrawals ===
Before the tournament

- (Chinese Taipei) Lu Yen-hsun (playing at the Asian Games) → replaced by (Canada) Vasek Pospisil
- (Russia) Dmitry Tursunov → replaced by (Spain) Pablo Andújar

=== Retirements ===
- (Latvia) Ernests Gulbis

== ATP doubles main-draw entrants ==
=== Seeds ===
| Country | Player | Country | Player | Rank^{1} | Seed |
|---|---|---|---|---|---|
| CAN | Daniel Nestor | SRB | Nenad Zimonjić | 7 | 1 |
| AUT | Alexander Peya | BRA | Bruno Soares | 10 | 2 |
| ~~ESP~~ | ~~David Marrero~~ | ~~ESP~~ | ~~Fernando Verdasco~~ | ~~26~~ | ~~3~~ |
| FRA | Julien Benneteau | CAN | Vasek Pospisil | 29 | 4 |

- Rankings are as of September 22, 2014

=== Other entrants ===
The following pairs received wildcards into the doubles main draw:

- (Serbia) Novak Djokovic / (Serbia) Filip Krajinović
- (China) Liu Siyu / (China) Ning Yuqing

The following pair received entry from the qualifying draw:

- (Sweden) Johan Brunström / (United States) Nicholas Monroe

The following pair received entry as lucky losers:

- (Russia) Teymuraz Gabashvili / (Kazakhstan) Mikhail Kukushkin

=== Withdrawals ===
Before the tournament

- (Spain) Fernando Verdasco (personal reasons)

During the tournament

- (Latvia) Ernests Gulbis
- (Serbia) Filip Krajinović (sickness)

== WTA singles main-draw entrants ==
=== Seeds ===
| Country | Player | Rank^{1} | Seed |
|---|---|---|---|
| USA | Serena Williams | 1 | 1 |
| ROU | Simona Halep | 2 | 2 |
| CZE | Petra Kvitová | 3 | 3 |
| RUS | Maria Sharapova | 4 | 4 |
| POL | Agnieszka Radwańska | 6 | 5 |
| DEN | Caroline Wozniacki | 7 | 6 |
| GER | Angelique Kerber | 8 | 7 |
| CAN | Eugenie Bouchard | 9 | 8 |
| SRB | Ana Ivanovic | 10 | 9 |
| SRB | Jelena Janković | 11 | 10 |
| ITA | Sara Errani | 12 | 11 |
| RUS | Ekaterina Makarova | 14 | 12 |
| CZE | Lucie Šafářová | 15 | 13 |
| ITA | Flavia Pennetta | 16 | 14 |
| GER | Andrea Petkovic | 17 | 15 |
| USA | Venus Williams | 18 | 16 |

- ^{1} Rankings as of September 22, 2014.

=== Other entrants ===
The following players received wildcards into the singles main draw:

- (Russia) Maria Kirilenko
- (Italy) Francesca Schiavone
- (China) Xu Shilin
- (China) Zhang Kailin
- (China) Zhu Lin

The following player received entry using a protected ranking into the singles main draw:

- (Switzerland) Romina Oprandi

The following players received entry from the qualifying draw:

- (Germany) Mona Barthel
- (Switzerland) Belinda Bencic
- (Slovenia) Polona Hercog
- (United States) Bethanie Mattek-Sands
- (Romania) Monica Niculescu
- (Bulgaria) Tsvetana Pironkova
- (Spain) Sílvia Soler Espinosa
- (China) Xu Yifan

=== Withdrawals ===
Before the tournament

- (Belarus) Victoria Azarenka (foot injury) → replaced by (Estonia) Kaia Kanepi
- (Slovakia) Dominika Cibulková → replaced by (United States) Lauren Davis
- (China) Li Na (retirement from professional tennis) → replaced by (Belgium) Kirsten Flipkens
- (United States) Sloane Stephens → replaced by (Kazakhstan) Yaroslava Shvedova
- (Russia) Vera Zvonareva → replaced by (Kazakhstan) Zarina Diyas

During the tournament

- (Romania) Simona Halep (hip injury)
- (United States) Serena Williams (knee injury)
- (United States) Venus Williams (viral illness)

=== Retirements ===
- (Slovakia) Daniela Hantuchová (left knee injury)
- (Russia) Anastasia Pavlyuchenkova (dizziness)

== WTA doubles main-draw entrants ==
=== Seeds ===
| Country | Player | Country | Player | Rank^{1} | Seed |
|---|---|---|---|---|---|
| ITA | Sara Errani | ITA | Roberta Vinci | 2 | 1 |
| ZIM | Cara Black | IND | Sania Mirza | 10 | 2 |
| CZE | Květa Peschke | SLO | Katarina Srebotnik | 19 | 3 |
| USA | Raquel Kops-Jones | USA | Abigail Spears | 22 | 4 |
| CZE | Andrea Hlaváčková | CHN | Peng Shuai | 25 | 5 |
| RUS | Alla Kudryavtseva | AUS | Anastasia Rodionova | 32 | 6 |
| ESP | Garbiñe Muguruza | ESP | Carla Suárez Navarro | 34 | 7 |
| SUI | Martina Hingis | ITA | Flavia Pennetta | 38 | 8 |

- ^{1} Rankings are as of September 22, 2014

=== Other entrants ===
The following pairs received wildcards into the doubles main draw:

- (Romania) Simona Halep / (Romania) Raluca Olaru
- (China) Han Xinyun / (China) Zhang Kailin
- (United States) Bethanie Mattek-Sands / (China) Zheng Saisai

The following pair received entry as alternates:

- (Germany) Mona Barthel / (Luxembourg) Mandy Minella

=== Withdrawals ===
Before the tournament

- (Slovakia) Daniela Hantuchová (left knee injury)

During the tournament

- (Australia) Casey Dellacqua (lower leg injury)
- (Romania) Simona Halep (hip injury)

== Champions ==
=== Men's singles ===
- (Serbia) Novak Djokovic def. (Czech Republic) Tomáš Berdych, 6–0, 6–2

=== Women's singles ===
- (Russia) Maria Sharapova def. (Czech Republic) Petra Kvitová, 6–4, 2–6, 6–3

=== Men's doubles ===
- (Netherlands) Jean-Julien Rojer / (Romania) Horia Tecău def. (France) Julien Benneteau / (Canada) Vasek Pospisil, 6–7^{(6–8)}, 7–5, [10–5]

=== Women's doubles ===
- (Czech Republic) Andrea Hlaváčková / (China) Peng Shuai def. (Zimbabwe) Cara Black / (India) Sania Mirza, 6–4, 6–4
