= 2013 China Open (tennis) =

Coordinates: 40.0228°N 116.3731°E

- Date: 28 September – 6 October
- Edition: 15th (ATP) / 17th (WTA)
- Category: ATP World Tour 500 (men); Premier Mandatory (women)
- Surface: Hard
- Location: Beijing, China
- Venue: National Tennis Center

Champions

Men's singles
- (Serbia) Novak Djokovic

Women's singles
- (United States) Serena Williams

Men's doubles
- (Belarus) Max Mirnyi / (Romania) Horia Tecău

Women's doubles
- (Zimbabwe) Cara Black / (India) Sania Mirza
← 2012 ·	China Open	· 2014 →

The 2013 China Open was a tennis tournament that took place on outdoor hard courts. It was the 15th edition of the China Open for the men and (17th for the women), and was part of the ATP 500 Series of the 2013 ATP World Tour, and the Premier Series of the 2013 WTA Tour. Both the men's and the women's events were held at the National Tennis Center in Beijing, China, from September 28 to October 6, 2013.

== Finals ==
=== Men's singles ===
- (Serbia) Novak Djokovic defeated (Spain) Rafael Nadal, 6–3, 6-4

=== Women's singles ===
- (United States) Serena Williams defeated (Serbia) Jelena Janković, 6–2, 6–2

=== Men's doubles ===
- (Belarus) Max Mirnyi / (Romania) Horia Tecău defeated (Italy) Fabio Fognini / (Italy) Andreas Seppi, 6–4, 6–2

=== Women's doubles ===
- (Zimbabwe) Cara Black / (India) Sania Mirza defeated (Russia) Vera Dushevina / (Spain) Arantxa Parra Santonja, 6–2, 6–2

== Points and prize money ==
=== Point distribution ===
Event	W	F	SF	QF	Round of 16	Round of 32	Round of 64	Q	Q2	Q1
Men's singles	500	300	180	90	45	0	—	20	10	0
Men's doubles	500	300	180	90	0	—	—	—	—	
Women's singles	1000	700	450	250	140	80	5	30	20	1
Women's doubles	1000	700	450	250	140	5	—	—	—	—

=== Prize money ===
Event	W	F	SF	QF	Round of 16	Round of 32	Round of 64	Q2	Q1
Men's singles	$557,100	$251,165	$118,975	$57,410	$29,270	$16,100	—	$1,815	$1,000
Men's doubles	$164,580	$74,250	$35,000	$16,920	$8,690	—	—	—	—
Women's singles	$860,000	$430,365	$210,000	$100,900	$48,550	$23,500	$13,500	$3,600	$2,100
Women's doubles	$291,000	$146,000	$65,000	$30,000	$14,000	$6,500	—	—	—

== ATP singles main-draw entrants ==
=== Seeds ===
Country	Player	Rank^{1}	Seed
SRB	Novak Djokovic	1	1
ESP	Rafael Nadal	2	2
ESP	David Ferrer	4	3
CZE	Tomáš Berdych	6	4
FRA	Richard Gasquet	9	5
SUI	Stanislas Wawrinka	10	6
GER	Tommy Haas	13	7
USA	John Isner	16	8

- ^{1} Rankings are as of September 23, 2013

=== Other entrants ===
The following players received wildcards into the singles main draw:

- (Australia) Lleyton Hewitt
- (China) Wu Di
- (China) Zhang Ze

The following players received entry from the qualifying draw:

- (Spain) Roberto Bautista Agut
- (India) Somdev Devvarman
- (Colombia) Santiago Giraldo
- (Chinese Taipei) Yen-hsun Lu

=== Withdrawals ===
Before the tournament

- (Croatia) Marin Čilić (suspension)
- (Latvia) Ernests Gulbis
- (Poland) Jerzy Janowicz (back injury)
- (Slovakia) Martin Kližan

During the tournament

- (Russia) Nikolay Davydenko (right wrist injury)

=== Retirements ===
- (Czech Republic) Tomáš Berdych (back injury)

== ATP doubles main-draw entrants ==
=== Seeds ===
Country	Player	Country	Player	Rank^{1}	Seed
CAN	Daniel Nestor	IND	Leander Paes	19	1
IND	Mahesh Bhupathi	SWE	Robert Lindstedt	28	2
PAK	Aisam-ul-Haq Qureshi	NED	Jean-Julien Rojer	29	3
FRA	Julien Benneteau	SRB	Nenad Zimonjić	36	4

- Rankings are as of September 23, 2013

=== Other entrants ===
The following pairs received wildcards into the doubles main draw:

- (China) Gong Maoxin / (China) Li Zhe
- (Chinese Taipei) Lu Yen-hsun / (China) Wu Di

=== Withdrawals ===
During the tournament

- (Switzerland) Stanislas Wawrinka (right leg injury)

== WTA singles main-draw entrants ==
=== Seeds ===
Country	Player	Rank^{1}	Seed
USA	Serena Williams	1	1
BLR	Victoria Azarenka	2	2
POL	Agnieszka Radwańska	4	3
CHN	Li Na	5	4
ITA	Sara Errani	6	5
DEN	Caroline Wozniacki	8	6
GER	Angelique Kerber	9	7
SER	Jelena Janković	10	8
CZE	Petra Kvitová	11	9
ITA	Roberta Vinci	12	10
USA	Sloane Stephens	13	11
ESP	Carla Suárez Navarro	14	12
GER	Sabine Lisicki	15	13
SER	Ana Ivanovic	16	14
AUS	Samantha Stosur	17	15
ROU	Simona Halep	18	16

- ^{1} Rankings are as of September 23, 2013

=== Other entrants ===
The following players received wildcards into the singles main draw:

- (Italy) Francesca Schiavone
- (United Kingdom) Heather Watson
- (China) Zhang Shuai
- (China) Zheng Jie

The following players received entry from the qualifying draw:

- (Canada) Eugenie Bouchard
- (United States) Lauren Davis
- (Japan) Misaki Doi
- (Canada) Sharon Fichman
- (Slovenia) Polona Hercog
- (South Africa) Chanelle Scheepers
- (Spain) Sílvia Soler Espinosa
- (Kazakhstan) Galina Voskoboeva

=== Withdrawals ===
Before the tournament

- (France) Marion Bartoli (retirement) → replaced by Daniela Hantuchová
- (United States) Jamie Hampton (left ankle injury) → replaced by Julia Görges
- (Russia) Ekaterina Makarova → replaced by Monica Puig
- (Switzerland) Romina Oprandi → replaced by Bojana Jovanovski
- (Russia) Nadia Petrova (left hip injury) → replaced by Stefanie Vögele
- (Russia) Maria Sharapova (right shoulder injury) → replaced by Annika Beck

=== Retirements ===
- (France) Alizé Cornet (back injury)

== WTA doubles main-draw entrants ==
=== Seeds ===
Country	Player	Country	Player	Rank^{1}	Seed
ITA	Sara Errani	ITA	Roberta Vinci	2	1
TPE	Hsieh Su-wei	CHN	Peng Shuai	18	2
AUS	Ashleigh Barty	AUS	Casey Dellacqua	23	3
SRB	Jelena Janković	SLO	Katarina Srebotnik	26	4
GER	Anna-Lena Grönefeld	CZE	Květa Peschke	27	5
USA	Raquel Kops-Jones	USA	Abigail Spears	34	6
~~NZL~~	~~Marina Erakovic~~	~~RUS~~	~~Elena Vesnina~~	~~35~~	~~7~~
ZIM	Cara Black	IND	Sania Mirza	39	8

- ^{1} Rankings are as of September 23, 2013

=== Other entrants ===
The following pairs received wildcards into the doubles main draw:

- (Russia) Svetlana Kuznetsova / (Australia) Samantha Stosur
- (Kazakhstan) Yaroslava Shvedova / (China) Zhang Shuai
- (China) Sun Ziyue / (China) Zhang Yuxuan
- (United States) Serena Williams / (United States) Venus Williams

The following pair received entry as alternates:

- (Spain) Sílvia Soler Espinosa / (Spain) Carla Suárez Navarro

=== Withdrawals ===
Before the tournament

- (New Zealand) Marina Erakovic (personal reasons)
- (Switzerland) Martina Hingis (personal reasons)
