= 2014 China Open – Women's doubles =

Women's doubles
- 2014 China Open

Final
- Champions: (Czech Republic) Andrea Hlaváčková (China) Peng Shuai
- Runners-up: (Zimbabwe) Cara Black (India) Sania Mirza
- Score: 6–4, 6–4

Events
Singles	men	women
Doubles	men	women
← 2013 ·	China Open	· 2015 →

Cara Black and Sania Mirza were the defending champions, but lost in the final to Andrea Hlaváčková and Peng Shuai, 4–6, 4–6.

== Seeds ==
1. (Italy) Sara Errani / (Italy) Roberta Vinci (quarterfinals)
2. (Zimbabwe) Cara Black / (India) Sania Mirza (final)
3. (Czech Republic) Květa Peschke / (Slovenia) Katarina Srebotnik (second round)
4. (United States) Raquel Kops-Jones / (United States) Abigail Spears (quarterfinals)
5. (Czech Republic) Andrea Hlaváčková / (China) Peng Shuai (champions)
6. (Russia) Alla Kudryavtseva / (Australia) Anastasia Rodionova (semifinals)
7. (Spain) Garbiñe Muguruza / (Spain) Carla Suárez Navarro (quarterfinals)
8. (Switzerland) Martina Hingis / (Italy) Flavia Pennetta (second round)

== Draw ==
=== Key ===
- Q = Qualifier
- WC = Wild card
- LL = Lucky loser
- Alt = Alternate
- SE = Special exempt
- PR = Protected ranking
- ITF = ITF entry
- JE = Junior exempt
- w/o = Walkover
- r = Retired
- d = Defaulted
- SR = Special ranking

=== Finals ===
Semifinals
6	(Russia) Alla Kudryavtseva (Australia) Anastasia Rodionova	1	4
5	(Czech Republic) Andrea Hlaváčková (China) Peng Shuai	6	6
(France) Kristina Mladenovic (Russia) Anastasia Pavlyuchenkova	7	1	[6]
2	(Zimbabwe) Cara Black (India) Sania Mirza	5	6	[10]

Final
5	(Czech Republic) Andrea Hlaváčková (China) Peng Shuai	6	6
2	(Zimbabwe) Cara Black (India) Sania Mirza	4	4

=== Top half ===
First round
WC	(China) X Han (China) K Zhang	6	3	[10]
(Poland) K Jans-Ignacik (Czech Republic) Ka Plíšková	4	6	[6]
Alt	(Germany) M Barthel (Luxembourg) M Minella	7^{9}	6
WC	(United States) B Mattek-Sands (China) S Zheng	6^{7}	3
(France) A Cornet (Poland) M Linette	7^{7}	1	[7]
6	(Russia) A Kudryavtseva (Australia) A Rodionova	6^{5}	6	[10]
(Australia) S Stosur (China) S Zhang	6	2	[10]
(Australia) J Gajdošová (Croatia) A Tomljanović	3	6	[12]
(Chinese Taipei) C-j Chuang (Belarus) O Govortsova	6^{0}	6	[10]
(New Zealand) M Erakovic (Spain) A Parra Santonja	7^{7}	3	[6]
(Spain) A Medina Garrigues (Kazakhstan) Y Shvedova	5	2
5	(Czech Republic) A Hlaváčková (China) S Peng	7	6

Second round
1	(Italy) S Errani (Italy) R Vinci	6	6
WC	(China) X Han (China) K Zhang	2	3
Alt	(Germany) M Barthel (Luxembourg) M Minella	4	7^{7}	[7]
6	(Russia) A Kudryavtseva (Australia) A Rodionova	6	6^{5}	[10]
3	(Czech Republic) K Peschke (Slovenia) K Srebotnik	2	6	[3]
(Australia) J Gajdošová (Croatia) A Tomljanović	6	3	[10]
(Chinese Taipei) C-j Chuang (Belarus) O Govortsova	3	2
5	(Czech Republic) A Hlaváčková (China) S Peng	6	6

Quarterfinals
1	(Italy) S Errani (Italy) R Vinci	6^{3}	6	[8]
6	(Russia) A Kudryavtseva (Australia) A Rodionova	7^{7}	2	[10]
(Australia) J Gajdošová (Croatia) A Tomljanović	4	5
5	(Czech Republic) A Hlaváčková (China) S Peng	6	7

Semifinals
6	(Russia) A Kudryavtseva (Australia) A Rodionova	1	4
5	(Czech Republic) A Hlaváčková (China) S Peng	6	6

=== Bottom half ===
First round
8	(Switzerland) M Hingis (Italy) F Pennetta	6	6
(United States) A Riske (United Kingdom) H Watson	1	3
(France) K Mladenovic (Russia) A Pavlyuchenkova	6	6
(China) Y Xu (China) J Zheng	2	0
(Germany) A-L Grönefeld (Poland) A Rosolska	6	4
(Slovenia) A Klepač (Spain) S Soler Espinosa	7^{5}	6
7	(Spain) G Muguruza (Spain) C Suárez Navarro	6	6
(United States) C McHale (South Africa) C Scheepers	2	2
WC	(Romania) S Halep (Romania) R Olaru	6	7^{7}
(Georgia (country)) O Kalashnikova (Czech Republic) K Koukalová	4	6^{4}
(Australia) C Dellacqua (United States) L Raymond	6	6
(Croatia) D Jurak (United States) M Moulton-Levy	0	2

Second round
8	(Switzerland) M Hingis (Italy) F Pennetta	3	6	[6]
(France) K Mladenovic (Russia) A Pavlyuchenkova	6	3	[10]
(Slovenia) A Klepač (Spain) S Soler Espinosa	2	0
4	(United States) R Kops-Jones (United States) A Spears	6	6
7	(Spain) G Muguruza (Spain) C Suárez Navarro	w/o
WC	(Romania) S Halep (Romania) R Olaru
(Australia) C Dellacqua (United States) L Raymond
2	(Zimbabwe) C Black (India) S Mirza	w/o

Quarterfinals
(France) K Mladenovic (Russia) A Pavlyuchenkova	3	7^{9}	[10]
4	(United States) R Kops-Jones (United States) A Spears	6	6^{7}	[6]
7	(Spain) G Muguruza (Spain) C Suárez Navarro	3	1
2	(Zimbabwe) C Black (India) S Mirza	6	6

Semifinals
(France) K Mladenovic (Russia) A Pavlyuchenkova	7	1	[6]
2	(Zimbabwe) C Black (India) S Mirza	5	6	[10]
