= 2012 China Open – Women's doubles =

Women's doubles
- 2012 China Open

Final
- Champions: (Russia) Ekaterina Makarova (Russia) Elena Vesnina
- Runners-up: (Spain) Nuria Llagostera Vives (India) Sania Mirza
- Score: 7–5, 7–5

Events
Singles	men	women
Doubles	men	women
← 2011 ·	China Open	· 2013 →

Květa Peschke and Katarina Srebotnik were the defending champions, but decided not to play together. Peschke partnered with Anna-Lena Grönefeld, but lost in the quarterfinals to Maria Kirilenko and Nadia Petrova. Srebotnik played alongside Zheng Jie, but lost in the semifinals to Nuria Llagostera Vives and Sania Mirza.
Third seeds Ekaterina Makarova and Elena Vesnina won the title, defeating Llagostera Vives and Mirza in the final by the score of 7–5, 7–5.

== Seeds ==
The top four seeds received a bye into the second round.

1. (Italy) Sara Errani / (Italy) Roberta Vinci (withdrew, due to left thigh injury for Errani)
2. (Russia) Maria Kirilenko / (Russia) Nadia Petrova (semifinals)
3. (Russia) Ekaterina Makarova / (Russia) Elena Vesnina (champions)
4. (United States) Vania King / (Kazakhstan) Yaroslava Shvedova (second round)
5. (Spain) Nuria Llagostera Vives / (India) Sania Mirza (final)
6. (Slovenia) Katarina Srebotnik / (China) Zheng Jie (semifinals)
7. (Germany) Anna-Lena Grönefeld / (Czech Republic) Květa Peschke (quarterfinals)
8. (United States) Raquel Kops-Jones / (United States) Abigail Spears (quarterfinals)

== Draw ==
=== Key ===
- Q = Qualifier
- WC = Wild card
- LL = Lucky loser
- Alt = Alternate
- SE = Special exempt
- PR = Protected ranking
- ITF = ITF entry
- JE = Junior exempt
- w/o = Walkover
- r = Retired
- d = Defaulted
- SR = Special ranking

=== Finals ===
Semifinals

Final

6
- (Slovenia) Katarina Srebotnik
- (China) Zheng Jie
5
1

5
- (Spain) Nuria Llagostera Vives
- (India) Sania Mirza
7
6

5
- (Spain) Nuria Llagostera Vives
- (India) Sania Mirza
5
5

3
- (Russia) Ekaterina Makarova
- (Russia) Elena Vesnina
7
7

3
- (Russia) Ekaterina Makarova
- (Russia) Elena Vesnina
6
7

2
- (Russia) Maria Kirilenko
- (Russia) Nadia Petrova
4
5

=== Top half ===
First round

Second round

Quarterfinals

Semifinals

Alt
- (China) W Liu
- (China) S Sun
4
6^{5}

- (Hungary) T Babos
- (Luxembourg) M Minella
2
2

- (Russia) V Dushevina
- (Poland) A Rosolska
6
7^{7}

- (Russia) V Dushevina
- (Poland) A Rosolska
6
6

- (Russia) V Dushevina
- (Poland) A Rosolska
3
3

- (South Africa) N Grandin
- (Czech Republic) V Uhlířová
4
3

6
- (Slovenia) K Srebotnik
- (China) J Zheng
6
6

- (Chinese Taipei) C-j Chuang
- (China) S Zhang
6
6

- (Chinese Taipei) C-j Chuang
- (China) S Zhang
5
4

- (Slovakia) D Cibulková
- (Slovakia) J Husárová
5
4

6
- (Slovenia) K Srebotnik
- (China) J Zheng
7
6

6
- (Slovenia) K Srebotnik
- (China) J Zheng
7
6

6
- (Slovenia) K Srebotnik
- (China) J Zheng
5
1

5
- (Spain) N Llagostera Vives
- (India) S Mirza
7
6

4
- (United States) V King
- (Kazakhstan) Y Shvedova
6^{6}
2

- (United States) L Raymond
- (Australia) S Stosur
6^{4}
6
[6]

- (Germany) J Görges
- (Czech Republic) B Záhlavová-Strýcová
7^{8}
6

- (Germany) J Görges
- (Czech Republic) B Záhlavová-Strýcová
7^{7}
4
[10]

- (Germany) J Görges
- (Czech Republic) B Záhlavová-Strýcová
6
4
[14]

- (Georgia (country)) A Tatishvili
- (Kazakhstan) G Voskoboeva
7^{7}
2
[4]

5
- (Spain) N Llagostera Vives
- (India) S Mirza
4
6
[16]

- (Switzerland) T Bacsinszky
- (Spain) MJ Martínez Sánchez
6^{1}
6
[10]

- (Switzerland) T Bacsinszky
- (Spain) MJ Martínez Sánchez
6
3
[9]

- (Croatia) P Martić
- (United Kingdom) H Watson
3
4

5
- (Spain) N Llagostera Vives
- (India) S Mirza
4
6
[11]

5
- (Spain) N Llagostera Vives
- (India) S Mirza
6
6

=== Bottom half ===
First round

Second round

Quarterfinals

Semifinals

8
- (United States) R Kops-Jones
- (United States) A Spears
6^{3}
6
[10]

Alt
- (Colombia) C Castaño
- (France) V Razzano
7^{7}
4
[5]

8
- (United States) R Kops-Jones
- (United States) A Spears
4
7^{7}
[10]

- (Belarus) O Govortsova
- (Romania) M Niculescu
3
2

- (Slovakia) D Hantuchová
- (China) S Peng
6
6^{4}
[6]

- (Slovakia) D Hantuchová
- (China) S Peng
6
6

8
- (United States) R Kops-Jones
- (United States) A Spears
4
6
[1]

WC
- (China) H Tang
- (China) R Tian
3
6
[13]

3
- (Russia) E Makarova
- (Russia) E Vesnina
6
3
[10]

WC
- (China) Z Yan
- (China) S Zheng
6
1
[11]

WC
- (China) H Tang
- (China) R Tian
2
3

3
- (Russia) E Makarova
- (Russia) E Vesnina
6
6

3
- (Russia) E Makarova
- (Russia) E Vesnina
6
7

7
- (Germany) A-L Grönefeld
- (Czech Republic) K Peschke
6
6

2
- (Russia) M Kirilenko
- (Russia) N Petrova
4
5

- (France) A Cornet
- (Japan) K Date-Krumm
3
1

7
- (Germany) A-L Grönefeld
- (Czech Republic) K Peschke
7
6

- (Australia) C Dellacqua
- (Poland) K Jans-Ignacik
1
1

- (Chinese Taipei) S-w Hsieh
- (Spain) A Medina Garrigues
5
4

- (Chinese Taipei) S-w Hsieh
- (Spain) A Medina Garrigues
6
6

7
- (Germany) A-L Grönefeld
- (Czech Republic) K Peschke
6^{5}
7^{7}
[6]

WC
- (Serbia) J Janković
- (Germany) A Petkovic
6
6

2
- (Russia) M Kirilenko
- (Russia) N Petrova
7^{7}
6^{4}
[10]

- (Croatia) D Jurak
- (Hungary) K Marosi
3
1

WC
- (Serbia) J Janković
- (Germany) A Petkovic
3
6
[6]

2
- (Russia) M Kirilenko
- (Russia) N Petrova
6
3
[10]
