= 2014 China Open – Men's singles =

Men's singles
- 2014 China Open

Final
- Champion: (Serbia) Novak Djokovic
- Runner-up: (Czech Republic) Tomáš Berdych
- Score: 6–0, 6–2

Events
| Singles | men | women |
| Doubles | men | women |
| ← 2013 · | China Open | · 2015 → |

Two-time defending champion Novak Djokovic defeated Tomáš Berdych in the final, 6–0, 6–2 to win the men's singles tennis title at the 2014 China Open.

== Seeds ==
1. (Serbia) Novak Djokovic (champion)
2. (Spain) Rafael Nadal (quarterfinals)
3. (Czech Republic) Tomáš Berdych (final)
4. (Croatia) Marin Čilić (quarterfinals)

5. (Bulgaria) Grigor Dimitrov (quarterfinals)
6. (United Kingdom) Andy Murray (semifinals)
7. (Latvia) Ernests Gulbis (second round, retired because of shoulder injury)
8. (United States) John Isner (quarterfinals)

== Draw ==
=== Key ===
- Q = Qualifier
- WC = Wild card
- LL = Lucky loser
- Alt = Alternate
- SE = Special exempt
- PR = Protected ranking
- ITF = ITF entry
- JE = Junior exempt
- w/o = Walkover
- r = Retired
- d = Defaulted
- SR = Special ranking

=== Finals ===
Semifinals
1 | (Serbia) Novak Djokovic | 6 | 6
6/WC | (United Kingdom) Andy Murray | 3 | 4
3 | (Czech Republic) Tomáš Berdych | 6 | 6
Q | (Slovakia) Martin Kližan | 4 | 1

Final
1 | (Serbia) Novak Djokovic | 6 | 6
3 | (Czech Republic) Tomáš Berdych | 0 | 2

=== Section top half ===
First round
1 | (Serbia) N Djokovic | 6 | 6
(Spain) G García-López | 2 | 1
(Czech Republic) L Rosol | 4 | 3
(Canada) V Pospisil | 6 | 6
(France) J Benneteau | 4 | 1
(Spain) P Andújar | 6 | 6
(Spain) F Verdasco | 1 | 6 | 3
5 | (Bulgaria) G Dimitrov | 6 | 3 | 6
4 | (Croatia) M Čilić | 6 | 6
WC | (China) Y Bai | 3 | 4
(Portugal) J Sousa | 1 | 7^{7} | 6
Q | (Russia) T Gabashvili | 6 | 6^{4} | 4
Q | (Kazakhstan) M Kukushkin | 6^{3} | 6 | 4
(Uruguay) P Cuevas | 7^{7} | 3 | 6
(Poland) J Janowicz | 7^{11} | 4 | 2
6/WC | (United Kingdom) A Murray | 6^{9} | 6 | 6

Second round
1 | (Serbia) N Djokovic | 6 | 7
(Canada) V Pospisil | 3 | 5
(Spain) P Andújar | 4 | 4
5 | (Bulgaria) G Dimitrov | 6 | 6
4 | (Croatia) M Čilić | 6 | 6
(Portugal) J Sousa | 3 | 3
(Uruguay) P Cuevas | 2 | 2
6/WC | (United Kingdom) A Murray | 6 | 6

Quarterfinals
1 | (Serbia) N Djokovic | 6 | 6
5 | (Bulgaria) G Dimitrov | 2 | 4
4 | (Croatia) M Čilić | 1 | 4
6/WC | (United Kingdom) A Murray | 6 | 6

Semifinals
1 | (Serbia) N Djokovic | 6 | 6
6/WC | (United Kingdom) A Murray | 3 | 4

=== Section bottom half ===
First round
8 | (United States) J Isner | 6 | 6
(Colombia) S Giraldo | 1 | 3
(Spain) T Robredo | 3 | 7^{7} | 6
(Italy) A Seppi | 6 | 6^{4} | 2
(Russia) M Youzhny | 3 | 4
WC | (Serbia) V Troicki | 6 | 6
WC | (Spain) F López | 1 | 2
3 | (Czech Republic) T Berdych | 6 | 6
7 | (Latvia) E Gulbis | 6 | 6
(Italy) F Fognini | 3 | 4
Q | (Slovakia) M Kližan | 7^{7} | 6^{3} | 6
(Argentina) L Mayer | 6^{2} | 7^{7} | 4
(Croatia) I Karlović | 4 | 6 | 5
Q | (Germany) P Gojowczyk | 6 | 2 | 7
(France) R Gasquet | 4 | 0
2 | (Spain) R Nadal | 6 | 6

Second round
8 | (United States) J Isner | 3 | 7 | 7^{7}
(Spain) T Robredo | 6 | 5 | 6^{4}
WC | (Serbia) V Troicki | 3 | 4
3 | (Czech Republic) T Berdych | 6 | 6
7 | (Latvia) E Gulbis | 2 | 0^{r}
Q | (Slovakia) M Kližan | 6 | 3
Q | (Germany) P Gojowczyk | 3 | 4
2 | (Spain) R Nadal | 6 | 6

Quarterfinals
8 | (United States) J Isner | 1 | 4
3 | (Czech Republic) T Berdych | 6 | 6
Q | (Slovakia) M Kližan | 6^{7} | 6 | 6
2 | (Spain) R Nadal | 7^{9} | 4 | 3

Semifinals
3 | (Czech Republic) T Berdych | 6 | 6
Q | (Slovakia) M Kližan | 4 | 1

== Qualifying ==
=== Seeds ===
1. (Russia) Teymuraz Gabashvili (qualified)
2. (Slovakia) Martin Kližan (qualified)
3. (Italy) Simone Bolelli (qualifying competition)
4. (Tunisia) Malek Jaziri (qualifying competition)
5. (Kazakhstan) Mikhail Kukushkin (qualified)
6. (Australia) Matthew Ebden (first round)
7. (Serbia) Filip Krajinović (first round)
8. (Argentina) Máximo González (first round)

=== Qualifiers ===
1. (Russia) Teymuraz Gabashvili
2. (Slovakia) Martin Kližan
3. (Germany) Peter Gojowczyk
4. (Kazakhstan) Mikhail Kukushkin

=== Qualifying draw ===
==== First qualifier ====
First round
1 | (Russia) Teymuraz Gabashvili | 6 | 6
WC | (China) Wang Chuhan | 1 | 2
(Lithuania) Ričardas Berankis | 6 | 6
7 | (Serbia) Filip Krajinović | 4 | 2

Qualifying competition
1 | (Russia) Teymuraz Gabashvili | 7^{7} | 6
(Lithuania) Ričardas Berankis | 6^{3} | 2

==== Second qualifier ====
First round
2 | (Slovakia) Martin Kližan | 4 | 7^{9} | 6
WC | (China) Gao Xin | 6 | 6^{7} | 1
(India) Somdev Devvarman | 6^{6} | 7 | 6
6 | (Australia) Matthew Ebden | 7^{8} | 5 | 2

Qualifying competition
2 | (Slovakia) Martin Kližan | 6 | 6
(India) Somdev Devvarman | 2 | 1

==== Third qualifier ====
First round
3 | (Italy) Simone Bolelli | 6 | 6
WC | (Chinese Taipei) Yang Tsung-hua | 2 | 4
(Germany) Peter Gojowczyk | 6 | 7^{7}
8 | (Argentina) Máximo González | 4 | 6^{5}

Qualifying competition
3 | (Italy) Simone Bolelli | 3 | 4
(Germany) Peter Gojowczyk | 6 | 6

==== Fourth qualifier ====
First round
4 | (Tunisia) Malek Jaziri | 5 | 6 | 6
(Ukraine) Denys Molchanov | 7 | 2 | 4
(Russia) Evgeny Donskoy | 3 | 2
5 | (Kazakhstan) Mikhail Kukushkin | 6 | 6

Qualifying competition
4 | (Tunisia) Malek Jaziri | 2 | 1
5 | (Kazakhstan) Mikhail Kukushkin | 6 | 6
