= 2012 China Open – Men's singles =

Men's singles
- 2012 China Open

Final
- Champion: (Serbia) Novak Djokovic
- Runner-up: (France) Jo-Wilfried Tsonga
- Score: 7–6^{(7–4)}, 6–2

Events
| Singles | men | women |
| Doubles | men | women |
| ← 2011 · | China Open | · 2013 → |

Tomáš Berdych was the defending champion, but chose to compete in the 2012 Rakuten Japan Open Tennis Championships instead. Novak Djokovic beat Jo-Wilfried Tsonga 7–6^{(7–4)}, 6–2 in the final to win a third China Open title and improve to a 14–0 record.

== Seeds ==
1. (Serbia) Novak Djokovic (champion)
2. (Spain) David Ferrer (first round, retired because of a stomach virus)
3. (France) Jo-Wilfried Tsonga (final)
4. (Croatia) Marin Čilić (first round)
5. (France) Richard Gasquet (second round)
6. (Ukraine) Alexandr Dolgopolov (second round)
7. (Germany) Tommy Haas (first round)
8. (Spain) Fernando Verdasco (first round)

== Draw ==
=== Key ===
- Q = Qualifier
- WC = Wild card
- LL = Lucky loser
- Alt = Alternate
- SE = Special exempt
- PR = Protected ranking
- ITF = ITF entry
- JE = Junior exempt
- w/o = Walkover
- r = Retired
- d = Defaulted
- SR = Special ranking

=== Finals ===
Semifinals
1 | (Serbia) Novak Djokovic | 6 | 6
(Germany) Florian Mayer | 1 | 4
3 | (France) Jo-Wilfried Tsonga | 6 | 4
(Spain) Feliciano López | 1 | 1^{r}

Final
1 | (Serbia) Novak Djokovic | 7^{7} | 6
3 | (France) Jo-Wilfried Tsonga | 6^{4} | 2

=== Top half ===
First round
1 | (Serbia) N Djokovic | 6 | 6^{3} | 6
Q | (Germany) M Berrer | 1 | 7^{7} | 2
(Australia) M Matosevic | 6 | 2 | 3
(Argentina) C Berlocq | 3 | 6 | 6
(Austria) J Melzer | 6 | 4 | 7^{7}
(Spain) P Andújar | 1 | 6 | 6^{3}
(Spain) G García-López | 0 | 4
6 | (Ukraine) A Dolgopolov | 6 | 6
4 | (Croatia) M Čilić | 6 | 6^{0} | 4
WC | (Romania) M Copil | 3 | 7^{7} | 6
(Germany) F Mayer | 6 | 6
(Italy) F Fognini | 1 | 2
WC | (China) Z Zhang | 6 | 6
WC | (China) D Wu | 4 | 1
Q | (Australia) M Ebden | 2 | 4
5 | (France) R Gasquet | 6 | 6

Second round
1 | (Serbia) N Djokovic | 6 | 6
(Argentina) C Berlocq | 1 | 3
(Austria) J Melzer | 7^{11} | 2 | 6
6 | (Ukraine) A Dolgopolov | 6^{9} | 6 | 1
WC | (Romania) M Copil | 6 | 3 | 2
(Germany) F Mayer | 3 | 6 | 6
WC | (China) Z Zhang | 6 | 3 | 6
5 | (France) R Gasquet | 4 | 6 | 4

Quarterfinals
1 | (Serbia) N Djokovic | 6 | 6
(Austria) J Melzer | 1 | 2
(Germany) F Mayer | 6 | 6
WC | (China) Z Zhang | 3 | 4

Semifinals
1 | (Serbia) N Djokovic | 6 | 6
(Germany) F Mayer | 1 | 4

=== Bottom half ===
First round
7 | (Germany) T Haas | 4 | 6 | 2
(Russia) M Youzhny | 6 | 4 | 6
Q | (United States) B Baker | 7 | 3 | 1
(South Africa) K Anderson | 5 | 6 | 6
(Russia) N Davydenko | 7 | 6
Q | (Russia) A Bogomolov Jr. | 5 | 1
(Uzbekistan) D Istomin | 6 | 1 | 6^{3}
3 | (France) J-W Tsonga | 4 | 6 | 7^{7}
8 | (Spain) F Verdasco | 7 | 3 | 4
(United States) S Querrey | 5 | 6 | 6
(France) J Benneteau | 1 | 0^{r}
(Italy) A Seppi | 6 | 2
(United States) R Harrison | 6^{3} | 7 | 2
(Spain) F López | 7^{7} | 5 | 6
(Chinese Taipei) Y-h Lu | 5
2 | (Spain) D Ferrer | 4^{r}

Second round
(Russia) M Youzhny | 6 | 6
(South Africa) K Anderson | 3 | 3
(Russia) N Davydenko
3 | (France) J-W Tsonga | w/o
(United States) S Querrey | 6 | 6
(Italy) A Seppi | 1 | 4
(Spain) F López | 6 | 7^{9}
(Chinese Taipei) Y-h Lu | 3 | 6^{7}

Quarterfinals
(Russia) M Youzhny | 3 | 2
3 | (France) J-W Tsonga | 6 | 6
(United States) S Querrey | 6 | 4 | 4
(Spain) F López | 4 | 6 | 6

Semifinals
3 | (France) J-W Tsonga | 6 | 4
(Spain) F López | 1 | 1^{r}

== Qualifying ==
=== Seeds ===
1. (United States) Brian Baker (qualified)
2. (Australia) Matthew Ebden (qualified)
3. (Poland) Łukasz Kubot (first round)
4. (Slovenia) Grega Žemlja (qualifying competition)
5. (Russia) Alex Bogomolov Jr. (qualified)
6. (Germany) Michael Berrer (qualified)
7. (United States) Donald Young (qualifying competition)
8. (Chinese Taipei) Jimmy Wang (first round)

=== Qualifiers ===
1. (United States) Brian Baker
2. (Australia) Matthew Ebden
3. (Germany) Michael Berrer
4. (Russia) Alex Bogomolov Jr.

=== Draw ===
==== First qualifier ====
First round
1 | (United States) Brian Baker | 6 | 6
(Italy) Gianluca Naso | 4 | 4
(India) Yuki Bhambri | 3 | 2
7 | (United States) Donald Young | 6 | 6

Qualifying competition
1 | (United States) Brian Baker | 6 | 6
7 | (United States) Donald Young | 3 | 1

==== Second qualifier ====
First round
2 | (Australia) Matthew Ebden | 6 | 7^{7}
WC | (China) Chang Yu | 3 | 6^{5}
(Czech Republic) Jan Mertl | 6 | 6
8 | (Chinese Taipei) Jimmy Wang | 2 | 3

Qualifying competition
2 | (Australia) Matthew Ebden | 6 | 6
(Czech Republic) Jan Mertl | 2 | 4

==== Third qualifier ====
First round
3 | (Poland) Łukasz Kubot | 2 | 4
(Turkey) Marsel İlhan | 6 | 6
WC | (Chinese Taipei) Yang Tsung-hua | 2 | 3
6 | (Germany) Michael Berrer | 6 | 6

Qualifying competition
(Turkey) Marsel İlhan | 3 | 0
6 | (Germany) Michael Berrer | 6 | 6

==== Fourth qualifier ====
First round
4 | (Slovenia) Grega Žemlja | 6 | 3 | 7^{7}
(Czech Republic) Jan Hernych | 4 | 6 | 6^{5}
WC | (China) Wang Chuhan | 0 | 2
5 | (Russia) Alex Bogomolov Jr. | 6 | 6

Qualifying competition
4 | (Slovenia) Grega Žemlja | 3 | 4
5 | (Russia) Alex Bogomolov Jr. | 6 | 6
