= 2012 China Open (tennis) =

Coordinates: 40.0200°N 116.3700°E

- Date: 1–7 October
- Edition: 14th (ATP) / 16th (WTA)
- Category: ATP World Tour 500 (men); Premier Mandatory (women)
- Surface: Hard / outdoor
- Location: Beijing, China

Champions

Men's singles
- (Serbia) Novak Djokovic

Women's singles
- (Belarus) Victoria Azarenka

Men's doubles
- (United States) Bob Bryan / (United States) Mike Bryan

Women's doubles
- (Russia) Ekaterina Makarova / (Russia) Elena Vesnina
← 2011 ·	China Open	· 2013 →

The 2012 China Open was a tennis tournament played on outdoor hard courts. It was the 14th edition of the China Open for the men (16th for the women), and part of the ATP 500 Series of the 2012 ATP World Tour, and of the Premier Series of the 2012 WTA Tour. Both the men's and the women's events were held at the Olympic Green Tennis Center in Beijing, China, from 1 October till 7 October 2012. Novak Djokovic and Victoria Azarenka won the singles titles.

== Finals ==
=== Men's singles ===
- (Serbia) Novak Djokovic defeated (France) Jo-Wilfried Tsonga, 7–6^{(7–4)}, 6–2

=== Women's singles ===
- (Belarus) Victoria Azarenka defeated (Russia) Maria Sharapova, 6–3, 6–1

=== Men's doubles ===
- (United States) Bob Bryan / (United States) Mike Bryan defeated (Argentina) Carlos Berlocq / (Uzbekistan) Denis Istomin, 6–3, 6–2

=== Women's doubles ===
- (Russia) Ekaterina Makarova / (Russia) Elena Vesnina defeated (Spain) Nuria Llagostera Vives / (India) Sania Mirza, 7–5, 7–5

== Points and prize money ==
=== Point distribution ===
Stage	Men's singles	Men's doubles	Women's singles	Women's doubles
Champion	500		1000	
Runner up	300		700	
Semifinals	180		450	
Quarterfinals	90		250	
Round of 16	45	0	140	
Round of 32	0	–	80	5
Round of 64	-	–	5	–
Qualifier	20	–	30	–
Qualifying Finalist	10	–	20	–
Qualifying 1st round	0	–	1	–

=== Prize money ===
Stage	Men's singles	Men's doubles	Women's singles	Women's doubles
Champion	$505,000	$148,500	$775,500	$266,000
Runner up	$234,000	$68,000	$387,750	$133,000
Semifinals	$110,000	$33,000	$169,447	$53,000
Quarterfinals	$52,520	$15,500	$74,450	$22,260
Round of 16	$26,810	$7,920	$37,225	$9,350
Round of 32	$14,710	–	$19,950	$4,250
Round of 64	-	–	$11,817	–
Final round qualifying	$1,700	–	$2,610	–
First round qualifying	$900	–	$1,350	–

== ATP singles main-draw entrants ==
=== Seeds ===
Country	Player	Rank^{1}	Seed
SRB	Novak Djokovic	2	1
ESP	David Ferrer	5	2
FRA	Jo-Wilfried Tsonga	7	3
CRO	Marin Čilić	13	4
FRA	Richard Gasquet	14	5
UKR	Alexandr Dolgopolov	20	6
GER	Tommy Haas	21	7
ESP	Fernando Verdasco	23	8

- ^{1} Rankings are as of September 24, 2012

=== Other entrants ===
The following players received wildcards into the singles main draw:

- (Romania) Marius Copil
- (China) Wu Di
- (China) Ze Zhang

The following players received entry from the qualifying draw:

- (United States) Brian Baker
- (Germany) Michael Berrer
- (Russia) Alex Bogomolov Jr.
- (Australia) Matthew Ebden

=== Withdrawals ===
- (Colombia) Santiago Giraldo
- (Spain) Marcel Granollers
- (United States) John Isner
- (Spain) Rafael Nadal

=== Retirements ===
- (France) Julien Benneteau
- (Russia) Nikolay Davydenko
- (Spain) David Ferrer (stomach virus)
- (Spain) Feliciano López

== ATP doubles main-draw entrants ==
=== Seeds ===
Country	Player	Country	Player	Rank^{1}	Seed
USA	Bob Bryan	USA	Mike Bryan	2	1
BLR	Max Mirnyi	CAN	Daniel Nestor	6	2
SWE	Robert Lindstedt	ROU	Horia Tecău	12	3
POL	Mariusz Fyrstenberg	POL	Marcin Matkowski	21	4

- Rankings are as of September 24, 2012

=== Other entrants ===
The following pairs received wildcards into the doubles main draw:

- (China) Yu Chang / (China) Zhe Li
- (China) Maoxin Gong / (China) Zhang Ze

The following pair received entry as alternates:

- (Argentina) Carlos Berlocq / (Uzbekistan) Denis Istomin

=== Withdrawals ===
- (France) Julien Benneteau
- (Croatia) Marin Čilić (right hip injury)

== WTA singles main-draw entrants ==
=== Seeds ===
Country	Player	Rank^{1}	Seed
BLR	Victoria Azarenka	1	1
RUS	Maria Sharapova	2	2
POL	Agnieszka Radwańska	3	3
CZE	Petra Kvitová	5	4
GER	Angelique Kerber	6	5
ITA	Sara Errani	7	6
CHN	Li Na	8	7
AUS	Samantha Stosur	9	8
FRA	Marion Bartoli	10	9
DNK	Caroline Wozniacki	11	10
SRB	Ana Ivanovic	12	11
SVK	Dominika Cibulková	13	12
RUS	Maria Kirilenko	14	13
EST	Kaia Kanepi	15	14
ITA	Roberta Vinci	16	15
CZE	Lucie Šafářová	17	16

- ^{1} Rankings are as of September 24, 2012

=== Other entrants ===
The following players received wildcards into the singles main draw:

- (Japan) Kimiko Date-Krumm
- (Spain) María-Teresa Torró-Flor
- (China) Wang Qiang
- (China) Zheng Saisai
- (China) Zhang Shuai

The following players received entry from the qualifying draw:

- (Spain) Lara Arruabarrena Vecino
- (Spain) Lourdes Domínguez Lino
- (Italy) Camila Giorgi
- (Slovenia) Polona Hercog
- (Serbia) Bojana Jovanovski
- (Japan) Ayumi Morita
- (United Kingdom) Laura Robson
- (Russia) Elena Vesnina

The following player received entry as lucky loser:

- (Belarus) Olga Govortsova

=== Withdrawals ===
- (Estonia) Kaia Kanepi (right heel injury)
- (Italy) Flavia Pennetta (right wrist injury)
- (United States) Sloane Stephens
- (United States) Serena Williams (illness)
- (United States) Venus Williams (back injury)
- (Russia) Vera Zvonareva (illness)

=== Retirements ===
- (Slovakia) Dominika Cibulková (left hip injury)
- (Italy) Sara Errani (left thigh injury)
- (Germany) Angelique Kerber (right foot injury)
- (Russia) Anastasia Pavlyuchenkova (gastrointestinal illness)

== WTA doubles main-draw entrants ==
=== Seeds ===
Country	Player	Country	Player	Rank^{1}	Seed
ITA	Sara Errani	ITA	Roberta Vinci	3	1
RUS	Maria Kirilenko	RUS	Nadia Petrova	17	2
RUS	Ekaterina Makarova	RUS	Elena Vesnina	26	3
USA	Vania King	KAZ	Yaroslava Shvedova	28	4
ESP	Nuria Llagostera Vives	IND	Sania Mirza	30	5
SLO	Katarina Srebotnik	CHN	Zheng Jie	31	6
GER	Anna-Lena Grönefeld	CZE	Květa Peschke	41	7
USA	Raquel Kops-Jones	USA	Abigail Spears	41	8

- ^{1} Rankings are as of September 24, 2012

=== Other entrants ===
The following pairs received wildcards into the doubles main draw:

- (China) Tang Haochen / (China) Tian Ran
- (Serbia) Jelena Janković / (Germany) Andrea Petkovic
- (China) Yan Zi / (China) Zheng Saisai

The following pairs received entry as alternates:

- (Colombia) Catalina Castaño / (France) Virginie Razzano
- (China) Liu Wanting / (China) Sun Shengnan

=== Withdrawals ===
- (Italy) Sara Errani (left thigh injury)
- (Russia) Anastasia Pavlyuchenkova (gastrointestinal illness)
