= 2013 China Open – Women's singles =

Women's singles
- 2013 China Open

Final
- Champion: (United States) Serena Williams
- Runner-up: (Serbia) Jelena Janković
- Score: 6–2, 6–2

Details
- Draw: 56
- Seeds: 16

Events
Singles	men	women
Doubles	men	women
- China Open

Serena Williams defeated Jelena Janković in the final, 6–2, 6–2 to win the women's singles tennis title at the 2013 China Open.

Victoria Azarenka was the defending champion, but lost to Andrea Petkovic in the first round.

== Seeds ==
1. (United States) Serena Williams (champion)
2. (Belarus) Victoria Azarenka (first round)
3. (Poland) Agnieszka Radwańska (semifinals)
4. (China) Li Na (quarterfinals)
5. (Italy) Sara Errani (third round)
6. (Denmark) Caroline Wozniacki (quarterfinals)
7. (Germany) Angelique Kerber (quarterfinals)
8. (Serbia) Jelena Janković (final)
9. (Czech Republic) Petra Kvitová (semifinals)
10. (Italy) Roberta Vinci (third round)
11. (United States) Sloane Stephens (third round)
12. (Spain) Carla Suárez Navarro (third round)
13. (Germany) Sabine Lisicki (third round)
14. (Serbia) Ana Ivanovic (second round)
15. (Australia) Samantha Stosur (first round)
16. (Romania) Simona Halep (first round)

Click on the seed number of a player to go to their draw section.

The four Tokyo semifinalists received a bye into the second round. They were as follows:

- (Germany) Angelique Kerber
- (Czech Republic) Petra Kvitová
- (United States) Venus Williams
- (Denmark) Caroline Wozniacki

== Draw ==
Key

- Q = Qualifier
- WC = Wild card
- LL = Lucky loser
- Alt = Alternate
- ITF = ITF entry
- PR = Protected ranking
- SR = Special ranking
- SE = Special exempt
- JE = Junior exempt
- JR = Junior Accelerator Programme entrant
- CO = College Accelerator Programme entrant
- NG = Next Gen Accelerator Program entrant
- w/o = Walkover
- r = Retired
- d = Defaulted

=== Finals ===
Quarterfinals
1	(United States) Serena Williams	6	6
6	(Denmark) Caroline Wozniacki	1	4
3	(Poland) Agnieszka Radwańska	7^{9}	6
7	(Germany) Angelique Kerber	6^{7}	4
9	(Czech Republic) Petra Kvitová	4	6	6
4	(China) Li Na	6	2	4
8	(Serbia) Jelena Janković	6^{3}	6	6
(Czech Republic) Lucie Šafářová	7^{7}	4	4

Semifinals
1	(United States) Serena Williams	6	6
3	(Poland) Agnieszka Radwańska	2	2
9	(Czech Republic) Petra Kvitová	7^{9}	1	1
8	(Serbia) Jelena Janković	6^{7}	6	6

Final
1	(United States) Serena Williams	6	6
8	(Serbia) Jelena Janković	2	2

=== Top half ===
==== Section 1 ====
First round
1	(United States) S Williams	6	6
(Russia) E Vesnina	4	2
WC	(Italy) F Schiavone	3
(France) A Cornet	2^{r}
(Russia) M Kirilenko	7	6
WC	(China) J Zheng	5	2
(Poland) U Radwańska	7^{7}	7^{7}
16	(Romania) S Halep	6^{4}	6^{2}
11	(United States) S Stephens	6	6
PR	(Canada) A Wozniak	4	4
Q	(Canada) E Bouchard	6	6
(Slovakia) M Rybáriková	4	1
(Germany) A Beck	6^{4}	4
(Romania) M Niculescu	7^{7}	6

Second round
1	(United States) S Williams	6	7
WC	(Italy) F Schiavone	4	5
(Russia) M Kirilenko	6	6
(Poland) U Radwańska	4	4
11	(United States) S Stephens	6	1	6
Q	(Canada) E Bouchard	1	6	4
(Romania) M Niculescu	3	1
6	(Denmark) C Wozniacki	6	6

Third round
1	(United States) S Williams	7	7
(Russia) M Kirilenko	5	5
11	(United States) S Stephens	3	1
6	(Denmark) C Wozniacki	6	6

Quarterfinals
1	(United States) S Williams	6	6
6	(Denmark) C Wozniacki	1	4

==== Section 2 ====
First round
3	(Poland) A Radwańska	4	6	6
(Switzerland) S Vögele	6	4	4
(United States) M Keys	6	6
(Slovakia) D Cibulková	4	3
Q	(Slovenia) P Hercog	6	6
(Puerto Rico) M Puig	1	4
PR	(Italy) F Pennetta	6^{9}	1
14	(Serbia) A Ivanovic	7^{11}	6
10	(Italy) R Vinci	6	6
(Ukraine) E Svitolina	2	2
WC	(China) S Zhang	6	6
(China) S Peng	3	3
(Czech Republic) K Zakopalová	6^{3}	6	1
(United Kingdom) L Robson	7^{7}	4	6

Second round
3	(Poland) A Radwańska	6	6
(United States) M Keys	3	2
Q	(Slovenia) P Hercog	6	6
14	(Serbia) A Ivanovic	4	4
10	(Italy) R Vinci	3	6	6
WC	(China) S Zhang	6	3	1
(United Kingdom) L Robson	1	2
7	(Germany) A Kerber	6	6

Third round
3	(Poland) A Radwańska	6	6
Q	(Slovenia) P Hercog	0	2
10	(Italy) R Vinci	2	4
7	(Germany) A Kerber	6	6

Quarterfinals
3	(Poland) A Radwańska	7^{9}	6
7	(Germany) A Kerber	6^{7}	4

=== Bottom half ===
==== Section 3 ====
First round
5	(Italy) S Errani	7^{7}	6
(Belgium) K Flipkens	6^{3}	1
Q	(Japan) M Doi	6	6
Q	(Spain) S Soler Espinosa	1	1
(United States) V Lepchenko	1	6	6
WC	(United Kingdom) H Watson	6	3	3
13	(Germany) S Lisicki	6	6
Q	(South Africa) C Scheepers	3	2
(Serbia) B Jovanovski	6	6
(Romania) S Cîrstea	3	2
(Slovakia) D Hantuchová	0	4
4	(China) N Li	6	6

Second round
5	(Italy) S Errani	6	6
Q	(Japan) M Doi	3	2
(United States) V Lepchenko	6	2	0
9	(Czech Republic) P Kvitová	2	6	6
13	(Germany) S Lisicki	6	6
WC	(United States) V Williams	1	2
(Serbia) B Jovanovski	0	1
4	(China) N Li	6	6

Third round
5	(Italy) S Errani	4	7^{7}	3
9	(Czech Republic) P Kvitová	6	6^{3}	6
13	(Germany) S Lisicki	5	4
4	(China) N Li	7	6

Quarterfinals
9	(Czech Republic) P Kvitová	4	6	6
4	(China) N Li	6	2	4

==== Section 4 ====
First round
8	(Serbia) J Janković	1	6	6
(Russia) A Pavlyuchenkova	6	4	0
Q	(Canada) S Fichman	4	3
Q	(Kazakhstan) G Voskoboeva	6	6
(Germany) M Barthel	0	7	4
Q	(United States) L Davis	6	5	6
(France) K Mladenovic	2	6	5
12	(Spain) C Suárez Navarro	6	3	7
15	(Australia) S Stosur	5	3
(Czech Republic) L Šafářová	7	6
(Estonia) K Kanepi	7	6
(Germany) J Görges	5	4
(Chinese Taipei) S-w Hsieh	1	1
(Russia) S Kuznetsova	6	6
(Germany) A Petkovic	6	2	6
2	(Belarus) V Azarenka	4	6	4

Second round
8	(Serbia) J Janković	6	5	6
Q	(Kazakhstan) G Voskoboeva	3	7	3
Q	(United States) L Davis	4	2
12	(Spain) C Suárez Navarro	6	6
(Czech Republic) L Šafářová	6	6
(Estonia) K Kanepi	3	3
(Russia) S Kuznetsova	6	4	1
(Germany) A Petkovic	4	6	6

Third round
8	(Serbia) J Janković	6	6
12	(Spain) C Suárez Navarro	0	0
(Czech Republic) L Šafářová	6	6^{4}	7^{7}
(Germany) A Petkovic	4	7^{7}	6^{2}

Quarterfinals
8	(Serbia) J Janković	6^{3}	6	6
(Czech Republic) L Šafářová	7^{7}	4	4

== Qualifying ==
=== Seeds ===
1. (Canada) Eugenie Bouchard (qualified)
2. (New Zealand) Marina Erakovic (qualifying competition)
3. (Japan) Kimiko Date-Krumm (qualifying competition)
4. (Spain) Lourdes Domínguez Lino (qualifying competition)
5. (Argentina) Paula Ormaechea (first round)
6. (Ukraine) Lesia Tsurenko (qualifying competition)
7. (Czech Republic) Karolína Plíšková (qualifying competition)
8. (France) Caroline Garcia (first round)
9. (Spain) María Teresa Torró Flor (first round)
10. (Kazakhstan) Yaroslava Shvedova (qualifying competition)
11. (Kazakhstan) Galina Voskoboeva (qualified)
12. (South Africa) Chanelle Scheepers (qualified)
13. (Slovenia) Polona Hercog (qualified)
14. (United States) Lauren Davis (qualified)
15. (Sweden) Johanna Larsson (first round)
16. (Israel) Shahar Pe'er (first round)

=== Qualifiers ===
1. (Canada) Eugenie Bouchard
2. (Kazakhstan) Galina Voskoboeva
3. (Japan) Misaki Doi
4. (Slovenia) Polona Hercog
5. (Canada) Sharon Fichman
6. (South Africa) Chanelle Scheepers
7. (United States) Lauren Davis
8. (Spain) Sílvia Soler Espinosa

=== Draw ===
==== First qualifier ====
First round
1	(Canada) Eugenie Bouchard	6	6
WC	(China) Zheng Saisai	2	3
(Slovakia) Anna Schmiedlová	6	6
15	(Sweden) Johanna Larsson	4	3

Qualifying competition
1	(Canada) Eugenie Bouchard	4	6	6
(Slovakia) Anna Schmiedlová	6	0	3

==== Second qualifier ====
First round
2	(New Zealand) Marina Erakovic	6	6^{4}	6
(Serbia) Vesna Dolonc	1	7^{7}	2
(Czech Republic) Petra Cetkovská	2	6	2
11	(Kazakhstan) Galina Voskoboeva	6	2	6

Qualifying competition
2	(New Zealand) Marina Erakovic	2	2
11	(Kazakhstan) Galina Voskoboeva	6	6

==== Third qualifier ====
First round
3	(Japan) Kimiko Date-Krumm	6	6
(Israel) Julia Glushko	2	1
(Japan) Misaki Doi	3	6	6
16	(Israel) Shahar Pe'er	6	3	0

Qualifying competition
3	(Japan) Kimiko Date-Krumm	6^{5}	2^{r}
(Japan) Misaki Doi	7^{7}	4

==== Fourth qualifier ====
First round
4	(Spain) Lourdes Domínguez Lino	6^{5}	6	6
WC	(China) Duan Yingying	7^{7}	4	3
WC	(China) Wang Qiang	4	3
13	(Slovenia) Polona Hercog	6	6

Qualifying competition
4	(Spain) Lourdes Domínguez Lino	4	3
13	(Slovenia) Polona Hercog	6	6

==== Fifth qualifier ====
First round
5	(Argentina) Paula Ormaechea	4	7	3
(Canada) Sharon Fichman	6	5	6
(Spain) Anabel Medina Garrigues	2	6^{9}
10	(Kazakhstan) Yaroslava Shvedova	6	7^{11}

Qualifying competition
(Canada) Sharon Fichman	4	7^{7}	6
10	(Kazakhstan) Yaroslava Shvedova	6	6^{5}	4

==== Sixth qualifier ====
First round
6	(Ukraine) Lesia Tsurenko	6	6
(Bulgaria) Tsvetana Pironkova	4	4
(Croatia) Petra Martić	3	3
12	(South Africa) Chanelle Scheepers	6	6

Qualifying competition
6	(Ukraine) Lesia Tsurenko	4	4
12	(South Africa) Chanelle Scheepers	6	6

==== Seventh qualifier ====
First round
7	(Czech Republic) Karolína Plíšková	6	7
(Japan) Kurumi Nara	4	5
WC	(China) Zhang Yuxuan	7	3	3
14	(United States) Lauren Davis	5	6	6

Qualifying competition
7	(Czech Republic) Karolína Plíšková	5	6^{3}
14	(United States) Lauren Davis	7	7^{7}

==== Eighth qualifier ====
First round
8	(France) Caroline Garcia	1	1
(France) Virginie Razzano	6	6
(Spain) Sílvia Soler Espinosa	6	6
9	(Spain) María Teresa Torró Flor	1	1

Qualifying competition
(France) Virginie Razzano	6	5	0^{r}
(Spain) Sílvia Soler Espinosa	2	7	0
