= 2012 China Open – Men's doubles =

Men's doubles
- 2012 China Open

Final
- Champions: (United States) Bob Bryan (United States) Mike Bryan
- Runners-up: (Argentina) Carlos Berlocq (Uzbekistan) Denis Istomin
- Score: 6–3, 6–2

Events
Singles	men	women
Doubles	men	women
← 2011 ·	China Open	· 2013 →

Michaël Llodra and Nenad Zimonjić were the defending champions but decided not to participate.
Bob and Mike Bryan won the title, defeating Carlos Berlocq and Denis Istomin 6–3, 6–2 in the final.

== Seeds ==
1. (United States) Bob Bryan / (United States) Mike Bryan (champions)
2. (Belarus) Max Mirnyi / (Canada) Daniel Nestor (first round)
3. (Sweden) Robert Lindstedt / (Romania) Horia Tecău (quarterfinals)
4. (Poland) Mariusz Fyrstenberg / (Poland) Marcin Matkowski (first round)

== Draw ==
=== Key ===
- Q = Qualifier
- WC = Wild card
- LL = Lucky loser
- Alt = Alternate
- SE = Special exempt
- PR = Protected ranking
- ITF = ITF entry
- JE = Junior exempt
- w/o = Walkover
- r = Retired
- d = Defaulted
- SR = Special ranking

=== Draw ===
First round
1	(United States) B Bryan (United States) M Bryan	6	7^{7}
(Spain) P Andújar (Spain) F López	1	6^{5}
(Germany) F Mayer (Italy) A Seppi	7^{10}	3	[9]
(Ukraine) A Dolgopolov (Poland) Ł Kubot	6^{8}	6	[11]
4	(Poland) M Fyrstenberg (Poland) M Matkowski	3	4
(Germany) T Haas (Austria) J Melzer	6	6
(Croatia) M Čilić (Australia) M Matosevic	6^{2}	6	[10]
(South Africa) K Anderson (United States) S Querrey	7^{7}	1	[4]
WC	(China) Y Chang (China) Z Li	3	2
(United Kingdom) C Fleming (United Kingdom) R Hutchins	6	6
(Spain) D Marrero (Spain) F Verdasco	6^{3}	3
3	(Sweden) R Lindstedt (Romania) H Tecău	7^{7}	6
WC	(China) M Gong (China) Z Zhang	3	0
(India) M Bhupathi (India) R Bopanna	6	6
Alt	(Argentina) C Berlocq (Uzbekistan) D Istomin	1	6	[12]
2	(Belarus) M Mirnyi (Canada) D Nestor	6	3	[10]

Quarterfinals
1	(United States) B Bryan (United States) M Bryan	7^{7}	6
(Ukraine) A Dolgopolov (Poland) Ł Kubot	6^{4}	2
(Germany) T Haas (Austria) J Melzer	6	3	[10]
(Croatia) M Čilić (Australia) M Matosevic	2	6	[12]
(United Kingdom) C Fleming (United Kingdom) R Hutchins	6^{3}	6	[10]
3	(Sweden) R Lindstedt (Romania) H Tecău	7^{7}	2	[5]
(India) M Bhupathi (India) R Bopanna	2	6^{6}
Alt	(Argentina) C Berlocq (Uzbekistan) D Istomin	6	7^{8}

Semifinals
1	(United States) B Bryan (United States) M Bryan	w/o
(Croatia) M Čilić (Australia) M Matosevic
(United Kingdom) C Fleming (United Kingdom) R Hutchins	2	3
Alt	(Argentina) C Berlocq (Uzbekistan) D Istomin	6	6

Final
1	(United States) B Bryan (United States) M Bryan	6	6
Alt	(Argentina) C Berlocq (Uzbekistan) D Istomin	3	2
