= 2013 China Open – Women's doubles =

Women's doubles
- 2013 China Open

Final
- Champions: (Zimbabwe) Cara Black (India) Sania Mirza
- Runners-up: (Russia) Vera Dushevina (Spain) Arantxa Parra Santonja
- Score: 6–2, 6–2

Events
Singles	men	women
Doubles	men	women
← 2012 ·	China Open	· 2014 →

Ekaterina Makarova and Elena Vesnina were the defending champions, but Makarova withdrew due to injury. Vesnina was scheduled to partner with Marina Erakovic, but Erakovic withdrew before the first round for personal reasons.
Cara Black and Sania Mirza won the title, defeating Vera Dushevina and Arantxa Parra Santonja in the final, 6–2, 6–2.

== Seeds ==
1. (Italy) Sara Errani / (Italy) Roberta Vinci (semifinals)
2. (Chinese Taipei) Hsieh Su-wei / (China) Peng Shuai (semifinals)
3. (Australia) Ashleigh Barty / (Australia) Casey Dellacqua (second round)
4. (Serbia) Jelena Janković / (Slovenia) Katarina Srebotnik (second round)
5. (Germany) Anna-Lena Grönefeld / (Czech Republic) Květa Peschke (first round)
6. (United States) Raquel Kops-Jones / (United States) Abigail Spears (quarterfinals)
7. (New Zealand) Marina Erakovic / (Russia) Elena Vesnina (withdrew)
8. (Zimbabwe) Cara Black / (India) Sania Mirza (champions)

== Draw ==
=== Key ===
- Q = Qualifier
- WC = Wild card
- LL = Lucky loser
- Alt = Alternate
- SE = Special exempt
- PR = Protected ranking
- ITF = ITF entry
- JE = Junior exempt
- w/o = Walkover
- r = Retired
- d = Defaulted
- SR = Special ranking

=== Finals ===
Semifinals
1	(Italy) Sara Errani (Italy) Roberta Vinci	4	4
8	(Zimbabwe) Cara Black (India) Sania Mirza	6	6
(Russia) Vera Dushevina (Spain) Arantxa Parra Santonja	3	6	[10]
2	(Chinese Taipei) Hsieh Su-wei (China) Peng Shuai	6	1	[8]

Final
8	(Zimbabwe) Cara Black (India) Sania Mirza	6	6
(Russia) Vera Dushevina (Spain) Arantxa Parra Santonja	2	2

=== Top half ===
First round
WC	(United States) S Williams (United States) V Williams	7^{7}	4	[9]
(Chinese Taipei) H-c Chan (United States) L Huber	6^{3}	6	[11]
(Croatia) D Jurak (Luxembourg) M Minella	2	2
(France) K Mladenovic (Italy) F Pennetta	6	6
WC	(China) Z Sun (China) Y Zhang	6^{4}	0
Alt	(Spain) S Soler Espinosa (Spain) C Suárez Navarro	7^{7}	6
WC	(Kazakhstan) Y Shvedova (China) S Zhang	3	6	[5]
(Chinese Taipei) Y-j Chan (China) J Zheng	6	3	[10]
(United States) V Lepchenko (China) S Zheng	7	0	[6]
(Russia) A Pavlyuchenkova (Czech Republic) L Šafářová	5	6	[10]
(Japan) K Date-Krumm (South Africa) C Scheepers	3	3
8	(Zimbabwe) C Black (India) S Mirza	6	6

Second round
1	(Italy) S Errani (Italy) R Vinci	6	6^{4}	[10]
(Chinese Taipei) H-c Chan (United States) L Huber	4	7^{7}	[8]
(France) K Mladenovic (Italy) F Pennetta	6	6
Alt	(Spain) S Soler Espinosa (Spain) C Suárez Navarro	3	1
3	(Australia) A Barty (Australia) C Dellacqua	4	4
(Chinese Taipei) Y-j Chan (China) J Zheng	6	6
(Russia) A Pavlyuchenkova (Czech Republic) L Šafářová	3	2
8	(Zimbabwe) C Black (India) S Mirza	6	6

Quarterfinals
1	(Italy) S Errani (Italy) R Vinci	6	6
(France) K Mladenovic (Italy) F Pennetta	3	4
(Chinese Taipei) Y-j Chan (China) J Zheng	4	1
8	(Zimbabwe) C Black (India) S Mirza	6	6

Semifinals
1	(Italy) S Errani (Italy) R Vinci	4	4
8	(Zimbabwe) C Black (India) S Mirza	6	6

=== Bottom half ===
First round
5	(Germany) A-L Grönefeld (Czech Republic) K Peschke	4	6	[3]
(Germany) S Lisicki (Spain) A Medina Garrigues	6	1	[10]
(Slovakia) D Hantuchová (United States) L Raymond	7	6
(Russia) A Kudryavtseva (Australia) A Rodionova	5	3
(Slovakia) J Husárová (Georgia (country)) O Kalashnikova	2	3
(Russia) V Dushevina (Spain) A Parra Santonja	6	6
6	(United States) R Kops-Jones (United States) A Spears	6	6
(Belarus) O Govortsova (Poland) A Rosolska	1	1
WC	(Russia) S Kuznetsova (Australia) S Stosur	6^{5}	3
(United States) V King (Kazakhstan) G Voskoboeva	7^{7}	6
(Japan) S Aoyama (United States) M Moulton-Levy	5	6	[8]
(Germany) J Görges (Czech Republic) B Záhlavová-Strýcová	7	4	[10]

Second round
(Germany) S Lisicki (Spain) A Medina Garrigues	3	4
(Slovakia) D Hantuchová (United States) L Raymond	6	6
(Russia) V Dushevina (Spain) A Parra Santonja	6	6^{4}	[10]
4	(Serbia) J Janković (Slovenia) K Srebotnik	4	7^{7}	[6]
6	(United States) R Kops-Jones (United States) A Spears	6	6
(United States) V King (Kazakhstan) G Voskoboeva	3	2
(Germany) J Görges (Czech Republic) B Záhlavová-Strýcová	3	4
2	(Chinese Taipei) S-w Hsieh (China) S Peng	6	6

Quarterfinals
(Slovakia) D Hantuchová (United States) L Raymond	4	5
(Russia) V Dushevina (Spain) A Parra Santonja	6	7
6	(United States) R Kops-Jones (United States) A Spears	2	6^{4}
2	(Chinese Taipei) S-w Hsieh (China) S Peng	6	7

Semifinals
(Russia) V Dushevina (Spain) A Parra Santonja	3	6	[10]
2	(Chinese Taipei) S-w Hsieh (China) S Peng	6	1	[8]
