= 2012 China Open – Women's singles =

Women's singles
- 2012 China Open

Final
- Champion: (Belarus) Victoria Azarenka
- Runner-up: (Russia) Maria Sharapova
- Score: 6–3, 6–1

Details
- Seeds: 16

Events
Singles	men	women
Doubles	men	women
- China Open

Victoria Azarenka defeated Maria Sharapova in the final, 6–3, 6–1 to win the women's singles tennis title at the 2012 China Open.

Agnieszka Radwańska was the defending champion, but lost to Li Na in the quarterfinals.

== Seeds ==
1. (Belarus) Victoria Azarenka (champion)
2. (Russia) Maria Sharapova (final)
3. (Poland) Agnieszka Radwańska (quarterfinals)
4. (Czech Republic) Petra Kvitová (second round)
5. (Germany) Angelique Kerber (quarterfinals, retired due to right foot injury)
6. (Italy) Sara Errani (first round, retired due to left thigh injury)
7. (China) Li Na (semifinals)
8. (Australia) Samantha Stosur (second round)
9. (France) Marion Bartoli (semifinals)
10. (Denmark) Caroline Wozniacki (third round)
11. (Serbia) Ana Ivanovic (third round)
12. (Slovakia) Dominika Cibulková (first round, retired due to left hip injury)
13. (Russia) Maria Kirilenko (first round)
14. (Estonia) Kaia Kanepi (withdrew because of a right heel injury)
15. (Italy) Roberta Vinci (first round)
16. (Czech Republic) Lucie Šafářová (first round)

The four Tokyo semifinalists received a bye into the second round. They are as follows:

- (Germany) Angelique Kerber
- (Russia) Nadia Petrova
- (Poland) Agnieszka Radwańska
- (Australia) Samantha Stosur

== Draw ==
=== Finals ===
Quarterfinals
1	(Belarus) Victoria Azarenka	6	6
(Switzerland) Romina Oprandi	2	0
(Spain) Carla Suárez Navarro	0	6	4
9	(France) Marion Bartoli	6	2	6
7	(China) Li Na	6	6
3	(Poland) Agnieszka Radwańska	4	2
5	(Germany) Angelique Kerber	0	0^{r}
2	(Russia) Maria Sharapova	6	3

Semifinals
1	(Belarus) Victoria Azarenka	6	6
9	(France) Marion Bartoli	4	2
7	(China) Li Na	4	0
2	(Russia) Maria Sharapova	6	6

Final
1	(Belarus) Victoria Azarenka	6	6
2	(Russia) Maria Sharapova	3	1

=== Top half ===
==== Section 1 ====
First round
1	(Belarus) V Azarenka	6	6
(France) A Cornet	1	0
(Germany) S Lisicki	6	5	6
(Spain) A Medina Garrigues	3	7	2
(Germany) M Barthel	1	1
Q	(Russia) E Vesnina	6	6
(Austria) T Paszek	7	0	7^{8}
LL	(Belarus) O Govortsova	5	6	6^{6}
11	(Serbia) A Ivanovic	6	6
(United States) C McHale	3	2
(United States) V Lepchenko	7	6
(Bulgaria) T Pironkova	5	4
(Switzerland) R Oprandi	7	6
(Poland) U Radwańska	5	2
Q	(Italy) C Giorgi	5
6	(Italy) S Errani	4^{r}

Second round
1	(Belarus) V Azarenka	6	6
(Germany) S Lisicki	4	2
Q	(Russia) E Vesnina	7^{7}	6
(Austria) T Paszek	6^{5}	2
11	(Serbia) A Ivanovic	4	7	6
(United States) V Lepchenko	6	5	1
(Switzerland) R Oprandi	7	6
Q	(Italy) C Giorgi	5	2

Third round
1	(Belarus) V Azarenka	6	6
Q	(Russia) E Vesnina	3	3
11	(Serbia) A Ivanovic	4	3
(Switzerland) R Oprandi	6	6

Quarterfinals
1	(Belarus) V Azarenka	6	6
(Switzerland) R Oprandi	2	0

==== Section 2 ====
First round
4	(Czech Republic) P Kvitová	6	6
(Slovakia) D Hantuchová	2	3
(Spain) C Suárez Navarro	6	6
PR	(Switzerland) T Bacsinszky	4	1
(Serbia) J Janković	6	6
(Germany) A Petkovic	2	4
(Romania) M Niculescu	6	6
16	(Czech Republic) L Šafářová	2	0
9	(France) M Bartoli	6	6
Q	(Serbia) B Jovanovski	3	3
Q	(Japan) A Morita	6	6
WC	(Spain) M-T Torró-Flor	3	0
(United States) V King	7^{11}	5	2
(Germany) J Görges	6^{9}	7	6

Second round
4	(Czech Republic) P Kvitová	3	2
(Spain) C Suárez Navarro	6	6
(Serbia) J Janković	6	6
(Romania) M Niculescu	2	1
9	(France) M Bartoli	6	6
Q	(Japan) A Morita	4	3
(Germany) J Görges	7^{7}	4	7
8	(Australia) S Stosur	6^{2}	6	5

Third round
(Spain) C Suárez Navarro	7	6
(Serbia) J Janković	5	4
9	(France) M Bartoli	6	7^{7}
(Germany) J Görges	3	6^{2}

Quarterfinals
(Spain) C Suárez Navarro	0	6	4
9	(France) M Bartoli	6	2	6

=== Bottom half ===
==== Section 3 ====
First round
7	(China) N Li	6	6
(Italy) F Schiavone	2	3
(Belgium) Y Wickmayer	5	5
(China) S Peng	7	7
(Kazakhstan) Y Shvedova	6	4
12	(Slovakia) D Cibulková	4	1^{r}
15	(Italy) R Vinci	7^{7}	6^{4}	2
Q	(Spain) L Domínguez Lino	6^{4}	7^{7}	6
WC	(Japan) K Date-Krumm	4	4
Q	(United Kingdom) L Robson	6	6
WC	(China) S Zhang	6	6
WC	(China) Q Wang	3	2

Second round
7	(China) N Li	6	6
(Russia) N Petrova	1	2
(China) S Peng	5	7	6
(Kazakhstan) Y Shvedova	7	5	2
Q	(Spain) L Domínguez Lino	7	6
Q	(United Kingdom) L Robson	5	3
WC	(China) S Zhang	2	3
3	(Poland) A Radwańska	6	6

Third round
7	(China) N Li	4	6	7^{7}
(China) S Peng	6	2	6^{3}
Q	(Spain) L Domínguez Lino	6	1	4
3	(Poland) A Radwańska	2	6	6

Quarterfinals
7	(China) N Li	6	6
3	(Poland) A Radwańska	4	2

==== Section 4 ====
First round
Q	(Spain) L Arruabarrena Vecino	6	6
(China) J Zheng	2	4
(Chinese Taipei) S-w Hsieh	6	6
WC	(China) S Zheng	2	3
(South Africa) C Scheepers	5	7^{8}	2
10	(Denmark) C Wozniacki	7	6^{6}	6
13	(Russia) M Kirilenko	3	3
(Russia) E Makarova	6	6
Q	(Slovenia) P Hercog	5	6	3
(Russia) A Pavlyuchenkova	7	4	0^{r}
(Sweden) S Arvidsson	2	3
(Romania) S Cîrstea	6	6
(Romania) S Halep	5	5
2	(Russia) M Sharapova	7	7

Second round
5	(Germany) A Kerber	6	6
Q	(Spain) L Arruabarrena Vecino	2	0
(Chinese Taipei) S-w Hsieh	7^{7}	6^{3}	0
10	(Denmark) C Wozniacki	6^{5}	7^{7}	6
(Russia) E Makarova	6^{5}	6	6^{3}
Q	(Slovenia) P Hercog	7^{7}	3	7^{7}
(Romania) S Cîrstea	2	2
2	(Russia) M Sharapova	6	6

Third round
5	(Germany) A Kerber	6	2	6
10	(Denmark) C Wozniacki	1	6	4
Q	(Slovenia) P Hercog	0	2
2	(Russia) M Sharapova	6	6

Quarterfinals
5	(Germany) A Kerber	0	0^{r}
2	(Russia) M Sharapova	6	3

== Qualifying ==
=== Seeds ===
1. (Georgia (country)) Anna Tatishvili (first round)
2. (Belarus) Olga Govortsova (qualifying competition, lucky loser)
3. (Serbia) Bojana Jovanovski (qualified)
4. (United Kingdom) Laura Robson (qualified)
5. (Hungary) Tímea Babos (first round)
6. (Luxembourg) Mandy Minella (first round)
7. (Spain) Lourdes Domínguez Lino (qualified)
8. (Croatia) Petra Martić (first round)
9. (Russia) Elena Vesnina (qualified)
10. (France) Pauline Parmentier (qualifying competition)
11. (Australia) Casey Dellacqua (first round)
12. (United Kingdom) Heather Watson (qualifying competition)
13. (Japan) Ayumi Morita (qualified)
14. (Czech Republic) Barbora Záhlavová-Strýcová (withdrew, still competing in Tokyo)
15. (Sweden) Johanna Larsson (qualifying competition)
16. (Kazakhstan) Galina Voskoboeva (qualifying competition)
17. (France) Mathilde Johansson (first round)

=== Qualifiers ===
1. (Spain) Lara Arruabarrena Vecino
2. (Russia) Elena Vesnina
3. (Serbia) Bojana Jovanovski
4. (United Kingdom) Laura Robson
5. (Slovenia) Polona Hercog
6. (Italy) Camila Giorgi
7. (Spain) Lourdes Domínguez Lino
8. (Japan) Ayumi Morita

=== Lucky losers ===
1. (Belarus) Olga Govortsova

=== Draw ===
==== First qualifier ====
First round
1	(Georgia (country)) Anna Tatishvili	4	3
(Spain) Lara Arruabarrena Vecino	6	6
Alt	(Russia) Vera Dushevina	6	6
11	(Australia) Casey Dellacqua	3	3

Qualifying competition
(Spain) Lara Arruabarrena Vecino	7	7
Alt	(Russia) Vera Dushevina	5	5

==== Second qualifier ====
First round
2	(Belarus) Olga Govortsova	6	6
(Kazakhstan) Sesil Karatantcheva	4	3
WC	(Canada) Eugenie Bouchard	3	6	1
9	(Russia) Elena Vesnina	6	2	6

Qualifying competition
2	(Belarus) Olga Govortsova	2	4
9	(Russia) Elena Vesnina	6	6

==== Third qualifier ====
First round
3	(Serbia) Bojana Jovanovski	6	6
(Spain) Sílvia Soler Espinosa	1	0
WC	(China) Tang Hao Chen	2	3
16	(Kazakhstan) Galina Voskoboeva	6	6

Qualifying competition
3	(Serbia) Bojana Jovanovski	3	6	6
16	(Kazakhstan) Galina Voskoboeva	6	4	3

==== Fourth qualifier ====
First round
4	(United Kingdom) Laura Robson	6	6
(Spain) Garbiñe Muguruza	3	3
(United States) Julia Cohen	5	1
15	(Sweden) Johanna Larsson	7	6

Qualifying competition
4	(United Kingdom) Laura Robson	4	6	6
15	(Sweden) Johanna Larsson	6	2	1

==== Fifth qualifier ====
First round
5	(Hungary) Tímea Babos	2	5
(Hungary) Gréta Arn	6	7
(Slovenia) Polona Hercog	6	6
17	(France) Mathilde Johansson	3	4

Qualifying competition
(Hungary) Gréta Arn	3	6	0
(Slovenia) Polona Hercog	6	3	6

==== Sixth qualifier ====
First round
6	(Luxembourg) Mandy Minella	2	4
(Italy) Camila Giorgi	6	6
WC	(China) Tian Ran	5	2
12	(United Kingdom) Heather Watson	7	6

Qualifying competition
(Italy) Camila Giorgi	5	6	6
12	(United Kingdom) Heather Watson	7	2	3

==== Seventh qualifier ====
First round
7	(Spain) Lourdes Domínguez Lino	3	6	6
WC	(China) Wang Yafan	6	3	4
(Spain) María José Martínez Sánchez	3	6^{3}
10	(France) Pauline Parmentier	6	7^{7}

Qualifying competition
7	(Spain) Lourdes Domínguez Lino	6	6
10	(France) Pauline Parmentier	2	4

==== Eighth qualifier ====
First round
8	(Croatia) Petra Martić	2	2
(Russia) Olga Puchkova	6	6
(Greece) Eleni Daniilidou	2	2
13	(Japan) Ayumi Morita	6	6

Qualifying competition
(Russia) Olga Puchkova	3	3
13	(Japan) Ayumi Morita	6	6
