= 2014 China Open – Men's doubles =

Men's doubles
- 2014 China Open

Final
- Champions: (Netherlands) Jean-Julien Rojer (Romania) Horia Tecău
- Runners-up: (France) Julien Benneteau (Canada) Vasek Pospisil
- Score: 6–7^{(6–8)}, 7–5, [10–5]

Events
Singles	men	women
Doubles	men	women
← 2013 ·	China Open	· 2015 →

Max Mirnyi and Horia Tecău were the defending champions, but chose not to participate together. Mirnyi played alongside Feliciano López, but lost in the quarterfinals to Julien Benneteau and Vasek Pospisil.
Tecău teamed up with Jean-Julien Rojer and successfully defended the title, defeating Benneteau and Pospisil in the final, 6–7^{(6–8)}, 7–5, [10–5].

== Seeds ==
1. (Canada) Daniel Nestor / (Serbia) Nenad Zimonjić (first round)
2. (Austria) Alexander Peya / (Brazil) Bruno Soares (first round)
3. (Spain) David Marrero / (Spain) Fernando Verdasco (withdrew)
4. (France) Julien Benneteau / (Canada) Vasek Pospisil (final)

== Draw ==
=== Key ===
- Q = Qualifier
- WC = Wild card
- LL = Lucky loser
- Alt = Alternate
- SE = Special exempt
- PR = Protected ranking
- ITF = ITF entry
- JE = Junior exempt
- w/o = Walkover
- r = Retired
- d = Defaulted
- SR = Special ranking

=== Draw ===
First round
1	(Canada) D Nestor (Serbia) N Zimonjić	6	3	[6]
(Italy) F Fognini (Argentina) L Mayer	3	6	[10]
(Latvia) E Gulbis (Poland) M Matkowski
WC	(Serbia) N Djokovic (Serbia) F Krajinović	w/o
LL	(Russia) T Gabashvili (Kazakhstan) M Kukushkin	2	3
(Netherlands) J-J Rojer (Romania) H Tecău	6	6
(Czech Republic) T Berdych (United States) J Isner	7	4	[10]
(Spain) P Andújar (Spain) R Nadal	5	6	[4]
(Spain) F López (Belarus) M Mirnyi	7^{7}	7^{7}
(Poland) Ł Kubot (Sweden) R Lindstedt	6^{4}	6^{3}
WC	(China) S Liu (China) Y Ning	3	1
4	(France) J Benneteau (Canada) V Pospisil	6	6
Q	(Sweden) J Brunström (United States) N Monroe	6	6
(Croatia) M Čilić (Mexico) S González	3	3
(Colombia) JS Cabal (Colombia) R Farah	6	4	[10]
2	(Austria) A Peya (Brazil) B Soares	3	6	[7]

Quarterfinals
(Italy) F Fognini (Argentina) L Mayer	w/o
WC	(Serbia) N Djokovic (Serbia) F Krajinović
(Netherlands) J-J Rojer (Romania) H Tecău	7^{7}	4	[12]
(Czech Republic) T Berdych (United States) J Isner	6^{3}	6	[10]
(Spain) F López (Belarus) M Mirnyi	3	6^{5}
4	(France) J Benneteau (Canada) V Pospisil	6	7^{7}
Q	(Sweden) J Brunström (United States) N Monroe	6^{4}	6	[10]
(Colombia) JS Cabal (Colombia) R Farah	7^{7}	3	[7]

Semifinals
(Italy) F Fognini (Argentina) L Mayer	4	4
(Netherlands) J-J Rojer (Romania) H Tecău	6	6
4	(France) J Benneteau (Canada) V Pospisil	6^{5}	6	[10]
Q	(Sweden) J Brunström (United States) N Monroe	7^{7}	2	[5]

Final
(Netherlands) J-J Rojer (Romania) H Tecău	6^{6}	7	[10]
4	(France) J Benneteau (Canada) V Pospisil	7^{8}	5	[5]

== Qualifying ==
=== Qualifying seeds ===
1. (Argentina) Máximo González / (Pakistan) Aisam-ul-Haq Qureshi (first round)
2. (Sweden) Johan Brunström / (United States) Nicholas Monroe (qualified)

=== Qualifiers ===
1. (Sweden) Johan Brunström / (United States) Nicholas Monroe

=== Lucky losers ===
1. (Russia) Teymuraz Gabashvili / (Kazakhstan) Mikhail Kukushkin

=== Qualifying draw ===
First round				Qualifying competition
1	(Argentina) Máximo González (Pakistan) Aisam-ul-Haq Qureshi	4	6^{6}
	(Russia) Teymuraz Gabashvili (Kazakhstan) Mikhail Kukushkin	6	7^{8}		(Russia) Teymuraz Gabashvili (Kazakhstan) Mikhail Kukushkin	4	6	[6]
	(Australia) Matthew Ebden (Slovakia) Martin Kližan			2	(Sweden) Johan Brunström (United States) Nicholas Monroe	6	3	[10]
2	(Sweden) Johan Brunström (United States) Nicholas Monroe	w/o
