= 2013 China Open – Men's doubles =

Men's doubles
- 2013 China Open

Final
- Champions: (Belarus) Max Mirnyi (Romania) Horia Tecău
- Runners-up: (Italy) Fabio Fognini (Italy) Andreas Seppi
- Score: 6-4, 6-2

Events
Singles	men	women
Doubles	men	women
← 2012 ·	China Open	· 2014 →

Bob and Mike Bryan were the defending champions, but decided to compete in Tokyo instead.
Max Mirnyi and Horia Tecău won the title, defeating Fabio Fognini and Andreas Seppi in the final, 6–4, 6–2.

== Seeds ==
1. (Canada) Daniel Nestor / (India) Leander Paes (semifinals)
2. (India) Mahesh Bhupathi / (Sweden) Robert Lindstedt (first round)
3. (Pakistan) Aisam-ul-Haq Qureshi / (Netherlands) Jean-Julien Rojer (quarterfinals)
4. (France) Julien Benneteau / (Serbia) Nenad Zimonjić (first round)

== Draw ==
=== Key ===
- Q = Qualifier
- WC = Wild card
- LL = Lucky loser
- Alt = Alternate
- SE = Special exempt
- PR = Protected ranking
- ITF = ITF entry
- JE = Junior exempt
- w/o = Walkover
- r = Retired
- d = Defaulted
- SR = Special ranking

=== Draw ===
First round
1	(Canada) D Nestor (India) L Paes	6	6
(United States) J Isner (United States) S Querrey	2	2
(Spain) D Marrero (Spain) F Verdasco	7	6^{5}	[10]
(Bulgaria) G Dimitrov (Spain) T Robredo	5	7^{7}	[7]
3	(Pakistan) A-u-H Qureshi (Netherlands) J-J Rojer	6	6
WC	(Chinese Taipei) Y-h Lu (China) D Wu	4	3
(Poland) M Fyrstenberg (Poland) M Matkowski	2	4
(Italy) F Fognini (Italy) A Seppi	6	6
(Germany) P Kohlschreiber (Russia) M Youzhny	6^{8}	6	[7]
(United Kingdom) C Fleming (United Kingdom) J Marray	7^{10}	4	[10]
(Belarus) M Mirnyi (Romania) H Tecău	6	6
4	(France) J Benneteau (Serbia) N Zimonjić	3	4
(Germany) T Haas (Germany) F Mayer	7	3	[10]
WC	(China) M Gong (China) Z Li	5	6	[8]
(Serbia) N Djokovic (Switzerland) S Wawrinka	6	6
2	(India) M Bhupathi (Sweden) R Lindstedt	3	3

Quarterfinals
1	(Canada) D Nestor (India) L Paes	7^{10}	6
(Spain) D Marrero (Spain) F Verdasco	6^{8}	3
3	(Pakistan) A-u-H Qureshi (Netherlands) J-J Rojer	2	6^{5}
(Italy) F Fognini (Italy) A Seppi	6	7^{7}
(United Kingdom) C Fleming (United Kingdom) J Marray	4	6^{3}
(Belarus) M Mirnyi (Romania) H Tecău	6	7^{7}
(Germany) T Haas (Germany) F Mayer	2	1
(Serbia) N Djokovic (Switzerland) S Wawrinka	6	6

Semifinals
1	(Canada) D Nestor (India) L Paes	6	5	[8]
(Italy) F Fognini (Italy) A Seppi	3	7	[10]
(Belarus) M Mirnyi (Romania) H Tecău	w/o
(Serbia) N Djokovic (Switzerland) S Wawrinka

Final
(Italy) F Fognini (Italy) A Seppi	4	2
(Belarus) M Mirnyi (Romania) H Tecău	6	6
