= 2013 China Open – Men's singles =

Men's singles
- 2013 China Open

Final
- Champion: (Serbia) Novak Djokovic
- Runner-up: (Spain) Rafael Nadal
- Score: 6–3, 6–4

Events
Singles	men	women
Doubles	men	women
← 2012 ·	China Open	· 2014 →

Defending champion Novak Djokovic defeated Rafael Nadal in the final, 6–3, 6–4 to win the men's singles tennis title at the 2013 China Open. The defeat was Nadal's first hardcourt loss of the season, having previously won titles in Indian Wells, Montreal, Cincinnati and the US Open. His winning streak ended at 26 matches.

By reaching the final, Nadal regained the world No. 1 ranking from Djokovic.

== Seeds ==
1. (Serbia) Novak Djokovic (champion)
2. (Spain) Rafael Nadal (final)
3. (Spain) David Ferrer (quarterfinals)
4. (Czech Republic) Tomáš Berdych (semifinals, retired because of back injury)
5. (France) Richard Gasquet (semifinals)
6. (Switzerland) Stanislas Wawrinka (second round)
7. (Germany) Tommy Haas (first round)
8. (United States) John Isner (quarterfinals)

== Draw ==
=== Key ===
- Q = Qualifier
- WC = Wild card
- LL = Lucky loser
- Alt = Alternate
- SE = Special exempt
- PR = Protected ranking
- ITF = ITF entry
- JE = Junior exempt
- w/o = Walkover
- r = Retired
- d = Defaulted
- SR = Special ranking

=== Finals ===
Semifinals
1	(Serbia) Novak Djokovic	6	6
5	(France) Richard Gasquet	4	2
4	(Czech Republic) Tomáš Berdych	2^{r}
2	(Spain) Rafael Nadal	4

Final
1	(Serbia) Novak Djokovic	6	6
2	(Spain) Rafael Nadal	3	4

=== Top half ===
First round
1	(Serbia) N Djokovic	6	6
(Czech Republic) L Rosol	0	3
(Spain) F Verdasco	7^{8}	6
Q	(India) S Devvarman	6^{6}	3
(United States) S Querrey	7^{7}	6
(Russia) M Youzhny	6^{3}	3
(Italy) A Seppi	6	3	4
6	(Switzerland) S Wawrinka	4	6	6
3	(Spain) D Ferrer	6	3	7^{7}
(Canada) V Pospisil	4	6	6^{2}
(Australia) M Matosevic	7^{7}	6
(France) J Benneteau	6^{5}	3
(Australia) B Tomic	7^{7}	6
WC	(China) Z Zhang	6^{4}	4
(Germany) F Mayer	3	6^{2}
5	(France) R Gasquet	6	7^{7}

Second round
1	(Serbia) N Djokovic	7	2	6
(Spain) F Verdasco	5	6	2
(United States) S Querrey	6	7^{7}
6	(Switzerland) S Wawrinka	3	6^{2}
3	(Spain) D Ferrer	5	6	6
(Australia) M Matosevic	7	1	2
(Australia) B Tomic	6^{2}	4
5	(France) R Gasquet	7^{7}	6

Quarterfinals
1	(Serbia) N Djokovic	6	6
(United States) S Querrey	1	2
3	(Spain) D Ferrer	3	4
5	(France) R Gasquet	6	6

Semifinals
1	(Serbia) N Djokovic	6	6
5	(France) R Gasquet	4	2

=== Bottom half ===
First round
8	(United States) J Isner	5	7^{7}	6
WC	(China) D Wu	7	6^{4}	3
(Bulgaria) G Dimitrov	4	2
Q	(Spain) R Bautista-Agut	6	6
Q	(Chinese Taipei) Y-h Lu	6^{3}	4
(Russia) N Davydenko	7^{7}	6
(Spain) P Andújar	4	1
4	(Czech Republic) T Berdych	6	6
7	(Germany) T Haas	6^{6}	3
WC	(Australia) L Hewitt	7^{8}	6
(Italy) F Fognini	7	4	6
(Spain) T Robredo	5	6	3
(Spain) A Montañés	5	6	6^{4}
(Germany) P Kohlschreiber	7	1	7^{7}
Q	(Colombia) S Giraldo	2	4
2	(Spain) R Nadal	6	6

Second round
8	(United States) J Isner	6	6^{3}	6
Q	(Spain) R Bautista-Agut	2	7^{7}	4
(Russia) N Davydenko
4	(Czech Republic) T Berdych	w/o
WC	(Australia) L Hewitt	0	2
(Italy) F Fognini	6	6
(Germany) P Kohlschreiber	4	6^{3}
2	(Spain) R Nadal	6	7^{7}

Quarterfinals
8	(United States) J Isner	5	2
4	(Czech Republic) T Berdych	7	6
(Italy) F Fognini	6	4	1
2	(Spain) R Nadal	2	6	6

Semifinals
4	(Czech Republic) T Berdych	2^{r}
2	(Spain) R Nadal	4

== Qualifying ==
=== Seeds ===
1. (Chinese Taipei) Lu Yen-hsun (qualified)
2. (Netherlands) Robin Haase (first round)
3. (Spain) Roberto Bautista-Agut (qualified)
4. (Spain) Daniel Gimeno-Traver (first round)
5. (Spain) Pablo Carreño Busta (first round)
6. (Russia) Alex Bogomolov Jr. (qualifying competition)
7. (Poland) Łukasz Kubot (first round)
8. (United States) Jack Sock (qualifying competition)

=== Qualifiers ===
1. (Chinese Taipei) Lu Yen-hsun
2. (India) Somdev Devvarman
3. (Spain) Roberto Bautista-Agut
4. (Colombia) Santiago Giraldo

=== Qualifying draw ===
==== First qualifier ====
First round
1	(Chinese Taipei) Lu Yen-hsun	6	6
WC	(China) Gong Maoxin	4	2
(Turkey) Marsel İlhan	3	6	7^{7}
7	(Poland) Łukasz Kubot	6	3	6^{4}

Qualifying competition
1	(Chinese Taipei) Lu Yen-hsun	7^{7}	3	6
(Turkey) Marsel İlhan	6^{4}	6	1

==== Second qualifier ====
First round
2	(Netherlands) Robin Haase	6	4	0
(India) Somdev Devvarman	2	6	6
(Italy) Paolo Lorenzi	7	6
5	(Spain) Pablo Carreño Busta	5	2

Qualifying competition
(India) Somdev Devvarman	3	7^{7}	6
(Italy) Paolo Lorenzi	6	6^{5}	3

==== Third qualifier ====
First round
3	(Spain) Roberto Bautista-Agut	6	7
WC	(China) Ouyang Bowen	1	5
(South Africa) Rik de Voest	2	4^{r}
8	(United States) Jack Sock	6	5

Qualifying competition
3	(Spain) Roberto Bautista-Agut	4	6	6
8	(United States) Jack Sock	6	2	1

==== Fourth qualifier ====
First round
4	(Spain) Daniel Gimeno-Traver	4	2
(Colombia) Santiago Giraldo	6	6
WC	(China) Li Zhe	1	2
6	(Russia) Alex Bogomolov Jr.	6	6

Qualifying competition
(Colombia) Santiago Giraldo	6	6
6	(Russia) Alex Bogomolov Jr.	4	4
