= 2014 China Open – Women's singles =

Women's singles
- 2014 China Open

Final
- Champion: (Russia) Maria Sharapova
- Runner-up: (Czech Republic) Petra Kvitová
- Score: 6–4, 2–6, 6–3

Details
- Seeds: 16

Events
Singles	men	women
Doubles	men	women
- China Open

Maria Sharapova defeated Petra Kvitová in the final, 6–4, 2–6, 6–3 to win the women's singles tennis title at the 2014 China Open.

Serena Williams was the defending champion, but withdrew before her quarterfinal match with a left knee injury.

== Seeds ==
1. (United States) Serena Williams (quarterfinals, withdrew because of a knee injury)
2. (Romania) Simona Halep (quarterfinals, withdrew because of a hip injury)
3. (Czech Republic) Petra Kvitová (final)
4. (Russia) Maria Sharapova (champion)
5. (Poland) Agnieszka Radwańska (second round)
6. (Denmark) Caroline Wozniacki (second round)
7. (Germany) Angelique Kerber (third round)
8. (Canada) Eugenie Bouchard (second round)
9. (Serbia) Ana Ivanovic (semifinals)
10. (Serbia) Jelena Janković (first round)
11. (Italy) Sara Errani (first round)
12. (Russia) Ekaterina Makarova (third round)
13. (Czech Republic) Lucie Šafářová (third round)
14. (Italy) Flavia Pennetta (second round)
15. (Germany) Andrea Petkovic (third round)
16. (United States) Venus Williams (third round, withdrew because of a viral illness)

Click on the seed number of a player to go to their draw section.

The four Wuhan semifinalists received a bye into the second round. They were as follows:

- (Canada) Eugenie Bouchard
- (Czech Republic) Petra Kvitová
- (Ukraine) Elina Svitolina
- (Denmark) Caroline Wozniacki

== Draw ==
Key

- Q = Qualifier
- WC = Wild card
- LL = Lucky loser
- Alt = Alternate
- ITF = ITF entry
- PR = Protected ranking
- SR = Special ranking
- SE = Special exempt
- JE = Junior exempt
- JR = Junior Accelerator Programme entrant
- CO = College Accelerator Programme entrant
- NG = Next Gen Accelerator Program entrant
- w/o = Walkover
- r = Retired
- d = Defaulted

=== Finals ===
Quarterfinals
1	(United States) Serena Williams
(Australia) Samantha Stosur	w/o
3	(Czech Republic) Petra Kvitová	7^{7}	6
(Italy) Roberta Vinci	6^{2}	4
(Russia) Svetlana Kuznetsova	0	4
4	(Russia) Maria Sharapova	6	6
9	(Serbia) Ana Ivanovic	w/o
2	(Romania) Simona Halep

Semifinals
(Australia) Samantha Stosur	3	7	2
3	(Czech Republic) Petra Kvitová	6	5	6
4	(Russia) Maria Sharapova	6	6
9	(Serbia) Ana Ivanovic	0	4

Final
3	(Czech Republic) Petra Kvitová	4	6	3
4	(Russia) Maria Sharapova	6	2	6

=== Top half ===
==== Section 1 ====
First round
1	(United States) S Williams	7	6
Q	(Spain) S Soler Espinosa	5	2
WC	(Russia) M Kirilenko	4	1
Q	(Bulgaria) T Pironkova	6	6
Q	(United States) B Mattek-Sands	6	1	4
Q	(Germany) M Barthel	4	6	6
(Italy) C Giorgi	6^{3}	4
13	(Czech Republic) L Šafářová	7^{7}	6
10	(Serbia) J Janković	5	6	4
(France) A Cornet	7	3	6
(United States) L Davis	6	6
Q	(China) Y Xu	3	3
(Australia) S Stosur	6	6
WC	(Italy) F Schiavone	4	2

Second round
1	(United States) S Williams	6	6
Q	(Bulgaria) T Pironkova	2	3
Q	(Germany) M Barthel	3	3
13	(Czech Republic) L Šafářová	6	6
(France) A Cornet	6	6
(United States) L Davis	2	1
(Australia) S Stosur	6	7^{11}
6	(Denmark) C Wozniacki	4	6^{9}

Third round
1	(United States) S Williams	6	1	6
13	(Czech Republic) L Šafářová	1	6	2
(France) A Cornet	4	2
(Australia) S Stosur	6	6

Quarterfinals
1	(United States) S Williams
(Australia) S Stosur	w/o

==== Section 2 ====
First round
WC	(China) K Zhang	4	1
(China) S Peng	6	6
(China) S Zhang	1	4
(France) C Garcia	6	6
(United Kingdom) H Watson	3	1
16	(United States) V Williams	6	6
12	(Russia) E Makarova	6^{8}	6	6
(Spain) G Muguruza	7^{10}	4	4
(Czech Republic) Ka Plíšková	4	6	2
Q	(Slovenia) P Hercog	6	2	6
(Italy) R Vinci	6	2	6
(Kazakhstan) Y Shvedova	2	6	1
(United States) C Vandeweghe	4	3
5	(Poland) A Radwańska	6	6

Second round
3	(Czech Republic) P Kvitová	6	6
(China) S Peng	4	2
(France) C Garcia	4	3
16	(United States) V Williams	6	6
12	(Russia) E Makarova	7	6
Q	(Slovenia) P Hercog	5	0
(Italy) R Vinci	6	6
5	(Poland) A Radwańska	4	4

Third round
3	(Czech Republic) P Kvitová	w/o
16	(United States) V Williams
12	(Russia) E Makarova	1	6	5
(Italy) R Vinci	6	0	7

Quarterfinals
3	(Czech Republic) P Kvitová	7^{7}	6
(Italy) R Vinci	6^{2}	4

=== Bottom half ===
==== Section 3 ====
First round
7	(Germany) A Kerber	6	3	6
(Australia) C Dellacqua	1	6	3
(Kazakhstan) Z Diyas	6	6
(Czech Republic) K Koukalová	1	4
(Russia) S Kuznetsova	6	1
(Slovakia) D Hantuchová	2	1^{r}
(Japan) K Nara	3	6	6
11	(Italy) S Errani	6	3	4
14	(Italy) F Pennetta	7^{7}	6
(United States) C McHale	6^{3}	4
(Spain) C Suárez Navarro	6	6
(Belgium) K Flipkens	2	4
(Estonia) K Kanepi	4	1
4	(Russia) M Sharapova	6	6

Second round
7	(Germany) A Kerber	6	6
(Kazakhstan) Z Diyas	3	1
(Russia) S Kuznetsova	6	6
(Japan) K Nara	3	1
14	(Italy) F Pennetta	1	6	2
(Spain) C Suárez Navarro	6	3	6
(Ukraine) E Svitolina	2	2
4	(Russia) M Sharapova	6	6

Third round
7	(Germany) A Kerber	6	4	3
(Russia) S Kuznetsova	2	6	6
(Spain) C Suárez Navarro	1	6^{3}
4	(Russia) M Sharapova	6	7^{7}

Quarterfinals
(Russia) S Kuznetsova	0	4
4	(Russia) M Sharapova	6	6

==== Section 4 ====
First round
WC	(China) S Xu	6	2	0
(Germany) S Lisicki	4	6	6
PR	(Switzerland) R Oprandi	6	6
(Serbia) B Jovanovski	2	4
Q	(Switzerland) B Bencic	2	1
9	(Serbia) A Ivanovic	6	6
15	(Germany) A Petkovic	2	7^{10}	6
Q	(Romania) M Niculescu	6	6^{8}	4
(United States) M Keys	6	6^{3}	7
(United States) A Riske	3	7^{7}	5
WC	(China) L Zhu	6	3
(Russia) A Pavlyuchenkova	3	3^{r}
(Czech Republic) B Záhlavová-Strýcová	1	4
2	(Romania) S Halep	6	6

Second round
8	(Canada) E Bouchard	2	4
(Germany) S Lisicki	6	6
PR	(Switzerland) R Oprandi	4	2
9	(Serbia) A Ivanovic	6	6
15	(Germany) A Petkovic	6	6
(United States) M Keys	2	3
WC	(China) L Zhu	5	4
2	(Romania) S Halep	7	6

Third round
(Germany) S Lisicki	3	5
9	(Serbia) A Ivanovic	6	7
15	(Germany) A Petkovic	6^{4}	7	6^{1}
2	(Romania) S Halep	7^{7}	5	7^{7}

Quarterfinals
9	(Serbia) A Ivanovic	w/o
2	(Romania) S Halep

== Qualifying ==
=== Seeds ===
1. (Switzerland) Belinda Bencic (qualified)
2. (United States) Varvara Lepchenko (qualifying competition)
3. (Romania) Monica Niculescu (qualified)
4. (Bulgaria) Tsvetana Pironkova (qualified)
5. (Germany) Mona Barthel (qualified)
6. (Germany) Annika Beck (first round)
7. (Puerto Rico) Monica Puig (qualifying competition)
8. (Switzerland) Stefanie Vögele (qualifying competition)
9. (Croatia) Ajla Tomljanović (qualifying competition)
10. (Spain) Sílvia Soler Espinosa (qualified)
11. (Slovenia) Polona Hercog (qualified)
12. (Belgium) Alison Van Uytvanck (qualifying competition)
13. (Spain) María Teresa Torró Flor (first round)
14. (United States) Shelby Rogers (qualifying competition)
15. (Australia) Jarmila Gajdošová (first round)
16. (South Africa) Chanelle Scheepers (first round)

=== Qualifiers ===
1. (Switzerland) Belinda Bencic
2. (Spain) Sílvia Soler Espinosa
3. (Romania) Monica Niculescu
4. (Bulgaria) Tsvetana Pironkova
5. (Germany) Mona Barthel
6. (China) Xu Yifan
7. (Slovenia) Polona Hercog
8. (United States) Bethanie Mattek-Sands

=== Draw ===
==== First qualifier ====
First round
1	(Switzerland) Belinda Bencic	6	6
WC	(China) Tian Ran	0	4
WC	(China) Yang Zhaoxuan	0	3
14	(United States) Shelby Rogers	6	6

Qualifying competition
1	(Switzerland) Belinda Bencic	5	7^{7}	6
14	(United States) Shelby Rogers	7	6^{2}	1

==== Second qualifier ====
First round
2	(United States) Varvara Lepchenko	6	5	6
(Croatia) Donna Vekić	3	7	2
(France) Kristina Mladenovic	1	5
10	(Spain) Sílvia Soler Espinosa	6	7

Qualifying competition
2	(United States) Varvara Lepchenko	6	5	2
10	(Spain) Sílvia Soler Espinosa	1	7	6

==== Third qualifier ====
First round
3	(Romania) Monica Niculescu	6	6
(Poland) Magda Linette	1	0
WC	(China) Han Xinyun	2	4
12	(Belgium) Alison Van Uytvanck	6	6

Qualifying competition
3	(Romania) Monica Niculescu	6	6
12	(Belgium) Alison Van Uytvanck	3	2

==== Fourth qualifier ====
First round
4	(Bulgaria) Tsvetana Pironkova	4	6	7
(United States) Nicole Gibbs	6	2	5
(Romania) Sorana Cîrstea	4	4
9	(Croatia) Ajla Tomljanović	6	6

Qualifying competition
4	(Bulgaria) Tsvetana Pironkova	6	6
9	(Croatia) Ajla Tomljanović	3	1

==== Fifth qualifier ====
First round
5	(Germany) Mona Barthel	6	2	6
(Japan) Misaki Doi	4	6	4
(New Zealand) Marina Erakovic	6	6
13	(Spain) María Teresa Torró Flor	2	1

Qualifying competition
5	(Germany) Mona Barthel	6	6
(New Zealand) Marina Erakovic	3	3

==== Sixth qualifier ====
First round
6	(Germany) Annika Beck	3	2
(Russia) Alla Kudryavtseva	6	6
WC	(China) Xu Yifan	6	2	6
16	(South Africa) Chanelle Scheepers	4	6	2

Qualifying competition
(Russia) Alla Kudryavtseva	2	1
WC	(China) Xu Yifan	6	6

==== Seventh qualifier ====
First round
7	(Puerto Rico) Monica Puig	2	6	6
(Belarus) Olga Govortsova	6	2	2
(Kazakhstan) Yulia Putintseva	6^{5}	7	4
11	(Slovenia) Polona Hercog	7^{7}	5	6

Qualifying competition
7	(Puerto Rico) Monica Puig	3	1
11	(Slovenia) Polona Hercog	6	6

==== Eighth qualifier ====
First round
8	(Switzerland) Stefanie Vögele	6	6
(Luxembourg) Mandy Minella	1	2
PR	(United States) Bethanie Mattek-Sands	4	6	6
15	(Australia) Jarmila Gajdošová	6	3	1

Qualifying competition
8	(Switzerland) Stefanie Vögele	4	4
PR	(United States) Bethanie Mattek-Sands	6	6
