= Abigail Spears =

American tennis player

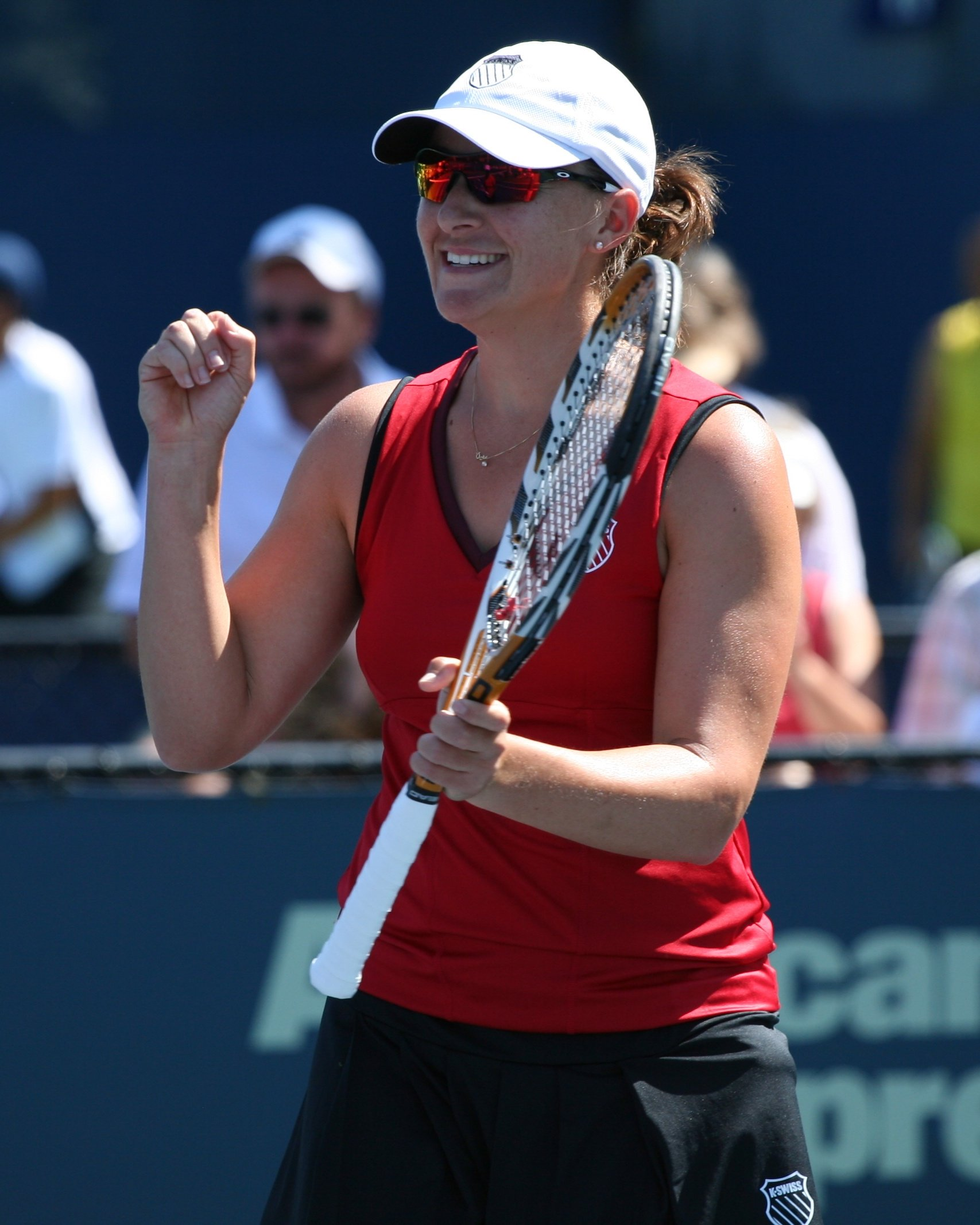
- Spears at the 2009 US Open
- Country (sports): United States
- Born: July 12, 1981 (age 44) San Diego, California, U.S.
- Height: 1.75 m (5 ft 9 in)
- Turned pro: October 2000
- Retired: 2021
- Plays: Right-handed (two-handed backhand)
- Coach: Larry Willens
- Prize money: $2,994,112

Singles
- Career record: 285–262
- Career titles: 0
- Highest ranking: No. 66 (June 6, 2005)

Grand Slam singles results
- Australian Open: 3R (2005)
- French Open: 1R (2005)
- Wimbledon: 1R (2005)
- US Open: 1R (2004, 2005)

Doubles
- Career record: 555–411
- Career titles: 21
- Highest ranking: No. 10 (March 2, 2015)

Grand Slam doubles results
- Australian Open: SF (2014)
- French Open: 3R (2004)
- Wimbledon: SF (2015, 2016, 2018)
- US Open: QF (2008)

Mixed doubles
- Career titles: 1

Grand Slam mixed doubles results
- Australian Open: W (2017)
- French Open: QF (2018)
- Wimbledon: QF (2018)
- US Open: F (2013, 2014)
- Last updated on: February 3, 2020.

Abigail Michal Spears (born July 12, 1981) is a former professional tennis player from the United States. Spears won 21 double titles including the 2017 Australian Open.

Spears started playing tennis in 1988 when she was 7 years old, and turned professional in 2000. Spears and compatriot, Raquel Kops-Jones, were one of the most successful doubles team of the 2012 season, winning four tour titles and reaching the quarterfinals of Wimbledon. In 2017, Spears partnered with Juan Sebastián Cabal at the Australian Open to win the mixed-doubles tournament. After being suspended for much of the 2020 and 2021 seasons, Spears retired in September 2021.

== Biography ==
July 12, 1981 Abigail Spears was born in San Diego, California, she is a distant relation of the well known singer Britney Spears.

=== 2000–2010 ===
Spears turned professional in 2000. She reached the third round at the 2005 Australian Open and the first round at the 2005 French Open, 2005 Wimbledon tournament (where she also reached the third round in the doubles tournament with Lisa McShea), and the 2005 US Open. She reached the third round at the 2008 Wimbledon doubles tournament with Raquel Kops-Jones, and the duo bettered that result by reaching the quarterfinals at the 2008 US Open.

Spears also qualified in singles for the US Open twice. She achieved a singles ranking of world No. 66 on June 6, 2005. Her highest doubles ranking was world No. 11 on June 24, 2013. Spears has not won a WTA singles title, but as of the end of December 2018 she has won 21 WTA doubles titles. She participated in the US Open doubles draw eleven times between 1998 and 2010.

=== 2010-2020 ===
Spears and compatriot Raquel Kops-Jones were one of the most successful doubles team of the 2012 season, winning four titles at Carlsbad, Seoul, Tokyo and Osaka. The pair also reached two other finals as well as the quarterfinals of Wimbledon.

2017 was expected to be Spears' farewell year on tour. At the Australian Open, she partnered with Juan Sebastián Cabal to win the mixed-doubles tournament. In the final, they defeated the second-seeded team of Sania Mirza and Ivan Dodig in straight sets. The American-Colombian duo recovered from a 1–4 deficit in the second set to reel off five straight games to clinch the title. It was a revenge match for Spears, having lost to Mirza the last time she made it to a Grand Slam final losing 9–11 in the super tiebreak to Mirza and Bruno Soares at the 2014 US Open.

=== Retirement ===
Spears was suspended for 22 months doping offences from 7 November 2019 until 6 September 2021. She retired from the pro tour on 16 September 2021.

In 2023, Spears played at the Peak Tennis Pro Am charity event in Missoula, Montana along with others such as Mats Wilander. In April 2024, Spears played at annual Gootter-Jensen charity event in Tucson along with Kim Clijsters and others.

== Personal life ==
Aside from tennis, Spears enjoys watching movies and going to the beach to surf or play beach volleyball. Her idols were Steffi Graf and Monica Seles.

== Significant finals ==
=== Grand Slam finals ===
==== Mixed doubles: 3 (1 title, 2 runner-ups) ====
Result	Year	Championship	Surface	Partner	Opponents	Score
Loss	2013	US Open	Hard	(Mexico) Santiago González	(Czech Republic) Andrea Hlaváčková (Belarus) Max Mirnyi	6–7^{(5–7)}, 3–6
Loss	2014	US Open	Hard	(Mexico) Santiago González	(India) Sania Mirza (Brazil) Bruno Soares	1–6, 6–2, [9–11]
Win	2017	Australian Open	Hard	(Colombia) Juan Sebastián Cabal	(India) Sania Mirza (Croatia) Ivan Dodig	6–2, 6–4

=== Premier Mandatory/Premier 5 finals ===
==== Doubles: 3 (2 titles, 1 runner-up) ====
Result	Year	Tournament	Surface	Partner	Opponents	Score
Loss	2012	Doha	Hard	(United States) Raquel Kops-Jones	(United States) Liezel Huber (United States) Lisa Raymond	3–6, 1–6
Win	2012	Tokyo	Hard	(United States) Raquel Kops-Jones	(Germany) Anna-Lena Grönefeld (Czech Republic) Květa Peschke	6–1, 6–4
Win	2014	Cincinnati	Hard	(United States) Raquel Kops-Jones	(Hungary) Tímea Babos (France) Kristina Mladenovic	6–1, 2–0 ret.

== WTA career finals ==
=== Singles: 1 (1 runner-up) ===
Winner — Legend
Grand Slam tournaments (0–0)
Tour Championships (0–0)
Tier I / Premier Mandatory & Premier 5 (0–0)
Tier II / Premier (0–0)
Tier III, IV & V / International (0–1)

Result	No.	Date	Tournament	Surface	Opponent	Score
Loss	1.	Nov 2004	Bell Challenge, Quebec City, Canada	Hard	(Slovakia) Martina Suchá	5–7, 6–3, 2–6

=== Doubles: 31 (21 titles, 10 runner-ups) ===
Winner — Legend
Grand Slam tournaments (0–0)
Tour Championships (0–0)
Tier I / Premier Mandatory & Premier 5 (2–1)
Tier II / Premier (8–5)
Tier III, IV & V / International (11–4)

Result	No.	Date	Tournament	Surface	Partner	Opponents	Score
Win	1.	Jan 2003	Auckland Open, New Zealand	Hard	(United States) Teryn Ashley	(Zimbabwe) Cara Black (Russia) Elena Likhovtseva	6–2, 2–6, 6–0
Win	2.	Aug 2004	Odlum Brown Vancouver Open, Canada	Hard	(United States) Bethanie Mattek	(Belgium) Els Callens (Germany) Anna-Lena Grönefeld	6–3, 6–3
Loss	1.	Feb 2005	Cellular South Cup, United States	Hard	(United States) Laura Granville	(Japan) Yuka Yoshida (Japan) Miho Saeki	3–6, 4–6
Win	3.	Jul 2005	Western & Southern Women's Open, United States	Hard	(United States) Laura Granville	(Czech Republic) Květa Peschke (Argentina) María Emilia Salerni	3–6, 6–2, 6–4
Win	4.	May 2009	Estoril Open, Portugal	Clay	(United States) Raquel Kops-Jones	(Canada) Sharon Fichman (Hungary) Katalin Marosi	2–6, 6–3, [10–5]
Loss	2.	Jun 2009	Aegon Classic, Birmingham, Great Britain	Grass	(United States) Raquel Kops-Jones	(Zimbabwe) Cara Black (United States) Liezel Huber	1–6, 4–6
Win	5.	Sep 2009	Hansol Korea Open, Seoul, South Korea	Hard	(Chinese Taipei) Chan Yung-jan	(United States) Carly Gullickson (Australia) Nicole Kriz	6–3, 6–4
Loss	3.	Oct 2009	HP Open, Osaka, Japan	Hard	(South Africa) Chanelle Scheepers	(United States) Lisa Raymond (Chinese Taipei) Chuang Chia-jung	2–6, 4–6
Loss	4.	Aug 2011	Mercury Insurance Open, San Diego, United States	Hard	(United States) Raquel Kops-Jones	(Czech Republic) Květa Peschke (Slovenia) Katarina Srebotnik	0–6, 2–6
Win	6.	Sep 2011	Bell Challenge, Quebec City	Hard	(United States) Raquel Kops-Jones	(United States) Jamie Hampton (Georgia (country)) Anna Tatishvili	6–0, 3–6, [10–6]
Loss	5.	Jan 2012	Brisbane International, Australia	Hard	(United States) Raquel Kops-Jones	(Spain) Nuria Llagostera Vives (Spain) Arantxa Parra Santonja	6–7^{(2–7)}, 6–7^{(2–7)}
Loss	6.	Feb 2012	Qatar Ladies Open, Doha	Hard	(United States) Raquel Kops-Jones	(United States) Liezel Huber (United States) Lisa Raymond	3–6, 1–6
Win	7.	Jul 2012	Mercury Insurance Open, Carlsbad, United States	Hard	(United States) Raquel Kops-Jones	(United States) Vania King (Russia) Nadia Petrova	6–2, 6–4
Win	8.	Sep 2012	Hansol Korea Open, Seoul	Hard	(United States) Raquel Kops-Jones	(Uzbekistan) Akgul Amanmuradova (United States) Vania King	2–6, 6–2, [10–8]
Win	9.	Sep 2012	Toray Pan Pacific Open, Tokyo, Japan	Hard	(United States) Raquel Kops-Jones	(Germany) Anna-Lena Grönefeld (Czech Republic) Květa Peschke	6–1, 6–4
Win	10.	Oct 2012	HP Open, Osaka	Hard	(United States) Raquel Kops-Jones	(Japan) Kimiko Date-Krumm (United Kingdom) Heather Watson	6–1, 6–4
Win	11.	Jul 2013	Bank of the West Classic, Stanford, United States	Hard	(United States) Raquel Kops-Jones	(Germany) Julia Görges (Croatia) Darija Jurak	6–2, 7–6^{(7–4)}
Win	12.	Aug 2013	Southern California Open, Carlsbad, United States	Hard	(United States) Raquel Kops-Jones	(Chinese Taipei) Chan Hao-ching (Slovakia) Janette Husárová	6–4, 6–1
Loss	7.	Sep 2013	KDB Korea Open, Seoul	Hard	(United States) Raquel Kops-Jones	(Chinese Taipei) Chan Chin-wei (China) Xu Yifan	5–7, 3–6
Loss	8.	Feb 2014	Dubai Tennis Championships, United Arab Emirates	Hard	(United States) Raquel Kops-Jones	(Russia) Alla Kudryavtseva (Australia) Anastasia Rodionova	2–6, 7–5, [8–10]
Win	13.	Jun 2014	Aegon Classic, Birmingham	Grass	(United States) Raquel Kops-Jones	(Australia) Ashleigh Barty (Australia) Casey Dellacqua	7–6^{(7–1)}, 6–1
Win	14.	Aug 2014	Cincinnati Masters, United States	Hard	(United States) Raquel Kops-Jones	(Hungary) Tímea Babos (France) Kristina Mladenovic	6–1, 2–0 ret.
Loss	9.	Jan 2015	Apia International Sydney, Australia	Hard	(United States) Raquel Kops-Jones	(United States) Bethanie Mattek-Sands (India) Sania Mirza	3–6, 3–6
Win	15.	Feb 2015	Qatar Total Open, Doha	Hard	(United States) Raquel Kops-Jones	(Chinese Taipei) Hsieh Su-wei (India) Sania Mirza	6–4, 6–4
Win	16.	Jun 2015	Aegon Nottingham Open, Great Britain	Grass	(United States) Raquel Kops-Jones	(United Kingdom) Jocelyn Rae (United Kingdom) Anna Smith	3–6, 6–3, [11–9]
Win	17.	Oct 2015	Generali Ladies Linz, Austria	Hard	(United States) Raquel Kops-Jones	(Czech Republic) Andrea Hlaváčková (Czech Republic) Lucie Hradecká	6–3, 7–5
Win	18.	Jul 2016	Bank of the West Classic, Stanford	Hard	(United States) Raquel Atawo	(Croatia) Darija Jurak (Australia) Anastasia Rodionova	6–3, 6–4
Win	19.	Feb 2017	Qatar Total Open, Doha	Hard	(Slovenia) Katarina Srebotnik	(Ukraine) Olga Savchuk (Kazakhstan) Yaroslava Shvedova	6–3, 7–6^{(9–7)}
Loss	10.	Apr 2017	Porsche Tennis Grand Prix, Stuttgart, Germany	Clay (i)	(Slovenia) Katarina Srebotnik	(United States) Raquel Atawo (Latvia) Jeļena Ostapenko	4–6, 4–6
Win	20.	Aug 2017	Bank of the West Classic, Stanford	Hard	(United States) CoCo Vandeweghe	(France) Alizé Cornet (Poland) Alicja Rosolska	6–2, 6–3
Win	21.	Jun 2018	Nottingham Open, Great Britain	Grass	(Poland) Alicja Rosolska	(Romania) Mihaela Buzărnescu (United Kingdom) Heather Watson	6–3, 7–6^{(7–5)}

== Grand Slam performance timelines ==
Key
W	F	SF	QF	#R	RR	Q#	DNQ	A	NH

(W) winner; (F) finalist; (SF) semifinalist; (QF) quarterfinalist; (#R) rounds 4, 3, 2, 1; (RR) round-robin stage; (Q#) qualification round; (DNQ) did not qualify; (A) absent; (NH) not held; (SR) strike rate (events won / competed); (W–L) win–loss record.
To avoid confusion and double counting, these charts are updated at the conclusion of a tournament or when the player's participation has ended.

=== Singles ===
Tournament	2004	2005	SR	W–L
Grand Slam tournaments
Australian Open	A	3R	0 / 1	2–1
French Open	A	1R	0 / 1	0–1
Wimbledon	A	1R	0 / 1	0–1
US Open	1R	1R	0 / 2	0–2
Win–loss	0–1	2–4	0 / 5	2–5

=== Doubles ===
Tournament	1998	1999	2000	2001	2002	2003	2004	2005	2006	2007	2008	2009	2010	2011	2012	2013	2014	2015	2016	2017	2018	2019	SR	W–L
Grand Slam tournaments
Australian Open	A	A	A	A	2R	1R	1R	1R	1R	A	A	2R	1R	3R	1R	2R	SF	QF	2R	1R	2R	2R	0 / 16	15–16
French Open	A	A	A	A	1R	2R	3R	A	A	A	A	1R	1R	1R	2R	1R	2R	1R	2R	2R	1R	3R	0 / 14	9–14
Wimbledon	A	A	A	A	1R	1R	1R	3R	1R	A	3R	1R	1R	2R	QF	3R	3R	SF	SF	1R	SF	3R	0 / 17	26–17
US Open	1R	1R	A	1R	2R	2R	1R	1R	1R	1R	QF	1R	1R	1R	3R	2R	1R	3R	1R	1R	1R	2R	0 / 21	11–21
Win–loss	0–1	0–1	0–0	0–1	2–4	2–4	2–4	2–3	0–3	0–1	5–2	1–4	0–4	3–4	6–4	4–4	7–4	9–4	6–4	1–4	5–4	6–4	0 / 68	61–68
WTA Premier Mandatory tournaments
Indian Wells	A	A	A	A	A	1R	1R	2R	A	A	A	2R	2R	2R	1R	1R	2R	1R	QF	1R	1R	2R	0 / 14	8–14
Miami	A	A	A	A	A	A	A	Q2	A	A	A	QF	2R	1R	1R	1R	SF	1R	1R	1R	1R	QF	0 / 11	8–11
Madrid	Not Held											1R	1R	1R	1R	QF	QF	2R	1R	1R	QF	1R	0 / 11	7–11
Beijing	Not Held		Not Tier I									A	A	QF	QF	QF	QF	1R	1R	1R	QF	1R	0 / 9	10–9
