= 2010 Aegon Classic – Singles =

Singles
- 2010 Aegon Classic

Final
- Champion: (China) Li Na
- Runner-up: (Russia) Maria Sharapova
- Score: 7–5, 6–1

Details
- Draw: 56 (8 Q / 5 WC )
- Seeds: 16

Events
Singles	Doubles
← 2009 ·	Birmingham Classic	· 2011 →

Magdaléna Rybáriková was the defending champion, but lost in the third round to Sesil Karatantcheva.

Li Na won the title defeating Maria Sharapova in the final 7–5, 6–1. This was the only title Li won on grass throughout her career.

== Seeds ==
The top eight seeds receive a bye into the second round.

1. (China) Li Na (champion)
2. (Russia) Maria Sharapova (final)
3. (Belgium) Yanina Wickmayer (quarterfinalist)
4. (France) Aravane Rezaï (semifinalist)
5. (Italy) Sara Errani (quarterfinalist)
6. (Kazakhstan) Yaroslava Shvedova (second round)
7. (Belarus) Olga Govortsova (second round)
8. (Germany) Andrea Petkovic (second round)
9. (Canada) Aleksandra Wozniak (second round)
10. (Slovakia) Magdaléna Rybáriková (third round)
11. (Hungary) Melinda Czink (first round)
12. (United Kingdom) Elena Baltacha (first round, retired due to illness)
13. (Germany) Angelique Kerber (third round)
14. (Thailand) Tamarine Tanasugarn (third round)
15. (Germany) Kristina Barrois (first round)
16. (United States) Vania King (second round)

== Draw ==
=== Key ===
- Q = Qualifier
- WC = Wild card
- LL = Lucky loser
- Alt = Alternate
- ITF = ITF entry
- PR = Protected ranking
- SR = Special ranking
- SE = Special exempt
- JE = Junior exempt
- JR = Junior Accelerator Programme entrant
- CO = College Accelerator Programme entrant
- NG = Next Gen Accelerator Program entrant
- w/o = Walkover
- r = Retired
- d = Defaulted

=== Finals ===
Quarterfinals
1/WC	(China) Li Na	6	6
Q	(Estonia) Kaia Kanepi	4	2
4	(France) Aravane Rezaï	7	7
5	(Italy) Sara Errani	6^{2}	5
Q	(United States) Alison Riske	6^{5}	6	6
3	(Belgium) Yanina Wickmayer	7	4	3
Q	(Kazakhstan) Sesil Karatantcheva	2	4
2	(Russia) Maria Sharapova	6	6

Semifinals
1/WC	(China) Li Na	6	3	6
4	(France) Aravane Rezaï	1	6	3
Q	(United States) Alison Riske	2	6	1
2	(Russia) Maria Sharapova	6	4	6

Final
1/WC	(China) Li Na	7	6
2	(Russia) Maria Sharapova	5	1

=== Top half ===
==== Section 1 ====
First round
(France) P Parmentier	6	5	5
WC	(United Kingdom) A Keothavong	4	7	7
(Japan) A Morita	6	3	6
(Italy) ME Camerin	2	6	2
Q	(Japan) M Doi	3	6	3
13	(Germany) A Kerber	6	3	6
12	(United Kingdom) E Baltacha	1	r
Q	(Estonia) K Kanepi	6
(France) J Coin	6^{4}	6	3
(Australia) J Groth	7	2	6
Q	(Belarus) E Dzehalevich	2	6	3
(Portugal) M Larcher de Brito	6	4	6

Second round
1/WC	(China) N Li	6	6
WC	(United Kingdom) A Keothavong	2	4
(Japan) A Morita	1	6^{7}
13	(Germany) A Kerber	6	7
Q	(Estonia) K Kanepi	7	7
(Australia) J Groth	6^{5}	5
(Portugal) M Larcher de Brito	6	4	7
7	(Belarus) O Govortsova	1	6	5

Third round
1/WC	(China) N Li	4	6	7
13	(Germany) A Kerber	6	3	5
Q	(Estonia) K Kanepi	6	6
(Portugal) M Larcher de Brito	2	2

Quarterfinals
1/WC	(China) N Li	6	6
Q	(Estonia) K Kanepi	4	2

==== Section 2 ====
First round
Q	(Netherlands) M Krajicek	3	3
(Australia) A Rodionova	6	6
(Colombia) M Duque Mariño	1	2
Q	(Croatia) M Lučić	6	6
(Croatia) K Šprem	5	7	7
15	(Germany) K Barrois	7	6^{5}	6^{4}
11	(Hungary) M Czink	5	4
PR	(New Zealand) M Erakovic	7	6
LL	(Australia) S Ferguson	5	6	6^{3}
(United States) J Craybas	7	4	7
(United States) S Perry	6	6
WC	(United Kingdom) N Broady	4	4

Second round
4	(France) A Rezaï	6	6
(Australia) A Rodionova	3	4
Q	(Croatia) M Lučić	6	5	7
(Croatia) K Šprem	3	7	6^{3}
PR	(New Zealand) M Erakovic	3	6	6
(United States) J Craybas	6	4	4
(United States) S Perry	2	6	1
5	(Italy) S Errani	6	4	6

Third round
4	(France) A Rezaï	7	6
Q	(Croatia) M Lučić	5	3
PR	(New Zealand) M Erakovic	6^{5}	4
5	(Italy) S Errani	7	6

Quarterfinals
4	(France) A Rezaï	7	7
5	(Italy) S Errani	6^{2}	5

=== Bottom half ===
==== Section 3 ====
First round
(Russia) A Chakvetadze	3	6	6
WC	(United Kingdom) M South	6	4	4
Q	(United States) A Riske	7	4	6
(Czech Republic) S Záhlavová	6^{5}	6	0
(Australia) A Molik	5	1
9	(Canada) A Wozniak	7	6
14	(Thailand) T Tanasugarn	6	6
(United States) L Osterloh	2	2
(Chinese Taipei) Y-j Chan	1	4
(India) S Mirza	6	6
Q	(United Kingdom) L Robson	6	0
(Switzerland) S Vögele	4	1	r

Second round
8	(Germany) A Petkovic	4	4
(Russia) A Chakvetadze	6	6
Q	(United States) A Riske	6	6
9	(Canada) A Wozniak	2	4
14	(Thailand) T Tanasugarn	4	7	6
(India) S Mirza	6	5	1
Q	(United Kingdom) L Robson	5	4
3	(Belgium) Y Wickmayer	7	6

Third round
(Russia) A Chakvetadze	6	5	1
Q	(United States) A Riske	4	7	6
14	(Thailand) T Tanasugarn	4	4
3	(Belgium) Y Wickmayer	6	6

Quarterfinals
Q	(United States) A Riske	6^{5}	6	6
3	(Belgium) Y Wickmayer	7	4	3

==== Section 4 ====
First round
Q	(Kazakhstan) S Karatantcheva	6	6
(United Kingdom) K O'Brien	3	4
(Chinese Taipei) K-c Chang	3	3
(Russia) E Makarova	6	6
(Russia) R Kulikova	7	2	r
10	(Slovakia) M Rybáriková	5	3
16	(United States) V King	6	6
(Belgium) K Flipkens	4	0
(Russia) A Kudryavtseva	6	6
WC	(United Kingdom) H Watson	4	3
(Italy) A Brianti	6	4	2
(United States) B Mattek-Sands	4	6	6

Second round
6	(Kazakhstan) Y Shvedova	4	4
Q	(Kazakhstan) S Karatantcheva	6	6
(Russia) E Makarova	5	6	6^{5}
10	(Slovakia) M Rybáriková	7	4	7
16	(United States) V King	1	2
(Russia) A Kudryavtseva	6	6
(United States) B Mattek-Sands	0	3
2	(Russia) M Sharapova	6	6

Third round
Q	(Kazakhstan) S Karatantcheva	6	6^{3}	6
10	(Slovakia) M Rybáriková	2	7	2
(Russia) A Kudryavtseva	3	1
2	(Russia) M Sharapova	6	6

Quarterfinals
Q	(Kazakhstan) S Karatantcheva	2	4
2	(Russia) M Sharapova	6	6
