= 2010 Aegon Classic – Doubles =

Doubles
- 2010 Aegon Classic

Final
- Champions: (Zimbabwe) Cara Black (United States) Lisa Raymond
- Runners-up: (United States) Liezel Huber (United States) Bethanie Mattek-Sands
- Score: 6–3, 3–2 ret.

Events
Singles	Doubles
← 2009 ·	Birmingham Classic	· 2011 →

Cara Black and Liezel Huber were the two-time defending champions but did not compete together. Black partnered up with Lisa Raymond and Huber with Bethanie Mattek-Sands. Black and Raymond won in the final after Huber and Mattek-Sands retired.

== Seeds ==
1. (United States) Liezel Huber / (United States) Bethanie Mattek-Sands (final, retired)
2. (Zimbabwe) Cara Black / (United States) Lisa Raymond (champions)
3. (Chinese Taipei) Hsieh Su-wei / (Russia) Alla Kudryavtseva (quarterfinals)
4. (Chinese Taipei) Chuang Chia-Jung / (Belarus) Olga Govortsova (quarterfinals)

== Draw ==
=== Key ===
- Q = Qualifier
- WC = Wild card
- LL = Lucky loser
- Alt = Alternate
- SE = Special exempt
- PR = Protected ranking
- ITF = ITF entry
- JE = Junior exempt
- w/o = Walkover
- r = Retired
- d = Defaulted
- SR = Special ranking

=== Draw ===
First round
1	(United States) L Huber (United States) B Mattek-Sands	6	6
WC	(United Kingdom) L Robson (United Kingdom) H Watson	4	4
WC	(United Kingdom) A Keothavong (United Kingdom) M South	6^{3}	3
(Canada) M-È Pelletier (Turkey) İ Şenoğlu	7^{7}	6
3	(Chinese Taipei) S-W Hsieh (Russia) A Kudryavtseva	6	6
(Belarus) E Dzehalevich (Belarus) T Poutchek	1	4
(Hungary) M Czink (Italy) S Errani	6^{1}	3
(United States) V King (Kazakhstan) Y Shvedova	7^{7}	6
(South Africa) N Grandin (United States) A Spears	6	6
(Russia) M Kondratieva (Czech Republic) V Uhlířová	1	2
(United States) J Ditty (Ukraine) O Savchuk	3	3
4	(Chinese Taipei) C-J Chuang (Belarus) O Govortsova	6	6
(United Kingdom) S Borwell (United States) R Kops-Jones	6	4	[6]
(Australia) An Rodionova (Russia) Ar Rodionova	1	6	[10]
Alt	(New Zealand) M Erakovic (Thailand) T Tanasugarn	7^{7}	5	[5]
2	(Zimbabwe) C Black (United States) L Raymond	6^{3}	7	[10]

Quarterfinals
1	(United States) L Huber (United States) B Mattek-Sands	6	6
(Canada) M-È Pelletier (Turkey) İ Şenoğlu	1	1
3	(Chinese Taipei) S-W Hsieh (Russia) A Kudryavtseva	6	2	[8]
(United States) V King (Kazakhstan) Y Shvedova	2	6	[10]
(South Africa) N Grandin (United States) A Spears	7	3	[10]
4	(Chinese Taipei) C-J Chuang (Belarus) O Govortsova	5	6	[6]
(Australia) An Rodionova (Russia) Ar Rodionova	3	2
2	(Zimbabwe) C Black (United States) L Raymond	6	6

Semifinals
1	(United States) L Huber (United States) B Mattek-Sands	6	6
(United States) V King (Kazakhstan) Y Shvedova	4	0
(South Africa) N Grandin (United States) A Spears	4	4
2	(Zimbabwe) C Black (United States) L Raymond	6	6

Finals
1	(United States) L Huber (United States) B Mattek-Sands	3	2	r
2	(Zimbabwe) C Black (United States) L Raymond	6	3
