= 2011 Aegon Classic – Singles =

Singles
- 2011 Aegon Classic

Final
- Champion: (Germany) Sabine Lisicki
- Runner-up: (Slovakia) Daniela Hantuchová
- Score: 6–3, 6–2

Details
- Draw: 56 (8 Q / 4 WC )
- Seeds: 16

Events
| Singles | Doubles |
| ← 2010 · | Birmingham Classic | · 2012 → |

Li Na was the defending champion, but chose not to compete after winning the French Open singles title the previous week.

Sabine Lisicki won the title, defeating Daniela Hantuchová in the final 6–3, 6–2.

== Seeds ==
The top eight seeds received a bye into the second round.

1. (Estonia) Kaia Kanepi (second round)
2. (Serbia) Ana Ivanovic (semifinals)
3. (China) Peng Shuai (semifinals)
4. (Slovakia) Daniela Hantuchová (final)
5. (Italy) Roberta Vinci (second round)
6. (Russia) Ekaterina Makarova (second round)
7. (Italy) Sara Errani (third round)
8. (France) Aravane Rezaï (third round)
9. (Japan) Ayumi Morita (second round)
10. (Serbia) Bojana Jovanovski (first round)
11. (Kazakhstan) Yaroslava Shvedova (second round)
12. (Japan) Kimiko Date-Krumm (first round)
13. (Canada) Rebecca Marino (third round)
14. (Slovakia) Magdaléna Rybáriková (quarterfinals)
15. (South Africa) Chanelle Scheepers (first round)
16. (Russia) Alla Kudryavtseva (third round)

== Draw ==
=== Key ===
- Q = Qualifier
- WC = Wild card
- LL = Lucky loser
- Alt = Alternate
- ITF = ITF entry
- PR = Protected ranking
- SR = Special ranking
- SE = Special exempt
- JE = Junior exempt
- JR = Junior Accelerator Programme entrant
- CO = College Accelerator Programme entrant
- NG = Next Gen Accelerator Program entrant
- w/o = Walkover
- r = Retired
- d = Defaulted

=== Finals ===
Quarterfinals
14 | (Slovakia) Magdaléna Rybáriková | 6^{1} | 4
(Germany) Sabine Lisicki | 7^{7} | 6
3 | (China) Peng Shuai | 6 | 4 | 6
(New Zealand) Marina Erakovic | 4 | 6 | 3
(United States) Alison Riske | 2 | 4
4 | (Slovakia) Daniela Hantuchová | 6 | 6
(Croatia) Mirjana Lučić | 3 | 4
2/WC | (Serbia) Ana Ivanovic | 6 | 6

Semifinals
(Germany) Sabine Lisicki | 6 | 6
3 | (China) Peng Shuai | 3 | 1
4 | (Slovakia) Daniela Hantuchová | 6^{2} | 6 | 6
2/WC | (Serbia) Ana Ivanovic | 7^{7} | 3 | 2

Final
(Germany) Sabine Lisicki | 6 | 6
4 | (Slovakia) Daniela Hantuchová | 3 | 2

=== Top half ===
==== Section 1 ====
First round
(France) V Razzano | 4 | 4
Q | (Russia) Ar Rodionova | 6 | 6
Q | (Japan) S Aoyama | 2 | 1
(United States) C Vandeweghe | 6 | 6
WC | (United Kingdom) E Webley-Smith | 4 | 3
14 | (Slovakia) M Rybáriková | 6 | 6
12 | (Japan) K Date-Krumm | 4 | 6^{3}
(Germany) S Lisicki | 6 | 7^{7}
(Belgium) K Flipkens | 6 | 6
(Thailand) N Lertcheewakarn | 1 | 2
(India) S Mirza | 3 | 6 | 2
(Austria) T Paszek | 6 | 4 | 6

Second round
1 | (Estonia) K Kanepi | 4 | 2
Q | (Russia) Ar Rodionova | 6 | 6
(United States) C Vandeweghe | 2 | 1
14 | (Slovakia) M Rybáriková | 6 | 6
(Germany) S Lisicki | 7 | 7^{7}
(Belgium) K Flipkens | 5 | 6^{3}
(Austria) T Paszek | 6 | 3 | 6
6 | (Russia) E Makarova | 4 | 6 | 4

Third round
Q | (Russia) Ar Rodionova | 7^{7} | 0 | 1
14 | (Slovakia) M Rybáriková | 6^{1} | 6 | 6
(Germany) S Lisicki | 7^{7} | 6
(Austria) T Paszek | 6^{1} | 4

Quarterfinals
14 | (Slovakia) M Rybáriková | 6^{1} | 4
(Germany) S Lisicki | 7^{7} | 6

==== Section 2 ====
First round
Q | (United Kingdom) N Broady | 6 | 6^{5} | 6
(France) C Garcia | 2 | 7^{7} | 4
(Japan) M Doi | 6 | 6
(Romania) E Gallovits-Hall | 4 | 2
(United Kingdom) H Watson | 6 | 7
15 | (South Africa) C Scheepers | 3 | 5
11 | (Kazakhstan) Y Shvedova | 6 | 7^{7}
(China) J Zheng | 2 | 6^{5}
(New Zealand) M Erakovic | 6 | 6
(Spain) A Parra Santonja | 4 | 4
(United States) C McHale | 3 | 7^{9} | 6
(Australia) An Rodionova | 6 | 6^{7} | 2

Second round
3 | (China) S Peng | 6 | 6^{5} | 7^{7}
Q | (United Kingdom) N Broady | 2 | 7^{7} | 6^{2}
(Japan) M Doi | 2 | 4
(United Kingdom) H Watson | 6 | 6
11 | (Kazakhstan) Y Shvedova | 6^{7} | 5
(New Zealand) M Erakovic | 7^{9} | 7
(United States) C McHale | 6^{5} | 6 | 2
7 | (Italy) S Errani | 7^{7} | 4 | 6

Third round
3 | (China) S Peng | 7^{7} | 6
(United Kingdom) H Watson | 6^{1} | 1
(New Zealand) M Erakovic | 5 | 6 | 6
7 | (Italy) S Errani | 7 | 4 | 3

Quarterfinals
3 | (China) S Peng | 6 | 4 | 6
(New Zealand) M Erakovic | 4 | 6 | 3

=== Bottom half ===
==== Section 3 ====
First round
(Belarus) O Govortsova | 6 | 2 | 6
(Italy) R Oprandi | 2 | 6 | 4
(United States) A Riske | 4 | 6 | 6
(Poland) U Radwańska | 6 | 2 | 3
Q | (Germany) S Gronert | 6 | 5 | 6
10 | (Serbia) B Jovanovski | 1 | 7 | 4
16 | (Russia) A Kudryavtseva | 7^{7} | 6
(France) A Cornet | 6^{2} | 1
(Czech Republic) S Záhlavová | 5 | 6^{5}
(Australia) C Dellacqua | 7 | 7^{7}
(Chinese Taipei) K-c Chang | 3 | 3
(Romania) S Cîrstea | 6 | 6

Second round
8 | (France) A Rezaï | 7 | 0
(Belarus) O Govortsova | 5 | 0^{r}
(United States) A Riske | 6 | 6
Q | (Germany) S Gronert | 3 | 4
16 | (Russia) A Kudryavtseva | 7 | 3 | 6
(Australia) C Dellacqua | 5 | 6 | 4
(Romania) S Cîrstea | 0 | 3
4 | (Slovakia) D Hantuchová | 6 | 6

Third round
8 | (France) A Rezaï | 5 | 7^{8} | 2
(United States) A Riske | 7 | 6^{6} | 6
16 | (Russia) A Kudryavtseva | 4 | 2
4 | (Slovakia) D Hantuchová | 6 | 6

Quarterfinals
(United States) A Riske | 2 | 4
4 | (Slovakia) D Hantuchová | 6 | 6

==== Section 4 ====
First round
(Croatia) M Lučić | 6 | 7^{9}
Q | (United States) A Stevenson | 3 | 6^{7}
(United States) J Craybas | 3 | 1
(Czech Republic) A Hlaváčková | 6 | 6
Q | (Croatia) A Tomljanović | 3 | 6 | 6^{4}
9 | (Japan) A Morita | 6 | 3 | 7^{7}
13 | (Canada) R Marino | 6 | 6
WC | (United Kingdom) M South | 4 | 1
Q | (Japan) R Fujiwara | 6 | 7
Q | (Switzerland) C Perrin | 2 | 5
WC | (United Kingdom) S Murray | 5 | 1
(Georgia (country)) A Tatishvili | 7 | 6

Second round
5 | (Italy) R Vinci | 7^{7} | 6^{4} | 5
(Croatia) M Lučić | 6^{2} | 7^{7} | 7
(Czech Republic) A Hlaváčková | 7^{7} | 6
9 | (Japan) A Morita | 6^{2} | 2
13 | (Canada) R Marino | 6 | 6
Q | (Japan) R Fujiwara | 1 | 2
(Georgia (country)) A Tatishvili | 1 | 0
2/WC | (Serbia) A Ivanovic | 6 | 6

Third round
(Croatia) M Lučić | 6 | 7^{7}
(Czech Republic) A Hlaváčková | 2 | 6^{4}
13 | (Canada) R Marino | 3 | 2
2/WC | (Serbia) A Ivanovic | 6 | 6

Quarterfinals
(Croatia) M Lučić | 3 | 4
2/WC | (Serbia) A Ivanovic | 6 | 6

== Qualifying ==
=== Seeds ===
1. (Chinese Taipei) Chan Yung-jan (qualifying competition)
2. (United States) Sloane Stephens (qualifying competition)
3. (Portugal) Michelle Larcher de Brito (qualifying competition; retired)
4. (Kazakhstan) Sesil Karatantcheva (qualifying competition)
5. (Croatia) Ajla Tomljanović (qualifier)
6. (Israel) Julia Glushko (qualifying competition)
7. (Russia) Arina Rodionova (qualifier)
8. (United States) Lindsay Lee-Waters (qualifying competition)
9. (Japan) Rika Fujiwara (qualifier)
10. (United States) Gail Brodsky (qualifying competition)
11. (United States) Alexandra Stevenson (qualifier)
12. (United Kingdom) Naomi Broady (qualifier)
13. (Germany) Sarah Gronert (qualifier)
14. (Switzerland) Conny Perrin (qualifier)
15. (United States) Abigail Spears (qualifying competition)
16. (Japan) Shuko Aoyama (qualifier)

=== Qualifiers ===
1. (Japan) Rika Fujiwara
2. (United Kingdom) Naomi Broady
3. (Germany) Sarah Gronert
4. (Switzerland) Conny Perrin
5. (Croatia) Ajla Tomljanović
6. (United States) Alexandra Stevenson
7. (Russia) Arina Rodionova
8. (Japan) Shuko Aoyama

=== Draw ===
==== First qualifier ====
| Qualifying competition |
| 1 | (Chinese Taipei) Chan Yung-jan | 6 | 6^{5} | 2 |
| 9 | (Japan) Rika Fujiwara | 3 | 7 | 6 |

==== Second qualifier ====
First round
2 | (United States) Sloane Stephens
BYE
WC | (United States) Raquel Kops-Jones | 3 | 3
12 | (United Kingdom) Naomi Broady | 6 | 6

Qualifying competition
2 | (United States) Sloane Stephens | 1 | 4
12 | (United Kingdom) Naomi Broady | 6 | 6

==== Third qualifier ====
First round
3 | (Portugal) Michelle Larcher de Brito
BYE
WC | (United Kingdom) Lottie Fox | 3 | 1
13 | (Germany) Sarah Gronert | 6 | 6

Qualifying competition
3 | (Portugal) Michelle Larcher de Brito | 1^{r}
13 | (Germany) Sarah Gronert | 1

==== Fourth qualifier ====
First round
4 | (Kazakhstan) Sesil Karatantcheva
BYE
WC | (United Kingdom) Natasha Starling | 1 | 2
14 | (Switzerland) Conny Perrin | 6 | 6

Qualifying competition
4 | (Kazakhstan) Sesil Karatantcheva | 5 | 7^{7} | 3
14 | (Switzerland) Conny Perrin | 7 | 6^{4} | 6

==== Fifth qualifier ====
First round
5 | (Croatia) Ajla Tomljanović
BYE
WC | (Czech Republic) Vladimíra Uhlířová | 2 | 1
15/WC | (United States) Abigail Spears | 6 | 6

Qualifying competition
5 | (Croatia) Ajla Tomljanović | 6^{4} | 6 | 6
15/WC | (United States) Abigail Spears | 7^{7} | 3 | 4

==== Sixth qualifier ====
| Qualifying competition |
| 6 | (Israel) Julia Glushko | 1 | 2 |
| 11 | (United States) Alexandra Stevenson | 6 | 6 |

==== Seventh qualifier ====
| Qualifying competition |
| 7 | (Russia) Arina Rodionova | 7 | 4 | 7 |
| 10 | (United States) Gail Brodsky | 6^{5} | 6 | 6^{5} |

==== Eighth qualifier ====
First round
8 | (United States) Lindsay Lee-Waters
BYE
(South Africa) Natalie Grandin | 3 | 7 | 3
16 | (Japan) Shuko Aoyama | 6 | 5 | 6

Qualifying competition
8 | (United States) Lindsay Lee-Waters | 7^{7} | 3 | 6^{4}
16 | (Japan) Shuko Aoyama | 6^{3} | 6 | 7^{7}
