= 2011 Aegon Classic – Doubles =

Doubles
- 2011 Aegon Classic

Final
- Champions: (Belarus) Olga Govortsova (Russia) Alla Kudryavtseva
- Runners-up: (Italy) Sara Errani (Italy) Roberta Vinci
- Score: 1–6, 6–1, [10–5]

Events
Singles	Doubles
← 2010 ·	Birmingham Classic	· 2012 →

Cara Black and Lisa Raymond were the defending champions, but only Raymond decided to compete in 2011. She partnered up with Liezel Huber, but they were eliminated in the semifinals by Sara Errani and Roberta Vinci.

Olga Govortsova and Alla Kudryavtseva defeated Errani and Vinci in the final 1–6, 6–1, [10–5].

== Seeds ==
1. (United States) Liezel Huber / (United States) Lisa Raymond (semifinals)
2. (Belarus) Olga Govortsova / (Russia) Alla Kudryavtseva (champions)
3. (Italy) Sara Errani / (Italy) Roberta Vinci (final)
4. (South Africa) Natalie Grandin / (Czech Republic) Vladimíra Uhlířová (first round)

== Draw ==
=== Key ===
- Q = Qualifier
- WC = Wild card
- LL = Lucky loser
- Alt = Alternate
- SE = Special exempt
- PR = Protected ranking
- ITF = ITF entry
- JE = Junior exempt
- w/o = Walkover
- r = Retired
- d = Defaulted
- SR = Special ranking

First round
1	(United States) L Huber (United States) L Raymond	6	6
(Poland) U Radwańska (Russia) Ar Rodionova	2	4
(United States) R Kops-Jones (United States) A Spears	5	4
(Chinese Taipei) K-c Chang (Chinese Taipei) C-j Chuang	7	6
3	(Italy) S Errani (Italy) R Vinci	w/o
WC	(Serbia) A Ivanovic (Austria) T Paszek
(Japan) S Aoyama (Japan) R Fujiwara	6	7^{8}
(Poland) K Jans (Poland) A Rosolska	3	6^{6}
(Estonia) K Kanepi (Slovakia) M Rybáriková	7	3	[9]
(Romania) S Cîrstea (New Zealand) M Erakovic	5	6	[11]
(Australia) C Dellacqua (South Africa) C Scheepers	7^{9}	4	[10]
4	(South Africa) N Grandin (Czech Republic) V Uhlířová	6^{7}	6	[8]
(United States) L Lee-Waters (United States) M Moulton-Levy	4	4
(Thailand) N Lertcheewakarn (Georgia (country)) A Tatishvili	6	6
WC	(United Kingdom) J Rae (United Kingdom) H Watson	4	6^{4}
2	(Belarus) O Govortsova (Russia) A Kudryavtseva	6	7^{7}

Quarterfinals
1	(United States) L Huber (United States) L Raymond	6	7^{7}
(Chinese Taipei) K-c Chang (Chinese Taipei) C-j Chuang	4	6^{5}
3	(Italy) S Errani (Italy) R Vinci	6	4	[10]
(Japan) S Aoyama (Japan) R Fujiwara	4	6	[6]
(Romania) S Cîrstea (New Zealand) M Erakovic	1	6	[9]
(Australia) C Dellacqua (South Africa) C Scheepers	6	4	[11]
(Thailand) N Lertcheewakarn (Georgia (country)) A Tatishvili	3	3
2	(Belarus) O Govortsova (Russia) A Kudryavtseva	6	6

Semifinals
1	(United States) L Huber (United States) L Raymond	6	6^{5}	[8]
3	(Italy) S Errani (Italy) R Vinci	1	7^{7}	[10]
(Australia) C Dellacqua (South Africa) C Scheepers	5	6	[2]
2	(Belarus) O Govortsova (Russia) A Kudryavtseva	7	4	[10]

Final
3	(Italy) S Errani (Italy) R Vinci	6	1	[5]
2	(Belarus) O Govortsova (Russia) A Kudryavtseva	1	6	[10]
