= 2010 Aegon Classic =

- Date: 7–13 June
- Edition: 29th
- Category: WTA International
- Draw: 56S / 16D
- Prize money: $220,000
- Surface: Grass / outdoor
- Location: Birmingham, United Kingdom
- Venue: Edgbaston Priory Club

Champions

Singles
- (China) Li Na

Doubles
- (Zimbabwe) Cara Black / (United States) Lisa Raymond
← 2009 ·	Birmingham Classic	· 2011 →

The 2010 Aegon Classic was a women's tennis tournament played on outdoor grass courts. It was the 29th edition of the event. It took place at the Edgbaston Priory Club in Birmingham, United Kingdom from 7 June until 13 June 2010. First-seeded Li Na won the singles title.

== Finals ==
=== Singles ===
(China) Li Na defeated (Russia) Maria Sharapova 7–5, 6–1

- It was Li's first title of the year and 3rd of her career.

=== Doubles ===
(Zimbabwe) Cara Black / (United States) Lisa Raymond defeated (United States) Liezel Huber / (United States) Bethanie Mattek-Sands 6–3, 3–2, RET

== Entrants ==
=== Seeds ===
Athlete	Nationality	Ranking*	Seeding
Li Na	China	12	1
Maria Sharapova	Russia	13	2
Yanina Wickmayer	Belgium	16	3
Aravane Rezaï	France	19	4
Sara Errani	Italy	33	5
Yaroslava Shvedova	Kazakhstan	36	6
Olga Govortsova	Belarus	38	7
Andrea Petkovic	Germany	41	8
Aleksandra Wozniak	Canada	48	9
Magdaléna Rybáriková	Slovakia	51	10
Melinda Czink	Hungary	58	11
Elena Baltacha	(United Kingdom) Great Britain	62	12
Angelique Kerber	Germany	64	13
Tamarine Tanasugarn	Thailand	66	14
Kristina Barrois	Germany	61	15
Vania King	United States	69	16

- Seedings are based on the rankings as of May 24, 2010.

=== Other entrants ===
The following players received wildcards into the main draw:

- (United Kingdom) Naomi Broady
- (United Kingdom) Anne Keothavong
- (United Kingdom) Melanie South
- (United Kingdom) Heather Watson

The following players received entry from the qualifying draw:

- (Japan) Misaki Doi
- (Belarus) Ekaterina Dzehalevich
- (Estonia) Kaia Kanepi
- (Kazakhstan) Sesil Karatantcheva
- (Netherlands) Michaëlla Krajicek
- (Croatia) Mirjana Lučić
- (United States) Alison Riske
- (United Kingdom) Laura Robson

The following player received a lucky loser spot:

- (Australia) Sophie Ferguson
