= 2012 Aegon Classic =

- Date: 11–17 June
- Edition: 31st
- Surface: Grass / outdoor
- Location: Birmingham, United Kingdom
- Venue: Edgbaston Priory Club

Champions

Singles
- (United States) Melanie Oudin

Doubles
- (Hungary) Tímea Babos / (Chinese Taipei) Hsieh Su-wei
← 2011 ·	Birmingham Classic	· 2013 →

The 2012 Aegon Classic was a women's tennis tournament played on outdoor grass courts. It was the 31st edition of the event. It took place at the Edgbaston Priory Club in Birmingham, United Kingdom, scheduled between 11 and 17 June 2012. Qualifier Melanie Oudin won the singles title.

== Singles main draw entrants ==
=== Seeds ===
Country	Player	Rank^{1}	Seed
ITA	Francesca Schiavone	12	1
GER	Sabine Lisicki	13	2
SVK	Daniela Hantuchová	18	3
ITA	Roberta Vinci	19	4
SRB	Jelena Janković	21	5
GER	Mona Barthel	32	6
USA	Christina McHale	36	7
RUS	Ekaterina Makarova	38	8
NZL	Marina Erakovic	42	9
ROU	Sorana Cîrstea	43	10
CZE	Iveta Benešová	51	11
AUT	Tamira Paszek	52	12
TPE	Hsieh Su-wei	64	13
HUN	Tímea Babos	67	14
GBR	Elena Baltacha	68	15
GRE	Eleni Daniilidou	69	16

- ^{1} Rankings are as of May 28, 2012

=== Other entrants ===
The following players received wildcards into the main draw:

- (Serbia) Jelena Janković
- (United Kingdom) Tara Moore
- (United Kingdom) Samantha Murray
- (Italy) Francesca Schiavone
- (United Kingdom) Melanie South

The following players received entry from the qualifying draw:

- (Russia) Vera Dushevina
- (Portugal) Michelle Larcher de Brito
- (Thailand) Noppawan Lertcheewakarn
- (United States) Grace Min
- (United States) Melanie Oudin
- (United States) Alison Riske
- (United States) Abigail Spears
- (China) Zheng Jie

The following players received entry via the Lucky loser spot:

- (Bulgaria) Sesil Karatantcheva
- (Russia) Alla Kudryavtseva

=== Withdrawals ===
- (Sweden) Sofia Arvidsson
- (Czech Republic) Petra Cetkovská
- (Romania) Simona Halep
- (Australia) Jarmila Gajdošová (left wrist injury)
- (Estonia) Kaia Kanepi
- (China) Peng Shuai
- (Ukraine) Lesia Tsurenko

=== Retirements ===
The following players retired from the singles main draw:

- (Australia) Casey Dellacqua
- (Netherlands) Michaëlla Krajicek (viral illness)
- (Japan) Ayumi Morita
- (France) Virginie Razzano

== Doubles main draw entrants ==
=== Seeds ===
Country	Player	Country	Player	Rank^{1}	Seed
USA	Liezel Huber	USA	Lisa Raymond	2	1
IND	Sania Mirza	KAZ	Yaroslava Shvedova	15	2
RSA	Natalie Grandin	CZE	Vladimíra Uhlířová	47	3
USA	Raquel Kops-Jones	USA	Abigail Spears	50	4

- ^{1} Rankings are as of May 28, 2012

=== Other entrants ===
The following pair received wildcard into the doubles main draw:

- (United Kingdom) Laura Robson / (United Kingdom) Heather Watson

The following pair received entry as alternates:

- (United Kingdom) Tara Moore / (United Kingdom) Melanie South

=== Withdrawals ===
- (Netherlands) Michaëlla Krajicek (viral illness)

=== Retirements ===
- (United Kingdom) Laura Robson (viral illness)
- (China) Zheng Jie (gastrointestinal illness)

== Finals ==
=== Singles ===
- (United States) Melanie Oudin defeated (Serbia) Jelena Janković, 6–4, 6–2
  - It is the first career title for Oudin

=== Doubles ===
- (Hungary) Tímea Babos / (Chinese Taipei) Hsieh Su-wei defeated (United States) Liezel Huber / (United States) Lisa Raymond, 7–5, 6–7^{(2–7)}, [10–8]
