= 2012 Aegon Classic – Singles =

Singles
- 2012 Aegon Classic

Final
- Champion: (United States) Melanie Oudin
- Runner-up: (Serbia) Jelena Janković
- Score: 6–4, 6–2

Details
- Draw: 56 (8 Q / 4 WC )
- Seeds: 16

Events
Singles	Doubles
← 2011 ·	Birmingham Classic	· 2013 →

Sabine Lisicki was the defending champion, but was defeated in the second round by Urszula Radwańska.

Melanie Oudin won her maiden and only WTA tour title, defeating Jelena Janković in the final 6–4, 6–2.

== Seeds ==
1. (Italy) Francesca Schiavone (second round)
2. (Germany) Sabine Lisicki (second round)
3. (Slovakia) Daniela Hantuchová (second round)
4. (Italy) Roberta Vinci (quarterfinals)
5. (Serbia) Jelena Janković (final)
6. (Germany) Mona Barthel (second round)
7. (United States) Christina McHale (second round)
8. (Russia) Ekaterina Makarova (semifinals)
9. (New Zealand) Marina Erakovic (third round)
10. (Romania) Sorana Cîrstea (first round)
11. (Czech Republic) Iveta Benešová (first round)
12. (Austria) Tamira Paszek (first round)
13. (Chinese Taipei) Hsieh Su-wei (quarterfinals)
14. (Hungary) Tímea Babos (second round)
15. (United Kingdom) Elena Baltacha (second round)
16. (Greece) Eleni Daniilidou (first round)

== Draw ==
=== Key ===
- Q = Qualifier
- WC = Wild card
- LL = Lucky loser
- Alt = Alternate
- ITF = ITF entry
- PR = Protected ranking
- SR = Special ranking
- SE = Special exempt
- JE = Junior exempt
- JR = Junior Accelerator Programme entrant
- CO = College Accelerator Programme entrant
- NG = Next Gen Accelerator Program entrant
- w/o = Walkover
- r = Retired
- d = Defaulted

=== Finals ===
Quarterfinals
(Japan) Misaki Doi	3	4
5/WC	(Serbia) Jelena Janković	6	6
4	(Italy) Roberta Vinci	3	7	4
Q	(China) Zheng Jie	6	5	6
8	(Russia) Ekaterina Makarova	3	6	6
13	(Chinese Taipei) Hsieh Su-wei	6	3	3
Q	(United States) Melanie Oudin	6	5	7
(United States) Irina Falconi	4	7	5

Semifinals
5/WC	(Serbia) Jelena Janković	6^{2}	7	6
Q	(China) Zheng Jie	7^{7}	5	1
8	(Russia) Ekaterina Makarova	4	6	2
Q	(United States) Melanie Oudin	6	3	6

Final
5/WC	(Serbia) Jelena Janković	4	2
Q	(United States) Melanie Oudin	6	6

=== Top half ===
==== Section one ====
First round
Q	(Thailand) N Lertcheewakarn	4	6	3
(Japan) M Doi	6	3	6
Q	(United States) A Spears	6^{3}	6	1
(Australia) A Rodionova	7^{7}	1	6
(France) S Foretz Gacon	6	6
16	(Greece) E Daniilidou	4	2
11	(Czech Republic) I Benešová	1	2
WC	(United Kingdom) T Moore	6	6
(Australia) C Dellacqua	6	3	6
(Spain) G Muguruza Blanco	2	6	2
(Croatia) M Lučić	1	6	3
WC	(United Kingdom) M South	6	4	6

Second round
1/WC	(Italy) F Schiavone	5	4
(Japan) M Doi	7	6
(Australia) A Rodionova	5	2
(France) S Foretz Gacon	7	6
WC	(United Kingdom) T Moore	6	4	1
(Australia) C Dellacqua	4	6	6
WC	(United Kingdom) M South	1	6^{3}
5/WC	(Serbia) J Janković	6	7^{7}

Third round
(Japan) M Doi	6	7
(France) S Foretz Gacon	4	5
(Australia) C Dellacqua
5/WC	(Serbia) J Janković	w/o

Quarterfinals
(Japan) M Doi	3	4
5/WC	(Serbia) J Janković	6	6

==== Section two ====
First round
(Italy) A Brianti	4	5
(France) V Razzano	6	7
(Argentina) P Ormaechea	4	6	3
(United Kingdom) H Watson	6	3	6
(Chinese Taipei) K-c Chang	6	4	5
15	(United Kingdom) E Baltacha	4	6	7
12	(Austria) T Paszek	2	5
(United Kingdom) A Keothavong	6	7
Q	(China) J Zheng	6	4	6
LL	(Russia) A Kudryavtseva	4	6	3
(Netherlands) M Krajicek	2	7^{8}	0^{r}
(Czech Republic) A Hlaváčková	6	6^{6}	4

Second round
4	(Italy) R Vinci	6
(France) V Razzano	3^{r}
(United Kingdom) H Watson	7^{7}	6
15	(United Kingdom) E Baltacha	6^{5}	3
(United Kingdom) A Keothavong	3	4
Q	(China) J Zheng	6	6
(Czech Republic) A Hlaváčková	7^{7}	6
6	(Germany) M Barthel	6^{5}	2

Third round
4	(Italy) R Vinci	6	4	6
(United Kingdom) H Watson	3	6	1
Q	(China) J Zheng	6	6
(Czech Republic) A Hlaváčková	4	1

Quarterfinals
4	(Italy) R Vinci	3	7	4
Q	(China) J Zheng	6	5	6

=== Bottom half ===
==== Section three ====
First round
(Thailand) T Tanasugarn	4	2
LL	(Kazakhstan) S Karatantcheva	6	6
(United Kingdom) L Robson	6	6
Q	(United States) G Min	4	1
(Japan) A Morita	0^{r}
9	(New Zealand) M Erakovic	5
13	(Chinese Taipei) S-w Hsieh	4	7^{7}	6
Q	(Russia) V Dushevina	6	6^{5}	4
(Russia) A Panova	6^{2}	6	7
(Canada) S Dubois	7^{7}	1	5
(Hungary) M Czink	7^{7}	3	6
(Georgia (country)) A Tatishvili	6^{5}	6	3

Second round
8	(Russia) E Makarova	7^{7}	6
LL	(Kazakhstan) S Karatantcheva	6^{4}	3
(United Kingdom) L Robson	4	6	4
9	(New Zealand) M Erakovic	6	3	6
13	(Chinese Taipei) S-w Hsieh	6	6
(Russia) A Panova	4	2
(Hungary) M Czink	7	7^{7}
3	(Slovakia) D Hantuchová	5	6^{5}

Third round
8	(Russia) E Makarova	2	6	6
9	(New Zealand) M Erakovic	6	1	3
13	(Chinese Taipei) S-w Hsieh	6	6
(Hungary) M Czink	1	2

Quarterfinals
8	(Russia) E Makarova	3	6	6
13	(Chinese Taipei) S-w Hsieh	6	3	3

==== Section four ====
First round
(Russia) E Vesnina	6	6
(Australia) O Rogowska	3	2
(Serbia) B Jovanovski	6	5	4
Q	(Portugal) M Larcher de Brito	3	7	6
Q	(United States) M Oudin	3	6	6
10	(Romania) S Cîrstea	6	3	2
14	(Hungary) T Babos	6	4	7^{7}
Q	(United States) A Riske	4	6	6^{2}
(United States) I Falconi	6	6
(Romania) A Cadanțu	2	0
WC	(United Kingdom) S Murray	4	4
(Poland) U Radwańska	6	6

Second round
7	(United States) C McHale	1	6	5
(Russia) E Vesnina	6	1	7
Q	(Portugal) M Larcher de Brito	3	4
Q	(United States) M Oudin	6	6
14	(Hungary) T Babos	0	4
(United States) I Falconi	6	6
(Poland) U Radwańska	6	6
2	(Germany) S Lisicki	3	4

Third round
(Russia) E Vesnina	0	2
Q	(United States) M Oudin	6	6
(United States) I Falconi	7	6
(Poland) U Radwańska	5	3

Quarterfinals
Q	(United States) M Oudin	6	5	7
(United States) I Falconi	4	7	5

== Qualifying ==
=== Seeds ===
Zheng and Dushevina would have made it to the main draw, however, they registered late. Zheng would have been 7th seed.

1. (China) Zheng Jie (qualified)
2. (Russia) Vera Dushevina (qualified)
3. (Kazakhstan) Sesil Karatantcheva (qualifying competition, lucky loser)
4. (Russia) Alla Kudryavtseva (qualifying competition, lucky loser)
5. (Japan) Kurumi Nara (qualifying competition)
6. (United States) Alison Riske (qualified)
7. (Portugal) Michelle Larcher de Brito (qualified)
8. (Netherlands) Bibiane Schoofs (first round)
9. (Chinese Taipei) Chan Yung-jan (qualifying competition)
10. (Thailand) Noppawan Lertcheewakarn (qualified)
11. (China) Zhang Shuai (qualifying competition)
12. (Poland) Sandra Zaniewska (qualifying competition)
13. (France) Victoria Larrière (first round)
14. (United States) Grace Min (qualified)
15. (United Kingdom) Naomi Broady (qualifying competition)
16. (United States) Gail Brodsky (qualifying competition)

=== Qualifiers ===
1. (China) Zheng Jie
2. (Russia) Vera Dushevina
3. (Thailand) Noppawan Lertcheewakarn
4. (United States) Abigail Spears
5. (United States) Grace Min
6. (United States) Alison Riske
7. (Portugal) Michelle Larcher de Brito
8. (United States) Melanie Oudin

=== Lucky loser ===
1. (Kazakhstan) Sesil Karatantcheva
2. (Russia) Alla Kudryavtseva

=== Draw ===
==== First qualifier ====
First round
1	(China) Zheng Jie	3	6	6
(South Africa) Natalie Grandin	6	1	2
(United States) Raquel Kops-Jones	1	6	1
12	(Poland) Sandra Zaniewska	6	4	6

Qualifying competition
1	(China) Zheng Jie	6	6
12	(Poland) Sandra Zaniewska	3	3

==== Second qualifier ====
First round
2	(Russia) Vera Dushevina	6	6
WC	(United Kingdom) Emma Devine	0	1
WC	(Australia) Karolina Wlodarczak	0	6	0^{r}
15	(United Kingdom) Naomi Broady	6	3	2

Qualifying competition
2	(Russia) Vera Dushevina	7	6^{1}	6
15	(United Kingdom) Naomi Broady	5	7^{7}	1

==== Third qualifier ====
First round
3	(Kazakhstan) Sesil Karatantcheva	6	6
WC	(United Kingdom) Francesca Stephenson	1	1
WC	(United States) Lindsay Lee-Waters	6	6^{3}	2
10	(Thailand) Noppawan Lertcheewakarn	3	7	6

Qualifying competition
3	(Kazakhstan) Sesil Karatantcheva	6^{11}	4
10	(Thailand) Noppawan Lertcheewakarn	7^{13}	6

==== Fourth qualifier ====
First round
4	(Russia) Alla Kudryavtseva	6	6
WC	(United Kingdom) Jessica Ren	2	4
(United States) Abigail Spears	6	6
13	(France) Victoria Larrière	0	3

Qualifying competition
4	(Russia) Alla Kudryavtseva	6	1	4
(United States) Abigail Spears	4	6	6

==== Fifth qualifier ====
First round
5	(Japan) Kurumi Nara	6	6
WC	(United Kingdom) Daneika Borthwick	2	2
(Poland) Alicja Rosolska	1	3
14	(United States) Grace Min	6	6

Qualifying competition
5	(Japan) Kurumi Nara	3	3
14	(United States) Grace Min	6	6

==== Sixth qualifier ====
First round
6	(United States) Alison Riske	6	6
(Czech Republic) Vladimíra Uhlířová	2	0
(Australia) Daniella Jeflea	4	2
11	(China) Zhang Shuai	6	6

Qualifying competition
6	(United States) Alison Riske	6	6
11	(China) Zhang Shuai	4	2

==== Seventh qualifier ====
First round
7	(Portugal) Michelle Larcher de Brito	6	6
WC	(Latvia) Līga Dekmeijere	3	2
(United Kingdom) Emily Webley-Smith	6	3	6^{4}
9	(Chinese Taipei) Chan Yung-jan	4	6	7^{7}

Qualifying competition
7	(Portugal) Michelle Larcher de Brito	6	6
9	(Chinese Taipei) Chan Yung-jan	2	2

==== Eighth qualifier ====
First round
8	(Netherlands) Bibiane Schoofs	4	6^{8}
(United States) Melanie Oudin	6	7^{10}
WC	(United Kingdom) Sabrina Bamburac	0	4
16	(United States) Gail Brodsky	6	6

Qualifying competition
(United States) Melanie Oudin	6	6
16	(United States) Gail Brodsky	4	0
