= 2011 Aegon Classic =

- Date: 6–12 June
- Edition: 30th
- Surface: Grass / outdoor
- Location: Birmingham, United Kingdom
- Venue: Edgbaston Priory Club

Champions

Singles
- (Germany) Sabine Lisicki

Doubles
- (Belarus) Olga Govortsova (Russia) Alla Kudryavtseva
| ← 2010 · | Birmingham Classic | · 2012 → |

The 2011 Aegon Classic was a women's tennis tournament played on outdoor grass courts. It was the 30th edition of the event. It took place at the Edgbaston Priory Club in Birmingham, United Kingdom, originally scheduled for 6–12 June 2011, but the final was rescheduled to 13 June 2011 due to rain. Unseeded Sabine Lisicki won the singles title.

== Entrants ==
=== Seeds ===
| Country | Player | Rank^{1} | Seed |
|---|---|---|---|
| EST | Kaia Kanepi | 16 | 1 |
| SRB | Ana Ivanovic | 21 | 2 |
| CHN | Peng Shuai | 25 | 3 |
| SVK | Daniela Hantuchová | 29 | 4 |
| ITA | Roberta Vinci | 31 | 5 |
| RUS | Ekaterina Makarova | 33 | 6 |
| ITA | Sara Errani | 39 | 7 |
| FRA | Aravane Rezaï | 41 | 8 |
| JPN | Ayumi Morita | 47 | 9 |
| SRB | Bojana Jovanovski | 50 | 10 |
| KAZ | Yaroslava Shvedova | 54 | 11 |
| JPN | Kimiko Date-Krumm | 56 | 12 |
| CAN | Rebecca Marino | 60 | 13 |
| SVK | Magdaléna Rybáriková | 62 | 14 |
| RSA | Chanelle Scheepers | 65 | 15 |
| RUS | Alla Kudryavtseva | 71 | 16 |

- ^{1} Rankings as of 23 May 2011

=== Other entrants ===
The following players received wildcards into the main draw:

- (Serbia) Ana Ivanovic
- (United Kingdom) Samantha Murray
- (United Kingdom) Melanie South
- (United Kingdom) Emily Webley-Smith

The following players received entry from the qualifying draw:

- (Japan) Shuko Aoyama
- (United Kingdom) Naomi Broady
- (Japan) Rika Fujiwara
- (Germany) Sarah Gronert
- (Switzerland) Conny Perrin
- (Russia) Arina Rodionova
- (United States) Alexandra Stevenson
- (Croatia) Ajla Tomljanović

=== Withdrawals ===
- (Russia) Maria Sharapova (illness)
- (France) Marion Bartoli (injury)

== Finals ==
=== Singles ===
(Germany) Sabine Lisicki defeated (Slovakia) Daniela Hantuchová 6–3, 6–2

- It was Lisicki's first WTA title of the year and second of her career.

=== Doubles ===
(Belarus) Olga Govortsova / (Russia) Alla Kudryavtseva defeated (Italy) Sara Errani / (Italy) Roberta Vinci 1–6, 6–1, [10–5]
