= Magdaléna Rybáriková career statistics =

Career finals
Discipline	Type	Won	Lost	Total	WR (Note: Winning rate)
Singles	Grand Slam	–	–	–	–
Singles	Summer Olympics	–	–	–	–
Singles	WTA Finals (Note: Formerly known as: Virginia Slims Championships (until 1995); WTA Tour Championships (until 2014))	–	–	–	–
Singles	WTA Elite (Note: Elite tier: WTA Tournament of Champions (2009–14); WTA Elite Trophy (2015–present))	–	–	–	–
Singles	WTA 1000 (Note: Formerly known as: Category 4 & 5 & 6 (until 1990); Tier I (until 2009); Premier Mandatory and 5 (until 2021))	–	–	–	–
Singles	WTA 500 (Note: Formerly known as: Category 3 (until 1990); Tier II (until 2009); Premier (until 2021))	0	2	2	0.00
Singles	WTA 250 (Note: Formerly known as: Category 1 & 2 (until 1990); Tier III & IV & V (until 2009); International (until 2021))	4	2	6	0.67
Singles	Total	4	4	8	0.50
Doubles	Grand Slam	–	–	–	–
Doubles	Summer Olympics	–	–	–	–
Doubles	WTA Finals	–	–	–	–
Doubles	WTA Elite	–	–	–	–
Doubles	WTA 1000	–	–	–	–
Doubles	WTA 500	–	–	–	–
Doubles	WTA 250	1	1	2	0.50
Doubles	Total	1	1	2	0.50
Total		5	5	10	0.50

This is a list of the main career statistics of Slovak tennis player Magdaléna Rybáriková.

== Performance timelines ==
Key
W	F	SF	QF	#R	RR	Q#	P#	DNQ	A	Z#	PO	G	S	B	NMS	NTI	P	NH

(W) winner; (F) finalist; (SF) semifinalist; (QF) quarterfinalist; (#R) rounds 4, 3, 2, 1; (RR) round-robin stage; (Q#) qualification round; (P#) preliminary round; (DNQ) did not qualify; (A) absent; (Z#) Davis/Fed Cup Zonal Group (with number indication) or (PO) play-off; (G) gold, (S) silver or (B) bronze Olympic/Paralympic medal; (NMS) not a Masters tournament; (NTI) not a Tier I tournament; (P) postponed; (NH) not held; (SR) strike rate (events won / competed); (W–L) win–loss record.

Only main-draw results in WTA Tour, Grand Slam tournaments, Fed Cup, Hopman Cup and Olympic Games are included in win–loss records.

=== Singles ===
Tournament	2005	2006	2007	2008	2009	2010	2011	2012	2013	2014	2015	2016	2017	2018	2019	SR	W–L
Grand Slam tournaments
Australian Open	A	A	A	A	1R	1R	1R	1R	1R	2R	2R	2R	A	4R	1R	0 / 10	6–10
French Open	A	A	A	2R	2R	2R	1R	1R	2R	2R	2R	1R	2R	3R	1R	0 / 12	9–12
Wimbledon	A	A	Q1	1R	1R	1R	1R	1R	1R	1R	3R	1R	SF	1R	2R	0 / 12	7–12
US Open	A	A	A	3R	3R	1R	1R	2R	1R	1R	1R	A	3R	1R	Q1	0 / 10	7–10
Win–loss	0–0	0–0	0–0	3–3	3–4	1–4	0–4	1–4	1–4	2–4	4–4	1–3	8–3	5–4	1–3	0 / 44	30–44
Year-end championships
WTA Elite Trophy	NH				RR	DNQ							RR	DNQ		0 / 2	1–3
WTA 1000 + former^{†} tournaments
Dubai / Qatar Open^{[2]}	NMS			A	1R	1R	A	A	A	2R	A	A	A	A	A	0 / 3	1–3
Indian Wells Open	A	A	A	A	1R	1R	A	2R	3R	3R	1R	QF	A	2R	1R	0 / 9	8–9
Miami Open	A	A	A	A	2R	2R	Q1	1R	3R	1R	1R	A	A	2R	2R	0 / 8	4–8
Madrid Open	NH				1R	1R	Q2	A	1R	2R	A	A	A	1R	Q1	0 / 5	1–5
Italian Open	A	A	A	A	1R	A	A	A	1R	1R	2R	A	A	1R	A	0 / 5	1–5
Canadian Open	A	A	A	A	1R	A	A	A	QF	2R	Q1	A	2R	2R	A	0 / 5	6–5
Cincinnati Open	NMS				1R	A	A	A	3R	1R	Q1	A	Q2	1R	A	0 / 4	2–4
Pan Pacific / Wuhan Open^{[3]}	A	A	A	A	A	A	A	Q1	3R	A	1R	A	1R	A	A	0 / 3	2–3
China Open	NMS				1R	A	A	A	1R	A	Q1	A	2R	1R	A	0 / 4	1–4
Career statistics
	2005	2006	2007	2008	2009	2010	2011	2012	2013	2014	2015	2016	2017	2018	2019	SR	W–L
Tournaments	0	2	2	9	26	21	15	17	23	25	22	7	11	22	9	211	
Titles	0	0	0	0	1	0	1	1	1	0	0	0	0	0	0	4	
Finals	0	0	0	0	1	0	2	1	1	1	0	0	1	1	0	6	
Overall win–loss	0–0	2–2	0–3	10–9	27–26	12–23	14–14	13–16	29–22	20–26	16–24	6–7	19–11	17–22	5–9	190–214	
Win %	–	50%	0%	53%	51%	36%	50%	45%	57%	43%	40%	46%	63%	44%	36%	47.03%	
Year-end ranking	302	330	279	58	45	104	72	62	38	51	77	156	20	49	173		

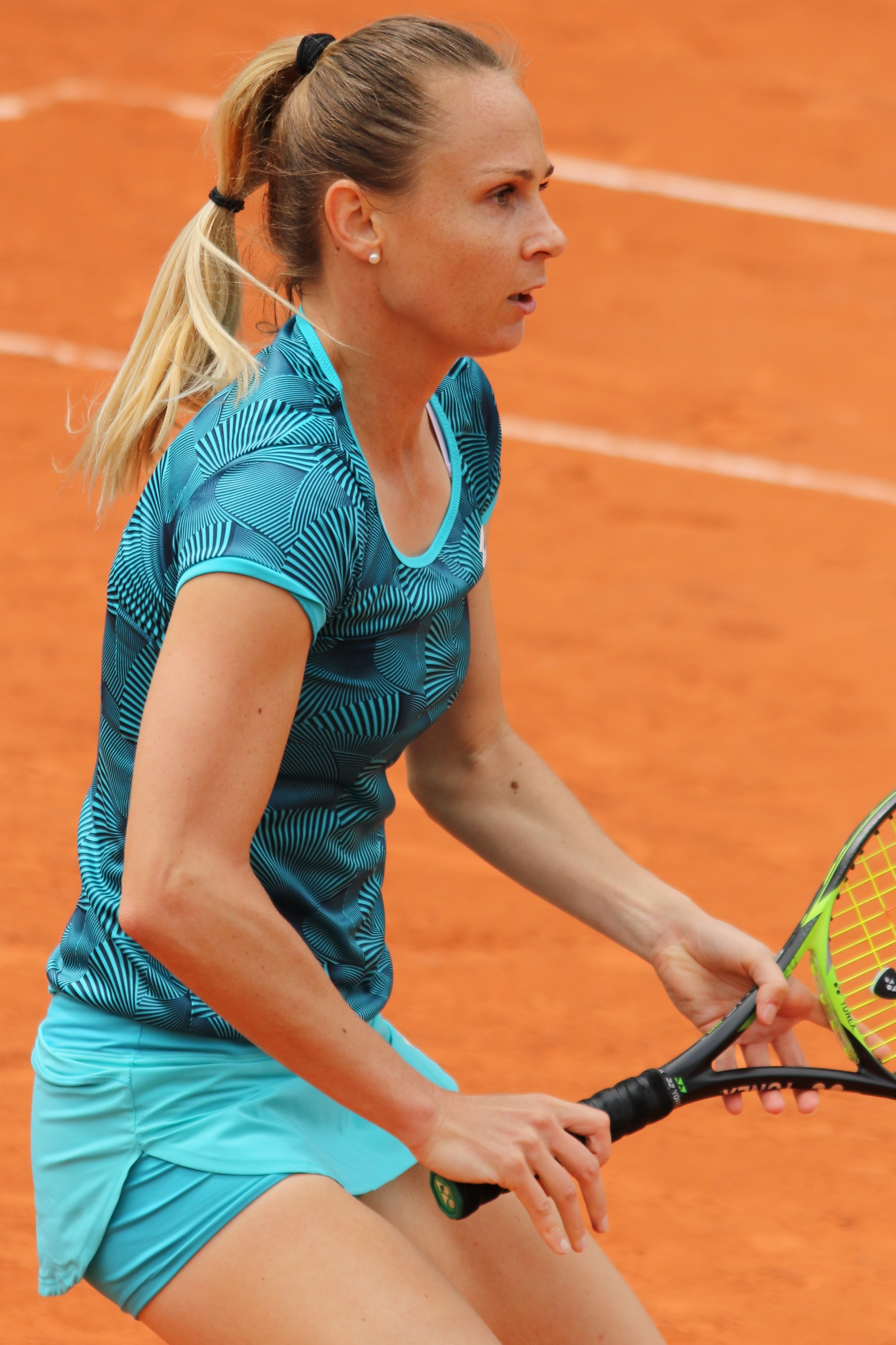
Rybáriková at the 2019 French Open.

=== Doubles ===
Tournament	2008	2009	2010	2011	2012	2013	2014	2015	2016	2017	2018	2019	SR	W–L
Grand Slam tournaments
Australian Open	A	1R	1R	3R	1R	1R	2R	1R	2R	A	A	1R	0 / 9	4–9
French Open	A	1R	1R	3R	A	2R	3R	2R	1R	A	2R	2R	0 / 9	8–9
Wimbledon	A	2R	2R	A	A	2R	SF	1R	2R	A	2R	A	0 / 7	9–7
US Open	1R	2R	3R	1R	2R	2R	1R	2R	A	2R	2R	A	0 / 10	8–10
Win–loss	0–1	2–4	3–4	4–3	1–2	3–4	7–4	2–4	2–3	1–1	3–3	1–2	0 / 35	29–35
Career statistics
Titles	0	0	0	0	1	0	0	0	0	0	0	0	1	
Finals	0	0	1	0	1	0	0	0	0	0	0	0	2	
Year-end ranking	265	134	78	112	156	130	66	160	235	401	175	869		

== WTA Tour finals ==
=== Singles: 8 (4 titles, 4 runner-ups) ===
Legend (singles) Premier (0–2) International (4–2)	Finals by surface Hard (3–3) Grass (1–1)

Result	W–L	Date	Tournament	Tier	Surface	Opponent	Score
Win	1–0	Jun 2009	Birmingham Classic, United Kingdom	International	Grass	(China) Li Na	6–0, 7–6^{(7–2)}
Win	2–0	Feb 2011	National Indoors, United States	International	Hard (i)	(Canada) Rebecca Marino	6–2, ret.
Loss	2–1	Sep 2011	Guangzhou Open, China	International	Hard	(South Africa) Chanelle Scheepers	2–6, 2–6
Win	3–1	Aug 2012	Washington Open, United States	International	Hard	(Russia) Anastasia Pavlyuchenkova	6–1, 6–1
Win	4–1	Aug 2013	Washington Open, United States	International	Hard	(Germany) Andrea Petkovic	6–4, 7–6^{(7–2)}
Loss	4–2	Aug 2014	Connecticut Open, United States	Premier	Hard	(Czech Republic) Petra Kvitová	4–6, 2–6
Loss	4–3	Oct 2017	Linz Open, Austria	International	Hard (i)	(Czech Republic) Barbora Strýcová	4–6, 1–6
Loss	4–4	June 2018	Birmingham Classic, United Kingdom	Premier	Grass	(Czech Republic) Petra Kvitová	6–4, 1–6, 2–6

=== Doubles: 2 (1 title, 1 runner-up) ===
Result	W–L	Date	Tournament	Tier	Surface	Partner	Opponents	Score
Loss	0–1	Oct 2010	Tashkent Open, Uzbekistan	International	Hard	(Romania) Alexandra Dulgheru	(Russia) Alexandra Panova (Belarus) Tatiana Poutchek	3–6, 4–6
Win	1–1	May 2012	Budapest Grand Prix, Hungary	International	Clay	(Slovakia) Janette Husárová	(Czech Republic) Eva Birnerová (Netherlands) Michaëlla Krajicek	6–4, 6–2

== ITF Circuit finals ==
=== Singles: 17 (9 titles, 8 runner–ups) ===
Legend
$100,000 tournaments
$80,000 tournaments
$50/60,000 tournaments
$25,000 tournaments
$10,000 tournaments

Result	W–L	Date	Tournament	Tier	Surface	Opponent	Score
Loss	0–1	Mar 2005	ITF Ain Alsoukhna, Egypt	10,000	Clay	(Romania) Monica Niculescu	3–6, 4–6
Win	1–1	Apr 2005	ITF Cairo, Egypt	10,000	Clay	(Germany) Sarah Raab	6–1, 6–3
Loss	1–2	Aug 2005	Ladies Open Hechingen, Germany	25,000	Clay	(Belgium) Kirsten Flipkens	4–6, 3–6
Win	2–2	Sep 2005	Save Cup, Italy	25,000	Clay	(Hungary) Kira Nagy	6–2, 7–5
Loss	2–3	Feb 2007	ITF Průhonice, Czech Republic	25,000	Carpet (i)	(Czech Republic) Petra Kvitová	5–7, 6–7^{(2)}
Loss	2–4	Dec 2007	ITF Přerov, Czech Republic	25,000	Hard (i)	(Czech Republic) Petra Kvitová	5–7, 3–6
Win	3–4	Mar 2008	ITF St. Petersburg, Russia	25,000	Hard (i)	(Russia) Anna Lapushchenkova	6–4, 6–2
Win	4–4	Apr 2008	ITF Patras, Greece	50,000	Hard	(United Kingdom) Anne Keothavong	6–3, 7–5
Loss	4–5	Aug 2008	ITF Monterrey, Mexico	100,000	Hard	(Russia) Yaroslava Shvedova	4–6, 1–6
Loss	4–6	Sep 2010	Ningbo International, China	100,000	Hard	(Italy) Alberta Brianti	4–6, 4–6
Win	5–6	May 2011	Prague Open, Czech Republic	100,000	Clay	(Czech Republic) Petra Kvitová	6–3, 6–4
Loss	5–7	Feb 2012	Midland Tennis Classic, United States	100,000	Hard (i)	(Belarus) Olga Govorstova	3–6, 7–6^{(6)}, 6–7^{(5)}
Win	6–7	May 2017	Kangaroo Cup Gifu, Japan	80,000	Hard	(China) Zhu Lin	6–2, 6–3
Win	7–7	May 2017	Fukuoka International, Japan	60,000	Carpet	(South Korea) Jang Su-jeong	6–2, 6–3
Win	8–7	Jun 2017	Surbiton Trophy, United Kingdom	100,000	Grass	(United Kingdom) Heather Watson	6–4, 7–5
Win	9–7	Jun 2017	Ilkley Trophy, United Kingdom	100,000	Grass	(Belgium) Alison Van Uytvanck	7–5, 7–6^{(3)}
Loss	9–8	Jun 2019	Surbiton Trophy, United Kingdom	100,000	Grass	(United States) Alison Riske	6–7^{(5)}, 2–6, 2–6

== Record against top-10 players ==
=== Top 10 wins ===
Season	2011	2012	2013	2014	2015	2016	2017	2018	Total
Wins	1	0	2	1	1	2	2	1	10

#	Player	vsRank	Event	Surface	Round	Score	Rank
2011
1.	(Czech Republic) Petra Kvitová	10	Sparta Prague Open	Clay	F	6–3, 6–4	72
2013
2.	(Germany) Angelique Kerber	9	Washington Open	Hard	QF	7–6^{(7–0)}, 3–6, 6–3	43
3.	(France) Marion Bartoli	8	Canadian Open	Hard	3R	7–6^{(7–5)}, 1–0 ret.	42
2014
4.	(Romania) Simona Halep	2	Connecticut Open	Hard	2R	6–2, 4–6, 6–3	68
2015
5.	(Russia) Ekaterina Makarova	8	Wimbledon	Grass	2R	6–2, 7–5	69
2016
6.	(Switzerland) Belinda Bencic	8	Indian Wells Open	Hard	3R	6–4, 3–6, 6–3	97
7.	(Italy) Roberta Vinci	10	Indian Wells Open	Hard	4R	6–2, 2–0 ret.	97
2017
8.	(Czech Republic) Karolína Plíšková	3	Wimbledon	Grass	2R	3–6, 7–5, 6–2	87
9.	(France) Kristina Mladenovic	10	WTA Elite Trophy, Zhuhai	Hard (i)	RR	7–5, 1–6, 7–6^{(7–5)}	22
2018
10.	(Czech Republic) Karolína Plíšková	7	Birmingham Classic	Grass	1R	6–2, 6–3	19
