= 2009 Aegon Classic =

- Date: 8–14 June
- Edition: 28th
- Category: WTA International
- Draw: 56S / 16D
- Prize money: $220,000
- Surface: Grass / outdoor
- Location: Birmingham, United Kingdom
- Venue: Edgbaston Priory Club

Champions

Singles
- (Slovakia) Magdaléna Rybáriková

Doubles
- (Zimbabwe) Cara Black / (United States) Liezel Huber
- Birmingham Classic

The 2009 Aegon Classic is a tennis tournament being played on outdoor grass courts. It was the 28th edition of the event, known that year as the Aegon Classic and was part of the WTA International category of the 2009 WTA Tour. The tournament was held at the Edgbaston Priory Club in Birmingham, United Kingdom from 8 June until 14 June 2009. Thirteenth-seeded Magdaléna Rybáriková won the singles title.

== Finals ==
=== Singles ===
(Slovakia) Magdaléna Rybáriková defeated (China) Li Na, 6–0, 7–6^{(7–2)}

- It was Rybáriková's only singles title of the year and the 1st of her career.

=== Doubles ===
(Zimbabwe) Cara Black / (United States) Liezel Huber defeated (United States) Raquel Kops-Jones / (United States) Abigail Spears, 6–1, 6–4

== Entrants ==
=== Seeds ===
Athlete	Nationality	Ranking*	Seeding
Zheng Jie	China	15	1
Kaia Kanepi	Estonia	18	2
Aleksandra Wozniak	Canada	24	3
Li Na	China	25	4
Anastasia Pavlyuchenkova	Russia	27	5
Ekaterina Makarova	Russia	38	6
Francesca Schiavone	Italy	40	7
Sara Errani	Italy	44	8
Bethanie Mattek-Sands	United States	45	9
Maria Kirilenko	Russia	47	10
Anne Keothavong	United Kingdom	48	11
Tamarine Tanasugarn	Thailand	52	12
Magdaléna Rybáriková	Slovakia	53	13
Roberta Vinci	Italy	54	14
Aravane Rezaï	France	57	15
Melinda Czink	Hungary	62	16

- Seedings are based on the rankings as of May 25, 2009.

=== Other entrants ===
The following players received wildcards into the main draw:

- (United Kingdom) Katie O'Brien
- (United Kingdom) Georgie Stoop
- (United Kingdom) Elena Baltacha
- (United Kingdom) Naomi Cavaday

The following players received entry from the qualifying draw:

- (Spain) Arantxa Parra Santonja
- (France) Youlia Fedossova
- (United States) Lilia Osterloh
- (United Kingdom) Naomi Broady
- (South Africa) Chanelle Scheepers
- (United States) Carly Gullickson
- (Belarus) Tatiana Poutchek
- (Russia) Anastasia Rodionova
