= 2012 Aegon Classic – Doubles =

Doubles
- 2012 Aegon Classic

Final
- Champions: (Hungary) Tímea Babos (Chinese Taipei) Hsieh Su-wei
- Runners-up: (United States) Liezel Huber (United States) Lisa Raymond
- Score: 7–5, 6–7^{(2–7)}, [10–8]

Events
Singles	Doubles
← 2011 ·	Birmingham Classic	· 2013 →

Olga Govortsova and Alla Kudryavtseva were the defending champions but Govortsova decided not to participate.
Kudryavtseva played alongside Iveta Benešová.
Tímea Babos and Hsieh Su-wei won the title beating top seeded Liezel Huber and Lisa Raymond in the final, 7–5, 6–7^{(2–7)}, [10–8]

== Seeds ==
1. (United States) Liezel Huber / (United States) Lisa Raymond (final)
2. (India) Sania Mirza / (Kazakhstan) Yaroslava Shvedova (first round)
3. (South Africa) Natalie Grandin / (Czech Republic) Vladimíra Uhlířová (quarterfinals)
4. (United States) Raquel Kops-Jones / (United States) Abigail Spears (semifinals)

== Draw ==
=== Key ===
- Q = Qualifier
- WC = Wild card
- LL = Lucky loser
- Alt = Alternate
- SE = Special exempt
- PR = Protected ranking
- ITF = ITF entry
- JE = Junior exempt
- w/o = Walkover
- r = Retired
- d = Defaulted
- SR = Special ranking

=== Draw ===
First round
1	(United States) L Huber (United States) L Raymond	6	6
(Italy) A Brianti (Romania) A Cadanțu	1	2
(Russia) V Dushevina (Thailand) T Tanasugarn	5	6	[10]
Alt	(United Kingdom) T Moore (United Kingdom) M South	7	1	[1]
4	(United States) R Kops-Jones (United States) A Spears	6	6
(Slovakia) D Hantuchová (Germany) S Lisicki	0	3
(Chinese Taipei) Y-j Chan (Chinese Taipei) H-c Chan	6	6
(Poland) K Jans-Ignacik (Poland) A Rosolska	2	4
WC	(United Kingdom) L Robson (United Kingdom) H Watson	2	1	r
(Hungary) T Babos (Chinese Taipei) S-w Hsieh	6	0
(Latvia) L Dekmeijere (Georgia (country)) A Tatishvili	3	7^{8}	[7]
3	(South Africa) N Grandin (Czech Republic) V Uhlířová	6	6^{6}	[10]
(Romania) S Cîrstea (United Kingdom) A Keothavong	3	4
(China) S Zhang (China) J Zheng	6	6
(Czech Republic) I Benešová (Russia) A Kudryavtseva	7	6
2	(India) S Mirza (Kazakhstan) Y Shvedova	5	3

Quarterfinals
1	(United States) L Huber (United States) L Raymond	6	4	[10]
(Russia) V Dushevina (Thailand) T Tanasugarn	4	6	[8]
4	(United States) R Kops-Jones (United States) A Spears	4	6	[10]
(Chinese Taipei) Y-j Chan (Chinese Taipei) H-c Chan	6	3	[5]
(Hungary) T Babos (Chinese Taipei) S-w Hsieh	4	6	[10]
3	(South Africa) N Grandin (Czech Republic) V Uhlířová	6	2	[7]
(China) S Zhang (China) J Zheng	7	6
(Czech Republic) I Benešová (Russia) A Kudryavtseva	5	3

Semifinals
1	(United States) L Huber (United States) L Raymond	6	6
4	(United States) R Kops-Jones (United States) A Spears	4	1
(Hungary) T Babos (Chinese Taipei) S-w Hsieh	w/o
(China) S Zhang (China) J Zheng

Final
1	(United States) L Huber (United States) L Raymond	5	7^{7}	[8]
(Hungary) T Babos (Chinese Taipei) S-w Hsieh	7	6^{2}	[10]
