= 2009 Aegon Classic – Singles =

Singles
- 2009 Aegon Classic

Final
- Champion: (Slovakia) Magdaléna Rybáriková
- Runner-up: (China) Li Na
- Score: 6–0, 7–6^{(7–2)}

Details
- Draw: 56 (8 Q / 4 WC )
- Seeds: 16

Events
Singles	Doubles
- Birmingham Classic

Kateryna Bondarenko was the defending champion, but chose not to participate that year.

Magdaléna Rybáriková won her maiden WTA tour title, defeating Li Na in the final 6–0, 7–6^{(7–2)}.

== Seeds ==
The top eight seeds receive a bye into the second round.

1. (China) Zheng Jie (third round)
2. (Estonia) Kaia Kanepi (withdrew, knee injury)
3. (Canada) Aleksandra Wozniak (third round)
4. (China) Li Na (final)
5. (Russia) Anastasia Pavlyuchenkova (third round)
6. (Russia) Ekaterina Makarova (second round)
7. (Italy) Francesca Schiavone (third round)
8. (Italy) Sara Errani (second round)
9. (United States) Bethanie Mattek-Sands (first round)
10. (Russia) Maria Kirilenko (first round)
11. (United Kingdom) Anne Keothavong (second round)
12. (Thailand) Tamarine Tanasugarn (second round)
13. (Slovakia) Magdaléna Rybáriková (champion)
14. (Italy) Roberta Vinci (third round)
15. (France) Aravane Rezaï (third round)
16. (Hungary) Melinda Czink (quarterfinals)

== Draw ==
Key

- Q = Qualifier
- WC = Wild card
- LL = Lucky loser
- Alt = Alternate
- ITF = ITF entry
- PR = Protected ranking
- SR = Special ranking
- SE = Special exempt
- JE = Junior exempt
- JR = Junior Accelerator Programme entrant
- CO = College Accelerator Programme entrant
- NG = Next Gen Accelerator Program entrant
- w/o = Walkover
- r = Retired
- d = Defaulted

=== Finals ===
Quarterfinals
13	(Slovakia) Magdaléna Rybáriková	6	6
(Poland) Urszula Radwańska	3	3
16	(Hungary) Melinda Czink	1	6^{4}
(India) Sania Mirza	6	7
(Switzerland) Stefanie Vögele	3	6^{3}
4	(China) Li Na	6	7
(Russia) Maria Sharapova	6	2	6
(Belgium) Yanina Wickmayer	1	6	3

Semifinals
13	(Slovakia) Magdaléna Rybáriková	3	6	6
(India) Sania Mirza	6	0	3
4	(China) Li Na	6	6
(Russia) Maria Sharapova	4	4

Final
13	(Slovakia) Magdaléna Rybáriková	6	7
4	(China) Li Na	0	6^{2}

=== Top half ===
==== Section 1 ====
First round
(United Kingdom) M South	6	1	7
WC	(United Kingdom) K O'Brien	4	6	6^{5}
(Kazakhstan) Y Shvedova	7	6^{7}	3
Q	(South Africa) C Scheepers	6^{5}	7	6
(Uzbekistan) A Amanmuradova	4	4
13	(Slovakia) M Rybáriková	6	6
10	(Russia) M Kirilenko	3	3
(Poland) U Radwańska	6	6
(Czech Republic) P Cetkovská	7	6
(France) S Foretz	6^{5}	3
Q	(Russia) A Rodionova	4	2
(Germany) J Görges	6	6

Second round
1	(China) J Zheng	6	6
(United Kingdom) M South	3	1
Q	(South Africa) C Scheepers	7	1	3
13	(Slovakia) M Rybáriková	6^{8}	6	6
(Poland) U Radwańska	6	7
(Czech Republic) P Cetkovská	3	5
(Germany) J Görges	6	5	7
8	(Italy) S Errani	4	7	5

Third round
1	(China) J Zheng	6^{10}	4
13	(Slovakia) M Rybáriková	7	6
(Poland) U Radwańska	7	6
(Germany) J Görges	6^{3}	3

Quarterfinals
13	(Slovakia) M Rybáriková	6	6
(Poland) U Radwańska	3	3

==== Section 2 ====
First round
(Belarus) O Govortsova	7	6
(Chinese Taipei) Y-j Chan	6^{7}	2
(Czech Republic) B Záhlavová-Strýcová	7	3	6
(Japan) A Morita	5	6	3
Q	(Spain) A Parra Santonja	4	3
16	(Hungary) M Czink	6	6
11	(United Kingdom) A Keothavong	6	6
(Sweden) S Arvidsson	2	2
(India) S Mirza	6	6
Q	(Belarus) T Poutchek	1	2
WC	(United Kingdom) G Stoop	3	4
WC	(United Kingdom) E Baltacha	6	6

Second round
3	(Canada) A Wozniak	6	6
(Belarus) O Govortsova	4	4
(Czech Republic) B Záhlavová-Strýcová	2	3
16	(Hungary) M Czink	6	6
11	(United Kingdom) A Keothavong	1	6^{5}
(India) S Mirza	6	7
WC	(United Kingdom) E Baltacha	7	3	6^{3}
5	(Russia) A Pavlyuchenkova	6^{1}	6	7

Third round
3	(Canada) A Wozniak	7	5	5
16	(Hungary) M Czink	6^{7}	7	7
(India) S Mirza	7	3	6
5	(Russia) A Pavlyuchenkova	6^{3}	6	2

Quarterfinals
16	(Hungary) M Czink	1	6^{4}
(India) S Mirza	6	7

=== Bottom half ===
==== Section 3 ====
First round
(Switzerland) S Vögele	3	6	7
Q	(United States) C Gullickson	6	4	5
(United States) J Ditty	2	6^{2}
WC	(United Kingdom) N Cavaday	6	7
(France) J Coin	6^{1}	1
12	(Thailand) T Tanasugarn	7	6
15	(France) A Rezaï	6	6
LL	(Colombia) M Duque Marino	4	1
(Russia) A Kudryavtseva	5	7	6
Q	(United Kingdom) N Broady	7	6^{4}	4
(United States) V King	4	4
(Slovakia) J Groth	6	6

Second round
6	(Russia) E Makarova	3	6	2
(Switzerland) S Vögele	6	3	6
WC	(United Kingdom) N Cavaday	7	2	6
12	(Thailand) T Tanasugarn	6^{5}	6	4
15	(France) A Rezaï	7	3	6
(Russia) A Kudryavtseva	6^{12}	6	2
(Slovakia) J Groth	4	6	1
4	(China) N Li	6	2	6

Third round
(Switzerland) S Vögele	6	6
WC	(United Kingdom) N Cavaday	4	2
15	(France) A Rezaï	5	4
4	(China) N Li	7	6

Quarterfinals
(Switzerland) S Vögele	3	6^{3}
4	(China) N Li	6	7

==== Section 4 ====
First round
Q	(France) Y Fedossova	6	4	2
(Ukraine) M Koryttseva	4	6	6
(Russia) M Sharapova	6	6
(Canada) S Dubois	4	2
(United States) A Glatch	7	6
9	(United States) B Mattek-Sands	6^{2}	3
14	(Italy) R Vinci	6	6
(France) S Brémond	3	2
(Italy) ME Camerin	7	5	3
Q	(United States) L Osterloh	6^{4}	7	6
(Latvia) A Sevastova	4	3
(Belgium) Y Wickmayer	6	6

Second round
7	(Italy) F Schiavone	6	6
(Ukraine) M Koryttseva	1	1
(Russia) M Sharapova	6	6
(United States) A Glatch	3	4
14	(Italy) R Vinci	6	6
Q	(United States) L Osterloh	4	2
(Belgium) Y Wickmayer	6	6
LL	(Netherlands) M Krajicek	2	4

Third round
7	(Italy) F Schiavone	1	3
(Russia) M Sharapova	6	6
14	(Italy) R Vinci	1	4
(Belgium) Y Wickmayer	6	6

Quarterfinals
(Russia) M Sharapova	6	2	6
(Belgium) Y Wickmayer	1	6	3
