= 2009 Aegon Classic – Doubles =

Doubles
- 2009 Aegon Classic

Final
- Champions: (Zimbabwe) Cara Black (United States) Liezel Huber
- Runners-up: (United States) Raquel Kops-Jones (United States) Abigail Spears
- Score: 6–1, 6–4

Details
- Draw: 16
- Seeds: 4

Events
| Singles | Doubles |
- Birmingham Classic

Cara Black and Liezel Huber were the defending champions and won in the final by beating Raquel Kops-Jones and Abigail Spears.

== Seeds ==
1. (Zimbabwe) Cara Black / (United States) Liezel Huber (champions)
2. (United States) Bethanie Mattek-Sands / (United States) Lisa Raymond (first round)
3. (Chinese Taipei) Chuang Chia-jung / (India) Sania Mirza (semifinals)
4. (United States) Raquel Kops-Jones / (United States) Abigail Spears (final)

== Draw ==
Key

- Q = Qualifier
- WC = Wild card
- LL = Lucky loser
- Alt = Alternate
- ITF = ITF entry
- PR = Protected ranking
- SR = Special ranking
- SE = Special exempt
- JE = Junior exempt
- JR = Junior Accelerator Programme entrant
- CO = College Accelerator Programme entrant
- NG = Next Gen Accelerator Program entrant
- w/o = Walkover
- r = Retired
- d = Defaulted

=== Draw ===
First round
1 | (Zimbabwe) C Black (United States) L Huber | 6 | 6
(Italy) S Errani (Russia) M Kirilenko | 4 | 1
(United States) J Ditty (United States) C Gullickson | 2 | 3
(Hungary) M Czink (South Africa) N Grandin | 6 | 6
3 | (Chinese Taipei) C-j Chuang (India) S Mirza | 6 | 7
(United States) V King (Turkey) İ Şenoğlu | 1 | 5
(Chinese Taipei) Y-j Chan (China) Z Yan | 6 | 6
WC | (United Kingdom) S Borwell (United Kingdom) A Keothavong | 2 | 4
(Kazakhstan) Y Shvedova (Thailand) T Tanasugarn | 6 | 0 | [11]
(Ukraine) M Koryttseva (Belarus) T Poutchek | 2 | 6 | [9]
(Uzbekistan) A Amanmuradova (Russia) A Rodionova | 2 | 3
4 | (United States) R Kops-Jones (United States) A Spears | 6 | 6
(Japan) A Morita (Japan) A Sugiyama | 6^{4} | 4
(Germany) J Görges (Spain) A Parra Santonja | 7 | 6
(Italy) F Schiavone (Italy) R Vinci | 6 | 6
2 | (United States) B Mattek-Sands (United States) L Raymond | 3 | 3

Quarterfinals
1 | (Zimbabwe) C Black (United States) L Huber | 6 | 4 | [10]
(Hungary) M Czink (South Africa) N Grandin | 4 | 6 | [5]
3 | (Chinese Taipei) C-j Chuang (India) S Mirza | 7 | 6
(Chinese Taipei) Y-j Chan (China) Z Yan | 6^{5} | 1
(Kazakhstan) Y Shvedova (Thailand) T Tanasugarn | 3 | 6^{4}
4 | (United States) R Kops-Jones (United States) A Spears | 6 | 7
(Germany) J Görges (Spain) A Parra Santonja | 7 | 5 | [10]
(Italy) F Schiavone (Italy) R Vinci | 5 | 7 | [12]

Semifinals
1 | (Zimbabwe) C Black (United States) L Huber | 7 | 6
3 | (Chinese Taipei) C-j Chuang (India) S Mirza | 5 | 3
4 | (United States) R Kops-Jones (United States) A Spears | 6 | 7
(Italy) F Schiavone (Italy) R Vinci | 1 | 6^{5}

Final
1 | (Zimbabwe) C Black (United States) L Huber | 6 | 6
4 | (United States) R Kops-Jones (United States) A Spears | 1 | 4
