= Kaia Kanepi =

Estonian tennis player (born 1985)

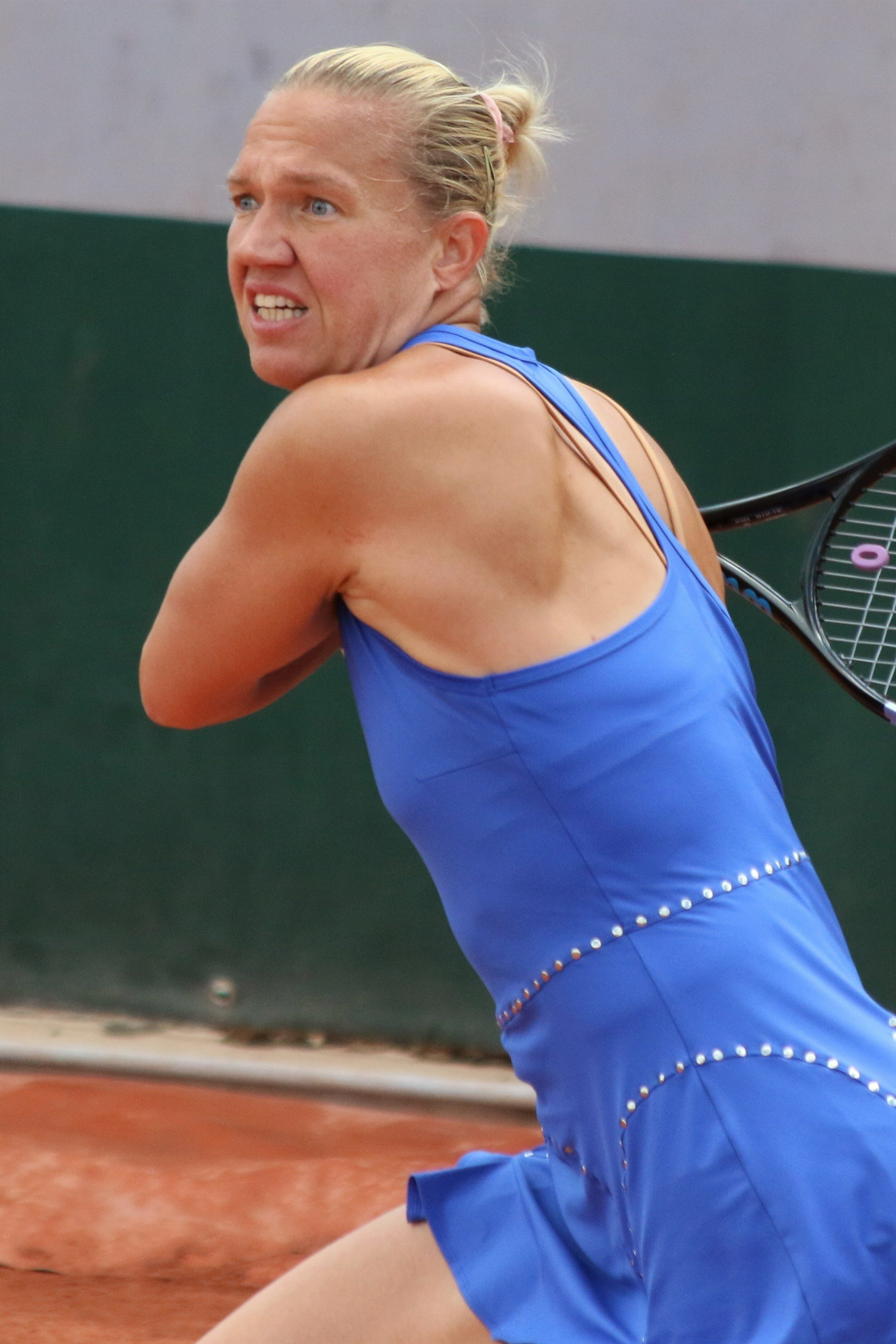
- Kanepi at the 2022 French Open
- Country (sports): Estonia
- Born: 10 June 1985 (age 41) Haapsalu, then part of Estonian SSR, Soviet Union
- Height: 1.81 m (5 ft 11 in)
- Turned pro: 1999
- Retired: 2024 (last match)
- Plays: Right-handed (two-handed backhand)
- Prize money: US$ 8,489,403
- Official website: kaiakanepi.com

Singles
- Career record: 586–352
- Career titles: 4 WTA, 21 ITF
- Highest ranking: No. 15 (20 August 2012)

Grand Slam singles results
- Australian Open: QF (2022)
- French Open: QF (2008, 2012)
- Wimbledon: QF (2010, 2013)
- US Open: QF (2010, 2017)

Other tournaments
- Olympic Games: 3R (2008)

Doubles
- Career record: 47–69
- Career titles: 2 ITF
- Highest ranking: No. 106 (6 June 2011)

Grand Slam doubles results
- Australian Open: 2R (2011, 2012, 2014)
- French Open: 3R (2012, 2014)
- Wimbledon: 3R (2008, 2009)
- US Open: 1R (2006, 2007, 2008, 2009, 2010, 2013, 2018)

Other doubles tournaments
- Olympic Games: 1R (2004, 2008)

Team competitions
- Fed Cup: 41–15
- Last updated on: 10 February 2025.

Kaia Kanepi (Estonian pronunciation: [ˈkɑi.ɑ ˈkɑnepi]; born 10 June 1985) is a former Estonian professional tennis player. She achieved her career-high ranking of world No. 15 on 20 August 2012 and has won four singles titles on the WTA Tour. Kanepi retired from professional tennis by 2025 and subsequently began competing in padel.

Described as a 'resident Grand Slam upset specialist' by The Guardian – with 19 wins over seeded players in the first week of Grand Slams; only two active players (Victoria Azarenka and Venus Williams) have more. She has also reached seven Grand Slam quarterfinals in all four championships (French Open in 2008 and 2012, Wimbledon in 2010 and 2013, the US Open in 2010 and 2017, and Australian Open 2022), becoming the first Estonian to achieve this and was the first Estonian to be ranked inside the world's top 15. Kanepi's numerous achievements have made her one of Estonia's most famous and successful professional tennis players in history. Kanepi reached her first final in 2006, becoming the first Estonian female player to do so, at the Gaz de France Stars where she lost to Kim Clijsters. She then won her first singles title at the Palermo Ladies Open in 2010, also becoming the first Estonian female player to win a title.

== Early life and background ==
Kaia Kanepi was born in Haapsalu. Her father, Jaak (a real estate broker) and mother Anne (a homemaker) played tennis. They also have daughters Kadri, who won a tennis scholarship to study in the United States, and Karin, a dedicated horse rider. Kaia, who always watched her parents and sisters play, discovered her love for tennis at an early age. She started playing at the age of eight. Her family has always supported her desire to play professional tennis.

She reached world No. 1 in the International Tennis Federation (ITF) junior rankings before turning professional in 1999.

== Professional career ==
=== 1999–2007: Turning pro, Olympics debut, Maiden WTA final ===
Kanepi represented Estonia in both the women's singles and women's doubles, partnering Maret Ani, at the 2004 Summer Olympics, losing in the first round of both events.

At the end of 2006, she reached her first WTA Tour final during the Gaz de France Stars tournament in Hasselt, Belgium. She came through three qualification rounds and beat Anne Kremer, Nathalie Dechy, Eleni Daniilidou, Francesca Schiavone, and Michaëlla Krajicek to eventually play the final against Kim Clijsters, to whom she lost in three sets.

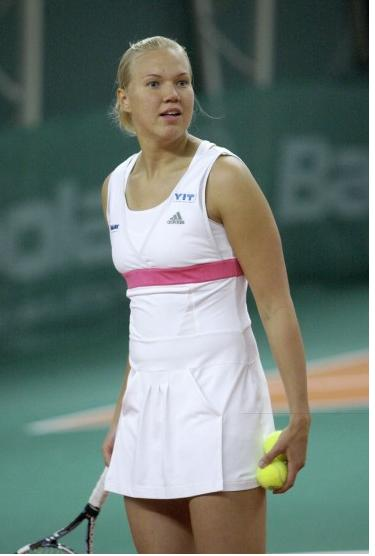
Kaia Kanepi in 2007

At the 2007 Australian Open, Kanepi struggled, but defeated 28th-seeded Flavia Pennetta before losing to Alicia Molik in the second round. In Indian Wells, she defeated wildcard Kristina Brandi in the first round, but lost in the second round to 14th seed and eventual champion, Daniela Hantuchová. At the 2007 Sony Ericsson Open in Key Biscayne, Florida, she stunned Patty Schnyder in the second round, before losing to qualifier Vera Dushevina in the next round. In late July 2007, Kanepi reached the semifinals of the Gastein Ladies tournament in Austria, where she fell to Francesca Schiavone. This was her third career semifinal and first of the year. Afterwards, she made her top-40 debut at world No. 40.

=== 2008: French Open quarterfinal ===
After losing in the first round of Australian Open, Kanepi performed better in the next Grand Slam. At the French Open, Kanepi defeated sixth seed Anna Chakvetadze in the second round. She then defeated 29th-seeded Anabel Medina Garrigues for a place in the fourth round. Outplaying unseeded Petra Kvitová she reached the quarterfinals, where she was defeated by fourth seed Svetlana Kuznetsova in straight sets. Nonetheless, Kanepi made history by becoming the first Estonian female tennis player to reach a major quarterfinal.

Kanepi was granted direct entry at Wimbledon, where she lost in the first round to sixth seed Serena Williams.

At the 2008 Summer Olympics, Kanepi reached the third round, defeating Flavia Pennetta and Virginie Razzano, before losing to Li Na.

At the US Open, she defeated Monica Niculescu in the first round, but lost to Amélie Mauresmo in the second round.

In September, Kanepi reached the quarterfinals as a qualifier of the Tier I Pan Pacific Open in Tokyo, where she defeated Vera Dushevina, world No. 13, Chakvetadze, and Virginie Razzano, before losing to world No. 5, Dinara Safina. She then reached the semifinals of the Korea Open in Seoul where she was beaten by the eventual champion and first seed, Maria Kirilenko.

She then made only her second final at the WTA level at the Tier III Japan Open in Tokyo. She defeated Lucie Šafářová, Yanina Wickmayer, Anastasia Pavlyuchenkova, and eighth seed Aleksandra Wozniak, before losing in the final to Danish then world No. 16 and top seed, Caroline Wozniacki, in three sets.

She was named the 2008 Best Female Athlete of Estonia by the Association of Estonian Sports Journalists.

=== 2009 ===
Kanepi reached her career-best third round at the Australian Open, but lost miserably to then world No. 3, Dinara Safina, in straight sets. She had an epic match with Kimiko Date, former world No. 4, in the first round.

She was a member of the Estonia Fed Cup team in rounds played in February. She was paired with Maret Ani, and the Estonian team beat Bulgaria, Croatia, and Belarus. Kanepi won all the singles rubbers that she played (including a win over then world No. 15 Victoria Azarenka). She set a new personal 196 kilometres per hour (122 mph) serve record in the tournament, among the fastest ever served by a woman.

She continued her season at the Open GdF Suez, a Premier tournament, but lost in the second round to Émilie Loit.

At the top-level Dubai Championships, she advanced to the third round to set up a match with former world number one, Jelena Janković whom she defeated in straight sets. She was the highest-seeded player Kanepi had by that time defeated. Kanepi then beat Elena Vesnina in the quarterfinals, in straight sets. She was, however, denied a place in the finals by Virginie Razzano.

Kanepi then participated at the Rome Masters. She defeated Patty Schnyder in the third round, but lost to Victoria Azarenka in the quarterfinals. Her next tournament was the Madrid Open, where she was seeded 16th. However, she retired in the first round against Lucie Šafářová. In the French Open opening round, Kanepi was defeated by Yaroslava Shvedova in the first surprise of the day. Her first round loss led to a drop in her ranking, as she fell to world No. 24.

She was then scheduled to play at the Birmingham Classic as the second seed. However, she then withdrew because of a knee injury. Kanepi was seeded 25th at the Wimbledon Championships, but lost to Carla Suárez Navarro in the first round.

Kanepi lost her opening matches at Bastad and Portoroz. Her bad form continued when she lost three straight first-round matches during the US Open Series. She fell in the first round of the US Open to qualifier Chang Kai-chen in three sets.

Kanepi lost to Chang again in the first round at Tokyo. She suffered a first-round loss at the China Open in Beijing to Serena Williams in a match where she had more break points than Serena and lost 5–7, 4–6. This was her 12th straight loss. Kanepi ended her losing streak at an ITF tournament Dubai in December, where she defeated Yuliana Fedak in straight sets in the first round. She then lost to Regina Kulikova.

=== 2010: Wimbledon and US Open quarterfinals ===
By the start of the new season, Kanepi seemed to be in better physical shape than in 2009. Kanepi reached the second round at the Auckland Open, defeating world No. 15, Li Na, in straight sets, before losing to Maria Kirilenko in the second round. She fell in the first round of the Hobart International to seventh seed Zheng Jie in a tight three-setter. At the first Grand Slam of the year at the Australian Open, Kanepi defeated Chan Yung-jan in the first round, but fell to 19th seed Nadia Petrova in the second round.

Kanepi was seeded fifth at the Cellular South Cup in Memphis. She was in the same half of the draw as Maria Sharapova. She defeated Arantxa Rus in the first round, and former world No. 7, Nicole Vaidišová, in the second round. She fell in three sets to fifth seed Petra Kvitová in the quarterfinals. Despite this, Kanepi's ranking fell to world No. 96, due to the fact that she did not defend her points from Dubai from the previous year.

Kanepi reached the second round in Acapulco, but lost to top seed and defending champion Venus Williams. Kanepi also fell in the second round of the Monterrey Open to second seed Daniela Hantuchová, in straight sets.

Kanepi then competed in two Premier Mandatory tournaments. At the Indian Wells Open and the Miami Open, she fell in the first rounds to Sorana Cîrstea and Lucie Šafářová respectively. Kanepi's ranking fell out of the top 100 following these tournaments.

She then represented Estonia in the 2010 Fed Cup World Group play-offs against Belgium. She was defeated by world No. 12 Yanina Wickmayer in her first match, but defeated former world No. 1, Justine Henin, in her second match-up.

At the beginning of May, Kanepi won ten straight matches to claim her seventh and eighth career ITF tournaments. She qualified for the French Open, where she defeated Pauline Parmentier in the first round. She pushed world No. 4, Jelena Janković, to three sets before losing in round two. This allowed her ranking to re-enter the top 100.

At the Internazionali di Palermo, Kanepi won her first WTA career singles title. She defeated top seed Flavia Pennetta for the title. At the start of the grass-court season, she reached the quarterfinals as a qualifier at Aegon Classic in Birmingham, defeating 12th seed Elena Baltacha, Jarmila Groth, and Michelle Larcher de Brito en route, before losing to top seed and eventual champion Li Na.

Kanepi then qualified for the Wimbledon Championships, defeating Olga Savchuk, Elena Bovina, and Ajla Tomljanović in straight sets. In the first round, Kanepi caused a big upset when she defeated world No. 6 and French Open finalist, Samantha Stosur. She then defeated Edina Gallovits in the second round, and world No. 31 Alexandra Dulgheru in round three. Kanepi then reached her second Grand Slam quarterfinal, when she defeated Klára Zakopalová in the fourth round. In the quarterfinals, Kanepi lost a tough three-set match to Petra Kvitová, despite having a total of five match points and being a double break up in the final set. With her success at Wimbledon, Kanepi's ranking rose to world No. 38.

Kanepi next played at the Swedish Open. She fell in the first round to fifth seed Arantxa Parra Santonja. However, she continued her strong play at the Palermo Ladies Open where, as the fifth seed, she defeated Rossana de los Ríos, Raluca Olaru, third seed Sara Errani and Romina Oprandi to reach her third WTA Tour final. In the final, Kanepi defeated top seed, world No. 12, and defending champion Flavia Pennetta, not dropping a set in the whole tournament to claim her first WTA career title.

Kanepi was seeded 31st at the US Open where she defeated Alizé Cornet, Akgul Amanmuradova, fourth seed Jelena Janković and 15th seed Yanina Wickmayer to advance to her first US Open quarterfinal, where she lost to the seventh seed and eventual runner-up, Vera Zvonareva.

Kanepi then entered the Pan Pacific Open and defeated Melanie Oudin in the first round. She then upset 13th seed Shahar Pe'er and third seed Jelena Janković in succession. Her run was ended in the quarterfinals by French Open champion Francesca Schiavone, who beat Kanepi in three sets. Her final tournament of the year was the China Open. She defeated 16th seed Anastasia Pavlyuchenkova in the first round but lost to Kvitová in the second.

=== 2011 ===
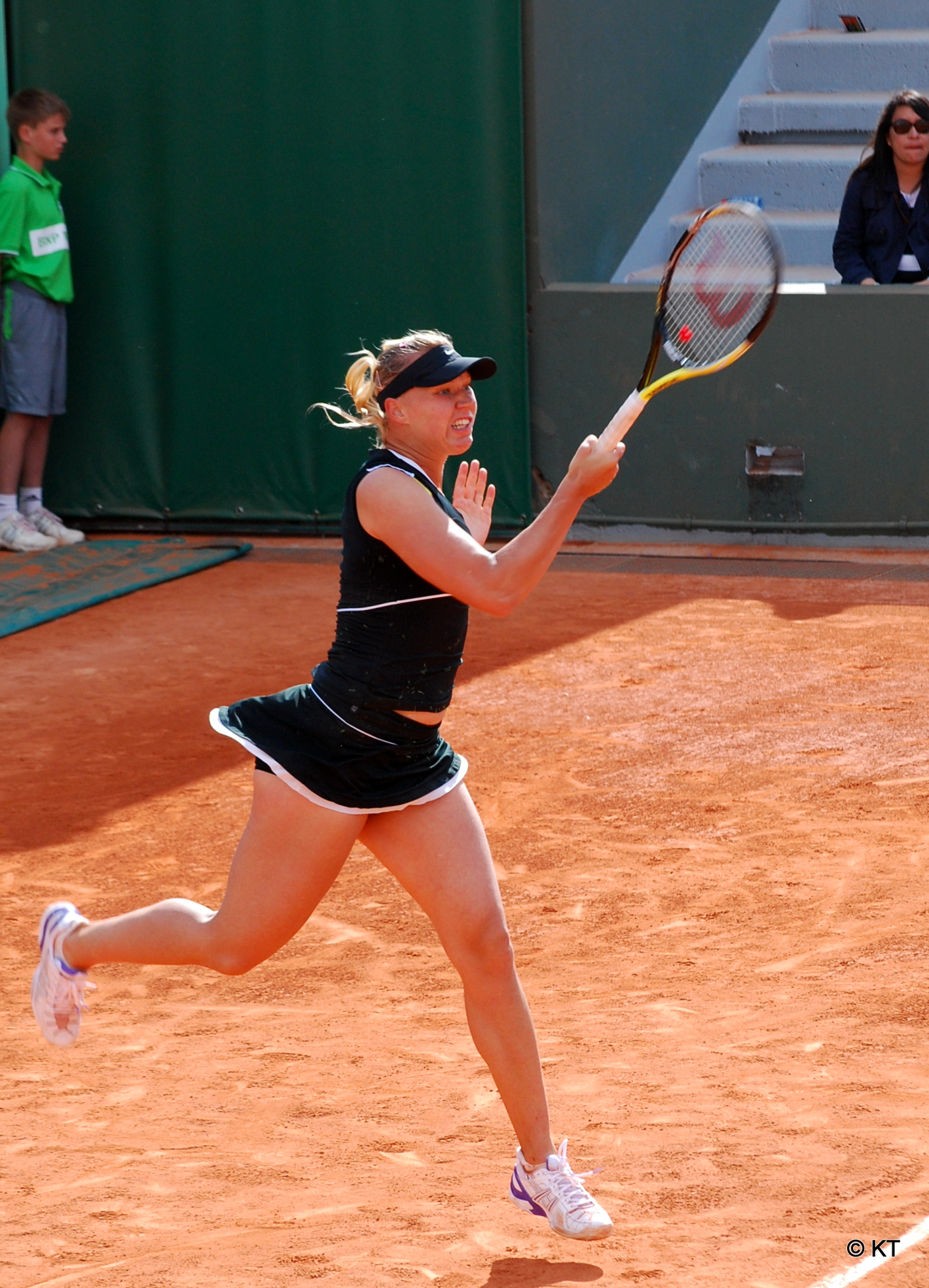
Kanepi at the 2011 French Open

Kanepi started her season with a loss to Bojana Jovanovski, in the first round of the Sydney International. Her next tournament was the Australian Open, where she was the 20th seed. There, she defeated Magdaléna Rybáriková in the first round, but fell to Julia Görges in round two. Kanepi, as the third seed, reached the semifinal in Open GdF Suez, where she beat Anastasija Sevastova, Sofia Arvidsson and Dominika Cibulková. In the semifinal, she faced the first seed Kim Clijsters, who was too strong for Kanepi this time, and Kanepi lost the match in straight sets.

Kanepi was the 14th seed at the Indian Wells Open, had a bye in the first round, and in the second defeated Gisela Dulko, before she lost to 23rd seed Yanina Wickmayer. At the Miami Open, she was the 14th seed but lost to Virginie Razzano in her opening match after having a first round bye.

She lost her opening matches at the Madrid Open and Internazionali d'Italia to Julia Görges and Romina Oprandi respectively. She qualified for the Brussels Open but was defeated by Yanina Wickmayer in the first round. At the French Open, seeded 16th, she beat Sofia Arvidsson and Britain's Heather Watson in straight sets, before being upset in the third round by unseeded Ekaterina Makarova.

Kanepi had a poor grass-court season. She lost all her opening round matches at Birmingham to qualifier Arina Rodionova after having a first round bye, at Eastbourne to fourth seed Francesca Schiavone and at Wimbledon to Sara Errani. She consequently fell out of the top 30.

Kanepi lost in the second round at the US Open to qualifier Sílvia Soler Espinosa. She had good results during the Asian swing. At the Toray Pan Pacific Open, Kanepi beat world No. 1 Caroline Wozniacki in the third round to reach the quarterfinals, where she lost to Agnieszka Radwańska. At the China Open, she met Wozniacki in the third round again but lost this time. Kanepi reached the final at the Moscow, losing to Dominika Cibulkova in three sets. She also reached the semifinals of an ITF event in Helsinki.

=== 2012: Second French Open quarterfinal ===
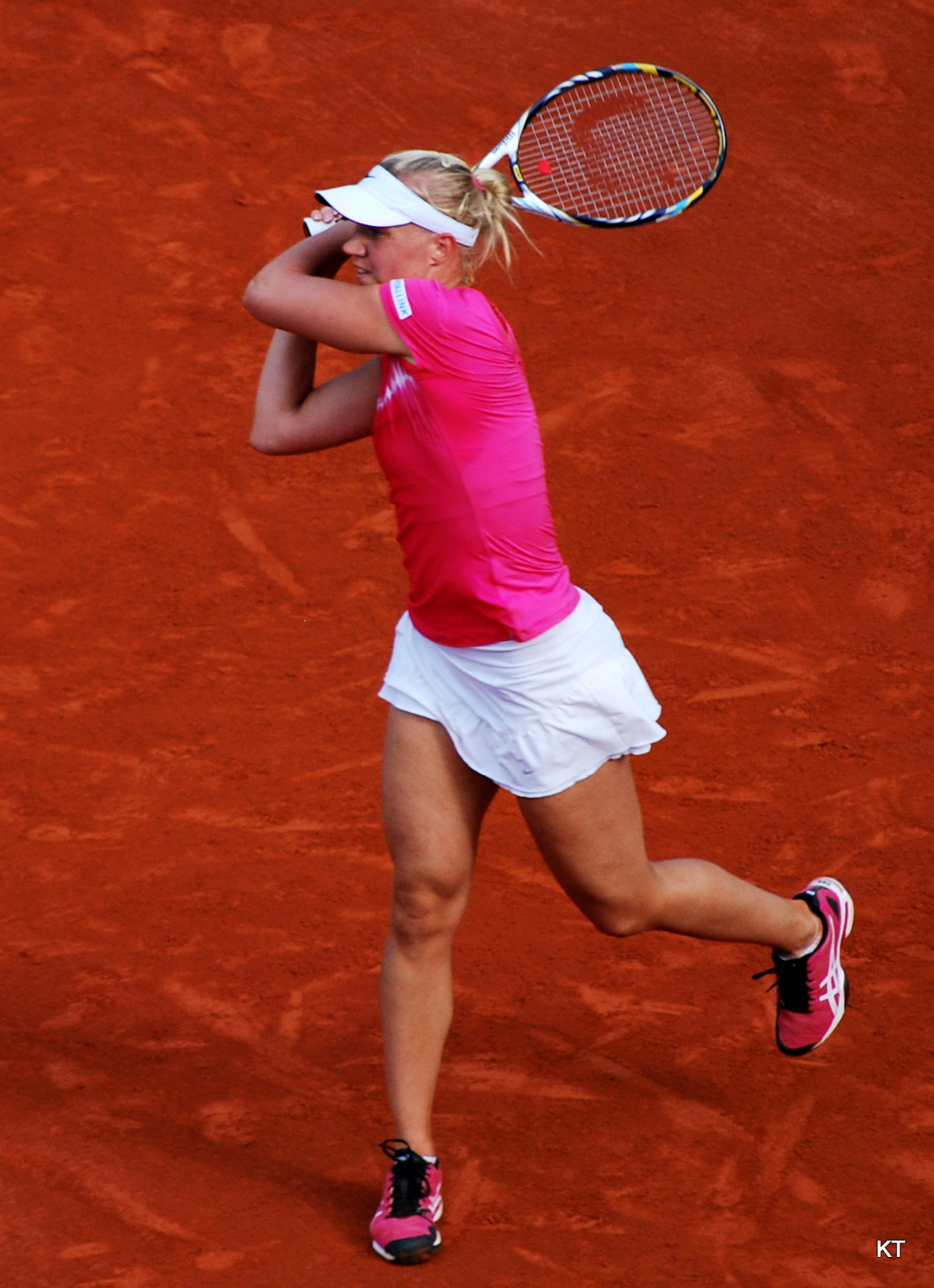
Kanepi at the 2012 French Open

Kanepi began season at the Brisbane International where she advanced to the final defeating qualifier Alexandra Panova, seventh seed Anastasia Pavlyuchenkova, second seed Andrea Petkovic, and third seed Francesca Schiavone. In the final, she beat Daniela Hantuchová to win her second WTA Tour title. At the Australian Open, she lost in second round to Ekaterina Makarova.

She then passed a chance to represent her nation in Fed Cup, wanting to dedicate herself to singles tournaments, but her hopes were cut short when she had to pull out of the Open GdF Suez tournament in Paris due to a sore shoulder. The injury also forced her to skip the Qatar Open and the Dubai Championships. Kanepi returned in March at the BNP Paribas Open. Seeded 29th, she was defeated in the second round by Chanelle Scheepers. Seeded 31st at the Sony Ericsson Open, Kanepi lost in the second round to Sílvia Soler Espinosa. At the end of the month, Kanepi and her coach for the last two years, Silver Karjus, split up over a psychologist, who supposedly influenced Kanepi's direction so much that it was impossible for him to continue working with her. Entering the e-Boks Open tournament as the fifth seed, Kanepi was defeated in her quarterfinal match by third seed Jelena Janković.

Seeded sixth at the Estoril Open, Kanepi won her third WTA title defeating Carla Suárez Navarro in the final. At the Madrid Open, Kanepi was defeated in the first round by Lucie Šafářová. Before the French Open, Kanepi reached the semifinals at the Brussels Open where she lost to top seed and eventual champion, Agnieszka Radwańska. At the French Open, Kanepi entered as the 23rd seed and played a very good tournament given her ranking, defeating Alexandra Panova, Irina-Camelia Begu, ninth seed Caroline Wozniacki, and Arantxa Rus. She was defeated in her quarterfinal match by second seed and eventual champion, Maria Sharapova.

A bilateral achilles' heel injury caused Kanepi to withdraw from the Birmingham Classic, Eastbourne International, Wimbledon Championships, and eventually also from the Summer Olympics in London. Despite not having played since the French Open she reached a career high of No. 15 on 20 August.

Kanepi returned from injury in September and competed at the Korea Open. Seeded third, she reached her third final of the year; she lost in the final to top seed Caroline Wozniacki. Seeded fifteenth at the Pan Pacific Open, Kanepi was defeated in the second round by qualifier Jamie Hampton. Following that loss, Kanepi withdrew from the China Open due to ongoing heel problems.

Kanepi didn't play anymore tournaments for the rest of the season. She ended the year ranked 19.

=== 2013: Second Wimbledon quarterfinal ===
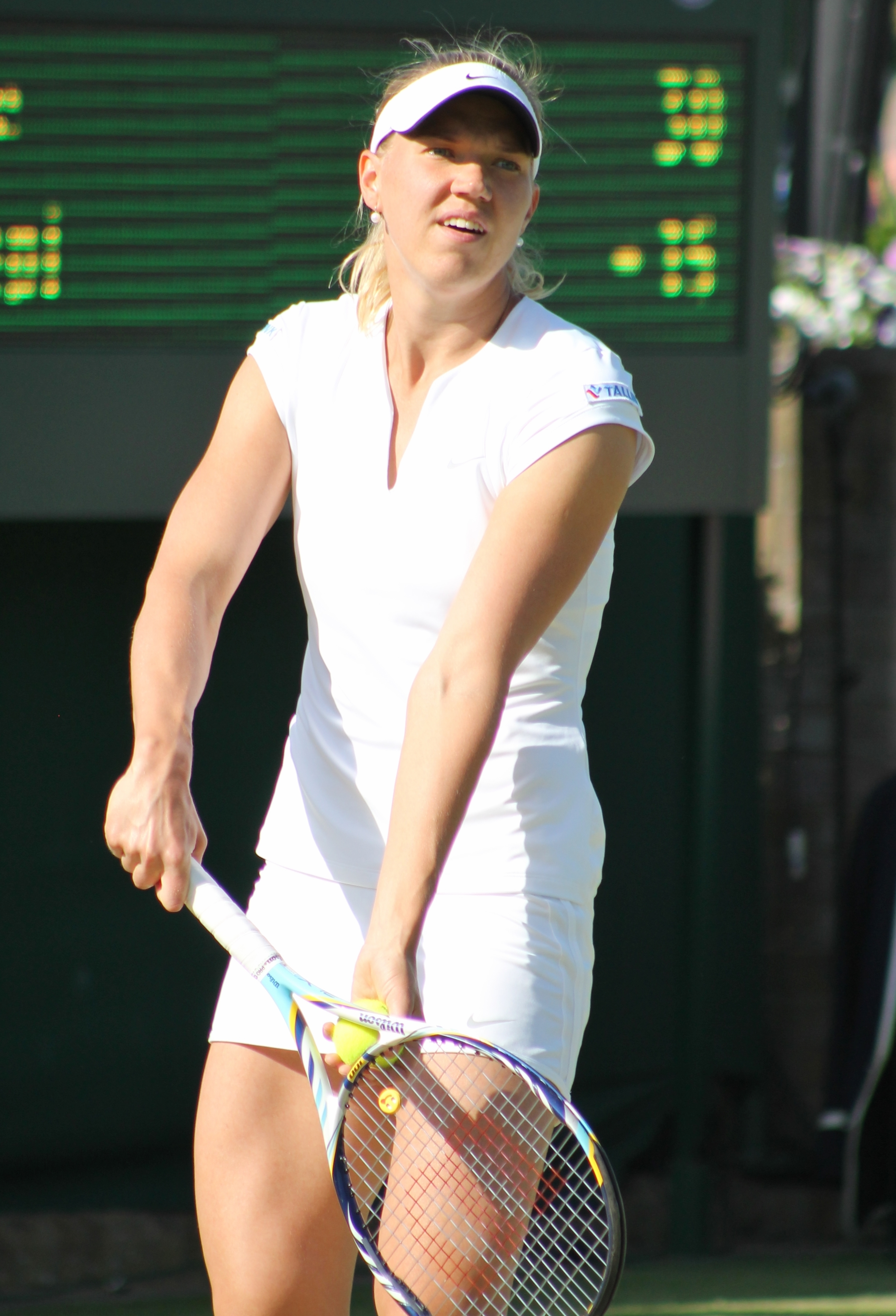
Kanepi at the 2013 Wimbledon Championships

Her continuing Achilles tendon bilateral injury caused Kanepi to withdraw from the Australian Open, Open GDdF Suez, Indian Wells Open, Miami Open, and the Family Circle Cup.

Kanepi returned to the tour in April, playing at the first edition of the Katowice Open. Seeded sixth, she lost in the second round to Karolína Plíšková. Seeded fourth at the Morocco Open, Kanepi was defeated in the second round by Mandy Minella. Kanepi failed to defend her title at the Portugal Open; she lost in the semifinal to fourth seed Carla Suárez Navarro. At the Madrid Open, Kanepi was defeated in the quarterfinal by second seed and eventual finalist Maria Sharapova. Kanepi won her fourth WTA title at the Brussels Open beating eighth seed Peng Shuai in the final. Ranked 26 at the French Open, Kanepi lost a tough three-set match in the second round to Stefanie Vögele.

Kanepi played one grass-court tournament before Wimbledon which was the Rosmalen Open. She was defeated in the first round by top seed Roberta Vinci. At the Wimbledon Championships, Kanepi advanced to the quarterfinals for the first time since 2010 defeating British wildcard Tara Moore, seventh seed Angelique Kerber, Alison Riske, and home crowd favorite Laura Robson. She lost her quarterfinal match to 23rd seed and eventual finalist, Sabine Lisicki.

Seeded 25th at the US Open, Kanepi was defeated in the third round by eighth seed Angelique Kerber.

In Beijing at the China Open, Kanepi lost in the second round to Lucie Šafářová. At the Kremlin Cup, she was defeated in the first round by seventh seed and eventual finalist Sam Stosur. Kanepi played her final tournament of the season at the Soho Square Ladies Tournament. As the top seed, she lost in the second round to Jovana Jakšić.

Kanepi ended the year ranked 30.

=== 2014 ===
She started 2014 at the Brisbane International. She reached the quarterfinals after wins over qualifier Alexandra Panova and eighth seed Carla Suárez Navarro. She lost her quarterfinal match to third seed Maria Sharapova. At the Sydney International, Kanepi was defeated in the second round by fifth seed and eventual finalist, Angelique Kerber. Seeded 24th at the Australian Open, she lost in the first round to Garbiñe Muguruza.

Kanepi defeated Varvara Lepchenko in the first round at the Qatar Ladies Open but fell to seventh seed and eventual champion, Simona Halep, in the second round. At the Dubai Tennis Championships, Kanepi lost in the first round to qualifier Flavia Pennetta. Seeded third at the Abierto Mexicano, Kanepi was defeated in her quarterfinal match by eventual finalist Christina McHale. Seeded 24th at Indian Wells, Kanepi received a first-round bye; she lost to qualifier Yaroslava Shvedova in her second-round match. Seeded 24th at Miami, Kanepi again received a first-round bye; she reached the third round where she was defeated by 15th seed Suárez Navarro.

Starting her clay-court season at the Porsche Tennis Grand Prix, Kanepi lost in the second round to eighth seed Sara Errani. Seeded fifth at the Portugal Open, Kanepi was defeated in the second round by qualifier Irina-Camelia Begu. At the Madrid Open, she lost in the first round to Alison Riske. She fell out of the top 30 after this tournament. Seeded 25th at the French Open, Kanepi suffered a first-round loss at the hands of Monica Niculescu.

She began her grass-court season at the Rosmalen Open where she was defeated in the first round by Yvonne Meusburger. At the Wimbledon Championships, Kanepi upset seventh seed Jelena Janković in the first round. She lost in the second round to Yaroslava Shvedova. After failing to defend quarterfinal points, she fell out of the top 50.

As the top seed at the Lorraine Open 88, Kanepi advanced to the final where she was defeated by fifth seed Irina-Camelia Begu. Kanepi, as the top seed, won her ninth ITF title at the Open de Biarritz beating second seed Teliana Pereira in the final. At the Swedish Open, Kanepi lost in her quarterfinal match to eventual champion Mona Barthel.

Kanepi played one tournament before the US Open which was the Connecticut Open. She fell in the final round of qualifying to Sílvia Soler Espinosa. At the US Open, Kanepi reached the fourth round after victories over Pauline Parmentier, 24th seed and 2011 champion Sam Stosur, and 15th seed Carla Suárez Navarro. She lost in the fourth round to top seed, two-time defending champion, and eventual champion Serena Williams.

Seeded sixth at the Korea Open, Kanepi was defeated in her quarterfinal match by Maria Kirilenko. In Beijing at the China Open, Kanepi lost in the first round to fourth seed and eventual champion Maria Sharapova. Kanepi's last tournament of the year was at the Generali Ladies Linz. She was defeated in the first round by Magdaléna Rybáriková.

Kanepi ended the year ranked 52.

=== 2015 ===
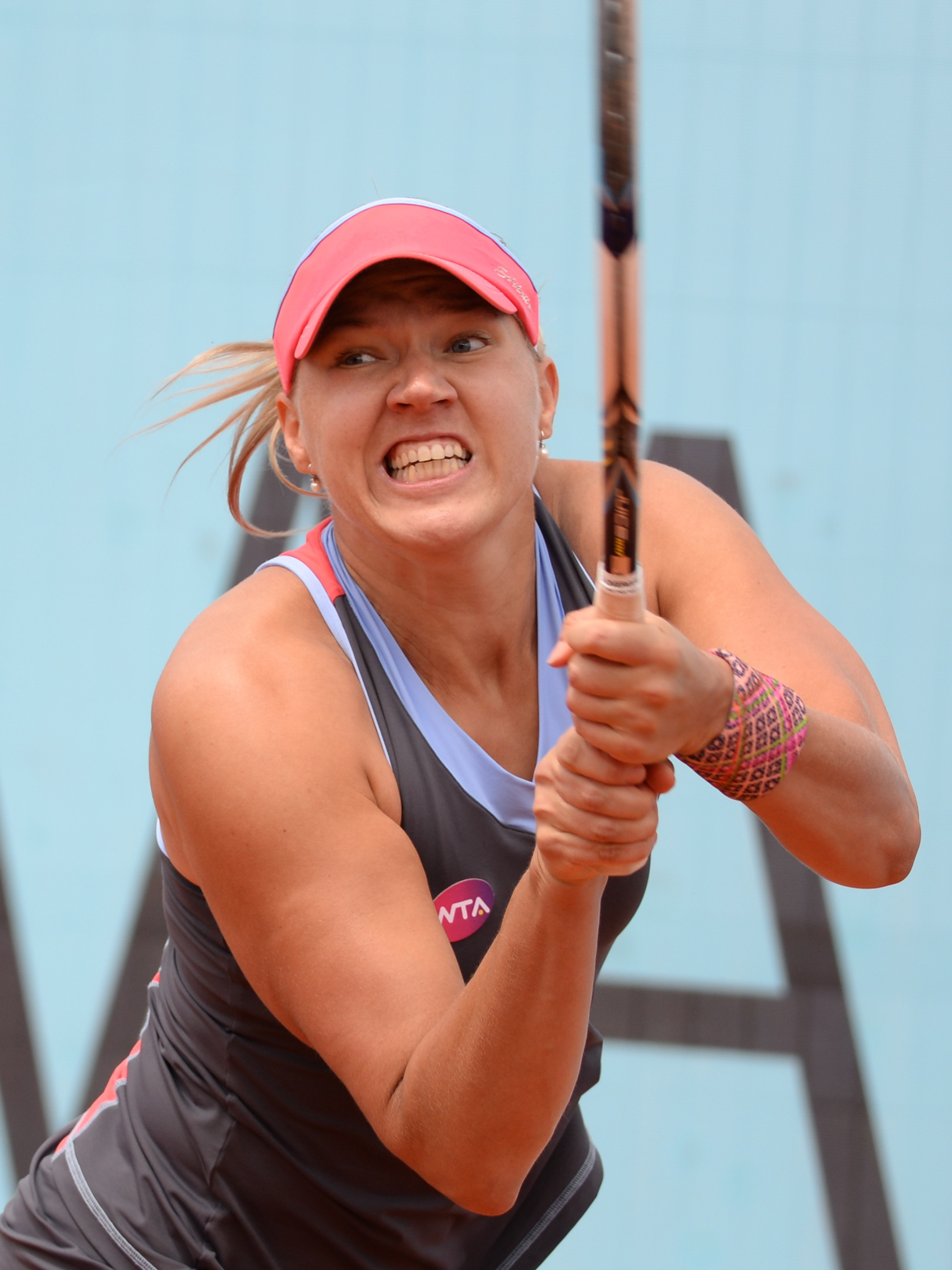
Kanepi at the 2015 Madrid Open

Kanepi began her season at the Brisbane International. She reached the quarterfinal where she lost to second seed and eventual finalist Ana Ivanovic. At the Hobart International, she defeated Monica Puig in her first-round match. She then withdrew from her second-round match against Camila Giorgi due to a viral illness. Ranked 48 at the Australian Open, Kanepi was defeated in the first round by Irina Falconi.

In February, Kanepi competed at the Dubai Tennis Championships. In the first round, she faced Svetlana Kuznetsova. Kuznetsova led 4–1 in the first set before Kanepi retired due to a back injury. At the Indian Wells Open, Kanepi lost in the first round to qualifier Ons Jabeur. Kanepi had a better result at the Miami Open. She had her first win since Hobart by defeating Françoise Abanda in the first round. In the second round, she beat 28th seed Varvara Lepchenko. In the third round, Kanepi took fourth seed Caroline Wozniacki to three sets, but she still lost the match. After Miami, Kanepi played at the Katowice Open. Seeded fifth, she beat qualifier Shahar Pe'er in the first round. She was defeated in the second round by lucky loser Elizaveta Kulichkova.

Kanepi started her clay-court season at the Morocco Open where she lost in the first round to qualifier Teliana Pereira. In Spain at the Madrid Open, Kanepi was defeated in the second round by Sam Stosur. At the French Open, Kanepi lost in the first round to second seed, former world No. 1 and defending champion, Maria Sharapova. Due to her poor result at the French Open, Kanepi competed at the Open Féminin de Marseille. As the top seed, she was defeated in the first round by Aliaksandra Sasnovich.

At Wimbledon, Kanepi was defeated in the first round by qualifier Hsieh Su-wei.

Kanepi played only one tournament during the US Open Series which was the Connecticut Open. She lost in the second round of qualifying to Magdaléna Rybáriková. At the US Open, Kanepi won her first Grand Slam match of the year by beating Anna-Lena Friedsam in the first round. She was defeated in the second round by 17th seed Elina Svitolina.

Seeded third and the defending champion at the Open de Biarritz, Kanepi lost in the first round to qualifier Amra Sadiković. Seeded second at the Open de Saint-Malo, Kanepi was defeated in her quarterfinal match by sixth seed and eventual champion, Daria Kasatkina. In Austria at the Linz Open, Kanepi lost in the final round of qualifying to Aleksandra Krunić. At the Kremlin Cup, Kanepi was defeated in the first round of qualifying by Paula Kania. Kanepi played her final tournament of the year at a $25k tournament in Bangkok, Thailand. She won the tournament as the top seed beating qualifier Patty Schnyder in the final.

Kanepi ended the season ranked 126.

=== 2016 ===
Kanepi began season at the Brisbane International where she retired during her match in the second round of qualifying against Kateryna Bondarenko.

In April, at the Stuttgart Grand Prix, she lost in the second round of qualifying to Camila Giorgi. Next, she played at the Morocco Open. After passing through the qualifying rounds, Kanepi lost in the first round to Kateryna Kozlova. At the French Open, Kanepi was defeated in the second round of qualifying by Verónica Cepede Royg.

At the Internazionali di Brescia, Kanepi lost in the second round to fourth seed Maryna Zanevska. Seeded fifth at the $25k tournament in Padua, Italy, Kanepi was defeated in her quarterfinal match by third seed İpek Soylu.

She ended 2016 ranked 302.

=== 2017: Second US Open quarterfinal ===
Kanepi returned from a long injury break in June at the Bredeney Ladies Open in Essen, Germany. She won the tournament when her opponent, seventh seed Patty Schnyder, retired from their championship match.

In London at the Wimbledon Championships, Kanepi lost in the second round of qualifying to Arina Rodionova.

At the Bucharest Open, Kanepi was defeated in the first round of qualifying by Arantxa Rus. Kanepi won a $15k tournament in Pärnu, Estonia, defeating Polina Golubovskaya in the final.

Unable to obtain a wildcard or protected ranking for the main draw, Kanepi received a protected ranking to play in the qualifying for the US Open. She qualified to her first Grand Slam main draw in two years with victories over Nina Stojanović, Louisa Chirico and Hsieh Su-wei. Kanepi recorded victories in her first three main-draw matches, defeating Francesca Schiavone, Yanina Wickmayer and Naomi Osaka, reaching the second week at a major since the 2014 US Open. She then defeated Daria Kasatkina to advance to her second US Open quarterfinal, her sixth Grand Slam quarterfinal overall, and her first quarterfinal at a major since Wimbledon 2013. She lost her quarterfinal match to 15th seed and eventual finalist, Madison Keys. Nonetheless, she made history by becoming only the second qualifier in US Open history to make the quarterfinals and the first to do so since Barbara Gerken in 1981. Following the US Open, Kanepi's ranking skyrocketed from 418 to 110.

Getting past qualifying at the Kremlin Cup, Kanepi was defeated in the first round by Natalia Vikhlyantseva. As the top seed at the Open Nantes Atlantique, Kanepi won the tournament defeating Richèl Hogenkamp in the final. Kanepi played her final tournament of the year at the Open de Limoges. Seeded seventh, she lost in her quarterfinal match to third seed Pauline Parmentier.

Kanepi managed to finish the year ranked at 107, her best end-of-year ranking since 2014.

=== 2018 ===
Kanepi began season at the Brisbane International. Qualifying for the main draw, she reached the quarterfinal round beating Daria Kasatkina and Lesia Tsurenko. She lost her quarterfinal match to second seed and defending champion Karolína Plíšková. This helped propel her back into the top 100 for the first time since August 2015. At the Australian Open, Kanepi upset 24th seed Dominika Cibulková in the opening round. She then defeated Monica Puig in the second round to advance to the third round of the Australian Open for the first time since 2009. Her run ended as she was defeated in the third round by Carla Suárez Navarro.

In March, Kanepi competed at Indian Wells; she lost in the second round to 17th seed CoCo Vandeweghe. She then retired during her first-round match at Miami against Christina McHale.

Kanepi began her clay-court season at the Porsche Tennis Grand Prix. She lost in the final round of qualifying to Zarina Diyas. Even though she qualified for the Italian Open, Kanepi was defeated in the second round by ninth seed Sloane Stephens. Coming through the qualifying round at Strasbourg, Kanepi lost in the first round to eighth seed Hsieh Su-wei. At the French Open, Kanepi was defeated in the first round by 14th seed Daria Kasatkina. Despite the loss, she returned to the top 50 of the WTA rankings for the first time since May 2015.

As the top seed at the Internazionali di Brescia, Kanepi won the tournament beating sixth seed Martina Trevisan in the final.

Kanepi kicked off her grass-court season at the Ilkley Trophy. Despite being the top seed, she lost in her quarterfinal match to seventh seed Ekaterina Alexandrova. At the Eastbourne International, Kanepi was defeated in the second round by fifth seed Jeļena Ostapenko. At the Wimbledon Championships, she lost in the first round to qualifier Sara Sorribes Tormo.

Seeded eighth at the first edition of the Moscow River Cup, Kanepi was defeated in the second round by lucky loser and eventual champion, Olga Danilović.

Coming through qualifying at the Western & Southern Open, Kanepi reached the second round where she lost to 16th seed Ashleigh Barty. At the US Open, Kanepi upset top seed Simona Halep in the first round becoming the first player in US Open history and just sixth in Grand Slam history to beat the top-seeded player in the first round. She then defeated qualifier Jil Teichmann and Rebecca Peterson to advance to the fourth round and was defeated by 17th seed Serena Williams.

Kanepi didn't play any more tournaments for the rest of the season. She ended the year ranked 58.

=== 2019 ===
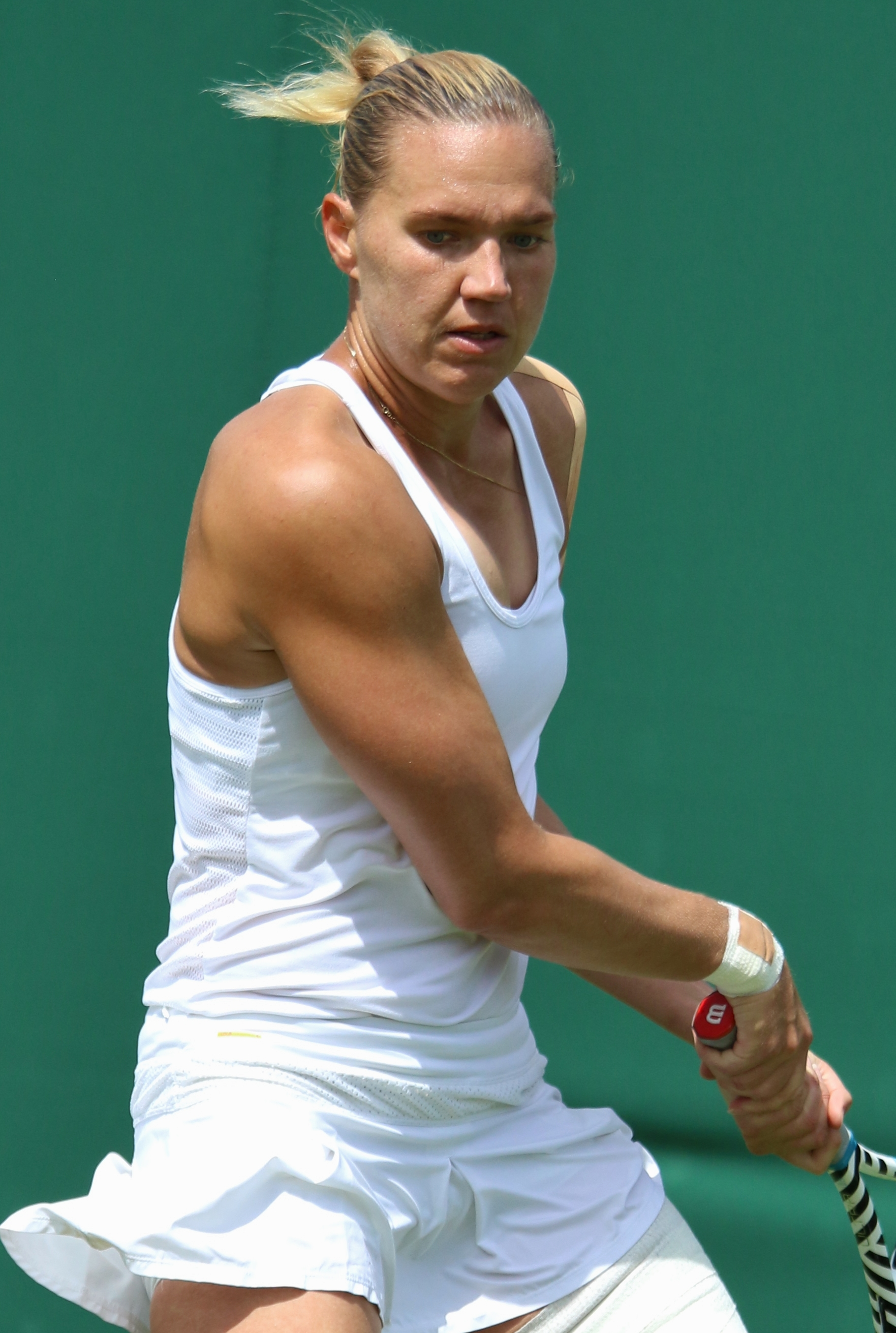
Kanepi at the 2019 Wimbledon Championships

Kanepi played her first tournament of 2019 at the Australian Open. After taking the first set in a tiebreak, Kanepi was defeated in the first round by top seed Simona Halep.

Seeded seventh at the Indian Wells Challenger, Kanepi lost in the third round to 11th seed Zarina Diyas. At the Indian Wells Open, Kanepi was defeated in the second round by 15th seed Julia Görges. Entering the Miami Open draw as a qualifier, Kanepi lost in the first round to Alison Riske.

Kanepi began her clay-court season at the Charleston Open. She reached the third round beating Veronika Kudermetova and sixth seed Elise Mertens. She was defeated in her third-round match by eleventh seed Danielle Collins. At the Madrid Open, Kanepi lost in the final round of qualifying to Kristýna Plíšková. Ranked 88 at the French Open, Kanepi advanced to the fourth round for the first time since 2008 after wins over 18th seed Julia Görges, Zhang Shuai, and Veronika Kudermetova. She was defeated in her fourth-round match by 31st seed Petra Martić.

At the Wimbledon Championships, Kanepi lost in the second round to 13th seed Belinda Bencic.

In Cincinnati at the Western & Southern Open, Kanepi was defeated in the first round of qualifying by Barbora Strýcová. Even though Kanepi qualified for the first edition of the Bronx Open, she lost in the first round to fellow qualifier and eventual champion Magda Linette. At the US Open, Kanepi was defeated in the second round by 23rd seed Donna Vekić.

As the top seed at the first edition of the Oeste Ladies Open, Kanepi lost in her quarterfinal match to eventual champion Isabella Shinikova. After getting through qualifying at the Kremlin Cup, Kanepi won her first-round match over Tímea Babos. She was defeated in the second round by second seed Kiki Bertens. As the top seed at a $15k tournament in Milovice, Kanepi won the tournament beating Anastasia Kulikova in the final. Her final tournament of the season was at the Open de Limoges in France where she lost in the first round to fourth seed Jennifer Brady.

Kanepi ended the season ranked 101.

=== 2020 ===
Kanepi started her 2020 season at the Brisbane International. She lost in the first round of qualifying to Marie Bouzková. At the Australian Open, she was defeated in the first round by qualifier Barbora Krejčíková.

The WTA Tour was suspended from March through July due to the COVID-19 pandemic. When the WTA resumed tournament play in August, she made her return at the US Open. She fell in her second-round match to 27th seed Ons Jabeur. A couple of weeks later, she competed at the rescheduled French Open and was beaten in the second round by 16th seed Elise Mertens.

=== 2021: 20th ITF title ===
Kanepi started her season at the first edition of the Gippsland Trophy. She stunned fourth seed Aryna Sabalenka in the second round. She ended up reaching the final where she lost to seventh seed Elise Mertens. The following week, at the Australian Open, she upset fourth seed and defending champion, Sofia Kenin, in the second round. This was her 13th top-ten victory, and eighth at a Grand Slam tournament. She was defeated in the third round by 28th seed Donna Vekić.

Getting past qualifying in Dubai, Kanepi was eliminated in the first round by Shelby Rogers. At the Miami Open, she was beaten in the second round by 21st seed Elena Rybakina.

Starting her clay-court season in Istanbul, Kanepi lost in the second round to third seed Veronika Kudermetova. At the Madrid Open, she was defeated in the first round of qualifying by Kateryna Kozlova. Playing the first edition of the Emilia-Romagna Open in Parma, she fell in the first round to third seed and eventual champion, Coco Gauff. At the French Open, she was eliminated in the first round by 20th seed and 2019 finalist, Markéta Vondroušová.

At Wimbledon, Kanepi lost in the first round to Liudmila Samsonova.

As the top seed at the $25k tournament in Pärnu, she won her 19th ITF title by beating Anna Sisková in the final. Playing at the first edition of the Chicago Women's Open, she was defeated in the second round by eighth seed Marta Kostyuk. Ranked 70 at the US Open, she upset 31st seed, Yulia Putintseva, in the first round. She fell in the second round to eventual finalist, Leylah Fernandez.

As the top seed at the $25k tournament in Fort Worth, Texas, Kanepi won her 20th ITF tournament by beating Kayla Day in the final. At the first edition of the Chicago Fall Classic, she was eliminated in the first round by 16th seed Jil Teichmann. Competing at the Indian Wells Open, she was beaten in the first round by Madison Keys.

Kanepi ended the season ranked 72.

=== 2022: Australian Open quarterfinal, top 30 year-end ===
Kanepi began season at the first edition of the Melbourne Summer Set 1 where she lost in the second round to Ana Konjuh. Ranked 115 at the Australian Open, she stunned 16th seed, 2016 champion, and former world No. 1, Angelique Kerber, in the first round. She reached the fourth round where she upset world No. 2, Aryna Sabalenka, in a close match with a third set super-tiebreak to reach her first quarterfinal at this major and the last one of all the majors, completing a career set of Grand Slam quarterfinals. With the victory over Sabalenka, it was her 14th career top-10 win, and ninth at a major. She fell in her quarterfinal match to seventh seed and world No. 9, Iga Świątek. After the Australian Open, her ranking improved from 115 to 63.

In March, Kanepi competed at the Indian Wells Open. She defeated 22nd seed and world No. 25, Belinda Bencic, in the second round. She was eliminated from the tournament in the third round by qualifier Harriet Dart. At the Miami Open, she beat 32nd seed Sara Sorribes Tormo, in the second round. She lost in the third round to eighth seed and world No. 10, Ons Jabeur.

Kanepi started her clay-court season at the Charleston Open. She reached the third round where she lost to Magda Linette. Getting past qualifying at the Madrid Open, she was defeated in the second round by 12th seed, world No. 14, and eventual finalist, Jessica Pegula. As the top seed at the first edition of the Trophee Lagardère, she made it to the semifinals where she lost to seventh seed, Claire Liu, who would end up winning the tournament. At the French Open, she upset world No. 10 and 2016 champion, Garbiñe Muguruza, in the first round. After beating Beatriz Haddad Maia in the second, she lost in the third round to 18th seed, world No. 23, and eventual finalist, Coco Gauff.

Kanepi started her grass-court season at the German Open. She lost in the first round to fourth seed and world No. 7, Karolína Plíšková. In Eastbourne, she was defeated in the second round by 15th seed Beatriz Haddad Maia. Seeded 31st at Wimbledon, she lost to Diane Parry in the first round.

Kanepi began her US Open Series in August by competing at the Washington Open. Seeded sixth, she reached her tenth WTA final where she lost to Liudmila Samsonova. At the Canadian Open in Toronto, she won her first-round match when her opponent, Naomi Osaka, retired due to a back injury. She lost in the second round to world No. 8, Garbiñe Muguruza. In Cincinnati, she was beaten in the first round by former world No. 1 and two-time champion, Victoria Azarenka. At the US Open, she lost in the second round to world No. 6, Aryna Sabalenka, in three sets, despite having a 6–2, 5–1 lead in the match.

At the first edition of the Tallinn Open, Kanepi beat fifth seed and world No. 17, Jeļena Ostapenko, in the first round. She reached the semifinal where she lost to top seed, world No. 4, and compatriot, Anett Kontaveit. At the San Diego Open, she fell in the first round of qualifying to American Lauren Davis. In Guadalajara, she lost in the first round to Liudmila Samsonova.

=== 2023–2024: Loss of form, hiatus ===
Kanepi started her 2023 season in 2023 Adelaide. At the first tournament, she lost in the second round to Markéta Vondroušová. At the second tournament, she fell in the final round of qualifying to Sorana Cîrstea. However, she earned a lucky loser spot into the main draw. She was defeated in the second round by ninth seed and world No. 11, Paula Badosa. Seeded 31st and last year quarterfinalist at the 2023 Australian Open, she lost in the first round to Australian wildcard Kimberly Birrell in a three-set match lasting two hours and 32 minutes. Due to her not defending her quarterfinalist points from last year, her ranking fell from No. 29 to No. 47.

In February, Kanepi played at the 2023 Dubai Championships. She was eliminated from the tournament in the first round by qualifier Viktoriya Tomova. In March, she competed at Indian Wells where she lost in the first round to Aliaksandra Sasnovich. In Miami, she lost in the first round to Camila Giorgi in a match with three tiebreaks, lasting three hours and 32 minutes, tied for the longest match of the season so far.

Kanepi started her clay-court season at the 2023 Charleston Open, and lost in the first round to Madison Brengle. In Madrid, she was defeated in the first round by Spanish qualifier, Irene Burillo Escorihuela, in three sets. As the top seed at the 2023 Wiesbaden Open, she lost in the second round to Dalila Jakupović. In Rome, she lost her first-round match to Markéta Vondroušová.

== Coaching ==
From 1994 to 2003 Kaia was trained by Tiit Kivistik. From 2003 until the autumn of 2007, Kaia was coached by Andrei Luzgin. After Luzgin, Fredrik Lovén from Sweden became her coach, but their partnership ended in February 2008. Kanepi's next coach (until September 2008) was Pablo Giacopelli. From November 2008, she was coached by Luca Appino. After November 2009, Kanepi was coached by fellow Estonia pro Mait Künnap. In February 2010, she broke up with her coach and agent. In April, she started to work with Silver Karjus, who was her coach until March 2012. From 2013–2015, she was coached by Märten Tamla. Since 2017, she has been coached by Dr. Dave Marshall. Also since 2017, Kaia has worked with her fitness coach Indrek Tustit.

== Playing style ==
Kanepi builds up her game around her powerful groundstrokes. Her serve is considered to be one of the strongest on the WTA Tour. Kanepi frequently hits 170 km/h to 180 km/h serves. She generally serves away from her opponent but sometimes prefers to hit a powerful body first serve in order to push back and pin her opponent behind the baseline. But on occasions her serve can break down, which affects her game. In 2008, she began to improve her volleying skills and under her coach Luca Appino begun to use sliced backhand more often, thus making her playing more versatile.

She likes to return serves mainly with her backhand which she hits flat and tries to position herself to receive with backhand but is also capable of hitting good service returns with her forehand as well. She generally ends points early but she is capable of playing long rallies and reducing her unforced error count. Overall, she is an offensive baseliner but depending on the game situation and scoreboard Kanepi can play a more defensive game.

== Sponsorship ==
For a long time Kanepi was sponsored by Infortar, the largest shareholder of Tallink, a major ferry company in the Baltic Sea. Their sponsorship ended in February 2010, but later started again and finally ended in 2017.

== Career statistics ==
=== Grand Slam performances ===
Key
W	F	SF	QF	#R	RR	Q#	P#	DNQ	A	Z#	PO	G	S	B	NMS	NTI	P	NH

(W) winner; (F) finalist; (SF) semifinalist; (QF) quarterfinalist; (#R) rounds 4, 3, 2, 1; (RR) round-robin stage; (Q#) qualification round; (P#) preliminary round; (DNQ) did not qualify; (A) absent; (Z#) Davis/Fed Cup Zonal Group (with number indication) or (PO) play-off; (G) gold, (S) silver or (B) bronze Olympic/Paralympic medal; (NMS) not a Masters tournament; (NTI) not a Tier I tournament; (P) postponed; (NH) not held; (SR) strike rate (events won / competed); (W–L) win–loss record.
To avoid confusion and double counting, these charts are updated at the conclusion of a tournament or when the player's participation has ended.

==== Singles ====
Tournament	2002	2003	2004	2005	2006	2007	2008	2009	2010	2011	2012	2013	2014	2015	2016	2017	2018	2019	2020	2021	2022	2023	2024	SR	W–L	Win %
Australian Open	Q2	A	Q2	A	Q1	2R	1R	3R	2R	2R	2R	A	1R	1R	A	A	3R	1R	1R	3R	QF	1R	Q1	0 / 14	14–14	50%
French Open	A	A	Q2	A	2R	1R	QF	1R	2R	3R	QF	2R	1R	1R	Q2	A	1R	4R	2R	1R	3R	1R	Q1	0 / 16	19–16	54%
Wimbledon	A	A	A	A	1R	2R	1R	1R	QF	1R	A	QF	2R	1R	A	Q2	1R	2R	NH	1R	1R	1R	A	0 / 14	11–14	44%
US Open	Q1	Q2	A	Q2	3R	1R	2R	1R	QF	2R	A	3R	4R	2R	A	QF	4R	2R	2R	2R	2R	2R	A	0 / 16	26–16	62%
Win–loss	0–0	0–0	0–0	0–0	3–3	2–4	5–4	2–4	10–4	4–4	5–2	7–3	4–4	1–4	0–0	4–1	5–4	5–4	2–3	3–4	7–4	1–4	0–0	0 / 60	70–60	54%

==== Doubles ====
Tournament	2006	2007	2008	2009	2010	2011	2012	2013	2014	...	2018	...	2021	2022	2023	SR	W–L
Australian Open	A	1R	A	1R	1R	2R	2R	A	2R		A		A	A	A	0 / 6	3–6
French Open	1R	1R	1R	2R	A	2R	3R	A	3R		A		A	A	1R	0 / 8	6–8
Wimbledon	1R	1R	3R	3R	2R	A	A	A	1R		2R		1R	1R	A	0 / 9	6–9
US Open	1R	1R	1R	1R	1R	A	A	1R	A		1R		A	A	A	0 / 7	0–7
Win–loss	0–3	0–4	2–3	3–4	1–3	2–2	3–2	0–1	3–3		1–2		0–1	0–1	0–1	0 / 30	15–30

Awards
Preceded by Irina Embrich	Estonian Sportswoman of the Year; 2008	Succeeded by Ksenija Balta
