= Kaia Kanepi career statistics =

Tennis statistics of Kaia Kanepi

Career finals
Discipline	Type	Won	Lost	Total
Singles	Grand Slam	–	–	–
Singles	WTA Finals	–	–	–
Singles	WTA 1000	–	–	–
Singles	WTA Tour	4	6	10
Singles	Olympics	–	–	–
Singles	Total	4	6	10
Doubles	Grand Slam	–	–	–
Doubles	WTA Finals	–	–	–
Doubles	WTA 1000	–	–	–
Doubles	WTA Tour	0	1	1
Doubles	Olympics	–	–	–
Doubles	Total	0	1	0

This is a list of the main career statistics of professional Estonian tennis player Kaia Kanepi.

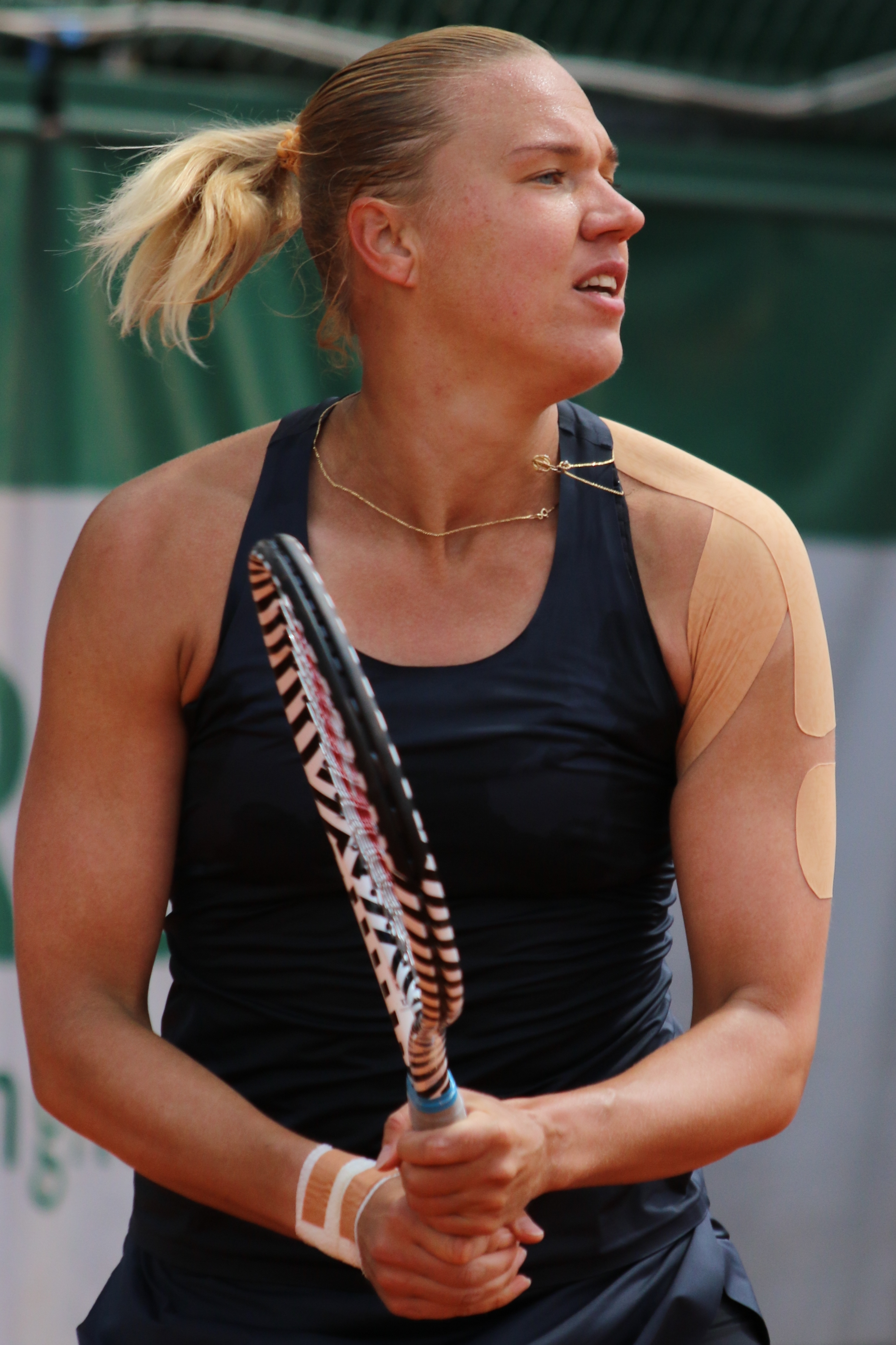
Kaia Kanepi at the 2019 French Open.

== Performance timelines ==
Key
W	F	SF	QF	#R	RR	Q#	P#	DNQ	A	Z#	PO	G	S	B	NMS	NTI	P	NH

(W) winner; (F) finalist; (SF) semifinalist; (QF) quarterfinalist; (#R) rounds 4, 3, 2, 1; (RR) round-robin stage; (Q#) qualification round; (P#) preliminary round; (DNQ) did not qualify; (A) absent; (Z#) Davis/Fed Cup Zonal Group (with number indication) or (PO) play-off; (G) gold, (S) silver or (B) bronze Olympic/Paralympic medal; (NMS) not a Masters tournament; (NTI) not a Tier I tournament; (P) postponed; (NH) not held; (SR) strike rate (events won / competed); (W–L) win–loss record.
To avoid confusion and double counting, these charts are updated at the conclusion of a tournament or when the player's participation has ended.

Only main-draw results in WTA Tour, Grand Slam tournaments, Fed Cup/Billie Jean King Cup, Hopman Cup, United Cup and Olympic Games are included in win–loss records.

=== Singles ===
Current through the 2023 US Open.

Tournament	2000	2001	2002	2003	2004	2005	2006	2007	2008	2009	2010	2011	2012	2013	2014	2015	2016	2017	2018	2019	2020	2021	2022	2023	2024	SR	W–L	Win %
Grand Slam tournaments
Australian Open	A	A	Q2	A	Q2	A	Q1	2R	1R	3R	2R	2R	2R	A	1R	1R	A	A	3R	1R	1R	3R	QF	1R	Q1	0 / 14	14–14	50%
French Open	A	A	A	A	Q2	A	2R	1R	QF	1R	2R	3R	QF	2R	1R	1R	Q2	A	1R	4R	2R	1R	3R	1R	Q1	0 / 16	19–16	54%
Wimbledon	A	A	A	A	A	A	1R	2R	1R	1R	QF	1R	A	QF	2R	1R	A	Q2	1R	2R	NH	1R	1R	1R	A	0 / 14	11–14	44%
US Open	A	A	Q1	Q2	A	Q2	3R	1R	2R	1R	QF	2R	A	3R	4R	2R	A	QF	4R	2R	2R	2R	2R	2R	A	0 / 16	26–16	62%
Win–loss	0–0	0–0	0–0	0–0	0–0	0–0	3–3	2–4	5–4	2–4	10–4	4–4	5–2	7–3	4–4	1–4	0–0	4–1	5–4	5–4	2–3	3–4	7–4	1–4	0–0	0 / 60	70–60	54%
National representation
Summer Olympics	A	NH			1R	NH			3R	NH			A	NH			A	NH				A	NH		A	0 / 2	2–2	50%
Billie Jean King Cup (Note: Formerly known as Fed Cup until 2020.)	Z2	Z1	POZ1	Z1	PO	A	Z1	A	POZ2	PO2	PO	WG2	A	A	POZ3	POZ2	A	A	A	A	A (Note: Edition is split into the two years due to COVID-19.)		A	A	A	0 / 0	28–11	72%
WTA 1000 + former
Dubai / Qatar Open (Note: The first Premier 5 event of the year has switched back and forth between the Dubai Tennis Championships and the Qatar Total Open since 2009. Dubai was classified as a Premier 5 event from 2009 to 2011 before being succeeded by Doha for the 2012–2014 period. In 2015, Dubai regained its Premier 5 status while Doha was demoted to Premier status. The Premier 5 tournaments were reclassified as WTA 1000 tournaments in 2021.)	NMS								A	SF	A	3R	A	A	2R	1R	A	A	A	A	A	1R	A	1R	A	0 / 6	7–6	54%
Indian Wells Open	A	A	A	A	A	A	1R	2R	2R	3R	1R	3R	2R	A	2R	1R	A	A	2R	2R	NH	1R	3R	1R	A	0 / 14	8–14	36%
Miami Open	A	A	A	A	A	A	A	3R	4R	3R	1R	2R	2R	A	3R	3R	A	A	1R	1R	NH	2R	3R	1R	A	0 / 13	12–13	48%
Madrid Open	NH									1R	A	1R	1R	QF	1R	2R	A	A	A	Q2	NH	Q1	2R	1R	A	0 / 8	5–8	38%
Italian Open	A	A	A	A	A	A	A	2R	1R	QF	A	1R	A	A	A	A	A	A	2R	A	A	A	A	1R	A	0 / 6	5–6	45%
Canadian Open	A	A	A	A	A	A	A	A	A	1R	3R	A	A	A	A	A	A	A	A	A	NH	A	2R	A	A	0 / 3	3–3	50%
Cincinnati Open	NH				NMS					1R	Q1	A	A	A	A	A	A	A	2R	Q1	A	A	1R	A	A	0 / 3	1–3	25%
Guadalajara Open	NH																						1R	A	NMS	0 / 1	0–1	0%
Pan Pacific / Wuhan Open (Note: In 2014, the Pan Pacific Open was downgraded to a Premier event and replaced by the Wuhan Open. The Premier 5 tournaments were reclassified as WTA 1000 tournaments in 2021.)	A	A	A	A	A	A	A	A	QF	1R	QF	QF	2R	A	A	A	A	A	A	A	NH				A	0 / 5	9–5	64%
China Open	NH				NMS					1R	2R	3R	A	2R	1R	A	A	A	A	A	NH			A	A	0 / 5	3–5	38%
Zurich Open (former)	A	A	A	A	A	A	A	Q1	NMS/NH																	0 / 0	0–0	–
Win–loss	0–0	0–0	0–0	0–0	0–0	0–0	0–1	4–3	6–4	9–9	6–5	7–7	1–4	4–2	2–5	3–4	0–0	0–0	3–4	1–2	0–0	1–3	6–6	0–5	0–0	0 / 64	53–64	45%
Career statistics
Tournament	2000	2001	2002	2003	2004	2005	2006	2007	2008	2009	2010	2011	2012	2013	2014	2015	2016	2017	2018	2019	2020	2021	2022	2023	2024	SR	W–L	Win %
Tournaments	0 (Note: During the season, she did not play in the main draw of any tour-level tournaments. However, she played at the Billie Jean King Cup, which is not counted as a played tournament but matches counted.)	1	3	0	1	2	16	17	21	21	18	17	11	11	19	12	1	2	12	9	3	12	16	15	0	Career total: 240		
Titles	0	0	0	0	0	0	0	0	0	0	1	0	2	1	0	0	0	0	0	0	0	0	0	0	0	Career total: 4		
Finals	0	0	0	0	0	0	1	0	1	0	1	1	3	1	0	0	0	0	0	0	0	1	1	0	0	Career total: 10		
Hard win–loss	0–0	0–0	0–0	0–0	0–1	3–2	8–8	4–6	22–12	15–14	17–12	17–11	13–6	3–3	15–12	10–8	0–0	4–2	9–6	3–6	1–2	9–8	18–10	4–8	0–0	1 / 137	175–137	56%
Clay win–loss	4–0	1–3	4–5	0–1	0–2	0–0	9–8	8–9	11–7	5–6	8–4	2–4	12–3	14–5	4–5	1–3	0–1	0–0	2–4	5–2	1–1	1–3	5–3	2–6	0–0	3 / 79	99–85	54%
Grass win–loss	0–0	0–0	0–0	0–0	0–0	0–0	0–1	1–2	0–2	0–1	7–2	0–3	0–0	4–2	1–2	0–1	0–0	0–0	1–2	1–1	NH	0–1	1–3	0–1	0–0	0 / 24	16–24	40%
Overall win–loss	4–0	1–3	4–5	0–1	0–3	3–2	17–17	13–17	33–21	20–21	32–18	19–18	25–9	21–10	20–19	11–12	0–1	4–2	12–12	9–9	2–3	10–12	24–16	6–15	0–0	4 / 240	290–246	54%
Win (%)	100%	25%	44%	0%	0%	60%	50%	43%	61%	49%	64%	51%	74%	68%	51%	48%	0%	67%	50%	50%	40%	45%	60%	29%	–	Career total: 54%		
Year–end ranking	n/a	203	283	167	226	120	64	75	27	61	22	34	19	30	52	126	302	107	58	101	101	72	30	168	1295	$8,445,234		

=== Doubles ===
Tournament	2006	2007	2008	2009	2010	2011	2012	2013	2014	...	2018	...	2021	2022	2023	SR	W–L
Australian Open	A	1R	A	1R	1R	2R	2R	A	2R		A		A	A	A	0 / 6	3–6
French Open	1R	1R	1R	2R	A	2R	3R	A	3R		A		A	A	1R	0 / 8	6–8
Wimbledon	1R	1R	3R	3R	2R	A	A	A	1R		2R		1R	1R	A	0 / 9	6–9
US Open	1R	1R	1R	1R	1R	A	A	1R	A		1R		A	A	A	0 / 7	0–7
Win–loss	0–3	0–4	2–3	3–4	1–3	2–2	3–2	0–1	3–3		1–2		0–1	0–1	0–1	0 / 30	15–30

== WTA career finals ==
=== Singles: 10 (4 titles, 6 runner–ups) ===
Legend Grand Slam WTA 1000 WTA 500 (2–2) WTA 250 (2–4)	Finals by surface Hard (1–6) Clay (3–0) Grass (0–0) Carpet (0–0)

Result	W–L	Date	Tournament	Tier	Surface	Opponent	Score
Loss	0–1	Nov 2006	Hasselt Cup, Belgium	Tier III (Note: The WTA Tier III tournaments, WTA Tier IV tournaments and WTA Tier V tournaments were reclassified as WTA International tournaments in 2009 and later as WTA 250 tournaments in 2021.)	Hard (i)	(Belgium) Kim Clijsters	3–6, 6–3, 4–6
Loss	0–2	Oct 2008	Japan Open	Tier III	Hard	(Denmark) Caroline Wozniacki	2–6, 6–3, 1–6
Win	1–2	Jul 2010	Palermo Ladies Open, Italy	International	Clay	(Italy) Flavia Pennetta	6–4, 6–3
Loss	1–3	Oct 2011	Kremlin Cup, Russia	Premier (Note: The WTA Premier tournaments were reclassified as WTA 500 tournaments in 2021.)	Hard (i)	(Slovakia) Dominika Cibulková	6–3, 6–7^{(1–7)}, 5–7
Win	2–3	Jan 2012	Brisbane International, Australia	Premier	Hard	(Slovakia) Daniela Hantuchová	6–2, 6–1
Win	3–3	May 2012	Estoril Open, Portugal	International	Clay	(Spain) Carla Suárez Navarro	3–6, 7–6^{(8–6)}, 6–4
Loss	3–4	Sep 2012	Korea Open, South Korea	International	Hard	(Denmark) Caroline Wozniacki	1–6, 0–6
Win	4–4	May 2013	Brussels Open, Belgium	Premier	Clay	(China) Peng Shuai	6–2, 7–5
Loss	4–5	Feb 2021	Gippsland Trophy, Australia	WTA 500	Hard	(Belgium) Elise Mertens	4–6, 1–6
Loss	4–6	Aug 2022	Washington Open, United States	WTA 250	Hard	Liudmila Samsonova	6–4, 3–6, 3–6

=== Doubles: 1 (runner–up) ===
Legend Grand Slam WTA 1000 WTA 500 WTA 250 (0–1)	Finals by surface Hard (0–1) Clay (0–0) Grass (0–0) Carpet (0–0)

Result	W–L	Date	Tournament	Tier	Surface	Partner	Opponents	Score
Loss	0–1	Apr 2012	Danish Open	International	Hard	(Sweden) Sofia Arvidsson	(Japan) Kimiko Date-Krumm (Japan) Rika Fujiwara	2–6, 6–4, [5–10]

== ITF Circuit finals ==
=== Singles: 27 (21 titles, 6 runner–ups) ===
Legend $100,000 tournaments (2–1) $75,000 tournaments (1–1) $50/60,000 tournaments (3–2) $25,000 tournaments (12–1) $10/15,000 tournaments (3–1)	Finals by surface Hard (6–1) Clay (15–5)

Result	W–L	Date	Tournament	Tier	Surface	Opponent	Score
Loss	0–1	Jul 1999	ITF Tallinn, Estonia	10,000	Clay	(Ukraine) Anna Zaporozhanova	3–6, 3–6
Win	1–1	Jun 2000	ITF Tallinn, Estonia	10,000	Clay	(Estonia) Margit Rüütel	6–1, 6–2
Win	2–1	Jun 2001	ITF Tallinn, Estonia	25,000	Clay	(Slovakia) Ľubomíra Kurhajcová	7–6^{(7–4)}, 6–3
Loss	2–2	Jul 2001	ITF Modena, Italy	50,000	Clay	(Slovenia) Maja Matevžič	5–7, 6–7^{(5–7)}
Loss	2–3	Jul 2001	ITF Ettenheim, Germany	50,000	Clay	(Slovenia) Maja Matevžič	2–6, 3–6
Win	3–3	Jun 2003	ITF Galatina, Italy	25,000	Clay	(Spain) María José Martínez Sánchez	6–3, 6–3
Win	4–3	Sep 2003	ITF Torino, Italy	25,000	Clay	(Bosnia and Herzegovina) Mervana Jugić-Salkić	6–3, 6–3
Loss	4–4	Oct 2003	Open de Touraine, France	25,000	Hard (i)	(Madagascar) Dally Randriantefy	5–7, 4–6
Win	5–4	Feb 2004	ITF Sunderland, United Kingdom	25,000	Hard (i)	(Russia) Anna Chakvetadze	7–6^{(7–5)}, 6–0
Win	6–4	Jul 2005	ITF Fano, Italy	75,000	Clay	(Hungary) Melinda Czink	3–6, 6–1, 7–5
Loss	6–5	Dec 2005	Dubai Challenge, UAE	75,000+H	Clay	(France) Marion Bartoli	2–6, 0–6
Win	7–5	May 2010	Open de Cagnes-sur-Mer, France	100,000+H	Clay	(Slovenia) Maša Zec Peškirič	6–3, 6–2
Win	8–5	May 2010	Open Saint-Gaudens, France	50,000+H	Clay	(China) Zhang Shuai	6–2, 7–5
Loss	8–6	Jul 2014	Contrexéville Open, France	100,000	Clay	(Romania) Irina-Camelia Begu	3–6, 4–6
Win	9–6	Jul 2014	Open de Biarritz, France	100,000	Clay	(Brazil) Teliana Pereira	6–2, 6–4
Win	10–6	Dec 2015	ITF Bangkok, Thailand	25,000	Hard	(Switzerland) Patty Schnyder	6–3, 6–3
Win	11–6	Jun 2017	Bredeney Ladies Open, Germany	25,000	Clay	(Switzerland) Patty Schnyder	6–3, 6–7^{(5–7)}, 2–0 ret.
Win	12–6	Jul 2017	ITF Pärnu, Estonia	15,000	Clay	(Russia) Polina Golubovskaya	6–1, 6–0
Win	13–6	Nov 2017	Open Nantes Atlantique, France	25,000	Hard (i)	(Netherlands) Richèl Hogenkamp	6–3, 6–4
Win	14–6	Jun 2018	ITF Brescia, Italy	60,000	Clay	(Italy) Martina Trevisan	6–4, 6–3
Win	15–6	Dec 2019	ITF Milovice, Czech Republic	15,000	Hard (i)	(Finland) Anastasia Kulikova	6–4, 6–3
Win	16–6	Oct 2020	ITF Cherbourg-en-Cotentin, France	25,000	Hard (i)	(United Kingdom) Harriet Dart	6–4, 6–4
Win	17–6	Oct 2020	ITF Istanbul, Turkey	25,000	Hard (i)	(Russia) Vera Zvonareva	6–3, 6–3
Win	18–6	Nov 2020	ITF Las Palmas de Gran Canaria, Spain	25,000	Clay	(Egypt) Mayar Sherif	6–3, 6–2
Win	19–6	Aug 2021	ITF Pärnu, Estonia	25,000	Clay	(Czech Republic) Anna Sisková	7–5, 6–4
Win	20–6	Sep 2021	ITF Fort Worth, Texas, U.S.	25,000	Hard	(United States) Kayla Day	6–2, 6–1
Win	21–6	Jul 2023	Amstelveen Women's Open, Netherlands	60,000	Clay	(Serbia) Lola Radivojević	6–2, 7–6^{(7–5)}

=== Doubles: 3 (2 titles, 1 runner–up) ===
Legend $100,000 tournaments (1–0) $25,000 tournaments (1–0) $10,000 tournaments (0–1)	Finals by surface Hard (1–0) Clay (1–1)

Result	W–L	Date	Tournament	Tier	Surface	Partner	Opponents	Score
Loss	0–1	Jun 2000	ITF Tallinn, Estonia	10,000	Clay	(Germany) Scarlett Werner	(Poland) Agata Kurowska (Sweden) Maria Wolfbrandt	6–7^{(5–7)}, 4–6
Win	1–1	Oct 2003	ITF Jersey, United Kingdom	25,000	Hard (i)	(Sweden) Sofia Arvidsson	(Austria) Yvonne Meusburger (Sweden) Hanna Nooni	6–3, 7–5
Win	2–1	Jul 2007	ITF Biella, Italy	100,000	Clay	(Estonia) Maret Ani	(Bosnia and Herzegovina) Mervana Jugić-Salkić (Czech Republic) Renata Voráčová	6–4, 6–1

== WTA Tour career earnings ==
Current after the 2023 Adelaide International 1.

Year	Grand Slam titles	WTA titles	Total titles	Earnings ($)	Money list rank
2007	0	0	0	174,412	90
2008	0	0	0	431,094	40
2009	0	0	0	366,659	56
2010	0	1	1	657,908	29
2011	0	0	0	420,646	52
2012	0	2	2	561,454	31
2013	0	1	1	730,985	33
2014	0	0	0	537,665	49
2015	0	0	0	290,042	109
2016	0	0	0	14,322	444
2017	0	0	0	495,359	72
2018	0	0	0	624,248	61
2019	0	0	0	614,967	69
2020	0	0	0	265,212	98
2021	0	0	0	510,058	78
2022	0	0	0	1,006,132	39
2023	0	0	0	11,145	55
Career	0	4	4	7,970,794	84

== Career Grand Slam statistics ==
=== Seedings ===
The tournaments won by Kanepi are in boldface, and advanced into finals by Kanepi are in italics.

Year	Australian Open	French Open	Wimbledon	US Open
2002	did not qualify	did not play	did not play	did not qualify
2003	did not play	did not play	did not play	did not qualify
2004	did not play	did not play	did not qualify	did not qualify
2005	did not play	did not play	did not play	did not qualify
2006	did not qualify	unseeded	unseeded	unseeded
2007	unseeded	unseeded	unseeded	unseeded
2008	unseeded	unseeded	unseeded	unseeded
2009	25th	19th	25th	25th
2010	unseeded	qualifier	qualifier	31st
2011	20th	16th	17th	31st
2012	25th	23rd	did not play	did not play
2013	did not play	unseeded	unseeded	25th
2014	24th	25th	unseeded	unseeded
2015	unseeded	unseeded	unseeded	unseeded
2016	did not play	did not qualify	did not play	did not play
2017	did not play	did not play	did not qualify	qualifier
2018	unseeded	unseeded	unseeded	unseeded
2019	unseeded	unseeded	unseeded	unseeded
2020	unseeded	unseeded	not held	unseeded
2021	unseeded	unseeded	unseeded	unseeded
2022	unseeded	unseeded	31st	unseeded
2023	31st	unseeded	unseeded	unseeded
2024	did not qualify			

=== Best Grand Slam results details ===
Grand Slam winners are in boldface, and runner–ups are in italics.

**Australian Open**
**2022 Australian Open (Unseeded)**
Round	Opponent	Rank	Score
1R	(Germany) Angelique Kerber (16)	20	6–4, 6–3
2R	(Czech Republic) Marie Bouzková	86	6–2, 7–6^{(7–3)}
3R	(Australia) Maddison Inglis (WC)	133	2–6, 6–2, 6–0
4R	(Belarus) Aryna Sabalenka (2)	2	5–7, 6–2, 7–6^{(10–7)}
QF	(Poland) Iga Świątek (7)	9	6–4, 6–7^{(2–7)}, 3–6

**Wimbledon Championships**
**2010 Wimbledon Championships (Qualifier)**
Round	Opponent	Rank	Score
1R	(Australia) Samantha Stosur (6)	6	6–4, 6–4
2R	(United States) Edina Gallovits-Hall	90	6–4, 7–5
3R	(Romania) Alexandra Dulgheru (31)	31	6–1, 6–2
4R	(Czech Republic) Klára Koukalová	66	6–2, 6–4
QF	(Czech Republic) Petra Kvitová	62	6–4, 6–7^{(8–10)}, 6–8
**2013 Wimbledon Championships (Unseeded)**
Round	Opponent	Rank	Score
1R	(United Kingdom) Tara Moore (WC)	194	7–5, 5–7, 7–5
2R	(Germany) Angelique Kerber (7)	7	3–6, 7–6^{(8–6)}, 6–3
3R	(United States) Alison Riske (WC)	126	6–2, 6–3
4R	(United Kingdom) Laura Robson	38	7–6^{(8–6)}, 7–5
QF	(Germany) Sabine Lisicki (23)	24	3–6, 3–6

**French Open**
**2008 French Open (Unseeded)**
Round	Opponent	Rank	Score
1R	(China) Yuan Meng	104	6–2, 6–2
2R	(Russia) Anna Chakvetadze (6)	6	6–4, 7–6^{(7–2)}
3R	(Spain) Anabel Medina Garrigues (29)	33	6–1, 6–7^{(5–7)}, 7–5
4R	(Czech Republic) Petra Kvitová	87	6–3, 3–6, 6–1
QF	(Russia) Svetlana Kuznetsova (4)	4	5–7, 2–6
**2012 French Open (23rd)**
Round	Opponent	Rank	Score
1R	(Russia) Alexandra Panova	74	6–3, 6–3
2R	(Romania) Irina-Camelia Begu	59	6–4, 6–1
3R	(Denmark) Caroline Wozniacki (9)	9	6–1, 6–7^{(3–7)}, 6–3
4R	(Netherlands) Arantxa Rus	88	6–1, 4–6, 6–0
QF	**(Russia) Maria Sharapova (2)**	2	2–6, 3–6

**US Open**
**2010 US Open (31st)**
Round	Opponent	Rank	Score
1R	(France) Alizé Cornet	80	3–6, 6–1, 6–0
2R	(Uzbekistan) Akgul Amanmuradova (Q)	78	6–2, 6–4
3R	(Serbia) Jelena Janković (4)	5	6–2, 7–6(7–1)
4R	(Belgium) Yanina Wickmayer (15)	18	0–6, 7–6^{(7–2)}, 6–1
QF	(Russia) Vera Zvonareva (7)	8	3–6, 5–7
**2017 US Open (Qualifier)**
Round	Opponent	Rank	Score
1R	(Italy) Francesca Schiavone	77	0–6, 6–4, 6–2
2R	(Belgium) Yanina Wickmayer	129	6–4, 6–2
3R	(Japan) Naomi Osaka	45	6–2, 2–6, 7–5
4R	(Russia) Daria Kasatkina	38	6–4, 6–4
QF	(United States) Madison Keys (15)	16	3–6, 3–6

== Wins over top 10 players ==
Season	2008	2009	2010	2011	2012	2013	2014	...	2018	...	2021	2022	Total
Wins	1	1	3	1	2	1	1		1		2	2	15

#	Player	Rank	Event	Surface	Rd	Score	KKR
2008
1.	(Russia) Anna Chakvetadze	No. 6	French Open	Clay	2R	6–4, 7–6^{(7–2)}	No. 49
2009
2.	(Serbia) Jelena Janković	No. 3	Dubai Championships	Hard	3R	6–2, 7–5	No. 24
2010
3.	(Serbia) Jelena Janković	No. 6	Pan Pacific Open	Hard	3R	6–4, 6–4	No. 80
4.	(Australia) Samantha Stosur	No. 6	Wimbledon	Grass	1R	6–4, 6–4	No. 32
5.	(Serbia) Jelena Janković	No. 5	US Open	Hard	3R	6–2, 7–6^{(7–1)}	No. 25
2011
6.	(Denmark) Caroline Wozniacki	No. 1	Pan Pacific Open	Hard	3R	7–5, 1–6, 6–4	No. 43
2012
7.	(Germany) Andrea Petkovic	No. 10	Brisbane International	Hard	QF	6–1, 7–6^{(9–7)}	No. 34
8.	(Denmark) Caroline Wozniacki	No. 9	French Open	Clay	3R	6–1, 6–7^{(3–7)}, 6–3	No. 23
2013
9.	(Germany) Angelique Kerber	No. 7	Wimbledon	Grass	2R	3–6, 7–6^{(8–6)}, 6–3	No. 46
2014
10.	(Serbia) Jelena Janković	No. 8	Wimbledon	Grass	1R	6–3, 6–2	No. 42
2018
11.	(Romania) Simona Halep	No. 1	US Open	Hard	1R	6–2, 6–4	No. 44
2021
12.	(Belarus) Aryna Sabalenka	No. 7	Gippsland Trophy	Hard	3R	6–1, 2–6, 6–1	No. 94
13.	(United States) Sofia Kenin	No. 4	Australian Open	Hard	2R	6–3, 6–2	No. 65
2022
14.	(Belarus) Aryna Sabalenka	No. 2	Australian Open	Hard	4R	5–7, 6–2, 7–6^{(10–7)}	No. 115
15.	(Spain) Garbiñe Muguruza	No. 10	French Open	Clay	1R	2–6, 6–3, 6–4	No. 46
