= 2013 Brussels Open =

- Date: 20–25 May
- Edition: 3rd
- Category: WTA Premier tournaments
- Draw: 30S / 16D
- Prize money: $690,000
- Surface: Clay / outdoor
- Location: Brussels, Belgium
- Venue: Royal Primerose Tennis Club

Champions

Singles
- (Estonia) Kaia Kanepi

Doubles
- (Germany) Anna-Lena Grönefeld / (Czech Republic) Květa Peschke
← 2012 ·	Brussels Open

The 2013 Brussels Open was a women's tennis tournament played on outdoor clay courts. It was the third and last edition of the Brussels Open, and was part of the Premier-level tournaments of the 2013 WTA Tour. The event took place at the Royal Primerose Tennis Club in Brussels, Belgium, from 18 May through 25 May 2013. Unseeded Kaia Kanepi won the singles title.

== Finals ==
=== Singles ===
(Estonia) Kaia Kanepi defeated (China) Peng Shuai, 6–2, 7–5

- It was Kanepi's only singles title of the year and the 4th and last of her career.

=== Doubles ===
(Germany) Anna-Lena Grönefeld / (Czech Republic) Květa Peschke defeated (Canada) Gabriela Dabrowski / (Israel) Shahar Pe'er, 6–0, 6–3

- It was Grönefeld's only doubles title of the year and the 13th of her career. It was Peschke's only doubles title of the year and the 25th of her career.

== Singles main draw entrants ==
=== Seeds ===
Country	Player	Rank^{1}	Seed
DEN	Caroline Wozniacki	9	1
ITA	Roberta Vinci	15	2
SVK	Dominika Cibulková	16	3
USA	Sloane Stephens	17	4
BEL	Kirsten Flipkens	21	5
GER	Julia Görges	25	6
USA	Varvara Lepchenko	31	7
CHN	Peng Shuai	38	8

- ^{1} Rankings are as of May 13, 2013.

=== Other entrants ===
The following players received wildcards into the singles main draw:

- (United Kingdom) Elena Baltacha
- (Belgium) Alison Van Uytvanck
- (Denmark) Caroline Wozniacki

The following players received entry from the qualifying draw:

- (United States) Mallory Burdette
- (United States) Melanie Oudin
- (Kazakhstan) Yulia Putintseva
- (China) Zhang Shuai

The following player received entry as a lucky loser:

- (United States) Coco Vandeweghe

=== Withdrawals ===
Before the tournament

- (Romania) Irina-Camelia Begu
- (Romania) Simona Halep (calf injury)
- (France) Kristina Mladenovic
- (Japan) Ayumi Morita
- (Poland) Agnieszka Radwańska

=== Retirements ===
- (Germany) Julia Görges

== Doubles main draw entrants ==
=== Seeds ===
Country	Player	Country	Player	Rank^{1}	Seed
IND	Sania Mirza	CHN	Zheng Jie	35	1
GER	Anna-Lena Grönefeld	CZE	Květa Peschke	42	2
TPE	Chan Hao-ching	CRO	Darija Jurak	78	3
BLR	Olga Govortsova	POL	Alicja Rosolska	108	4

- ^{1} Rankings are as of 13 May 2013.

=== Other entrants ===
The following pair received a wildcard into the doubles main draw:

- (Belgium) Kirsten Flipkens / (Slovakia) Magdaléna Rybáriková
