= 2012 Brussels Open – Singles =

Singles
- 2012 Brussels Open

Final
- Champion: (Poland) Agnieszka Radwańska
- Runner-up: (Romania) Simona Halep
- Score: 7–5, 6–0

Details
- Draw: 30
- Seeds: 8

Events
Singles	Doubles
← 2011 ·	Brussels Open	· 2013 →

Caroline Wozniacki was the defending champion, but she chose not to participate.
Agnieszka Radwańska won the title, defeating Simona Halep 7–5, 6–0 in the final.

== Seeds ==
1. (Poland) Agnieszka Radwańska (champion)
2. (France) Marion Bartoli (second round)
3. (Germany) Angelique Kerber (withdrew)
4. (Slovakia) Dominika Cibulková (quarterfinals)
5. (Italy) Roberta Vinci (withdrew)
6. (Serbia) Jelena Janković (first round)
7. (China) Peng Shuai (first round)
8. (Estonia) Kaia Kanepi (semifinals)
9. (Russia) Anastasia Pavlyuchenkova (first round)
10. (Russia) Nadia Petrova (second round)

== Draw ==
=== Key ===
- Q = Qualifier
- WC = Wild card
- LL = Lucky loser
- Alt = Alternate
- ITF = ITF entry
- PR = Protected ranking
- SR = Special ranking
- SE = Special exempt
- JE = Junior exempt
- JR = Junior Accelerator Programme entrant
- CO = College Accelerator Programme entrant
- NG = Next Gen Accelerator Program entrant
- w/o = Walkover
- r = Retired
- d = Defaulted

=== Finals ===
Semifinals
1	(Poland) Agnieszka Radwańska	7^{10}	6
8	(Estonia) Kaia Kanepi	6^{8}	3
(Romania) Simona Halep	6	6
(Sweden) Sofia Arvidsson	4	3

Final
1	(Poland) Agnieszka Radwańska	7	6
(Romania) Simona Halep	5	0

=== Top half ===
First round
(Hungary) G Arn	1	4
LL	(Ukraine) L Tsurenko	6	6
(Kazakhstan) K Pervak	3	7	4
WC	(Belgium) A van Uytvanck	6	5	6
(South Africa) C Scheepers	7	6
9	(Russia) A Pavlyuchenkova	5	2
10	(Russia) N Petrova	6	6
(Ukraine) K Bondarenko	4	4
(Greece) E Daniilidou	1	4
(Bulgaria) T Pironkova	6	6
WC	(Belgium) T Hendler	5	5
LL	(Serbia) B Jovanovski	7	7
Q	(United States) I Falconi	3	2
8	(Estonia) K Kanepi	6	6

Second round
1	(Poland) A Radwańska	6	6
LL	(Ukraine) L Tsurenko	1	0
WC	(Belgium) A van Uytvanck	4	6	6
(South Africa) C Scheepers	6	4	2
10	(Russia) N Petrova	3	2
(Bulgaria) T Pironkova	6	6
LL	(Serbia) B Jovanovski	2	2
8	(Estonia) K Kanepi	6	6

Quarterfinals
1	(Poland) A Radwańska	6	6
WC	(Belgium) A van Uytvanck	2	1
(Bulgaria) T Pironkova	3	1
8	(Estonia) K Kanepi	6	6

Semifinals
1	(Poland) A Radwańska	7^{10}	6
8	(Estonia) K Kanepi	6^{8}	3

=== Bottom half ===
First round
6/WC	(Serbia) J Janković	2	6	6^{3}
(Romania) S Halep	6	3	7^{7}
(Romania) M Niculescu	6	7
Q	(India) S Mirza	1	5
(Belgium) Y Wickmayer	3	6	6
PR	(Russia) A Chakvetadze	6	4	1
(United States) C McHale	6^{1}	1
4	(Slovakia) D Cibulková	7^{7}	6
7	(China) S Peng	5	3
(Sweden) S Arvidsson	7	6
(China) J Zheng	5	6	4
Q	(Netherlands) A Rus	7	3	6
Q	(Poland) U Radwańska	6	6
(United States) V Lepchenko	2	2

Second round
(Romania) S Halep	6	6
(Romania) M Niculescu	1	1
(Belgium) Y Wickmayer	3	4
4	(Slovakia) D Cibulková	6	6
(Sweden) S Arvidsson	6	3
Q	(Netherlands) A Rus	2	1^{r}
Q	(Poland) U Radwańska	6	6
2	(France) M Bartoli	4	2

Quarterfinals
(Romania) S Halep	0	6	6
4	(Slovakia) D Cibulková	6	4	3
(Sweden) S Arvidsson	7	6
Q	(Poland) U Radwańska	5	4

Semifinals
(Romania) S Halep	6	6
(Sweden) S Arvidsson	4	3

== Qualifying ==
=== Seeds ===
1. (Poland) Urszula Radwańska (qualified)
2. (Netherlands) Arantxa Rus (qualified)
3. (United States) Irina Falconi (qualified)
4. (Australia) Anastasia Rodionova (second round)
5. (Ukraine) Lesia Tsurenko (qualifying round, lucky loser)
6. (Serbia) Bojana Jovanovski (qualifying round, lucky loser)
7. (Australia) Olivia Rogowska (second round)
8. (Argentina) Paula Ormaechea (qualifying round)

=== Qualifiers ===
1. (Poland) Urszula Radwańska
2. (Netherlands) Arantxa Rus
3. (United States) Irina Falconi
4. (India) Sania Mirza

=== Lucky losers ===
1. (Ukraine) Lesia Tsurenko
2. (Serbia) Bojana Jovanovski

=== Qualifying draw ===
==== First qualifier ====
First round
(United States) Alexa Glatch	6	6
(Slovakia) Kristína Kučová	1	3
(Slovakia) Lenka Wienerová	7^{8}	6
(Russia) Marina Melnikova	6^{6}	4
(Ukraine) Maryna Zanevska	4	6	5
7	(Australia) Olivia Rogowska	6	2	7

Second round
1	(Poland) Urszula Radwańska	6^{4}	6	6
(United States) Alexa Glatch	7^{7}	2	2
(Slovakia) Lenka Wienerová	6	5	6
7	(Australia) Olivia Rogowska	4	7	4

Qualifying competition
1	(Poland) Urszula Radwańska	6	6
(Slovakia) Lenka Wienerová	4	2

==== Second qualifier ====
First round
(Portugal) Michelle Larcher de Brito	6	6
WC	(Belgium) Ysaline Bonaventure	1	3
WC	(United States) Melanie Oudin	3	3
(United States) Bethanie Mattek-Sands	6	6
WC	(Israel) Julia Glushko	3	4
8	(Argentina) Paula Ormaechea	6	6

Second round
2	(Netherlands) Arantxa Rus	6	6
(Portugal) Michelle Larcher de Brito	1	1
(United States) Bethanie Mattek-Sands	2	6	3
8	(Argentina) Paula Ormaechea	6	4	6

Qualifying competition
2	(Netherlands) Arantxa Rus	6	7
8	(Argentina) Paula Ormaechea	4	5

==== Third qualifier ====
First round
WC	(United States) Abigail Spears	6	6
(Bulgaria) Aleksandrina Naydenova	2	2
(Bulgaria) Dia Evtimova	6	6
(Poland) Alicja Rosolska	4	4
(Ukraine) Veronika Kapshay	1	2
6	(Serbia) Bojana Jovanovski	6	6

Second round
3	(United States) Irina Falconi	6	6
WC	(United States) Abigail Spears	1	4
(Bulgaria) Dia Evtimova	4	3
6	(Serbia) Bojana Jovanovski	6	6

Qualifying competition
3	(United States) Irina Falconi	7^{8}	5	6
6	(Serbia) Bojana Jovanovski	6^{6}	7	4

==== Fourth qualifier ====
First round
(India) Sania Mirza	7	6
(Ukraine) Yuliya Beygelzimer	5	4
(Russia) Elena Bovina	3	7	4
WC	(Switzerland) Belinda Bencic	6	5	6
(Brazil) Teliana Pereira	2	6^{6}
5	(Ukraine) Lesia Tsurenko	6	7^{8}

Second round
4	(Australia) Anastasia Rodionova	0	6	2
(India) Sania Mirza	6	2	6
WC	(Switzerland) Belinda Bencic	4	2
5	(Ukraine) Lesia Tsurenko	6	6

Qualifying competition
(India) Sania Mirza	6	6
5	(Ukraine) Lesia Tsurenko	0	0
