= 2011 Brussels Open – Singles =

Singles
- 2011 Brussels Open

Final
- Champion: (Denmark) Caroline Wozniacki
- Runner-up: (China) Peng Shuai
- Score: 2–6, 6–3, 6–3

Details
- Draw: 30
- Seeds: 8

Events
Singles	Doubles
← 2010 ·	Brussels Open	· 2012 →

World No. 1 Caroline Wozniacki won the title, beating Peng Shuai in the final 2–6, 6–3, 6–3. It was Wozniacki's 16th career title and 4th of the year.

== Seeds ==
The top two seeds received a bye into the second round.

1. (Denmark) Caroline Wozniacki (champion)
2. (Russia) Vera Zvonareva (semifinals)
3. (Italy) Francesca Schiavone (semifinals)
4. (Serbia) Jelena Janković (second round)
5. (Israel) Shahar Pe'er (first round)
6. (Belgium) Yanina Wickmayer (quarterfinals, retired due to a back injury)
7. (Romania) Alexandra Dulgheru (quarterfinals)
8. (China) Peng Shuai (final)

== Draw ==
=== Key ===
- Q = Qualifier
- WC = Wild card
- LL = Lucky loser
- Alt = Alternate
- ITF = ITF entry
- PR = Protected ranking
- SR = Special ranking
- SE = Special exempt
- JE = Junior exempt
- JR = Junior Accelerator Programme entrant
- CO = College Accelerator Programme entrant
- NG = Next Gen Accelerator Program entrant
- w/o = Walkover
- r = Retired
- d = Defaulted

=== Finals ===
Semifinals
1	(Denmark) Caroline Wozniacki	6	4	6
3	(Italy) Francesca Schiavone	4	6	3
8	(China) Peng Shuai	6	6
2	(Russia) Vera Zvonareva	3	3

Final
1	(Denmark) Caroline Wozniacki	2	6	6
8	(China) Peng Shuai	6	3	3

=== Top half ===
First round
WC	(Belgium) A-S Mestach	3	6^{3}
(United States) V Lepchenko	6	7
(Switzerland) P Schnyder	3	6	2
Q	(Belgium) A van Uytvanck	6	2	6
Q	(Estonia) K Kanepi	1	6	5
6	(Belgium) Y Wickmayer	6	4	7
3	(Italy) F Schiavone	6	7
(Bulgaria) T Pironkova	2	5
(Czech Republic) Z Ondrášková	5	3
LL	(United States) I Falconi	7	6
(China) J Zheng	4	6	1
(Japan) A Morita	6	4	6
PR	(Australia) C Dellacqua	6	5	6
5	(Israel) S Pe'er	1	7	3

Second round
1	(Denmark) C Wozniacki	6	7
(United States) V Lepchenko	4	6^{5}
Q	(Belgium) A van Uytvanck	6^{2}	4
6	(Belgium) Y Wickmayer	7	6
3	(Italy) F Schiavone	6	6
LL	(United States) I Falconi	4	4
(Japan) A Morita	1	6	7
PR	(Australia) C Dellacqua	6	0	5

Quarterfinals
1	(Denmark) C Wozniacki	2
6	(Belgium) Y Wickmayer	0^{r}
3	(Italy) F Schiavone	6	6
(Japan) A Morita	2	3

Semifinals
1	(Denmark) C Wozniacki	6	4	6
3	(Italy) F Schiavone	4	6	3

=== Bottom half ===
First round
8	(China) S Peng	6	1	6
WC	(Belgium) K Flipkens	0	6	3
Q	(United States) A Spears	6	6
(South Africa) C Scheepers	3	1
(Sweden) S Arvidsson	6	7
(United States) C Vandeweghe	3	6^{4}
(Australia) A Rodionova	2	3
4	(Serbia) J Janković	6	6
7	(Romania) A Dulgheru	2	6	6
(Slovenia) P Hercog	6	4	2
(Czech Republic) K Zakopalová	7	3	6
(Russia) K Pervak	5	6	4
Q	(Kazakhstan) G Voskoboeva	5
(Hungary) Á Szávay	2^{r}

Second round
8	(China) S Peng	6	6
Q	(United States) A Spears	2	0
(Sweden) S Arvidsson	3	6	6
4	(Serbia) J Janković	6	3	3
7	(Romania) A Dulgheru	6	6
(Czech Republic) K Zakopalová	3	2
Q	(Kazakhstan) G Voskoboeva	6	4	3
2	(Russia) V Zvonareva	2	6	6

Quarterfinals
8	(China) S Peng	6	6
(Sweden) S Arvidsson	2	4
7	(Romania) A Dulgheru	0	1
2	(Russia) V Zvonareva	6	6

Semifinals
8	(China) S Peng	6	6
2	(Russia) V Zvonareva	3	3
