= 2011 Brussels Open – Doubles =

Doubles
- 2011 Brussels Open

Final
- Champion: (Czech Republic) Andrea Hlaváčková (Kazakhstan) Galina Voskoboeva
- Runner-up: (Poland) Klaudia Jans (Poland) Alicja Rosolska
- Score: 3–6, 6–0, [10–5]

Details
- Draw: 16
- Seeds: 4

Events
Singles	Doubles
← 2010 ·	Brussels Open	· 2012 →

This was the first edition of the tournament. Andrea Hlaváčková and Galina Voskoboeva won the title beating polish pair Klaudia Jans and Alicja Rosolska 3–6, 6–0, [10–5] in the final.

== Seeds ==
1. (United States) Liezel Huber / (United States) Lisa Raymond (quarterfinals)
2. (Poland) Klaudia Jans / (Poland) Alicja Rosolska (final)
3. (United States) Raquel Kops-Jones / (United States) Abigail Spears (quarterfinals)
4. (Russia) Maria Kondratieva / (France) Sophie Lefèvre (first round)

== Draw ==
=== Key ===
- Q = Qualifier
- WC = Wild card
- LL = Lucky loser
- Alt = Alternate
- ITF = ITF entry
- PR = Protected ranking
- SR = Special ranking
- SE = Special exempt
- JE = Junior exempt
- JR = Junior Accelerator Programme entrant
- CO = College Accelerator Programme entrant
- NG = Next Gen Accelerator Program entrant
- w/o = Walkover
- r = Retired
- d = Defaulted

=== Draw ===
First round
1	(United States) L Huber (United States) L Raymond	7	7
(United States) I Falconi (United States) C Vandeweghe	6^{5}	5
(Latvia) L Dekmeijere (United States) M Moulton-Levy	2	7	[5]
(Czech Republic) A Hlaváčková (Kazakhstan) G Voskoboeva	6	5	[10]
4	(Russia) M Kondratieva (France) S Lefèvre	3	4
(Russia) E Bovina (Estonia) K Kanepi	6	6
(Belgium) K Flipkens (Belgium) Y Wickmayer	5	5
(Austria) S Klemenschits (Switzerland) P Schnyder	7	7
(United Kingdom) A Keothavong (Japan) A Morita	4	6	[7]
(Sweden) S Arvidsson (Slovenia) A Klepač	6	3	[10]
(Belarus) T Poutchek (Turkey) İ Şenoğlu	3	1
3	(United States) R Kops-Jones (United States) A Spears	6	6
(Australia) C Dellacqua (Australia) A Rodionova	6	6
(Bosnia and Herzegovina) M Jugić-Salkić (Croatia) D Jurak	3	4
(Finland) E Laine (Tunisia) S Sfar	6^{7}	1
2	(Poland) K Jans (Poland) A Rosolska	7	6

Quarterfinals
1	(United States) L Huber (United States) L Raymond	2	3
(Czech Republic) A Hlaváčková (Kazakhstan) G Voskoboeva	6	6
(Russia) E Bovina (Estonia) K Kanepi	6	7
(Austria) S Klemenschits (Switzerland) P Schnyder	4	5
(Sweden) S Arvidsson (Slovenia) A Klepač	7	7
3	(United States) R Kops-Jones (United States) A Spears	6^{3}	5
(Australia) C Dellacqua (Australia) A Rodionova	4	6^{5}
2	(Poland) K Jans (Poland) A Rosolska	6	7

Semifinals
(Czech Republic) A Hlaváčková (Kazakhstan) G Voskoboeva	7	6
(Russia) E Bovina (Estonia) K Kanepi	5	1
(Sweden) S Arvidsson (Slovenia) A Klepač	4	4
2	(Poland) K Jans (Poland) A Rosolska	6	6

Finals
(Czech Republic) A Hlaváčková (Kazakhstan) G Voskoboeva	3	6	[10]
2	(Poland) K Jans (Poland) A Rosolska	6	0	[5]
