= 2013 Brussels Open – Singles =

Singles
- 2013 Brussels Open
- 2012 Champion: (Poland) Agnieszka Radwańska

Final
- Champion: (Estonia) Kaia Kanepi
- Runner-up: (China) Peng Shuai
- Score: 6–2, 7–5

Details
- Draw: 30
- Seeds: 8

Events
Singles	Doubles
← 2012 ·	Brussels Open

Agnieszka Radwańska was the defending champion but decided not to participate.

Kaia Kanepi won the title, defeating Peng Shuai 6–2, 7–5 in the final.

== Seeds ==
The top two seeds receive a bye into the second round.

1. (Denmark) Caroline Wozniacki (second round)
2. (Italy) Roberta Vinci (quarterfinals)
3. (Slovakia) Dominika Cibulková (first round)
4. (United States) Sloane Stephens (quarterfinals)
5. (Belgium) Kirsten Flipkens (second round)
6. (Germany) Julia Görges (second round, retired)
7. (United States) Varvara Lepchenko (quarterfinals)
8. (China) Peng Shuai (final)

== Draw ==
=== Key ===
- Q = Qualifier
- WC = Wild card
- LL = Lucky loser
- Alt = Alternate
- ITF = ITF entry
- PR = Protected ranking
- SR = Special ranking
- SE = Special exempt
- JE = Junior exempt
- JR = Junior Accelerator Programme entrant
- CO = College Accelerator Programme entrant
- NG = Next Gen Accelerator Program entrant
- w/o = Walkover
- r = Retired
- d = Defaulted

=== Finals ===
Semifinals
(Switzerland) Romina Oprandi	4	6	4
8	(China) Peng Shuai	6	2	6
(Estonia) Kaia Kanepi	7^{8}	6
(United States) Jamie Hampton	6^{6}	4

Final
8	(China) Peng Shuai	2	5
(Estonia) Kaia Kanepi	6	7

=== Top half ===
First round
(China) J Zheng	6	4	6
Q	(United States) M Burdette	2	6	3
(Switzerland) R Oprandi	6	6
Q	(United States) M Oudin	2	2
LL	(United States) C Vandeweghe	1	5
6	(Germany) J Görges	6	7
4	(United States) S Stephens	6	2	6
(Bulgaria) T Pironkova	3	6	3
Q	(China) S Zhang	6	6
(Slovakia) M Rybáriková	1	3
(Belarus) O Govortsova	6	7
(Netherlands) A Rus	2	5
(Sweden) S Arvidsson	3	0
8	(China) S Peng	6	6

Second round
1/WC	(Denmark) C Wozniacki	2	4
(China) J Zheng	6	6
(Switzerland) R Oprandi	6	0
6	(Germany) J Görges	3	0^{r}
4	(United States) S Stephens	6	6
Q	(China) S Zhang	4	0
(Belarus) O Govortsova	6	6^{4}	6^{4}
8	(China) S Peng	4	7^{7}	7^{7}

Quarterfinals
(China) J Zheng	3	6	0
(Switzerland) R Oprandi	6	3	6
4	(United States) S Stephens	2	3
8	(China) S Peng	6	6

Semifinals
(Switzerland) R Oprandi	4	6	4
8	(China) S Peng	6	2	6

=== Bottom half ===
First round
7	(United States) V Lepchenko	6	6^{8}	6
(Serbia) B Jovanovski	2	7^{10}	4
WC	(United Kingdom) E Baltacha	7^{11}	7
(Switzerland) S Vögele	6^{9}	5
(Slovakia) J Čepelová	5	6	7
(Ukraine) L Tsurenko	7	3	5
(Estonia) K Kanepi	6	7^{8}
3	(Slovakia) D Cibulková	4	6^{6}
5	(Belgium) K Flipkens	6	1	6
(United States) M Keys	4	6	2
(Belgium) Y Wickmayer	6	3	4
(United States) J Hampton	1	6	6
Q	(Kazakhstan) Y Putintseva	6	6
WC	(Belgium) A Van Uytvanck	1	0

Second round
7	(United States) V Lepchenko	6	6
WC	(United Kingdom) E Baltacha	2	0
(Slovakia) J Čepelová	3	3
(Estonia) K Kanepi	6	6
5	(Belgium) K Flipkens	4	6	5
(United States) J Hampton	6	3	7
Q	(Kazakhstan) Y Putintseva	3	7	2
2	(Italy) R Vinci	6	5	6

Quarterfinals
7	(United States) V Lepchenko	3	6	6^{4}
(Estonia) K Kanepi	6	4	7^{7}
(United States) J Hampton	5	6	7
2	(Italy) R Vinci	7	3	5

Semifinals
(Estonia) K Kanepi	7^{8}	6
(United States) J Hampton	6^{6}	4

== Qualifying ==
=== Seeds ===
1. (United States) Mallory Burdette (qualified)
2. (Croatia) Mirjana Lučić-Baroni (first round)
3. (United States) Melanie Oudin (qualified)
4. (United States) Coco Vandeweghe (qualifying competition, lucky loser)
5. (Czech Republic) Kristýna Plíšková (second round)
6. (Portugal) Maria João Koehler (qualifying competition)
7. (Kazakhstan) Yulia Putintseva (qualified)
8. (United States) Alexa Glatch (first round)

=== Qualifiers ===
1. (United States) Mallory Burdette
2. (China) Zhang Shuai
3. (United States) Melanie Oudin
4. (Kazakhstan) Yulia Putintseva

=== Lucky losers ===
1. (United States) Coco Vandeweghe

=== Qualifying draw ===
==== First qualifier ====
First round
1	(United States) Mallory Burdette	7	6
WC	(Belgium) Elyne Boeykens	5	4
(Bulgaria) Dia Evtimova	2	2
WC	(United States) Taylor Townsend	6	6
(United States) Jill Craybas	2	4
(Georgia (country)) Oksana Kalashnikova	6	6
(Netherlands) Lesley Kerkhove	4	6	3
6	(Portugal) Maria João Koehler	6	2	6

Second round
1	(United States) Mallory Burdette	6	7^{7}
WC	(United States) Taylor Townsend	4	6^{2}
(Georgia (country)) Oksana Kalashnikova	1	3
6	(Portugal) Maria João Koehler	6	6

Qualifying competition
1	(United States) Mallory Burdette	4	6	6
6	(Portugal) Maria João Koehler	6	3	0

==== Second qualifier ====
First round
2	(Croatia) Mirjana Lučić-Baroni	5	3
(Ukraine) Nadiya Kichenok	7	6
(China) Zhang Shuai	6	7
(Hungary) Melinda Czink	4	5
(Israel) Shahar Pe'er	6	7
(Slovakia) Kristina Kučová	4	5
(Hungary) Gréta Arn	3	4
5	(Czech Republic) Kristýna Plíšková	6	6

Second round
(Ukraine) Nadiya Kichenok	3	6	1
(China) Zhang Shuai	6	3	6
(Israel) Shahar Pe'er	6	6
5	(Czech Republic) Kristýna Plíšková	0	2

Qualifying competition
(China) Zhang Shuai	7^{7}	6
(Israel) Shahar Pe'er	6^{5}	2

==== Third qualifier ====
First round
3	(United States) Melanie Oudin	6	6
(Russia) Irina Khromacheva	1	0
(United States) Jennifer Elie	6	6
WC	(Greece) Valentini Grammatikopoulou	4	1
(Canada) Gabriela Dabrowski	6	6
WC	(Belgium) Ysaline Bonaventure	2	3
(Belarus) Aliaksandra Sasnovich	5	6	6
8	(United States) Alexa Glatch	7	4	3

Second round
3	(United States) Melanie Oudin	6	6
(United States) Jennifer Elie	2	1
(Canada) Gabriela Dabrowski	3	4
(Belarus) Aliaksandra Sasnovich	6	6

Qualifying competition
3	(United States) Melanie Oudin	6	7^{7}
(Belarus) Aliaksandra Sasnovich	2	6^{1}

==== Fourth qualifier ====
First round
4	(United States) Coco Vandeweghe	6	6
(Ukraine) Lyudmyla Kichenok	3	2
(Australia) Olivia Rogowska	6	6
(Russia) Valeria Solovyeva	3	1
(Portugal) Michelle Larcher de Brito	6	6
(Poland) Alicja Rosolska	3	2
(Japan) Shuko Aoyama	1	0
7	(Kazakhstan) Yulia Putintseva	6	6

Second round
4	(United States) Coco Vandeweghe	7^{7}	7
(Australia) Olivia Rogowska	6^{2}	5
(Portugal) Michelle Larcher de Brito	4	1
7	(Kazakhstan) Yulia Putintseva	6	6

Qualifying competition
4	(United States) Coco Vandeweghe	6	1	1
7	(Kazakhstan) Yulia Putintseva	4	6	6
