= 2013 Brussels Open – Doubles =

Women's tennis tournament

Doubles
- 2013 Brussels Open
- 2012 Champions: (United States) Bethanie Mattek-Sands (India) Sania Mirza

Final
- Champions: (Germany) Anna-Lena Grönefeld (Czech Republic) Květa Peschke
- Runners-up: (Canada) Gabriela Dabrowski (Israel) Shahar Pe'er
- Score: 6–0, 6–3

Details
- Draw: 16
- Seeds: 4

Events
Singles	Doubles
← 2012 ·	Brussels Open

Bethanie Mattek-Sands and Sania Mirza were the defending champions but Mattek-Sands decided not to participate.
Mirza played alongside Zheng Jie, but lost in the semifinals to Gabriela Dabrowski and Shahar Pe'er.
Anna-Lena Grönefeld and Květa Peschke won the title, defeating Dabrowski and Pe'er in the final, 6–0, 6–3.

== Seeds ==
1. (India) Sania Mirza / (China) Zheng Jie (semifinals)
2. (Germany) Anna-Lena Grönefeld / (Czech Republic) Květa Peschke (champions)
3. (Chinese Taipei) Chan Hao-ching / (Croatia) Darija Jurak (first round)
4. (Belarus) Olga Govortsova / (Poland) Alicja Rosolska (semifinals)

== Draw ==
=== Key ===
- Q = Qualifier
- WC = Wild card
- LL = Lucky loser
- Alt = Alternate
- ITF = ITF entry
- PR = Protected ranking
- SR = Special ranking
- SE = Special exempt
- JE = Junior exempt
- JR = Junior Accelerator Programme entrant
- CO = College Accelerator Programme entrant
- NG = Next Gen Accelerator Program entrant
- w/o = Walkover
- r = Retired
- d = Defaulted

=== Draw ===
First round
1	(India) S Mirza (China) J Zheng	6	6
(Czech Republic) E Hrdinová (United States) L Lee-Waters	2	4
(Japan) S Aoyama (Thailand) T Tanasugarn	4	4
(Latvia) L Dekmeijere (Georgia (country)) O Kalashnikova	6	6
3	(Chinese Taipei) H-c Chan (Croatia) D Jurak	1	4
(Canada) G Dabrowski (Israel) S Pe'er	6	6
(United States) L Huber (Czech Republic) K Plíšková	3	6	[8]
WC	(Belgium) K Flipkens (Slovakia) M Rybáriková	6	2	[10]
(Russia) M Melnikova (Belarus) A Sasnovich	6	7
(Ukraine) V Kapshay (Russia) M Kondratieva	3	5
(Hungary) M Czink (Serbia) B Jovanovski	1	1
4	(Belarus) O Govortsova (Poland) A Rosolska	6	6
(Austria) S Klemenschits (Slovenia) A Klepač	6	6
(United States) J Elie (United Kingdom) N Slater	3	2
(United States) J Craybas (United States) C Vandeweghe	2	3
2	(Germany) A-L Grönefeld (Czech Republic) K Peschke	6	6

Quarterfinals
1	(India) S Mirza (China) J Zheng	6	6
(Latvia) L Dekmeijere (Georgia (country)) O Kalashnikova	2	3
(Canada) G Dabrowski (Israel) S Pe'er	7	7
WC	(Belgium) K Flipkens (Slovakia) M Rybáriková	5	5
(Russia) M Melnikova (Belarus) A Sasnovich	2	2
4	(Belarus) O Govortsova (Poland) A Rosolska	6	6
(Austria) S Klemenschits (Slovenia) A Klepač	2	2
2	(Germany) A-L Grönefeld (Czech Republic) K Peschke	6	6

Semifinals
1	(India) S Mirza (China) J Zheng	4	7	[7]
(Canada) G Dabrowski (Israel) S Pe'er	6	5	[10]
4	(Belarus) O Govortsova (Poland) A Rosolska	4	3
2	(Germany) A-L Grönefeld (Czech Republic) K Peschke	6	6

Final
(Canada) G Dabrowski (Israel) S Pe'er	0	3
2	(Germany) A-L Grönefeld (Czech Republic) K Peschke	6	6
