= 2011 Brussels Open – Singles qualifying =

This article displays the qualifying draw of the 2011 Brussels Open.

== Players ==
=== Seeds ===
1. (Estonia) Kaia Kanepi (qualified)
2. (Czech Republic) Andrea Hlaváčková (second round)
3. (Czech Republic) Sandra Záhlavová (second round)
4. (United Kingdom) Anne Keothavong (second round)
5. (United States) Irina Falconi (qualifying competition) (lucky loser)
6. (Georgia (country)) Oksana Kalashnikova (second round)
7. (Israel) Julia Glushko (second round)
8. (Germany) Laura Siegemund (second round)

=== Qualifiers ===
1. (Estonia) Kaia Kanepi
2. (United States) Abigail Spears
3. (Belgium) Alison van Uytvanck
4. (Kazakhstan) Galina Voskoboeva

=== Lucky losers ===
1. (United States) Irina Falconi

== Qualifying draw ==
=== First qualifier ===
First round					Second round					Qualifying competition
					1/WC	(Estonia) Kaia Kanepi	6	6
	(Colombia) Mariana Duque	4	6	6		(Colombia) Mariana Duque	3	4
WC	(Ukraine) Elina Svitolina	6	0	0						1/WC	(Estonia) Kaia Kanepi	7	6
	(Poland) Marta Domachowska	6	7								(Poland) Marta Domachowska	6^{5}	3
	(Russia) Elena Bovina	1	5			(Poland) Marta Domachowska	6	3	6
					7	(Israel) Julia Glushko	4	6	1

=== Second qualifier ===
First round					Second round				Qualifying competition
					2	(Czech Republic) Andrea Hlaváčková	2	6^{5}
	(Argentina) Paula Ormaechea	6	6			(Argentina) Paula Ormaechea	6	7
	(Colombia) Catalina Castaño	2	2							(Argentina) Paula Ormaechea	1	1
WC	(United States) Abigail Spears	7	2	6					WC	(United States) Abigail Spears	6	6
WC	(China) Yan Zi	6^{4}	6	4	WC	(United States) Abigail Spears	7	6
					6	(Georgia (country)) Oksana Kalashnikova	6^{6}	4

=== Third qualifier ===
First round				Second round					Qualifying competition
				3	(Czech Republic) Sandra Záhlavová	3	5
	(Chinese Taipei) Hsieh Su-wei	6	6		(Chinese Taipei) Hsieh Su-wei	6	7
	(Finland) Emma Laine	0	4							(Chinese Taipei) Hsieh Su-wei	4	6	4
	(Georgia (country)) Margalita Chakhnashvili	3	2						WC	(Belgium) Alison van Uytvanck	6	2	6
WC	(Belgium) Alison van Uytvanck	6	6	WC	(Belgium) Alison van Uytvanck	2	6	6
				8	(Germany) Laura Siegemund	6	4	3

=== Fourth qualifier ===
First round					Second round				Qualifying competition
					4	(United Kingdom) Anne Keothavong	3	0
	(Kazakhstan) Galina Voskoboeva	6	2	6		(Kazakhstan) Galina Voskoboeva	6	6
WC	(Belgium) Valerie Verhamme	0	6	2						(Kazakhstan) Galina Voskoboeva	6	6
	(Bosnia and Herzegovina) Jasmina Tinjić	2	6	2					5	(United States) Irina Falconi	3	2
	(Slovenia) Andreja Klepač	6	2	6		(Slovenia) Andreja Klepač	3	0
					5	(United States) Irina Falconi	6	6
