= 2012 Brussels Open – Doubles =

Doubles
- 2012 Brussels Open

Final
- Champions: (United States) Bethanie Mattek-Sands (India) Sania Mirza
- Runners-up: (Poland) Alicja Rosolska (China) Zheng Jie
- Score: 6–3, 6–2

Details
- Draw: 16
- Seeds: 4

Events
Singles	Doubles
← 2011 ·	Brussels Open	· 2013 →

Andrea Hlaváčková and Galina Voskoboeva were the defending champions but decided not to participate.
Bethanie Mattek-Sands and Sania Mirza won the title defeating Alicja Rosolska and Zheng Jie 6–3, 6–2 in the final.

== Seeds ==
1. (Czech Republic) Květa Peschke / (Slovenia) Katarina Srebotnik (first round)
2. (United States) Raquel Kops-Jones / (United States) Abigail Spears (first round)
3. (Poland) Alicja Rosolska / (China) Zheng Jie (final)
4. (United States) Bethanie Mattek-Sands / (India) Sania Mirza (champions)

== Draw ==
=== Key ===
- Q = Qualifier
- WC = Wild card
- LL = Lucky loser
- Alt = Alternate
- ITF = ITF entry
- PR = Protected ranking
- SR = Special ranking
- SE = Special exempt
- JE = Junior exempt
- JR = Junior Accelerator Programme entrant
- CO = College Accelerator Programme entrant
- NG = Next Gen Accelerator Program entrant
- w/o = Walkover
- r = Retired
- d = Defaulted

=== Draw ===
First round
1	(Czech Republic) K Peschke (Slovenia) K Srebotnik	6	2	[8]
(Croatia) D Jurak (Hungary) K Marosi	1	6	[10]
(Ukraine) K Bondarenko (Romania) M Niculescu	6	7
Alt	(Ukraine) V Kapshay (Slovakia) L Wienerová	4	5
3	(Poland) A Rosolska (China) J Zheng	6	6
(United States) L Lee-Waters (United States) M Moulton-Levy	1	4
(Greece) E Daniilidou (Czech Republic) E Hrdinová	4	6	[4]
(Latvia) L Dekmeijere (Russia) M Kondratieva	6	3	[10]
(Colombia) C Castaño (France) S Lefèvre	6	6^{10}	[6]
WC	(Russia) E Bovina (Belgium) A Van Uytvanck	2	7^{12}	[10]
(Bosnia and Herzegovina) M Jugić-Salkić (Austria) S Klemenschits	4	2
4	(United States) B Mattek-Sands (India) S Mirza	6	6
(United States) C McHale (United States) M Oudin	6	4	[10]
(Australia) D Jeflea (Australia) S Peers	3	6	[8]
(Australia) C Dellacqua (Australia) A Rodionova	7^{7}	6
2	(United States) R Kops-Jones (United States) A Spears	6^{3}	2

Quarterfinals
(Croatia) D Jurak (Hungary) K Marosi	1	6^{2}
(Ukraine) K Bondarenko (Romania) M Niculescu	6	7^{7}
3	(Poland) A Rosolska (China) J Zheng	6	6
(Latvia) L Dekmeijere (Russia) M Kondratieva	4	3
WC	(Russia) E Bovina (Belgium) A Van Uytvanck	2	6	[1]
4	(United States) B Mattek-Sands (India) S Mirza	6	3	[10]
(United States) C McHale (United States) M Oudin	1	5
(Australia) C Dellacqua (Australia) A Rodionova	6	7

Semifinals
(Ukraine) K Bondarenko (Romania) M Niculescu	2	6^{5}
3	(Poland) A Rosolska (China) J Zheng	6	7^{7}
4	(United States) B Mattek-Sands (India) S Mirza	6	4	[10]
(Australia) C Dellacqua (Australia) A Rodionova	3	6	[5]

Final
3	(Poland) A Rosolska (China) J Zheng	3	2
4	(United States) B Mattek-Sands (India) S Mirza	6	6
