= 2011 Brussels Open =

- Date: 14–21 May
- Edition: 1st
- Category: WTA Premier tournaments
- Draw: 30S / 16D
- Prize money: $618,000
- Surface: Clay / outdoor
- Location: Brussels, Belgium

Champions

Singles
- (Denmark) Caroline Wozniacki

Doubles
- (Czech Republic) Andrea Hlaváčková / (Kazakhstan) Galina Voskoboeva
Brussels Open	· 2012 →

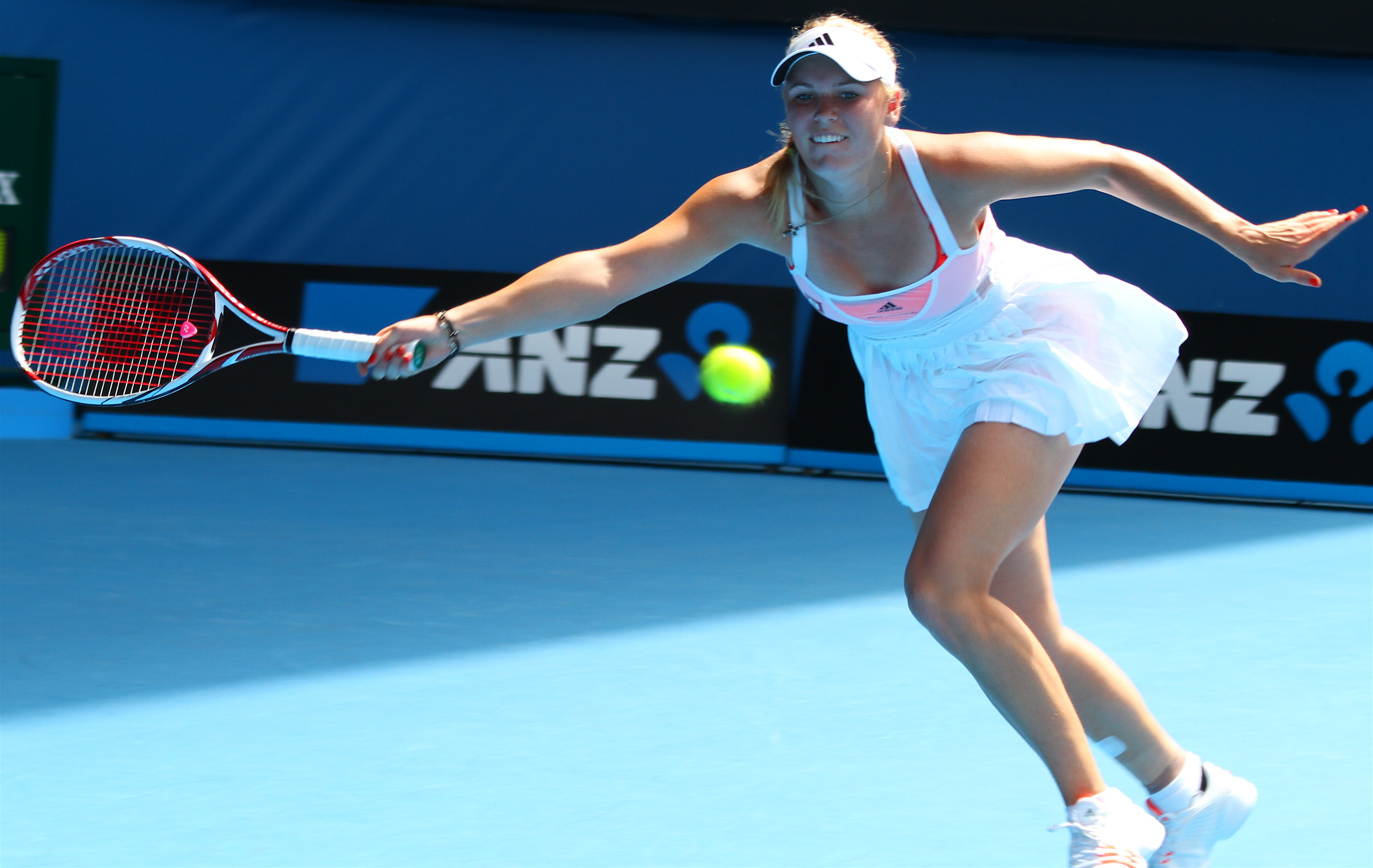
Caroline Wozniacki at the 2011 Australian Open2

The 2011 Brussels Open, also known as the Brussels Open by GDF Suez for sponsor reasons, was a women's tennis tournament played on outdoor clay courts. It was the first edition of the Brussels Open, and was part of the Premier-level tournaments of the 2011 WTA Tour. The event took place at the Royal Primerose Tennis Club in Brussels, Belgium, from 14 May until 21 May 2011. First-seeded Caroline Wozniacki won the singles title.

== Finals ==
=== Singles ===
(Denmark) Caroline Wozniacki defeated (China) Peng Shuai 2–6, 6–3, 6–3

- It was Wozniacki's 16th career title and 4th of the year.

=== Doubles ===
(Czech Republic) Andrea Hlaváčková / (Kazakhstan) Galina Voskoboeva defeated (Poland) Klaudia Jans / (Poland) Alicja Rosolska 3–6, 6–0, [10–5]

== Prize money and ranking points ==
Stage	Singles' Prize Money	Points	Doubles' Prize Money
Champion	$ 103,000	470	$ 32,000
Runner-up	$ 55,000	320	$ 17,000
Semifinals	$ 29,500	200	$ 9,250
Quarterfinals	$ 15,675	120	$ 4,850
Round of 16	$ 8,500	60	$ 2,600
Round of 32	$ 4,650	1	-
Qualifier	-	20	-
Final round qualifying	$ 2,500	12	-
Second round qualifying	$ 1,350	8	-
First round qualifying	$ 725	1	-

== Entrants ==
=== Seeds ===
Country	Player	Rank^{1}	Seed
DEN	Caroline Wozniacki	1	1
RUS	Vera Zvonareva	3	2
ITA	Francesca Schiavone	5	3
SRB	Jelena Janković	9	4
ISR	Shahar Pe'er	14	5
BEL	Yanina Wickmayer	24	6
ROU	Alexandra Dulgheru	29	7
CHN	Peng Shuai	31	8

- Seedings are based on the rankings of May 9, 2011.

=== Other entrants ===
The following players received wildcards into the main draw:

- (Belgium) Kirsten Flipkens
- (Belgium) An-Sophie Mestach

The following players received entry from the qualifying draw:

- (Estonia) Kaia Kanepi
- (United States) Abigail Spears
- (Belgium) Alison van Uytvanck
- (Kazakhstan) Galina Voskoboeva

The following players received entry from a lucky loser spot:

- (United States) Irina Falconi
