= 2012 Brussels Open =

- Date: 19–26 May
- Edition: 2nd
- Category: WTA Premier tournaments
- Draw: 30S / 16D
- Prize money: $637,000
- Surface: Clay / outdoor
- Location: Brussels, Belgium

Champions

Singles
- (Poland) Agnieszka Radwańska

Doubles
- (United States) Bethanie Mattek-Sands / (India) Sania Mirza
- Brussels Open

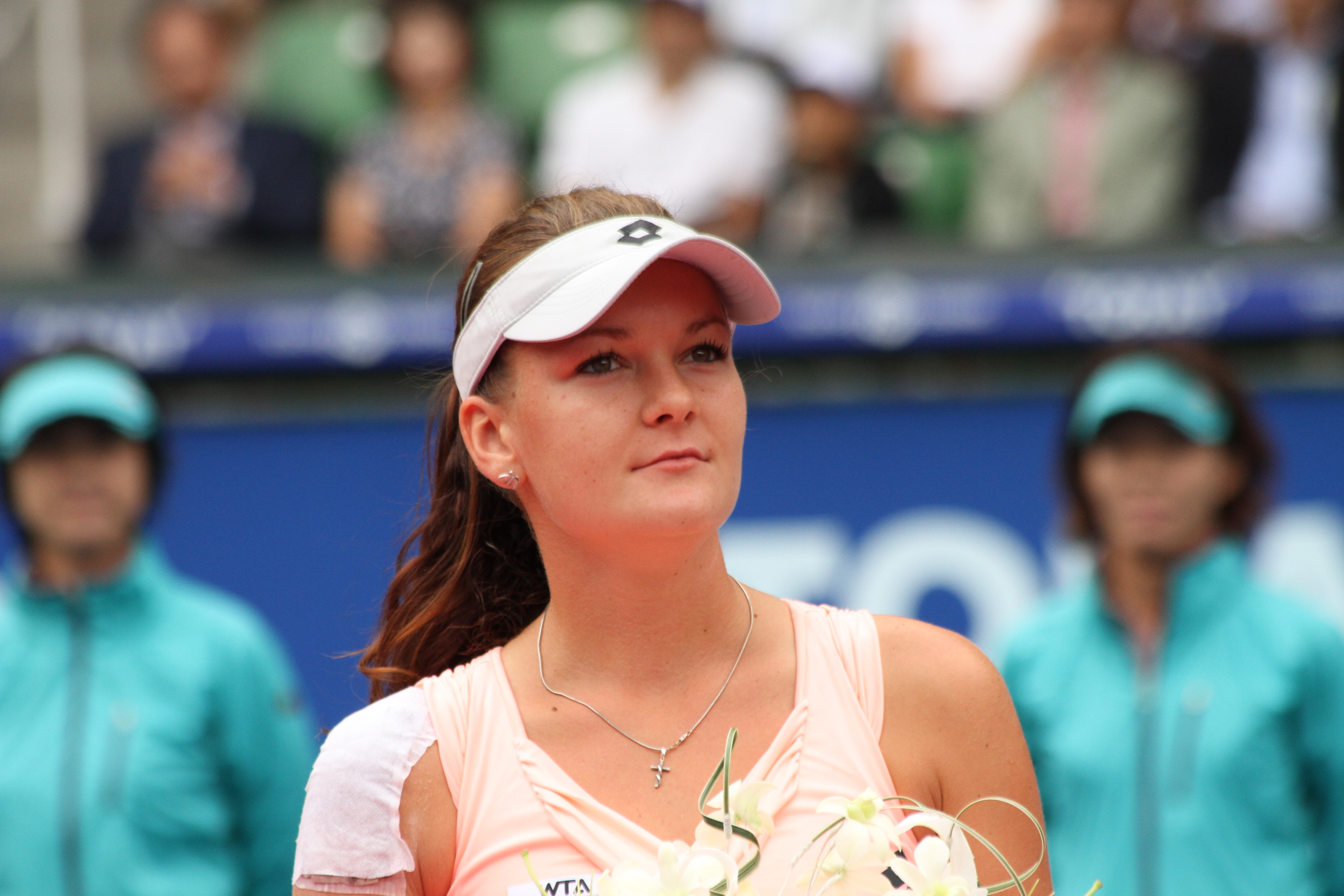
Agnieszka Radwanska at the Pan Pacific Open in 2011

The 2012 Brussels Open was a women's tennis tournament played on outdoor clay courts. It was the 2nd edition of the Brussels Open, and was part of the Premier-level tournaments of the 2012 WTA Tour. The event took place at the Royal Primerose Tennis Club in Brussels, Belgium, from 19 May through 26 May 2012. First-seeded Agnieszka Radwańska won the singles title.

== Finals ==
=== Singles ===
(Poland) Agnieszka Radwańska defeated (Romania) Simona Halep 7–5, 6–0

- It was Radwanska's 3rd title of the year and 10th of her career. It was her 3rd Premier-level tournament of her career and 6th Premier overall.

=== Doubles ===
(United States) Bethanie Mattek-Sands / (India) Sania Mirza defeated (Poland) Alicja Rosolska / (China) Zheng Jie 6–3, 6–2

== Singles main draw entrants ==
=== Seeds ===
Country	Player	Rank^{1}	Seed
POL	Agnieszka Radwańska	3	1
FRA	Marion Bartoli	7	2
~~GER~~	~~Angelique Kerber~~	~~11~~	~~3~~
SVK	Dominika Cibulková	17	4
~~ITA~~	~~Roberta Vinci~~	~~19~~	~~5~~
SRB	Jelena Janković	20	6
CHN	Peng Shuai	23	7
EST	Kaia Kanepi	25	8
RUS	Anastasia Pavlyuchenkova	26	9
RUS	Nadia Petrova	30	10

- Rankings as of May 14, 2012

=== Other entrants ===
The following players received wildcards into the main draw:

- (Belgium) Tamaryn Hendler
- (Serbia) Jelena Janković
- (Belgium) Alison van Uytvanck

The following players received entry from the qualifying draw:

- (United States) Irina Falconi
- (India) Sania Mirza
- (Poland) Urszula Radwańska
- (Netherlands) Arantxa Rus

The following players received entry as lucky losers:

- (Serbia) Bojana Jovanovski
- (Ukraine) Lesia Tsurenko

=== Withdrawals ===
- (Italy) Sara Errani
- (Slovakia) Daniela Hantuchová (foot stress fracture)
- (Germany) Angelique Kerber (low back injury)
- (Germany) Andrea Petkovic (ankle ligaments injury)
- (Italy) Roberta Vinci (right wrist injury)

=== Retirements ===
- (Netherlands) Arantxa Rus

== Doubles main draw entrants ==
=== Seeds ===
Country	Player	Country	Player	Rank^{1}	Seed
CZE	Květa Peschke	SLO	Katarina Srebotnik	7	1
USA	Raquel Kops-Jones	USA	Abigail Spears	46	2
POL	Alicja Rosolska	CHN	Zheng Jie	68	3
USA	Bethanie Mattek-Sands	IND	Sania Mirza	71	4

- ^{1} Rankings are as of May 14, 2012

=== Other entrants ===
The following pair received wildcard into the doubles main draw:

- (Russia) Elena Bovina / (Belgium) Alison Van Uytvanck

The following pair received entry as alternates:

- (Ukraine) Veronika Kapshay / (Slovakia) Lenka Wienerová

=== Withdrawals ===
- (Kazakhstan) Ksenia Pervak (knee injury)
