= Peng Shuai =

Chinese tennis player (born 1986)

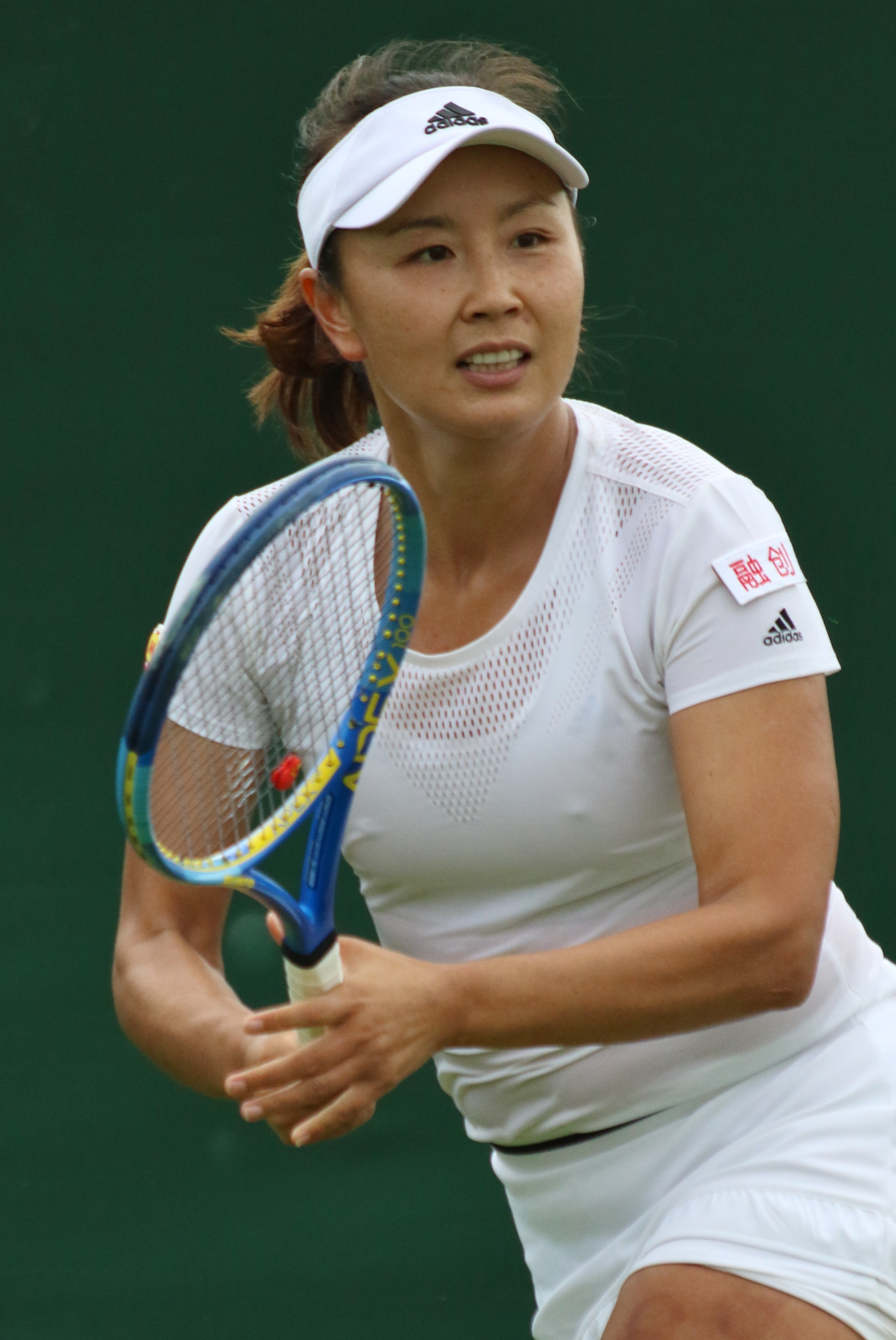
- Peng at the 2019 Wimbledon Qualifying
- Native name: 彭帅
- Country (sports): China
- Residence: Tianjin and Beijing, China
- Born: 8 January 1986 (age 40) Xiangtan, Hunan
- Height: 1.77 m (5 ft 10 in)
- Turned pro: 2001
- Retired: 2022
- Plays: Right (two-handed both sides)
- Coach: Carlos Rodríguez
- Prize money: $9,617,653

Singles
- Career record: 497–323
- Career titles: 2
- Highest ranking: No. 14 (22 August 2011)

Grand Slam singles results
- Australian Open: 4R (2011, 2015)
- French Open: 3R (2011, 2012)
- Wimbledon: 4R (2011, 2012, 2014)
- US Open: SF (2014)

Doubles
- Career record: 341–203
- Career titles: 23
- Highest ranking: No. 1 (17 February 2014)

Grand Slam doubles results
- Australian Open: F (2017)
- French Open: W (2014)
- Wimbledon: W (2013)
- US Open: SF (2017)

Other doubles tournaments
- Tour Finals: W (2013)

Team competitions
- Fed Cup: 17–9
Medal record
Asian Games
Gold medal – first place	2010 Guangzhou	Team
Gold medal – first place	2010 Guangzhou	Singles
Bronze medal – third place	2010 Guangzhou	Doubles

Peng Shuai
- Traditional Chinese: 彭帥
- Simplified Chinese: 彭帅
Transcriptions
Standard Mandarin
- Hanyu Pinyin: Péng Shuài
- IPA: [pʰə̌ŋ ʂwâɪ]

Peng Shuai (Chinese: 彭帅; pinyin: Péng Shuài; Mandarin pronunciation: [pʰə̌ŋ ʂwâɪ]; born 8 January 1986) is a Chinese former professional tennis player. In February 2014, she was ranked in doubles world No. 1 by the WTA, becoming the first Chinese tennis player to achieve that ranking in any discipline. She peaked at No. 14 of the singles rankings in August 2011, and won two singles and 23 doubles titles on the WTA Tour.

Peng won a gold medal at the 2010 Asian Games, defeating Akgul Amanmuradova in the singles final. At the 2013 Wimbledon Championships, Peng won her first major title, in women's doubles with Hsieh Su-wei. She also won the women's doubles title at the 2014 French Open with Hsieh. Her best performance at a major in singles came at the 2014 US Open where she reached the semifinals, becoming the third Chinese tennis player in history to reach a major semifinal after Zheng Jie and Li Na.

Peng was known for playing with two hands on both sides and hitting very flat. She defeated many top-10 and top-5 players, including Kim Clijsters, Martina Hingis, Amélie Mauresmo, Anastasia Myskina, Elena Dementieva, Francesca Schiavone, Jelena Janković, Agnieszka Radwańska, Marion Bartoli, and Vera Zvonareva.

In November 2021, in what was suspected to be a forced disappearance, Peng disappeared, after making a post on Weibo. It detailed a long-term affair involving Zhang Gaoli, a retired Chinese Vice Premier, who was reportedly accused of sexually assaulting her. The news became widely censored in China. International concerns for Peng grew, and the WTA suspended all its events in the country. Peng has made limited public appearances since the incident. Although unsatisfied with the case, WTA events returned to China in 2023.

== Early life ==
Peng Shuai was born in Xiangtan. She began playing at age eight when an uncle, a famous tennis coach in China and the only other family member who played tennis, introduced her to the game. She favors hardcourts and two-handed forehand (though her backhand is the better side). At age 13, Peng was admitted to a hospital for heart surgery to repair a defect, a situation which she explained in the 2008 "Impossible is Nothing" campaign from Adidas. Following surgery, in 1999 she joined the state training program in Tianjin aimed at producing internationally competitive athletes, especially Olympians.

== Career ==
=== 2001–2004: Debut on the ITF Circuit ===
In June 2001, the 15-year-old Peng won her first singles title at Baotou, a $10k tournament, defeating countrywoman Sun Tiantian in the semifinal. In October, she debuted on the WTA Tour at Shanghai as a wildcard.

In February 2002, Peng won her third $10k singles title. The following week, she extended her winning streak to twelve and reached the final of a $25k tournament at New Delhi before losing the championship match to Eva Birnerová. Further success proved elusive, and she took nearly seven months off from competition at singles events, ending the year with a world ranking of 358.

In 2003, she won her first $25k title at Jackson, Mississippi and her first $50k event at Changsha, improving her year-end ranking to 226.

In 2004, she won her first $75k tournament at Dothan, Alabama. She rose up to No. 107 in the rankings and gained her direct entry into her first major main draw at Wimbledon. She was defeated there by 14th seed Silvia Farina Elia. Peng reached her first WTA Tour quarterfinal at Cincinnati in August, where she lost to second seed Vera Zvonareva. By the end of 2004, Peng had won her eighth ITF Women's Circuit singles title at Shenzhen-2. She ended the year ranking 73 in the world and was able to focus solely on WTA Tour events thereafter.

=== 2005–2007: Solo ===
In the mid-2000s, Peng decided to "fly solo" and no longer give over half of her earnings to the state training program. She and three other Chinese players broke out of the state's control by effectively threatening to stop playing.

At the Australian Open, Peng won her first major singles match, defeating Maria Elena Camerin before being overcome by Venus Williams in the second round. In September 2005, she reached two further WTA quarterfinals at Beijing and Guangzhou, ultimately finishing the year ranking 37th.

In 2006, Peng lost her first-round ties at the Australian Open, withdrew from subsequent tournaments, and dropped out of the top 60, after losing at Indian Wells and Miami. At Wimbledon, however, she reached the third round of a major for the first time, defeating 20th seed Shahar Pe'er before losing to 16th seed Flavia Pennetta. She reached the semifinals of the China Open and represented her country for the first time in her Fed Cup career, winning both her ties against Indonesia.

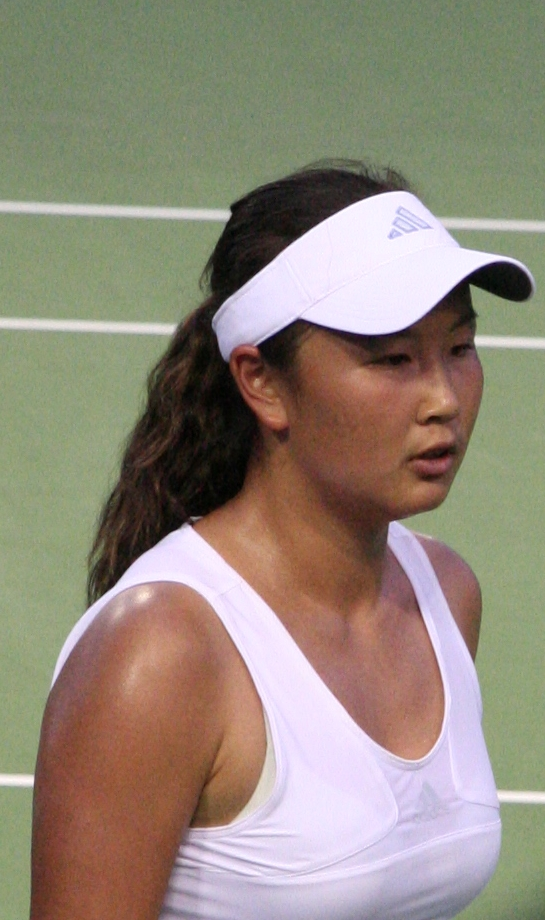
Peng Shuai at the 2007 Australian Open

In 2007, Peng failed to get past the second round of the Australian Open and the first round of the US Open but reached the semifinals of the Tier-III Pattaya Open, losing to Sybille Bammer. At the China Open, Peng beat former world No. 1 and five-time Grand Slam champion Martina Hingis in the final match of Hingis's professional career. She finished the year with a 26–21 record in singles, a doubles title in Guangzhou with Yan Zi, and one top-ten win against Amélie Mauresmo.

=== 2008–2010: New coach, doubles with Hsieh, injuries ===
After a string of losses in 2008, Peng recorded her first win of the year at the Tier-II Bangalore Open against Anne Kremer before losing to Venus Williams; she also won the doubles title with Sun Tiantian. At Strasbourg, she recorded a top-ten win when top seed Marion Bartoli was forced to retire in round one while trailing. Peng reached the second round of the US Open for the first time in her career, defeating Eleni Daniilidou before losing to Flavia Pennetta.

At the Summer Olympics, Peng competed in the women's singles, and the women's doubles with Sun Tiantian. The doubles pair were knocked out in the first round, and Peng lost to Alizé Cornet in the second round of the singles.

In early 2009, Peng announced that she will be coached full-time for the 2009 season by Tarik Benhabiles. She won the Sydney International doubles title with Hsieh Su-wei, defeating Nathalie Dechy and Casey Dellacqua in the final. At the Italian Open in May, Peng partnered with Hsieh again and won the doubles title by defeating Daniela Hantuchová and Ai Sugiyama. At the French Open, Peng was knocked out of the singles event but partnered with Hsieh to reach the semifinals in doubles, defeating Hantuchová & Sugiyama in the third round and the Radwańska sisters in the quarterfinals before losing to Victoria Azarenka and Elena Vesnina.

At the 2009 Wimbledon Championships, Peng fell to No. 11 Agnieszka Radwańska in the second round, after a mammoth battle of three and a half hours. Despite saving five match points, she eventually lost in three sets. Her 'never say die' attitude won her the admiration of many English fans. During the China Open, Peng defeated the 2008 champion and former world No. 1 Jelena Janković, who picked up a wrist injury in the latter stages of the match. In the third round, Peng won against former world No. 1 Maria Sharapova. In the quarterfinals, she lost to Nadia Petrova. In doubles, Peng partnered with Hsieh and won the title, bringing her ranking to a career high of 13.

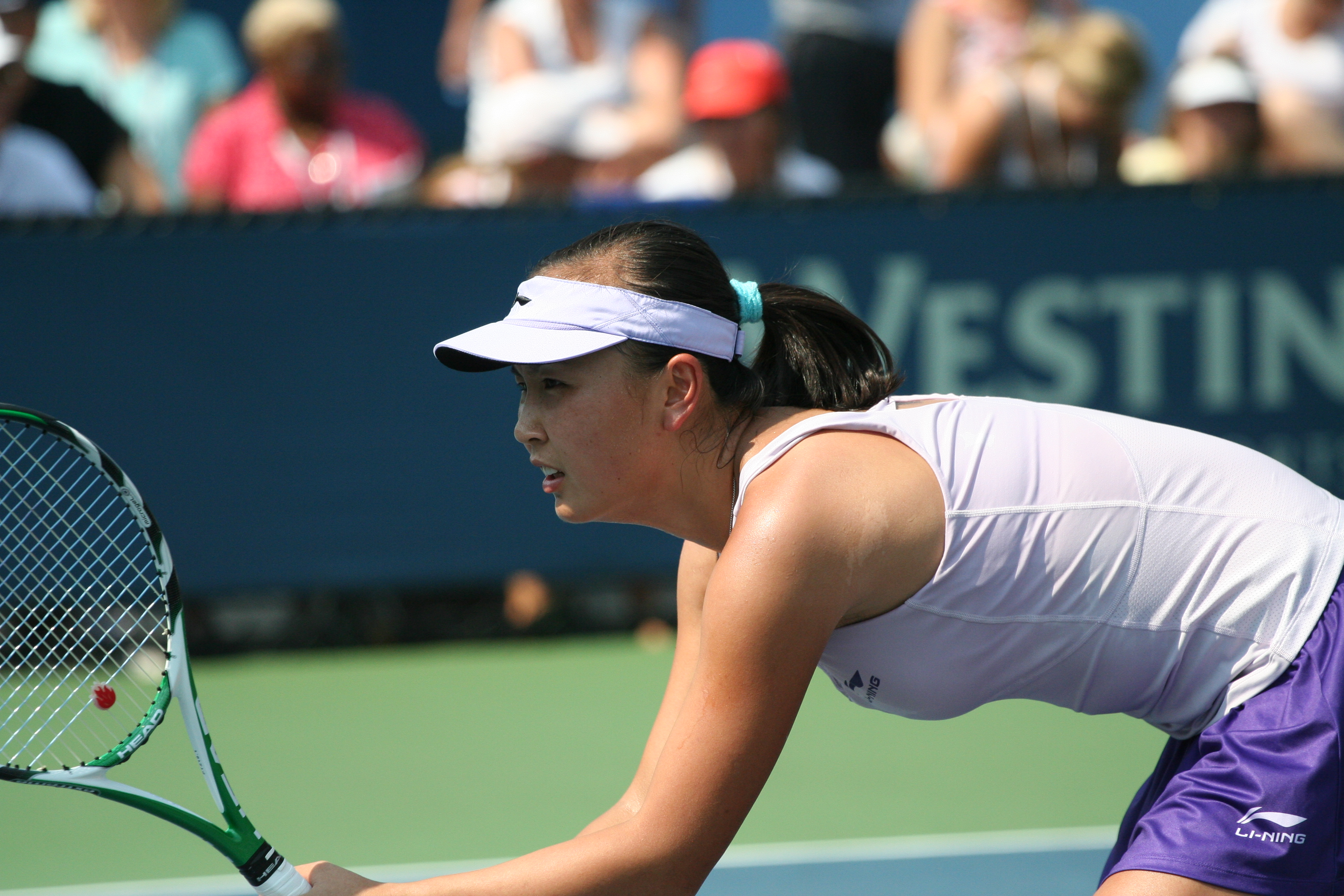
Peng at the 2010 US Open

At both the 2010 Hobart International and the Australian Open, Peng was stopped by Zheng Jie. Peng reached the second round of the Indian Wells Open and the semifinals at the Estoril Open. Afterwards, she suffered a series of injuries. In the first round of the Premier Mandatory Madrid Open, she had to retire due to a right adductor muscle strain. In the second round, she was defeated by Arantxa Parra Santonja. Peng then withdrew from the French Open and missed the whole of the grass-court season due to illness. In the US Open, Peng advanced to the third round before withdrawing from the tournament with injury. She then suffered two first-round exits at the Pan Pacific Open and the China Open, lowering her ranking to No. 95.

In the ITF Circuit, Peng won a trophy at the $100k event in Taipei and ended the season representing China in the 2010 Asian Games in Guangzhou. She won gold in the team event alongside Li Na, Yan Zi and Zhang Shuai. In the doubles event, she gained a bronze with partner Yan Zi, and in the singles event, she won another gold, defeating Akgul Amanmuradova of Uzbekistan.

=== 2011–2012: Singles career-high No. 14 ===
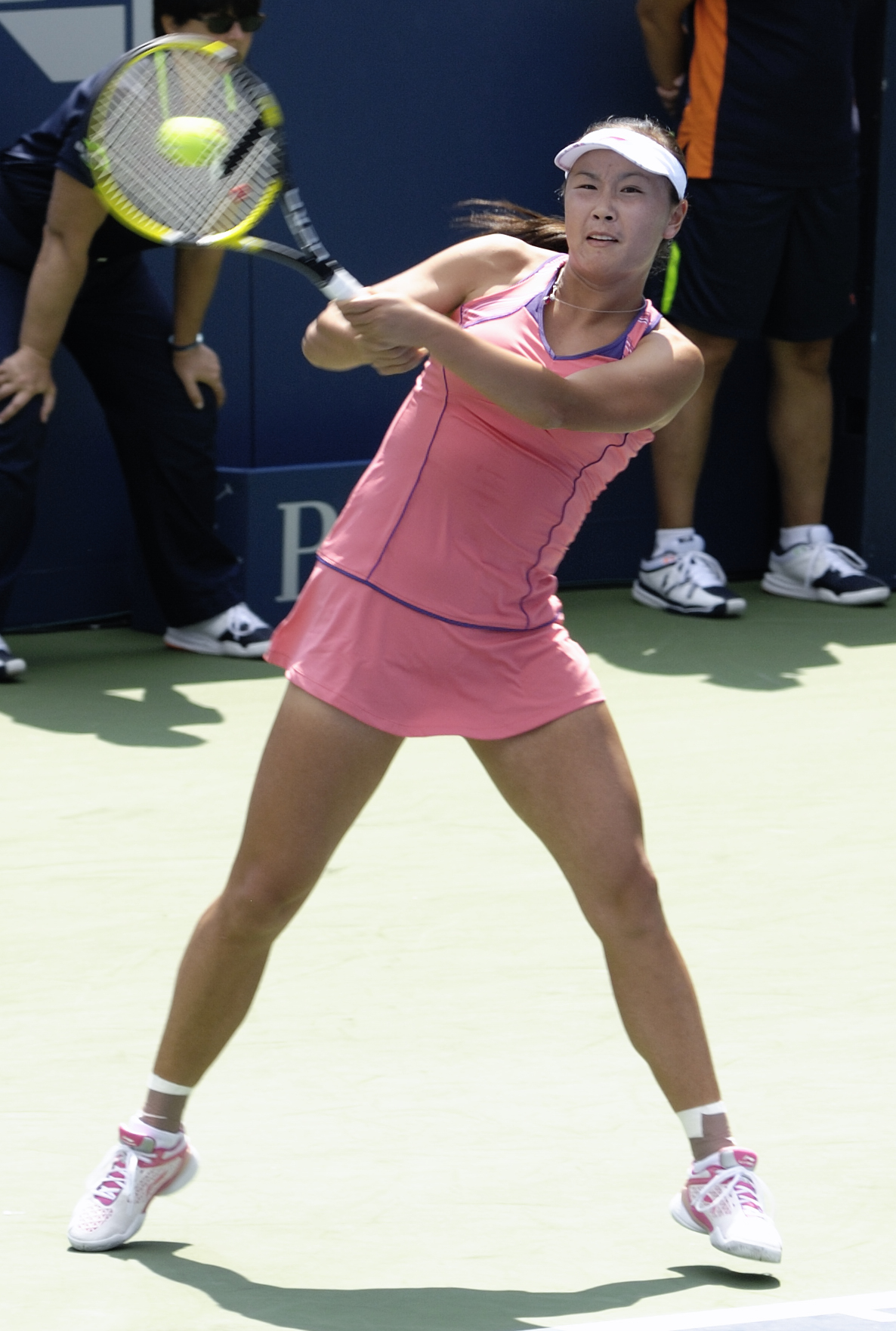
Peng in 2011

At the 2011 Auckland Open, Peng caused a big upset by defeating No. 3 seed Kuznetsova in the second round. At the Australian Open, she defeated Kateryna Bondarenko, Jelena Janković, and Ayumi Morita to reach the fourth round of a major for the first time in her career, before losing to Agnieszka Radwańska. Her ranking rose to No. 40. In the third round of the Indian Wells Open, she defeated No. 7 seed Li Na for the first time in her career. Peng reached the semifinals at the Family Circle Cup in Charleston, rising to a new career high of 29 in the world rankings. Peng also won the doubles title alongside Zheng Jie at the Italian Open.

Peng reached the finals at the Brussels Open but fell to world No. 1, Caroline Wozniacki. At the French Open, Peng retired due to illness in the third round. At Wimbledon, she reached the round of 16 before losing to the fifth seed and eventual runner-up Maria Sharapova. Posting good results at Cincinnati, Peng reached her career-high ranking of world No. 14. After withdrawing due to an injury from the US Open Series, she reached the round of 16 at the US Open before losing to Flavia Pennetta.

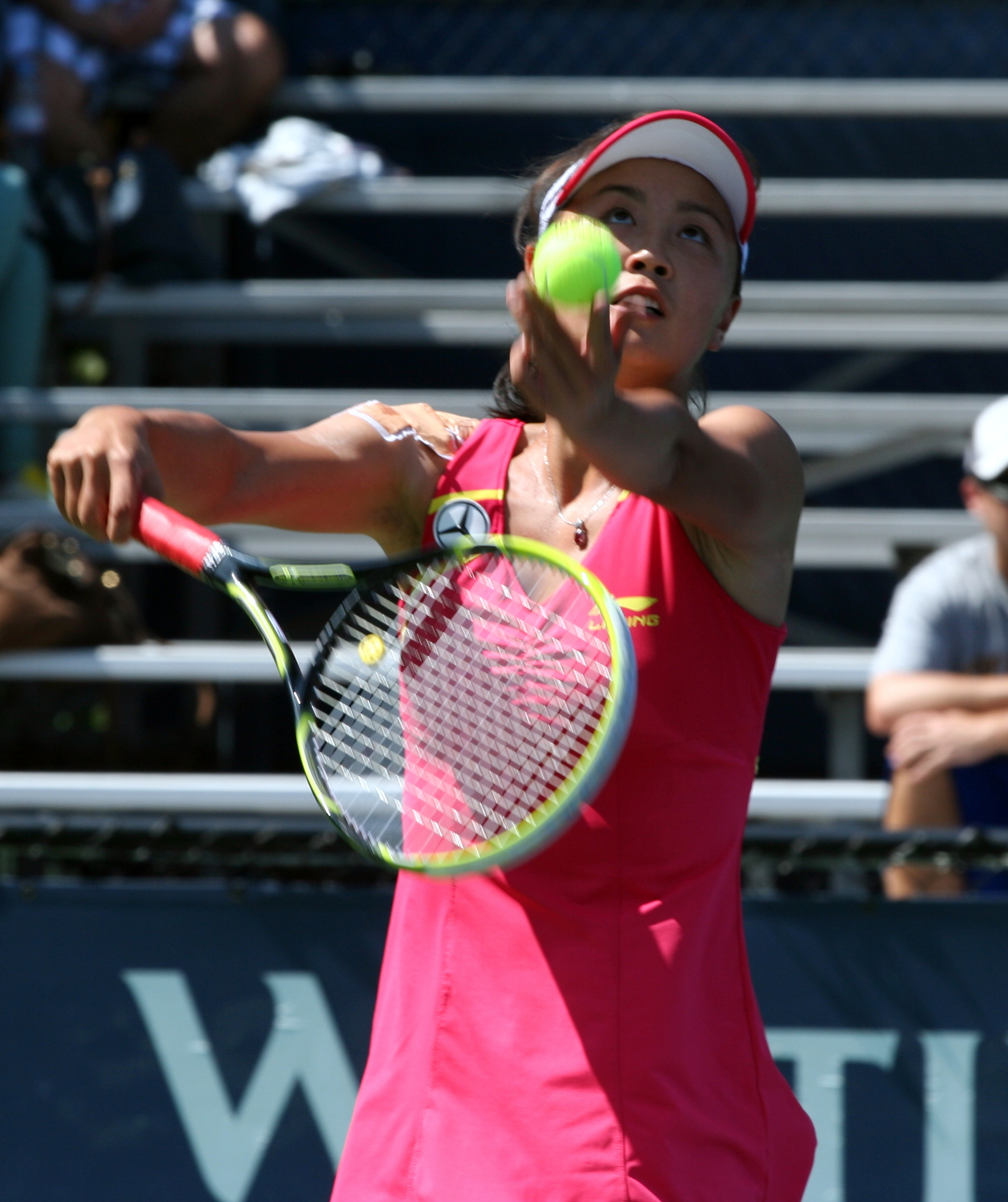
US Open – Tuesday, 28 August 2012

At both the 2012 Australian Open and the Dubai Championships, Peng fell in the second round. She took a month's break after her Malaysian Open and returned to play in the Madrid Open. However, she lost in early rounds in Madrid, Rome, and Brussels. At the Wimbledon Championships, she defeated Sandra Zaniewska, Ayumi Morita and Arantxa Rus to reach her second consecutive round of 16 before losing to Maria Kirilenko. At the 2012 Summer Olympics, Peng reached the second round in the women's singles and the quarterfinals in the women's doubles, partnering with Zheng Jie.

=== 2013–2014: Doubles champion and world No. 1 ===
Peng started her 2013 season by reaching the semifinals in the new Shenzhen Open. She was not able to progress beyond the first or the second round, however, at Hobart International, the Australian Open, Madrid Open, Italian Open, and reached only the third round at Indian Wells. She reached the final in the Brussels Open, defeating Sofia Arvidsson, Olga Govortsova, Sloane Stephens, and Romina Oprandi before losing to Kaia Kanepi. Peng again lost in either the first or the second round at Roland Garros, Wimbledon, the US Open, and China Open. She ended the year with a ranking of 45.

On the other hand, Peng began her huge success as a doubles player in 2013. Paired with long-time childhood friend Hsieh Su-wei, Peng clinched five double's titles in 2013, including two Premier-5 events (Rome and Cincinnati), Wimbledon, and WTA Championships. Peng became the first Chinese player to win the WTA Tour Championships, and the fifth to win a Grand Slam title, after Zheng Jie, Yan Zi, Sun Tiantian and Li Na.

In 2014 Peng reached the final in the Shenzhen Open and lost to Li Na. At the Australian Open, she lost to Kurumi Nara in the opening round. She also lost in the second round in the doubles event with Hsieh against Shahar Pe'er and Sílvia Soler Espinosa. Peng then won two consecutive doubles titles, winning the Pattaya Open with Zhang Shuai defeating Alla Kudryavtseva and Anastasia Rodionova in the final, and winning the Qatar Ladies Open with Hsieh Su-wei defeating Květa Peschke and Katarina Srebotnik in the final. On 17 February, Peng became the world No. 1 in doubles, making her the first Chinese tennis player (man or woman, in singles or doubles) to reach world No. 1. Peng and Hsieh continued their success by winning three more titles in the season, including two Premiere Mandatory events (Indian Wells and Beijing) and French Open. In the Wimbledon Championships, they failed in defending their title and also lost their No. 1 ranking.

However, since Wimbledon, Peng found her pace in the singles events. She reached the last 16 at the Wimbledon Championships. She also clinched title in the 125k event in Nanchang. At the US Open, Peng made her first Grand Slam singles quarterfinal and semifinal appearances, defeating compatriot Zheng Jie, fourth-seeded Agnieszka Radwańska, 28th-seeded Roberta Vinci, 14th-seeded Lucie Šafářová, and rising star Belinda Bencic en route, all in straight sets. In the semifinal, she had to retire against tenth-seeded Caroline Wozniacki in the semifinal at 6–7, 3–4 down, when she suffered severe cramps due to heat illness and had to be taken off court in a wheelchair. She skipped playing the following Hong Kong Open to recover, but made promotional appearances there. She came back to the game in the Wuhan Open, China Open, and Tianjin Open.

Peng and Hsieh entered the WTA Finals as the second seed. They beat Garbiñe Muguruza/Carla Suárez Navarro and Alla Kudryavtseva/Anastasia Rodionova in straight sets to reach the final. However, they lost disastrously to Cara Black/Sania Mirza. They pairing then came to conclusion as Peng had previously announced during the US Open.

=== 2015: Injury ===
Peng had a difficult 2015 season. Due to injuries, she had a lot of first round or second round losses. Her best performance of the season was fourth round of the Australian Open, which tied her best performance, although she lost it to second seed and the eventual runner-up Maria Sharapova.

Peng failed to win even one doubles match in 2015. She started the season with her Tianjin teammate Xu Yifan in preparation for the 2016 Olympics, but ended up losing in the first round matches in the Shenzhen Open and Australian Open. In their first-round match in the Australian Open against Kimiko Date-Krumm and Casey Dellacqua, they wasted a 6–4, 5–0 lead, two match points in the second set and three more in the twelfth game of the final set and eventually lost to their opponents. Peng was particularly frustrated by Xu, who was constantly attacked by their opponents and making a lot of unforced errors, and decided to split the partnership. She played two more tournaments, with Květa Peschke at Dubai and Zarina Diyas at Madrid, but was not able to win a set.

After the first-round retirement to Polona Hercog in the first round of French Open, Peng announced the end of her 2015 season due to injuries in her back and waist.

=== 2016–2017: Comeback with singles titles, Australian doubles final ===
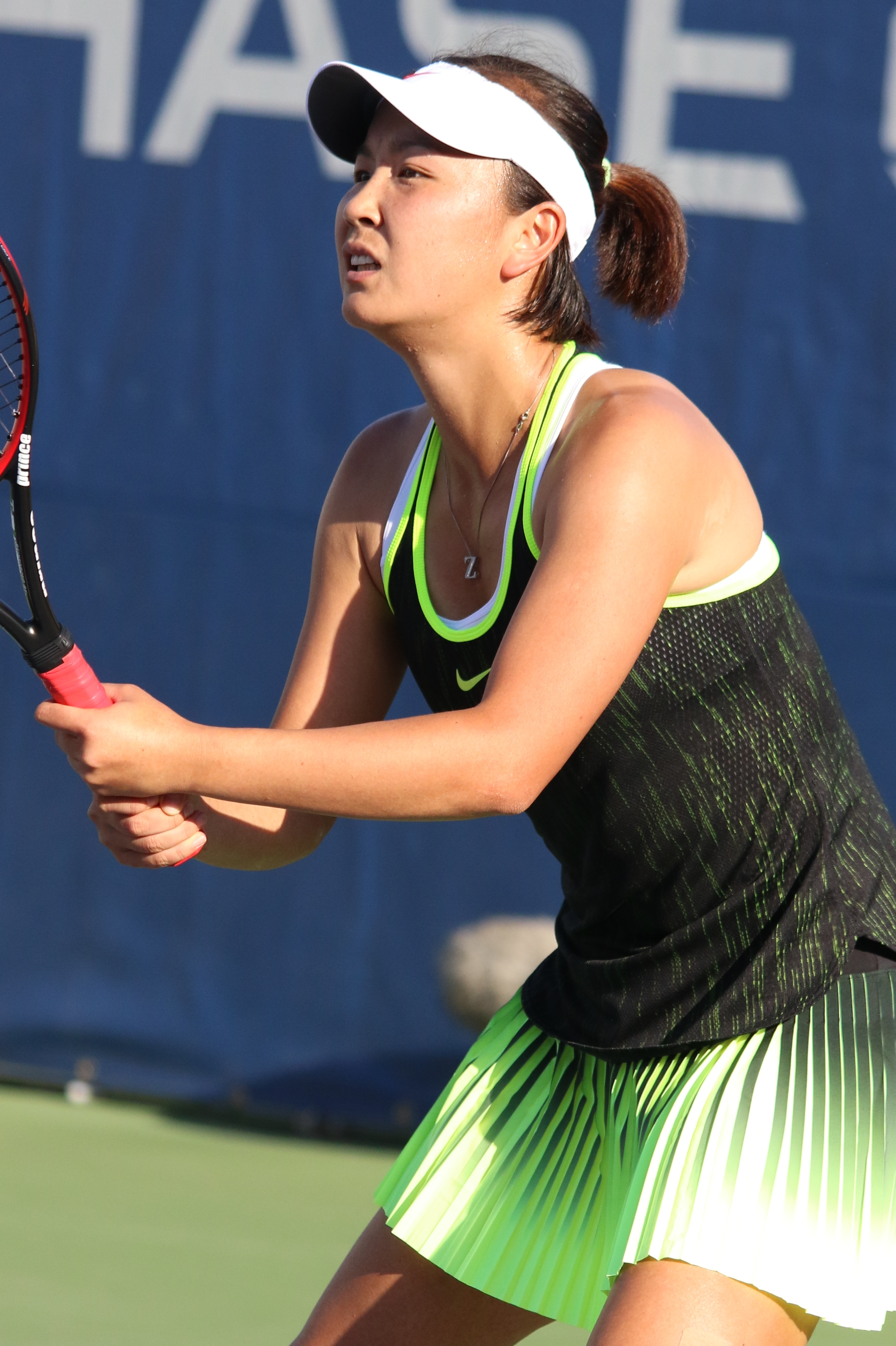
Peng at the 2016 US Open

Peng returned to the tour in 2016 in Indian Wells. She suffered from a number of early exits in several events, including a first-round loss in the Rio Olympics. In the China Open, Peng defeated Venus Williams in the first round but lost to Caroline Garcia in the second round. In the Tianjin Open, she clinched her first ever WTA singles title. As a resident in Tianjin, she received a withdraw from seventh seed and compatriot Zhang Shuai in the beginning round. In the second round, she defeated qualifier Chang Kai-chen. She benefited from the withdraw from Agnieszka Radwańska in the quarterfinal and beat Danka Kovinić in the semifinal, which lasted for two days due to rain delays. Peng had to play the final several hours after the semifinal against the 2014 champion Alison Riske and won in two sets. She also won the doubles final match with Christina McHale.

Peng started the season in the Shenzhen Open, where she lost to the eventual champion, Kateřina Siniaková, in the opening round. In the doubles event, she clinched her 21st title with Andrea Hlaváčková without losing a set. In the singles event of the Australian Open, she lost to Eugenie Bouchard in the second round. In the doubles event, Peng and Hlaváčková reached the final without dropping a set, defeating third seed and Olympic champions Makarova/Vesnina and top-seed Garcia/Mladenovic. In the final, they lost a tight match against the 2015 champions Mattek-Sands/Šafářová in three sets.

Peng then competed in the Taiwan Open, where she reached her eighth career final without losing a set. In the final, she lost to the top seed and world No. 13, Elina Svitolina. She also reached the final in the doubles event with Hlaváčková and lost to Vesnina/Makarova with a match tie-break. She reached the fourth round in Indian Wells but fell in the first round in the Madrid Open against Carla Suárez Navarro.

She won her second tour singles title at the Jiangxi International Open in Nanchan, China defeating Nao Hibino in the final.

=== 2018: TIU sanction ===
In August 2018, Peng was banned for six months and fined $10,000 by the Tennis Integrity Unit (TIU) for coercion and offering possible financial reward so that her main partner would agree to withdraw from the ladies doubles, even after the sign-in deadline at the 2017 Wimbledon Championships. Her partner, Alison Van Uytvanck, refused and Peng withdrew from the tournament instead. Three months of her ban and $5,000 of the fine were suspended. Her former coach Bertrand Perret of France was also banned for three months.

=== 2019–2022: Retirement ===
Peng began her 2019 season at the Shenzhen Open. She retired during the third set of her first-round match against Kristýna Plíšková due to a thigh injury. In doubles, she and compatriot, Yang Zhaoxuan, won the title beating Duan Yingying/Renata Voráčová in the final. Peng was defeated in the first rounds at the Australian Open, Roland Garros, and Wimbledon, and in the second round at the US Open.

At the Jiangxi International, Peng made it to the semifinals where she was defeated by Elena Rybakina. In doubles, she and Zhang Shuai reached the final but lost to compatriots Wang Xinyu/Zhu Lin. Peng lost in the second round at Guangzhou in singles but won the doubles title with Laura Siegemund, defeating Alexa Guarachi/Giuliana Olmos in the final. She was defeated in the first or second rounds in Wuhan, Beijing, and Tianjin but won against Zhu Lin in the final of the Suzhou Ladies Open.

Peng started into 2020 season at the Shenzhen Open, where she lost in the second round to fifth seed and eventual champion, Ekaterina Alexandrova. In Hobart, she and Zhang Shuai reached the doubles final but were defeated by Nadiia Kichenok/Sania Mirza. At the Australian Open, Thailand Open, and Qatar Open, she was defeated in either the first or the second.

In February 2022, Peng announced her retirement during an interview with the French magazine L'Équipe, where she also mentioned her 2021 social media post and subsequent events. In April 2026, she was spotted at a pickleball event in Beijing.

== Sexual assault allegation and disappearance ==
On November 2, 2021, Peng reportedly accused Zhang Gaoli, a retired Vice Premier of the State Council and member of the Standing Committee of the Politburo, of sexually assaulting her in 2018. The revelation came from her Weibo post, which disclosed that the two had gotten together before Zhang rose through the ranks in the Politburo. He retired in 2018, and after inviting Peng to his home with his wife, Zhang wanted to have sex with the tennis star again. Peng refused at first, but Zhang continued to try to persuade her. Scared and panicking, she ultimately agreed due to previous feelings for him. They renewed their semi-private relationship until a dispute on 30 October 2021. Peng's post drew attention to the MeToo movement in China, where activist Zhou Xiaoxuan expressed her sympathies. The post was removed within 20 minutes of being uploaded, and related discussions became widely censored in China.

Peng did not communicate on social media immediately afterwards and was not reachable by the WTA. Chinese officials gave vague responses to inquiries, while the Chinese Tennis Association said she was safe. WTA chief executive Steve Simon called on Chinese authorities to investigate her allegations and stop censoring the subject, and multiple tennis personalities expressed their concerns. Peng re-appeared on November 21 at a tennis tournament, with videos on Chinese state media. Various China watchers and human rights advocates still worried that she might not be free. The International Tennis Federation, Amnesty International, the EU, and the UNHCHR called for proof of her safety, while the WTA decided to suspend all tournaments in China. The IOC said it held two video calls with her. In a later video from Lianhe Zaobao and an interview with the French magazine L'Équipe, Peng said she had not accused anyone of sexual assault, but some skepticism persisted, as well as debates over the meaning and legal implications of her original post.

Peng attended a meeting with IOC officials and several events at the 2022 Winter Olympics. Her revelations and subsequent events remain censored within China. She was included in Time magazine's 100 Most Influential People of 2022, where feminist activist Lü Pin highlighted Peng's Weibo post, disappearance, and impact on the defense of women's rights against authoritarianism.

In August 2022, ITF president David Haggerty said he had spoken to Peng and she appeared to be safe. The WTA demanded that the Chinese government investigate Peng's report, although some tennis officials considered that request to be excessive. In April 2023, the WTA ended its suspension of events in China. It stated that although unsatisfied with the status of Peng's case, it has received reassurances from Chinese athletics bodies of Peng's and other athletes' safety, and continuing the suspension would be unfair to everyone else. New York Times and Guardian writers criticized the decision, which they believe was motivated by money. They also considered WTA's suspension to be more symbolic than substantial, because China was already experiencing lockdowns due to the COVID-19 pandemic.

== Career statistics ==
=== Grand Slam performance timelines ===
Key
W	F	SF	QF	#R	RR	Q#	DNQ	A	NH

(W) winner; (F) finalist; (SF) semifinalist; (QF) quarterfinalist; (#R) rounds 4, 3, 2, 1; (RR) round-robin stage; (Q#) qualification round; (DNQ) did not qualify; (A) absent; (NH) not held; (SR) strike rate (events won / competed); (W–L) win–loss record.
To avoid confusion and double counting, these charts are updated at the conclusion of a tournament or when the player's participation has ended.

==== Singles ====
Tournament	2004	2005	2006	2007	2008	2009	2010	2011	2012	2013	2014	2015	2016	2017	2018	2019	2020	2021	SR	W–L	Win %
Australian Open	A	2R	1R	2R	1R	3R	1R	4R	2R	2R	1R	4R	A	2R	1R	1R	1R	A	0 / 15	13–15	46%
French Open	Q3	2R	2R	A	2R	1R	A	3R	3R	2R	1R	1R	A	1R	2R	Q1	A	A	0 / 11	9–11	45%
Wimbledon	1R	A	3R	1R	3R	2R	A	4R	4R	2R	4R	A	1R	3R	1R	Q1	NH	A	0 / 12	17–12	59%
US Open	Q1	1R	1R	1R	2R	2R	3R	4R	1R	2R	SF	A	1R	2R	A	2R	A	A	0 / 13	15–13	54%
Win–loss	0–1	2–3	3–4	1–3	4–4	4–4	2–2	11–4	6–4	4–4	8–4	3–2	0–2	4–4	1–3	1–2	0–1	0–0	0 / 51	54–51	51%
Career statistics
Titles	0	0	0	0	0	0	0	0	0	0	0	0	1	1	0	0	0	0	Career total: 2		
Finals	0	0	1	0	2	0	0	1	0	1	1	0	1	2	0	0	0	0	Career total: 9		
Year-end ranking	73	37	56	46	40	47	72	17	40	45	21	137	84	27	298	75	117	306	$9,617,653		

==== Doubles ====
Tournament	2004	2005	2006	2007	2008	2009	2010	2011	2012	2013	2014	2015	2016	2017	2018	2019	2020	2021	SR	W–L
Australian Open	A	3R	2R	2R	2R	QF	3R	3R	1R	3R	2R	1R	1R	F	SF	1R	1R	A	0 / 16	24–16
French Open	A	1R	2R	A	3R	SF	A	2R	3R	2R	W	A	A	3R	1R	A	A	A	1 / 10	19–9
Wimbledon	A	A	2R	QF	1R	1R	A	QF	1R	W	3R	A	2R	A	2R	1R	NH	A	1 / 11	17–9
US Open	QF	2R	1R	2R	3R	2R	2R	1R	QF	QF	3R	A	A	SF	A	2R	A	A	0 / 13	22–13
Win–loss	3–1	3–3	3–4	5–3	5–4	8–4	3–2	6–4	5–4	12–3	11–3	0–1	1–2	12–4	4–1	1–4	0–1	0–0	2 / 50	82–47
Year-end championships
WTA Finals	Did not qualify									W	F	Did not qualify							1 / 2	4–1
Career statistics
Titles	0	0	0	1	2	3	0	1	0	5	5	0	3	1	0	2	0	0	Career total: 23	
Finals	0	0	0	2	2	3	2	1	0	5	6	0	3	3	1	3	1	0	Career total: 32	
Year-end ranking	85	61	105	20	27	12	39	25	56	4	3	872	44	9	63	49	58	192		

=== Grand Slam tournament finals ===
==== Doubles: 3 (2 titles, 1 runner-up) ====
Result	Year	Championship	Surface	Partner	Opponents	Score
Win	2013	Wimbledon	Grass	(Chinese Taipei) Hsieh Su-wei	(Australia) Ashleigh Barty (Australia) Casey Dellacqua	7–6^{(7–1)}, 6–1
Win	2014	French Open	Clay	(Chinese Taipei) Hsieh Su-wei	(Italy) Sara Errani (Italy) Roberta Vinci	6–4, 6–1
Loss	2017	Australian Open	Hard	(Czech Republic) Andrea Hlaváčková	(United States) Bethanie Mattek-Sands (Czech Republic) Lucie Šafářová	7–6^{(7–4)}, 3–6, 3–6

=== Year-end championships ===
==== Doubles: 2 (1 title, 1 runner-up) ====
Result	Year	Championship	Surface	Partner	Opponents	Score
Win	2013	WTA Finals, Istanbul	Hard (i)	(Chinese Taipei) Hsieh Su-wei	(Russia) Ekaterina Makarova (Russia) Elena Vesnina	6–4, 7–5
Loss	2014	WTA Finals, Singapore	Hard (i)	(Chinese Taipei) Hsieh Su-wei	(Zimbabwe) Cara Black (India) Sania Mirza	1–6, 0–6

== See also ==
- Tennis in China
- List of solved missing person cases (2020s)
- MeToo movement in China
