= Brussels Open =

Defunct tennis tournament
- Founded: 2011
- Abolished: 2013
- Editions: 3
- Location: Brussels; Belgium
- Venue: Royal Primerose Tennis Club
- Category: Premier
- Surface: Clay / outdoor
- Draw: 30S / 16D
- Prize money: US$ 235,000

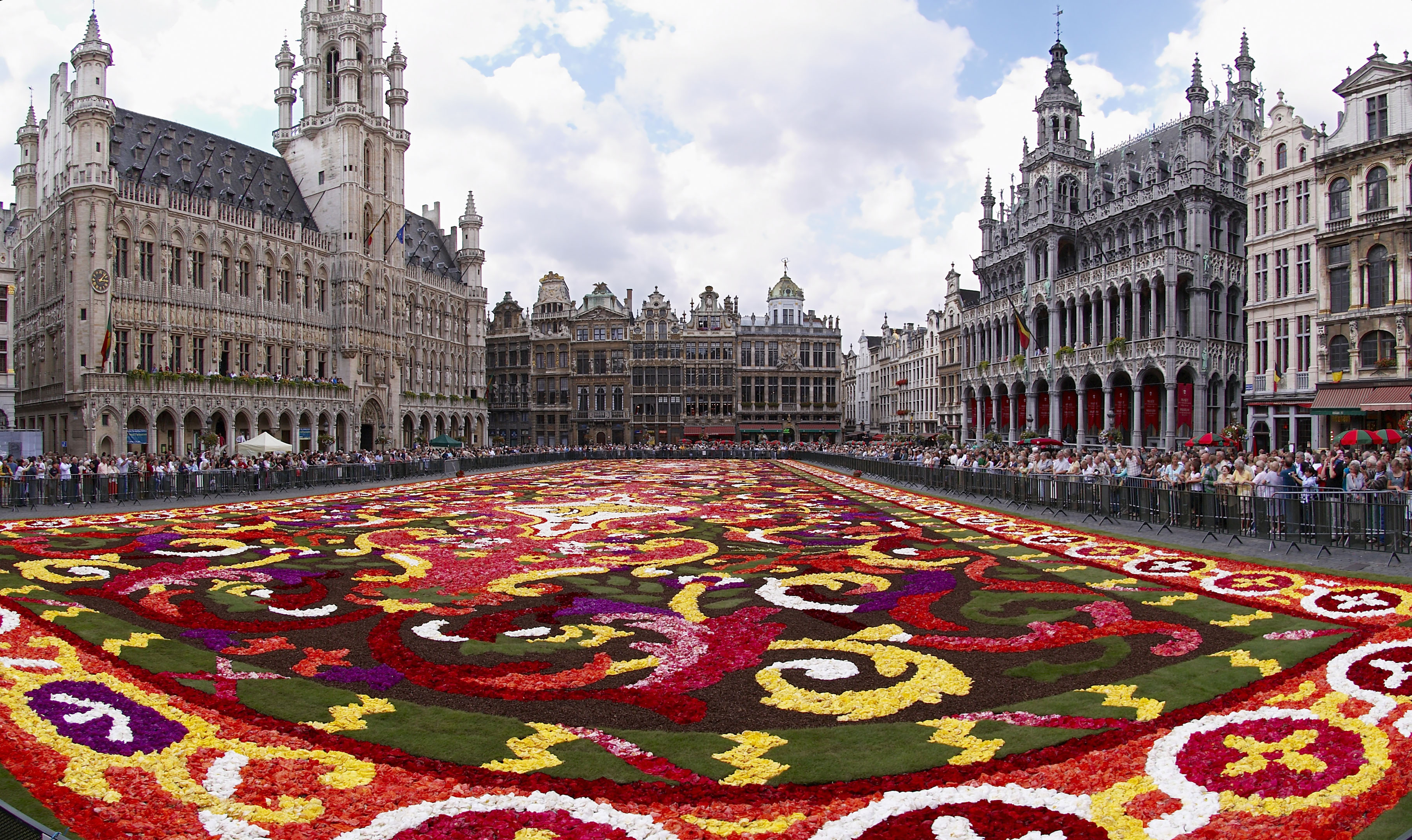
Brussels Open

The Brussels Open, unofficially also known as Open de Bruxelles, was a professional women's tennis tournament on the WTA Tour held at the Royal Primerose Tennis Club in Brussels, Belgium. It was first held in 2011, replacing the Warsaw Open, and last held in 2013. The Brussels Open was played on outdoor clay courts and scheduled in May as a preparation tournament for the French Open. In 2014 the tournament was initially downgraded from Premier to International status, and was subsequently cancelled. It's slot on the WTA Tour calendar was taken up by the Nuremberg Cup.

== Past finals ==
=== Singles ===
| Year | Champions | Runners-up | Score |
|---|---|---|---|
| 2011 | (Denmark) Caroline Wozniacki | (China) Peng Shuai | 2–6, 6–3, 6–3 |
| 2012 | (Poland) Agnieszka Radwańska | (Romania) Simona Halep | 7–5, 6–0 |
| 2013 | (Estonia) Kaia Kanepi | (China) Peng Shuai | 6–2, 7–5 |
| 2014 | replaced by Nuremberg Cup | | |

=== Doubles ===
| Year | Champions | Runners-up | Score |
|---|---|---|---|
| 2011 | (Czech Republic) Andrea Hlaváčková (Kazakhstan) Galina Voskoboeva | (Poland) Klaudia Jans (Poland) Alicja Rosolska | 3–6, 6–0, [10–5] |
| 2012 | (United States) Bethanie Mattek-Sands (India) Sania Mirza | (Poland) Alicja Rosolska (China) Zheng Jie | 6–3, 6–2 |
| 2013 | (Germany) Anna-Lena Grönefeld (Czech Republic) Květa Peschke | (Canada) Gabriela Dabrowski (Israel) Shahar Pe'er | 6–0, 6–3 |
| 2014 | replaced by Nuremberg Cup | | |

== See also ==
- Belgian Open – women's tournament (1987–2002)
- Diamond Games – women's tournament (2002–2008, 2015)
