= 2009 Commonwealth Bank Tournament of Champions – Singles =

Singles
- 2009 Commonwealth Bank Tournament of Champions

Final
- Champion: (France) Aravane Rezaï
- Runner-up: (France) Marion Bartoli
- Score: 7–5, retired

Events
Singles	men	women
Doubles	men	women
← 2008 ·	Commonwealth Bank Tournament of Champions	· 2010 →

Aravane Rezaï won in the final, after Marion Bartoli retired due to a leg injury after losing the first set 7–5.

== Players ==
1. (France) Marion Bartoli (final, retired due to a leg injury)
2. (Australia) Samantha Stosur (round robin)
3. (Belgium) Yanina Wickmayer (round robin, withdrew)
4. (Germany) Sabine Lisicki (WC) (round robin)
5. (Spain) Anabel Medina Garrigues (round robin)
6. (Spain) María José Martínez Sánchez (semifinals)
7. (Israel) Shahar Pe'er (round robin)
8. (Hungary) Melinda Czink (round robin)
9. (Hungary) Ágnes Szávay (round robin)
10. (France) Aravane Rezaï (champion)
11. (Slovakia) Magdaléna Rybáriková (round robin)
12. (Japan) Kimiko Date-Krumm (WC) (semifinals)

== Alternates ==
1. (Russia) Vera Dushevina (replaced Wickmayer) (round robin)

== Draw ==
=== Key ===
- Q = Qualifier
- WC = Wild card
- LL = Lucky loser
- Alt = Alternate
- ITF = ITF entry
- PR = Protected ranking
- SR = Special ranking
- SE = Special exempt
- JE = Junior exempt
- JR = Junior Accelerator Programme entrant
- CO = College Accelerator Programme entrant
- NG = Next Gen Accelerator Program entrant
- w/o = Walkover
- r = Retired
- d = Defaulted

=== Finals ===
Semifinals
1	(France) Marion Bartoli	6	6
12/WC	(Japan) Kimiko Date-Krumm	1	3
10	(France) Aravane Rezaï	6	6
6	(Spain) María José Martínez Sánchez	2	3

Final
1	(France) Marion Bartoli	5	0^{r}
10	(France) Aravane Rezaï	7	0

=== Group A ===
		(France) Bartoli	(Israel) Pe'er	(Slovakia) Rybáriková	RR; W–L	Set; W–L	Game; W–L	Standings
1	(France) Marion Bartoli		6–3, 6–2	6–4, 6–4	2–0	4–0	24–13	1
7	(Israel) Shahar Pe'er	3–6, 2–6		6–1, 7–6^{(7–4)}	1–1	2–2	18–19	2
11	(Slovakia) Magdaléna Rybáriková	4–6, 4–6	1–6, 6–7^{(4–7)}		0–2	0–4	15–25	3

Standings are determined by: 1. number of wins; 2. number of matches; 3. in two-players-ties, head-to-head records; 4. in three-players-ties, percentage of sets won, or of games won; 5. steering-committee decision.

=== Group B ===
		(Australia) Stosur	(Spain) Martínez Sánchez	(Hungary) Szávay	RR; W–L	Set; W–L	Game; W–L	Standings
2	(Australia) Samantha Stosur		6–7^{(4–7)}, 5–7	6–2, 3–6, 6–1	1–1	2–3	26–23	2
6	(Spain) María José Martínez Sánchez	7–6^{(7–4)}, 7–5		2–6, 6–4, 6–0	2–0	4–1	28–21	1
9	(Hungary) Ágnes Szávay	2–6, 6–3, 1–6	6–2, 4–6, 0–6		0–2	2–4	19–31	3

Standings are determined by: 1. number of wins; 2. number of matches; 3. in two-players-ties, head-to-head records; 4. in three-players-ties, percentage of sets won, or of games won; 5. steering-committee decision.

=== Group C ===
		(Belgium) Wickmayer (Russia) Dushevina	(Spain) Medina Garrigues	(Japan) Date-Krumm	RR; W–L	Set; W–L	Game; W–L	Standings
3 Alt	(Belgium) Yanina Wickmayer (Russia) Vera Dushevina		2–6, 6–1, 7–5 (w/ Dushevina)	7–6^{(7–5)}, 6–3 (w/ Wickmayer)	1–0; 1–0	2–0; 2–1	13–9; 15–12	X 2
5	(Spain) Anabel Medina Garrigues	6–2, 1–6, 5–7 (w/ Dushevina)		4–6, 3–6	0–2	1–4	19–27	3
12/WC	(Japan) Kimiko Date-Krumm	6–7^{(5–7)}, 3–6 (w/ Wickmayer)	6–4, 6–3		1–1	2–2	21–20	1

Standings are determined by: 1. number of wins; 2. number of matches; 3. in two-players-ties, head-to-head records; 4. in three-players-ties, percentage of sets won, or of games won; 5. steering-committee decision.

=== Group D ===
		(Germany) Lisicki	(Hungary) Czink	(France) Rezaï	RR; W–L	Set; W–L	Game; W–L	Standings
4/WC	(Germany) Sabine Lisicki		6–2, 6–7^{(1–7)}, 6–4	6–1, 3–6, 4–6	1–1	3–3	31–26	2
8	(Hungary) Melinda Czink	2–6, 7–6^{(7–1)}, 4–6		3–6, 5–7	0–2	1–4	21–31	3
10	(France) Aravane Rezaï	1–6, 6–3, 6–4	6–3, 7–5		2–0	4–1	26–21	1

Standings are determined by: 1. number of wins; 2. number of matches; 3. in two-players-ties, head-to-head records; 4. in three-players-ties, percentage of sets won, or of games won; 5. steering-committee decision.
