= 2009 Commonwealth Bank Tournament of Champions =

- Date: November 4–8
- Edition: 1st
- Category: WTA Tournament of Champions
- Draw: 12S
- Surface: Hard / indoor
- Location: Bali, Indonesia

Champions

Singles
- (France) Aravane Rezaï
WTA Tournament of Champions	· 2010 →

The 2009 Commonwealth Bank Tournament of Champions was a singles-only tennis tournament that was played on indoor hard courts. It was the inaugural edition of the Commonwealth Bank Tournament of Champions and was part of the 2009 WTA Tour. It was held at the Bali International Convention Centre in Bali, Indonesia, from November 4 through November 8, 2009.

== Qualifiers ==
WTA singles rankings (2 November 2009)
Rk	Name	Tournament/s Won
12	(France) Marion Bartoli	Monterrey
13	(Australia) Samantha Stosur	Osaka
18	(Belgium) Yanina Wickmayer	Estoril, Linz
25	(Germany) Sabine Lisicki	Wildcard
28	(Spain) Anabel Medina Garrigues	Fes
30	(Spain) María José Martínez Sánchez	Bogotá, Båstad
31	(Israel) Shahar Pe'er	Guangzhou, Tashkent
39	(Hungary) Melinda Czink	Quebec City
42	(Hungary) Ágnes Szávay	Budapest
44	(France) Aravane Rezaï	Strasbourg
46	(Slovakia) Magdaléna Rybáriková	Birmingham
101	(Japan) Kimiko Date-Krumm	Seoul, Wildcard

The 10 highest-ranked players who have captured at least one International tournament during the year and who are not participating in singles at the year-end Sony Ericsson Championships in Doha will qualify for the event, along with two wildcards.

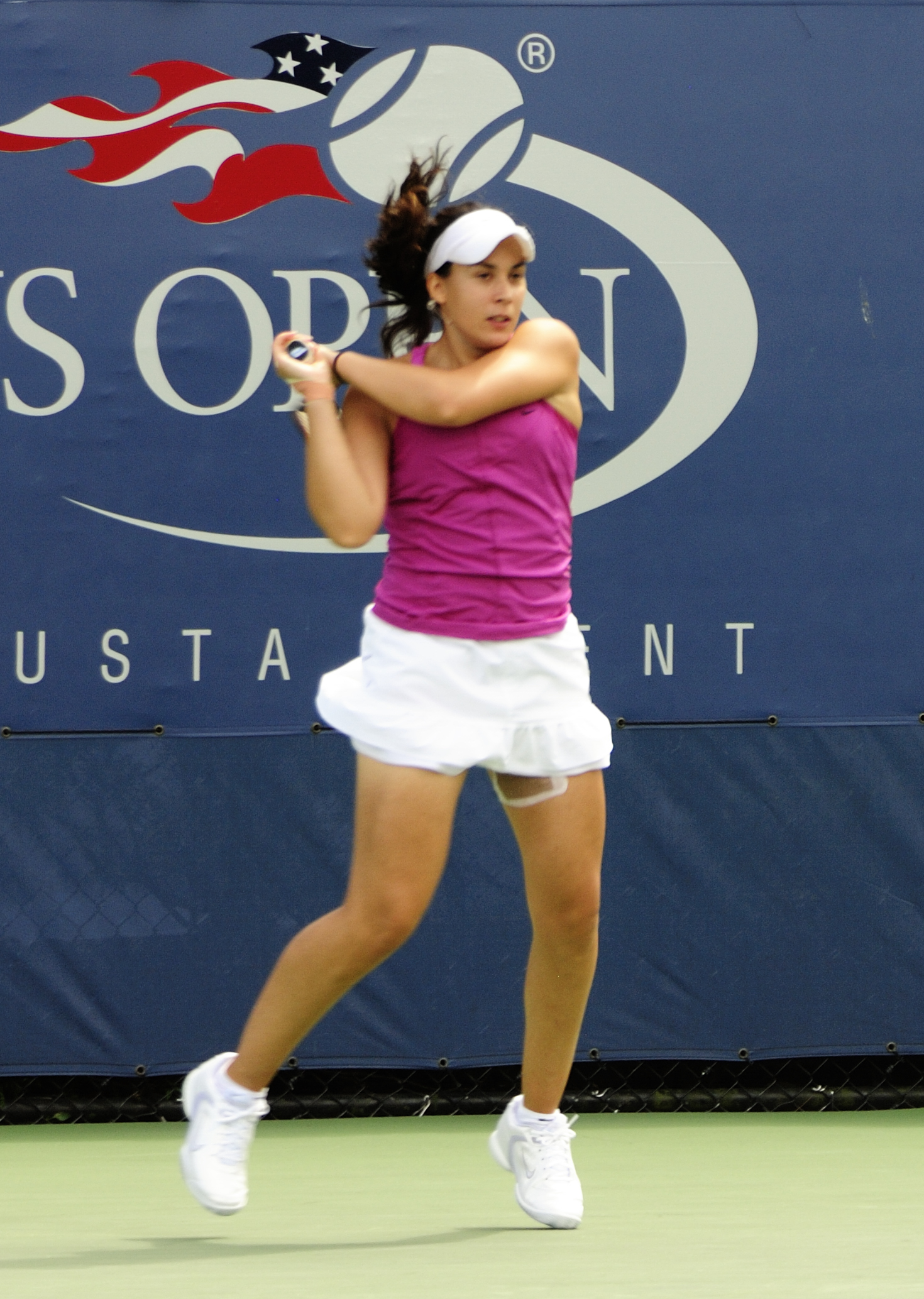
Marion Bartoli won the 2009 Bank of the West Classic by defeating Venus Williams

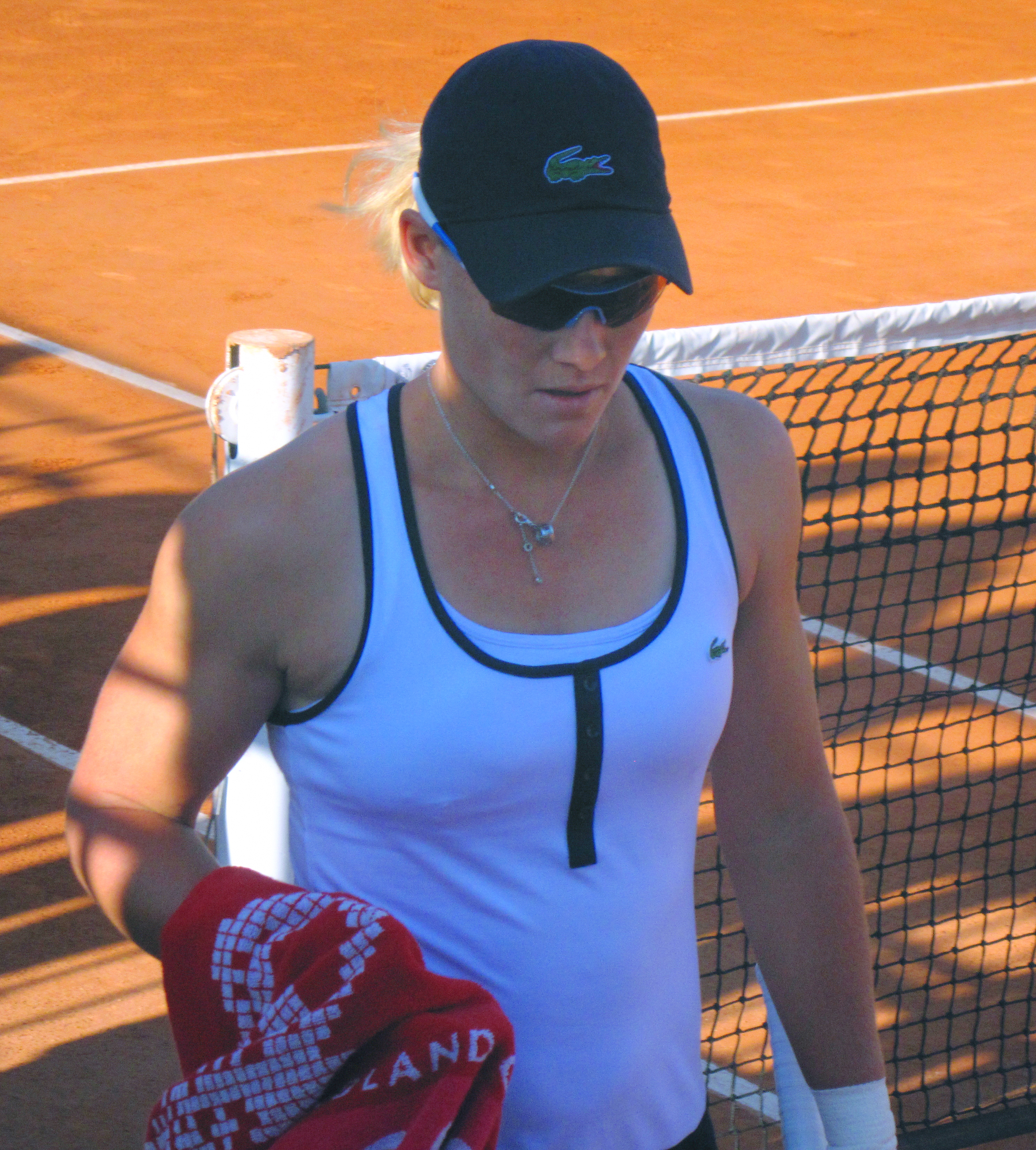
Samantha Stosur reached the Semifinals in 2009 French Open

Marion Bartoli
Completing her fourth straight season as a member of the world's Top 20, France's Bartoli won her fourth and fifth Tour singles titles in 2009 – at the inaugural Monterrey Open defeating Li Na 6–4, 6–3 and at the Bank of the West Classic in Stanford, where she defeated World No. 3 Venus Williams in the final 6–2, 5–7, 6–4. Bartoli also reached the final at the Brisbane International losing to Victoria Azarenka 6–3, 6–1. Her best Grand Slam performance came at the Australian Open, where she advanced to the last eight losing to Vera Zvonareva 6–3, 6–0, and achieved her second win over a reigning World No. 1, when she defeated Jelena Janković in the fourth round.

Samantha Stosur
2009 was a career year for the Australian, she had her breakthrough at the Sony Ericsson Open, where she reached the Quarterfinals defeating then world no. 2 Dinara Safina en route. She then advanced to her first Grand Slam semifinal at Roland Garros losing to eventual champion Svetlana Kuznetsova 6–4, 6–7(5), 6–3 defeating Elena Dementieva 6–3, 4–6, 6–1 en route. She then advanced to her first final of the year LA Women's Tennis Championships falling to Flavia Pennetta 6–4, 6–3. She then won her maiden Tour singles title at the HP Open defeating Caroline Wozniacki 6–0, 4–6, 6–4 in the Semifinals and Francesca Schiavone 7–5, 6–1 in the Final. She also broke into the Top 15, reaching a career-high ranking of No. 13. Stosur also had a strong year in doubles with partner Rennae Stubbs, reaching finals at Wimbledon, the Rogers Cup and the Aegon International (Eastbourne), earning the pair a spot at the Sony Ericsson Championships—Doha 2009 as one of the four best doubles teams in the world.

Yanina Wickmayer
A rising star from Belgium, Wickmayer had a bad start of the WTA season achieving a 1–5 record before claiming her first two titles at the Estoril Open defeating Ekaterina Makarova 7–5, 6–2 in the final and at the Generali Ladies Linz upsetting no. 1 Flavia Pennetta 7–6(5), 6–3 in the semifinal and defeating Petra Kvitová 6–3, 6–4 both International events on the Sony Ericsson WTA Tour calendar. She was also able to reach the finals of the Ordina Open losing to Tamarine Tanasugarn in the final 6–3, 7–5. She also reached her first Grand Slam semifinal at the US Open (losing to Caroline Wozniacki), the Belgian's best effort at a Grand Slam to date. As a result, Wickmayer made her Top 20 debut the week of October 19, 2009, and the second youngest player ranked in the Top 20 (after Wozniacki).

Sabine Lisicki
Germany's Lisicki had a breakthrough season winning her maiden Tour title at the Family Circle Cup defeating three Top 10 players en route to the trophy (Venus Williams, Marion Bartoli and Caroline Wozniacki). After Charleston, Lisicki's ranking surged from No. 63 to No. 43, then a career high. She also reached another final at the BGL Luxembourg Open losing to Swiss Timea Bacsinszky 6–2, 7–5. In addition, Lisicki enjoyed two wins during Germany's triumph over China in Fed Cup and had her best performance at a Grand Slam by reaching the quarterfinals at Wimbledon, defeating Svetlana Kuznetsova and Caroline Wozniacki but falling to top seed Dinara Safina 6–7(5), 6–4, 6–1. Lisicki made her career Top 30 debut on July 6, 2009.

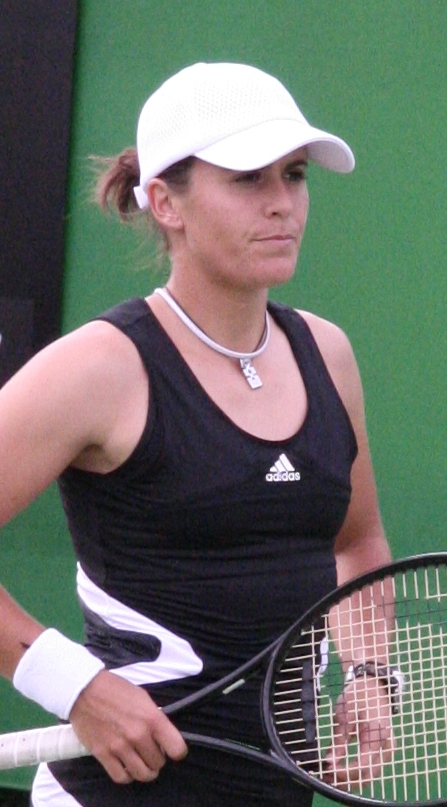
Anabel Medina Garrigues wins at least a title every year since 2004

Anabel Medina Garrigues
For the sixth successive year, Medina Garrigues captured a Tour title, winning the Grand Prix SAR La Princesse Lalla Meryem dominating Ekaterina Makarova 6–0, 6–1. Following the win in Fes, the 27–year-old Spaniard reached a career-best ranking of No. 16 and is set for her third Top 30 finish in the last four years. Additionally, Medina Garrigues was a finalist at the Hansol Korea Open losing to comeback player Kimiko Date-Krumm 6–3 6–3, and matched her best Grand Slam performance by reaching the fourth round of the Australian Open. She also won her second career Grand Slam doubles title (and 13th Sony Ericsson WTA Tour doubles title overall), successfully defending her Roland Garros trophy with partner Virginia Ruano Pascual.

María José Martínez Sánchez
Since turning professional in 1996, Spain's Martínez Sánchez is having the most successful season of her career, winning two International events this season – the Copa Sony Ericsson Colsanitas defeating Gisela Dulko 6–3, 6–2 in the final and the Swedish Open upsetting Caroline Wozniacki 7–5, 6–4 in the final. In 2009 she enjoyed three wins against Top 10 ranked opponents, defeating then No. 10 Nadia Petrova (Rome), in addition to two victories over Caroline Wozniacki (ranked No. 9 at Båstad and No. 5 at Beijing), and reached a career-high singles ranking of No. 31 on October 26, 2009. She was also involved in a controversial match against Serena Williams at the third round of the Roland Garros losing 4–6, 6–3, 6–4, when she was accused of cheating. Together with countrywoman Nuria Llagostera Vives, Martínez Sánchez won six doubles titles in 2009, more than any other team on tour, and the pair also won the Sony Ericsson Championships.

Shahar Pe'er
In September, Pe'er won back-to-back International events – the Guangzhou International Women's Open defeating Alberta Brianti 6–3, 6–4 and the Tashkent Open defeating Akgul Amanmuradova 6–3, 6–4 – her 4th and 5th Tour singles titles. As her first three career titles came in 2006, the win in Guangzhou broke a three-year title drought. Pe'er was also a three-time semifinalist this year – at Pattaya Women's Open, and Estoril Open and BGL Luxembourg Open. Representing Israel in Fed Cup in an away tie against Ukraine, Pe'er won both her singles matches against Alona Bondarenko and Kateryna Bondarenko, each in three sets, although Israel lost the tie 3–2. Pe'er also teamed with Gisela Dulko to reach the doubles final at the BNP Paribas Open in March. She was also involved in a controversy in Dubai when she was denied a visa, which led to a penalty to the tournament and the withdrawal of then-defending Men's champion Andy Roddick.

Melinda Czink
Hungary's Czink won the first Tour singles title of her career at the Bell Challenge defeating Lucie Šafářová 4–6, 6–3, 7–5 in the final in September, dropping only one set all week. As the result, she made her Top 40 ranking debut, rising from No. 52 to No. 37, having started the year ranked outside the Top 100. She also reached the last four at the Grand Prix de SAR La Princesse Lalla Meryem, but was forced to retire against eventual champion Medina Garrigues, and was a four-time quarterfinalist this season. Czink achieved her career-first Top 10 win this season, defeating world No. 10 Nadia Petrova at the Family Circle Cup.

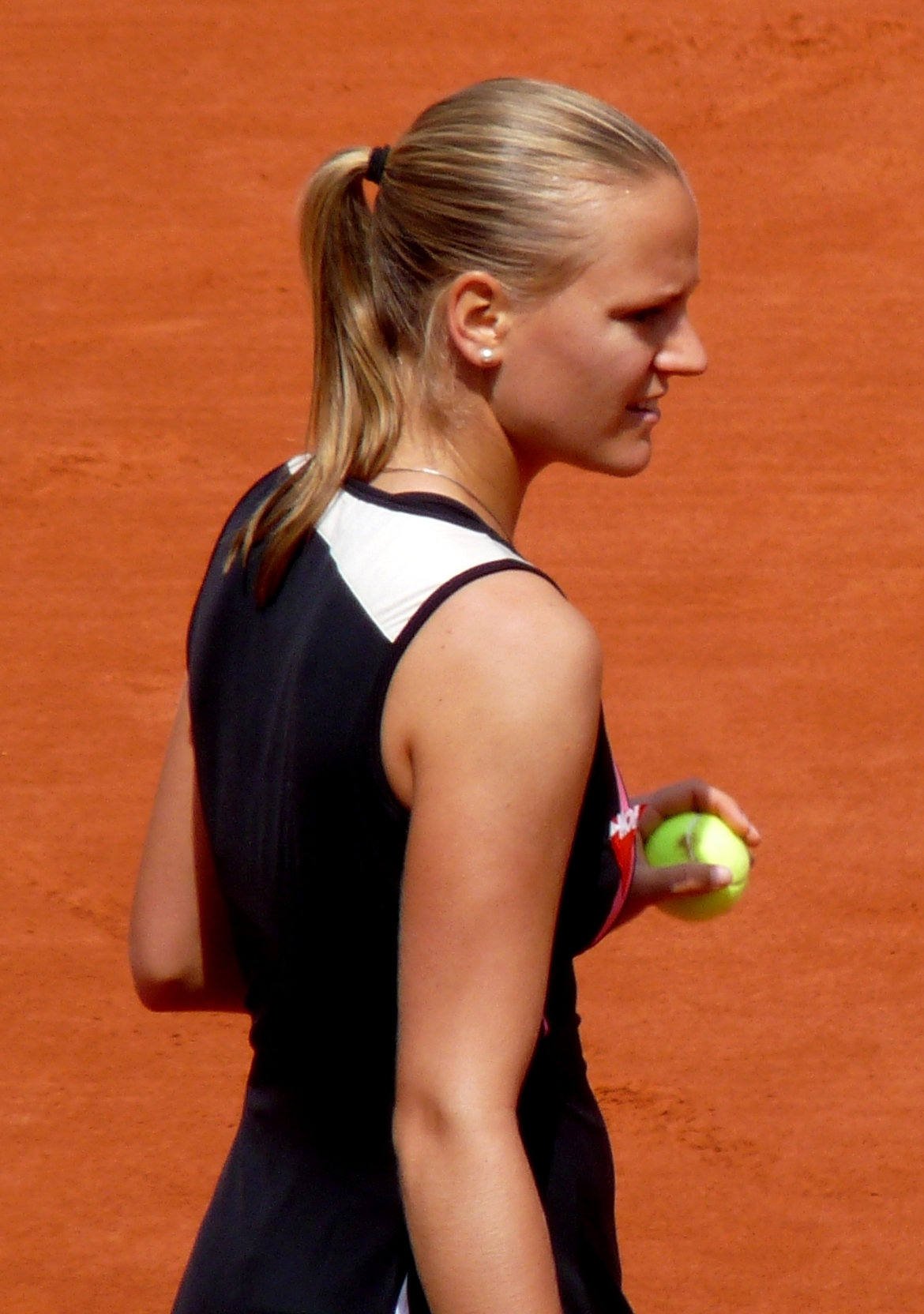
Ágnes Szávay defeated 3 top 10 players this year

Ágnes Szávay
Szávay had a bad run at the beginning of the year losing her first four matches. She however produced her best results of 2009 on clay and collected her third career title at the GDF Suez Grand Prix defeating Patty Schnyder 2–6, 6–4, 6–2 in the final in her native Hungary in July, becoming the first Hungarian to win the title. her luck turned things around after she decided to play qualifying at the Abierto Mexicano Telcel. She won two qualifying matches, then as a lucky loser advanced to the quarterfinals losing to eventual champion Venus Williams 6–2, 5–7, 6–1. After that, Szávay went on to reach the quarterfinals of the Mutua Madrileña Madrid Open and the round of 16 at Roland Garros. She scored three wins against Top 10 players this year – Venus Williams, Victoria Azarenka and Ana Ivanovic – bringing her career total to seven.

Aravane Rezaï
Twenty-two-year-old Rezaï began the year with a Semifinal appearance at the ASB Classic losing to eventual champion Elena Dementieva 6–2, 6–2. She then broke through for her first Tour singles title at the Internationaux de Strasbourg defeating Lucie Hradecká 7–6(2), 6–1 in the final in May, and carried her strong form into the following week at Roland Garros, advancing to the fourth round losing to Dinara Safina 6–1, 6–0 and equaling her best result at a Grand Slam. The French player achieved her career-best win at the Rogers Cup in August when she eclipsed the world No. 1 Dinara Safina in three sets. During the 2009 season, Rezaï's singles ranking rose to a career-high world No. 36.

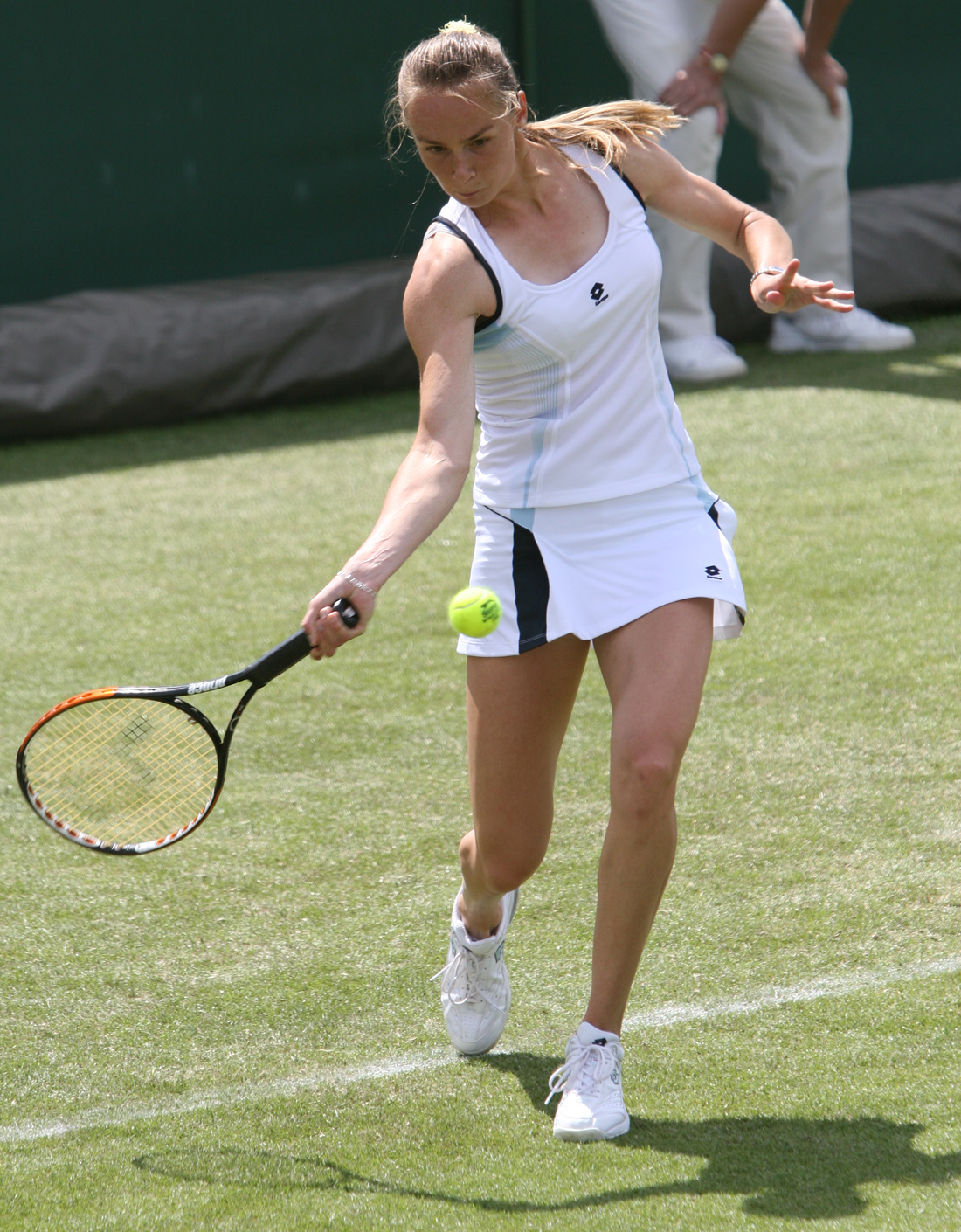
Magdaléna Rybáriková won the 2009 Aegon Classic (Photo © Rowland Charles Goodman)

Magdaléna Rybáriková
Slovakian Rybáriková collected her first career Tour title in 2009, winning on grass at the Aegon Classic defeating Li Na 6–0, 7–6(2), and reached two semifinals earlier in the season – at the Moorilla Hobart International and the Pattaya Women's Open. Additionally, she was a quarterfinalist at the Gastein Ladies and the Pilot Pen Tennis, and equaled her career-best Grand Slam showing at the US Open by reaching the third round losing to Venus Williams 6–2, 7–5. She broke into the Top 40 for the first time during the week of June 22, 2009. Prior to 2009, she reached the quarterfinals of a tournament only once, at the 2008 Tashkent Open. Rybáriková also recorded six wins over Top 20 ranked players this season.

Kimiko Date-Krumm
Since turning pro in 1989, Date-Krumm won eight Tour singles titles and one doubles title. After playing in her second Olympics, Date-Krumm announced her retirement on September 24, 1996, yet came back to the Tour nearly 12 years later, announcing an unexpected comeback in April 2008. After the return, Date-Krumm has won several ITF titles prior to capturing a trophy at the Hansol Korea Open upsetting top-seed Daniela Hantuchová 7–6(3), 4–6, 6–4 in the Quarterfinals before defeating Anabel Medina Garrigues 6–3, 6–3 in the finals, thus becoming the second-oldest player in the Open Era, after Billie Jean King, to win a singles title on the WTA Tour.

Vera Dushevina
Dushevina will also come to Bali to serve as an alternate. Dushevina won her maiden title at the İstanbul Cup dominating Lucie Hradecká 6–1, 6–0. She was also able to reach 5 quarterfinals in the entire year, in Pattaya Women's Open, Mutua Madrileña Madrid Open, Aegon International, Hansol Korea Open, Kremlin Cup. She claimed one top 10 win this year over Nadia Petrova at the Aegon International.

== Groupings ==
The draw was made for the Commonwealth Bank Tournament of Champions, with round-robin matches taking place from Wednesday 4th until Friday 6 November. The 12 players are split into four groups of three, with one each of the top four seeds placed into Group A, B, C and D in order of ranking. The next four players based on ranking were then drawn and placed in each group, followed by the final four.

Group A featured 2007 Wimbledon Finalist Marion Bartoli, Israeli Shahar Pe'er and rising star Magdaléna Rybáriková. As their head-to-heads are broken down Pe'er has the bets overall record she is 6–1 against her group, with all win and loss coming against Bartoli, with their last meeting coming at this year at the second round of Indian Wells with Pe'er coming on top 1–6, 6–4, 7–5, Bartoli's only win was in the 3rd round of 2007 Wimbledon where she won 6–3 6–2 and eventually reach the finals. The next match-up was Bartoli and Rybáriková, where Bartoli led 2–1, with all meeting came in 2009; their last meeting was 2009's first round China Open with Bartoli winning 6–2, 4–6, 6–3, Rybáriková's win came at the year's second round New Haven winning 1–6, 7–6(5), 2–0 ret. This tournament featured the first meeting between Rybáriková and Pe'er.

Group B featured Hungarian Ágnes Szávay and top doubles players Samantha Stosur and María José Martínez Sánchez. Between the three of them there has been only one encounter, dating back to 2007 at the first round of New Haven between Szávay and Stosur where Szávay won 6–2, 6–4. This will be Martínez Sánchez' first meeting against her group.

Group C feature a mix of players as a hot rising star in Yanina Wickmayer, top doubles player Anabel Medina Garrigues and Returning Japanese Players Kimiko Date-Krumm. Wickmayer and Medina Garrigues, met only once in this year's Internationaux de Strasbourg with Medina Garrigues winning 1–6, 6–3, 6–3. On the other hand, Date-Krumm and Medina Garrigues has met twice both this year With their first meeting coming to Medina Garrigues at the first round of Guangzhou International Women's Open 6–1, 4–6, 6–4. Their last meeting was in the final of Hansol Korea Open with Date-Krumm winning 6–3, 6–3. This will feature the first meeting between Date-Krumm and Wickmayer.

The last group, Group D features French Aravane Rezaï, Hungarian Melinda Czink and Wildcard recipient Sabine Lisicki. Czink and Lisicki has met twice both in 2008 and has split it 1–1 at the qualifying round of the Australian Open with Lisicki prevailing 6–7(4), 6–0, 6–2 and at the 1st round of the Bell Challenge with Czink prevailing 6–2, 5–7, 6–3. The meetings between Rezaï and Czink also came in 2008 and both in qualifying rounds. The first at the Toray Pan Pacific Open with Rezaï winning 6–4, 6–2 and at the China Open with Czink prevailing 6–2, 1–0 ret. Lisicki and Rezaï has only met once at this year US Open first round with Lisicki winning 7–6(4), 6–7(4), 6–1.

== Head-to-head ==
	Bartoli	Stosur	Wickmayer	Lisicki	Medina Garrigues	Martínez Sánchez	Pe'er	Czink	Szávay	Rezaï	Rybáriková	Date-Krumm	Overall	YTD W-L
(France) Marion Bartoli		1–1	0–0	1–1	4–0	1–1	1–6	2–0	1–1	2–0	2–1	0–0	15–11	46–21
(Australia) Samantha Stosur	1–1		1–1	4–0	1–1	0–0	3–2	1–0	1–0	0–0	1–0	0–0	13–5	37–19
(Belgium) Yanina Wickmayer	0–0	1–1		0–0	1–0	0–2	1–0	0–0	0–1	0–0	2–1	0–0	5–5	54–22
(Germany) Sabine Lisicki	1–1	0–4	0–0		0–0	1–1	2–1	1–1	0–1	1–0	0–0	1–0	7–9	30–17
(Spain) Anabel Medina Garrigues	0–4	1–1	0–1	0–0		2–0	1–0	2–1	1–2	1–0	1–0	1–1	11–10	33–26
(Spain) María José Martínez Sánchez	1–1	0–0	2–0	1–1	0–2		0–0	1–0	0–0	0–0	0–1	0–0	5–5	31–21
(Israel) Shahar Pe'er	6–1	2–3	0–1	1–2	0–1	0–0		3–0	2–0	1–0	0–0	0–0	15–8	40–22
(Hungary) Melinda Czink	0–2	0–1	0–0	1–1	1–2	0–1	0–3		0–1	1–1	0–1	0–0	3–13	38–21
(Hungary) Ágnes Szávay	1–1	0–1	1–0	1–0	2–1	0–0	0–2	0–0		1–1	0–0	0–0	6–6	24–21
(France) Aravane Rezaï	0–2	0–0	0–0	0–1	0–1	0–0	0–1	1–1	1–1		0–0	0–0	2–7	39–23
(Slovakia) Magdaléna Rybáriková	1–2	0–1	1–2	1–1	0–0	1–0	0–0	1–0	0–0	1–0		1–0	7–6	32–24
(Japan) Kimiko Date-Krumm	0–0	0–0	0–0	0–1	1–1	0–0	0–0	0–0	0–0	0–0	0–1		1–3	27–16

== Prize money and points ==
The total prize money for the 2009 Commonwealth Bank Tournament of Champions is 600,000 United States dollars.

Stage	Prize money	Points
Champion	+$100,000	+180
Semifinal win	+$50,000	+170
Round robin (2 wins)	$50,000	250^{1}
Round robin (1 win)	$32,500	160^{1}
Round robin (0 wins)	$15,000	70

^{1} A player get 70 points for competing and 90 for each RR win

== Round robin ==
=== Day 1 ===
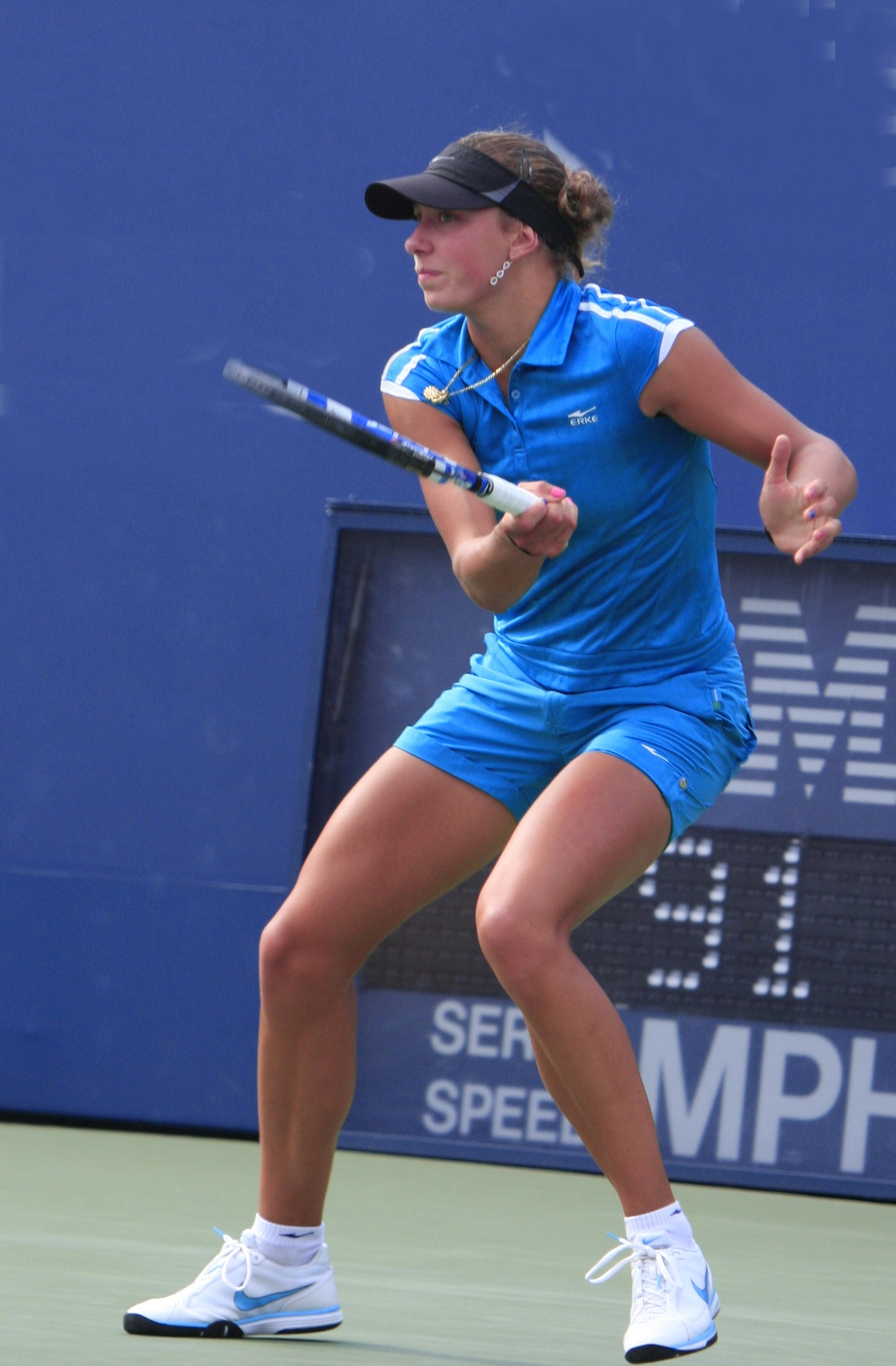
Yanina Wickmayer wins over Kimiko Date-Krumm

The first day of the 2009 Commonwealth Bank Tournament of Champions, started with Group D, with German Sabine Lisicki taking on Aravane Rezaï. The first set was a complete domination by the German, breaking in the second and sixth games to win the first set. The German also only lost 3 points on serve and did not face a single break point. In the second set Rezaï called for her coach and after that came back with more confidence, and started playing more aggressively in the second set. Her forehand winners and unforced errors from Lisicki helped Rezaï jump out to a 3–0 lead and hold on serve to level the match. A moment of controversy turned the third set. The players traded breaks in the first four games before Rezaï broke again and held to lead 4–3. Lisicki looked distressed late in the set when she insisted a Rezaï shot down the line was out. Hawk-Eye showed otherwise, and Rezaï took a 5–3 lead and won the match 6–4 in the third. Rezaï saved 7 of 8 break points on the deciding set. The German did not hide her unhappiness after the match. Rezaï commented after the match that she found it strange that there was no doubles line.

The next match on court was between Japan's Kimiko Date-Krumm and a player 2 decades younger than her, Yanina Wickmayer. In the first set saw Date-Krumm breaking the serve of Belgian player, just give the break right back twice, that pushed it to a tie-break, which the Belgian won 7–5. The second set saw the veteran player run of to a 3–0 lead and in the fourth game had 4 break points just to have them all saved by Wickmayer. After the fourth game Wickmayer, Date-Krumm's unforced errors started filling up as Wickmayer rallied to 5 game streak to win the match 7–6(5), 6–3.

The 3rd match saw top seed Marion Bartoli and Magdaléna Rybáriková aiming to gain an early lead in their group. The match was well contested by the two ladies. The first set saw Bartoli break early and never looked back, even though being herself Bartoli broke right back to take the set 6–4. the second saw the same feature some good tennis, in the first game of the second set saw Bartoli take a 0–40 just to have Rybáriková save all three and hold the game. The important break came to the Frenchwoman at the ninth game when she broke the Rybáriková serve and served the match out 6–4, 6–4 in 98 minutes.

The last match of the day saw a fast-rising Australian second seed Samantha Stosur and Ágnes Szávay. The second seed make a good start, while Szávay obviously had a nervous beginning as Stosur won the first set 6–2 and did not face a single break point on her serve. The second set was more of a contest as Stosur struggled on her serve and saw Szávay taking full advantage and take the set 6–3. In the deciding set however, Stosur improved her serve as she served 6 of her 10 aces and did not face a single break point, and breaking Szávay twice, with a little help from the Hungarian as she serve half of her 12 double faults in the set Stosur took the set 6–1 and the match. The last three matches all took 98 minutes on court.

Matches on Center Court
Group	Winner	Loser	Score
Group D	(France) Aravane Rezaï [10]	(Germany) Sabine Lisicki [4]	1–6 6–3 6–4
Group C	(Belgium) Yanina Wickmayer [3]	(Japan) Kimiko Date-Krumm [12]	7–6(5) 6–3
Group A ^{1}	(France) Marion Bartoli [1]	(Slovakia) Magdaléna Rybáriková [11]	6–4, 6–4
Group B	(Australia) Samantha Stosur [2]	(Hungary) Ágnes Szávay [9]	6–2, 3–6, 6–1
1st Match Starts at 2:00 PM^{1}Not Before 6:30PM

=== Day 2 ===
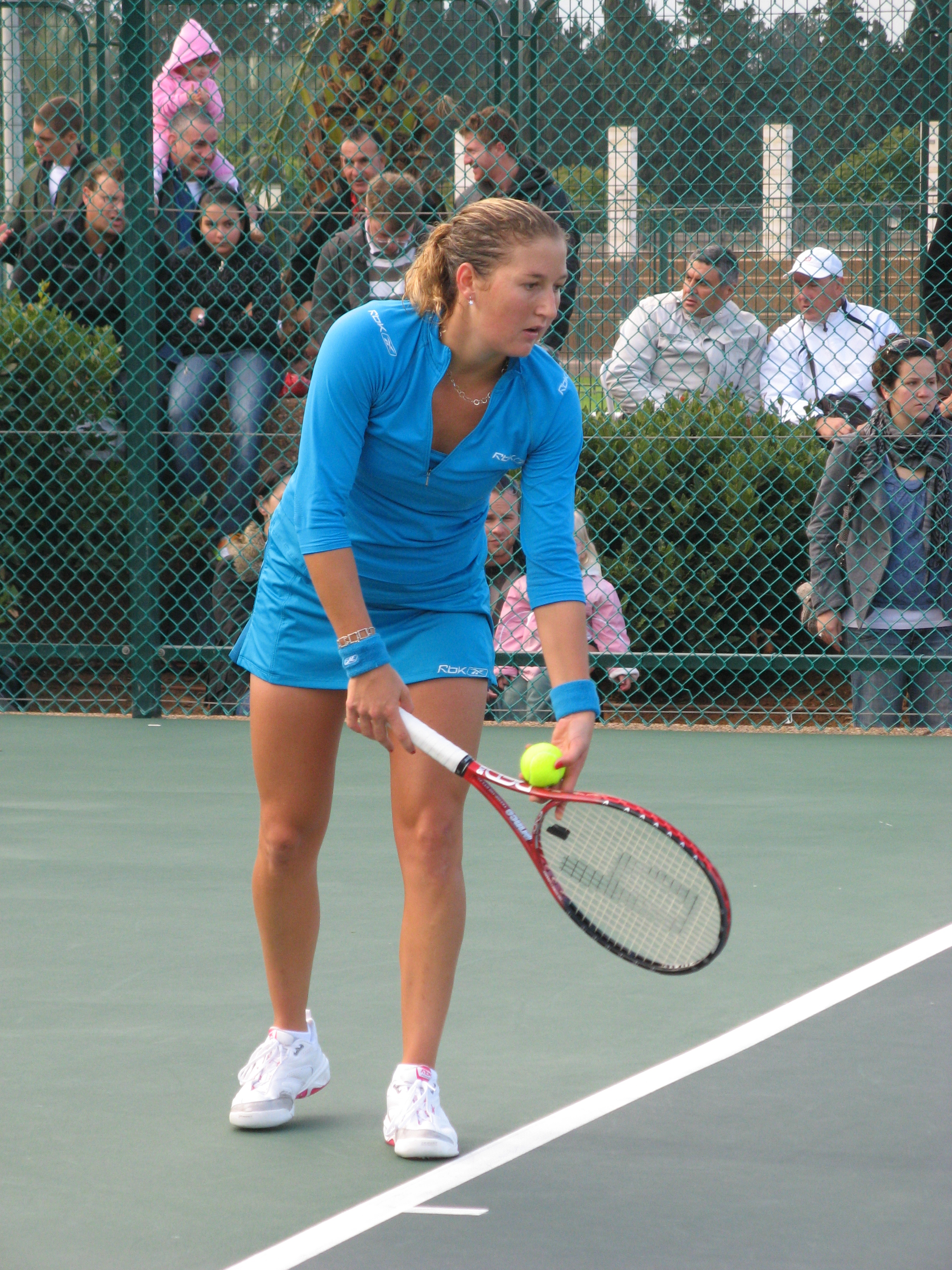
Shahar Pe'er get first win over Rybáriková

The first match of the day began with the group A as Magdaléna Rybáriková looking on winning her first match in the tournament and Shahar Pe'er playin her first match. Pe'er comfortably won the first 6–1 by serving 74% of first serve and converting her 2 break points in the set. The second looked the same as the first in the beginning, leading Rybáriková 4–1 with two breaks of serve, however Rybáriková change her style of play as she became more aggressive to win the next 4 games to lead 5–4, but it was too late as Pe'er stopped her run to hold for 5–5, and then edged the tiebreak 7–4. Shahar Pe'er match with Marion Bartoli will declare the group's representative in the Semifinals.

The match was followed by Frenchwoman Aravane Rezaï and Melinda Czink of group D. Czink made a good start and led the first set 2–0, however Rezaï returned the favor by taking the next two games, they then both held serve at 3–3. However at the 7th game, in Czink' serve she scored a double faults on break point that eventually led to Rezaï claiming a 4–3 lead, and that was proven enough as she hold serve and broke again to win the set 6–3. The second set looked like it was going to a decider as Rezaï piled up the double faults and Czink improves her serve to take a 5–1 and a set point, however her error on the forehand saw that set point lost. from then on as fast as she took the 5–1 lead in vanished even faster as Rezaï won the next 6 games and the set 7–5 and the match. Rezaï will now be the first to advance to the semifinals with two wins.

The match between María José Martínez Sánchez and Ágnes Szávay followed. Szávay took the first set comfortably 6–4. However, in the second as the same as her match with Stosur, she cost herself the match as she committed 7 double faults to give the set to Martínez Sánchez 6–4. The deciding set was a one way affair as Martínez Sánchez blasted Szávay of the court winning the last set 6–0. This win meant that Martínez Sánchez match with Samantha Stosur will declare the group's representative in the Semifinals.

The last match saw Kimiko Date-Krumm taking on Anabel Medina Garrigues. In the first set Krumm broke Garrigues serve early but failed to keep the advantage; however in the 9th game Date-Krumm broke the Medina Garrigues serve and eventually won the set 6–4. The second set then saw the two players trade breaks in the first four games, and then hold their respective serves for a 3–3. As Date-Krumm became more aggressive she broke the Medina Garrigues serve to lead 4–3 then broke again to win the set and match 6–3.

Matches on Center Court
Group	Winner	Loser	Score
Group A	(Israel) Shahar Pe'er [7]	(Slovakia) Magdaléna Rybáriková [11]	6–1 7–6(4)
Group D	(France) Aravane Rezaï [10]	(Hungary) Melinda Czink [8]	6–3 7–5
Group B ^{1}	(Spain) María José Martínez Sánchez [6]	(Hungary) Ágnes Szávay [9]	2–6 6–4 6–0
Group C	(Japan) Kimiko Date-Krumm [12]	(Spain) Anabel Medina Garrigues [5]	6–4 6–3
1st Match Starts at 2:00PM^{1} Not Before 6:30PM

=== Day 3 ===
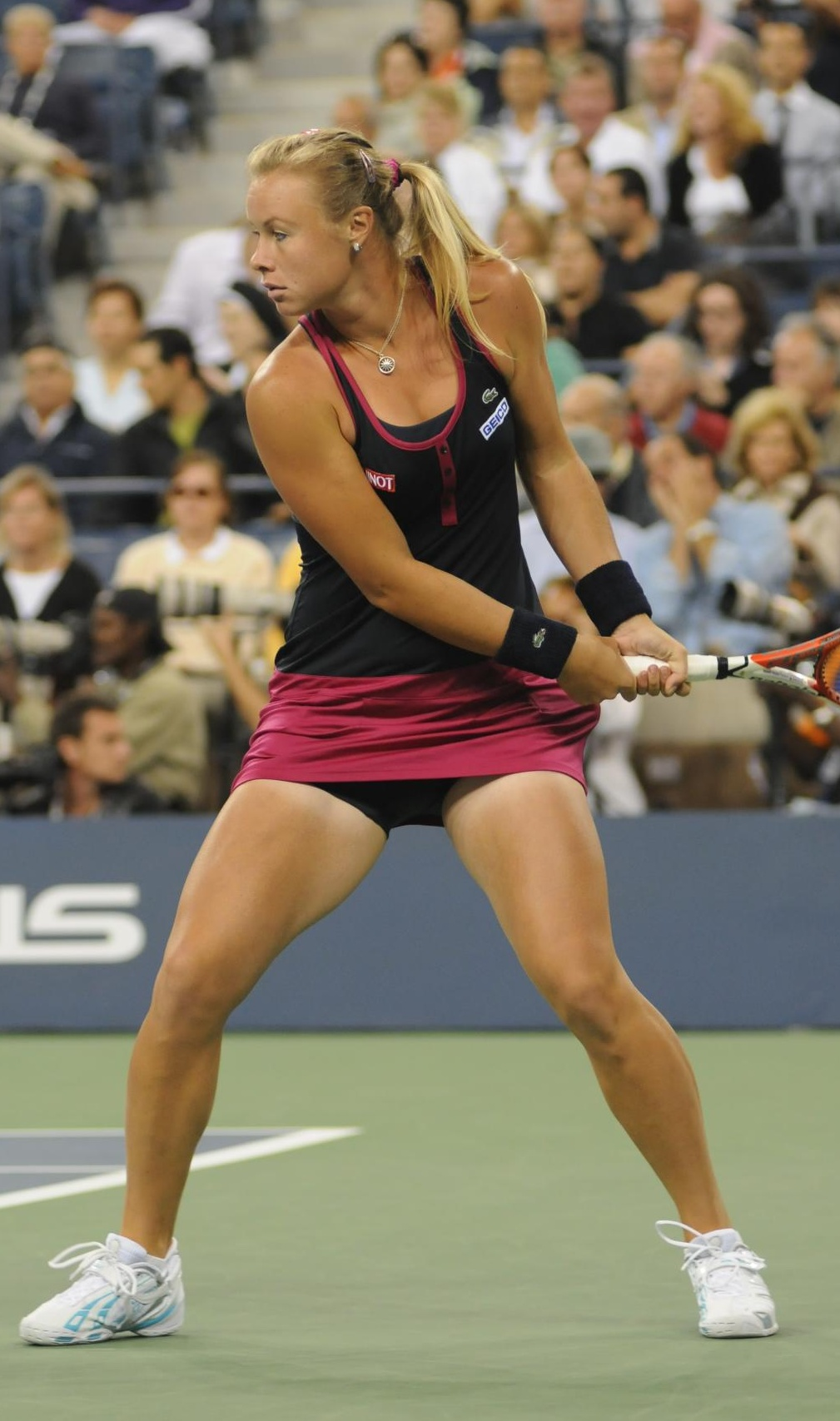
Vera Dushevina victorious over Medina Garrigues

The first match was between two doubles players Samantha Stosur and María José Martínez Sánchez who was competing for a semifinal berth. Martínez Sánchez had quite a battle as she struggled to beat Samantha Stosur 7–6, (7–4), 7–5 to win Group B. The first set went with serve, although Stosur had to save two break points at 2–2 and another at 3–3. In the second set, Stosur broke for 1–0 but dropped her own serve in the next game. Martínez Sánchez then broke again to lead 4–2, held for 5–2, and then held two match points. But Stosur wasn't going down without a fight. She hit a couple of forehand winners to escape that crisis, and then pulled the set back to 5–5 to leave her opponent worried about going to a third set. That didn't happen though, as Martínez Sánchez broke again for the match with a smash. Stosur served a 208 km/h, which is the fastest serve on the women's game, but is still to be reviewed. The second set also saw Stosur serve 5 double faults in 2nd set, which was costly for the Australian.

The second match featured Sabine Lisicki and Melinda Czink who was fighting only for points as Rezaï has already advance in their Group. The first set looked good for the 4th seed German as she won the set 6–2 serving 3 aces, However, in the second set even though serving 4 aces, she also served 4 doubles and only serve 44% of 1st serve, she eventually lost the set at a tie-break 7–1. The third set saw Lisicki came back and dominate as she serve an impressive 8 aces in the set alone and convert 2 of 7 break opportunities to win the set 6–4 and then the match.

The third match saw Marion Bartoli trying to advance with a second victory over Shahar Pe'er in 8 meeting. The first set Marion Bartoli cruising through the first set breaking the Pe'er serve twice in the first set and did not face a single break point. The second set saw the same feature as Bartoli raced through a 3–0 lead breaking Pe'er in the second game, from then on the two players held there serve for four consecutive games up until the last game, where Bartoli broke for the match at 0–40. This win is only Bartoli's second win against the Israeli player.

The last match, which featured Wickmayer's replacement Vera Dushevina and Anabel Medina Garrigues, also didn't have an effect in the semifinals as Date-Krumm advanced to the semifinals by virtue of Wickmayer's withdrawal and her win over Medina Garrigues. At first it looked like Medina Garrigues was going to run away with the match as she broke the Dushevina serve in the first game and then held off two break points to secure a 2–0 lead. Then in the 5th game Medina Garrigues broke at her second chance to lead 4–1. Medina Garrigues then served out the set after cancelling another 3 break points to win the set 6–2. However the second set was a total reversal as Dushevina broke the Medina Garrigues serve twice at the 4th and 6th game, and improved her 1st serve percentage in virtue did not face a single break point to win the set 6–1. The deciding set was a lot more competitive than the other two as they both held serve at the first 6 games up until the 7th game, when Dushevina broke to lead 4–3. When it was 5–4, Dushevina was serving for the match but got broken by Medina Garrigues. But it didn't rattle Dushevina as she won the next two games to win the match at her 2nd match point.

Matches on Center Court
Group	Winner	Loser	Score
Group B	(Spain) María José Martínez Sánchez [6]	(Australia) Samantha Stosur [2]	7–6(4), 7–5
Group D	(Germany) Sabine Lisicki [4]	(Hungary) Melinda Czink [8]	6–2, 6–7(1), 6–4
Group A ^{1}	(France) Marion Bartoli [1]	(Israel) Shahar Pe'er [7]	6–3, 6–2
Group C	(Russia) Vera Dushevina [ALT]	(Spain) Anabel Medina Garrigues [5]	2–6, 6–1, 7–5
1st Match Starts at 2:00PM^{1}Not Before 6:30PM

== Finals ==
=== Day 4 ===
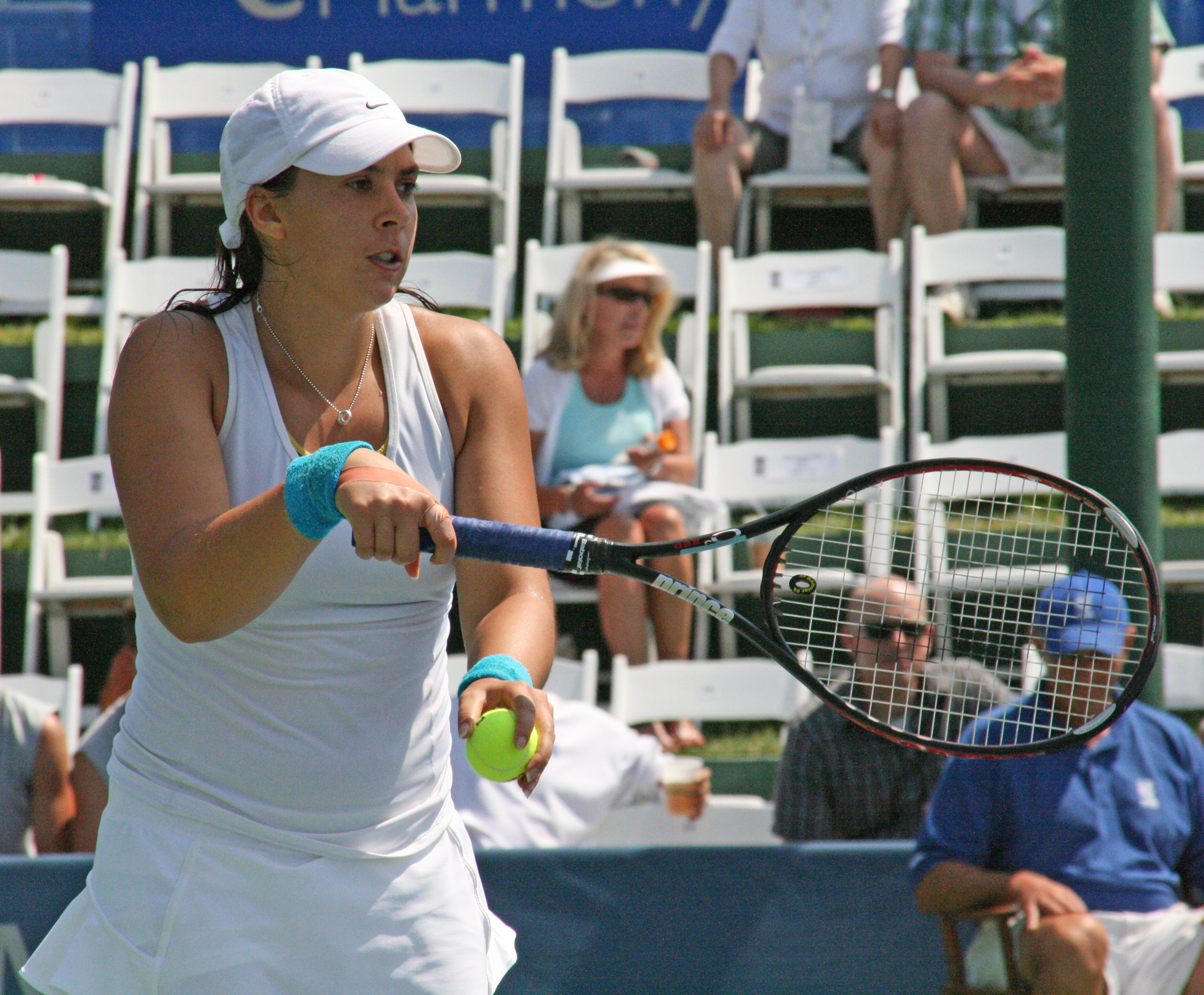
Marion Bartoli advances to the finals with a win over Date-Krumm

The first Semifinal match saw Frenchwoman Marion Bartoli and veteran Kimiko Date-Krumm. The first set was a total domination by the Frenchwoman as she broke all of the Japanese service game with her own serve getting broken once as she rallied to win the first set 6–1. The second set was the same as Bartoli raced off to a 5–0 lead, however Krumm became more aggressive winning the next three games, to push it to 5–3; however she lost to Bartoli 6–3 in the second set. Krumm committed 41 unforced errors to Bartoli's 17.

The second match saw another French player in Aravane Rezaï taking on María José Martínez Sánchez. The first set saw Rezaï dominating the Spanish player as she broke Martínez Sánchez twice in the first and fifth game, and lost only four points on serve and did not face a single break point. The second set was no different as Rezaï threatened the Martínez Sánchez serve early to lead 0–40 but Martínez Sánchez held her serve. Rezaï then won the next three games even, holding at love at the second game. The two then exchanged service holds up until the last game at 5–3. As Rezaï took a –40 lead and 3 match points, which she eventually converted to win the match 6–3. The match saw Rezaï unbothered by the left-handed serve as she fired out return winners one after another. Rezaï also significantly made more winners 24 to 8 and less unforced errors 14 to 21. Rezaï lost only seven points on serve in the entire match.

Matches on Center Court
Group	Winner	Loser	Score
Semi-Finals	(France) Marion Bartoli [1]	(Japan) Kimiko Date-Krumm [12]	6–1, 6–3
Semi-Finals	(France) Aravane Rezaï [10]	(Spain) María José Martínez Sánchez [6]	6–2, 6–3
1st Match Starts at 2:30PM

=== Day 5 ===
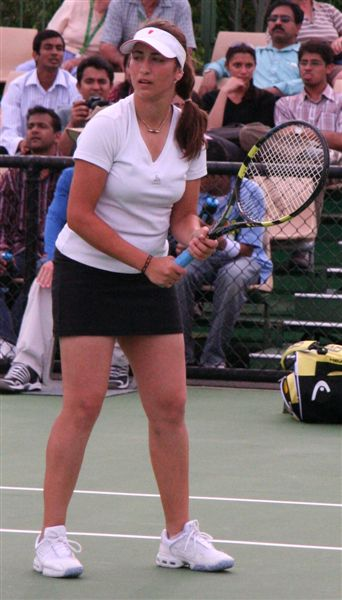
Aravane Rezaï wins her second title as Bartoli retires

The finals saw an all-French final since February 2006, when Amélie Mauresmo won over Mary Pierce. This was between top seed Marion Bartoli who claimed victories over Shahar Pe'er and Magdaléna Rybáriková in her Round robin matches and Kimiko Date-Krumm in semifinals, and hasn't drop a set yet in the tournament. She is facing a hot rising player in Aravane Rezaï who had wins over Sabine Lisicki and Melinda Czink in the round robin and María José Martínez Sánchez in Semifinals, Rezaï on the other hand hasn't lost a set since the first set lost against Lisicki. With a win in the match Bartoli will enter the top 10. Bartoli is leading their head-to-head 2–0 with their last meeting coming from the years Toray Pan Pacific Open 6–4, 6–2. The first 3 games saw both players holding their serve comfortably. However, after that Rezaï struggled with her serve as she needed as 1st serve every time as Bartoli was hitting return winners from the Rezaï second serve. The next three games went to Bartoli to lead 4–2 in the set. Then Rezaï and Bartoli both held comfortably to push it 5–3. At the 5–3 in the Rezaï serve she faced a set point after pushing a backhand down the line out but eventually led for a 5–4 set. The next two game saw Rezaï resurging to claim the next two games and push it to 15–40 in the Bartoli serve, from their Bartoli had a left leg issue which was checked by the medic as she Bartoli received a Medical timeout, however Bartoli wasn't able to continue as she doubled faulted due to her left leg injury in 15–40 to give the set to Rezaï, she was then seen limping and retiring from the match. This is Rezaï's second title of the year and her career.

Matches on Center Court
Group	Winner	Loser	Score
Finals	(France) Aravane Rezaï [10]	(France) Marion Bartoli [1]	7–5, retired
Match Starts at 2:30PM

== Singles champion ==
(France) Aravane Rezaï defeated (France) Marion Bartoli, 7–5, retired

- It was Rezaï's second title of the year and career
