= 2011 Commonwealth Bank Tournament of Champions =

- Date: 3–6 November
- Edition: 3rd
- Category: WTA Tournament of Champions
- Draw: 8S
- Surface: Hard / indoor
- Location: Bali, Indonesia

Champions
- (Serbia) Ana Ivanovic
← 2010 ·	WTA Tournament of Champions	· 2012 →

The 2011 Commonwealth Bank Tournament of Champions was a singles-only women's tennis tournament that was played on indoor hard courts. It was the third edition of the tournament and was part of the 2011 WTA Tour. It was held at the Bali International Convention Centre in Bali, Indonesia from November 3 through November 6, 2011. The 2011 edition was the last to be held in Bali before it relocated to Sofia in 2012. The tournament saw Ana Ivanovic successfully defend her title.

== Tournament ==
The 2011 Commonwealth Bank Tournament of Champions took place at the Bali International Convention Centre from 3–6 November 2011. It was the third edition of the event held in Bali. The tournament was run by the Women's Tennis Association (WTA), as part of the 2011 WTA Tour. It was the season-ending championship for players who had won one of the WTA International tournaments but did not qualify for the WTA Championships. The singles draw saw eight women qualify from the year, with the top four ranked players seeded. The other four players were randomly drawn against them in a straight knockout event, with the tournament starting in the quarterfinals. There was no doubles competition at this event. The 2012 edition took place in Sofia, Bulgaria.

== Points and prize money ==
The total prize money for the 2011 Commonwealth Bank Tournament of Champions is 600,000 United States dollars.

Stage	Prize Money	Points
Champion	$210,000	375
Finalist	$120,000	255
Third place	$70,000	180
Fourth place	$60,000*	165
Quarterfinalist	$35,000	75

- $50,000 in the event of default

== Qualifying ==
The 8 highest-ranked players who have captured at least one International tournament during the year and who are not participating in singles at the year-end WTA Championships in Istanbul will qualify for the event. However, at the tournament's discretion two of these players can be replaced with wildcards. On September 30, it was announced that defending champion, Ana Ivanovic, was awarded the first wildcard of the tournament. On October 20, the second wildcard of the tournament was awarded to Peng Shuai.

=== 2011 International tournament champions ===
Player	Nationality	Tournament/s Won
Petra Kvitová	Czech Republic	Brisbane; Linz
Gréta Arn	Hungary	Auckland
Jarmila Gajdošová	Australia	Hobart
Daniela Hantuchová	Slovakia	Pattaya City
Magdaléna Rybáriková	Slovakia	Memphis
Lourdes Domínguez Lino	Spain	Bogotá
Gisela Dulko	Argentina	Acapulco
Anastasia Pavlyuchenkova	Russia	Monterrey
Jelena Dokić	Australia	Kuala Lumpur
Victoria Azarenka	Belarus	Marbella; Luxembourg City
Alberta Brianti	Italy	Fes
Roberta Vinci	Italy	Barcelona 's-Hertogenbosch; Budapest
Anabel Medina Garrigues	Spain	Estoril; Palermo
Andrea Petkovic	Germany	Strasbourg
Sabine Lisicki	Germany	Birmingham; Dallas
Caroline Wozniacki	Denmark	Copenhagen
Polona Hercog	Slovenia	Båstad
María José Martínez Sánchez	Spain	Bad Gastein; Seoul
Vera Zvonareva	Russia	Baku
Nadia Petrova	Russia	Washington, D.C.
Ksenia Pervak	Russia	Tashkent
Barbora Záhlavová-Strýcová	Czech Republic	Quebec City
Chanelle Scheepers	South Africa	Guangzhou
Marion Bartoli	France	Osaka

=== Qualifiers ===
WTA singles rankings (24 October 2011)
Sd	Player	Rk	Won
1	(France) Marion Bartoli	9	Osaka
2	(China) Peng Shuai	16	Wild card
3	(Germany) Sabine Lisicki	18	Birmingham; Dallas
4	(Italy) Roberta Vinci	22	Barcelona 's-Hertogenbosch; Budapest
	(Slovakia) Daniela Hantuchová	23	Pattaya City
	(Serbia) Ana Ivanovic	26	Wild card
	(Spain) Anabel Medina Garrigues	28	Estoril; Palermo
	(Russia) Nadia Petrova	31	Washington, D.C.

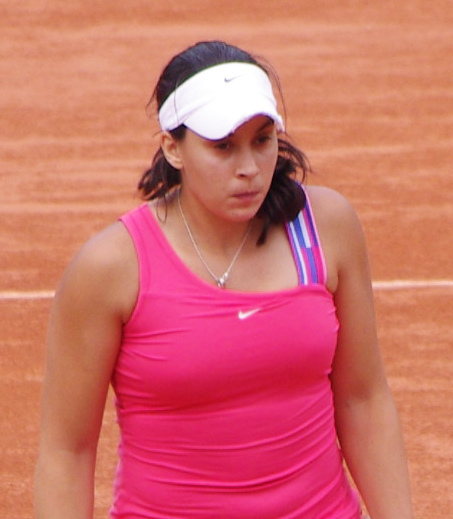
Marion Bartoli reached the semifinals of the French Open.

Marion Bartoli
Bartoli is making her second appearance at the championships after finishing runner-up at the inaugural Tournament of Champions in 2009. She has produced a good year, returning to the top 10 and reaching 14 quarterfinals, the most of any player. The Frenchwoman reached five finals in the year, winning two in the Aegon International over Petra Kvitová, 6–1, 4–6, 7–5, and the HP Open over Samantha Stosur, 6–3, 6–1, earning her a spot in the championships. She lost in the finals of the BNP Paribas Open to Caroline Wozniacki, the Internationaux de Strasbourg to Andrea Petkovic, and the Bank of the West Classic to Serena Williams. She also reached her second career Grand Slam semifinal at the French Open. At the other Grand Slams, she reached the quarterfinals of Wimbledon and the second rounds of the Australian Open and the US Open. Her biggest wins of the year were against Serena Williams and Kim Clijsters. She also barely missed originally qualifying for the WTA Tour Championships, but filled in for Maria Sharapova when she sprained her ankle.

Peng Shuai
Peng was one of the wildcard recipients in the tournament. She has had a consistent year and was able to crack the top 20 for the first time and reached a new career high of number 14 after reaching the quarterfinals of the Western & Southern Open. She reached her first premier-level final at the Brussels Open, losing to Caroline Wozniacki, 6–2, 3–6, 3–6. She also reached four other semifinals. She reached the fourth round of all the Grand Slams except the French Open, where she reached the third round. Her big wins of the year came against Li Na and Vera Zvonareva.

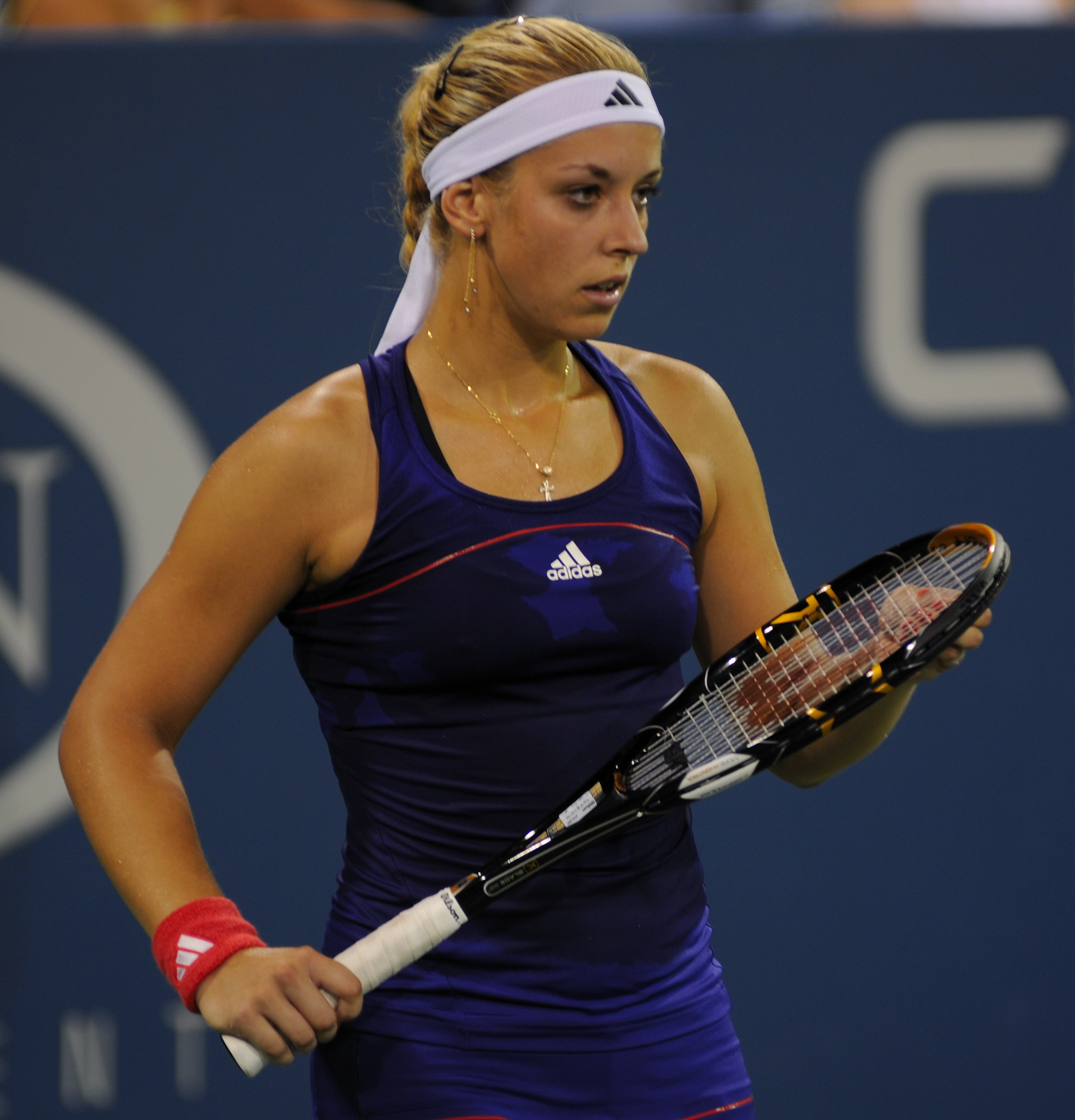
Sabine Lisicki reached her first career Slam semifinal.

Sabine Lisicki
Lisicki has had a breakthrough year, including improving her ranking from a low of no. 218 in March, to a career-best of no. 17 in September. She also won two titles in the year, the Aegon Classic over Daniela Hantuchová, 6–3, 6–2, and in the Texas Tennis Open over Aravane Rezaï, 6–2, 6–1, which made her qualify for the event. She made her maiden Grand Slam semifinal at Wimbledon before losing to Maria Sharapova, the first time a German woman had reached a Grand Slam semifinal since Steffi Graf there in 1999. She also reached the fourth round of the US Open and the second round of the French Open. She has earned top-10 wins over Samantha Stosur, Li Na, and Marion Bartoli.

Roberta Vinci
Vinci has had her best season to date, reaching a career high of no. 18 in the world and winning three titles, the third most singles titles in the season. Her titles were all international events, which was her pass to the event, winning in the Barcelona Ladies Open over Lucie Hradecká, 4–6, 6–2, 6–2, the UNICEF Open over Jelena Dokić, 6–7^{(7–9)}, 6–3, 7–5, and the Poli-Farbe Budapest Grand Prix, defeating Irina-Camelia Begu, 6–4, 1–6, 6–4. However, she has had an inconsistent year, including losing eight in a row before winning Barcelona. At the Grand Slams, she reached the first round of the Australian Open and reached the third rounds of the other slams. She earned her biggest win of her career by defeating world no. 1 Caroline Wozniacki in the third round of the Rogers Cup.

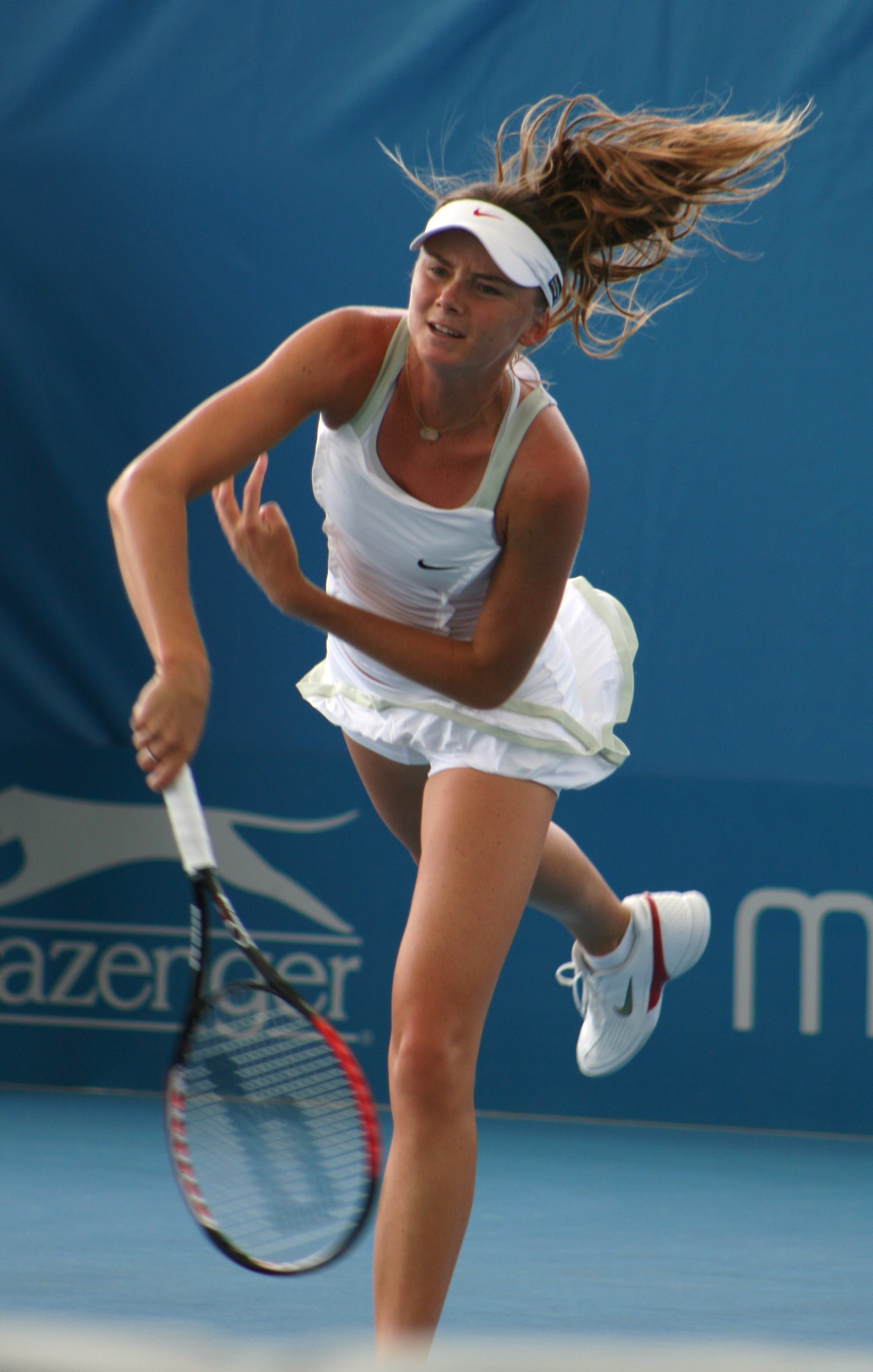
Daniela Hantuchová earns her first win over a World no.1.

Daniela Hantuchová
Hantuchová has had a bad start of the season, losing her first four matches, before triumphing in the PTT Pattaya Open over Sara Errani, 6–0, 6–2, without dropping a set in the tournament. It was also her first title since October 2007. She also reached the final of the Aegon Classic, losing to Sabine Lisicki, 3–6, 2–6. She had mixed results in the Grand Slams, losing in the fourth round of the French Open, third round of the Wimbledon, and the first rounds of the Australian Open and the US Open. She claimed major upsets across the year, including defeating Caroline Wozniacki, her first win against a reigning world no. 1, and claiming her first win over Venus Williams in 11 matches. She also had top-10 victories against Vera Zvonareva, Li Na, Marion Bartoli, and Victoria Azarenka.

Ana Ivanovic

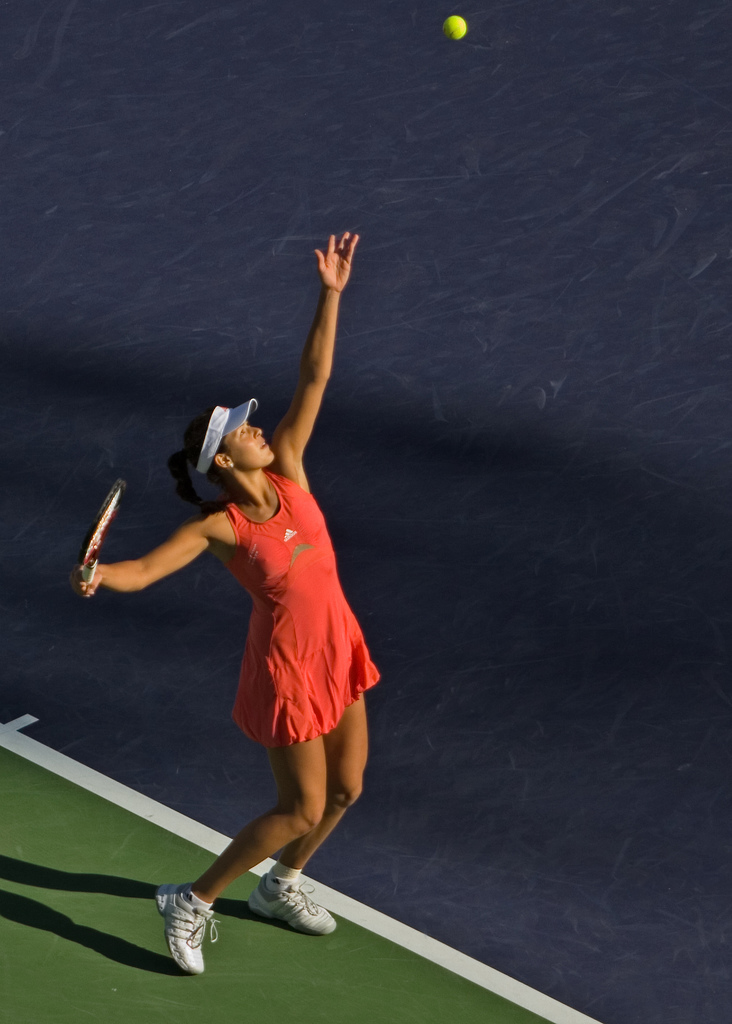
Ana Ivanovic is the defending champion.

Ivanovic is the defending champion, after defeating Alisa Kleybanova in the final, and is one of the wildcard recipients. The Serb endured a horror 2011 season, being the only one not to reach a final in the field and only made it to two semifinals in the Aegon Classic and the Mercury Insurance Open. However, she was able to go deep in two Premier Mandatory, reaching the quarterfinals of the BNP Paribas Open and the China Open. She was also able to earn top 10 victories over Jelena Janković and Vera Zvonareva. Her performances at the Grand Slams were very poor, being defeated in the first round of the Australian and French Opens, the third round at Wimbledon and the fourth round of the US Open. She won only four Grand Slam matches the entire year (not including a walkover victory against Petra Cetkovská, who withdrew from their second round match at the US Open due to injury), one less than her tally from 2010.

Anabel Medina Garrigues
Medina Garrigues is competing for the second time, the first being in 2009. She has won two titles in the year, winning her first titles in three years. She won the Estoril Open, defeating Kristina Barrois, 6–1, 6–2, and the Internazionali Femminili di Palermo, defeating Polona Hercog, 6–3, 6–2. These wins made her the player with most clay titles of all active players with 10, surpassing Venus Williams. Her title at Palermo was her fifth at the event, and she became only the fourth active player to win the same tournament five times. In the Grand Slams, she reached the first round of the Australian Open, second round of the French Open, the first round at Wimbledon, and the third round of the US Open. She has beaten two top-20 players in the year, Shahar Pe'er and Marion Bartoli.

Nadia Petrova
Petrova is one of the debutants in the event. She won her first title since November 2008 at the Citi Open, defeating Shahar Pe'er in the final, 7–5, 6–2. This made her qualify for the event. However, she has only reached two other quarterfinals. At the Grand Slams, she reached the fourth round at Wimbledon, the third rounds of the Australian Open and the US Open, and the first round of the French Open. She has beaten top-20 players, Roberta Vinci, Ana Ivanovic, and Anastasia Pavlyuchenkova.

== Player head-to-head ==
Below are the head-to-head records as they approached the tournament.

		Bartoli	Peng	Lisicki	Vinci	Hantuchová	Ivanovic	Medina Garrigues	Petrova	Overall	YTD
1	(France) Marion Bartoli		5–3	1–3	0–1	1–5	3–4	6–2	2–1	18–19	57–24
2	(China) Peng Shuai	3–5		0–2	0–1	0–1	0–3	3–0	3–2	9–14	53–20
3	(Germany) Sabine Lisicki	3–1	2–0		0–0	1–1	0–0	0–0	1–0	7–2	47–17
4	(Italy) Roberta Vinci	1–0	1–0	0–0		2–1	2–4	3–1	1–2	10–8	37–25
5	(Slovakia) Daniela Hantuchová	5–1	1–0	1–1	1–2		2–4	3–1	3–4	16–13	41–28
6	(Serbia) Ana Ivanovic	4–3	3–0	0–0	4–2	4–2		2–1	6–5	23–13	29–20
7	(Spain) Anabel Medina Garrigues	2–6	0–3	0–0	1–3	1–3	1–2		1–2	6–19	38–22
8	(Russia) Nadia Petrova	1–2	2–3	0–1	2–1	4–3	5–6	2–1		16–17	24–20

== Draw ==
2011 Commonwealth Bank Tournament of Champions
- 2011 Commonwealth Bank Tournament of Champions

Final
- Champion: (Serbia) Ana Ivanovic
- Runner-up: (Spain) Anabel Medina Garrigues
- Score: 6–3, 6–0

Events
Singles
← 2010 ·	WTA Tournament of Champions	· 2012 →

Day 1
In the first match of the tournament, Nadia Petrova upset second-seed and wildcard Peng Shuai. Petrova lost her serve on four occasions but managed to break her Chinese opponent seven times to win in straight sets, 6–4, 6–3. Defending champion Ana Ivanovic soon followed suit, upsetting fourth-seeded veteran Roberta Vinci, also in straight sets 6–3, 6–3, to set up a meeting with Petrova in the semifinals.

Day 2
Anabel Medina Garrigues opened the second day of action by defeating top seed Marion Bartoli, ending an eighteen match losing streak against top 10 opponents. The Spaniard saved match points against Bartoli in the second set, who retired after being down 0–1 in the third set. Bartoli had taken the first set and was 5–2 down in the second before battling back to force a tiebreak and holding two match points. In the final match of the opening rounds, 3rd seed Sabine Lisicki became the only seed to win. The German saved set point in the first set against Daniela Hantuchová, before sealing a straight sets win.

Day 3
In the first semifinal, Ivanovic won 8 of the first 9 games to lead Petrova by a set and a break. However Petrova responded and held set point at 5–4 in the second set, but the Serb eventually saved it, and closed the match out, 6–1, 7–5, to advance to her first WTA final of the year. In the second match, Medina Garrigues began greatly, snatching the opening set, 6–3, before the 3rd seeded German fired back to take the second set, 6–4. Having fallen down 4–0 in the decider, and sustaining a mid-back injury since the second-set, Lisicki retired, allowing the Spaniard to advance to her biggest final of the year.

Day 4
In the final Ivanovic successfully defended her title in just over an hour. The Serb broke early in the first set and easily won the second set, losing only seven points, to claim the title. Earlier in the day Nadia Petrova claimed third place when Sabine Lisicki withdrew from their match before it began. Instead Petrova played an exhibition match with Daniela Hantuchová, which the Russian won in three sets, taking the final set 6–0.

First round
1	(France) Marion Bartoli	6	6^{7}	0^{r}
(Spain) Anabel Medina Garrigues	4	7^{9}	1
3	(Germany) Sabine Lisicki	7	6
(Slovakia) Daniela Hantuchová	5	2
WC	(Serbia) Ana Ivanovic	6	6
4	(Italy) Roberta Vinci	3	3
(Russia) Nadia Petrova	6	6
2/WC	(China) Peng Shuai	4	3

Semifinals
(Spain) Anabel Medina Garrigues	6	4	4
3	(Germany) Sabine Lisicki	3	6	0^{r}
WC	(Serbia) Ana Ivanovic	6	7
(Russia) Nadia Petrova	1	5

Final
(Spain) Anabel Medina Garrigues	3	0
WC	(Serbia) Ana Ivanovic	6	6
Third place match
3	(Germany) Sabine Lisicki
(Russia) Nadia Petrova	w/o

== See also ==
- Commonwealth Bank Tournament of Champions
- 2011 WTA Tour
