= 2009 Grand Prix SAR La Princesse Lalla Meryem – Doubles =

Doubles
- 2009 Grand Prix SAR La Princesse Lalla Meryem

Final
- Champion: (Russia) Alisa Kleybanova (Russia) Ekaterina Makarova
- Runner-up: (Romania) Sorana Cîrstea (Russia) Maria Kirilenko
- Score: 6–3, 2–6, 10–8

Details
- Draw: 16
- Seeds: 4

Events
Singles	Doubles
- Morocco Open

Sorana Cîrstea and Anastasia Pavlyuchenkova were the defending champions. Both were present that year, but competed with different partners.
Cirstea partnered with Maria Kirilenko, but lost in the final to Alisa Kleybanova and Ekaterina Makarova, 6–3, 2–6, 10–8.
Pavlyuchenkova partnered with Aravane Rezaï, but were forced to concede to a walkover before the first round match against Polona Hercog and Ioana Raluca Olaru.

== Seeds ==
1. (Romania) Sorana Cîrstea / (Russia) Maria Kirilenko (final)
2. (Russia) Alisa Kleybanova / (Russia) Ekaterina Makarova (champions)
3. (Czech Republic) Petra Cetkovská / (Czech Republic) Lucie Hradecká (first round)
4. (Russia) Maria Kondratieva / (France) Sophie Lefèvre (semifinals)

== Draw ==
Key

- Q = Qualifier
- WC = Wild card
- LL = Lucky loser
- Alt = Alternate
- ITF = ITF entry
- PR = Protected ranking
- SR = Special ranking
- SE = Special exempt
- JE = Junior exempt
- JR = Junior Accelerator Programme entrant
- CO = College Accelerator Programme entrant
- NG = Next Gen Accelerator Program entrant
- w/o = Walkover
- r = Retired
- d = Defaulted

=== Finals ===
First round
1	(Romania) S Cîrstea (Russia) M Kirilenko	6	6
(Spain) E Fernández Brugués (France) L Thorpe	4	4
(Hungary) M Czink (United Kingdom) A Keothavong	6	3	[10]
WC	(Morocco) L Bennani (Morocco) N Lalami	0	6	[6]
3	(Czech Republic) P Cetkovská (Czech Republic) L Hradecká	2	4
(Estonia) M Ani (Italy) R Vinci	6	6
(Slovenia) P Hercog (Romania) IR Olaru	w/o
(Russia) A Pavlyuchenkova (France) A Rezaï
(Slovakia) J Groth (Czech Republic) K Zakopalová	6	6
(Poland) M Domachowska (Poland) U Radwańska	4	4
WC	(Morocco) FZ El Allami (Germany) AP Schaefer	1	0
4	(Russia) M Kondratieva (France) S Lefèvre	6	6
(France) C Pin (France) A Védy	7	6
(Russia) V Diatchenko (Serbia) T Mirčić	6^{3}	2
(Hungary) A Kapros (Russia) M Shamayko	3	5
2	(Russia) A Kleybanova (Russia) E Makarova	6	7

Quarterfinals
1	(Romania) S Cîrstea (Russia) M Kirilenko	6	5	[10]
(Hungary) M Czink (United Kingdom) A Keothavong	1	7	[7]
(Estonia) M Ani (Italy) R Vinci	2	2
(Slovenia) P Hercog (Romania) IR Olaru	6	6
(Slovakia) J Groth (Czech Republic) K Zakopalová	0	3
4	(Russia) M Kondratieva (France) S Lefèvre	6	6
(France) C Pin (France) A Védy	6	4	[16]
2	(Russia) A Kleybanova (Russia) E Makarova	2	6	[18]

Semifinals
1	(Romania) S Cîrstea (Russia) M Kirilenko	6	6
(Slovenia) P Hercog (Romania) IR Olaru	1	2
4	(Russia) M Kondratieva (France) S Lefèvre	3	2
2	(Russia) A Kleybanova (Russia) E Makarova	6	6

Final
1	(Romania) S Cîrstea (Russia) M Kirilenko	3	6	[8]
2	(Russia) A Kleybanova (Russia) E Makarova	6	2	[10]
