= 2009 Grand Prix SAR La Princesse Lalla Meryem – Singles =

Singles
- 2009 Grand Prix SAR La Princesse Lalla Meryem

Final
- Champion: (Spain) Anabel Medina Garrigues
- Runner-up: (Russia) Ekaterina Makarova
- Score: 6–0, 6–1

Details
- Draw: 32
- Seeds: 8

Events
Singles	Doubles
- Morocco Open

Gisela Dulko was the defending champion, but chose to participate in the Porsche Tennis Grand Prix which was held the same week.

In the final, Anabel Medina Garrigues defeated Ekaterina Makarova, 6–0, 6–1.

== Seeds ==
1. (Spain) Anabel Medina Garrigues (champion)
2. (Russia) Alisa Kleybanova (semifinals)
3. (Russia) Anastasia Pavlyuchenkova (second round)
4. (Russia) Maria Kirilenko (first round)
5. (Romania) Sorana Cîrstea (first round)
6. (Russia) Ekaterina Makarova (final)
7. (Italy) Roberta Vinci (second round)
8. (Israel) Shahar Pe'er (second round)

== Draw ==
Key

- Q = Qualifier
- WC = Wild card
- LL = Lucky loser
- Alt = Alternate
- ITF = ITF entry
- PR = Protected ranking
- SR = Special ranking
- SE = Special exempt
- JE = Junior exempt
- JR = Junior Accelerator Programme entrant
- CO = College Accelerator Programme entrant
- NG = Next Gen Accelerator Program entrant
- w/o = Walkover
- r = Retired
- d = Defaulted

=== Finals ===
Semifinals
1/WC	(Spain) Anabel Medina Garrigues	6	0
(Hungary) Melinda Czink	0	0^{r}
6	(Russia) Ekaterina Makarova	6	6
2	(Russia) Alisa Kleybanova	2	1

Final
1/WC	(Spain) Anabel Medina Garrigues	6	6
6	(Russia) Ekaterina Makarova	0	1

=== Top half ===
First round
1/WC	(Spain) A Medina Garrigues	6	6
(France) C Pin	1	1
(Czech Republic) K Zakopalová	7	6
(Poland) U Radwańska	5	2
(United Kingdom) A Keothavong	6	7
(Estonia) M Ani	2	6^{3}
(Spain) L Domínguez Lino	6	6
5	(Romania) S Cîrstea	3	4
3	(Russia) A Pavlyuchenkova	6	6
(Kazakhstan) G Voskoboeva	1	2
Q	(Italy) N Viérin	6	2	0
(Hungary) M Czink	3	6	6
(Czech Republic) L Hradecká	6	6
WC	(Morocco) N Lalami	4	3
(France) A Rezaï	4	6	4
8	(Israel) S Pe'er	6	2	6

Second round
1/WC	(Spain) A Medina Garrigues	1	7	6
(Czech Republic) K Zakopalová	6	6^{1}	3
(United Kingdom) A Keothavong	6	5	3
(Spain) L Domínguez Lino	4	7	6
3	(Russia) A Pavlyuchenkova	6^{1}	6	3
(Hungary) M Czink	7	3	6
(Czech Republic) L Hradecká	6	6
8	(Israel) S Pe'er	4	1

Quarterfinals
1/WC	(Spain) A Medina Garrigues	7	7
(Spain) L Domínguez Lino	6^{5}	6^{5}
(Hungary) M Czink	6	6
(Czech Republic) L Hradecká	4	2

Semifinals
1/WC	(Spain) A Medina Garrigues	6	0
(Hungary) M Czink	0	0^{r}

=== Bottom half ===
First round
6	(Russia) E Makarova	7	6
(Romania) IR Olaru	6^{5}	4
(Japan) A Morigami	2	5
WC	(Morocco) FZ El Allami	6	5^{r}
(Czech Republic) P Cetkovská	6	4	2
LL	(Spain) E Fernández Brugués	2	6	6
(Poland) M Domachowska	6	6
4	(Russia) M Kirilenko	4	4
7	(Italy) R Vinci	2	6	6
(Colombia) M Duque Mariño	6	4	1
Q	(Slovenia) P Hercog	6	6
LL	(Russia) V Diatchenko	1	2
(Slovakia) J Groth	6	7
Q	(Spain) P Fondevila Castro	3	5
Q	(Italy) C Dentoni	2	4
2	(Russia) A Kleybanova	6	6

Second round
6	(Russia) E Makarova	6	6
(Japan) A Morigami	0	1
LL	(Spain) E Fernández Brugués	4	4
(Poland) M Domachowska	6	6
7	(Italy) R Vinci	2	4
Q	(Slovenia) P Hercog	6	6
(Slovakia) J Groth	4	1
2	(Russia) A Kleybanova	6	6

Quarterfinals
6	(Russia) E Makarova	6	6
(Poland) M Domachowska	4	4
Q	(Slovenia) P Hercog	3	4
2	(Russia) A Kleybanova	6	6

Semifinals
6	(Russia) E Makarova	6	6
2	(Russia) A Kleybanova	2	1
