= WTA Tournament of Champions =

Women's tennis tournament

Tournament information
- Founded: 2009
- Abolished: 2014
- Location: Sofia; Bulgaria
- Venue: Armeets Arena
- Category: International
- Surface: Hard / indoors
- Draw: 8S
- Prize money: US$ 750,000
- Website: sofia-tennis.bg

WTA Tournament of Champions was a women's season ending tennis tournament for players who have won one or more of the WTA International tournaments during the year but did not qualify for the WTA Championships. The Tournament of Champions took place from 2009 until 2014; it was then replaced by a new format year-end tournament: the WTA Elite Trophy.

== History ==
It debuted in 2009 at the Bali International Convention Centre on November 4–8 and was a part of the 2009 WTA Tour. The first edition of the tournament featured a 12-woman round robin singles format (four groups of three players, then single-elimination semifinals and final), and offered both US$600,000, €500,000 in prize money and a chance to earn a €1-million bonus for qualified players who won three or more international tournaments. For its second edition, the tournament featured an eight-woman draw with players having only one opportunity to reach the semifinals, where the remaining four women would compete for the first, second, third, and fourth place prizes. The event replaced the Commonwealth Bank Tennis Classic in Bali (a former Tier III tournament).

For the 2009 edition, the 10 highest-ranked players who had captured at least one International-level tournament during the year and who were not participating in singles at the year-end WTA Tour Championships – Doha 2009 qualified for the event, along with two wildcards. For the 2010 edition, only the top-8 ranked women qualified for the event, with the tournament having the possibility to replace competitors with wildcards of their choice.

The WTA Tournament of Champions took place in Bali from the inaugural edition in 2009 until 2011. Since 2012 the tournament was held in Sofia, Bulgaria.

Since 2015, the WTA Tournament of Champions was replaced by a new format: the WTA Elite Trophy. The singles competition will feature a four-group round-robin format consisting of players ranked from ninth to 19th in the world plus one wildcard; followed by the semifinals and final. The tournament will also include a doubles tournament featuring six teams split into two groups followed by a final.

== Venues ==
Town	Years	Stadium	Surface	Capacity
(Indonesia) Nusa Dua, Bali	2009–2011	Bali International Convention Centre	Hard (i)	8,000
(Bulgaria) Sofia	2012–2014	Armeets Arena	Hard (i)	13,545

== Past results ==
=== Singles ===
Venue	Year	Champion	Runner-up	Score
(Indonesia) Bali	2009	(France) Aravane Rezaï	(France) Marion Bartoli	7–5, retired
(Indonesia) Bali	2010	(Serbia) Ana Ivanovic	(Russia) Alisa Kleybanova	6–2, 7–6^{(7–5)}
(Indonesia) Bali	2011	(Serbia) Ana Ivanovic (2)	(Spain) Anabel Medina Garrigues	6–3, 6–0
(Bulgaria) Sofia	2012	(Russia) Nadia Petrova	(Denmark) Caroline Wozniacki	6–2, 6–1
(Bulgaria) Sofia	2013	(Romania) Simona Halep	(Australia) Samantha Stosur	2–6, 6–2, 6–2
(Bulgaria) Sofia	2014	(Germany) Andrea Petkovic	(Italy) Flavia Pennetta	1–6, 6–4, 6–3
