= 2010 Commonwealth Bank Tournament of Champions =

- Date: November 4–7
- Edition: 2nd
- Category: WTA Tournament of Champions
- Location: Bali, Indonesia

Champions
- (Serbia) Ana Ivanovic
| ← 2009 · | WTA Tournament of Champions | · 2011 → |

The 2010 Commonwealth Bank Tournament of Champions was a singles tennis tournament played on indoor hard courts. It was the second edition of the =tournament and was part of the 2010 WTA Tour. It was held at the Bali International Convention Centre in Bali, Indonesia from November 4 through November 7, 2010.

Aravane Rezaï was the defending champion and this year's second seed, however she was eliminated by Alisa Kleybanova in the quarterfinals. The result of this game was 6–1, 6–2, for Russian player.

Unseeded Ana Ivanovic reached the final, after wins against Anastasia Pavlyuchenkova and Kimiko Date-Krumm. She upset Alisa Kleybanova 6–2, 7–6^{(7–5)} in her last match to become the new champion. Ivanovic's victory lifted her back into the WTA's Top 20 for the first time in over a year, this followed a dismal year of poor form and injuries which saw her fall to as low as world No. 65 by July, only two years after holding the world No. 1 ranking.

== Tournament format ==
This edition of the tournament used a different format from the 2009 Commonwealth Bank Tournament of Champions and the 2010 WTA Tour Championships. The tournament consisted of a singles draw of eight players (including two wild card spots) in a single elimination format determined by the WTA. The top six ranked singles players as of the Monday the week prior to the tournament, who have won an International Tournament singles event during the current tour year and have not qualified for entry into the WTA Tour Championships singles draw qualified for the International Tournament of Champions. The final two alternates in the WTA Tour Championships were eligible to play the International Tournament of Champions, even if they participated in matches in the WTA Tour Championships. In the event any of the top six ranked players do not compete in the International Tournament of Champions, the open spot(s) shall be filled by the next player who would have been accepted in accordance with the above requirements. The tournament shall be permitted to nominate as Wild Cards up to two WTA Tour players who played at least one International Tournament singles event during the current tour year and did not qualify for entry into the WTA Tour Championships singles draw.

== Qualifiers ==
WTA singles rankings (1 November 2010)
| Sd | Player | Rk | Won |
| 1 | (China) Li Na | 11 | Aegon Classic |
| 2 | (France) Aravane Rezaï | 18 | Swedish Open |
| 3 | (Russia) Anastasia Pavlyuchenkova | 20 | Monterrey Open; İstanbul Cup |
| 4 | (Belgium) Yanina Wickmayer | 22 | ASB Classic |
| | (Serbia) Ana Ivanovic | 24 | Generali Ladies Linz |
| | (Russia) Alisa Kleybanova | 27 | Malaysian Open; Hansol Korea Open |
| | (Slovakia) Daniela Hantuchová | 31 | Wildcard |
| | (Japan) Kimiko Date-Krumm | 53 | Wildcard |

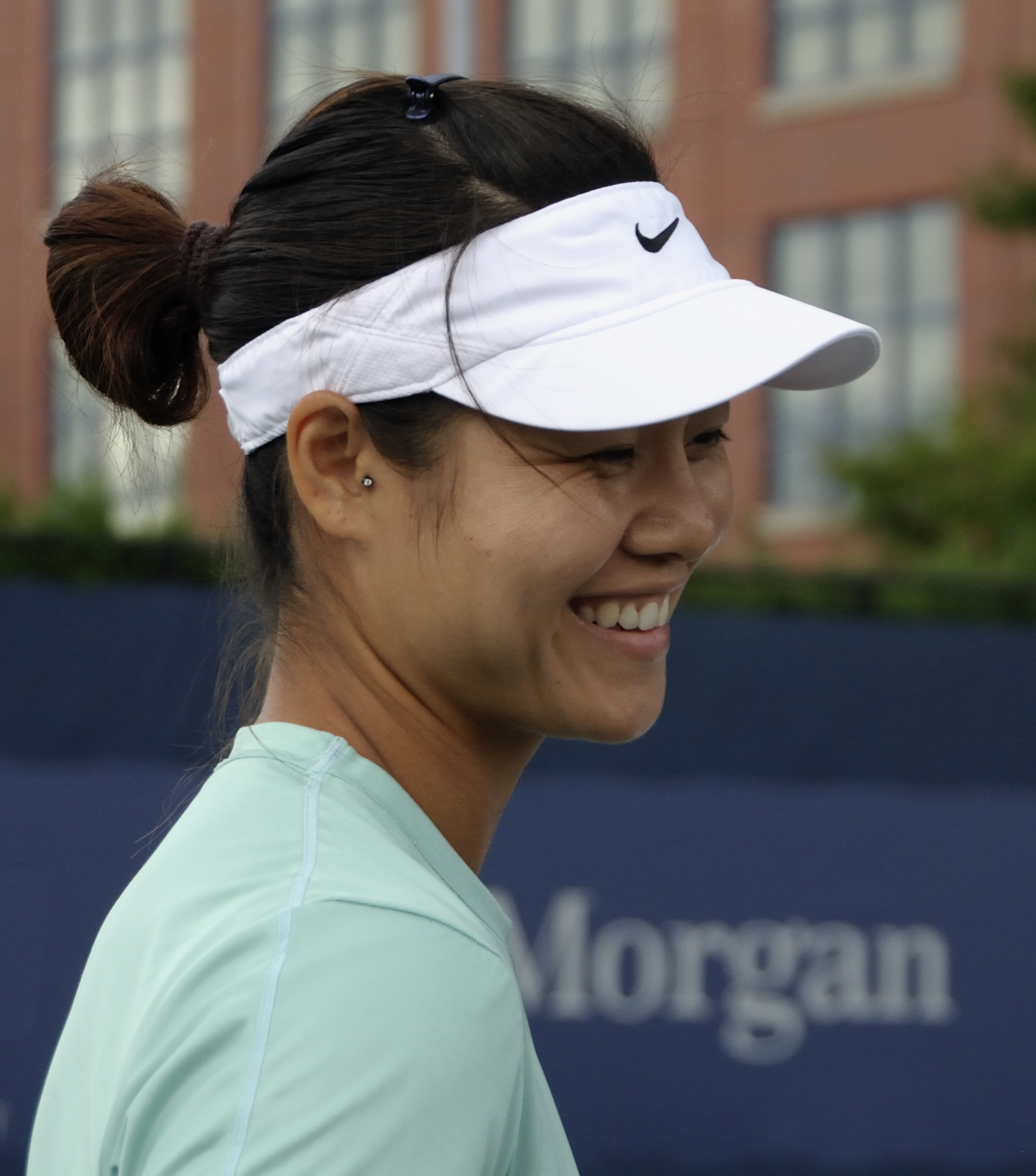
Li Na won the 2010 Aegon Classic by defeating Maria Sharapova.

Li Na
The Chinese player has produced her best season so far, becoming the highest ranked Chinese player ever, reaching a career high of world no. 9 in August this year. She started the year off by reaching the semi-finals of the Australian Open, where she lost to eventual champion Serena Williams, 7–6(4), 7–6(1). She also reached the quarterfinals at Wimbledon for the second time, but also ended up losing to Serena Williams, 7–5, 6–3. She earned her spot in the tournament by winning the Aegon Classic, defeating Maria Sharapova, 7–5, 6–1 in the final. This was her first title in 18 months, and her third career title. At the other Slams she fell in the third round of the French Open and first round of the US Open. Li narrowly missed qualifying for the 2010 WTA Tour Championships at Doha, Qatar after she was overtaken by Victoria Azarenka in the Points race.

Aravane Rezaï
Rezaï is the defending champion, after defeating Bartoli last year. She has entered the top 15 for the first time this year. Rezaï won her most prestigious title of her career yet, at the Mutua Madrileña Madrid Open- a Premier Mandatory Tournament where she scored wins over former world no. 1's Justine Henin, 4–6 7–5 6–0 in the first round, Jelena Janković 7–5, 6–4 in the quarterfinals, and Venus Williams 6–2, 7–5 in the finals. The Frenchwoman earned her spot in the tournament by winning the Swedish Open, defeating Gisela Dulko 6–3, 4–6, 6–4. In the Slams she reached the second round of all slams with the exception of the French Open, where she reached the third round.

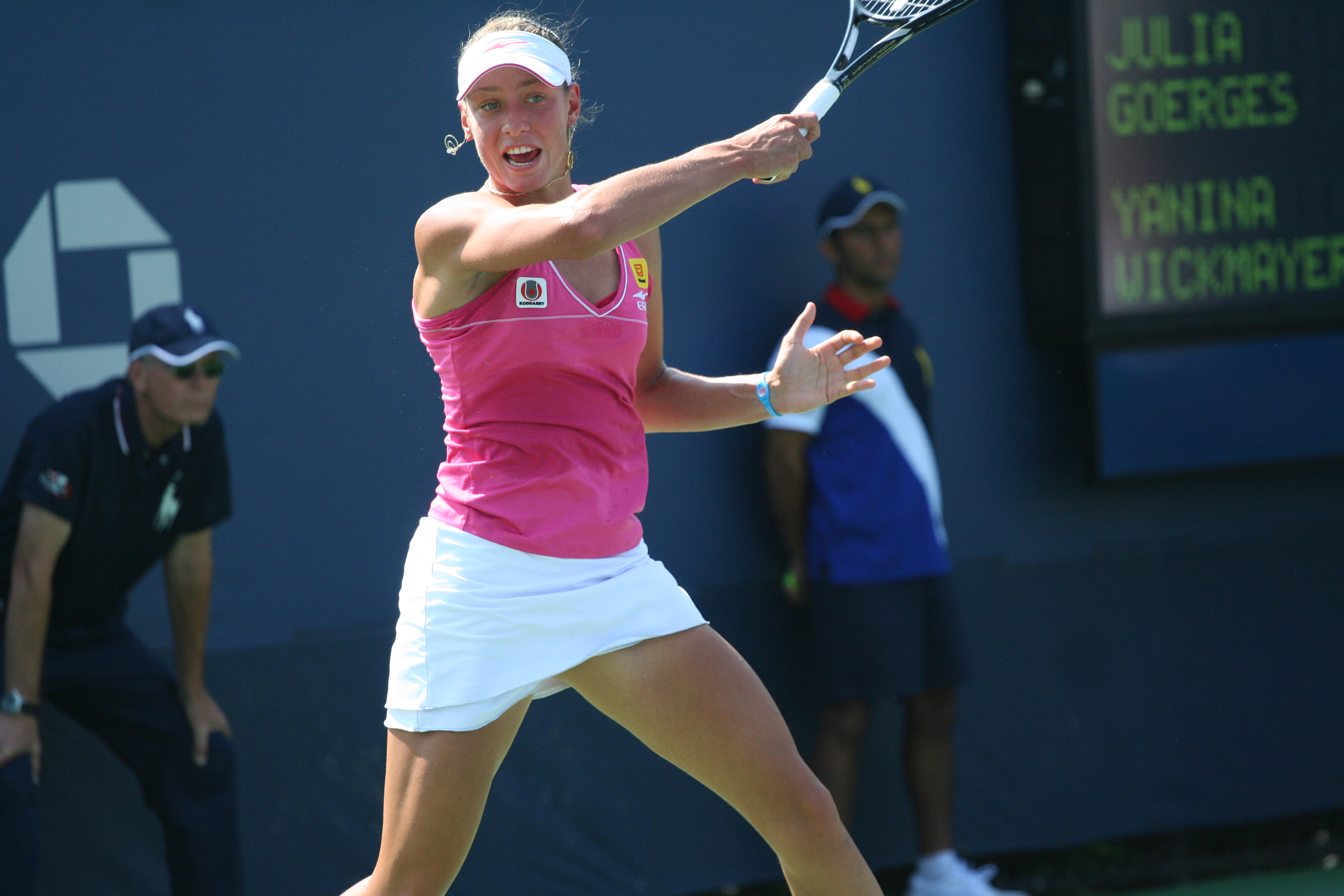
Yanina Wickmayer won the 2010 ASB Classic by beating Italian Flavia Pennetta.

Yanina Wickmayer
The Belgian makes her second appearance at Bali this year, and will be looking to put last year's nightmares behind her. Still dealing with the consequences from her drug ban, Wickmayer made a great start to the season, winning the ASB Classic without dropping a set, beating top seed Flavia Pennetta, 6–3 6–2 in the final. As a final consequence to last year's issues in this tournament, Wickmayer had to go through qualifying at the Australian Open. But nonetheless, she proved worthy of a seeding spot, reaching the fourth round of the Grand Slam, eventually losing to finalist, and fellow Belgian, Justine Henin. She reached a career-high of world no. 12 in April, but subsequently began falling down the rankings when she was unable to defend her semi-final points at the US Open, losing to 31st seed Kaia Kanepi 0–6, 7–6(2), 6–1. In her other slam results she reached the third round of both the French Open and Wimbledon.

Anastasia Pavlyuchenkova
The Russian made a breakthrough this year, cracking the top 20 for the first time in her career. She was also able to win her first two career titles at the Monterrey Open over Daniela Hantuchová, 1–6, 6–1, 6–0, and in the İstanbul Cup, where she defeated fellow Russian Elena Vesnina 5–7, 7–5, 6–4 in the final, earning her a spot in the Tournament of Champions. She was also able to reach her first Grand Slam fourth round at the US Open, where she lost to Francesca Schiavone 6–3, 6–0. In slams she was able to reach the second round of the Australian Open and the third round of French Open and Wimbledon. She was also able to earn upset victories over Francesca Schiavone and Elena Dementieva.

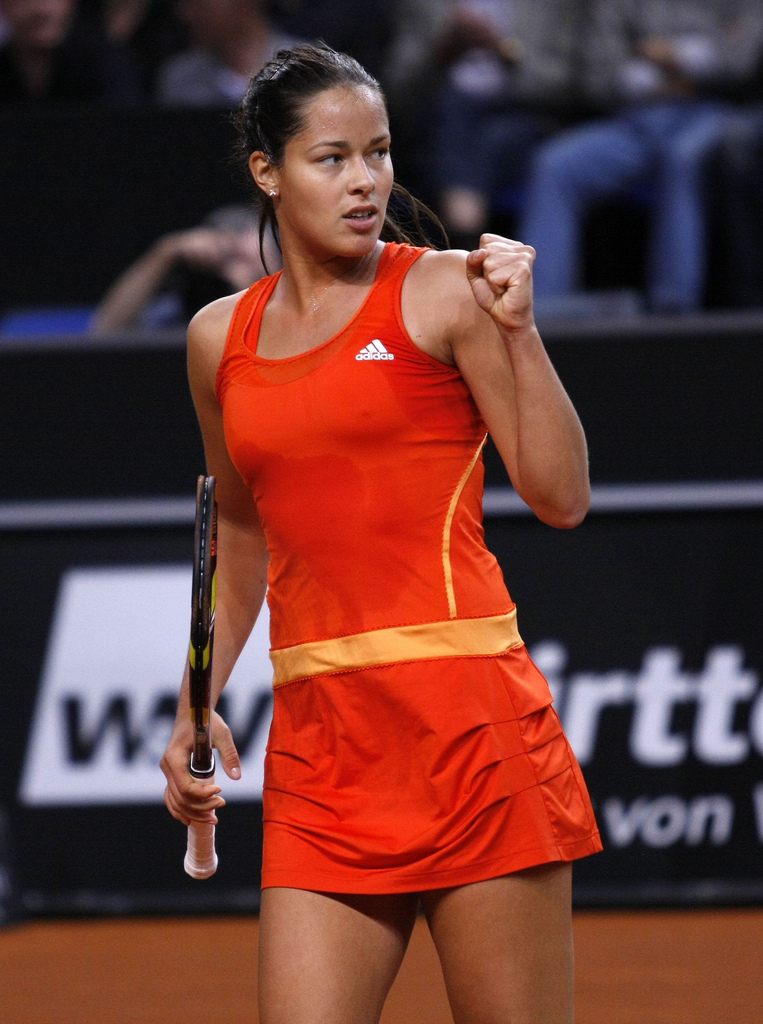
Ana Ivanovic won the 2010 Generali Ladies Linz by defeating Patty Schnyder. It was her first title in two years.

Ana Ivanovic
Ivanovic had a poor first half of the year, although she was able to reach the semifinals of her first tournament during the season at the Brisbane International. Ivanovic's performances at the Grand Slams tournaments were dismal; apart from reaching the fourth round of the US Open (losing to the eventual champion Kim Clijsters), she was defeated in the second round at Australian and French Opens and in the first round at Wimbledon, in the process winning a total of only five Grand Slam matches. However, Ivanovic reached the semifinals at Internazionali BNL d'Italia and W&S Financial Group Masters and Women's Open (withdrawing due to a foot injury) to improve in the rankings after falling to as low as World No. 65 by July. Ivanovic finally won her first tournament in two years in Generali Ladies Linz defeating Patty Schnyder 6–1, 6–2, in just 45 minutes. Ivanovic's climb back up the rankings continued as she returned to the Top 25 before this tournament. During the year, Ivanovic was able to score notable victories over Victoria Azarenka, Elena Dementieva, (twice each, and both of whom qualified for the year-end championships in Doha), Zheng Jie, Marion Bartoli and her first career victory against Alisa Kleybanova after three defeats.

Alisa Kleybanova

Kleybanova made a breakthrough this year, winning her first two career titles, which earned her a spot in the tournament of champions. She won the Malaysian Open, defeating top seed Elena Dementieva 6–3 6–2 in the final, and the Hansol Korea Open, this time, beating Klára Zakopalová 6–1, 6–3 in the final. The Russian earned a victory over then world no. 2 Jelena Janković, which is the highest ranked player she has ever defeated. Kleybanova was also able to score wins against Kim Clijsters, Nadia Petrova and Ana Ivanovic. Kleybanova had her most consistent results in the slams so far, reaching the third round of all the Slams except for the US Open where she was defeated by Sara Errani in the second round.

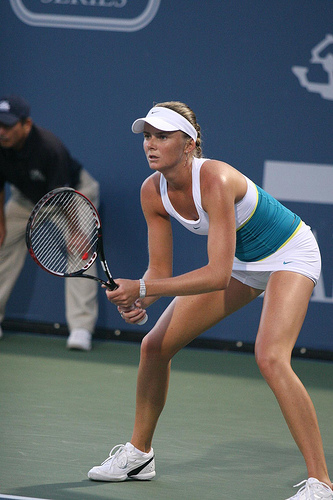
Daniela Hantuchová is one of the Wild Card entries of the tournament

Daniela Hantuchová
Hantuchová has had good results this year, reaching her first final in over 2 and a half years in the Monterrey open, but subsequently lost to Anastasia Pavlyuchenkova 1–6, 6–1, 6–0. She was also able to earn victories over top 10 players- twice against Jelena Janković and once against Elena Dementieva, who were both world no. 7 then. She also earned wins against Nadia Petrova, Yanina Wickmayer, Marion Bartoli, and Dinara Safina. At the slams, she was able to reach the fourth round of the French Open, second round of Wimbledon and the third round of hardcourt slams of US Open and Australian Open. However, due to inconsistencies, she was not able to make a comeback into the top 20, and in fact has just dropped out of the Top 30. She will attempt to finish the year in the Top 30, after accepting a wild card invitation from this tournament.

Kimiko Date-Krumm
Date-Krumm made history by being the second oldest player to ever win a singles title in the WTA Tour, and the oldest player to ever defeat a top ten player, when she upset former world no. 1 Dinara Safina in the first round of the French Open 3–6, 6–4, 7–5. She also had a notable win over former world no. 1 Maria Sharapova, in the Toray Pan Pacific Open 7–5, 3–6, 6–3 She reached her only final of the year in the HP Open, where she lost to Tamarine Tanasugarn 7–5 6–7(4) 6–1, in one of the WTA's most historic finals. After much hype, the alternate wild card was given to Date-Krumm as a replacement for Ivanovic's wild card entry.

== Head to head ==
| | Li | Rezaï | Pavlyuchenkova | Wickmayer | Ivanovic | Kleybanova | Hantuchová | Date-Krumm | Overall | YTD W-L |
|---|---|---|---|---|---|---|---|---|---|---|
| (China) Li Na | | 2–0 | 0–1 | 0–1 | 1–0 | 1–0 | 2–2 | 0–0 | 6–4 | 36–19 |
| (France) Aravane Rezaï | 0–2 | | 1–2 | 0–1 | 0–2 | 2–4 | 0–1 | 0–0 | 3–12 | 36–24 |
| (Russia) Anastasia Pavlyuchenkova | 1–0 | 2–1 | | 1–0 | 0–2 | 1–1 | 4–1 | 0–1 | 9–6 | 40–21 |
| (Belgium) Yanina Wickmayer | 1–0 | 1–0 | 0–1 | | 0–0 | 1–1 | 0–4 | 2–0 | 5–6 | 43–20 |
| (Serbia) Ana Ivanovic | 0–1 | 2–0 | 2–0 | 0–0 | | 3–3 | 3–1 | 0–0 | 10–5 | 30–20 |
| (Russia) Alisa Kleybanova | 0–1 | 4–2 | 1–1 | 1–1 | 3–3 | | 1–1 | 0–1 | 10–10 | 31–23 |
| (Slovakia) Daniela Hantuchová | 2–2 | 1–0 | 1–4 | 4–0 | 1–3 | 1–1 | | 0–2 | 10–12 | 34–23 |
| (Japan) Kimiko Date-Krumm | 0–0 | 0–0 | 1–0 | 0–2 | 0–0 | 1–0 | 2–0 | | 4–2 | 25–18 |

== Points and prize money ==
The total prize money for the 2010 Commonwealth Bank Tournament of Champions is 600,000 United States dollars.

| Stage | Prize Money | Points |
|---|---|---|
| Champion | $210,000 | 375 |
| Finalist | $120,000 | 255 |
| Third place | $70,000 | 180 |
| Fourth place | $60,000* | 165 |
| Quarterfinalist | $35,000 | 75 |

- $50,000 in the event of default

== Draw ==
First round
1 | (China) Li Na | 4 | 6 | 4
WC | (Japan) Kimiko Date-Krumm | 6 | 3 | 6
3 | (Russia) Anastasia Pavlyuchenkova | 0 | 1
(Serbia) Ana Ivanovic | 6 | 6
WC | (Slovakia) Daniela Hantuchová | 6 | 7^{7}
4 | (Belgium) Yanina Wickmayer | 4 | 6^{5}
(Russia) Alisa Kleybanova | 6 | 6
2 | (France) Aravane Rezaï | 1 | 2

Semifinals
WC | (Japan) Kimiko Date-Krumm | 5 | 7^{7} | 2
(Serbia) Ana Ivanovic | 7 | 6^{5} | 6
WC | (Slovakia) Daniela Hantuchová | 3 | 1
(Russia) Alisa Kleybanova | 6 | 6

Final
(Serbia) Ana Ivanovic | 6 | 7^{7}
(Russia) Alisa Kleybanova | 2 | 6^{5}
Third place match
WC | (Japan) Kimiko Date-Krumm | 7 | 7
WC | (Slovakia) Daniela Hantuchová | 5 | 5

- Draw

== Day-to-day play ==
=== Day 1 (4 November) ===
Matches on Centre Court
| Round | Winner | Loser | Score |
|---|---|---|---|
| First round | (Serbia) Ana Ivanovic | (Russia) Anastasia Pavlyuchenkova [3] | 6–0, 6–1 |
| First round^{1} | (Japan) Kimiko Date-Krumm [WC] | (China) Li Na [1] | 6–4, 3–6, 6–4 |
1st match starts at 5:30 PM^{1} Not before 8:00 PM

=== Day 2 (5 November) ===
Matches on Centre Court
| Round | Winner | Loser | Score |
|---|---|---|---|
| First round | (Russia) Alisa Kleybanova | (France) Aravane Rezaï [2] | 6–1, 6–2 |
| First round^{1} | (Slovakia) Daniela Hantuchová [WC] | (Belgium) Yanina Wickmayer [4] | 6–4, 7–6(5) |
1st match starts at 5:30 PM^{1} Not before 8:00 PM

=== Day 3 (6 November) ===
Matches on Centre Court
| Round | Winner | Loser | Score |
|---|---|---|---|
| Semifinals | (Serbia) Ana Ivanovic | (Japan) Kimiko Date-Krumm [WC] | 7–5, 6–7(5), 6–2 |
| Semifinals^{1} | (Russia) Alisa Kleybanova | (Slovakia) Daniela Hantuchová [WC] | 6–3, 6–1 |
1st match starts at 2:00 PM^{1} Not before 4:00 PM

=== Day 4 (7 November) ===
Matches on Centre Court
| Round | Winner | Loser | Score |
|---|---|---|---|
| 3rd place Match | (Japan) Kimiko Date-Krumm [WC] | (Slovakia) Daniela Hantuchová [WC] | 7–5, 7–5 |
| Final^{1} | (Serbia) Ana Ivanovic | (Russia) Alisa Kleybanova | 6–2, 7–6(5) |
1st match starts at 2:00 PM^{1} Not before 4:00 PM

== See also ==
- Commonwealth Bank Tournament of Champions
- 2010 WTA Tour
