= 2009 Grand Prix SAR La Princesse Lalla Meryem =

- Date: 27 April – 2 May
- Edition: 9th
- Draw: 32S / 16D
- Prize money: $220,000
- Surface: Clay / outdoor
- Location: Fes, Morocco

Champions

Singles
- (Spain) Anabel Medina Garrigues

Doubles
- (Russia) Alisa Kleybanova / (Russia) Ekaterina Makarova
- Morocco Open

The 2009 Grand Prix SAR La Princesse Lalla Meryem was a women's tennis tournament played on outdoor clay courts. It was the 9th edition of the Grand Prix SAR La Princesse Lalla Meryem, and was part of the International category of the 2009 WTA Tour. It took place in Fes, Morocco, from 27 April through 2 May 2008. First-seeded Anabel Medina Garrigues won the singles title.

== Finals ==
=== Singles ===
(Spain) Anabel Medina Garrigues defeated (Russia) Ekaterina Makarova, 6–0, 6–1

- It was Medina Garrigues' only singles title of the year and 9th of her career.

=== Doubles ===
(Russia) Alisa Kleybanova / (Russia) Ekaterina Makarova defeated (Romania) Sorana Cîrstea / (Russia) Maria Kirilenko, 6–3, 2–6, 10–8

== Entrants ==
=== Seeds ===
Player	Nationality	Ranking*	Seeding
Anabel Medina Garrigues	Spain	18	1
Alisa Kleybanova	Russia	25	2
Anastasia Pavlyuchenkova	Russia	28	3
Maria Kirilenko	Russia	38	4
Sorana Cîrstea	Romania	41	5
Ekaterina Makarova	Russia	51	6
Roberta Vinci	Italy	52	7
Shahar Pe'er	Israel	53	8

- Rankings as of April 27, 2009.

=== Other entrants ===
The following players received wildcards into the main draw:

- (Spain) Anabel Medina Garrigues
- (Morocco) Nadia Lalami
- (Morocco) Fatima Zahrae El Allami

The following players received entry from the qualifying draw:

- (Spain) Paula Fondevila Castro
- (Italy) Corinna Dentoni
- (Slovenia) Polona Hercog
- (Italy) Nathalie Viérin

The following players received entry as a lucky loser:

- (Russia) Vitalia Diatchenko
- (Spain) Eva Fernández Brugués
