= Sabine Lisicki career statistics =

Career statistics of professional tennis player, Sabine Lisicki

Career finals
Discipline	Type	Won	Lost	Total
Singles	Grand Slam	-	1	1
Singles	Summer Olympics	-	-	-
Singles	WTA Finals	-	-	-
Singles	Premier Mandatory & 5*	-	-	-
Singles	Premier & WTA Tour	4	4	8
Singles	Total	4	5	9
Doubles	Grand Slam	-	1	1
Doubles	Summer Olympics	-	-	-
Doubles	WTA Finals	-	-	-
Doubles	Premier Mandatory & 5*	1	-	1
Doubles	Premier & WTA Tour	3	-	3
Doubles	Total	4	1	5
Total		8	6	14
1) * formerly known as "Tier I" tournaments.

This is a list of the main career statistics of professional German tennis player, Sabine Lisicki. Highlights of Lisicki's career include winning four WTA Tour singles titles and a finals appearance at the 2013 Wimbledon Championships. She was also a semifinalist at the event in 2011, and a quarterfinalist on three other occasions. Lisicki has also won three Tour doubles titles and reached the final of the 2011 Wimbledon Championships in women's doubles with Samantha Stosur as her partner.

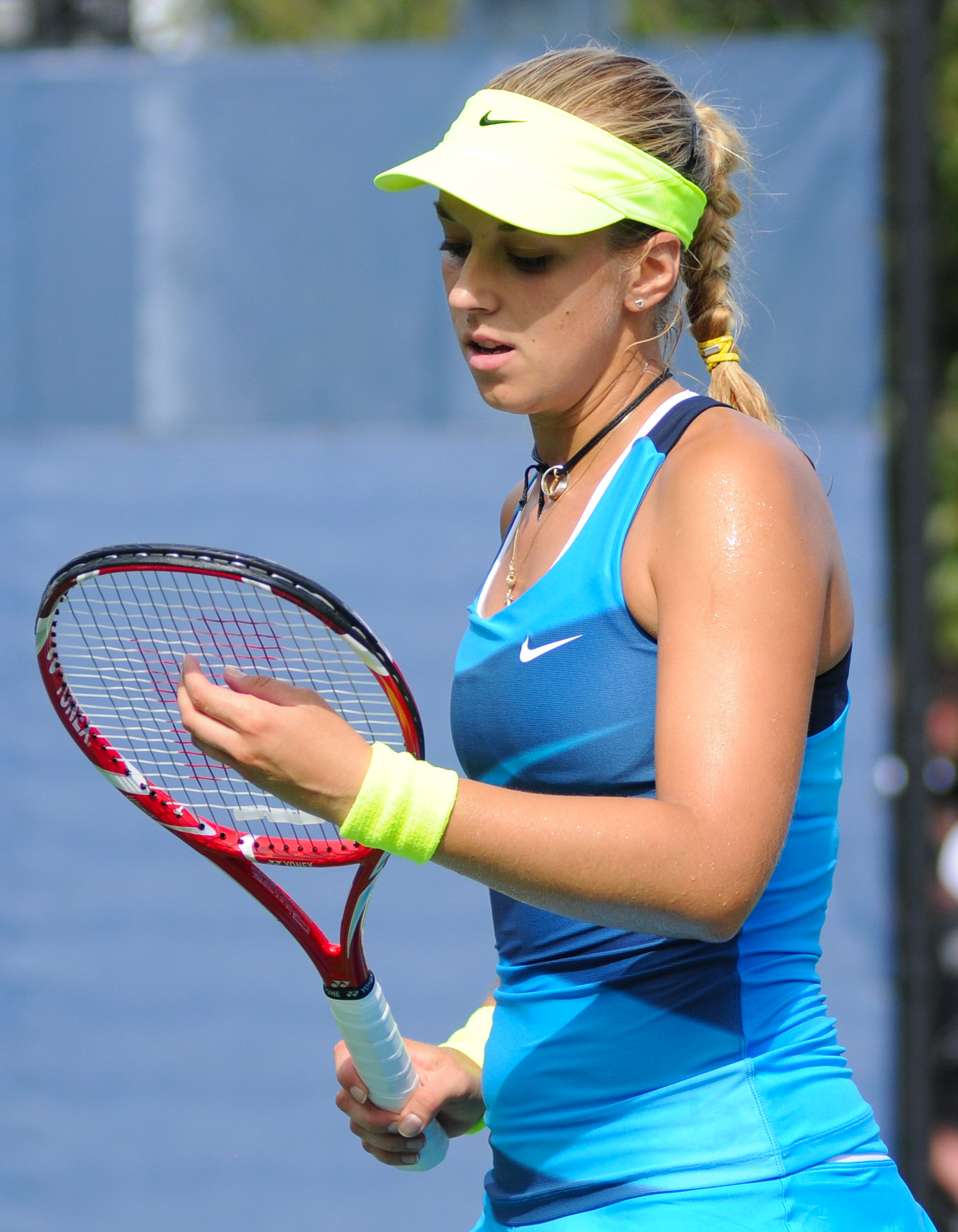
German professional tennis player Sabine Lisicki

== Performance timelines ==
Key
W	F	SF	QF	#R	RR	Q#	P#	DNQ	A	Z#	PO	G	S	B	NMS	NTI	P	NH

(W) winner; (F) finalist; (SF) semifinalist; (QF) quarterfinalist; (#R) rounds 4, 3, 2, 1; (RR) round-robin stage; (Q#) qualification round; (P#) preliminary round; (DNQ) did not qualify; (A) absent; (Z#) Davis/Fed Cup Zonal Group (with number indication) or (PO) play-off; (G) gold, (S) silver or (B) bronze Olympic/Paralympic medal; (NMS) not a Masters tournament; (NTI) not a Tier I tournament; (P) postponed; (NH) not held; (SR) strike rate (events won / competed); (W–L) win–loss record.
To avoid confusion and double counting, these charts are updated at the conclusion of a tournament or when the player's participation has ended.

Only WTA Tour and Grand Slam tournaments main draw, Billie Jean King Cup and Olympics matches are considered in win–loss records.

=== Singles ===
Tournament	2005	2006	2007	2008	2009	2010	2011	2012	2013	2014	2015	2016	2017	2018	2019	2020	2021	2022	2023	SR	W–L	Win %
Grand Slam tournaments
Australian Open	A	A	A	3R	2R	2R	Q2	4R	1R	2R	1R	2R	A	A	Q1	A	A	A	A	0 / 8	9–8	53%
French Open	A	A	A	2R	1R	A	2R	1R	3R	2R	3R	1R	A	A	A	A	A	A	A	0 / 8	7–8	47%
Wimbledon	A	A	A	1R	QF	A	SF	QF	F	QF	3R	3R	1R	Q1	Q3	NH	A	A	A	0 / 9	27–9	75%
US Open	A	A	A	2R	2R	2R	4R	1R	3R	3R	4R	1R	1R	Q1	A	A	A	A	A	0 / 10	12–10	55%
Win–loss	0–0	0–0	0–0	4–4	6–4	2–2	8–3	7–4	10–4	8–4	7–4	3–4	0–2	0–0	0–0	0–0	0–0	0–0	0–0	0 / 35	55–35	61%
National representation
Olympic Games	not held			A	not held			3R	not held			A	not held				A	not held		0 / 1	2–1	67%
BJK Cup	A	A	A	1R	PO	A	PO	1R	PO	F	SF	A	A	A	A	A	A	A	A	0 / 4	5–6	45%
WTA 1000 tournaments + former Tier I tournaments
Dubai / Qatar Open	NP5			1R	A	2R	A	1R	A	A	2R	1R	A	Q1	Q1	A	A	A	A	0 / 5	2–5	29%
Indian Wells Open	A	A	A	1R	1R	2R	Q1	2R	A	2R	SF	2R	A	Q1	A	NH	A	A	A	0 / 7	4–7	36%
Miami Open	A	Q1	A	4R	2R	2R	3R	4R	1R	3R	QF	2R	A	Q1	A	NH	A	A	A	0 / 9	12–8	60%
Madrid Open	not held				A	A	A	A	3R	3R	1R	2R	A	A	A	NH	A	A	A	0 / 4	5–4	56%
Italian Open	A	A	A	A	A	A	A	1R	2R	1R	2R	1R	A	A	A	A	A	A	A	0 / 5	2–5	29%
Canadian Open	A	A	A	1R	A	A	A	2R	A	3R	3R	Q2	A	A	A	NH	A	A	A	0 / 4	4–4	50%
Cincinnati Open	not Premier 5				A	1R	1R	A	1R	3R	1R	Q2	A	Q1	A	A	A	A	A	0 / 5	2–5	29%
Tokyo / Wuhan Open	A	A	A	A	2R	A	A	1R	A	2R	A	1R	A	Q1	A	not held				0 / 4	2–4	33%
China Open	not Prem Man				1R	A	2R	2R	3R	3R	A	2R	A	A	A	not held			A	0 / 6	7–5	58%
German Open	Q2	1R	1R	2R	not held / not WTA 1000															0 / 3	1–3	25%
Win–loss	0–0	0–1	0–1	4–5	2–4	1–4	3–2	3–7	5–5	10–7	11–7	2–7	0–0	0–0	0–0	0–0	0–0	0–0	0–0	0 / 52	41–50	45%
Career statistics
	2005	2006	2007	2008	2009	2010	2011	2012	2013	2014	2015	2016	2017	2018	2019	2020	2021	2022	2023	SR	W–L	Win %
Tournaments	0	1	1	18	18	9	15	19	19	22	19	21	5	4	4	0	0	2	3	Career total: 180		
Titles	0	0	0	0	1	0	2	0	0	1	0	0	0	0	0	0	0	0	0	Career total: 4		
Finals	0	0	0	1	2	0	2	0	3	1	0	0	0	0	0	0	0	0	0	Career total: 9		
Hard win–loss	0–0	0–0	0–0	15–13	16–12	4–8	18–8	9–14	18–10	19–12	13–12	9–13	3–3	5–4	0–1	0–0	0–0	0–0	0–0	2 / 113	129–110	54%
Clay win–loss	0–0	0–1	0–1	2–4	11–4	0–0	6–3	2–4	9–6	4–5	4–6	3–6	0–0	0–0	0–3	0–0	0–0	0–1	0–1	1 / 44	41–45	48%
Grass win–loss	0–0	0–0	0–0	0–2	4–2	0–0	11–1	6–3	8–2	4–1	5–2	3–2	2–2	0–0	0–0	0–0	0–0	2–1	0–2	1 / 21	45–20	69%
Carpet win–loss	0–0	0–0	0–0	0–1	0–0	0–1	0–0	0–0	0–0	0–0	0–0	0–0	0–0	0–0	discontinued					0 / 2	0–2	0%
Overall win–loss	0–0	0–1	0–1	17–20	31–18	4–9	35–12	17–21	35–18	27–18	22–20	15–21	5–5	5–4	0–4	0–0	0–0	2–2	0–3	4 / 180	215–177	55%
Win %	–	0%	0%	46%	63%	31%	74%	45%	66%	60%	52%	42%	50%	56%	0%	–	–	50%	0%	Career total: 55%		
Year-end ranking	437	497	237	54	23	179	15	37	15	27	32	91	268	229	335	622	–	427	376			

=== Doubles ===
Tournament	2006	2007	2008	2009	2010	2011	2012	2013	2014	2015	2016	2017	2018	2019	2020	2021	2022	2023	SR	W–L
Grand Slam tournaments
Australian Open	A	A	A	A	1R	A	A	A	A	A	2R	A	A	A	A	A	A	A	0 / 2	1–2
French Open	A	A	1R	A	A	A	A	3R	A	1R	2R	A	A	A	A	A	A	A	0 / 4	3–4
Wimbledon	A	A	A	2R	A	F	3R	A	A	A	1R	A	A	A	NH	A	A	A	0 / 4	8–3
US Open	A	A	2R	A	A	1R	QF	A	A	1R	3R	2R	A	A	A	A	A	A	0 / 6	7–6
Win–loss	0–0	0–0	1–2	1–1	0–1	5–2	5–1	2–1	0–0	0–2	4–4	1–1	0–0	0–0	0–0	0–0	0–0	0–0	0 / 16	19–15
National representation
Olympic Games	not held		A	not held			2R	not held			A	not held				A	not held		0 / 1	1–1
BJK Cup	A	A	1R	PO	A	PO	1R	PO	F	SF	A	A	A	A	A	A	A	A	0 / 4	5–1
WTA 1000 + former Tier I tournaments
Dubai / Qatar Open	NP5		A	A	A	A	QF	A	A	1R	A	A	A	A	A	A	A	A	0 / 2	1–2
Indian Wells Open	A	A	A	A	A	A	2R	A	1R	QF	A	A	A	A	NH	A	A	A	0 / 3	3–3
Miami Open	A	A	A	A	A	A	A	2R	W	A	A	A	A	A	NH	A	A	A	1 / 2	6–1
Madrid Open	not held			A	A	A	A	QF	2R	A	A	A	A	A	NH	A	A	A	0 / 2	3–2
Italian Open	A	A	A	A	A	A	1R	A	1R	1R	A	A	A	A	A	A	A	A	0 / 3	0–3
Canadian Open	A	A	QF	A	A	A	QF	A	A	A	A	A	A	A	NH	A	A	A	0 / 2	4–2
Cincinnati Open	NP5			A	A	1R	A	A	A	A	A	A	A	A	A	A	A	A	0 / 1	0–1
Tokyo / Wuhan Open	A	A	A	A	A	A	SF	A	A	A	A	A	A	A	not held				0 / 1	2–1
China Open	NPM			A	A	A	A	2R	A	A	A	A	A	A	not held			A	0 / 1	1–1
German Open	Q1	A	2R	not held / not WTA 1000															0 / 1	1–1
Win–loss	0–0	0–0	3–2	0–0	0–0	0–1	6–5	4–3	6–3	2–3	0–0	0–0	0–0	0–0	0–0	0–0	0–0	0–0	1 / 18	21–17
Career statistics
	2006	2007	2008	2009	2010	2011	2012	2013	2014	2015	2016	2017	2018	2019	2020	2021	2022	2023	Career	
Tournaments	0	0	6	2	1	5	10	5	5	8	6	3	0	1	1	0	1	1	55	
Titles	0	0	0	0	0	1	0	1	1	1	0	0	0	0	0	0	0	0	4	
Finals	0	0	0	0	0	2	0	1	1	1	0	0	0	0	0	0	0	0	5	
Overall win–loss	0–0	0–0	5–6	2–2	0–1	9–4	13–8	11–4	7–4	9–8	6–6	1–3	0–0	0–1	0–1	0–0	2–1	1–1	66–50	
Year-end ranking	–	474	145	–	–	45	55	71	72	84	104	397	–	–	–	–	380	579	57%	

=== Mixed doubles ===
Tournament	2012	2013	2014	2015	2016	2017	SR	W–L
Grand Slam tournaments
Australian Open	A	1R	A	A	A	A	0 / 1	0–1
French Open	A	A	A	A	A	A	0 / 0	0–0
Wimbledon	A	2R	A	A	A	3R	0 / 2	3–1
US Open	A	A	A	A	A	A	0 / 0	0–0
Win–loss	0–0	1–1	0–0	0–0	0–0	2–1	0 / 3	3–2
National representation
Olympic Games	4th	not held			A	NH	0 / 1	2–2

== Grand Slam finals ==
=== Singles: 1 (1 runner-up) ===
Result	Year	Championship	Surface	Opponent	Score
Loss	2013	Wimbledon	Grass	(France) Marion Bartoli	1–6, 4–6

=== Doubles: 1 (1 runner-up) ===
Result	Year	Championship	Surface	Opponents	Opponents	Score
Loss	2011	Wimbledon	Grass	(Australia) Samantha Stosur	(Czech Republic) Květa Peschke (Slovenia) Katarina Srebotnik	3–6, 1–6

== Other significant finals ==
=== Premier Mandatory tournaments ===
==== Doubles: 1 (1 title) ====
Result	Year	Tournament	Surface	Partner	Opponents	Score
Win	2014	Miami Open	Hard	(Switzerland) Martina Hingis	(Russia) Ekaterina Makarova (Russia) Elena Vesnina	4–6, 6–4, [10–5]

=== Olympic medal matches ===
==== Mixed doubles (1 bronze medal match) ====
Result	Year	Tournament	Surface	Partner	Opponents	Score
4th place	2012	London Olympics	Grass	(Germany) Christopher Kas	(United States) Lisa Raymond (United States) Mike Bryan	3–6, 6–4, [4–10]

== WTA Tour finals ==
=== Singles: 9 (4 titles, 5 runner-ups) ===
Legend Grand Slam tournaments (0–1) Tier I / Premier M & Premier 5 (0–0) Tier II / Premier (1–0) Tier III, IV & V / International (3–4)	Finals by surface Hard (2–4) Grass (1–1) Clay (1–0) Carpet (0–0)

Result	W–L	Date	Tournament	Tier	Surface	Opponent	Score
Loss	0–1	Oct 2008	Tashkent Open, Uzbekistan	Tier IV	Hard	(Romania) Sorana Cîrstea	6–2, 4–6, 6–7^{(4–7)}
Win	1–1	Apr 2009	Charleston Open, United States	Premier	Clay	(Denmark) Caroline Wozniacki	6–2, 6–4
Loss	1–2	Oct 2009	Luxembourg Open, Luxembourg	International	Hard (i)	(Switzerland) Timea Bacsinszky	2–6, 5–7
Win	2–2	Jun 2011	Birmingham Classic, United Kingdom	International	Grass	(Slovakia) Daniela Hantuchová	6–3, 6–2
Win	3–2	Aug 2011	Texas Open, United States	International	Hard	(France) Aravane Rezaï	6–2, 6–1
Loss	3–3	Feb 2013	Thailand Open, Thailand	International	Hard	(Russia) Maria Kirilenko	7–5, 1–6, 6–7^{(1–7)}
Loss	3–4	Feb 2013	U.S. National Indoors, United States	International	Hard (i)	(New Zealand) Marina Erakovic	1–6, ret.
Loss	3–5	Jul 2013	Wimbledon, United Kingdom	Grand Slam	Grass	(France) Marion Bartoli	1–6, 4–6
Win	4–5	Sep 2014	Hong Kong Open, China SAR	International	Hard	(Czech Republic) Karolína Plíšková	7–5, 6–3

=== Doubles: 5 (4 titles, 1 runner-up) ===
Legend Grand Slam tournaments (0–1) Premier M & Premier 5 (1–0) Premier (3–0) International (0–0)	Finals by surface Hard (2–0) Grass (0–1) Clay (2–0) Carpet (0–0)

Result	W–L	Date	Tournament	Tier	Surface	Partner	Opponents	Score
Win	1–0	Apr 2011	Stuttgart Open, Germany	Premier	Clay (i)	(Australia) Samantha Stosur	(Germany) Jasmin Wöhr (Germany) Kristina Barrois	6–1, 7–6^{(7–5)}
Loss	1–1	Jul 2011	Wimbledon, United Kingdom	Grand Slam	Grass	(Australia) Samantha Stosur	(Czech Republic) Květa Peschke (Slovenia) Katarina Srebotnik	3–6, 1–6
Win	2–1	Apr 2013	Stuttgart Open, Germany (2)	Premier	Clay (i)	(Germany) Mona Barthel	(United States) Bethanie Mattek-Sands (India) Sania Mirza	6–4, 7–5
Win	3–1	Mar 2014	Miami Open, United States	Premier M	Hard	(Switzerland) Martina Hingis	(Russia) Ekaterina Makarova (Russia) Elena Vesnina	4–6, 6–4, [10–5]
Win	4–1	Jan 2015	Brisbane International, Australia	Premier	Hard	(Switzerland) Martina Hingis	(France) Caroline Garcia (Slovenia) Katarina Srebotnik	6–2, 7–5

== WTA Challenger finals ==
=== Singles: 1 (runner-up) ===
Result	W–L	Date	Tournament	Surface	Opponent	Score
Loss	0–1	Nov 2018	Taipei Open, Taiwan	Carpet (i)	(Thailand) Luksika Kumkhum	1–6, 3–6

== ITF Circuit finals ==
=== Singles: 5 (3 titles, 2 runner-ups) ===
Legend
$50/60,000 tournaments (1–1)
$25,000 tournaments (2–1)

Result	W–L	Date	Tournament	Tier	Surface	Opponent	Score
Loss	0–1	Feb 2007	Challenger de Saguenay, Canada	50,000	Hard (i)	(Germany) Angelique Kerber	3–6, 4–6
Loss	0–2	Sep 2007	ITF Madrid, Spain	25,000	Hard	(Spain) María José Martínez Sánchez	2–6, 6–3, 3–6
Win	1–2	Oct 2007	ITF Jersey, United Kingdom	25,000	Hard (i)	(Croatia) Petra Martić	6–3, 6–4
Win	2–2	Nov 2007	Toronto Challenger, Canada	25,000	Hard (i)	(Argentina) María José Argeri	6–4, 6–4
Win	3–2	Nov 2023	Calgary Challenger, Canada	60,000	Hard (i)	(Canada) Stacey Fung	7–6^{(7–2)}, 6–7^{(5–7)}, 6–3

=== Doubles: 2 (2 runner-ups) ===
$25,000 tournaments (0–1)
$10,000 tournaments (0–1)

Result	W–L	Date	Tournament	Tier	Surface	Partner	Opponents	Score
Loss	0–1	Sep 2004	ITF Mollerusa, Spain	10,000	Hard	(France) Nelly Maillard	(Denmark) Karina Jacobsgaard (France) Emilie Trouche	w/o
Loss	0–2	Oct 2006	Open Nantes, France	25,000	Hard (i)	(France) Irena Pavlovic	(United Kingdom) Rebecca Llewellyn (United Kingdom) Melanie South	2–6, 0–6

== Best Grand Slam results details ==
	Australian Open	
2012 Australian Open (14th seed)
Round	Opponent	Score
1R	(Switzerland) Stefanie Vögele (Q)	6–2, 4–6, 6–4
2R	(Israel) Shahar Pe'er	6–1, 6–2
3R	(Russia) Svetlana Kuznetsova (18)	2–6, 6–4, 6–2
4R	(Russia) Maria Sharapova (4)	6–3, 2–6, 3–6

	French Open	
2013 French Open (32nd seed)
Round	Opponent	Score
1R	(Sweden) Sofia Arvidsson	6–3, 6–4
2R	(Spain) María Teresa Torró Flor	6–4, 6–0
3R	(Italy) Sara Errani (5)	0–6, 4–6
2015 French Open (20th seed)
Round	Opponent	Score
1R	(Puerto Rico) Monica Puig	6–3, 6–2
2R	(Australia) Daria Saville	6–1, ret.
3R	(Czech Republic) Lucie Šafářová (13)	3–6, 6–7^{(2–7)}

	Wimbledon Championships	
2013 Wimbledon (23rd seed)
Round	Opponent	Score
1R	(Italy) Francesca Schiavone	6–1, 6–2
2R	(Russia) Elena Vesnina	6–3, 6–1
3R	(Australia) Samantha Stosur (14)	4–6, 6–2, 6–1
4R	(United States) Serena Williams (1)	6–2, 1–6, 6–4
QF	(Estonia) Kaia Kanepi	6–3, 6–3
SF	(Poland) Agnieszka Radwańska (4)	6–4, 2–6, 9–7
F	(France) Marion Bartoli (15)	1–6, 4–6

	US Open	
2011 US Open (22nd seed)
Round	Opponent	Score
1R	(Ukraine) Alona Bondarenko (PR)	6–3, 6–3
2R	(United States) Venus Williams	walkover
3R	(United States) Irina Falconi	6–0, 6–1
4R	(Russia) Vera Zvonareva (2)	2–6, 3–6
2015 US Open (24th seed)
Round	Opponent	Score
1R	(Belarus) Aliaksandra Sasnovich (Q)	6–1, 6–4
2R	(Italy) Camila Giorgi	6–4, 6–0
3R	(Czech Republic) Barbora Strýcová	6–4, 4–6, 7–5
4R	(Romania) Simona Halep (2)	7–6^{(8–6)}, 5–7, 2–6

== National participation ==
=== Team competition finals ===
Result	Year	Tournament	Surface	Partners	Opponents	Score
Loss	2014	Fed Cup, Prague, Czech Republic	Hard (i)	(Germany) Angelique Kerber (Germany) Andrea Petkovic (Germany) Julia Görges	(Czech Republic) Petra Kvitová (Czech Republic) Lucie Šafářová (Czech Republic) Lucie Hradecká (Czech Republic) Andrea Hlaváčková	1–3

=== Fed Cup ===
Lisicki has a 10–7 record in the Fed Cup (now called Billie Jean King Cup).

Group membership World Group (3–5) WG Play-offs (5–1) World Group II (2–1)	Matches by type Singles (5–6) Doubles (5–1)

Date	Venue	Surface	Rd	Opponent nation	Score	Match type	Opponent player(s)	W/L	Match score
2008
Feb 2008	La Jolla	Hard	QF	United States	1–4	Singles	Lindsay Davenport	Win	6–1, 7–5
Feb 2008	La Jolla	Hard	QF	United States	1–4	Singles	Ashley Harkleroad	Loss	4–6, 5–7
Apr 2008	Buenos Aires	Clay	PO	Argentina	2–3	Singles	Gisela Dulko	Loss	2–6, 2–6
Apr 2008	Buenos Aires	Clay	PO	Argentina	2–3	Doubles (w/ J Wöhr)	B Jozami / J Cravero	Win	6–0, 1–6, 7–6^{(7–2)}
2009
Feb 2009	Zürich	Hard (i)	WG2	Switzerland	3–2	Singles	Timea Bacsinszky	Win	6–0, 6–4
Feb 2009	Zürich	Hard (i)	WG2	Switzerland	3–2	Singles	Patty Schnyder	Loss	7–6^{(7–4)}, 5–7, 1–6
Apr 2009	Frankfurt	Clay	PO	China	3–2	Singles	Zheng Jie	Win	6–4, 2–6, 6–4
Apr 2009	Frankfurt	Clay	PO	China	3–2	Doubles (w/ A-L Grönefeld)	J Zheng / S Peng	Win	4–6, 7–5, 6–2
2011
Apr 2011	Stuttgart	Clay (i)	PO	United States	5–0	Singles	Christina McHale	Win	6–3, 6–4
2012
Feb 2012	Stuttgart	Clay (i)	QF	Czech Republic	1–4	Singles	Iveta Benešová	Loss	6–2, 4–6, 2–6
Feb 2012	Stuttgart	Clay (i)	QF	Czech Republic	1–4	Singles	Petra Kvitová	Loss	7–6^{(7–2)}, 4–6, 1–6
2013
Feb 2013	Limoges	Clay (i)	WG2	France	3–1	Singles	Pauline Parmentier	Win	7–5, 7–5
Apr 2013	Stuttgart	Clay (i)	PO	Serbia	3–2	Doubles (w/ A-L Grönefeld)	A Krunić / V Dolonc	Win	6–2, 6–4
2014
Nov 2014	Prague	Hard (i)	F	Czech Republic	1–3	Doubles (w/ J Görges)	A Hlaváčková / L Hradecká	Win	6–4, 6–3
2015
Feb 2015	Stuttgart	Hard (i)	QF	Australia	4–1	Doubles (w/ J Görges)	C Dellacqua / O Rogowska	Win	6–7^{(2–7)}, 7–6^{(9–7)}, [10–6]
Apr 2015	Sochi	Clay (i)	SF	Russia	2–3	Singles	Anastasia Pavlyuchenkova	Loss	6–4, 6–7^{(4–7)}, 3–6
Apr 2015	Sochi	Clay (i)	SF	Russia	2–3	Doubles (w/ A Petkovic)	A Pavlyuchenkova / E Vesnina	Loss	2–6, 3–6

== Wins over top-10 players ==
Lisicki has a 13–38 record against players who were, at the time the match was played, ranked in the top 10.

Season	2006	2007	2008	2009	2010	2011	2012	2013	2014	2015	2016	2017	2018	2019	2020	2021	2022	2023	2024	Total
Wins	0	0	1	3	0	4	1	2	1	1	0	0	0	0	0	0	0	0	0	13

#	Player	Rank	Event	Surface	Round	Score	Rank
2008
1.	(Russia) Anna Chakvetadze	No. 6	Miami Open, United States	Hard	3R	7–5, 6–1	No. 137
2009
2.	(United States) Venus Williams	No. 5	Charleston Open, United States	Clay	3R	6–4, 7–6^{(7–5)}	No. 63
3.	(Russia) Svetlana Kuznetsova	No. 5	Wimbledon, United Kingdom	Grass	3R	6–2, 7–5	No. 41
4.	(Denmark) Caroline Wozniacki	No. 9	Wimbledon, United Kingdom	Grass	4R	6–4, 6–4	No. 41
2011
5.	(China) Li Na	No. 6	Stuttgart Open, Germany	Clay (i)	2R	6–4, 7–5	No. 155
6.	(China) Li Na	No. 4	Wimbledon, United Kingdom	Grass	2R	3–6, 6–4, 8–6	No. 62
7.	(France) Marion Bartoli	No. 9	Wimbledon, United Kingdom	Grass	QF	6–4, 6–7^{(7–9)}, 6–1	No. 62
8.	(Australia) Samantha Stosur	No. 10	Silicon Valley Classic, United States	Hard	2R	6–3, 7–5	No. 26
2012
9.	(Russia) Maria Sharapova	No. 1	Wimbledon, United Kingdom	Grass	4R	6–4, 6–3	No. 15
2013
10.	(United States) Serena Williams	No. 1	Wimbledon, United Kingdom	Grass	4R	6–2, 1–6, 6–4	No. 24
11.	(Poland) Agnieszka Radwańska	No. 4	Wimbledon, United Kingdom	Grass	SF	6–4, 2–6, 9–7	No. 24
2014
12.	(Canada) Eugenie Bouchard	No. 7	China Open, Beijing	Hard	2R	6–2, 6–4	No. 25
2015
13.	(Serbia) Ana Ivanovic	No. 6	Miami Open, United States	Hard	3R	7–6^{(7–4)}, 7–5	No. 27

== WTA Tour career earnings ==
As of 16 August 2024.

Year	Earnings
2004	$1,016
2005	$6,370
2006	$9,741
2007	$24,458
2008	$231,564
2009	$591,638
2010	$111,897
2011	$967,634
2012	$620,670
2013	$1,748,833
2014	$1,034,396
2015	$1,005,884
2016	$485,454
2017	$133,045
2018	$63,545
2019	$57,778
2020	$36,445
2021	$0
2022	$28,142
2023	$43,919
2024	$0
Career	$7,202,429
