= 2012 Texas Tennis Open – Singles =

Singles
- 2012 Texas Tennis Open

Final
- Champion: (Italy) Roberta Vinci
- Runner-up: (Serbia) Jelena Janković
- Score: 7–5, 6–3

Events
Singles	Doubles
← 2011 ·	Texas Tennis Open

Sabine Lisicki was the defending champion, but withdrew because of a left abdominal sprain. Roberta Vinci defeated Jelena Janković 7–5, 6–3 in the final to win the tournament.

== Seeds ==
1. (Germany) Angelique Kerber (withdrew because of a left shoulder injury)
2. (Serbia) Jelena Janković (final)
3. (Italy) Roberta Vinci (champion)
4. (Belgium) Yanina Wickmayer (second round)
5. (Czech Republic) Klára Zakopalová (first round)
6. (China) Peng Shuai (quarterfinals, retired because of a right shoulder injury)
7. (South Africa) Chanelle Scheepers (quarterfinals)
8. (Romania) Sorana Cîrstea (quarterfinals)

== Draw ==
=== Key ===
- Q = Qualifier
- WC = Wild card
- LL = Lucky loser
- Alt = Alternate
- SE = Special exempt
- PR = Protected ranking
- ITF = ITF entry
- JE = Junior exempt
- w/o = Walkover
- r = Retired
- d = Defaulted
- SR = Special ranking

=== Finals ===
Semifinals
WC	(Serbia) Bojana Jovanovski	0	0
3	(Italy) Roberta Vinci	6	6
Q	(Australia) Casey Dellacqua	5	4
2	(Serbia) Jelena Janković	7	6

Final
3	(Italy) Roberta Vinci	7	6
2	(Serbia) Jelena Janković	5	3

=== Top half ===
First round
LL	(United Kingdom) E Webley-Smith	1	2
Q	(Croatia) M Lučić	6	6
(Russia) A Panova	6	1	1
WC	(Serbia) B Jovanovski	4	6	6
(United States) I Falconi	1	4
Q	(France) P Parmentier	6	6
(Japan) A Morita	6	0	3
6	(China) S Peng	4	6	6
3	(Italy) R Vinci	6	6
(Chinese Taipei) S-w Hsieh	2	2
(Slovenia) P Hercog	6	0
(Netherlands) K Bertens	4	0^{r}
(New Zealand) M Erakovic	6	5	7^{11}
(United Kingdom) A Keothavong	1	7	6^{9}
(Czech Republic) B Záhlavová-Strýcová	0	2
7	(South Africa) C Scheepers	6	6

Second round
Q	(Croatia) M Lučić	6^{5}	2
WC	(Serbia) B Jovanovski	7^{7}	6
Q	(France) P Parmentier	4	2
6	(China) S Peng	6	6
3	(Italy) R Vinci	6	6
(Slovenia) P Hercog	2	3
(New Zealand) M Erakovic	4	6^{3}
7	(South Africa) C Scheepers	6	7^{7}

Quarterfinals
WC	(Serbia) B Jovanovski	6	1
6	(China) S Peng	4	0^{r}
3	(Italy) R Vinci	7^{7}	6
7	(South Africa) C Scheepers	6^{1}	2

Semifinals
WC	(Serbia) B Jovanovski	0	0
3	(Italy) R Vinci	6	6

=== Bottom half ===
First round
5	(Czech Republic) K Zakopalová	0	6^{2}
(Canada) A Wozniak	6	7^{7}
(Kazakhstan) G Voskoboeva	4	3
Q	(Canada) E Bouchard	6	6
Q	(Australia) C Dellacqua	6	6
(Romania) I-C Begu	2	2
(United Kingdom) H Watson	3	4
4/WC	(Belgium) Y Wickmayer	6	6
8	(Romania) S Cîrstea	7^{7}	6
WC	(Australia) J Gajdošová	6^{2}	4
(Czech Republic) I Benešová	6	6^{3}	2
(France) A Cornet	1	7^{7}	6
(Switzerland) R Oprandi	5	4
(Netherlands) A Rus	7	6
(Kazakhstan) Y Shvedova	7^{9}	6^{4}	1
2	(Serbia) J Janković	6^{7}	7^{7}	6

Second round
(Canada) A Wozniak	6	6
Q	(Canada) E Bouchard	2	2
Q	(Australia) C Dellacqua	6	6
4/WC	(Belgium) Y Wickmayer	4	3
8	(Romania) S Cîrstea	6	7
(France) A Cornet	1	5
(Netherlands) A Rus	6^{5}	2
2	(Serbia) J Janković	7^{7}	6

Quarterfinals
(Canada) A Wozniak	4	4
Q	(Australia) C Dellacqua	6	6
8	(Romania) S Cîrstea	2	1
2	(Serbia) J Janković	6	6

Semifinals
Q	(Australia) C Dellacqua	5	4
2	(Serbia) J Janković	7	6

== Qualifying draw ==
=== Seeds ===
1. (Hungary) Melinda Czink (qualifying competition)
2. (France) Pauline Parmentier (qualified)
3. (Croatia) Mirjana Lučić (qualified)
4. (Australia) Casey Dellacqua (qualified)
5. (Canada) Eugenie Bouchard (qualified)
6. (United States) Jennifer Elie (first round)
7. (Canada) Gabriela Dabrowski (qualifying competition)
8. (United Kingdom) Emily Webley-Smith (qualifying competition, lucky loser)

=== Qualifiers ===
1. (Canada) Eugenie Bouchard
2. (France) Pauline Parmentier
3. (Croatia) Mirjana Lučić
4. (Australia) Casey Dellacqua

=== Lucky loser ===
1. (United Kingdom) Emily Webley-Smith

==== First qualifier ====
First round
1	(Hungary) Melinda Czink	6	2	6
(United States) Asia Muhammad	4	6	1
(United States) Nicole Melichar	1	2
5	(Canada) Eugenie Bouchard	6	6

Qualifying competition
1	(Hungary) Melinda Czink	4	2
5	(Canada) Eugenie Bouchard	6	6

==== Second qualifier ====
First round
2	(France) Pauline Parmentier	6	6
WC	(United States) Emily Harman	4	2
(Russia) Angelina Gabueva	3	2
7	(Canada) Gabriela Dabrowski	6	6

Qualifying competition
2	(France) Pauline Parmentier	7	6
7	(Canada) Gabriela Dabrowski	5	4

==== Third qualifier ====
First round
3	(Croatia) Mirjana Lučić	6	6
WC	(United States) Roxanne Ellison	1	2
(United States) Elizabeth Lumpkin	3	6	6
6	(United States) Jennifer Elie	6	2	3

Qualifying competition
3	(Croatia) Mirjana Lučić	6	6
(United States) Elizabeth Lumpkin	1	4

==== Fourth qualifier ====
First round
4	(Australia) Casey Dellacqua	6	7^{7}
(Croatia) Ivana Lisjak	2	6^{2}
(United States) Alexandra Stevenson	6^{4}	4
8	(United Kingdom) Emily Webley-Smith	7^{7}	6

Qualifying competition
4	(Australia) Casey Dellacqua	6	6
8	(United Kingdom) Emily Webley-Smith	2	1
