= 2012 Texas Tennis Open – Doubles =

Doubles
- 2012 Texas Tennis Open

Final
- Champions: (New Zealand) Marina Erakovic (United Kingdom) Heather Watson
- Runners-up: (Latvia) Līga Dekmeijere (United States) Irina Falconi
- Score: 6–3, 6–0

Events
Singles	Doubles
← 2011 ·	Texas Tennis Open

Alberta Brianti and Sorana Cîrstea were the defending champions, but both chose not to participate this year.
Marina Erakovic and Heather Watson won the title after defeating Līga Dekmeijere and Irina Falconi 6–3, 6–0 in the final.

== Seeds ==
1. (Czech Republic) Iveta Benešová / (Czech Republic) Barbora Záhlavová-Strýcová (semifinals)
2. (Romania) Irina-Camelia Begu / (France) Alizé Cornet (quarterfinals)
3. (Australia) Jarmila Gajdošová / (Czech Republic) Klára Zakopalová (quarterfinals)
4. (New Zealand) Marina Erakovic / (United Kingdom) Heather Watson (champions)

== Draw ==
=== Key ===
- Q = Qualifier
- WC = Wild card
- LL = Lucky loser
- Alt = Alternate
- SE = Special exempt
- PR = Protected ranking
- ITF = ITF entry
- JE = Junior exempt
- w/o = Walkover
- r = Retired
- d = Defaulted
- SR = Special ranking

=== Draw ===
First round
1	(Czech Republic) I Benešová (Czech Republic) B Záhlavová-Strýcová	6	6
WC	(United States) R Ellison (United States) S Ellison	2	4
(Canada) G Dabrowski (Chinese Taipei) S-w Hsieh	6	1	[10]
(United Kingdom) A Keothavong (France) P Parmentier	1	6	[7]
4	(New Zealand) M Erakovic (United Kingdom) H Watson	6	2	[10]
(United States) E Lumpkin (United States) Y Schnack	2	6	[8]
(United States) J Elie (United States) A Muhammed	7^{12}	6
(Australia) S Bengson (United Kingdom) E Webley-Smith	6^{10}	4
Alt	(Canada) E Bouchard (Canada) A Wozniak	6	7^{7}
(United States) A Bhargava (United States) S Krywacz	4	6^{2}
(Hungary) M Czink (Croatia) M Lučić	5	0
3	(Australia) J Gajdošová (Czech Republic) K Zakopalová	7	6
(Latvia) L Dekmeijere (United States) I Falconi	7^{7}	6
(Croatia) D Jurak (Hungary) K Marosi	6^{5}	2
WC	(United States) E Harman (United States) S Kalhorn	1	3
2	(Romania) I-C Begu (France) A Cornet	6	6

Quarterfinals
1	(Czech Republic) I Benešová (Czech Republic) B Záhlavová-Strýcová	6	6
(Canada) G Dabrowski (Chinese Taipei) S-w Hsieh	4	3
4	(New Zealand) M Erakovic (United Kingdom) H Watson	6	6
(United States) J Elie (United States) A Muhammed	2	0
Alt	(Canada) E Bouchard (Canada) A Wozniak	6	6
3	(Australia) J Gajdošová (Czech Republic) K Zakopalová	2	4
(Latvia) L Dekmeijere (United States) I Falconi	7^{7}	1	[10]
2	(Romania) I-C Begu (France) A Cornet	6^{4}	6	[8]

Semifinals
1	(Czech Republic) I Benešová (Czech Republic) B Záhlavová-Strýcová	7^{7}	4	[7]
4	(New Zealand) M Erakovic (United Kingdom) H Watson	6^{5}	6	[10]
Alt	(Canada) E Bouchard (Canada) A Wozniak	0	6	[8]
(Latvia) L Dekmeijere (United States) I Falconi	6	4	[10]

Final
4	(New Zealand) M Erakovic (United Kingdom) H Watson	6	6
(Latvia) L Dekmeijere (United States) I Falconi	3	0
