= 2011 Texas Tennis Open – Singles qualifying =

This article shows the qualifying draw for 2011 Texas Tennis Open.

== Seeds ==
1. (Ukraine) Kateryna Bondarenko (qualified)
2. (South Africa) Chanelle Scheepers (qualified)
3. (Germany) Angelique Kerber (qualified)
4. (France) Aravane Rezaï (qualified)
5. (Uzbekistan) Akgul Amanmuradova (qualifying competition) (Lucky loser)
6. (United States) Jamie Hampton (qualifying competition)
7. (Ukraine) Alona Bondarenko (qualifying competition)
8. (Slovenia) Andreja Klepač (first round)

== Qualifiers ==
1. (Ukraine) Kateryna Bondarenko
2. (South Africa) Chanelle Scheepers
3. (Germany) Angelique Kerber
4. (France) Aravane Rezaï

== Lucky losers ==
1. (Uzbekistan) Akgul Amanmuradova

== Qualifying draw ==
=== Key ===
- Q = Qualifier
- WC = Wild card
- LL = Lucky loser
- Alt = Alternate
- ITF = ITF entry
- PR = Protected ranking
- SR = Special ranking
- SE = Special exempt
- JE = Junior exempt
- JR = Junior Accelerator Programme entrant
- CO = College Accelerator Programme entrant
- NG = Next Gen Accelerator Program entrant
- w/o = Walkover
- r = Retired
- d = Defaulted

=== First qualifier ===
First round
1	(Ukraine) Kateryna Bondarenko	6	6
(Russia) Olga Puchkova	2	2
WC	(United States) Jennifer Elie	5	2
5	(Uzbekistan) Akgul Amanmuradova	7	6

Qualifying competition
1	(Ukraine) Kateryna Bondarenko	6	6
5	(Uzbekistan) Akgul Amanmuradova	4	3

=== Second qualifier ===
First round
2	(South Africa) Chanelle Scheepers	6	6
(Australia) Johanna Konta	2	3
WC	(United States) Elizabeth Lumpkin	3	3
6/WC	(United States) Jamie Hampton	6	6

Qualifying competition
2	(South Africa) Chanelle Scheepers	7	6
6/WC	(United States) Jamie Hampton	5	3

=== Third qualifier ===
First round
3	(Germany) Angelique Kerber	6	6
(Belarus) Tatiana Poutchek	0	3
(Australia) Casey Dellacqua	6	6
8	(Slovenia) Andreja Klepač	2	1

Qualifying competition
3	(Germany) Angelique Kerber	6	6
(Australia) Casey Dellacqua	2	1

=== Fourth qualifier ===
First round
4	(France) Aravane Rezaï	6	6
(Latvia) Līga Dekmeijere	4	0
WC	(United States) Simone Kalhorn	0	1
7	(Ukraine) Alona Bondarenko	6	6

Qualifying competition
4	(France) Aravane Rezaï	6	5	6
7	(Ukraine) Alona Bondarenko	4	7	4
