= 2009 Family Circle Cup =

- Date: April 13–19
- Edition: 37th
- Category: Premier
- Draw: 56S / 16D
- Prize money: $1,000,000
- Surface: Clay / outdoor
- Location: Charleston, South Carolina, U.S.
- Venue: Family Circle Tennis Center
- Attendance: 87,786

Champions

Singles
- (Germany) Sabine Lisicki

Doubles
- (United States) Bethanie Mattek-Sands (Russia) Nadia Petrova
- Family Circle Cup

The 2009 Family Circle Cup was a women's tennis event on the 2009 WTA Tour, which took place from April 13 to April 19, 2009. It was the 37th edition of the tournament and was hosted at the Family Circle Tennis Center, in Charleston, South Carolina, United States. It was the second and last event of the clay court season played on green clay courts. The total prize money offered at this tournament was US$1,000,000. Sabine Lisicki, who was seeded 16th, won the singles title.

== Finals ==
=== Singles ===
(Germany) Sabine Lisicki defeated (Denmark) Caroline Wozniacki, 6–2, 6–4

- It was Lisicki's only singles title of the year and the first of her career.

=== Doubles ===
(United States) Bethanie Mattek-Sands / (Russia) Nadia Petrova defeated (Latvia) Līga Dekmeijere / (Switzerland) Patty Schnyder, 6–7^{(5–7)}, 6–2, [11–9]

== Entrants ==
=== Seeds ===
Athlete	Nationality	Ranking*	Seeding
Elena Dementieva	Russia	3	1
Venus Williams	United States	5	2
Vera Zvonareva	Russia	6	3
Nadia Petrova	Russia	10	4
Caroline Wozniacki	Denmark	12	5
Marion Bartoli	France	13	6
Dominika Cibulková	Slovakia	19	7
Patty Schnyder	Switzerland	17	8
Aleksandra Wozniak	Canada	29	9
Peng Shuai	China	35	10
Alyona Bondarenko	Ukraine	41	11
Bethanie Mattek-Sands	United States	38	12
Virginie Razzano	France	42	13
Olga Govortsova	Belarus	59	14
Barbora Záhlavová-Strýcová	Czech Republic	68	15
Sabine Lisicki	Germany	63	16

- Rankings as of April 13, 2009.

=== Other entrants ===
The following players received wildcards into the main draw:

- (Russia) Elena Dementieva
- (United States) Mallory Cecil
- (Russia) Anastasia Pivovarova
- (United States) Alexandra Stevenson

The following players received entry from the qualifying draw:

- (United States) Shenay Perry
- (United States) Madison Brengle
- (United States) Angela Haynes
- (Latvia) Anastasija Sevastova
- (United States) Melanie Oudin
- (United States) Abigail Spears
- (Canada) Marie-Ève Pelletier
- (Slovakia) Lenka Wienerová
