= 2011 Texas Tennis Open – Doubles =

Doubles
- 2011 Texas Tennis Open

Final
- Champions: (Italy) Alberta Brianti (Romania) Sorana Cîrstea
- Runners-up: (France) Alizé Cornet (France) Pauline Parmentier
- Score: 7–5, 6–3

Events
Singles	Doubles
Texas Tennis Open	· 2012 →

Alberta Brianti and Sorana Cîrstea defeated all opponents and won against Alizé Cornet and Pauline Parmentier in the final to win the title.

== Seeds ==
All seeds received a bye into the quarterfinals.

1. (Sweden) Johanna Larsson / (Germany) Jasmin Wöhr (quarterfinals)
2. (Slovenia) Andreja Klepač / (Belarus) Tatiana Poutchek (quarterfinals)
3. (Sweden) Sofia Arvidsson / (Australia) Casey Dellacqua (semifinals)
4. (Romania) Irina-Camelia Begu / (Turkey) İpek Şenoğlu (semifinals)

== Draw ==
=== Key ===
- Q = Qualifier
- WC = Wild card
- LL = Lucky loser
- Alt = Alternate
- SE = Special exempt
- PR = Protected ranking
- ITF = ITF entry
- JE = Junior exempt
- w/o = Walkover
- r = Retired
- d = Defaulted
- SR = Special ranking

=== Draw ===
First round
(United States) I Falconi (United States) S Tweedie-Yates	5	2
(France) A Cornet (France) P Parmentier	7	6
(United States) R Foster (United States) E Lumpkin	3	1
(United States) M Oudin (South Africa) C Scheepers	6	6
(Latvia) L Dekmeijere (United States) M Moulton-Levy	6	6
(Germany) A Kerber (Belarus) A Yakimova	4	2
(Ukraine) K Bondarenko (Ukraine) A Bondarenko	3	6	[9]
(Italy) A Brianti (Romania) S Cîrstea	6	3	[11]

Quarterfinals
1	(Sweden) J Larsson (Germany) J Wöhr	4	6	[1]
(France) A Cornet (France) P Parmentier	6	1	[10]
4	(Romania) I-C Begu (Turkey) İ Şenoğlu	w/o
(United States) M Oudin (South Africa) C Scheepers
(Latvia) L Dekmeijere (United States) M Moulton-Levy	5	7	[8]
3	(Sweden) S Arvidsson (Australia) C Dellacqua	7	5	[10]
(Italy) A Brianti (Romania) S Cîrstea	7^{7}	6^{0}	[12]
2	(Slovenia) A Klepač (Belarus) T Poutchek	6^{2}	7^{7}	[10]

Semifinals
(France) A Cornet (France) P Parmentier	6	6
4	(Romania) I-C Begu (Turkey) İ Şenoğlu	3	3
3	(Sweden) S Arvidsson (Australia) C Dellacqua	3	3
(Italy) A Brianti (Romania) S Cîrstea	6	6

Final
(France) A Cornet (France) P Parmentier	5	3
(Italy) A Brianti (Romania) S Cîrstea	7	6
