= 2012 Texas Tennis Open =

- Date: August 17 – August 24
- Edition: 2nd
- Location: Grapevine, Texas

Champions

Singles
- (Italy) Roberta Vinci

Doubles
- (New Zealand) Marina Erakovic / (United Kingdom) Heather Watson
← 2011 ·	Texas Tennis Open

The 2012 Texas Tennis Open was a tennis tournament played on outdoor hard courts. It was the second edition of the tournament. It was classified as one of the WTA International tournaments of the 2012 WTA Tour. It took place in Dallas, United States from 17 to 24 August 2012.

== Singles main-draw entrants ==
=== Seeds ===
Country	Player	Rank^{1}	Seed
GER	Angelique Kerber	7	1
SRB	Jelena Janković	18	2
ITA	Roberta Vinci	26	3
BEL	Yanina Wickmayer	30	4
CZE	Klára Zakopalová	31	5
CHN	Peng Shuai	32	6
RSA	Chanelle Scheepers	40	7
ROU	Sorana Cîrstea	41	8

- ^{1} Seedings are based on the rankings of August 13, 2012

=== Other entrants ===
The following players received wildcards into the singles main draw

- (Australia) Jarmila Gajdošová
- (Serbia) Bojana Jovanovski
- (Belgium) Yanina Wickmayer

The following players received entry from the qualifying draw:

- (Canada) Eugenie Bouchard
- (Australia) Casey Dellacqua
- (Croatia) Mirjana Lučić
- (France) Pauline Parmentier

The following player entry as lucky loser:

- (United Kingdom) Emily Webley-Smith

=== Withdrawals ===
- (Germany) Angelique Kerber (left shoulder injury)
- (Germany) Sabine Lisicki (left abdominal sprain)
- (Romania) Monica Niculescu (hand injury)
- (Kazakhstan) Ksenia Pervak
- (Poland) Urszula Radwańska

=== Retirements ===
- (Netherlands) Kiki Bertens (right abdominal injury)
- (China) Peng Shuai (right shoulder injury)

== Doubles main-draw entrants ==
=== Seeds ===
Country	Player	Country	Player	Rank^{1}	Seed
CZE	Iveta Benešová	CZE	Barbora Záhlavová-Strýcová	46	1
ROU	Irina-Camelia Begu	FRA	Alizé Cornet	108	2
AUS	Jarmila Gajdošová	CZE	Klára Zakopalová	116	3
NZL	Marina Erakovic	GBR	Heather Watson	130	4

- ^{1} Rankings are as of August 13, 2012

=== Other entrants ===
The following pairs received wildcards into the doubles main draw:

- (United States) Roxanne Ellison / (United States) Sierra Ellison
- (United States) Emily Harman / (United States) Simone Kalhorn

The following pair received entry as alternates:

- (Canada) Eugenie Bouchard / (Canada) Aleksandra Wozniak

=== Withdrawals ===
- (Netherlands) Kiki Bertens (right abdominal injury)

== Champions ==
=== Singles ===
(Italy) Roberta Vinci def. (Serbia) Jelena Janković, 7–5, 6–3

=== Doubles ===
(New Zealand) Marina Erakovic / (United Kingdom) Heather Watson def. (Latvia) Līga Dekmeijere / (United States) Irina Falconi, 6–3, 6–0
