= 2011 Texas Tennis Open – Singles =

Singles
- 2011 Texas Tennis Open

Final
- Champion: (Germany) Sabine Lisicki
- Runner-up: (France) Aravane Rezaï
- Score: 6–2, 6–1

Events
Singles	Doubles
Texas Tennis Open	· 2012 →

Sabine Lisicki won the first edition of this tournament, defeating Aravane Rezaï in the final 6–2, 6–1. Her win came with the loss of only 13 games in 5 matches and a maximum loss of 3 games in each match.

== Seeds ==
1. (China) Peng Shuai (withdrew due to a hip injury)
2. (Slovakia) Dominika Cibulková (second round)
3. (Germany) Julia Görges (second round)
4. (Belgium) Yanina Wickmayer (first round, retired due to a lower back injury)
5. (Germany) Sabine Lisicki (champion)
6. (Israel) Shahar Pe'er (second round)
7. (Australia) Jarmila Gajdošová (first round)
8. (Romania) Irina-Camelia Begu (semifinals)

== Draw ==
=== Key ===
- Q = Qualifier
- WC = Wild card
- LL = Lucky loser
- Alt = Alternate
- SE = Special exempt
- PR = Protected ranking
- ITF = ITF entry
- JE = Junior exempt
- w/o = Walkover
- r = Retired
- d = Defaulted
- SR = Special ranking

=== Finals ===
Semifinals
Q	(Germany) Angelique Kerber	2	6	5
Q	(France) Aravane Rezaï	6	3	7
8	(Romania) Irina-Camelia Begu	0	1
5	(Germany) Sabine Lisicki	6	6

Final
Q	(France) Aravane Rezaï	2	1
5	(Germany) Sabine Lisicki	6	6

=== Top half ===
First round
LL	(Uzbekistan) A Amanmuradova	6^{6}	0	r
WC	(United States) M Oudin	7^{8}	1
Q	(South Africa) C Scheepers	6	2	5
Q	(Germany) A Kerber	4	6	7
(Romania) S Halep	3	2
(Sweden) J Larsson	6	6
(Belarus) A Yakimova	1	3
6/WC	(Israel) S Pe'er	6	6
3	(Germany) J Görges	0	6	6
(France) A Cornet	6	4	0
(United Kingdom) E Baltacha	6	6
(Czech Republic) B Záhlavová-Strýcová	2	1
Q	(France) A Rezaï	4	6	6
(Slovakia) M Rybáriková	6	2	1
(Romania) S Cîrstea	3	6	6
7	(Australia) J Gajdošová	6	4	2

Second round
WC	(United States) M Oudin	3	2
Q	(Germany) A Kerber	6	6
(Sweden) J Larsson	6	6
6/WC	(Israel) S Pe'er	2	4
3	(Germany) J Görges	6	5	6^{2}
(United Kingdom) E Baltacha	2	7	7^{7}
Q	(France) A Rezaï	6	7^{7}
(Romania) S Cîrstea	2	6^{4}

Quarterfinals
Q	(Germany) A Kerber	6	6
(Sweden) J Larsson	0	1
(United Kingdom) E Baltacha	2	2
Q	(France) A Rezaï	6	6

Semifinals
Q	(Germany) A Kerber	2	6	5
Q	(France) A Rezaï	6	3	7

=== Bottom half ===
First round
8	(Romania) I-C Begu	6	6
(France) P Parmentier	1	3
(Argentina) G Dulko	6	6
(Serbia) B Jovanovski	0	3
(Thailand) T Tanasugarn	4	4
(Latvia) A Sevastova	6	6
(Sweden) S Arvidsson	4	6	1
4	(Belgium) Y Wickmayer	6	0	0^{r}
5	(Germany) S Lisicki	6	6
(India) S Mirza	3	0
(Italy) A Brianti	6	6
WC	(United States) I Falconi	3	2
(Hungary) G Arn	2	3
Q	(Ukraine) K Bondarenko	6	6
(Croatia) M Lučić	4	0
2	(Slovakia) D Cibulková	6	6

Second round
8	(Romania) I-C Begu	6	6
(Argentina) G Dulko	4	3
(Latvia) A Sevastova	7^{7}	6
(Sweden) S Arvidsson	6^{4}	4
5	(Germany) S Lisicki	6	6
(Italy) A Brianti	1	2
Q	(Ukraine) K Bondarenko	6	6
2	(Slovakia) D Cibulková	3	1

Quarterfinals
8	(Romania) I-C Begu	6	6
(Latvia) A Sevastova	3	4
5	(Germany) S Lisicki	6	6
Q	(Ukraine) K Bondarenko	1	2

Semifinals
8	(Romania) I-C Begu	0	1
5	(Germany) S Lisicki	6	6
