= 2009 Family Circle Cup – Doubles =

Tennis tournament

Doubles
- 2009 Family Circle Cup

Final
- Champion: (United States) Bethanie Mattek-Sands (Russia) Nadia Petrova
- Runner-up: (Latvia) Līga Dekmeijere (Switzerland) Patty Schnyder
- Score: 6–7^{(5–7)}, 6–2, [11–9]

Details
- Draw: 16
- Seeds: 4

Events
Singles	Doubles
- Family Circle Cup

Katarina Srebotnik and Ai Sugiyama were the defending champions but chose not to participate this year.

== Seeds ==
1. (Czech Republic) Květa Peschke / (United States) Lisa Raymond (semifinals)
2. (Chinese Taipei) Chuang Chia-jung / (Russia) Elena Vesnina (quarterfinals)
3. (China) Peng Shuai / (China) Yan Zi (semifinals)
4. (United States) Bethanie Mattek-Sands / (Russia) Nadia Petrova (champions)

== Draw ==
Key

- Q = Qualifier
- WC = Wild card
- LL = Lucky loser
- Alt = Alternate
- ITF = ITF entry
- PR = Protected ranking
- SR = Special ranking
- SE = Special exempt
- JE = Junior exempt
- JR = Junior Accelerator Programme entrant
- CO = College Accelerator Programme entrant
- NG = Next Gen Accelerator Program entrant
- w/o = Walkover
- r = Retired
- d = Defaulted

=== Finals ===
First round
1	(Czech Republic) K Peschke (United States) L Raymond	6	3	[10]
(United States) J Craybas (United States) M Washington	3	6	[2]
(Chinese Taipei) C-w Chan (Belarus) O Govortsova	6	6
(United States) A Haynes (United States) L Osterloh	1	4
4	(United States) B Mattek-Sands (Russia) N Petrova	4	6	[10]
(United States) J Ditty (United States) C Gullickson	6	1	[7]
(Ukraine) M Koryttseva (Kazakhstan) G Voskoboeva	6	6
(Uzbekistan) A Amanmuradova (Ukraine) O Savchuk	2	3
WC	(United States) A Glatch (United States) S Perry	2	6	[10]
(Ukraine) A Bondarenko (Russia) A Rodionova	6	4	[7]
(United States) V King (Russia) A Kudryavtseva	3	6	[9]
3	(China) S Peng (China) Z Yan	6	4	[11]
(Latvia) L Dekmeijere (Switzerland) P Schnyder	7	6
(Hungary) M Czink (Czech Republic) B Záhlavová-Strýcová	5	4
(Argentina) B Jozami (Canada) M-È Pelletier	1	4
2	(Chinese Taipei) C-j Chuang (Russia) E Vesnina	6	6

Quarterfinals
1	(Czech Republic) K Peschke (United States) L Raymond	6	6
(Chinese Taipei) C-w Chan (Belarus) O Govortsova	4	3
4	(United States) B Mattek-Sands (Russia) N Petrova	6	6
(Ukraine) M Koryttseva (Kazakhstan) G Voskoboeva	0	4
WC	(United States) A Glatch (United States) S Perry	2	5
3	(China) S Peng (China) Z Yan	6	7
(Latvia) L Dekmeijere (Switzerland) P Schnyder	6
2	(Chinese Taipei) C-j Chuang (Russia) E Vesnina	1	r

Semifinals
1	(Czech Republic) K Peschke (United States) L Raymond	5	6	[6]
4	(United States) B Mattek-Sands (Russia) N Petrova	7	1	[10]
3	(China) S Peng (China) Z Yan	6	3	[8]
(Latvia) L Dekmeijere (Switzerland) P Schnyder	2	6	[10]

Final
4	(United States) B Mattek-Sands (Russia) N Petrova	6^{5}	6	[11]
(Latvia) L Dekmeijere (Switzerland) P Schnyder	7	2	[9]
