= Aravane Rezaï =

French-Iranian tennis player

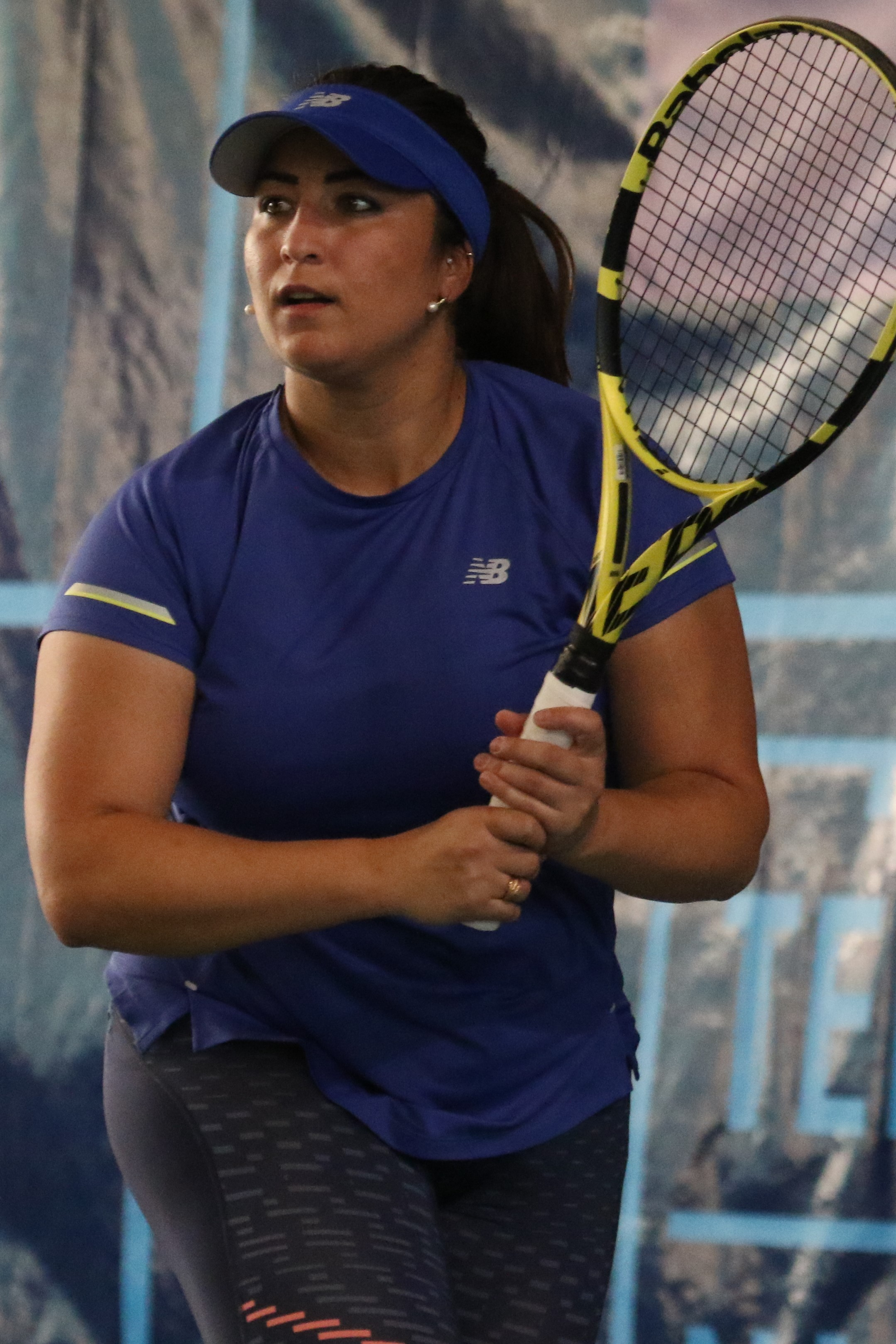
- Rezaï in 2021
- Country (sports): Iran (2001–2005); France (2005–present)
- Residence: Neuchâtel, Switzerland
- Born: 14 March 1987 (age 39) Saint-Étienne, France
- Height: 1.65 m (5 ft 5 in)
- Turned pro: January 2005
- Plays: Right-handed (two-handed backhand)
- Prize money: $2,820,096

Singles
- Career record: 315–231
- Career titles: 4
- Highest ranking: No. 15 (11 October 2010)

Grand Slam singles results
- Australian Open: 3R (2008)
- French Open: 4R (2009)
- Wimbledon: 3R (2007)
- US Open: 4R (2006)

Doubles
- Career record: 9–29
- Highest ranking: No. 118 (9 March 2009)

Grand Slam doubles results
- Australian Open: 1R (2007, 2008, 2010)
- French Open: 3R (2008)
- Wimbledon: 2R (2008, 2010)
- US Open: 2R (2008)

Team competitions
- Fed Cup: 2–2
- Last updated on: 15 August 2025.

Aravane Rezaï
Medal record

Women's tennis

Representing Iran

Women's Islamic Games
Gold medal – first place	2001 Iran	Singles
Gold medal – first place	2005 Iran	Singles

Aravane Rezaï (French: [aʁavan ʁɛza.i]; Persian: ارغوان رضایی Arghavān-e Rezāyi pronounced [æɾɣævɒːn(-e) ɾezɒːjiː], born 14 March 1987) is an Iranian–French former professional tennis player. Her career-high ranking is world No. 15, achieved on 11 October 2010.

== Personal life ==
Rezaï was born to Iranian parents in Saint-Étienne, France and lives in Switzerland. She took up tennis after a childhood stint as her older brother's ball girl. As of the November 14, 2005, WTA official rankings, she was listed under the name "REZAI BIDAKHAVIDI, ARAVANE".

== Career ==
In her career Rezaï has defeated many top players on the WTA Tour, such as Justine Henin, Venus Williams, Victoria Azarenka, Maria Sharapova, Dinara Safina, Francesca Schiavone, Caroline Wozniacki, Marion Bartoli, Flavia Pennetta, Jelena Janković, Petra Kvitova, Simona Halep, and Ai Sugiyama.

=== 2001–2008 ===
Rezaï competed for Iran at the Women's Islamic Games, winning gold in 2001 and 2005. She also won the Chambon-sur-Lignon Open in 2004.

Rezaï started playing for France in 2006. For the second year in a row, she lost in the qualifying rounds of the Australian Open. Her French Open run was more successful, where she struggled through to the tournament's third round, defeating Ai Sugiyama of Japan along the way. She fell to Nicole Vaidišová of the Czech Republic, in a hard-fought three-setter. At Wimbledon, she fell in the first qualifying round. At the US Open, she reached the fourth round, her career-best major singles result. She also competed on the ITF Circuit throughout the year, reaching the final of two tournaments and winning one in the later part of the year on the hardcourts of France.

Her 2007 year started poorly, reaching the second round only twice in her first 13 tournaments on tour, including a first-round loss at the Australian Open. At the WTA Tour clay tournament of Istanbul, Rezaï reached the final by beating world No. 29, Venus Williams, in the second round, and world No. 2, Maria Sharapova, in the semifinal. In the final, she lost to Elena Dementieva due to retiring, trailing 6–7, 0–3.

Despite her good performance in İstanbul, she lost the week after 2–6, 4–6 to fellow French Marion Bartoli in the first round of the French Open. In her first appearance in Wimbledon, she defeated Shenay Perry from the U.S. and Francesca Schiavone, the 29th seed, in the second round, in three sets. However, in the third round, she was defeated by Ana Ivanovic in straight sets. At the US Open in the second round, she once again lost to Ivanovic. She ended an appalling year with yet another ITF title in Deauville, France, losing only one set en route to her victory.

Despite being unseeded, Rezaï reached the final of the Auckland Open which she lost to Lindsay Davenport. However, her year stagnated with early losses in the first and second rounds of tournaments, and her only other grand success came on the clay of Morocco in mid-spring, where she reached the semifinals before falling to Gisela Dulko.

At the Australian Open, Rezaï reached the third round, beating 13th seed Tatiana Golovin in the second round 6–3, 3–6, 6–3, before losing to Hsieh Su-wei, also in three sets. Her major results for the rest of the year were disappointing. At the French Open, she fell to Nadia Petrova in the first round. At Wimbledon, she faced Gisela Dulko and pushed her to three sets but eventually fell 6–1, 0–6, 2–6. The US Open started well as she defeated Asia Muhammad in straight sets. However, she fell in the second round to Sybille Bammer, 1–6, 5–7.

=== 2009 ===
Rezaï won the first career title in Strasbourg, beating Lucie Hradecká in the final. Despite a first-round loss at the Australian Open, she flew to the fourth round of the French Open, after defeating Michelle Larcher de Brito, but lost to world No. 1 Dinara Safina 1–6, 0–6, effectively putting an end to her participation in Roland Garros. At Wimbledon, she beat Ayumi Morita 6–2, 6–2 but then lost to fourth seed Elena Dementieva 1–6, 3–6.

In the first round of Rogers Cup, she defeated Alizé Cornet in two sets. In the second round, she made the biggest upset of the tournament by defeating world No. 1, Dinara Safina, in three sets. In the third round, she was defeated by Alisa Kleybanova in two sets. Rezaï then lost at the US Open to Sabine Lisicki in the first round, her earliest loss ever at Flushing Meadows. At the Pan Pacific Open in Tokyo, Rezaï won her opening match in straight sets, defeating Sara Errani 6–2, 6–2. In the second round, she easily lost to Marion Bartoli.

Seeded 10th at the Tournament of Champions, Rezaï won her first round-robin match against fourth seed Sabine Lisicki, then beat Melinda Czink in her second match to make her the first player to advance to the semifinals of the inaugural event. She then went on to the semifinals where she beat María José Martínez Sánchez 6–2, 6–3. In the final, she faced Marion Bartoli and won the first set 7–5 before Bartoli retired. Because of her performance, Rezaï reached a new career-high of world No. 26.

=== 2010 ===
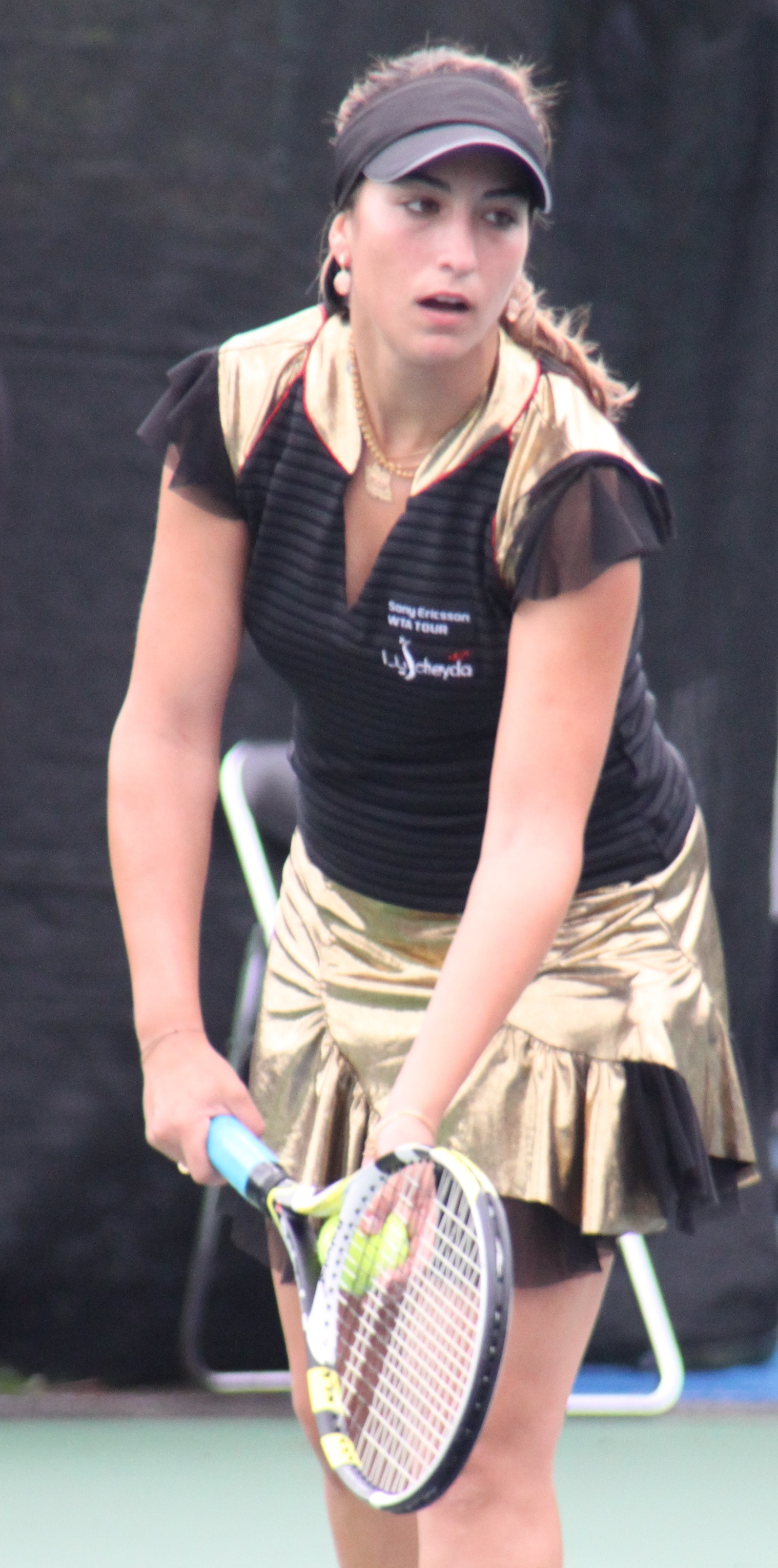
Rezaï in 2010

Her first tournament of the year was the Auckland Open, where she was seeded No. 7. In the first round, she beat countrymaid Julie Coin 6–4, 6–3. At the match point, the lights in the stadium went out, but they were fixed shortly after and Rezaï closed out the match. In the second round, she was defeated by Dominika Cibulková.

Her next tournament was the Sydney International. Rezaï won her first-round match against Anna-Lena Grönefeld in three sets, then faced Ágnes Szávay, whom she defeated in two. In the quarterfinals, she beat Flavia Pennetta 6–3, 6–0; in the semifinal she faced world No. 1, Serena Williams. She began strong, leading in the match by 6–3, 5–2, and was two points away from victory, but ended up losing 6–3, 5–7, 4–6.

Rezaï was seeded No. 26 for the Australian Open. She won her first-round match against Sania Mirza but was then defeated in the second round by Angelique Kerber. In the doubles draw she partnered with Sabine Lisicki, but they lost in the first round.

Her next tournament was the Open GdF Suez, where she was seeded No. 5. She won her first-round match against qualifier Evgeniya Rodina, 6–4, 6–4. In the second round, she faced Andrea Petkovic, getting upset 6–3, 3–6, 6–3 and spoiling her chance to play Elena Dementieva in the quarterfinals.

At the Madrid Open, Rezaï caused a huge upset in the first round, defeating former world No. 1 and four-time French Open champion, Justine Henin, 4–6, 7–5, 6–0. In the second round, she won her match against Klára Zakopalová, then defeated Andrea Petkovic in two sets. Rezaï pulled off a major fourth-round upset by defeating Jelena Janković in two straight sets. In the semifinal, she won against Lucie Šafářová reaching the most critical final in her career. She defeated Venus Williams in the final 6–2, 7–5, returning from a 2–5 deficit and overcoming numerous set points to win. Because of her performance at Madrid, Rezaï reached a new career-high ranking as No. 16. Seeded 15th at the French Open, Rezaï fell to No. 19 Nadia Petrova in the third round in three sets.

On grass, Rezaï played at the Birmingham Classic, cruising through the semifinals without dropping a set, but fell to eventual champion Li Na in three sets. She then played at the Eastbourne International, where she upset top seed Caroline Wozniacki in the first round, before retiring against María José Martínez Sánchez in the second, down 6–2, 3–0. At the Wimbledon Championships, as the 18th seed, she was upset by Klára Zakopalová in the second round.

At the Swedish Open, Rezaï cruised through the finals with wins over Arantxa Parra Santonja and Lucie Šafářová, finally facing Gisela Dulko. Rezaï won 6–3, 4–6, 6–4, despite giving up a 4–0 lead in the third set.

At the Cincinnati Open, Rezaï was upset by world No. 98, Bojana Jovanovski; even though she had "breathtaking" strokes, her serve was erratic with a high number of unforced errors.

Her disappointing level of play continued until the end of her season, as she lost in the first round of the Tournament of Champions. She won the title in 2009 but now lost to Alisa Kleybanova in the first round 1–6, 2–6.

=== 2011 ===
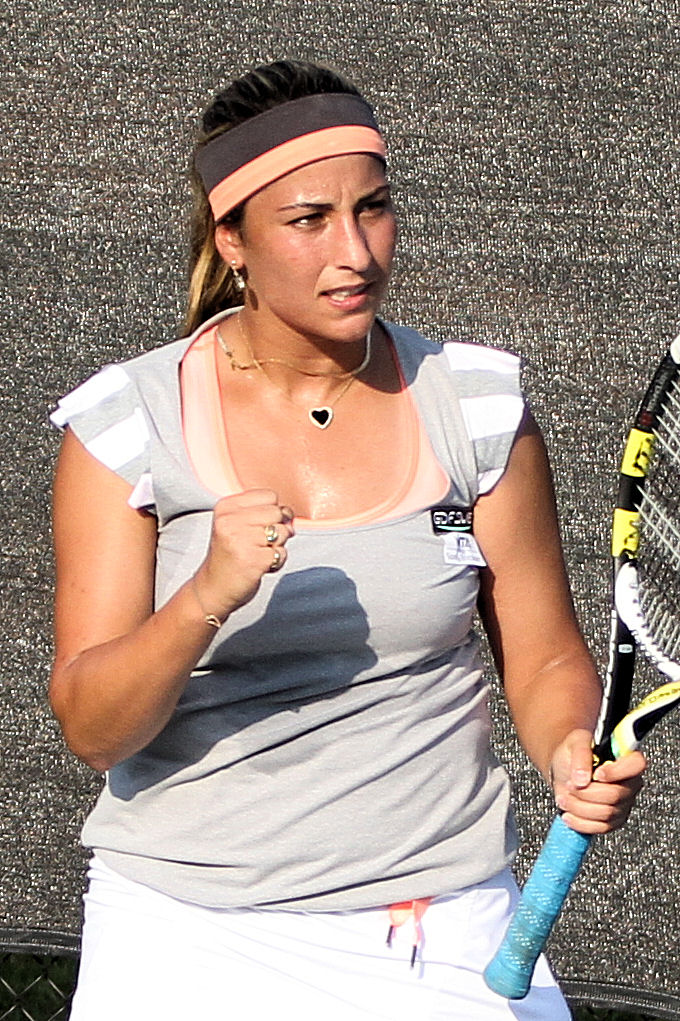
Rezaï at the 2011 Texas Tennis Open.

Rezaï obtained an invite from the Hong Kong Tennis Patrons' Association to play in the Hong Kong Tennis Classic with Caroline Wozniacki and Stefan Edberg for Team Europe. Still, they lost to Team Russia (including Vera Zvonareva, Maria Kirilenko and Yevgeny Kafelnikov) in the final of Gold Group.

She started off the year with a win over world No. 8, Jelena Janković but lost in the second round to Bojana Jovanovski 6–7, 6–7.

Seeded 17th, Rezaï competed at the Australian Open. She lost in the first round to Barbora Záhlavová-Strýcová of the Czech Republic in three sets.

Rezaï lost in the first round of the Monterrey Open to Alla Kudryavtseva 2–6, 1–6. At the Indian Wells Open, she reached the third round, before being defeated by Maria Sharapova in straight sets, losing 2–6, 2–6.

She lost in the first round of the Miami Open to Peng Shuai 0–6, 4–6.

Her poor form continued onto the start of the clay-court season. She lost in the first round of the Andalucia Tennis Experience in Marbella to world No. 258, Estrella Cabeza Candela, 3–6, 0–6.

She returned to form at the Texas Open, reaching the final which she lost to Sabine Lisicki in straight sets.

=== 2012–2014 ===
Rezaï started her year playing in Auckland, where she lost in the first round to Peng Shuai. In Sydney, she was forced to retire in the qualifying draw. She would also fall in round one of the Australian Open. She would then go on to lose in the qualifying of both Indian Wells and Miami, and fall in round two in Clearwater.

At the French Open, Rezaï lost in the first round to Romanian Irina-Camelia Begu three sets. She reached two ITF finals this year with a victory in the final at the Open 88 tournament in Contrexéville. Against Austrian Yvonne Meusburger, she won in three sets.

Rezaï lost in the first round of the French Open to Petra Kvitová, and also in the first qualifying round of the Wimbledon to Mariana Duque Mariño.

She lost in the first qualifying round of the Australian Open to Alla Kudryavtseva 4–6, 2–6.

=== 2015–2025: return to professional tennis ===
Rezaï announced her return to professional tennis after more than one-year absence by taking a wildcard into the qualifying draw of the French Open, losing to compatriot Julie Coin in the first round. Later that year, she played only two European tournaments, losing in the early games in both.

Rezaï did not play a tournament again until 2017, when she played three ITF tournaments in France but won only one match across the three, against Maria Novikova. She played one game each in November 2018 (in Luxembourg) and in July 2019 (in France), again falling in the early rounds of each.

== Political support ==
Rezaï told the Islamic Republic of Iran Broadcasting that she supported Iranian President Mahmoud Ahmadinejad. When the reporter asked her "Do you like Mr. Ahmadinejad?" and "why?", she responded that "Yes, I do a lot. Because he has shown Iran's power to the whole world, I am really proud of him."

In this interview, she also affirmed having presented two tennis rackets as a gift to Ahmadinejad. The footage of Rezaï presenting her tennis rackets to Ahmadinejad was used in his official campaign advertisement video during his 2009 presidential election campaign.

== Father's controversies ==
Rezaï's father, Arsalan Rezaï, who was a member of her coaching team, has repeatedly been the focus of controversial allegations of violence and abuse. In one interview, Aravane said, "I had tough moments, lots of sacrifices. I remember playing outside in the rain and snow." Her father mentioned the concern neighbors had about his training methods: "I had lots of problems to train this girl: lack of money and lack of courts. Some neighbors bothered us. They accused me, saying that this man was killing this child. But today, she's not dead. She's happy."

At one point, the French Tennis Federation was forced to employ bodyguards to prevent Arsalan from attacking other competitors' fathers. In one 2006 incident, Arsalan attacked Sergey Vesnin, the father of Elena Vesnina, and then accidentally hit his own daughter with a racquet. Aravane was denied training funds that are typically available to all French players, and she was also banned in 2007 from training with other players at Roland Garros because of her father's dispute with the French Fed Cup captain.

Just before her loss in the first round of the 2011 Australian Open, Arsalan was violent to his daughter and threatened her boyfriend. After losing the match, Aravane said, "I do not want to look for excuses but I had a lot of trouble on the morning of the match." The WTA indefinitely banned Arsalan from the tour, pending investigation. The incident was also investigated by the Victoria police.

== Performance timelines ==
Key
W	F	SF	QF	#R	RR	Q#	P#	DNQ	A	Z#	PO	G	S	B	NMS	NTI	P	NH

(W) winner; (F) finalist; (SF) semifinalist; (QF) quarterfinalist; (#R) rounds 4, 3, 2, 1; (RR) round-robin stage; (Q#) qualification round; (P#) preliminary round; (DNQ) did not qualify; (A) absent; (Z#) Davis/Fed Cup Zonal Group (with number indication) or (PO) play-off; (G) gold, (S) silver or (B) bronze Olympic/Paralympic medal; (NMS) not a Masters tournament; (NTI) not a Tier I tournament; (P) postponed; (NH) not held; (SR) strike rate (events won / competed); (W–L) win–loss record.
To avoid confusion and double counting, these charts are updated at the conclusion of a tournament or when the player's participation has ended.

Only main-draw results in WTA Tour, Grand Slam tournaments, Fed Cup and Olympic Games are included in win–loss records.

=== Singles ===
Tournament	2004	2005	2006	2007	2008	2009	2010	2011	2012	2013	2014	2015	SR	W–L	Win%
Grand Slam tournaments
Australian Open	A	A	Q1	1R	3R	1R	2R	1R	1R	A	Q1	A	0 / 6	3–6	33%
French Open	Q1	2R	3R	1R	1R	4R	3R	1R	1R	1R	A	Q1	0 / 9	8–9	47%
Wimbledon	A	A	Q1	3R	1R	2R	2R	1R	Q2	Q1	A	A	0 / 5	4–5	44%
US Open	A	A	4R	2R	2R	1R	2R	1R	Q1	A	A	A	0 / 6	6–6	50%
Win–loss	0–0	1–1	5–2	3–4	3–4	4–4	5–4	0–4	0–2	0–1	0–0	0–0	0 / 26	21–26	45%
Year-end championships
WTA Elite Trophy (Note: Formerly known as WTA Tournament of Champions until 2015.)	NH					W	1R	DNQ					1 / 2	4–1	80%
WTA 1000 + former
Dubai / Qatar Open (Note: The first Premier 5 event of the year has switched back and forth between the Dubai Tennis Championships and the Qatar Ladies Open since 2009. Dubai was classified as a Premier 5 event from 2009 to 2011 before being succeeded by Doha for the 2012–2014. 2015 Dubai regained its Premier 5 status while Doha was demoted to Premier status. The Premier 5 tournaments were reclassified as WTA 1000 tournaments in 2021.)	NMS				A	A	2R	A	2R	A	A	A	0 / 2	1–1	50%
Indian Wells Open	A	A	A	1R	2R	Q2	4R	3R	Q1	A	A	A	0 / 4	4–4	50%
Miami Open	A	A	A	1R	1R	1R	2R	2R	Q2	A	A	A	0 / 5	0–5	0%
German / Madrid Open (Note: In 2009, the German Open was replaced by the Madrid Open. The Premier Mandatory tournaments were reclassified as WTA 1000 tournaments in 2021.)	A	A	A	1R	1R	2R	W	1R	A	Q2	A	A	1 / 5	7–4	64%
Italian Open	A	A	A	1R	A	2R	2R	A	A	A	A	A	0 / 3	2–3	40%
Canadian Open	A	A	A	1R	1R	3R	2R	Q1	1R	A	A	A	0 / 5	3–5	38%
Cincinnati Open	NMS					1R	1R	A	Q1	A	A	A	0 / 2	0–2	0%
Pan Pacific / Wuhan Open (Note: In 2014, the Pan Pacific Open was downgraded to a Premier event and replaced by the Wuhan Open. The Premier 5 tournaments were reclassified as WTA 1000 tournaments in 2021.)	A	A	A	A	1R	2R	2R	Q2	A	A	A	A	0 / 3	2–3	40%
China Open	NMS					1R	1R	A	A	A	A	A	0 / 2	0–2	0%
Charleston Open (former)	A	A	A	2R	2R	NMS							0 / 2	2–2	50%
Kremlin Cup (former)	A	A	A	A	Q3	NMS							0 / 0	0–0	–
Win–loss	0–0	0–0	0–0	1–6	2–6	5–7	12–8	1–3	0–1	0–0	0–0	0–0	1 / 33	21–31	40%
Career statistics
	2004	2005	2006	2007	2008	2009	2010	2011	2012	2013	2014	2015	SR	W–L	Win%
Tournaments	0	2	6	21	17	20	26	20	6	2	0	0	Career total: 120		
Titles	0	0	0	0	0	2	2	0	0	0	0	0	Career total: 4		
Finals	0	0	0	1	1	2	2	1	0	0	0	0	Career total: 7		
Hard win–loss	0–0	0–0	7–3	1–9	8–8	11–10	12–15	9–11	1–4	0–0	0–0	0–0	1 / 61	49–60	45%
Clay win–loss	0–0	1–1	5–3	5–9	4–6	12–5	18–6	3–7	0–2	0–2	0–0	0–0	3 / 42	48–41	54%
Grass win–loss	0–0	0–1	0–0	2–2	2–3	3–2	5–3	1–3	0–0	0–0	0–0	0–0	0 / 14	13–14	48%
Carpet win–loss	0–0	0–0	0–0	0–1	0–0	0–1	1–1	0–0	0–0	0–0	0–0	0–0	0 / 3	1–3	25%
Overall win–loss	0–0	1–2	12–6	8–21	14–17	26–18	36–25	13–21	1–6	0–2	0–0	0–0	4 / 120	111–118	48%
Win (%)	–	33%	67%	28%	45%	59%	59%	38%	14%	0%	–	–	Career total: 48%		
Year-end ranking		189	49	80	74	26	19	113	169	513	887		$2,812,513		

=== Doubles ===
Tournament	2006	2007	2008	2009	2010	2011	2012	2013	SR	W–L	Win%
Grand Slam tournaments
Australian Open	A	1R	1R	A	1R	A	A	A	0 / 3	0–3	0%
French Open	A	1R	3R	1R	2R	2R	1R	1R	0 / 7	4–7	36%
Wimbledon	A	1R	2R	1R	2R	1R	A	A	0 / 5	2–5	29%
US Open	1R	1R	2R	1R	1R	A	A	A	0 / 5	1–5	17%
Win–loss	0–1	0–4	4–4	0–3	2–4	1–2	0–1	0–1	0 / 20	7–20	26%
WTA 1000
Pan Pacific / Wuhan Open	A	A	1R	A	A	A	A	A	0 / 1	0–1	0%
Win–loss	0–0	0–0	0–1	0–0	0–0	0–0	0–0	0–0	0 / 1	0–1	0%
Career statistics
Tournaments	1	5	6	3	6	3	1	1	Career total: 26		
Overall win–loss	0–1	0–5	4–6	0–3	3–6	1–3	0–1	0–1	0 / 26	8–26	24%
Year-end ranking	n/a	850	126	861	159	359	n/a	786			

== Significant finals ==
=== WTA Elite Trophy ===
==== Singles: 1 (title) ====
Result	Year	Tournament	Surface	Opponent	Score
Win	2009	Elite Trophy13–31	Hard	(France) Marion Bartoli	7–5, ret.

=== WTA 1000 tournaments ===
==== Singles: 1 (title) ====
Result	Year	Tournament	Surface	Opponent	Score
Win	2010	Madrid Open	Clay	(United States) Venus Williams	6–2, 7–5

== WTA Tour finals ==
=== Singles: 7 (4 titles, 3 runner-ups) ===
Legend WTA Elite Trophy (1–0) WTA 1000 (1–0) WTA 500 WTA 250 (2–3)	Finals by surface Hard (1–2) Grass (0–0) Clay (3–1) Carpet (0–0)

Result	W–L	Date	Tournament	Tier	Surface	Opponent	Score
Loss	0–1	May 2007	İstanbul Cup, Turkey	Tier III (Note: In 2009, the WTA Tier II tournaments were reclassified as WTA Premier tournaments, while the WTA Tier III tournaments, WTA Tier IV tournaments and WTA Tier V tournaments were reclassified as WTA International tournaments. In 2021, the WTA Premier tournaments were reclassified as WTA 500 tournaments and WTA International tournaments as WTA 250 tournaments.)	Clay	(Russia) Elena Dementieva	6–7^{(5–7)}, 0–3 ret.
Loss	0–2	Jan 2008	Auckland Open, New Zealand	Tier IV	Hard	(United States) Lindsay Davenport	2–6, 2–6
Win	1–2	May 2009	Internationaux de Strasbourg, France	International	Clay	(Czech Republic) Lucie Hradecká	7–6^{(7–2)}, 6–1
Win	2–2	Nov 2009	WTA Tournament of Champions, Bali	Elite	Hard (i)	(France) Marion Bartoli	7–5, ret.
Win	3–2	May 2010	Madrid Open, Spain	Premier M (Note: THe WTA Tier I tournaments were reclassified as Premier M & Premier 5 in 2009 and later as WTA 1000 tournaments in 2021.)	Clay	(United States) Venus Williams	6–2, 7–5
Win	4–2	Jul 2010	Swedish Open, Sweden	International	Clay	(Argentina) Gisela Dulko	6–3, 4–6, 6–4
Loss	4–3	Aug 2011	Texas Open, United States	International	Hard	(Germany) Sabine Lisicki	2–6, 1–6

== ITF finals ==
=== Singles: 12 (8 titles, 4 runner-ups) ===
Legend
$100,000 tournaments
$75,000 tournaments
$50,000 tournaments
$25,000 tournaments
$10,000 tournaments

Result	W–L	Date	Tournament	Tier	Surface	Opponent	Score
Loss	0–1	Jan 2004	ITF Grenoble, France	10,000	Hard (i)	(Germany) Martina Müller	5–7, 1–6
Win	1–1	Oct 2004	ITF Castel Gandolfo, Italy	10,000	Clay	(Italy) Anna Floris	3–6, 6–2, 7–5
Win	2–1	Oct 2004	ITF Settimo San Pietro, Italy	10,000	Clay	(Romania) Liana Ungur	6–3, 6–4
Win	3–1	Mar 2005	ITF Rome, Italy	10,000	Clay	(Bulgaria) Maria Penkova	6–2, 6–3
Win	4–1	May 2005	Open Saint-Gaudens, France	50,000	Clay	(Germany) Stephanie Gehrlein	6–4, 2–6, 6–2
Loss	4–2	Aug 2005	ITF Coimbra, Portugal	25,000	Hard	(Romania) Monica Niculescu	3–6, 1–6
Win	5–2	Mar 2006	ITF Telde, Spain	25,000	Clay	(Spain) Magüi Serna	6–4, 6–1
Loss	5–3	Mar 2006	ITF Fuerteventura, Spain	25,000	Hard	(Netherlands) Elise Tamaëla	3–6, 6–3, 3–6
Win	6–3	Nov 2006	ITF Poitiers, France	75,000	Hard (i)	(Croatia) Ivana Lisjak	7–6^{(9–7)}, 6–1
Win	7–3	Nov 2007	ITF Deauville, France	50,000	Clay (i)	(Belgium) Kirsten Flipkens	6–4, 6–3
Loss	7–4	Jul 2012	ITF Middelburg, Belgium	25,000	Clay	(Belgium) Kirsten Flipkens	1–6, 0–6
Win	8–4	Jul 2012	Contrexéville Open, France	50,000	Clay	(Austria) Yvonne Meusburger	6–3, 2–6, 6–3

== Best Grand Slam results details ==
=== Singles ===
	Australian Open			
2008 Australian Open
Round	Opponent	Rank	Score	ARR
1R	(Ukraine) Kateryna Bondarenko	No. 43	7–6^{(7–4)}, 6–2	No. 69
2R	(France) Tatiana Golovin (13)	No. 13	6–3, 3–6, 6–3	No. 69
3R	(Chinese Taipei) Hsieh Su-wei (Q)	No. 158	2–6, 7–6^{(7–3)}, 4–6	No. 69

	French Open			
2009 French Open
Round	Opponent	Rank	Score	ARR
1R	(Japan) Ai Sugiyama	No. 37	6–3, 6–2	No. 57
2R	(Slovenia) Polona Hercog (Q)	No. 167	3–6, 6–4, 6–2	No. 57
3R	(Portugal) Michelle Larcher de Brito (Q)	No. 132	7–6^{(7–3)}, 6–2	No. 57
4R	(Russia) Dinara Safina (1)	No. 1	1–6, 0–6	No. 57

	Wimbledon Championships			
2007 Wimbledon
Round	Opponent	Rank	Score	ARR
1R	(United States) Shenay Perry	No. 88	6–2, 7–6^{(7–4)}	No. 60
2R	(Italy) Francesca Schiavone (29)	No. 30	6–4, 2–6, 6–4	No. 60
3R	(Serbia) Ana Ivanovic (6)	No. 6	3–6, 2–6	No. 60

	US Open			
2006 US Open
Round	Opponent	Rank	Score	ARR
1R	(Germany) Anna-Lena Grönefeld (15)	No. 16	2–6, 6–0, 6–4	No. 96
2R	(Czech Republic) Lucie Šafářová	No. 43	7–6^{(4–7)}, 2–6, 6–4	No. 96
3R	(Russia) Maria Kirilenko (20)	No. 24	6–3, 6–1	No. 96
4R	(Russia) Elena Dementieva (4)	No. 6	5–7, 4–6	No. 96

== Top 10 wins ==
Season	2007	2008	2009	2010	2011	Total
Wins	1	0	1	3	1	6

#	Opponent	Rank	Event	Surface	Round	Score	ARR
2007
1.	(Russia) Maria Sharapova	No. 2	Istanbul Cup, Turkey	Clay	SF	6–2, 6–4	No. 59
2009
2.	(Russia) Dinara Safina	No. 1	Canadian Open	Hard	2R	3–6, 6–2, 6–4	No. 39
2010
3.	(Serbia) Jelena Janković	No. 4	Madrid Open, Spain	Clay	QF	7–5, 6–4	No. 24
4.	(United States) Venus Williams	No. 3	Madrid Open, Spain	Clay	F	6–2, 7–5	No. 24
5.	(Denmark) Caroline Wozniacki	No. 3	Eastbourne International, UK	Grass	1R	6–4, 1–6, 6–3	No. 19
2011
6.	(Serbia) Jelena Janković	No. 8	Sydney International, Australia	Hard	1R	7–5, 2–6, 6–3	No. 19

== See also ==
- Muslim women in sport
- List of Iranian women athletes
