= 2011 Texas Tennis Open =

Tennis tournament

- Date: August 21 – August 27
- Edition: 1st

Champions

Singles
- (Germany) Sabine Lisicki

Doubles
- (Italy) Alberta Brianti / (Romania) Sorana Cîrstea
Texas Tennis Open	· 2012 →

The 2011 Texas Tennis Open was a tennis tournament played on outdoor hard courts. It was the first edition of the tournament . It was classified as one of the WTA International tournaments of the 2011 WTA Tour. It was played in Dallas, United States.

== WTA entrants ==
=== Seeds ===
Country	Player	Rank^{1}	Seed
CHN	Peng Shuai	15	1
SVK	Dominika Cibulková	16	2
GER	Julia Görges	20	3
BEL	Yanina Wickmayer	21	4
GER	Sabine Lisicki	22	5
ISR	Shahar Pe'er	24	6
AUS	Jarmila Gajdošová	30	7
ROU	Irina-Camelia Begu	46	8

- ^{1} Seedings are based on the rankings of August 15, 2011.

=== Other entrants ===
The following players received wildcards into the singles main draw

- (United States) Irina Falconi
- (United States) Melanie Oudin
- (Israel) Shahar Pe'er

The following players received entry from the qualifying draw:

- (Ukraine) Kateryna Bondarenko
- (Germany) Angelique Kerber
- (France) Aravane Rezaï
- (South Africa) Chanelle Scheepers

The following player received entry from a Lucky loser spot:

- (Uzbekistan) Akgul Amanmuradova

== Champions ==
=== Singles ===
(Germany) Sabine Lisicki def. (France) Aravane Rezaï, 6–2, 6–1

- It was Lisicki's 2nd title of the year and 3rd of her career.

=== Doubles ===
(Italy) Alberta Brianti / (Romania) Sorana Cîrstea def. (France) Alizé Cornet / (France) Pauline Parmentier, 7–5, 6–3
