= 2009 Family Circle Cup – Singles =

Singles
- 2009 Family Circle Cup

Final
- Champion: (Germany) Sabine Lisicki
- Runner-up: (Denmark) Caroline Wozniacki
- Score: 6–2, 6–4

Details
- Draw: 56
- Seeds: 16

Events
Singles	Doubles
- Family Circle Cup

Serena Williams was the defending champion, but withdrew due to a left leg injury.

Sabine Lisicki won her maiden WTA tour title, defeating Caroline Wozniacki in the final 6–2, 6–4.

Dinara Safina gained the World No. 1 ranking for the first time at the conclusion of this tournament, despite not participating. This was because Williams' withdrawal, and loss of her championship ranking points, allowed her to be superseded by Safina in the rankings.

== Seeds ==
The top eight seeds receive a bye into the second round.

1. (Russia) Elena Dementieva (semifinals)
2. (United States) Venus Williams (third round)
3. (Russia) Vera Zvonareva (third round, retired due to right ankle injury)
4. (Russia) Nadia Petrova (third round)
5. (Denmark) Caroline Wozniacki (finals)
6. (France) Marion Bartoli (semifinals)
7. (Slovakia) Dominika Cibulková (quarterfinals, retired due to leg injury)
8. (Switzerland) Patty Schnyder (second round)
9. (Canada) Aleksandra Wozniak (second round)
10. (China) Peng Shuai (third round)
11. (Ukraine) Alona Bondarenko (second round)
12. (United States) Bethanie Mattek-Sands (second round)
13. (France) Virginie Razzano (quarterfinals)
14. (Belarus) Olga Govortsova (first round)
15. (Czech Republic) Barbora Záhlavová-Strýcová (first round)
16. (Germany) Sabine Lisicki (champion)

== Draw ==
Key

- Q = Qualifier
- WC = Wild card
- LL = Lucky loser
- Alt = Alternate
- ITF = ITF entry
- PR = Protected ranking
- SR = Special ranking
- SE = Special exempt
- JE = Junior exempt
- JR = Junior Accelerator Programme entrant
- CO = College Accelerator Programme entrant
- NG = Next Gen Accelerator Program entrant
- w/o = Walkover
- r = Retired
- d = Defaulted

=== Finals ===
Quarterfinals
1/WC	(Russia) Elena Dementieva	6	1
7	(Slovakia) Dominika Cibulková	4	0^{r}
13	(France) Virginie Razzano	2	0
5	(Denmark) Caroline Wozniacki	6	6
6	(France) Marion Bartoli	6	6
(Hungary) Melinda Czink	4	1
(Russia) Elena Vesnina	4	0
16	(Germany) Sabine Lisicki	6	6

Semifinals
1/WC	(Russia) Elena Dementieva	4	7	5
5	(Denmark) Caroline Wozniacki	6	5	7
6	(France) Marion Bartoli	3	1
16	(Germany) Sabine Lisicki	6	6

Final
5	(Denmark) Caroline Wozniacki	2	4
16	(Germany) Sabine Lisicki	6	6

=== Top half ===
==== Section 1 ====
First round
(United States) J Ditty	6	6
(Japan) A Morita	1	1
(United States) V Lepchenko	6	6
(Kazakhstan) G Voskoboeva	1	3
Q	(United States) S Perry	7	6
15	(Czech Republic) B Záhlavová-Strýcová	5	1
12	(United States) B Mattek-Sands	7	7
(Colombia) M Duque Marino	6^{3}	5
(Russia) A Rodionova	6	7
Q	(United States) M Brengle	2	6^{4}
(Germany) J Schruff	5	2
(Austria) T Paszek	7	6

Second round
1/WC	(Russia) E Dementieva	6	6
(United States) J Ditty	0	2
(United States) V Lepchenko	6	6
Q	(United States) S Perry	2	3
12	(United States) B Mattek-Sands	2	4
(Russia) A Rodionova	6	6
(Austria) T Paszek	4	0
7	(Slovakia) D Cibulková	6	6

Third round
1/WC	(Russia) E Dementieva	6	6
(United States) V Lepchenko	1	1
(Russia) A Rodionova	7	2	3
7	(Slovakia) D Cibulková	6^{6}	6	6

Quarterfinals
1/WC	(Russia) E Dementieva	6	1
7	(Slovakia) D Cibulková	4	0^{r}

==== Section 2 ====
First round
(Paraguay) R de los Ríos	6	6
(United States) C Gullickson	1	4
(Canada) S Dubois	4	6	6
(United Kingdom) K O'Brien	6	2	1
WC	(United States) M Cecil	1	2
13	(France) V Razzano	6	6
10	(China) S Peng	6	6
WC	(Russia) A Pivovarova	0	2
(Uzbekistan) A Amanmuradova	6	6
WC	(United States) A Stevenson	2	4
Q	(United States) A Haynes	4	7	0
(Russia) A Kudryavtseva	6	5	6

Second round
3	(Russia) V Zvonareva	6	6
(Paraguay) R de los Ríos	3	2
(Canada) S Dubois	3	6^{3}
13	(France) V Razzano	6	7
10	(China) S Peng	7	2	7
(Uzbekistan) A Amanmuradova	5	6	5
(Russia) A Kudryavtseva	3	3
5	(Denmark) C Wozniacki	6	6

Third round
3	(Russia) V Zvonareva	1^{r}
13	(France) V Razzano	1
10	(China) S Peng	3	4
5	(Denmark) C Wozniacki	6	6

Quarterfinals
13	(France) V Razzano	2	0
5	(Denmark) C Wozniacki	6	6

=== Bottom half ===
==== Section 3 ====
First round
Q	(Latvia) A Sevastova	6	1	6
(Poland) M Domachowska	1	6	4
Q	(United States) M Oudin	6	6
(Ukraine) O Savchuk	4	0
Q	(United States) A Spears	3	6	0
9	(Canada) A Wozniak	6	4	6
14	(Belarus) O Govortsova	7	6^{5}	3
(United States) V King	6^{3}	7	6
(Hungary) M Czink	6	6
(United States) J Craybas	2	4
(China) Z Yan	2	2
(Austria) P Mayr	6	6

Second round
6	(France) M Bartoli	6	6
Q	(Latvia) A Sevastova	1	3
Q	(United States) M Oudin	7	6
9	(Canada) A Wozniak	5	0
(United States) V King	4	2
(Hungary) M Czink	6	6
(Austria) P Mayr	1	6	2
4	(Russia) N Petrova	6	2	6

Third round
6	(France) M Bartoli	6	6
Q	(United States) M Oudin	4	1
(Hungary) M Czink	3	6	7
4	(Russia) N Petrova	6	4	5

Quarterfinals
6	(France) M Bartoli	6	6
(Hungary) M Czink	4	1

==== Section 4 ====
First round
(Russia) E Vesnina	6	6
(Russia) E Rodina	0	2
(Ukraine) M Koryttseva	1	1
(Ukraine) V Kutuzova	6	6
(Luxembourg) A Kremer	4	0
11	(Ukraine) A Bondarenko	6	6
16	(Germany) S Lisicki	7	6
Q	(Canada) M-È Pelletier	5	4
(United States) A Glatch	4	5
Q	(Slovakia) L Wienerová	6	7
(India) S Mirza	6	6
(Kazakhstan) S Karatantcheva	4	4

Second round
8	(Switzerland) P Schnyder	2	7	5
(Russia) E Vesnina	6	6^{5}	7
(Ukraine) V Kutuzova	6	7
11	(Ukraine) A Bondarenko	4	5
16	(Germany) S Lisicki	6	6
Q	(Slovakia) L Wienerová	4	3
(India) S Mirza	1	6	2
2	(United States) V Williams	6	3	6

Third round
(Russia) E Vesnina	7	7
(Ukraine) V Kutuzova	6^{4}	5
16	(Germany) S Lisicki	6	7
2	(United States) V Williams	4	6^{5}

Quarterfinals
(Russia) E Vesnina	4	0
16	(Germany) S Lisicki	6	6

== Qualifying ==
=== Qualifying seeds ===
1. (South Africa) Chanelle Scheepers (first round)
2. (United States) Angela Haynes (qualified)
3. (Argentina) Betina Jozami (qualifying competition)
4. (Slovakia) Lenka Wienerová (qualified)
5. (Georgia (country)) Anna Tatishvili (qualifying competition)
6. (Kyrgyzstan) Ksenia Palkina (first round)
7. (Russia) Ekaterina Bychkova (first round)
8. (United States) Lauren Albanese (first round)
9. (Slovakia) Kristína Kučová (qualifying competition)
10. (United States) Melanie Oudin (qualified)
11. (Russia) Alexandra Panova (first round)
12. (Latvia) Anastasija Sevastova (qualified)
13. (Chinese Taipei) Chan Chin-wei (qualifying competition)
14. (Ukraine) Tetiana Luzhanska (first round)
15. (United States) Abigail Spears (qualified)
16. (United States) Madison Brengle (qualified)

=== Qualifiers ===
1. (United States) Madison Brengle
2. (United States) Angela Haynes
3. (United States) Abigail Spears
4. (Slovakia) Lenka Wienerová
5. (United States) Melanie Oudin
6. (Canada) Marie-Ève Pelletier
7. (United States) Shenay Perry
8. (Latvia) Anastasija Sevastova

=== Qualifying draw ===
==== First qualifier ====
First round					Qualifying competition
1	(South Africa) Chanelle Scheepers	6	3	2
	(Colombia) Catalina Castaño	1	6	6		(Colombia) Catalina Castaño	6	2	2^{r}
WC	(United States) Gail Brodsky	4	2		16	(United States) Madison Brengle	3	6	5
16	(United States) Madison Brengle	6	6

==== Second qualifier ====
First round				Qualifying competition
2	(United States) Angela Haynes	6	6
	(Russia) Ekaterina Afinogenova	3	2	2	(United States) Angela Haynes	6	6
WC	(Latvia) Līga Dekmeijere	4	2	13	(Chinese Taipei) Chan Chin-wei	2	2
13	(Chinese Taipei) Chan Chin-wei	6	6

==== Third qualifier ====
First round					Qualifying competition
3	(Argentina) Betina Jozami	6	6
	(Germany) Angelika Rösch	1	4		3	(Argentina) Betina Jozami	1	1
WC	(United States) Alison Riske	6	3	4	15	(United States) Abigail Spears	6	6
15	(United States) Abigail Spears	4	6	6

==== Fourth qualifier ====
First round				Qualifying competition
4	(Slovakia) Lenka Wienerová	6	6
	(United States) Ahsha Rolle	2	2	4	(Slovakia) Lenka Wienerová	6	3	6
	(United States) Lilia Osterloh	7^{7}	6		(United States) Lilia Osterloh	3	6	1
11	(Russia) Alexandra Panova	6^{1}	1

==== Fifth qualifier ====
First round				Qualifying competition
5	(Georgia (country)) Anna Tatishvili	7^{7}	6
	(Venezuela) Gabriela Paz	6^{5}	3	5	(Georgia (country)) Anna Tatishvili	4	5
WC	(United States) Danielle Mills	0	2	10	(United States) Melanie Oudin	6	7
10	(United States) Melanie Oudin	6	6

==== Sixth qualifier ====
First round				Qualifying competition
6	(Kyrgyzstan) Ksenia Palkina	2	3
	(Canada) Marie-Ève Pelletier	6	6		(Canada) Marie-Ève Pelletier	6	6
WC	(United States) Mashona Washington	6	6	WC	(United States) Mashona Washington	4	4
14	(Ukraine) Tetiana Luzhanska	3	4

==== Seventh qualifier ====
First round				Qualifying competition
7	(Russia) Ekaterina Bychkova	3	3
	(United States) Shenay Perry	6	6		(United States) Shenay Perry	7	6
	(Slovakia) Zuzana Kučová	4	4	9	(Slovakia) Kristína Kučová	5	2
9	(Slovakia) Kristína Kučová	6	6

==== Eighth qualifier ====
First round					Qualifying competition
8	(United States) Lauren Albanese	5	2
WC	(Germany) Vanessa Henke	7	6		WC	(Germany) Vanessa Henke	6^{5}	1
	(Russia) Alina Jidkova	7^{7}	4	4	12	(Latvia) Anastasija Sevastova	7^{7}	6
12	(Latvia) Anastasija Sevastova	6^{3}	6	6
