= Emily Harman =

American tennis player (born 1991)

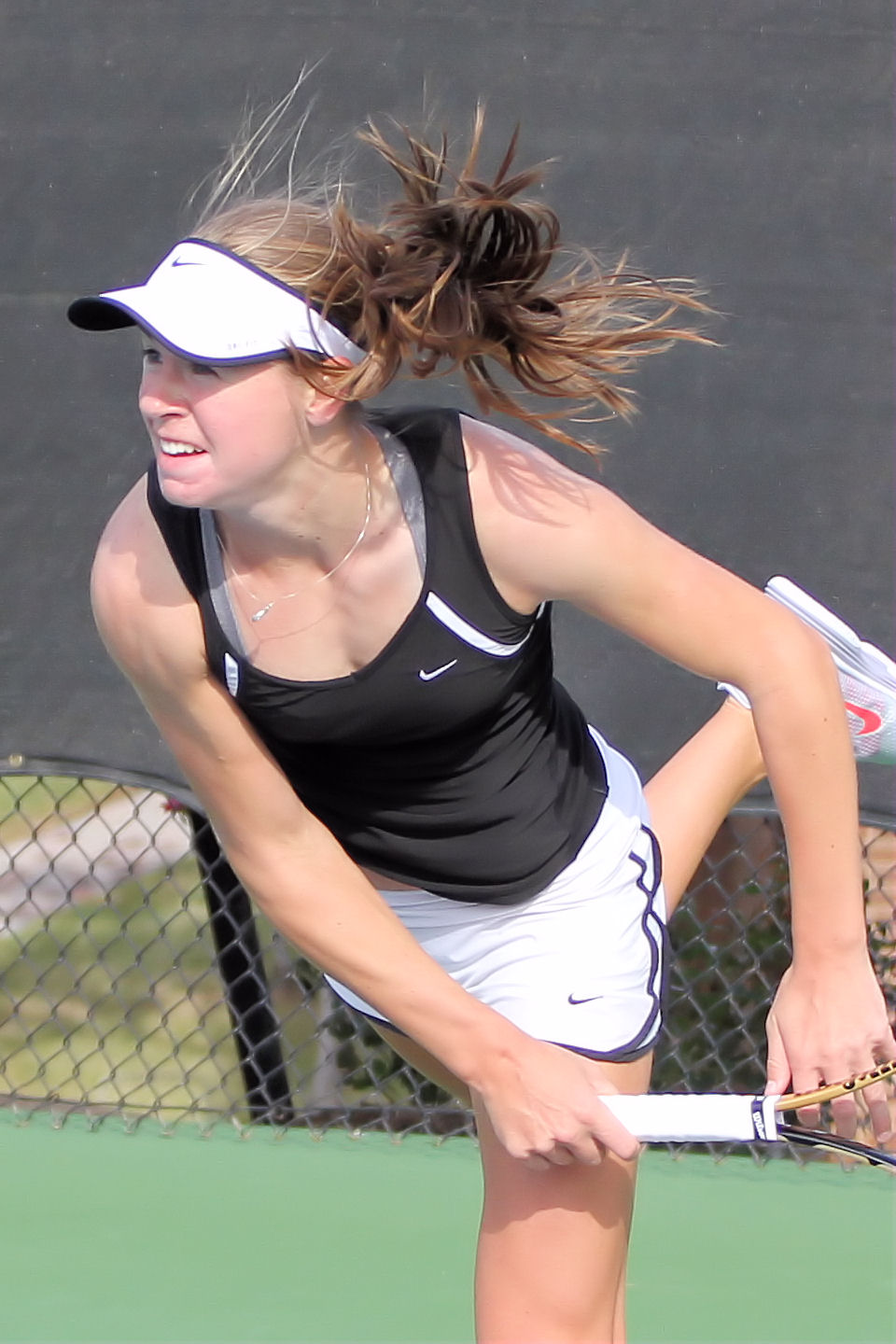
- Harman in 2011
- Full name: Emily Jane Harman
- Country (sports): United States
- Born: June 15, 1991 (age 34) Winchester, Virginia, U.S.
- Retired: 2019
- College: Syracuse University
- Coach: Luke Jensen
- Prize money: $20,159

Singles
- Career record: 28–62
- Career titles: 0
- Highest ranking: No. 966 (October 15, 2012)

Doubles
- Career record: 70–77
- Career titles: 2 ITF
- Highest ranking: No. 232 (November 4, 2013)

Emily Jane Harman (born June 15, 1991) is an American former professional tennis player.

Harman has won two doubles titles on the ITF Circuit in her career. On October 15, 2012, she reached her best singles ranking of world No. 966. On November 4, 2013, she peaked at No. 232 in the doubles rankings.

== Early life and college career ==
Emily Harman is a native of Petersburg, West Virginia, and attended Petersburg High School.

Harman was recruited to Syracuse University by Luke Jensen to play tennis for the Syracuse Orange for four years from 2009 to 2012. At Syracuse, she was a Four-time Big East All-Academic Team selection and was named Academic All-American (Third Team), by the College Sports Information Directors of America (CoSIDA).

Harmed joined the Geisel School of Medicine at Dartmouth in 2019, and is a staff member at Duke University School of Medicine.

== Career ==
Harman made her WTA Tour debut at the 2012 Family Circle Cup, partnering Simone Kalhorn in doubles. The pair lost their first-round match against Klaudia Jans-Ignacik and Alla Kudryavtseva. Later that year, Harman partnered Kalhorn again at the Texas Open, losing to the second seeds Irina-Camelia Begu and Alizé Cornet.

== As coach ==
Harmen coached four seasons at the West Virginia University women's tennis program as an assistant coach, from 2016 to 2019. She left the job in 2019 to join medical school.

== ITF finals ==
=== Doubles (2–4) ===
Legend $25,000 tournaments $10,000 tournaments	Finals by surface Hard (1–2) Clay (1–2)

Result	Date	Tournament	Surface	Partner	Opponents	Score
Loss	Jun 2010	Cleveland, United States	Clay	(United States) Eleanor Peters	(United States) Sanaz Marand (United States) Caitlin Whoriskey	4–6, 0–6
Loss	Feb 2013	Surprise, United States	Hard	(China) Xu Yifan	(United States) Samantha Crawford (United States) Sachia Vickery	3–6, 6–3, [7–10]
Win	Jun 2013	Buffalo, United States	Clay	(United States) Alexandra Mueller	(Japan) Sachie Ishizu (United States) Denise Starr	4–6, 6–3, [10–7]
Loss	Oct 2013	Macon, United States	Hard	(United States) Elizabeth Lumpkin	(United States) Kristi Boxx (New Zealand) Abigail Guthrie	6–3, 6–7^{(4)}, [4–10]
Loss	Sep 2014	Hilton Head, United States	Clay	(United States) Madeleine Kobelt	(Brazil) Maria Fernanda Alves (United States) Keri Wong	1–6, 6–7^{(5)}
Win	Jun 2015	Baton Rouge, United States	Hard	(United States) Samantha Crawford	(Australia) Storm Sanders (South Africa) Chanel Simmonds	7–6^{(4)}, 6–1
