= 2008 Fed Cup World Group play-offs =

Part of tennis tournament

The World Group play-offs were four ties which involved the losing nations of the World Group first round and the winning nations of the World Group II. Nations that won their play-off ties entered the 2009 World Group, while losing nations joined the 2009 World Group II.

== Israel vs. Czech Republic ==
Israel
2
Canada Stadium, Ramat HaSharon, Israel
26–27 April 2008
Acrylic hard (outdoors)

Czech Republic
3

			1	2	3
1	(Israel) (Czech Republic)	Shahar Pe'er; Petra Kvitová	6; 2	3; 6	0; 6
2	(Israel) (Czech Republic)	Tzipora Obziler; Lucie Šafářová	6; 0	3; 6	6; 4
3	(Israel) (Czech Republic)	Shahar Pe'er; Iveta Benešová	7^{8} 6^{6}	3; 6	4; 6
4	(Israel) (Czech Republic)	Tzipora Obziler; Petra Kvitová	6; 3	6; 4
5	(Israel) (Czech Republic)	Tzipora Obziler / Shahar Pe'er; Iveta Benešová / Květa Peschke	4; 6	3; 6

== Argentina vs. Germany ==
Argentina
3
Pilara Tenis Club, Buenos Aires, Argentina
26–27 April 2008
Red clay (outdoors)

Germany
2

			1	2	3
1	(Argentina) (Germany)	Gisela Dulko; Sabine Lisicki	6; 2	6; 2
2	(Argentina) (Germany)	Jorgelina Cravero; Martina Müller	1; 6	0; 6
3	(Argentina) (Germany)	Gisela Dulko; Martina Müller	6; 2	6; 4
4	(Argentina) (Germany)	Betina Jozami; Angelique Kerber	6; 3	6; 1
5	(Argentina) (Germany)	Jorgelina Cravero / Betina Jozami; Sabine Lisicki / Jasmin Wöhr	0; 6	6; 1	6^{2} 7^{7}

== Japan vs. France ==
Japan
1
Ariake Coliseum, Tokyo, Japan
26–27 April 2008
Plexipave (indoors)

France
4

			1	2	3
1	(Japan) (France)	Ayumi Morita; Amélie Mauresmo	0; 6	2; 6
2	(Japan) (France)	Ai Sugiyama; Virginie Razzano	1; 6	5; 7
3	(Japan) (France)	Ai Sugiyama; Amélie Mauresmo	1; 6	4; 6
4	(Japan) (France)	Aiko Nakamura; Virginie Razzano	4; 6	4; 6
5	(Japan) (France)	Ai Sugiyama / Ayumi Morita; Nathalie Dechy / Alizé Cornet	6; 1	6; 3

== Italy vs. Ukraine ==
Italy
3
Geovillage, Olbia, Italy
26–27 April 2008
Red clay (outdoors)

Ukraine
2

			1	2	3
1	(Italy) (Ukraine)	Francesca Schiavone; Mariya Koryttseva	3; 6	7^{7} 6^{0}	7; 5
2	(Italy) (Ukraine)	Karin Knapp; Alona Bondarenko	3; 6	3; 6
3	(Italy) (Ukraine)	Francesca Schiavone; Alona Bondarenko	7; 5	6; 3
4	(Italy) (Ukraine)	Sara Errani; Kateryna Bondarenko	6; 3	6; 2
5	(Italy) (Ukraine)	Sara Errani / Karin Knapp; Mariya Koryttseva / Tatiana Perebiynis	6; 0	6^{4} 7^{7}	3; 6

== See also ==
- Fed Cup structure
