= Bidakhavid =

Bidakhoid بيداخويد
- Village
- Qanat of Bidakhvid

- Location within Iran
- Coordinates: 31°32′37″N 53°55′08″E
- Country: Iran
- Province: Yazd
- County: Taft
- Bakhsh: Nir
- Rural District: Banadkuk

Population (2006)
  - Total: 245
- Time zone: UTC+3:30 (IRST)
  - Summer (DST): UTC+4:30 (IRDT)

Bid Akhvid (Persian: بيداخويد, also Romanized as Bīd Ākhvīd, Bīd Akhavīd, Bīdākhavīd, and Bīd Okhvīd; also known as Bīd Okhābīt and Bīda Khābīt) is a village in Banadkuk Rural District, Nir District, Taft County, Yazd Province, Iran. At the 2006 census, its population was 245, in 98 families.
