= Texas Tennis Open =

Defunct tennis tournament
- Founded: 2011
- Abolished: 2013
- Editions: 2
- Location: Grapevine, Texas; United States
- Venue: Hilton Lakes Tennis & Sports Club
- Category: International
- Surface: Hardcourt / Outdoor
- Draw: 32S / 16SQ / 16D
- Prize money: US$ 220,000
- Website: History of the event

The Texas Tennis Open was a professional tennis tournament for women. After some contradictory statements, the Women's Tennis Association (WTA) made it a late addition to the 2011 WTA Tour. It was played at the Hilton Lakes Tennis & Sports Club in Grapevine (near Dallas), Texas in the United States. It was an International level event in August during the same week (the week before the US Open) as the New Haven Open at Yale. In 2013, the event was cancelled from the WTA calendar due to economic reasons.

== Finals ==
=== Singles ===
Year	Champion	Runner-up	Score
2012	(Italy) Roberta Vinci	(Serbia) Jelena Janković	7–5, 6–3
2011	(Germany) Sabine Lisicki	(France) Aravane Rezaï	6–2, 6–1

=== Doubles ===
Year	Champions	Runners-up	Score
2012	(New Zealand) Marina Erakovic (United Kingdom) Heather Watson	(Latvia) Līga Dekmeijere (United States) Irina Falconi	6–3, 6–0
2011	(Italy) Alberta Brianti (Romania) Sorana Cîrstea	(France) Alizé Cornet (France) Pauline Parmentier	7–5, 6–3
