= Elizabeth Lumpkin =

American tennis player

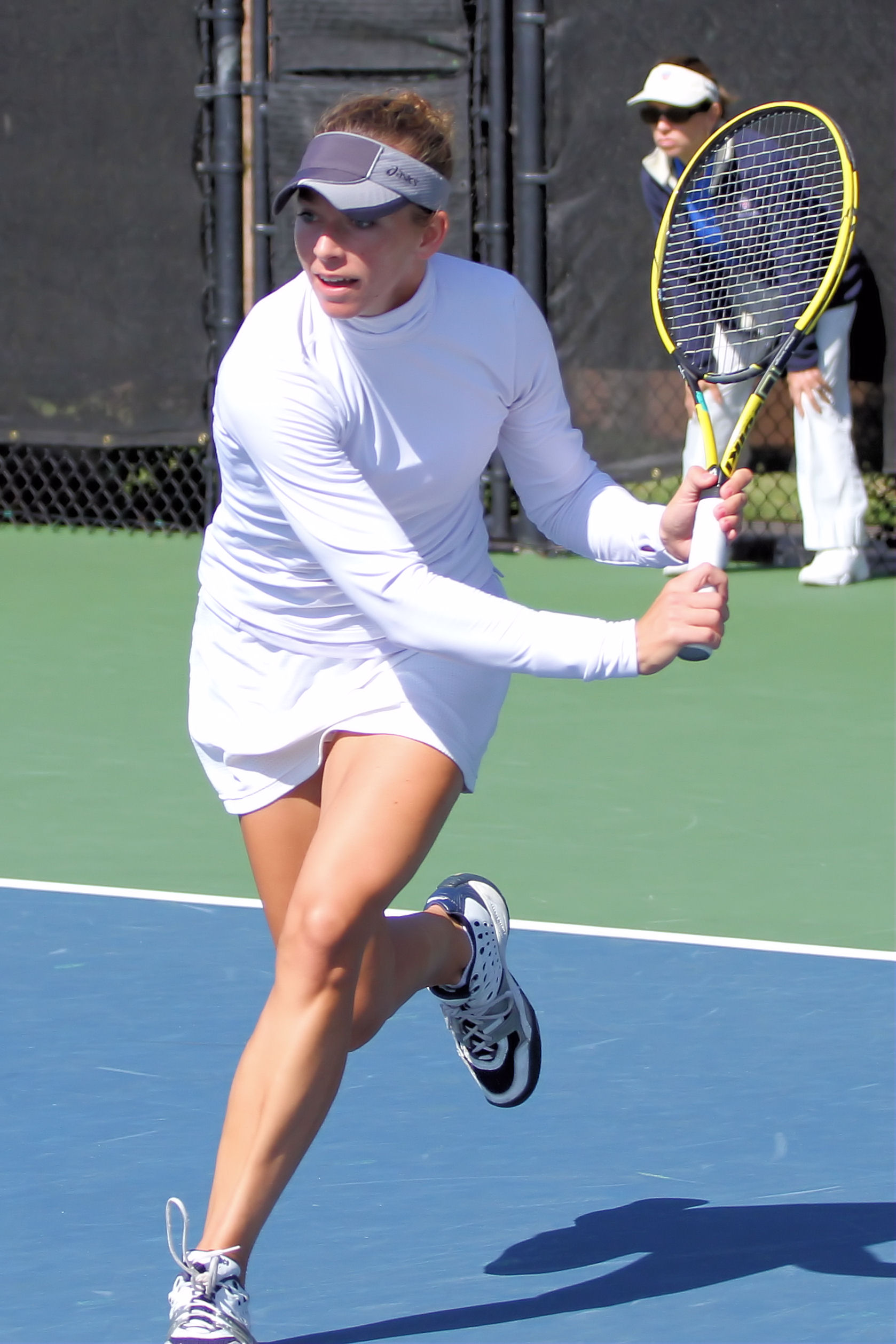
- Full name: Elizabeth Henderson Lumpkin
- Country (sports): United States
- Born: May 24, 1986 (age 40) Santa Fe, New Mexico, U.S.
- Height: 5 ft 9 in (175 cm)
- Plays: Right-handed
- Prize money: $46,904

Singles
- Career record: 92–109
- Career titles: 1 ITF
- Highest ranking: No. 443 (July 12, 2010)

Doubles
- Career record: 92–94
- Career titles: 6 ITF
- Highest ranking: No. 280 (November 8, 2010)

Elizabeth Henderson Lumpkin (born May 24, 1986) is a former professional tennis player from the United States and current head women's tennis coach at the University of Illinois Chicago.

== Career ==
Born in Santa Fe, New Mexico, Lumkpin went to Naperville Central High School in Illinois, where she won a record four successive state titles in singles. She was a Junior Fed Cup representative for the United States in 2002.

Lumpkin played collegiate tennis with the UCLA Bruins and was a member of the 2008 championship winning team, before graduating in 2009.

As a professional player, she made both of her WTA Tour main-draw appearances at the Texas Tennis Open, playing doubles in 2011 and 2012. In the 2012 edition, she and partner Yasmin Schnack lost a match tie-break in the first round to eventual champions, Marina Erakovic and Heather Watson.

Lumpkin retired from the tour in 2013. She served for six seasons as the assistant and associate women's tennis coach at the University of Oregon until being hired at UIC on Nov. 1, 2023.
