= 2011 Western & Southern Open – Men's singles =

Men's singles
- 2011 Western & Southern Open

Final
- Champion: (United Kingdom) Andy Murray
- Runner-up: (Serbia) Novak Djokovic
- Score: 6–4, 3–0 ret.

Events
Singles	men	women
Doubles	men	women
← 2010 ·	Western & Southern Open	· 2012 →

Andy Murray won the men's singles title at the 2011 Cincinnati Masters after Novak Djokovic retired from the final, with the scoreline at 6–4, 3–0. It was Murray's seventh Masters title. Djokovic's retirement in the final marked only his second defeat of the season.

Roger Federer was the two-time defending champion, but lost to Tomáš Berdych in the quarterfinals.

== Seeds ==
The top eight seeds receive a bye into the second round.

1. (Serbia) Novak Djokovic (final, retired due to sore shoulder)
2. (Spain) Rafael Nadal (quarterfinals)
3. (Switzerland) Roger Federer (quarterfinals)
4. (United Kingdom) Andy Murray (champion)
5. (Spain) David Ferrer (third round)
6. (France) Gaël Monfils (quarterfinals)
7. (United States) Mardy Fish (semifinals)
8. (Czech Republic) Tomáš Berdych (semifinals, retired due to shoulder injury)
9. (Spain) Nicolás Almagro (third round)
10. (France) Gilles Simon (quarterfinals)
11. (United States) Andy Roddick (first round)
12. (France) Richard Gasquet (third round)
13. (Russia) Mikhail Youzhny (first round)
14. (Serbia) Viktor Troicki (first round)
15. (France) Jo-Wilfried Tsonga (second round)
16. (Switzerland) Stanislas Wawrinka (first round)

== Main draw ==
=== Key ===
- Q = Qualifier
- WC = Wild card
- LL = Lucky loser
- Alt = Alternate
- SE = Special exempt
- PR = Protected ranking
- ITF = ITF entry
- JE = Junior exempt
- w/o = Walkover
- r = Retired
- d = Defaulted
- SR = Special ranking

=== Finals ===
Quarterfinals
1	(Serbia) Novak Djokovic	3	6	6
6	(France) Gaël Monfils	6	4	3
3	(Switzerland) Roger Federer	2	6^{3}
8	(Czech Republic) Tomáš Berdych	6	7^{7}
10	(France) Gilles Simon	3	3
4	(United Kingdom) Andy Murray	6	6
7	(United States) Mardy Fish	6	6
2	(Spain) Rafael Nadal	3	4

Semifinals
1	(Serbia) Novak Djokovic	7	0
8	(Czech Republic) Tomáš Berdych	5	0^{r}
4	(United Kingdom) Andy Murray	6	7^{10}
7	(United States) Mardy Fish	3	6^{8}

Final
1	(Serbia) Novak Djokovic	4	0^{r}
4	(United Kingdom) Andy Murray	6	3

=== Top half ===
==== Section 1 ====
First round
WC	(United States) R Harrison	6	6
(Argentina) JI Chela	3	3
Q	(Czech Republic) R Štěpánek	7	5	7^{7}
(United States) J Isner	5	7	6^{4}
(Kazakhstan) A Golubev	3	6	6
16	(Switzerland) S Wawrinka	6	4	1
11	(United States) A Roddick	7^{7}	5	1
(Germany) P Kohlschreiber	6^{5}	7	6
PR	(Spain) JC Ferrero	6	3	4
(Spain) F López	4	6	6
(Croatia) I Dodig	6	7^{7}
Q	(Latvia) E Gulbis	3	6^{3}

Second round
1	(Serbia) N Djokovic	6	6
WC	(United States) R Harrison	2	3
Q	(Czech Republic) R Štěpánek	6	7^{7}
(Kazakhstan) A Golubev	3	6^{2}
(Germany) P Kohlschreiber	6	6
(Spain) F López	1	4
(Croatia) I Dodig	6	3	0^{r}
6	(France) G Monfils	4	6	4

Third round
1	(Serbia) N Djokovic	6	6
Q	(Czech Republic) R Štěpánek	3	3
(Germany) P Kohlschreiber	2	2
6	(France) G Monfils	6	6

Quarterfinals
1	(Serbia) N Djokovic	3	6	6
6	(France) G Monfils	6	4	3

==== Section 2 ====
First round
(Argentina) JM del Potro	4
(Italy) A Seppi	1^{r}
(Cyprus) M Baghdatis	6	3	2
WC	(United States) J Blake	3	6	6
(Italy) F Fognini	6	6
14	(Serbia) V Troicki	4	1
9	(Spain) N Almagro	7^{7}	6
(Spain) A Montañés	6^{5}	4
PR	(Croatia) I Karlović	6	6
(Germany) F Mayer	1	3
PR	(Germany) T Haas	7^{7}	4	3
(Argentina) J Mónaco	6^{5}	6	6

Second round
3	(Switzerland) R Federer	6	7
(Argentina) JM del Potro	3	5
WC	(United States) J Blake	6	6
(Italy) F Fognini	4	2
9	(Spain) N Almagro	6	5	7^{7}
PR	(Croatia) I Karlović	3	7	6^{2}
(Argentina) J Mónaco	6^{2}	0
8	(Czech Republic) T Berdych	7^{7}	6

Third round
3	(Switzerland) R Federer	6	6
WC	(United States) J Blake	4	1
9	(Spain) N Almagro	2	2
8	(Czech Republic) T Berdych	6	6

Quarterfinals
3	(Switzerland) R Federer	2	6^{3}
8	(Czech Republic) T Berdych	6	7^{7}

=== Bottom half ===
==== Section 3 ====
First round
Q	(Turkey) M İlhan	3	5
WC	(Bulgaria) G Dimitrov	6	7
(Serbia) J Tipsarević	6	3	7^{7}
Q	(France) É Roger-Vasselin	0	6	6^{5}
(Austria) J Melzer	7^{7}	3	5
10	(France) G Simon	6^{3}	6	7
15	(France) J-W Tsonga	6	6
(Croatia) M Čilić	3	4
Q	(United States) A Bogomolov Jr.	6	6
WC	(United States) R Ginepri	4	3
Q	(Japan) K Nishikori	4	4
(Argentina) D Nalbandian	6	6

Second round
5	(Spain) D Ferrer	4	6	7
WC	(Bulgaria) G Dimitrov	6	1	5
(Serbia) J Tipsarević	7^{7}	2	3
10	(France) G Simon	6^{3}	6	6
15	(France) J-W Tsonga	3	4
Q	(United States) A Bogomolov Jr.	6	6
(Argentina) D Nalbandian	4	1
4	(United Kingdom) A Murray	6	6

Third round
5	(Spain) D Ferrer	4	7^{7}	4
10	(France) G Simon	6	6^{3}	6
Q	(United States) A Bogomolov Jr.	2	5
4	(United Kingdom) A Murray	6	7

Quarterfinals
10	(France) G Simon	3	3
4	(United Kingdom) A Murray	6	6

==== Section 4 ====
First round
(Russia) N Davydenko	6	7^{7}
(Ukraine) S Stakhovsky	2	6^{5}
(Belgium) X Malisse	3	6^{6}
(South Africa) K Anderson	6	7^{8}
(Ukraine) A Dolgopolov	1	6^{4}
12	(France) R Gasquet	6	7^{7}
13	(Russia) M Youzhny	5	6	6^{4}
(France) M Llodra	7	3	7^{7}
(Brazil) T Bellucci	3	6^{4}
(Spain) F Verdasco	6	7^{7}
(Spain) G García López	3	0^{r}
Q	(France) J Benneteau	6	1

Second round
7	(United States) M Fish	6	6
(Russia) N Davydenko	0	2
(South Africa) K Anderson	6^{4}	4
12	(France) R Gasquet	7^{7}	6
(France) M Llodra	4	4
(Spain) F Verdasco	6	6
Q	(France) J Benneteau	4	5
2	(Spain) R Nadal	6	7

Third round
7	(United States) M Fish	7	7
12	(France) R Gasquet	5	5
(Spain) F Verdasco	6^{5}	7^{7}	6^{9}
2	(Spain) R Nadal	7^{7}	6^{4}	7^{11}

Quarterfinals
7	(United States) M Fish	6	6
2	(Spain) R Nadal	3	4
