= 2011 Western & Southern Open – Women's singles =

Women's singles
- 2011 Western & Southern Open

Final
- Champion: (Russia) Maria Sharapova
- Runner-up: (Serbia) Jelena Janković
- Score: 4–6, 7–6^{(7–3)}, 6–3

Details
- Draw: 56
- Seeds: 16

Events
Singles	men	women
Doubles	men	women
← 2010 ·	Western & Southern Open	· 2012 →

Maria Sharapova defeated Jelena Janković in the final, 4–6, 7–6^{(7–3)}, 6–3 to win the women's singles tennis title at the 2011 Cincinnati Masters.

Kim Clijsters was the reigning champion, but withdrew due to an abdominal injury.

== Seeds ==
The top eight seeds received a bye into the second round.

1. (Denmark) Caroline Wozniacki (second round)
2. (Russia) Vera Zvonareva (semifinals)
3. (Belarus) Victoria Azarenka (withdrew due to a right hand injury)
4. (Russia) Maria Sharapova (champion)
5. (China) Li Na (third round)
6. (Czech Republic) Petra Kvitová (third round)
7. (Italy) Francesca Schiavone (third round)
8. (France) Marion Bartoli (third round)
9. (Germany) Andrea Petkovic (semifinals)
10. (Australia) Samantha Stosur (quarterfinals)
11. (Poland) Agnieszka Radwańska (withdrew due to a right shoulder injury)
12. (Russia) Anastasia Pavlyuchenkova (first round)
13. (Serbia) Jelena Janković (final)
14. (Russia) Svetlana Kuznetsova (third round)
15. (Serbia) Ana Ivanovic (second round)
16. (China) Peng Shuai (quarterfinals, withdrew due to a left hip injury)
17. (Belgium) Yanina Wickmayer (second round)

== Main draw ==
=== Key ===
- Q = Qualifier
- WC = Wild card
- LL = Lucky loser
- Alt = Alternate
- SE = Special exempt
- PR = Protected ranking
- ITF = ITF entry
- JE = Junior exempt
- w/o = Walkover
- r = Retired
- d = Defaulted
- SR = Special ranking

=== Finals ===
Quarterfinals
(Russia) Nadia Petrova	5	1
9	(Germany) Andrea Petkovic	7	6
16	(China) Peng Shuai
13	(Serbia) Jelena Janković	w/o
10	(Australia) Samantha Stosur	3	2
4/WC	(Russia) Maria Sharapova	6	6
(Slovakia) Daniela Hantuchová	3	6^{6}
2	(Russia) Vera Zvonareva	6	7^{8}

Semifinals
9	(Germany) Andrea Petkovic	6^{4}	1
13	(Serbia) Jelena Janković	7^{7}	6
4/WC	(Russia) Maria Sharapova	2	6	6
2	(Russia) Vera Zvonareva	6	3	3

Final
13	(Serbia) Jelena Janković	6	6^{3}	3
4/WC	(Russia) Maria Sharapova	4	7^{7}	6

=== Top half ===
==== Section 1 ====
First round
WC	(United States) C McHale	7	4	6
(Bulgaria) T Pironkova	5	6	1
(Italy) R Vinci	3	6	4
(Russia) N Petrova	6	0	6
Q	(United States) A Glatch	0	2
15	(Serbia) A Ivanovic	6	6
9	(Germany) A Petkovic	5	7^{7}	6
(Australia) J Gajdošová	7	6^{5}	2
LL	(Sweden) S Arvidsson	0	7^{7}	6
Q	(Romania) M Niculescu	6	6^{4}	3
(Canada) R Marino	5	2
Q	(South Africa) C Scheepers	7	6

Second round
1	(Denmark) C Wozniacki	4	5
WC	(United States) C McHale	6	7
(Russia) N Petrova	6	7^{7}
15	(Serbia) A Ivanovic	3	6^{4}
9	(Germany) A Petkovic	6	6
LL	(Sweden) S Arvidsson	2	4
Q	(South Africa) C Scheepers	6^{3}	3
6	(Czech Republic) P Kvitová	7^{7}	6

Third round
WC	(United States) C McHale	3	3
(Russia) N Petrova	6	6
9	(Germany) A Petkovic	6	6
6	(Czech Republic) P Kvitová	3	3

Quarterfinals
(Russia) N Petrova	5	1
9	(Germany) A Petkovic	7	6

==== Section 2 ====
First round
(Germany) S Lisicki	4	6^{4}
(Israel) S Pe'er	6	7^{7}
WC	(United States) S Stephens	1	5
(Italy) S Errani	6	7
(Argentina) G Dulko	3	6	4
16	(China) S Peng	6	4	6
13	(Serbia) J Janković	6	6
(Czech Republic) I Benešová	0	3
(Germany) J Görges	2	6	4
Q	(China) J Zheng	6	1	6
Q	(China) S Zhang	6^{2}	3
(Russia) M Kirilenko	7^{7}	6

Second round
LL	(France) P Parmentier	2	3
(Israel) S Pe'er	6	6
(Italy) S Errani	2	4
16	(China) S Peng	6	6
13	(Serbia) J Janković	4	6	6
Q	(China) J Zheng	6	3	1
(Russia) M Kirilenko	5	6	4
7	(Italy) F Schiavone	7	3	6

Third round
(Israel) S Pe'er	3	2
16	(China) S Peng	6	6
13	(Serbia) J Janković	6	5	6
7	(Italy) F Schiavone	3	7	4

Quarterfinals
16	(China) S Peng
13	(Serbia) J Janković	w/o

=== Bottom half ===
==== Section 3 ====
First round
(Czech Republic) L Šafářová	6	6
(Czech Republic) K Zakopalová	2	2
(Czech Republic) L Hradecká	3	6^{5}
(United States) S Williams	6	7^{7}
Q	(Greece) E Daniilidou	3	1
10	(Australia) S Stosur	6	6
14	(Russia) S Kuznetsova	6	6
Q	(United States) J Craybas	3	4
Q	(Czech Republic) P Cetkovská	2	6	6
(Spain) A Medina Garrigues	6	2	2
Q	(Australia) A Rodionova	6	6
WC	(Slovenia) P Hercog	0	0

Second round
5	(China) N Li	6	6
(Czech Republic) L Šafářová	3	4
(United States) S Williams
10	(Australia) S Stosur	w/o
14	(Russia) S Kuznetsova	4	6	6
Q	(Czech Republic) P Cetkovská	6	3	4
Q	(Australia) A Rodionova	1	3
4/WC	(Russia) M Sharapova	6	6

Third round
5	(China) N Li	4	6	4
10	(Australia) S Stosur	6	3	6
14	(Russia) S Kuznetsova	2	3
4/WC	(Russia) M Sharapova	6	6

Quarterfinals
10	(Australia) S Stosur	3	2
4/WC	(Russia) M Sharapova	6	6

==== Section 4 ====
First round
(Japan) A Morita	2	6	2
PR	(Ukraine) A Bondarenko	6	4	6
(Slovakia) D Hantuchová	6	4
(Spain) L Domínguez Lino	3	1^{r}
(Italy) F Pennetta	2	6	6
12	(Russia) A Pavlyuchenkova	6	3	3
17	(Belgium) Y Wickmayer	6	6
Q	(Serbia) B Jovanovski	3	4
(Russia) E Vesnina	6	6^{5}	0
Q	(Croatia) P Martić	3	7^{7}	6
LL	(Spain) MJ Martínez Sánchez	5	3
(Russia) E Makarova	7	6

Second round
8	(France) M Bartoli	6	6
PR	(Ukraine) A Bondarenko	1	2
(Slovakia) D Hantuchová	6	6
(Italy) F Pennetta	3	4
17	(Belgium) Y Wickmayer	6	2	2
Q	(Croatia) P Martić	3	6	6
(Russia) E Makarova	3	0
2	(Russia) V Zvonareva	6	6

Third round
8	(France) M Bartoli	3	7	3
(Slovakia) D Hantuchová	6	5	6
Q	(Croatia) P Martić	2	2
2	(Russia) V Zvonareva	6	6

Quarterfinals
(Slovakia) D Hantuchová	3	6^{6}
2	(Russia) V Zvonareva	6	7^{8}
