= 2012 Western & Southern Open – Women's doubles =

Women's doubles
- 2012 Western & Southern Open

Final
- Champion: (Czech Republic) Andrea Hlaváčková (Czech Republic) Lucie Hradecká
- Runner-up: (Slovenia) Katarina Srebotnik (China) Zheng Jie
- Score: 6–1, 6–3

Details
- Seeds: 8

Events
Singles	men	women
Doubles	men	women
← 2011 ·	Western & Southern Open	· 2013 →

Vania King and Yaroslava Shvedova were the defending champions, but withdrew because of Shvedova's heat illness.
Andrea Hlaváčková and Lucie Hradecká won the title after defeating Katarina Srebotnik and Zheng Jie 6–1, 6–3 in the final.

== Seeds ==
The top four seeds receive a bye into the second round.

1. (United States) Liezel Huber / (United States) Lisa Raymond (second round)
2. (Italy) Sara Errani / (Italy) Roberta Vinci (quarterfinals)
3. (United States) Vania King / (Kazakhstan) Yaroslava Shvedova (withdrew because of Shvedova's heat illness)
4. (Russia) Maria Kirilenko / (Russia) Nadia Petrova (withdrew because of Petrova's dizziness)
5. (Czech Republic) Andrea Hlaváčková / (Czech Republic) Lucie Hradecká (champions)
6. (Spain) Nuria Llagostera Vives / (Spain) María José Martínez Sánchez (semifinals)
7. (United States) Raquel Kops-Jones / (United States) Abigail Spears (second round)
8. (Slovenia) Katarina Srebotnik / (China) Zheng Jie (final)

== Draw ==
=== Key ===
- Q = Qualifier
- WC = Wild card
- LL = Lucky loser
- Alt = Alternate
- SE = Special exempt
- PR = Protected ranking
- ITF = ITF entry
- JE = Junior exempt
- w/o = Walkover
- r = Retired
- d = Defaulted
- SR = Special ranking

=== Finals ===
Semifinals
8	(Slovenia) Katarina Srebotnik (China) Zheng Jie	6	6
6	(Spain) Nuria Llagostera Vives (Spain) María José Martínez Sánchez	4	3
Alt	(Croatia) Darija Jurak (Hungary) Katalin Marosi	4	6	[8]
5	(Czech Republic) Andrea Hlaváčková (Czech Republic) Lucie Hradecká	6	3	[10]

Final
8	(Slovenia) Katarina Srebotnik (China) Zheng Jie	1	3
5	(Czech Republic) Andrea Hlaváčková (Czech Republic) Lucie Hradecká	6	6

=== Top half ===
First round
WC	(Serbia) J Janković (Israel) S Pe'er	1	3
WC	(Greece) E Daniilidou (China) S Peng	6	6
(Russia) E Makarova (Georgia (country)) A Tatishvili	2	6	[10]
(United States) B Mattek-Sands (India) S Mirza	6	1	[8]
(Australia) C Dellacqua (Slovenia) A Klepač	3	3
8	(Slovenia) K Srebotnik (China) J Zheng	6	6
(South Africa) N Grandin (Czech Republic) V Uhlířová	7^{7}	6
(Romania) I-C Begu (Spain) A Medina Garrigues	6^{5}	1
(Russia) V Dushevina (Argentina) P Suárez	6	6
(Chinese Taipei) C-j Chuang (Slovakia) J Husárová	3	4
(Belarus) O Govortsova (Russia) A Kudryavtseva	4	6	[3]
6	(Spain) N Llagostera Vives (Spain) MJ Martínez Sánchez	6	3	[10]

Second round
1	(United States) L Huber (United States) L Raymond	4	4
WC	(Greece) E Daniilidou (China) S Peng	6	6
(Russia) E Makarova (Georgia (country)) A Tatishvili	6	4	[9]
8	(Slovenia) K Srebotnik (China) J Zheng	3	6	[11]
Alt	(Sweden) S Arvidsson (United States) J Craybas	1	6^{6}
(South Africa) N Grandin (Czech Republic) V Uhlířová	6	7^{8}
(Russia) V Dushevina (Argentina) P Suárez	6	3	[9]
6	(Spain) N Llagostera Vives (Spain) MJ Martínez Sánchez	2	6	[11]

Quarterfinals
WC	(Greece) E Daniilidou (China) S Peng	5^{r}
8	(Slovenia) K Srebotnik (China) J Zheng	7
(South Africa) N Grandin (Czech Republic) V Uhlířová	1	2
6	(Spain) N Llagostera Vives (Spain) MJ Martínez Sánchez	6	6

Semifinals
8	(Slovenia) K Srebotnik (China) J Zheng	6	6
6	(Spain) N Llagostera Vives (Spain) MJ Martínez Sánchez	4	3

=== Bottom half ===
First round
7	(United States) R Kops-Jones (United States) A Spears	6	6
WC	(United States) A Glatch (United States) M Oudin	2	2
(Poland) A Rosolska (Poland) K Jans-Ignacik	3	4
WC	(United States) V Lepchenko (United States) S Stephens	6	6
(Australia) J Gajdošová (Czech Republic) K Zakopalová	6	1	[4]
(Slovakia) D Cibulková (Slovakia) D Hantuchová	4	6	[10]
5	(Czech Republic) A Hlaváčková (Czech Republic) L Hradecká	7^{7}	7^{7}
(Czech Republic) I Benešová (Czech Republic) B Záhlavová-Strýcová	6^{1}	6^{5}
(Germany) J Görges (Czech Republic) K Peschke	6	3	[16]
(Chinese Taipei) H-c Chan (Chinese Taipei) Y-j Chan	4	6	[14]
(Argentina) G Dulko (Italy) F Schiavone	4	2
(Australia) A Rodionova (Kazakhstan) G Voskoboeva	6	6

Second round
7	(United States) R Kops-Jones (United States) A Spears	6	4	[6]
WC	(United States) V Lepchenko (United States) S Stephens	3	6	[10]
(Slovakia) D Cibulková (Slovakia) D Hantuchová
Alt	(Croatia) D Jurak (Hungary) K Marosi	w/o
5	(Czech Republic) A Hlaváčková (Czech Republic) L Hradecká	6	4	[10]
(Germany) J Görges (Czech Republic) K Peschke	1	6	[6]
(Australia) A Rodionova (Kazakhstan) G Voskoboeva	4	4
2	(Italy) S Errani (Italy) R Vinci	6	6

Quarterfinals
WC	(United States) V Lepchenko (United States) S Stephens	6	5	[8]
Alt	(Croatia) D Jurak (Hungary) K Marosi	4	7	[10]
5	(Czech Republic) A Hlaváčková (Czech Republic) L Hradecká	6	3	[10]
2	(Italy) S Errani (Italy) R Vinci	3	6	[3]

Semifinals
Alt	(Croatia) D Jurak (Hungary) K Marosi	4	6	[8]
5	(Czech Republic) A Hlaváčková (Czech Republic) L Hradecká	6	3	[10]
