= Andrea Sestini Hlaváčková =

Czech tennis player (born 1986)

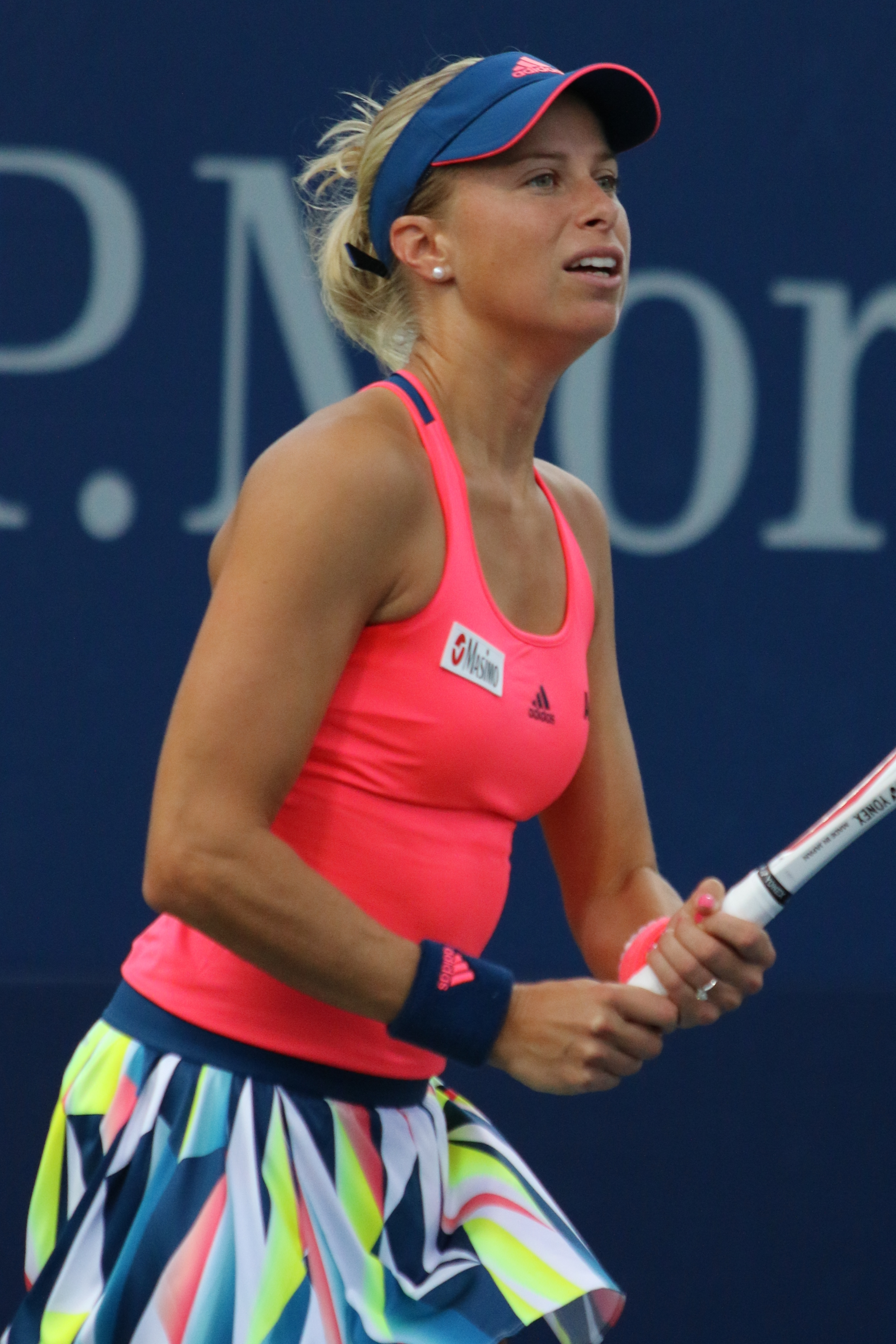
- Hlaváčková at the 2016 US Open
- Country (sports): Czech Republic
- Born: 10 August 1986 (age 40) Plzeň, Czechoslovakia (now Czech Republic)
- Height: 1.74 m (5 ft 9 in)
- Turned pro: 2004
- Retired: 2022
- Plays: Right-handed (two-handed backhand)
- Prize money: US$ 5,263,092
- Official website: andreahlavackova.com

Singles
- Career record: 359–317
- Career titles: 8 ITF
- Highest ranking: No. 58 (10 September 2012)

Grand Slam singles results
- Australian Open: 2R (2011)
- French Open: 1R (2011, 2013, 2015)
- Wimbledon: 2R (2010, 2011, 2012)
- US Open: 4R (2012)

Doubles
- Career record: 522–246
- Career titles: 27 WTA, 19 ITF
- Highest ranking: No. 3 (22 October 2012)

Grand Slam doubles results
- Australian Open: F (2016, 2017)
- French Open: W (2011)
- Wimbledon: F (2012)
- US Open: W (2013)

Other doubles tournaments
- Tour Finals: W (2017)
- Olympic Games: F (2012)

Grand Slam mixed doubles results
- Australian Open: QF (2012)
- French Open: SF (2016, 2017)
- Wimbledon: 3R (2014)
- US Open: W (2013)

Team competitions
- Fed Cup: W 2012, 2014; Record 4–2
Medal record
Olympic Games
Silver medal – second place	2012 London	Doubles

Andrea Sestini Hlaváčková (née Hlaváčková; Czech pronunciation: [ˈandrɛa ˈɦlavaːtʃkovaː]; born 10 August 1986) is a Czech former professional tennis player.

She is a three-time Grand Slam champion in doubles, having won the 2011 French Open and 2013 US Open in women's doubles alongside Lucie Hradecká, as well as the 2013 US Open in mixed doubles with Max Mirnyi. Sestini Hlaváčková also finished runner-up in women's doubles at the Wimbledon Championships and US Open in 2012, and the Australian Open in 2016 and 2017. She reached her highest doubles ranking of world No. 3 in October 2012, and won 27 doubles titles on the WTA Tour, including the 2017 WTA Finals with Tímea Babos, and three at Premier Mandatory/Premier 5 level.

In singles, Sestini Hlaváčková reached a career-high ranking of world No. 58 in September 2012, and one WTA Tour final in Gastein in 2013. Her best major singles result came at the 2012 US Open, reaching the fourth round. Hlaváčková was part of the Czech team which won the Fed Cup in 2012 and 2014, also taking part in the 2013 tournament. She also won a silver medal in doubles at the 2012 London Olympics alongside Hradecká.

== Personal life ==
Hlaváčková married former Italian tennis player and WTA employee, Fabrizio Sestini, in July 2017. They have two daughters, Isabella (born 2019) and Bea (born 2024). Hlaváčková started competing under her new name "Andrea Sestini Hlaváčková" following the end of the 2017 season.

Her older sister, Jana Hlaváčková, was also a professional tennis player.

== Tennis career ==
Hlaváčková started playing tennis at the age of three.

Hlaváčková was the top-ranked girls doubles player at the end of 2003. This was the last year in which there were separate junior singles and doubles rankings. Her highest girls singles ranking was No. 5, on 5 January 2004. In her U18-junior career she won three singles titles: a Grade 2 at Hostivar (September 2002), a Grade 1 at Frankfurt (June 2003), and a Grade 3 at Plzeň (July 2004), and 15 doubles titles.

Hlaváčková won her first International Tennis Federation (ITF) doubles title in 2003, on 19 October, with compatriot Tereza Szafnerová. The team defeated Lucie Kriegsmannová and Pavlína Šlitrová in the final.

In May 2006, Hlaváčková won her first ITF singles title at a 25k in Tenerife, Spain, when she beat Monique Adamczak in the final. She won her first ITF doubles title of 2006 in Jersey, Channel Islands with Matea Mezak. Hlaváčková and Renata Voráčová won a title in Fontanafredda, Italy over Daniela and Sandra Klemenschits. In late 2006, she won three straight doubles events that she entered. All of them came with compatriot Nikola Fraňková in November and December.

In 2007, Hlaváčková won her first WTA doubles title, partnered with compatriot Petra Cetkovská. Hlaváčková and Sandra Klösel of Germany entered the 2007 Wimbledon women's doubles competition main draw as lucky losers. The team defeated Klaudia Jans and Alicja Rosolska in the first round, but fell to Michaëlla Krajicek and Agnieszka Radwańska in the second. The Czech team won the title in their home country, at the Prague Open. They defeated Ji Chunmei and Sun Shengnan. On the ITF Women's Circuit, Hlaváčková won four doubles titles. Her first of the year came in March in Tenerife, Spain, along with Margit Rüütel. Her next two titles came in La Palma, Spain and Calvià, Spain, both with Cetkovská. Hlaváčková won her fourth title with Lucie Hradecká in Jersey, Great Britain to retain her crown.

She made a successful WTA Tour partnership with Lucie Hradecká, and teamed with her to win the 2008 ECM Prague Open in their home country. To win, the pair defeated Jill Craybas and Michaëlla Krajicek in the final. Their second title of the year then came at the 2008 Gastein Ladies, where they beat Sesil Karatantcheva and Nataša Zorić in the final.

In August 2009, Hlaváčková won her second ITF singles title at the 25k event in Bad Saulgau, Germany.

She won three 25k singles titles in 2010: in Sutton, England in February, in Les Contamines-Montjoie, France in July and in Vigo, Spain in August.

Hlaváčková won her first Grand Slam title in doubles with Hradecká at the 2011 French Open, beating Sania Mirza and Elena Vesnina in the final. She won also two ITF singles titles in 2011: a 50k in the Bronx in August, and a 25k in Clermont-Ferrand in October.

On 5 August 2012, she won the silver medal at the London Olympics along with her women's doubles partner Hradecká. At the US Open, she reached the fourth round. She upset Maria Kirilenko in the third round, but was defeated in the round of 16 by fourth seed and eventual champion, Serena Williams, 6–0, 6–0.

At the 2013 US Open, Hlaváčková won both the mixed-doubles title paired with Max Mirnyi and the women's doubles title with Lucie Hradecká.

Hlaváčková won her eighth ITF singles title (25k) in Plzeň, Czech Republic in August 2015.

On 13 August 2016, at the Rio Summer Olympics, Hlaváčková's left eye was hit by a ball, from an overhead volley from Martina Hingis.

On 17 June 2022, she announced her official retirement after the 2022 Prague Open.

== Performance timelines ==
Key
W	F	SF	QF	#R	RR	Q#	P#	DNQ	A	Z#	PO	G	S	B	NMS	NTI	P	NH

(W) winner; (F) finalist; (SF) semifinalist; (QF) quarterfinalist; (#R) rounds 4, 3, 2, 1; (RR) round-robin stage; (Q#) qualification round; (P#) preliminary round; (DNQ) did not qualify; (A) absent; (Z#) Davis/Fed Cup Zonal Group (with number indication) or (PO) play-off; (G) gold, (S) silver or (B) bronze Olympic/Paralympic medal; (NMS) not a Masters tournament; (NTI) not a Tier I tournament; (P) postponed; (NH) not held; (SR) strike rate (events won / competed); (W–L) win–loss record.

Only main-draw results in WTA Tour, Grand Slam tournaments, Fed Cup / Billie Jean King Cup and Olympic Games are included in win–loss records.

=== Singles ===
Tournament	2005	2006	2007	2008	2009	2010	2011	2012	2013	2014	2015	2016	2017	2018	SR	W–L	Win%
Grand Slam tournaments
Australian Open	A	A	A	A	A	Q2	2R	1R	1R	Q2	A	Q1	A	A	0 / 3	1–3	25%
French Open	A	A	Q1	A	A	Q2	1R	Q2	1R	Q1	1R	Q2	A	A	0 / 3	0–3	0%
Wimbledon	A	A	Q1	A	A	2R	2R	2R	1R	1R	Q1	Q3	A	A	0 / 5	3–5	38%
US Open	A	Q1	Q1	A	Q2	Q1	Q3	4R	Q3	Q2	Q1	A	A	A	0 / 1	3–1	75%
Win–loss	0–0	0–0	0–0	0–0	0–0	1–1	2–3	4–3	0–3	0–1	0–1	0–0	0–0	0–0	0 / 12	7–12	37%
National representation
Billie Jean King Cup (Note: Formerly known as Fed Cup until 2020.)	A	A	A	A	A	A	A	W	SF	W	A	A	A	A	2 / 3	0–1	0%
WTA Premier Mandatory & 5 tournaments
Dubai / Qatar Open (Note: The first Premier 5 event of the year has switched back and forth between the Dubai Tennis Championships and the Qatar Ladies Open since 2009. Dubai was classified as a Premier 5 event from 2009 to 2011 before being succeeded by Doha for the 2012–2014 period. In 2015, Dubai regained its Premier 5 status while Doha was demoted to Premier status. The Premier 5 tournaments were reclassified as WTA 1000 tournaments in 2021.)	Not Tier I			A	A	A	A	A	1R	A	A	Q2	Q1	A	0 / 1	0–1	0%
Indian Wells Open	A	A	A	A	A	Q1	Q2	Q2	1R	Q1	Q1	A	A	A	0 / 1	0–1	0%
Miami Open	A	A	A	A	A	A	Q1	Q2	1R	Q1	A	A	A	A	0 / 1	0–1	0%
Madrid Open	Not Tier I				A	A	A	2R	Q1	A	A	A	A	A	0 / 1	1–1	50%
Italian Open	A	A	A	A	A	A	A	1R	1R	A	A	A	A	A	0 / 2	0–2	0%
Canadian Open	A	A	A	A	A	Q1	A	A	A	Q1	A	A	A	Q2	0 / 0	0–0	–
Cincinnati Open	not Tier I				A	A	A	3R	Q1	Q1	A	A	A	A	0 / 1	2–1	67%
Pan Pacific / Wuhan Open (Note: In 2014, the Pan Pacific Open was downgraded to a Premier event and replaced by the Wuhan Open. The Premier 5 tournaments were reclassified as WTA 1000 tournaments in 2021.)	A	A	A	A	A	A	A	1R	A	A	Q1	A	A	A	0 / 1	0–1	0%
Career statistics
Tournaments	1	0	1	0	0	3	11	12	17	8	4	3	2	1	Career total: 63		
Titles	0	0	0	0	0	0	0	0	0	0	0	0	0	0	Career total: 0		
Finals	0	0	0	0	0	0	0	0	1	0	0	0	0	0	Career total: 1		
Overall Win–Loss	0–1	0–0	1–1	0–0	0–0	1–3	6–11	10–13	8–17	5–8	3–4	1–3	1–2	0–1	0 / 63	36–64	36%
Year-end ranking (Note: 2003: WTA ranking – 686, 2004: WTA ranking – 443.)	341	226	238	227	158	106	112	65	134	169	155	274	473	721	$5,263,092		

=== Doubles ===
Tournament	2006	2007	2008	2009	2010	2011	2012	2013	2014	2015	2016	2017	2018	SR	W–L	Win%
Grand Slam tournaments
Australian Open	A	A	A	2R	3R	2R	SF	2R	QF	3R	F	F	QF	0 / 10	27–10	73%
French Open	A	A	A	1R	3R	W	SF	SF	1R	SF	QF	2R	SF	1 / 10	28–9	76%
Wimbledon	A	2R	1R	1R	2R	1R	F	QF	SF	2R	3R	3R	3R	0 / 12	21–12	64%
US Open	A	A	A	2R	1R	QF	F	W	QF	3R	3R	QF	3R	1 / 10	27–9	75%
Win–loss	0–0	1–1	0–1	2–4	5–4	10–3	18–4	14–3	10–4	9–4	12–4	11–4	11–4	2 / 42	103–40	72%
Year-end championships
WTA Finals (Note: Formerly known as WTA Tour Championships until 2014.)	did not qualify						F	DNQ		SF	QF	W	SF	1 / 5	6–6	50%
National representation
Summer Olympics	not held		A	not held			S	not held			4th	not held		0 / 2	7–3	70%
WTA Premier Mandatory & 5 tournaments
Dubai / Qatar Open	not Tier I		A	A	A	A	A	QF	1R	A	1R	F	2R	0 / 5	7–5	58%
Indian Wells Open	A	A	A	A	2R	1R	SF	2R	1R	2R	QF	2R	QF	0 / 9	11–9	55%
Miami Open	A	A	A	A	1R	1R	1R	1R	1R	SF	QF	SF	1R	0 / 9	8–9	47%
Madrid Open	not held			A	A	A	2R	2R	A	1R	QF	F	SF	0 / 6	8–6	57%
Italian Open	A	A	A	A	2R	A	A	QF	A	2R	SF	SF	F	0 / 6	11–6	65%
Canadian Open	A	A	A	A	2R	A	A	A	2R	1R	A	1R	1R	0 / 5	2–5	29%
Cincinnati Open	not Tier I			A	A	2R	W	2R	SF	1R	A	QF	QF	1 / 7	12–6	67%
Pan Pacific / Wuhan Open	A	A	A	A	A	A	A	A	SF	SF	2R	A	F	0 / 4	8–4	67%
China Open	not Tier I			A	A	A	A	A	W	QF	1R	F	W	2 / 5	14–3	82%
Career statistics
	2006	2007	2008	2009	2010	2011	2012	2013	2014	2015	2016	2017	2018	SR	W–L	Win%
Tournament	1	3	7	10	14	19	17	16	17	20	22	25	24	Career total: 195		
Titles	0	1	2	1	1	3	4	2	1	0	4	6	2	Career total: 27		
Finals	0	1	2	1	1	5	9	5	2	3	5	10	6	Career total: 50		
Overall win–loss	1–1	5–2	12–5	14–9	17–13	30–16	48–12	33–14	31–16	33–22	41–19	60–19	43–22	27 / 195	368–170	68%
Year-end ranking (Note: 2004: WTA ranking – 256, 2005: WTA ranking – 543.)	236	99	71	59	45	14	3	11	15	20	9	5	9			

== Grand Slam tournament finals ==
=== Doubles: 6 (2 titles, 4 runner-ups) ===
Result	Year	Tournament	Surface	Partner	Opponents	Score
Win	2011	French Open	Clay	(Czech Republic) Lucie Hradecká	(India) Sania Mirza (Russia) Elena Vesnina	6–4, 6–3
Loss	2012	Wimbledon	Grass	(Czech Republic) Lucie Hradecká	(United States) Serena Williams (United States) Venus Williams	5–7, 4–6
Loss	2012	US Open	Hard	(Czech Republic) Lucie Hradecká	(Italy) Sara Errani (Italy) Roberta Vinci	4–6, 2–6
Win	2013	US Open	Hard	(Czech Republic) Lucie Hradecká	(Australia) Ashleigh Barty (Australia) Casey Dellacqua	6–7 ^{(4–7)}, 6–1, 6–4
Loss	2016	Australian Open	Hard	(Czech Republic) Lucie Hradecká	(Switzerland) Martina Hingis (India) Sania Mirza	6–7^{(2–7)}, 3–6
Loss	2017	Australian Open	Hard	(China) Peng Shuai	(United States) Bethanie Mattek-Sands (Czech Republic) Lucie Šafářová	7–6^{(7–4)}, 3–6, 3–6

=== Mixed doubles: 1 (title) ===
Result	Year	Tournament	Surface	Partner	Opponents	Score
Win	2013	US Open	Hard	(Belarus) Max Mirnyi	(United States) Abigail Spears (Mexico) Santiago González	7–6^{(7–5)}, 6–3

== Other significant finals ==
=== Year-end championships ===
==== Doubles: 2 (1 title, 1 runner-up) ====
Result	Year	Tournament	Surface	Partner	Opponents	Score
Loss	2012	WTA Finals, Turkey	Hard (i)	(Czech Republic) Lucie Hradecká	(Russia) Maria Kirilenko (Russia) Nadia Petrova	1–6, 4–6
Win	2017	WTA Finals, Singapore	Hard (i)	(Hungary) Tímea Babos	(Netherlands) Kiki Bertens (Sweden) Johanna Larsson	4–6, 6–4, [10–5]

=== WTA Premier Mandatory & 5 tournaments ===
==== Doubles: 8 (3 titles, 5 runner-ups) ====
Result	Year	Tournament	Surface	Partner	Opponents	Score
Win	2012	Cincinnati Open	Hard	(Czech Republic) Lucie Hradecká	(Slovenia) Katarina Srebotnik (China) Zheng Jie	6–1, 6–3
Win	2014	China Open	Hard	(China) Peng Shuai	(Zimbabwe) Cara Black (India) Sania Mirza	6–4, 6–4
Loss	2017	Dubai Championships	Hard	(China) Peng Shuai	(Russia) Ekaterina Makarova (Russia) Elena Vesnina	2–6, 6–4, [7–10]
Loss	2017	Madrid Open	Clay	(Hungary) Tímea Babos	(Chinese Taipei) Chan Yung-jan (Switzerland) Martina Hingis	4–6, 3–6
Loss	2017	China Open	Hard	(Hungary) Tímea Babos	(Chinese Taipei) Chan Yung-jan (Switzerland) Martina Hingis	1–6, 4–6
Loss	2018	Italian Open	Clay	(Czech Republic) Barbora Strýcová	(Australia) Ashleigh Barty (Netherlands) Demi Schuurs	3–6, 4–6
Loss	2018	Wuhan Open	Hard	(Czech Republic) Barbora Strýcová	(Belgium) Elise Mertens (Netherlands) Demi Schuurs	3–6, 3–6
Win	2018	China Open (2)	Hard	(Czech Republic) Barbora Strýcová	(Canada) Gabriela Dabrowski (China) Xu Yifan	4–6, 6–4, [10–8]

=== Summer Olympics ===
==== Doubles: 1 (silver medal) ====
Result	Year	Tournament	Surface	Partner	Opponents	Score
Silver	2012	London Olympics	Grass	(Czech Republic) Lucie Hradecká	(United States) Serena Williams (United States) Venus Williams	4–6, 4–6
4th place	2016	Rio Olympics	Hard	(Czech Republic) Lucie Hradecká	(Czech Republic) Lucie Šafářová (Czech Republic) Barbora Strýcová	5–7, 1–6

== WTA Tour finals ==
=== Singles: 1 (runner-up) ===
Legend International (0–1)	Finals by surface Clay (0–1)

Result	Date	Tournament	Tier	Surface	Opponent	Score
Loss	Jul 2013	Gastein Ladies, Austria	International	Clay	(Austria) Yvonne Meusburger	5–7, 2–6

=== Doubles: 50 (27 titles, 23 runner-ups) ===
Legend
Grand Slam (2–4)
Olympics (0–1)
WTA Tour Championships / WTA Finals (1–1)
Premier M & Premier 5 (3–5)
Premier (4–6)
Tier III & IV / International (17–6)

Result	W–L	Date	Tournament	Tier	Surface	Partner	Opponents	Score
Win	1–0	May 2007	Prague Open, Czech Republic	Tier IV	Clay	(Czech Republic) Petra Cetkovská	(China) Ji Chunmei (China) Sun Shengnan	7–6^{(9–7)}, 6–2
Win	2–0	Apr 2008	Prague Open, Czech Republic (2)	Tier IV	Clay	(Czech Republic) Lucie Hradecká	(United States) Jill Craybas (Netherlands) Michaëlla Krajicek	1–6, 6–3, [10–6]
Win	3–0	Jul 2008	Gastein Ladies, Austria	Tier III	Clay	(Czech Republic) Lucie Hradecká	(Bulgaria) Sesil Karatantcheva (Serbia) Nataša Zorić	6–3, 6–3
Win	4–0	Jul 2009	Gastein Ladies, Austria (2)	International	Clay	(Czech Republic) Lucie Hradecká	(Germany) Tatjana Malek (Germany) Andrea Petkovic	6–2, 6–4
Win	5–0	Jan 2010	Brisbane International, Australia	International	Hard	(Czech Republic) Lucie Hradecká	(Hungary) Melinda Czink (Spain) Arantxa Parra Santonja	2–6, 7–6^{(7–3)}, [10–4]
Loss	5–1	Feb 2011	National Indoors, US	International	Hard (i)	(Czech Republic) Lucie Hradecká	(Belarus) Olga Govortsova (Russia) Alla Kudryavtseva	3–6, 6–4, [8–10]
Win	6–1	Apr 2011	Morocco Open, Morocco	International	Clay	(Czech Republic) Renata Voráčová	(Russia) Nina Bratchikova (Austria) Sandra Klemenschits	6–3, 6–4
Win	7–1	May 2011	Brussels Open, Belgium	Premier	Clay	(Kazakhstan) Galina Voskoboeva	(Poland) Klaudia Jans (Poland) Alicja Rosolska	3–6, 6–0, [10–5]
Win	8–1	Jun 2011	French Open, France	Grand Slam	Clay	(Czech Republic) Lucie Hradecká	(India) Sania Mirza (Russia) Elena Vesnina	6–4, 6–3
Loss	8–2	Jul 2011	Palermo Ladies Open, Italy	International	Clay	(Czech Republic) Klára Zakopalová	(Italy) Sara Errani (Italy) Roberta Vinci	5–7, 1–6
Win	9–2	Jan 2012	Auckland Open, New Zealand	International	Hard	(Czech Republic) Lucie Hradecká	(Germany) Julia Görges (Italy) Flavia Pennetta	6–7^{(2–7)}, 6–2, [10–7]
Win	10–2	Feb 2012	National Indoors, US	International	Hard (i)	(Czech Republic) Lucie Hradecká	(Russia) Vera Dushevina (Belarus) Olga Govortsova	6–3, 6–4
Loss	10–3	Jul 2012	Wimbledon, UK	Grand Slam	Grass	(Czech Republic) Lucie Hradecká	(United States) Serena Williams (United States) Venus Williams	5–7, 4–6
Loss	10–4	Aug 2012	Summer Olympics, London, UK	Olympics	Hard	(Czech Republic) Lucie Hradecká	(United States) Serena Williams (United States) Venus Williams	4–6, 4–6
Win	11–4	Aug 2012	Cincinnati Open, US	Premier 5	Hard	(Czech Republic) Lucie Hradecká	(Slovenia) Katarina Srebotnik (China) Zheng Jie	6–1, 6–3
Loss	11–5	Aug 2012	Connecticut Open, US	Premier	Hard	(Czech Republic) Lucie Hradecká	(United States) Liezel Huber (United States) Lisa Raymond	6–4, 0–6, [4–10]
Loss	11–6	Sep 2012	US Open, US	Grand Slam	Hard	(Czech Republic) Lucie Hradecká	(Italy) Sara Errani (Italy) Roberta Vinci	4–6, 2–6
Win	12–6	Oct 2012	Luxembourg Open, Luxembourg	International	Hard (i)	(Czech Republic) Lucie Hradecká	(Romania) Irina-Camelia Begu (Romania) Monica Niculescu	6–3, 6–4
Loss	12–7	Oct 2012	WTA Finals, Turkey	Championships	Hard (i)	(Czech Republic) Lucie Hradecká	(Russia) Maria Kirilenko (Russia) Nadia Petrova	1–6, 4–6
Loss	12–8	Feb 2013	Paris Indoors, France	Premier	Hard (i)	(United States) Liezel Huber	(Italy) Sara Errani (Italy) Roberta Vinci	1–6, 1–6
Loss	12–9	Apr 2013	Charleston Open, US	Premier	Clay (green)	(United States) Liezel Huber	(France) Kristina Mladenovic (Czech Republic) Lucie Šafářová	3–6, 6–7^{(6–8)}
Win	13–9	Jul 2013	Budapest Grand Prix, Hungary	International	Clay	(Czech Republic) Lucie Hradecká	(Russia) Nina Bratchikova (Georgia (country)) Anna Tatishvili	6–4, 6–1
Win	14–9	Sep 2013	US Open, US	Grand Slam	Hard	(Czech Republic) Lucie Hradecká	(Australia) Ashleigh Barty (Australia) Casey Dellacqua	6–7^{(4–7)}, 6–1, 6–4
Loss	14–10	Sep 2013	Tournoi de Québec, Canada	International	Carpet (i)	(Czech Republic) Lucie Hradecká	(Russia) Alla Kudryavtseva (Australia) Anastasia Rodionova	4–6, 3–6
Loss	14–11	Sep 2014	Tournoi de Québec, Canada	International	Carpet (i)	(Germany) Julia Görges	(Czech Republic) Lucie Hradecká (Croatia) Mirjana Lučić-Baroni	3–6, 6–7^{(8–10)}
Win	15–11	Oct 2014	China Open, China	Premier M	Hard	(China) Peng Shuai	(Zimbabwe) Cara Black (India) Sania Mirza	6–4, 6–4
Loss	15–12	Feb 2015	Mexican Open, Mexico	International	Hard	(Czech Republic) Lucie Hradecká	(Spain) Lara Arruabarrena (Spain) María Teresa Torró Flor	6–7^{(2–7)}, 7–5, [11–13]
Loss	15–13	Jun 2015	Birmingham Classic, UK	Premier	Grass	(Czech Republic) Lucie Hradecká	(Spain) Garbiñe Muguruza (Spain) Carla Suárez Navarro	4–6, 4–6
Loss	15–14	Oct 2015	Linz Open, Austria	International	Hard	(Czech Republic) Lucie Hradecká	(United States) Raquel Kops-Jones (United States) Abigail Spears	3–6, 5–7
Loss	15–15	Jan 2016	Australian Open, Australia	Grand Slam	Hard	(Czech Republic) Lucie Hradecká	(Switzerland) Martina Hingis (India) Sania Mirza	6–7^{(1–7)}, 3–6
Win	16–15	Apr 2016	Prague Open, Czech Republic (3)	International	Clay	(Russia) Margarita Gasparyan	(Argentina) María Irigoyen (Poland) Paula Kania	6–4, 6–2
Win	17–15	Jun 2016	Nottingham Open, UK	International	Grass	(China) Peng Shuai	(Canada) Gabriela Dabrowski (China) Yang Zhaoxuan	7–5, 3–6, [10–7]
Win	18–15	Sep 2016	Tournoi de Québec, Canada	International	Carpet (i)	(Czech Republic) Lucie Hradecká	(Russia) Alla Kudryavtseva (Russia) Alexandra Panova	7–6^{(7–2)},7–6^{(7–2)}
Win	19–15	Oct 2016	Kremlin Cup, Russia	Premier	Hard (i)	(Czech Republic) Lucie Hradecká	(Australia) Daria Gavrilova (Russia) Daria Kasatkina	4–6, 6–0, [10–7]
Win	20–15	Jan 2017	Shenzhen Open, China	International	Hard	(China) Peng Shuai	(Romania) Raluca Olaru (Ukraine) Olga Savchuk	6–1, 7–5
Loss	20–16	Jan 2017	Australian Open, Australia	Grand Slam	Hard	(China) Peng Shuai	(United States) Bethanie Mattek-Sands (Czech Republic) Lucie Šafářová	7–6^{(7–4)}, 3–6, 3–6
Loss	20–17	Feb 2017	Dubai Championships, UAE	Premier 5	Hard	(China) Peng Shuai	(Russia) Ekaterina Makarova (Russia) Elena Vesnina	2–6, 6–4, [7–10]
Win	21–17	May 2017	Morocco Open, Morocco (2)	International	Clay	(Hungary) Tímea Babos	(Serbia) Nina Stojanović (Belgium) Maryna Zanevska	2–6, 6–3, [10–5]
Loss	21–18	May 2017	Madrid Open, Spain	Premier M	Clay	(Hungary) Tímea Babos	(Chinese Taipei) Chan Yung-jan (Switzerland) Martina Hingis	4–6, 3–6
Win	22–18	Sep 2017	Tournoi de Québec, Canada (2)	International	Carpet (i)	(Hungary) Tímea Babos	(Canada) Bianca Andreescu (Canada) Carson Branstine	6–3, 6–1
Win	23–18	Sep 2017	Tashkent Open, Uzbekistan	International	Hard	(Hungary) Tímea Babos	(Japan) Nao Hibino (Georgia (country)) Oksana Kalashnikova	7–5, 6–4
Loss	23–19	Oct 2017	China Open, China	Premier M	Hard	(Hungary) Tímea Babos	(Chinese Taipei) Chan Yung-jan (Switzerland) Martina Hingis	1–6, 4–6
Win	24–19	Oct 2017	Kremlin Cup, Russia (2)	Premier	Hard (i)	(Hungary) Tímea Babos	(United States) Nicole Melichar (United Kingdom) Anna Smith	6–2, 3–6, [10–3]
Win	25–19	Oct 2017	WTA Finals, Singapore	Finals	Hard (i)	(Hungary) Tímea Babos	(Netherlands) Kiki Bertens (Sweden) Johanna Larsson	4–6, 6–4, [10–5]
Loss	25–20	Jan 2018	Sydney International, Australia	Premier	Hard	(Chinese Taipei) Latisha Chan	(Canada) Gabriela Dabrowski (China) Xu Yifan	3–6, 1–6
Loss	25–21	May 2018	Italian Open, Italy	Premier 5	Clay	(Czech Republic) Barbora Strýcová	(Australia) Ashleigh Barty (Netherlands) Demi Schuurs	3–6, 4–6
Win	26–21	Aug 2018	Connecticut Open, US	Premier	Hard	(Czech Republic) Barbora Strýcová	(Chinese Taipei) Hsieh Su-wei (Germany) Laura Siegemund	6–4, 6–7^{(7–9)}, [10–4]
Loss	26–22	Sep 2018	Pan Pacific Open, Japan	Premier	Hard (i)	(Czech Republic) Barbora Strýcová	(Japan) Miyu Kato (Japan) Makoto Ninomiya	4–6, 4–6
Loss	26–23	Sep 2018	Wuhan Open, China	Premier 5	Hard	(Czech Republic) Barbora Strýcová	(Belgium) Elise Mertens (Netherlands) Demi Schuurs	3–6, 3–6
Win	27–23	Oct 2018	China Open, China (2)	Premier M	Hard	(Czech Republic) Barbora Strýcová	(Canada) Gabriela Dabrowski (China) Xu Yifan	4–6, 6–4, [10–8]

== ITF Circuit finals ==
=== Singles: 17 (8 titles, 9 runner-ups) ===
Legend
60K tournaments (1–1)
25K tournaments (7–6)
10K tournaments (0–2)

Result	W–L	Date	Tournament	Tier	Surface	Opponent	Score
Loss	0–1	Oct 2003	ITF Plzeň, Czech Republic	10K	Carpet (i)	(Czech Republic) Nicole Vaidišová	6–7^{(5–7)}, 4–6
Loss	0–2	Jul 2005	ITF Horb, Germany	10K	Clay	(Germany) Kristina Barrois	5–7, 3–6
Loss	0–3	Mar 2006	ITF Hammond, United States	25K	Hard	(Russia) Olga Puchkova	3–6, 4–6
Win	1–3	May 2006	ITF Tenerife, Spain	25K	Hard	(Australia) Monique Adamczak	3–6, 6–3, 6–3
Loss	1–4	Feb 2008	ITF Sutton, United Kingdom	25K	Hard (i)	(Sweden) Johanna Larsson	5–7, 0–6
Loss	1–5	Jun 2009	ITF Szczecin, Poland	25K	Clay	(Germany) Stephanie Gehrlein	4–6, 0–6
Win	2–5	Aug 2009	ITF Bad Saulgau, Germany	25K	Clay	(Serbia) Ana Jovanović	6–4, 6–4
Win	3–5	Feb 2010	ITF Sutton, United Kingdom	25K	Hard (i)	(United States) Mallory Cecil	6–1, 4–6, 6–4
Loss	3–6	May 2010	ITF Brescia, Italy	25K	Clay	(United Kingdom) Naomi Cavaday	2–6, 4–6
Win	4–6	Jul 2010	ITF Les Contamines, France	25K	Hard	(Bulgaria) Elitsa Kostova	7–5, 0–6, 6–4
Win	5–6	Jul 2010	ITF Vigo, Spain	25K	Hard	(United Kingdom) Katie O'Brien	6–2, 6–0
Loss	5–7	Oct 2010	ITF Istanbul, Turkey	25K	Hard	(France) Iryna Brémond	6–3, 1–6, 5–7
Loss	5–8	Nov 2010	Ismaning Open, Germany	50K	Carpet (i)	(Poland) Urszula Radwańska	5–7, 4–6
Loss	5–9	May 2011	Chiasso Open, Switzerland	25K	Clay	(Puerto Rico) Monica Puig	6–7^{(4–7)}, 5–7
Win	6–9	Aug 2011	Bronx Open, United States	50K	Hard	(Germany) Mona Barthel	7–6^{(10–8)}, 6–3
Win	7–9	Oct 2011	ITF Clermont-Ferrand, France	25K	Hard (i)	(Germany) Tatjana Maria	6–4, 0–6, 7–6^{(8–6)}
Win	8–9	Aug 2015	ITF Plzeň, Czech Republic	25K	Clay	(Czech Republic) Barbora Krejčíková	3–6, 6–2, 6–3

=== Doubles: 29 (19 titles, 10 runner-ups) ===
Legend
100K tournaments (3–1)
75K tournaments (1–0)
50K tournaments (2–1)
25K tournaments (12–6)
10K tournaments (1–2)

Result	W–L	Date	Tournament	Tier	Surface	Partner	Opponents	Score
Win	1–0	Oct 2003	ITF Plzeň, Czech Republic	10K	Carpet (i)	(Czech Republic) Tereza Szafnerová	(Czech Republic) Lucie Kriegsmannová (Czech Republic) Pavlína Šlitrová	3–6, 6–0, 6–1
Loss	1–1	Mar 2004	ITF Elda, Spain	10K	Clay	(Czech Republic) Jana Hlaváčková	(Spain) Lourdes Domínguez Lino (Portugal) Frederica Piedade	w/o
Loss	1–2	Oct 2004	ITF Juárez, Mexico	25K	Clay	(Czech Republic) Jana Hlaváčková	(Brazil) Carla Tiene (Brazil) Maria Fernanda Alves	4–6, 0–6
Loss	1–3	Mar 2005	ITF Rogaška Slatina, Slovakia	10K	Carpet (i)	(Slovakia) Kristína Michalaková	(Czech Republic) Lucie Hradecká (Czech Republic) Zuzana Zálabská	5–7, 0–6
Win	2–3	Feb 2006	ITF Jersey, United Kingdom	25K	Hard	(Croatia) Matea Mezak	(United Kingdom) Katie O'Brien (United Kingdom) Melanie South	6–3, 6–1
Win	3–3	Jun 2006	ITF Fontanafredda, Italy	25K	Clay	(Czech Republic) Renata Voráčová	(Austria) Daniela Klemenschits (Austria) Sandra Klemenschits	6–4, 6–4
Win	4–3	Nov 2006	ITF Opole, Poland	25K	Carpet	(Czech Republic) Nikola Fraňková	(Poland) Olga Brózda (Poland) Natalia Kołat	7–5, 6–0
Win	5–3	Nov 2006	ITF Přerov, Czech Republic	25K	Hard (i)	(Czech Republic) Nikola Fraňková	(Czech Republic) Eva Hrdinová (Slovakia) Stanislava Hrozenská	6–2, 6–7^{(5–7)}, 6–3
Win	6–3	Dec 2006	ITF Valašské Meziříčí, Czech Republic	25K	Hard	(Czech Republic) Nikola Fraňková	(Poland) Olga Brózda (Poland) Natalia Kołat	6–1, 6–2
Loss	6–4	Jan 2007	ITF Tampa, United States	25K	Hard	(Czech Republic) Olga Vymetálková	(Germany) Angelika Bachmann (United States) Tetiana Luzhanska	5–7, 2–6
Loss	6–5	Jan 2007	ITF Sutton, United Kingdom	25K	Hard (i)	(Czech Republic) Katarína Kachlíková	(United Kingdom) Claire Curran (United Kingdom) Anne Keothavong	6–4, 4–6, 2–6
Win	7–5	Mar 2007	ITF Tenerife, Spain	25K	Hard	(Estonia) Margit Rüütel	(Czech Republic) Veronika Chvojková (Czech Republic) Petra Cetkovská	2–3 ret.
Win	8–5	Mar 2007	ITF La Palma, Spain	25K	Hard	(Czech Republic) Petra Cetkovská	(Spain) Arantxa Parra Santonja (United Kingdom) Melanie South	6–3, 6–2
Win	9–5	Apr 2007	ITF Calvià, Spain	25K	Clay	(Czech Republic) Petra Cetkovská	(Spain) Arantxa Parra Santonja (Spain) María José Martínez Sánchez	7–5, 6–4
Loss	9–6	Jul 2007	ITF La Coruña, Spain	25K	Hard	(Germany) Justine Ozga	(New Zealand) Marina Erakovic (United Kingdom) Melanie South	1–6, 6–4, 4–6
Win	10–6	Oct 2007	ITF Jersey, United Kingdom	25K	Hard (i)	(Czech Republic) Lucie Hradecká	(United Kingdom) Katie O'Brien (United Kingdom) Georgie Gent	6–0, 6–4
Loss	10–7	Nov 2007	Ismaning Open, Germany	25K	Hard (i)	(Czech Republic) Lucie Hradecká	(Germany) Julia Görges (Germany) Kristina Barrois	6–2, 2–6, [7–10]
Win	11–7	Dec 2007	ITF Valašské Meziříčí, Czech Republic	25K	Hard (i)	(Czech Republic) Lucie Hradecká	(Croatia) Darija Jurak (Croatia) Ivana Lisjak	6–2, 6–1
Win	12–7	Feb 2008	ITF Belford, France	25K	Hard (i)	(Czech Republic) Lucie Hradecká	(Spain) Marta Marrero (Spain) María José Martínez Sánchez	7–6^{(10–8)}, 6–4
Win	13–7	Feb 2008	ITF Sutton, United Kingdom	25K	Hard (i)	(Czech Republic) Lucie Hradecká	(Sweden) Johanna Larsson (United Kingdom) Anna Smith	6–3, 6–3
Loss	13–8	Apr 2008	ITF Hamburg, Germany	25K	Carpet (i)	(Czech Republic) Veronika Chvojková	(Switzerland) Stefanie Vögele (Ukraine) Yuliya Beygelzimer	6–7^{(3–7)}, 2–6
Win	14–8	Nov 2008	Slovak Open, Slovakia	100K	Hard (i)	(Czech Republic) Lucie Hradecká	(Uzbekistan) Akgul Amanmuradova (Romania) Monica Niculescu	7–6^{(7–1)}, 6–1
Win	15–8	Jul 2009	Pozoblanco Open, Spain	50K	Hard	(Ukraine) Olga Savchuk	(Russia) Nina Bratchikova (Romania) Ágnes Szatmári	6–3, 6–3
Win	16–8	Nov 2010	GB Pro-Series Barnstaple, UK	75K	Hard (i)	(Netherlands) Michaëlla Krajicek	(Austria) Sandra Klemenschits (Germany) Tatjana Maria	7–6^{(7–4)}, 6–2
Win	17–8	Feb 2012	Midland Tennis Classic, U.S.	100K	Hard (i)	(Czech Republic) Lucie Hradecká	(Russia) Vesna Dolonc (France) Stéphanie Foretz	7–6^{(7–4)}, 6–2
Loss	17–9	Oct 2013	Open de Touraine, France	50K	Hard (i)	(Netherlands) Michaëlla Krajicek	(France) Julie Coin (Croatia) Ana Vrljić	3–6, 6–4, [13–15]
Win	18–9	Oct 2013	Challenger de Saguenay, Canada	50K	Hard (i)	(Poland) Marta Domachowska	(Canada) Françoise Abanda (United States) Victoria Duval	7–5, 6–3
Loss	18–10	May 2014	Prague Open, Czech Republic	100K	Clay	(Czech Republic) Lucie Šafářová	(Czech Republic) Lucie Hradecká (Netherlands) Michaëlla Krajicek	3–6, 2–6
Win	19–10	Oct 2014	Internationaux de Poitiers, France	100K	Hard (i)	(Czech Republic) Lucie Hradecká	(Poland) Katarzyna Piter (Ukraine) Maryna Zanevska	6–1, 7–5
