= 2017 Mutua Madrid Open – Women's doubles =

Women's doubles
- 2017 Mutua Madrid Open

Final
- Champions: (Chinese Taipei) Chan Yung-jan (Switzerland) Martina Hingis
- Runners-up: (Hungary) Tímea Babos (Czech Republic) Andrea Hlaváčková
- Score: 6–4, 6–3

Events
| Singles | men | women |
| Doubles | men | women |
| ← 2016 · | Mutua Madrid Open | · 2018 → |

Caroline Garcia and Kristina Mladenovic were the defending champions, but Garcia chose not to participate this year. Mladenovic played alongside Svetlana Kuznetsova, but lost in the first round to Kiki Bertens and Johanna Larsson.

Chan Yung-jan and Martina Hingis won their second Premier Mandatory title of the year, defeating Tímea Babos and Andrea Hlaváčková in the final, 6–4, 6–3.

== Seeds ==
The top 4 seeds received a bye into the second round.

1. (United States) Bethanie Mattek-Sands / (Czech Republic) Lucie Šafářová (second round)
2. (Russia) Ekaterina Makarova / (Russia) Elena Vesnina (second round)
3. (Chinese Taipei) Chan Yung-jan / (Switzerland) Martina Hingis (champions)
4. (India) Sania Mirza / (Kazakhstan) Yaroslava Shvedova (quarterfinals)
5. (Hungary) Tímea Babos / (Czech Republic) Andrea Hlaváčková (final)
6. (Czech Republic) Lucie Hradecká / (Czech Republic) Kateřina Siniaková (quarterfinals)
7. (Germany) Julia Görges / (Czech Republic) Barbora Strýcová (first round)
8. (United States) Abigail Spears / (Slovenia) Katarina Srebotnik (first round)

== Draw ==
=== Key ===
- Q = Qualifier
- WC = Wild card
- LL = Lucky loser
- Alt = Alternate
- SE = Special exempt
- PR = Protected ranking
- ITF = ITF entry
- JE = Junior exempt
- w/o = Walkover
- r = Retired
- d = Defaulted
- SR = Special ranking

=== Finals ===
Semifinals
5 | (Hungary) Tímea Babos (Czech Republic) Andrea Hlaváčková | 6 | 6
(Romania) Irina-Camelia Begu (Romania) Simona Halep | 4 | 2
3 | (Chinese Taipei) Chan Yung-jan (Switzerland) Martina Hingis | 6 | 6
WC | (Spain) Arantxa Parra Santonja (Spain) Sílvia Soler Espinosa | 3 | 2

Final
5 | (Hungary) Tímea Babos (Czech Republic) Andrea Hlaváčková | 4 | 3
3 | (Chinese Taipei) Chan Yung-jan (Switzerland) Martina Hingis | 6 | 6

=== Top half ===
First round
(Netherlands) K Bertens (Sweden) J Larsson | 7^{7} | 7
(Russia) S Kuznetsova (France) K Mladenovic | 6^{4} | 5
(China) C Liang (Ukraine) O Savchuk | 7^{7} | 6^{5} | [5]
WC | (Spain) L Arruabarrena (Spain) S Sorribes Tormo | 6^{5} | 7^{7} | [10]
WC | (United Kingdom) J Konta (United States) S Rogers | 5 | 1
5 | (Hungary) T Babos (Czech Republic) A Hlaváčková | 7 | 6
(United States) C McHale (Romania) M Niculescu | 6 | 3 | [10]
(Czech Republic) B Krejčíková (Russia) A Kudryavtseva | 3 | 6 | [8]
(Japan) N Hibino (Poland) A Rosolska | 3 | 6 | [10]
(Switzerland) X Knoll (United States) A Muhammad | 6 | 2 | [2]
(Romania) I-C Begu (Romania) S Halep | 5 | 6 | [10]
8 | (United States) A Spears (Slovenia) K Srebotnik | 7 | 3 | [8]

Second round
1 | (United States) B Mattek-Sands (Czech Republic) L Šafářová | 4 | 6^{2}
(Netherlands) K Bertens (Sweden) J Larsson | 6 | 7^{7}
WC | (Spain) L Arruabarrena (Spain) S Sorribes Tormo | 0 | 6 | [3]
5 | (Hungary) T Babos (Czech Republic) A Hlaváčková | 6 | 3 | [10]
4 | (India) S Mirza (Kazakhstan) Y Shvedova | 6 | 7
(United States) C McHale (Romania) M Niculescu | 1 | 5
(Japan) N Hibino (Poland) A Rosolska | 2 | 5
(Romania) I-C Begu (Romania) S Halep | 6 | 7

Quarterfinals
(Netherlands) K Bertens (Sweden) J Larsson | 2 | 4
5 | (Hungary) T Babos (Czech Republic) A Hlaváčková | 6 | 6
4 | (India) S Mirza (Kazakhstan) Y Shvedova | 3 | 6 | [6]
(Romania) I-C Begu (Romania) S Halep | 6 | 3 | [10]

Semifinals
5 | (Hungary) T Babos (Czech Republic) A Hlaváčková | 6 | 6
(Romania) I-C Begu (Romania) S Halep | 4 | 2

=== Bottom half ===
First round
7 | (Germany) J Görges (Czech Republic) B Strýcová | 6 | 4 | [8]
(Germany) A-L Grönefeld (Czech Republic) K Peschke | 4 | 6 | [10]
(Chinese Taipei) H-c Chan (Latvia) J Ostapenko | 7 | 3 | [6]
(Canada) G Dabrowski (China) Y Xu | 5 | 6 | [10]
(Slovenia) A Klepač (Spain) MJ Martínez Sánchez | 5 | 6^{5}
(Croatia) D Jurak (Australia) An Rodionova | 7 | 7^{7}
6 | (Czech Republic) L Hradecká (Czech Republic) K Siniaková | 6 | 7^{7}
(United States) R Atawo (Russia) D Kasatkina | 1 | 6^{3}
(Australia) S Stosur (China) S Zhang | 7^{7} | 6
(Australia) D Gavrilova (Russia) A Pavlyuchenkova | 6^{5} | 2
WC | (Spain) A Parra Santonja (Spain) S Soler Espinosa | 6 | 4 | [10]
(Chinese Taipei) C-j Chuang (China) S Peng | 1 | 6 | [3]

Second round
(Germany) A-L Grönefeld (Czech Republic) K Peschke | 6 | 6
(Canada) G Dabrowski (China) Y Xu | 4 | 4
(Croatia) D Jurak (Australia) An Rodionova | 6 | 2 | [6]
3 | (Chinese Taipei) Y-j Chan (Switzerland) M Hingis | 4 | 6 | [10]
6 | (Czech Republic) L Hradecká (Czech Republic) K Siniaková | 6 | 7
(Australia) S Stosur (China) S Zhang | 2 | 5
WC | (Spain) A Parra Santonja (Spain) S Soler Espinosa | 6 | 2 | [10]
2 | (Russia) E Makarova (Russia) E Vesnina | 4 | 6 | [6]

Quarterfinals
(Germany) A-L Grönefeld (Czech Republic) K Peschke | 6 | 3 | [8]
3 | (Chinese Taipei) Y-j Chan (Switzerland) M Hingis | 4 | 6 | [10]
6 | (Czech Republic) L Hradecká (Czech Republic) K Siniaková | 2 | 3
WC | (Spain) A Parra Santonja (Spain) S Soler Espinosa | 6 | 6

Semifinals
3 | (Chinese Taipei) Y-j Chan (Switzerland) M Hingis | 6 | 6
WC | (Spain) A Parra Santonja (Spain) S Soler Espinosa | 3 | 2
