= 2013 Western & Southern Open – Women's singles =

Tennis tournament

Women's singles
- 2013 Western & Southern Open

Final
- Champion: (Belarus) Victoria Azarenka
- Runner-up: (United States) Serena Williams
- Score: 2–6, 6–2, 7–6^{(8–6)}

Details
- Draw: 56
- Seeds: 16

Events
Singles	men	women
Doubles	men	women
- Western & Southern Open

Victoria Azarenka defeated Serena Williams in the final, 2–6, 6–2, 7–6^{(8–6)} to win the women's singles tennis title at the 2013 Cincinnati Masters. It was Azarenka's second win against Williams during the year, and Williams' fourth and last loss of the year.

Li Na was the defending champion, but lost to Williams in the semifinals.

This marked the final professional appearance of reigning Wimbledon champion Marion Bartoli; she lost to Simona Halep in the second round.

== Seeds ==
The top eight seeds received a bye into the second round.

1. (United States) Serena Williams (final)
2. (Belarus) Victoria Azarenka (champion)
3. (Russia) Maria Sharapova (second round)
4. (Poland) Agnieszka Radwańska (quarterfinals, withdrew because of personal reasons)
5. (China) Li Na (semifinals)
6. (Italy) Sara Errani (third round)
7. (Czech Republic) Petra Kvitová (third round)
8. (France) Marion Bartoli (second round)
9. (Germany) Angelique Kerber (third round)
10. (Denmark) Caroline Wozniacki (quarterfinals)
11. (Australia) Samantha Stosur (third round)
12. (Italy) Roberta Vinci (quarterfinals)
13. (Belgium) Kirsten Flipkens (first round)
14. (Serbia) Jelena Janković (semifinals)
15. (Serbia) Ana Ivanovic (first round)
16. (Russia) Maria Kirilenko (second round)

== Draw ==
Key

- Q = Qualifier
- WC = Wild card
- LL = Lucky loser
- Alt = Alternate
- ITF = ITF entry
- PR = Protected ranking
- SR = Special ranking
- SE = Special exempt
- JE = Junior exempt
- JR = Junior Accelerator Programme entrant
- CO = College Accelerator Programme entrant
- NG = Next Gen Accelerator Program entrant
- w/o = Walkover
- r = Retired
- d = Defaulted

=== Finals ===
Quarterfinals
1	(United States) Serena Williams	6	6
(Romania) Simona Halep	0	4
4	(Poland) Agnieszka Radwańska
5	(China) Li Na	w/o
12	(Italy) Roberta Vinci	0	4
14	(Serbia) Jelena Janković	6	6
10	(Denmark) Caroline Wozniacki	3	6^{5}
2	(Belarus) Victoria Azarenka	6	7^{7}

Semifinals
1	(United States) Serena Williams	7	7
5	(China) Li Na	5	5
14	(Serbia) Jelena Janković	6	2	3
2	(Belarus) Victoria Azarenka	4	6	6

Final
1	(United States) Serena Williams	6	2	6^{6}
2	(Belarus) Victoria Azarenka	2	6	7^{8}

=== Top half ===
==== Section 1 ====
First round
Q	(Puerto Rico) M Puig	3	4
Q	(Canada) E Bouchard	6	6
(Germany) M Barthel	6	6
(Czech Republic) L Šafářová	3	4
Q	(Georgia (country)) A Tatishvili	6	6^{4}	6^{4}
16	(Russia) M Kirilenko	4	7^{7}	7^{7}
11	(Australia) S Stosur	6	7
(Russia) S Kuznetsova	1	5
(Russia) A Pavlyuchenkova	5	6	3
(United States) J Hampton	7	4	6
(Romania) S Halep	6^{5}	6	6
(Chinese Taipei) S-w Hsieh	7^{7}	1	2

Second round
1	(United States) S Williams	4	6	6
Q	(Canada) E Bouchard	6	2	2
(Germany) M Barthel	6	6
16	(Russia) M Kirilenko	4	4
11	(Australia) S Stosur	6	7^{7}
(United States) J Hampton	3	6^{3}
(Romania) S Halep	3	6	6
8	(France) M Bartoli	6	4	1

Third round
1	(United States) S Williams	6	6
(Germany) M Barthel	4	1
11	(Australia) S Stosur	4	6	2
(Romania) S Halep	6	4	6

Quarterfinals
1	(United States) S Williams	6	6
(Romania) S Halep	0	4

==== Section 2 ====
First round
PR	(Italy) F Pennetta	2	6	2
(United States) V Lepchenko	6	2	6
Q	(Slovakia) J Čepelová	4	1
(United States) V Williams	6	6
(Russia) E Vesnina	3	6	6
13	(Belgium) K Flipkens	6	1	3
9	(Germany) A Kerber	6^{6}	6	6
Q	(Italy) K Knapp	7^{8}	0	1
Q	(Sweden) S Arvidsson	6	4	6^{7}
PR	(Russia) A Kleybanova	4	6	7^{9}
WC	(United States) L Davis	7^{7}	7^{7}
(Czech Republic) K Zakopalová	6^{3}	6^{1}

Second round
4	(Poland) A Radwańska	6	6
(United States) V Lepchenko	4	0
(United States) V Williams	2	7	2
(Russia) E Vesnina	6	5	6
9	(Germany) A Kerber	7^{7}	6
PR	(Russia) A Kleybanova	6^{3}	2
WC	(United States) L Davis	6	1	1
5	(China) N Li	4	6	6

Third round
4	(Poland) A Radwańska	6	6
(Russia) E Vesnina	0	2
9	(Germany) A Kerber	4	4
5	(China) N Li	6	6

Quarterfinals
4	(Poland) A Radwańska
5	(China) N Li	w/o

=== Bottom half ===
==== Section 3 ====
First round
(Slovakia) D Cibulková	2	4
Q	(Slovenia) P Hercog	6	6
WC	(Slovakia) D Hantuchová	6	4	1
Q	(Germany) A Petkovic	2	6	6
WC	(United States) B Mattek-Sands	4	7	3
12	(Italy) R Vinci	6	5	6
14	(Serbia) J Janković	7^{7}	5	6
(Germany) S Lisicki	6^{5}	7	2
Q	(Germany) A Beck	3	2
(Russia) E Makarova	6	6
(United States) S Stephens	6	3	6
Q	(Croatia) P Martić	2	6	3

Second round
6	(Italy) S Errani	6	5	6
Q	(Slovenia) P Hercog	4	7	4
Q	(Germany) A Petkovic	4	7^{7}	3
12	(Italy) R Vinci	6	6^{3}	6
14	(Serbia) J Janković	2	6	6
(Russia) E Makarova	6	3	3
(United States) S Stephens	2	7^{7}	6
3	(Russia) M Sharapova	6	6^{5}	3

Third round
6	(Italy) S Errani	4	3
12	(Italy) R Vinci	6	6
14	(Serbia) J Janković	3	7	7
(United States) S Stephens	6	5	5

Quarterfinals
12	(Italy) R Vinci	0	4
14	(Serbia) J Janković	6	6

==== Section 4 ====
First round
Q	(New Zealand) M Erakovic	6	6
(Spain) C Suárez Navarro	3	4
(Belgium) Y Wickmayer	1	2
LL	(Romania) M Niculescu	6	6
(China) S Peng	1	1
10	(Denmark) C Wozniacki	6	6
15	(Serbia) A Ivanovic	6	6^{8}	4
(France) A Cornet	2	7^{10}	6
(Slovakia) M Rybáriková	6	4	6
(Germany) J Görges	2	6	4
Q	(United States) V King	6	6
(France) K Mladenovic	3	4

Second round
7	(Czech Republic) P Kvitová	6	6^{7}	6
Q	(New Zealand) M Erakovic	4	7^{9}	3
LL	(Romania) M Niculescu	4	3
10	(Denmark) C Wozniacki	6	6
(France) A Cornet	6	5	5
(Slovakia) M Rybáriková	3	7	7
Q	(United States) V King	1	6^{6}
2	(Belarus) V Azarenka	6	7^{8}

Third round
7	(Czech Republic) P Kvitová	6	2	3
10	(Denmark) C Wozniacki	3	6	6
(Slovakia) M Rybáriková	3	4
2	(Belarus) V Azarenka	6	6

Quarterfinals
10	(Denmark) C Wozniacki	3	6^{5}
2	(Belarus) V Azarenka	6	7^{7}

== Qualifying draw ==
=== Seeds ===
1. (Poland) Urszula Radwańska (first round)
2. (United States) Madison Keys (withdrew because of a right shoulder injury)
3. (Romania) Monica Niculescu (qualifying competition, lucky loser)
4. (Germany) Annika Beck (qualified)
5. (Switzerland) Stefanie Vögele (first round)
6. (Germany) Andrea Petkovic (qualified)
7. (Puerto Rico) Monica Puig (qualified)
8. (Japan) Ayumi Morita (first round)
9. (Spain) Lourdes Domínguez Lino (qualifying competition)
10. (China) Zheng Jie (first round)
11. (Italy) Francesca Schiavone (first round)
12. (Italy) Karin Knapp (qualified)
13. (Canada) Eugenie Bouchard (qualified)
14. (Japan) Kimiko Date-Krumm (qualifying competition)
15. (Croatia) Donna Vekić (first round)
16. (Bulgaria) Tsvetana Pironkova (first round)
17. (South Africa) Chanelle Scheepers (qualifying competition)
18. (Sweden) Johanna Larsson (qualifying competition)
19. (Spain) Sílvia Soler Espinosa (first round)
20. (Argentina) Paula Ormaechea (first round)
21. (Czech Republic) Karolína Plíšková (qualifying competition)
22. (Romania) Irina-Camelia Begu (first round)
23. (Belarus) Olga Govortsova (qualifying competition)
24. (New Zealand) Marina Erakovic (qualified)

=== Qualifiers ===
1. (Croatia) Petra Martić
2. (Canada) Eugenie Bouchard
3. (United States) Vania King
4. (Germany) Annika Beck
5. (Sweden) Sofia Arvidsson
6. (Germany) Andrea Petkovic
7. (Puerto Rico) Monica Puig
8. (Slovakia) Jana Čepelová
9. (Slovenia) Polona Hercog
10. (Georgia (country)) Anna Tatishvili
11. (New Zealand) Marina Erakovic
12. (Italy) Karin Knapp

=== Lucky loser ===
1. (Romania) Monica Niculescu

=== Draw ===
==== First qualifier ====
First round
1	(Poland) Urszula Radwańska	6	4	4
(Croatia) Petra Martić	4	6	6
(Spain) María Teresa Torró Flor	6	6
16	(Bulgaria) Tsvetana Pironkova	2	2

Qualifying competition
(Croatia) Petra Martić	6	6
(Spain) María Teresa Torró Flor	2	1

==== Second qualifier ====
First round
Alt	(Colombia) Mariana Duque	3	1
(Serbia) Vesna Dolonc	6	6
(Spain) Anabel Medina Garrigues	0	3
13	(Canada) Eugenie Bouchard	6	6

Qualifying competition
(Serbia) Vesna Dolonc	3	1
13	(Canada) Eugenie Bouchard	6	6

==== Third qualifier ====
First round
3	(Romania) Monica Niculescu	6	6
(Czech Republic) Andrea Hlaváčková	1	4
WC	(United States) Vania King	4	6	6
20	(Argentina) Paula Ormaechea	6	2	4

Qualifying competition
3	(Romania) Monica Niculescu	5	1
WC	(United States) Vania King	7	6

==== Fourth qualifier ====
First round
4	(Germany) Annika Beck	6	4	6
WC	(United States) Shelby Rogers	3	6	2
(Russia) Olga Puchkova	6	2	2
23	(Belarus) Olga Govortsova	3	6	6

Qualifying competition
4	(Germany) Annika Beck	6	6
23	(Belarus) Olga Govortsova	4	4

==== Fifth qualifier ====
First round
5	(Switzerland) Stefanie Vögele	6	3	2
(Sweden) Sofia Arvidsson	4	6	6
(Romania) Alexandra Dulgheru	6	4	6
15	(Croatia) Donna Vekić	2	6	4

Qualifying competition
(Sweden) Sofia Arvidsson	6	6
(Romania) Alexandra Dulgheru	1	2

==== Sixth qualifier ====
First round
6	(Germany) Andrea Petkovic	6	6
WC	(United States) Maria Sanchez	0	0
(France) Caroline Garcia	6	3	3
21	(Czech Republic) Karolína Plíšková	3	6	6

Qualifying competition
6	(Germany) Andrea Petkovic	7	6
21	(Czech Republic) Karolína Plíšková	5	2

==== Seventh qualifier ====
First round
7	(Puerto Rico) Monica Puig	6	6
(United States) Mallory Burdette	4	4
WC	(United States) Melanie Oudin	2	5
17	(South Africa) Chanelle Scheepers	6	7

Qualifying competition
7	(Puerto Rico) Monica Puig	6	6
17	(South Africa) Chanelle Scheepers	1	4

==== Eighth qualifier ====
First round
8	(Japan) Ayumi Morita	2	0
(United States) Alison Riske	6	6
(Slovakia) Jana Čepelová	6	6
22	(Romania) Irina-Camelia Begu	2	2

Qualifying competition
(United States) Alison Riske	6^{5}	6	2
(Slovakia) Jana Čepelová	7^{7}	3	6

==== Ninth qualifier ====
First round
9	(Spain) Lourdes Domínguez Lino	6	6
(United States) Christina McHale	0	4
WC	(Slovenia) Polona Hercog	3	6	7^{13}
19	(Spain) Sílvia Soler Espinosa	6	2	6^{11}

Qualifying competition
9	(Spain) Lourdes Domínguez Lino	6^{3}	0
WC	(Slovenia) Polona Hercog	7^{7}	6

==== Tenth qualifier ====
First round
10	(China) Zheng Jie	7	1	2
(Georgia (country)) Anna Tatishvili	5	6	6
(Kazakhstan) Galina Voskoboeva	4	0
14	(Japan) Kimiko Date-Krumm	6	6

Qualifying competition
(Georgia (country)) Anna Tatishvili	6	6
14	(Japan) Kimiko Date-Krumm	3	4

==== Eleventh qualifier ====
First round
11	(Italy) Francesca Schiavone	6	3	2
(United Kingdom) Heather Watson	1	6	6
(Czech Republic) Petra Cetkovská	4	7	3
24	(New Zealand) Marina Erakovic	6	5	6

Qualifying competition
(United Kingdom) Heather Watson	4	7^{7}	3
24	(New Zealand) Marina Erakovic	6	6^{4}	6

==== Twelfth qualifier ====
First round
12	(Italy) Karin Knapp	6	6
(Spain) Lara Arruabarrena	4	2
WC	(United States) Nicole Gibbs	4	6	2
18	(Sweden) Johanna Larsson	6	3	6

Qualifying competition
12	(Italy) Karin Knapp	5	6	6
18	(Sweden) Johanna Larsson	7	2	4
