= 2013 Western & Southern Open – Women's doubles =

Women's doubles
- 2013 Western & Southern Open

Final
- Champion: (Chinese Taipei) Hsieh Su-wei (China) Peng Shuai
- Runner-up: (Germany) Anna-Lena Grönefeld (Czech Republic) Květa Peschke
- Score: 2–6, 6–3, [12–10]

Details
- Seeds: 8

Events
Singles	men	women
Doubles	men	women
← 2012 ·	Western & Southern Open	· 2014 →

Andrea Hlaváčková and Lucie Hradecká are the defending champions, but Hradecká decided not to participate.

Hlaváčková partnered with Lisa Raymond, but lost in the second round to Angelique Kerber and Andrea Petkovic. Hsieh Su-wei and Peng Shuai won the final over Anna-Lena Grönefeld and Květa Peschke, 2–6, 6–3, [12–10].

== Seeds ==
The top four seeds received a bye into the second round.

1. (Italy) Sara Errani / (Italy) Roberta Vinci (quarterfinals)
2. (Russia) Ekaterina Makarova / (Russia) Elena Vesnina (semifinals)
3. (Chinese Taipei) Hsieh Su-wei / (China) Peng Shuai (champions)
4. (Czech Republic) Andrea Hlaváčková / (United States) Lisa Raymond (second round)
5. (United States) Raquel Kops-Jones / (United States) Abigail Spears (first round)
6. (Germany) Anna-Lena Grönefeld / (Czech Republic) Květa Peschke (final)
7. (Chinese Taipei) Chan Hao-ching / (Slovenia) Katarina Srebotnik (quarterfinals)
8. (India) Sania Mirza / (China) Zheng Jie (first round)

== Draw ==
=== Key ===
- Q = Qualifier
- WC = Wild card
- LL = Lucky loser
- Alt = Alternate
- SE = Special exempt
- PR = Protected ranking
- ITF = ITF entry
- JE = Junior exempt
- w/o = Walkover
- r = Retired
- d = Defaulted
- SR = Special ranking

=== Finals ===
Semifinals
(Germany) Julia Görges (Czech Republic) Barbora Záhlavová-Strýcová	3	2
6	(Germany) Anna-Lena Grönefeld (Czech Republic) Květa Peschke	6	6
3	(Chinese Taipei) Hsieh Su-wei (China) Peng Shuai	6	3	[10]
2	(Russia) Ekaterina Makarova (Russia) Elena Vesnina	1	6	[3]

Final
6	(Germany) Anna-Lena Grönefeld (Czech Republic) Květa Peschke	6	3	[10]
3	(Chinese Taipei) Hsieh Su-wei (China) Peng Shuai	2	6	[12]

=== Top half ===
First round
(Spain) A Medina Garrigues (Italy) F Pennetta	6	4	[5]
WC	(Slovakia) D Hantuchová (Switzerland) M Hingis	4	6	[10]
(Hungary) K Marosi (United States) M Moulton-Levy	6^{4}	4
WC	(Belgium) K Flipkens (Czech Republic) P Kvitová	7^{7}	6
(Germany) J Görges (Czech Republic) B Záhlavová-Strýcová	6	6
5	(United States) R Kops-Jones (United States) A Spears	3	3
(Zimbabwe) C Black (New Zealand) M Erakovic	6^{5}	6^{6}
WC	(Germany) A Kerber (Germany) A Petkovic	7^{7}	7^{8}
(United States) V Lepchenko (China) S Zheng	4	3
(Russia) A Pavlyuchenkova (Czech Republic) L Šafářová	6	6
(Slovakia) J Husárová (Romania) M Niculescu	2	3
6	(Germany) A-L Grönefeld (Czech Republic) K Peschke	6	6

Second round
1	(Italy) S Errani (Italy) R Vinci	6	6
WC	(Slovakia) D Hantuchová (Switzerland) M Hingis	4	4
WC	(Belgium) K Flipkens (Czech Republic) P Kvitová
(Germany) J Görges (Czech Republic) B Záhlavová-Strýcová	w/o
4	(Czech Republic) A Hlaváčková (United States) L Raymond	3	6	[9]
WC	(Germany) A Kerber (Germany) A Petkovic	6	4	[11]
(Russia) A Pavlyuchenkova (Czech Republic) L Šafářová	2	1
6	(Germany) A-L Grönefeld (Czech Republic) K Peschke	6	6

Quarterfinals
1	(Italy) S Errani (Italy) R Vinci	6	2	[9]
(Germany) J Görges (Czech Republic) B Záhlavová-Strýcová	4	6	[11]
WC	(Germany) A Kerber (Germany) A Petkovic	1	6	[10]
6	(Germany) A-L Grönefeld (Czech Republic) K Peschke	6	2	[12]

Semifinals
(Germany) J Görges (Czech Republic) B Záhlavová-Strýcová	3	2
6	(Germany) A-L Grönefeld (Czech Republic) K Peschke	6	6

=== Bottom half ===
First round
7	(Chinese Taipei) H-c Chan (Slovenia) K Srebotnik	6	6
(Japan) S Aoyama (South Africa) C Scheepers	3	2
(Serbia) J Janković (Croatia) M Lučić-Baroni	2	2
(Russia) A Kudryavtseva (Australia) A Rodionova	6	6
(Russia) V Dushevina (Spain) S Soler Espinosa	2	7	[10]
(Romania) I-C Begu (China) S Zhang	6	5	[4]
8	(India) S Mirza (China) J Zheng	7^{7}	4	[5]
(Japan) K Date-Krumm (Spain) A Parra Santonja	6^{4}	6	[10]
(France) K Mladenovic (Kazakhstan) G Voskoboeva	6^{3}	3
(United States) L Huber (Spain) N Llagostera Vives	7^{7}	6
(South Africa) N Grandin (Croatia) D Jurak	4	5
WC	(United States) V King (Russia) A Kleybanova	6	7

Second round
7	(Chinese Taipei) H-c Chan (Slovenia) K Srebotnik	4	6	[10]
(Russia) A Kudryavtseva (Australia) A Rodionova	6	3	[6]
(Russia) V Dushevina (Spain) S Soler Espinosa	1	1
3	(Chinese Taipei) S-w Hsieh (China) S Peng	6	6
(Japan) K Date-Krumm (Spain) A Parra Santonja	6^{2}	7^{7}	[4]
(United States) L Huber (Spain) N Llagostera Vives	7^{7}	6^{4}	[10]
WC	(United States) V King (Russia) A Kleybanova	2	1
2	(Russia) E Makarova (Russia) E Vesnina	6	6

Quarterfinals
7	(Chinese Taipei) H-c Chan (Slovenia) K Srebotnik	3	2
3	(Chinese Taipei) S-w Hsieh (China) S Peng	6	6
(United States) L Huber (Spain) N Llagostera Vives	2	5
2	(Russia) E Makarova (Russia) E Vesnina	6	7

Semifinals
3	(Chinese Taipei) S-w Hsieh (China) S Peng	6	3	[10]
2	(Russia) E Makarova (Russia) E Vesnina	1	6	[3]
