= Raquel Atawo =

American tennis player

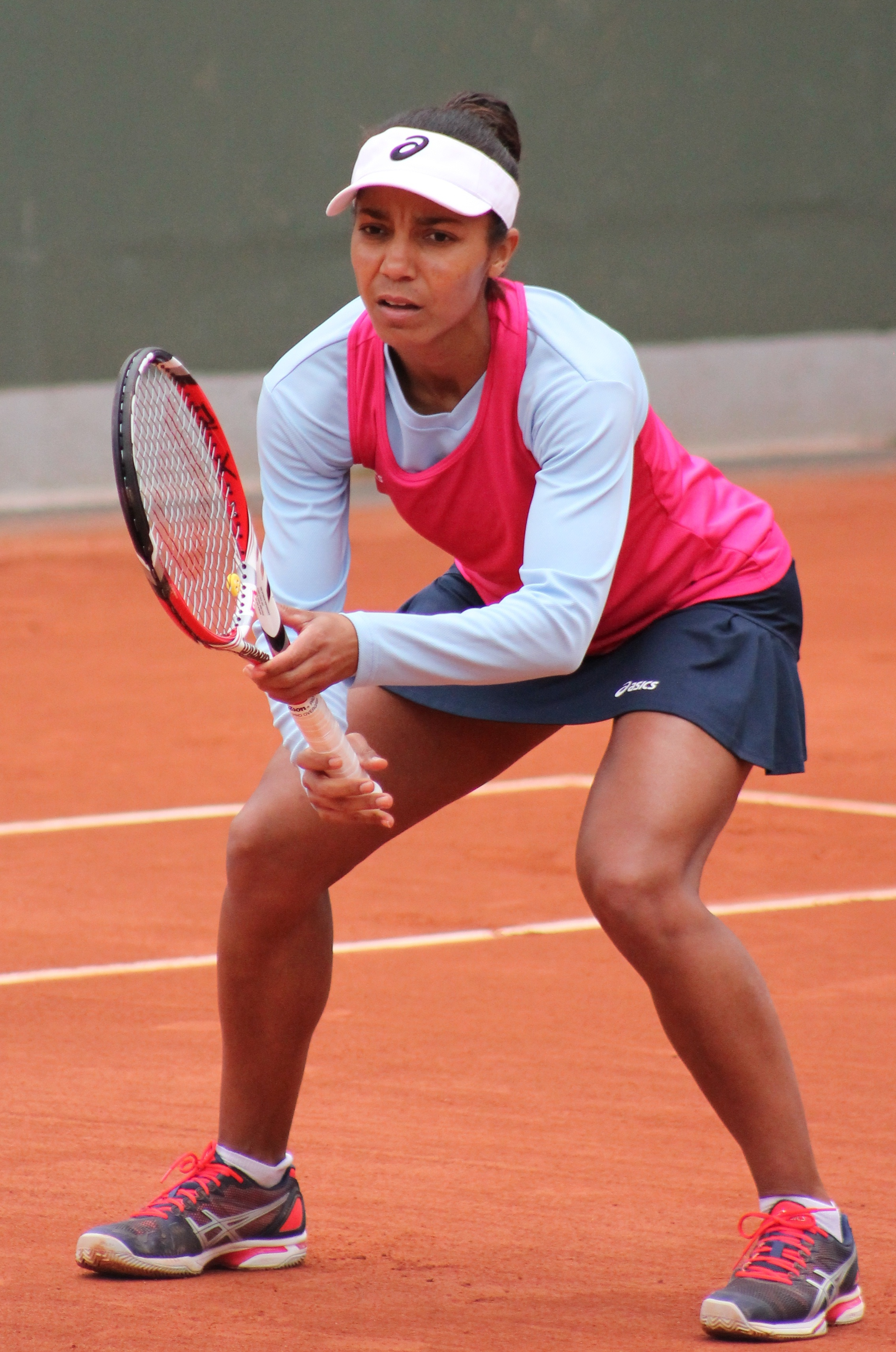
- Country (sports): United States
- Residence: Fresno, California, U.S.
- Born: December 8, 1982 (age 43) Fresno, California, U.S.
- Height: 1.70 m (5 ft 7 in)
- Turned pro: 2000
- Retired: 2019
- Plays: Right-handed (two-handed backhand)
- Prize money: $2,345,304

Singles
- Career record: 144–138
- Career titles: 0 WTA, 2 ITF
- Highest ranking: No. 162 (October 8, 2007)

Grand Slam singles results
- Australian Open: Q2 (2007)
- French Open: Q2 (2007)
- Wimbledon: Q1 (2007, 2008)
- US Open: Q3 (2007)

Doubles
- Career record: 457–327
- Career titles: 18 WTA, 18 ITF
- Highest ranking: No. 10 (March 2, 2015)

Grand Slam doubles results
- Australian Open: SF (2014)
- French Open: 3R (2008)
- Wimbledon: SF (2015, 2016)
- US Open: QF (2008)

Grand Slam mixed doubles results
- Australian Open: QF (2010)
- French Open: 3R (2014)
- Wimbledon: 2R (2013, 2014, 2016, 2019)
- US Open: QF (2019)

Raquel Atawo (née Kops-Jones; born December 8, 1982) is an American former professional tennis player, who is currently the head women's tennis coach for the Purdue Boilermakers.

She is primarily a doubles specialist, winning 18 WTA doubles titles, including two Premier-5 titles at the 2012 Toray Pan Pacific Open and the 2014 Cincinnati Masters, and reaching the semifinals of the 2014 Australian Open, 2015 Wimbledon Championships and 2016 Wimbledon Championships, all alongside her regular partner, fellow American Abigail Spears.

Before serving as the head coach at Washington State, Atawo was an assistant women's tennis coach for Auburn University and a volunteer coach for University of California women's tennis.

== Biography ==
Raquel's mother is Nancy Kops, and her father was Lawrence Jones. She has two sisters, Renee and Khristy. She married Toby Atawo on July 18, 2015.

== Career ==
Her best results in doubles at Grand Slam events have been reaching the semifinals at the Australian Open in 2014 and Wimbledon in 2015 and 2016, both while partnered with Abigail Spears. Kops-Jones has a career-high doubles ranking of No. 10, achieved on March 2, 2015. She won 18 WTA doubles titles.

In 2008, she played for the Boston Lobsters, and in 2019, played for the Philadelphia Freedoms—both teams in the World TeamTennis Pro League.

=== 2012 ===
Kops-Jones and compatriot Abigail Spears were one of the most successful doubles teams of the 2012 season, winning four titles, at Carlsbad, Seoul, Tokyo, and Osaka. The pair also reached two other finals and the quarterfinals of Wimbledon.

== Significant finals ==
=== Premier Mandatory/Premier 5 tournaments ===
==== Doubles: 3 (2 titles, 1 runner-up) ====
Result	Year	Tournament	Surface	Partner	Opponents	Score
Loss	2012	Qatar Open	Hard	(United States) Abigail Spears	(United States) Liezel Huber (United States) Lisa Raymond	3–6, 1–6
Win	2012	Tokyo Open	Hard	(United States) Abigail Spears	(Germany) Anna-Lena Grönefeld (Czech Republic) Květa Peschke	6–1, 6–4
Win	2014	Cincinnati Open	Hard	(United States) Abigail Spears	(Hungary) Tímea Babos (France) Kristina Mladenovic	6–1, 2–0 ret.

== WTA Tour finals ==
=== Doubles: 26 (18 titles, 8 runner-ups) ===
Winner — Legend
Grand Slam tournaments (0–0)
Tier I / Premier M & Premier 5 (2–1)
Tier II / Premier (9–4)
Tier III, IV & V / International (7–3)

Result	No.	Date	Tournament	Surface	Partner	Opponents	Score
Win	1.	Nov 2007	Bell Challenge, Quebec City	Hard	(United States) Christina Fusano	(Canada) Stéphanie Dubois (Czech Republic) Renata Voráčová	6–3, 7–6^{(8–6)}
Win	2.	May 2009	Estoril Open, Portugal	Clay	(United States) Abigail Spears	(Canada) Sharon Fichman (Hungary) Katalin Marosi	2–6, 6–3, [10–5]
Win	3.	May 2009	Warsaw Open, Poland	Clay	(United States) Bethanie Mattek-Sands	(China) Yan Zi (China) Zheng Jie	6–1, 6–1
Loss	1.	Jun 2009	Birmingham Classic, UK	Grass	(United States) Abigail Spears	(Zimbabwe) Cara Black (United States) Liezel Huber	1–6, 4–6
Loss	2.	Aug 2011	San Diego Open, United States	Hard	(United States) Abigail Spears	(Czech Republic) Květa Peschke (Slovenia) Katarina Srebotnik	0–6, 2–6
Win	4.	Sep 2011	Bell Challenge, Canada (2)	Hard	(United States) Abigail Spears	(United States) Jamie Hampton (Georgia (country)) Anna Tatishvili	6–0, 3–6, [10–6]
Loss	3.	Jan 2012	Brisbane International, Australia	Hard	(United States) Abigail Spears	(Spain) Nuria Llagostera Vives (Spain) Arantxa Parra Santonja	6–7^{(2–7)}, 6–7^{(2–7)}
Loss	4.	Feb 2012	Qatar Ladies Open, Doha	Hard	(United States) Abigail Spears	(United States) Liezel Huber (United States) Lisa Raymond	3–6, 1–6
Win	5.	Jul 2012	San Diego Open, US	Hard	(United States) Abigail Spears	(United States) Vania King (Russia) Nadia Petrova	6–2, 6–4
Win	6.	Sep 2012	Korea Open, Seoul	Hard	(United States) Abigail Spears	(Uzbekistan) Akgul Amanmuradova (United States) Vania King	2–6, 6–2, [10–8]
Win	7.	Sep 2012	Pan Pacific Open, Tokyo	Hard	(United States) Abigail Spears	(Germany) Anna-Lena Grönefeld (Czech Republic) Květa Peschke	6–1, 6–4
Win	8.	Oct 2012	Osaka Open, Japan	Hard	(United States) Abigail Spears	(Japan) Kimiko Date-Krumm (United Kingdom) Heather Watson	6–1, 6–4
Win	9.	Jul 2013	Stanford Classic, US	Hard	(United States) Abigail Spears	(Germany) Julia Görges (Croatia) Darija Jurak	6–2, 7–6^{(7–4)}
Win	10.	Aug 2013	San Diego Open, US (2)	Hard	(United States) Abigail Spears	(Chinese Taipei) Chan Hao-ching (Slovakia) Janette Husárová	6–4, 6–1
Loss	5.	Sep 2013	Korea Open, South Korea	Hard	(United States) Abigail Spears	(Chinese Taipei) Chan Chin-wei (China) Xu Yifan	5–7, 3–6
Loss	6.	Feb 2014	Dubai Tennis Championships, U.A.E.	Hard	(United States) Abigail Spears	(Russia) Alla Kudryavtseva (Australia) Anastasia Rodionova	2–6, 7–5, [8–10]
Win	11.	Jun 2014	Birmingham Classic, UK	Grass	(United States) Abigail Spears	(Australia) Ashleigh Barty (Australia) Casey Dellacqua	7–6^{(7–1)}, 6–1
Win	12.	Aug 2014	Cincinnati Open, US	Hard	(United States) Abigail Spears	(Hungary) Tímea Babos (France) Kristina Mladenovic	6–1, 2–0 ret.
Loss	7.	Jan 2015	Sydney International, Australia	Hard	(United States) Abigail Spears	(United States) Bethanie Mattek-Sands (India) Sania Mirza	3–6, 3–6
Win	13.	Feb 2015	Qatar Ladies Open, Doha	Hard	(United States) Abigail Spears	(Chinese Taipei) Hsieh Su-wei (India) Sania Mirza	6–4, 6–4
Win	14.	Jun 2015	Nottingham Open, UK	Grass	(United States) Abigail Spears	(United Kingdom) Jocelyn Rae (United Kingdom) Anna Smith	3–6, 6–3, [11–9]
Win	15.	Oct 2015	Ladies Linz, Austria	Hard (i)	(United States) Abigail Spears	(Czech Republic) Andrea Hlaváčková (Czech Republic) Lucie Hradecká	6–3, 7–5
Win	16.	Jul 2016	Stanford Classic, US (2)	Hard	(United States) Abigail Spears	(Croatia) Darija Jurak (Australia) Anastasia Rodionova	6–3, 6–4
Win	17.	Apr 2017	Porsche Tennis Grand Prix, Stuttgart	Clay (i)	(Latvia) Jeļena Ostapenko	(United States) Abigail Spears (Slovenia) Katarina Srebotnik	6–4, 6–4
Win	18.	Apr 2018	Porsche Tennis Grand Prix, Stuttgart (2)	Clay (i)	(Germany) Anna-Lena Grönefeld	(United States) Nicole Melichar (Czech Republic) Květa Peschke	6–4, 6–7^{(5–7)}, [10–5]
Loss	8.	Oct 2018	Linz Open, Austria (2)	Hard (i)	(Germany) Anna-Lena Grönefeld	(Belgium) Kirsten Flipkens (Sweden) Johanna Larsson	6–4, 4–6, [5–10]

== Doubles performance timeline ==
Key
W	F	SF	QF	#R	RR	Q#	P#	DNQ	A	Z#	PO	G	S	B	NMS	NTI	P	NH

(W) winner; (F) finalist; (SF) semifinalist; (QF) quarterfinalist; (#R) rounds 4, 3, 2, 1; (RR) round-robin stage; (Q#) qualification round; (P#) preliminary round; (DNQ) did not qualify; (A) absent; (Z#) Davis/Fed Cup Zonal Group (with number indication) or (PO) play-off; (G) gold, (S) silver or (B) bronze Olympic/Paralympic medal; (NMS) not a Masters tournament; (NTI) not a Tier I tournament; (P) postponed; (NH) not held; (SR) strike rate (events won / competed); (W–L) win–loss record.

Tournament	2003	2004	2005	2006	2007	2008	2009	2010	2011	2012	2013	2014	2015	2016	2017	2018	2019	SR	W–L
Grand Slam tournaments
Australian Open	A	A	A	A	A	A	2R	2R	3R	1R	2R	SF	QF	2R	QF	3R	QF	0 / 11	21–11
French Open	A	A	A	A	A	3R	1R	1R	1R	2R	1R	2R	1R	2R	1R	2R	2R	0 / 12	7–12
Wimbledon	A	A	A	A	1R	3R	1R	1R	2R	QF	3R	3R	SF	SF	1R	2R	2R	0 / 13	20–13
US Open	1R	1R	A	A	A	QF	1R	1R	1R	3R	2R	1R	3R	1R	2R	3R	1R	0 / 14	11–14
Win–loss	0–1	0–1	0–0	0–0	0–1	7–3	1–4	1–4	3–4	6–4	4–4	7–4	9–4	6–4	4–4	6–4	5–4	0 / 50	59–50
Premier Mandatory tournaments
Indian Wells	A	A	A	A	A	2R	2R	2R	2R	1R	1R	2R	1R	QF	1R	2R	2R	0 / 12	9–12
Miami	A	A	A	A	A	A	QF	1R	1R	1R	1R	SF	1R	A	2R	QF	1R	0 / 10	8–10
Madrid	Not Held						1R	1R	1R	1R	QF	QF	2R	1R	1R	1R	1R	0 / 11	4–11
Beijing	NH	Tier II					2R	A	QF	QF	QF	QF	1R	1R	1R	2R	A	0 / 9	9–9
Premier 5 tournaments
Dubai	Tier II						2R	1R	1R	Premier			1R	P	1R	P	1R	0 / 6	0–6
Doha	T III	Tier II				A	Not Held		P	F	SF	2R	P	2R	P	1R	P	0 / 5	8–5
Rome	A	A	A	A	A	A	A	1R	2R	1R	1R	1R	1R	QF	A	SF	1R	0 / 9	5–9
Montreal/Toronto	A	A	A	A	A	A	A	A	2R	2R	QF	QF	2R	2R	2R	1R	A	0 / 8	9–8
Cincinnati	NH	Tier III					A	1R	1R	2R	1R	W	2R	QF	2R	1R	1R	1 / 10	10–9
Tokyo	A	A	A	A	A	A	QF	A	QF	W	1R	Premier						1 / 4	6–3
Wuhan	Not Held											SF	QF	QF	2R	1R	A	0 / 5	7–5
Career statistics
Tournaments played	2	1	ITF only		6	9	23	25	26	25	24	22	25	24	23	23	19		
Titles	0	0	ITF only		1	0	2	0	1	4	2	2	3	1	1	1	0	18	
Finals reached	0	0	ITF only		1	0	3	0	2	6	3	3	4	1	1	2	0	26	
Overall win–loss	0–2	0–1	ITF only		5–5	10–9	21–21	12–25	25–25	42–21	27–22	38–20	33–23	30–23	19–21	23–22	13–18	298–258	
Year-end ranking	620	677	312	152	93	55	36	63	37	13	23	12	18	21	34	26	57		
