= 2018 Wuhan Open – Doubles =

Doubles
- 2018 Wuhan Open

Final
- Champions: (Belgium) Elise Mertens (Netherlands) Demi Schuurs
- Runners-up: (Czech Republic) Andrea Sestini Hlaváčková (Czech Republic) Barbora Strýcová
- Score: 6–3, 6–3

Details
- Draw: 28
- Seeds: 8

Events
Singles	Doubles
- Wuhan Open

Latisha Chan and Martina Hingis were the defending champions, but Hingis retired from professional tennis at the end of 2017 and Chan could not participate due to a medical condition.

Elise Mertens and Demi Schuurs won the title, defeating Andrea Sestini Hlaváčková and Barbora Strýcová in the final, 6–3, 6–3.

== Seeds ==
The top four seeds received a bye into the second round.

1. (Hungary) Tímea Babos / (France) Kristina Mladenovic (quarterfinals)
2. (Czech Republic) Andrea Sestini Hlaváčková / (Czech Republic) Barbora Strýcová (final)
3. (Australia) Ashleigh Barty / (United States) CoCo Vandeweghe (second round, retired)
4. (Canada) Gabriela Dabrowski / (China) Xu Yifan (quarterfinals)
5. (Slovenia) Andreja Klepač / (Spain) María José Martínez Sánchez (first round)
6. (Belgium) Elise Mertens / (Netherlands) Demi Schuurs (champions)
7. (United States) Nicole Melichar / (Czech Republic) Květa Peschke (quarterfinals)
8. (Czech Republic) Lucie Hradecká / (Russia) Ekaterina Makarova (second round)

== Draw ==
Key

- Q = Qualifier
- WC = Wild card
- LL = Lucky loser
- Alt = Alternate
- ITF = ITF entry
- PR = Protected ranking
- SR = Special ranking
- SE = Special exempt
- JE = Junior exempt
- JR = Junior Accelerator Programme entrant
- CO = College Accelerator Programme entrant
- NG = Next Gen Accelerator Program entrant
- w/o = Walkover
- r = Retired
- d = Defaulted

=== Finals ===
Semifinals
(Japan) Shuko Aoyama (Belarus) Lidziya Marozava	6	2	[3]
6	(Belgium) Elise Mertens (Netherlands) Demi Schuurs	4	6	[10]
(Russia) Anastasia Pavlyuchenkova (Latvia) Anastasija Sevastova
2	(Czech Republic) Andrea Sestini Hlaváčková (Czech Republic) Barbora Strýcová	w/o

Final
6	(Belgium) Elise Mertens (Netherlands) Demi Schuurs	6	6
2	(Czech Republic) Andrea Sestini Hlaváčková (Czech Republic) Barbora Strýcová	3	3

=== Top half ===
First round
(United States) K Christian (United States) S Santamaria	6	6
(United Kingdom) J Konta (China) S Zhang	2	1
(Japan) S Aoyama (Belarus) L Marozava	6	6
(Ukraine) N Kichenok (Australia) An Rodionova	4	3
(Latvia) J Ostapenko (Belarus) A Sabalenka	6	6
5	(Slovenia) A Klepač (Spain) MJ Martínez Sánchez	3	2
(Australia) D Gavrilova (China) S Zheng	6	4	[10]
(Poland) A Rosolska (United States) A Spears	4	6	[7]
(Netherlands) K Bertens (Belgium) K Flipkens	2	4
(Ukraine) L Kichenok (Slovenia) K Srebotnik	6	6
(United States) R Atawo (Germany) A-L Grönefeld	5	2
6	(Belgium) E Mertens (Netherlands) D Schuurs	7	6

Second round
1	(Hungary) T Babos (France) K Mladenovic	6	6
(United States) K Christian (United States) S Santamaria	2	2
(Japan) S Aoyama (Belarus) L Marozava	6	6
(Latvia) J Ostapenko (Belarus) A Sabalenka	4	2
4	(Canada) G Dabrowski (China) Y Xu	6	6
(Australia) D Gavrilova (China) S Zheng	0	3
(Ukraine) L Kichenok (Slovenia) K Srebotnik	4	6	[1]
6	(Belgium) E Mertens (Netherlands) D Schuurs	6	2	[10]

Quarterfinals
1	(Hungary) T Babos (France) K Mladenovic	2	5
(Japan) S Aoyama (Belarus) L Marozava	6	7
4	(Canada) G Dabrowski (China) Y Xu	4	3
6	(Belgium) E Mertens (Netherlands) D Schuurs	6	6

Semifinals
(Japan) S Aoyama (Belarus) L Marozava	6	2	[3]
6	(Belgium) E Mertens (Netherlands) D Schuurs	4	6	[10]

=== Bottom half ===
First round
8	(Czech Republic) L Hradecká (Russia) E Makarova	6^{4}	6	[11]
WC	(China) X Jiang (China) Q Wang	7^{7}	4	[9]
(Spain) L Arruabarrena (Croatia) D Jurak	4	3
(Russia) A Pavlyuchenkova (Latvia) A Sevastova	6	6
WC	(China) Y Duan (China) Y Wang	0	7^{7}	[10]
(Switzerland) B Bencic (France) A Cornet	6	6^{2}	[6]
7	(United States) N Melichar (Czech Republic) K Peschke	7^{7}	2	[10]
(Chinese Taipei) H-c Chan (China) Z Yang	6^{4}	6	[5]
(Serbia) A Krunić (Czech Republic) K Siniaková	4	2
(United States) V King (Romania) M Niculescu	6	6
(Chinese Taipei) S-w Hsieh (United States) B Mattek-Sands	6	6
(Japan) M Kato (Japan) M Ninomiya	2	2

Second round
8	(Czech Republic) L Hradecká (Russia) E Makarova	4	6^{4}
(Russia) A Pavlyuchenkova (Latvia) A Sevastova	6	7^{7}
WC	(China) Y Duan (China) Y Wang	3
3	(Australia) A Barty (United States) C Vandeweghe	3^{r}
7	(United States) N Melichar (Czech Republic) K Peschke	w/o
(United States) V King (Romania) M Niculescu
(Chinese Taipei) S-w Hsieh (United States) B Mattek-Sands	6^{1}	6	[7]
2	(Czech Republic) A Sestini Hlaváčková (Czech Republic) B Strýcová	7^{7}	2	[10]

Quarterfinals
(Russia) A Pavlyuchenkova (Latvia) A Sevastova	7	4	[10]
WC	(China) Y Duan (China) Y Wang	5	6	[5]
7	(United States) N Melichar (Czech Republic) K Peschke	5	4
2	(Czech Republic) A Sestini Hlaváčková (Czech Republic) B Strýcová	7	6

Semifinals
(Russia) A Pavlyuchenkova (Latvia) A Sevastova
2	(Czech Republic) A Sestini Hlaváčková (Czech Republic) B Strýcová	w/o
