= 2011 Western & Southern Open – Women's doubles =

Women's doubles
- 2011 Western & Southern Open

Final
- Champions: (United States) Vania King (Kazakhstan) Yaroslava Shvedova
- Runners-up: (South Africa) Natalie Grandin (Czech Republic) Vladimíra Uhlířová
- Score: 6–4, 3–6, [11–9]

Details
- Seeds: 8

Events
Singles	men	women
Doubles	men	women
← 2010 ·	Western & Southern Open	· 2012 →

Victoria Azarenka and Maria Kirilenko were the defending women's doubles champions. Azarenka chose not to participate while Kirilenko played with Nadia Petrova. They were defeated in the quarterfinals by Natalie Grandin and Vladimíra Uhlířová.
Vania King and Yaroslava Shvedova won the title, defeating Natalie Grandin and Vladimíra Uhlířová 6–4, 3–6, [11–9] in the final.

== Seeds ==
The top four seeds received a bye into the second round.

1. (Czech Republic) Květa Peschke / (Slovenia) Katarina Srebotnik (semifinals)
2. (Argentina) Gisela Dulko / (Italy) Flavia Pennetta (quarterfinals)
3. (United States) Vania King / (Kazakhstan) Yaroslava Shvedova (champions)
4. (Russia) Maria Kirilenko / (Russia) Nadia Petrova (quarterfinals)
5. (United States) Liezel Huber / (United States) Lisa Raymond (quarterfinals)
6. (Czech Republic) Iveta Benešová / (Czech Republic) Barbora Záhlavová-Strýcová (first round)
7. (Czech Republic) Andrea Hlaváčková / (Czech Republic) Lucie Hradecká (second round)
8. (Chinese Taipei) Chan Yung-Jan / (Australia) Anastasia Rodionova (first round)

== Draw ==
=== Key ===
- Q = Qualifier
- WC = Wild card
- LL = Lucky loser
- Alt = Alternate
- SE = Special exempt
- PR = Protected ranking
- ITF = ITF entry
- JE = Junior exempt
- w/o = Walkover
- r = Retired
- d = Defaulted
- SR = Special ranking

=== Finals ===
Semifinals
1	(Czech Republic) Květa Peschke (Slovenia) Katarina Srebotnik	1	4
(South Africa) Natalie Grandin (Czech Republic) Vladimíra Uhlířová	6	6
3	(United States) Vania King (Kazakhstan) Yaroslava Shvedova	6	6
(Russia) Ekaterina Makarova (China) Zheng Jie	1	3

Final
(South Africa) Natalie Grandin (Czech Republic) Vladimíra Uhlířová	4	6	[9]
3	(United States) Vania King (Kazakhstan) Yaroslava Shvedova	6	3	[11]

=== Top half ===
First round
(Chinese Taipei) C-j Chuang (Belarus) O Govortsova	5	1
(Australia) C Dellacqua (Russia) A Kudryavtseva	7	6
(United States) R Kops-Jones (United States) A Spears	5	6	[8]
WC	(United States) S Stephens (Belgium) Y Wickmayer	7	2	[10]
(Italy) S Errani (Italy) R Vinci	6	6
6	(Czech Republic) I Benešová (Czech Republic) B Záhlavová-Strýcová	2	3
WC	(Germany) J Görges (Russia) S Kuznetsova	7^{7}	1	[10]
WC	(Germany) A Petkovic (Italy) F Schiavone	6^{5}	6	[5]
(South Africa) N Grandin (Czech Republic) V Uhlířová	3	6	[10]
(Germany) K Barrois (Czech Republic) K Zakopalová	6	3	[5]
(Italy) A Brianti (Romania) A Dulgheru	4	5
7	(Czech Republic) A Hlaváčková (Czech Republic) L Hradecká	6	7

Second round
1	(Czech Republic) K Peschke (Slovenia) K Srebotnik	6	6
(Australia) C Dellacqua (Russia) A Kudryavtseva	2	3
WC	(United States) S Stephens (Belgium) Y Wickmayer	6	2	[4]
(Italy) S Errani (Italy) R Vinci	4	6	[10]
4	(Russia) M Kirilenko (Russia) N Petrova	6	7
WC	(Germany) J Görges (Russia) S Kuznetsova	4	5
(South Africa) N Grandin (Czech Republic) V Uhlířová	2	7^{7}	[10]
7	(Czech Republic) A Hlaváčková (Czech Republic) L Hradecká	6	6^{3}	[7]

Quarterfinals
1	(Czech Republic) K Peschke (Slovenia) K Srebotnik	6	6
(Italy) S Errani (Italy) R Vinci	2	2
4	(Russia) M Kirilenko (Russia) N Petrova	5	7	[2]
(South Africa) N Grandin (Czech Republic) V Uhlířová	7	5	[10]

Semifinals
1	(Czech Republic) K Peschke (Slovenia) K Srebotnik	1	4
(South Africa) N Grandin (Czech Republic) V Uhlířová	6	6

=== Bottom half ===
First round
5	(United States) L Huber (United States) L Raymond	6	6
(Romania) M Niculescu (Israel) S Pe'er	1	3
Alt	(Greece) E Daniilidou (Slovenia) P Hercog	3	6	[10]
(Slovakia) D Hantuchová (Germany) S Lisicki	6	1	[8]
(Spain) MJ Martínez Sánchez (Spain) A Medina Garrigues	6^{2}	6	[10]
WC	(United States) A Glatch (United States) C McHale	7^{7}	0	[12]
8	(Chinese Taipei) Y-j Chan (Australia) A Rodionova	7	4	[7]
(Sweden) J Larsson (Germany) J Wöhr	5	6	[10]
(Chinese Taipei) S-w Hsieh (Kazakhstan) G Voskoboeva	7	2	[7]
(Russia) Ek Makarova (China) J Zheng	5	6	[10]
(Poland) K Jans-Ignacik (Poland) A Rosolska	3	7^{7}	[10]
(Spain) N Llagostera Vives (Spain) A Parra Santonja	6	6^{4}	[3]

Second round
5	(United States) L Huber (United States) L Raymond	6	7^{7}
Alt	(Greece) E Daniilidou (Slovenia) P Hercog	3	6^{4}
WC	(United States) A Glatch (United States) C McHale	6	4	[5]
3	(United States) V King (Kazakhstan) Y Shvedova	3	6	[10]
(Sweden) J Larsson (Germany) J Wöhr	5	3
(Russia) Ek Makarova (China) J Zheng	7	6
(Poland) K Jans-Ignacik (Poland) A Rosolska	2	4
2	(Argentina) G Dulko (Italy) F Pennetta	6	6

Quarterfinals
5	(United States) L Huber (United States) L Raymond	6^{5}	4
3	(United States) V King (Kazakhstan) Y Shvedova	7^{7}	6
(Russia) Ek Makarova (China) J Zheng	6	5	[10]
2	(Argentina) G Dulko (Italy) F Pennetta	4	7	[7]

Semifinals
3	(United States) V King (Kazakhstan) Y Shvedova	6	6
(Russia) Ek Makarova (China) J Zheng	1	3
