= 2012 Western & Southern Open – Men's singles =

Men's singles
- 2012 Western & Southern Open

Final
- Champion: (Switzerland) Roger Federer
- Runner-up: (Serbia) Novak Djokovic
- Score: 6–0, 7–6^{(9–7)}

Details
- Draw: 56
- Seeds: 16

Events
| Singles | men | women |
| Doubles | men | women |
- Western & Southern Open

Roger Federer defeated Novak Djokovic in the final, 6–0, 7–6^{(9–7)} to win the men's singles tennis title at the 2012 Cincinnati Masters. It was his record fifth Cincinnati Masters title, and marked the first time that a player won an ATP Masters 1000 event without having their serve broken or losing a set (a feat Federer would repeat at the 2015 event). It was Djokovic's fourth runner-up finish at the tournament.

Andy Murray was the defending champion, but lost in the third round to Jérémy Chardy.

== Seeds ==
The top eight seeds receive a bye into the second round.

1. (Switzerland) Roger Federer (champion)
2. (Serbia) Novak Djokovic (final)
3. (United Kingdom) Andy Murray (third round)
4. (Spain) David Ferrer (second round)
5. (Czech Republic) Tomáš Berdych (third round)
6. (Argentina) Juan Martín del Potro (semifinals)
7. (Serbia) Janko Tipsarević (second round, retired because of a virus)
8. (Argentina) Juan Mónaco (second round)
9. (United States) ~~John Isner~~ (withdrew because of a back injury)
10. (United States) Mardy Fish (quarterfinals)
11. (France) ~~Gilles Simon~~ (withdrew because of a shoulder injury)
12. (Croatia) Marin Čilić (quarterfinals)
13. (Ukraine) Alexandr Dolgopolov (first round)
14. (Japan) Kei Nishikori (third round)
15. (Germany) Philipp Kohlschreiber (first round)
16. (United States) Andy Roddick (first round)

== Draw ==
Key

- Q = Qualifier
- WC = Wild card
- LL = Lucky loser
- Alt = Alternate
- ITF = ITF entry
- PR = Protected ranking
- SR = Special ranking
- SE = Special exempt
- JE = Junior exempt
- JR = Junior Accelerator Programme entrant
- CO = College Accelerator Programme entrant
- NG = Next Gen Accelerator Program entrant
- w/o = Walkover
- r = Retired
- d = Defaulted

=== Finals ===
Quarterfinals
1 | (Switzerland) Roger Federer | 6 | 7^{7}
10 | (United States) Mardy Fish | 3 | 6^{4}
(Switzerland) Stan Wawrinka | 2 | 7^{7} | 6
(Canada) Milos Raonic | 6 | 6^{5} | 4
6 | (Argentina) Juan Martín del Potro | 6 | 6
LL | (France) Jérémy Chardy | 1 | 3
12 | (Croatia) Marin Čilić | 3 | 2
2 | (Serbia) Novak Djokovic | 6 | 6

Semifinals
1 | (Switzerland) Roger Federer | 7^{7} | 6
(Switzerland) Stan Wawrinka | 6^{4} | 3
6 | (Argentina) Juan Martín del Potro | 3 | 2
2 | (Serbia) Novak Djokovic | 6 | 6

Final
1 | (Switzerland) Roger Federer | 6 | 7^{9}
2 | (Serbia) Novak Djokovic | 0 | 6^{7}

=== Top half ===
==== Section 1 ====
First round
(Finland) J Nieminen | 4 | 3
(Russia) A Bogomolov Jr. | 6 | 6
(United States) R Harrison | 4 | 6^{5}
(Australia) B Tomic | 6 | 7^{7}
WC | (United States) B Baker | 7^{9} | 7^{7}
15 | (Germany) P Kohlschreiber | 6^{7} | 6^{3}
10 | (United States) M Fish | 6 | 6
(Spain) F López | 2 | 3
(Colombia) S Giraldo | 5 | 3
(Argentina) C Berlocq | 7 | 6
(Czech Republic) R Štěpánek | 6 | 6
(Spain) A Ramos | 2 | 2

Second round
1 | (Switzerland) R Federer | 6 | 6
(Russia) A Bogomolov Jr. | 3 | 2
(Australia) B Tomic | 6 | 6
WC | (United States) B Baker | 4 | 3
10 | (United States) M Fish | 6 | 6
(Argentina) C Berlocq | 3 | 1
(Czech Republic) R Štěpánek | 7^{7} | 6
8 | (Argentina) J Mónaco | 6^{2} | 1

Third round
1 | (Switzerland) R Federer | 6 | 6
(Australia) B Tomic | 2 | 4
10 | (United States) M Fish | 6 | 6
(Czech Republic) R Štěpánek | 3 | 3

Quarterfinals
1 | (Switzerland) R Federer | 6 | 7^{7}
10 | (United States) M Fish | 3 | 6^{4}

==== Section 2 ====
First round
Q | (France) P-H Mathieu | 2 | 6 | 1
(Switzerland) S Wawrinka | 6 | 3 | 6
(South Africa) K Anderson | 5 | 4
WC | (United States) J Blake | 7 | 6
(Spain) M Granollers | 1 | 2
14 | (Japan) K Nishikori | 6 | 6
LL | (Colombia) A Falla | 4 | 1
(Cyprus) M Baghdatis | 6 | 6
(France) R Gasquet | 6^{4} | 3
(Canada) M Raonic | 7^{7} | 6
Q | (Chinese Taipei) Y-h Lu | 6 | 6
(Poland) Ł Kubot | 3 | 0

Second round
4 | (Spain) D Ferrer | 4 | 1
(Switzerland) S Wawrinka | 6 | 6
WC | (United States) J Blake | 6 | 4 | 4
14 | (Japan) K Nishikori | 2 | 6 | 6
(Cyprus) M Baghdatis | 7^{8} | 3 | 4
(Canada) M Raonic | 6^{6} | 6 | 6
Q | (Chinese Taipei) Y-h Lu | 3 | 4
5 | (Czech Republic) T Berdych | 6 | 6

Third round
(Switzerland) S Wawrinka | 6 | 6
14 | (Japan) K Nishikori | 3 | 3
(Canada) M Raonic | 6 | 2 | 6
5 | (Czech Republic) T Berdych | 4 | 6 | 2

Quarterfinals
(Switzerland) S Wawrinka | 2 | 7^{7} | 6
(Canada) M Raonic | 6 | 6^{5} | 4

=== Bottom half ===
==== Section 3 ====
First round
(Argentina) D Nalbandian | 7^{7} | 6^{4} | 3
(Germany) T Haas | 6^{0} | 7^{7} | 6
WC | (Australia) L Hewitt | 6 | 6
(Russia) M Youzhny | 4 | 4
(Serbia) V Troicki | 6 | 7
Q | (Croatia) I Dodig | 4 | 5
16 | (United States) A Roddick | 6^{4} | 3
LL | (France) J Chardy | 7^{7} | 6
(Uzbekistan) D Istomin | 6 | 6
(France) J Benneteau | 3 | 1
(Austria) J Melzer | 6 | 2 | 4
WC | (United States) S Querrey | 4 | 6 | 6

Second round
6 | (Argentina) JM del Potro | 7 | 6
(Germany) T Haas | 5 | 2
WC | (Australia) L Hewitt | 2 | 0
(Serbia) V Troicki | 6 | 6
LL | (France) J Chardy | 6 | 6
(Uzbekistan) D Istomin | 4 | 3
WC | (United States) S Querrey | 2 | 4
3 | (United Kingdom) A Murray | 6 | 6

Third round
6 | (Argentina) JM del Potro | 7^{7} | 2 | 6
(Serbia) V Troicki | 6^{2} | 6 | 1
LL | (France) J Chardy | 6 | 6
3 | (United Kingdom) A Murray | 4 | 4

Quarterfinals
6 | (Argentina) JM del Potro | 6 | 6
LL | (France) J Chardy | 1 | 3

==== Section 4 ====
First round
(Spain) P Andújar | 6 | 6
Q | (Australia) M Matosevic | 4 | 3
(United States) D Young | 4 | 6^{2}
Q | (United States) J Levine | 6 | 7^{7}
Q | (Ukraine) S Stakhovsky | 3 | 6 | 4
12 | (Croatia) M Čilić | 6 | 4 | 6
13 | (Ukraine) A Dolgopolov | 1 | 1
(Russia) N Davydenko | 6 | 6
Q | (Italy) F Fognini | 5 | 2
(Germany) F Mayer | 7 | 6
(Italy) A Seppi | 6 | 6
(Netherlands) R Haase | 4 | 4

Second round
7 | (Serbia) J Tipsarević | 4 | 1^{r}
(Spain) P Andújar | 6 | 4
Q | (United States) J Levine | 5 | 6^{6}
12 | (Croatia) M Čilić | 7 | 7^{8}
(Russia) N Davydenko | 6 | 6
(Germany) F Mayer | 3 | 3
(Italy) A Seppi | 6^{4} | 2
2 | (Serbia) N Djokovic | 7^{7} | 6

Third round
(Spain) P Andújar | 6^{4} | 2
12 | (Croatia) M Čilić | 7^{7} | 6
(Russia) N Davydenko | 0^{r}
2 | (Serbia) N Djokovic | 6

Quarterfinals
12 | (Croatia) M Čilić | 3 | 2
2 | (Serbia) N Djokovic | 6 | 6

== Qualifying ==
=== Seeds ===
1. (France) Jérémy Chardy (qualifying competition, lucky loser)
2. (Colombia) Alejandro Falla (qualifying competition, lucky loser)
3. (Bulgaria) Grigor Dimitrov (first round)
4. (Slovakia) Lukáš Lacko (first round)
5. (Belgium) David Goffin (qualifying competition)
6. (Australia) Marinko Matosevic (qualified)
7. (Argentina) Leonardo Mayer (qualifying competition)
8. (Italy) Fabio Fognini (qualified)
9. (Kazakhstan) Mikhail Kukushkin (withdrew because of a hip injury)
10. (Chinese Taipei) Lu Yen-hsun (qualified)
11. (Netherlands) Igor Sijsling (first round)
12. (Belgium) Steve Darcis (first round)
13. (Australia) Matthew Ebden (first round)
14. (Germany) Philipp Petzschner (first round)

=== Qualifiers ===
1. (Italy) Fabio Fognini
2. (Chinese Taipei) Lu Yen-hsun
3. (France) Paul-Henri Mathieu
4. (United States) Jesse Levine
5. (Croatia) Ivan Dodig
6. (Australia) Marinko Matosevic
7. (Ukraine) Sergiy Stakhovsky

=== Lucky losers ===
1. (France) Jérémy Chardy
2. (Colombia) Alejandro Falla

=== Draw ===
==== First qualifier ====
First round
1 | (France) Jérémy Chardy | 6 | 6
(United States) Robby Ginepri | 4 | 4
(Canada) Vasek Pospisil | 4 | 6^{5}
8 | (Italy) Fabio Fognini | 6 | 7^{7}

Qualifying competition
1 | (France) Jérémy Chardy | 6 | 1 | 6^{5}
8 | (Italy) Fabio Fognini | 3 | 6 | 7^{7}

==== Second qualifier ====
First round
2 | (Colombia) Alejandro Falla | 6 | 6
WC | (United States) Christian Harrison | 3 | 3
(Latvia) Ernests Gulbis | 3 | 2
10 | (Chinese Taipei) Lu Yen-hsun | 6 | 6

Qualifying competition
2 | (Colombia) Alejandro Falla | 5 | 1
10 | (Chinese Taipei) Lu Yen-hsun | 7 | 6

==== Third qualifier ====
First round
3 | (Bulgaria) Grigor Dimitrov | 6^{5} | 6^{3}
(United States) Rajeev Ram | 7^{7} | 7^{7}
PR | (France) Paul-Henri Mathieu | 4 | 6 | 7
13 | (Australia) Matthew Ebden | 6 | 1 | 5

Qualifying competition
(United States) Rajeev Ram | 1 | 6^{3}
PR | (France) Paul-Henri Mathieu | 6 | 7^{7}

==== Fourth qualifier ====
First round
4 | (Slovakia) Lukáš Lacko | 6 | 4 | 3
(United States) Jesse Levine | 4 | 6 | 6
WC | (United States) Jack Sock | 4 | 5
Alt | (Belgium) Olivier Rochus | 6 | 7

Qualifying competition
(United States) Jesse Levine | 6 | 6
Alt | (Belgium) Olivier Rochus | 4 | 3

==== Fifth qualifier ====
First round
5 | (Belgium) David Goffin | 6 | 2
(United States) Michael Russell | 4 | 3^{r}
(Croatia) Ivan Dodig | 6 | 6
14 | (Germany) Philipp Petzschner | 0 | 3

Qualifying competition
5 | (Belgium) David Goffin | 2 | 2
(Croatia) Ivan Dodig | 6 | 6

==== Sixth qualifier ====
First round
6 | (Australia) Marinko Matosevic | 3 | 6 | 6
(Germany) Benjamin Becker | 6 | 3 | 3
(Poland) Jerzy Janowicz | 6 | 6
12 | (Belgium) Steve Darcis | 3 | 1

Qualifying competition
6 | (Australia) Marinko Matosevic | 6 | 6
(Poland) Jerzy Janowicz | 0 | 2

==== Seventh qualifier ====
First round
7 | (Argentina) Leonardo Mayer | 6 | 6
(Russia) Igor Andreev | 3 | 1
(Ukraine) Sergiy Stakhovsky | 6 | 6
11 | (Netherlands) Igor Sijsling | 3 | 4

Qualifying competition
7 | (Argentina) Leonardo Mayer | 5 | 4
(Ukraine) Sergiy Stakhovsky | 7 | 6
