= 2012 Western & Southern Open – Women's singles =

Women's singles
- 2012 Western & Southern Open

Final
- Champion: (China) Li Na
- Runner-up: (Germany) Angelique Kerber
- Score: 1–6, 6–3, 6–1

Details
- Draw: 56
- Seeds: 16

Events
Singles	men	women
Doubles	men	women
- Western & Southern Open

Li Na defeated Angelique Kerber in the final, 1–6, 6–3, 6–1 to win the women's singles tennis title at the 2012 Cincinnati Masters.

Maria Sharapova was the reigning champion, but withdrew because of a stomach virus.

== Seeds ==
The top eight seeds and the Montreal finalists receive a bye into the second round.

1. (Poland) Agnieszka Radwańska (quarterfinals)
2. (United States) Serena Williams (quarterfinals)
3. (Australia) Samantha Stosur (quarterfinals)
4. (Czech Republic) Petra Kvitová (semifinals)
5. (Germany) Angelique Kerber (final)
6. (Denmark) Caroline Wozniacki (third round)
7. (Italy) Sara Errani (third round)
8. (France) Marion Bartoli (second round)
9. (China) Li Na (champion)
10. (Serbia) Ana Ivanovic (withdrew because of a right foot injury)
11. (Slovakia) Dominika Cibulková (second round, retired)
12. (Russia) Maria Kirilenko (first round)
13. (Serbia) Jelena Janković (first round)
14. (Italy) Francesca Schiavone (first round)
15. (Russia) Nadia Petrova (first round, retired because of dizziness)
16. (Czech Republic) Lucie Šafářová (first round)
17. (Russia) Anastasia Pavlyuchenkova (quarterfinals)

== Draw ==
Key

- Q = Qualifier
- WC = Wild card
- LL = Lucky loser
- Alt = Alternate
- ITF = ITF entry
- PR = Protected ranking
- SR = Special ranking
- SE = Special exempt
- JE = Junior exempt
- JR = Junior Accelerator Programme entrant
- CO = College Accelerator Programme entrant
- NG = Next Gen Accelerator Program entrant
- w/o = Walkover
- r = Retired
- d = Defaulted

=== Finals ===
Quarterfinals
1	(Poland) Agnieszka Radwańska	1	1
9	(China) Li Na	6	6
3	(Australia) Samantha Stosur	2	7^{7}	4
WC	(United States) Venus Williams	6	6^{2}	6
17	(Russia) Anastasia Pavlyuchenkova	3	6^{4}
4	(Czech Republic) Petra Kvitová	6	7^{7}
5	(Germany) Angelique Kerber	6	6
2	(United States) Serena Williams	4	4

Semifinals
9	(China) Li Na	7	3	6
WC	(United States) Venus Williams	5	6	1
4	(Czech Republic) Petra Kvitová	1	6	4
5	(Germany) Angelique Kerber	6	2	6

Final
9	(China) Li Na	1	6	6
5	(Germany) Angelique Kerber	6	3	1

=== Top half ===
==== Section 1 ====
First round
(Sweden) S Arvidsson	6	2
(Austria) T Paszek	1	1^{r}
(Bulgaria) T Pironkova	4	1
WC	(United States) S Stephens	6	6
WC	(Italy) C Giorgi	6	6
14	(Italy) F Schiavone	1	3
(Belgium) Y Wickmayer	7^{8}	2	3
(Romania) S Cîrstea	6^{6}	6	6
Q	(Sweden) J Larsson	6	6
Q	(Australia) C Dellacqua	1	3

Second round
1	(Poland) A Radwańska	6	6
(Sweden) S Arvidsson	4	3
WC	(United States) S Stephens	6	6
WC	(Italy) C Giorgi	2	1
9	(China) N Li	6	4	6
(Romania) S Cîrstea	3	6	3
Q	(Sweden) J Larsson	6	6
8	(France) M Bartoli	4	2

Third round
1	(Poland) A Radwańska	6	4	6
WC	(United States) S Stephens	1	6	4
9	(China) N Li	6	6
Q	(Sweden) J Larsson	2	2

Quarterfinals
1	(Poland) A Radwańska	1	1
9	(China) N Li	6	6

==== Section 2 ====
First round
(Romania) S Halep	3	0
(Spain) A Medina Garrigues	6	6
(Czech Republic) K Zakopalová	6^{5}	5
LL	(Georgia (country)) A Tatishvili	7^{7}	7
(Russia) E Makarova	7^{10}	3
15	(Russia) N Petrova	6^{8}	1^{r}
12	(Russia) M Kirilenko	3	7^{7}	2
WC	(United States) V Williams	6	6^{5}	6
(South Africa) C Scheepers	3	6	3
(United States) C McHale	6	3	0^{r}
(China) J Zheng	6	6^{1}	3
(Slovakia) D Hantuchová	2	7^{7}	6

Second round
3	(Australia) S Stosur	6	6^{6}	6
(Spain) A Medina Garrigues	3	7^{8}	4
LL	(Georgia (country)) A Tatishvili	1	2
(Russia) E Makarova	6	6
WC	(United States) V Williams	2	6	6
(South Africa) C Scheepers	6	3	2
(Slovakia) D Hantuchová	4	4
7	(Italy) S Errani	6	6

Third round
3	(Australia) S Stosur	6	6
(Russia) E Makarova	1	3
WC	(United States) V Williams	6	6
7	(Italy) S Errani	3	0

Quarterfinals
3	(Australia) S Stosur	2	7^{7}	4
WC	(United States) V Williams	6	6^{2}	6

=== Bottom half ===
==== Section 3 ====
First round
Q	(Kazakhstan) S Karatantcheva	6	6
Q	(Netherlands) K Bertens	2	1
(Israel) S Pe'er	3	3
(Germany) J Görges	6	6
(Spain) C Suárez Navarro	4	0
17	(Russia) A Pavlyuchenkova	6	6
13	(Serbia) J Janković	7	5	6^{8}
(China) S Peng	5	7	7^{10}
(Italy) R Vinci	6	6
Q	(United States) M Keys	3	3
(Spain) MJ Martínez Sánchez	0	4
(Germany) M Barthel	6	6

Second round
6	(Denmark) C Wozniacki	6	6
Q	(Kazakhstan) S Karatantcheva	1	0
(Germany) J Görges	3	0
17	(Russia) A Pavlyuchenkova	6	6
(China) S Peng	6	6
(Italy) R Vinci	3	4
(Germany) M Barthel	6	2	5
4	(Czech Republic) P Kvitová	3	6	7

Third round
6	(Denmark) C Wozniacki	4	4
17	(Russia) A Pavlyuchenkova	6	6
(China) S Peng	2	2
4	(Czech Republic) P Kvitová	6	6

Quarterfinals
17	(Russia) A Pavlyuchenkova	3	6^{4}
4	(Czech Republic) P Kvitová	6	7^{7}

==== Section 4 ====
First round
(United States) V Lepchenko	6^{4}	4
LL	(Hungary) T Babos	7^{7}	6
Q	(United States) B Mattek-Sands	3	5
Q	(Czech Republic) A Hlaváčková	6	7
Q	(Uzbekistan) A Amanmuradova	3	4
11	(Slovakia) D Cibulková	6	6
16	(Czech Republic) L Šafářová	3	4
Q	(Kazakhstan) Y Shvedova	6	6
(Kazakhstan) K Pervak	2	4
Q	(Poland) U Radwańska	6	6
Q	(United States) V King	3	6	6^{6}
Q	(Greece) E Daniilidou	6	2	7^{8}

Second round
5	(Germany) A Kerber	3	6	6
LL	(Hungary) T Babos	6	1	2
Q	(Czech Republic) A Hlaváčková	7^{7}	4
11	(Slovakia) D Cibulková	6^{1}	1^{r}
Q	(Kazakhstan) Y Shvedova	6	1^{r}
Q	(Poland) U Radwańska	4	4
Q	(Greece) E Daniilidou	3	4
2	(United States) S Williams	6	6

Third round
5	(Germany) A Kerber	6	7^{7}
Q	(Czech Republic) A Hlaváčková	4	6^{5}
Q	(Poland) U Radwańska	4	3
2	(United States) S Williams	6	6

Quarterfinals
5	(Germany) A Kerber	6	6
2	(United States) S Williams	4	4

== Qualifying draw ==
=== Seeds ===
1. (Kazakhstan) Yaroslava Shvedova (qualified)
2. (Poland) Urszula Radwańska (qualified)
3. (United States) Vania King (qualified)
4. (Kazakhstan) Galina Voskoboeva (withdrew)
5. (Czech Republic) Iveta Benešová (first round)
6. (Spain) Sílvia Soler Espinosa (first round)
7. (Netherlands) Arantxa Rus (first round)
8. (Hungary) Tímea Babos (qualifying competition, lucky loser)
9. (Czech Republic) Lucie Hradecká (first round)
10. (Serbia) Bojana Jovanovski (first round)
11. (United States) CoCo Vandeweghe (first round)
12. (Spain) Lourdes Domínguez Lino (first round)
13. (United Kingdom) Anne Keothavong (first round)
14. (Georgia (country)) Anna Tatishvili (qualifying competition, lucky loser)
15. (Netherlands) Kiki Bertens (qualified)
16. (Belarus) Olga Govortsova (qualifying competition)
17. (Romania) Irina-Camelia Begu (qualifying competition)
18. (Hungary) Melinda Czink (qualifying competition)
19. (United Kingdom) Laura Robson (qualifying competition)
20. (Czech Republic) Andrea Hlaváčková (qualified)
21. (France) Pauline Parmentier (first round)
22. (Sweden) Johanna Larsson (qualified)
23. (Ukraine) Kateryna Bondarenko (qualifying competition)
24. (Spain) Garbiñe Muguruza (first round)

=== Qualifiers ===
1. (Kazakhstan) Yaroslava Shvedova
2. (Poland) Urszula Radwańska
3. (United States) Vania King
4. (Uzbekistan) Akgul Amanmuradova
5. (Sweden) Johanna Larsson
6. (Netherlands) Kiki Bertens
7. (Kazakhstan) Sesil Karatantcheva
8. (United States) Madison Keys
9. (Australia) Casey Dellacqua
10. (Czech Republic) Andrea Hlaváčková
11. (Greece) Eleni Daniilidou
12. (United States) Bethanie Mattek-Sands

=== Lucky losers ===
1. (Hungary) Tímea Babos
2. (Georgia (country)) Anna Tatishvili

=== Draw ===
==== First qualifier ====
First round
1	(Kazakhstan) Yaroslava Shvedova	6	6
WC	(United States) Lauren Davis	3	2
WC	(United States) Nicole Gibbs	2	6^{8}
14	(Georgia (country)) Anna Tatishvili	6	7^{10}

Qualifying competition
1	(Kazakhstan) Yaroslava Shvedova	7	6
14	(Georgia (country)) Anna Tatishvili	5	2

==== Second qualifier ====
First round
2	(Poland) Urszula Radwańska	6	6
(Croatia) Mirjana Lučić	2	2
(Russia) Vera Dushevina	2	6	4
19	(United Kingdom) Laura Robson	6	3	6

Qualifying competition
2	(Poland) Urszula Radwańska	6	6
19	(United Kingdom) Laura Robson	3	2

==== Third qualifier ====
First round
3	(United States) Vania King	6	6
(Japan) Kimiko Date-Krumm	4	4
(United States) Julia Cohen	4	2
17	(Romania) Irina-Camelia Begu	6	6

Qualifying competition
3	(United States) Vania King	3	6	7
17	(Romania) Irina-Camelia Begu	6	3	5

==== Fourth qualifier ====
First round
Alt	(Slovakia) Jana Čepelová	3	1
(Czech Republic) Karolína Plíšková	6	6
(Uzbekistan) Akgul Amanmuradova	6	6
21	(France) Pauline Parmentier	4	3

Qualifying competition
(Czech Republic) Karolína Plíšková	3	2
(Uzbekistan) Akgul Amanmuradova	6	6

==== Fifth qualifier ====
First round
5	(Czech Republic) Iveta Benešová	1	7^{7}	3
(United States) Alexa Glatch	6	6^{2}	6
WC	(United States) Komal Safdar	1	1
22	(Sweden) Johanna Larsson	6	6

Qualifying competition
(United States) Alexa Glatch	2	2
22	(Sweden) Johanna Larsson	6	6

==== Sixth qualifier ====
First round
6	(Spain) Sílvia Soler Espinosa	3	5
(Kazakhstan) Yulia Putintseva	6	7
(France) Aravane Rezaï	3	7^{7}	4
15	(Netherlands) Kiki Bertens	6	6^{3}	6

Qualifying competition
(Kazakhstan) Yulia Putintseva	3	3
15	(Netherlands) Kiki Bertens	6	6

==== Seventh qualifier ====
First round
7	(Netherlands) Arantxa Rus	6	5	0
(Kazakhstan) Sesil Karatantcheva	3	7	6
WC	(United States) Jill Craybas	3	2
16	(Belarus) Olga Govortsova	6	6

Qualifying competition
(Kazakhstan) Sesil Karatantcheva	3	7	6
16	(Belarus) Olga Govortsova	6	5	0

==== Eighth qualifier ====
First round
8	(Hungary) Tímea Babos	6	6
(Ukraine) Lesia Tsurenko	2	4
WC	(United States) Madison Keys	7^{7}	3	6
24	(Spain) Garbiñe Muguruza	6^{5}	6	1

Qualifying competition
8	(Hungary) Tímea Babos	3	0
WC	(United States) Madison Keys	6	6

==== Ninth qualifier ====
First round
9	(Czech Republic) Lucie Hradecká	3	1
(Australia) Casey Dellacqua	6	6
(United States) Melanie Oudin	3	4
18	(Hungary) Melinda Czink	6	6

Qualifying competition
(Australia) Casey Dellacqua	6	7^{7}
18	(Hungary) Melinda Czink	4	6^{2}

==== Tenth qualifier ====
First round
10	(Serbia) Bojana Jovanovski	3	6	6^{2}
(Australia) Olivia Rogowska	6	2	7^{7}
(Australia) Jarmila Gajdošová	3	6^{4}
20	(Czech Republic) Andrea Hlaváčková	6	7^{7}

Qualifying competition
(Australia) Olivia Rogowska	7^{7}	4	4
20	(Czech Republic) Andrea Hlaváčková	6^{5}	6	6

==== Eleventh qualifier ====
First round
11	(United States) CoCo Vandeweghe	3	6^{2}
(Greece) Eleni Daniilidou	6	7^{7}
(Chinese Taipei) Chang Kai-chen	5	4
23	(Ukraine) Kateryna Bondarenko	7	6

Qualifying competition
(Greece) Eleni Daniilidou	6	7^{7}
23	(Ukraine) Kateryna Bondarenko	3	6^{2}

==== Twelfth qualifier ====
First round
12	(Spain) Lourdes Domínguez Lino	3	3
WC	(United States) Bethanie Mattek-Sands	6	6
(Chinese Taipei) Chan Yung-jan	6	4	6
13	(United Kingdom) Anne Keothavong	3	6	0

Qualifying competition
WC	(United States) Bethanie Mattek-Sands	1	7	6
(Chinese Taipei) Chan Yung-jan	6	5	3
