= Ekaterina Makarova career statistics =

Career finals
| Discipline | Type | Won | Lost | Total | WR (Note: Winning rate) |
| Singles | Grand Slam | – | – | – | – |
| Singles | Summer Olympics | – | – | – | – |
| Singles | WTA Finals (Note: Formerly known as: Virginia Slims Championships (until 1995); WTA Tour Championships (until 2014)) | – | – | – | – |
| Singles | WTA Elite (Note: Elite tier: WTA Tournament of Champions (2009–14); WTA Elite Trophy (2015–present)) | – | – | – | – |
| Singles | WTA 1000 (Note: Formerly known as: Category 4 & 5 & 6 (until 1990); Tier I (until 2009); WTA Premier Mandatory and 5 (until 2021)) | – | – | – | – |
| Singles | WTA 500 (Note: Formerly known as: Category 3 (until 1990); Tier II (until 2009); WTA Premier (until 2021)) | 1 | 0 | 1 | 1.00 |
| Singles | WTA 250 (Note: Formerly known as: Category 1 & 2 (until 1990); Tier III & IV & V (until 2009); WTA International (until 2021)) | 2 | 2 | 4 | 0.50 |
| Singles | Total | 3 | 2 | 5 | 0.60 |
| Doubles | Grand Slam | 3 | 4 | 7 | – |
| Doubles | Summer Olympics | 1 | 0 | 1 | 1.00 |
| Doubles | WTA Finals | 1 | 1 | 2 | 0.50 |
| Doubles | WTA Elite | – | – | – | – |
| Doubles | WTA 1000 | 7 | 11 | 18 | 0.39 |
| Doubles | WTA 500 | 2 | 2 | 4 | 0.50 |
| Doubles | WTA 250 | 1 | 3 | 4 | 0.25 |
| Doubles | Total | 15 | 21 | 36 | 0.42 |
| Mixed doubles | Grand Slam | 1 | 1 | 2 | 0.50 |
| Mixed doubles | Total | 1 | 1 | 2 | 0.50 |
| Total | | 19 | 24 | 43 | 0.44 |

This is a list of the main career statistics of former professional Russian tennis player Ekaterina Makarova.

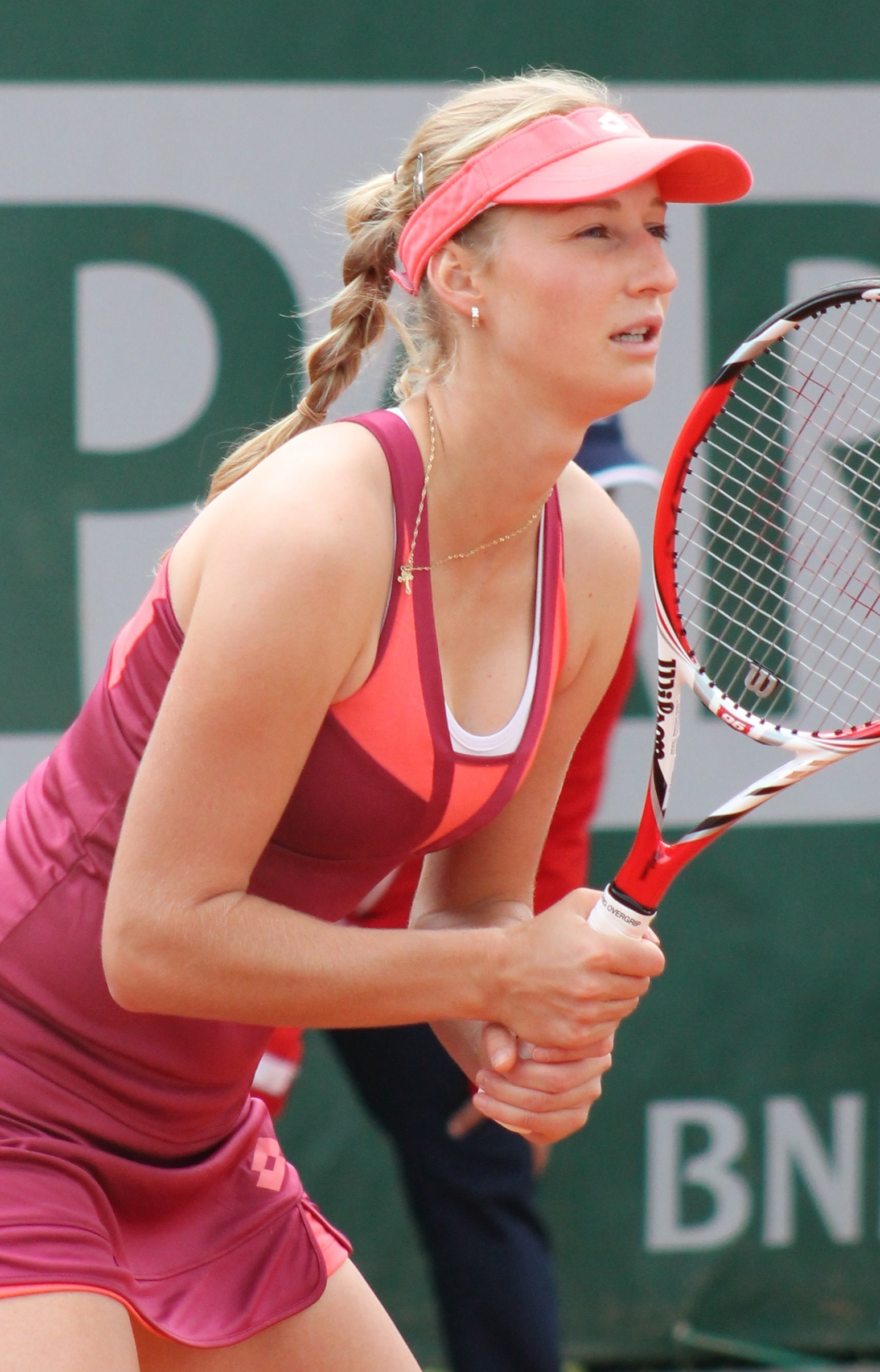
Makarova at the 2013 French Open.

== Performance timelines ==
Key
| W | F | SF | QF | #R | RR | Q# | P# | DNQ | A | Z# | PO | G | S | B | NMS | NTI | P | NH |

(W) winner; (F) finalist; (SF) semifinalist; (QF) quarterfinalist; (#R) rounds 4, 3, 2, 1; (RR) round-robin stage; (Q#) qualification round; (P#) preliminary round; (DNQ) did not qualify; (A) absent; (Z#) Davis/Fed Cup Zonal Group (with number indication) or (PO) play-off; (G) gold, (S) silver or (B) bronze Olympic/Paralympic medal; (NMS) not a Masters tournament; (NTI) not a Tier I tournament; (P) postponed; (NH) not held; (SR) strike rate (events won / competed); (W–L) win–loss record.

Only main-draw results in WTA Tour, Grand Slam tournaments, Billie Jean King Cup (Fed Cup), Hopman Cup and Olympic Games are included in win–loss records.

=== Singles ===
| Tournament | 2004 | 2005 | 2006 | 2007 | 2008 | 2009 | 2010 | 2011 | 2012 | 2013 | 2014 | 2015 | 2016 | 2017 | 2018 | 2019 | SR | W–L | Win % |
|---|---|---|---|---|---|---|---|---|---|---|---|---|---|---|---|---|---|---|---|
Grand Slam tournaments
| Australian Open | A | A | A | A | 3R | 2R | 2R | 4R | QF | QF | 4R | SF | 4R | 4R | 1R | 1R | 0 / 12 | 29–12 | 71% |
| French Open | A | A | A | Q2 | 2R | 1R | 1R | 4R | 1R | 1R | 3R | 4R | 2R | 2R | 2R | A | 0 / 11 | 12–11 | 52% |
| Wimbledon | A | A | A | Q3 | 1R | 2R | 2R | 1R | 2R | 3R | QF | 2R | 4R | 2R | 4R | A | 0 / 11 | 17–11 | 61% |
| US Open | A | Q2 | A | 3R | 3R | 1R | 1R | 1R | 3R | QF | SF | 4R | 1R | 3R | 3R | A | 0 / 12 | 22–12 | 65% |
| Win–loss | 0–0 | 0–0 | 0–0 | 2–1 | 5–4 | 2–4 | 2–4 | 6–4 | 7–4 | 10–4 | 14–4 | 12–4 | 7–4 | 7–4 | 6–4 | 0–1 | 0 / 46 | 80–46 | 63% |
National representation
| Summer Olympics | A | NH | | | A | NH | | | A | NH | | | 3R | NH | | | 0 / 1 | 2–1 | 67% |
Year-end championship
| WTA Elite Trophy | NH | | | | | DNQ | | | | | RR | DNQ | | | | | 0 / 1 | 0–2 | 0% |
WTA 1000 + former^{†} tournaments
| Dubai / Qatar Open (Note: The first Premier 5 event of the year has switched back and forth between the Dubai Tennis Championships and the Qatar Total Open since 2009. Dubai was classified as a Premier 5 event from 2009 to 2011 before being succeeded by Doha for the 2012–2014 period. In 2015, Dubai regained its Premier 5 status while Doha was demoted to Premier status. The Premier 5 tournaments were reclassified as WTA 1000 tournaments in 2021.) | NP5 | | | | 1R | 1R | 1R | 1R | A | 2R | A | QF | 1R | 3R | 2R | 1R | 0 / 10 | 6–10 | 38% |
| Indian Wells Open | A | A | A | A | 2R | 2R | 1R | 2R | 2R | 2R | 3R | 3R | 3R | 1R | 2R | A | 0 / 11 | 8–11 | 42% |
| Miami Open | A | A | A | A | 1R | 4R | 2R | 3R | 4R | 2R | 4R | 4R | QF | 2R | 2R | A | 0 / 11 | 17–11 | 61% |
| Berlin / Madrid Open (Note: In 2009, the Berlin Open was replaced by the Madrid Open. The Premier Mandatory tournaments were reclassified as WTA 1000 tournaments in 2021.) | A | A | A | A | Q2 | A | Q2 | 2R | 3R | QF | 1R | 1R | 2R | 1R | 1R | A | 0 / 8 | 7–8 | 47% |
| Italian Open | A | A | A | A | 2R | A | A | 2R | 2R | 1R | 2R | 2R | 2R | 3R | A | A | 0 / 8 | 8–8 | 50% |
| Canadian Open | A | A | A | A | A | 1R | 2R | 2R | 2R | 2R | SF | 2R | 1R | 3R | 1R | A | 0 / 10 | 11–10 | 52% |
| Cincinnati Open | NP5 | | | | | 1R | Q2 | 2R | 3R | 2R | 2R | A | A | 3R | 3R | A | 0 / 7 | 9–7 | 56% |
| Pan Pacific / Wuhan Open (Note: In 2014, the Toray Pan Pacific Open was downgraded to a Premier event and replaced by the Wuhan Open. The Premier 5 tournaments were reclassified as WTA 1000 tournaments in 2021.) | A | A | A | A | A | 1R | 1R | A | 1R | A | 2R | A | 2R | QF | Q1 | A | 0 / 6 | 5–6 | 45% |
| China Open | Tier II | | | | | 2R | 1R | 1R | 2R | A | 3R | A | 2R | 2R | 1R | A | 0 / 8 | 6–8 | 43% |
| Southern California Open^{†} | A | A | A | Q1 | NMS/NH | | | | | | | | | | | | 0 / 0 | 0–0 | – |
| Kremlin Cup^{†} | Q3 | Q2 | A | Q1 | 2R | NMS | | | | | | | | | | | 0 / 1 | 1–1 | 50% |
| Win–loss | 0–0 | 0–0 | 0–0 | 0–0 | 3–5 | 5–7 | 2–6 | 7–8 | 11–8 | 6–7 | 12–8 | 7–6 | 8–8 | 12–9 | 5–7 | 0–1 | 0 / 80 | 78–80 | 49% |
Career statistics
| | 2004 | 2005 | 2006 | 2007 | 2008 | 2009 | 2010 | 2011 | 2012 | 2013 | 2014 | 2015 | 2016 | 2017 | 2018 | 2019 | SR | W–L | Win % |
| Tournaments | | N/A | N/A | 2 | 20 | 22 | 21 | 23 | 19 | 18 | 20 | 13 | 20 | 22 | 17 | 3 | Career total: 220 | | |
| Titles | | 0 | 0 | 0 | 0 | 0 | 1 | 0 | 0 | 0 | 1 | 0 | 0 | 1 | 0 | | Career total: 3 | | |
| Finals | | 0 | 0 | 0 | 0 | 2 | 1 | 0 | 0 | 0 | 1 | 0 | 0 | 1 | 0 | | Career total: 5 | | |
| Hard win–loss | | 0–0 | 0–0 | 2–2 | 9–13 | 7–15 | 6–14 | 9–16 | 20–12 | 17–11 | 30–15 | 15–8 | 17–13 | 22–14 | 8–13 | 0–3 | 2 / 150 | 160–148 | 52% |
| Clay win–loss | | 0–0 | 0–0 | 0–0 | 4–4 | 9–4 | 1–4 | 5–4 | 3–4 | 3–4 | 3–4 | 3–3 | 4–5 | 5–5 | 1–3 | | 0 / 44 | 41–44 | 48% |
| Grass win–loss | | 0–0 | 0–0 | 0–0 | 4–3 | 3–3 | 7–2 | 1–3 | 7–3 | 4–3 | 6–2 | 1–2 | 6–2 | 1–2 | 3–3 | | 1 / 28 | 43–27 | 61% |
| Overall win–loss | | 0–0 | 0–0 | 2–2 | 17–20 | 19–22 | 14–20 | 15–23 | 26–19 | 24–18 | 39–21 | 19–13 | 27–19 | 28–21 | 12–19 | 0–3 | 3 / 220 | 240–218 | 52% |
| Year-end ranking | | 258 | 264 | 108 | 48 | 60 | 50 | 52 | 20 | 24 | 12 | 23 | 30 | 33 | 59 | | | | |

=== Doubles ===
| Tournament | 2007 | 2008 | 2009 | 2010 | 2011 | 2012 | 2013 | 2014 | 2015 | 2016 | 2017 | 2018 | 2019 | SR | W–L | Win % |
|---|---|---|---|---|---|---|---|---|---|---|---|---|---|---|---|---|
Grand Slam tournaments
| Australian Open | A | A | 2R | 2R | 1R | QF | SF | F | QF | A | QF | F | 2R | 0 / 10 | 26–10 | 72% |
| French Open | A | 2R | 2R | 2R | 1R | QF | W | 2R | SF | F | QF | 1R | A | 1 / 11 | 25–10 | 71% |
| Wimbledon | A | QF | QF | 2R | 3R | QF | 3R | 3R | F | QF | W | 2R | A | 1 / 11 | 31–10 | 76% |
| US Open | A | 2R | SF | 2R | 3R | 3R | QF | W | A | SF | 3R | QF | A | 1 / 10 | 28–9 | 76% |
| Win–loss | 0–0 | 5–3 | 9–4 | 4–4 | 3–4 | 11–4 | 15–3 | 14–3 | 12–3 | 12–3 | 14–3 | 9–4 | 1–1 | 3 / 42 | 110–39 | 74% |
National representation
| Summer Olympics | NH | A | NH | | | QF | NH | | | G | NH | | | 1 / 2 | 7–1 | 88% |
Year-end championship
| WTA Finals | DNQ | | | | | | F | QF | A | W | SF | A | DNQ | 1 / 4 | 5–3 | 63% |
WTA 1000
| Dubai / Qatar Open | NP5 | 2R | 1R | 1R | A | A | A | A | QF | 1R | W | QF | F | 1 / 8 | 10–7 | 59% |
| Indian Wells Open | A | A | 2R | 1R | 1R | 1R | W | QF | F | 1R | SF | F | A | 1 / 10 | 19–9 | 68% |
| Miami Open | A | A | 1R | QF | 1R | QF | QF | F | F | QF | QF | SF | A | 0 / 10 | 21–10 | 68% |
| Madrid Open | NH | | 2R | 1R | A | F | QF | 2R | QF | SF | 2R | W | A | 1 / 9 | 16–8 | 67% |
| Italian Open | A | A | A | A | A | F | A | QF | A | F | F | A | A | 0 / 4 | 13–4 | 76% |
| Canadian Open | A | A | QF | 1R | A | QF | SF | QF | 2R | W | W | F | A | 2 / 9 | 19–7 | 73% |
| Cincinnati Open | NP5 | | QF | 1R | SF | 2R | SF | 2R | A | A | A | W | A | 1 / 7 | 14–6 | 70% |
| Pan Pacific / Wuhan Open | A | A | 1R | A | A | A | A | A | A | A | QF | 2R | A | 0 / 3 | 2–3 | 40% |
| China Open | NPM | | F | 1R | 1R | W | A | A | A | 2R | SF | SF | A | 1 / 7 | 13–6 | 68% |
Career statistics
| Tournaments | 2 | 11 | 19 | 17 | 15 | 15 | 11 | 15 | 10 | 13 | 15 | 15 | 3 | Career total: 160 | | |
| Titles | 0 | 0 | 1 | 0 | 0 | 2 | 2 | 1 | 0 | 3 | 3 | 2 | 1 | Career total: 15 | | |
| Finals | 0 | 2 | 2 | 0 | 2 | 4 | 3 | 3 | 3 | 5 | 5 | 5 | 2 | Career total: 36 | | |
| Overall win–loss | 0–2 | 14–11 | 27–18 | 7–17 | 13–14 | 35–13 | 30–11 | 24–14 | 26–10 | 34–10 | 38–12 | 37–12 | 8–2 | 15 / 160 | 369–176 | 68% |
| Year-end ranking | 151 | 62 | 20 | 72 | 57 | 11 | 7 | 7 | 10 | 8 | 3 | 6 | | No. 1 | | |

== Significant finals ==
=== Grand Slams ===
==== Doubles: 7 (3 titles, 4 runner-ups) ====
| Result | Year | Championship | Surface | Partner | Opponents | Score |
|---|---|---|---|---|---|---|
| Win | 2013 | French Open | Clay | (Russia) Elena Vesnina | (Italy) Sara Errani (Italy) Roberta Vinci | 7–5, 6–2 |
| Loss | 2014 | Australian Open | Hard | (Russia) Elena Vesnina | (Italy) Sara Errani (Italy) Roberta Vinci | 4–6, 6–3, 5–7 |
| Win | 2014 | US Open | Hard | (Russia) Elena Vesnina | (Switzerland) Martina Hingis (Italy) Flavia Pennetta | 2–6, 6–3, 6–2 |
| Loss | 2015 | Wimbledon | Grass | (Russia) Elena Vesnina | (Switzerland) Martina Hingis (India) Sania Mirza | 7–5, 6–7^{(4–7)}, 5–7 |
| Loss | 2016 | French Open | Clay | (Russia) Elena Vesnina | (France) Caroline Garcia (France) Kristina Mladenovic | 3–6, 6–2, 4–6 |
| Win | 2017 | Wimbledon | Grass | (Russia) Elena Vesnina | (Chinese Taipei) Chan Hao-ching (Romania) Monica Niculescu | 6–0, 6–0 |
| Loss | 2018 | Australian Open | Hard | (Russia) Elena Vesnina | (Hungary) Tímea Babos (France) Kristina Mladenovic | 4–6, 3–6 |

==== Mixed doubles: 2 (1 title, 1 runner-up) ====
| Result | Year | Championship | Surface | Partner | Opponents | Score |
|---|---|---|---|---|---|---|
| Loss | 2010 | Australian Open | Hard | (Czech Republic) Jaroslav Levinský | (Zimbabwe) Cara Black (India) Leander Paes | 5–7, 3–6 |
| Win | 2012 | US Open | Hard | (Brazil) Bruno Soares | (Czech Republic) Květa Peschke (Poland) Marcin Matkowski | 6–7^{(8–10)}, 6–1, [12–10] |

=== Olympics ===
==== Doubles: 1 (1–0) ====
| Result | Year | Tournament | Surface | Partner | Opponents | Score |
|---|---|---|---|---|---|---|
| Gold | 2016 | Rio Olympics | Hard | (Russia) Elena Vesnina | (Switzerland) Timea Bacsinszky; (Switzerland) Martina Hingis | 6–4, 6–4 |

=== WTA Finals ===
==== Doubles: 2 (1 title, 1 runner-up) ====
| Result | Year | Tournament | Surface | Partner | Opponents | Score |
|---|---|---|---|---|---|---|
| Loss | 2013 | WTA Championships, Istanbul | Hard (i) | (Russia) Elena Vesnina | (Chinese Taipei) Hsieh Su-wei (China) Peng Shuai | 4–6, 5–7 |
| Win | 2016 | WTA Finals, Singapore | Hard (i) | (Russia) Elena Vesnina | (United States) Bethanie Mattek-Sands (Czech Republic) Lucie Šafářová | 7–6^{(7–5)}, 6–3 |

=== WTA 1000 ===
==== Doubles: 18 (7 titles, 11 runner-ups) ====
| Result | Year | Tournament | Surface | Partner | Opponents | Score |
|---|---|---|---|---|---|---|
| Loss | 2009 | China Open | Hard | (Russia) Alla Kudryavtseva | (Chinese Taipei) Hsieh Su-wei; (China) Peng Shuai | 3–6, 1–6 |
| Loss | 2012 | Madrid Open | Clay | (Russia) Elena Vesnina | (Italy) Sara Errani; (Italy) Roberta Vinci | 1–6, 6–3, [4–10] |
| Loss | 2012 | Italian Open | Clay | (Russia) Elena Vesnina | (Italy) Sara Errani (Italy) Roberta Vinci | 2–6, 5–7 |
| Win | 2012 | China Open | Hard | (Russia) Elena Vesnina | (Spain) Nuria Llagostera Vives; (India) Sania Mirza | 7–5, 7–5 |
| Win | 2013 | Indian Wells Open | Hard | (Russia) Elena Vesnina | (Russia) Nadia Petrova; (Slovenia) Katarina Srebotnik | 6–0, 5–7, [10–6] |
| Loss | 2014 | Miami Open | Hard | (Russia) Elena Vesnina | (Switzerland) Martina Hingis; (Germany) Sabine Lisicki | 6–4, 4–6, [5–10] |
| Loss | 2015 | Indian Wells Open | Hard | (Russia) Elena Vesnina | (Switzerland) Martina Hingis (India) Sania Mirza | 3–6, 4–6 |
| Loss | 2015 | Miami Open | Hard | (Russia) Elena Vesnina | (Switzerland) Martina Hingis (India) Sania Mirza | 5–7, 1–6 |
| Loss | 2016 | Italian Open | Clay | (Russia) Elena Vesnina | (Switzerland) Martina Hingis (India) Sania Mirza | 1–6, 7–6^{(7–5)}, [3–10] |
| Win | 2016 | Canadian Open | Hard | (Russia) Elena Vesnina | (Romania) Simona Halep; (Romania) Monica Niculescu | 6–3, 7–6^{(7–5)} |
| Win | 2017 | Dubai Championships | Hard | (Russia) Elena Vesnina | (Czech Republic) Andrea Hlaváčková (China) Peng Shuai | 6–2, 4–6, [10–7] |
| Loss | 2017 | Italian Open | Clay | (Russia) Elena Vesnina | (Chinese Taipei) Chan Yung-jan (Switzerland) Martina Hingis | 5–7, 6–7^{(4–7)} |
| Win | 2017 | Canadian Open (2) | Hard | (Russia) Elena Vesnina | (Germany) Anna-Lena Grönefeld; (Czech Republic) Květa Peschke | 6–0, 6–4 |
| Loss | 2018 | Indian Wells Open | Hard | (Russia) Elena Vesnina | (Chinese Taipei) Hsieh Su-wei; (Czech Republic) Barbora Strýcová | 4–6, 4–6 |
| Win | 2018 | Madrid Open | Clay | (Russia) Elena Vesnina | (Hungary) Tímea Babos; (France) Kristina Mladenovic | 2–6, 6–4, [10–8] |
| Loss | 2018 | Canadian Open | Hard | (Chinese Taipei) Latisha Chan | (Australia) Ashleigh Barty; (Netherlands) Demi Schuurs | 6–4, 3–6, [8–10] |
| Win | 2018 | Cincinnati Open | Hard | (Czech Republic) Lucie Hradecká | (Belgium) Elise Mertens (Netherlands) Demi Schuurs | 6–2, 7–5 |
| Loss | 2019 | Dubai Championships | Hard | (Czech Republic) Lucie Hradecká | (Chinese Taipei) Hsieh Su-wei (Czech Republic) Barbora Strýcová | 4–6, 4–6 |

== WTA Tour finals ==
=== Singles: 5 (3 titles, 2 runner-ups) ===
| Legend WTA 500 (Premier) (1–0) WTA 250 (International) (2–2) | Finals by surface Hard (2–0) Grass (1–0) Clay (0–2) |

| Result | W–L | Date | Tournament | Tier | Surface | Opponent | Score |
|---|---|---|---|---|---|---|---|
| Loss | 0–1 | May 2009 | Morocco Open, Fes | International | Clay | (Spain) Anabel Medina Garrigues | 0–6, 1–6 |
| Loss | 0–2 | May 2009 | Portugal Open, Estoril | International | Clay | (Belgium) Yanina Wickmayer | 5–7, 2–6 |
| Win | 1–2 | Jun 2010 | Eastbourne International, UK | Premier | Grass | (Belarus) Victoria Azarenka | 7–6^{(7–5)}, 6–4 |
| Win | 2–2 | Feb 2014 | Thailand Open, Pattaya City | International | Hard | (Czech Republic) Karolína Plíšková | 6–3, 7–6^{(9–7)} |
| Win | 3–2 | Aug 2017 | Washington Open, USA | International | Hard | (Germany) Julia Görges | 3–6, 7–6^{(7–2)}, 6–0 |

=== Doubles: 36 (15 titles, 21 runner-ups) ===
| Legend Grand Slam tournaments (3–4) Olympics (1–0) Finals (1–1) WTA 1000 (Premier 5 / Premier M) (7–11) WTA 500 (Premier) (2–2) WTA 250 (Tier IV / International) (1–3) | Finals by surface Hard (11–14) Grass (1–1) Clay (3–6) |

| Result | W–L | Date | Tournament | Tier | Surface | Partner | Opponenta | Score |
|---|---|---|---|---|---|---|---|---|
| Loss | 0–1 | May 2008 | Morocco Open, Morocco | Tier IV | Clay | (Russia) Alisa Kleybanova | (Romania) Sorana Cîrstea; (Russia) Maria Kirilenko | 2–6, 2–6 |
| Loss | 0–2 | Jul 2008 | Slovenia Open, Slovenia | Tier IV | Hard | (Russia) Vera Dushevina | (Spain) Anabel Medina Garrigues; (Spain) Virginia Ruano Pascual | 4–6, 1–6 |
| Win | 1–2 | May 2009 | Morocco Open, Morocco | International | Clay | (Russia) Alisa Kleybanova | (Romania) Sorana Cîrstea (Russia) Anastasia Pavlyuchenkova | 6–3, 2–6, [10–8] |
| Loss | 1–3 | Oct 2009 | China Open, China | Premier M | Hard | (Russia) Alla Kudryavtseva | (Chinese Taipei) Hsieh Su-wei; (China) Peng Shuai | 3–6, 1–6 |
| Loss | 1–4 | Feb 2011 | Open GDF Suez, France | Premier | Hard (i) | (Russia) Vera Dushevina | (United States) Bethanie Mattek-Sands; (United States) Meghann Shaughnessy | 4–6, 2–6 |
| Loss | 1–5 | Oct 2011 | Luxembourg Open | International | Hard (i) | (Czech Republic) Lucie Hradecká | (Czech Republic) Iveta Benešová; (Czech Republic) Barbora Záhlavová-Strýcová | 5–7, 3–6 |
| Loss | 1–6 | May 2012 | Madrid Open, Spain | Premier M | Clay (blue) | (Russia) Elena Vesnina | (Italy) Sara Errani; (Italy) Roberta Vinci | 1–6, 6–3, [4–10] |
| Loss | 1–7 | May 2012 | Italian Open, Italy | Premier 5 | Clay | (Russia) Elena Vesnina | (Italy) Sara Errani (Italy) Roberta Vinci | 2–6, 5–7 |
| Win | 2–7 | Oct 2012 | China Open, China | Premier M | Hard | (Russia) Elena Vesnina | (Spain) Nuria Llagostera Vives; (India) Sania Mirza | 7–5, 7–5 |
| Win | 3–7 | Oct 2012 | Kremlin Cup, Russia | Premier | Hard (i) | (Russia) Elena Vesnina | (Russia) Maria Kirilenko; (Russia) Nadia Petrova | 6–3, 1–6, [10–8] |
| Win | 4–7 | Mar 2013 | Indian Wells Open, U.S. | Premier M | Hard | (Russia) Elena Vesnina | (Russia) Nadia Petrova (Slovenia) Katarina Srebotnik | 6–0, 5–7, [10–6] |
| Win | 5–7 | May 2013 | French Open, France | Grand Slam | Clay | (Russia) Elena Vesnina | (Italy) Sara Errani (Italy) Roberta Vinci | 7–5, 6–2 |
| Loss | 5–8 | Oct 2013 | WTA Finals, Istanbul | Finals | Hard (i) | (Russia) Elena Vesnina | (Chinese Taipei) Hsieh Su-wei (China) Peng Shuai | 4–6, 5–7 |
| Loss | 5–9 | Jan 2014 | Australian Open, Australia | Grand Slam | Hard | (Russia) Elena Vesnina | (Italy) Sara Errani (Italy) Roberta Vinci | 4–6, 6–3, 5–7 |
| Loss | 5–10 | Mar 2014 | Miami Open, U.S. | Premier M | Hard | (Russia) Elena Vesnina | (Switzerland) Martina Hingis; (Germany) Sabine Lisicki | 6–4, 4–6, [5–10] |
| Win | 6–10 | Sep 2014 | US Open, United States | Grand Slam | Hard | (Russia) Elena Vesnina | (Switzerland) Martina Hingis (Italy) Flavia Pennetta | 2–6, 6–3, 6–2 |
| Loss | 6–11 | Mar 2015 | Indian Wells Open, U.S. | Premier M | Hard | (Russia) Elena Vesnina | (Switzerland) Martina Hingis (India) Sania Mirza | 3–6, 4–6 |
| Loss | 6–12 | Apr 2015 | Miami Open, U.S. | Premier M | Hard | (Russia) Elena Vesnina | (Switzerland) Martina Hingis (India) Sania Mirza | 5–7, 1–6 |
| Loss | 6–13 | Jul 2015 | Wimbledon, UK | Grand Slam | Grass | (Russia) Elena Vesnina | (Switzerland) Martina Hingis (India) Sania Mirza | 7–5, 6–7^{(4–7)}, 5–7 |
| Loss | 6–14 | May 2016 | Italian Open, Italy | Premier 5 | Clay | (Russia) Elena Vesnina | (Switzerland) Martina Hingis (India) Sania Mirza | 1–6, 7–6^{(7–5)}, [3–10] |
| Loss | 6–15 | Jun 2016 | French Open, France | Grand Slam | Clay | (Russia) Elena Vesnina | (France) Caroline Garcia (France) Kristina Mladenovic | 3–6, 6–2, 4–6 |
| Win | 7–15 | Jul 2016 | Canadian Open, Canada | Premier 5 | Hard | (Russia) Elena Vesnina | (Romania) Simona Halep (Romania) Monica Niculescu | 6–3, 7–6^{(7–5)} |
| Win | 8–15 | Aug 2016 | Summer Olympics, Brazil | Olympics | Hard | (Russia) Elena Vesnina | (Switzerland) Timea Bacsinszky (Switzerland) Martina Hingis | 6–4, 6–4 |
| Win | 9–15 | Oct 2016 | WTA Finals, Singapore | Finals | Hard (i) | (Russia) Elena Vesnina | (United States) Bethanie Mattek-Sands; (Czech Republic) Lucie Šafářová | 7–6^{(7–5)}, 6–3 |
| Loss | 9–16 | Jan 2017 | Brisbane International, Australia | Premier | Hard | (Russia) Elena Vesnina | (United States) Bethanie Mattek-Sands (India) Sania Mirza | 2–6, 3–6 |
| Win | 10–16 | Feb 2017 | Dubai Championships, UAE | Premier 5 | Hard | (Russia) Elena Vesnina | (Czech Republic) Andrea Hlaváčková (China) Peng Shuai | 6–2, 4–6, [10–7] |
| Loss | 10–17 | May 2017 | Italian Open, Italy | Premier 5 | Clay | (Russia) Elena Vesnina | (Chinese Taipei) Chan Yung-jan (Switzerland) Martina Hingis | 5–7, 6–7^{(4–7)} |
| Win | 11–17 | Jul 2017 | Wimbledon, UK | Grand Slam | Grass | (Russia) Elena Vesnina | (Chinese Taipei) Chan Hao-ching (Romania) Monica Niculescu | 6–0, 6–0 |
| Win | 12–17 | Aug 2017 | Canadian Open, Canada (2) | Premier 5 | Hard | (Russia) Elena Vesnina | (Germany) Anna-Lena Grönefeld; (Czech Republic) Květa Peschke | 6–0, 6–4 |
| Loss | 12–18 | Jan 2018 | Australian Open | Grand Slam | Hard | (Russia) Elena Vesnina | (Hungary) Tímea Babos (France) Kristina Mladenovic | 4–6, 3–6 |
| Loss | 12–19 | Mar 2018 | Indian Wells Open, U.S. | Premier M | Hard | (Russia) Elena Vesnina | (Chinese Taipei) Hsieh Su-wei (Czech Republic) Barbora Strýcová | 4–6, 4–6 |
| Win | 13–19 | May 2018 | Madrid Open, Spain | Premier M | Clay | (Russia) Elena Vesnina | (Hungary) Tímea Babos (France) Kristina Mladenovic | 2–6, 6–4, [10–8] |
| Loss | 13–20 | Aug 2018 | Rogers Cup, Canada | Premier 5 | Hard | (Chinese Taipei) Latisha Chan | (Australia) Ashleigh Barty; (Netherlands) Demi Schuurs | 6–4, 3–6, [8–10] |
| Win | 14–20 | Aug 2018 | Cincinnati Open, U.S. | Premier 5 | Hard | (Czech Republic) Lucie Hradecká | (Belgium) Elise Mertens (Netherlands) Demi Schuurs | 6–2, 7–5 |
| Win | 15–20 | Feb 2019 | St. Petersburg Trophy, Russia | Premier | Hard (i) | (Russia) Margarita Gasparyan | (Russia) Anna Kalinskaya (Slovakia) Viktória Kužmová | 7–5, 7–5 |
| Loss | 15–21 | Feb 2019 | Dubai Championships, UAE | Premier 5 | Hard | (Czech Republic) Lucie Hradecká | (Chinese Taipei) Hsieh Su-wei (Czech Republic) Barbora Strýcová | 4–6, 4–6 |

== ITF Circuit finals ==
=== Singles: 6 (3 titles, 3 runner–ups) ===
Legend
$25,000 tournaments (1–3)
$10,000 tournaments (2–0)

| Result | W–L | Date | Tournament | Tier | Surface | Opponents | Score |
|---|---|---|---|---|---|---|---|
| Win | 1–0 | May 2004 | ITF Antalya, Turkey | 10,000 | Clay | (Ukraine) Kateryna Herth | 6–3, 6–3 |
| Win | 2–0 | Aug 2004 | ITF Târgu Mureș, Romania | 10,000 | Clay | (Romania) Simona Matei | 6–1, 6–1 |
| Loss | 2–1 | May 2006 | ITF Torrent, Spain | 25,000 | Clay | (Switzerland) Romina Oprandi | 1–6, 3–6 |
| Loss | 2–2 | Aug 2006 | ITF Moscow, Russia | 25,000 | Clay | (Russia) Evgeniya Rodina | 6–7^{(4)}, 3–6 |
| Win | 3–2 | Apr 2007 | ITF Moscow, Russia | 25,000 | Clay | (Russia) Evgeniya Rodina | 6–4, 6–7^{(6)}, 6–3 |
| Loss | 3–3 | Jun 2007 | ITF Moscow, Russia | 25,000 | Clay | (Russia) Anastasia Pivovarova | 3–6, 5–7 |

=== Doubles: 15 (9 titles, 6 runner–ups) ===
Legend
$75,000 tournaments (0–1)
$50,000 tournaments (2–2)
$25,000 tournaments (7–3)

| Result | W–L | Date | Tournament | Tier | Surface | Partner | Opponents | Score |
|---|---|---|---|---|---|---|---|---|
| Win | 1–0 | Aug 2004 | ITF Moscow, Russia | 25,000 | Clay | (Russia) Ekaterina Kosminskaya | (Czech Republic) Renata Kucerkova (Slovakia) Michaela Michalkova | 3–6, 6–3, 6–4 |
| Loss | 1–1 | Feb 2005 | ITF Redbridge, UK | 25,000 | Hard (i) | (Belarus) Darya Kustova | (Italy) Giulia Casoni (Italy) Francesca Lubiani | 4–6, 3–6 |
| Win | 2–1 | Mar 2005 | ITF St. Petersburg, Russia | 25,000 | Hard (i) | (Russia) Nina Bratchikova | (Russia) Ekaterina Kosminskaya (Russia) Alla Kudryavtseva | 7–6^{(2)}, 6–2 |
| Loss | 2–2 | Aug 2005 | ITF Rimini, Italy | 50,000 | Clay | (Belarus) Darya Kustova | (Italy) Giulia Casoni (Ukraine) Mariya Koryttseva | 2–6, 4–6 |
| Loss | 2–3 | Dec 2005 | ITF Dubai, UAE | 75,000 | Hard | (Russia) Olga Panova | (Czech Republic) Gabriela Chmelinová (Czech Republic) Hana Šromová | 5–7, 4–6 |
| Win | 3–3 | Feb 2006 | ITF Capriolo, Italy | 25,000 | Carpet (i) | (Russia) Darya Kustova | (Georgia (country)) Margalita Chakhnashvili (Russia) Ekaterina Lopes | 6–2, 6–4 |
| Win | 4–3 | May 2006 | ITF Torrent, Spain | 25,000 | Clay | (Spain) Gabriela Velasco Andreu | (Spain) Sílvia Soler Espinosa (Spain) Carla Suárez Navarro | 6–4, 6–2 |
| Loss | 4–4 | Jul 2006 | ITF Vittel, France | 50,000 | Clay | (Romania) Mădălina Gojnea | (Ukraine) Yuliya Beygelzimer (Hungary) Ágnes Szávay | 2–6, 5–7 |
| Win | 5–4 | Aug 2006 | ITF Moscow, Russia | 25,000 | Clay | (Russia) Maria Kondratieva | (Romania) Mihaela Buzărnescu (Russia) Evgeniya Rodina | 4–6, 6–4, 6–1 |
| Win | 6–4 | Nov 2006 | ITF Minsk, Belarus | 25,000 | Carpet (i) | (Belarus) Darya Kustova | (Belarus) Ekaterina Dzehalevich (Russia) Evgeniya Rodina | 6–4, 6–4 |
| Loss | 6–5 | Mar 2007 | ITF Minsk, Belarus | 25,000 | Carpet (i) | (Russia) Evgeniya Rodina | (France) Iryna Brémond (Belarus) Darya Kustova | 6–4, 4–6, 4–6 |
| Loss | 6–6 | Apr 2007 | ITF Civitavecchia, Italy | 25,000 | Clay | (Belarus) Darya Kustova | (Belarus) Ekaterina Dzehalevich (Ukraine) Mariya Koryttseva | 6–7^{(6)}, 7–5, 1–6 |
| Win | 7–6 | Jun 2007 | ITF Moscow, Russia | 25,000 | Clay | (Russia) Alisa Kleybanova | (Russia) Ekaterina Afinogenova (Ukraine) Oksana Uzhylovska | 6–3, 6–7^{(4)}, 6–3 |
| Win | 8–6 | Jul 2007 | ITF Cuneo, Italy | 50,000 | Clay | (Belarus) Darya Kustova | (Ukraine) Yuliya Beygelzimer (Georgia (country)) Margalita Chakhnashvili | 6–2, 2–6, 6–2 |
| Win | 9–6 | Oct 2007 | ITF Saint-Raphaël, France | 50,000 | Hard (i) | (United States) Lilia Osterloh | (Georgia (country)) Margalita Chakhnashvili (Belarus) Ksenia Milevskaya | 6–2, 6–2 |

== WTA Tour career earnings ==
| Year | Grand Slam titles | WTA titles | Total titles | Earnings ($) | Money list rank |
| 2008 | 0 | 0 | 0 | 290,524 | 55 |
| 2009 | 0 | 1 | 1 | 465,292 | 48 |
| 2010 | 0 | 1 | 1 | 406,351 | 50 |
| 2011 | 0 | 2 | 2 | 450,008 | 49 |
| 2012 | 1 | 2 | 3 | 1,064,277 | 15 |
| 2013 | 1 | 1 | 2 | 1,573,745 | 14 |
| 2014 | 1 | 1 | 2 | 2,345,310 | 11 |
| 2015 | 0 | 0 | 0 | 1,705,438 | 16 |
| 2016 | 0 | 0 | 0 | 1,513,680 | 22 |
| 2017 | 1 | 3 | 4 | 1,562,698 | 22 |
| 2018 | 0 | 2 | 2 | 1,562,855 | 27 |
| 2019 | 0 | 1 | 1 | 145,080 | 193 |
| Career | 4 | 14 | 18 | 13,229,362 | 35 |

== Billie Jean King Cup ==
=== Participations ===
This table is current through the 2017 Fed Cup

Legend
WG F (Team won)
WG SF
WG QF
PO / WG2 / PO2

==== Singles: 10 (6–4) ====
| Edition | Round | Date | Location | Against | Surface | Opponent | W/L | Result |
|---|---|---|---|---|---|---|---|---|
| 2010 | WG SF | 24–25 Apr 2010 | Birmingham, Alabama, United States | United States | Hard (i) | Bethanie Mattek-Sands | L | 4–6, 6–2, 3–6 |
| 2013 | WG QF | 9 Feb 2013 | Moscow, Russia | Japan | Hard (i) | Ayumi Morita | L | 2–6, 2–6 |
| 2013 | WG QF | 9 Feb 2013 | Moscow, Russia | Japan | Hard (i) | Kimiko Date-Krumm | W | 6–1, 6–1 |
| 2013 | WG SF | 21 Apr 2013 | Moscow, Russia | Slovakia | Clay (i) | Daniela Hantuchová | W | 6–3, 4–6, 6–4 |
| 2014 | PO | 19 Apr 2014 | Sochi, Russia | Argentina | Clay (i) | María Irigoyen | W | 7–5, 6–1 |
| 2014 | PO | 19 Apr 2014 | Sochi, Russia | Argentina | Clay (i) | Paula Ormaechea | W | 6–1, 6–2 |
| 2016 | WG QF | 6 Feb 2016 | Moscow, Russia | Netherlands | Hard (i) | Kiki Bertens | L | 3–6, 4–6 |
| 2017 | WG2 | 11 Feb 2017 | Moscow, Russia | Chinese Taipei | Hard (i) | Lee Ya-hsuan | W | 6–3, 5–7, 6–1 |
| 2017 | WG2 | 11 Feb 2017 | Moscow, Russia | Chinese Taipei | Hard (i) | Chang Kai-chen | W | 6–4, 7–5 |
| 2018 | PO2 | 21 Apr 2018 | Khanty-Mansiysk, Russia | Latvia | Clay (i) | Jeļena Ostapenko | L | 5–7, 4–6 |

==== Doubles: 5 (5–0) ====
| Edition | Round | Date | Location | Against | Surface | Partner | Opponents | W/L | Result |
|---|---|---|---|---|---|---|---|---|---|
| 2008 | WG F | 14 Sep 2008 | Madrid, Spain | Spain | Clay | Elena Vesnina | Nuria Llagostera Vives; Carla Suárez Navarro | W | 6–2, 6–1 |
| 2011 | WG SF | 16 Apr 2011 | Moscow, Russia | Italy | Hard (i) | Anastasia Pavlyuchenkova | Alberta Brianti; Maria Elena Camerin | W | 7–6^{(7–3)}, 6–1 |
| 2013 | WG QF | 10 Feb 2013 | Moscow, Russia | Japan | Hard (i) | Elena Vesnina | Misaki Doi; Ayumi Morita | W | 6–2, 6–2 |
| 2013 | WG SF | 21 Apr 2013 | Moscow, Russia | Slovakia | Clay (i) | Elena Vesnina | Dominika Cibulková; Daniela Hantuchová | W | 4–6, 6–3, 6–1 |
| 2016 | WG QF | 7 Feb 2016 | Moscow, Russia | Netherlands | Hard (i) | Daria Kasatkina | Cindy Burger; Arantxa Rus | W | 6–0, 6–2 |

== Record against other players ==
=== Top 10 wins ===
==== Singles ====
| # | Player | vsRank | Event | Surface | Round | Score |
|---|---|---|---|---|---|---|
**2008**
| 1. | (Russia) Anna Chakvetadze | 10 | US Open | Hard | 1R | 1–6, 6–2, 6–3 |
**2009**
| 2. | (Russia) Nadia Petrova | 9 | Miami Open, U.S. | Hard | 3R | 7–5, 6–1 |
**2010**
| 3. | (Australia) Samantha Stosur | 7 | Eastbourne International, UK | Grass | SF | 7–6^{(7–5)}, 7–5 |
**2012**
| 4. | (Russia) Vera Zvonareva | 7 | Australian Open | Hard | 3R | 7–6^{(9–7)}, 6–1 |
| 5. | (Czech Republic) Petra Kvitová | 4 | Eastbourne International, UK | Grass | 1R | 7–5, 6–4 |
**2013**
| 6. | (Germany) Angelique Kerber | 5 | Australian Open | Hard | 4R | 7–5, 6–4 |
| 7. | (Belarus) Victoria Azarenka | 3 | Madrid Open, Spain | Clay | 2R | 1–6, 6–2, 6–3 |
| 8. | (Germany) Angelique Kerber | 7 | Eastbourne International, UK | Grass | 2R | 6–3, 6–4 |
| 9. | (Italy) Sara Errani | 5 | Connecticut Open, United States | Hard | 2R | 7–5, 6–1 |
| 10. | (Poland) Agnieszka Radwańska | 4 | US Open | Hard | 4R | 6–4, 6–4 |
**2014**
| 11. | (Serbia) Jelena Janković | 8 | Sydney International, Australia | Hard | 1R | 6–4, 6–2 |
| 12. | (Italy) Sara Errani | 10 | Miami Open, U.S. | Hard | 3R | 6–3, 2–6, 6–4 |
| 13. | (Poland) Agnieszka Radwańska | 4 | Wimbledon, UK | Grass | 4R | 6–3, 6–0 |
| 14. | (Czech Republic) Petra Kvitová | 4 | Rogers Cup, Canada | Hard | 3R | 6–4, 1–6, 6–2 |
| 15. | (Canada) Eugenie Bouchard | 7 | US Open | Hard | 4R | 7–6^{(7–2)}, 6–4 |
**2015**
| 16. | (Romania) Simona Halep | 3 | Australian Open | Hard | QF | 6–4, 6–0 |
**2016**
| 17. | (Czech Republic) Petra Kvitová | 7 | Miami Open, United States | Hard | 3R | 6–4, 6–4 |
| 18. | (Italy) Roberta Vinci | 7 | Eastbourne International, UK | Grass | 2R | 4–6, 6–4, 6–3 |
| 19. | (Czech Republic) Petra Kvitová | 10 | Wimbledon, UK | Grass | 2R | 7–5, 7–6^{(7–5)} |
**2017**
| 20. | (Slovakia) Dominika Cibulková | 6 | Australian Open | Hard | 3R | 6–2, 6–7^{(3–7)}, 6–3 |
| 21. | (Slovakia) Dominika Cibulková | 5 | Dubai Championships, UAE | Hard | 2R | 6–2, 4–6, 6–2 |
| 22. | (Poland) Agnieszka Radwańska | 8 | Stuttgart Open, Germany | Clay (i) | 1R | 6–2, 6–4 |
| 23. | (Slovakia) Dominika Cibulková | 5 | Italian Open | Clay | 2R | 1–6, 6–1, 6–3 |
| 24. | (Germany) Angelique Kerber | 1 | French Open | Clay | 1R | 6–2, 6–2 |
| 25. | (Romania) Simona Halep | 2 | Citi Open, United States | Hard | QF | 2–6, 6–3, 1–0 ret. |
| 26. | (United Kingdom) Johanna Konta | 7 | Rogers Cup, Canada | Hard | 2R | 5–7, 7–6^{(7–4)}, 6–3 |
| 27. | (Germany) Angelique Kerber | 3 | Cincinnati Open, U.S. | Hard | 2R | 6–4, 1–6, 7–6^{(13–11)} |
| 28. | (Denmark) Caroline Wozniacki | 5 | US Open | Hard | 2R | 6–2, 6–7^{(5–7)}, 6–1 |
**2018**
| 29. | (Latvia) Jeļena Ostapenko | 7 | Sydney International, Australia | Hard | 1R | 7–6^{(7–3)}, 6–1 |
| 30. | (Denmark) Caroline Wozniacki | 2 | Wimbledon, UK | Grass | 2R | 6–4, 1–6, 7–5 |
| 31. | (Czech Republic) Karolína Plíšková | 8 | Connecticut Open, United States | Hard | 1R | 6–1, 6–3 |
| 32. | (Germany) Julia Görges | 9 | US Open | Hard | 2R | 7–6^{(12–10)}, 6–3 |

==== Doubles ====
Players that were in the top 10 in that moment are in boldface.

| # | Partner | Opponents | vsRank | Event | Surface | Round | Score |
|---|---|---|---|---|---|---|---|
2009
| 1. | (Russia) Alisa Kleybanova | (Slovakia) Daniela Hantuchová (Japan) **Ai Sugiyama** | 22; 5 | Wimbledon, UK | Grass | 2R | 4–6, 7–6^{(7–5)}, 6–2 |
| 2. | (Russia) Alisa Kleybanova | (Italy) Flavia Pennetta (United States) **Lisa Raymond** | 24; 7 | Cincinnati Open, United States | Hard | 2R | 4–6, 6–3, [10–2] |
| 3. | (Russia) Alisa Kleybanova | **(Spain) Anabel Medina Garrigues** **(Spain) Virginia Ruano Pascual** | 3; 5 | US Open | Hard | 3R | 7–6^{(7–3)}, 6–3 |
| 4. | (Russia) Alla Kudryavtseva | (Spain) **Nuria Llagostera Vives** (Spain) María José Martínez Sánchez | 10; 11 | China Open | Hard | QF | 2–6, 7–6^{(8–6)}, [10–7] |
2011
| 5. | (China) Zheng Jie | **(Argentina) Gisela Dulko** **(Italy) Flavia Pennetta** | 4; 3 | Cincinnati Open, United States | Hard | QF | 6–4, 5–7, [10–7] |
2012
| 6. | (Russia) Alla Kudryavtseva | **(Czech Republic) Květa Peschke** **(Slovenia) Katarina Srebotnik** | 2; 2 | Australian Open | Hard | 2R | 3–2 ret. |
| 7. | (Russia) Elena Vesnina | **(Czech Republic) Andrea Hlaváčková** **(Czech Republic) Lucie Hradecká** | 7; 8 | Madrid Open, Spain | Clay | 2R | 6–3, 6–2 |
| 8. | (Ukraine) Olga Savchuk | **(Italy) Sara Errani** **(Italy) Roberta Vinci** | 3; 4 | Rogers Cup, Canada | Hard | 2R | 6–3, 2–6, [10–5] |
| 9. | (Russia) Elena Vesnina | **(Russia) Maria Kirilenko** **(Russia) Nadia Petrova** | 7; 10 | China Open | Hard | SF | 6–4, 7–5 |
| 10. | (Russia) Elena Vesnina | **(Russia) Maria Kirilenko** **(Russia) Nadia Petrova** | 8; 10 | Kremlin Cup, Russia | Hard | F | 6–3, 1–6, [10–8] |
2013
| 11. | (Russia) Elena Vesnina | (Russia) **Nadia Petrova** (Slovenia) Katarina Srebotnik | 3; 12 | Indian Wells Open, United States | Hard | F | 6–0, 5–7, [10–6] |
| 12. | (Russia) Elena Vesnina | **(Czech Republic) Andrea Hlaváčková** **(Czech Republic) Lucie Hradecká** | 4; 5 | French Open | Clay | SF | 6–4, 7–5 |
| 13. | (Russia) Elena Vesnina | **(Italy) Sara Errani** **(Italy) Roberta Vinci** | 1; 1 | French Open | Clay | F | 7–5, 6–2 |
| 14. | (Russia) Elena Vesnina | **(Italy) Sara Errani** **(Italy) Roberta Vinci** | 1; 1 | WTA Finals, Istanbul | Hard (i) | SF | 4–6, 7–5, [10–3] |
2014
| 15. | (Russia) Elena Vesnina | (Czech Republic) **Andrea Hlaváčková** (Czech Republic) Lucie Šafářová | 10; 18 | Australian Open | Hard | QF | 6–2, 2–6, 7–6^{(7–4)} |
2015
| 16. | (Russia) Elena Vesnina | (Zimbabwe) **Cara Black** (United States) Lisa Raymond | 10; 68 | Eastbourne International, UK | Grass | QF | 7–5, 7–5 |
| 17. | (Russia) Elena Vesnina | (Zimbabwe) **Cara Black** (United States) Lisa Raymond | 9; 65 | Wimbledon, UK | Grass | QF | 6–3, 4–6, 8–6 |
| 18. | (Russia) Elena Vesnina | **(Hungary) Tímea Babos** **(France) Kristina Mladenovic** | 8; 7 | Wimbledon, UK | Grass | SF | 6–3, 4–6, 6–4 |
2016
| 19. | (Russia) Elena Vesnina | (Czech Republic) Andrea Hlaváčková (Czech Republic) **Lucie Hradecká** | 12; 10 | Italian Open | Clay | SF | 6–2, 7–5 |
| 20. | (Russia) Elena Vesnina | **(Chinese Taipei) Chan Hao-ching** **(Chinese Taipei) Chan Yung-jan** | 6; 5 | French Open | Clay | QF | 6–1, 6–3 |
| 21. | (Russia) Elena Vesnina | (Switzerland) Timea Bacsinszky (Switzerland) **Martina Hingis** | 379; 1 | Summer Olympics, Rio de Janeiro | Hard | F | 6–4, 6–4 |
| 22. | (Russia) Elena Vesnina | **(Czech Republic) Andrea Hlaváčková** **(Czech Republic) Lucie Hradecká** | 9; 10 | WTA Finals, Singapore | Hard (i) | QF | 6–2, 7–5 |
| 23. | (Russia) Elena Vesnina | **(Switzerland) Martina Hingis** **(India) Sania Mirza** | 4; 1 | WTA Finals, Singapore | Hard (i) | SF | 3–6, 6–2, [10–6] |
| 24. | (Russia) Elena Vesnina | **(United States) Bethanie Mattek-Sands** **(Czech Republic) Lucie Šafářová** | 5; 6 | WTA Finals, Singapore | Hard (i) | F | 7–6^{(7–5)}, 6–3 |
2017
| 25. | (Russia) Elena Vesnina | **(India) Sania Mirza** **(Czech Republic) Barbora Strýcová** | 7; 10 | Dubai Championships, UAE | Hard | SF | 6–4, 6–3 |
| 26. | (Russia) Elena Vesnina | (Czech Republic) **Andrea Hlaváčková** (China) Shuai Peng | 8; 13 | Dubai Championships, UAE | Hard | F | 6–2, 4–6, [10–7] |
| 27. | (Russia) Elena Vesnina | (Hungary) Tímea Babos (Czech Republic) **Andrea Hlaváčková** | 11; 8 | Italian Open | Clay | SF | 6–3, 6–7^{(4–7)}, [10–8] |
| 28. | (Russia) Elena Vesnina | (Australia) Ashleigh Barty (Australia) **Casey Dellacqua** | 13; 10 | Wimbledon, UK | Grass | QF | 6–4, 4–6, 6–4 |
| 29. | (Russia) Elena Vesnina | **(Canada) Gabriela Dabrowski** **(China) Yifan Xu** | 7; 9 | WTA Finals, Singapore | Hard (i) | QF | 6–1, 6–1 |
2018
| 30. | (Russia) Elena Vesnina | **(Canada) Gabriela Dabrowski** **(China) Yifan Xu** | 7; 9 | Australian Open | Hard | QF | 0–6, 6–1, 7–6^{(7–2)} |
| 31. | (Russia) Elena Vesnina | (Hungary) **Tímea Babos** (France) Kristina Mladenovic | 5; 15 | Indian Wells Open, United States | Hard | SF | 6–4, 6–2 |
| 32. | (Russia) Elena Vesnina | **(Hungary) Tímea Babos** **(France) Kristina Mladenovic** | 1; 10 | Madrid Open, Spain | Clay | F | 2–6, 6–4, [10–8] |
| 33. | (Czech Republic) Lucie Hradecká | **(Hungary) Tímea Babos** **(France) Kristina Mladenovic** | 1; 8 | Cincinnati Open, United States | Hard | QF | 4–6, 7–5, [10–6] |
| 33. | (Czech Republic) Lucie Hradecká | (Belgium) Elise Mertens (Netherlands) **Demi Schuurs** | 23; 10 | Cincinnati Open, United States | Hard | F | 6–2, 7–5 |
