= 2017 Italian Open – Men's doubles =

Men's doubles
- 2017 Italian Open

Final
- Champions: (France) Pierre-Hugues Herbert (France) Nicolas Mahut
- Runners-up: (Croatia) Ivan Dodig (Spain) Marcel Granollers
- Score: 4–6, 6–4, [10–3]

Events
Singles	men	women
Doubles	men	women
- Italian Open

Bob and Mike Bryan were the defending champions, but lost in the semifinals to Pierre-Hugues Herbert and Nicolas Mahut.

Herbert and Mahut went on to win the title, defeating Ivan Dodig and Marcel Granollers in the final, 4–6, 6–4, [10–3].

== Seeds ==
All seeds receive a bye into the second round.

1. (Finland) Henri Kontinen / (Australia) John Peers (semifinals)
2. (United States) Bob Bryan / (United States) Mike Bryan (semifinals)
3. (United Kingdom) Jamie Murray / (Brazil) Bruno Soares (second round)
4. (France) Pierre-Hugues Herbert / (France) Nicolas Mahut (champions)
5. (Poland) Łukasz Kubot / (Brazil) Marcelo Melo (quarterfinals)
6. (South Africa) Raven Klaasen / (United States) Rajeev Ram (quarterfinals)
7. (Spain) Feliciano López / (Spain) Marc López (second round)
8. (Croatia) Ivan Dodig / (Spain) Marcel Granollers (final)

== Draw ==
Key

- Q = Qualifier
- WC = Wild card
- LL = Lucky loser
- Alt = Alternate
- ITF = ITF entry
- PR = Protected ranking
- SR = Special ranking
- SE = Special exempt
- JE = Junior exempt
- JR = Junior Accelerator Programme entrant
- CO = College Accelerator Programme entrant
- NG = Next Gen Accelerator Program entrant
- w/o = Walkover
- r = Retired
- d = Defaulted

=== Finals ===
Semifinals
1	(Finland) Henri Kontinen (Australia) John Peers	3	3
8	(Croatia) Ivan Dodig (Spain) Marcel Granollers	6	6
4	(France) Pierre-Hugues Herbert (France) Nicolas Mahut	7^{7}	4	[10]
2	(United States) Bob Bryan (United States) Mike Bryan	6^{5}	6	[7]

Final
8	(Croatia) Ivan Dodig (Spain) Marcel Granollers	6	4	[3]
4	(France) Pierre-Hugues Herbert (France) Nicolas Mahut	4	6	[10]

=== Top half ===
First round
(Portugal) J Sousa (Spain) F Verdasco	6^{6}	6	[10]
(Canada) D Nestor (France) É Roger-Vasselin	7^{8}	4	[6]
PR	(Germany) T Haas (Belarus) M Mirnyi	4	2
(Romania) F Mergea (Pakistan) A-u-H Qureshi	6	6
(Netherlands) J-J Rojer (Romania) H Tecău	4	6	[12]
(United States) J Isner (United States) J Sock	6	4	[14]
WC	(Italy) F Gaio (Italy) S Napolitano	6^{3}	3
(Croatia) N Mektić (Spain) A Ramos Viñolas	7^{7}	6

Second round
1	(Finland) H Kontinen (Australia) J Peers	7	7
(Portugal) J Sousa (Spain) F Verdasco	5	5
(Romania) F Mergea (Pakistan) A-u-H Qureshi	2	3
5	(Poland) Ł Kubot (Brazil) M Melo	6	6
3	(United Kingdom) J Murray (Brazil) B Soares	5	3
(United States) J Isner (United States) J Sock	7	6
(Croatia) N Mektić (Spain) A Ramos Viñolas	1	4
8	(Croatia) I Dodig (Spain) M Granollers	6	6

Quarterfinals
1	(Finland) H Kontinen (Australia) J Peers	6	7^{8}
5	(Poland) Ł Kubot (Brazil) M Melo	4	6^{6}
(United States) J Isner (United States) J Sock	2	6	[6]
8	(Croatia) I Dodig (Spain) M Granollers	6	4	[10]

Semifinals
1	(Finland) H Kontinen (Australia) J Peers	3	3
8	(Croatia) I Dodig (Spain) M Granollers	6	6

=== Bottom half ===
First round
WC	(Italy) S Bolelli (Italy) A Seppi	4	2
(India) R Bopanna (Uruguay) P Cuevas	6	6
(Argentina) JM del Potro (Poland) M Matkowski	6	5	[5]
(United States) B Baker (United States) N Monroe	3	7	[10]
(Austria) O Marach (Croatia) M Pavić	6	3	[10]
Alt	(Philippines) T Huey (New Zealand) M Venus	2	6	[6]
(Germany) A Zverev (Germany) M Zverev	4	6	[11]
(United States) S Querrey (France) G Simon	6	2	[9]

Second round
7	(Spain) F López (Spain) M López	6	6^{7}	[8]
(India) R Bopanna (Uruguay) P Cuevas	4	7^{9}	[10]
(United States) B Baker (United States) N Monroe	2	7^{9}	[10]
4	(France) P-H Herbert (France) N Mahut	6	6^{7}	[12]
6	(South Africa) R Klaasen (United States) R Ram	6	6
(Austria) O Marach (Croatia) M Pavić	3	4
(Germany) A Zverev (Germany) M Zverev
2	(United States) B Bryan (United States) M Bryan	w/o

Quarterfinals
(India) R Bopanna (Uruguay) P Cuevas	6^{5}	7^{7}	[10]
4	(France) P-H Herbert (France) N Mahut	7^{7}	6^{2}	[12]
6	(South Africa) R Klaasen (United States) R Ram	2	7^{7}	[9]
2	(United States) B Bryan (United States) M Bryan	6	6^{2}	[11]

Semifinals
4	(France) P-H Herbert (France) N Mahut	7^{7}	4	[10]
2	(United States) B Bryan (United States) M Bryan	6^{5}	6	[7]
