= 2016 Rogers Cup =

- Date: July 25–31
- Edition: 127th (men) / 115th (women)
- Category: ATP World Tour Masters 1000 (men); WTA Premier 5 (women)
- Surface: Hard / outdoor
- Location: Toronto, Canada (men); Montréal, Canada (women)

Champions

Men's singles
- (Serbia) Novak Djokovic

Women's singles
- (Romania) Simona Halep

Men's doubles
- (Croatia) Ivan Dodig / (Brazil) Marcelo Melo

Women's doubles
- (Russia) Ekaterina Makarova / (Russia) Elena Vesnina
- Canadian Open

The 2016 Rogers Cup presented by National Bank was a tennis tournament played on outdoor hard courts. It was the 127th edition (for the men) and the 114th (for the women) of the Canadian Open. The tournament was part of the ATP World Tour Masters 1000 of the 2016 ATP World Tour, and of the WTA Premier 5 tournaments of the 2016 WTA Tour, and was also a 2016 US Open Series event. The men's event was held at the Aviva Centre in Toronto, from 25 to July 31 and the women's event was held at the Uniprix Stadium in Montreal, from July 25 to July 31. The event was scheduled two weeks earlier than the usual early-August date to avoid conflicting with the 2016 Summer Olympics.

== Points and prize money ==
=== Point distribution ===
Event	W	F	SF	QF	Round of 16	Round of 32	Round of 64	Q	Q2	Q1
Men's singles	1000	600	360	180	90	45	10	25	16	0
Men's doubles	1000	600	360	180	90	0	—N/a	—N/a	—N/a	—N/a
Women's singles	900	585	350	190	105	60	1	30	20	1
Women's doubles	900	585	350	190	105	5	—N/a	—N/a	—N/a	—N/a

=== Prize money ===
Event	W	F	SF	QF	Round of 16	Round of 32	Round of 64	Q2	Q1
Men's singles	$685,200	$336,000	$169,100	$85,985	$44,600	$23,540	$12,710	$2,930	$1,490
Women's singles	$497,700	$241,840	$121,150	$57,690	$27,790	$14,240	$7,680	$3,120	$1,890
Men's doubles	$212,200	$103,890	$52,110	$26,750	$13,830	$7,290	—N/a	—N/a	—N/a
Women's doubles	$142,375	$71,920	$35,604	$17,920	$9,090	$4,490	—N/a	—N/a	—N/a

== ATP singles main-draw entrants ==
=== Seeds ===
Country	Player	Rank^{1}	Seed
SRB	Novak Djokovic	1	1
SUI	Stan Wawrinka	5	2
JPN	Kei Nishikori	6	3
CAN	Milos Raonic	7	4
CZE	Tomáš Berdych	8	5
AUT	Dominic Thiem	9	6
BEL	David Goffin	11	7
CRO	Marin Čilić	12	8
USA	John Isner	16	9
FRA	Gaël Monfils	17	10
AUS	Nick Kyrgios	18	11
AUS	Bernard Tomic	19	12
FRA	Lucas Pouille	22	13
FRA	Benoît Paire	24	14
USA	Steve Johnson	25	15
USA	Jack Sock	26	16

- ^{1}Rankings are as of July 18, 2016

=== Other entrants ===
The following players received wild cards into the main singles draw:

- (Canada) Frank Dancevic
- (Canada) Steven Diez
- (Canada) Peter Polansky
- (Canada) Denis Shapovalov

The following players received entry using a protected ranking into the main singles draw:

- (Russia) Dmitry Tursunov

The following players received entry from the singles qualifying draw:

- (United States) Jared Donaldson
- (Ecuador) Emilio Gómez
- (Colombia) Alejandro González
- (United States) Ryan Harrison
- (United States) Dennis Novikov
- (United States) Tim Smyczek
- (Czech Republic) Radek Štěpánek

=== Withdrawals ===
Before the tournament

- (Cyprus) Marcos Baghdatis →replaced by (Canada) Vasek Pospisil
- (Spain) Roberto Bautista Agut →replaced by (Croatia) Borna Ćorić
- (Uruguay) Pablo Cuevas →replaced by (Latvia) Ernests Gulbis
- (Switzerland) Roger Federer →replaced by (United States) Denis Kudla
- (Spain) David Ferrer →replaced by (United States) Taylor Fritz
- (France) Richard Gasquet →replaced by (Australia) John Millman
- (Germany) Philipp Kohlschreiber →replaced by (Israel) Dudi Sela
- (Spain) Feliciano López →replaced by (Russia) Mikhail Youzhny
- (United Kingdom) Andy Murray →replaced by (Croatia) Ivan Dodig
- (Spain) Rafael Nadal →replaced by (United States) Rajeev Ram
- (Spain) Albert Ramos Viñolas →replaced by (United States) Donald Young
- (Italy) Andreas Seppi →replaced by replaced by (Chinese Taipei) Lu Yen-hsun
- (France) Gilles Simon →replaced by (France) Stéphane Robert
- (Serbia) Janko Tipsarević →replaced by (United Kingdom) Kyle Edmund
- (France) Jo-Wilfried Tsonga →replaced by (Russia) Dmitry Tursunov

=== Retirements ===
- (France) Jérémy Chardy
- (United States) Sam Querrey
- (Austria) Dominic Thiem

== ATP doubles main-draw entrants ==
=== Seeds ===
Country	Player	Country	Player	Rank^{1}	Seed
USA	Bob Bryan	USA	Mike Bryan	7	1
GBR	Jamie Murray	BRA	Bruno Soares	13	2
CRO	Ivan Dodig	BRA	Marcelo Melo	20	3
IND	Rohan Bopanna	NED	Jean-Julien Rojer	27	4
ROU	Florin Mergea	ROU	Horia Tecău	28	5
CAN	Daniel Nestor	CAN	Vasek Pospisil	30	6
RSA	Raven Klaasen	USA	Rajeev Ram	34	7
FIN	Henri Kontinen	AUS	John Peers	42	8

- Rankings are as of July 18, 2016

=== Other entrants ===
The following pairs received wildcards into the doubles main draw:

- (Canada) Félix Auger-Aliassime / (Canada) Denis Shapovalov
- (Canada) Philip Bester / (Canada) Adil Shamasdin

=== Retirements ===
- (United States) Jack Sock

== WTA singles main-draw entrants ==
=== Seeds ===
Country	Player	Rank^{1}	Seed
~~USA~~	~~Serena Williams~~	~~1~~	~~1~~
GER	Angelique Kerber	2	2
~~ESP~~	~~Garbiñe Muguruza~~	~~3~~	~~3~~
POL	Agnieszka Radwańska	4	4
ROU	Simona Halep	5	5
USA	Venus Williams	7	6
ITA	Roberta Vinci	8	7
ESP	Carla Suárez Navarro	9	8
RUS	Svetlana Kuznetsova	10	9
USA	Madison Keys	11	10
SVK	Dominika Cibulková	12	11
CZE	Petra Kvitová	13	12
AUS	Samantha Stosur	14	13
CZE	Karolína Plíšková	17	14
GBR	Johanna Konta	18	15
RUS	Anastasia Pavlyuchenkova	19	16
UKR	Elina Svitolina	20	17

- ^{1} Rankings are as of July 18, 2016

=== Other entrants ===
The following players received wild cards into the main singles draw:

- (Canada) Françoise Abanda
- (France) Caroline Garcia
- (Canada) Aleksandra Wozniak

The following players received entry from the singles qualifying draw:

- (Ukraine) Kateryna Bondarenko
- (United States) Jennifer Brady
- (United Kingdom) Naomi Broady
- (Colombia) Mariana Duque Mariño
- (Italy) Camila Giorgi
- (Japan) Nao Hibino
- (United States) Vania King
- (Slovakia) Kristína Kučová
- (Russia) Alla Kudryavtseva
- (Poland) Magda Linette
- (China) Zhang Shuai
- (China) Zheng Saisai

The following player received entry as alternate:

- (United States) Madison Brengle

The following players received entry as lucky losers:

- (United States) Varvara Lepchenko
- (United States) Christina McHale

=== Withdrawals ===
Before the tournament

- (Belarus) Victoria Azarenka (pregnancy) → replaced by (Belgium) Yanina Wickmayer
- (Romania) Irina-Camelia Begu → replaced by (United Kingdom) Heather Watson
- (Switzerland) Belinda Bencic (left wrist injury) → replaced by (Australia) Daria Gavrilova
- (Serbia) Jelena Janković (leg strain) → replaced by (Japan) Misaki Doi
- (Spain) Garbiñe Muguruza (gastrointestinal illness) → replaced by (United States) Varvara Lepchenko
- (Ukraine) Lesia Tsurenko (left thigh injury) → replaced by (Russia) Elena Vesnina
- (United States) CoCo Vandeweghe → replaced by (United States) Madison Brengle
- (United States) Serena Williams (shoulder inflammation) → replaced by (United States) Christina McHale
- (Denmark) Caroline Wozniacki (left elbow) → replaced by (Croatia) Mirjana Lučić-Baroni

During the tournament

- (Italy) Sara Errani

=== Retirements ===
- (China) Zhang Shuai

== WTA doubles main-draw entrants ==
=== Seeds ===
Country	Player	Country	Player	Rank^{1}	Seed
SUI	Martina Hingis	IND	Sania Mirza	2	1
FRA	Caroline Garcia	FRA	Kristina Mladenovic	7	2
TPE	Chan Hao-ching	TPE	Chan Yung-jan	11	3
RUS	Ekaterina Makarova	RUS	Elena Vesnina	20	4
HUN	Tímea Babos	CZE	Lucie Šafářová	29	5
CHN	Xu Yifan	CHN	Zheng Saisai	31	6
USA	Raquel Atawo	USA	Abigail Spears	40	7
CZE	Karolína Plíšková	CZE	Barbora Strýcová	52	8

- Rankings are as of July 18, 2016

=== Other entrants ===
The following pairs received wildcards into the doubles main draw:

- (Canada) Eugenie Bouchard / (Canada) Carol Zhao
- (Australia) Daria Gavrilova / (Australia) Samantha Stosur
- (Romania) Simona Halep / (Romania) Monica Niculescu
- (Germany) Angelique Kerber / (Germany) Andrea Petkovic

The following pair received entry as alternates:

- (United States) Madison Brengle / (United Kingdom) Tara Moore

=== Withdrawals ===
Before the tournament

- (Spain) Garbiñe Muguruza

=== Retirements ===
- (Chinese Taipei) Chan Hao-ching

== Finals ==
=== Men's singles ===
- (Serbia) Novak Djokovic defeated (Japan) Kei Nishikori, 6–3, 7–5

=== Women's singles ===
- (Romania) Simona Halep defeated (United States) Madison Keys, 7–6^{(7–2)}, 6–3

=== Men's doubles ===
- (Croatia) Ivan Dodig / (Brazil) Marcelo Melo defeated (United Kingdom) Jamie Murray / (Brazil) Bruno Soares, 6–4, 6–4

=== Women's doubles ===
- (Russia) Ekaterina Makarova / (Russia) Elena Vesnina defeated (Romania) Simona Halep / (Romania) Monica Niculescu, 6–3, 7–6^{(7–5)}
