= 2016 Rogers Cup – Men's doubles =

Men's doubles
- 2016 Rogers Cup

Final
- Champions: (Croatia) Ivan Dodig (Brazil) Marcelo Melo
- Runners-up: (United Kingdom) Jamie Murray (Brazil) Bruno Soares
- Score: 6–4, 6–4

Details
- Draw: 28
- Seeds: 8

Events
Singles	men	women
Doubles	men	women
- Rogers Cup

Bob and Mike Bryan were the defending champions, but lost in the quarterfinals to Florin Mergea and Horia Tecău.

Ivan Dodig and Marcelo Melo won the title, defeating Jamie Murray and Bruno Soares in the final, 6–4, 6–4.

== Seeds ==
All seeds received a bye into the second round.

1. (United States) Bob Bryan / (United States) Mike Bryan (quarterfinals)
2. (United Kingdom) Jamie Murray / (Brazil) Bruno Soares (final)
3. (Croatia) Ivan Dodig / (Brazil) Marcelo Melo (champions)
4. (India) Rohan Bopanna / (Netherlands) Jean-Julien Rojer (second round)
5. (Romania) Florin Mergea / (Romania) Horia Tecău (semifinals)
6. (Canada) Daniel Nestor / (Canada) Vasek Pospisil (semifinals)
7. (South Africa) Raven Klaasen / (United States) Rajeev Ram (quarterfinals)
8. (Finland) Henri Kontinen / (Australia) John Peers (quarterfinals)

== Draw ==
Key

- Q = Qualifier
- WC = Wild card
- LL = Lucky loser
- Alt = Alternate
- ITF = ITF entry
- PR = Protected ranking
- SR = Special ranking
- SE = Special exempt
- JE = Junior exempt
- JR = Junior Accelerator Programme entrant
- CO = College Accelerator Programme entrant
- NG = Next Gen Accelerator Program entrant
- w/o = Walkover
- r = Retired
- d = Defaulted

=== Finals ===
Semifinals
5	(Romania) Florin Mergea (Romania) Horia Tecău	4	3
3	(Croatia) Ivan Dodig (Brazil) Marcelo Melo	6	6
6	(Canada) Daniel Nestor (Canada) Vasek Pospisil	4	7^{7}	[7]
2	(United Kingdom) Jamie Murray (Brazil) Bruno Soares	6	6^{5}	[10]

Final
3	(Croatia) Ivan Dodig (Brazil) Marcelo Melo	6	6
2	(United Kingdom) Jamie Murray (Brazil) Bruno Soares	4	4

=== Top half ===
First round
(Poland) M Matkowski (Belarus) M Mirnyi	6	7^{7}
(Poland) Ł Kubot (Austria) A Peya	3	6^{5}
(Sweden) R Lindstedt (United States) S Querrey	6^{4}	3
(United States) J Isner (Germany) A Zverev	7^{7}	6
(France) J Benneteau (France) É Roger-Vasselin	3	4
PR	(Croatia) M Čilić (Croatia) M Draganja	6	6
(Bulgaria) G Dimitrov (Switzerland) S Wawrinka	4	7^{7}	[12]
(France) L Pouille (Austria) D Thiem	6	6^{2}	[10]

Second round
1	(United States) B Bryan (United States) M Bryan	6	6
(Poland) M Matkowski (Belarus) M Mirnyi	4	4
(United States) J Isner (Germany) A Zverev	6^{1}	0
5	(Romania) F Mergea (Romania) H Tecău	7^{7}	6
3	(Croatia) I Dodig (Brazil) M Melo	7^{7}	6^{4}	[10]
PR	(Croatia) M Čilić (Croatia) M Draganja	6^{3}	7^{7}	[5]
(Bulgaria) G Dimitrov (Switzerland) S Wawrinka	6^{4}	2
8	(Finland) H Kontinen (Australia) J Peers	7^{7}	6

Quarterfinals
1	(United States) B Bryan (United States) M Bryan	3	3
5	(Romania) F Mergea (Romania) H Tecău	6	6
3	(Croatia) I Dodig (Brazil) M Melo	3	6	[10]
8	(Finland) H Kontinen (Australia) J Peers	6	4	[8]

Semifinals
5	(Romania) F Mergea (Romania) H Tecău	4	3
3	(Croatia) I Dodig (Brazil) M Melo	6	6

=== Bottom half ===
First round
(Luxembourg) G Müller (France) B Paire	4	2
(Australia) N Kyrgios (United States) J Sock	6	6
(France) F Martin (Portugal) J Sousa	1	6	[9]
(Czech Republic) T Berdych (Czech Republic) R Štěpánek	6	3	[11]
(Serbia) N Djokovic (Serbia) N Zimonjić	5	6	[2]
WC	(Canada) P Bester (Canada) A Shamasdin	7	4	[10]
(Australia) B Tomic (Serbia) V Troicki	6	6
WC	(Canada) F Auger-Aliassime (Canada) D Shapovalov	4	3

Second round
6	(Canada) D Nestor (Canada) V Pospisil	7^{7}	0
(Australia) N Kyrgios (United States) J Sock	6^{4}	1^{r}
(Czech Republic) T Berdych (Czech Republic) R Štěpánek	6	6
4	(India) R Bopanna (Netherlands) J-J Rojer	1	4
7	(South Africa) R Klaasen (United States) R Ram	6	7^{7}
WC	(Canada) P Bester (Canada) A Shamasdin	4	6^{4}
(Australia) B Tomic (Serbia) V Troicki	3	2
2	(United Kingdom) J Murray (Brazil) B Soares	6	6

Quarterfinals
6	(Canada) D Nestor (Canada) V Pospisil	6	7^{8}
(Czech Republic) T Berdych (Czech Republic) R Štěpánek	3	6^{6}
7	(South Africa) R Klaasen (United States) R Ram	6	5	[4]
2	(United Kingdom) J Murray (Brazil) B Soares	3	7	[10]

Semifinals
6	(Canada) D Nestor (Canada) V Pospisil	4	7^{7}	[7]
2	(United Kingdom) J Murray (Brazil) B Soares	6	6^{5}	[10]
