= 2016 Rogers Cup – Men's singles =

Men's singles
- 2016 Rogers Cup

Final
- Champion: (Serbia) Novak Djokovic
- Runner-up: (Japan) Kei Nishikori
- Score: 6–3, 7–5

Events
Singles	men	women
Doubles	men	women
← 2015 ·	Rogers Cup	· 2017 →

Novak Djokovic defeated Kei Nishikori in the final, 6–3, 7–5 to win the men's singles tennis title at the 2016 Rogers Cup. It was his record 30th Masters 1000 title and his record 43rd Masters 1000 final. He did not lose a single set in the entire tournament.

Andy Murray was the reigning champion, but did not participate this year, citing fatigue.

== Seeds ==
The top eight seeds receive a bye into the second round.

1. (Serbia) Novak Djokovic (champion)
2. (Switzerland) Stan Wawrinka (semifinals)
3. (Japan) Kei Nishikori (final)
4. (Canada) Milos Raonic (quarterfinals)
5. (Czech Republic) Tomáš Berdych (quarterfinals)
6. (Austria) Dominic Thiem (second round, retired)
7. (Belgium) David Goffin (third round)
8. (Croatia) Marin Čilić (second round)

9. (United States) John Isner (second round)
10. (France) Gaël Monfils (semifinals)
11. (Australia) Nick Kyrgios (first round)
12. (Australia) Bernard Tomic (third round)
13. (France) Lucas Pouille (second round)
14. (France) Benoît Paire (first round)
15. (United States) Steve Johnson (first round)
16. (United States) Jack Sock (third round)

Click on the seed number of a player to go to their draw section.

== Draw ==
=== Key ===
- Q = Qualifier
- WC = Wild card
- LL = Lucky loser
- Alt = Alternate
- SE = Special exempt
- PR = Protected ranking
- ITF = ITF entry
- JE = Junior exempt
- w/o = Walkover
- r = Retired
- d = Defaulted
- SR = Special ranking

=== Finals ===
Quarterfinals
1	(Serbia) Novak Djokovic	7^{8}	6
5	(Czech Republic) Tomáš Berdych	6^{6}	4
4	(Canada) Milos Raonic	4	4
10	(France) Gaël Monfils	6	6
(Bulgaria) Grigor Dimitrov	3	6	2
3	(Japan) Kei Nishikori	6	3	6
(South Africa) Kevin Anderson	1	3
2	(Switzerland) Stan Wawrinka	6	6

Semifinals
1	(Serbia) Novak Djokovic	6	6
10	(France) Gaël Monfils	3	2
3	(Japan) Kei Nishikori	7^{8}	6
2	(Switzerland) Stan Wawrinka	6^{6}	1

Final
1	(Serbia) Novak Djokovic	6	7
3	(Japan) Kei Nishikori	3	5

=== Top half ===
==== Section 1 ====
First round
PR	(Russia) D Tursunov	6^{5}	1
(Luxembourg) G Müller	7^{7}	6
WC	(Canada) P Polansky	4	6	6
Q	(United States) T Smyczek	6	3	0
Q	(Czech Republic) R Štěpánek	6	6
14	(France) B Paire	1	3
9	(United States) J Isner	4	6	6
(Israel) D Sela	6	3	2
(Russia) A Kuznetsov	3	1
Q	(United States) R Harrison	6	6
(Croatia) B Ćorić	5	6	6
(Croatia) I Dodig	7	4	2

Second round
1	(Serbia) N Djokovic	7	7^{7}
(Luxembourg) G Müller	5	6^{3}
WC	(Canada) P Polansky	6^{5}	4
Q	(Czech Republic) R Štěpánek	7^{7}	6
9	(United States) J Isner	6^{3}	7^{7}	4
Q	(United States) R Harrison	7^{7}	6^{4}	6
(Croatia) B Ćorić	6	1	4
5	(Czech Republic) T Berdych	4	6	6

Third round
1	(Serbia) N Djokovic	6	6
Q	(Czech Republic) R Štěpánek	2	4
Q	(United States) R Harrison	4	7^{7}	4
5	(Czech Republic) T Berdych	6	6^{2}	6

Quarterfinals
1	(Serbia) N Djokovic	7^{8}	6
5	(Czech Republic) T Berdych	6^{6}	4

==== Section 2 ====
First round
(Chinese Taipei) Y-h Lu	7	6
(Germany) A Zverev	5	3
(Australia) J Millman	4	3^{r}
Q	(United States) J Donaldson	6	4
(Italy) F Fognini	6	6
15	(United States) S Johnson	4	4
10	(France) G Monfils	6	6
(Portugal) J Sousa	3	3
(Canada) V Pospisil	7^{7}	0
(France) J Chardy	6^{3}	0^{r}
WC	(Canada) F Dancevic	6^{5}	4
(United States) S Querrey	7^{7}	6

Second round
4	(Canada) M Raonic	6	6
(Chinese Taipei) Y-h Lu	3	3
Q	(United States) J Donaldson	6	3	6
(Italy) F Fognini	3	6	3
10	(France) G Monfils	7^{8}	6
(Canada) V Pospisil	6^{6}	0
(United States) S Querrey	4	1^{r}
7	(Belgium) D Goffin	6	2

Third round
4	(Canada) M Raonic	6	6
Q	(United States) J Donaldson	2	3
10	(France) G Monfils	7^{7}	2	6
7	(Belgium) D Goffin	6^{5}	6	4

Quarterfinals
4	(Canada) M Raonic	4	4
10	(France) G Monfils	6	6

=== Bottom half ===
==== Section 3 ====
First round
(Croatia) I Karlović	6^{9}	7^{7}	6
(United States) T Fritz	7^{11}	6^{5}	2
(Japan) Y Sugita	7	6^{5}	4
(Bulgaria) G Dimitrov	5	7^{7}	6
WC	(Canada) D Shapovalov	7^{7}	3	6
11	(Australia) N Kyrgios	6^{2}	6	3
13	(France) L Pouille	6^{8}	6	7
Q	(Ecuador) E Gómez	7^{10}	4	5
(Latvia) E Gulbis	4	2
(United States) R Ram	6	6
Q	(United States) D Novikov	6	6
(Argentina) F Delbonis	4	3

Second round
8	(Croatia) M Čilić	4	6^{3}
(Croatia) I Karlović	6	7^{7}
(Bulgaria) G Dimitrov	6	6
WC	(Canada) D Shapovalov	4	3
13	(France) L Pouille	4	6^{5}
(United States) R Ram	6	7^{7}
Q	(United States) D Novikov	4	5
3	(Japan) K Nishikori	6	7

Third round
(Croatia) I Karlović	3	5
(Bulgaria) G Dimitrov	6	7
(United States) R Ram	3	4
3	(Japan) K Nishikori	6	6

Quarterfinals
(Bulgaria) G Dimitrov	3	6	2
3	(Japan) K Nishikori	6	3	6

==== Section 4 ====
First round
(Serbia) V Troicki	6^{4}	3
(South Africa) K Anderson	7^{7}	6
WC	(Canada) S Diez	3	6	6
(United Kingdom) K Edmund	6	3	2
Q	(Colombia) A González	4	6^{1}
12	(Australia) B Tomic	6	7^{7}
16	(United States) J Sock	6	6
(United States) D Kudla	2	2
(United States) D Young	7^{8}	6
(Ukraine) A Dolgopolov	6^{6}	4
(Russia) M Youzhny	6	7^{8}
(France) S Robert	3	6^{6}

Second round
6	(Austria) D Thiem	1^{r}
(South Africa) K Anderson	4
WC	(Canada) S Diez	3	6^{4}
12	(Australia) B Tomic	6	7^{7}
16	(United States) J Sock	6	6
(United States) D Young	4	3
(Russia) M Youzhny	6^{3}	6^{8}
2	(Switzerland) S Wawrinka	7^{7}	7^{10}

Third round
(South Africa) K Anderson	4	6	6
12	(Australia) B Tomic	6	3	4
16	(United States) J Sock	6^{3}	2
2	(Switzerland) S Wawrinka	7^{7}	6

Quarterfinals
(South Africa) K Anderson	1	3
2	(Switzerland) S Wawrinka	6	6

== Qualifying ==
=== Seeds ===
1. (Japan) Yūichi Sugita (moved to main draw)
2. (Czech Republic) Radek Štěpánek (qualified)
3. (United States) Tim Smyczek (qualified)
4. (United States) Dennis Novikov (qualified)
5. (United States) Austin Krajicek (qualifying competition)
6. (Germany) Mischa Zverev (qualifying competition)
7. (France) Vincent Millot (first round)
8. (India) Saketh Myneni (qualifying competition)
9. (United States) Jared Donaldson (qualified)
10. (Australia) Sam Groth (first round)
11. (United States) Ryan Harrison (qualified)
12. (Colombia) Alejandro González (qualified)
13. (Australia) Matthew Barton (first round)
14. (Australia) James Duckworth (qualifying competition)

=== Qualifiers ===
1. (Colombia) Alejandro González
2. (Czech Republic) Radek Štěpánek
3. (United States) Tim Smyczek
4. (United States) Dennis Novikov
5. (Ecuador) Emilio Gómez
6. (United States) Ryan Harrison
7. (United States) Jared Donaldson

=== Qualifying draw ===
==== First qualifier ====
First round
Alt	(Canada) Kelsey Stevenson	2	2
(Canada) Philip Bester	6	6
WC	(Canada) Benjamin Sigouin	6^{2}	4
12	(Colombia) Alejandro González	7^{7}	6

Qualifying competition
(Canada) Philip Bester	1	6^{4}
12	(Colombia) Alejandro González	6	7^{7}

==== Second qualifier ====
First round
2/Alt	(Czech Republic) Radek Štěpánek	6	7^{8}
Alt	(Canada) Brayden Schnur	4	6^{6}
Alt	(France) Fabrice Martin	6^{2}	2
8	(India) Saketh Myneni	7^{7}	6

Qualifying competition
2/Alt	(Czech Republic) Radek Štěpánek	7^{7}	6^{5}	6
8	(India) Saketh Myneni	6^{5}	7^{7}	4

==== Third qualifier ====
First round
3	(United States) Tim Smyczek	6	6
WC	(Canada) Jack Mingjie Lin	1	3
(Republic of Ireland) James McGee	6	3	6
10	(Australia) Sam Groth	3	6	3

Qualifying competition
3	(United States) Tim Smyczek	7	4	7
(Republic of Ireland) James McGee	5	6	5

==== Fourth qualifier ====
First round
4	(United States) Dennis Novikov	4	6	6
(Colombia) Alejandro Falla	6	4	3
(Canada) Félix Auger-Aliassime	5	6^{3}
14	(Australia) James Duckworth	7	7^{7}

Qualifying competition
4	(United States) Dennis Novikov	6	0	7^{7}
14	(Australia) James Duckworth	4	6	6^{5}

==== Fifth qualifier ====
First round
5	(United States) Austin Krajicek	6	7^{7}
(United States) Michael Mmoh	3	6^{4}
(Ecuador) Emilio Gómez	7^{7}	7
13	(Australia) Matthew Barton	6^{3}	5

Qualifying competition
5	(United States) Austin Krajicek	4	6^{8}
(Ecuador) Emilio Gómez	6	7^{10}

==== Sixth qualifier ====
First round
6	(Germany) Mischa Zverev	6	6
WC	(Canada) Pavel Krainik	2	0
(Republic of Ireland) Sam Barry	6^{5}	5
11	(United States) Ryan Harrison	7^{7}	7

Qualifying competition
6	(Germany) Mischa Zverev	7	3	3
11	(United States) Ryan Harrison	5	6	6

==== Seventh qualifier ====
First round
7	(France) Vincent Millot	6^{5}	2
(Israel) Amir Weintraub	7^{7}	6
WC	(Canada) Christian Lakoseljac	1	1
9	(United States) Jared Donaldson	6	6

Qualifying competition
(Israel) Amir Weintraub	4	3
9	(United States) Jared Donaldson	6	6
