= 2016 Rogers Cup – Women's doubles =

Women's doubles
- 2016 Rogers Cup

Final
- Champions: (Russia) Ekaterina Makarova (Russia) Elena Vesnina
- Runners-up: (Romania) Simona Halep (Romania) Monica Niculescu
- Score: 6–3, 7–6^{(7–5)}

Details
- Draw: 28
- Seeds: 8

Events
Singles	men	women
Doubles	men	women
- Rogers Cup

Bethanie Mattek-Sands and Lucie Šafářová were the defending champions, but decided not to compete together. Mattek-Sands played alongside Heather Watson, but lost in the quarterfinals to Andreja Klepač and Katarina Srebotnik. Šafářová teamed up with Tímea Babos, but lost in the first round to Kateryna Bondarenko and Olga Savchuk.

Ekaterina Makarova and Elena Vesnina won the title, defeating Simona Halep and Monica Niculescu in the final, 6–3, 7–6^{(7–5)}.

== Seeds ==
The top four seeds received a bye into the second round.

1. (Switzerland) Martina Hingis / (India) Sania Mirza (quarterfinals)
2. (France) Caroline Garcia / (France) Kristina Mladenovic (quarterfinals)
3. (Chinese Taipei) Chan Hao-ching / (Chinese Taipei) Chan Yung-jan (second round, retired)
4. (Russia) Ekaterina Makarova / (Russia) Elena Vesnina (champions)
5. (Hungary) Tímea Babos / (Czech Republic) Lucie Šafářová (first round)
6. (China) Xu Yifan / (China) Zheng Saisai (first round)
7. (United States) Raquel Atawo / (United States) Abigail Spears (second round)
8. (Czech Republic) Karolína Plíšková / (Czech Republic) Barbora Strýcová (second round)

== Draw ==
Key

- Q = Qualifier
- WC = Wild card
- LL = Lucky loser
- Alt = Alternate
- ITF = ITF entry
- PR = Protected ranking
- SR = Special ranking
- SE = Special exempt
- JE = Junior exempt
- JR = Junior Accelerator Programme entrant
- CO = College Accelerator Programme entrant
- NG = Next Gen Accelerator Program entrant
- w/o = Walkover
- r = Retired
- d = Defaulted

=== Finals ===
Semifinals
(United States) Christina McHale (United States) Asia Muhammad	4	2
4	(Russia) Ekaterina Makarova (Russia) Elena Vesnina	6	6
(Slovenia) Andreja Klepač (Slovenia) Katarina Srebotnik	3	6	[6]
WC	(Romania) Simona Halep (Romania) Monica Niculescu	6	2	[10]

Final
4	(Russia) Ekaterina Makarova (Russia) Elena Vesnina	6	7^{7}
WC	(Romania) Simona Halep (Romania) Monica Niculescu	3	6^{5}

=== Top half ===
First round
(Japan) E Hozumi (Argentina) M Irigoyen	3	2
(United Kingdom) N Broady (United States) S Rogers	6	6
WC	(Germany) A Kerber (Germany) A Petkovic	7	5	[6]
(United States) C McHale (United States) A Muhammad	5	7	[10]
WC	(Canada) E Bouchard (Canada) C Zhao	2	2
7	(United States) R Atawo (United States) A Spears	6	6
(Latvia) J Ostapenko (Ukraine) E Svitolina	6	5	[6]
(Japan) N Hibino (Poland) A Rosolska	4	7	[10]
WC	(Australia) D Gavrilova (Australia) S Stosur	4	6	[10]
(Chinese Taipei) C-j Chuang (Russia) A Pavlyuchenkova	6	3	[8]
(China) C Liang (United States) N Melichar	2	4
8	(Czech Republic) Ka Plíšková (Czech Republic) B Strýcová	6	6

Second round
1	(Switzerland) M Hingis (India) S Mirza	6	6
(United Kingdom) N Broady (United States) S Rogers	1	1
(United States) C McHale (United States) A Muhammad	2	6	[11]
7	(United States) R Atawo (United States) A Spears	6	4	[9]
4	(Russia) E Makarova (Russia) E Vesnina	6	7^{7}
(Japan) N Hibino (Poland) A Rosolska	3	6^{3}
WC	(Australia) D Gavrilova (Australia) S Stosur	6	3	[10]
8	(Czech Republic) Ka Plíšková (Czech Republic) B Strýcová	3	6	[5]

Quarterfinals
1	(Switzerland) M Hingis (India) S Mirza	4	3
(United States) C McHale (United States) A Muhammad	6	6
4	(Russia) E Makarova (Russia) E Vesnina	7^{7}	6
WC	(Australia) D Gavrilova (Australia) S Stosur	6^{1}	0

Semifinals
(United States) C McHale (United States) A Muhammad	4	2
4	(Russia) E Makarova (Russia) E Vesnina	6	6

=== Bottom half ===
First round
6	(China) Y Xu (China) S Zheng	4	3
(Croatia) D Jurak (Australia) An Rodionova	6	6
(Slovenia) A Klepač (Slovenia) K Srebotnik	1	7^{7}	[12]
(Italy) S Errani (Italy) R Vinci	6	6^{4}	[10]
(United States) B Mattek-Sands (United Kingdom) H Watson	6	6
(Russia) D Kasatkina (Russia) S Kuznetsova	2	4
5	(Hungary) T Babos (Czech Republic) L Šafářová	2	2
(Ukraine) K Bondarenko (Ukraine) O Savchuk	6	6
WC	(Romania) S Halep (Romania) M Niculescu	6	6
(Canada) G Dabrowski (Russia) A Kudryavtseva	3	2
Alt	(United States) M Brengle (United Kingdom) T Moore	0	4
(Germany) A-L Grönefeld (Czech Republic) K Peschke	6	6

Second round
(Croatia) D Jurak (Australia) An Rodionova	2	1
(Slovenia) A Klepač (Slovenia) K Srebotnik	6	6
(United States) B Mattek-Sands (United Kingdom) H Watson	3
3	(Chinese Taipei) H-c Chan (Chinese Taipei) Y-j Chan	3^{r}
(Ukraine) K Bondarenko (Ukraine) O Savchuk	1	3
WC	(Romania) S Halep (Romania) M Niculescu	6	6
(Germany) A-L Grönefeld (Czech Republic) K Peschke	6	5	[4]
2	(France) C Garcia (France) K Mladenovic	4	7	[10]

Quarterfinals
(Slovenia) A Klepač (Slovenia) K Srebotnik	6	4	[10]
(United States) B Mattek-Sands (United Kingdom) H Watson	3	6	[7]
WC	(Romania) S Halep (Romania) M Niculescu	6	3	[10]
2	(France) C Garcia (France) K Mladenovic	4	6	[8]

Semifinals
(Slovenia) A Klepač (Slovenia) K Srebotnik	3	6	[6]
WC	(Romania) S Halep (Romania) M Niculescu	6	2	[10]
