= 2016 Rogers Cup – Women's singles =

Women's singles
- 2016 Rogers Cup

Final
- Champion: (Romania) Simona Halep
- Runner-up: (United States) Madison Keys
- Score: 7–6^{(7–2)}, 6–3

Details
- Draw: 56 (12 Q / 3 WC )
- Seeds: 16

Events
Singles	men	women
Doubles	men	women
- Rogers Cup

Simona Halep defeated Madison Keys in the final, 7–6^{(7–2)}, 6–3 to win the women's singles tennis title at the 2016 Canadian Open.

Belinda Bencic was the reigning champion, but withdrew with a left wrist injury before the tournament.

== Seeds ==
The top eight seeds received a bye into the second round.

1. (United States) Serena Williams (withdrew)
2. (Germany) Angelique Kerber (semifinals)
3. (Spain) Garbiñe Muguruza (withdrew)
4. (Poland) Agnieszka Radwańska (third round)
5. (Romania) Simona Halep (champion)
6. (United States) Venus Williams (third round)
7. (Italy) Roberta Vinci (third round)
8. (Spain) Carla Suárez Navarro (second round)
9. (Russia) Svetlana Kuznetsova (quarterfinals)
10. (United States) Madison Keys (final)
11. (Slovakia) Dominika Cibulková (second round)
12. (Czech Republic) Petra Kvitová (third round)
13. (Australia) Samantha Stosur (second round)
14. (Czech Republic) Karolína Plíšková (third round)
15. (United Kingdom) Johanna Konta (quarterfinals)
16. (Russia) Anastasia Pavlyuchenkova (quarterfinals)
17. (Ukraine) Elina Svitolina (third round)

Click on the seed number of a player to go to their draw section.

== Draw ==
Key

- Q = Qualifier
- WC = Wild card
- LL = Lucky loser
- Alt = Alternate
- ITF = ITF entry
- PR = Protected ranking
- SR = Special ranking
- SE = Special exempt
- JE = Junior exempt
- JR = Junior Accelerator Programme entrant
- CO = College Accelerator Programme entrant
- NG = Next Gen Accelerator Program entrant
- w/o = Walkover
- r = Retired
- d = Defaulted

=== Finals ===
Quarterfinals
15	(United Kingdom) Johanna Konta	4	3
Q	(Slovakia) Kristína Kučová	6	6
16	(Russia) Anastasia Pavlyuchenkova	6^{3}	6	0
10	(United States) Madison Keys	7^{7}	1	6
9	(Russia) Svetlana Kuznetsova	6	1	1
5	(Romania) Simona Halep	3	6	6
(Russia) Daria Kasatkina	2	2
2	(Germany) Angelique Kerber	6	6

Semifinals
Q	(Slovakia) Kristína Kučová	2	1
10	(United States) Madison Keys	6	6
5	(Romania) Simona Halep	6	3	6
2	(Germany) Angelique Kerber	0	6	2

Final
10	(United States) Madison Keys	6^{2}	3
5	(Romania) Simona Halep	7^{7}	6

=== Top half ===
==== Section 1 ====
First round
Q	(United Kingdom) N Broady	3	6	6
(Puerto Rico) M Puig	6	4	2
(Hungary) T Babos	4	6	6^{5}
Q	(United States) V King	6	3	7^{7}
(United States) S Rogers	4	2
15	(United Kingdom) J Konta	6	6
11	(Slovakia) D Cibulková	6	6
Q	(Colombia) M Duque Mariño	2	2
(Czech Republic) L Šafářová	3	6	6^{3}
(Canada) E Bouchard	6	3	7^{7}
(Belgium) Y Wickmayer	6	2	3
Q	(Slovakia) K Kučová	4	6	6

Second round
LL	(United States) V Lepchenko	6	3	6
Q	(United Kingdom) N Broady	4	6	3
Q	(United States) V King	5	1
15	(United Kingdom) J Konta	7	6
11	(Slovakia) D Cibulková	2	0
(Canada) E Bouchard	6	6
Q	(Slovakia) K Kučová	3	6	6
8	(Spain) C Suárez Navarro	6	4	4

Third round
LL	(United States) V Lepchenko	3	2
15	(United Kingdom) J Konta	6	6
(Canada) E Bouchard	6	4	3
Q	(Slovakia) K Kučová	3	6	6

Quarterfinals
15	(United Kingdom) J Konta	4	3
Q	(Slovakia) K Kučová	6	6

==== Section 2 ====
First round
(Romania) M Niculescu	3	7	6
(Latvia) J Ostapenko	6	5	1
Q	(China) S Zhang	2	0^{r}
LL	(United States) C McHale	6	3
(Kazakhstan) Y Putintseva	4	6	5
16	(Russia) A Pavlyuchenkova	6	1	7
10	(United States) M Keys	6	6
(Russia) E Vesnina	4	0
Alt	(United States) M Brengle	6	1	6
(Russia) E Makarova	4	6	4
WC	(France) C Garcia	6	3	3
(Czech Republic) B Strýcová	2	6	6

Second round
4	(Poland) A Radwańska	6	7
(Romania) M Niculescu	1	5
LL	(United States) C McHale	2	5
16	(Russia) A Pavlyuchenkova	6	7
10	(United States) M Keys	6	6
Alt	(United States) M Brengle	4	3
(Czech Republic) B Strýcová	3	0
6	(United States) V Williams	6	6

Third round
4	(Poland) A Radwańska	4	7^{7}	1
16	(Russia) A Pavlyuchenkova	6	6^{4}	6
10	(United States) M Keys	6	6^{2}	6
6	(United States) V Williams	1	7^{7}	3

Quarterfinals
16	(Russia) A Pavlyuchenkova	6^{3}	6	0
10	(United States) M Keys	7^{7}	1	6

=== Bottom half ===
==== Section 3 ====
First round
Q	(Russia) A Kudryavtseva	7^{7}	1	6
(France) K Mladenovic	6^{5}	6	3
(France) A Cornet	6^{1}	3
(Germany) A Petkovic	7^{7}	6
Q	(Poland) M Linette	1	2
12	(Czech Republic) P Kvitová	6	6
14	(Czech Republic) Ka Plíšková	3	6	7
Q	(Ukraine) K Bondarenko	6	2	5
WC	(Canada) A Wozniak	4	6^{4}
(Italy) S Errani	6	7^{7}
(Australia) D Gavrilova	6	6
(Germany) A Beck	4	3

Second round
9	(Russia) S Kuznetsova	7	6
Q	(Russia) A Kudryavtseva	5	0
(Germany) A Petkovic	2	4
12	(Czech Republic) P Kvitová	6	6
14	(Czech Republic) Ka Plíšková	w/o
(Italy) S Errani
(Australia) D Gavrilova	2	3
5	(Romania) S Halep	6	6

Third round
9	(Russia) S Kuznetsova	7^{7}	6
12	(Czech Republic) P Kvitová	6^{2}	3
14	(Czech Republic) Ka Plíšková	3	3
5	(Romania) S Halep	6	6

Quarterfinals
9	(Russia) S Kuznetsova	6	1	1
5	(Romania) S Halep	3	6	6

==== Section 4 ====
First round
(United States) S Stephens	6^{2}	6^{4}
Q	(Italy) C Giorgi	7^{7}	7^{7}
(Japan) M Doi	6	3	1
(Russia) D Kasatkina	3	6	6
(United Kingdom) H Watson	5	3
13	(Australia) S Stosur	7	6
17	(Ukraine) E Svitolina	6	6
Q	(United States) J Brady	2	4
WC	(Canada) F Abanda	6	7
Q	(China) S Zheng	1	5
(Croatia) M Lučić-Baroni	6	6
Q	(Japan) N Hibino	2	0

Second round
7	(Italy) R Vinci	2	6	6
Q	(Italy) C Giorgi	6	3	4
(Russia) D Kasatkina	7^{7}	6
13	(Australia) S Stosur	6^{1}	3
17	(Ukraine) E Svitolina	7^{7}	7^{7}
WC	(Canada) F Abanda	6^{2}	6^{3}
(Croatia) M Lučić-Baroni	3	6	3
2	(Germany) A Kerber	6	4	6

Third round
7	(Italy) R Vinci	5	3
(Russia) D Kasatkina	7	6
17	(Ukraine) E Svitolina	6	6^{2}	4
2	(Germany) A Kerber	1	7^{7}	6

Quarterfinals
(Russia) D Kasatkina	2	2
2	(Germany) A Kerber	6	6

== Qualifying ==
=== Seeds ===
1. (United States) Varvara Lepchenko (qualifying competition, lucky loser)
2. (United States) Madison Brengle (moved to main draw)
3. (Ukraine) Kateryna Bondarenko (qualified)
4. (China) Zhang Shuai (qualified)
5. (United States) Christina McHale (qualifying competition, lucky loser)
6. (United States) Irina Falconi (qualifying competition, retired)
7. (United States) Nicole Gibbs (qualifying competition)
8. (China) Zheng Saisai (qualified)
9. (Japan) Nao Hibino (qualified)
10. (Colombia) Mariana Duque Mariño (qualified)
11. (Italy) Camila Giorgi (qualified)
12. (Germany) Sabine Lisicki (qualifying competition)
13. (United Kingdom) Naomi Broady (qualified)
14. (Japan) Naomi Osaka (first round)
15. (Poland) Magda Linette (qualified)
16. (United States) Samantha Crawford (first round)
17. (United States) Bethanie Mattek-Sands (qualifying competition)
18. (Croatia) Donna Vekić (first round)
19. (United States) Vania King (qualified)
20. (Slovakia) Kristína Kučová (qualified)
21. (Paraguay) Verónica Cepede Royg (qualifying competition)
22. (France) Océane Dodin (first round)
23. (Israel) Julia Glushko (qualifying competition)
24. (United States) Julia Boserup (qualifying competition)
25. (United States) Jennifer Brady (qualified)

=== Qualifiers ===
1. (Russia) Alla Kudryavtseva
2. (United States) Jennifer Brady
3. (Ukraine) Kateryna Bondarenko
4. (China) Zhang Shuai
5. (Slovakia) Kristína Kučová
6. (United States) Vania King
7. (United Kingdom) Naomi Broady
8. (China) Zheng Saisai
9. (Japan) Nao Hibino
10. (Colombia) Mariana Duque Mariño
11. (Italy) Camila Giorgi
12. (Poland) Magda Linette

=== Lucky losers ===
1. (United States) Christina McHale
2. (United States) Varvara Lepchenko

=== Qualifying draw ===
==== First qualifier ====
First round
1	(United States) Varvara Lepchenko	6	6
(Slovenia) Andreja Klepač	1	1
(Russia) Alla Kudryavtseva	3	7^{8}	6
14	(Japan) Naomi Osaka	6	6^{6}	4

Qualifying competition
1	(United States) Varvara Lepchenko	2	2
(Russia) Alla Kudryavtseva	6	6

==== Second qualifier ====
First round
25	(United States) Jennifer Brady	6	6
(Ukraine) Olga Savchuk	0	4
WC	(Canada) Petra Januskova	2	4
24	(United States) Julia Boserup	6	6

Qualifying competition
25	(United States) Jennifer Brady	6	6
24	(United States) Julia Boserup	3	4

==== Third qualifier ====
First round
3	(Ukraine) Kateryna Bondarenko	6	6
(China) Xu Yifan	0	1
WC	(Canada) Bianca Andreescu	7^{7}	7
16	(United States) Samantha Crawford	6^{3}	5

Qualifying competition
3	(Ukraine) Kateryna Bondarenko	6	6
WC	(Canada) Bianca Andreescu	2	1

==== Fourth qualifier ====
First round
4	(China) Zhang Shuai	6	6
WC	(Canada) Charlotte Robillard-Millette	4	3
WC	(Canada) Catherine Leduc	0	1
21	(Paraguay) Verónica Cepede Royg	6	6

Qualifying competition
4	(China) Zhang Shuai	6	7^{7}
21	(Paraguay) Verónica Cepede Royg	0	6^{5}

==== Fifth qualifier ====
First round
5	(United States) Christina McHale	6	6
(Canada) Carol Zhao	2	3
WC	(Canada) Erin Routliffe	1	2
20	(Slovakia) Kristína Kučová	6	6

Qualifying competition
5	(United States) Christina McHale	0	4
20	(Slovakia) Kristína Kučová	6	6

==== Sixth qualifier ====
First round
6	(United States) Irina Falconi	6	6
WC	(Canada) Tiffany Lagarde	3	1
(United States) Danielle Lao	7	1	5
19	(United States) Vania King	5	6	7

Qualifying competition
6	(United States) Irina Falconi	6	0^{r}
19	(United States) Vania King	3	3

==== Seventh qualifier ====
First round
7	(United States) Nicole Gibbs	6	6
(United States) Sachia Vickery	2	4
(United States) Lauren Albanese	6^{7}	5
13	(United Kingdom) Naomi Broady	7^{9}	7

Qualifying competition
7	(United States) Nicole Gibbs	7^{7}	3	3
13	(United Kingdom) Naomi Broady	6^{4}	6	6

==== Eighth qualifier ====
First round
8	(China) Zheng Saisai	6	6
WC	(Canada) Isabelle Boulais	3	1
(United States) Asia Muhammad	6	6
18	(Croatia) Donna Vekić	4	2

Qualifying competition
8	(China) Zheng Saisai	6	6
(United States) Asia Muhammad	2	3

==== Ninth qualifier ====
First round
9	(Japan) Nao Hibino	6	6
(Japan) Eri Hozumi	3	3
WC	(Canada) Maria Patrascu	2	0
23	(Israel) Julia Glushko	6	6

Qualifying competition
9	(Japan) Nao Hibino	6	6
23	(Israel) Julia Glushko	3	3

==== Tenth qualifier ====
First round
10	(Colombia) Mariana Duque Mariño	6	6
WC	(Canada) Marie-Alexandre Leduc	2	2
(Belarus) Olga Govortsova	7	6^{4}	6
22	(France) Océane Dodin	5	7^{7}	4

Qualifying competition
10	(Colombia) Mariana Duque Mariño	4	7^{7}	6
(Belarus) Olga Govortsova	6	6^{2}	1

==== Eleventh qualifier ====
First round
11	(Italy) Camila Giorgi	6	6
WC	(Canada) Gabriela Dabrowski	3	1
(United Kingdom) Tara Moore	6	3	6^{4}
17	(United States) Bethanie Mattek-Sands	4	6	7^{7}

Qualifying competition
11	(Italy) Camila Giorgi	6	6
17	(United States) Bethanie Mattek-Sands	3	1

==== Twelfth qualifier ====
First round			Qualifying competition
12	(Germany) Sabine Lisicki	w/o
	(United States) Jessica Pegula
	(United States) Jessica Pegula		12	(Germany) Sabine Lisicki	5	2
			15	(Poland) Magda Linette	7	6
