= 2017 Italian Open – Women's doubles =

Women's doubles
- 2017 Italian Open

Final
- Champions: (Chinese Taipei) Chan Yung-jan (Switzerland) Martina Hingis
- Runners-up: (Russia) Ekaterina Makarova (Russia) Elena Vesnina
- Score: 7–5, 7–6^{(7–4)}

Details
- Draw: 28
- Seeds: 8

Events
Singles	men	women
Doubles	men	women
← 2016 ·	Italian Open	· 2018 →

Martina Hingis and Sania Mirza were the defending champions, but chose not to participate together. Mirza played alongside Yaroslava Shvedova, but lost in the semifinals to Chan Yung-jan and Hingis.

Chan and Hingis went on to win the title, defeating Ekaterina Makarova and Elena Vesnina in the final, 7–5, 7–6^{(7–4)}.

== Seeds ==
The top four seeds received a bye into the second round.

1. (Russia) Ekaterina Makarova / (Russia) Elena Vesnina (final)
2. (Chinese Taipei) Chan Yung-jan / (Switzerland) Martina Hingis (champions)
3. (India) Sania Mirza / (Kazakhstan) Yaroslava Shvedova (semifinals)
4. (Hungary) Tímea Babos / (Czech Republic) Andrea Hlaváčková (semifinals)
5. (Czech Republic) Karolína Plíšková / (Czech Republic) Barbora Strýcová (first round)
6. (United States) Abigail Spears / (Slovenia) Katarina Srebotnik (quarterfinals)
7. (Canada) Gabriela Dabrowski / (China) Xu Yifan (first round)
8. (Chinese Taipei) Chan Hao-ching / (Latvia) Jeļena Ostapenko (first round)

== Draw ==
Key

- Q = Qualifier
- WC = Wild card
- LL = Lucky loser
- Alt = Alternate
- ITF = ITF entry
- PR = Protected ranking
- SR = Special ranking
- SE = Special exempt
- JE = Junior exempt
- JR = Junior Accelerator Programme entrant
- CO = College Accelerator Programme entrant
- NG = Next Gen Accelerator Program entrant
- w/o = Walkover
- r = Retired
- d = Defaulted

=== Finals ===
Semifinals
1	(Russia) Ekaterina Makarova (Russia) Elena Vesnina	6	6^{4}	[10]
4	(Hungary) Tímea Babos (Czech Republic) Andrea Hlaváčková	3	7^{7}	[8]
3	(India) Sania Mirza (Kazakhstan) Yaroslava Shvedova	3	6^{7}
2	(Chinese Taipei) Chan Yung-jan (Switzerland) Martina Hingis	6	7^{9}

Final
1	(Russia) Ekaterina Makarova (Russia) Elena Vesnina	5	6^{4}
2	(Chinese Taipei) Chan Yung-jan (Switzerland) Martina Hingis	7	7^{7}

=== Top half ===
First round
(Croatia) D Jurak (Australia) An Rodionova	6	3	[12]
(Netherlands) K Bertens (Germany) J Görges	3	6	[10]
(Russia) S Kuznetsova (France) K Mladenovic	6	1	[8]
(Germany) A-L Grönefeld (Czech Republic) K Peschke	2	6	[10]
(Czech Republic) B Krejčíková (China) S Zheng	0	6	[10]
5	(Czech Republic) Ka Plíšková (Czech Republic) B Strýcová	6	4	[8]
(Australia) D Gavrilova (Russia) A Pavlyuchenkova	6	4	[9]
(Spain) L Arruabarrena (Spain) A Parra Santonja	3	6	[11]
WC	(Serbia) J Janković (Germany) A Petkovic	7	6
WC	(Italy) D Chiesa (Italy) S Rubini	5	2
(Ukraine) K Bondarenko (Czech Republic) K Siniaková	7^{8}	6
7	(Canada) G Dabrowski (China) Y Xu	6^{6}	4

Second round
1	(Russia) E Makarova (Russia) E Vesnina	6	6
(Croatia) D Jurak (Australia) An Rodionova	4	4
(Germany) A-L Grönefeld (Czech Republic) K Peschke	2	3
(Czech Republic) B Krejčíková (China) S Zheng	6	6
4	(Hungary) T Babos (Czech Republic) A Hlaváčková	6	7
(Spain) L Arruabarrena (Spain) A Parra Santonja	2	5
WC	(Serbia) J Janković (Germany) A Petkovic	5	5
(Ukraine) K Bondarenko (Czech Republic) K Siniaková	7	7

Quarterfinals
1	(Russia) E Makarova (Russia) E Vesnina	6	6
(Czech Republic) B Krejčíková (China) S Zheng	3	2
4	(Hungary) T Babos (Czech Republic) A Hlaváčková	3	6	[10]
(Ukraine) K Bondarenko (Czech Republic) K Siniaková	6	1	[4]

Semifinals
1	(Russia) E Makarova (Russia) E Vesnina	6	6^{4}	[10]
4	(Hungary) T Babos (Czech Republic) A Hlaváčková	3	7^{7}	[8]

=== Bottom half ===
First round
8	(Chinese Taipei) H-c Chan (Latvia) J Ostapenko	6	2	[6]
(United Kingdom) J Konta (Germany) L Siegemund	4	6	[10]
WC	(Italy) S Errani (Italy) M Trevisan	2	6	[10]
(United States) C McHale (Romania) M Niculescu	6	4	[8]
(Japan) S Aoyama (China) C Liang	4	2
Alt	(Ukraine) O Savchuk (Ukraine) E Svitolina	6	6
6	(United States) A Spears (Slovenia) K Srebotnik	6	6
(Slovenia) A Klepač (Spain) MJ Martínez Sánchez	3	4
(Australia) S Stosur (China) S Zhang	2	4
(Japan) E Hozumi (Japan) M Kato	6	6
(Japan) N Hibino (Poland) A Rosolska	6	4	[10]
(United States) M Keys (United States) B Mattek-Sands	4	6	[5]

Second round
(United Kingdom) J Konta (Germany) L Siegemund	6	6^{5}	[7]
WC	(Italy) S Errani (Italy) M Trevisan	2	7^{7}	[10]
Alt	(Ukraine) O Savchuk (Ukraine) E Svitolina
3	(India) S Mirza (Kazakhstan) Y Shvedova	w/o
6	(United States) A Spears (Slovenia) K Srebotnik	6	7
(Japan) E Hozumi (Japan) M Kato	2	5
(Japan) N Hibino (Poland) A Rosolska	6	5	[9]
2	(Chinese Taipei) Y-j Chan (Switzerland) M Hingis	4	7	[11]

Quarterfinals
WC	(Italy) S Errani (Italy) M Trevisan	4	1
3	(India) S Mirza (Kazakhstan) Y Shvedova	6	6
6	(United States) A Spears (Slovenia) K Srebotnik	2	4
2	(Chinese Taipei) Y-j Chan (Switzerland) M Hingis	6	6

Semifinals
3	(India) S Mirza (Kazakhstan) Y Shvedova	3	6^{7}
2	(Chinese Taipei) Y-j Chan (Switzerland) M Hingis	6	7^{9}
