= 2017 Italian Open – Women's singles =

Women's singles
- 2017 Italian Open

Final
- Champion: (Ukraine) Elina Svitolina
- Runner-up: (Romania) Simona Halep
- Score: 4–6, 7–5, 6–1

Details
- Draw: 56 (8 Q / 3 WC )
- Seeds: 16

Events
| Singles | men | women |
| Doubles | men | women |
| ← 2016 · | Italian Open | · 2018 → |

Elina Svitolina defeated Simona Halep in the final, 4–6, 7–5, 6–1 to win the women's singles tennis title at the 2017 Italian Open.

Serena Williams was the reigning champion, but did not participate this year due to pregnancy.

== Seeds ==
The top eight seeds received a bye into the second round.

1. (Germany) Angelique Kerber (second round)
2. (Czech Republic) Karolína Plíšková (quarterfinals)
3. (Spain) Garbiñe Muguruza (semifinals, retired)
4. (Slovakia) Dominika Cibulková (second round)
5. (United Kingdom) Johanna Konta (third round)
6. (Romania) Simona Halep (final)
7. (Russia) Svetlana Kuznetsova (third round)
8. (Ukraine) Elina Svitolina (champion)
9. (United States) Venus Williams (quarterfinals)
10. (United States) Madison Keys (first round)
11. (Russia) Elena Vesnina (first round)
12. (Russia) Anastasia Pavlyuchenkova (third round)
13. (France) Kristina Mladenovic (first round)
14. (Czech Republic) Barbora Strýcová (second round)
15. (Netherlands) Kiki Bertens (semifinals)
16. (Croatia) Mirjana Lučić-Baroni (third round)

Click on the seed number of a player to go to their draw section.

== Draw ==
=== Key ===
- Q = Qualifier
- WC = Wild card
- LL = Lucky loser
- Alt = Alternate
- ITF = ITF entry
- PR = Protected ranking
- SR = Special ranking
- SE = Special exempt
- JE = Junior exempt
- JR = Junior Accelerator Programme entrant
- CO = College Accelerator Programme entrant
- NG = Next Gen Accelerator Program entrant
- w/o = Walkover
- r = Retired
- d = Defaulted

=== Finals ===
Quarterfinals
Q | (Estonia) Anett Kontaveit | 2 | 4
6 | (Romania) Simona Halep | 6 | 6
15 | (Netherlands) Kiki Bertens | 6 | 6
Q | (Australia) Daria Gavrilova | 3 | 3
9 | (United States) Venus Williams | 2 | 6 | 2
3 | (Spain) Garbiñe Muguruza | 6 | 3 | 6
8 | (Ukraine) Elina Svitolina | 6 | 7^{11}
2 | (Czech Republic) Karolína Plíšková | 2 | 6^{9}

Semifinals
6 | (Romania) Simona Halep | 7 | 6
15 | (Netherlands) Kiki Bertens | 5 | 1
3 | (Spain) Garbiñe Muguruza | 1^{r}
8 | (Ukraine) Elina Svitolina | 4

Final
6 | (Romania) Simona Halep | 6 | 5 | 1
8 | (Ukraine) Elina Svitolina | 4 | 7 | 6

=== Top half ===
==== Section 1 ====
First round
Q | (Germany) A Petkovic | 3 | 4
Q | (Estonia) A Kontaveit | 6 | 6
(United States) C McHale | 4 | 2
WC | (Russia) M Sharapova | 6 | 6
(Czech Republic) L Šafářová | 5 | 6 | 3
16 | (Croatia) M Lučić-Baroni | 7 | 4 | 6
12 | (Russia) A Pavlyuchenkova | 6 | 6^{5} | 6
(Australia) S Stosur | 4 | 7^{7} | 1
(Latvia) A Sevastova | 6 | 6
(Romania) I-C Begu | 4 | 4
(Germany) L Siegemund | 6 | 6
(Japan) N Osaka | 2 | 4

Second round
1 | (Germany) A Kerber | 4 | 0
Q | (Estonia) A Kontaveit | 6 | 6
WC | (Russia) M Sharapova | 4 | 6 | 2^{r}
16 | (Croatia) M Lučić-Baroni | 6 | 3 | 1
12 | (Russia) A Pavlyuchenkova | 7^{7} | 6
(Latvia) A Sevastova | 6^{4} | 2
(Germany) L Siegemund | 4 | 4
6 | (Romania) S Halep | 6 | 6

Third round
Q | (Estonia) A Kontaveit | 6 | 6
16 | (Croatia) M Lučić-Baroni | 1 | 1
12 | (Russia) A Pavlyuchenkova | 1 | 6 | 0
6 | (Romania) S Halep | 6 | 4 | 6

Quarterfinals
Q | (Estonia) A Kontaveit | 2 | 4
6 | (Romania) S Halep | 6 | 6

==== Section 2 ====
First round
(Russia) E Makarova | 6 | 6
(Italy) R Vinci | 2 | 1
(Japan) M Doi | 4 | 6^{6}
Q | (United States) C Bellis | 6 | 7^{8}
(Romania) M Niculescu | 6 | 2 | 1
15 | (Netherlands) K Bertens | 2 | 6 | 6
10 | (United States) M Keys | 6 | 5 | 5
Q | (Australia) D Gavrilova | 2 | 7 | 7
(France) C Garcia | 7^{7} | 3 | 7^{8}
Q | (Croatia) D Vekić | 6^{2} | 6 | 6^{6}
(Czech Republic) K Siniaková | 5 | 6 | 7^{8}
(China) S Zhang | 7 | 3 | 6^{6}

Second round
4 | (Slovakia) D Cibulková | 6 | 1 | 3
(Russia) E Makarova | 1 | 6 | 6
Q | (United States) C Bellis | 4 | 0
15 | (Netherlands) K Bertens | 6 | 6
Q | (Australia) D Gavrilova | 7 | 3 | 6
(France) C Garcia | 5 | 6 | 3
(Czech Republic) K Siniaková | 1 | 6^{3}
7 | (Russia) S Kuznetsova | 6 | 7^{7}

Third round
(Russia) E Makarova | 6^{3} | 1
15 | (Netherlands) K Bertens | 7^{7} | 6
Q | (Australia) D Gavrilova | 2 | 7 | 6
7 | (Russia) S Kuznetsova | 6 | 5 | 4

Quarterfinals
15 | (Netherlands) K Bertens | 6 | 6
Q | (Australia) D Gavrilova | 3 | 3

=== Bottom half ===
==== Section 3 ====
First round
(Kazakhstan) Y Putintseva | 6 | 7
(Puerto Rico) M Puig | 2 | 5
(Ukraine) L Tsurenko | 7 | 6
WC | (Italy) D Chiesa | 5 | 2
(Kazakhstan) Y Shvedova | 4 | 6^{4}
9 | (United States) V Williams | 6 | 7^{7}
13 | (France) K Mladenovic | 6^{6} | 5
(Germany) J Görges | 7^{8} | 7
(Serbia) J Janković | 6 | 6
(United States) A Riske | 3 | 3
Q | (Latvia) J Ostapenko | 6 | 6
(United States) S Rogers | 3 | 4

Second round
5 | (United Kingdom) J Konta | 6 | 6
(Kazakhstan) Y Putintseva | 3 | 0
(Ukraine) L Tsurenko | 4 | 3
9 | (United States) V Williams | 6 | 6
(Germany) J Görges | 2 | 7^{7} | 6
(Serbia) J Janković | 6 | 6^{2} | 1
Q | (Latvia) J Ostapenko | 6 | 2 | 1
3 | (Spain) G Muguruza | 2 | 6 | 6

Third round
5 | (United Kingdom) J Konta | 1 | 6 | 1
9 | (United States) V Williams | 6 | 3 | 6
(Germany) J Görges | 5 | 4
3 | (Spain) G Muguruza | 7 | 6

Quarterfinals
9 | (United States) V Williams | 2 | 6 | 2
3 | (Spain) G Muguruza | 6 | 3 | 6

==== Section 4 ====
First round
(France) A Cornet | 6 | 6
WC | (Italy) S Errani | 3 | 4
(China) S Peng | 1 | 6 | 3
Q | (Germany) M Barthel | 6 | 3 | 6
Q | (China) Q Wang | 6 | 6
11 | (Russia) E Vesnina | 2 | 4
14 | (Czech Republic) B Strýcová | 4 | 4
(Russia) D Kasatkina | 6 | 3^{r}
(Switzerland) T Bacsinszky | 6 | 6
(Hungary) T Babos | 2 | 2
(United States) L Davis | 6 | 5 | 6
(Spain) C Suárez Navarro | 2 | 7 | 3

Second round
8 | (Ukraine) E Svitolina | 6 | 7^{13}
(France) A Cornet | 4 | 6^{11}
Q | (Germany) M Barthel | 6 | 6
Q | (China) Q Wang | 3 | 4
14 | (Czech Republic) B Strýcová | 4 | 2
(Switzerland) T Bacsinszky | 6 | 6
(United States) L Davis | 1 | 1
2 | (Czech Republic) Ka Plíšková | 6 | 6

Third round
8 | (Ukraine) E Svitolina | 3 | 6 | 6
Q | (Germany) M Barthel | 6 | 0 | 0
(Switzerland) T Bacsinszky | 1 | 5
2 | (Czech Republic) Ka Plíšková | 6 | 7

Quarterfinals
8 | (Ukraine) E Svitolina | 6 | 7^{11}
2 | (Czech Republic) Ka Plíšková | 2 | 6^{9}

== Qualifying ==
=== Seeds ===
1. (Australia) Daria Gavrilova (qualified)
2. (Latvia) Jeļena Ostapenko (qualified)
3. (United States) Catherine Bellis (qualified)
4. (Germany) Mona Barthel (qualified)
5. (Spain) Lara Arruabarrena (first round)
6. (France) Océane Dodin (qualifying competition)
7. (China) Wang Qiang (qualified)
8. (Estonia) Anett Kontaveit (qualified)
9. (United States) Varvara Lepchenko (qualifying competition)
10. (China) Zheng Saisai (first round)
11. (Russia) Natalia Vikhlyantseva (first round)
12. (Japan) Risa Ozaki (qualifying competition)
13. (Bulgaria) Tsvetana Pironkova (first round)
14. (Germany) Andrea Petkovic (qualified)
15. (Spain) Sara Sorribes Tormo (qualifying competition)
16. (Japan) Nao Hibino (qualifying competition)

=== Qualifiers ===
1. (Australia) Daria Gavrilova
2. (Latvia) Jeļena Ostapenko
3. (United States) Catherine Bellis
4. (Germany) Mona Barthel
5. (Croatia) Donna Vekić
6. (Germany) Andrea Petkovic
7. (China) Wang Qiang
8. (Estonia) Anett Kontaveit

=== Draw ===
==== First qualifier ====
First round
1 | (Australia) Daria Gavrilova | 6 | 4 | 6
(Belarus) Aliaksandra Sasnovich | 2 | 6 | 2
(United States) Bethanie Mattek-Sands | 7^{8} | 6
13 | (Bulgaria) Tsvetana Pironkova | 6^{6} | 4

Qualifying competition
1 | (Australia) Daria Gavrilova | 6 | 6
(United States) Bethanie Mattek-Sands | 2 | 4

==== Second qualifier ====
First round
2 | (Latvia) Jeļena Ostapenko | 6 | 6^{5} | 6
WC | (Italy) Alberta Brianti | 2 | 7^{7} | 2
(Australia) Ashleigh Barty | 2 | 6 | 6
10 | (China) Zheng Saisai | 6 | 1 | 1

Qualifying competition
2 | (Latvia) Jeļena Ostapenko | 5 | 6 | 6
(Australia) Ashleigh Barty | 7 | 4 | 4

==== Third qualifier ====
First round
3 | (United States) Catherine Bellis | 6 | 6
WC | (Italy) Martina Trevisan | 3 | 2
(Bulgaria) Isabella Shinikova | 6 | 4 | 4
15 | (Spain) Sara Sorribes Tormo | 3 | 6 | 6

Qualifying competition
3 | (United States) Catherine Bellis | 6 | 6
15 | (Spain) Sara Sorribes Tormo | 3 | 1

==== Fourth qualifier ====
First round
4 | (Germany) Mona Barthel | 6 | 6
(Greece) Maria Sakkari | 2 | 0
(Ukraine) Kateryna Bondarenko | 0 | 2
9 | (United States) Varvara Lepchenko | 6 | 6

Qualifying competition
4 | (Germany) Mona Barthel | 7 | 7^{7}
9 | (United States) Varvara Lepchenko | 5 | 6^{4}

==== Fifth qualifier ====
First round
5 | (Spain) Lara Arruabarrena | 2 | 4
(Croatia) Donna Vekić | 6 | 6
(United States) Jennifer Brady | 6^{2} | 3
16 | (Japan) Nao Hibino | 7^{7} | 6

Qualifying competition
(Croatia) Donna Vekić | 6 | 6
16 | (Japan) Nao Hibino | 3 | 3

==== Sixth qualifier ====
First round
6 | (France) Océane Dodin | 3 | 6 | 6
WC | (Italy) Cristiana Ferrando | 6 | 1 | 3
(United States) Julia Boserup | 7 | 4 | 1
14 | (Germany) Andrea Petkovic | 5 | 6 | 6

Qualifying competition
6 | (France) Océane Dodin | 6 | 6^{6} | 2
14 | (Germany) Andrea Petkovic | 3 | 7^{8} | 6

==== Seventh qualifier ====
First round
7 | (China) Wang Qiang | 6 | 6
(Romania) Sorana Cîrstea | 4 | 2
WC | (Italy) Federica Di Sarra | 6 | 3 | 3
12 | (Japan) Risa Ozaki | 4 | 6 | 6

Qualifying competition
7 | (China) Wang Qiang | 6 | 6
12 | (Japan) Risa Ozaki | 2 | 0

==== Eighth qualifier ====
First round
8 | (Estonia) Anett Kontaveit | 6 | 4 | 6
(Slovakia) Jana Čepelová | 2 | 6 | 1
(Colombia) Mariana Duque Mariño | 7^{7} | 7
11 | (Russia) Natalia Vikhlyantseva | 6^{4} | 5

Qualifying competition
8 | (Estonia) Anett Kontaveit | 3 | 6 | 7
(Colombia) Mariana Duque Mariño | 6 | 2 | 5
