= 2016 Italian Open – Women's singles =

Women's singles
- 2016 Italian Open

Final
- Champion: (United States) Serena Williams
- Runner-up: (United States) Madison Keys
- Score: 7–6^{(7–5)}, 6–3

Details
- Draw: 56 (8 Q / 3 WC )
- Seeds: 16

Events
Singles	men	women
Doubles	men	women
← 2015 ·	Italian Open	· 2017 →

Serena Williams defeated Madison Keys in the final, 7–6^{(7–5)}, 6–3 to win the women's singles tennis title at the 2016 Italian Open. This was Williams's second title in Rome won without dropping a set, and her fourth Italian Open title overall.

Maria Sharapova was the reigning champion, but could not defend her title because of her provisional suspension after failing a drug test at the Australian Open.

== Seeds ==
The top eight seeds received a bye into the second round.

1. (United States) Serena Williams (champion)
2. (Germany) Angelique Kerber (second round)
3. (Spain) Garbiñe Muguruza (semifinals)
4. (Belarus) Victoria Azarenka (second round)
5. (Czech Republic) Petra Kvitová (second round)
6. (Romania) Simona Halep (second round)
7. (Italy) Roberta Vinci (second round)
8. (Spain) Carla Suárez Navarro (third round)
9. (Russia) Svetlana Kuznetsova (quarterfinals)
10. (Czech Republic) Lucie Šafářová (second round)
11. (Switzerland) Timea Bacsinszky (quarterfinals)
12. (United States) Venus Williams (second round)
13. (Serbia) Ana Ivanovic (second round)
14. (Italy) Sara Errani (first round)
15. (Ukraine) Elina Svitolina (first round)
16. (Czech Republic) Karolína Plíšková (first round)

Click on the seed number of a player to go to their draw section.

== Draw ==
=== Key ===
- Q = Qualifier
- WC = Wild card
- LL = Lucky loser
- Alt = Alternate
- ITF = ITF entry
- PR = Protected ranking
- SR = Special ranking
- SE = Special exempt
- JE = Junior exempt
- JR = Junior Accelerator Programme entrant
- CO = College Accelerator Programme entrant
- NG = Next Gen Accelerator Program entrant
- w/o = Walkover
- r = Retired
- d = Defaulted

=== Finals ===
Quarterfinals
1	(United States) Serena Williams	6	6
9	(Russia) Svetlana Kuznetsova	2	0
(Romania) Irina-Camelia Begu	6	7^{7}
(Japan) Misaki Doi	2	6^{3}
11	(Switzerland) Timea Bacsinszky	5	2
3	(Spain) Garbiñe Muguruza	7	6
(United States) Madison Keys	6	4	6
(Czech Republic) Barbora Strýcová	4	6	3

Semifinals
1	(United States) Serena Williams	6	6
(Romania) Irina-Camelia Begu	4	1
3	(Spain) Garbiñe Muguruza	6^{5}	4
(United States) Madison Keys	7^{7}	6

Final
1	(United States) Serena Williams	7^{7}	6
(United States) Madison Keys	6^{5}	3

=== Top half ===
==== Section 1 ====
First round
(Germany) A-L Friedsam	6	7
(Slovakia) AK Schmiedlová	4	5
WC	(Italy) C Giovine	1	6	2
Q	(United States) C McHale	6	2	6
(Russia) A Pavlyuchenkova	4	4
13	(Serbia) A Ivanovic	6	6
9	(Russia) S Kuznetsova	7	6
(France) C Garcia	5	4
Q	(United States) A Riske	6	6^{5}	1
(Australia) S Stosur	4	7^{7}	6
(Germany) S Lisicki	1	6^{3}
(Australia) D Gavrilova	6	7^{7}

Second round
1	(United States) S Williams	6	6
(Germany) A-L Friedsam	4	3
Q	(United States) C McHale	6^{3}	6	6
13	(Serbia) A Ivanovic	7^{7}	4	1
9	(Russia) S Kuznetsova	6	6
(Australia) S Stosur	4	4
(Australia) D Gavrilova	6	4	6
6	(Romania) S Halep	3	6	3

Third round
1	(United States) S Williams	7^{9}	6
Q	(United States) C McHale	6^{7}	1
9	(Russia) S Kuznetsova	6	2	6
(Australia) D Gavrilova	2	6	3

Quarterfinals
1	(United States) S Williams	6	6
9	(Russia) S Kuznetsova	2	0

==== Section 2 ====
First round
(Russia) M Gasparyan	3	0
(Romania) I-C Begu	6	6
(Romania) M Niculescu	4	1
Q	(Colombia) M Duque Mariño	6	6
(Russia) D Kasatkina	6	6
16	(Czech Republic) Ka Plíšková	4	4
10	(Czech Republic) L Šafářová	6	6
WC	(Italy) F Schiavone	3	2
(France) A Cornet	6^{2}	1
(Japan) M Doi	7^{7}	6
Q	(Sweden) J Larsson	1	2
(United Kingdom) J Konta	6	6

Second round
4	(Belarus) V Azarenka	3	2
(Romania) I-C Begu	6	6
Q	(Colombia) M Duque Mariño	2	2
(Russia) D Kasatkina	6	6
10	(Czech Republic) L Šafářová	3	5
(Japan) M Doi	6	7
(United Kingdom) J Konta	6	6
7	(Italy) R Vinci	0	4

Third round
(Romania) I-C Begu	6	6
(Russia) D Kasatkina	1	4
(Japan) M Doi	4	7	6
(United Kingdom) J Konta	6	5	2

Quarterfinals
(Romania) I-C Begu	6	7^{7}
(Japan) M Doi	2	6^{3}

=== Bottom half ===
==== Section 3 ====
First round
(Brazil) T Pereira	6	7^{8}
(Germany) A Beck	4	6^{6}
Q	(Germany) J Görges	6	6^{5}	3
(Ukraine) L Tsurenko	1	7^{7}	6
(Belgium) Y Wickmayer	2	2
11	(Switzerland) T Bacsinszky	6	6
15	(Ukraine) E Svitolina	1	6	1
Q	(Puerto Rico) M Puig	6	4	6
(France) K Mladenovic	3	1
(Latvia) J Ostapenko	6	6
(Russia) E Makarova	6	6
(Montenegro) D Kovinić	2	2

Second round
8	(Spain) C Suárez Navarro	6	7
(Brazil) T Pereira	1	5
(Ukraine) L Tsurenko	2	4
11	(Switzerland) T Bacsinszky	6	6
Q	(Puerto Rico) M Puig	1	1
(Latvia) J Ostapenko	6	6
(Russia) E Makarova	1	0
3	(Spain) G Muguruza	6	6

Third round
8	(Spain) C Suárez Navarro	7	5	2
11	(Switzerland) T Bacsinszky	5	7	6
(Latvia) J Ostapenko	1	4
3	(Spain) G Muguruza	6	6

Quarterfinals
11	(Switzerland) T Bacsinszky	5	2
3	(Spain) G Muguruza	7	6

==== Section 4 ====
First round
(United States) M Keys	6	6
(Germany) A Petkovic	4	1
Q	(Netherlands) K Bertens	1	4
(Hungary) T Babos	6	6
(United States) C Vandeweghe	4	3
12	(United States) V Williams	6	6
14	(Italy) S Errani	4	6	0
Q	(United Kingdom) H Watson	6	3	6
(Czech Republic) B Strýcová	6	6
WC	(Italy) K Knapp	2	2
(Serbia) J Janković	4	6	3
(Canada) E Bouchard	6	2	6

Second round
5	(Czech Republic) P Kvitová	3	4
(United States) M Keys	6	6
(Hungary) T Babos	6^{5}	7	6
12	(United States) V Williams	7^{7}	5	4
Q	(United Kingdom) H Watson	4	2
(Czech Republic) B Strýcová	6	6
(Canada) E Bouchard	6	5	7
2	(Germany) A Kerber	1	7	5

Third round
(United States) M Keys	7^{7}	6
(Hungary) T Babos	6^{2}	3
(Czech Republic) B Strýcová	6	6
(Canada) E Bouchard	1	0

Quarterfinals
(United States) M Keys	6	4	6
(Czech Republic) B Strýcová	4	6	3

== Qualifying ==
=== Seeds ===
1. (Kazakhstan) Yulia Putintseva (first round)
2. (Russia) Elena Vesnina (qualifying competition)
3. (United Kingdom) Heather Watson (qualified)
4. (Germany) Julia Görges (qualified)
5. (United States) Christina McHale (qualified)
6. (Puerto Rico) Monica Puig (qualified)
7. (Sweden) Johanna Larsson (qualified)
8. (United States) Varvara Lepchenko (qualifying competition)
9. (United States) Irina Falconi (first round)
10. (United States) Madison Brengle (first round)
11. (China) Zheng Saisai (first round)
12. (United States) Nicole Gibbs (first round)
13. (Croatia) Mirjana Lučić-Baroni (first round)
14. (Chinese Taipei) Hsieh Su-wei (qualifying competition)
15. (Spain) Lara Arruabarrena (qualifying competition)
16. (Croatia) Ana Konjuh (qualifying competition)

=== Qualifiers ===
1. (Colombia) Mariana Duque Mariño
2. (United States) Alison Riske
3. (United Kingdom) Heather Watson
4. (Germany) Julia Görges
5. (United States) Christina McHale
6. (Puerto Rico) Monica Puig
7. (Sweden) Johanna Larsson
8. (Netherlands) Kiki Bertens

=== Draw ===
==== First qualifier ====
First round
1	(Kazakhstan) Yulia Putintseva	6^{3}	7^{7}	1
(Colombia) Mariana Duque Mariño	7^{7}	6^{4}	6
(Belarus) Aliaksandra Sasnovich	6	7^{8}
9	(United States) Irina Falconi	4	6^{6}

Qualifying competition
(Colombia) Mariana Duque Mariño	6	4	7^{7}
(Belarus) Aliaksandra Sasnovich	0	6	6^{5}

==== Second qualifier ====
First round
2	(Russia) Elena Vesnina	1	6	6
(Germany) Tatjana Maria	6	4	0
(United States) Alison Riske	6	6
13	(Croatia) Mirjana Lučić-Baroni	2	1

Qualifying competition
2	(Russia) Elena Vesnina	4	4
(United States) Alison Riske	6	6

==== Third qualifier ====
First round
3	(United Kingdom) Heather Watson	6	2	6
WC	(Italy) Nastassja Burnett	3	6	3
(Kazakhstan) Yaroslava Shvedova	1	7^{7}	3
16	(Croatia) Ana Konjuh	6	6^{3}	6

Qualifying competition
3	(United Kingdom) Heather Watson	7	4	6
16	(Croatia) Ana Konjuh	5	6	3

==== Fourth qualifier ====
First round
4	(Germany) Julia Görges	6	6
(Slovenia) Polona Hercog	4	3
(United States) Bethanie Mattek-Sands	6	6
10	(United States) Madison Brengle	4	1

Qualifying competition
4	(Germany) Julia Görges	7	6
(United States) Bethanie Mattek-Sands	5	3

==== Fifth qualifier ====
First round
5	(United States) Christina McHale	6	6
PR	(United Kingdom) Laura Robson	4	2
(United Kingdom) Naomi Broady	6	6
11	(China) Zheng Saisai	3	2

Qualifying competition
5	(United States) Christina McHale	6	3	6
(United Kingdom) Naomi Broady	4	6	1

==== Sixth qualifier ====
First round
6	(Puerto Rico) Monica Puig	6	6
WC	(Italy) Martina Colmegna	3	0
WC	(Italy) Martina Di Giuseppe	2	4
15	(Spain) Lara Arruabarrena	6	6

Qualifying competition
6	(Puerto Rico) Monica Puig	6	6
15	(Spain) Lara Arruabarrena	4	3

==== Seventh qualifier ====
First round
7	(Sweden) Johanna Larsson	7	6
(Croatia) Donna Vekić	5	2
WC	(Italy) Alberta Brianti	6	1	4
14	(Chinese Taipei) Hsieh Su-wei	2	6	6

Qualifying competition
7	(Sweden) Johanna Larsson	6	6
14	(Chinese Taipei) Hsieh Su-wei	3	4

==== Eighth qualifier ====
First round
8	(United States) Varvara Lepchenko	6	6
(Bulgaria) Tsvetana Pironkova	3	0
(Netherlands) Kiki Bertens	6	6
12	(United States) Nicole Gibbs	2	4

Qualifying competition
8	(United States) Varvara Lepchenko	2	3
(Netherlands) Kiki Bertens	6	6
