= 2016 Italian Open – Women's doubles =

Women's doubles
- 2016 Italian Open

Final
- Champions: (Switzerland) Martina Hingis (India) Sania Mirza
- Runners-up: (Russia) Ekaterina Makarova (Russia) Elena Vesnina
- Score: 6–1, 6–7^{(5–7)}, [10–3]

Details
- Draw: 28
- Seeds: 8

Events
| Singles | men | women |
| Doubles | men | women |
| ← 2015 · | Italian Open | · 2017 → |

Tímea Babos and Kristina Mladenovic were the defending champions, but chose not to participate together. Babos played alongside Yaroslava Shvedova, but lost in the quarterfinals to Irina-Camelia Begu and Monica Niculescu. Mladenovic teamed up with Caroline Garcia, but lost in the quarterfinals to Andrea Hlaváčková and Lucie Hradecká.

Martina Hingis and Sania Mirza won the title, defeating Ekaterina Makarova and Elena Vesnina in the final, 6–1, 6–7^{(5–7)}, [10–3].

== Seeds ==
The top four seeds received a bye into the second round.

1. (Switzerland) Martina Hingis / (India) Sania Mirza (champions)
2. (United States) Bethanie Mattek-Sands / (Czech Republic) Lucie Šafářová (second round)
3. (Hungary) Tímea Babos / (Kazakhstan) Yaroslava Shvedova (quarterfinals)
4. (Czech Republic) Andrea Hlaváčková / (Czech Republic) Lucie Hradecká (semifinals)
5. (France) Caroline Garcia / (France) Kristina Mladenovic (quarterfinals)
6. (Chinese Taipei) Chan Yung-jan / (Germany) Anna-Lena Grönefeld (second round)
7. (Russia) Ekaterina Makarova / (Russia) Elena Vesnina (final)
8. (Germany) Julia Görges / (Czech Republic) Karolína Plíšková (second round)

== Draw ==
Key

- Q = Qualifier
- WC = Wild card
- LL = Lucky loser
- Alt = Alternate
- ITF = ITF entry
- PR = Protected ranking
- SR = Special ranking
- SE = Special exempt
- JE = Junior exempt
- JR = Junior Accelerator Programme entrant
- CO = College Accelerator Programme entrant
- NG = Next Gen Accelerator Program entrant
- w/o = Walkover
- r = Retired
- d = Defaulted

=== Finals ===
Semifinals
1 | (Switzerland) Martina Hingis (India) Sania Mirza | 6 | 6
(Romania) Irina-Camelia Begu (Romania) Monica Niculescu | 3 | 4
4 | (Czech Republic) Andrea Hlaváčková (Czech Republic) Lucie Hradecká | 2 | 5
7 | (Russia) Ekaterina Makarova (Russia) Elena Vesnina | 6 | 7

Final
1 | (Switzerland) Martina Hingis (India) Sania Mirza | 6 | 6^{5} | [10]
7 | (Russia) Ekaterina Makarova (Russia) Elena Vesnina | 1 | 7^{7} | [3]

=== Top half ===
First round
(Chinese Taipei) S-w Hsieh (Georgia (country)) O Kalashnikova | 6 | 6^{5} | [10]
(Argentina) M Irigoyen (Poland) A Rosolska | 2 | 7^{7} | [6]
(United States) R Atawo (United States) A Spears | 6 | 6
(China) C Liang (China) Y Wang | 2 | 3
WC | (Italy) K Knapp (Italy) F Schiavone | 2 | 1
8 | (Germany) J Görges (Czech Republic) Ka Plíšková | 6 | 6
(China) Y Xu (China) S Zheng | 6 | 3 | [5]
WC | (Italy) C Giovine (Italy) A Moratelli | 0 | 6 | [10]
WC | (Russia) S Kuznetsova (Russia) A Pavlyuchenkova | 6 | 3 | [7]
(Romania) I-C Begu (Romania) M Niculescu | 4 | 6 | [10]
(Chinese Taipei) C-j Chuang (Croatia) D Jurak | 2 | 1
6 | (Chinese Taipei) Y-j Chan (Germany) A-L Grönefeld | 6 | 6

Second round
1 | (Switzerland) M Hingis (India) S Mirza | 6 | 6
(Chinese Taipei) S-w Hsieh (Georgia (country)) O Kalashnikova | 3 | 3
(United States) R Atawo (United States) A Spears | 6 | 6
8 | (Germany) J Görges (Czech Republic) Ka Plíšková | 4 | 3
3 | (Hungary) T Babos (Kazakhstan) Y Shvedova | 6 | 6
WC | (Italy) C Giovine (Italy) A Moratelli | 3 | 2
(Romania) I-C Begu (Romania) M Niculescu | 2 | 7^{7} | [10]
6 | (Chinese Taipei) Y-j Chan (Germany) A-L Grönefeld | 6 | 6^{1} | [8]

Quarterfinals
1 | (Switzerland) M Hingis (India) S Mirza | 6 | 6
(United States) R Atawo (United States) A Spears | 4 | 2
3 | (Hungary) T Babos (Kazakhstan) Y Shvedova | 6^{4} | 3
(Romania) I-C Begu (Romania) M Niculescu | 7^{7} | 6

Semifinals
1 | (Switzerland) M Hingis (India) S Mirza | 6 | 6
(Romania) I-C Begu (Romania) M Niculescu | 3 | 4

=== Bottom half ===
First round
5 | (France) C Garcia (France) K Mladenovic | 6 | 0 | [11]
(Netherlands) M Krajicek (Czech Republic) B Strýcová | 1 | 6 | [9]
(Poland) K Jans-Ignacik (Germany) T Maria | 6^{1} | 1
(Spain) A Medina Garrigues (Spain) A Parra Santonja | 7^{7} | 6
(Spain) L Arruabarrena (Italy) S Errani | 6 | 4 | [10]
(United States) V King (Russia) A Kudryavtseva | 2 | 6 | [5]
7 | (Russia) E Makarova (Russia) E Vesnina | 6 | 6
(Ukraine) L Kichenok (Ukraine) O Savchuk | 4 | 3
(Canada) G Dabrowski (Australia) An Rodionova | 3 | 2
(Netherlands) K Bertens (Sweden) J Larsson | 6 | 6
WC | (United States) S Williams (United States) V Williams | 1 | 5
(Slovenia) A Klepač (Slovenia) K Srebotnik | 6 | 7

Second round
5 | (France) C Garcia (France) K Mladenovic | 7^{7} | 1 | [10]
(Spain) A Medina Garrigues (Spain) A Parra Santonja | 6^{4} | 6 | [7]
(Spain) L Arruabarrena (Italy) S Errani | 4 | 1
4 | (Czech Republic) A Hlaváčková (Czech Republic) L Hradecká | 6 | 6
7 | (Russia) E Makarova (Russia) E Vesnina | 7^{7} | 6^{5} | [12]
(Netherlands) K Bertens (Sweden) J Larsson | 6^{5} | 7^{7} | [10]
(Slovenia) A Klepač (Slovenia) K Srebotnik | 6 | 6
2 | (United States) B Mattek-Sands (Czech Republic) L Šafářová | 3 | 4

Quarterfinals
5 | (France) C Garcia (France) K Mladenovic | 4 | 4
4 | (Czech Republic) A Hlaváčková (Czech Republic) L Hradecká | 6 | 6
7 | (Russia) E Makarova (Russia) E Vesnina | 6 | 6
(Slovenia) A Klepač (Slovenia) K Srebotnik | 2 | 4

Semifinals
4 | (Czech Republic) A Hlaváčková (Czech Republic) L Hradecká | 2 | 5
7 | (Russia) E Makarova (Russia) E Vesnina | 6 | 7
