= 2015 WTA Premier Mandatory and Premier 5 tournaments =

Women's professional tennis tour

2015 Premier Mandatory / Premier 5
Details
- Duration: February 16 – October 11
- Edition: 26th
- Tournaments: 9

Achievements (singles)
- Most titles: (Romania) Simona Halep (United States) Serena Williams (2)
- Most finals: (Romania) Simona Halep (4)

The WTA Premier Mandatory and Premier 5 tournaments, which are part of the WTA Premier tournaments, make up the elite tour for professional women's tennis organised by the WTA called the WTA Tour. There are four Premier Mandatory tournaments: Indian Wells, Miami, Madrid and Beijing and five Premier 5 tournaments: Dubai, Rome, Canada, Cincinnati and Wuhan.

== Tournaments ==
Tournament	Country	Location	Surface	Date	Prize money
Dubai Tennis Championships	United Arab Emirates	Dubai	Hard	Feb 16 – 22	$2,513,000
Indian Wells Open	United States	Indian Wells	Hard	Mar 9 – 22	$6,157,160
Miami Open	United States	Key Biscayne	Hard	Mar 23 – Apr 5	$6,157,160
Madrid Open	Spain	Madrid	Clay (red)	May 4 – 10	€4,185,405
Italian Open	Italy	Rome	Clay (red)	May 11 – 17	$2,183,600
Canadian Open	Canada	Toronto	Hard	Aug 10 – 16	$2,513,000
Cincinnati Open	United States	Mason	Hard	Aug 17 – 23	$2,701,240
Wuhan Open	China	Wuhan	Hard	Sep 28 – Oct 4	$2,513,000
China Open	China	Beijing	Hard	Oct 5 – 11	$6,157,160

== Results ==
* First-time champion

Tournament	Singles champions	Runners-up	Score	Doubles champions	Runners-up	Score
Dubai Singles – Doubles	(Romania) Simona Halep	(Czech Republic) Karolína Plíšková	6–4, 7–6^{(7–4)}	(Hungary) Tímea Babos*	(Spain) Garbiñe Muguruza (Spain) Carla Suárez Navarro	6–3, 6–2
Dubai Singles – Doubles	(Romania) Simona Halep	(Czech Republic) Karolína Plíšková	6–4, 7–6^{(7–4)}	(France) Kristina Mladenovic	(Spain) Garbiñe Muguruza (Spain) Carla Suárez Navarro	6–3, 6–2
Indian Wells Singles – Doubles	(Romania) Simona Halep (2)	(Serbia) Jelena Janković	2–6, 7–5, 6–4	(Switzerland) Martina Hingis (India) Sania Mirza	(Russia) Ekaterina Makarova (Russia) Elena Vesnina	6–3, 6–4
Miami Singles – Doubles	(United States) Serena Williams	(Spain) Carla Suárez Navarro	6–2, 6–0	(Switzerland) Martina Hingis (2) (India) Sania Mirza (2)	(Russia) Ekaterina Makarova (Russia) Elena Vesnina	7–5, 6–1
Madrid Singles – Doubles	(Czech Republic) Petra Kvitová	(Russia) Svetlana Kuznetsova	6–1, 6–2	(Australia) Casey Dellacqua*	(Spain) Garbiñe Muguruza (Spain) Carla Suárez Navarro	6–3, 6–7^{(4–7)}, [10–5]
Madrid Singles – Doubles	(Czech Republic) Petra Kvitová	(Russia) Svetlana Kuznetsova	6–1, 6–2	(Kazakhstan) Yaroslava Shvedova	(Spain) Garbiñe Muguruza (Spain) Carla Suárez Navarro	6–3, 6–7^{(4–7)}, [10–5]
Rome Singles – Doubles	(Russia) Maria Sharapova	(Spain) Carla Suárez Navarro	7–6, 7–5, 6–1	(Hungary) Tímea Babos (2) (France) Kristina Mladenovic (2)	(Switzerland) Martina Hingis (India) Sania Mirza	6–4, 6–3
Toronto Singles – Doubles	(Switzerland) Belinda Bencic*	(Romania) Simona Halep	7–6^{(7–5)}, 6–7^{(4–7)}, 3–0, ret.	(United States) Bethanie Mattek-Sands*	(France) Caroline Garcia (Slovenia) Katarina Srebotnik	6–1, 6–2
Toronto Singles – Doubles	(Switzerland) Belinda Bencic*	(Romania) Simona Halep	7–6^{(7–5)}, 6–7^{(4–7)}, 3–0, ret.	(Czech Republic) Lucie Šafářová	(France) Caroline Garcia (Slovenia) Katarina Srebotnik	6–1, 6–2
Cincinnati Singles – Doubles	(United States) Serena Williams (2)	(Romania) Simona Halep	6–3, 7–6^{(7–5)}	(Chinese Taipei) Chan Hao-ching*	(Australia) Casey Dellacqua (Kazakhstan) Yaroslava Shvedova	7–5, 6–4
Cincinnati Singles – Doubles	(United States) Serena Williams (2)	(Romania) Simona Halep	6–3, 7–6^{(7–5)}	(Chinese Taipei) Chan Latisha	(Australia) Casey Dellacqua (Kazakhstan) Yaroslava Shvedova	7–5, 6–4
Wuhan Singles – Doubles	(United States) Venus Williams	(Spain) Garbiñe Muguruza	6–3, 3–0, ret.	(Switzerland) Martina Hingis (3) (India) Sania Mirza (3)	(Romania) Irina-Camelia Begu (Romania) Monica Niculescu	6–2, 6–3
Beijing Singles – Doubles	(Spain) Garbiñe Muguruza*	(Switzerland) Timea Bacsinszky	7–5, 6–4	(Switzerland) Martina Hingis (4) (India) Sania Mirza (4)	(Chinese Taipei) Chan Hao-ching (Chinese Taipei) Chan Latisha	6–7^{(9–11)}, 6–1, [10–8]

== See also ==
- WTA Premier tournaments
- 2015 WTA Tour
- 2015 ATP Masters 1000
- 2015 ATP Tour
