= 2015 ATP World Tour Masters 1000 =

Men's professional tennis tour

2015 ATP Masters 1000
Details
- Duration: March 12 – November 8
- Edition: 26th
- Tournaments: 9

Achievements (singles)
- Most titles: (Serbia) Novak Djokovic (6)
- Most finals: (Serbia) Novak Djokovic (8)

The twenty-sixth edition of the ATP Masters Series. The champion of each Masters event is awarded 1,000 rankings points. Novak Djokovic won a record 6 titles in a season and reached a record 8 finals in a season.

== Tournaments ==
Tournament	Country	Location	Surface	Prize money
Indian Wells Masters	USA	Indian Wells, California	Hard	$7,107,445
Miami Open	USA	Key Biscayne, Florida	Hard	$6,267,755
Monte-Carlo Masters	FRA	Roquebrune-Cap-Martin	Clay	€3,624,045
Madrid Open	ESP	Madrid	Clay	€5,113,730
Italian Open	ITA	Rome	Clay	€3,830,295
Canadian Open	CAN	Montreal	Hard	$4,178,500
Cincinnati Masters	USA	Mason, Ohio	Hard	$4,457,065
Shanghai Masters	CHN	Shanghai	Hard	$7,021,335
Paris Masters	FRA	Paris	Hard (indoor)	€3,830,295

== Results ==
* First-time champion

Masters	Singles champions	Runners-up	Score	Doubles champions	Runners-up	Score
Indian Wells Singles – Doubles	(Serbia) Novak Djokovic	(Switzerland) Roger Federer	6–3, 6–7^{(5–7)}, 6–2	(Canada) Vasek Pospisil* (United States) Jack Sock*	(Italy) Simone Bolelli (Italy) Fabio Fognini	6–4, 6–7^{(3–7)}, [10–7]
Miami Singles – Doubles	(Serbia) Novak Djokovic	(United Kingdom) Andy Murray	7–6^{(7–3)}, 4–6, 6–0	(United States) Bob Bryan (United States) Mike Bryan	(Canada) Vasek Pospisil (United States) Jack Sock	6–3, 1–6, [10–8]
Monte Carlo Singles – Doubles	(Serbia) Novak Djokovic	(Czech Republic) Tomáš Berdych	7–5, 4–6, 6–3	(United States) Bob Bryan (United States) Mike Bryan	(Italy) Simone Bolelli (Italy) Fabio Fognini	7–6^{(7–3)}, 6–1
Madrid Singles – Doubles	(United Kingdom) Andy Murray	(Spain) Rafael Nadal	6–3, 6–2	(India) Rohan Bopanna	(Poland) Marcin Matkowski (Serbia) Nenad Zimonjić	6–2, 6–7^{(5–7)}, [11–9]
Madrid Singles – Doubles	(United Kingdom) Andy Murray	(Spain) Rafael Nadal	6–3, 6–2	(Romania) Florin Mergea*	(Poland) Marcin Matkowski (Serbia) Nenad Zimonjić	6–2, 6–7^{(5–7)}, [11–9]
Rome Singles – Doubles	(Serbia) Novak Djokovic	(Switzerland) Roger Federer	6–4, 6–3	(Uruguay) Pablo Cuevas* (Spain) David Marrero*	(Spain) Marcel Granollers (Spain) Marc López	6–4, 7–5
Montreal Singles – Doubles	(United Kingdom) Andy Murray	(Serbia) Novak Djokovic	6–4, 4–6, 6–3	(United States) Bob Bryan (United States) Mike Bryan	(Canada) Daniel Nestor (France) Edouard Roger-Vasselin	7–6^{(7–5)}, 3–6, [10–6]
Cincinnati Singles – Doubles	(Switzerland) Roger Federer	(Serbia) Novak Djokovic	7–6^{(7–1)}, 6–3	(Canada) Daniel Nestor	(Poland) Marcin Matkowski (Serbia) Nenad Zimonjić	6–2, 6–2
Cincinnati Singles – Doubles	(Switzerland) Roger Federer	(Serbia) Novak Djokovic	7–6^{(7–1)}, 6–3	(France) Edouard Roger-Vasselin*	(Poland) Marcin Matkowski (Serbia) Nenad Zimonjić	6–2, 6–2
Shanghai Singles – Doubles	(Serbia) Novak Djokovic	(France) Jo-Wilfried Tsonga	6–2, 6–4	(South Africa) Raven Klaasen*	(Italy) Simone Bolelli (Italy) Fabio Fognini	6–3, 6–3
Shanghai Singles – Doubles	(Serbia) Novak Djokovic	(France) Jo-Wilfried Tsonga	6–2, 6–4	(Brazil) Marcelo Melo	(Italy) Simone Bolelli (Italy) Fabio Fognini	6–3, 6–3
Paris Singles – Doubles	(Serbia) Novak Djokovic	(United Kingdom) Andy Murray	6–2, 6–4	(Croatia) Ivan Dodig (Brazil) Marcelo Melo	(Canada) Vasek Pospisil (United States) Jack Sock	2–6, 6–3, [10–5]

== Tournament details ==
Key

- Q = Qualifier
- WC = Wild card
- LL = Lucky loser
- Alt = Alternate
- ITF = ITF entry
- PR = Protected ranking
- SR = Special ranking
- SE = Special exempt
- JE = Junior exempt
- JR = Junior Accelerator Programme entrant
- CO = College Accelerator Programme entrant
- NG = Next Gen Accelerator Program entrant
- w/o = Walkover
- r = Retired
- d = Defaulted

=== Indian Wells Masters ===
==== Singles ====
Quarterfinals
1	(Serbia) Novak Djokovic	w/o
32	(Australia) Bernard Tomic
4	(United Kingdom) Andy Murray	6	6
12	(Spain) Feliciano López	3	4
6	(Canada) Milos Raonic	4	7^{12}	7
3	(Spain) Rafael Nadal	6	6^{10}	5
9	(Czech Republic) Tomáš Berdych	4	0
2	(Switzerland) Roger Federer	6	6

Semifinals
1	(Serbia) Novak Djokovic	6	6
4	(United Kingdom) Andy Murray	2	3
6	(Canada) Milos Raonic	5	4
2	(Switzerland) Roger Federer	7	6

Final
1	(Serbia) Novak Djokovic	6	6^{5}	6
2	(Switzerland) Roger Federer	3	7^{7}	2

==== Doubles ====
Semifinals
8	(Canada) Vasek Pospisil (United States) Jack Sock	6	3	[10]
(Poland) Marcin Matkowski (Serbia) Nenad Zimonjić	4	6	[6]
(Italy) Simone Bolelli (Italy) Fabio Fognini	6	6
2	(Croatia) Ivan Dodig (Brazil) Marcelo Melo	4	3

Final
8	(Canada) Vasek Pospisil (United States) Jack Sock	6	6^{3}	[10]
(Italy) Simone Bolelli (Italy) Fabio Fognini	4	7^{7}	[7]

=== Miami Open ===
==== Singles ====
Quarterfinals
1	(Serbia) Novak Djokovic	7	7
6	(Spain) David Ferrer	5	5
4	(Japan) Kei Nishikori	4	3
22	(United States) John Isner	6	6
(Austria) Dominic Thiem	6	4	1
3	(United Kingdom) Andy Murray	3	6	6
8	(Czech Republic) Tomáš Berdych	6	6
(Argentina) Juan Mónaco	3	4

Semifinals
1	(Serbia) Novak Djokovic	7^{7}	6
22	(United States) John Isner	6^{3}	2
3	(United Kingdom) Andy Murray	6	6
8	(Czech Republic) Tomáš Berdych	4	4

Final
1	(Serbia) Novak Djokovic	7^{7}	4	6
3	(United Kingdom) Andy Murray	6^{3}	6	0

==== Doubles ====
Semifinals
1	(United States) Bob Bryan (United States) Mike Bryan	7^{7}	7
(United States) John Isner (United States) Sam Querrey	6^{5}	5
3	(Brazil) Marcelo Melo (Brazil) Bruno Soares	4	6	[7]
2	(Canada) Vasek Pospisil (United States) Jack Sock	6	3	[10]

Final
1	(United States) Bob Bryan (United States) Mike Bryan	6	1	[10]
2	(Canada) Vasek Pospisil (United States) Jack Sock	3	6	[8]

=== Monte-Carlo Masters ===
==== Singles ====
Quarterfinals
1	(Serbia) Novak Djokovic	6	6
8	(Croatia) Marin Čilić	0	3
3	(Spain) Rafael Nadal	6	5	6
5	(Spain) David Ferrer	4	7	2
6	(Czech Republic) Tomáš Berdych	5
4	(Canada) Milos Raonic	2^{r}
9	(Bulgaria) Grigor Dimitrov	1	3
14/WC	(France) Gaël Monfils	6	6

Semifinals
1	(Serbia) Novak Djokovic	6	6
3	(Spain) Rafael Nadal	3	3
6	(Czech Republic) Tomáš Berdych	6	6
14/WC	(France) Gaël Monfils	1	4

Final
1	(Serbia) Novak Djokovic	7	4	6
6	(Czech Republic) Tomáš Berdych	5	6	3

==== Doubles ====
Semifinals
1	(United States) Bob Bryan (United States) Mike Bryan	6	6
4	(Poland) Marcin Matkowski (Serbia) Nenad Zimonjić	4	2
(Italy) Simone Bolelli (Italy) Fabio Fognini	7^{8}	6
2	(Croatia) Ivan Dodig (Brazil) Marcelo Melo	6^{6}	3

Final
1	(United States) Bob Bryan (United States) Mike Bryan	7^{7}	6
(Italy) Simone Bolelli (Italy) Fabio Fognini	6^{3}	1

=== Madrid Open ===
==== Singles ====
Quarterfinals
16	(United States) John Isner	6	6^{7}	6^{1}
6	(Czech Republic) Tomáš Berdych	3	7^{9}	7^{7}
3	(Spain) Rafael Nadal	6	6
10	(Bulgaria) Grigor Dimitrov	3	4
7	(Spain) David Ferrer	4	2
4	(Japan) Kei Nishikori	6	6
5	(Canada) Milos Raonic	4	5
2	(United Kingdom) Andy Murray	6	7

Semifinals
6	(Czech Republic) Tomáš Berdych	6^{3}	1
3	(Spain) Rafael Nadal	7^{7}	6
4	(Japan) Kei Nishikori	3	4
2	(United Kingdom) Andy Murray	6	6

Final
3	(Spain) Rafael Nadal	3	2
2	(United Kingdom) Andy Murray	6	6

==== Doubles ====
Semifinals
(India) Rohan Bopanna (Romania) Florin Mergea	6^{4}	6	[11]
6	(Spain) Marcel Granollers (Spain) Marc López	7^{7}	3	[9]
5	(Poland) Marcin Matkowski (Serbia) Nenad Zimonjić	6	6^{5}	[10]
WC	(Spain) Feliciano López (Belarus) Max Mirnyi	3	7^{7}	[7]

Final
(India) Rohan Bopanna (Romania) Florin Mergea	6	6^{5}	[11]
5	(Poland) Marcin Matkowski (Serbia) Nenad Zimonjić	2	7^{7}	[9]

=== Italian Open ===
==== Singles ====
Quarterfinals
1	(Serbia) Novak Djokovic	6	3	6
5	(Japan) Kei Nishikori	3	6	1
(Belgium) David Goffin	2	6	3
7	(Spain) David Ferrer	6	4	6
8	(Switzerland) Stan Wawrinka	7^{9}	6
4	(Spain) Rafael Nadal	6^{7}	2
6	(Czech Republic) Tomáš Berdych	3	3
2	(Switzerland) Roger Federer	6	6

Semifinals
1	(Serbia) Novak Djokovic	6	6
7	(Spain) David Ferrer	4	4
8	(Switzerland) Stan Wawrinka	4	2
2	(Switzerland) Roger Federer	6	6

Final
1	(Serbia) Novak Djokovic	6	6
2	(Switzerland) Roger Federer	4	3

==== Doubles ====
Semifinals
(South Africa) Kevin Anderson (France) Jérémy Chardy	4	4
(Uruguay) Pablo Cuevas (Spain) David Marrero	6	6
5	(Spain) Marcel Granollers (Spain) Marc López	6	3	[11]
(Australia) Nick Kyrgios (United States) Jack Sock	1	6	[9]

Final
(Uruguay) Pablo Cuevas (Spain) David Marrero	6	7
5	(Spain) Marcel Granollers (Spain) Marc López	4	5

=== Canadian Open ===
==== Singles ====
Quarterfinals
1	(Serbia) Novak Djokovic	5	7^{9}	6
Q	(Latvia) Ernests Gulbis	7	6^{7}	1
16	(United States) John Isner	7^{11}	6^{13}	6^{4}
(France) Jérémy Chardy	6^{9}	7^{15}	7^{7}
7	(Spain) Rafael Nadal	2	4
4	(Japan) Kei Nishikori	6	6
10	(France) Jo-Wilfried Tsonga	4	4
2	(United Kingdom) Andy Murray	6	6

Semifinals
1	(Serbia) Novak Djokovic	6	6
(France) Jérémy Chardy	4	4
4	(Japan) Kei Nishikori	3	0
2	(United Kingdom) Andy Murray	6	6

Final
1	(Serbia) Novak Djokovic	4	6	3
2	(United Kingdom) Andy Murray	6	4	6

==== Doubles ====
Semifinals
1	(United States) Bob Bryan (United States) Mike Bryan	6^{7}	6	[10]
6	(Austria) Alexander Peya (Brazil) Bruno Soares	7^{9}	4	[6]
PR	(Serbia) Novak Djokovic (Serbia) Janko Tipsarević	6	1	[4]
(Canada) Daniel Nestor (France) Édouard Roger-Vasselin	3	6	[10]

Final
1	(United States) Bob Bryan (United States) Mike Bryan	7^{7}	3	[10]
(Canada) Daniel Nestor (France) Édouard Roger-Vasselin	6^{5}	6	[6]

=== Cincinnati Masters ===
==== Singles ====
Quarterfinals
1	(Serbia) Novak Djokovic	6	6
5	(Switzerland) Stan Wawrinka	4	1
Q	(Ukraine) Alexandr Dolgopolov	6	6
6	(Czech Republic) Tomáš Berdych	4	2
12	(France) Richard Gasquet	6	1	4
3	(United Kingdom) Andy Murray	4	6	6
(Spain) Feliciano López	3	4
2	(Switzerland) Roger Federer	6	6

Semifinals
1	(Serbia) Novak Djokovic	4	7^{7}	6
Q	(Ukraine) Alexandr Dolgopolov	6	6^{5}	2
3	(United Kingdom) Andy Murray	4	6^{6}
2	(Switzerland) Roger Federer	6	7^{8}

Final
1	(Serbia) Novak Djokovic	6^{1}	3
2	(Switzerland) Roger Federer	7^{7}	6

==== Doubles ====
Semifinals
(Canada) Daniel Nestor (France) Édouard Roger-Vasselin	7	6
(Spain) Feliciano López (Belarus) Max Mirnyi	5	4
6	(Poland) Marcin Matkowski (Serbia) Nenad Zimonjić	6	6
2	(Croatia) Ivan Dodig (Brazil) Marcelo Melo	4	4

Final
(Canada) Daniel Nestor (France) Édouard Roger-Vasselin	6	6
6	(Poland) Marcin Matkowski (Serbia) Nenad Zimonjić	2	2

=== Shanghai Masters ===
==== Singles ====
Quarterfinals
1	(Serbia) Novak Djokovic	7^{8}	6
(Australia) Bernard Tomic	6^{6}	1
3	(United Kingdom) Andy Murray	6	6
5	(Czech Republic) Tomáš Berdych	1	3
8	(Spain) Rafael Nadal	6	6
4	(Switzerland) Stan Wawrinka	2	1
12	(South Africa) Kevin Anderson	6^{6}	7	4
16	(France) Jo-Wilfried Tsonga	7^{8}	5	6

Semifinals
1	(Serbia) Novak Djokovic	6	6
3	(United Kingdom) Andy Murray	1	3
8	(Spain) Rafael Nadal	4	6	5
16	(France) Jo-Wilfried Tsonga	6	0	7

Final
1	(Serbia) Novak Djokovic	6	6
16	(France) Jo-Wilfried Tsonga	2	4

==== Doubles ====
Semifinals
7	(Canada) Daniel Nestor (France) Édouard Roger-Vasselin	7	6^{5}	[3]
5	(Italy) Simone Bolelli (Italy) Fabio Fognini	5	7^{7}	[10]
6	(South Africa) Raven Klaasen (Brazil) Marcelo Melo	6	6^{1}	[10]
8	(India) Rohan Bopanna (Poland) Łukasz Kubot	3	7^{7}	[7]

Final
5	(Italy) Simone Bolelli (Italy) Fabio Fognini	3	3
6	(South Africa) Raven Klaasen (Brazil) Marcelo Melo	6	6

=== Paris Masters ===
==== Singles ====
Quarterfinals
1	(Serbia) Novak Djokovic	7^{7}	7^{10}
5	(Czech Republic) Tomáš Berdych	6^{3}	6^{8}
4	(Switzerland) Stan Wawrinka	7^{10}	7^{9}
7	(Spain) Rafael Nadal	6^{8}	6^{7}
8	(Spain) David Ferrer	6	6^{6}	6
13	(United States) John Isner	3	7^{8}	2
10	(France) Richard Gasquet	6^{7}	6	3
2	(United Kingdom) Andy Murray	7^{9}	3	6

Semifinals
1	(Serbia) Novak Djokovic	6	3	6
4	(Switzerland) Stan Wawrinka	3	6	0
8	(Spain) David Ferrer	4	3
2	(United Kingdom) Andy Murray	6	6

Final
1	(Serbia) Novak Djokovic	6	6
2	(United Kingdom) Andy Murray	2	4

==== Doubles ====
Semifinals
(Canada) Vasek Pospisil (United States) Jack Sock	7^{8}	6
(United Kingdom) Dominic Inglot (Sweden) Robert Lindstedt	6^{6}	1
PR	(Czech Republic) Tomáš Berdych (Czech Republic) Radek Štěpánek	6	3	[5]
2	(Croatia) Ivan Dodig (Brazil) Marcelo Melo	4	6	[10]

Final
(Canada) Vasek Pospisil (United States) Jack Sock	6	3	[5]
2	(Croatia) Ivan Dodig (Brazil) Marcelo Melo	2	6	[10]

== See also ==
- ATP Tour Masters 1000
- 2015 ATP Tour
- 2015 WTA Premier Mandatory and Premier 5 tournaments
- 2015 WTA Tour
