= Caroline Garcia career statistics =

Career finals
Discipline	Type	Won	Lost	Total
Singles	Grand Slam	–	–	–
Singles	WTA Finals	1	0	1
Singles	WTA Elite	–	–	–
Singles	WTA 1000	3	0	3
Singles	WTA Tour	7	5	12
Singles	Olympics	–	–	–
Singles	Total	11	5	16
Doubles	Grand Slam	2	1	3
Doubles	WTA Finals	–	–	–
Doubles	WTA 1000	1	3	4
Doubles	WTA Tour	5	7	12
Doubles	Olympics	–	–	–
Doubles	Total	8	11	19

This is a list of the main career statistics of the French professional tennis player Caroline Garcia. Garcia has won eleven singles and eight doubles titles on the WTA Tour. Her most significant singles titles are the 2022 WTA Finals, Premier 5 Wuhan Open and the Premier Mandatory China Open, both achieved in 2017, and the WTA 1000 Cincinnati Open in 2022. In doubles, she has won two Grand Slam titles at the French Open in 2016 and 2022 and one Premier Mandatory Madrid Open, also in 2016. Garcia became the world No. 2 doubles player on 24 October 2016, and she achieved her highest singles ranking of world No. 4 in September 2018.

In singles, she also reached the quarter-finals of the French Open in 2016, as well as the semi-finals of the Madrid Open in 2018. She was a quarter-finalist at the Madrid Open and Wuhan Open in 2014, the Canadian Open in 2017 and the WTA Qatar Open, Italian Open and Canadian Open in 2018. In 2017 she reached the semi-finals of the year-end championship WTA Finals.

In doubles, along with her Grand Slam title, she finished as runner–up at the US Open in 2016, semi-finalist at the Australian Open in 2017 and quarter-finalist at the 2016 Wimbledon and 2015 US Open. In Premier-level tournaments, she finished as runner-up at the 2014 Wuhan Open, 2015 Canadian Open and 2016 China Open. At the WTA Finals, she was a semi-finalist in 2016.

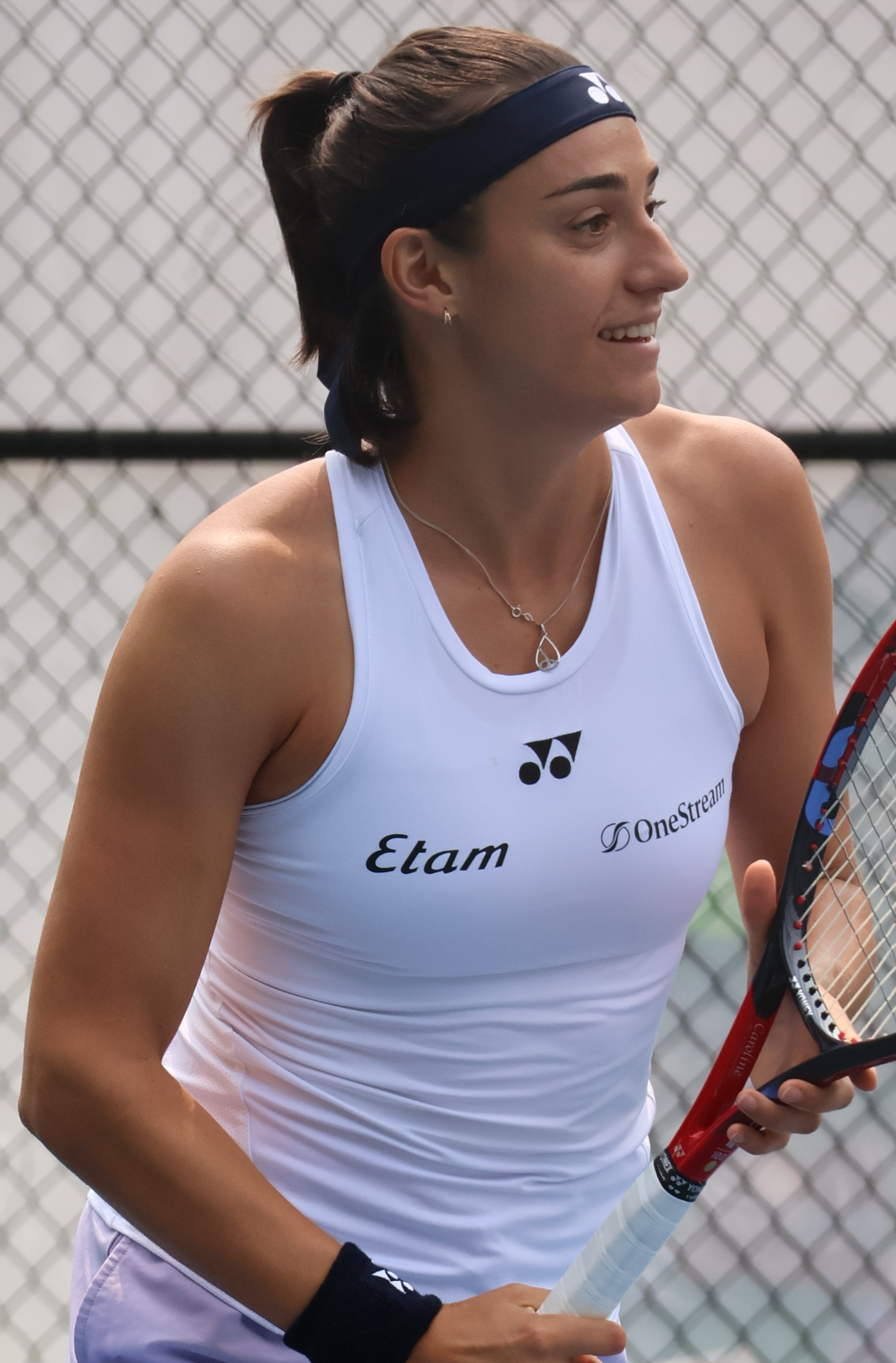
Garcia at the 2023 Washington Open.

== Performance timelines ==
Key
W	F	SF	QF	#R	RR	Q#	P#	DNQ	A	Z#	PO	G	S	B	NMS	NTI	P	NH

(W) winner; (F) finalist; (SF) semifinalist; (QF) quarterfinalist; (#R) rounds 4, 3, 2, 1; (RR) round-robin stage; (Q#) qualification round; (P#) preliminary round; (DNQ) did not qualify; (A) absent; (Z#) Davis/Fed Cup Zonal Group (with number indication) or (PO) play-off; (G) gold, (S) silver or (B) bronze Olympic/Paralympic medal; (NMS) not a Masters tournament; (NTI) not a Tier I tournament; (P) postponed; (NH) not held; (SR) strike rate (events won / competed); (W–L) win–loss record.
To avoid confusion and double counting, these charts are updated at the conclusion of a tournament or when the player's participation has ended.

Only main-draw results in WTA Tour, Grand Slam tournaments, Billie Jean King Cup, United Cup, Hopman Cup and Olympic Games are included in win–loss records.

=== Singles ===
Current through the 2025 WTA Tour.

Tournament	2010	2011	2012	2013	2014	2015	2016	2017	2018	2019	2020	2021	2022	2023	2024	2025	SR	W–L	Win %
Grand Slam tournaments
Australian Open	A	2R	Q3	1R	1R	3R	1R	3R	4R	3R	2R	2R	1R	4R	2R	1R	0 / 14	16–14	53%
French Open	Q1	2R	1R	2R	1R	1R	2R	QF	4R	2R	4R	2R	2R	2R	2R	1R	0 / 15	18–15	55%
Wimbledon	A	Q2	Q1	2R	3R	1R	2R	4R	1R	1R	NH	1R	4R	3R	2R	A	0 / 11	13–11	54%
US Open	A	Q1	Q2	2R	1R	1R	3R	3R	3R	1R	3R	2R	SF	1R	1R	1R	0 / 13	15–13	54%
Win–loss	0–0	2–2	0–1	3–4	2–4	2–4	4–4	11–4	8–4	3–4	6–3	3–4	9–4	6–4	3–4	0–3	0 / 53	62–53	54%
Year-end championships
WTA Finals	DNQ							SF	DNQ		NH	DNQ	W	DNQ			1 / 2	6–3	67%
WTA Elite Trophy (Note: WTA Tournament of Champions was held from 2009 to 2014, when WTA Elite Trophy replaced it.)	DNQ						RR	A	RR	DNQ	NH			RR	NH		0 / 3	3–3	50%
National representation
Summer Olympics	NH		A	NH			2R	NH				1R	NH		1R	NH	0 / 3	1–3	25%
Billie Jean King Cup (Note: Formerly known as Fed Cup until 2020.)	A	A	A	WG2	PO	SF	F	A	A	W	RR (Note: Edition is split into the two years due to COVID-19.)		QR (Note: Despite not playing in the qualifying round stage, she played in the play-offs.)	RR	QR	A	1 / 5	14–7	67%
WTA 1000 tournaments
Qatar Open (Note: The first Premier 5 event of the year has switched back and forth between the Dubai Tennis Championships and the Qatar Open since 2009. Dubai was classified as a Premier 5 event from 2009 to 2011 before being succeeded by Doha for the 2012–2014 period. In 2015, Dubai regained its Premier 5 status while Doha was demoted to Premier status. The Premier 5 tournaments were reclassified as WTA 1000 tournaments in 2021.)	A	A	1R	2R	1R	NMS	1R	NMS	QF	NMS	1R	NMS	2R	NMS	1R	2R	0 / 9	5–9	36%
Dubai Championships	A	A	NMS	NMS	NMS	2R	NMS	2R	NMS	2R	NMS	3R	NMS	2R	1R	1R	0 / 7	5–7	42%
Indian Wells Open	A	A	Q1	A	2R	4R	1R	4R	4R	2R	NH	2R	2R	4R	3R	2R	0 / 11	13–11	54%
Miami Open	A	A	Q1	A	3R	2R	3R	2R	2R	4R	NH	2R	1R	2R	QF	2R	0 / 11	11–11	50%
Madrid Open	A	A	A	A	QF	3R	2R	1R	SF	3R	NH	A	A	3R	3R	A	0 / 8	13–8	62%
Italian Open	A	A	A	A	A	1R	1R	2R	QF	1R	1R	2R	A	3R	3R	A	0 / 9	6–9	40%
Canadian Open	A	A	A	Q2	2R	1R	1R	QF	QF	1R	NH	1R	1R	2R	A	A	0 / 9	6–9	40%
Cincinnati Open	A	A	A	Q1	Q1	3R	1R	1R	3R	1R	2R	2R	W	2R	A	2R	1 / 10	12–9	57%
Guadalajara Open	NH												3R	SF	NMS		0 / 2	4–2	67%
Pan Pacific / Wuhan Open (Note: In 2014, the Pan Pacific Open was downgraded to a Premier event and replaced by the Wuhan Open. The Premier 5 tournaments were reclassified as WTA 1000 tournaments in 2021.)	A	A	1R	A	QF	2R	2R	W	2R	2R	NH				A	A	1 / 7	12–6	67%
China Open	A	A	A	Q1	2R	2R	3R	W	3R	1R	NH			QF	A	A	1 / 7	14–6	70%
Win–loss	0–0	0–0	0–2	1–1	10–7	9–9	6–9	18–7	15–9	6–9	1–3	6–6	9–5	10–9	6–6	4–5	3 / 90	101–87	54%
Career statistics
	2010	2011	2012	2013	2014	2015	2016	2017	2018	2019	2020	2021	2022	2023	2024	2025	SR	W–L	Win%
Tournaments	0	4	6	14	24	24	26	23	23	25	11	24	23	26	12	9	Career total: 284		
Titles	0	0	0	0	1	0	2	2	1	1	0	0	4	0	0	0	Career total: 11		
Finals	0	0	0	0	1	2	2	2	1	2	0	0	4	2	0	0	Career total: 16		
Hard win–loss	0–0	1–2	1–5	5–8	14–16	20–18	26–17	30–14	24–15	10–16	7–8	12–16	23–14	30–19	9–9	4–7	5 / 190	216–185	54%
Clay win–loss	0–0	1–1	0–1	2–5	9–4	6–6	7–7	12–6	13–5	10–8	4–3	8–6	11–3	4–4	5–4	0–1	3 / 67	92–64	59%
Grass win–loss	0–0	0–1	0–0	1–1	2–3	2–3	6–1	6–2	2–2	7–2	NH	1–2	10–3	6–3	1–1	0–0	3 / 27	44–24	65%
Overall win–loss	0–0	2–4	1–6	8–14	25–23	28–27	39–25	48–22	39–22	27–26	11–11	21–24	44–20	40–26	15–14	4–9	11 / 284	352–273	56%
Win (%)	–	33%	14%	36%	52%	51%	61%	69%	64%	51%	50%	47%	69%	61%	52%	31%	Career total: 56%		
Year-end ranking (Note: 2009: WTA Ranking–681.)	280	146	138	75	38	35	23	8	19	45	43	74	4	20	51	310	$18,283,326		

=== Doubles ===
Tournament	2011	2012	2013	2014	2015	2016	2017	2018	2019	2020	2021	2022	2023	2024	SR	W–L	Win%
Grand Slam tournaments
Australian Open	A	A	A	3R	3R	3R	SF	A	A	A	A	2R	A	QF	0 / 6	14–6	70%
French Open	1R	1R	2R	1R	3R	W	A	A	A	A	A	W	A	A	2 / 7	15–5	75%
Wimbledon	A	A	Q1	2R	2R	QF	A	A	A	NH	1R	A	QF	3R	0 / 6	10–6	63%
US Open	A	A	2R	2R	QF	F	A	A	A	A	1R	QF	A	A	0 / 6	13–6	68%
Win–loss	0–1	0–1	2–2	4–4	8–4	16–3	4–1	0–0	0–0	0–0	0–2	10–2	3–1	5–2	2 / 25	52–23	69%
Year-end championships
WTA Finals	DNQ				RR	SF	DNQ			NH	DNQ	Alt	DNQ		0 / 1	2–3	40%
WTA 1000 tournaments
Dubai / Qatar Open	A	A	2R	2R	SF	2R	QF	A	A	1R	A	A	A		0 / 6	6–6	50%
Indian Wells Open	A	A	A	A	QF	A	1R	A	1R	NH	A	A	A	1R	0 / 4	2–4	33%
Miami Open	A	A	A	A	QF	1R	A	A	A	NH	QF	A	A	A	0 / 3	4–3	57%
Madrid Open	A	A	A	1R	1R	W	A	A	A	NH	A	A	A	A	1 / 3	5–2	71%
Italian Open	A	A	A	A	SF	QF	A	A	A	A	1R	A	A	A	0 / 3	4–3	57%
Canadian Open	A	A	A	2R	F	QF	A	A	A	NH	A	A	1R	A	0 / 4	5–4	56%
Cincinnati Open	A	A	A	1R	2R	2R	A	A	A	A	A	1R	1R	A	0 / 5	0–5	0%
Pan Pacific / Wuhan Open	A	A	A	F	2R	2R	A	A	QF	NH				A	0 / 3	6–4	60%
China Open	A	A	A	A	2R	F	A	A	A	NH			2R	A	0 / 3	5–3	63%
Guadalajara Open	NH											A	A	NMS	0 / 0	0–0	–
Career statistics
	2011	2012	2013	2014	2015	2016	2017	2018	2019	2020	2021	2022	2023	2024	SR	W–L	Win%
Tournaments	1	4	10	18	18	16	3	0	4	4	6	4	2	7	Career total: 97		
Titles	0	0	0	1	1	4	0	0	0	0	0	1	1	0	Career total: 8		
Finals	0	0	0	4	4	7	0	0	0	0	0	1	1	1	Career total: 18		
Overall win–loss	0–1	0–4	6–10	28–17	30–17	38–12	5–3	0–0	5–4	4–4	2–6	10–3	8–1	10–7	8 / 97	146–89	62%
Win (%)	0%	0%	38%	62%	64%	76%	63%	—	56%	50%	25%	77%	89%	59%	Career total: 62%		
Year-end ranking	309	167	115	26	14	2	73	N/A	247	143	172	26	90				

== Grand Slam tournaments finals ==
Garcia has reached three Grand Slam tournament finals in doubles. First, she reached final of French Open in 2016 alongside Kristina Mladenovic, where they defeated Russian combination Ekaterina Makarova–Elena Vesnina in three sets. Later the same year, Garcia again with Mladenovic reached another Grand Slam final at the US Open, losing to Bethanie Mattek-Sands and Lucie Šafářová. In 2022, she won the French Open doubles title again alongside Mladenovic, defeating Coco Gauff and Jessica Pegula in the final.

=== Doubles: 3 (2 titles, 1 runner-up) ===
Result	Year	Tournament	Surface	Partner	Opponents	Score
Win	2016	French Open	Clay	(France) Kristina Mladenovic	(Russia) Ekaterina Makarova (Russia) Elena Vesnina	6–3, 2–6, 6–4
Loss	2016	US Open	Hard	(France) Kristina Mladenovic	(United States) Bethanie Mattek-Sands (Czech Republic) Lucie Šafářová	6–2, 6–7^{(5–7)}, 4–6
Win	2022	French Open (2)	Clay	(France) Kristina Mladenovic	(United States) Coco Gauff (United States) Jessica Pegula	2–6, 6–3, 6–2

== Other significant finals ==
In singles, Garcia has won one Premier 5 tournament at the Wuhan Open, and one Premier Mandatory tournament in China Open, both in 2017. In doubles, she has won one Premier Mandatory title at the Madrid Open in 2016. She also finished as runner-up at the two Premier 5 tournaments, Wuhan Open in 2014 and Canadian Open in 2015 and at one Premier Mandatory tournament, the China Open in 2016.

=== Year-end championships (WTA Finals) ===
==== Singles: 1 (title) ====
Result	Year	Tournament	Surface	Opponent	Score
Win	2022	WTA Finals, United States	Hard (i)	Aryna Sabalenka	7–6^{(7–4)}, 6–4

=== WTA 1000 tournaments ===
==== Singles: 3 (3 titles) ====
Result	Year	Tournament	Surface	Opponent	Score
Win	2017	Wuhan Open	Hard	(Australia) Ashleigh Barty	6–7^{(3–7)}, 7–6^{(7–4)}, 6–2
Win	2017	China Open	Hard	(Romania) Simona Halep	6–4, 7–6^{(7–3)}
Win	2022	Cincinnati Open	Hard	(Czech Republic) Petra Kvitová	6–2, 6–4

==== Doubles: 4 (1 title, 3 runner-ups) ====
Result	Year	Tournament	Surface	Partner	Opponents	Score
Loss	2014	Wuhan Open	Hard	(Zimbabwe) Cara Black	(Switzerland) Martina Hingis; (Italy) Flavia Pennetta	4–6, 7–5, [10–12]
Loss	2015	Canadian Open	Hard	(Slovenia) Katarina Srebotnik	(United States) Bethanie Mattek-Sands; (Czech Republic) Lucie Šafářová	1–6, 2–6
Win	2016	Madrid Open	Clay	(France) Kristina Mladenovic	(Switzerland) Martina Hingis (India) Sania Mirza	6–4, 6–4
Loss	2016	China Open	Hard	(France) Kristina Mladenovic	(United States) Bethanie Mattek-Sands (Czech Republic) Lucie Šafářová	4–6, 4–6

== WTA Tour finals ==
Garcia debuted on the WTA Tour in 2011. Since then, she has reached 16 singles finals, winning 11 of them, including three WTA 1000 titles at the 2017 Wuhan Open, the 2017 China Open, and the 2022 Western & Southern Open, as well as the 2022 WTA Finals. In doubles, she has reached 19 finals, winning eight of them, including French Open titles in 2016 and 2022 alongside Kristina Mladenovic.

=== Singles: 16 (11 titles, 5 runner-ups) ===
Legend Grand Slam WTA Finals (1–0) WTA 1000 (3–0) WTA 500 WTA 250 (7–5)	Finals by surface Hard (5–4) Clay (3–1) Grass (3–0)	Finals by setting Outdoor (10–4) Indoor (1–1)

Result	W–L	Date	Tournament	Tier	Surface	Opponent	Score
Win	1–0	Apr 2014	Copa Colsanitas, Colombia	International (Note: The WTA International tournaments were reclassified as WTA 250 tournaments in 2021.)	Clay	(Serbia) Jelena Janković	6–3, 6–4
Loss	1–1	Feb 2015	Mexican Open, Mexico	International	Hard	(Switzerland) Timea Bacsinszky	3–6, 0–6
Loss	1–2	Mar 2015	Monterrey Open, Mexico	International	Hard	(Switzerland) Timea Bacsinszky	6–4, 2–6, 4–6
Win	2–2	May 2016	Internationaux de Strasbourg, France	International	Clay	(Croatia) Mirjana Lučić-Baroni	6–4, 6–1
Win	3–2	Jun 2016	Mallorca Open, Spain	International	Grass	(Latvia) Anastasija Sevastova	6–3, 6–4
Win	4–2	Sep 2017	Wuhan Open, China	Premier 5 (Note: The WTA Premier 5 & Mandatory tournaments were reclassified as WTA 1000 tournaments in 2021.)	Hard	(Australia) Ashleigh Barty	6–7^{(3–7)}, 7–6^{(7–4)}, 6–2
Win	5–2	Oct 2017	China Open, China	Premier M	Hard	(Romania) Simona Halep	6–4, 7–6^{(7–3)}
Win	6–2	Oct 2018	Tianjin Open, China	International	Hard	(Czech Republic) Karolína Plíšková	7–6^{(9–7)}, 6–3
Loss	6–3	May 2019	Internationaux de Strasbourg, France	International	Clay	(Ukraine) Dayana Yastremska	4–6, 7–5, 6–7^{(3–7)}
Win	7–3	Jun 2019	Nottingham Open, United Kingdom	International	Grass	(Croatia) Donna Vekić	2–6, 7–6^{(7–4)}, 7–6^{(7–4)}
Win	8–3	Jun 2022	Bad Homburg Open, Germany	WTA 250	Grass	(Canada) Bianca Andreescu	6–7^{(5–7)}, 6–4, 6–4
Win	9–3	Jul 2022	Poland Open, Poland	WTA 250	Clay	(Romania) Ana Bogdan	6–4, 6–1
Win	10–3	Aug 2022	Cincinnati Open, United States	WTA 1000	Hard	(Czech Republic) Petra Kvitová	6–2, 6–4
Win	11–3	Nov 2022	WTA Finals, United States	Finals	Hard (i)	Aryna Sabalenka	7–6^{(7–4)}, 6–4
Loss	11–4	Feb 2023	Lyon Open, France	WTA 250	Hard (i)	(United States) Alycia Parks	6–7^{(7–9)}, 5–7
Loss	11–5	Mar 2023	Monterrey Open, Mexico	WTA 250	Hard	(Croatia) Donna Vekić	4–6, 6–3, 5–7

=== Doubles: 19 (8 titles, 11 runner–ups) ===
Legend Grand Slam (2–1) WTA Finals WTA 1000 (1–3) WTA 500 (4–6) WTA 250 (1–1)	Finals by surface Hard (0–10) Clay (6–1) Grass (2–0)	Finals by setting Outdoor (7–8) Indoor (1–3)

Result	W–L	Date	Tournament	Tier	Surface	Partner	Opponents	Score
Win	1–0	Apr 2014	Copa Colsanitas, Colombia	International	Clay	(Spain) Lara Arruabarrena	(United States) Vania King (South Africa) Chanelle Scheepers	7–6^{(7–5)}, 6–4
Loss	1–1	Sep 2014	Wuhan Open, China	Premier 5	Hard	(Zimbabwe) Cara Black	(Switzerland) Martina Hingis (Italy) Flavia Pennetta	4–6, 7–5, [10–12]
Loss	1–2	Oct 2014	Ladies Linz, Austria	International	Hard (i)	(Germany) Annika Beck	(Romania) Raluca Olaru (United States) Anna Tatishvili	2–6, 1–6
Loss	1–3	Oct 2014	Kremlin Cup, Russia	Premier (Note: The WTA Premier tournaments were reclassified as WTA 500 tournaments in 2021.)	Hard (i)	(Spain) Arantxa Parra Santonja	(Switzerland) Martina Hingis (Italy) Flavia Pennetta	3–6, 5–7
Loss	1–4	Jan 2015	Brisbane International, Australia	Premier	Hard	(Slovenia) Katarina Srebotnik	(Switzerland) Martina Hingis (Germany) Sabine Lisicki	2–6, 5–7
Loss	1–5	Apr 2015	Stuttgart Open, Germany	Premier	Clay (i)	(Slovenia) Katarina Srebotnik	(United States) Bethanie Mattek-Sands (Czech Republic) Lucie Šafářová	4–6, 3–6
Win	2–5	Jun 2015	Eastbourne International, United Kingdom	Premier	Grass	(Slovenia) Katarina Srebotnik	(Chinese Taipei) Chan Yung-jan (China) Zheng Jie	7–6^{(7–5)}, 6–2
Loss	2–6	Aug 2015	Canadian Open, Canada	Premier 5	Hard	(Slovenia) Katarina Srebotnik	(United States) Bethanie Mattek-Sands (Czech Republic) Lucie Šafářová	1–6, 2–6
Loss	2–7	Jan 2016	Sydney International, Australia	Premier	Hard	(France) Kristina Mladenovic	(Switzerland) Martina Hingis (India) Sania Mirza	6–1, 5–7, [5–10]
Loss	2–8	Feb 2016	Dubai Championships, United Arab Emirates	Premier	Hard	(France) Kristina Mladenovic	(Chinese Taipei) Chuang Chia-jung (Croatia) Darija Jurak	4–6, 4–6
Win	3–8	Apr 2016	Charleston Open, United States	Premier	Clay (green)	(France) Kristina Mladenovic	(United States) Bethanie Mattek-Sands (Czech Republic) Lucie Šafářová	6–2, 7–5
Win	4–8	Apr 2016	Stuttgart Open, Germany	Premier	Clay (i)	(France) Kristina Mladenovic	(Switzerland) Martina Hingis (India) Sania Mirza	2–6, 6–1, [10–6]
Win	5–8	May 2016	Madrid Open, Spain	Premier M	Clay	(France) Kristina Mladenovic	(Switzerland) Martina Hingis (India) Sania Mirza	6–4, 6–4
Win	6–8	Jun 2016	French Open, France	Grand Slam	Clay	(France) Kristina Mladenovic	(Russia) Ekaterina Makarova; (Russia) Elena Vesnina	6–3, 2–6, 6–4
Loss	6–9	Sep 2016	US Open, United States	Grand Slam	Hard	(France) Kristina Mladenovic	(United States) Bethanie Mattek-Sands (Czech Republic) Lucie Šafářová	6–2, 6–7^{(5–7)}, 4–6
Loss	6–10	Oct 2016	China Open, China	Premier M	Hard	(France) Kristina Mladenovic	(United States) Bethanie Mattek-Sands (Czech Republic) Lucie Šafářová	4–6, 4–6
Win	7–10	Jun 2022	French Open, France (2)	Grand Slam	Clay	(France) Kristina Mladenovic	(United States) Coco Gauff (United States) Jessica Pegula	2–6, 6–3, 6–2
Win	8–10	Jun 2023	Berlin Open, Germany	WTA 500	Grass	(Brazil) Luisa Stefani	(Czech Republic) Kateřina Siniaková (Czech Republic) Markéta Vondroušová	4–6, 7–6^{(10–8)}, [10–4]
Loss	8–11	Jan 2024	Adelaide International, Australia	WTA 500	Hard	(France) Kristina Mladenovic	(Brazil) Beatriz Haddad Maia (United States) Taylor Townsend	5–7, 3–6

== National and international representation ==
Garcia was part of France women's national team in 2016 Fed Cup, where they lost in the final against Czech Republic. Despite that heartbreaking result, three years later she and French team won 2019 edition, defeating Australia in the final.

=== National team finals: 2 (1 title, 1 runner-up) ===
Result	Date	Team competition	Surface	Partner(s)/team	Opponents	Score
Loss	Nov 2016	Fed Cup, France	Hard (i)	(France) Alizé Cornet (France) Kristina Mladenovic (France) Pauline Parmentier	(Czech Republic) Karolína Plíšková (Czech Republic) Lucie Hradecká (Czech Republic) Petra Kvitová (Czech Republic) Barbora Strýcová	2–3
Win	Nov 2019	Fed Cup, Australia	Hard	(France) Alizé Cornet (France) Kristina Mladenovic (France) Pauline Parmentier	(Australia) Ashleigh Barty (Australia) Ajla Tomljanović (Australia) Samantha Stosur (Australia) Astra Sharma	3–2

== WTA 125 tournament finals ==
=== Singles: 2 (1 title, 1 runner-up) ===
Result	W–L	Date	Tournament	Surface	Opponent	Score
Win	1–0	Nov 2015	Open de Limoges, France	Hard (i)	(United States) Louisa Chirico	6–1, 6–3
Loss	1–1	Nov 2016	Open de Limoges, France	Hard (i)	(Russia) Ekaterina Alexandrova	4–6, 0–6

=== Doubles: 1 (title) ===
Result	W–L	Date	Tournament	Surface	Partner	Opponents	Score
Win	1–0	Nov 2013	Taipei Ladies Open, Taiwan	Carpet (i)	(Kazakhstan) Yaroslava Shvedova	(Germany) Anna-Lena Friedsam; (Belgium) Alison Van Uytvanck	6–3, 6–3

== ITF Circuit finals ==
Garcia debuted at the ITF Women's World Tennis Tour in 2008 at the 10k event in Bournemouth in the United Kingdom. In singles, she has been in four finals and has won only one of them, while in doubles she has been in five finals and has won three of them. Her biggest title on the ITF Tour was $100K Open de Cagnes-sur-Mer in singles event in May 2013, while in doubles she has won 50k Open Saint-Gaudens in 2011, also in France.

=== Singles: 4 (1 title, 3 runner-ups) ===
Legend $100,000 tournaments (1–0) $50,000 tournaments (0–1) $25,000 tournaments (0–2)	Finals by surface Hard (0–1) Clay (1–2)

Result	W–L	Date	Tournament	Tier	Surface	Opponent	Score
Loss	0–1	Jul 2010	ITF Aschaffenburg, Germany	25,000	Clay	(Romania) Mădălina Gojnea	1–6, 0–6
Loss	0–2	Apr 2011	ITF Osprey, United States	25,000	Clay	(France) Claire de Gubernatis	4–6, 4–6
Loss	0–3	Aug 2011	Tatarstan Open, Russia	50,000	Hard	(Russia) Yulia Putintseva	4–6, 2–6
Win	1–3	May 2013	Open de Cagnes-sur-Mer, France	100,000	Clay	(Ukraine) Maryna Zanevska	6–0, 4–6, 6–3

=== Doubles: 5 (3 titles, 2 runner-ups) ===
Legend $100,000 tournaments (1–0) $50,000 tournaments (1–0) $25,000 tournaments (0–2) $10,000 tournaments (1–0)	Finals by surface Hard (1–0) Clay (2–1) Grass (0–1)

Result	W–L	Date	Tournament	Tier	Surface	Partner	Opponents	Score
Win	1–0	Sep 2009	ITF Espinho, Portugal	10,000	Clay	(France) Elixane Lechemia	(Ukraine) Mishel Okhremchuk (France) Morgane Pons	7–5, 6–1
Loss	1–1	Aug 2010	ITF Limoges, France	25,000	Clay	(France) Claire Feuerstein	(Ukraine) Lyudmyla Kichenok (Ukraine) Nadiia Kichenok	7–6^{(7–5)}, 4–6, [8–10]
Win	2–1	May 2011	Open Saint-Gaudens, France	50,000	Clay	(France) Aurélie Védy	(Russia) Anastasia Pivovarova (Ukraine) Olga Savchuk	6–3, 6–3
Win	3–1	Oct 2012	Suzhou Ladies Open, China	100,000	Hard	(Switzerland) Timea Bacsinszky	(China) Yang Zhaoxuan (China) Zhao Yijing	7–5, 6–3
Loss	3–2	Oct 2012	ITF Makinohara, Japan	25,000	Grass	(Australia) Monique Adamczak	(Japan) Eri Hozumi (Japan) Miyu Kato	6–7^{(6–8)}, 3–6

== WTA Tour career earnings ==
Current after the 2024 Australian Open.

Year	Grand Slam singles titles	WTA singles titles	Total singles titles	Earnings ($)	Money list rank
2013	0	0	0	286,677	89
2014	0	1	1	698,532	39
2015	0	0	0	902,708	34
2016	0	2	2	1,804,200	17
2017	0	2	2	3,427,150	8
2018	0	1	1	2,039,824	20
2019	0	1	1	778,316	52
2020	0	0	0	532,140	38
2021	0	0	0	598,223	58
2022	0	4	4	3,353,354	3
2023	0	0	0	1,867,095	16
2024	0	0	0	573,284	7
Career	0	11	11	17,504,520	27

== Seedings ==
Garcia first been seeded at the French Open in 2015 as seed No. 31. Season of 2017, was her first season when she was seeded at the all majors in a singles year. During the 2018 season, she was seeded at the all majors as eighth seed or higher. She was highest seeded at the Wimbledon and US Open in 2018 as seed No. 6.

The tournaments won by Garcia are in boldface, and advanced into finals by Garcia are in italics.

Year	Australian Open	French Open	Wimbledon	US Open
2010	absent	did not qualify	absent	absent
2011	wildcard	wildcard	did not qualify	did not qualify
2012	did not qualify	wildcard	did not qualify	did not qualify
2013	wildcard	wildcard	qualifier	not seeded
2014	not seeded	not seeded	not seeded	not seeded
2015	not seeded	31st	32nd	not seeded
2016	32nd	not seeded	30th	25th
2017	21st	28th	21st	18th
2018	8th	7th	6th	6th
2019	19th	24th	23rd	27th
2020	not seeded	not seeded	cancelled	not seeded
2021	not seeded	not seeded	not seeded	not seeded
2022	not seeded	not seeded	not seeded	17th
2023	4th	5th	5th	7th
2024	16th	21st	23rd	28th

== Wins against top-10 players ==
- Garcia has a 26–55 record against players who were, at the time the match was played, ranked in the top 10.

#	Opponent	Rk	Event	Surface	Rd	Score	GRk	Ref
2014
1.	(Serbia) Jelena Janković	9	Copa Colsanitas, Colombia	Clay	F	6–3, 6–4	74	
2.	(Germany) Angelique Kerber	8	Madrid Open, Spain	Clay	1R	6–3, 2–0 ret.	51	
3.	(Poland) Agnieszka Radwańska	6	Wuhan Open, China	Hard	2R	3–6, 7–6^{(7–4)}, 7–6^{(9–7)}	49	
2015
4.	(Serbia) Ana Ivanovic	6	Monterrey Open, Mexico	Hard	SF	6–1, 6–4	29	
5.	(Serbia) Ana Ivanovic	6	Indian Wells Open, US	Hard	3R	6–2, 5–7, 6–2	28	
6.	(Serbia) Ana Ivanovic	6	Stuttgart Open, Germany	Clay (i)	1R	7–6^{(8–6)}, 6–4	29	
7.	(Czech Republic) Petra Kvitová	4	Cincinnati Open, US	Hard	2R	7–5, 4–6, 6–2	39	
2016
8.	(Czech Republic) Karolína Plíšková	6	Fed Cup, France	Hard (i)	F	6–3, 3–6, 6–3	24	
2017
9.	(Slovakia) Dominika Cibulková	9	Wuhan Open, China	Hard	3R	6–3, 7–5	20	
10.	(Ukraine) Elina Svitolina	3	China Open, China	Hard	QF	6–7^{(5–7)}, 7–5, 7–6^{(8–6)}	15	
11.	(Romania) Simona Halep	2	China Open, China	Hard	F	6–4, 7–6^{(7–3)}	15	
12.	(Ukraine) Elina Svitolina	4	WTA Finals, Singapore	Hard (i)	RR	6–7^{(7–9)}, 6–3, 7–5	8	
13.	(Denmark) Caroline Wozniacki	6	WTA Finals, Singapore	Hard (i)	RR	0–6, 6–3, 7–5	8	
2018
14.	(Ukraine) Elina Svitolina	4	Stuttgart Open, Germany	Clay (i)	QF	6–7^{(4–7)}, 6–4, 6–2	7	
15.	(United States) Sloane Stephens	10	Italian Open, Italy	Clay	3R	6–1, 7–6^{(9–7)}	7	
16.	(Czech Republic) Karolína Plíšková	6	Tianjin Open, China	Hard	F	7–6^{(9–7)}, 6–3	16	
2020
17.	(Czech Republic) Karolína Plíšková	3	US Open, United States	Hard	2R	6–1, 7–6^{(7–2)}	50	
2022
18.	(Poland) Iga Świątek	1	Poland Open, Poland	Clay	QF	6–1, 1–6, 6–4	45	
19.	(Greece) Maria Sakkari	3	Cincinnati Open, US	Hard	2R	7–6^{(7–2)}, 6–7^{(6–8)}, 6–1	35	
20.	(United States) Jessica Pegula	8	Cincinnati Open, US	Hard	QF	6–1, 7–5	35	
21.	Aryna Sabalenka	7	Cincinnati Open, US	Hard	SF	6–2, 4–6, 6–1	35	
22.	(United States) Coco Gauff	4	WTA Finals, United States	Hard (i)	RR	6–4, 6–3	6	
23.	Daria Kasatkina	8	WTA Finals, United States	Hard (i)	RR	4–6, 6–1, 7–6^{(7–5)}	6	
24.	(Greece) Maria Sakkari	5	WTA Finals, United States	Hard (i)	SF	6–3, 6–2	6	
25.	Aryna Sabalenka	7	WTA Finals, United States	Hard (i)	F	7–6^{(7–4)}, 6–4	6	
2024
26.	(United States) Coco Gauff	3	Miami Open, US	Hard	4R	6–3, 1–6, 6–2	27	

== Longest winning streaks ==
=== 11-match win streak (2017) ===
#	Tournament	Category	Start date	Surface	Rd	Opponent	Rank	Score
–	Pan Pacific Open	Premier	18 September 2017	Hard	QF	(Spain) Garbiñe Muguruza	No. 1	2–6, 4–6
1	Wuhan Open	Premier 5	24 September 2017	Hard	1R	(Germany) Angelique Kerber (12)	No. 12	3–6, 6–3, 6–1
2	Wuhan Open	Premier 5	24 September 2017	Hard	2R	(United States) Christina McHale (Q)	No. 79	6–1, 6–1
3	Wuhan Open	Premier 5	24 September 2017	Hard	3R	(Slovakia) Dominika Cibulková (7)	No. 9	6–3, 7–5
4	Wuhan Open	Premier 5	24 September 2017	Hard	QF	(Russia) Ekaterina Makarova	No. 35	7–6^{(7–3)}, 6–4
5	Wuhan Open	Premier 5	24 September 2017	Hard	SF	(Greece) Maria Sakkari (Q)	No. 80	6–3, 6–2
6	Wuhan Open	Premier 5	24 September 2017	Hard	F	(Australia) Ashleigh Barty	No. 37	6–7^{(3–7)}, 7–6^{(7–4)}, 6–2
7	China Open	Premier Mandatory	2 October 2017	Hard	2R	(Belgium) Elise Mertens	No. 38	7–6^{(7–4)}, 6–4
8	China Open	Premier Mandatory	2 October 2017	Hard	3R	(France) Alizé Cornet	No. 37	6–2, 6–1
9	China Open	Premier Mandatory	2 October 2017	Hard	QF	(Ukraine) Elina Svitolina (3)	No. 3	6–7^{(5–7)}, 7–5, 7–6^{(8–6)}
10	China Open	Premier Mandatory	2 October 2017	Hard	SF	(Czech Republic) Petra Kvitová (12)	No. 18	6–3, 7–5
11	China Open	Premier Mandatory	2 October 2017	Hard	F	(Romania) Simona Halep (2)	No. 2	6–4, 7–6^{(7–3)}
–	WTA Finals	WTA Finals	22 October 2017	Hard (i)	RR	(Romania) Simona Halep (1)	No. 1	4–6, 2–6

=== 11-match win streak (2022) ===
#	Tournament	Category	Start date	Surface	Rd	Opponent	Rank	Score
–	Canadian Open	WTA 1000	8 August 2022	Hard	1R	(France) Alizé Cornet	No. 40	6–3, 3–6, 3–6
1	Cincinnati Masters	WTA 1000	15 August 2022	Hard	1R	(Croatia) Petra Martić (LL)	No. 56	6–3, 6–3
2	Cincinnati Masters	WTA 1000	15 August 2022	Hard	2R	(Greece) Maria Sakkari (4)	No. 3	7–6^{(7–2)}, 6–7^{(6–8)}, 6–1
3	Cincinnati Masters	WTA 1000	15 August 2022	Hard	3R	(Belgium) Elise Mertens	No. 33	6–4, 7–5
4	Cincinnati Masters	WTA 1000	15 August 2022	Hard	QF	(United States) Jessica Pegula (7)	No. 8	6–1, 7–5
5	Cincinnati Masters	WTA 1000	15 August 2022	Hard	SF	Aryna Sabalenka (6)	No. 7	6–2, 4–6, 6–1
6	Cincinnati Masters	WTA 1000	15 August 2022	Hard	F	(Czechoslovakia) Petra Kvitová	No. 28	6–2, 6–4
7	US Open	Grand Slam	29 August 2022	Hard	1R	Kamilla Rakhimova (LL)	No. 90	6–2, 6–4
8	US Open	Grand Slam	29 August 2022	Hard	2R	Anna Kalinskaya	No. 60	6–3, 6–1
9	US Open	Grand Slam	29 August 2022	Hard	3R	(Canada) Bianca Andreescu	No. 48	6–3, 6–2
10	US Open	Grand Slam	29 August 2022	Hard	4R	(United States) Alison Riske-Amritraj (29)	No. 29	6–4, 6–1
11	US Open	Grand Slam	29 August 2022	Hard	QF	(United States) Coco Gauff (12)	No. 12	6–3, 6–4
–	US Open	Grand Slam	29 August 2022	Hard	SF	(Tunisia) Ons Jabeur (5)	No. 5	1–6, 3–6
