= 2016 Mallorca Open =

- Date: 13–19 June
- Edition: 1st
- Category: WTA International
- Draw: 32S / 16D
- Prize money: $250,000
- Surface: Grass
- Location: Santa Ponsa, Mallorca, Spain
- Venue: Santa Ponsa Tennis Club

Champions

Singles
- (France) Caroline Garcia

Doubles
- (Canada) Gabriela Dabrowski / (Spain) María José Martínez Sánchez
- Mallorca Open

The 2016 Mallorca Open was a women's tennis tournament played on grass courts. It was the inaugural edition of the Mallorca Open, and part of the International category of the 2016 WTA Tour. It took place at Santa Ponsa Tennis Club in Mallorca, Spain, from 13 June until 19 June 2016. Sixth-seeded Caroline Garcia won the singles title.

== Finals ==
=== Singles ===
(France) Caroline Garcia defeated (Latvia) Anastasija Sevastova, 6–3, 6–4

- It was Garcia's 2nd and last singles title of the year and the 3rd of her career.

=== Doubles ===
- (Canada) Gabriela Dabrowski / (Spain) María José Martínez Sánchez defeated (Germany) Anna-Lena Friedsam / (Germany) Laura Siegemund, 6–4, 6–2

== Points and prize money ==
=== Point distribution ===
Event	W	F	SF	QF	Round of 16	Round of 32	Q	Q3	Q2	Q1
Singles	280	180	110	60	30	1	18	14	10	1
Doubles	280	180	110	60	1	—N/a	—N/a	—N/a	—N/a	—N/a

=== Prize money ===
Event	W	F	SF	QF	Round of 16	Round of 32	Q	Q2	Q1
Singles	€34,677	€17,258	€9,113	€4,758	€2,669	€1,552	€810	€589	€427
Doubles	€9,919	€5,161	€2,770	€1,468	€774	—N/a	—N/a	—N/a	—N/a

== WTA singles main-draw entrants ==
=== Seeds ===
Country	Player	Rank^{1}	Seed
ESP	Garbiñe Muguruza	2	1
SRB	Jelena Janković	24	2
SRB	Ana Ivanovic	25	3
FRA	Kristina Mladenovic	32	4
KAZ	Yulia Putintseva	35	5
FRA	Caroline Garcia	38	6
GER	Laura Siegemund	42	7
CAN	Eugenie Bouchard	46	8

- ^{1} Rankings are as of June 6, 2016.

=== Other entrants ===
The following players received wildcards into the main draw:

- (Spain) Paula Badosa Gibert
- (Slovakia) Daniela Hantuchová
- (Spain) Sara Sorribes Tormo

The following players received entry from the qualifying draw:

- (Romania) Ana Bogdan
- (Paraguay) Verónica Cepede Royg
- (Romania) Sorana Cîrstea
- (Belgium) Elise Mertens

=== Withdrawals ===
Before the tournament

- (Germany) Annika Beck → replaced by (Kazakhstan) Yaroslava Shvedova
- (Germany) Mona Barthel → replaced by (Croatia) Ana Konjuh
- (Italy) Sara Errani → replaced by (Germany) Carina Witthöft
- (Sweden) Johanna Larsson → replaced by (Italy) Francesca Schiavone
- (Romania) Monica Niculescu → replaced by (Latvia) Anastasija Sevastova
- (China) Zhang Shuai → replaced by (France) Pauline Parmentier

== WTA doubles main-draw entrants ==
=== Seeds ===
Country	Player	Country	Player	Rank^{1}	Seed
USA	Raquel Atawo	USA	Abigail Spears	42	1
ESP	Anabel Medina Garrigues	ESP	Arantxa Parra Santonja	62	2
JPN	Eri Hozumi	JPN	Miyu Kato	129	3
CAN	Gabriela Dabrowski	ESP	María José Martínez Sánchez	130	4

- ^{1} Rankings are as of 6 June 2016.

=== Other entrants ===
The following pairs received wildcards into the doubles main draw:

- (Canada) Eugenie Bouchard / (Germany) Sabine Lisicki
- (Belgium) Kirsten Flipkens / (Serbia) Ana Ivanovic

The following pair received entry as alternates:

- (Japan) Nao Hibino / (United Kingdom) Emily Webley-Smith

=== Withdrawals ===
Before the tournament

- (Belgium) Elise Mertens (right hand injury)
- (Luxembourg) Mandy Minella (right arm injury)
