= 2016 Mallorca Open – Doubles =

Doubles
- 2016 Mallorca Open

Final
- Champions: (Canada) Gabriela Dabrowski (Spain) María José Martínez Sánchez
- Runners-up: (Germany) Anna-Lena Friedsam (Germany) Laura Siegemund
- Score: 6–4, 6–2

Details
- Draw: 16
- Seeds: 4

Events
Singles	Doubles
Mallorca Open	· 2017 →

This was the first edition of the tournament. Gabriela Dabrowski and María José Martínez Sánchez won the title, defeating Anna-Lena Friedsam and Laura Siegemund in the final, 6–4, 6–2.

== Seeds ==
1. (United States) Raquel Atawo / (United States) Abigail Spears (quarterfinals)
2. (Spain) Anabel Medina Garrigues / (Spain) Arantxa Parra Santonja (first round)
3. (Japan) Eri Hozumi / (Japan) Miyu Kato (quarterfinals)
4. (Canada) Gabriela Dabrowski / (Spain) María José Martínez Sánchez (champions)

== Draw ==
Key

- Q = Qualifier
- WC = Wild card
- LL = Lucky loser
- Alt = Alternate
- ITF = ITF entry
- PR = Protected ranking
- SR = Special ranking
- SE = Special exempt
- JE = Junior exempt
- JR = Junior Accelerator Programme entrant
- CO = College Accelerator Programme entrant
- NG = Next Gen Accelerator Program entrant
- w/o = Walkover
- r = Retired
- d = Defaulted

=== Draw ===
First round
1	(United States) R Atawo (United States) A Spears	3	6	[10]
(Germany) A-L Grönefeld (Czech Republic) L Kunčíková	6	3	[3]
(Germany) A-L Friedsam (Germany) L Siegemund	6	7^{7}
(Chinese Taipei) C-w Chan (United States) A Muhammad	4	6^{0}
3	(Japan) E Hozumi (Japan) M Kato	6	4	[10]
(Australia) J Moore (Thailand) V Wongteanchai	1	6	[8]
(Russia) V Ivakhnenko (Russia) M Melnikova	1	7^{7}	[7]
WC	(Belgium) K Flipkens (Serbia) A Ivanovic	6	6^{5}	[10]
WC	(Canada) E Bouchard (Germany) S Lisicki	6^{4}	6	[15]
(Serbia) J Janković (Bulgaria) A Naydenova	7^{7}	4	[17]
(Switzerland) V Golubic (Belgium) E Mertens
4	(Canada) G Dabrowski (Spain) MJ Martínez Sánchez	w/o
Alt	(Japan) N Hibino (United Kingdom) E Webley-Smith	5	0
(Netherlands) D Schuurs (Czech Republic) R Voráčová	7	6
(Switzerland) X Knoll (Montenegro) D Kovinić	1	6	[10]
2	(Spain) A Medina Garrigues (Spain) A Parra Santonja	6	3	[7]

Quarterfinals
1	(United States) R Atawo (United States) A Spears	4	4
(Germany) A-L Friedsam (Germany) L Siegemund	6	6
3	(Japan) E Hozumi (Japan) M Kato	3	3
WC	(Belgium) K Flipkens (Serbia) A Ivanovic	6	6
(Serbia) J Janković (Bulgaria) A Naydenova	2	3
4	(Canada) G Dabrowski (Spain) MJ Martínez Sánchez	6	6
(Netherlands) D Schuurs (Czech Republic) R Voráčová	6	6
(Switzerland) X Knoll (Montenegro) D Kovinić	4	4

Semifinals
(Germany) A-L Friedsam (Germany) L Siegemund	5	6	[10]
WC	(Belgium) K Flipkens (Serbia) A Ivanovic	7	1	[8]
4	(Canada) G Dabrowski (Spain) MJ Martínez Sánchez	6	6
(Netherlands) D Schuurs (Czech Republic) R Voráčová	2	1

Final
(Germany) A-L Friedsam (Germany) L Siegemund	4	2
4	(Canada) G Dabrowski (Spain) MJ Martínez Sánchez	6	6
