= 2016 Mallorca Open – Singles =

Singles
- 2016 Mallorca Open

Final
- Champion: (France) Caroline Garcia
- Runner-up: (Latvia) Anastasija Sevastova
- Score: 6–3, 6–4

Details
- Draw: 32
- Seeds: 8

Events
Singles	Doubles
- Mallorca Open

This was the first edition of the tournament.

Caroline Garcia won the title, defeating Anastasija Sevastova in the final, 6–3, 6–4. It was her third WTA Tour title and first on grass courts.

== Seeds ==
1. (Spain) Garbiñe Muguruza (first round)
2. (Serbia) Jelena Janković (semifinals)
3. (Serbia) Ana Ivanovic (quarterfinals)
4. (France) Kristina Mladenovic (first round)
5. (Kazakhstan) Yulia Putintseva (first round)
6. (France) Caroline Garcia (champion)
7. (Germany) Laura Siegemund (second round)
8. (Canada) Eugenie Bouchard (second round)

== Draw ==
Key

- Q = Qualifier
- WC = Wild card
- LL = Lucky loser
- Alt = Alternate
- ITF = ITF entry
- PR = Protected ranking
- SR = Special ranking
- SE = Special exempt
- JE = Junior exempt
- JR = Junior Accelerator Programme entrant
- CO = College Accelerator Programme entrant
- NG = Next Gen Accelerator Program entrant
- w/o = Walkover
- r = Retired
- d = Defaulted

=== Finals ===
Semifinals
(Belgium) Kirsten Flipkens	4	6	1
6	(France) Caroline Garcia	6	4	6
(Latvia) Anastasija Sevastova	4	6	6
2	(Serbia) Jelena Janković	6	1	2

Final
6	(France) Caroline Garcia	6	6
(Latvia) Anastasija Sevastova	3	4

=== Top half ===
First round
1	(Spain) G Muguruza	3	4
(Belgium) K Flipkens	6	6
(Germany) J Görges	4	5
(Puerto Rico) M Puig	6	7
(China) S Zheng	4	3
Q	(Paraguay) V Cepede Royg	6	6
(Japan) N Hibino	6^{1}	4
7	(Germany) L Siegemund	7^{7}	6
3	(Serbia) A Ivanovic	6	6
(France) P Parmentier	4	4
WC	(Spain) S Sorribes Tormo	6	7
WC	(Spain) P Badosa Gibert	3	5
Q	(Romania) A Bogdan	1	4
(Germany) A-L Friedsam	6	6
(Germany) C Witthöft	5	4
6	(France) C Garcia	7	6

Second round
(Belgium) K Flipkens	6	6
(Puerto Rico) M Puig	3	4
Q	(Paraguay) V Cepede Royg	7^{7}	3	7
7	(Germany) L Siegemund	6^{5}	6	5
3	(Serbia) A Ivanovic	6	6
WC	(Spain) S Sorribes Tormo	1	0
(Germany) A-L Friedsam	4	6^{8}
6	(France) C Garcia	6	7^{10}

Quarterfinals
(Belgium) K Flipkens	7	6
Q	(Paraguay) V Cepede Royg	5	3
3	(Serbia) A Ivanovic	6^{9}	7	3
6	(France) C Garcia	7^{11}	5	6

Semifinals
(Belgium) K Flipkens	4	6	1
6	(France) C Garcia	6	4	6

=== Bottom half ===
First round
8	(Canada) E Bouchard	6	7
(Montenegro) D Kovinić	3	5
(Latvia) A Sevastova	6	6
(Switzerland) S Vögele	0	2
(Belgium) A Van Uytvanck	6	3	4
(Colombia) M Duque Mariño	3	6	6
(Germany) S Lisicki	6	6
4	(France) K Mladenovic	4	4
5	(Kazakhstan) Y Putintseva	3	2
Q	(Romania) S Cîrstea	6	6
WC	(Slovakia) D Hantuchová	6	6
(Kazakhstan) Y Shvedova	1	3
(Italy) F Schiavone	1	6	1
Q	(Belgium) E Mertens	6	3	6
(Croatia) A Konjuh	5	3
2	(Serbia) J Janković	7	6

Second round
8	(Canada) E Bouchard	3	3
(Latvia) A Sevastova	6	6
(Colombia) M Duque Mariño	1	6	6
(Germany) S Lisicki	6	3	4
Q	(Romania) S Cîrstea	6	6
WC	(Slovakia) D Hantuchová	3	4
Q	(Belgium) E Mertens	6	4	3
2	(Serbia) J Janković	0	6	6

Quarterfinals
(Latvia) A Sevastova	6	3	6
(Colombia) M Duque Mariño	4	6	3
Q	(Romania) S Cîrstea	3	3
2	(Serbia) J Janković	6	6

Semifinals
(Latvia) A Sevastova	4	6	6
2	(Serbia) J Janković	6	1	2

== Qualifying ==
=== Seeds ===
1. (United States) Shelby Rogers (first round)
2. (Romania) Sorana Cîrstea (qualified)
3. (Romania) Patricia Maria Țig (first round)
4. (Ukraine) Kateryna Kozlova (qualifying competition)
5. (Switzerland) Viktorija Golubic (first round)
6. (Japan) Risa Ozaki (first round)
7. (New Zealand) Marina Erakovic (second round)
8. (Spain) Sílvia Soler Espinosa (second round)

=== Qualifiers ===
1. (Belgium) Elise Mertens
2. (Romania) Sorana Cîrstea
3. (Paraguay) Verónica Cepede Royg
4. (Romania) Ana Bogdan

=== Draw ===
==== First qualifier ====
First round
1	(United States) Shelby Rogers	6^{7}	4
(Belgium) Elise Mertens	7^{9}	6
(France) Shérazad Reix	4	4
(United States) Asia Muhammad	6	6
WC	(Austria) Marlies Szupper	1	2
(Japan) Eri Hozumi	6	6
(Poland) Urszula Radwańska	3	2
7	(New Zealand) Marina Erakovic	6	6

Second round
(Belgium) Elise Mertens	6	7
(United States) Asia Muhammad	4	5
(Japan) Eri Hozumi	6	3	6
7	(New Zealand) Marina Erakovic	3	6	2

Qualifying competition
(Belgium) Elise Mertens	6	6
(Japan) Eri Hozumi	1	2

==== Second qualifier ====
First round
2	(Romania) Sorana Cîrstea	6	6
(Russia) Valentyna Ivakhnenko	3	0
(Bulgaria) Sesil Karatantcheva	6	6
WC	(Spain) Olga Parres Azcoitia	4	0
(Australia) Jessica Moore	7^{7}	1	4
(Luxembourg) Mandy Minella	6^{4}	6	6
(United States) Jennifer Brady	6	6
6	(Japan) Risa Ozaki	2	2

Second round
2	(Romania) Sorana Cîrstea	6	6
(Bulgaria) Sesil Karatantcheva	3	4
(Luxembourg) Mandy Minella	6	6^{5}	6
(United States) Jennifer Brady	4	7^{7}	3

Qualifying competition
2	(Romania) Sorana Cîrstea	6	6
(Luxembourg) Mandy Minella	3	2

==== Third qualifier ====
First round
3	(Romania) Patricia Maria Țig	2	0
(Thailand) Varatchaya Wongteanchai	6	6
(Japan) Miyu Kato	4	3
(Israel) Julia Glushko	6	6
(Czech Republic) Renata Voráčová	6^{3}	0
(Paraguay) Verónica Cepede Royg	7^{7}	6
(United States) Grace Min	6	7^{7}
5	(Switzerland) Viktorija Golubic	1	6^{4}

Second round
(Thailand) Varatchaya Wongteanchai	2	3
(Israel) Julia Glushko	6	6
(Paraguay) Verónica Cepede Royg	6	6
(United States) Grace Min	4	2

Qualifying competition
(Israel) Julia Glushko	0	3
(Paraguay) Verónica Cepede Royg	6	6

==== Fourth qualifier ====
First round
4	(Ukraine) Kateryna Kozlova	2	7	6
(Switzerland) Amra Sadiković	6	5	2
WC	(United Kingdom) Emily Webley-Smith	0	2
(United States) Julia Boserup	6	6
(Romania) Ana Bogdan	6	6
WC	(Spain) Yvonne Cavallé Reimers	1	2
(Bulgaria) Aleksandrina Naydenova	2	6	2
8	(Spain) Sílvia Soler Espinosa	6	4	6

Second round
4	(Ukraine) Kateryna Kozlova	6	6
(United States) Julia Boserup	1	4
(Romania) Ana Bogdan	6	6
8	(Spain) Sílvia Soler Espinosa	4	3

Qualifying competition
4	(Ukraine) Kateryna Kozlova	6^{4}	0
(Romania) Ana Bogdan	7^{7}	6
