= 2015 Rogers Cup – Men's singles =

Men's singles
- 2015 Rogers Cup

Final
- Champion: (United Kingdom) Andy Murray
- Runner-up: (Serbia) Novak Djokovic
- Score: 6–4, 4–6, 6–3

Events
Singles	men	women
Doubles	men	women
← 2014 ·	Rogers Cup	· 2016 →

Andy Murray defeated Novak Djokovic in the final, 6–4, 4–6, 6–3, to win the men's singles tennis title at the 2015 Canadian Open. It was Murray's first win against Djokovic since the 2013 Wimbledon final, having lost eight consecutive matches to him in that span.

Jo-Wilfried Tsonga was the defending champion, but lost in the quarterfinals to Murray.

== Seeds ==
The top eight seeds received a bye into the second round.

1. (Serbia) Novak Djokovic (final)
2. (United Kingdom) Andy Murray (champion)
3. (Switzerland) Stan Wawrinka (second round, retired because of a back injury)
4. (Japan) Kei Nishikori (semifinals)
5. (Czech Republic) Tomáš Berdych (second round)
6. (Croatia) Marin Čilić (second round)
7. (Spain) Rafael Nadal (quarterfinals)
8. (Canada) Milos Raonic (second round)

9. (France) Gilles Simon (second round)
10. (France) Jo-Wilfried Tsonga (quarterfinals)
11. (France) ~~Richard Gasquet~~ (withdrew due to an illness)
12. (South Africa) Kevin Anderson (first round)
13. (Belgium) David Goffin (third round)
14. (Bulgaria) Grigor Dimitrov (second round)
15. (France) Gaël Monfils (second round)
16. (United States) John Isner (quarterfinals)

Click on the seed number of a player to go to their draw section.

== Draw ==
=== Key ===
- Q = Qualifier
- WC = Wild card
- LL = Lucky loser
- Alt = Alternate
- SE = Special exempt
- PR = Protected ranking
- ITF = ITF entry
- JE = Junior exempt
- w/o = Walkover
- r = Retired
- d = Defaulted
- SR = Special ranking

=== Finals ===
Quarterfinals
1	(Serbia) Novak Djokovic	5	7^{9}	6
Q	(Latvia) Ernests Gulbis	7	6^{7}	1
16	(United States) John Isner	7^{11}	6^{13}	6^{4}
(France) Jérémy Chardy	6^{9}	7^{15}	7^{7}
7	(Spain) Rafael Nadal	2	4
4	(Japan) Kei Nishikori	6	6
10	(France) Jo-Wilfried Tsonga	4	4
2	(United Kingdom) Andy Murray	6	6

Semifinals
1	(Serbia) Novak Djokovic	6	6
(France) Jérémy Chardy	4	4
4	(Japan) Kei Nishikori	3	0
2	(United Kingdom) Andy Murray	6	6

Final
1	(Serbia) Novak Djokovic	4	6	3
2	(United Kingdom) Andy Murray	6	4	6

=== Top half ===
==== Section 1 ====
First round
(Brazil) T Bellucci	7^{7}	4	7^{7}
(Uruguay) P Cuevas	6^{4}	6	6^{4}
(United States) J Sock	6	2	7^{7}
(France) A Mannarino	2	6	6^{5}
Q	(Ukraine) A Dolgopolov	4	5
14	(Bulgaria) G Dimitrov	6	7
12	(South Africa) K Anderson	6^{2}	6^{4}
(Czech Republic) L Rosol	7^{7}	7^{7}
Q	(Latvia) E Gulbis	3	7^{10}	6
(Austria) D Thiem	6	6^{8}	1
Q	(United States) D Kudla	3	4
Q	(United States) D Young	6	6

Second round
1	(Serbia) N Djokovic	6	7^{7}
(Brazil) T Bellucci	3	6^{4}
(United States) J Sock	5	7^{7}	7
14	(Bulgaria) G Dimitrov	7	6^{5}	5
(Czech Republic) L Rosol	2	7	3
Q	(Latvia) E Gulbis	6	5	6
Q	(United States) D Young	7^{7}	6
5	(Czech Republic) T Berdych	6^{5}	3

Third round
1	(Serbia) N Djokovic	6	6
(United States) J Sock	2	1
Q	(Latvia) E Gulbis	6	6
Q	(United States) D Young	4	4

Quarterfinals
1	(Serbia) N Djokovic	5	7^{9}	6
Q	(Latvia) E Gulbis	7	6^{7}	1

==== Section 2 ====
First round
(Spain) F Verdasco	3	6	4
(Australia) N Kyrgios	6	4	6
WC	(Canada) V Pospisil	6	6
Q	(Chinese Taipei) Y-h Lu	4	3
(Germany) B Becker	4	7^{8}	3
16	(United States) J Isner	6	6^{6}	6
LL	(France) N Mahut	1	5
(France) J Chardy	6	7
Q	(South Korea) H Chung	3	4
(Argentina) L Mayer	6	6
(Poland) J Janowicz	4	6^{6}
(Croatia) I Karlović	6	7^{8}

Second round
3	(Switzerland) S Wawrinka	7^{10}	3	0^{r}
(Australia) N Kyrgios	6^{8}	6	4
WC	(Canada) V Pospisil	6^{1}	6	3
16	(United States) J Isner	7^{7}	4	6
(France) J Chardy	4	7^{7}	6
(Argentina) L Mayer	6	6^{4}	2
(Croatia) I Karlović	7^{7}	7^{7}
8	(Canada) M Raonic	6^{1}	6^{1}

Third round
(Australia) N Kyrgios	5	3
16	(United States) J Isner	7	6
(France) J Chardy	4	7^{7}	6
(Croatia) I Karlović	6	6^{1}	4

Quarterfinals
16	(United States) J Isner	7^{11}	6^{13}	6^{4}
(France) J Chardy	6^{9}	7^{15}	7^{7}

=== Bottom half ===
==== Section 3 ====
First round
(Ukraine) S Stakhovsky	6	5	6
WC	(Canada) F Peliwo	1	7	2
(Serbia) V Troicki	3	5
Q	(Russia) M Youzhny	6	7
(Italy) A Seppi	2	4
9	(France) G Simon	6	6
13	(Belgium) D Goffin	6	6
(United States) S Johnson	2	2
(United States) S Querrey	6	6
(Slovakia) M Kližan	3	3
WC	(Canada) F Dancevic	2	4
(Spain) P Andújar	6	6

Second round
7	(Spain) R Nadal	7^{7}	6
(Ukraine) S Stakhovsky	6^{4}	3
Q	(Russia) M Youzhny	6	6
9	(France) G Simon	1	4
13	(Belgium) D Goffin	6	6
(United States) S Querrey	4	4
(Spain) P Andújar	3	3
4	(Japan) K Nishikori	6	6

Third round
7	(Spain) R Nadal	6	6
Q	(Russia) M Youzhny	3	3
13	(Belgium) D Goffin	4	4
4	(Japan) K Nishikori	6	6

Quarterfinals
7	(Spain) R Nadal	2	4
4	(Japan) K Nishikori	6	6

==== Section 4 ====
First round
(Portugal) J Sousa	3	3
(Australia) B Tomic	6	6
(Spain) R Bautista Agut	6	6
PR	(Serbia) J Tipsarević	3	4
(Croatia) B Ćorić	4	4
10	(France) J-W Tsonga	6	6
15	(France) G Monfils	6	6
(Italy) F Fognini	3	1
WC	(Canada) P Bester	2	3
(Luxembourg) G Müller	6	6
(Spain) F López	3	6	3
(Spain) T Robredo	6	3	6

Second round
6	(Croatia) M Čilić	3	4
(Australia) B Tomic	6	6
(Spain) R Bautista Agut	7	6^{6}	5
10	(France) J-W Tsonga	5	7^{8}	7
15	(France) G Monfils	3	6	6^{4}
(Luxembourg) G Müller	6	3	7^{7}
(Spain) T Robredo	4	5
2	(United Kingdom) A Murray	6	7

Third round
(Australia) B Tomic	6^{7}	3
10	(France) J-W Tsonga	7^{9}	6
(Luxembourg) G Müller	3	2
2	(United Kingdom) A Murray	6	6

Quarterfinals
10	(France) J-W Tsonga	4	4
2	(United Kingdom) A Murray	6	6

== Qualifying ==
=== Seeds ===
1. (France) Nicolas Mahut (qualifying competition, lucky loser)
2. (Australia) Thanasi Kokkinakis (first round)
3. (Ukraine) Alexandr Dolgopolov (qualified)
4. (United States) Donald Young (qualified)
5. (Chinese Taipei) Lu Yen-hsun (qualified)
6. (South Korea) Chung Hyeon (qualified)
7. (United States) Denis Kudla (qualified)
8. (United States) Tim Smyczek (first round)
9. (Latvia) Ernests Gulbis (qualified)
10. (United States) Rajeev Ram (qualifying competition)
11. (Australia) James Duckworth (qualifying competition)
12. (Belgium) Ruben Bemelmans (first round)
13. (Russia) Mikhail Youzhny (qualified)
14. (United Kingdom) James Ward (first round)

=== Qualifiers ===
1. (Latvia) Ernests Gulbis
2. (Russia) Mikhail Youzhny
3. (Ukraine) Alexandr Dolgopolov
4. (United States) Donald Young
5. (Chinese Taipei) Lu Yen-hsun
6. (South Korea) Chung Hyeon
7. (United States) Denis Kudla

=== Lucky losers ===
1. (France) Nicolas Mahut

=== Qualifying draw ===
==== First qualifier ====
First round
1	(France) Nicolas Mahut	6	7
Alt	(Canada) Isade Juneau	1	5
(Slovenia) Blaž Rola	4	3
9/WC	(Latvia) Ernests Gulbis	6	6

Qualifying competition
1	(France) Nicolas Mahut	7^{9}	5	3
9/WC	(Latvia) Ernests Gulbis	6^{7}	7	6

==== Second qualifier ====
First round
2	(Australia) Thanasi Kokkinakis	5	7^{7}	6^{5}
Alt	(France) Pierre-Hugues Herbert	7	6^{4}	7^{7}
(Australia) John-Patrick Smith	1	6^{6}
13	(Russia) Mikhail Youzhny	6	7^{8}

Qualifying competition
Alt	(France) Pierre-Hugues Herbert	4	3
13	(Russia) Mikhail Youzhny	6	6

==== Third qualifier ====
First round
3	(Ukraine) Alexandr Dolgopolov	6	3	7^{7}
(Israel) Dudi Sela	2	6	6^{2}
(Colombia) Alejandro Falla	6	6
14	(United Kingdom) James Ward	2	4

Qualifying competition
3	(Ukraine) Alexandr Dolgopolov	6^{5}	6	6
(Colombia) Alejandro Falla	7^{7}	3	3

==== Fourth qualifier ====
First round
4	(United States) Donald Young	2	6	6
Alt	(France) Édouard Roger-Vasselin	6	3	3
WC	(Canada) Peter Polansky	6^{4}	6^{5}
10	(United States) Rajeev Ram	7^{7}	7^{7}

Qualifying competition
4	(United States) Donald Young	6	6
10	(United States) Rajeev Ram	3	1

==== Fifth qualifier ====
First round
5	(Chinese Taipei) Lu Yen-hsun	6	6
WC	(Canada) David Volfson	1	1
WC	(Canada) Brayden Schnur	6	6
12	(Belgium) Ruben Bemelmans	4	3

Qualifying competition
5	(Chinese Taipei) Lu Yen-hsun	6	6
WC	(Canada) Brayden Schnur	0	1

==== Sixth qualifier ====
First round
6	(South Korea) Chung Hyeon	6	6
Alt	(Canada) Kelsey Stevenson	2	1
(Colombia) Alejandro González	6	7
8	(United States) Tim Smyczek	2	5

Qualifying competition
6	(South Korea) Chung Hyeon	6	6
(Colombia) Alejandro González	2	1

==== Seventh qualifier ====
First round
7	(United States) Denis Kudla	6	6
(United States) Ryan Harrison	4	2
(Ukraine) Illya Marchenko	3	5
11	(Australia) James Duckworth	6	7

Qualifying competition
7	(United States) Denis Kudla	6	6
11	(Australia) James Duckworth	4	1
