= 2015 Rogers Cup – Men's doubles =

Men's doubles
- 2015 Rogers Cup

Final
- Champions: (United States) Bob Bryan (United States) Mike Bryan
- Runners-up: (Canada) Daniel Nestor (France) Édouard Roger-Vasselin
- Score: 7–6^{(7–5)}, 3–6, [10–6]

Details
- Draw: 28
- Seeds: 8

Events
Singles	men	women
Doubles	men	women
- Rogers Cup

Alexander Peya and Bruno Soares were the two-time defending champions, but lost in the semifinals to Bob and Mike Bryan.
The Bryan brothers went on to win the title, defeating Daniel Nestor and Édouard Roger-Vasselin in the final, 7–6^{(7–5)}, 3–6, [10–6].

== Seeds ==
All seeds received a bye into the second round.

1. (United States) Bob Bryan / (United States) Mike Bryan (champions)
2. (Croatia) Ivan Dodig / (Brazil) Marcelo Melo (second round)
3. (Netherlands) Jean-Julien Rojer / (Romania) Horia Tecău (quarterfinals)
4. (India) Rohan Bopanna / (Romania) Florin Mergea (second round)
5. (Poland) Marcin Matkowski / (Serbia) Nenad Zimonjić (quarterfinals)
6. (Austria) Alexander Peya / (Brazil) Bruno Soares (semifinals)
7. (United Kingdom) Jamie Murray / (Australia) John Peers (quarterfinals)
8. (France) Pierre-Hugues Herbert / (France) Nicolas Mahut (second round)

== Draw ==
Key

- Q = Qualifier
- WC = Wild card
- LL = Lucky loser
- Alt = Alternate
- ITF = ITF entry
- PR = Protected ranking
- SR = Special ranking
- SE = Special exempt
- JE = Junior exempt
- JR = Junior Accelerator Programme entrant
- CO = College Accelerator Programme entrant
- NG = Next Gen Accelerator Program entrant
- w/o = Walkover
- r = Retired
- d = Defaulted

=== Finals ===
Semifinals
1	(United States) Bob Bryan (United States) Mike Bryan	6^{7}	6	[10]
6	(Austria) Alexander Peya (Brazil) Bruno Soares	7^{9}	4	[6]
PR	(Serbia) Novak Djokovic (Serbia) Janko Tipsarević	6	1	[4]
(Canada) Daniel Nestor (France) Édouard Roger-Vasselin	3	6	[10]

Final
1	(United States) Bob Bryan (United States) Mike Bryan	7^{7}	3	[10]
(Canada) Daniel Nestor (France) Édouard Roger-Vasselin	6^{5}	6	[6]

=== Top half ===
First round
(Spain) F López (Belarus) M Mirnyi	6	1	[10]
(Belgium) D Goffin (Austria) D Thiem	3	6	[8]
(Spain) R Nadal (Spain) F Verdasco	6	5	[10]
(Czech Republic) T Berdych (United States) J Sock	3	7	[6]
(Italy) F Fognini (Spain) T Robredo	6	7
(South Africa) R Klaasen (United States) R Ram	2	5
(Croatia) M Čilić (Sweden) R Lindstedt	6	6
WC	(Canada) P Bester (Canada) A Shamasdin	3	4

Second round
1	(United States) B Bryan (United States) M Bryan	7	6
(Spain) F López (Belarus) M Mirnyi	5	4
(Spain) R Nadal (Spain) F Verdasco	7^{10}	6^{2}	[10]
8	(France) P-H Herbert (France) N Mahut	6^{8}	7^{7}	[4]
3	(Netherlands) J-J Rojer (Romania) H Tecău	7^{7}	6
(Italy) F Fognini (Spain) T Robredo	6^{4}	3
(Croatia) M Čilić (Sweden) R Lindstedt	5	4
6	(Austria) A Peya (Brazil) B Soares	7	6

Quarterfinals
1	(United States) B Bryan (United States) M Bryan	6	6^{5}	[10]
(Spain) R Nadal (Spain) F Verdasco	3	7^{7}	[8]
3	(Netherlands) J-J Rojer (Romania) H Tecău	2	4
6	(Austria) A Peya (Brazil) B Soares	6	6

Semifinals
1	(United States) B Bryan (United States) M Bryan	6^{7}	6	[10]
6	(Austria) A Peya (Brazil) B Soares	7^{9}	4	[7]

=== Bottom half ===
First round
(South Africa) K Anderson (France) J Chardy	3	1
(United Kingdom) A Murray (India) L Paes	6	6
PR	(Serbia) N Djokovic (Serbia) J Tipsarević	6	6
(Italy) A Seppi (Serbia) V Troicki	4	3
WC	(Australia) L Hewitt (Australia) N Kyrgios	5	4
(France) G Monfils (France) J-W Tsonga	7	6
(Uruguay) P Cuevas (Spain) D Marrero	3	7	[5]
(Canada) D Nestor (France) É Roger-Vasselin	6	5	[10]

Second round
7	(United Kingdom) J Murray (Australia) J Peers	6	7^{11}
(United Kingdom) A Murray (India) L Paes	4	6^{9}
PR	(Serbia) N Djokovic (Serbia) J Tipsarević	6	5	[10]
4	(India) R Bopanna (Romania) F Mergea	3	7	[3]
5	(Poland) M Matkowski (Serbia) N Zimonjić	7	7
(France) G Monfils (France) J-W Tsonga	5	5
(Canada) D Nestor (France) É Roger-Vasselin	6	6
2	(Croatia) I Dodig (Brazil) M Melo	4	2

Quarterfinals
7	(United Kingdom) J Murray (Australia) J Peers	3	7^{7}	[7]
PR	(Serbia) N Djokovic (Serbia) J Tipsarević	6	6^{5}	[10]
5	(Poland) M Matkowski (Serbia) N Zimonjić	4	2
(Canada) D Nestor (France) É Roger-Vasselin	6	6

Semifinals
PR	(Serbia) N Djokovic (Serbia) J Tipsarević	6	1	[4]
(Canada) D Nestor (France) É Roger-Vasselin	3	6	[10]
