= 2017 Wuhan Open – Singles =

Singles
- 2017 Wuhan Open

Final
- Champion: (France) Caroline Garcia
- Runner-up: (Australia) Ashleigh Barty
- Score: 6–7^{(3–7)}, 7–6^{(7–4)}, 6–2

Details
- Draw: 56
- Seeds: 16

Events
Singles	Doubles
- Wuhan Open

Caroline Garcia defeated Ashleigh Barty in the final, 6–7^{(3–7)}, 7–6^{(7–4)}, 6–2 to win the singles tennis title at the 2017 Wuhan Open. It was the fourth WTA Tour singles title of her career.

Petra Kvitová was the defending champion, but lost in the first round to Peng Shuai.

Garbiñe Muguruza retained the WTA no. 1 singles ranking after Simona Halep and Karolína Plíšková lost in the second round and quarterfinals, respectively.

== Seeds ==
The top eight seeds received a bye into the second round.

1. (Spain) Garbiñe Muguruza (quarterfinals)
2. (Romania) Simona Halep (second round)
3. (Czech Republic) Karolína Plíšková (quarterfinals)
4. (Denmark) Caroline Wozniacki (second round)
5. (United Kingdom) Johanna Konta (second round)
6. (Russia) Svetlana Kuznetsova (second round)
7. (Slovakia) Dominika Cibulková (third round)
8. (Latvia) Jeļena Ostapenko (semifinals)

9. (Poland) Agnieszka Radwańska (third round)
10. (United States) Madison Keys (first round)
11. (Czech Republic) Petra Kvitová (first round)
12. (Germany) Angelique Kerber (first round)
13. (France) Kristina Mladenovic (first round)
14. (United States) Sloane Stephens (first round)
15. (Latvia) Anastasija Sevastova (first round)
16. (Russia) Elena Vesnina (third round)

Click on the seed number of a player to go to their draw section.

== Draw ==
Key

- Q = Qualifier
- WC = Wild card
- LL = Lucky loser
- Alt = Alternate
- ITF = ITF entry
- PR = Protected ranking
- SR = Special ranking
- SE = Special exempt
- JE = Junior exempt
- JR = Junior Accelerator Programme entrant
- CO = College Accelerator Programme entrant
- NG = Next Gen Accelerator Program entrant
- w/o = Walkover
- r = Retired
- d = Defaulted

=== Finals ===
Quarterfinals
1	(Spain) Garbiñe Muguruza	6	3	2
8	(Latvia) Jeļena Ostapenko	1	6	6
3	(Czech Republic) Karolína Plíšková	6	6^{3}	6^{2}
(Australia) Ashleigh Barty	4	7^{7}	7^{7}
(France) Alizé Cornet	6^{2}	5
Q	(Greece) Maria Sakkari	7^{7}	7
(France) Caroline Garcia	7^{7}	6
(Russia) Ekaterina Makarova	6^{3}	4

Semifinals
8	(Latvia) Jeļena Ostapenko	3	0
(Australia) Ashleigh Barty	6	6
Q	(Greece) Maria Sakkari	3	2
(France) Caroline Garcia	6	6

Final
(Australia) Ashleigh Barty	7^{7}	6^{4}	2
(France) Caroline Garcia	6^{3}	7^{7}	6

=== Top half ===
==== Section 1 ====
First round
(Spain) C Suárez Navarro	3	6^{12}
(Ukraine) L Tsurenko	6	7^{14}
Q	(Poland) M Linette	7	6
(Estonia) A Kontaveit	5	4
(Czech Republic) K Siniaková	6	6
13	(France) K Mladenovic	3	2
11	(Czech Republic) P Kvitová	6^{7}	7^{7}	6^{3}
(China) S Peng	7^{9}	6^{5}	7^{7}
Q	(Puerto Rico) M Puig	6	6^{0}	6
(Germany) M Barthel	0	7^{7}	4
Q	(Tunisia) O Jabeur	1	3
(Czech Republic) B Strýcová	6	6

Second round
1	(Spain) G Muguruza	6	6
(Ukraine) L Tsurenko	4	4
Q	(Poland) M Linette	6	6
(Czech Republic) K Siniaková	1	2
(China) S Peng	6	3	4
Q	(Puerto Rico) M Puig	4	6	6
(Czech Republic) B Strýcová	6	5	3
8	(Latvia) J Ostapenko	2	7	6

Third round
1	(Spain) G Muguruza	6	1	6
Q	(Poland) M Linette	2	6	4
Q	(Puerto Rico) M Puig	2	6	3
8	(Latvia) J Ostapenko	6	3	6

Quarterfinals
1	(Spain) G Muguruza	6	3	2
8	(Latvia) J Ostapenko	1	6	6

==== Section 2 ====
First round
(China) S Zhang	7	5	6
(Croatia) D Vekić	5	7	1
WC	(China) Y Wang	3	3
(Romania) S Cîrstea	6	6
(China) Q Wang	6	6
14/PR	(United States) S Stephens	2	2
9	(Poland) A Radwańska	6	7
(Slovakia) M Rybáriková	4	5
(Australia) D Gavrilova	4	6	4
(Germany) J Görges	6	1	6
(United States) C Bellis	5	0
(Australia) A Barty	7	6

Second round
3	(Czech Republic) Ka Plíšková	6	3	6
(China) S Zhang	4	6	4
(Romania) S Cîrstea	3	3
(China) Q Wang	6	6
9	(Poland) A Radwańska	7	7
(Germany) J Görges	5	5
(Australia) A Barty	6	4	7^{7}
5	(United Kingdom) J Konta	0	6	6^{3}

Third round
3	(Czech Republic) Ka Plíšková	6	6
(China) Q Wang	2	1
9	(Poland) A Radwańska	6	0	4
(Australia) A Barty	4	6	6

Quarterfinals
3	(Czech Republic) Ka Plíšková	6	6^{3}	6^{2}
(Australia) A Barty	4	7^{7}	7^{7}

=== Bottom half ===
==== Section 3 ====
First round
(Russia) A Pavlyuchenkova	3	2
(France) A Cornet	6	6
(Netherlands) K Bertens	6	6
Q	(Romania) M Niculescu	2	1
Q	(United States) V Lepchenko	6	7^{7}
10	(United States) M Keys	2	6^{4}
16	(Russia) E Vesnina	6	6
WC	(China) Y Duan	3	4
(Belgium) E Mertens	6	1	6
(Japan) N Osaka	4	6	4
Q	(Greece) M Sakkari	1	6	6
(Kazakhstan) Y Putintseva	6	4	2

Second round
6	(Russia) S Kuznetsova	3	3
(France) A Cornet	6	6
(Netherlands) K Bertens	4	4
Q	(United States) V Lepchenko	6	6
16	(Russia) E Vesnina	6	6
(Belgium) E Mertens	2	4
Q	(Greece) M Sakkari	7	6
4	(Denmark) C Wozniacki	5	3

Third round
(France) A Cornet	3	6	6
Q	(United States) V Lepchenko	6	4	2
16	(Russia) E Vesnina	6^{6}	5
Q	(Greece) M Sakkari	7^{8}	7

Quarterfinals
(France) A Cornet	6^{2}	5
Q	(Greece) M Sakkari	7^{7}	7

==== Section 4 ====
First round
(Australia) S Stosur	4	6	3
WC	(Switzerland) J Teichmann	6	3	6
Q	(United States) C McHale	6	6
(Italy) R Vinci	4	4
(France) C Garcia	3	6	6
12	(Germany) A Kerber	6	3	1
15	(Latvia) A Sevastova	4	2
(Russia) E Makarova	6	6
Q	(Germany) A Petkovic	3	2
(United States) L Davis	6	6
(Russia) D Kasatkina	6	2	6
(United States) A Riske	1	6	3

Second round
7	(Slovakia) D Cibulková	6	6
WC	(Switzerland) J Teichmann	2	2
Q	(United States) C McHale	1	1
(France) C Garcia	6	6
(Russia) E Makarova	6	6
(United States) L Davis	2	4
(Russia) D Kasatkina	6	6
2	(Romania) S Halep	2	1

Third round
7	(Slovakia) D Cibulková	3	5
(France) C Garcia	6	7
(Russia) E Makarova	6	6
(Russia) D Kasatkina	4	4

Quarterfinals
(France) C Garcia	7^{7}	6
(Russia) E Makarova	6^{3}	4

== Qualifying ==
=== Seeds ===
1. (Romania) Monica Niculescu (qualified)
2. (Russia) Natalia Vikhlyantseva (qualifying competition)
3. (United States) Shelby Rogers (withdrew)
4. (Spain) Lara Arruabarrena (first round)
5. (Puerto Rico) Monica Puig (qualified)
6. (Poland) Magda Linette (qualified)
7. (Germany) Carina Witthöft (qualifying competition)
8. (United Kingdom) Heather Watson (qualifying competition)
9. (United States) Varvara Lepchenko (qualified)
10. (United States) Christina McHale (qualified)
11. (Greece) Maria Sakkari (qualified)
12. (United States) Madison Brengle (first round)
13. (Belarus) Aliaksandra Sasnovich (qualifying competition)
14. (Tunisia) Ons Jabeur (qualified)
15. (Spain) Sara Sorribes Tormo (withdrew)
16. (Montenegro) Danka Kovinić (first round)
17. (Germany) Andrea Petkovic (qualified)

=== Qualifiers ===
1. (Romania) Monica Niculescu
2. (Greece) Maria Sakkari
3. (Germany) Andrea Petkovic
4. (United States) Christina McHale
5. (Puerto Rico) Monica Puig
6. (Poland) Magda Linette
7. (United States) Varvara Lepchenko
8. (Tunisia) Ons Jabeur

=== Draw ===
==== First qualifier ====
First round
1	(Romania) Monica Niculescu	6	6
(China) Lu Jiajing	2	1
(China) Liu Fangzhou	6	4
Alt	(Australia) Anastasia Rodionova	1	2^{r}

Qualifying competition
1	(Romania) Monica Niculescu	2	6	6
(China) Liu Fangzhou	6	1	0

==== Second qualifier ====
First round
2	(Russia) Natalia Vikhlyantseva	6	6
(China) Gao Xinyu	3	1
Alt	(Bulgaria) Aleksandrina Naydenova	3	0
11	(Greece) Maria Sakkari	6	6

Qualifying competition
2	(Russia) Natalia Vikhlyantseva	1	6^{2}
11	(Greece) Maria Sakkari	6	7^{7}

==== Third qualifier ====
First round
17	(Germany) Andrea Petkovic	6	6
Alt	(Canada) Gabriela Dabrowski	1	2
(China) Zhu Lin	6^{3}	4
13	(Belarus) Aliaksandra Sasnovich	7^{7}	6

Qualifying competition
17	(Germany) Andrea Petkovic	6	6
13	(Belarus) Aliaksandra Sasnovich	1	1

==== Fourth qualifier ====
First round
4	(Spain) Lara Arruabarrena	6^{3}	2
(United States) Bernarda Pera	7^{7}	6
(United States) Nicole Gibbs	1	6	3
10	(United States) Christina McHale	6	3	6

Qualifying competition
(United States) Bernarda Pera	5	0^{r}
10	(United States) Christina McHale	7	4

==== Fifth qualifier ====
First round
5	(Puerto Rico) Monica Puig	4
(Czech Republic) Lucie Hradecká	4^{r}
(Chinese Taipei) Chang Kai-chen	4	6	6
12	(United States) Madison Brengle	6	4	2

Qualifying competition
5	(Puerto Rico) Monica Puig	7^{7}	6
(Chinese Taipei) Chang Kai-chen	6^{2}	2

==== Sixth qualifier ====
First round
6	(Poland) Magda Linette	6	6
(Australia) Arina Rodionova	3	3
(China) Lu Jingjing	3	6	6
16	(Montenegro) Danka Kovinić	6	2	2

Qualifying competition
6	(Poland) Magda Linette	6^{0}	6	6
(China) Lu Jingjing	7^{7}	4	1

==== Seventh qualifier ====
First round
7	(Germany) Carina Witthöft	6	7
(Japan) Shuko Aoyama	0	5
(United States) Kristie Ahn	0	2
9	(United States) Varvara Lepchenko	6	6

Qualifying competition
7	(Germany) Carina Witthöft	1	6^{2}
9	(United States) Varvara Lepchenko	6	7^{7}

==== Eighth qualifier ====
First round
8	(United Kingdom) Heather Watson	6^{2}	6	7
(China) Han Xinyun	7^{7}	2	5
WC	(China) Guo Shanshan	1	0
14	(Tunisia) Ons Jabeur	6	6

Qualifying competition
8	(United Kingdom) Heather Watson	1	6	4
14	(Tunisia) Ons Jabeur	6	4	6
