= 2015 Rogers Cup – Women's doubles =

Rugby tournament

Women's doubles
- 2015 Rogers Cup

Final
- Champions: (United States) Bethanie Mattek-Sands (Czech Republic) Lucie Šafářová
- Runners-up: (France) Caroline Garcia (Slovenia) Katarina Srebotnik
- Score: 6–1, 6–2

Details
- Draw: 28
- Seeds: 8

Events
Singles	men	women
Doubles	men	women
- Rogers Cup

Sara Errani and Roberta Vinci were the defending champions, but chose not participate together. Errani played alongside Flavia Pennetta, but lost in the quarterfinals to Bethanie Mattek-Sands and Lucie Šafářová. Vinci teamed up with Jelena Janković, but lost in the first round to Garbiñe Muguruza and Carla Suárez Navarro.
Mattek-Sands and Šafářová went on to win the title, defeating Caroline Garcia and Katarina Srebotnik in the final, 6–1, 6–2.

== Seeds ==
The top four seeds received a bye into the second round.

1. (Switzerland) Martina Hingis / (India) Sania Mirza (semifinals)
2. (Russia) Ekaterina Makarova / (Russia) Elena Vesnina (second round, retired)
3. (United States) Bethanie Mattek-Sands / (Czech Republic) Lucie Šafářová (champions)
4. (France) Caroline Garcia / (Slovenia) Katarina Srebotnik (final)
5. (Australia) Casey Dellacqua / (Kazakhstan) Yaroslava Shvedova (first round)
6. (Italy) Sara Errani / (Italy) Flavia Pennetta (quarterfinals)
7. (Czech Republic) Andrea Hlaváčková / (Czech Republic) Lucie Hradecká (first round)
8. (Spain) Garbiñe Muguruza / (Spain) Carla Suárez Navarro (second round)

== Draw ==
Key

- Q = Qualifier
- WC = Wild card
- LL = Lucky loser
- Alt = Alternate
- ITF = ITF entry
- PR = Protected ranking
- SR = Special ranking
- SE = Special exempt
- JE = Junior exempt
- JR = Junior Accelerator Programme entrant
- CO = College Accelerator Programme entrant
- NG = Next Gen Accelerator Program entrant
- w/o = Walkover
- r = Retired
- d = Defaulted

=== Finals ===
Semifinals
1	(Switzerland) Martina Hingis (India) Sania Mirza	3	2
4	(France) Caroline Garcia (Slovenia) Katarina Srebotnik	6	6
3	(United States) Bethanie Mattek-Sands (Czech Republic) Lucie Šafářová	6	7^{7}
(France) Kristina Mladenovic (Czech Republic) Karolína Plíšková	4	6^{5}

Final
4	(France) Caroline Garcia (Slovenia) Katarina Srebotnik	1	2
3	(United States) Bethanie Mattek-Sands (Czech Republic) Lucie Šafářová	6	6

=== Top half ===
First round
(Germany) J Görges (Poland) K Jans-Ignacik	7	6
(Ukraine) L Kichenok (Ukraine) O Savchuk	5	3
(Spain) A Medina Garrigues (Spain) A Parra Santonja	3	6	[10]
(Chinese Taipei) C-j Chuang (China) C Liang	6	1	[8]
(Chinese Taipei) H-c Chan (Chinese Taipei) Y-j Chan	6	3	[10]
7	(Czech Republic) A Hlaváčková (Czech Republic) L Hradecká	4	6	[8]
(Canada) G Dabrowski (Poland) A Rosolska	5	5
WC	(Canada) F Abanda (Canada) H El Tabakh	7	7
(Romania) I-C Begu (Romania) R Olaru	6	4	[10]
(Australia) An Rodionova (Australia) Ar Rodionova	3	6	[7]
(Serbia) J Janković (Italy) R Vinci	6^{5}	0
8	(Spain) G Muguruza (Spain) C Suárez Navarro	7^{7}	6

Second round
1	(Switzerland) M Hingis (India) S Mirza	6	6
(Germany) J Görges (Poland) K Jans-Ignacik	3	2
(Spain) A Medina Garrigues (Spain) A Parra Santonja	6	2	[4]
(Chinese Taipei) H-c Chan (Chinese Taipei) Y-j Chan	4	6	[10]
4	(France) C Garcia (Slovenia) K Srebotnik	6	6
WC	(Canada) F Abanda (Canada) H El Tabakh	3	2
(Romania) I-C Begu (Romania) R Olaru	7^{7}	0	[10]
8	(Spain) G Muguruza (Spain) C Suárez Navarro	6^{5}	6	[4]

Quarterfinals
1	(Switzerland) M Hingis (India) S Mirza	6	6
(Chinese Taipei) H-c Chan (Chinese Taipei) Y-j Chan	4	2
4	(France) C Garcia (Slovenia) K Srebotnik	6	6
(Romania) I-C Begu (Romania) R Olaru	3	2

Semifinals
1	(Switzerland) M Hingis (India) S Mirza	3	2
4	(France) C Garcia (Slovenia) K Srebotnik	6	6

=== Bottom half ===
First round
6	(Italy) S Errani (Italy) F Pennetta	6	6
Alt	(Germany) M Barthel (Luxembourg) M Minella	1	3
(Spain) L Arruabarrena (Slovenia) A Klepač	1	6^{5}
WC	(Switzerland) B Bencic (Slovakia) D Cibulková	6	7^{7}
(Croatia) D Jurak (United States) R Kops-Jones	6	6
WC	(Russia) D Gavrilova (Romania) S Halep	2	3
5	(Australia) C Dellacqua (Kazakhstan) Y Shvedova	7^{7}	4	[13]
(France) K Mladenovic (Czech Republic) Ka Plíšková	6^{5}	6	[15]
(Netherlands) M Krajicek (Czech Republic) B Strýcová	6	6
(Germany) A-L Grönefeld (Croatia) A Tomljanović	4	4
(Chinese Taipei) C-w Chan (Poland) P Kania	6	4	[5]
WC	(Canada) S Fichman (Canada) C Zhao	1	6	[10]

Second round
6	(Italy) S Errani (Italy) F Pennetta	6	6
WC	(Switzerland) B Bencic (Slovakia) D Cibulková	1	3
(Croatia) D Jurak (United States) R Kops-Jones	2	2
3	(United States) B Mattek-Sands (Czech Republic) L Šafářová	6	6
(France) K Mladenovic (Czech Republic) Ka Plíšková	6	3	[10]
(Netherlands) M Krajicek (Czech Republic) B Strýcová	4	6	[8]
WC	(Canada) S Fichman (Canada) C Zhao	5
2	(Russia) E Makarova (Russia) E Vesnina	2^{r}

Quarterfinals
6	(Italy) S Errani (Italy) F Pennetta	0	6^{6}
3	(United States) B Mattek-Sands (Czech Republic) L Šafářová	6	7^{8}
(France) K Mladenovic (Czech Republic) Ka Plíšková	6	6
WC	(Canada) S Fichman (Canada) C Zhao	2	2

Semifinals
3	(United States) B Mattek-Sands (Czech Republic) L Šafářová	6	7^{7}
(France) K Mladenovic (Czech Republic) Ka Plíšková	4	6^{5}
