= 2015 Rogers Cup =

- Date: August 10–16
- Edition: 126th (men) / 114th (women)
- Category: ATP World Tour Masters 1000 (men); WTA Premier 5 (women)
- Surface: Hard / outdoor
- Location: Montreal, Canada (men); Toronto, Canada (women)

Champions

Men's singles
- (United Kingdom) Andy Murray

Women's singles
- (Switzerland) Belinda Bencic

Men's doubles
- (United States) Bob Bryan / (United States) Mike Bryan

Women's doubles
- (United States) Bethanie Mattek-Sands / (Czech Republic) Lucie Šafářová
- Canadian Open

The 2015 Rogers Cup presented by National Bank was a tennis tournament played on outdoor hard courts. It was the 126th edition (for the men) and the 114th (for the women) of the Canadian Open, and was part of the ATP World Tour Masters 1000 of the 2015 ATP World Tour, and of the WTA Premier 5 tournaments of the 2015 WTA Tour, plus is the 2015 US Open Series event. The men's event was held at the Uniprix Stadium in Montreal, from August 10 to August 16, and the women's event at the Aviva Centre in Toronto, from August 10 to August 16.

Second seed Andy Murray won the Men's singles title while Belinda Bencic won the Women's singles title.

== Points and prize money ==
=== Point distribution ===
Event	W	F	SF	QF	Round of 16	Round of 32	Round of 64	Q	Q2	Q1
Men's singles	1000	600	360	180	90	45	10	25	16	0
Men's doubles	1000	600	360	180	90	0	—N/a	—N/a	—N/a	—N/a
Women's singles	900	585	350	190	105	60	1	30	20	1
Women's doubles	900	585	350	190	105	5	—N/a	—N/a	—N/a	—N/a

=== Prize money ===
Event	W	F	SF	QF	Round of 16	Round of 32	Round of 64	Q2	Q1
Men's singles	$685,200	$336,000	$169,100	$85,985	$44,600	$23,540	$12,710	$2,930	$1,490
Women's singles	$490,200	$238,200	$119,330	$56,825	$27,375	$14,025	$7,565	$3,075	$1,860
Men's doubles	$212,200	$103,890	$52,110	$26,750	$13,830	$7,290	—N/a	—N/a	—N/a
Women's doubles	$140,230	$70,835	$35,070	$17,650	$8,950	$4,420	—N/a	—N/a	—N/a

== ATP singles main-draw entrants ==
=== Seeds ===
Country	Player	Rank^{1}	Seed
SRB	Novak Djokovic	1	1
GBR	Andy Murray	3	2
SUI	Stan Wawrinka	4	3
JPN	Kei Nishikori	5	4
CZE	Tomáš Berdych	6	5
CRO	Marin Čilić	8	6
ESP	Rafael Nadal	9	7
CAN	Milos Raonic	10	8
FRA	Gilles Simon	11	9
FRA	Jo-Wilfried Tsonga	12	10
~~FRA~~	~~Richard Gasquet~~	~~13~~	~~11~~
RSA	Kevin Anderson	14	12
BEL	David Goffin	15	13
BUL	Grigor Dimitrov	16	14
FRA	Gaël Monfils	17	15
USA	John Isner	18	16

- ^{1}Rankings are as of August 3, 2015

=== Other entrants ===
The following players received wild cards into the main singles draw:

- (Canada) Philip Bester
- (Canada) Frank Dancevic
- (Canada) Filip Peliwo
- (Canada) Vasek Pospisil

The following player received entry using a protected ranking into the singles main draw:

- (Serbia) Janko Tipsarević

The following players received entry from the singles qualifying draw:

- (South Korea) Chung Hyeon
- (Ukraine) Alexandr Dolgopolov
- (Latvia) Ernests Gulbis
- (United States) Denis Kudla
- (Chinese Taipei) Lu Yen-hsun
- (United States) Donald Young
- (Russia) Mikhail Youzhny

The following player received entry as a lucky loser:

- (France) Nicolas Mahut

=== Withdrawals ===
Before the tournament

- (Switzerland) Roger Federer (schedule change) → replaced by (Poland) Jerzy Janowicz
- (Spain) David Ferrer (injury) → replaced by (Ukraine) Sergiy Stakhovsky
- (Spain) Guillermo García López (injury) → replaced by (Luxembourg) Gilles Müller
- (France) Richard Gasquet (illness) → replaced by (France) Nicolas Mahut
- (Argentina) Juan Mónaco (injury) → replaced by (Portugal) João Sousa

=== Retirements ===
- (Switzerland) Stan Wawrinka (back injury)

== ATP doubles main-draw entrants ==
=== Seeds ===
Country	Player	Country	Player	Rank^{1}	Seed
USA	Bob Bryan	USA	Mike Bryan	2	1
BRA	Marcelo Melo	CRO	Ivan Dodig	7	2
ROU	Horia Tecău	NED	Jean-Julien Rojer	15	3
IND	Rohan Bopanna	ROU	Florin Mergea	33	4
SRB	Nenad Zimonjić	POL	Marcin Matkowski	27	5
BRA	Bruno Soares	AUT	Alexander Peya	30	6
GBR	Jamie Murray	AUS	John Peers	35	7
FRA	Pierre-Hugues Herbert	FRA	Nicolas Mahut	43	8

- Rankings are as of August 3, 2015

=== Other entrants ===
The following pairs received wildcards into the doubles main draw:

- (Australia) Lleyton Hewitt / (Australia) Nick Kyrgios
- (Canada) Adil Shamasdin / (Canada) Philip Bester

== WTA singles main-draw entrants ==
=== Seeds ===
Country	Player	Rank^{1}	Seed
USA	Serena Williams	1	1
ROU	Simona Halep	3	2
CZE	Petra Kvitová	4	3
DEN	Caroline Wozniacki	5	4
SRB	Ana Ivanovic	6	5
POL	Agnieszka Radwańska	7	6
CZE	Lucie Šafářová	8	7
ESP	Garbiñe Muguruza	9	8
ESP	Carla Suárez Navarro	10	9
CZE	Karolína Plíšková	11	10
RUS	Ekaterina Makarova	12	11
SUI	Timea Bacsinszky	13	12
GER	Angelique Kerber	14	13
USA	Venus Williams	15	14
ITA	Sara Errani	16	15
GER	Andrea Petkovic	17	16

- ^{1} Rankings are as of August 3, 2015

=== Other entrants ===
The following players received wild cards into the main singles draw:

- (Canada) Françoise Abanda
- (Canada) Gabriela Dabrowski
- (Romania) Simona Halep
- (Canada) Carol Zhao

The following player received entry using a protected ranking into the main singles draw:

- (Slovakia) Dominika Cibulková

The following players received entry from the singles qualifying draw:

- (Japan) Misaki Doi
- (Colombia) Mariana Duque Mariño
- (United States) Irina Falconi
- (Belarus) Olga Govortsova
- (Slovenia) Polona Hercog
- (Croatia) Mirjana Lučić-Baroni
- (Puerto Rico) Monica Puig
- (United States) Anna Tatishvili
- (Ukraine) Lesia Tsurenko
- (United Kingdom) Heather Watson
- (Belgium) Yanina Wickmayer
- (Germany) Carina Witthöft

The following player received entry as a lucky loser:

- (Germany) Julia Görges

=== Withdrawals ===
Before the tournament

- (Italy) Camila Giorgi (illness) → replaced by (Italy) Karin Knapp
- (United States) Madison Keys (left wrist injury) → replaced by (Germany) Julia Görges
- (Russia) Svetlana Kuznetsova (left leg injury) → replaced by (Belgium) Alison Van Uytvanck
- (Russia) Maria Sharapova (right leg strain) → replaced by (United States) Alison Riske

=== Retirements ===
- (Romania) Simona Halep

== WTA doubles main-draw entrants ==
=== Seeds ===
Country	Player	Country	Player	Rank^{1}	Seed
SUI	Martina Hingis	IND	Sania Mirza	3	1
RUS	Ekaterina Makarova	RUS	Elena Vesnina	6	2
USA	Bethanie Mattek-Sands	CZE	Lucie Šafářová	11	3
SLO	Katarina Srebotnik	FRA	Caroline Garcia	32	4
AUS	Casey Dellacqua	KAZ	Yaroslava Shvedova	32	5
ITA	Sara Errani	ITA	Flavia Pennetta	38	6
CZE	Andrea Hlaváčková	CZE	Lucie Hradecká	39	7
ESP	Garbiñe Muguruza	ESP	Carla Suárez Navarro	40	8

- Rankings are as of August 3, 2015

=== Other entrants ===
The following pairs received wildcards into the doubles main draw:

- (Canada) Françoise Abanda / (Canada) Heidi El Tabakh
- (Switzerland) Belinda Bencic / (Slovakia) Dominika Cibulková
- (Canada) Sharon Fichman / (Canada) Carol Zhao
- (Russia) Daria Gavrilova / (Romania) Simona Halep

=== Withdrawals ===
Before the tournament

- (Russia) Anastasia Pavlyuchenkova

== Finals ==
=== Men's singles ===
- (United Kingdom) Andy Murray defeated (Serbia) Novak Djokovic, 6–4, 4–6, 6–3

=== Women's singles ===
- (Switzerland) Belinda Bencic defeated (Romania) Simona Halep, 7–6^{(7–5)}, 6–7^{(4–7)}, 3–0 ret.

=== Men's doubles ===
- (United States) Bob Bryan / (United States) Mike Bryan defeated (Canada) Daniel Nestor / (France) Édouard Roger-Vasselin, 7–6^{(7–5)}, 3–6, [10–6]

=== Women's doubles ===
- (United States) Bethanie Mattek-Sands / (Czech Republic) Lucie Šafářová defeated (France) Caroline Garcia / (Slovenia) Katarina Srebotnik, 6–1, 6–2
