= 2015 Rogers Cup – Women's singles =

Women's singles
- 2015 Rogers Cup

Final
- Champion: (Switzerland) Belinda Bencic
- Runner-up: (Romania) Simona Halep
- Score: 7–6^{(7–5)}, 6–7^{(4–7)}, 3–0 ret.

Details
- Draw: 56
- Seeds: 16

Events
Singles	men	women
Doubles	men	women
- Rogers Cup

Belinda Bencic won the women's singles tennis title at the 2015 Canadian Open after Simona Halep retired in the final, with scoreline at 7–6^{(7–5)}, 6–7^{(4–7)}, 3–0. Bencic defeated six major finalists in succession en route to her first WTA Tour title. At 18 years and 23 weeks of age, Bencic became the youngest woman to win the tournament, surpassing Ana Ivanovic's record from 2006.

Agnieszka Radwańska was the defending champion, but lost in the quarterfinals to Halep.

== Seeds ==
The top eight seeds received a bye into the second round.

1. (United States) Serena Williams (semifinals)
2. (Romania) Simona Halep (final, retired)
3. (Czech Republic) Petra Kvitová (second round)
4. (Denmark) Caroline Wozniacki (second round)
5. (Serbia) Ana Ivanovic (quarterfinals)
6. (Poland) Agnieszka Radwańska (quarterfinals)
7. (Czech Republic) Lucie Šafářová (second round)
8. (Spain) Garbiñe Muguruza (second round)

9. (Spain) Carla Suárez Navarro (first round)
10. (Czech Republic) Karolína Plíšková (first round)
11. (Russia) Ekaterina Makarova (second round)
12. (Switzerland) Timea Bacsinszky (first round)
13. (Germany) Angelique Kerber (third round)
14. (United States) Venus Williams (first round)
15. (Italy) Sara Errani (semifinals)
16. (Germany) Andrea Petkovic (third round)

Click on the seed number of a player to go to their draw section.

== Draw ==
Key

- Q = Qualifier
- WC = Wild card
- LL = Lucky loser
- Alt = Alternate
- ITF = ITF entry
- PR = Protected ranking
- SR = Special ranking
- SE = Special exempt
- JE = Junior exempt
- JR = Junior Accelerator Programme entrant
- CO = College Accelerator Programme entrant
- NG = Next Gen Accelerator Program entrant
- w/o = Walkover
- r = Retired
- d = Defaulted

=== Finals ===
Quarterfinals
1	(United States) Serena Williams	6	6
(Italy) Roberta Vinci	4	3
(Switzerland) Belinda Bencic	6	6
5	(Serbia) Ana Ivanovic	4	2
Q	(Ukraine) Lesia Tsurenko	4	4
15	(Italy) Sara Errani	6	6
6	(Poland) Agnieszka Radwańska	6	3	1
2/WC	(Romania) Simona Halep	0	6	6

Semifinals
1	(United States) Serena Williams	6	5	4
(Switzerland) Belinda Bencic	3	7	6
15	(Italy) Sara Errani	4	4
2/WC	(Romania) Simona Halep	6	6

Final
(Switzerland) Belinda Bencic	7^{7}	6^{4}	3
2/WC	(Romania) Simona Halep	6^{5}	7^{7}	0^{r}

=== Top half ===
==== Section 1 ====
First round
(Italy) F Pennetta	6	6
WC	(Canada) G Dabrowski	4	1
Q	(United States) I Falconi	1	2
Q	(United Kingdom) H Watson	6	6
WC	(Canada) F Abanda	6	4	2
16	(Germany) A Petkovic	3	6	6
10	(Czech Republic) Ka Plíšková	6	6^{5}	2
Q	(Croatia) M Lučić-Baroni	3	7^{7}	6
(Italy) R Vinci	6	6
(Italy) K Knapp	0	0
(Australia) S Stosur	4	4
(Russia) D Gavrilova	6	6

Second round
1	(United States) S Williams	2	6	6
(Italy) F Pennetta	6	3	0
Q	(United Kingdom) H Watson	4	3
16	(Germany) A Petkovic	6	6
Q	(Croatia) M Lučić-Baroni	3	3
(Italy) R Vinci	6	6
(Russia) D Gavrilova	4	7	7
7	(Czech Republic) L Šafářová	6	5	5

Third round
1	(United States) S Williams	6	6
16	(Germany) A Petkovic	3	2
(Italy) R Vinci	6	6
(Russia) D Gavrilova	4	3

Quarterfinals
1	(United States) S Williams	6	6
(Italy) R Vinci	4	3

==== Section 2 ====
First round
(Canada) E Bouchard	0	7	2
(Switzerland) B Bencic	6	5	6
(Czech Republic) B Strýcová	6	6
(United States) V Lepchenko	2	4
(Germany) S Lisicki	6	6
14	(United States) V Williams	0	3
11	(Russia) E Makarova	6	6
Q	(United States) A Tatishvili	3	3
Q	(Slovenia) P Hercog	6	1	6
(Belgium) A Van Uytvanck	4	6	3
Q	(Belarus) O Govortsova	6	7^{7}
(Romania) I-C Begu	3	6^{4}

Second round
4	(Denmark) C Wozniacki	5	5
(Switzerland) B Bencic	7	7
(Czech Republic) B Strýcová	6^{3}	4
(Germany) S Lisicki	7^{7}	6
11	(Russia) E Makarova	2	7^{7}	5
Q	(Slovenia) P Hercog	6	6^{2}	7
Q	(Belarus) O Govortsova	4	6^{4}
5	(Serbia) A Ivanovic	6	7^{7}

Third round
(Switzerland) B Bencic	6	1	7^{7}
(Germany) S Lisicki	1	6	6^{3}
Q	(Slovenia) P Hercog	2	3
5	(Serbia) A Ivanovic	6	6

Quarterfinals
(Switzerland) B Bencic	6	6
5	(Serbia) A Ivanovic	4	2

=== Bottom half ===
==== Section 3 ====
First round
Q	(Ukraine) L Tsurenko	6	7^{7}
Q	(Belgium) Y Wickmayer	3	6^{3}
(United States) C Vandeweghe	3	6	1
Q	(Germany) C Witthöft	6	3	6
(United States) A Riske	3	7^{7}	7^{7}
12	(Switzerland) T Bacsinszky	6	6^{4}	6^{3}
15	(Italy) S Errani	5	6	6
(France) K Mladenovic	7	1	0
(United States) M Brengle	6	6
WC	(Canada) C Zhao	1	1
(Belarus) V Azarenka	6	6
(Ukraine) E Svitolina	1	4

Second round
8	(Spain) G Muguruza	5	1
Q	(Ukraine) L Tsurenko	7	6
Q	(Germany) C Witthöft	6	5	6
(United States) A Riske	4	7	3
15	(Italy) S Errani	6	2	6
(United States) M Brengle	3	6	3
(Belarus) V Azarenka	6	6
3	(Czech Republic) P Kvitová	2	3

Third round
Q	(Ukraine) L Tsurenko	6	6
Q	(Germany) C Witthöft	3	4
15	(Italy) S Errani	7	6
(Belarus) V Azarenka	5	3

Quarterfinals
Q	(Ukraine) L Tsurenko	4	4
15	(Italy) S Errani	6	6

==== Section 4 ====
First round
(Kazakhstan) Z Diyas	6	1	5
LL	(Germany) J Görges	2	6	7
(United States) S Stephens	3	4
PR	(Slovakia) D Cibulková	6	6
(France) A Cornet	6	6^{2}	6
9	(Spain) C Suárez Navarro	3	7^{7}	4
13	(Germany) A Kerber	6	6
Q	(Japan) M Doi	0	1
Q	(Puerto Rico) M Puig	6	4	7
Q	(Colombia) M Duque Mariño	4	6	5
(Serbia) J Janković	7^{7}	6
(France) C Garcia	6^{4}	2

Second round
6	(Poland) A Radwańska	7	6
LL	(Germany) J Görges	5	3
PR	(Slovakia) D Cibulková	3	2
(France) A Cornet	6	6
13	(Germany) A Kerber	6	6
Q	(Puerto Rico) M Puig	2	3
(Serbia) J Janković	3	4
2/WC	(Romania) S Halep	6	6

Third round
6	(Poland) A Radwańska	6	4	6
(France) A Cornet	2	6	4
13	(Germany) A Kerber	3	7	4
2/WC	(Romania) S Halep	6	5	6

Quarterfinals
6	(Poland) A Radwańska	6	3	1
2/WC	(Romania) S Halep	0	6	6

== Qualifying ==
=== Seeds ===
1. (United States) CoCo Vandeweghe (moved to main draw)
2. (Slovakia) Magdaléna Rybáriková (first round)
3. (Croatia) Mirjana Lučić-Baroni (qualified)
4. (Ukraine) Lesia Tsurenko (qualified)
5. (Germany) Carina Witthöft (qualified)
6. (United Kingdom) Heather Watson (qualified)
7. (Czech Republic) Lucie Hradecká (first round)
8. (Germany) Julia Görges (qualifying competition, lucky loser)
9. (Australia) Casey Dellacqua (qualifying competition)
10. (Germany) Mona Barthel (qualifying competition)
11. (Serbia) Aleksandra Krunić (first round)
12. (Croatia) Ajla Tomljanović (qualifying competition)
13. (Kazakhstan) Yulia Putintseva (first round, retired)
14. (Slovenia) Polona Hercog (qualified)
15. (Spain) Lara Arruabarrena (qualifying competition)
16. (Australia) Jarmila Gajdošová (qualifying competition)
17. (United States) Irina Falconi (qualified)
18. (Belarus) Olga Govortsova (qualified)
19. (Poland) Urszula Radwańska (first round)
20. (Hungary) Tímea Babos (first round)
21. (United States) Lauren Davis (first round)
22. (Croatia) Ana Konjuh (first round)
23. (Colombia) Mariana Duque Mariño (qualified)
24. (Poland) Magda Linette (qualifying competition)
25. (Belgium) Yanina Wickmayer (qualified)

=== Qualifiers ===
1. (Slovenia) Polona Hercog
2. (Puerto Rico) Monica Puig
3. (Croatia) Mirjana Lučić-Baroni
4. (Ukraine) Lesia Tsurenko
5. (Germany) Carina Witthöft
6. (United Kingdom) Heather Watson
7. (Colombia) Mariana Duque Mariño
8. (Belgium) Yanina Wickmayer
9. (Japan) Misaki Doi
10. (United States) Anna Tatishvili
11. (Belarus) Olga Govortsova
12. (United States) Irina Falconi

=== Lucky losers ===
1. (Germany) Julia Görges

=== Qualifying draw ===
==== First qualifier ====
First round
13	(Kazakhstan) Yulia Putintseva	0^{r}
(Czech Republic) Tereza Smitková	1
WC	(Canada) Natasha Irani	2	1
14	(Slovenia) Polona Hercog	6	6

Qualifying competition
(Czech Republic) Tereza Smitková	2	4
14	(Slovenia) Polona Hercog	6	6

==== Second qualifier ====
First round
2	(Slovakia) Magdaléna Rybáriková	6	3	2
(Puerto Rico) Monica Puig	2	6	6
(Kazakhstan) Yaroslava Shvedova	7^{7}	6
20	(Hungary) Tímea Babos	6^{5}	1

Qualifying competition
(Puerto Rico) Monica Puig	6	6
(Kazakhstan) Yaroslava Shvedova	4	4

==== Third qualifier ====
First round
3	(Croatia) Mirjana Lučić-Baroni	6	6
WC	(Canada) Katherine Sebov	4	1
(Belarus) Aliaksandra Sasnovich	7	7^{7}
19	(Poland) Urszula Radwańska	5	6^{3}

Qualifying competition
3	(Croatia) Mirjana Lučić-Baroni	6	4	7^{7}
(Belarus) Aliaksandra Sasnovich	2	6	6^{4}

==== Fourth qualifier ====
First round
4	(Ukraine) Lesia Tsurenko	6	6
(United States) Nicole Gibbs	4	3
(United States) Louisa Chirico	3	4
15	(Spain) Lara Arruabarrena	6	6

Qualifying competition
4	(Ukraine) Lesia Tsurenko	6	6
15	(Spain) Lara Arruabarrena	1	4

==== Fifth qualifier ====
First round
5	(Germany) Carina Witthöft	3	6	6
(Bulgaria) Sesil Karatantcheva	6	4	4
(Poland) Paula Kania	3	2
24	(Poland) Magda Linette	6	6

Qualifying competition
5	(Germany) Carina Witthöft	6	6
24	(Poland) Magda Linette	4	3

==== Sixth qualifier ====
First round
6	(United Kingdom) Heather Watson	6	6
(Russia) Elena Vesnina	4	0
WC	(Canada) Heidi El Tabakh	4	2
16	(Australia) Jarmila Gajdošová	6	6

Qualifying competition
6	(United Kingdom) Heather Watson	6	3	6
16	(Australia) Jarmila Gajdošová	1	6	2

==== Seventh qualifier ====
First round
7	(Czech Republic) Lucie Hradecká	6^{4}	7^{7}	6^{6}
(Russia) Alla Kudryavtseva	7^{7}	6^{1}	7^{8}
WC	(Canada) Charlotte Robillard-Millette	4	3
23	(Colombia) Mariana Duque Mariño	6	6

Qualifying competition
(Russia) Alla Kudryavtseva	2	3
23	(Colombia) Mariana Duque Mariño	6	6

==== Eighth qualifier ====
First round
8	(Germany) Julia Görges	6	7^{7}
(United States) Bethanie Mattek-Sands	3	6^{3}
(Croatia) Donna Vekić	6	4	5
25	(Belgium) Yanina Wickmayer	1	6	7

Qualifying competition
8	(Germany) Julia Görges	6	3	6^{4}
25	(Belgium) Yanina Wickmayer	0	6	7^{7}

==== Ninth qualifier ====
First round
9	(Australia) Casey Dellacqua	6	6
(Austria) Tamira Paszek	4	4
(Japan) Misaki Doi	6	7^{7}
22	(Croatia) Ana Konjuh	2	6^{4}

Qualifying competition
9	(Australia) Casey Dellacqua	3	4
(Japan) Misaki Doi	6	6

==== Tenth qualifier ====
First round
10	(Germany) Mona Barthel	6	7^{7}
(Israel) Shahar Pe'er	3	6^{4}
(United States) Anna Tatishvili	6	6
21	(United States) Lauren Davis	4	4

Qualifying competition
10	(Germany) Mona Barthel	3	3
(United States) Anna Tatishvili	6	6

==== Eleventh qualifier ====
First round
11	(Serbia) Aleksandra Krunić	5	1
Alt	(Israel) Julia Glushko	7	6
WC	(Canada) Bianca Andreescu	5	0
18	(Belarus) Olga Govortsova	7	6

Qualifying competition
Alt	(Israel) Julia Glushko	0	6	3
18	(Belarus) Olga Govortsova	6	2	6

==== Twelfth qualifier ====
First round
12	(Croatia) Ajla Tomljanović	2	6	6
(United States) Sachia Vickery	6	4	2
WC	(Canada) Sharon Fichman	3	1
17	(United States) Irina Falconi	6	6

Qualifying competition
12	(Croatia) Ajla Tomljanović	1	2
17	(United States) Irina Falconi	6	6
