= 2013 Toray Pan Pacific Open =

- Date: September 22–28
- Edition: 30th
- Category: Premier Series
- Surface: Hard / outdoor
- Location: Tokyo, Japan
- Venue: Ariake Coliseum

Champions

Singles
- (Czech Republic) Petra Kvitová

Doubles
- (Zimbabwe) Cara Black / (India) Sania Mirza
← 2012 ·	Pan Pacific Open	· 2014 →

The 2013 Toray Pan Pacific Open was a women's tennis tournament played on outdoor hard courts. It was the 30th edition of the Toray Pan Pacific Open, and part of the Premier Series of the 2013 WTA Tour. It took place at the Ariake Coliseum in Tokyo, Japan, from September 22 through 28, 2013. Seventh-seeded Petra Kvitová won the singles title.

== Finals ==
=== Singles ===
- (Czech Republic) Petra Kvitová default (Germany) Angelique Kerber 6–2, 0–6, 6–3

=== Doubles ===
- (Zimbabwe) Cara Black / (India) Sania Mirza default (Chinese Taipei) Chan Hao-ching / (United States) Liezel Huber 4–6, 6–0, [11–9]

== Points and prize money ==
=== Point distribution ===
Event	W	F	SF	QF	Round of 16	Round of 32	Round of 64	Q	Q2	Q1
Singles	900	620	395	225	125	70	1	30	20	1
Doubles	900	620	395	225	125	1	—	—	—	—

=== Prize money ===
Event	W	F	SF	QF	Round of 16	Round of 32	Round of 64	Q2	Q1
Singles	$426,000	$213,000	$106,425	$49,050	$24,300	$12,480	$6,415	$3,565	$1,840
Doubles	$122,000	$66,200	$35,100	$18,650	$10,150	—	—	—	—
Doubles prize money per team

== Singles main-draw entrants ==
=== Seeds ===
Country	Player	Rank^{1}	Seed
BLR	Victoria Azarenka	2	1
POL	Agnieszka Radwańska	4	2
ITA	Sara Errani	6	3
DEN	Caroline Wozniacki	8	4
GER	Angelique Kerber	9	5
SRB	Jelena Janković	10	6
CZE	Petra Kvitová	11	7
ITA	Roberta Vinci	12	8
USA	Sloane Stephens	13	9
ESP	Carla Suárez Navarro	14	10
SRB	Ana Ivanovic	16	11
AUS	Samantha Stosur	17	12
ROU	Simona Halep	18	13
BEL	Kirsten Flipkens	20	14
ROU	Sorana Cîrstea	22	15
SVK	Dominika Cibulková	23	16

- ^{1} Rankings are as of September 16, 2013

=== Other entrants ===
The following players received wildcards into the singles main draw:

- (Switzerland) Belinda Bencic
- (Japan) Misaki Doi
- (Japan) Kurumi Nara

The following players received entry from the qualifying draw:

- (Australia) Casey Dellacqua
- (Russia) Daria Gavrilova
- (Slovenia) Polona Hercog
- (Argentina) Paula Ormaechea
- (Japan) Risa Ozaki
- (Australia) Anastasia Rodionova
- (Spain) María Teresa Torró Flor
- (Czech Republic) Barbora Záhlavová-Strýcová

=== Withdrawals ===
Before the tournament

- (France) Marion Bartoli (retirement from tennis)
- (United States) Jamie Hampton (left ankle injury)
- (Russia) Maria Kirilenko
- (Germany) Sabine Lisicki (fever)
- (Russia) Ekaterina Makarova
- (Russia) Nadia Petrova (left hip injury)
- (Russia) Maria Sharapova (right shoulder injury)
- (United States) Serena Williams (fatigue)

=== Retirements ===
- (Russia) Anastasia Pavlyuchenkova (illness)
- (Australia) Anastasia Rodionova (left abdominal injury)

== Doubles main-draw entrants ==
=== Seeds ===
Country	Player	Country	Player	Rank^{1}	Seed
TPE	Hsieh Su-wei	CHN	Peng Shuai	19	1
AUS	Ashleigh Barty	AUS	Casey Dellacqua	23	2
SRB	Jelena Janković	SLO	Katarina Srebotnik	26	3
GER	Anna-Lena Grönefeld	CZE	Květa Peschke	27	4

- ^{1} Rankings are as of September 16, 2013

=== Other entrants ===
The following pairs received wildcards into the doubles main draw:

- (Slovakia) Dominika Cibulková / (New Zealand) Marina Erakovic
- (Japan) Kimiko Date-Krumm / (Spain) Arantxa Parra Santonja
- (Belgium) Kirsten Flipkens / (Czech Republic) Petra Kvitová

The following pair received entry as alternates:

- (Japan) Shuko Aoyama / (United States) Megan Moulton-Levy

=== Withdrawals ===
Before the tournament

- (Switzerland) Martina Hingis (personal reasons)
- (Russia) Anastasia Pavlyuchenkova (illness)
