= 2017 Rogers Cup – Women's doubles =

Women's tennis tournament

Women's doubles
- 2017 Rogers Cup

Final
- Champions: (Russia) Ekaterina Makarova (Russia) Elena Vesnina
- Runners-up: (Germany) Anna-Lena Grönefeld (Czech Republic) Květa Peschke
- Score: 6–0, 6–4

Details
- Draw: 28
- Seeds: 8

Events
Singles	men	women
Doubles	men	women
- Rogers Cup

Ekaterina Makarova and Elena Vesnina successfully defended their title, defeating Anna-Lena Grönefeld and Květa Peschke in the final, 6–0, 6–4.

== Seeds ==
The top four seeds received a bye into the second round.

1. (Russia) Ekaterina Makarova / (Russia) Elena Vesnina (champions)
2. (Chinese Taipei) Chan Yung-jan / (Switzerland) Martina Hingis (quarterfinals)
3. (Czech Republic) Lucie Šafářová / (Czech Republic) Barbora Strýcová (semifinals)
4. (India) Sania Mirza / (China) Peng Shuai (quarterfinals, withdrew)
5. (Hungary) Tímea Babos / (Czech Republic) Andrea Hlaváčková (first round)
6. (Czech Republic) Lucie Hradecká / (Czech Republic) Kateřina Siniaková (first round)
7. (Australia) Ashleigh Barty / (Australia) Casey Dellacqua (first round)
8. (Germany) Anna-Lena Grönefeld / (Czech Republic) Květa Peschke (final)

== Draw ==
Key

- Q = Qualifier
- WC = Wild card
- LL = Lucky loser
- Alt = Alternate
- ITF = ITF entry
- PR = Protected ranking
- SR = Special ranking
- SE = Special exempt
- JE = Junior exempt
- JR = Junior Accelerator Programme entrant
- CO = College Accelerator Programme entrant
- NG = Next Gen Accelerator Program entrant
- w/o = Walkover
- r = Retired
- d = Defaulted

=== Finals ===
Semifinals
1	(Russia) Ekaterina Makarova (Russia) Elena Vesnina	6	6
(Ukraine) Nadiia Kichenok (Australia) Anastasia Rodionova	4	0
3	(Czech Republic) Lucie Šafářová (Czech Republic) Barbora Strýcová	1	5
8	(Germany) Anna-Lena Grönefeld (Czech Republic) Květa Peschke	6	7

Final
1	(Russia) Ekaterina Makarova (Russia) Elena Vesnina	6	6
8	(Germany) Anna-Lena Grönefeld (Czech Republic) Květa Peschke	0	4

=== Top half ===
First round
(France) K Mladenovic (Russia) A Pavlyuchenkova	5	6	[8]
WC	(Canada) B Andreescu (Canada) C Branstine	7	2	[10]
(Ukraine) L Kichenok (United States) N Melichar	3	6	[10]
(United States) A Spears (Slovenia) K Srebotnik	6	3	[4]
(Chinese Taipei) C-j Chuang (Czech Republic) R Voráčová	7	6
6	(Czech Republic) L Hradecká (Czech Republic) K Siniaková	5	1
WC	(Canada) C Robillard-Millette (Canada) C Zhao	1	4
Alt	(United States) L Davis (United States) A Riske	6	6
(Japan) S Aoyama (Croatia) D Jurak	7	4	[2]
(Ukraine) N Kichenok (Australia) An Rodionova	5	6	[10]
(United States) R Atawo (Australia) D Gavrilova	6	3	[10]
5	(Hungary) T Babos (Czech Republic) A Hlaváčková	3	6	[4]

Second round
1	(Russia) E Makarova (Russia) E Vesnina	6	6
WC	(Canada) B Andreescu (Canada) C Branstine	1	1
(Ukraine) L Kichenok (United States) N Melichar	6	6
(Chinese Taipei) C-j Chuang (Czech Republic) R Voráčová	4	3
4	(India) S Mirza (China) S Peng	7^{10}	6
Alt	(United States) L Davis (United States) A Riske	6^{8}	3
(Ukraine) N Kichenok (Australia) An Rodionova	6	6
(United States) R Atawo (Australia) D Gavrilova	2	2

Quarterfinals
1	(Russia) E Makarova (Russia) E Vesnina	6	6
(Ukraine) L Kichenok (United States) N Melichar	4	4
4	(India) S Mirza (China) S Peng
(Ukraine) N Kichenok (Australia) An Rodionova	w/o

Semifinals
1	(Russia) E Makarova (Russia) E Vesnina	6	6
(Ukraine) N Kichenok (Australia) An Rodionova	4	0

=== Bottom half ===
First round
7	(Australia) A Barty (Australia) C Dellacqua	6	4	[11]
(Germany) J Görges (Ukraine) O Savchuk	3	6	[13]
(Japan) E Hozumi (Japan) M Kato	5	3
(Canada) G Dabrowski (Latvia) J Ostapenko	7	6
(United States) C McHale (United States) A Muhammad	1	3
(Czech Republic) B Krejčíková (Romania) M Niculescu	6	6
8	(Germany) A-L Grönefeld (Czech Republic) K Peschke	6	0	[10]
(Japan) N Hibino (Poland) A Rosolska	3	6	[8]
WC	(Canada) E Bouchard (Czech Republic) Ka Plíšková	6	6
(Slovakia) D Cibulková (Belgium) K Flipkens	4	2
(Slovenia) A Klepač (Spain) MJ Martínez Sánchez	6	3	[10]
(United Kingdom) J Konta (Ukraine) E Svitolina	2	6	[6]

Second round
(Germany) J Görges (Ukraine) O Savchuk	6	2	[3]
(Canada) G Dabrowski (Latvia) J Ostapenko	4	6	[10]
(Czech Republic) B Krejčíková (Romania) M Niculescu	2	4
3	(Czech Republic) L Šafářová (Czech Republic) B Strýcová	6	6
8	(Germany) A-L Grönefeld (Czech Republic) K Peschke	7	1	[11]
WC	(Canada) E Bouchard (Czech Republic) Ka Plíšková	5	6	[9]
(Slovenia) A Klepač (Spain) MJ Martínez Sánchez	1	6^{4}
2	(Chinese Taipei) Y-j Chan (Switzerland) M Hingis	6	7^{7}

Quarterfinals
(Canada) G Dabrowski (Latvia) J Ostapenko	5	3
3	(Czech Republic) L Šafářová (Czech Republic) B Strýcová	7	6
8	(Germany) A-L Grönefeld (Czech Republic) K Peschke	6	6
2	(Chinese Taipei) Y-j Chan (Switzerland) M Hingis	4	4

Semifinals
3	(Czech Republic) L Šafářová (Czech Republic) B Strýcová	1	5
8	(Germany) A-L Grönefeld (Czech Republic) K Peschke	6	7
