= 2006 Rogers Cup – Doubles =

Doubles
- 2006 Rogers Cup

Final
- Champions: (United States) Martina Navratilova (Russia) Nadia Petrova
- Runners-up: (Zimbabwe) Cara Black (Germany) Anna-Lena Grönefeld
- Score: 6–1, 6–2

Details
- Draw: 28
- Seeds: 8

Events
Singles	Doubles
- Rogers Cup

Anna-Lena Grönefeld and Martina Navratilova were the defending champions, but they decided not to compete with each other. Grönefeld participated with Cara Black, but the pair were defeated by Navratilova and Nadia Petrova in the final, 6–1, 6–2. This was Navratilova's 177th WTA doubles title, and was her final doubles title before her retirement later in 2006. Navratilova's 177 doubles titles is an Open Era record.

== Seeds ==
The top four seeds received a bye into the second round.

1. (China) Zi Yan / (China) Jie Zheng (quarterfinals)
2. (Zimbabwe) Cara Black / (Germany) Anna-Lena Grönefeld (final)
3. (Czech Republic) Květa Peschke / (Italy) Francesca Schiavone (quarterfinals)
4. (Russia) Dinara Safina / (Slovenia) Katarina Srebotnik (semifinals)
5. (Spain) Virginia Ruano Pascual / (Argentina) Paola Suárez (first round)
6. (China) Ting Li / (China) Tiantian Sun (second round)
7. (Argentina) Gisela Dulko / (United States) Corina Morariu (second round)
8. (France) Nathalie Dechy / (Japan) Ai Sugiyama (quarterfinals)

== Draw ==
Key

- Q = Qualifier
- WC = Wild card
- LL = Lucky loser
- Alt = Alternate
- ITF = ITF entry
- PR = Protected ranking
- SR = Special ranking
- SE = Special exempt
- JE = Junior exempt
- JR = Junior Accelerator Programme entrant
- CO = College Accelerator Programme entrant
- NG = Next Gen Accelerator Program entrant
- w/o = Walkover
- r = Retired
- d = Defaulted

=== Finals ===
Semifinals
(United States) Martina Navratilova (Russia) Nadia Petrova	6	6
(France) Marion Bartoli (Israel) Shahar Pe'er	3	3
4	(Russia) Dinara Safina (Slovenia) Katarina Srebotnik	2	2
2	(Zimbabwe) Cara Black (Germany) Anna-Lena Grönefeld	6	6

Final
(United States) Martina Navratilova (Russia) Nadia Petrova	6	6
2	(Zimbabwe) Cara Black (Germany) Anna-Lena Grönefeld	1	2

=== Top half ===
First round
LL	(Croatia) J Kostanić (Czech Republic) V Uhlířová	2	2
(Serbia) J Janković (China) N Li	6	6
LL	(Canada) S Fichman (Canada) V Tétreault	0	1
(United States) M Navratilova (Russia) N Petrova	6	6
(Russia) A Jidkova (Spain) MJ Martínez Sánchez	6	4	4
7	(Argentina) G Dulko (United States) C Morariu	3	6	6
(Poland) M Domachowska (India) S Mirza	6	2	5
(Italy) T Garbin (United States) M Tu	3	6	7
(France) M Bartoli (Israel) S Pe'er	6	6
WC	(Canada) S Dubois (Canada) A Wozniak	3	1
(Ukraine) A Bondarenko (Ukraine) K Bondarenko	6	6
5	(Spain) V Ruano Pascual (Argentina) P Suárez	2	3

Second round
1	(China) Z Yan (China) J Zheng	w/o
(Serbia) J Janković (China) N Li
(United States) M Navratilova (Russia) N Petrova	7	6
7	(Argentina) G Dulko (United States) C Morariu	6^{1}	2
3	(Czech Republic) K Peschke (Italy) F Schiavone	7	6
(Italy) T Garbin (United States) M Tu	5	0
(France) M Bartoli (Israel) S Pe'er	6	7
(Ukraine) A Bondarenko (Ukraine) K Bondarenko	3	5

Quarterfinals
1	(China) Z Yan (China) J Zheng	4	6	4
(United States) M Navratilova (Russia) N Petrova	6	3	6
3	(Czech Republic) K Peschke (Italy) F Schiavone	2	6	0
(France) M Bartoli (Israel) S Pe'er	6	3	6

Semifinals
(United States) M Navratilova (Russia) N Petrova	6	6
(France) M Bartoli (Israel) S Pe'er	3	3

=== Bottom half ===
First round
8	(France) N Dechy (Japan) A Sugiyama	6	7
LL	(France) S Foretz (Germany) J Schruff	2	6^{5}
(Slovakia) J Husárová (Italy) F Pennetta
Q	(Russia) A Chakvetadze (Russia) E Vesnina	w/o
(Latvia) L Dekmeijere (Russia) V Dushevina	6	7
(Netherlands) M Krajicek (Italy) M Santangelo	3	6^{5}
6	(China) T Li (China) T Sun	7	6
(Australia) A Molik (Kazakhstan) G Voskoboeva	6^{4}	1
WC	(France) T Golovin (Canada) M-È Pelletier
(Serbia) A Ivanovic (Russia) M Kirilenko	w/o
(Australia) N Pratt (Australia) B Stewart	0	2
(Russia) A Rodionova (Romania) A Vanc	6	6

Second round
8	(France) N Dechy (Japan) A Sugiyama	5	6	7
Q	(Russia) A Chakvetadze (Russia) E Vesnina	7	1	6^{2}
(Latvia) L Dekmeijere (Russia) V Dushevina	4	2
4	(Russia) D Safina (Slovenia) K Srebotnik	6	6
6	(China) T Li (China) T Sun	0	6^{4}
(Serbia) A Ivanovic (Russia) M Kirilenko	6	7
(Russia) A Rodionova (Romania) A Vanc	3	4
2	(Zimbabwe) C Black (Germany) A-L Grönefeld	6	6

Quarterfinals
8	(France) N Dechy (Japan) A Sugiyama	6^{6}	6	2
4	(Russia) D Safina (Slovenia) K Srebotnik	7	3	6
(Serbia) A Ivanovic (Russia) M Kirilenko	4	6	4
2	(Zimbabwe) C Black (Germany) A-L Grönefeld	6	2	6

Semifinals
4	(Russia) D Safina (Slovenia) K Srebotnik	2	2
2	(Zimbabwe) C Black (Germany) A-L Grönefeld	6	6
