= 2014 Wuhan Open – Doubles =

Doubles
- 2014 Wuhan Open

Final
- Champions: (Switzerland) Martina Hingis (Italy) Flavia Pennetta
- Runners-up: (Zimbabwe) Cara Black (France) Caroline Garcia
- Score: 6–4, 5–7, [12–10]

Details
- Draw: 28
- Seeds: 8

Events
Singles	Doubles
- Wuhan Open

Martina Hingis and Flavia Pennetta won the first edition of the tournament by defeating Cara Black and Caroline Garcia 6–4, 5–7, [12–10] in the final.

== Seeds ==
1. (Italy) Sara Errani / (Italy) Roberta Vinci (quarterfinals)
2. (Czech Republic) Květa Peschke / (Slovenia) Katarina Srebotnik (second round)
3. (United States) Raquel Kops-Jones / (United States) Abigail Spears (semifinals)
4. (Czech Republic) Andrea Hlaváčková / (China) Peng Shuai (semifinals)
5. (Russia) Alla Kudryavtseva / (Australia) Anastasia Rodionova (quarterfinals)
6. (Switzerland) Martina Hingis / (Italy) Flavia Pennetta (champions)
7. (Spain) Garbiñe Muguruza / (Spain) Carla Suárez Navarro (second round; withdrew)
8. (Zimbabwe) Cara Black / (France) Caroline Garcia (final)

== Draw ==
Key

- Q = Qualifier
- WC = Wild card
- LL = Lucky loser
- Alt = Alternate
- ITF = ITF entry
- PR = Protected ranking
- SR = Special ranking
- SE = Special exempt
- JE = Junior exempt
- JR = Junior Accelerator Programme entrant
- CO = College Accelerator Programme entrant
- NG = Next Gen Accelerator Program entrant
- w/o = Walkover
- r = Retired
- d = Defaulted

=== Finals ===
Semifinals
8	(Zimbabwe) Cara Black (France) Caroline Garcia	2	6	[10]
4	(Czech Republic) Andrea Hlaváčková (China) Peng Shuai	6	3	[7]
3	(United States) Raquel Kops-Jones (United States) Abigail Spears	4	4
6	(Switzerland) Martina Hingis (Italy) Flavia Pennetta	6	6

Final
8	(Zimbabwe) Cara Black (France) Caroline Garcia	4	7	[10]
6	(Switzerland) Martina Hingis (Italy) Flavia Pennetta	6	5	[12]

=== Top half ===
First round
(Croatia) D Jurak (United States) M Moulton-Levy	6	6
(Australia) C Dellacqua (United States) L Raymond	2	4
(Poland) K Jans-Ignacik (France) K Mladenovic	6	7
Alt	(China) R Tian (China) Z Yang	4	5
(United States) A Riske (United Kingdom) H Watson	1	4
8	(Zimbabwe) C Black (France) C Garcia	6	6
(Georgia (country)) O Kalashnikova (France) L Thorpe	6	3	[8]
(Germany) M Barthel (Luxembourg) M Minella	3	6	[10]
(Czech Republic) K Koukalová (Spain) A Medina Garrigues	7	6
(Slovenia) A Klepač (Spain) A Parra Santonja	5	1
(Spain) S Soler Espinosa (Spain) MT Torró Flor	6	3	[9]
7	(Spain) G Muguruza (Spain) C Suárez Navarro	3	6	[11]

Second round
1	(Italy) S Errani (Italy) R Vinci	6	6
(Croatia) D Jurak (United States) M Moulton-Levy	4	1
(Poland) K Jans-Ignacik (France) K Mladenovic	7	4	5
8	(Zimbabwe) C Black (France) C Garcia	5	6	[10]
4	(Czech Republic) A Hlaváčková (China) S Peng	6	6
(Germany) M Barthel (Luxembourg) M Minella	3	3
(Czech Republic) K Koukalová (Spain) A Medina Garrigues	w/o
7	(Spain) G Muguruza (Spain) C Suárez Navarro

Quarterfinals
1	(Italy) S Errani (Italy) R Vinci	6	1	[4]
8	(Zimbabwe) C Black (France) C Garcia	3	6	[10]
4	(Czech Republic) A Hlaváčková (China) S Peng	7	6
(Czech Republic) K Koukalová (Spain) A Medina Garrigues	5	4

Semifinals
8	(Zimbabwe) C Black (France) C Garcia	2	6	[10]
4	(Czech Republic) A Hlaváčková (China) S Peng	6	3	[7]

=== Bottom half ===
First round
5	(Russia) A Kudryavtseva (Australia) A Rodionova	6	7
(China) Y Xu (China) K Zhang	3	5
(Germany) A-L Grönefeld (Poland) A Rosolska	2	6	[10]
(New Zealand) M Erakovic (Switzerland) S Vögele	6	4	[5]
(Slovakia) D Hantuchová (Czech Republic) B Záhlavová-Strýcová	6	6
WC	(China) Y Wang (China) L Zhu	4	1
6	(Switzerland) M Hingis (Italy) F Pennetta	w/o
(Russia) A Pavlyuchenkova (Czech Republic) L Šafářová
(Romania) M Niculescu (Romania) R Olaru	2	6	[3]
(Australia) J Gajdošová (Croatia) A Tomljanović	6	3	[10]
WC	(United States) B Mattek-Sands (Germany) A Petkovic	6^{8}	6	[10]
(Czech Republic) Ka Plíšková (Czech Republic) Kr Plíšková	7^{10}	3	[7]

Second round
5	(Russia) A Kudryavtseva (Australia) A Rodionova	4	6	[10]
(Germany) A-L Grönefeld (Poland) A Rosolska	6	1	[2]
(Slovakia) D Hantuchová (Czech Republic) B Záhlavová-Strýcová	1	3
3	(United States) R Kops-Jones (United States) A Spears	6	6
6	(Switzerland) M Hingis (Italy) F Pennetta	7	6
(Australia) J Gajdošová (Croatia) A Tomljanović	5	2
WC	(United States) B Mattek-Sands (Germany) A Petkovic	6	6
2	(Czech Republic) K Peschke (Slovenia) K Srebotnik	4	4

Quarterfinals
5	(Russia) A Kudryavtseva (Australia) A Rodionova	6	5	[4]
3	(United States) R Kops-Jones (United States) A Spears	3	7	[10]
6	(Switzerland) M Hingis (Italy) F Pennetta	2
WC	(United States) B Mattek-Sands (Germany) A Petkovic	3^{r}

Semifinals
3	(United States) R Kops-Jones (United States) A Spears	4	4
6	(Switzerland) M Hingis (Italy) F Pennetta	6	6
