= 2013 Toray Pan Pacific Open – Doubles =

Doubles
- 2013 Toray Pan Pacific Open

Final
- Champions: (Zimbabwe) Cara Black (India) Sania Mirza
- Runners-up: (Chinese Taipei) Chan Hao-ching (United States) Liezel Huber
- Score: 4–6, 6–0, [11–9]

Events
Singles	Doubles
← 2012 ·	Toray Pan Pacific Open	· 2014 →

Raquel Kops-Jones and Abigail Spears were the defending champions, but lost in the first round to Jelena Janković and Katarina Srebotnik.
Cara Black and Sania Mirza won the title, defeating Chan Hao-ching and Liezel Huber in the final, 4–6, 6–0, [11–9].

== Seeds ==
1. (Chinese Taipei) Hsieh Su-wei / (China) Peng Shuai (semifinals)
2. (Australia) Ashleigh Barty / (Australia) Casey Dellacqua (first round)
3. (Serbia) Jelena Janković / (Slovenia) Katarina Srebotnik (quarterfinals)
4. (Germany) Anna-Lena Grönefeld / (Czech Republic) Květa Peschke (quarterfinals)

== Draw ==
=== Key ===
- Q = Qualifier
- WC = Wild card
- LL = Lucky loser
- Alt = Alternate
- SE = Special exempt
- PR = Protected ranking
- ITF = ITF entry
- JE = Junior exempt
- w/o = Walkover
- r = Retired
- d = Defaulted
- SR = Special ranking

=== Draw ===
First round
1	(Chinese Taipei) S-w Hsieh (China) S Peng	6	6
(Slovakia) D Hantuchová (United States) L Raymond	3	1
WC	(Slovakia) D Cibulková (New Zealand) M Erakovic	6	3	[8]
(Germany) J Görges (Czech Republic) B Záhlavová-Strýcová	3	6	[10]
4	(Germany) A-L Grönefeld (Czech Republic) K Peschke	6	6
Alt	(Japan) S Aoyama (United States) M Moulton-Levy	4	2
(France) K Mladenovic (Italy) F Pennetta	6	0	[7]
(Zimbabwe) C Black (India) S Mirza	2	6	[10]
(Chinese Taipei) H-c Chan (United States) L Huber	6	6
WC	(Japan) K Date-Krumm (Spain) A Parra Santonja	4	2
(United States) R Kops-Jones (United States) A Spears	6	3	[2]
3	(Serbia) J Janković (Slovenia) K Srebotnik	4	6	[10]
(Luxembourg) M Minella (Russia) E Vesnina	3	1
(Russia) A Kudryavtseva (Australia) A Rodionova	6	6
WC	(Belgium) K Flipkens (Czech Republic) P Kvitová	7^{7}	3	[10]
2	(Australia) A Barty (Australia) C Dellacqua	6^{3}	6	[8]

Quarterfinals
1	(Chinese Taipei) S-w Hsieh (China) S Peng	6	6
(Germany) J Görges (Czech Republic) B Záhlavová-Strýcová	3	4
4	(Germany) A-L Grönefeld (Czech Republic) K Peschke	5	3
(Zimbabwe) C Black (India) S Mirza	7	6
(Chinese Taipei) H-c Chan (United States) L Huber	6	6
3	(Serbia) J Janković (Slovenia) K Srebotnik	1	2
(Russia) A Kudryavtseva (Australia) A Rodionova	w/o
WC	(Belgium) K Flipkens (Czech Republic) P Kvitová

Semifinals
1	(Chinese Taipei) S-w Hsieh (China) S Peng	4	2
(Zimbabwe) C Black (India) S Mirza	6	6
(Chinese Taipei) H-c Chan (United States) L Huber	6^{3}	6	[10]
(Russia) A Kudryavtseva (Australia) A Rodionova	7^{7}	4	[7]

Final
(Zimbabwe) C Black (India) S Mirza	4	6	[11]
(Chinese Taipei) H-c Chan (United States) L Huber	6	0	[9]
