= 2011 Rogers Cup – Women's singles qualifying =

This article shows the Qualifying Draw for the 2011 Rogers Cup.

== Players ==
=== Seeds ===
1. (Spain) María José Martínez Sánchez (qualified)
2. (Slovenia) Polona Hercog (qualified)
3. (Czech Republic) Iveta Benešová (qualified)
4. (Spain) Lourdes Domínguez Lino (qualifying competition) (lucky loser)
5. (Serbia) Bojana Jovanovski (qualified)
6. (Japan) Kimiko Date-Krumm (qualifying competition)
7. (Romania) Simona Halep (qualified)
8. (Italy) Alberta Brianti (qualified)
9. (Romania) Monica Niculescu (qualifying competition)
10. (United Kingdom) Elena Baltacha (qualifying competition)
11. (India) Sania Mirza (qualifying competition)
12. (Latvia) Anastasija Sevastova (first round)
13. (Ukraine) Kateryna Bondarenko (qualifying competition)
14. (Hungary) Gréta Arn (qualified)
15. (Czech Republic) Barbora Záhlavová-Strýcová (qualifying competition)
16. (France) Virginie Razzano (qualifying competition, retired)
17. (Russia) Alla Kudryavtseva (first round)
18. (China) Zheng Jie (qualified)
19. (Georgia (country)) Anna Tatishvili (qualifying competition)
20. (Croatia) Petra Martić (qualified)
21. (China) Zhang Shuai (qualified)
22. (United States) Vania King (first round)
23. (South Africa) Chanelle Scheepers (first round)
24. (United Kingdom) Anne Keothavong (first round)

== Qualifiers ==
1. (Spain) María José Martínez Sánchez
2. (Slovenia) Polona Hercog
3. (Czech Republic) Iveta Benešová
4. (China) Zhang Shuai
5. (Serbia) Bojana Jovanovski
6. (China) Zheng Jie
7. (Romania) Simona Halep
8. (Italy) Alberta Brianti
9. (Croatia) Petra Martić
10. (Hungary) Gréta Arn
11. (Germany) Kathrin Wörle
12. (Kazakhstan) Galina Voskoboeva

== Lucky losers ==
1. (Spain) Lourdes Domínguez Lino

== Qualifying draw ==
=== First qualifier ===
First round
1	(Spain) María José Martínez Sánchez	6	3	6
PR	(Australia) Monique Adamczak	4	6	1
(Chinese Taipei) Chang Kai-chen	3	3
19	(Georgia (country)) Anna Tatishvili	6	6

Qualifying competition
1	(Spain) María José Martínez Sánchez	6	6
19	(Georgia (country)) Anna Tatishvili	4	2

=== Second qualifier ===
First round
2	(Slovenia) Polona Hercog	6	7^{7}
WC	(Canada) Kimberley-Ann Surin	0	6^{3}
(United Kingdom) Heather Watson	6	6
23	(South Africa) Chanelle Scheepers	1	4

Qualifying competition
2	(Slovenia) Polona Hercog	2	6	6
(United Kingdom) Heather Watson	6	3	2

=== Third qualifier ===
First round
3	(Czech Republic) Iveta Benešová	6	6
(Croatia) Mirjana Lučić	4	2
WC	(Canada) Marie-Ève Pelletier	7	3	2
16	(France) Virginie Razzano	5	6	6

Qualifying competition
3	(Czech Republic) Iveta Benešová	6	0
16	(France) Virginie Razzano	1	0^{r}

=== Fourth qualifier ===
First round
4	(Spain) Lourdes Domínguez Lino	6	7^{7}
(United States) Jill Craybas	3	6^{5}
(Australia) Anastasia Rodionova	5	1
21	(China) Zhang Shuai	7	6

Qualifying competition
4	(Spain) Lourdes Domínguez Lino	0	6	4
21	(China) Zhang Shuai	6	4	6

=== Fifth qualifier ===
First round
5	(Serbia) Bojana Jovanovski	6	6
(United States) Melanie Oudin	4	2
(Spain) Arantxa Parra Santonja	0	6	6
22	(United States) Vania King	6	4	4

Qualifying competition
5	(Serbia) Bojana Jovanovski	6	6^{4}	6
(Spain) Arantxa Parra Santonja	2	7^{7}	4

=== Sixth qualifier ===
First round
6	(Japan) Kimiko Date-Krumm	6	7^{7}
WC	(Canada) Gabriela Dabrowski	3	6^{4}
(France) Stéphanie Foretz Gacon	4	6	6^{7}
18	(China) Zheng Jie	6	3	7^{9}

Qualifying competition
6	(Japan) Kimiko Date-Krumm	3	6	3
18	(China) Zheng Jie	6	1	6

=== Seventh qualifier ===
First round
7	(Romania) Simona Halep	4	6	6
(Spain) Nuria Llagostera Vives	6	1	4
WC	(Canada) Sharon Fichman	2	7	6
24	(United Kingdom) Anne Keothavong	6	5	3

Qualifying competition
7	(Romania) Simona Halep	6	6
WC	(Canada) Sharon Fichman	3	1

=== Eighth qualifier ===
First round
8	(Italy) Alberta Brianti	6	7
(Belarus) Olga Govortsova	1	5
(Japan) Misaki Doi	4	3
15	(Czech Republic) Barbora Záhlavová-Strýcová	6	6

Qualifying competition
8	(Italy) Alberta Brianti	7^{8}	6^{1}	6
15	(Czech Republic) Barbora Záhlavová-Strýcová	6^{6}	7^{7}	2

=== Ninth qualifier ===
First round
9	(Romania) Monica Niculescu	6	6
WC	(Canada) Carol Zhao	3	2
(United States) Alison Riske	3	3
20	(Croatia) Petra Martić	6	6

Qualifying competition
9	(Romania) Monica Niculescu	6	3	3
20	(Croatia) Petra Martić	3	6	6

=== Tenth qualifier ===
First round
10	(United Kingdom) Elena Baltacha	6	6
(France) Aravane Rezaï	4	4
(United States) Alexa Glatch	6	6^{2}	0
14	(Hungary) Gréta Arn	3	7^{7}	6

Qualifying competition
10	(United Kingdom) Elena Baltacha	6^{5}	3
14	(Hungary) Gréta Arn	7^{7}	6

=== Eleventh qualifier ===
First round
11	(India) Sania Mirza	6	4	6
WC	(Canada) Heidi El Tabakh	0	6	0
(Germany) Kathrin Wörle	6	7
17	(Russia) Alla Kudryavtseva	2	5

Qualifying competition
11	(India) Sania Mirza	7^{7}	5	3
(Germany) Kathrin Wörle	6^{5}	7	6

=== Twelfth qualifier ===
First round
12	(Latvia) Anastasija Sevastova	1	6^{5}
(Kazakhstan) Galina Voskoboeva	6	7^{7}
(New Zealand) Marina Erakovic	2	0
13	(Ukraine) Kateryna Bondarenko	6	6

Qualifying competition
(Kazakhstan) Galina Voskoboeva	6	4	7^{7}
13	(Ukraine) Kateryna Bondarenko	3	6	6^{2}
