= 2013 Toray Pan Pacific Open – Singles =

Singles
- 2013 Toray Pan Pacific Open

Final
- Champion: (Czech Republic) Petra Kvitová
- Runner-up: (Germany) Angelique Kerber
- Score: 6–2, 0–6, 6–3

Details
- Draw: 56 (8 Q / 3 WC )
- Seeds: 16

Events
Singles	Doubles
- Pan Pacific Open

Petra Kvitová defeated Angelique Kerber in the final, 6–2, 0–6, 6–3 to win the singles tennis title at the 2013 Pan Pacific Open.

Nadia Petrova was the reigning champion, but withdrew with a left hip injury before the tournament.

== Seeds ==
The top eight seeds receive a bye into the second round.

1. (Belarus) Victoria Azarenka (second round)
2. (Poland) Agnieszka Radwańska (quarterfinals)
3. (Italy) Sara Errani (second round)
4. (Denmark) Caroline Wozniacki (semifinals)
5. (Germany) Angelique Kerber (final)
6. (Serbia) Jelena Janković (third round)
7. (Czech Republic) Petra Kvitová (champion)
8. (Italy) Roberta Vinci (second round)
9. (United States) Sloane Stephens (second round)
10. (Spain) Carla Suárez Navarro (first round)
11. (Serbia) Ana Ivanovic (third round)
12. (Australia) Samantha Stosur (third round)
13. (Romania) Simona Halep (third round)
14. (Belgium) Kirsten Flipkens (second round)
15. (Romania) Sorana Cîrstea (third round)
16. (Slovakia) Dominika Cibulková (third round)

Click on the seed number of a player to go to their draw section.

== Draw ==
Key

- Q = Qualifier
- WC = Wild card
- LL = Lucky loser
- Alt = Alternate
- ITF = ITF entry
- PR = Protected ranking
- SR = Special ranking
- SE = Special exempt
- JE = Junior exempt
- JR = Junior Accelerator Programme entrant
- CO = College Accelerator Programme entrant
- NG = Next Gen Accelerator Program entrant
- w/o = Walkover
- r = Retired
- d = Defaulted

=== Finals ===
Quarterfinals
(United States) Venus Williams	6	6^{4}	6
(Canada) Eugenie Bouchard	3	7^{7}	3
(Russia) Svetlana Kuznetsova	4	1
7	(Czech Republic) Petra Kvitová	6	6
(Czech Republic) Lucie Šafářová	6	3	2
4	(Denmark) Caroline Wozniacki	2	6	6
5	(Germany) Angelique Kerber	6	6
2	(Poland) Agnieszka Radwańska	4	4

Semifinals
(United States) Venus Williams	6	3	6^{2}
7	(Czech Republic) Petra Kvitová	3	6	7^{7}
4	(Denmark) Caroline Wozniacki	4	6^{5}
5	(Germany) Angelique Kerber	6	7^{7}

Final
7	(Czech Republic) Petra Kvitová	6	0	6
5	(Germany) Angelique Kerber	2	6	3

=== Top half ===
==== Section 1 ====
First round
(Germany) M Barthel	3	1
(United States) V Williams	6	6
(Germany) A Petkovic	4	7^{7}	6
(Russia) E Vesnina	6	6^{5}	4
(Russia) A Pavlyuchenkova	6	6^{5}	0^{r}
13	(Romania) S Halep	3	7^{7}	3
9	(United States) S Stephens	6	6
(Switzerland) S Vögele	3	2
(Canada) E Bouchard	6	6
(Puerto Rico) M Puig	0	4
(Japan) A Morita	7^{7}	6
(United Kingdom) L Robson	6^{4}	3

Second round
1	(Belarus) V Azarenka	2	4
(United States) V Williams	6	6
(Germany) A Petkovic	6^{4}	3
13	(Romania) S Halep	7^{7}	6
9	(United States) S Stephens	7	6^{7}	3
(Canada) E Bouchard	5	7^{9}	6
(Japan) A Morita	4	1
6	(Serbia) J Janković	6	6

Third round
(United States) V Williams	4	7	6
13	(Romania) S Halep	6	5	3
(Canada) E Bouchard	7	6
6	(Serbia) J Janković	5	2

Quarterfinals
(United States) V Williams	6	6^{4}	6
(Canada) E Bouchard	3	7^{7}	3

==== Section 2 ====
First round
(Russia) S Kuznetsova	6	6
Q	(Argentina) P Ormaechea	1	2
WC	(Japan) M Doi	6^{3}	6	7
(United States) V Lepchenko	7^{7}	0	5
(Germany) J Görges	4	4
15	(Romania) S Cîrstea	6	6
10	(Spain) C Suárez Navarro	7	5	2
(United States) M Keys	5	7	6
(China) S Peng	6	6
Q	(Japan) R Ozaki	2	1
WC	(Switzerland) B Bencic	6	5	7
Q	(Russia) D Gavrilova	2	7	5

Second round
3	(Italy) S Errani	4	4
(Russia) S Kuznetsova	6	6
WC	(Japan) M Doi	1	2
15	(Romania) S Cîrstea	6	6
(United States) M Keys	7	6
(China) S Peng	5	2
WC	(Switzerland) B Bencic	5	4
7	(Czech Republic) P Kvitová	7	6

Third round
(Russia) S Kuznetsova	7^{7}	6
15	(Romania) S Cîrstea	6^{3}	1
(United States) M Keys	2	2
7	(Czech Republic) P Kvitová	6	6

Quarterfinals
(Russia) S Kuznetsova	4	1
7	(Czech Republic) P Kvitová	6	6

=== Bottom half ===
==== Section 3 ====
First round
Q	(Slovenia) P Hercog	4	7^{8}	6^{2}
(Czech Republic) L Šafářová	6	6^{6}	7^{7}
Q	(Australia) A Rodionova	2	1^{r}
(Japan) K Date-Krumm	6	4
(France) A Cornet	6	4	1
12	(Australia) S Stosur	2	6	6
14	(Belgium) K Flipkens	7^{7}	7
Q	(Czech Republic) B Záhlavová-Strýcová	6^{4}	5
(Slovakia) M Rybáriková	6	5	6
(Chinese Taipei) S-w Hsieh	2	7	0
PR	(Italy) F Pennetta	6	6
(Slovakia) D Hantuchová	3	3

Second round
8	(Italy) R Vinci	5	4
(Czech Republic) L Šafářová	7	6
(Japan) K Date-Krumm	3	6^{2}
12	(Australia) S Stosur	6	7^{7}
14	(Belgium) K Flipkens	2	3
(Slovakia) M Rybáriková	6	6
PR	(Italy) F Pennetta	2	3
4	(Denmark) C Wozniacki	6	6

Third round
(Czech Republic) L Šafářová	6	6
12	(Australia) S Stosur	4	4
(Slovakia) M Rybáriková	1	1
4	(Denmark) C Wozniacki	6	6

Quarterfinals
(Czech Republic) L Šafářová	6	3	2
4	(Denmark) C Wozniacki	2	6	6

==== Section 4 ====
First round
Q	(Spain) MT Torró Flor	7^{8}	1	6
(Czech Republic) K Zakopalová	6^{6}	6	3
(Ukraine) E Svitolina	2	7	6
WC	(Japan) K Nara	6	5	3
(Germany) A Beck	1	1
11	(Serbia) A Ivanovic	6	6
16	(Slovakia) D Cibulková	6	6
(Poland) U Radwańska	3	3
(France) K Mladenovic	5	1
Q	(Australia) C Dellacqua	7	6
PR	(Canada) A Wozniak	2	6	6
(Italy) F Schiavone	6	4	2

Second round
5	(Germany) A Kerber	6	6
Q	(Spain) MT Torró Flor	0	1
(Ukraine) E Svitolina	3	0
11	(Serbia) A Ivanovic	6	6
16	(Slovakia) D Cibulková	7	6
Q	(Australia) C Dellacqua	5	3
PR	(Canada) A Wozniak	6^{5}	0
2	(Poland) A Radwańska	7^{7}	6

Third round
5	(Germany) A Kerber	6	6
11	(Serbia) A Ivanovic	4	2
16	(Slovakia) D Cibulková	3	4
2	(Poland) A Radwańska	6	6

Quarterfinals
5	(Germany) A Kerber	6	6
2	(Poland) A Radwańska	4	4

== Qualifying ==
=== Seeds ===
1. (New Zealand) Marina Erakovic (qualifying competition)
2. (Argentina) Paula Ormaechea (qualified)
3. (Spain) María Teresa Torró Flor (qualified)
4. (South Africa) Chanelle Scheepers (qualifying competition)
5. (United Kingdom) Heather Watson (qualifying competition)
6. (Slovenia) Polona Hercog (qualified)
7. (Spain) Sílvia Soler Espinosa (qualifying competition)
8. (Japan) Misaki Doi (moved to main draw as wildcard)
9. (Bulgaria) Tsvetana Pironkova (qualifying competition)
10. (Spain) Estrella Cabeza Candela (qualifying competition)
11. (Czech Republic) Barbora Záhlavová-Strýcová (qualified)
12. (Luxembourg) Mandy Minella (first round)
13. (Slovenia) Tadeja Majerič (first round)
14. (Australia) Ashleigh Barty (qualifying competition)
15. (Russia) Daria Gavrilova (qualified)
16. (Australia) Anastasia Rodionova (qualified)
17. (Czech Republic) Kristýna Plíšková (qualifying competition)

=== Qualifiers ===
1. (Australia) Anastasia Rodionova
2. (Argentina) Paula Ormaechea
3. (Spain) María Teresa Torró Flor
4. (Russia) Daria Gavrilova
5. (Czech Republic) Barbora Záhlavová-Strýcová
6. (Slovenia) Polona Hercog
7. (Japan) Risa Ozaki
8. (Australia) Casey Dellacqua

=== Qualifying draw ===
==== First qualifier ====
First round
1	(New Zealand) Marina Erakovic	7	7^{7}
(Spain) Arantxa Parra Santonja	5	6^{4}
(Japan) Miharu Imanishi	6	3	3
16	(Australia) Anastasia Rodionova	4	6	6

Qualifying competition
1	(New Zealand) Marina Erakovic	1	1
16	(Australia) Anastasia Rodionova	6	6

==== Second qualifier ====
First round
2	(Argentina) Paula Ormaechea	6	6
WC	(Japan) Akari Inoue	3	1
WC	(Japan) Aki Yamasoto	1	3
10	(Spain) Estrella Cabeza Candela	6	6

Qualifying competition
2	(Argentina) Paula Ormaechea	7^{7}	6
10	(Spain) Estrella Cabeza Candela	6^{4}	1

==== Third qualifier ====
First round
3	(Spain) María Teresa Torró Flor	6^{2}	6	6
(Japan) Erika Sema	7^{7}	3	1
WC	(Japan) Nao Hibino	5	4
14	(Australia) Ashleigh Barty	7	6

Qualifying competition
3	(Spain) María Teresa Torró Flor	6	5	7^{7}
14	(Australia) Ashleigh Barty	4	7	6^{4}

==== Fourth qualifier ====
First round
4	(South Africa) Chanelle Scheepers	6	6
WC	(Japan) Mana Ayukawa	0	2
WC	(Japan) Chiaki Okadaue	6^{3}	3
15	(Russia) Daria Gavrilova	7^{7}	6

Qualifying competition
4	(South Africa) Chanelle Scheepers	4	3
15	(Russia) Daria Gavrilova	6	6

==== Fifth qualifier ====
First round
5	(United Kingdom) Heather Watson	6	6
(Japan) Yurika Sema	1	0
(Russia) Alla Kudryavtseva	1	4
11	(Czech Republic) Barbora Záhlavová-Strýcová	6	6

Qualifying competition
5	(United Kingdom) Heather Watson	3	3
11	(Czech Republic) Barbora Záhlavová-Strýcová	6	6

==== Sixth qualifier ====
First round
6	(Slovenia) Polona Hercog	6	6
(Japan) Eri Hozumi	1	2
WC	(Japan) Emi Mutaguchi	4	3
9	(Bulgaria) Tsvetana Pironkova	6	6

Qualifying competition
6	(Slovenia) Polona Hercog	6	6
9	(Bulgaria) Tsvetana Pironkova	4	2

==== Seventh qualifier ====
First round
7	(Spain) Sílvia Soler Espinosa	6	6
WC	(Japan) Naomi Osaka	3	4
(Japan) Risa Ozaki	6	6
13	(Slovenia) Tadeja Majerič	0	4

Qualifying competition
7	(Spain) Sílvia Soler Espinosa	1	4
(Japan) Risa Ozaki	6	6

==== Eighth qualifier ====
First round
17	(Czech Republic) Kristýna Plíšková	6	3	6
(Ukraine) Olga Savchuk	2	6	3
(Australia) Casey Dellacqua	7	6
12	(Luxembourg) Mandy Minella	5	4

Qualifying competition
17	(Czech Republic) Kristýna Plíšková	3	6^{3}
(Australia) Casey Dellacqua	6	7^{7}
