= Anna-Lena Grönefeld =

German tennis player (born 1985)

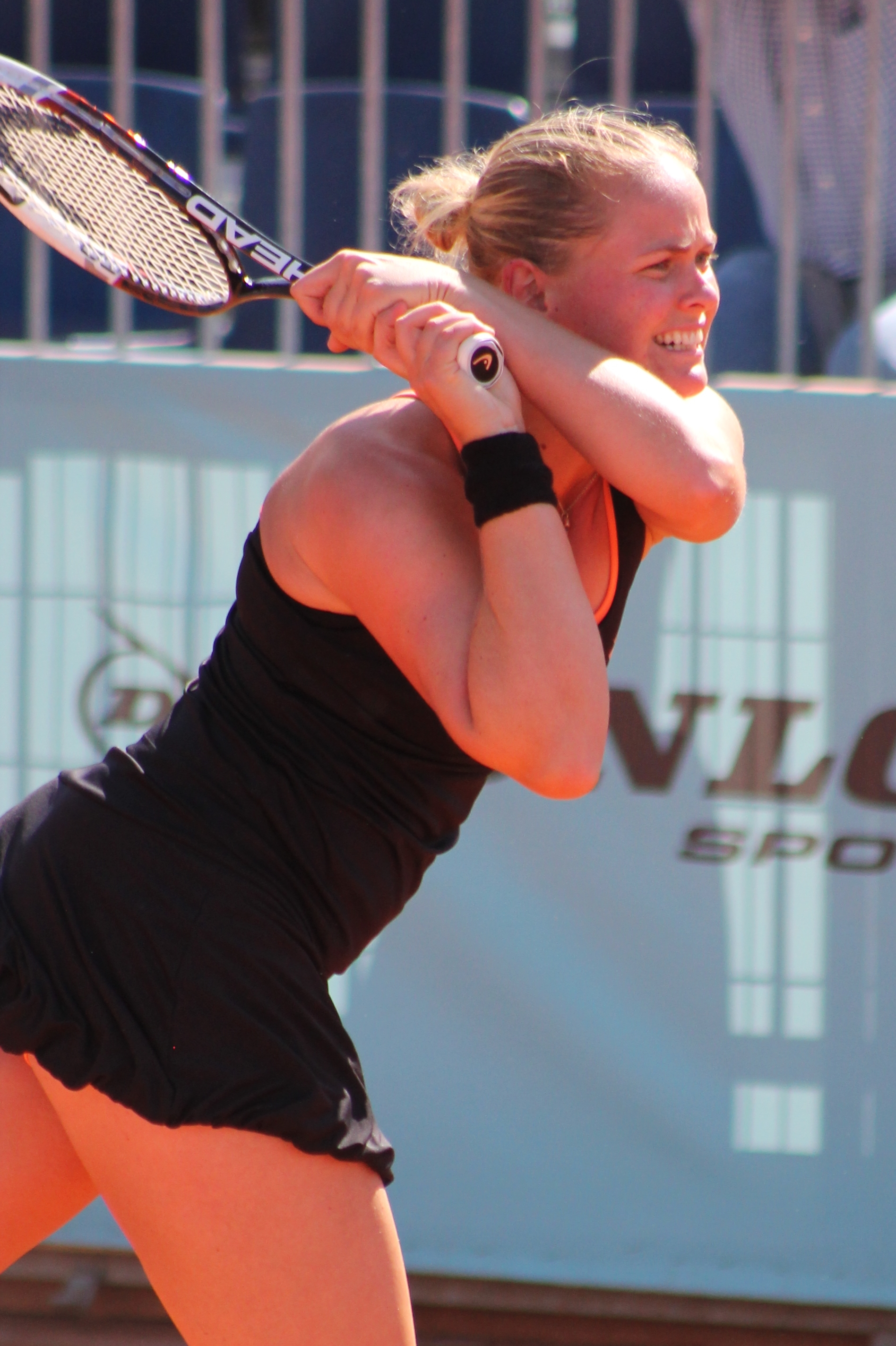
- Grönefeld at the 2014 Mutua Madrid Open
- ITF name: Anna-Lena Groenefeld
- Country (sports): Germany
- Born: 4 June 1985 (age 41) Nordhorn, West Germany
- Height: 1.80 m (5 ft 11 in)
- Turned pro: April 2003
- Retired: December 2019
- Plays: Right-handed (two-handed backhand)
- Prize money: $4,662,619

Singles
- Career record: 287–205
- Career titles: 1
- Highest ranking: No. 14 (17 April 2006)

Grand Slam singles results
- Australian Open: 3R (2005)
- French Open: QF (2006)
- Wimbledon: 1R (2004, 2005, 2006, 2007, 2009, 2010)
- US Open: 4R (2008)

Doubles
- Career record: 451–318
- Career titles: 17
- Highest ranking: No. 7 (6 March 2006)

Grand Slam doubles results
- Australian Open: SF (2006, 2015)
- French Open: QF (2009)
- Wimbledon: SF (2005, 2013, 2017)
- US Open: SF (2005, 2015)

Other doubles tournaments
- Tour Finals: SF (2019)

Mixed doubles
- Career titles: 2

Grand Slam mixed doubles results
- Australian Open: QF (2006, 2019)
- French Open: W (2014)
- Wimbledon: W (2009)
- US Open: SF (2010, 2016)

Team competitions
- Fed Cup: F (2014), record 20–18

Anna-Lena Grönefeld (also spelled Groenefeld; married name Herzgerodt; born 4 June 1985) is a German former professional tennis player.

Competing as a professional from 2003 until 2019, she won one singles title on the WTA Tour, at the 2006 Mexican Open, and reached the quarterfinals of the 2006 French Open. She is a two-time Grand Slam champion in mixed doubles, having won the 2009 Wimbledon Championships alongside Mark Knowles, and the 2014 French Open with Jean-Julien Rojer. Grönefeld also finished runner-up in mixed doubles at the 2016 Wimbledon Championships and 2017 French Open.

In women's doubles, Grönefeld won 17 career titles, most notably the 2005 Rogers Cup with Martina Navratilova, and reached seven Grand Slam semifinals. She was part of the German team which reached the final of the 2014 Fed Cup, and competed at the 2012 and 2016 Olympic Games.

== Career ==
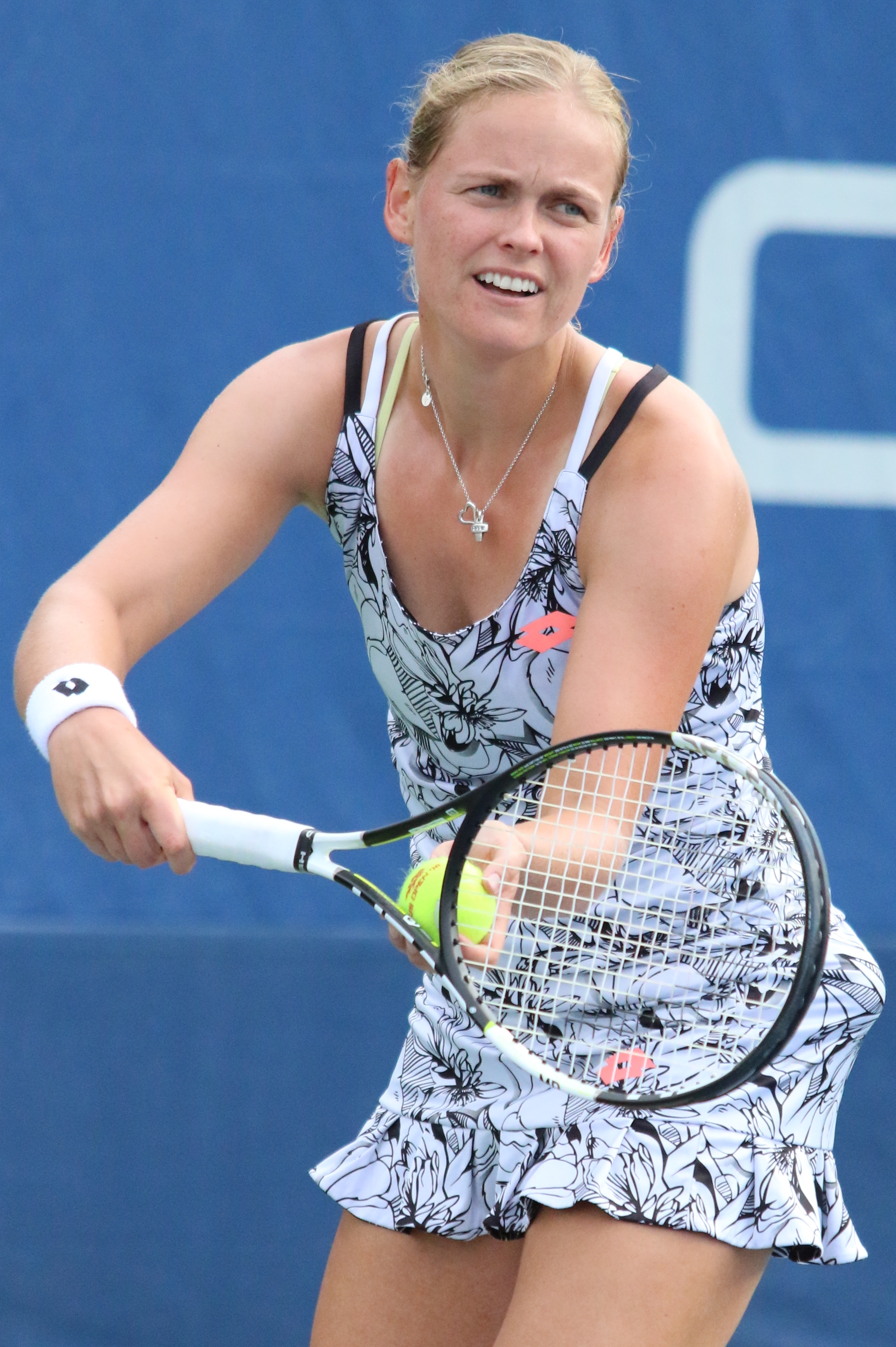
Groenefeld, 2016

=== 2002–2006: Breakthrough ===
In 2002, she was the singles champion of both the Belgium and Frankfurt International Championships and a finalist at the Orange Bowl. In June 2003, she captured the prestigious French Open junior title, becoming the first player from Germany since 1957 to accomplish this feat. In July 2003, she continued her superb form and won the Apple and Eve Newsday Long Island Classic, held in Woodbury, New York. She was also an accomplished doubles player in juniors winning the French Open title and reaching the finals at Wimbledon. As a result of her tennis success in 2003, Grönefeld had achieved the junior world ranking of No. 1 in singles and doubles. She launched her professional career debut under the direction of the USA Academy and Rafael Font de Mora.

Grönefeld made her professional breakthrough in 2005, rising 54 places throughout the year. She reached the third round of the Australian Open, French Open and the US Open and played three finals in WTA Tour events throughout the season, including at the Tier II event in Beijing, although failing to win any of them. She also rose into the top 10 in the world in doubles, cementing her position as one of the most promising young doubles players on the tour at the time.

In 2006, she represented Germany along with Nicolas Kiefer at the Hopman Cup. She went on to win her first title at the Mexican Open in Acapulco and completed a career best showing at Roland Garros, by reaching the quarterfinals, where she lost to Justine Henin. Her ranking peaked at 14, and remained in the top 20 for much of the year, despite a significant drop in results in the latter half of the season, as the German failed to progress beyond the quarterfinals of most tournaments. She split with Font de Mora in September 2006 and began to work with Dirk Dier.

=== 2007: Loss of form ===
Her run of bad form continued into 2007, and as of 19 June, Grönefeld had been eliminated in the first round of her last five tournaments. Grönefeld blamed her run of bad form on the situation with Font de Mora, suggesting that he was giving her opponents tactics on how to beat her. She also had a substantial weight gain over the past several months. Her ranking subsequently dipped below the top 100 for the first time since 2004. On 20 August 2007, Grönefeld announced that she would be taking a break from the tour, coming back in 2008.

In August 2007, it was revealed that Font de Mora was planning to sue Grönefeld for lack of discipline during their partnership, stating: "She had to adhere to a standard of performance, a standard of training and a standard of diet. She absolutely let herself go and sabotaged her marketability and her performance on the court. You work for years and invest all this money into developing contracts and developing endorsements and then she just gets around the wrong people and does the wrong things and her performance affects everything." He also denied her allegations that he interfered with her matches.

=== 2008–2009: Comeback ===
Grönefeld made her official comeback on 3 May 2008, at the $75k event in Zagreb, Croatia. She was seeded fourth in the qualifying draw, winning three consecutive matches to reach the main draw. She then won the Smart Card Open Monet+ in Zlín, Czech Republic, for the first title of her comeback. Grönefeld went on to win another two ITF title over the following fortnight: a $10k event in Alkmaar, Netherlands, and a $25k event at Périgueux, France.

Grönefeld took advantage of her feed-up wildcard into the Tier IV Gaz de France Grand Prix (a result of winning the $75k Zlín event), reaching the quarterfinals with an upset win over Lucie Šafářová. She then played in Bad Gastein, where she was defeated in three tight sets in the second round by Pauline Parmentier.

Her good form allowed Grönefeld to win another $50k event in Rimini at the beginning of August. She also reached the final of a $50k Bronx Open, where she lost to Elena Bovina.

After winning her three qualification rounds, Grönefeld played at the 2008 US Open, and reached the fourth round of the main draw, only losing to Dinara Safina. Prior to her loss to Safina, Grönefeld had won six matches in a row without losing a single set, the highlights being her victory over Daniela Hantuchová in the first round and over Alizé Cornet in the third round, both top 20 players at the time.

After losing against Austrian runner-up Tamira Paszek in the first round in Bali, Grönefeld received a wildcard for the Porsche Tennis Grand Prix in Stuttgart but lost in the first round against Venus Williams. With her doubles partner, Patty Schnyder, Grönefeld, however, won the doubles competition against the top seeds Květa Peschke and Rennae Stubbs.

After winning the first two matches at the qualification for the Zurich Open, Grönefeld lost her third match against Petra Kvitová. With doubles partner Patty Schnyder she reached the finals.

== Performance timelines ==
Key
W	F	SF	QF	#R	RR	Q#	P#	DNQ	A	Z#	PO	G	S	B	NMS	NTI	P	NH

(W) winner; (F) finalist; (SF) semifinalist; (QF) quarterfinalist; (#R) rounds 4, 3, 2, 1; (RR) round-robin stage; (Q#) qualification round; (P#) preliminary round; (DNQ) did not qualify; (A) absent; (Z#) Davis/Fed Cup Zonal Group (with number indication) or (PO) play-off; (G) gold, (S) silver or (B) bronze Olympic/Paralympic medal; (NMS) not a Masters tournament; (NTI) not a Tier I tournament; (P) postponed; (NH) not held; (SR) strike rate (events won / competed); (W–L) win–loss record.

Only main-draw results in WTA Tour, Grand Slam tournaments, Fed Cup and Olympic Games are included in win–loss records.

=== Singles ===
Tournament	2003	2004	2005	2006	2007	2008	2009	2010	2011	SR	W–L
Grand Slam tournaments
Australian Open	A	Q3	3R	2R	2R	A	1R	1R	Q2	0 / 5	4–5
French Open	A	2R	3R	QF	1R	A	2R	A	A	0 / 5	8–5
Wimbledon	A	1R	1R	1R	1R	A	1R	1R	Q1	0 / 6	0–6
US Open	Q2	1R	3R	1R	A	4R	1R	Q2	Q1	0 / 5	5–5
Win–loss	0–0	1–3	6–4	5–4	1–3	3–1	1–4	0–2	0–0	0 / 21	17–21
Career statistics
Titles / Finals	0 / 0	0 / 0	0 / 3	1 / 1	0 / 0	0 / 0	0 / 0	0 / 0	0 / 0	1 / 4	
Overall win–loss	3–6	7–19	40–25	31–27	6–15	7–7	20–25	6–11	0–2	120–137	
Year-end ranking	120	75	21	19	205	77	67	169	263	47%	

=== Doubles ===
Tournament	2003	2004	2005	2006	2007	2008	2009	2010	2011	2012	2013	2014	2015	2016	2017	2018	2019	SR	W–L
Grand Slam tournaments
Australian Open	A	A	3R	SF	QF	A	QF	2R	3R	1R	2R	2R	SF	QF	3R	3R	1R	0 / 14	27–13
French Open	A	A	3R	2R	1R	A	QF	A	2R	2R	2R	1R	2R	1R	1R	2R	2R	0 / 13	12–13
Wimbledon	A	A	SF	QF	2R	A	QF	A	2R	3R	SF	QF	3R	QF	SF	2R	QF	0 / 13	34–13
US Open	A	2R	SF	2R	A	3R	3R	3R	2R	1R	3R	1R	SF	1R	1R	3R	2R	0 / 15	22–15
Win–loss	0–0	1–1	12–4	9–4	4–3	2–1	11–4	3–2	5–4	3–4	8–3	4–4	11–4	5–4	6–4	6–4	5–4	0 / 55	95–54
Year-end championships
WTA Finals	did not qualify														QF	DNQ	SF	0 / 2	2–3
National representation
Summer Olympics	NH	A	not held			A	not held			2R	not held			1R	not held			0 / 2	1–2
Fed Cup	A	1R	PO	1R	PO	1R	PO	1R	PO	1R	PO	F	A	1R	A	SF	1R	0 / 9	9–11
Premier Mandatory tournaments
Indian Wells Open	A	A	QF	QF	A	A	1R	A	A	2R	A	2R	1R	1R	1R	2R	1R	0 / 10	7–10
Miami Open	A	A	1R	1R	A	A	SF	A	A	2R	2R	2R	2R	1R	2R	QF	1R	0 / 11	10–11
Madrid Open	not held						1R	A	A	2R	1R	2R	2R	1R	QF	1R	QF	0 / 9	7–9
China Open	Tier II						QF	A	A	QF	1R	1R	2R	1R	2R	2R	QF	0 / 9	9–9
Premier 5 tournaments
Dubai / Qatar Open	Tier II					A	A	1R	A	SF	SF	2R	QF	1R	2R	1R	QF	0 / 9	12–9
Italian Open	A	A	SF	2R	2R	A	A	A	A	1R	2R	SF	2R	2R	2R	SF	F	0 / 11	18–11
Canadian Open	A	A	W	F	A	A	1R	1R	A	A	F	1R	1R	2R	F	1R	F	1 / 11	21–10
Cincinnati Open	NH	Tier III					1R	A	A	A	F	1R	1R	2R	1R	1R	F	0 / 8	8–8
Tokyo / Wuhan Open	A	A	A	A	A	A	1R	A	A	F	QF	2R	1R	1R	QF	1R	SF	0 / 9	9–9
Former Tier I tournaments
Charleston Open	A	A	2R	SF	A	A	not Premier 5											0 / 2	2–1
German Open	1R	1R	1R	SF	2R	A	not held											0 / 5	3–5
San Diego Open	T II	A	1R	F	A	not held / not Premier 5												0 / 2	3–2
Kremlin Cup	A	A	1R	QF	A	A	not Premier 5											0 / 2	1–1
Zurich Open	A	1R	A	QF	A	T II	not held											0 / 2	1–2
Career statistics
	2003	2004	2005	2006	2007	2008	2009	2010	2011	2012	2013	2014	2015	2016	2017	2018	2019	Career	
Tournaments	4	10	21	24	14	8	23	12	11	21	22	24	24	26	23	24	22	313	
Titles	0	0	3	2	1	2	2	1	0	1	1	1	0	0	1	1	1	17	
Finals	0	4	3	5	1	3	2	2	2	5	5	1	0	1	2	2	6	44	
Overall win–loss	1–4	19–11	38–16	40–20	14–13	14–7	26–20	15–11	17–11	31–20	37–21	21–24	23–23	22–27	29–22	24–24	36–24	407–298	
Win %	20%	63%	70%	67%	52%	67%	57%	58%	61%	61%	64%	47%	50%	45%	57%	50%	60%	58%	
Year-end ranking	264	47	11	11	52	56	25	56	53	18	15	36	22	28	21	26	11		

=== Mixed doubles ===
Tournament	2005	2006	2007	2008	2009	2010	2011	2012	2013	2014	2015	2016	2017	2018	2019	SR	W–L
Australian Open	A	QF	1R	A	1R	2R	A	A	A	2R	1R	2R	1R	1R	QF	0 / 10	7–10
French Open	1R	A	A	A	SF	A	A	2R	2R	W	2R	1R	F	SF	2R	1 / 10	19–9
Wimbledon	3R	QF	1R	A	W	A	A	3R	3R	A	2R	F	2R	2R	A	1 / 10	13–9
US Open	2R	QF	A	A	2R	SF	A	A	1R	1R	A	SF	1R	2R	1R	0 / 10	11–10
Win–loss	2–3	5–3	0–2	0–0	9–3	4–2	0–0	2–2	2–3	6–2	1–3	8–4	4–4	4–4	3–3	2 / 40	50–38

== Grand Slam tournament finals ==
=== Mixed doubles: 4 (2 titles, 2 runner-ups) ===
Result	Year	Tournament	Surface	Partner	Opponents	Score
Win	2009	Wimbledon	Grass	(The Bahamas) Mark Knowles	(India) Leander Paes (Zimbabwe) Cara Black	7–5, 6–3
Win	2014	French Open	Clay	(Netherlands) Jean-Julien Rojer	(Germany) Julia Görges (Serbia) Nenad Zimonjić	4–6, 6–2, [10–7]
Loss	2016	Wimbledon	Grass	(Colombia) Robert Farah	(Finland) Henri Kontinen (United Kingdom) Heather Watson	6–7^{(5–7)}, 4–6
Loss	2017	French Open	Clay	(Colombia) Robert Farah	(Canada) Gabriela Dabrowski (India) Rohan Bopanna	6–2, 2–6, [10–12]

== Other significant finals ==
=== Premier Mandatory / Premier 5 tournaments ===
==== Doubles: 10 (1 title, 9 runner-ups) ====
Result	Year	Tournament	Surface	Partner	Opponents	Score
Win	2005	Toronto	Hard	(United States) Martina Navratilova	(Spain) Conchita Martínez (Spain) Virginia Ruano Pascual	5–7, 6–3, 6–4
Loss	2006	San Diego	Hard	(United States) Meghann Shaughnessy	(Zimbabwe) Cara Black (Australia) Rennae Stubbs	2–6, 2–6
Loss	2006	Toronto	Hard	(Zimbabwe) Cara Black	(United States) Martina Navratilova (Russia) Nadia Petrova	1–6, 2–6
Loss	2012	Tokyo	Hard	(Czech Republic) Květa Peschke	(United States) Raquel Kops-Jones (United States) Abigail Spears	1–6, 4–6
Loss	2013	Toronto	Hard	(Czech Republic) Květa Peschke	(Serbia) Jelena Janković (Slovenia) Katarina Srebotnik	7–5, 2–6, [6–10]
Loss	2013	Cincinnati	Hard	(Czech Republic) Květa Peschke	(Chinese Taipei) Hsieh Su-wei (China) Peng Shuai	6–2, 3–6, [10–12]
Loss	2017	Toronto	Hard	(Czech Republic) Květa Peschke	(Russia) Ekaterina Makarova (Russia) Elena Vesnina	0–6, 4–6
Loss	2019	Rome	Clay	(Netherlands) Demi Schuurs	(Belarus) Victoria Azarenka (Australia) Ashleigh Barty	6–4, 0–6, [3–10]
Loss	2019	Toronto	Hard	(Netherlands) Demi Schuurs	(Czech Republic) Barbora Krejčíková (Czech Republic) Kateřina Siniaková	5–7, 0–6
Loss	2019	Cincinnati	Hard	(Netherlands) Demi Schuurs	(Czech Republic) Lucie Hradecká (Slovenia) Andreja Klepač	4–6, 1–6

== WTA Tour finals ==
=== Singles: 4 (1 title, 3 runner-ups) ===
Legend Grand Slam tournaments (0–0) Tier I / Premier M & Premier 5 (0–0) Tier II / Premier (0–2) Tier III, IV & V / International (1–1)	Finals by surface Hard (0–3) Clay (1–0) Grass (0–0) Carpet (0–0)

Result	W–L	Date	Tournament	Tier	Surface	Opponent	Score
Loss	0–1	Feb 2005	Pattaya Open, Thailand	Tier IV	Hard	(Spain) Conchita Martínez	3–6, 6–3, 3–6
Loss	0–2	Sep 2005	China Open, Beijing	Tier II	Hard	(Russia) Maria Kirilenko	3–6, 4–6
Loss	0–3	Oct 2005	Luxembourg Open, Luxembourg City	Tier II	Hard (i)	(Belgium) Kim Clijsters	2–6, 4–6
Win	1–3	Mar 2006	Mexican Open, Acapulco	Tier III	Clay	(Italy) Flavia Pennetta	6–1, 4–6, 6–2

=== Doubles: 44 (17 titles, 27 runner-ups) ===
Legend Grand Slam tournaments (0–0) Tier I / Premier M & Premier 5 (1–9) Tier II / Premier (7–8) Tier III, IV & V / International (9–10)	Finals by surface Hard (11–22) Clay (5–4) Grass (0–1) Carpet (1–0)

Result	W–L	Date	Tournament	Tier	Surface	Partner	Opponents	Score
Loss	0–1	Aug 2004	Nordic Light Open, Sweden	Tier IV	Hard	(Switzerland) Emmanuelle Gagliardi	(Australia) Alicia Molik (Austria) Barbara Schett	3–6, 3–6
Loss	0–2	Aug 2004	Vancouver Open, Canada	Tier V	Hard	(Belgium) Els Callens	(United States) Bethanie Mattek-Sands (United States) Abigail Spears	3–6, 3–6
Loss	0–3	Aug 2004	Cincinnati Open, United States	Tier III	Hard	(Switzerland) Emmanuelle Gagliardi	(Germany) Marlene Weingärtner (United States) Jill Craybas	5–7, 6–7^{(2–7)}
Loss	0–4	Oct 2004	Filderstadt Open, Germany	Tier II	Hard (i)	(Germany) Julia Schruff	(Zimbabwe) Cara Black (Australia) Rennae Stubbs	3–6, 2–6
Win	1–4	Feb 2005	Pattaya Open, Thailand	Tier IV	Hard	(France) Marion Bartoli	(Poland) Marta Domachowska (Croatia) Silvija Talaja	6–3, 6–2
Win	2–4	Aug 2005	Canadian Open, Toronto	Tier I	Hard	(United States) Martina Navratilova	(Spain) Conchita Martínez (Spain) Virginia Ruano Pascual	5–7, 6–3, 6–4
Win	3–4	Sep 2005	Bali International, Indonesia	Tier III	Hard	(United States) Meghann Shaughnessy	(China) Yan Zi (China) Zheng Jie	6–3, 6–3
Win	4–4	Mar 2006	Mexican Open, Acapulco	Tier III	Clay	(United States) Meghann Shaughnessy	(Japan) Shinobu Asagoe (France) Émilie Loit	6–1, 6–3
Win	5–4	Jul 2006	Stanford Classic, United States	Tier II	Hard	(Israel) Shahar Pe'er	(Italy) Maria Elena Camerin (Argentina) Gisela Dulko	6–1, 6–4
Loss	5–5	Aug 2006	San Diego Open, United States	Tier I	Hard	(United States) Meghann Shaughnessy	(Zimbabwe) Cara Black (Australia) Rennae Stubbs	2–6, 2–6
Loss	5–6	Aug 2006	Canadian Open, Montreal	Tier I	Hard	(Zimbabwe) Cara Black	(United States) Martina Navratilova (Russia) Nadia Petrova	1–6, 2–6
Loss	5–7	Oct 2006	Luxembourg Open	Tier II	Hard (i)	(South Africa) Liezel Huber	(Czech Republic) Květa Peschke (Italy) Francesca Schiavone	6–2, 4–6, 1–6
Win	6–7	Jan 2007	Sydney International, Australia	Tier II	Hard	(United States) Meghann Shaughnessy	(France) Marion Bartoli (United States) Meilen Tu	6–3, 3–6, 7–6^{(7–2)}
Win	7–7	Oct 2008	Stuttgart Open, Germany	Tier II	Hard (i)	(Switzerland) Patty Schnyder	(Czech Republic) Květa Peschke (Australia) Rennae Stubbs	6–2, 6–4
Loss	7–8	Oct 2008	Zurich Open, Switzerland	Tier II	Hard (i)	(Switzerland) Patty Schnyder	(Zimbabwe) Cara Black (United States) Liezel Huber	1–6, 6–7^{(3–7)}
Win	8–8	Nov 2008	Tournoi de Québec, Canada	Tier III	Carpet (i)	(United States) Vania King	(United States) Jill Craybas (Thailand) Tamarine Tanasugarn	7–6^{(7–3)}, 6–4
Win	9–8	Jan 2009	Brisbane International, Australia	International	Hard	(United States) Vania King	(Poland) Klaudia Jans (Poland) Alicja Rosolska	3–6, 7–5, [10–5]
Win	10–8	Oct 2009	Linz Open, Austria	International	Hard (i)	(Slovenia) Katarina Srebotnik	(Poland) Klaudia Jans (Poland) Alicja Rosolska	6–1, 6–4
Loss	10–9	Mar 2010	Monterrey Open, Mexico	International	Hard	(United States) Vania King	(Czech Republic) Iveta Benešová (Czech Republic) Barbora Strýcová	6–3, 4–6, [8–10]
Win	11–9	Aug 2010	Danish Open, Denmark	International	Hard (i)	(Germany) Julia Görges	(Russia) Vitalia Diatchenko (Belarus) Tatiana Poutchek	6–4, 6–4
Loss	11–10	Mar 2011	Monterrey Open, Mexico	International	Hard	(United States) Vania King	(Czech Republic) Iveta Benešová (Czech Republic) Barbora Strýcová	7–6^{(10–8)}, 2–6, [6–10]
Loss	11–11	Oct 2011	Linz Open, Austria	International	Hard (i)	(Germany) Julia Görges	(New Zealand) Marina Erakovic (Russia) Elena Vesnina	5–7, 1–6
Loss	11–12	Feb 2012	Open GDF Suez, France	Premier	Hard (i)	(Croatia) Petra Martić	(United States) Liezel Huber (United States) Lisa Raymond	6–7^{(3–7)}, 1–6
Loss	11–13	Apr 2012	Stuttgart Open, Germany	Premier	Clay (i)	(Germany) Julia Görges	(Czech Republic) Iveta Benešová (Czech Republic) Barbora Strýcová	4–6, 5–7
Loss	11–14	Jun 2012	Gastein Ladies, Austria	International	Clay	(Croatia) Petra Martić	(United States) Jill Craybas (Germany) Julia Görges	7–6^{(7–4)}, 4–6, [9–11]
Loss	11–15	Sep 2012	Pan Pacific Open, Japan	Premier 5	Hard	(Czech Republic) Květa Peschke	(United States) Raquel Kops-Jones (United States) Abigail Spears	1–6, 4–6
Win	12–15	Oct 2012	Linz Open (2), Austria	International	Hard (i)	(Czech Republic) Květa Peschke	(Germany) Julia Görges (Czech Republic) Barbora Strýcová	6–3, 6–4
Loss	12–16	Jan 2013	Brisbane International, Australia	Premier	Hard	(Czech Republic) Květa Peschke	(United States) Bethanie Mattek-Sands (India) Sania Mirza	6–4, 4–6, [7–10]
Win	13–16	May 2013	Brussels Open, Belgium	Premier	Clay	(Czech Republic) Květa Peschke	(Canada) Gabriela Dabrowski (Israel) Shahar Pe'er	6–0, 6–3
Loss	13–17	Jun 2013	Nuremberg Cup, Germany	International	Clay	(Czech Republic) Květa Peschke	(Romania) Raluca Olaru (Russia) Valeria Solovyeva	6–2, 6–7^{(3–7)}, [9–11]
Loss	13–18	Aug 2013	Canadian Open, Toronto	Premier 5	Hard	(Czech Republic) Květa Peschke	(Serbia) Jelena Janković (Slovenia) Katarina Srebotnik	7–5, 2–6, [6–10]
Loss	13–19	Aug 2013	Cincinnati Open, United States	Premier 5	Hard	(Czech Republic) Květa Peschke	(Chinese Taipei) Hsieh Su-wei (China) Peng Shuai	6–2, 3–6, [10–12]
Win	14–19	Feb 2014	Open GDF Suez, France	Premier	Hard (i)	(Czech Republic) Květa Peschke	(Hungary) Tímea Babos (France) Kristina Mladenovic	6–7^{(7–9)}, 6–4, [10–5]
Loss	14–20	Oct 2016	Linz Open, Austria	International	Hard (i)	(Czech Republic) Květa Peschke	(Netherlands) Kiki Bertens (Sweden) Johanna Larsson	6–4, 2–6, [7–10]
Win	15–20	May 2017	Prague Open, Czech Republic	International	Clay	(Czech Republic) Květa Peschke	(Czech Republic) Lucie Hradecká (Czech Republic) Kateřina Siniaková	6–4, 7–6^{(7–3)}
Loss	15–21	Aug 2017	Canadian Open, Toronto	Premier 5	Hard	(Czech Republic) Květa Peschke	(Russia) Ekaterina Makarova (Russia) Elena Vesnina	0–6, 4–6
Win	16–21	Apr 2018	Stuttgart Open (2), Germany	Premier	Clay (i)	(United States) Raquel Atawo	(United States) Nicole Melichar (Czech Republic) Květa Peschke	6–4, 6–7^{(5–7)}, [10–5]
Loss	16–22	Oct 2018	Linz Open, Austria	International	Hard (i)	(United States) Raquel Atawo	(Belgium) Kirsten Flipkens (Sweden) Johanna Larsson	6–4, 4–6, [5–10]
Loss	16–23	Feb 2019	Qatar Ladies Open, Doha	Premier	Hard	(Netherlands) Demi Schuurs	(Chinese Taipei) Chan Hao-ching (Chinese Taipei) Latisha Chan	1–6, 6–3, [6–10]
Win	17–23	Apr 2019	Charleston Open, United States	Premier	Clay	(Poland) Alicja Rosolska	(Russia) Irina Khromacheva (Russia) Veronika Kudermetova	7–6^{(9–7)}, 6–2
Loss	17–24	May 2019	Italian Open, Rome	Premier 5	Clay	(Netherlands) Demi Schuurs	(Belarus) Victoria Azarenka (Australia) Ashleigh Barty	6–4, 0–6, [3–10]
Loss	17–25	Jun 2019	Birmingham Classic, United Kingdom	Premier	Grass	(Netherlands) Demi Schuurs	(Chinese Taipei) Hsieh Su-wei (Czech Republic) Barbora Strýcová	4–6, 7–6^{(7–4)}, [8–10]
Loss	17–26	Aug 2019	Canadian Open, Toronto	Premier 5	Hard	(Netherlands) Demi Schuurs	(Czech Republic) Barbora Krejčíková (Czech Republic) Kateřina Siniaková	5–7, 0–6
Loss	17–27	Aug 2019	Cincinnati Open, United States	Premier 5	Hard	(Netherlands) Demi Schuurs	(Czech Republic) Lucie Hradecká (Slovenia) Andreja Klepač	4–6, 1–6

=== WTA Challenger finals ===
==== Doubles: 1 (title) ====
Result	W–L	Date	Tournament	Surface	Partner	Opponents	Score
Win	1–0	Mar 2016	San Antonio Open, United States	Hard	(United States) Nicole Melichar	(Poland) Klaudia Jans-Ignacik (Australia) Anastasia Rodionova	6–1, 6–3

== ITF finals ==
=== Singles (12–2) ===
$100,000 tournaments
$75,000 tournaments
$50,000 tournaments
$25,000 tournaments
$10,000 tournaments

Outcome	No.	Date	Tournament	Surface	Opponent	Score
Winner	1.	4 August 2002	ITF Bad Saulgau, Germany	Clay	(Croatia) Ivana Zupa	6–3, 6–4
Winner	2.	26 January 2003	ITF Hull, United Kingdom	Hard (i)	(Netherlands) Tessy van de Ven	7–6^{(4)}, 6–3
Winner	3.	15 June 2003	ITF Hamilton, Canada	Clay	(Canada) Beier Ko	6–3, 6–3
Winner	4.	13 July 2003	Vancouver Open, Canada	Hard	(Puerto Rico) Vilmarie Castellvi	6–2, 6–4
Winner	5.	20 July 2003	ITF Oyster Bay, United States	Hard	(United States) Bethanie Mattek-Sands	6–3, 6–0
Runner-up	6.	2 May 2004	Open de Cagnes-sur-Mer, France	Clay	(France) Séverine Beltrame	4–6, 4–6
Winner	7.	26 July 2004	ITF Modena, Italy	Clay	(Tunisia) Selima Sfar	6–2, 6–4
Winner	8.	7 September 2004	Open Denain, France	Clay	(Madagascar) Dally Randriantefy	6–3, 6–2
Winner	9.	15 June 2008	ITF Zlín, Czech Republic	Clay	(Croatia) Jelena Kostanić Tošić	6–3, 4–6, 6–1
Winner	10.	22 June 2008	ITF Alkmaar, Netherlands	Clay	(Netherlands) Marlot Meddens	6–1, 6–1
Winner	11.	29 June 2008	ITF Périgueux, France	Clay	(France) Florence Haring	6–3, 6–3
Winner	12.	3 August 2008	ITF Rimini, Italy	Clay	(Spain) Lourdes Domínguez Lino	6–1, 6–2
Runner-up	13.	17 August 2008	Bronx Open, United States	Hard	(Russia) Elena Bovina	3–6, 5–7
Winner	14.	23 April 2011	ITF Tessenderlo, Belgium	Clay (i)	(Belgium) Alison Van Uytvanck	6–3, 7–5

=== Doubles (6–1) ===
Outcome	No.	Date	Tournament	Surface	Partner	Opponents	Score
Winner	1.	13 September 2004	Open Denain, France	Clay	(Ukraine) Yuliana Fedak	(Bulgaria) Lubomira Bacheva (Czech Republic) Michaela Paštiková	1–6, 6–1, 6–2
Winner	2.	29 June 2008	ITF Périgueux, France	Clay	(Turkey) İpek Şenoğlu	(China) Han Xinyun (China) Xu Yifan	6–3, 6–4
Winner	3.	29 August 2009	Bronx Open, United States	Hard	(United States) Vania King	(France) Julie Coin (Canada) Marie-Ève Pelletier	6–0, 6–3
Winner	4.	1 November 2010	Ismaning Open, Germany	Carpet (i)	(Germany) Kristina Barrois	(Ukraine) Tetyana Arefyeva (Ukraine) Yuliana Fedak	6–1, 7–6^{(3)}
Winner	5.	22 April 2011	ITF Tessenderlo, Belgium	Clay	(Germany) Tatjana Malek	(Ukraine) Elina Svitolina (Ukraine) Maryna Zanevska	7–5, 6–3
Winner	6.	8 May 2011	Open de Cagnes-sur-Mer, France	Clay	(Croatia) Petra Martić	(Croatia) Darija Jurak (Czech Republic) Renata Voráčová	1–6, 6–2, [11–9]
Runner-up	7.	24 July 2011	ITF Pétange, Luxembourg	Clay	(Germany) Kristina Barrois	(Sweden) Johanna Larsson (Germany) Jasmin Wöhr	6–7^{(2)}, 4–6

== Fed Cup statistics ==
	2004	2005	2006	2007	2008	2009	2010	2011	2012	2013	2014	2015	2016	2017	2018	2019	Overall
Singles
Played	4	4	2	2	0	4	2	0	0	0	0	0	0	0	0	0	18
Win	0	4	1	2	0	2	2	0	0	0	0	0	0	0	0	0	11
Loss	4	0	1	0	0	2	0	0	0	0	0	0	0	0	0	0	7
Doubles
Played	1	1	1	1	1	2	1	2	1	2	2	0	1	0	2	2	20
Win	0	1	1	1	0	2	0	2	0	1	0	0	0	0	1	0	9
Loss	1	0	0	0	1	0	1	0	1	1	2	0	1	0	1	2	11
