= Anastasia Rodionova =

Russian-Australian tennis player (born 1982)

Anastasia Rodionova Анастасия Родионова
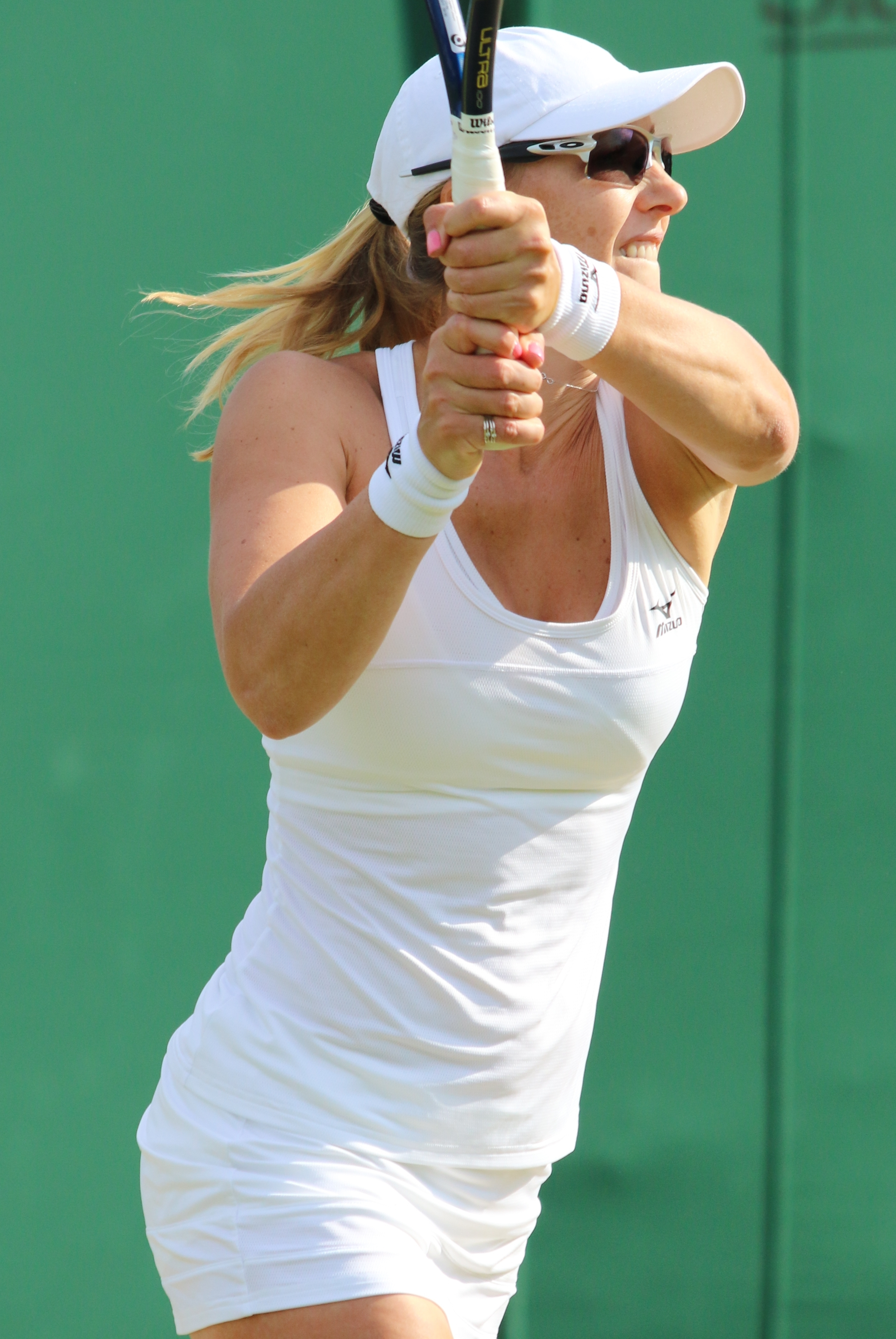
- Rodionova at the 2017 Wimbledon Championships
- Country (sports): Russia (1997–2009); Australia (2009–2023)
- Born: 12 May 1982 (age 44) Tambov, Soviet Union
- Height: 167 cm (5 ft 6 in)
- Turned pro: May 1997
- Retired: August 2023
- Plays: Right (two-handed backhand)
- Prize money: $3,680,801
- Official website: rodionova.com

Singles
- Career record: 465–431
- Career titles: 8 ITF
- Highest ranking: 62 (16 August 2010)

Grand Slam singles results
- Australian Open: 2R (2007, 2008)
- French Open: 3R (2010, 2011)
- Wimbledon: 3R (2010)
- US Open: 3R (2006, 2009)

Doubles
- Career record: 455–438
- Career titles: 11 WTA, 13 ITF
- Highest ranking: 15 (8 September 2014)

Grand Slam doubles results
- Australian Open: QF (2011, 2016)
- French Open: QF (2011, 2012)
- Wimbledon: QF (2002, 2011, 2014)
- US Open: SF (2010)

Other doubles tournaments
- Tour Finals: SF (2014)

Grand Slam mixed doubles results
- Australian Open: QF (2011)
- French Open: QF (2015)
- Wimbledon: F (2003)
- US Open: SF (2017)

Team competitions
- Fed Cup: 2–4
Medal record
Representing Australia
Commonwealth Games
Gold medal – first place	2010 Delhi	Singles
Gold medal – first place	2010 Delhi	Women's Doubles
Silver medal – second place	2010 Delhi	Mixed Doubles

Anastasia Ivanovna Rodionova (Russian: Анастасия Ивановна Родионова; born 12 May 1982) is a Russian-born Australian former professional tennis player.

Rodionova won eleven doubles titles on the WTA Tour, as well as eight singles and 13 doubles titles on the ITF Circuit. On 16 August 2010, she reached her career-high singles ranking of world No. 62. On 8 September 2014, she peaked at No. 15 in the doubles rankings.

Her greatest career achievements came in doubles, having reached the finals of the mixed-doubles event at the 2003 Wimbledon Championships with Andy Ram and the semifinals of the women's doubles event at the 2010 US Open with Cara Black.

Rodionova suffers the ignominious distinction of being one of just four players in WTA history to be defaulted from a tournament, after hitting a ball towards spectators at the 2007 Western & Southern Open.

Her younger sister Arina is also a tennis professional, and the two sisters have intermittently contested doubles tournaments together, with modest success. Their most notable achievements as a team came at the 2010 Malaysian Open and 2015 Monterrey Open, succumbing in the super tie-break in the finals of both tournaments.

== Biography ==
Rodionova started to play tennis at age seven, but she was introduced to tennis much earlier. Her father Ivan was an amateur player so instead of toys, Rodionova had tennis balls in her pram. He coached her until 18 years old when she left Tambov and moved to Germany to practice for three years before returning to Moscow in 2003. She has resided in Melbourne since 2005. Her sister Arina has also been a professional tennis player since 2004.

== Career ==
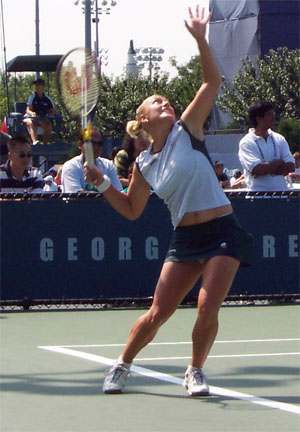
Rodionova at the 2004 US Open

=== 2006–2007 ===
In 2006, after reaching the second round in the second tournament in Los Angeles, Rodionova entered the top 100 for the first time in her career. At the US Open, she became one of the leading players after making it to the third round (her best result in singles at a Grand Slam tournament to date). This catapulted Rodionova to 81 in the world. In doubles with Elena Vesnina, she also reached the WTA tournament final in Bangalore, India and she captured her 11th ITF title in Italy in partnership with her sister Arina. In 2007, Rodionova played a whopping 28 WTA tournaments. At the Australian Open, she reached the second round but lost to world No. 2 and eventual finalist, Maria Sharapova. In Miami's Tier-I tournament, Rodionova took more games off the eventual tournament champion Serena Williams in her second-round defeat than any other player in that tournament. At the Estoril Open, Rodionova won her second title in doubles with Andreea Ehritt-Vanc from Romania. Together they also made the finals in Morocco. In the first Tier-level tournament in Los Angeles, Rodionova made the semifinals, partnering Tatiana Poutchek. In Guangzhou, she reached the singles semifinal but was unable to finish the match due to heat stroke. At the Tashkent Open, Rodionova once again teamed up with Tatiana Poutchek making the final, but lost in three sets to Ekaterina Dzehalevich and Anastasiya Yakimova. She ended the year ranked 78th place in singles.

=== 2008 ===
Rodionova started the new season in New Zealand, but she was forced to retire in the opening round due to eye problems, where she was experiencing double vision. After a short-course of treatment in Melbourne, Rodionova began preparations for the Australian Open. There, she played under the Australian flag for the first time and reached the second round, losing to Katarina Srebotnik. ((cn)) In the next few tournaments of Pattaya, Doha and Dubai, Rodionova struggled with her vision with three first-round defeats in singles, but made a doubles semifinal with Arina at the Pattaya Open. Then success increased remarkably, resulting in her gaining several considerable victories over the multiple top-30 players. In India, she defeated the No. 20 in the world, Sybille Bammer from Austria, on the way to the quarterfinal, where she went down to Serena Williams. She carried that confidence through the US series, passing qualification in Miami and reaching the second round, and making the third round in Charleston, losing to Jelena Janković.

May 2008 saw the beginning of a spate of injuries that significantly hampered the rest of the year, taking first-round honours in tournaments that she would have otherwise performed much more brightly. Movement did not restrict her as much in doubles and she made quarterfinals in a Moscow ITF, semifinals in New Haven, third round in the US Open, and semifinals in Guangzhou. However, it was clear that without major hip surgery, her career would forever be handicapped.

So Rodionova underwent major hip surgery in September 2008 in Melbourne to treat an injury that she had carried since Wimbledon 2003.

=== 2009 ===
Results were restricted significantly for the first half of the year, while Rodionova strengthened her hip and built on-court fitness following the hip operation. She sustained a badly sprained ankle during first-round singles at Los Angeles in July and was forced to retire. Rodionova represented Australia at the US Open and equalled her career-best third round in singles before returning home to Melbourne to receive intensive treatment on a heavily injured ankle and torn leg muscle. She withdrew from the tournament in Seoul to complete treatment and rejoined the WTA Tour in Tokyo. Her final tournament for 2009 was in Poitiers, France and she ended the season ranked back inside the top 100 at No. 97.

=== 2010 ===
Rodionova started the year at the Brisbane Open, falling in qualifying but making the doubles final. Then she played Sydney, where she fell in the last round of qualifying to Kimiko Date-Krumm. At the Australian Open, Rodionova lost to Svetlana Kuznetsova 1–6, 2–6, but partnered with Vera Dushevina to make the third round of doubles, knocking off fifth seeds Nadia Petrova and Sam Stosur en route. Rodionova then played numerous tournaments in Asia and Arab Emerates highlighted by a quarterfinal showing at Kuala Lumpur, and second round loses at Dubai and Pattaya City. Rodionova lost in qualifying for the Indian Wells Masters but qualified for the main draw of the Miami Masters.

In doubles, she and her sister Arina reached the finals of the Malaysian Open. The Rodionova sisters defeated top seeds Yan Zi and Alisa Kleybanova in straight sets in the second round. However, in the finals, they lost to second seeds Zheng Jie and Chan Yung-jan in a close two-setter and match tie-breaker.

Rodionova's debut for the Australian Fed Cup team was in Kharkov, Ukraine, on 24 April 2010, where she opened the tie with an emphatic win over Alona Bondarenko, coming back from losing the first seven games. This gave Australia a commanding 1–0 lead that set up Sam Stosur for two straight forward wins in her singles matches for a 3–0 defeat of Ukraine, securing Australia's place in World Group I for 2011. Rodionova also partnered with Rennae Stubbs to win the final rubber of doubles after Alicia Molik won her substituted singles match, giving Australia a decisive 5–0 victory in the tie.

In the French Open, Rodionova defeated Ekaterina Makarova in the first round in straight sets. Then caused an upset in the second round by defeating the 22nd seed Vera Zvonareva. However, she lost in the third round against fellow Australian Jarmila Groth, in three sets.

At Wimbledon, Rodionova defeated Anne Keothavong in the first round and then upset the 19th seed Kuznetsova in the second round, before falling to the ninth seed Li Na, 1–6, 3–6.

Rodionova's next tournament was at the Cincinnati Open, where she entered as a qualifier, but lost in the first round to Vera Dushevina. However, in the doubles tournament, she partnered with Cara Black, as the eighth seeds. They won their first-round match against the Spanish pair Nuria Llagostera Vives and Arantxa Parra Santonja. In the second round, Rodionova and Black defeated Meghann Shaughnessy and Elena Vesnina. They were defeated in the quarterfinals by the second seeds Gisela Dulko and Flavia Pennetta. Rodionova reached her career-high singles ranking of world No. 62 on 16 August 2010. Immediately following the Cincinnati Masters, she played at the Connecticut Open, where she entered as a qualifier and defeated Tsvetana Pironkova in the first round, but lost to sixth seed Marion Bartoli in the second. In doubles, she paired with Cara Black, and as the fourth seeds they lost in the first round to Anabel Medina Garrigues and Yan Zi.

At the US Open, Rodionova defeated Bojana Jovanovski in the first round, and fell to fellow Australian Sam Stosur in the second. In doubles, she continued her partnership with Cara Black as ninth seeds. The pair defeated alternative pair Alberta Brianti and Urszula Radwańska in the first round. In the second round, they defeated Alla Kudryavtseva and Darya Kustova. They defeated their German opponents Julia Görges and Anna-Lena Grönefeld to advance to the quarterfinals, where they beat the 14th seeds Elena Vesnina and Vera Zvonareva in three sets. Black and Rodionova were finally defeated by sixth seeds Vania King and Yaroslava Shvedova in the semifinals. Advancing into the semifinals of a Grand Slam tournament for the first time, Rodionova has reached her career-high doubles ranking of world No. 28.

Following her US Open appearance, Rodionova returned home to Melbourne before flying to South Korea to compete in the Hansol Korea Open. She lost to former compatriot and second seed Anastasia Pavlyuchenkova in the first round, before failing to qualify for the Pan Pacific Open.

Rodionova represented Australia at the Commonwealth Games as the top seed in singles, doubles, and mixed doubles (along with compatriots Sally Peers and Paul Hanley, respectively). In singles, she received a bye into the second round, where she crushed Larikah Russell 6–1, 6–3. Rodionova then defeated Heather Watson 6–0, 6–2. She booked a spot into the final defeating her doubles partner Sally Peers. In the final, after a good start, Rodionova came close to defeat with growing Indian support for the home favourite Sania Mirza, but was able to win in three sets. In doubles, Peers and Rodionova won gold, beating compatriots Olivia Rogowska and Jessica Moore in an all-Australian final. In mixed doubles, Rodionova and Hanley encountered a tough first-round match against Indian pair Nirupama Sanjeev and Rohan Bopanna but ended up winning in three sets. They followed up this win by beating Mhairi Brown and Jamie Murray 6–3, 6–4, and following that, defeated Sarah Borwell and Ken Skupski, earning their place in the gold-medal final match but went down to Scot's Colin Fleming and Jocelyn Rae. Rodionova ended the 2010 season with a ranking of No. 64 in the world.

=== 2011 ===
Anastasia made her 2011 debut at the Brisbane International. She drew Bojana Jovanovski in the first round and lost in three sets. She continued her partnerships with Cara Black as they advanced to the semifinals before losing to Alisa Kleybanova and Anastasia Pavlyuchenkova. She was next granted a wildcard to play in the Sydney International where she lost to eighth seed and eventual champion Li Na. At the Australian Open, she played Flavia Pennetta in the first round and lost. Anastasia and Cara beat three doubles teams before losing to Nadia Petrova and Liezel Huber. In mixed doubles, she partnered with Mahesh Bhupathi and won two matches. They were unable to play in the quarterfinals due to an injury Bhupathi sustained in his men's doubles game. Her next tournament is at the Indian Wells Open, where she lost to qualifier and doubles partner Monica Niculescu in the first round. In doubles, Rodionova and Nicelescu lost to 1st seeds Gisela Dulko and Flavia Pennetta in the opener. Anastasia next played at a $100k event in the Bahamas, where she was the seventh seed. She drew Ukrainian qualifier Olga Savchuk in the first round, and ended up prevailing in a tough three-set match. She lost to eventual champion Anastasiya Yakimova in the second round. In doubles, she partnered with her sister Arina, and lost to No. 2 seeds Edina Gallovits-Hall and Monica Niculescu in the first round. Her next tournament was the Sony Ericsson Open. She lost to Johanna Larsson in her first-round match. In doubles, she partnered with Chuang Chia-jung and lost in the first round to wildcards Andrea Petkovic and Ana Ivanovic in three sets.

She began her clay-court season at the Charleston Open where she defeated Zuzana Ondrášková in the first round in three sets. This was Rodionova's first singles win in the 2011 WTA Tour. In doubles, she partnered with Alla Kudryavtseva. They beat wildcards Shelby Rogers and Patty Schnyder in the opener. In the second round, they lost to eventual champions Sania Mirza and Elena Vesnina. Following the Family Circle Cup, Anastasia participated in Fed Cup and lost both singles matches to Lesia Tsurenko and Olga Savchuk. Her and Jarmila Gajdošová also lost their doubles match. Rodionova travelled to Portugal to compete in the Estoril Open. She played Alla Kudryavtseva and lost in three sets. In doubles, she paired with her sister and beat No. 3 seeds, Yan Zi and Zhang Shuai. They were forced to withdraw from their quarterfinal match due to a left adductor injury Anastasia suffered beforehand. She then played at the Madrid Open. As the seventh seed in qualifying, she breezed past compatriot Casey Dellacqua in straight sets. She then lost to Nuria Llagostera Vives in the qualifying competition. In doubles, playing with Nadia Petrova, she beat Vera Dushevina and Tatiana Poutchek in the first round. In round two, they lost to Sania Mirza and Elena Vesnina. Anastasia continued her clay-court season by playing qualifying at the Internazionali d'Italia as the ninth seed. She easily defeated Vania King 6–0, 6–3. In the final round, she faced second seed Zheng Jie and lost the first set; however, she ultimately won 3–6, 6–2, 7–5 in 2 hours and 17 minutes. In the first round of the main draw, Rodionova defeated Yaroslava Shvedova 6–4, 6–4. She was up against world No. 1, Caroline Wozniacki, in the second round. In doubles, Rodionova and Petrova advanced to the quarterfinals before losing. She then lost in the first round of the Brussels Open. At the French Open, she caused a major upset in the first round by defeating doubles partner and 26th seed Nadia Petrova in three sets. She was up against Edina Gallovits-Hall next. In doubles, Rodionova and Petrova seeded ninth played Alberta Brianti and Petra Martić. Competing in mixed doubles with Mark Knowles, they lost to the eventual champions Casey Dellacqua and Scott Lipsky in the first round.

Rodionova lost to Christina McHale in the first round of the Birmingham Classic. At Wimbledon, she lost to Andrea Hlaváčková in the first round. In doubles, she continued her partnership with Petrova and reached the quarterfinals.

Rodionova's first tournament back was the Stanford Classic, where she was defeated by Serena Williams in the first round in under 45 minutes. She partnered with Arina and lost in the quarterfinals in doubles. At the Southern California Open, she defeated Olga Govortsova in a tough three sets. She lost to fourth seed Peng Shuai in the second round.

She then qualified for the Cincinnati Open and had a great win over Polona Hercog with an amazing score 6–0, 6–0 in first round but fell in the second to Sharapova. Then she qualified in New Haven winning three tough matches but had a tough task in the first round and lost to Bartoli.

Rodionova entered the US Open ranked world No. 97, and lost to Alla Kudryavtseva in the first round.

As a result of her not being able to defend her 2010 US Open points, Rodionova fell to No. 125 in the WTA rankings, her lowest ranking since 2009. She then lost in the first round of the Guangzhou International. In doubles, she fell in the quarterfinals. Anastasia showed a great form by qualifying in Tokyo. She lost only three games in total in both matches in qualifying, then she played a good match against Ivanovic but lost in first round. She reached quarterfinal in doubles with Irina Begu by beating polish doubles specialists in first round Jans/Rosolska but lost to second seeded Dulko/Pennetta. Anastasia finished the season with a great run in singles in Linz reaching the quarterfinals and a week after getting into the final of doubles in Kremin Cup in Moscow.

=== 2012 ===
Rodionova began her 2012 season at the Brisbane International, where she fell in the second round of qualifying. She received a wildcard to play in the main draw of the Hobart International. Anastasia defeated Gréta Arn in the first round, but fell to countrywoman Jarmila Gajdošová in three sets in the second.

In the Australian Open, Rodionova lost to then-world No. 1, Caroline Wozniacki, in the first round. At the Pattaya Open, she advanced to the second round where she played fourth seed Maria Kirilenko. Rodionova was two points from winning before Kirilenko fought back for victory in a final-set tiebreak. Rodionova fared even better in doubles, winning the title alongside Sania Mirza. The doubles crown in Pattaya marked Rodionova's fourth WTA doubles title. At the Premier Qatar Open, she did not play singles. Instead, she played in doubles with Nuria Llagostera Vives as the fifth seeds. They lost in the semifinals to Raquel Kops-Jones and Abigail Spears in three sets. She then fell in qualifying of the Dubai Championships, Indian Wells Open, and Miami Open. Rodionova then lost to Alizé Cornet in the second round of an ITF tournament.

Following this, she competed at the Family Circle Cup, a Premier-event on the WTA Tour. As a direct entrant in the main draw, she defeated Melinda Czink in the first round before stunning world No. 27, Anabel Medina Garrigues, in straight sets, in the second round. She was beaten by 2004 champion Venus Williams in the third round. Despite the loss, this was Rodionova's best performance of the year. In the Danish Open, she lost to Kaia Kanepi. She then traveled to Morocco to participate in the WTA's lone African event, the Fes Grand Prix where she suffered another defeat, to Chanelle Scheepers. She then lost in the qualifying rounds in Estoril. She continued her clay-court season, competing at the Madrid Open, where she qualified for the main draw, but lost in the first round to Czech Andrea Hlaváčková. This saw her ranking drop 14 spots to world No. 106. In Rome, she again qualified for the main draw before losing a disappointing match to in-form German Angelique Kerber. Rodionova then lost in the qualifying draw of the Brussels Open and in the first round of the main draw of the French Open.

Rodionova began her grass-court season at the Birmingham Classic. She won her first round match, scoring a patchy 7–6, 1−6, 6–1 win over world No. 466, Abigail Spears. She wouldn't progress much further, losing to Stéphanie Foretz Gacon in straight sets, in the second round. At the Nottingham Open, she lost in the first round of qualifying to former countrywoman Daria Gavrilova, retiring late in the second set due to a neck injury. At Wimbledon, she was drawn against then-world No. 1 Maria Sharapova and lost 2–6, 3–6.

She started her hard court season at the Premier-level Rogers Cup in Montreal, losing in qualifying. Next, she played at New Haven, where she lost in the second round of qualifying to world No. 545, Sachia Vickery, after retiring 3–6 due to illness. Having tumbled down the rankings to No. 163, she entered the qualifying tournament of the US Open for the first time since 2009. She qualified for a place in the main draw by winning matches against Tetiana Luzhanska, Caroline Garcia, and Verónica Cepede Royg. In the first round of the main draw, she drew American wildcard Julia Cohen and defeated her 6–3, 6–0. This was Rodionova's first Grand Slam Main Draw win in 16 months. However, she lost easily to Varvara Lepchenko, 2–6, 2–6. In doubles, she paired with Galina Voskoboeva and lost in the second round of the tournament. In mixed doubles, she played with Jean Julien Rojer, and reached the quarterfinals before losing to eventual champions Ekaterina Makarova and Bruno Soares.

Then ranked world No. 130, Rodionova played World TeamTennis with the Washington Kastles alongside her sister Arina. Rodionova then competed at the Coleman Vision Tennis Championships in Phoenix, Arizona, as the fourth seed in singles. She suffered a disappointing three-set loss to world No. 477, Sachia Vickery, for the second time in the season. She then played at a $50K tournament in Las Vegas. She lost in the semifinals to Lauren Davis, but won the doubles title with her sister. Rodionova then played at the Generali Ladies Linz, losing in the first round of qualifying to Jana Čepelová. Her final tournaments of the year included a first-round loss in Moscow to Alizé Cornet and a quarterfinal appearance at a $75K Challenger in Ismaning. Rodionova ended the year ranked No. 134 in singles and No. 23 in doubles.

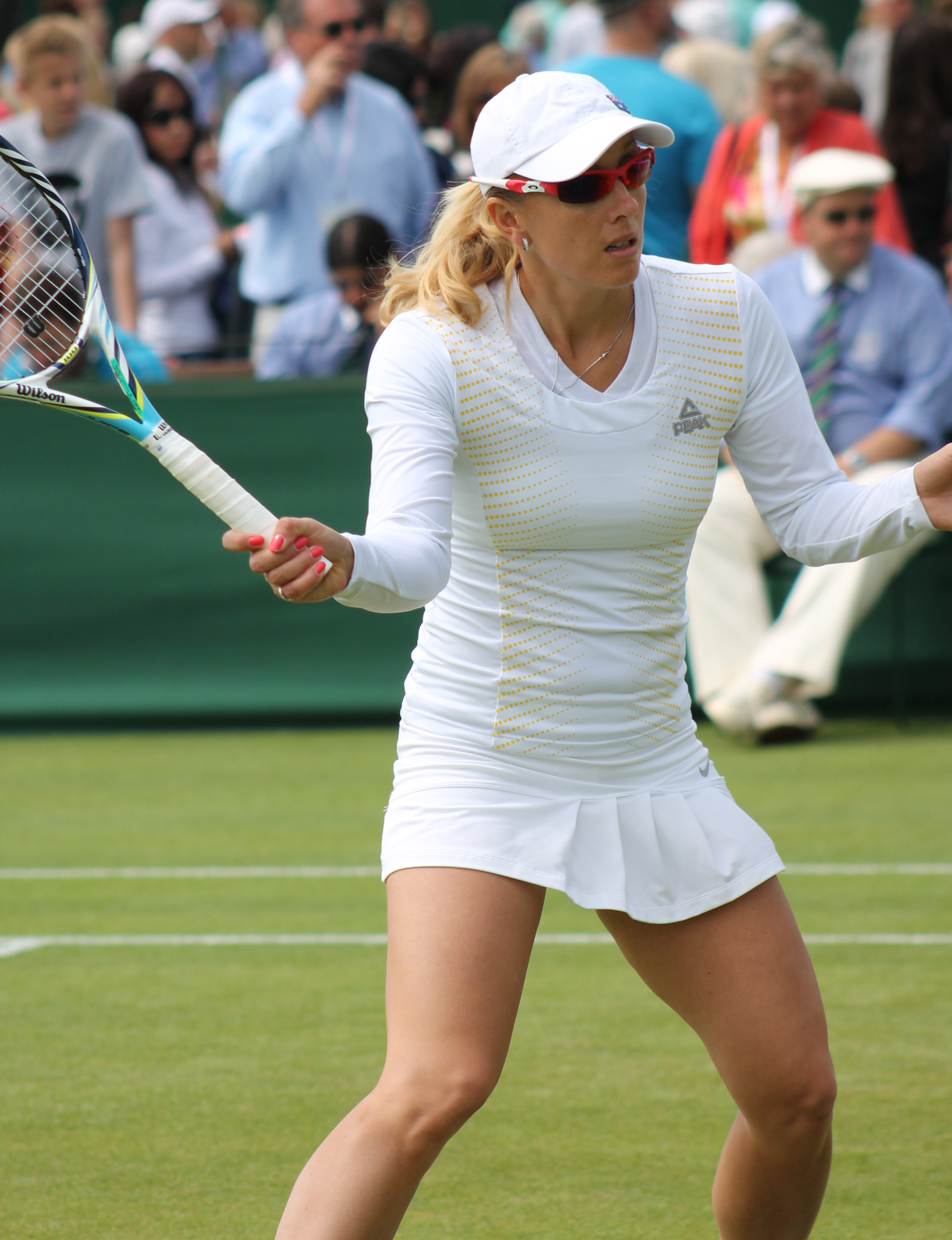
At the 2013 Wimbledon Championships

=== 2013 ===
Rodionova began her 2013 season playing at the Auckland Open where she lost in the second round of qualifying when she was forced to retire against Maryna Zanevska. In the doubles tournament, she partnered with relative-comeback Cara Black and defeated three seeded teams along the way, to win her fifth WTA doubles title. At the Australian Open, Rodionova was the 19th seed in qualifying, losing in the second round of qualifying to Valeria Savinykh in three sets. It was the first time Rodionova failed to appear in the main draw of a Grand Slam since the 2009 Wimbledon Championships. In doubles, her and Cara Black lost in the third round to Nuria Llagostera Vives and Zheng Jie.

Rodionova continued on the WTA Tour, winning her way through qualifying in her next two tournaments in Pattaya City and Doha. In Pattaya City, she won her first round match against Vania King before losing to fourth seed Sorana Cîrstea. In Doha, she defeated Zheng Jie 6–2, 6–3 before losing to fourth seed Agnieszka Radwańska in the second round. Rodionova then fell in the first round of Dubai qualifying to Ekaterina Bychkova.

=== 2014 ===
While in singles she continued playing in the style of the previous season, Rodionova showed progressive results in doubles, when partnering with Alla Kudryavtseva the duo claimed three out of four tournaments. They also reached semifinals of Beijing and Cincinnati, and quarterfinals of Wimbledon, Miami, Doha and Wuhan. That gave the pair a ticket to the WTA Finals in Singapore, where they beat in the quarterfinals fourth-seeded Makarova/Vesnina in three sets before they were defeated by title defenders Hsieh/Peng, 6–1, 6–4.

Her best singles result came at the US Open, where she qualified and defeated Camila Giorgi, before losing a close match to No. 13 seed Sara Errani in round two.

== Grand Slam tournament finals ==
=== Mixed doubles: 1 (runner-up) ===
Result	Year	Championship	Surface	Partner	Opponents	Score
Loss	2003	Wimbledon	Grass	(Israel) Andy Ram	(United States) Martina Navratilova (India) Leander Paes	3–6, 3–6

== WTA Tour finals ==
=== Doubles: 24 (11 titles, 13 runner-ups) ===
Legend
Tier I / Premier M & Premier 5
Tier II / Premier (3–3)
Tier III, IV & V / International (8–10)

Result	No.	Date	Tournament	Surface	Partner	Opponents	Score
Loss	1.	Jul 2001	Sopot Open, Poland	Clay	(Ukraine) Yuliya Beygelzimer	(South Africa) Joannette Kruger (Italy) Francesca Schiavone	4–6, 0–6
Loss	2.	Oct 2005	Tashkent Open, Uzbekistan	Hard	(Russia) Galina Voskoboeva	(Italy) Maria Elena Camerin (France) Émilie Loit	3–6, 0–6
Win	1.	Nov 2005	Tournoi de Québec, Canada	Hard (i)	(Russia) Elena Vesnina	(Latvia) Līga Dekmeijere (United States) Ashley Harkleroad	6–7, 6–4, 6–2
Loss	3.	Feb 2006	Bangalore Open, India	Hard	(Russia) Elena Vesnina	(South Africa) Liezel Huber (India) Sania Mirza	3–6, 3–6
Win	2.	Apr 2007	Estoril Open, Portugal	Clay	(Romania) Andreea Ehritt-Vanc	(Spain) Lourdes Domínguez Lino (Spain) Arantxa Parra Santonja	6–3, 6–2
Loss	4.	May 2007	Rabat Grand Prix, Morocco	Clay	(Romania) Andreea Ehritt-Vanc	(India) Sania Mirza (United States) Vania King	1–6, 2–6
Loss	5.	Oct 2007	Tashkent Open, Uzbekistan	Hard	(Belarus) Tatiana Poutchek	(Belarus) Ekaterina Dzehalevich (Belarus) Anastasia Yakimova	6–2, 4–6, [7–10]
Loss	6.	Feb 2010	Malaysian Open, Malaysia	Hard	(Russia) Arina Rodionova	(China) Zheng Jie (Chinese Taipei) Chan Yung-jan	7–6, 2–6, [7–10]
Loss	7.	May 2010	Internationaux de Strasbourg, France	Clay	(Russia) Alla Kudryavtseva	(United States) Vania King (France) Alizé Cornet	6–3, 4–6, [7–10]
Win	3.	Jun 2010	Rosmalen Open, Netherlands	Grass	(Russia) Alla Kudryavtseva	(United States) Vania King (Kazakhstan) Yaroslava Shvedova	3–6, 6–3, [10–6]
Loss	8.	Oct 2011	Kremlin Cup, Russia	Hard (i)	(Kazakhstan) Galina Voskoboeva	(United States) Vania King (Kazakhstan) Yaroslava Shvedova	6–7^{(3–7)}, 3–6
Win	4.	Feb 2012	Pattaya Open, Thailand	Hard	(India) Sania Mirza	(Chinese Taipei) Chan Yung-jan (Chinese Taipei) Chan Hao-ching	3–6, 6–1, [10–8]
Win	5.	Jan 2013	Auckland Open, New Zealand	Hard	(Zimbabwe) Cara Black	(Germany) Julia Görges (Kazakhstan) Yaroslava Shvedova	2–6, 6–2, [10–5]
Win	6.	Sep 2013	Tournoi de Québec, Canada	Carpet (i)	(Russia) Alla Kudryavtseva	(Czech Republic) Andrea Hlaváčková (Czech Republic) Lucie Hradecká	6–4, 6–3
Loss	9.	Oct 2013	Kremlin Cup, Russia	Hard (i)	(Russia) Alla Kudryavtseva	(Russia) Svetlana Kuznetsova (Australia) Samantha Stosur	1–6, 6–1, [8–10]
Win	7.	Jan 2014	Brisbane International, Australia	Hard	(Russia) Alla Kudryavtseva	(France) Kristina Mladenovic (Kazakhstan) Galina Voskoboeva	6–3, 6–1
Loss	10.	Feb 2014	Pattaya Open, Thailand	Hard	(Russia) Alla Kudryavtseva	(China) Peng Shuai (China) Zhang Shuai	6–3, 6–7^{(5–7)}, [6–10]
Win	8.	Feb 2014	Dubai Championships, UAE	Hard	(Russia) Alla Kudryavtseva	(United States) Raquel Kops-Jones (United States) Abigail Spears	6–2, 5–7, [10–8]
Win	9.	Oct 2014	Tianjin Open, China	Hard	(Russia) Alla Kudryavtseva	(Romania) Sorana Cîrstea (Slovenia) Andreja Klepač	6–7^{(6–8)}, 6–2, [10–8]
Loss	11.	Mar 2015	Monterrey Open, Mexico	Hard	(Australia) Arina Rodionova	(Canada) Gabriela Dabrowski (Poland) Alicja Rosolska	3–6, 6–2, [3–10]
Win	10.	Jun 2016	Eastbourne International, United Kingdom	Grass	(Croatia) Darija Jurak	(Chinese Taipei) Chan Hao-ching (Chinese Taipei) Chan Yung-jan	5–7, 7–6^{(7–4)}, [10–6]
Loss	12.	Jul 2016	Stanford Classic, United States	Hard	(Croatia) Darija Jurak	(United States) Raquel Atawo (United States) Abigail Spears	3–6, 4–6
Win	11.	Mar 2017	Abierto Mexicano, Mexico	Hard	(Croatia) Darija Jurak	(Paraguay) Veronica Cepede Royg (Colombia) Mariana Duque	6–3, 6–2
Loss	13.	May 2018	Internationaux de Strasbourg, France	Clay	(Ukraine) Nadiia Kichenok	(Romania) Mihaela Buzărnescu (Romania) Raluca Olaru	5–7, 5–7

== WTA 125 finals ==
=== Doubles: 1 (runner-up) ===
Result	Date	Tournament	Surface	Partner	Opponents	Score
Loss	Mar 2016	San Antonio Open, United States	Hard	(Poland) Klaudia Jans-Ignacik	(Germany) Anna-Lena Grönefeld (United States) Nicole Melichar	1–6, 3–6

== ITF Circuit finals ==
$100,000 tournaments
$75,000 tournaments
$50,000 tournaments
$25,000 tournaments
$10,000 tournaments

=== Singles (8–2) ===
Result	No.	Date	Tournament	Surface	Opponent	Score
Loss	1.	24 July 2000	ITF Pamplona, Spain	Hard	(Netherlands) Yvette Basting	4–6, 1–6
Win	1.	13 May 2001	ITF Maglie, Italy	Clay	(Croatia) Maja Palaveršić	6–2, 6–4
Win	2.	7 April 2002	ITF Coatzacoalcos, Mexico	Hard	(Czech Republic) Zuzana Hejdová	6–3, 4–6, 6–4
Win	3.	16 May 2004	ITF Stockholm, Sweden	Clay	(Luxembourg) Anne Kremer	7–6, 6–4
Win	4.	13 June 2004	ITF Vaduz, Liechtenstein	Clay	(Austria) Yvonne Meusburger	1–6, 6–3, 7–6
Win	5.	25 September 2005	ITF Albuquerque, United States	Hard	(Canada) Maureen Drake	6–2, 6–3
Win	6.	20 November 2005	ITF Nuriootpa, Australia	Hard	(Germany) Gréta Arn	6–3, 6–1
Loss	2.	27 November 2005	ITF Mount Gambier, Australia	Hard	(Japan) Ryōko Fuda	2–6, 3–6
Win	7.	28 April 2009	ITF Bundaberg, Australia	Clay	(Australia) Olivia Rogowska	7–5, 6–0
Win	8.	5 May 2009	ITF Ipswich, Australia	Clay	(Switzerland) Nicole Riner	6–4, 7–5

=== Doubles (13–7) ===
Result	No.	Date	Tournament	Surface	Partner	Opponents	Score
Win	1.	1 November 1998	ITF Minsk, Belarus	Clay	(Russia) Ekaterina Paniouchkina	(Belarus) Olga Glouschenko (Belarus) Tatiana Poutchek	7–5, 5–7, 6–3
Win	2.	25 March 2001	ITF Cholet, France	Clay (i)	(Ukraine) Yuliya Beygelzimer	(Greece) Eleni Daniilidou (Italy) Germana Di Natale	6–1, 7–6^{(7)}
Win	3.	17 September 2001	ITF Tbilisi, Georgia	Clay	(Austria) Patricia Wartusch	(Argentina) Erica Krauth (Argentina) Vanesa Krauth	6–2, 6–1
Win	4.	3 February 2002	ITF Ortisei, Italy	Carpet (i)	(Ukraine) Yuliya Beygelzimer	(Germany) Angelika Bachmann (Austria) Patricia Wartusch	6–4, 6–2
Loss	5.	24 September 2001	Batumi Ladies Open, Georgia	Carpet (i)	(Belarus) Nadejda Ostrovskaya	(Hungary) Katalin Marosi (Belarus) Tatiana Poutchek	3–6, 6–7^{(3)}
Win	6.	18 March 2002	ITF Juárez, Mexico	Clay	(Russia) Maria Kondratieva	(Czech Republic) Olga Vymetálková (Czech Republic) Magdalena Zděnovcová	6–3, 6–0
Loss	7.	2 April 2002	ITF Coatzacoalcos, Mexico	Hard	(Russia) Ekaterina Kozhokina	(Argentina) Jorgelina Cravero (Mexico) Melissa Torres Sandoval	4–6, 3–6
Loss	8.	2 May 2003	Open Saint-Gaudens, France	Clay	(Belarus) Tatiana Poutchek	(Russia) Evgenia Kulikovskaya (Ukraine) Tatiana Perebiynis	6–7^{(8)}, 3–6
Loss	9.	6 April 2004	ITF Dinan, France	Clay (i)	(Russia) Gulnara Fattakhetdinova	(Croatia) Darija Jurak (Kazakhstan) Galina Voskoboeva	3–6, 2–6
Win	10.	7 June 2004	ITF Vaduz, Liechtenstein	Clay	(Belarus) Tatiana Poutchek	(Sweden) Kira Nagy (Sweden) Maria Wolfbrandt	6–3, 6–4
Win	11.	3 April 2005	ITF Augusta, United States	Hard	(Belarus) Tatiana Poutchek	(Japan) Rika Fujiwara (Japan) Saori Obata	7–6^{(3)}, 6–0
Win	12.	5 April 2005	ITF Tunica Resorts, United States	Clay	(Belarus) Tatiana Poutchek	(Romania) Edina Gallovits (Uzbekistan) Varvara Lepchenko	6–2, 6–4
Win	13.	12 April 2005	ITF Jackson, United States	Clay	(United States) Kristen Schlukebir	(United States) Ahsha Rolle (Venezuela) Milagros Sequera	6–1, 3–6, 6–2
Loss	14.	7 May 2005	ITF Warsaw, Poland	Clay	(Belarus) Tatiana Poutchek	(Poland) Karolina Kosińska (Poland) Alicja Rosolska	6–4, 2–6, 6–7^{(3)}
Win	15.	19 November 2005	ITF Nuriootpa, Australia	Hard	(Hungary) Gréta Arn	(Australia) Casey Dellacqua (Australia) Trudi Musgrave	6–4, 1–6, 7–5
Loss	16.	27 November 2005	ITF Mount Gambier, Australia	Hard	(Hungary) Gréta Arn	(Japan) Ryoko Fuda (United States) Sunitha Rao	1–6, ret.
Win	17.	9 April 2006	ITF Putignano, Italy	Hard	(Australia) Arina Rodionova	(Croatia) Ivana Abramović (Croatia) Maria Abramović	1–6, 6–1, 7–5
Loss	18.	28 October 2007	Empire Slovak Open, Slovakia	Hard	(Ukraine) Olga Savchuk	(Czech Republic) Renata Voráčová (Czech Republic) Barbora Strýcová	4–6, 4–6
Win	19.	12 July 2009	Open de Biarritz, France	Clay	(Chinese Taipei) Chan Yung-jan	(Uzbekistan) Akgul Amanmuradova (Belarus) Darya Kustova	3–6, 6–4, [10–7]
Win	20.	30 September 2012	Las Vegas Open, United States	Hard	(Australia) Arina Rodionova	(Russia) Elena Bovina (Romania) Edina Gallovits-Hall	6–2, 2–6, [10–6]

== Performance timelines ==
Key
W	F	SF	QF	#R	RR	Q#	DNQ	A	NH

(W) winner; (F) finalist; (SF) semifinalist; (QF) quarterfinalist; (#R) rounds 4, 3, 2, 1; (RR) round-robin stage; (Q#) qualification round; (DNQ) did not qualify; (A) absent; (NH) not held; (SR) strike rate (events won / competed); (W–L) win–loss record.

=== Singles ===
	Russia								Australia													
Tournament	2001	2002	2003	2004	2005	2006	2007	2008	2009	2010	2011	2012	2013	2014	2015	2016	2017	2018	2019	2020	2021	2022
Grand Slam tournaments
Australian Open	A	Q1	Q1	Q2	Q1	Q3	2R	2R	1R	1R	1R	1R	Q2	Q2	Q2	A	A	A	A	A	A	A
French Open	A	Q1	Q1	A	Q1	1R	1R	1R	A	3R	3R	1R	Q3	A	Q3	A	A	A	A	A	A	A
Wimbledon	Q1	Q2	1R	Q1	Q1	2R	1R	1R	Q2	3R	1R	1R	Q1	Q1	Q1	A	A	A	A	A	A	A
US Open	Q2	Q3	Q1	Q2	A	3R	2R	1R	3R	2R	1R	2R	Q3	2R	Q1	A	A	A	A	A	A	A
Win–loss	0–0	0–0	0–1	0–0	0–0	4–3	2–4	1–4	2–2	5–4	2–4	1–4	0–0	1–1	0–0	0–0	0–0	0–0	0–0	0–0	0–0	0–0
Premier Mandatory tournaments
Indian Wells	A	A	Q1	A	A	1R	2R	1R	Q1	Q1	1R	Q2	Q2	Q1	Q2	A	A	A	A	A	A	A
Miami	A	A	2R	A	A	Q2	2R	2R	Q2	1R	1R	Q2	Q1	A	A	A	A	A	A	A	A	A
Madrid	Not Held								A	Q2	Q2	1R	A	A	Q1	A	A	A	A	A	A	A
Beijing	Not Tier I									Q1	A	Q1	A	A	A	A	A	A	A	NH		
Premier 5 tournaments
Rome	A	A	A	A	A	A	A	1R	A	A	2R	1R	Q1	A	A	A	A	A	A	A	A	A
Montréal / Toronto	A	A	A	A	A	Q2	1R	2R	Q2	A	Q1	Q2	1R	A	A	A	A	Q1	A	A	A	A
Cincinnati	Not Held			Not Tier I					Q1	1R	2R	A	A	A	A	A	A	A	A	A	A	A
Tokyo / Wuhan	A	A	A	Q1	A	Q2	Q1	A	Q2	Q2	1R	A	1R	Q1	A	Q1	Q1	A	A	NH		

=== Doubles ===
	Russia								Australia												
Tournament	2002	2003	2004	2005	2006	2007	2008	2009	2010	2011	2012	2013	2014	2015	2016	2017	2018	2019	2020	2021	2022
Grand Slam tournaments
Australian Open	1R	1R	1R	1R	2R	1R	2R	2R	3R	QF	2R	3R	1R	2R	QF	1R	3R	1R	A	A	A
French Open	1R	1R	A	A	2R	2R	2R	3R	1R	QF	QF	3R	1R	3R	1R	2R	2R	A	A	A	A
Wimbledon	QF	1R	2R	1R	2R	1R	1R	2R	1R	QF	2R	1R	QF	2R	2R	1R	2R	A	NH	A	A
US Open	1R	A	1R	A	2R	1R	3R	2R	SF	1R	2R	2R	3R	2R	2R	2R	1R	A	A	3R	A
Win–loss	3–4	0–3	1–3	0–2	4–4	1–4	4–4	5–4	6–4	9–4	6–4	5–4	5–4	5–4	5–4	2–4	4–4	0–1	0–0	2–1	0–0
Year-end championships
Tour Championships	A	A	A	A	A	A	A	A	A	A	A	A	SF	A	A	A	A	A	A	A	A
WTA 1000
Dubai / Doha	Not Tier I						1R	2R	2R	1R	SF	2R	QF	QF	A	2R	1R	A	NH	A	A
Indian Wells	A	A	A	A	1R	1R	2R	QF	2R	1R	1R	2R	1R	1R	1R	1R	1R	A	NH	1R	A
Miami	A	A	A	A	1R	1R	1R	1R	1R	1R	1R	1R	QF	QF	2R	2R	QF	A	NH	A	1R
Madrid	Not Held							A	QF	2R	1R	2R	1R	1R	1R	2R	2R	A	NH	A	A
Rome	A	A	A	A	A	A	1R	A	A	QF	A	SF	1R	1R	1R	2R	2R	A	A	A	A
Montréal / Toronto	A	A	A	A	2R	2R	QF	QF	2R	1R	SF	2R	1R	1R	2R	SF	1R	A	NH	A	A
Cincinnati	Not Held		Not Tier I					QF	QF	1R	2R	2R	SF	2R	1R	1R	2R	A	A	A	A
Tokyo / Wuhan	A	A	A	A	1R	1R	A	A	1R	QF	A	SF	QF	2R	1R	2R	1R	A	NH		
Beijing	Not Tier I								A	1R	A	1R	SF	2R	1R	1R	2R	A	NH		

=== Mixed doubles ===
	Russia								Australia								
Tournament	2002	2003	2004	2005	2006	2007	2008	2009	2010	2011	2012	2013	2014	2015	2016	2017	2018
Australian Open	A	A	A	A	A	A	A	2R	1R	QF	1R	1R	2R	1R	1R	A	A
French Open	A	A	A	A	A	1R	A	2R	A	1R	1R	2R	1R	QF	A	1R	A
Wimbledon	1R	F	3R	A	1R	A	1R	2R	1R	2R	1R	1R	QF	3R	3R	2R	2R
US Open	A	A	A	A	2R	A	1R	A	A	1R	QF	1R	2R	QF	1R	SF	A
