= Elena Vesnina career statistics =

Career finals
Discipline	Type	Won	Lost	Total	WR (Note: Winning rate)
Singles	Grand Slam	–	–	–	–
Singles	Summer Olympics	–	–	–	–
Singles	WTA Finals (Note: Formerly known as: Virginia Slims Championships (until 1995); WTA Tour Championships (until 2014))	–	–	–	–
Singles	WTA Elite (Note: Elite tier: WTA Tournament of Champions (2009–14); WTA Elite Trophy (2015–present))	–	–	–	–
Singles	WTA 1000 (Note: Formerly known as: Category 4 & 5 & 6 (until 1990); Tier I (until 2009); WTA Premier Mandatory and 5 (until 2021))	1	0	1	1.00
Singles	WTA 500 (Note: Formerly known as: Category 3 (until 1990); Tier II (until 2009); WTA Premier (until 2021))	1	3	4	0.25
Singles	WTA 250 (Note: Formerly known as: Category 1 & 2 (until 1990); Tier III & IV & V (until 2009); WTA International (until 2021))	1	4	5	0.20
Singles	Total	3	7	10	0.30
Doubles	Grand Slam	3	8	11	0.27
Doubles	Summer Olympics	1	0	1	1.00
Doubles	WTA Finals	1	1	2	0.50
Doubles	WTA Elite	–	–	–	–
Doubles	WTA 1000	8	9	17	0.47
Doubles	WTA 500	3	7	10	0.30
Doubles	WTA 250	3	1	4	0.75
Doubles	Total	19	26	45	0.42
Mixed doubles	Grand Slam	1	4	5	0.20
Mixed doubles	Summer Olympics	0	1	1	0.00
Mixed doubles	Total	1	5	6	0.17
Total		23	38	61	0.38

This is a list of the main career statistics of Russian former professional tennis player Elena Vesnina.

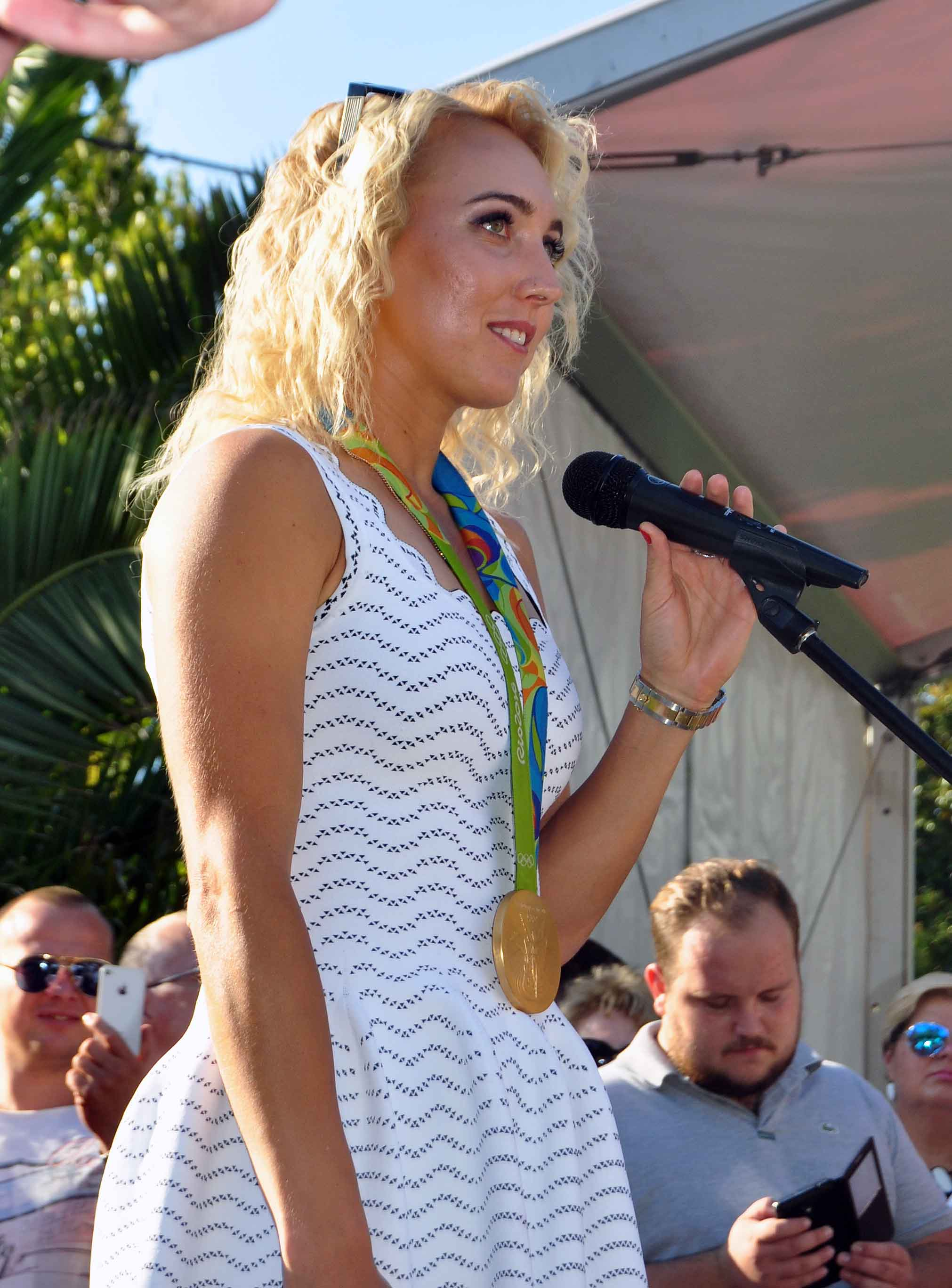
Vesnina in 2018

== Performance timelines ==
Key
W	F	SF	QF	#R	RR	Q#	P#	DNQ	A	Z#	PO	G	S	B	NMS	NTI	P	NH

(W) winner; (F) finalist; (SF) semifinalist; (QF) quarterfinalist; (#R) rounds 4, 3, 2, 1; (RR) round-robin stage; (Q#) qualification round; (P#) preliminary round; (DNQ) did not qualify; (A) absent; (Z#) Davis/Fed Cup Zonal Group (with number indication) or (PO) play-off; (G) gold, (S) silver or (B) bronze Olympic/Paralympic medal; (NMS) not a Masters tournament; (NTI) not a Tier I tournament; (P) postponed; (NH) not held; (SR) strike rate (events won / competed); (W–L) win–loss record.
To avoid confusion and double counting, these charts are updated at the conclusion of a tournament or when the player's participation has ended.

Only main-draw results in WTA Tour, Grand Slam tournaments, Billie Jean King Cup (Fed Cup), Hopman Cup and Olympic Games are included in win–loss records.

=== Singles ===
Tournament	2003	2004	2005	2006	2007	2008	2009	2010	2011	2012	2013	2014	2015	2016	2017	2018	...	2021	SR	W–L	Win %
Grand Slam tournaments
Australian Open	A	A	A	4R	2R	3R	1R	1R	1R	1R	4R	1R	1R	Q1	3R	2R		A	0 / 12	12–12	50%
French Open	A	A	A	1R	1R	1R	2R	1R	1R	1R	1R	2R	3R	2R	3R	1R		3R	0 / 14	8–14	35%
Wimbledon	A	A	A	2R	3R	2R	4R	1R	2R	2R	2R	2R	1R	SF	2R	A		2R	0 / 13	18–13	58%
US Open	A	A	Q2	1R	1R	2R	3R	1R	1R	2R	2R	3R	2R	3R	3R	A		A	0 / 12	12–12	50%
Win–loss	0–0	0–0	0–0	4–4	3–4	4–4	6–4	0–4	1–4	2–4	5–4	4–4	3–4	8–3	7–4	1–2		2–2	0 / 51	50–51	50%
Year-end championship
WTA Elite Trophy	not held						did not qualify				RR	DNQ		RR	RR	DNQ		DNQ	0 / 3	3–4	43%
National representation
Billie Jean King Cup	absent			PO	W	W	absent		F	SF	SF	PO	F	PO	PO	PO		A	2 / 6	3–3	50%
WTA 1000 + former^{†} tournaments
Dubai / Qatar Open (Note: The first Premier 5 event of the year has switched back and forth between the Dubai Tennis Championships and the Qatar Total Open since 2009. Dubai was classified as a Premier 5 event from 2009 to 2011 before being succeeded by Doha for the 2012–2014 period. In 2015, Dubai regained its Premier 5 status while Doha was demoted to Premier status. The Premier 5 tournaments were reclassified as WTA 1000 tournaments in 2021.)	NMS					1R	QF	1R	1R	1R	A	A	1R	QF	3R	1R		A	0 / 9	7–9	44%
Indian Wells Open	A	A	A	1R	A	2R	3R	A	1R	2R	3R	2R	2R	Q1	W	3R		A	1 / 10	13–9	59%
Miami Open	A	A	A	3R	1R	4R	Q1	3R	3R	1R	3R	3R	2R	3R	2R	2R		A	0 / 12	13–12	52%
Berlin / Madrid Open (Note: In 2009, the Berlin Open was replaced by the Madrid Open. The Premier Mandatory tournaments were reclassified as WTA 1000 tournaments in 2021.)	A	A	A	1R	1R	1R	3R	1R	2R	1R	1R	1R	Q1	2R	1R	1R		1R	0 / 13	4–13	24%
Italian Open	A	A	A	A	Q1	1R	2R	1R	3R	A	1R	2R	1R	Q2	1R	2R		Q1	0 / 9	5–9	36%
Canadian Open	A	A	Q2	Q1	A	1R	1R	A	1R	A	1R	2R	Q1	1R	2R	A		A	0 / 7	2–7	22%
Cincinnati Open	NMS						1R	3R	1R	A	3R	Q2	Q1	A	2R	A		A	0 / 5	5–5	50%
Pan Pacific / Wuhan Open (Note: In 2014, the Toray Pan Pacific Open was downgraded to a Premier event and replaced by the Wuhan Open. The Premier 5 tournaments were reclassified as WTA 1000 tournaments in 2021.)	A	A	A	A	1R	A	3R	A	A	A	1R	A	A	A	3R	A		NH	0 / 4	4–4	50%
China Open	NMS						1R	3R	A	3R	1R	A	Q1	1R	3R	A		NH	0 / 6	6–6	50%
Charleston Open†	A	A	A	1R	1R	1R	NMS											A	0 / 3	0–3	0%
Southern California Open†	NMS	A	A	2R	A	A	NMS											A	0 / 1	1–1	50%
Kremlin Cup†	Q1	Q2	Q1	2R	2R	1R	NMS											A	0 / 3	2–3	40%
Zurich Open†	A	A	A	A	Q1	NH/NMS												NH	0 / 0	0–0	–
Win–loss	0–0	0–0	0–0	4–6	1–5	4–8	10–8	5–6	5–7	3–5	4–8	3–5	2–4	6–5	13–8	2–5		0–1	1 / 82	62–81	50%
Career statistics
	2003	2004	2005	2006	2007	2008	2009	2010	2011	2012	2013	2014	2015	2016	2017	2018	...	2021	SR	W–L	Win%
Tournaments		1	6	24	22	19	20	22	21	17	21	17	17	17	25	11		4	Career total: 264		
Titles		0	0	0	0	0	0	0	0	0	2	0	0	0	1	0		0	Career total: 3		
Finals		0	0	0	0	0	2	2	1	1	2	0	0	1	1	0		0	Career total: 10		
Overall win–loss		0–1	6–6	20–24	20–22	12–20	31–20	22–22	18–21	14–17	30–20	17–17	11–17	28–17	26–26	8–11		3–4	3 / 264	266–265	50%
Year-end ranking		286	111	44	55	78	23	52	57	69	25	65	111	16	18	137			$12,527,014		

=== Doubles ===
Tournament	2004	2005	2006	2007	2008	2009	2010	2011	2012	2013	2014	2015	2016	2017	2018	...	2021	SR	W–L	Win%
Grand Slam tournaments
Australian Open	A	A	1R	1R	2R	3R	3R	2R	SF	SF	F	QF	3R	QF	F		A	0 / 13	31–13	70%
French Open	A	A	QF	1R	2R	F	3R	F	QF	W	2R	SF	F	QF	1R		1R	1 / 14	38–13	75%
Wimbledon	A	A	1R	3R	2R	3R	F	SF	QF	3R	3R	F	QF	W	A		F	1 / 13	38–11	78%
US Open	A	A	3R	1R	2R	QF	QF	3R	3R	QF	W	2R	SF	3R	A		A	1 / 12	29–10	74%
Win–loss	0–0	0–0	5–4	2–4	4–4	11–3	11–4	12–4	12–4	15–3	13–3	13–3	14–4	14–3	5–2		5–2	3 / 52	136–47	74%
Year-end championship
WTA Finals	did not qualify									F	QF	A	W	SF	A		DNQ	1 / 4	5–3	63%
National representation
Summer Olympics	A	not held			QF	not held			QF	not held			G	not held			4th	1 / 4	11–4	73%
WTA 1000
Dubai / Qatar Open	Tier II				1R	QF	1R	QF	1R	A	A	QF	SF	W	QF		A	1 / 8	13–8	62%
Indian Wells Open	A	A	1R	A	W	1R	A	W	F	W	3R	F	2R	SF	F		A	3 / 11	33–8	80%
Miami Open	A	A	A	2R	A	2R	2R	2R	1R	QF	F	F	2R	QF	SF		A	0 / 11	20–11	65%
Madrid Open	not held					QF	1R	QF	F	QF	2R	QF	SF	2R	W		QF	1 / 11	20–10	67%
Italian Open	A	A	A	A	1R	2R	2R	1R	F	A	QF	1R	F	F	A		QF	0 / 10	16–10	62%
Canadian Open	A	1R	2R	A	SF	2R	QF	1R	A	SF	QF	2R	W	W	A		A	2 / 11	19–9	68%
Cincinnati Open	Tier III					2R	2R	A	A	SF	2R	QF	A	A	A		A	0 / 5	7–5	58%
Pan Pacific / Wuhan Open	A	A	A	QF	A	QF	A	A	A	1R	A	A	A	QF	A		NH	0 / 4	3–3	50%
China Open	Tier II					A	A	A	W	A	A	QF	2R	SF	A		NH	1 / 4	7–3	70%
Career statistics
	2004	2005	2006	2007	2008	2009	2010	2011	2012	2013	2014	2015	2016	2017	2018	...	2021			
Tournaments	1	10	20	18	18	16	16	17	18	16	15	16	16	16	7		9	Career total: 229		
Titles	0	1	0	1	1	0	0	3	2	2	1	1	3	3	1		0	Career total: 19		
Finals	0	1	2	3	3	1	1	4	6	3	3	4	5	5	3		1	Career total: 44		
Overall win–loss	0–1	5–9	14–19	19–16	29–16	23–13	18–15	32–14	40–16	33–12	24–14	31–13	41–13	38–13	19–6		15–10	19 / 229	422–235	64%
Year-end ranking	201	126	46	45	18	22	23	10	9	5	7	8	6	3	16		45			

=== Mixed doubles ===
Tournament	2007	2008	2009	2010	2011	2012	2013	2014	2015	2016	2017	...	2021	W–L
Australian Open	A	A	1R	QF	1R	F	2R	2R	A	W	A		A	13–6
French Open	1R	1R	2R	2R	2R	SF	1R	A	1R	QF	A		F	11–10
Wimbledon	2R	1R	3R	2R	F	F	A	A	QF	2R	SF		A	14–8
US Open	A	2R	A	2R	SF	QF	A	A	A	A	A		A	7–3
Win–loss	0–2	1–3	2–3	4–4	8–3	13–4	1–2	1–1	2–2	7–1	3–1		3–1	45–27

== Significant finals ==
=== Doubles: 11 (3 titles, 8 runner-ups) ===
Result	Year	Championship	Surface	Partner	Opponents	Score
Loss	2009	French Open	Clay	(Belarus) Victoria Azarenka	(Spain) Anabel Medina Garrigues (Spain) Virginia Ruano Pascual	1–6, 1–6
Loss	2010	Wimbledon	Grass	(Russia) Vera Zvonareva	(United States) Vania King (Kazakhstan) Yaroslava Shvedova	6–7^{(6–8)}, 2–6
Loss	2011	French Open	Clay	(India) Sania Mirza	(Czech Republic) Andrea Hlaváčková (Czech Republic) Lucie Hradecká	4–6, 3–6
Win	2013	French Open	Clay	(Russia) Ekaterina Makarova	(Italy) Sara Errani (Italy) Roberta Vinci	7–5, 6–2
Loss	2014	Australian Open	Hard	(Russia) Ekaterina Makarova	(Italy) Sara Errani (Italy) Roberta Vinci	4–6, 6–3, 5–7
Win	2014	US Open	Hard	(Russia) Ekaterina Makarova	(Switzerland) Martina Hingis (Italy) Flavia Pennetta	2–6, 6–3, 6–2
Loss	2015	Wimbledon	Grass	(Russia) Ekaterina Makarova	(Switzerland) Martina Hingis (India) Sania Mirza	7–5, 6–7^{(4–7)}, 5–7
Loss	2016	French Open	Clay	(Russia) Ekaterina Makarova	(France) Caroline Garcia (France) Kristina Mladenovic	3–6, 6–2, 4–6
Win	2017	Wimbledon	Grass	(Russia) Ekaterina Makarova	(Chinese Taipei) Chan Hao-ching (Romania) Monica Niculescu	6–0, 6–0
Loss	2018	Australian Open	Hard	(Russia) Ekaterina Makarova	(Hungary) Tímea Babos (France) Kristina Mladenovic	4–6, 3–6
Loss	2021	Wimbledon	Grass	(Russia) Veronika Kudermetova	(Chinese Taipei) Hsieh Su-wei (Belgium) Elise Mertens	6–3, 5–7, 7–9

=== Mixed doubles: 5 (1 title, 4 runner-ups) ===
Result	Year	Championship	Surface	Partner	Opponents	Score
Loss	2011	Wimbledon	Grass	(India) Mahesh Bhupathi	(Austria) Jürgen Melzer (Czech Republic) Iveta Benešová	3–6, 2–6
Loss	2012	Australian Open	Hard	(India) Leander Paes	(Romania) Horia Tecău (United States) Bethanie Mattek-Sands	3–6, 7–5, [3–10]
Loss	2012	Wimbledon	Grass	(India) Leander Paes	(United States) Mike Bryan (United States) Lisa Raymond	3–6, 7–5, 4–6
Win	2016	Australian Open	Hard	(Brazil) Bruno Soares	(United States) CoCo Vandeweghe (Romania) Horia Tecău	6–4, 4–6, [10–5]
Loss	2021	French Open	Clay	(Russia) Aslan Karatsev	(United States) Desirae Krawczyk (United Kingdom) Joe Salisbury	6–2, 4–6, [5–10]

=== Olympics ===
==== Doubles: 2 (1 gold medal) ====
Result	Year	Tournament	Surface	Partner	Opponents	Score
Gold	2016	Rio Olympics	Hard	(Russia) Ekaterina Makarova	(Switzerland) Timea Bacsinszky (Switzerland) Martina Hingis	6–4, 6–4
4th place	2020	Tokyo Olympics	Hard	(Russia) Veronika Kudermetova	(Brazil) Laura Pigossi (Brazil) Luisa Stefani	6–4, 4–6, [9–11]

==== Mixed doubles: 1 (silver medal) ====
Result	Year	Tournament	Surface	Partner	Opponents	Score
Silver	2020	Tokyo Olympics	Hard	(Russia) Aslan Karatsev	(Russia) Anastasia Pavlyuchenkova (Russia) Andrey Rublev	3–6, 7–6^{(7–5)}, [11–13]

=== WTA Finals ===
==== Doubles: 2 (1 title, 1 runner–up) ====
Result	Year	Championship	Surface	Partner	Opponents	Score
Loss	2013	WTA Championships, Istanbul	Hard (i)	(Russia) Ekaterina Makarova	(Chinese Taipei) Hsieh Su-wei (China) Peng Shuai	4–6, 5–7
Win	2016	WTA Finals, Singapore	Hard (i)	(Russia) Ekaterina Makarova	(United States) Bethanie Mattek-Sands (Czech Republic) Lucie Šafářová	7–6^{(7–5)}, 6–3

=== WTA 1000 ===
==== Singles: 1 (title) ====
Result	Year	Tournament	Surface	Opponent	Score
Win	2017	Indian Wells Open	Hard	(Russia) Svetlana Kuznetsova	6–7^{(6–8)}, 7–5, 6–4

==== Doubles: 17 (8 titles, 9 runner-ups) ====
Result	Year	Tournament	Surface	Partner	Opponents	Score
Win	2008	Indian Wells Open	Hard	(Russia) Dinara Safina	(China) Yan Zi; (China) Zheng Jie	6–1, 1–6, [10–8]
Win	2011	Indian Wells Open (2)	Hard	(India) Sania Mirza	(United States) Bethanie Mattek-Sands; (United States) Meghann Shaughnessy	6–0, 7–5
Loss	2012	Indian Wells Open	Hard	(India) Sania Mirza	(United States) Liezel Huber; (United States) Lisa Raymond	2–6, 3–6
Loss	2012	Madrid Open	Clay	(Russia) Ekaterina Makarova	(Italy) Sara Errani; (Italy) Roberta Vinci	1–6, 6–3, [4–10]
Loss	2012	Italian Open	Clay	(Russia) Ekaterina Makarova	(Italy) Sara Errani (Italy) Roberta Vinci	2–6, 5–7
Win	2012	China Open	Hard	(Russia) Ekaterina Makarova	(Spain) Nuria Llagostera Vives (India) Sania Mirza	7–5, 7–5
Win	2013	Indian Wells Open (3)	Hard	(Russia) Ekaterina Makarova	(Russia) Nadia Petrova; (Slovenia) Katarina Srebotnik	6–0, 5–7, [10–6]
Loss	2014	Miami Open	Hard	(Russia) Ekaterina Makarova	(Switzerland) Martina Hingis; (Germany) Sabine Lisicki	6–4, 4–6, [5–10]
Loss	2015	Indian Wells Open (2)	Hard	(Russia) Ekaterina Makarova	(Switzerland) Martina Hingis (India) Sania Mirza	3–6, 4–6
Loss	2015	Miami Open (2)	Hard	(Russia) Ekaterina Makarova	(Switzerland) Martina Hingis (India) Sania Mirza	5–7, 1–6
Loss	2016	Italian Open (2)	Clay	(Russia) Ekaterina Makarova	(Switzerland) Martina Hingis (India) Sania Mirza	1–6, 7–6^{(7–5)}, [3–10]
Win	2016	Canadian Open	Hard	(Russia) Ekaterina Makarova	(Romania) Simona Halep; (Romania) Monica Niculescu	6–3, 7–6^{(7–5)}
Win	2017	Dubai Championships	Hard	(Russia) Ekaterina Makarova	(Czech Republic) Andrea Hlaváčková (China) Peng Shuai	6–2, 4–6, [10–7]
Loss	2017	Italian Open (3)	Clay	(Russia) Ekaterina Makarova	(Chinese Taipei) Chan Yung-jan (Switzerland) Martina Hingis	5–7, 6–7^{(4–7)}
Win	2017	Canadian Open	Hard	(Russia) Ekaterina Makarova	(Germany) Anna-Lena Grönefeld; (Czech Republic) Květa Peschke	6–0, 6–4
Loss	2018	Indian Wells Open (3)	Hard	(Russia) Ekaterina Makarova	(Chinese Taipei) Hsieh Su-wei; (Czech Republic) Barbora Strýcová	4–6, 4–6
Win	2018	Madrid Open	Clay	(Russia) Ekaterina Makarova	(Hungary) Tímea Babos; (France) Kristina Mladenovic	2–6, 6–4, [10–8]

== WTA Tour finals ==
=== Singles: 10 (3 titles, 7 runner-ups) ===
Legend WTA 1000 (Premier M) (1–0) WTA 500 (Premier) (1–3) WTA 250 (International) (1–4)	Finals by surface Hard (2–4) Grass (1–0) Clay (0–3)

Result	W–L	Date	Tournament	Tier	Surface	Opponent	Score
Loss	0–1	Jan 2009	Auckland Open, New Zealand	International	Hard	(Russia) Elena Dementieva	4–6, 1–6
Loss	0–2	Aug 2009	Connecticut Open, U.S.	Premier	Hard	(Denmark) Caroline Wozniacki	2–6, 4–6
Loss	0–3	Jul 2010	İstanbul Cup, Turkey	International	Hard	(Russia) Anastasia Pavlyuchenkova	7–5, 5–7, 4–6
Loss	0–4	Sep 2010	Tashkent Open, Uzbekistan	International	Hard	(Russia) Alla Kudryavtseva	4–6, 4–6
Loss	0–5	Apr 2011	Charleston Open, U.S.	Premier	Clay (green)	(Denmark) Caroline Wozniacki	2–6, 3–6
Loss	0–6	May 2012	Hungarian Open, Hungary	International	Clay	(Italy) Sara Errani	5–7, 4–6
Win	1–6	Jan 2013	Hobart International, Australia	International	Hard	(Germany) Mona Barthel	6–3, 6–4
Win	2–6	Jun 2013	Eastbourne International, UK	Premier	Grass	(United States) Jamie Hampton	6–2, 6–1
Loss	2–7	Apr 2016	Charleston Open, U.S.	Premier	Clay (green)	(United States) Sloane Stephens	6–7^{(4–7)}, 2–6
Win	3–7	Mar 2017	Indian Wells Open, U.S.	Premier M	Hard	(Russia) Svetlana Kuznetsova	6–7^{(6–8)}, 7–5, 6–4

=== Doubles: 45 (19 titles, 26 runner-ups) ===
Legend Grand Slam tournaments (3–8) Summer Olympics (1–0) Finals (1–1) WTA 1000 (Tier I / Premier 5 / Premier M) (8–9) WTA 500 (Tier II / Premier) (3–7) WTA 250 (Tier III / Tier IV / International) (3–1)	Finals by surface Hard (15–13) Grass (1–3) Clay (3–9) Carpet (0–1)

Result	W–L	Date	Tournament	Tier	Surface	Partner	Opponents	Score
Win	1–0	Nov 2005	Tournoi de Québec, Canada	Tier III	Hard (i)	(Russia) Anastasia Rodionova	(Latvia) Līga Dekmeijere (United States) Ashley Harkleroad	6–7^{(4–7)}, 6–4, 6–2
Loss	1–1	Feb 2006	Bangalore Open, India	Tier III	Hard	(Russia) Anastasia Rodionova	(India) Sania Mirza (South Africa) Liezel Huber	3–6, 3–6
Loss	1–2	Sep 2006	China Open, China	Tier II	Hard	(Russia) Anna Chakvetadze	(Spain) Virginia Ruano Pascual (Argentina) Paola Suárez	2–6, 4–6
Win	2–2	Jan 2007	Hobart International, Australia	Tier IV	Hard	(Russia) Elena Likhovtseva	(Spain) Anabel Medina Garrigues (Spain) Virginia Ruano Pascual	2–6, 6–1, 6–2
Loss	2–3	Feb 2007	Diamond Games, Belgium	Tier II	Carpet (i)	(Russia) Elena Likhovtseva	(Zimbabwe) Cara Black (United States) Liezel Huber	5–7, 6–4, 1–6
Loss	2–4	May 2007	Warsaw Open, Poland	Tier II	Clay	(Russia) Elena Likhovtseva	(Russia) Vera Dushevina (Ukraine) Tatiana Perebiynis	5–7, 6–3, [2–10]
Win	3–4	Mar 2008	Indian Wells Open, U.S.	Tier I	Hard	(Russia) Dinara Safina	(China) Yan Zi (China) Zheng Jie	6–1, 1–6, [10–8]
Loss	3–5	Apr 2008	Amelia Island Championships, U.S.	Tier II	Clay	(Belarus) Victoria Azarenka	(United States) Bethanie Mattek (Czech Republic) Vladimíra Uhlířová	3–6, 1–6
Loss	3–6	Jul 2008	Bank of the West Classic, U.S.	Tier II	Hard	(Russia) Vera Zvonareva	(Zimbabwe) Cara Black (United States) Liezel Huber	4–6, 3–6
Loss	3–7	May 2009	French Open, France	Grand Slam	Clay	(Belarus) Victoria Azarenka	(Spain) Anabel Medina Garrigues (Spain) Virginia Ruano Pascual	1–6, 1–6
Loss	3–8	Jul 2010	Wimbledon, UK	Grand Slam	Grass	(Russia) Vera Zvonareva	(United States) Vania King (Kazakhstan) Yaroslava Shvedova	6–7^{(6–8)}, 2–6
Win	4–8	Mar 2011	Indian Wells Open, U.S. (2)	Premier M	Hard	(India) Sania Mirza	(United States) Bethanie Mattek-Sands (United States) Meghann Shaughnessy	6–0, 7–5
Win	5–8	Apr 2011	Charleston Open, U.S.	Premier	Clay	(India) Sania Mirza	(United States) Bethanie Mattek-Sands (United States) Meghann Shaughnessy	6–4, 6–4
Loss	5–9	Jun 2011	French Open, France	Grand Slam	Clay	(India) Sania Mirza	(Czech Republic) Andrea Hlaváčková (Czech Republic) Lucie Hradecká	3–6, 4–6
Win	6–9	Oct 2011	Linz Open, Austria	International	Hard (i)	(New Zealand) Marina Erakovic	(Germany) Julia Görges (Germany) Anna-Lena Grönefeld	7–5, 6–1
Loss	6–10	Feb 2012	Dubai Championships, UAE	Premier	Hard	(India) Sania Mirza	(United States) Liezel Huber (United States) Lisa Raymond	2–6, 1–6
Loss	6–11	Mar 2012	Indian Wells Open, U.S.	Premier M	Hard	(India) Sania Mirza	(United States) Liezel Huber (United States) Lisa Raymond	2–6, 3–6
Loss	6–12	May 2012	Madrid Open, Spain	Premier M	Clay (blue)	(Russia) Ekaterina Makarova	(Italy) Sara Errani (Italy) Roberta Vinci	6–1, 3–6, [10–4]
Loss	6–13	May 2012	Italian Open, Italy	Premier 5	Clay	(Russia) Ekaterina Makarova	(Italy) Sara Errani (Italy) Roberta Vinci	2–6, 5–7
Win	7–13	Oct 2012	China Open, China	Premier M	Hard	(Russia) Ekaterina Makarova	(Spain) Nuria Llagostera Vives (India) Sania Mirza	7–5, 7–5
Win	8–13	Oct 2012	Kremlin Cup, Russia	Premier	Hard (i)	(Russia) Ekaterina Makarova	(Russia) Maria Kirilenko (Russia) Nadia Petrova	6–3, 1–6, [10–8]
Win	9–13	Mar 2013	Indian Wells Open, U.S. (3)	Premier M	Hard	(Russia) Ekaterina Makarova	(Russia) Nadia Petrova (Slovenia) Katarina Srebotnik	6–0, 5–7, [10–6]
Win	10–13	Jun 2013	French Open, France	Grand Slam	Clay	(Russia) Ekaterina Makarova	(Italy) Sara Errani (Italy) Roberta Vinci	7–5, 6–2
Loss	10–14	Oct 2013	WTA Finals, Turkey	Finals	Hard (i)	(Russia) Ekaterina Makarova	(Chinese Taipei) Hsieh Su-wei (China) Peng Shuai	4–6, 5–7
Loss	10–15	Jan 2014	Australian Open	Grand Slam	Hard	(Russia) Ekaterina Makarova	(Italy) Sara Errani (Italy) Roberta Vinci	4–6, 6–3, 5–7
Loss	10–16	Mar 2014	Miami Open, U.S.	Premier M	Hard	(Russia) Ekaterina Makarova	(Switzerland) Martina Hingis (Germany) Sabine Lisicki	6–4, 4–6, [5–10]
Win	11–16	Sep 2014	US Open, United States	Grand Slam	Hard	(Russia) Ekaterina Makarova	(Switzerland) Martina Hingis (Italy) Flavia Pennetta	2–6, 6–3, 6–2
Loss	11–17	Mar 2015	Indian Wells Open, U.S.	Premier M	Hard	(Russia) Ekaterina Makarova	(Switzerland) Martina Hingis (India) Sania Mirza	3–6, 4–6
Loss	11–18	Apr 2015	Miami Open, U.S.	Premier M	Hard	(Russia) Ekaterina Makarova	(Switzerland) Martina Hingis (India) Sania Mirza	5–7, 1–6
Loss	11–19	Jul 2015	Wimbledon, UK	Grand Slam	Grass	(Russia) Ekaterina Makarova	(Switzerland) Martina Hingis (India) Sania Mirza	7–5, 6–7^{(4–7)}, 5–7
Win	12–19	Oct 2015	Kremlin Cup, Russia (2)	Premier	Hard (i)	(Russia) Daria Kasatkina	(Romania) Irina-Camelia Begu (Romania) Monica Niculescu	6–3, 6–7^{(7–9)}, [10–5]
Loss	12–20	May 2016	Italian Open, Italy	Premier 5	Clay	(Russia) Ekaterina Makarova	(Switzerland) Martina Hingis (India) Sania Mirza	1–6, 7–6^{(7–5)}, [3–10]
Loss	12–21	Jun 2016	French Open, France	Grand Slam	Clay	(Russia) Ekaterina Makarova	(France) Caroline Garcia (France) Kristina Mladenovic	3–6, 6–2, 4–6
Win	13–21	Jul 2016	Canadian Open, Canada	Premier 5	Hard	(Russia) Ekaterina Makarova	(Romania) Simona Halep (Romania) Monica Niculescu	6–3, 7–6^{(7–5)}
Win	14–21	Aug 2016	Summer Olympics, Brazil	Olympics	Hard	(Russia) Ekaterina Makarova	(Switzerland) Timea Bacsinszky (Switzerland) Martina Hingis	6–4, 6–4
Win	15–21	Oct 2016	WTA Finals, Singapore	Finals	Hard (i)	(Russia) Ekaterina Makarova	(United States) Bethanie Mattek-Sands (Czech Republic) Lucie Šafářová	7–6^{(7–5)}, 6–3
Loss	15–22	Jan 2017	Brisbane International, Australia	Premier	Hard	(Russia) Ekaterina Makarova	(United States) Bethanie Mattek-Sands (India) Sania Mirza	2–6, 3–6
Win	16–22	Feb 2017	Dubai Championships, UAE	Premier 5	Hard	(Russia) Ekaterina Makarova	(Czech Republic) Andrea Hlaváčková (China) Peng Shuai	6–2, 4–6, [10–7]
Loss	16–23	May 2017	Italian Open, Italy	Premier 5	Clay	(Russia) Ekaterina Makarova	(Chinese Taipei) Chan Yung-jan (Switzerland) Martina Hingis	5–7, 6–7^{(4–7)}
Win	17–23	Jul 2017	Wimbledon, UK	Grand Slam	Grass	(Russia) Ekaterina Makarova	(Chinese Taipei) Chan Hao-ching (Romania) Monica Niculescu	6–0, 6–0
Win	18–23	Aug 2017	Canadian Open, Canada	Premier 5	Hard	(Russia) Ekaterina Makarova	(Germany) Anna-Lena Grönefeld (Czech Republic) Květa Peschke	6–0, 6–4
Loss	18–24	Jan 2018	Australian Open, Australia	Grand Slam	Hard	(Russia) Ekaterina Makarova	(Hungary) Tímea Babos (France) Kristina Mladenovic	4–6, 3–6
Loss	18–25	Mar 2018	Indian Wells Open, U.S.	Premier M	Hard	(Russia) Ekaterina Makarova	(Chinese Taipei) Hsieh Su-wei (Czech Republic) Barbora Strýcová	4–6, 4–6
Win	19–25	May 2018	Madrid Open, Spain	Premier M	Clay	(Russia) Ekaterina Makarova	(Hungary) Tímea Babos (France) Kristina Mladenovic	2–6, 6–4, [10–8]
Loss	19–26	Jul 2021	Wimbledon, UK	Grand Slam	Grass	(Russia) Veronika Kudermetova	(Chinese Taipei) Hsieh Su-wei (Belgium) Elise Mertens	6–3, 5–7, 7–9

== ITF Circuit finals ==
=== Singles: 6 (2 titles, 4 runner–ups) ===
Legend
$100,000 tournaments
$25,000 tournaments
$10,000 tournaments

Result	W–L	Date	Tournament	Tier	Surface	Opponent	Score
Loss	0–1	Apr 2003	ITF Istanbul, Turkey	10,000	Hard (i)	(Romania) Magda Mihalache	6–4, 2–6, 2–6
Win	1–1	Jul 2003	ITF Balashikha, Russia	10,000	Clay	(Russia) Daria Chemarda	7–5, 6–3
Loss	1–2	Aug 2003	ITF Bucharest, Romania	10,000	Clay	(Germany) Antonela Voina	4–6, 6–7^{(7–9)}
Win	2–2	Sep 2003	ITF Tbilisi, Georgia	25,000	Clay	(Ukraine) Mariya Koryttseva	6–4, 6–3
Loss	2–3	Jun 2005	ITF Galatina, Italy	25,000	Clay	(Ukraine) Mariya Koryttseva	3–6, 2–6
Loss	2–4	Oct 2012	ITF Poitiers, France	100,000	Hard (i)	(Puerto Rico) Monica Puig	5–7, 6–1, 5–7

=== Doubles: 6 (6 titles) ===
Legend
$50,000 tournaments
$25,000 tournaments
$10,000 tournaments

Result	W–L	Date	Tournament	Tier	Surface	Partner	Opponents	Score
Win	1–0	Jul 2003	ITF Balashikha, Russia	10,000	Clay	(Russia) Daria Chemarda	(France) Iryna Brémond (Russia) Irina Kotkina	7–5, 6–4
Win	2–0	Aug 2003	ITF Bucharest, Romania	10,000	Clay	(Russia) Anna Bastrikova	(Romania) Gabriela Niculescu (Romania) Monica Niculescu	6–4, 6–4
Win	3–0	Aug 2003	ITF Bucharest, Romania	10,000	Clay	(Russia) Anna Bastrikova	(Italy) Nicole Clerico (Russia) Irina Smirnova	6–1, 6–1
Win	4–0	Jun 2004	Open de Marseille, France	50,000	Clay	(Israel) Shahar Pe'er	(France) Kildine Chevalier (Spain) Conchita Martínez Granados	6–1, 6–1
Win	5–0	Aug 2004	ITF Balashikha, Russia	25,000	Hard (i)	(Russia) Maria Goloviznina	(Ukraine) Olena Antypina (Russia) Alla Kudryavtseva	7–5, 6–4
Win	6–0	Sep 2004	ITF Tbilisi, Georgia	25,000	Clay	(Belarus) Darya Kustova	(Russia) Maria Kondratieva (Russia) Ekaterina Kozhokina	6–2, 6–4

== WTA Tour career earnings ==
As of 31 May 2021

Year	Grand Slam titles (Note: Includes singles, doubles and mixed doubles titles.)	WTA titles	Total titles	Earnings ($)	Money list rank
2004	0	0	0	16,711	312
2005	0	0	0	69,892	n/a
2006	0	0	0	264,887	47
2007	0	0	0	278,367	55
2008	0	0	0	365,041	43
2009	0	0	0	662,363	27
2010	0	0	0	473,501	44
2011	0	0	0	718,980	30
2012	0	0	0	828,944	19
2013	0	2	2	1,307,086	16
2014	0	0	0	950,353	26
2015	0	0	0	831,767	38
2016	0	0	0	2,179,415	13
2017	0	1	1	2,727,193	12
2018	0	0	0	453,906	16
2019–20	absent
2021	0	0	0	45,140	187
Career	0	3	3	12,572,154	38

== Billie Jean King Cup participations ==
This table is current through the 2017 Fed Cup

Legend	Meaning
WG W	World Group winner
WG F	World Group final
WG SF	World Group semifinal
WG QF	World Group quarterfinal
WG PO	World Group play-offs

=== Singles (3–3) ===
Edition	Round	Date	Location	Against	Surface	Opponent	W/L	Result
2007	WG W	Sep 2007	Moscow, Russia	Italy	Hard (i)	Mara Santangelo	W	6–2, 6–4
2008	WG SF	Apr 2008	Moscow, Russia	United States	Clay (i)	Ahsha Rolle	L	2–6, 4–6
2013	WG QF	Feb 2013	Moscow, Russia	Japan	Hard (i)	Ayumi Morita	L	4–6, 1–6
2014	WG PO	Apr 2014	Sochi, Russia	Argentina	Clay (i)	Paula Ormaechea	W	6–3, 6–3
2017	WG PO	Apr 2017	Moscow, Russia	Belgium	Clay (i)	Alison Van Uytvanck	W	6–3, 6–4
2017	WG PO	Apr 2017	Moscow, Russia	Belgium	Clay (i)	Elise Mertens	L	4–6, 6–1, 2–6

=== Doubles (10–5) ===
Edition	Round	Date	Location	Against	Surface	Partner	Opponents	W/L	Result
2006	WG PO	Jul 2006	Umag, Croatia	Croatia	Clay	Anna Chakvetadze	Ivana Lisjak; Matea Mezak	L	6–3, 6–7^{(3–7)}, 2–6
2007	WG QF	Apr 2007	Moscow, Russia	Spain	Clay (i)	Nadia Petrova	Lourdes Domínguez Lino; Laura Pous Tió	W	6–1, 4–6, 6–2
2007	WG SF	Jul 2007	Stowe, United States	United States	Hard	Nadia Petrova	Venus Williams; Lisa Raymond	W	7–5, 7–6^{(7–1)}
2008	WG QF	Feb 2008	Ramat HaSharon, Israel	Israel	Hard	Dinara Safina	Tzipi Obziler; Shahar Pe'er	W	6–0, 1–6, 6–4
2008	WG SF	Apr 2008	Moscow, Russia	United States	Clay (i)	Svetlana Kuznetsova	Liezel Huber; Vania King	L	6–7^{(3–7)}, 4–6
2008	WG W	Sep 2008	Moscow, Russia	(Spain)	Clay (i)	Ekaterina Makarova	Nuria Llagostera Vives; Carla Suárez Navarro	W	6–2, 6–1
2011	WG F	Nov 2011	Moscow, Russia	Czech Republic	Hard (i)	Maria Kirilenko	Lucie Hradecká; Květa Peschke	L	4–6, 2–6
2012	WG SF	Apr 2012	Moscow, Russia	Serbia	Clay (i)	Anastasia Pavlyuchenkova	Bojana Jovanovski; Aleksandra Krunić	W	6–4, 6–0
2013	WG QF	Feb 2013	Moscow, Russia	Japan	Hard (i)	Ekaterina Makarova	Misaki Doi; Ayumi Morita	W	6–2, 6–2
2013	WG SF	Apr 2013	Moscow, Russia	Slovakia	Clay (i)	Ekaterina Makarova	Dominika Cibulková; Daniela Hantuchová	W	4–6, 6–3, 6–1
2014	WG PO	Apr 2014	Sochi, Russia	Argentina	Clay (i)	Valeria Solovyeva	Victoria Bosio; Nadia Podoroska	W	6–2, 6–1
2015	WG SF	Apr 2015	Sochi, Russia	Germany	Clay (i)	Anastasia Pavlyuchenkova	Sabine Lisicki; Andrea Petkovic	W	6–2, 6–3
2015	WG F	Nov 2015	Sochi, Russia	Czech Republic	Clay (i)	Anastasia Pavlyuchenkova	Karolína Plíšková; Barbora Strýcová	L	6–4, 3–6, 2–6
2016	WG PO	Apr 2016	Moscow, Russia	Belarus	Clay (i)	Daria Kasatkina	Olga Govortsova; Aryna Sabalenka	W	6–4, 6–2
2017	WG PO	Apr 2017	Moscow, Russia	Belgium	Clay (i)	Daria Kasatkina	Elise Mertens; An-Sophie Mestach	L	1–6, 6–7^{(2–7)}

== Top 10 wins ==
=== Singles ===
#	Player	vsRank	Event	Surface	Round	Score
2009
1.	(Russia) Svetlana Kuznetsova	7	Dubai Championships, UAE	Hard	2R	6–4, 3–6, 6–0
2010
2.	(Russia) Vera Zvonareva	9	Sydney International, Australia	Hard	1R	3–3 ret.
3.	(Italy) Francesca Schiavone	8	Cincinnati Open, U.S.	Hard	2R	6–4, 6–4
2011
4.	(Australia) Samantha Stosur	5	Charleston Open, U.S.	Clay	3R	6–4, 6–1
2013
5.	(China) Li Na	6	Eastbourne International, UK	Grass	QF	7–6^{(7–4)}, 6–3
6.	(Germany) Angelique Kerber	10	Connecticut Open, U.S.	Hard	2R	6–2, 6–4
2016
7.	(Romania) Simona Halep	3	Qatar Open	Hard	2R	6–7^{(1–7)}, 6–4, 6–1
8.	(Switzerland) Belinda Bencic	10	Charleston Open, U.S.	Clay	2R	6–1, 6–1
9.	(Switzerland) Belinda Bencic	8	Eastbourne International, UK	Grass	2R	7–6^{(7–4)}, 7–6^{(7–5)}
2017
10.	(Germany) Angelique Kerber	2	Indian Wells Open, U.S.	Hard	4R	6–3, 6–3
11.	(Russia) Svetlana Kuznetsova	8	Indian Wells Open, U.S.	Hard	F	6–7^{(6–8)}, 7–5, 6–4
2018
12.	(Latvia) Jeļena Ostapenko	6	Dubai Championships, UAE	Hard	2R	6–1, 7–6^{(8–6)}

=== Doubles ===
#	Partner	Opponents	vsRank	Event	Surface	Round	Score
2006
1.	(Russia) Anna Chakvetadze	(Spain) Virginia Ruano Pascual (Argentina) Paola Suárez	4; 32	French Open	Clay	2R	6–2, 2–6, 8–6
2007
2.	(Russia) Elena Likhovtseva	(Spain) Anabel Medina Garrigues (Spain) Virginia Ruano Pascual	19; 10	Hobert International, Australia	Hard	F	2–6, 6–1, 6–2
2008
3.	(Belarus) Victoria Azarenka	(Chinese Taipei) Yung-Jan Chan (Chinese Taipei) Chia-Jung Chuang	12; 9	Charleston Open, United States	Clay	QF	6–2, 1–6, [10–2]
2010
4.	(Russia) Vera Zvonareva	(United States) Serena Williams (United States) Venus Williams	1; 1	Wimbledon, UK	Grass	QF	3–6, 6–3, 6–4
5.	(Russia) Vera Zvonareva	(Argentina) Gisela Dulko (Italy) Flavia Pennetta	9; 10	Wimbledon, UK	Grass	SF	6–3, 6–1
2011
6.	(India) Sania Mirza	(United States) Liezel Huber (United States) Lisa Raymond	3; 10	Charleston Open, United States	Clay	1R	6–3, 6–4
7.	(India) Sania Mirza	(Russia) Nadia Petrova (Australia) Anastasia Rodionova	8; 28	Madrid Open, Spain	Clay	2R	6–3, 7–5
8.	(India) Sania Mirza	(Argentina) Gisela Dulko (Italy) Flavia Pennetta	2; 1	French Open	Clay	QF	6–0, 7–5
9.	(India) Sania Mirza	(United States) Liezel Huber (United States) Lisa Raymond	3; 13	French Open	Clay	SF	6–3, 2–6, 6–4
2012
10.	(India) Sania Mirza	(United States) Liezel Huber (United States) Lisa Raymond	1; 4	Australian Open	Hard	QF	6–3, 5–7, 7–6^{(8–6)}
11.	(India) Sania Mirza	(Czech Republic) Andrea Hlaváčková (Czech Republic) Lucie Hradecká	10; 11	Indian Wells, United States	Hard	SF	5–7, 7–5, [10–3]
12.	(Russia) Ekaterina Makarova	(Czech Republic) Andrea Hlaváčková (Czech Republic) Lucie Hradecká	7; 8	Madrid Open, Spain	Clay	2R	6–3, 6–2
13.	(Russia) Ekaterina Makarova	(Russia) Maria Kirilenko (Russia) Nadia Petrova	7; 10	China Open	Hard	SF	6–4, 7–5
14.	(Russia) Ekaterina Makarova	(Russia) Maria Kirilenko (Russia) Nadia Petrova	8; 10	Kremlin Cup, Russia	Hard	F	6–3, 1–6, [10–8]
2013
15.	(Russia) Ekaterina Makarova	(Russia) Nadia Petrova (Slovenia) Katarina Srebotnik	3; 12	Indian Wells, United States	Hard	F	6–0, 5–7, [10–6]
16.	(Russia) Ekaterina Makarova	(Czech Republic) Andrea Hlaváčková (Czech Republic) Lucie Hradecká	4; 5	French Open	Clay	SF	6–4, 7–5
17.	(Russia) Ekaterina Makarova	(Italy) Sara Errani (Italy) Roberta Vinci	1; 1	French Open	Clay	F	7–5, 6–2
18.	(Russia) Ekaterina Makarova	(Italy) Sara Errani (Italy) Roberta Vinci	1; 1	WTA Tour Championships	Hard (i)	SF	4–6, 7–5, [10–3]
2014
19.	(Russia) Ekaterina Makarova	(Czech Republic) Andrea Hlaváčková (Czech Republic) Lucie Šafářová	10; 18	Australian Open	Hard	QF	6–2, 2–6, 7–6^{(7–4)}
2015
20.	(Russia) Ekaterina Makarova	(Zimbabwe) Cara Black (United States) Lisa Raymond	10; 68	Eastbourne International, UK	Grass	QF	7–5, 7–5
21.	(Russia) Ekaterina Makarova	(Zimbabwe) Cara Black (United States) Lisa Raymond	9; 65	Wimbledon, UK	Grass	QF	6–3, 4–6, 8–6
22.	(Russia) Ekaterina Makarova	(Hungary) Tímea Babos (France) Kristina Mladenovic	8; 7	Wimbledon, UK	Grass	SF	6–3, 4–6, 6–4
2016
23.	(Russia) Daria Kasatkina	(Switzerland) Martina Hingis (India) Sania Mirza	1; 1	Qatar Open	Hard	QF	2–6, 6–4, [10–5]
24.	(Russia) Ekaterina Makarova	(Czech Republic) Andrea Hlaváčková (Czech Republic) Lucie Hradecká	12; 10	Italian Open	Clay	SF	6–2, 7–5
25.	(Russia) Ekaterina Makarova	(Chinese Taipei) Chan Hao-ching (Chinese Taipei) Chan Yung-jan	6; 5	French Open	Clay	QF	6–1, 6–3
26.	(Russia) Ekaterina Makarova	(Switzerland) Timea Bacsinszky (Switzerland) Martina Hingis	379; 1	Rio Summer Olympics	Hard	F	6–4, 6–4
27.	(Russia) Ekaterina Makarova	(Czech Republic) Andrea Hlaváčková (Czech Republic) Lucie Hradecká	9; 10	WTA Finals, Singapore	Hard (i)	QF	6–2, 7–5
28.	(Russia) Ekaterina Makarova	(Switzerland) Martina Hingis (India) Sania Mirza	4; 1	WTA Finals, Singapore	Hard (i)	SF	3–6, 6–2, [10–6]
29.	(Russia) Ekaterina Makarova	(United States) Bethanie Mattek-Sands (Czech Republic) Lucie Šafářová	5; 6	WTA Finals, Singapore	Hard (i)	F	7–6^{(7–5)}, 6–3
2017
30.	(Russia) Ekaterina Makarova	(India) Sania Mirza (Czech Republic) Barbora Strýcová	7; 10	Dubai Championships, UAE	Hard	SF	6–4, 6–3
31.	(Russia) Ekaterina Makarova	(Czech Republic) Andrea Hlaváčková (China) Shuai Peng	8; 13	Dubai Championships, UAE	Hard	F	6–2, 4–6, [10–7]
32.	(Russia) Ekaterina Makarova	(Hungary) Tímea Babos (Czech Republic) Andrea Hlaváčková	11; 8	Italian Open	Clay	SF	6–3, 6–7^{(4–7)}, [10–8]
33.	(Russia) Ekaterina Makarova	(Australia) Ashleigh Barty (Australia) Casey Dellacqua	13; 10	Wimbledon, UK	Grass	QF	6–4, 4–6, 6–4
34.	(Russia) Ekaterina Makarova	(Canada) Gabriela Dabrowski (China) Yifan Xu	7; 9	WTA Finals, Singapore	Hard (i)	QF	6–1, 6–1
2018
35.	(Russia) Ekaterina Makarova	(Canada) Gabriela Dabrowski (China) Yifan Xu	7; 9	Australian Open	Hard	QF	0–6, 6–1, 7–6^{(7–2)}
36.	(Russia) Ekaterina Makarova	(Hungary) Tímea Babos (France) Kristina Mladenovic	5; 15	Indian Wells, United States	Hard	SF	6–4, 6–2
37.	(Russia) Ekaterina Makarova	(Hungary) Tímea Babos (France) Kristina Mladenovic	1; 10	Madrid, Spain	Clay	F	2–6, 6–4, [10–8]
