= 2008 Pacific Life Open – Men's doubles =

Men's doubles
- 2008 Pacific Life Open

Final
- Champions: (Israel) Jonathan Erlich (Israel) Andy Ram
- Runners-up: (Canada) Daniel Nestor (Serbia) Nenad Zimonjić
- Score: 6–4, 6–4

Events
Singles	men	women
Doubles	men	women
- Pacific Life Open

Martin Damm & Leander Paes were the defending champions. They were both present but did not compete together.
Damm partnered with Pavel Vízner, but lost in the first round to Eric Butorac and Andy Murray.
Paes partnered with Paul Hanley, but lost in the quarterfinals to Daniel Nestor and Nenad Zimonjić.

Jonathan Erlich and Andy Ram won in the final 6–4, 6–4 against Daniel Nestor and Nenad Zimonjić.

== Seeds ==
1. (United States) Bob Bryan / (United States) Mike Bryan (quarterfinals)
2. (Sweden) Simon Aspelin / (Austria) Julian Knowle (first round)
3. (Canada) Daniel Nestor / (Serbia) Nenad Zimonjić (final)
4. (Israel) Jonathan Erlich / (Israel) Andy Ram (champions)
5. (Czech Republic) Martin Damm / (Czech Republic) Pavel Vízner (first round)
6. (India) Mahesh Bhupathi / (The Bahamas) Mark Knowles (quarterfinals)
7. (France) Arnaud Clément / (France) Michaël Llodra (second round)
8. (Australia) Paul Hanley / (India) Leander Paes (quarterfinals)

== Draw ==
Key

- Q = Qualifier
- WC = Wild card
- LL = Lucky loser
- Alt = Alternate
- ITF = ITF entry
- PR = Protected ranking
- SR = Special ranking
- SE = Special exempt
- JE = Junior exempt
- JR = Junior Accelerator Programme entrant
- CO = College Accelerator Programme entrant
- NG = Next Gen Accelerator Program entrant
- w/o = Walkover
- r = Retired
- d = Defaulted

=== Finals ===
Semifinals
(Belarus) Max Mirnyi (United Kingdom) Jamie Murray	3	4
4	(Israel) Jonathan Erlich (Israel) Andy Ram	6	6
3	(Canada) Daniel Nestor (Serbia) Nenad Zimonjić	7	6
(Serbia) Novak Djokovic (Sweden) Robert Lindstedt	5	2

Final
4	(Israel) Jonathan Erlich (Israel) Andy Ram	6	6
3	(Canada) Daniel Nestor (Serbia) Nenad Zimonjić	4	4

=== Top half ===
First round
1	(United States) B Bryan (United States) M Bryan	4	6	[11]
(Cyprus) M Baghdatis (Switzerland) S Wawrinka	6	3	[9]
(South Africa) J Coetzee (South Africa) W Moodie	3	6	[10]
(Germany) P Kohlschreiber (Finland) J Nieminen	6	3	[4]
(Croatia) I Ljubičić (Spain) T Robredo	4	6^{3}
(Belarus) M Mirnyi (United Kingdom) J Murray	6	7^{7}
(Brazil) M Melo (Brazil) A Sá	3	7	[2]
7	(France) A Clément (France) M Llodra	6	5	[10]
4	(Israel) J Erlich (Israel) A Ram	6	6
(Argentina) JI Chela (Argentina) S Prieto	1	2
(France) P-H Mathieu (Czech Republic) R Štěpánek	7	7^{8}
WC	(United States) M Fish (United States) S Querrey	5	6^{6}
(Czech Republic) T Berdych (Czech Republic) L Dlouhý	4	6^{3}
(Russia) N Davydenko (Germany) N Kiefer	6	7^{7}
(Germany) C Kas (Netherlands) R Wassen	3	6^{3}
6	(India) M Bhupathi (The Bahamas) M Knowles	6	7^{7}

Second round
1	(United States) B Bryan (United States) M Bryan	6	6
(South Africa) J Coetzee (South Africa) W Moodie	3	2
(Belarus) M Mirnyi (United Kingdom) J Murray	7^{7}	6
7	(France) A Clément (France) M Llodra	6^{4}	4
4	(Israel) J Erlich (Israel) A Ram	6	6
(France) P-H Mathieu (Czech Republic) R Štěpánek	2	1
(Russia) N Davydenko (Germany) N Kiefer	3	4
6	(India) M Bhupathi (The Bahamas) M Knowles	6	6

Quarterfinals
1	(United States) B Bryan (United States) M Bryan	7	4	[6]
(Belarus) M Mirnyi (United Kingdom) J Murray	5	6	[10]
4	(Israel) J Erlich (Israel) A Ram	6	6
6	(India) M Bhupathi (The Bahamas) M Knowles	3	4

Semifinals
(Belarus) M Mirnyi (United Kingdom) J Murray	3	4
4	(Israel) J Erlich (Israel) A Ram	6	6

=== Bottom half ===
First round
8	(Australia) P Hanley (India) L Paes	6	6
(Spain) D Ferrer (Spain) R Nadal	3	4
(Argentina) G Cañas (Argentina) D Nalbandian	7	6
(Poland) M Fyrstenberg (Poland) M Matkowski	5	3
(Argentina) J Mónaco (Italy) P Starace	6	6
(France) J Benneteau (France) N Mahut	4	4
(Chile) F González (Russia) D Tursunov	3	1
3	(Canada) D Nestor (Serbia) N Zimonjić	6	6
5	(Czech Republic) M Damm (Czech Republic) P Vízner	6^{5}	3
(United States) E Butorac (United Kingdom) A Murray	7^{7}	6
(Serbia) N Djokovic (Sweden) R Lindstedt	4	6	[10]
WC	(France) S Grosjean (France) J-W Tsonga	6	2	[7]
(Czech Republic) L Friedl (Russia) M Youzhny	2	6	[7]
(Sweden) J Björkman (Zimbabwe) K Ullyett	6	2	[10]
(Czech Republic) F Čermák (Australia) J Kerr	6	6^{1}	[10]
2	(Sweden) S Aspelin (Austria) J Knowle	4	7^{7}	[5]

Second round
8	(Australia) P Hanley (India) L Paes	7	2	[10]
(Argentina) G Cañas (Argentina) D Nalbandian	5	6	[5]
(Argentina) J Mónaco (Italy) P Starace	7^{7}	2	[1]
3	(Canada) D Nestor (Serbia) N Zimonjić	6^{5}	6	[10]
(United States) E Butorac (United Kingdom) A Murray	4	4
(Serbia) N Djokovic (Sweden) R Lindstedt	6	6
(Sweden) J Björkman (Zimbabwe) K Ullyett	7^{7}	3	[10]
(Czech Republic) F Čermák (Australia) J Kerr	6^{2}	6	[3]

Quarterfinals
8	(Australia) P Hanley (India) L Paes	2	1
3	(Canada) D Nestor (Serbia) N Zimonjić	6	6
(Serbia) N Djokovic (Sweden) R Lindstedt	6	4	[13]
(Sweden) J Björkman (Zimbabwe) K Ullyett	3	6	[11]

Semifinals
3	(Canada) D Nestor (Serbia) N Zimonjić	7	6
(Serbia) N Djokovic (Sweden) R Lindstedt	5	2
