= 2012 BNP Paribas Open – Women's singles =

Women's singles
- 2012 BNP Paribas Open

Final
- Champion: (Belarus) Victoria Azarenka
- Runner-up: (Russia) Maria Sharapova
- Score: 6–2, 6–3

Details
- Draw: 96
- Seeds: 32

Events
Singles	men	women
Doubles	men	women
← 2011 ·	BNP Paribas Open	· 2013 →

Victoria Azarenka defeated Maria Sharapova in the final, 6–2, 6–3 to win the women's singles tennis title at the 2012 Indian Wells Masters.

Caroline Wozniacki was the defending champion, but was defeated in the fourth round by Ana Ivanović.

== Seeds ==
All seeds received a bye into the second round.

1. (Belarus) Victoria Azarenka (champion)
2. (Russia) Maria Sharapova (final)
3. (Czech Republic) Petra Kvitová (third round)
4. (Denmark) Caroline Wozniacki (fourth round)
5. (Poland) Agnieszka Radwańska (quarterfinals)
6. (Australia) Samantha Stosur (third round)
7. (France) Marion Bartoli (quarterfinals)
8. (China) Li Na (quarterfinals)
9. (Russia) Vera Zvonareva (third round, withdrew because of an intestinal illness)
10. (Italy) Francesca Schiavone (third round, retired because of an illness)
11. (Germany) Sabine Lisicki (second round)
12. (Serbia) Jelena Janković (second round)
13. (Russia) Anastasia Pavlyuchenkova (second round)
14. (Germany) Julia Görges (fourth round)
15. (Serbia) Ana Ivanovic (semifinals, retired because of a hip injury)
16. (Slovakia) Dominika Cibulková (third round)
17. (China) Peng Shuai (second round)
18. (Germany) Angelique Kerber (semifinals)
19. (Slovakia) Daniela Hantuchová (second round)
20. (Russia) Maria Kirilenko (quarterfinals)
21. (Italy) Roberta Vinci (fourth round)
22. (Belgium) Yanina Wickmayer (second round)
23. (Czech Republic) Lucie Šafářová (fourth round)
24. (Spain) Anabel Medina Garrigues (third round)
25. (Russia) Svetlana Kuznetsova (third round)
26. (Romania) Monica Niculescu (second round)
27. (Italy) Flavia Pennetta (third round)
28. (Czech Republic) Petra Cetkovská (second round)
29. (Estonia) Kaia Kanepi (second round)
30. (Russia) Nadia Petrova (fourth round)
31. (China) Zheng Jie (third round)
32. (United States) Christina McHale (fourth round)

== Draw ==
=== Key ===
- Q = Qualifier
- WC = Wild card
- LL = Lucky loser
- Alt = Alternate
- SE = Special exempt
- PR = Protected ranking
- ITF = ITF entry
- JE = Junior exempt
- w/o = Walkover
- r = Retired
- d = Defaulted
- SR = Special ranking

=== Finals ===
Quarterfinals
1	(Belarus) Victoria Azarenka	6	6
5	(Poland) Agnieszka Radwańska	0	2
18	(Germany) Angelique Kerber	6	6
8	(China) Li Na	4	2
7	(France) Marion Bartoli	3	4
15	(Serbia) Ana Ivanovic	6	6
20	(Russia) Maria Kirilenko	6	5	2
2	(Russia) Maria Sharapova	3	7	6

Semifinals
1	(Belarus) Victoria Azarenka	6	6
18	(Germany) Angelique Kerber	4	3
15	(Serbia) Ana Ivanovic	4	1^{r}
2	(Russia) Maria Sharapova	6	0

Final
1	(Belarus) Victoria Azarenka	6	6
2	(Russia) Maria Sharapova	2	3

=== Top half ===
==== Section 1 ====
First round
WC	(United States) J Craybas	1	2
(Germany) M Barthel	6	6
(United Kingdom) A Keothavong	4	6	5
PR	(Switzerland) T Bacsinszky	6	2	7
Q	(Germany) K Barrois	6	2	4
WC	(India) S Mirza	4	6	6
(United Kingdom) E Baltacha	3	6	6
(Netherlands) A Rus	6	4	3

Second round
1	(Belarus) V Azarenka	6	6^{4}	7^{8}
(Germany) M Barthel	4	7^{7}	6^{6}
PR	(Switzerland) T Bacsinszky	3	0^{r}
25	(Russia) S Kuznetsova	6	2
24	(Spain) A Medina Garrigues	6	7
WC	(India) S Mirza	2	5
(United Kingdom) E Baltacha	3	2
14	(Germany) J Görges	6	6

Third round
1	(Belarus) V Azarenka	6	6
25	(Russia) S Kuznetsova	1	2
24	(Spain) A Medina Garrigues	3	4
14	(Germany) J Görges	6	6

Fourth round
1	(Belarus) V Azarenka	6	6
14	(Germany) J Görges	3	1

==== Section 2 ====
First round
WC	(United States) J Hampton	6	6
(Slovenia) P Hercog	0	1
(Australia) J Gajdošová	4	6	6
WC	(United States) C Vandeweghe	6	3	3
(Bulgaria) T Pironkova	4	2
(Spain) C Suárez Navarro	6	6
(Romania) S Cîrstea	4	7	7^{7}
(Czech Republic) I Benešová	6	5	6^{5}

Second round
12	(Serbia) J Janković	4	3
WC	(United States) J Hampton	6	6
(Australia) J Gajdošová	2	6	6
22	(Belgium) Y Wickmayer	6	2	4
27	(Italy) F Pennetta	6	6
(Spain) C Suárez Navarro	3	4
(Romania) S Cîrstea	2	4
5	(Poland) A Radwańska	6	6

Third round
WC	(United States) J Hampton	6	6^{1}	6
(Australia) J Gajdošová	2	7^{7}	2
27	(Italy) F Pennetta	4	2
5	(Poland) A Radwańska	6	6

Fourth round
WC	(United States) J Hampton	3	6	0^{r}
5	(Poland) A Radwańska	6	4	3

==== Section 3 ====
First round
(Japan) A Morita	6	1	4
(Czech Republic) B Záhlavová-Strýcová	2	6	6
Q	(Australia) C Dellacqua	4	5
(Russia) E Vesnina	6	7
WC	(United States) S Stephens	4	7	7^{9}
Q	(Canada) A Wozniak	6	5	6^{7}
(United States) V King	7^{7}	6
(Italy) S Errani	6^{3}	4

Second round
3	(Czech Republic) P Kvitová	6	6
(Czech Republic) B Záhlavová-Strýcová	1	3
(Russia) E Vesnina	3	5
32	(United States) C McHale	6	7
18	(Germany) A Kerber	2	7	6
WC	(United States) S Stephens	6	5	4
(United States) V King	6	6
13	(Russia) A Pavlyuchenkova	4	4

Third round
3	(Czech Republic) P Kvitová	6	2	3
32	(United States) C McHale	2	6	6
18	(Germany) A Kerber	w/o
(United States) V King

Fourth round
32	(United States) C McHale	3	6	6^{4}
18	(Germany) A Kerber	6	3	7^{7}

==== Section 4 ====
First round
(Japan) K Date-Krumm	6	6
(France) P Parmentier	1	3
(Spain) L Pous Tió	1	1
(Czech Republic) K Zakopalová	6	6
WC	(Poland) U Radwańska	6	4	4
Q	(Netherlands) M Krajicek	3	6	6
(New Zealand) M Erakovic	7	3	5
(Kazakhstan) G Voskoboeva	5	6	7

Second round
9	(Russia) V Zvonareva	6	6
(Japan) K Date-Krumm	3	4
(Czech Republic) K Zakopalová	6	6^{7}	6
19	(Slovakia) D Hantuchová	3	7^{9}	3
31	(China) J Zheng	6	6
Q	(Netherlands) M Krajicek	1	3
(Kazakhstan) G Voskoboeva	6	3	3
8	(China) N Li	3	6	6

Third round
9	(Russia) V Zvonareva
(Czech Republic) K Zakopalová	w/o
31	(China) J Zheng	1	3
8	(China) N Li	6	6

Fourth round
(Czech Republic) K Zakopalová	1	0
8	(China) N Li	6	6

=== Bottom half ===
==== Section 5 ====
First round
Q	(United States) V Lepchenko	7^{7}	6
Q	(Russia) A Panova	6^{3}	2
(France) M Johansson	3	3
(South Africa) C Scheepers	6	6
(Austria) T Paszek	6	2	6
(Belarus) A Yakimova	4	6	1
Q	(Ukraine) L Tsurenko	4	6	7
(Israel) S Pe'er	6	3	5

Second round
7	(France) M Bartoli	2	6	7
Q	(United States) V Lepchenko	6	2	5
(South Africa) C Scheepers	6	6
29	(Estonia) K Kanepi	3	2
23	(Czech Republic) L Šafářová	6	3
(Austria) T Paszek	3	1^{r}
Q	(Ukraine) L Tsurenko	2	4
10	(Italy) F Schiavone	6	6

Third round
7	(France) M Bartoli	6	6
(South Africa) C Scheepers	2	0
23	(Czech Republic) L Šafářová	6	0
10	(Italy) F Schiavone	2	0^{r}

Fourth round
7	(France) M Bartoli	6	6
23	(Czech Republic) L Šafářová	1	4

==== Section 6 ====
First round
Q	(Hungary) G Arn	1^{r}
(Sweden) J Larsson	4
(Kazakhstan) K Pervak	6	6
Q	(Belarus) O Govortsova	3	1
Q	(Greece) E Daniilidou	4	6^{4}
(Sweden) S Arvidsson	6	7^{7}
(Russia) E Makarova	6	6
(United States) B Mattek-Sands	2	3

Second round
15	(Serbia) A Ivanovic	6	6
(Sweden) J Larsson	1	2
(Kazakhstan) K Pervak	6	6
17	(China) S Peng	4	0
26	(Romania) M Niculescu	3	3
(Sweden) S Arvidsson	6	6
(Russia) E Makarova	2	0
4	(Denmark) C Wozniacki	6	6

Third round
15	(Serbia) A Ivanovic	6^{8}	6	6
(Kazakhstan) K Pervak	7^{10}	3	2
(Sweden) S Arvidsson	6	5	2
4	(Denmark) C Wozniacki	3	7	6

Fourth round
15	(Serbia) A Ivanovic	6	6
4	(Denmark) C Wozniacki	3	2

==== Section 7 ====
First round
WC	(United States) I Falconi	4	5
(Romania) A Dulgheru	6	2^{r}
WC	(United States) L Davis	6	7^{9}
(Croatia) P Martić	2	6^{7}
(Romania) I-C Begu	4	7	6
(Czech Republic) L Hradecká	6	5	2
(Spain) MJ Martínez Sánchez	3	6	5
(Spain) L Domínguez Lino	6	1	7

Second round
6	(Australia) S Stosur	6	6
WC	(United States) I Falconi	0	3
WC	(United States) L Davis	3	2
30	(Russia) N Petrova	6	6
20	(Russia) M Kirilenko	7^{7}	6
(Romania) I-C Begu	6^{4}	4
(Spain) L Domínguez Lino	6	6
11	(Germany) S Lisicki	1	4

Third round
6	(Australia) S Stosur	1	7^{8}	6^{5}
30	(Russia) N Petrova	6	6^{6}	7^{7}
20	(Russia) M Kirilenko	6	4	6
(Spain) L Domínguez Lino	2	6	4

Fourth round
30	(Russia) N Petrova	1	7	2
20	(Russia) M Kirilenko	6	5	6

==== Section 8 ====
First round
Q	(United States) J Pegula	7	3	3
(Slovakia) M Rybáriková	5	6	6
(Italy) A Brianti	3	6	6^{4}
(Spain) S Soler Espinosa	6	1	7^{7}
Q	(China) S Zhang	1	1
(Romania) S Halep	6	6
(Argentina) G Dulko	1
(Australia) J Dokić	0^{r}

Second round
16	(Slovakia) D Cibulková	2
(Slovakia) M Rybáriková	1^{r}
(Spain) S Soler Espinosa	3	3
21	(Italy) R Vinci	6	6
28	(Czech Republic) P Cetkovská	2	4
(Romania) S Halep	6	6
(Argentina) G Dulko	2	0
2	(Russia) M Sharapova	6	6

Third round
16	(Slovakia) D Cibulková	7^{7}	0	4
21	(Italy) R Vinci	6^{5}	6	6
(Romania) S Halep	3	4
2	(Russia) M Sharapova	6	6

Fourth round
21	(Italy) R Vinci	2	1
2	(Russia) M Sharapova	6	6

== Qualifying ==
=== Seeds ===
1. (Hungary) Gréta Arn (qualified)
2. (Ukraine) Kateryna Bondarenko (first round)
3. (Netherlands) Michaëlla Krajicek (qualified)
4. (Georgia (country)) Anna Tatishvili (first round)
5. (Belarus) Olga Govortsova (qualified)
6. (Canada) Aleksandra Wozniak (qualified)
7. (Greece) Eleni Daniilidou (qualified)
8. (Russia) Vera Dushevina (first round)
9. (United States) Varvara Lepchenko (qualified)
10. (Russia) Alexandra Panova (qualified)
11. (France) Virginie Razzano (qualifying competition)
12. (Canada) Stéphanie Dubois (first round)
13. (France) Stéphanie Foretz Gacon (qualifying competition)
14. (Luxembourg) Mandy Minella (qualifying competition)
15. (Russia) Nina Bratchikova (first round)
16. (Australia) Anastasia Rodionova (qualifying competition)
17. (Russia) Alla Kudryavtseva (qualifying competition)
18. (Romania) Edina Gallovits-Hall (qualifying competition)
19. (Chinese Taipei) Chang Kai-chen (first round)
20. (Australia) Casey Dellacqua (qualified)
21. (Czech Republic) Eva Birnerová (first round)
22. (Serbia) Bojana Jovanovski (first round)
23. (France) Alizé Cornet (qualifying competition)
24. (Germany) Kristina Barrois (qualified)

=== Qualifiers ===
1. (Hungary) Gréta Arn
2. (United States) Jessica Pegula
3. (Netherlands) Michaëlla Krajicek
4. (Australia) Casey Dellacqua
5. (Belarus) Olga Govortsova
6. (Canada) Aleksandra Wozniak
7. (Greece) Eleni Daniilidou
8. (China) Zhang Shuai
9. (United States) Varvara Lepchenko
10. (Russia) Alexandra Panova
11. (Germany) Kristina Barrois
12. (Ukraine) Lesia Tsurenko

=== Key ===
- Q = Qualifier
- WC = Wild card
- LL = Lucky loser
- Alt = Alternate
- SE = Special exempt
- PR = Protected ranking
- ITF = ITF entry
- JE = Junior exempt
- w/o = Walkover
- r = Retired
- d = Defaulted
- SR = Special ranking

==== First qualifier ====
First round
1	(Hungary) Gréta Arn	7^{7}	6
WC	(United States) Madison Keys	6^{4}	1
WC	(United States) Julia Cohen	6	7
21	(Czech Republic) Eva Birnerová	1	5

Qualifying competition
1	(Hungary) Gréta Arn	6	2	6
WC	(United States) Julia Cohen	0	6	4

==== Second qualifier ====
First round
2	(Ukraine) Kateryna Bondarenko	6^{3}	4
(Argentina) Paula Ormaechea	7^{7}	6
WC	(United States) Jessica Pegula	7^{7}	7^{7}
22	(Serbia) Bojana Jovanovski	6^{4}	6^{5}

Qualifying competition
(Argentina) Paula Ormaechea	2	2
WC	(United States) Jessica Pegula	6	6

==== Third qualifier ====
First round
3	(Netherlands) Michaëlla Krajicek	4	6	6
(Austria) Yvonne Meusburger	6	1	2
WC	(United States) Gail Brodsky	3	6	2
14	(Luxembourg) Mandy Minella	6	3	6

Qualifying competition
3	(Netherlands) Michaëlla Krajicek	6	5	6
14	(Luxembourg) Mandy Minella	4	7	3

==== Fourth qualifier ====
First round
4	(Georgia (country)) Anna Tatishvili	3	4
(Japan) Misaki Doi	6	6
(United Kingdom) Laura Robson	3	1
20	(Australia) Casey Dellacqua	6	6

Qualifying competition
(Japan) Misaki Doi	3	3
20	(Australia) Casey Dellacqua	6	6

==== Fifth qualifier ====
First round
5	(Belarus) Olga Govortsova	6	6^{6}	6
(Kazakhstan) Sesil Karatantcheva	3	7^{8}	2
(Czech Republic) Andrea Hlaváčková	6^{6}	6	6
15	(Russia) Nina Bratchikova	7^{8}	2	1

Qualifying competition
5	(Belarus) Olga Govortsova	6	6
(Czech Republic) Andrea Hlaváčková	4	1

==== Sixth qualifier ====
First round
6	(Canada) Aleksandra Wozniak	6	6
(United Kingdom) Heather Watson	4	4
(Russia) Evgeniya Rodina	2	5
16	(Australia) Anastasia Rodionova	6	7

Qualifying competition
6	(Canada) Aleksandra Wozniak	6	6
16	(Australia) Anastasia Rodionova	3	1

==== Seventh qualifier ====
First round
7	(Greece) Eleni Daniilidou	6	6
(United States) Tetiana Luzhanska	2	4
WC	(Puerto Rico) Monica Puig	6	6
19	(Chinese Taipei) Chang Kai-chen	2	4

Qualifying competition
7	(Greece) Eleni Daniilidou	7^{7}	6
WC	(Puerto Rico) Monica Puig	6^{1}	1

==== Eighth qualifier ====
First round
8	(Russia) Vera Dushevina	6	3	2
(China) Zhang Shuai	4	6	6
(Spain) Arantxa Parra Santonja	7	0	2
23	(France) Alizé Cornet	5	6	6

Qualifying competition
(China) Zhang Shuai	2	7^{7}	7^{7}
23	(France) Alizé Cornet	6	6^{4}	6^{3}

==== Ninth qualifier ====
First round
9	(United States) Varvara Lepchenko	6	6
(Australia) Olivia Rogowska	1	3
(Czech Republic) Karolína Plíšková	5	2
18	(Romania) Edina Gallovits-Hall	7	6

Qualifying competition
9	(United States) Varvara Lepchenko	6	6
18	(Romania) Edina Gallovits-Hall	1	1

==== Tenth qualifier ====
First round
10	(Russia) Alexandra Panova	6	6
WC	(France) Caroline Garcia	4	4
(Uzbekistan) Akgul Amanmuradova	4	7	5
13	(France) Stéphanie Foretz Gacon	6	5	7

Qualifying competition
10	(Russia) Alexandra Panova	6	0
13	(France) Stéphanie Foretz Gacon	2	0^{r}

==== Eleventh qualifier ====
First round
11	(France) Virginie Razzano	6	6
(Croatia) Mirjana Lučić	4	2
(France) Aravane Rezaï	7^{7}	2	1
24	(Germany) Kristina Barrois	6^{3}	6	6

Qualifying competition
11	(France) Virginie Razzano	3	3
24	(Germany) Kristina Barrois	6	6

==== Twelfth qualifier ====
First round
12	(Canada) Stéphanie Dubois	6	6^{5}	3
(Ukraine) Lesia Tsurenko	3	7^{7}	6
(Hungary) Melinda Czink	6	2	2
17	(Russia) Alla Kudryavtseva	4	6	6

Qualifying competition
(Ukraine) Lesia Tsurenko	6	6
17	(Russia) Alla Kudryavtseva	3	1
