= 2013 Mutua Madrid Open – Women's singles =

Women's singles
- 2013 Mutua Madrid Open

Final
- Champion: (United States) Serena Williams
- Runner-up: (Russia) Maria Sharapova
- Score: 6–1, 6–4

Events
| Singles | men | women |
| Doubles | men | women |
| ← 2012 · | Mutua Madrid Open | · 2014 → |

Defending champion Serena Williams defeated Maria Sharapova in the final, 6–1, 6–4 to win the women's singles tennis title at the 2013 Madrid Open.

== Seeds ==
1. (United States) Serena Williams (champion)
2. (Russia) Maria Sharapova (final)
3. (Belarus) Victoria Azarenka (second round)
4. (Poland) Agnieszka Radwańska (second round)
5. (China) Li Na (first round)
6. (Germany) Angelique Kerber (quarterfinals)
7. (Italy) Sara Errani (semifinals)
8. (Czech Republic) Petra Kvitová (second round)
9. (Australia) Samantha Stosur (first round)
10. (Denmark) Caroline Wozniacki (first round)
11. (Russia) Nadia Petrova (second round)
12. (Italy) Roberta Vinci (first round)
13. (Russia) Maria Kirilenko (third round)
14. (France) Marion Bartoli (third round)
15. (Slovakia) Dominika Cibulková (second round)
16. (Serbia) Ana Ivanovic (semifinals)

== Draw ==
=== Key ===
- Q = Qualifier
- WC = Wild card
- LL = Lucky loser
- Alt = Alternate
- SE = Special exempt
- PR = Protected ranking
- ITF = ITF entry
- JE = Junior exempt
- w/o = Walkover
- r = Retired
- d = Defaulted
- SR = Special ranking

=== Finals ===
Quarterfinals
1 | (United States) Serena Williams | 6 | 0 | 7
WC | (Spain) Anabel Medina Garrigues | 3 | 6 | 5
(Russia) Ekaterina Makarova | 4 | 3
7 | (Italy) Sara Errani | 6 | 6
6 | (Germany) Angelique Kerber | 3 | 1
16 | (Serbia) Ana Ivanovic | 6 | 6
(Estonia) Kaia Kanepi | 2 | 4
2 | (Russia) Maria Sharapova | 6 | 6

Semifinals
1 | (United States) Serena Williams | 7 | 6
7 | (Italy) Sara Errani | 5 | 2
16 | (Serbia) Ana Ivanovic | 4 | 3
2 | (Russia) Maria Sharapova | 6 | 6

Final
1 | (United States) Serena Williams | 6 | 6
2 | (Russia) Maria Sharapova | 1 | 4

=== Top half ===
==== Section 1 ====
First round
1 | (United States) S Williams | 7^{7} | 6
Q | (Kazakhstan) Y Putintseva | 6^{5} | 1
WC | (Spain) L Domínguez Lino | 6 | 4 | 6
WC | (Romania) S Halep | 2 | 6 | 4
(France) K Mladenovic | 6 | 6
WC | (Spain) S Soler Espinosa | 1 | 1
(Czech Republic) K Zakopalová | 3 | 1^{r}
13 | (Russia) M Kirilenko | 6 | 2
10 | (Denmark) C Wozniacki | 2 | 4
(Kazakhstan) Y Shvedova | 6 | 6
(Germany) M Barthel | 4 | 1
(Belgium) K Flipkens | 6 | 6
LL | (Switzerland) S Vögele | 3 | 3
WC | (Spain) A Medina Garrigues | 6 | 6
LL | (United States) M Keys | 6 | 6
5 | (China) N Li | 3 | 2

Second round
1 | (United States) S Williams | 6 | 7
WC | (Spain) L Domínguez Lino | 2 | 5
(France) K Mladenovic | 7^{7} | 1 | 4
13 | (Russia) M Kirilenko | 6^{5} | 6 | 6
(Kazakhstan) Y Shvedova | 6 | 4 | 6
(Belgium) K Flipkens | 2 | 6 | 4
WC | (Spain) A Medina Garrigues | 7^{7} | 6
LL | (United States) M Keys | 6^{3} | 3

Third round
1 | (United States) S Williams | 6 | 6
13 | (Russia) M Kirilenko | 3 | 1
(Kazakhstan) Y Shvedova
WC | (Spain) A Medina Garrigues | w/o

Quarterfinals
1 | (United States) S Williams | 6 | 0 | 7
WC | (Spain) A Medina Garrigues | 3 | 6 | 5

==== Section 2 ====
First round
3 | (Belarus) V Azarenka | 7^{10} | 7^{7}
(Russia) A Pavlyuchenkova | 6^{8} | 6^{3}
(Czech Republic) L Šafářová | 2 | 5
(Russia) E Makarova | 6 | 7
Q | (Spain) MT Torró Flor | 6 | 7
(Italy) F Schiavone | 2 | 5
(Russia) E Vesnina | 3 | 0^{r}
14 | (France) M Bartoli | 6 | 3
12 | (Italy) R Vinci | 1 | 6 | 2
(United States) V Lepchenko | 6 | 1 | 6
(Germany) J Görges | 6 | 6
(Serbia) B Jovanovski | 4 | 1
(Japan) A Morita | 0^{r}
(Romania) S Cîrstea | 3
(Poland) U Radwańska | 3 | 1
7 | (Italy) S Errani | 6 | 6

Second round
3 | (Belarus) V Azarenka | 6 | 2 | 3
(Russia) E Makarova | 1 | 6 | 6
Q | (Spain) MT Torró Flor | 4 | 6 | 4
14 | (France) M Bartoli | 6 | 2 | 6
(United States) V Lepchenko | w/o
(Germany) J Görges
(Romania) S Cîrstea | 5 | 6 | 4
7 | (Italy) S Errani | 7 | 2 | 6

Third round
(Russia) E Makarova | 6 | 6
14 | (France) M Bartoli | 3 | 2
(United States) V Lepchenko | 5 | 3
7 | (Italy) S Errani | 7 | 6

Quarterfinals
(Russia) E Makarova | 4 | 3
7 | (Italy) S Errani | 6 | 6

=== Bottom half ===
==== Section 3 ====
First round
6 | (Germany) A Kerber | 3 | 6 | 6
(Chinese Taipei) S-w Hsieh | 6 | 3 | 2
(France) A Cornet | 7 | 7^{10}
(Netherlands) K Bertens | 5 | 6^{8}
(China) J Zheng | 2 | 3
(Russia) S Kuznetsova | 6 | 6
Q | (Italy) C Giorgi | 3 | 6 | 4
11 | (Russia) N Petrova | 6 | 4 | 6
16 | (Serbia) A Ivanovic | 6^{10} | 6 | 6
Q | (United States) B Mattek-Sands | 7^{12} | 3 | 2
(Serbia) J Janković | 7^{7} | 3 | 3
Q | (South Africa) C Scheepers | 6^{1} | 6 | 6
(Slovakia) M Rybáriková | 7^{7} | 2 | 2
(United Kingdom) L Robson | 6^{4} | 6 | 6
(Bulgaria) T Pironkova | 2 | 4
4 | (Poland) A Radwańska | 6 | 6

Second round
6 | (Germany) A Kerber | 6 | 6
(France) A Cornet | 4 | 2
(Russia) S Kuznetsova | 7^{7} | 4 | 6
11 | (Russia) N Petrova | 6^{2} | 6 | 4
16 | (Serbia) A Ivanovic | 6 | 6
Q | (South Africa) C Scheepers | 2 | 2
(United Kingdom) L Robson | 6 | 6
4 | (Poland) A Radwańska | 3 | 1

Third round
6 | (Germany) A Kerber | 3 | 6 | 7
(Russia) S Kuznetsova | 6 | 4 | 5
16 | (Serbia) A Ivanovic | 5 | 6 | 7^{7}
(United Kingdom) L Robson | 7 | 2 | 6^{5}

Quarterfinals
6 | (Germany) A Kerber | 3 | 1
16 | (Serbia) A Ivanovic | 6 | 6

==== Section 4 ====
First round
8 | (Czech Republic) P Kvitová | 4 | 7 | 6
(Belgium) Y Wickmayer | 6 | 5 | 4
(United States) S Stephens | 3 | 5
WC | (Slovakia) D Hantuchová | 6 | 7
(Italy) F Pennetta | 3 | 7^{8} | 2
(Estonia) K Kanepi | 6 | 6^{6} | 6
(Spain) C Suárez Navarro | 7^{9} | 6
9 | (Australia) S Stosur | 6^{7} | 2
15 | (Slovakia) D Cibulková | 6 | 6
Q | (Ukraine) L Tsurenko | 3 | 2
(Germany) S Lisicki | 6 | 6
(Sweden) S Arvidsson | 3 | 1
Q | (United States) C McHale | 7 | 5 | 6
(China) S Peng | 5 | 7 | 1
Q | (Romania) A Dulgheru | 5 | 2
2 | (Russia) M Sharapova | 7 | 6

Second round
8 | (Czech Republic) P Kvitová | 6 | 2 | 3
WC | (Slovakia) D Hantuchová | 2 | 6 | 6
(Estonia) K Kanepi | 6 | 6
(Spain) C Suárez Navarro | 3 | 1
15 | (Slovakia) D Cibulková | 6^{4} | 6^{3}
(Germany) S Lisicki | 7^{7} | 7^{7}
Q | (United States) C McHale | 1 | 2
2 | (Russia) M Sharapova | 6 | 6

Third round
WC | (Slovakia) D Hantuchová | 3 | 4
(Estonia) K Kanepi | 6 | 6
(Germany) S Lisicki | 2 | 5
2 | (Russia) M Sharapova | 6 | 7

Quarterfinals
(Estonia) K Kanepi | 2 | 4
2 | (Russia) M Sharapova | 6 | 6

== Qualifying ==
=== Seeds ===
1. (Romania) Monica Niculescu (first round)
2. (United States) Christina McHale (qualified)
3. (Switzerland) Stefanie Vögele (qualifying competition, lucky loser)
4. (Czech Republic) Lucie Hradecká (first round)
5. (Germany) Annika Beck (first round)
6. (South Africa) Chanelle Scheepers (qualified)
7. (Belarus) Olga Govortsova (first round)
8. (United States) Madison Keys (qualifying competition, lucky loser)
9. (Sweden) Johanna Larsson (qualifying competition)
10. (United States) Lauren Davis (first round)
11. (Georgia (country)) Anna Tatishvili (first round)
12. (New Zealand) Marina Erakovic (first round)
13. (Ukraine) Lesia Tsurenko (qualified)
14. (United States) Bethanie Mattek-Sands (qualified)
15. (United States) Jamie Hampton (first round)
16. (Czech Republic) Karolína Plíšková (first round)

=== Qualifiers ===
1. (Spain) María Teresa Torró Flor
2. (United States) Christina McHale
3. (Ukraine) Lesia Tsurenko
4. (Kazakhstan) Yulia Putintseva
5. (Romania) Alexandra Dulgheru
6. (South Africa) Chanelle Scheepers
7. (Italy) Camila Giorgi
8. (United States) Bethanie Mattek-Sands

=== Lucky losers ===
1. (Switzerland) Stefanie Vögele
2. (United States) Madison Keys

=== Qualifying draw ===
==== First qualifier ====
First round
1 | (Romania) Monica Niculescu | 1 | 5
(Spain) María Teresa Torró Flor | 6 | 7
(Portugal) Maria João Koehler | 7^{7} | 3 | 4
9 | (Sweden) Johanna Larsson | 6^{3} | 6 | 6

Qualifying competition
(Spain) María Teresa Torró Flor | 6 | 6
9 | (Sweden) Johanna Larsson | 3 | 1

==== Second qualifier ====
First round
2 | (United States) Christina McHale | 6 | 7^{7}
(Czech Republic) Andrea Hlaváčková | 4 | 6^{4}
(France) Mathilde Johansson | 6 | 6
10 | (United States) Lauren Davis | 1 | 4

Qualifying competition
2 | (United States) Christina McHale | 6 | 6
(France) Mathilde Johansson | 2 | 4

==== Third qualifier ====
First round
3 | (Switzerland) Stefanie Vögele | 6 | 6
(Russia) Olga Puchkova | 2 | 4
(United States) Mallory Burdette | 4 | 7 | 2
13 | (Ukraine) Lesia Tsurenko | 6 | 5 | 6

Qualifying competition
3 | (Switzerland) Stefanie Vögele | 6^{4} | 4
13 | (Ukraine) Lesia Tsurenko | 7^{7} | 6

==== Fourth qualifier ====
First round
4 | (Czech Republic) Lucie Hradecká | 1 | 6 | 5
(Kazakhstan) Yulia Putintseva | 6 | 3 | 7
WC | (France) Aravane Rezaï | 7 | 4 | 6
11 | (Georgia (country)) Anna Tatishvili | 5 | 6 | 4

Qualifying competition
(Kazakhstan) Yulia Putintseva | 3 | 6 | 7^{7}
WC | (France) Aravane Rezaï | 6 | 3 | 6^{5}

==== Fifth qualifier ====
First round
5 | (Germany) Annika Beck | 5 | 3
WC | (Spain) Sara Sorribes Tormo | 7 | 6
WC | (Romania) Alexandra Dulgheru | 4 | 6 | 6
12 | (New Zealand) Marina Erakovic | 6 | 2 | 4

Qualifying competition
WC | (Spain) Sara Sorribes Tormo | 2 | 6 | 2
WC | (Romania) Alexandra Dulgheru | 6 | 1 | 6

==== Sixth qualifier ====
First round
6 | (South Africa) Chanelle Scheepers | 7^{9} | 6
(Croatia) Donna Vekić | 6^{7} | 2
(United States) Melanie Oudin | 4 | 6 | 6
16 | (Czech Republic) Karolína Plíšková | 6 | 1 | 2

Qualifying competition
6 | (South Africa) Chanelle Scheepers | 6 | 6
(United States) Melanie Oudin | 3 | 1

==== Seventh qualifier ====
First round
7 | (Belarus) Olga Govortsova | 6 | 0 | 1
(Italy) Camila Giorgi | 2 | 6 | 6
(Spain) Garbiñe Muguruza | 6 | 6
15 | (United States) Jamie Hampton | 3 | 3

Qualifying competition
(Italy) Camila Giorgi | 6 | 1 | 6
(Spain) Garbiñe Muguruza | 2 | 6 | 3

==== Eighth qualifier ====
First round
8 | (United States) Madison Keys | 6 | 6
(Croatia) Mirjana Lučić-Baroni | 0 | 2
WC | (Germany) Andrea Petkovic | 3 | 5
14 | (United States) Bethanie Mattek-Sands | 6 | 7

Qualifying competition
8 | (United States) Madison Keys | 2 | 5
14 | (United States) Bethanie Mattek-Sands | 6 | 7
