= 2008 Pacific Life Open – Women's doubles =

Women's doubles
- 2008 Pacific Life Open

Final
- Champions: (Russia) Dinara Safina (Russia) Elena Vesnina
- Runners-up: (China) Yan Zi (China) Zheng Jie
- Score: 6–1, 1–6, 10–8

Events
Singles	men	women
Doubles	men	women
- Pacific Life Open

Lisa Raymond and Samantha Stosur were the defending champions, but Stosur chose not to participate, and only Raymond competed that year.
Raymond partnered with Maria Kirilenko, but lost in the first round to Daniela Hantuchová and Ai Sugiyama.

Dinara Safina and Elena Vesnina won in the final 6–1, 1–6, 10–8 against Yan Zi and Zheng Jie.

== Seeds ==
1. (Czech Republic) Květa Peschke / (Australia) Rennae Stubbs (second round)
2. (Chinese Taipei) Yung-jan Chan / (Chinese Taipei) Chia-jung Chuang (quarterfinals)
3. (China) Yan Zi / (China) Zheng Jie (final)
4. (Ukraine) Alona Bondarenko / (Ukraine) Kateryna Bondarenko (quarterfinals)
5. (Argentina) Gisela Dulko / (Israel) Shahar Pe'er (second round, withdrew)
6. (China) Peng Shuai / (China) Sun Tiantian (first round)
7. (United States) Bethanie Mattek / (India) Sania Mirza (semifinals)
8. (Slovakia) Daniela Hantuchová / (Japan) Ai Sugiyama (semifinals)

== Draw ==
Key

- Q = Qualifier
- WC = Wild card
- LL = Lucky loser
- Alt = Alternate
- ITF = ITF entry
- PR = Protected ranking
- SR = Special ranking
- SE = Special exempt
- JE = Junior exempt
- JR = Junior Accelerator Programme entrant
- CO = College Accelerator Programme entrant
- NG = Next Gen Accelerator Program entrant
- w/o = Walkover
- r = Retired
- d = Defaulted

=== Finals ===
Semifinals
8	(Slovakia) Daniela Hantuchová (Japan) Ai Sugiyama	3	4
(Russia) Dinara Safina (Russia) Elena Vesnina	6	6
3	(China) Yan Zi (China) Zheng Jie	6^{4}	7	[10]
7	(United States) Bethanie Mattek (India) Sania Mirza	7	5	[5]

Final
(Russia) Dinara Safina (Russia) Elena Vesnina	6	1	[10]
3	(China) Yan Zi (China) Zheng Jie	1	6	[8]

=== Top half ===
First round
1	(Czech Republic) K Peschke (Australia) R Stubbs	6	6
SR	(Japan) A Morigami (Japan) A Nakamura	3	2
(Ukraine) M Koryttseva (Czech Republic) V Uhlířová	6	7
(Germany) M Müller (Czech Republic) B Záhlavová-Strýcová	1	5
(Poland) A Rosolska (Tunisia) S Sfar	6	3	[11]
(France) N Dechy (Russia) V Zvonareva	4	6	[9]
(Russia) M Kirilenko (United States) L Raymond	1	5
8	(Slovakia) D Hantuchová (Japan) A Sugiyama	6	7
4	(Ukraine) A Bondarenko (Ukraine) K Bondarenko	6	6
(Slovakia) J Gajdošová (Australia) B Stewart	3	1
WC	(Russia) S Kuznetsova (France) A Mauresmo	7	6
(United States) J Craybas (Russia) A Jidkova	6^{3}	2
(Greece) E Daniilidou (Germany) J Wöhr	6	6
(Russia) A Kudryavtseva (Russia) G Voskoboeva	2	1
(Russia) D Safina (Russia) E Vesnina	4	6	[10]
6	(China) S Peng (China) T Sun	6	1	[4]

Second round
1	(Czech Republic) K Peschke (Australia) R Stubbs	6	4	[8]
(Ukraine) M Koryttseva (Czech Republic) V Uhlířová	1	6	[10]
(Poland) A Rosolska (Tunisia) S Sfar	1	0
8	(Slovakia) D Hantuchová (Japan) A Sugiyama	6	6
4	(Ukraine) A Bondarenko (Ukraine) K Bondarenko	6	3	[10]
WC	(Russia) S Kuznetsova (France) A Mauresmo	3	6	[3]
(Greece) E Daniilidou (Germany) J Wöhr	2	3
(Russia) D Safina (Russia) E Vesnina	6	6

Quarterfinals
(Ukraine) M Koryttseva (Czech Republic) V Uhlířová	6^{7}	3
8	(Slovakia) D Hantuchová (Japan) A Sugiyama	7	6
4	(Ukraine) A Bondarenko (Ukraine) K Bondarenko	6	5	[7]
(Russia) D Safina (Russia) E Vesnina	3	7	[10]

Semifinals
8	(Slovakia) D Hantuchová (Japan) A Sugiyama	3	4
(Russia) D Safina (Russia) E Vesnina	6	6

=== Bottom half ===
First round
5	(Argentina) G Dulko (Israel) S Pe'er	6	6
(Ukraine) T Perebiynis (Czech Republic) R Voráčová	4	4
WC	(United States) M Oudin (United States) C Vandeweghe	1	2
(Czech Republic) I Benešová (Poland) A Radwańska	6	6
(Chinese Taipei) S-w Hsieh (United States) V King	1	2
(Italy) F Pennetta (Italy) F Schiavone	6	6
(Italy) T Garbin (Netherlands) M Krajicek	4	6^{3}
3	(China) Z Yan (China) J Zheng	6	7
7	(United States) B Mattek (India) S Mirza	6	6
(Czech Republic) G Navrátilová (Poland) K Jans	3	2
(Belarus) T Poutchek (Russia) A Rodionova	6	6
SR	(United States) A Haynes (United States) M Washington	4	3
(Spain) A Medina Garrigues (Argentina) ME Salerni	5	3
WC	(United States) C Fusano (United States) R Kops-Jones	7	6
(France) É Loit (United States) M Tu	2	6	[10]
2	(Chinese Taipei) Y-j Chan (Chinese Taipei) C-j Chuang	6	4	[12]

Second round
5	(Argentina) G Dulko (Israel) S Pe'er
(Czech Republic) I Benešová (Poland) A Radwańska	w/o
(Italy) F Pennetta (Italy) F Schiavone	6	1	[2]
3	(China) Z Yan (China) J Zheng	4	6	[10]
7	(United States) B Mattek (India) S Mirza	6	4	[10]
(Belarus) T Poutchek (Russia) A Rodionova	2	6	[7]
WC	(United States) C Fusano (United States) R Kops-Jones	5	4
2	(Chinese Taipei) Y-j Chan (Chinese Taipei) C-j Chuang	7	6

Quarterfinals
(Czech Republic) I Benešová (Poland) A Radwańska	0	4
3	(China) Z Yan (China) J Zheng	6	6
7	(United States) B Mattek (India) S Mirza	7	4	[11]
2	(Chinese Taipei) Y-j Chan (Chinese Taipei) C-j Chuang	5	6	[9]

Semifinals
3	(China) Z Yan (China) J Zheng	6^{4}	7	[10]
7	(United States) B Mattek (India) S Mirza	7	5	[5]
