= 2012 Mutua Madrid Open – Women's singles =

Women's singles
- 2012 Mutua Madrid Open

Final
- Champion: (United States) Serena Williams
- Runner-up: (Belarus) Victoria Azarenka
- Score: 6–1, 6–3

Events
Singles	men	women
Doubles	men	women
← 2011 ·	Mutua Madrid Open	· 2013 →

Serena Williams defeated Victoria Azarenka in the final, 6–1, 6–3 to win the women's singles tennis title at the 2012 Madrid Open. It was Azarenka's second consecutive runner-up finish at the event.

Petra Kvitová was the defending champion, but lost to Lucie Hradecká in the second round.

== Seeds ==
1. (Belarus) Victoria Azarenka (final)
2. (Russia) Maria Sharapova (quarterfinals)
3. (Czech Republic) Petra Kvitová (second round)
4. (Poland) Agnieszka Radwańska (semifinals)
5. (Australia) Samantha Stosur (quarterfinals)
6. (Denmark) Caroline Wozniacki (third round)
7. (France) Marion Bartoli (first round)
8. (China) Li Na (quarterfinals)

9. (United States) Serena Williams (champion)
10. (Russia) Vera Zvonareva (first round)
11. (Italy) Francesca Schiavone (first round)
12. (Germany) Angelique Kerber (third round)
13. (Serbia) Ana Ivanovic (third round)
14. (Slovakia) Dominika Cibulková (first round)
15. (Serbia) Jelena Janković (first round)
16. (Russia) Maria Kirilenko (second round)

Click on the seed number of a player to go to their draw section.

== Draw ==
=== Key ===
- Q = Qualifier
- WC = Wild card
- LL = Lucky loser
- Alt = Alternate
- SE = Special exempt
- PR = Protected ranking
- ITF = ITF entry
- JE = Junior exempt
- w/o = Walkover
- r = Retired
- d = Defaulted
- SR = Special ranking

=== Finals ===
Quarterfinals
1	(Belarus) Victoria Azarenka	3	6	6
8	(China) Li Na	6	3	3
4	(Poland) Agnieszka Radwańska	6	6
Q	(United States) Varvara Lepchenko	4	4
5	(Australia) Samantha Stosur	6^{8}	6^{6}
Q	(Czech Republic) Lucie Hradecká	7^{10}	7^{8}
9	(United States) Serena Williams	6	6
2	(Russia) Maria Sharapova	1	3

Semifinals
1	(Belarus) Victoria Azarenka	6	6
4	(Poland) Agnieszka Radwańska	2	4
Q	(Czech Republic) Lucie Hradecká	6^{5}	0
9	(United States) Serena Williams	7^{7}	6

Final
1	(Belarus) Victoria Azarenka	1	3
9	(United States) Serena Williams	6	6

=== Top half ===
==== Section 1 ====
First round
1	(Belarus) V Azarenka	7^{7}	6
(Russia) S Kuznetsova	6^{5}	4
Q	(Czech Republic) A Hlaváčková	6	6
Q	(Australia) A Rodionova	1	4
(Russia) N Petrova	4	6	6
(United States) V King	6	3	1
Q	(France) M Johansson	4	1
13	(Serbia) A Ivanovic	6	6
12	(Germany) A Kerber	6	6
Q	(Sweden) J Larsson	1	4
(Romania) S Halep	1	6	6^{6}
WC	(United States) V Williams	6	4	7^{8}
(Austria) T Paszek	7^{7}	2	2
WC	(Spain) S Soler-Espinosa	6^{2}	6	6
WC	(Spain) G Muguruza Blanco	2	4
8	(China) N Li	6	6

Second round
1	(Belarus) V Azarenka	6	7^{7}
Q	(Czech Republic) A Hlaváčková	3	6^{2}
(Russia) N Petrova	5	1
13	(Serbia) A Ivanovic	7	6
12	(Germany) A Kerber	6	6
WC	(United States) V Williams	4	1
WC	(Spain) S Soler-Espinosa	3	1
8	(China) N Li	6	6

Third round
1	(Belarus) V Azarenka	6	6
13	(Serbia) A Ivanovic	4	4
12	(Germany) A Kerber	5	4
8	(China) N Li	7	6

Quarterfinals
1	(Belarus) V Azarenka	3	6	6
8	(China) N Li	6	3	3

==== Section 2 ====
First round
4	(Poland) A Radwańska	6	6
WC	(Spain) L Arruabarrena-Vecino	3	1
(South Africa) C Scheepers	6	2	3
(Italy) S Errani	4	6	6
(Belgium) Y Wickmayer	6	6
(Australia) J Gajdošová	2	4
(Italy) R Vinci	6	6
14	(Slovakia) D Cibulková	3	2
11	(Italy) F Schiavone	4	7^{10}	3
Q	(United States) V Lepchenko	6	6^{8}	6
(Israel) S Pe'er	6	7
(Slovenia) P Hercog	3	5
(Bulgaria) T Pironkova	0	2
(Spain) A Medina Garrigues	6	6
(Romania) S Cîrstea	6^{6}	6	6
7	(France) M Bartoli	7^{8}	4	3

Second round
4	(Poland) A Radwańska	6	6
(Italy) S Errani	0	1
(Belgium) Y Wickmayer	1	2
(Italy) R Vinci	6	6
Q	(United States) V Lepchenko	7^{7}	6
(Israel) S Pe'er	6^{2}	4
(Spain) A Medina Garrigues	6	3	7
(Romania) S Cîrstea	1	6	5

Third round
4	(Poland) A Radwańska	7^{7}	6
(Italy) R Vinci	6^{1}	4
Q	(United States) V Lepchenko	6	6^{3}	6
(Spain) A Medina Garrigues	1	7^{7}	3

Quarterfinals
4	(Poland) A Radwańska	6	6
Q	(United States) V Lepchenko	4	4

=== Bottom half ===
==== Section 3 ====
First round
5	(Australia) S Stosur	7	4	7^{7}
(Croatia) P Martić	5	6	6^{5}
(Sweden) S Arvidsson	4	5
(United States) C McHale	6	7
(Romania) M Niculescu	0	6^{6}
Q	(Spain) L Domínguez Lino	6	7^{8}
(Czech Republic) P Cetkovská	6	6
10	(Russia) V Zvonareva	2	2
16	(Russia) M Kirilenko	6	7
(China) J Zheng	2	5
(Russia) E Makarova	6	7^{7}
(Kazakhstan) G Voskoboeva	2	6^{3}
(China) S Peng	4	7	4
Q	(Czech Republic) L Hradecká	6	5	6
(New Zealand) M Erakovic	2	3
3	(Czech Republic) P Kvitová	6	6

Second round
5	(Australia) S Stosur	2	6	6
(United States) C McHale	6	4	0
Q	(Spain) L Domínguez Lino	4	5
(Czech Republic) P Cetkovská	6	7
16	(Russia) M Kirilenko	4	4
(Russia) E Makarova	6	6
Q	(Czech Republic) L Hradecká	6	6
3	(Czech Republic) P Kvitová	4	3

Third round
5	(Australia) S Stosur	6	6
(Czech Republic) P Cetkovská	3	2
(Russia) E Makarova	2	6^{5}
Q	(Czech Republic) L Hradecká	6	7^{7}

Quarterfinals
5	(Australia) S Stosur	6^{8}	6^{6}
Q	(Czech Republic) L Hradecká	7^{10}	7^{8}

==== Section 4 ====
First round
6	(Denmark) C Wozniacki	7^{9}	3	6
(Kazakhstan) K Pervak	6^{7}	6	4
(Germany) M Barthel	6	6
(Germany) J Görges	4	1
(Russia) A Pavlyuchenkova	6	6^{6}	6
Q	(United States) J Craybas	2	7^{8}	1
(Russia) E Vesnina	3	1
9	(United States) S Williams	6	6
15	(Serbia) J Janković	6	6^{5}	4
WC	(Spain) C Suárez Navarro	4	7^{7}	6
(Czech Republic) L Šafářová	6	6
(Estonia) K Kanepi	4	4
(Czech Republic) I Benešová	4	6^{5}
(Czech Republic) K Zakopalová	6	7^{7}
(Romania) I-C Begu	0	3
2	(Russia) M Sharapova	6	6

Second round
6	(Denmark) C Wozniacki	6	7^{7}
(Germany) M Barthel	4	6^{2}
(Russia) A Pavlyuchenkova	2	1
9	(United States) S Williams	6	6
WC	(Spain) C Suárez Navarro	3	4
(Czech Republic) L Šafářová	6	6
(Czech Republic) K Zakopalová	4	3
2	(Russia) M Sharapova	6	6

Third round
6	(Denmark) C Wozniacki	6	3	2
9	(United States) S Williams	1	6	6
(Czech Republic) L Šafářová
2	(Russia) M Sharapova	w/o

Quarterfinals
9	(United States) S Williams	6	6
2	(Russia) M Sharapova	1	3

== Qualifying ==
=== Seeds ===
1. (France) Pauline Parmentier (qualifying competition)
2. (Czech Republic) Barbora Záhlavová-Strýcová (first round)
3. (Greece) Eleni Daniilidou (first round)
4. (Chinese Taipei) Hsieh Su-wei (qualifying competition)
5. (Hungary) Gréta Arn (first round)
6. (Russia) Vera Dushevina (first round)
7. (United States) Varvara Lepchenko (qualified)
8. (Sweden) Johanna Larsson (qualified)
9. (United States) Sloane Stephens (first round)
10. (France) Mathilde Johansson (qualified)
11. (Australia) Anastasia Rodionova (qualified)
12. (Czech Republic) Lucie Hradecká (qualified)
13. (Serbia) Bojana Jovanovski (first round)
14. (Spain) Laura Pous Tió (qualifying competition)
15. (United States) Bethanie Mattek-Sands (first round)
16. (Spain) Lourdes Domínguez Lino (qualified)

=== Qualifiers ===
1. (Australia) Anastasia Rodionova
2. (France) Mathilde Johansson
3. (United States) Jill Craybas
4. (Czech Republic) Andrea Hlaváčková
5. (Czech Republic) Lucie Hradecká
6. (Spain) Lourdes Domínguez Lino
7. (United States) Varvara Lepchenko
8. (Sweden) Johanna Larsson

=== Qualifying draw ===
==== First qualifier ====
First round
1	(France) Pauline Parmentier	6	6
(Argentina) Paula Ormaechea	1	1
(Argentina) Gisela Dulko	6	5	3
11	(Australia) Anastasia Rodionova	2	7	6

Qualifying competition
1	(France) Pauline Parmentier	7^{7}	1	2
11	(Australia) Anastasia Rodionova	6^{2}	6	6

==== Second qualifier ====
First round
2	(Czech Republic) Barbora Záhlavová-Strýcová	4	3
(Colombia) Mariana Duque-Mariño	6	6
(Spain) Arantxa Parra Santonja	3	1
10	(France) Mathilde Johansson	6	6

Qualifying competition
(Colombia) Mariana Duque-Mariño	6^{2}	6^{5}
10	(France) Mathilde Johansson	7^{7}	7^{7}

==== Third qualifier ====
First round
3	(Greece) Eleni Daniilidou	7	3	1
(United States) Jill Craybas	5	6	6
Alt	(Poland) Marta Domachowska	7^{7}	7
13	(Serbia) Bojana Jovanovski	6^{4}	5

Qualifying competition
(United States) Jill Craybas	7	6
Alt	(Poland) Marta Domachowska	5	0

==== Fourth qualifier ====
First round
4	(Chinese Taipei) Hsieh Su-wei	6	6
WC	(Spain) Leticia Costas-Moreira	0	1
(Czech Republic) Andrea Hlaváčková	7^{9}	6
9	(United States) Sloane Stephens	6^{7}	3

Qualifying competition
4	(Chinese Taipei) Hsieh Su-wei	3	7^{7}	3
(Czech Republic) Andrea Hlaváčková	6	6^{5}	6

==== Fifth qualifier ====
First round
5	(Hungary) Gréta Arn	3	1
(Russia) Alla Kudryavtseva	6	6
WC	(Spain) Inés Ferrer Suárez	4	2
12	(Czech Republic) Lucie Hradecká	6	6

Qualifying competition
(Russia) Alla Kudryavtseva	3	6	4
12	(Czech Republic) Lucie Hradecká	6	1	6

==== Sixth qualifier ====
First round
6	(Russia) Vera Dushevina	3	3
WC	(Spain) Estrella Cabeza Candela	6	6
(Kazakhstan) Sesil Karatantcheva	3	3
16	(Spain) Lourdes Domínguez Lino	6	6

Qualifying competition
WC	(Spain) Estrella Cabeza Candela	3	4
16	(Spain) Lourdes Domínguez Lino	6	6

==== Seventh qualifier ====
First round
7	(United States) Varvara Lepchenko	6	6
WC	(Spain) Sara Sorribes Tormo	4	1
(Italy) Maria Elena Camerin	2	5
14	(Spain) Laura Pous Tió	6	7

Qualifying competition
7	(United States) Varvara Lepchenko	6	6
14	(Spain) Laura Pous Tió	2	2

==== Eighth qualifier ====
First round
8	(Sweden) Johanna Larsson	5	6	6
(Ukraine) Lesia Tsurenko	7	4	4
PR	(Russia) Anna Chakvetadze	6	6
15	(United States) Bethanie Mattek-Sands	4	4

Qualifying competition
8	(Sweden) Johanna Larsson	2	6	7
PR	(Russia) Anna Chakvetadze	6	4	5
