= 2012 Mutua Madrid Open – Women's doubles =

Women's doubles
- 2012 Mutua Madrid Open

Final
- Champions: (Italy) Sara Errani (Italy) Roberta Vinci
- Runners-up: (Russia) Ekaterina Makarova (Russia) Elena Vesnina
- Score: 6–1, 3–6, [10–4]

Events
Singles	men	women
Doubles	men	women
← 2011 ·	Mutua Madrid Open	· 2013 →

Victoria Azarenka and Maria Kirilenko were the defending champions but Azarenka chose not to participate in doubles this year.
Kirilenko played with Nadia Petrova but lost in the semifinals to eventual champions Sara Errani and Roberta Vinci. Vinci and Errani won the title after defeating Ekaterina Makarova and Elena Vesnina in the final by 6–1, 3–6, [10–4] to win their first ever WTA tier I tournament.

== Seeds ==
The top four seeds receive a bye into the second round.

1. (United States) Liezel Huber / (United States) Lisa Raymond (second round)
2. (Czech Republic) Květa Peschke / (Slovenia) Katarina Srebotnik (quarterfinals)
3. (Czech Republic) Andrea Hlaváčková / (Czech Republic) Lucie Hradecká (second round)
4. (Russia) Maria Kirilenko / (Russia) Nadia Petrova (semifinals)
5. (Italy) Sara Errani / (Italy) Roberta Vinci (champions)
6. (India) Sania Mirza / (Australia) Anastasia Rodionova (first round)
7. (Kazakhstan) Yaroslava Shvedova / (Kazakhstan) Galina Voskoboeva (quarterfinals)
8. (Czech Republic) Iveta Benešová / (Czech Republic) Barbora Záhlavová-Strýcová (first round)

== Draw ==
=== Key ===
- Q = Qualifier
- WC = Wild card
- LL = Lucky loser
- Alt = Alternate
- SE = Special exempt
- PR = Protected ranking
- ITF = ITF entry
- JE = Junior exempt
- w/o = Walkover
- r = Retired
- d = Defaulted
- SR = Special ranking

=== Finals ===
Semifinals

Final

5
- (Italy) Sara Errani
- (Italy) Roberta Vinci
7
6^{4}
[10]

4
- (Russia) Maria Kirilenko
- (Russia) Nadia Petrova
5
7^{7}
[5]

5
- (Italy) Sara Errani
- (Italy) Roberta Vinci
6
3
[10]

- (Russia) Ekaterina Makarova
- (Russia) Elena Vesnina
1
6
[4]

- (Russia) Ekaterina Makarova
- (Russia) Elena Vesnina
6
7^{7}

- (Spain) Nuria Llagostera Vives
- (Spain) María José Martínez Sánchez
4
6^{4}

=== Top half ===
First round

Second round

Quarterfinals

Semifinals

1
- (United States) L Huber
- (United States) L Raymond
6
6^{6}
[13]

- (South Africa) N Grandin
- (Czech Republic) V Uhlířová
3
7^{8}
[7]

WC
- (Slovakia) D Cibulková
- (Slovakia) J Husárová
4
7^{8}
[15]

WC
- (Slovakia) D Cibulková
- (Slovakia) J Husárová
6
6^{6}
[10]

WC
- (Slovakia) D Cibulková
- (Slovakia) J Husárová
4
5

WC
- (Russia) A Pavlyuchenkova
- (Czech Republic) L Šafářová
6
7^{7}

5
- (Italy) S Errani
- (Italy) R Vinci
6
7

- (Israel) S Pe'er
- (Romania) I-C Begu
3
6^{3}

WC
- (Russia) A Pavlyuchenkova
- (Czech Republic) L Šafářová
1
3

- (Poland) K Jans-Ignacik
- (Russia) A Kudryavtseva
4
3

5
- (Italy) S Errani
- (Italy) R Vinci
6
6

5
- (Italy) S Errani
- (Italy) R Vinci
6
6

5
- (Italy) S Errani
- (Italy) R Vinci
7
6^{4}
[10]

4
- (Russia) M Kirilenko
- (Russia) N Petrova
5
7^{7}
[5]

4
- (Russia) M Kirilenko
- (Russia) N Petrova
6
6

- (New Zealand) M Erakovic
- (Romania) M Niculescu
w/o

- (New Zealand) M Erakovic
- (Romania) M Niculescu
3
2

- (Slovenia) P Hercog
- (United States) V King

4
- (Russia) M Kirilenko
- (Russia) N Petrova
6
6

- (Russia) S Kuznetsova
- (Poland) A Radwańska
5
3

7
- (Kazakhstan) Y Shvedova
- (Kazakhstan) G Voskoboeva
1
2

- (Spain) A Medina Garrigues
- (Spain) A Parra Santonja
7
6

- (Spain) A Medina Garrigues
- (Spain) A Parra Santonja
3
2

- (United States) R Kops-Jones
- (United States) A Spears
3
5

7
- (Kazakhstan) Y Shvedova
- (Kazakhstan) G Voskoboeva
6
6

7
- (Kazakhstan) Y Shvedova
- (Kazakhstan) G Voskoboeva
6
7

=== Bottom half ===
First round

Second round

Quarterfinals

Semifinals

6
- (India) S Mirza
- (Australia) A Rodionova
3
2

- (Germany) A-L Grönefeld
- (China) S Zhang
6
6

- (Germany) A-L Grönefeld
- (China) S Zhang
6^{4}
3

- (Slovenia) A Klepač
- (Poland) A Rosolska
2
5

- (Argentina) G Dulko
- (Argentina) P Suárez
7^{7}
6

- (Argentina) G Dulko
- (Argentina) P Suárez
6
7

- (Argentina) G Dulko
- (Argentina) P Suárez
7^{7}
2
[5]

- (Australia) J Gajdošová
- (China) S Peng
4
5

- (Russia) E Makarova
- (Russia) E Vesnina
6^{5}
6
[10]

- (Russia) E Makarova
- (Russia) E Vesnina
6
7

- (Russia) E Makarova
- (Russia) E Vesnina
6
6

3
- (Czech Republic) A Hlaváčková
- (Czech Republic) L Hradecká
3
2

- (Russia) E Makarova
- (Russia) E Vesnina
6
7^{7}

8
- (Czech Republic) I Benešová
- (Czech Republic) B Záhlavová-Strýcová
2
6
[6]

- (Spain) N Llagostera Vives
- (Spain) MJ Martínez Sánchez
4
6^{4}

- (Chinese Taipei) S-w Hsieh
- (China) J Zheng
6
1
[10]

- (Chinese Taipei) S-w Hsieh
- (China) J Zheng
4
4

WC
- (Spain) L Domínguez Lino
- (Spain) L Pous Tió
0
1

- (Spain) N Llagostera Vives
- (Spain) MJ Martínez Sánchez
6
6

- (Spain) N Llagostera Vives
- (Spain) MJ Martínez Sánchez
6
6

- (Spain) N Llagostera Vives
- (Spain) MJ Martínez Sánchez
6
6

- (Germany) J Görges
- (Australia) S Stosur
6
6

2
- (Czech Republic) K Peschke
- (Slovenia) K Srebotnik
3
4

WC
- (Spain) S Soler Espinosa
- (Spain) C Suárez Navarro
3
2

- (Germany) J Görges
- (Australia) S Stosur
2
6
[7]

2
- (Czech Republic) K Peschke
- (Slovenia) K Srebotnik
6
3
[10]
