= 2011 BNP Paribas Open – Women's doubles =

Women's doubles
- 2011 BNP Paribas Open

Final
- Champion: (India) Sania Mirza (Russia) Elena Vesnina
- Runner-up: (United States) Bethanie Mattek-Sands (United States) Meghann Shaughnessy
- Score: 6–0, 7–5

Details
- Draw: 32
- Seeds: 8

Events
Singles	men	women
Doubles	men	women
← 2010 ·	BNP Paribas Open	· 2012 →

The 2011 BNP Paribas Open – Women's doubles was an event of the 2011 BNP Paribas Open tennis tournament. It was the 37th edition of the event, known as the BNP Paribas Open, and was classified as a Premier Mandatory event on the 2011 WTA Tour. The tournament took place at the Indian Wells Tennis Garden in Indian Wells, California, United States from March 7 through March 20, 2011.

The women's doubles draw consisted of 32 teams of which eight were seeded. Květa Peschke and Katarina Srebotnik were the defending champions, but lost in the first round to Klaudia Jans and Alicja Rosolska.
Unseeded pair Sania Mirza and Elena Vesnina won the tournament, defeating 8th seeds Bethanie Mattek-Sands and Meghann Shaughnessy 6–0, 7–5 in the final.

== Seeds ==
1. (Argentina) Gisela Dulko / (Italy) Flavia Pennetta (second round)
2. (Czech Republic) Květa Peschke / (Slovenia) Katarina Srebotnik (first round)
3. (United States) Liezel Huber / (Russia) Nadia Petrova (quarterfinals)
4. (United States) Vania King / (Kazakhstan) Yaroslava Shvedova (quarterfinals)
5. (Chinese Taipei) Chan Yung-jan / (China) Zheng Jie (second round)
6. (Belarus) Victoria Azarenka / (Russia) Maria Kirilenko (semifinals, withdrew due to Azarenka's right leg injury)
7. (Czech Republic) Iveta Benešová / (Czech Republic) Barbora Záhlavová-Strýcová (second round)
8. (United States) Bethanie Mattek-Sands / (United States) Meghann Shaughnessy (final)

== Draw ==
=== Key ===
- Q = Qualifier
- WC = Wild card
- LL = Lucky loser
- Alt = Alternate
- SE = Special exempt
- PR = Protected ranking
- ITF = ITF entry
- JE = Junior exempt
- w/o = Walkover
- r = Retired
- d = Defaulted
- SR = Special ranking

=== Finals ===
Semifinals
6	(Belarus) Victoria Azarenka (Russia) Maria Kirilenko
8	(United States) Bethanie Mattek-Sands (United States) Meghann Shaughnessy	w/o
(Slovakia) Daniela Hantuchová (Poland) Agnieszka Radwańska	0	4
(India) Sania Mirza (Russia) Elena Vesnina	6	6

Final
8	(United States) Bethanie Mattek-Sands (United States) Meghann Shaughnessy	0	5
(India) Sania Mirza (Russia) Elena Vesnina	6	7

=== Top half ===
First round
1	(Argentina) G Dulko (Italy) F Pennetta	7	6
(Romania) M Niculescu (Australia) A Rodionova	6^{4}	3
(Russia) V Dushevina (Russia) E Makarova	4	4
WC	(Serbia) J Janković (Russia) A Pavlyuchenkova	6	6
(Italy) S Errani (Italy) R Vinci	6^{2}	6	[5]
(Italy) F Schiavone (Australia) S Stosur	7	2	[10]
(Spain) N Llagostera Vives (Spain) A Parra Santonja	7	3	[9]
6	(Belarus) V Azarenka (Russia) M Kirilenko	5	6	[11]
3	(United States) L Huber (Russia) N Petrova	6	6
(Slovenia) P Hercog (Chinese Taipei) S-w Hsieh	0	2
(Russia) M Kondratieva (Czech Republic) R Voráčová	1	6	[10]
WC	(Serbia) A Ivanovic (Germany) A Petkovic	6	3	[6]
(United States) R Kops-Jones (United States) A Spears	7	6
(Germany) J Görges (United States) L Raymond	6^{7}	3
(Russia) A Kleybanova (China) Z Yan	1	2
8	(United States) B Mattek-Sands (United States) M Shaughnessy	6	6

Second round
1	(Argentina) G Dulko (Italy) F Pennetta	5	5
WC	(Serbia) J Janković (Russia) A Pavlyuchenkova	7	7
(Italy) F Schiavone (Australia) S Stosur	6	4	[9]
6	(Belarus) V Azarenka (Russia) M Kirilenko	2	6	[11]
3	(United States) L Huber (Russia) N Petrova	6	6
(Russia) M Kondratieva (Czech Republic) R Voráčová	4	0
(United States) R Kops-Jones (United States) A Spears	4	4
8	(United States) B Mattek-Sands (United States) M Shaughnessy	6	6

Quarterfinals
WC	(Serbia) J Janković (Russia) A Pavlyuchenkova	4	5
6	(Belarus) V Azarenka (Russia) M Kirilenko	6	7
3	(United States) L Huber (Russia) N Petrova	4	3
8	(United States) B Mattek-Sands (United States) M Shaughnessy	6	6

Semifinals
6	(Belarus) V Azarenka (Russia) M Kirilenko
8	(United States) B Mattek-Sands (United States) M Shaughnessy	w/o

=== Bottom half ===
First round
5	(Chinese Taipei) Y-j Chan (China) J Zheng	6	4	[10]
(Belarus) O Govortsova (Russia) A Kudryavtseva	3	6	[6]
(Slovakia) D Hantuchová (Poland) A Radwańska	7	6
(Israel) S Pe'er (China) S Peng	6^{3}	3
(Switzerland) T Bacsinszky (Hungary) Á Szávay	4	4
(South Africa) N Grandin (Czech Republic) V Uhlířová	6	6
WC	(Russia) S Kuznetsova (Russia) V Zvonareva	2	3
4	(United States) V King (Kazakhstan) Y Shvedova	6	6
7	(Czech Republic) I Benešová (Czech Republic) B Záhlavová-Strýcová	7	6^{3}	[10]
(Spain) MJ Martínez Sánchez (Spain) A Medina Garrigues	6^{4}	7	[5]
(India) S Mirza (Russia) E Vesnina	6	6
(Czech Republic) A Hlaváčková (Czech Republic) L Hradecká	4	1
(Chinese Taipei) C-j Chuang (Romania) A Dulgheru	6	4	[10]
WC	(United States) J Hampton (United States) M Oudin	3	6	[6]
(Poland) K Jans (Poland) A Rosolska	1	6	[10]
2	(Czech Republic) K Peschke (Slovenia) K Srebotnik	6	2	[5]

Second round
5	(Chinese Taipei) Y-j Chan (China) J Zheng	3	3
(Slovakia) D Hantuchová (Poland) A Radwańska	6	6
(South Africa) N Grandin (Czech Republic) V Uhlířová	7	3	[7]
4	(United States) V King (Kazakhstan) Y Shvedova	6^{4}	6	[10]
7	(Czech Republic) I Benešová (Czech Republic) B Záhlavová-Strýcová	2	3
(India) S Mirza (Russia) E Vesnina	6	6
(Chinese Taipei) C-j Chuang (Romania) A Dulgheru	1	6	[5]
(Poland) K Jans (Poland) A Rosolska	6	4	[10]

Quarterfinals
(Slovakia) D Hantuchová (Poland) A Radwańska	6	6
4	(United States) V King (Kazakhstan) Y Shvedova	1	0
(India) S Mirza (Russia) E Vesnina	6	6
(Poland) K Jans (Poland) A Rosolska	4	1

Semifinals
(Slovakia) D Hantuchová (Poland) A Radwańska	0	4
(India) S Mirza (Russia) E Vesnina	6	6
