= 2012 BNP Paribas Open – Women's doubles =

Women's doubles
- 2012 BNP Paribas Open

Final
- Champion: (United States) Liezel Huber (United States) Lisa Raymond
- Runner-up: (India) Sania Mirza (Russia) Elena Vesnina
- Score: 6–2, 6–3

Events
Singles	men	women
Doubles	men	women
← 2011 ·	BNP Paribas Open	· 2013 →

2012 BNP Paribas Open – Women's doubles was a professional tennis tournament played at Indian Wells, California.

Liezel Huber and Lisa Raymond defeated the defending champions Sania Mirza and Elena Vesnina 6–2, 6–3 in the final.

== Seeds ==
1. (United States) Liezel Huber / (United States) Lisa Raymond (champions)
2. (India) Sania Mirza / (Russia) Elena Vesnina (final)
3. (Czech Republic) Andrea Hlaváčková / (Czech Republic) Lucie Hradecká (semifinals)
4. (Russia) Maria Kirilenko / (Russia) Nadia Petrova (second round)
5. (Italy) Sara Errani / (Italy) Roberta Vinci (quarterfinals)
6. (Spain) Anabel Medina Garrigues / (Italy) Flavia Pennetta (first round)
7. (Spain) Nuria Llagostera Vives / (Spain) Arantxa Parra Santonja (second round)
8. (Germany) Anna-Lena Grönefeld / (United States) Vania King (second round, withdrew because of an illness contracted by King)

== Draw ==
=== Key ===
- Q = Qualifier
- WC = Wild card
- LL = Lucky loser
- Alt = Alternate
- SE = Special exempt
- PR = Protected ranking
- ITF = ITF entry
- JE = Junior exempt
- w/o = Walkover
- r = Retired
- d = Defaulted
- SR = Special ranking

=== Finals ===
Semifinals
1	(United States) Liezel Huber (United States) Lisa Raymond	6	6
(Czech Republic) Iveta Benešová (Czech Republic) Barbora Záhlavová-Strýcová	1	2
3	(Czech Republic) Andrea Hlaváčková (Czech Republic) Lucie Hradecká	7	5	[3]
2	(India) Sania Mirza (Russia) Elena Vesnina	5	7	[10]

Final
1	(United States) Liezel Huber (United States) Lisa Raymond	6	6
2	(India) Sania Mirza (Russia) Elena Vesnina	2	3

=== Top half ===
First round
1	(United States) L Huber (United States) L Raymond	6	7
(Russia) E Makarova (China) J Zheng	3	5
(New Zealand) M Erakovic (Romania) M Niculescu	4	7^{7}	[11]
(Belarus) O Govortsova (Australia) A Rodionova	6	6^{4}	[9]
(Russia) A Kudryavtseva (Germany) J Wöhr	5	0
(Australia) J Gajdošová (United States) B Mattek-Sands	7	6
(Japan) K Date-Krumm (China) S Zhang	3	4
7	(Spain) N Llagostera Vives (Spain) A Parra Santonja	6	6
4	(Russia) M Kirilenko (Russia) N Petrova	7^{7}	6
WC	(United States) J Hampton (United States) C McHale	6^{5}	4
(Chinese Taipei) S-w Hsieh (China) S Peng	4	5
(Czech Republic) I Benešová (Czech Republic) B Záhlavová-Strýcová	6	7
(Australia) C Dellacqua (Australia) S Stosur	6	6
(Slovenia) A Klepač (Poland) A Rosolska	2	0
(Chinese Taipei) C-j Chuang (Kazakhstan) G Voskoboeva	5	6	[9]
8	(Germany) A-L Grönefeld (United States) V King	7	3	[11]

Second round
1	(United States) L Huber (United States) L Raymond	5	7	[10]
(New Zealand) M Erakovic (Romania) M Niculescu	7	5	[3]
(Australia) J Gajdošová (United States) B Mattek-Sands	7	7
7	(Spain) N Llagostera Vives (Spain) A Parra Santonja	5	5
4	(Russia) M Kirilenko (Russia) N Petrova	3	4
(Czech Republic) I Benešová (Czech Republic) B Záhlavová-Strýcová	6	6
(Australia) C Dellacqua (Australia) S Stosur	w/o
8	(Germany) A-L Grönefeld (United States) V King

Quarterfinals
1	(United States) L Huber (United States) L Raymond	6	2	[10]
(Australia) J Gajdošová (United States) B Mattek-Sands	4	6	[5]
(Czech Republic) I Benešová (Czech Republic) B Záhlavová-Strýcová	3	6	[10]
(Australia) C Dellacqua (Australia) S Stosur	6	2	[7]

Semifinals
1	(United States) L Huber (United States) L Raymond	6	6
(Czech Republic) I Benešová (Czech Republic) B Záhlavová-Strýcová	1	2

=== Bottom half ===
First round
5	(Italy) S Errani (Italy) R Vinci	6	7
(Russia) N Bratchikova (Czech Republic) K Peschke	4	5
WC	(Belarus) V Azarenka (Czech Republic) P Kvitová	6	6
(South Africa) N Grandin (Czech Republic) V Uhlířová	2	2
(Germany) J Görges (Germany) S Lisicki	6	6^{2}	[10]
(United States) R Kops-Jones (United States) A Spears	2	7^{7}	[7]
(Poland) K Jans-Ignacik (France) K Mladenovic	3	3
3	(Czech Republic) A Hlaváčková (Czech Republic) L Hradecká	6	6
6	(Spain) A Medina Garrigues (Italy) F Pennetta	3	6	[7]
WC	(Argentina) G Dulko (Argentina) P Suárez	6	3	[10]
WC	(Greece) E Daniilidou (Serbia) J Janković	2	6	[7]
(Romania) I-C Begu (Spain) MJ Martínez Sánchez	6	2	[10]
(Russia) S Kuznetsova (Russia) V Zvonareva	1	4
(Switzerland) T Bacsinszky (Italy) A Brianti	6	6
(Russia) V Dushevina (Israel) S Pe'er	5	2
2	(India) S Mirza (Russia) E Vesnina	7	6

Second round
5	(Italy) S Errani (Italy) R Vinci	w/o
WC	(Belarus) V Azarenka (Czech Republic) P Kvitová
(Germany) J Görges (Germany) S Lisicki	2	4
3	(Czech Republic) A Hlaváčková (Czech Republic) L Hradecká	6	6
WC	(Argentina) G Dulko (Argentina) P Suárez	4
(Romania) I-C Begu (Spain) MJ Martínez Sánchez	3^{r}
(Switzerland) T Bacsinszky (Italy) A Brianti	1	6	[2]
2	(India) S Mirza (Russia) E Vesnina	6	3	[10]

Quarterfinals
5	(Italy) S Errani (Italy) R Vinci	2	6^{4}
3	(Czech Republic) A Hlaváčková (Czech Republic) L Hradecká	6	7^{7}
WC	(Argentina) G Dulko (Argentina) P Suárez	2	3
2	(India) S Mirza (Russia) E Vesnina	6	6

Semifinals
3	(Czech Republic) A Hlaváčková (Czech Republic) L Hradecká	7	5	[3]
2	(India) S Mirza (Russia) E Vesnina	5	7	[10]
