= 2009 Mutua Madrileña Madrid Open – Women's doubles =

Women's doubles
- 2009 Mutua Madrileña Madrid Open

Final
- Champions: (Zimbabwe) Cara Black (United States) Liezel Huber
- Runners-up: (Czech Republic) Květa Peschke (United States) Lisa Raymond
- Score: 4–6, 6–3, 10–6

Events
Singles	men	women
Doubles	men	women
← 2008 ·	Mutua Madrileña Madrid Open	· 2010 →

== Seeds ==
The top four seeds receive a bye into the second round.

1. (Zimbabwe) Cara Black / (United States) Liezel Huber (champions)
2. (Spain) Anabel Medina Garrigues / (Spain) Virginia Ruano Pascual (second round)
3. (Czech Republic) Květa Peschke / (United States) Lisa Raymond (final)
4. (Australia) Samantha Stosur / (Australia) Rennae Stubbs (semifinals)
5. (Spain) Nuria Llagostera Vives / (Spain) María José Martínez Sánchez (quarterfinals)
6. (Russia) Maria Kirilenko / (Italy) Flavia Pennetta (first round)
7. (Slovakia) Daniela Hantuchová / (Japan) Ai Sugiyama (quarterfinals)
8. (Germany) Anna-Lena Grönefeld / (Switzerland) Patty Schnyder (first round)

== Draw ==
=== Key ===
- Q = Qualifier
- WC = Wild card
- LL = Lucky loser
- Alt = Alternate
- SE = Special exempt
- PR = Protected ranking
- ITF = ITF entry
- JE = Junior exempt
- w/o = Walkover
- r = Retired
- d = Defaulted
- SR = Special ranking

=== Finals ===
Semifinals
1	(Zimbabwe) Cara Black (United States) Liezel Huber	7	7
4	(Australia) Samantha Stosur (Australia) Rennae Stubbs	5	6^{1}
3	(Czech Republic) Květa Peschke (United States) Lisa Raymond	7	6
(Chinese Taipei) Chuang Chia-Jung (India) Sania Mirza	6^{4}	4

Final
1	(Zimbabwe) Cara Black (United States) Liezel Huber	4	6	[10]
3	(Czech Republic) Květa Peschke (United States) Lisa Raymond	6	3	[6]

=== Top half ===
First round
(Russia) A Kleybanova (China) S Peng	4	1
(United States) B Mattek Sands (Russia) N Petrova	6	6
WC	(Spain) L Domínguez Lino (Spain) A Parra Santonja	0	2
WC	(Russia) D Safina (Hungary) Á Szávay	6	6
(United States) R Kops-Jones (United States) A Spears	6^{5}	2
5	(Spain) N Llagostera Vives (Spain) MJ Martínez Sánchez	7	6
(United States) V King (Romania) M Niculescu	6	7
(Russia) V Dushevina (Kazakhstan) G Voskoboeva	3	5
(Ukraine) A Bondarenko (Ukraine) K Bondarenko	3	6	[10]
ALT	(Uzbekistan) A Amanmuradova (Thailand) T Tanasugarn	6	1	[6]
(France) N Dechy (Italy) M Santangelo	4	3
7	(Slovakia) D Hantuchová (Japan) A Sugiyama	6	6

Second round
1	(Zimbabwe) C Black (United States) L Huber	3	6	[10]
(United States) B Mattek Sands (Russia) N Petrova	6	4	[4]
WC	(Russia) D Safina (Hungary) Á Szávay
5	(Spain) N Llagostera Vives (Spain) MJ Martínez Sánchez	w/o
4	(Australia) S Stosur (Australia) R Stubbs	6	6
(United States) V King (Romania) M Niculescu	0	2
(Ukraine) A Bondarenko (Ukraine) K Bondarenko	6	2	[1]
7	(Slovakia) D Hantuchová (Japan) A Sugiyama	0	6	[10]

Quarterfinals
1	(Zimbabwe) C Black (United States) L Huber	6	6
5	(Spain) N Llagostera Vives (Spain) MJ Martínez Sánchez	4	4
4	(Australia) S Stosur (Australia) R Stubbs	7	6
7	(Slovakia) D Hantuchová (Japan) A Sugiyama	5	4

Semifinals
1	(Zimbabwe) C Black (United States) L Huber	7	7
4	(Australia) S Stosur (Australia) R Stubbs	5	6^{1}

=== Bottom half ===
First round
6	(Russia) M Kirilenko (Italy) F Pennetta	3	r
(Chinese Taipei) S-w Hsieh (Slovakia) J Husárová	4
(China) Z Yan (China) J Zheng	2	0
(Poland) K Jans (Poland) A Rosolska	6	6
(Argentina) G Dulko (Israel) S Pe'er	3	6	[10]
(United States) J Craybas (Italy) F Schiavone	6	3	[6]
8	(Germany) A-L Grönefeld (Switzerland) P Schnyder	2	6^{3}
(Belarus) V Azarenka (Russia) E Vesnina	6	7
(Russia) A Kudryavtseva (Russia) E Makarova	2	7	[10]
(Romania) S Cîrstea (Czech Republic) V Uhlířová	6	6^{2}	[3]
(Chinese Taipei) C-j Chuang (India) S Mirza	6	6
WC	(Argentina) ME Salerni (Spain) S Soler Espinosa	3	4

Second round
(Chinese Taipei) S-w Hsieh (Slovakia) J Husárová	6	3	[10]
(Poland) K Jans (Poland) A Rosolska	3	6	[6]
(Argentina) G Dulko (Israel) S Pe'er
3	(Czech Republic) K Peschke (United States) L Raymond	w/o
(Belarus) V Azarenka (Russia) E Vesnina	6	6
(Russia) A Kudryavtseva (Russia) E Makarova	1	1
(Chinese Taipei) C-j Chuang (India) S Mirza	7	4	[10]
2	(Spain) A Medina Garrigues (Spain) V Ruano Pascual	6^{4}	6	[7]

Quarterfinals
(Chinese Taipei) S-w Hsieh (Slovakia) J Husárová	3	0
3	(Czech Republic) K Peschke (United States) L Raymond	6	6
(Belarus) V Azarenka (Russia) E Vesnina	0	r
(Chinese Taipei) C-j Chuang (India) S Mirza	2

Semifinals
3	(Czech Republic) K Peschke (United States) L Raymond	7	6
(Chinese Taipei) C-j Chuang (India) S Mirza	6^{4}	4
