= 2008 Pacific Life Open – Women's singles =

Women's singles
- 2008 Pacific Life Open

Final
- Champion: (Serbia) Ana Ivanovic
- Runner-up: (Russia) Svetlana Kuznetsova
- Score: 6–4, 6–3

Details
- Draw: 96
- Seeds: 32

Events
Singles	men	women
Doubles	men	women
- Pacific Life Open

Ana Ivanovic defeated Svetlana Kuznetsova in the final, 6–4, 6–3 to win the women's singles tennis title at the 2008 Indian Wells Masters.

Daniela Hantuchová was the defending champion, but was defeated in the quarterfinals by Maria Sharapova.

== Seeds ==
All seeds receive a bye into the second round.

1. (Serbia) Ana Ivanovic (champion)
2. (Russia) Svetlana Kuznetsova (final)
3. (Serbia) Jelena Janković (semifinals)
4. (Russia) Maria Sharapova (semifinals)
5. (Slovakia) Daniela Hantuchová (quarterfinals)
6. (France) Marion Bartoli (fourth round)
7. (Czech Republic) Nicole Vaidišová (second round)
8. (Russia) Dinara Safina (third round)
9. (Israel) Shahar Pe'er (third round)
10. (Poland) Agnieszka Radwańska (quarterfinals)
11. (Austria) Sybille Bammer (second round)
12. (Russia) Vera Zvonareva (quarterfinals)
13. (Italy) Francesca Schiavone (fourth round)
14. (China) Li Na (withdrew due to a right knee injury)
15. (Ukraine) Alona Bondarenko (fourth round)
16. (France) Virginie Razzano (second round)
17. (France) Amélie Mauresmo (third round)
18. (Russia) Maria Kirilenko (second round)
19. (Italy) Flavia Pennetta (third round)
20. (Spain) Anabel Medina Garrigues (fourth round)
21. (India) Sania Mirza (fourth round)
22. (Netherlands) Michaëlla Krajicek (second round)
23. (Italy) Karin Knapp (second round)
24. (United States) Lindsay Davenport (quarterfinals, retired due to a low back injury)
25. (Greece) Eleni Daniilidou (third round)
26. (Czech Republic) Lucie Šafářová (second round)
27. (Japan) Ai Sugiyama (third round)
28. (Slovakia) Dominika Cibulková (third round)
29. (Belarus) Olga Govortsova (second round)
30. (Ukraine) Kateryna Bondarenko (second round)
31. (Italy) Tathiana Garbin (third round)
32. (Austria) Tamira Paszek (third round, retired due to a gastro intestinal illness)

== Draw ==
Key

- Q = Qualifier
- WC = Wild card
- LL = Lucky loser
- Alt = Alternate
- ITF = ITF entry
- PR = Protected ranking
- SR = Special ranking
- SE = Special exempt
- JE = Junior exempt
- JR = Junior Accelerator Programme entrant
- CO = College Accelerator Programme entrant
- NG = Next Gen Accelerator Program entrant
- w/o = Walkover
- r = Retired
- d = Defaulted

=== Finals ===
Quarterfinals
1	(Serbia) Ana Ivanovic	6	6
12	(Russia) Vera Zvonareva	1	4
3	(Serbia) Jelena Janković	6	0
24	(United States) Lindsay Davenport	2	0^{r}
5	(Slovakia) Daniela Hantuchová	6^{2}	1
4	(Russia) Maria Sharapova	7^{7}	6
10	(Poland) Agnieszka Radwańska	2	4
2	(Russia) Svetlana Kuznetsova	6	6

Semifinals
1	(Serbia) Ana Ivanovic	7^{7}	6
3	(Serbia) Jelena Janković	6^{3}	3
4	(Russia) Maria Sharapova	3	7	2
2	(Russia) Svetlana Kuznetsova	6	5	6

Final
1	(Serbia) Ana Ivanovic	6	6
2	(Russia) Svetlana Kuznetsova	4	3

=== Top half ===
==== Section 1 ====
First round
(Romania) IR Olaru	6	6
(China) M Yuan	4	4
WC	(United States) V King	4	6	6
(Luxembourg) A Kremer	6	3	4
(Estonia) K Kanepi	6	6
(Germany) M Müller	3	2
(Estonia) M Ani	5	2
WC	(United States) M Oudin	7	6

Second round
1	(Serbia) A Ivanovic	6	5	6
(Romania) IR Olaru	1	7	0
WC	(United States) V King	3	3
31	(Italy) T Garbin	6	6
19	(Italy) F Pennetta	6	6
(Estonia) K Kanepi	2	1
WC	(United States) M Oudin	1	1
13	(Italy) F Schiavone	6	6

Third round
1	(Serbia) A Ivanovic	6	6
31	(Italy) T Garbin	3	0
19	(Italy) F Pennetta	3	4
13	(Italy) F Schiavone	6	6

Fourth round
1	(Serbia) A Ivanovic	2	7	6
13	(Italy) F Schiavone	6	5	2

==== Section 2 ====
First round
(France) C Pin	5	2
(France) A Rezaï	7	6
Q	(Russia) G Voskoboeva	7	6
(France) P Parmentier	5	3
Q	(Germany) J Schruff	7	6
Q	(Colombia) C Castaño	6^{2}	3
(Russia) O Poutchkova	1	1
(Australia) C Dellacqua	6	6

Second round
12	(Russia) V Zvonareva	6	3	6
(France) A Rezaï	3	6	3
Q	(Russia) G Voskoboeva	6	6
22	(Netherlands) M Krajicek	3	3
32	(Austria) T Paszek	4	6	6
Q	(Germany) J Schruff	6	2	2
(Australia) C Dellacqua	6	3	6
7	(Czech Republic) N Vaidišová	1	6	4

Third round
12	(Russia) V Zvonareva	6	6
Q	(Russia) G Voskoboeva	0	3
32	(Austria) T Paszek	1	0	r
(Australia) C Dellacqua	6	4

Fourth round
12	(Russia) V Zvonareva	6^{5}	6	6
(Australia) C Dellacqua	7	0	4

==== Section 3 ====
First round
WC	(United States) M Brengle	2	2
WC	(United States) A Rolle	6	6
Q	(Germany) S Lisicki	3	6	4
Q	(Hungary) G Arn	6	0	6
Q	(Russia) A Kudryavtseva	6	6
WC	(United States) B Mattek	2	1
WC	(Russia) A Pivovarova	4	3
Q	(Russia) E Rodina	6	6

Second round
3	(Serbia) J Janković	6	6
WC	(United States) A Rolle	0	2
Q	(Hungary) G Arn	6	3	1
27	(Japan) A Sugiyama	2	6	6
20	(Spain) A Medina Garrigues	6	6
Q	(Russia) A Kudryavtseva	2	4
Q	(Russia) E Rodina	6	6^{2}	6
16	(France) V Razzano	0	7	2

Third round
3	(Serbia) J Janković	6	6
27	(Japan) A Sugiyama	1	1
20	(Spain) A Medina Garrigues	6	7
Q	(Russia) E Rodina	3	5

Fourth round
3	(Serbia) J Janković	6	6
20	(Spain) A Medina Garrigues	3	3

==== Section 4 ====
First round
Q	(Czech Republic) I Benešová	6	2	4
(Chinese Taipei) Y-j Chan	2	6	6
(Argentina) G Dulko	0	6	6
LL	(United States) J Ditty	6	3	3
(Russia) E Bychkova	1	2
(Germany) A Kerber	6	6
(Russia) E Vesnina	6	4	6
(Chinese Taipei) S-w Hsieh	4	6	4

Second round
11	(Austria) S Bammer	1	3
(Chinese Taipei) Y-j Chan	6	6
(Argentina) G Dulko	2	0	r
24	(United States) L Davenport	6	0
29	(Belarus) O Govortsova	5	2
(Germany) A Kerber	7	6
(Russia) E Vesnina	0	4
6	(France) M Bartoli	6	6

Third round
(Chinese Taipei) Y-j Chan	4	7	2
24	(United States) L Davenport	6	5	6
(Germany) A Kerber	3	6^{3}
6	(France) M Bartoli	6	7

Fourth round
24	(United States) L Davenport	6	7
6	(France) M Bartoli	2	5

=== Bottom half ===
==== Section 5 ====
First round
WC	(United States) A Haynes	7	6
(Italy) S Errani	5	2
PR	(China) J Zheng	6	6
(France) É Loit	0	1
(Ukraine) O Savchuk	2	6	7
(Russia) Y Shvedova	6	4	6^{4}
(Russia) A Rodionova	4	3
(Uzbekistan) A Amanmuradova	6	6

Second round
5	(Slovakia) D Hantuchová	6	6
WC	(United States) A Haynes	1	2
PR	(China) J Zheng	6	6
30	(Ukraine) K Bondarenko	2	4
21	(India) S Mirza	4	6	6
(Ukraine) O Savchuk	6	1	4
(Uzbekistan) A Amanmuradova	1	4
9	(Israel) S Pe'er	6	6

Third round
5	(Slovakia) D Hantuchová	6	6
PR	(China) J Zheng	4	2
21	(India) S Mirza	6^{7}	7	6
9	(Israel) S Pe'er	7	5	3

Fourth round
5	(Slovakia) D Hantuchová	6	7
21	(India) S Mirza	1	6^{4}

==== Section 6 ====
First round
(Poland) M Domachowska	4	2
(Bulgaria) T Pironkova	6	6
(Austria) Y Meusburger	4	6	1
(Romania) E Gallovits	6	2	6
(Czech Republic) K Zakopalová	6	6
(Argentina) ME Salerni	4	4
Q	(France) S Cohen-Aloro	6	6
(United States) L Osterloh	1	2

Second round
15	(Ukraine) A Bondarenko	6	7
(Bulgaria) T Pironkova	3	6^{2}
(Romania) E Gallovits	2	4
17	(France) A Mauresmo	6	6
25	(Greece) E Daniilidou	1	7	6
(Czech Republic) K Zakopalová	6	6^{1}	2
Q	(France) S Cohen-Aloro	1	0
4	(Russia) M Sharapova	6	6

Third round
15	(Ukraine) A Bondarenko	6	6
17	(France) A Mauresmo	1	2
25	(Greece) E Daniilidou	5	3
4	(Russia) M Sharapova	7	6

Fourth round
15	(Ukraine) A Bondarenko	2	7	4
4	(Russia) M Sharapova	6	5	6

==== Section 7 ====
First round
(United States) J Craybas	7	6
Q	(Czech Republic) B Záhlavová-Strýcová	6^{2}	4
(Ukraine) T Perebiynis	2	0
(United States) A Harkleroad	6	6
(China) S Peng	6	6
(Germany) T Malek	4	3
(France) N Dechy	1	4
(Ukraine) M Koryttseva	6	6

Second round
8	(Russia) D Safina	7	7
(United States) J Craybas	6^{3}	5
(United States) A Harkleroad	7	2	6
26	(Czech Republic) L Šafářová	6^{2}	6	4
23	(Italy) K Knapp	1	3
(China) S Peng	6	6
(Ukraine) M Koryttseva	1	6^{3}
10	(Poland) A Radwańska	6	7

Third round
8	(Russia) D Safina	5	2
(United States) A Harkleroad	7	6
(China) S Peng	3	6	3
10	(Poland) A Radwańska	6	3	6

Fourth round
(United States) A Harkleroad	6	2	4
10	(Poland) A Radwańska	4	6	6

==== Section 8 ====
First round
(China) Z Yan	2	6	6
WC	(Poland) U Radwańska	6	0	2
Q	(Hungary) M Czink	2	6^{4}
(Denmark) C Wozniacki	6	7
Q	(Czech Republic) R Voráčová	6	3	3
(Sweden) S Arvidsson	3	6	6
(Russia) E Makarova	6	6
(United States) M Tu	4	2

Second round
LL	(Japan) A Nakamura	6	0	6
(China) Z Yan	2	6	4
(Denmark) C Wozniacki	6	6
18	(Russia) M Kirilenko	2	0
28	(Slovakia) D Cibulková	7	6
(Sweden) S Arvidsson	5	4
(Russia) E Makarova	1	1
2	(Russia) S Kuznetsova	6	6

Third round
LL	(Japan) A Nakamura	0	2
(Denmark) C Wozniacki	6	6
28	(Slovakia) D Cibulková	1	6	3
2	(Russia) S Kuznetsova	6	4	6

Fourth round
(Denmark) C Wozniacki	2	3
2	(Russia) S Kuznetsova	6	6
