= Peng Shuai career statistics =

Statistics of Chinese tennis player

Career finals
Discipline	Type	Won	Lost	Total	WR (Note: Winning rate)
Singles	Grand Slam	–	–	–	–
Singles	Summer Olympics	–	–	–	–
Singles	WTA Finals (Note: Formerly known as: Virginia Slims Championships (until 1995); WTA Tour Championships (until 2014))	–	–	–	–
Singles	WTA Elite (Note: Elite tier: WTA Tournament of Champions (2009–14); WTA Elite Trophy (2015–present))	–	–	–	–
Singles	WTA 1000 (Note: Formerly known as: Category 4 & 5 & 6 (until 1990); Tier I (until 2009); WTA Premier Mandatory and 5 (until 2021))	–	–	–	–
Singles	WTA 500 (Note: Formerly known as: Category 3 (until 1990); Tier II (until 2009); WTA Premier (until 2021))	0	2	2	0.00
Singles	WTA 250 (Note: Formerly known as: Category 1 & 2 (until 1990); Tier III & IV & V (until 2009); WTA International (until 2021))	2	5	7	0.29
Singles	Total	2	7	9	0.22
Doubles	Grand Slam	2	1	3	0.67
Doubles	Summer Olympics	–	–	–	–
Doubles	WTA Finals	1	1	2	0.50
Doubles	WTA Elite	–	–	–	–
Doubles	WTA 1000	8	3	11	0.73
Doubles	WTA 500	2	1	3	0.67
Doubles	WTA 250	10	3	13	0.77
Doubles	Total	23	9	32	0.72
Total		25	16	41	0.61

This is a list of the main career statistics of professional Chinese tennis player Peng Shuai.

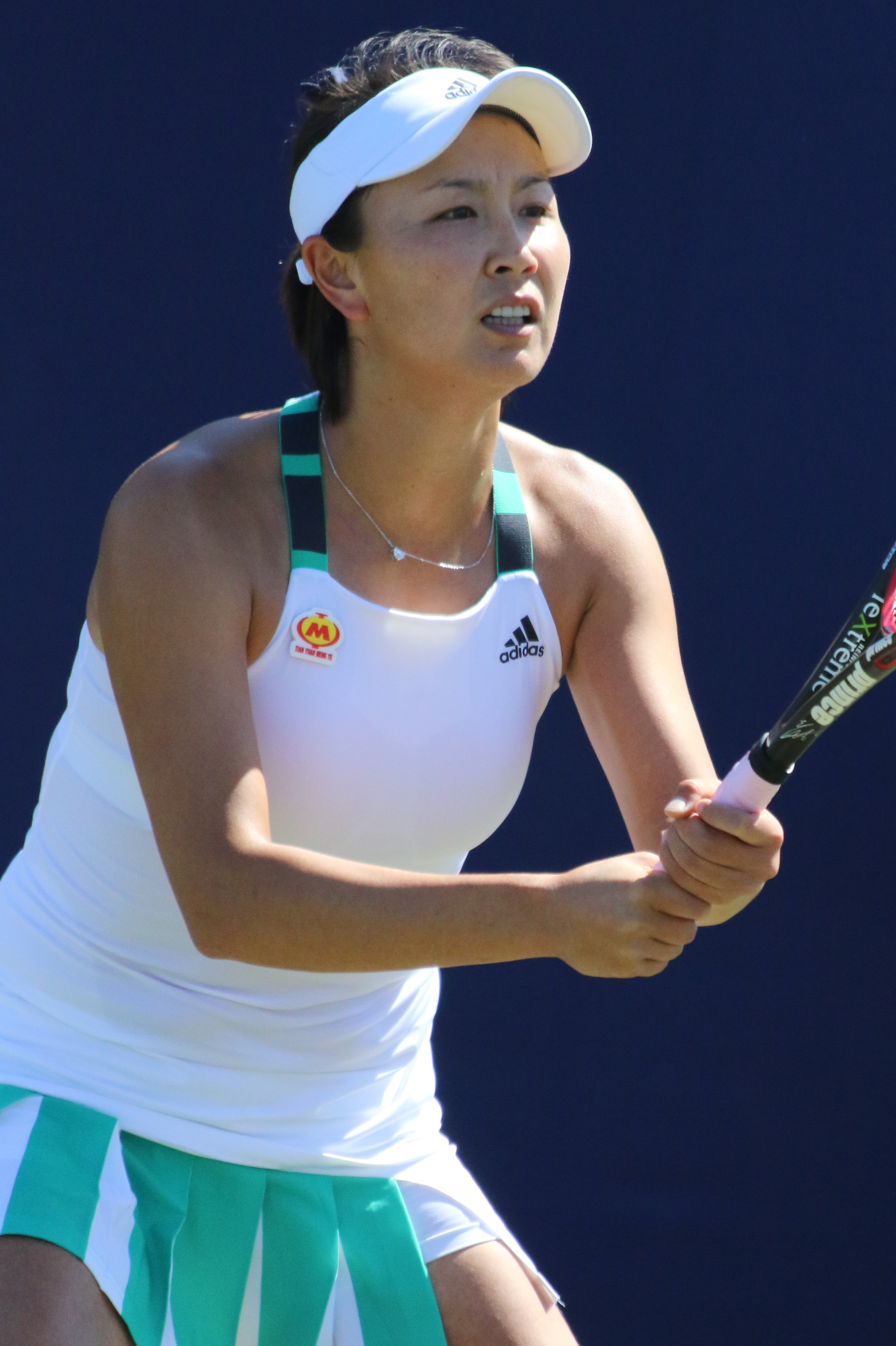
Peng in 2017

== Performance timelines ==
Key
W	F	SF	QF	#R	RR	Q#	P#	DNQ	A	Z#	PO	G	S	B	NMS	NTI	P	NH

(W) winner; (F) finalist; (SF) semifinalist; (QF) quarterfinalist; (#R) rounds 4, 3, 2, 1; (RR) round-robin stage; (Q#) qualification round; (P#) preliminary round; (DNQ) did not qualify; (A) absent; (Z#) Davis/Fed Cup Zonal Group (with number indication) or (PO) play-off; (G) gold, (S) silver or (B) bronze Olympic/Paralympic medal; (NMS) not a Masters tournament; (NTI) not a Tier I tournament; (P) postponed; (NH) not held; (SR) strike rate (events won / competed); (W–L) win–loss record.
To avoid confusion and double counting, these charts are updated at the conclusion of a tournament or when the player's participation has ended.

Only main-draw results in WTA Tour, Grand Slam tournaments, Billie Jean King Cup (Fed Cup), Hopman Cup and Olympic Games are included in win–loss records.

=== Singles ===
Tournament	2001	2002	2003	2004	2005	2006	2007	2008	2009	2010	2011	2012	2013	2014	2015	2016	2017	2018	2019	2020	SR	W–L	Win %
Grand Slam tournaments
Australian Open	A	A	A	A	2R	1R	2R	1R	3R	1R	4R	2R	2R	1R	4R	A	2R	1R	1R	1R	0 / 15	13–15	46%
French Open	A	A	A	Q3	2R	2R	A	2R	1R	A	3R	3R	2R	1R	1R	A	1R	2R	Q1	A	0 / 11	9–11	45%
Wimbledon	A	A	A	1R	A	3R	1R	3R	2R	A	4R	4R	2R	4R	A	1R	3R	1R	Q1	NH	0 / 12	17–12	59%
US Open	A	A	A	Q1	1R	1R	1R	2R	2R	3R	4R	1R	2R	SF	A	1R	2R	A	2R	A	0 / 13	15–13	54%
Win–loss	0–0	0–0	0–0	0–1	2–3	3–4	1–3	4–4	4–4	2–2	11–4	6–4	4–4	8–4	3–2	0–2	4–4	1–3	1–2	0–1	0 / 51	54–51	51%
National representation
Summer Olympics	not held			A	not held			2R	not held			2R	not held			1R	not held				0 / 3	2–3	40%
Year-end championship
WTA Elite Trophy	not held								DNQ		1R	DNQ					RR	DNQ		NH	0 / 2	1–2	33%
WTA 1000 + former^{†} tournaments
Dubai / Qatar Open (Note: The first Premier 5 event of the year has switched back and forth between the Dubai Tennis Championships and the Qatar Total Open since 2009. Dubai was classified as a Premier 5 event from 2009 to 2011 before being succeeded by Doha for the 2012–2014 period. In 2015, Dubai regained its Premier 5 status while Doha was demoted to Premier status. The Premier 5 tournaments were reclassified as WTA 1000 tournaments in 2021.)	not Tier I							1R	1R	A	2R	2R	A	2R	2R	A	3R	1R	A	Q1	0 / 8	6–8	43%
Indian Wells Open	A	A	1R	A	A	1R	3R	3R	3R	3R	QF	2R	3R	2R	A	1R	4R	A	A	NH	0 / 12	15–12	56%
Miami Open	A	A	1R	A	A	2R	2R	2R	3R	2R	4R	3R	2R	2R	A	2R	3R	A	A	NH	0 / 12	14–12	54%
Berlin / Madrid Open (Note: In 2009, the Berlin Open was replaced by the Madrid Open. The Premier Mandatory tournaments were reclassified as WTA 1000 tournaments in 2021.)	A	A	A	A	3R	A	3R	2R	2R	2R	1R	1R	1R	2R	1R	A	1R	1R	A	NH	0 / 12	8–12	25%
Italian Open	A	A	A	A	1R	2R (Note: Withdraw during the tournament. Not counted as a loss.)	A	1R	1R	A	1R	1R	2R	1R	A	A	1R	1R	A	A	0 / 10	2–9	17%
Canadian Open	A	A	A	A	A	A	3R	A	1R	A	2R	2R	A	Q1	A	A	1R	A	Q1	NH	0 / 5	4–4	57%
Cincinnati Open	not held			not Tier I					3R	A	QF	3R	1R	A	A	A	1R	A	A	A	0 / 5	7–4	58%
Pan Pacific / Wuhan Open (Note: In 2014, the Toray Pan Pacific Open was downgraded to a Premier event and replaced by the Wuhan Open. The Premier 5 tournaments were reclassified as WTA 1000 tournaments in 2021.)	A	A	A	A	1R	A	Q1	A	2R	Q1	3R	1R	2R	1R	A	1R	2R	A	1R	NH	0 / 9	5–9	36%
China Open	not held			Tier II					QF	1R	1R	3R	1R	2R	A	2R	3R	A	1R	NH	0 / 9	9–9	50%
Charleston Open^{†}	A	A	A	A	2R	1R	3R	A	Premier												0 / 3	3–3	50%
Southern California Open^{†}	not Tier I			A	SF	2R	1R	not held		Premier				not held							0 / 3	5–3	63%
Zurich Open^{†}	A	A	A	A	A	A	1R	NT1	not held												0 / 1	0–1	0%
Win–loss	0–0	0–0	0–2	0–0	7–5	3–4	8–7	4–5	9–9	4–4	14–7	7–9	4–7	5–7	1–2	2–4	10–9	0–3	0–2	0–0	0 / 89	78–86	48%
Career statistics
	2001	2002	2003	2004	2005	2006	2007	2008	2009	2010	2011	2012	2013	2014	2015	2016	2017	2018	2019	2020	SR	W–L	Win %
Tournaments	1	1	2	4	16	17	17	23	22	13	23	23	18	22	7	12	24	9	9	3	Career total: 276		
Titles	0	0	0	0	0	0	0	0	0	0	0	0	0	0	0	1	1	0	0	0	Career total: 2		
Finals	0	0	0	0	0	1	0	2	0	0	1	0	1	1	0	1	2	0	0	0	Career total: 9		
Overall win–loss	0–1	0–1	0–2	5–4	20–16	20–16	19–18	26–25	24–23	15–12	48–21	22–23	18–18	27–21	6–7	6–11	35–23	1–9	7–9	2–3	2 / 276	301–263	53%
Year-end ranking	516	359	326	73	37	56	46	40	47	72	17	40	45	21	872	44	27	298	75	117	$9,617,653		

=== Doubles ===
Tournament	2001	2002	2003	2004	2005	2006	2007	2008	2009	2010	2011	2012	2013	2014	2015	2016	2017	2018	2019	2020	2021	SR	W–L
Grand Slam tournaments
Australian Open	A	A	A	A	3R	2R	2R	2R	QF	3R	3R	1R	3R	2R	1R	1R	F	SF	1R	1R	A	0 / 16	24–16
French Open	A	A	A	A	1R	2R	A	3R	SF	A	2R	3R	2R	W	A	A	3R	1R	1R	A	A	1 / 11	19–10
Wimbledon	A	A	A	A	A	2R	QF	1R	1R	A	QF	1R	W	3R	A	2R	A	2R	1R	NH	A	1 / 11	18–10
US Open	A	A	A	QF	2R	1R	2R	3R	2R	2R	1R	QF	QF	3R	A	A	SF	A	2R	A	A	0 / 13	22–13
Win–loss	0–0	0–0	0–0	3–1	3–3	3–4	5–3	5–4	8–4	3–2	6–4	5–4	12–3	11–3	0–1	1–2	12–4	4–1	1–4	0–1	0–0	2 / 51	83–49
National representation
Summer Olympics	not held			A	not held			1R	not held			QF	not held			2R	not held				A	0 / 3	3–3
Year-end championship
WTA Finals	did not qualify												W	F	did not qualify					NH	DNQ	1 / 2	4–1
WTA 1000 + former^{†} tournaments
Dubai / Qatar Open	Tier II							1R	A	A	2R	1R	A	W	2R	A	F	1R	A	2R	A	1 / 7	10–7
Indian Wells Open	A	A	A	A	A	1R	1R	1R	2R	1R	1R	1R	SF	W	A	1R	2R	A	A	NH	A	1 / 11	10–10
Miami Open	A	A	A	A	A	A	A	QF	1R	QF	SF	1R	2R	1R	A	2R	SF	A	A	NH	A	0 / 9	12–9
Berlin / Madrid Open	A	A	A	A	QF	A	1R	QF	1R	1R	2R	1R	1R	SF	1R	A	1R	1R	A	NH	A	0 / 11	7–11
Italian Open	A	A	A	A	2R	A	A	SF	W	A	W	A	W	2R	A	A	A	1R	A	A	A	3 / 7	19–4
Canadian Open	A	A	A	A	A	A	QF	A	2R	A	A	QF	A	SF	A	A	QF	A	1R	NH	A	0 / 6	8–6
Cincinnati Open	not held			Tier III					2R	A	A	QF	W	2R	A	A	SF	A	A	A	A	1 / 5	8–4
Pan Pacific / Wuhan Open	A	A	A	A	1R	A	A	A	A	F	A	1R	SF	SF	A	SF	SF	A	1R	NH		0 / 8	12–8
China Open	not held			Tier II					W	2R	QF	2R	SF	W	A	QF	QF	A	2R	NH		2 / 9	21–7
Charleston Open^{†}	A	A	A	A	1R	2R	F	A	Premier													0 / 3	4–2
Southern California Open^{†}	Tier II			A	QF	A	QF	not held		Premier				not held								0 / 2	4–2
Zurich Open^{†}	A	A	A	A	A	A	SF	T II	not held													0 / 1	2–1
Career statistics
Tournaments	1	ITF Only		5	15	10	16	19	18	12	13	16	15	16	4	13	14	9	13	6	0	Career total: 196	
Titles	0	ITF Only		0	0	0	1	2	3	0	1	0	5	5	0	3	1	0	2	0	0	Career total: 23	
Finals	0	ITF Only		0	0	0	2	2	3	2	1	0	5	6	0	3	3	1	3	1	0	Career total: 32	
Overall win–loss	0–1	ITF Only		5–5	13–14	7–6	23–14	23–17	31–14	18–11	20–12	15–15	35–10	37–11	0–4	20–10	31–12	10–9	18–11	5–6	0–0	282–159	
Year-end ranking	660	—N/a	—N/a	85	61	105	20	27	12	39	25	56	4	3	872	44	9	63	49	58		$9,617,653	

== Significant finals ==
=== Grand Slams ===
==== Doubles: 3 (2 titles, 1 runner-up) ====
Result	Year	Championship	Surface	Partner	Opponents	Score
Win	2013	Wimbledon	Grass	(Chinese Taipei) Hsieh Su-wei	(Australia) Ashleigh Barty (Australia) Casey Dellacqua	7–6^{(7–1)}, 6–1
Win	2014	French Open	Clay	(Chinese Taipei) Hsieh Su-wei	(Italy) Sara Errani (Italy) Roberta Vinci	6–4, 6–1
Loss	2017	Australian Open	Hard	(Czech Republic) Andrea Hlaváčková	(United States) Bethanie Mattek-Sands (Czech Republic) Lucie Šafářová	7–6^{(7–4)}, 3–6, 3–6

=== WTA Finals ===
==== Doubles: 2 (1 title, 1 runner-up) ====
Result	Year	Championship	Surface	Partner	Opponents	Score
Win	2013	WTA Finals, Istanbul	Hard (i)	(Chinese Taipei) Hsieh Su-wei	(Russia) Ekaterina Makarova (Russia) Elena Vesnina	6–4, 7–5
Loss	2014	WTA Finals, Singapore	Hard (i)	(Chinese Taipei) Hsieh Su-wei	(Zimbabwe) Cara Black (India) Sania Mirza	1–6, 0–6

=== WTA 1000 ===
==== Doubles: 11 (8 titles, 3 runner-ups) ====
Result	Year	Tournament	Surface	Partner	Opponents	Score
Loss	2007	Charleston Open	Clay (green)	(China) Sun Tiantian	(China) Yan Zi (China) Zheng Jie	5–7, 0–6
Win	2009	Italian Open	Clay	(Chinese Taipei) Hsieh Su-wei	(Slovakia) Daniela Hantuchová (Japan) Ai Sugiyama	7–5, 7–6^{(7–5)}
Win	2009	China Open	Hard	(Chinese Taipei) Hsieh Su-wei	(Russia) Alla Kudryavtseva (Russia) Ekaterina Makarova	6–3, 6–1
Loss	2010	Pan Pacific Open	Hard (i)	(Israel) Shahar Pe'er	(Czech Republic) Iveta Benešová (Czech Republic) Barbora Záhlavová-Strýcová	4–6, 6–4, [8–10]
Win	2011	Italian Open	Clay	(China) Zheng Jie	(United States) Vania King (Kazakhstan) Yaroslava Shvedova	6–2, 6–3
Win	2013	Italian Open	Clay	(Chinese Taipei) Hsieh Su-wei	(Italy) Sara Errani (Italy) Roberta Vinci	4–6, 6–3, [10–8]
Win	2013	Cincinnati Open	Hard	(Chinese Taipei) Hsieh Su-wei	(Germany) Anna-Lena Grönefeld (Czech Republic) Květa Peschke	2–6, 6–3, [12–10]
Win	2014	Qatar Open	Hard	(Chinese Taipei) Hsieh Su-wei	(Czech Republic) Květa Peschke (Slovenia) Katarina Srebotnik	6–4, 6–0
Win	2014	Indian Wells Open	Hard	(Chinese Taipei) Hsieh Su-wei	(Zimbabwe) Cara Black (India) Sania Mirza	7–6^{(7–5)}, 6–2
Win	2014	China Open	Hard	(Czech Republic) Andrea Hlaváčková	(Zimbabwe) Cara Black (India) Sania Mirza	6–4, 6–4
Loss	2017	Dubai Championships	Hard	(Czech Republic) Andrea Hlaváčková	(Russia) Ekaterina Makarova (Russia) Elena Vesnina	2–6, 6–4, [7–10]

== WTA Tour finals ==
=== Singles: 9 (2 titles, 7 runner-ups) ===
Legend
WTA 500 (Premier) (0–2)
WTA 250 (Tier III / Tier IV / International) (2–5)

Result	W–L	Date	Tournament	Tier	Surface	Opponent	Score
Loss	0–1	May 2006	Internationaux de Strasbourg, France	Tier III	Clay	(Czech Republic) Nicole Vaidišová	6–7^{(7–9)}, 3–6
Loss	0–2	Aug 2008	Forest Hills Classic, United States	Tier IV	Hard	(Czech Republic) Lucie Šafářová	4–6, 2–6
Loss	0–3	Sep 2008	Guangzhou Open, China	Tier III	Hard	(Russia) Vera Zvonareva	7–6^{(7–5)}, 0–6, 2–6
Loss	0–4	May 2011	Brussels Open, Belgium	Premier	Clay	(Denmark) Caroline Wozniacki	6–2, 3–6, 3–6
Loss	0–5	May 2013	Brussels Open, Belgium (2)	Premier	Clay	(Estonia) Kaia Kanepi	2–6, 5–7
Loss	0–6	Jan 2014	Shenzhen Open, China	International	Hard	(China) Li Na	4–6, 5–7
Win	1–6	Oct 2016	Tianjin Open, China	International	Hard	(United States) Alison Riske	7–6^{(7–3)}, 6–2
Loss	1–7	Feb 2017	Taipei Open, Taiwan	International	Hard (i)	(Ukraine) Elina Svitolina	3–6, 2–6
Win	2–7	Jul 2017	Jiangxi Open, China	International	Hard	(Japan) Nao Hibino	6–3, 6–2

=== Doubles: 32 (23 titles, 9 runner-ups) ===
Legend
Grand Slam tournaments (2–1)
Finals (1–1)
WTA 1000 (Tier I / Premier 5 / Premier M) (8–3)
WTA 500 (Tier II / Premier) (2–1)
WTA 250 (Tier III / International) (10–3)

Result	W–L	Date	Tournament	Tier	Surface	Partner	Opponents	Score
Loss	0–1	Apr 2007	Charleston Open, United States	Tier I	Clay (green)	(China) Sun Tiantian	(China) Yan Zi (China) Zheng Jie	5–7, 0–6
Win	1–1	Sep 2007	Guangzhou Open, China	Tier III	Hard	(China) Yan Zi	(United States) Vania King (China) Sun Tiantian	6–3, 6–4
Win	2–1	Mar 2008	Bangalore Open, India	Tier II	Hard	(China) Sun Tiantian	(Chinese Taipei) Chan Yung-jan (Chinese Taipei) Chuang Chia-jung	6–4, 5–7, [10–8]
Win	3–1	Sep 2008	Wismilak International, Indonesia	Tier III	Hard	(Chinese Taipei) Hsieh Su-wei	(Poland) Marta Domachowska (Russia) Nadia Petrova	6–7^{(4–7)}, 7–6^{(6–3)}, [10–7]
Win	4–1	Jan 2009	Sydney International, Australia	Premier	Hard	(Chinese Taipei) Hsieh Su-wei	(France) Nathalie Dechy (Australia) Casey Dellacqua	6–0, 6–1
Win	5–1	May 2009	Italian Open	Premier 5	Clay	(Chinese Taipei) Hsieh Su-wei	(Slovakia) Daniela Hantuchová (Japan) Ai Sugiyama	7–5, 7–6^{(7–5)}
Win	6–1	Oct 2009	China Open	Premier M	Hard	(Chinese Taipei) Hsieh Su-wei	(Russia) Alla Kudryavtseva (Russia) Ekaterina Makarova	6–3, 6–1
Loss	6–2	Apr 2010	Amelia Island Championships, U.S.	International	Clay (green)	(Chinese Taipei) Chuang Chia-jung	(United States) Bethanie Mattek-Sands (China) Yan Zi	6–4, 4–6, [8–10]
Loss	6–3	Oct 2010	Pan Pacific Open, Japan	Premier 5	Hard (i)	(Israel) Shahar Pe'er	(Czech Republic) Iveta Benešová (Czech Republic) Barbora Záhlavová-Strýcová	4–6, 6–4, [8–10]
Win	7–3	May 2011	Italian Open (2)	Premier 5	Clay	(China) Zheng Jie	(United States) Vania King (Kazakhstan) Yaroslava Shvedova	6–2, 6–3
Win	8–3	May 2013	Italian Open (3)	Premier 5	Clay	(Chinese Taipei) Hsieh Su-wei	(Italy) Sara Errani (Italy) Roberta Vinci	4–6, 6–3, [10–8]
Win	9–3	July 2013	Wimbledon, United Kingdom	Grand Slam	Grass	(Chinese Taipei) Hsieh Su-wei	(Australia) Ashleigh Barty (Australia) Casey Dellacqua	7–6^{(7–1)}, 6–1
Win	10–3	Aug 2013	Cincinnati Open, United States	Premier 5	Hard	(Chinese Taipei) Hsieh Su-wei	(Germany) Anna-Lena Grönefeld (Czech Republic) Květa Peschke	2–6, 6–3, [12–10]
Win	11–3	Sep 2013	Guangzhou Open, China (2)	International	Hard	(Chinese Taipei) Hsieh Su-wei	(United States) Vania King (Kazakhstan) Galina Voskoboeva	6–3, 4–6, [12–10]
Win	12–3	Oct 2013	WTA Finals, Istanbul	Finals	Hard (i)	(Chinese Taipei) Hsieh Su-wei	(Russia) Ekaterina Makarova (Russia) Elena Vesnina	6–4, 7–5
Win	13–3	Feb 2014	Pattaya Open, Thailand	International	Hard	(China) Zhang Shuai	(Russia) Alla Kudryavtseva (Australia) Anastasia Rodionova	3–6, 7–6^{(7–5)}, [10–6]
Win	14–3	Feb 2014	Qatar Open	Premier 5	Hard	(Chinese Taipei) Hsieh Su-wei	(Czech Republic) Květa Peschke (Slovenia) Katarina Srebotnik	6–4, 6–0
Win	15–3	Mar 2014	Indian Wells Open, United States	Premier M	Hard	(Chinese Taipei) Hsieh Su-wei	(Zimbabwe) Cara Black (India) Sania Mirza	7–6^{(7–5)}, 6–2
Win	16–3	Jun 2014	French Open	Grand Slam	Clay	(Chinese Taipei) Hsieh Su-wei	(Italy) Sara Errani (Italy) Roberta Vinci	6–4, 6–1
Win	17–3	Oct 2014	China Open (2)	Premier M	Hard	(Czech Republic) Andrea Hlaváčková	(Zimbabwe) Cara Black (India) Sania Mirza	6–4, 6–4
Loss	17–4	Oct 2014	WTA Finals, Singapore	Finals	Hard (i)	(Chinese Taipei) Hsieh Su-wei	(Zimbabwe) Cara Black (India) Sania Mirza	1–6, 0–6
Win	18–4	Jun 2016	Nottingham Open, United Kingdom	International	Grass	(Czech Republic) Andrea Hlaváčková	(Canada) Gabriela Dabrowski (China) Zhaoxuan Yang	7–5, 3–6, [10–7]
Win	19–4	Sep 2016	Guangzhou Open, China (3)	International	Hard	(United States) Asia Muhammad	(Belarus) Olga Govortsova (Belarus) Vera Lapko	6–2, 7–6^{(6–3)}
Win	20–4	Oct 2016	Tianjin Open, China	International	Hard	(United States) Christina McHale	(China) Xu Yifan (Poland) Magda Linette	7–6^{(10–8)}, 6–0
Win	21–4	Jan 2017	Shenzhen Open, China	International	Hard	(Czech Republic) Andrea Hlaváčková	(Romania) Raluca Olaru (Ukraine) Olga Savchuk	6–1, 7–5
Loss	21–5	Jan 2017	Australian Open	Grand Slam	Hard	(Czech Republic) Andrea Hlaváčková	(United States) Bethanie Mattek-Sands (Czech Republic) Lucie Šafářová	7–6^{(7–4)}, 3–6, 3–6
Loss	21–6	Feb 2017	Dubai Championships, UAE	Premier 5	Hard	(Czech Republic) Andrea Hlaváčková	(Russia) Ekaterina Makarova (Russia) Elena Vesnina	2–6, 6–4, [7–10]
Loss	21–7	Feb 2018	Dubai Championships, UAE	Premier	Hard	(Chinese Taipei) Hsieh Su-wei	(Chinese Taipei) Chan Hao-ching (China) Yang Zhaoxuan	6–4, 2–6, [6–10]
Win	22–7	Jan 2019	Shenzhen Open, China (2)	International	Hard	(China) Yang Zhaoxuan	(China) Duan Yingying (Czech Republic) Renata Voráčová	6–4, 6–3
Loss	22–8	Sep 2019	Jiangxi Open, China	International	Hard	(China) Zhang Shuai	(China) Wang Xinyu (China) Zhu Lin	2–6, 6–7^{(5–7)}
Win	23–8	Sep 2019	Guangzhou Open, China (4)	International	Hard	(Germany) Laura Siegemund	(Chile) Alexa Guarachi (Mexico) Giuliana Olmos	6–2, 6–1
Loss	23–9	Jan 2020	Hobart International, Australia	International	Hard	(China) Zhang Shuai	(India) Sania Mirza (Ukraine) Nadiia Kichenok	4–6, 4–6

== WTA Challenger finals ==
=== Singles: 3 (2 titles, 1 runner–up) ===
Result	W–L	Date	Tournament	Surface	Opponent	Score
Win	1–0	Jul 2014	Jiangxi International Open, China	Hard	(China) Liu Fangzhou	6–2, 3–6, 6–3
Loss	1–1	Apr 2017	Zhengzhou Open, China	Hard	(China) Wang Qiang	6–3, 6–7^{(3)}, 1–1 ret.
Win	2–1	Nov 2018	Houston Challenger, United States	Hard	(United States) Lauren Davis	1–6, 7–5, 6–4

=== Doubles: 1 (1 title) ===
Result	W–L	Date	Tournament	Surface	Partner	Opponents	Score
Win	1–0	Apr 2019	Kunming Open, China	Clay	(China) Yang Zhaoxuan	(China) Duan Yingying (China) Han Xinyun	7–5, 6–2

== ITF Circuit finals ==
=== Singles: 16 (12 titles, 4 runner–ups) ===
Legend
$100,000 tournaments
$75,000 tournaments
$50,000 tournaments
$25,000 tournaments
$10,000 tournaments

Result	W–L	Date	Tournament	Tier	Surface	Opponent	Score
Win	1–0	Jun 2001	ITF Baotau, China	10,000	Clay	(South Korea) Jin-Young Choi	6–3, 6–4
Win	2–0	Jul 2001	ITF Tianjin, China	10,000	Hard	(China) Liu Nannan	1–0 ret.
Win	3–0	Feb 2002	ITF Mumbai, India	10,000	Hard	(United States) Sunitha Rao	6–3, 7–6^{(3)}
Loss	3–1	Mar 2002	ITF New Delhi, India	25,000	Hard	(Czech Republic) Eva Birnerová	4–6, 5–7
Win	4–1	Apr 2003	ITF Jackson, United States	25,000	Clay	(Austria) Tina Schiechtl	6–2, 6–4
Win	5–1	Dec 2003	ITF Changsha, China	50,000	Hard	(China) Zheng Jie	1–6, 6–2, 6–1
Loss	5–2	Feb 2004	ITF Columbus, United States	25,000	Hard	(Czech Republic) Nicole Vaidišová	6–7^{(2)}, 5–7
Win	6–2	Apr 2004	Hardee's Pro Classic, United States	75,000	Clay	(Israel) Evgenia Linetskaya	6–2, 6–1
Win	7–2	Jun 2004	ITF Prostějov, Czech Republic	75,000	Clay	(Czech Republic) Zuzana Ondrášková	6–1, 6–3
Win	8–2	Nov 2004	ITF Shenzhen, China	50,000	Hard	(China) Zheng Jie	3–6, 6–1, 6–3
Win	9–2	Nov 2010	Taipei Open, China	100,000	Carpet	(Japan) Ayumi Morita	6–1, 6–4
Loss	9–3	May 2016	Kunming Open, China	100,000	Clay	(China) Zhang Kailin	1–6, 6–0, 2–4 ret.
Win	10–3	Nov 2016	Shenzhen Open, China	100,000	Hard	(Romania) Patricia Maria Țig	3–6, 7–5, 6–4
Win	11–3	Dec 2018	Dubai Challenge, United Arab Emirates	100,000+H	Hard	(Slovakia) Viktória Kužmová	6–3, 6–0
Win	12–3	Oct 2019	Suzhou Ladies Open, China	100,000	Hard	(China) Zhu Lin	6–2, 3–6, 6–2
Loss	12–4	Nov 2019	Shenzhen Open, China	100,000	Hard	(China) Zhu Lin	3–6, 3–1 ret.

=== Doubles: 6 (3 titles, 3 runner–ups) ===
Legend
$75,000 tournaments
$25,000 tournaments
$10,000 tournaments

Result	W–L	Date	Tournament	Tier	Surface	Partnering	Opponents	Score
Loss	0–1	Jul 2001	ITF Tianjin, China	10,000	Clay	(China) Liu Nannan	(China) Ma Enyue (China) Xie Yanze	5–7, 7–5, 4–6
Win	1–1	Jun 2001	ITF Shenzhen, China	10,000	Hard	(China) Liu Nannan	(China) Li Ting (China) Lui-Li Shen	6-4, 6-1
Win	2–1	Nov 2003	ITF Taizhou, China	25,000	Hard	(China) Xie Yanze	(China) Yang Shujing (China) Yu Ying	6–3, 4–6, 6–2
Win	3–1	Jan 2004	ITF Boca Raton, United States	10,000	Hard	(China) Xie Yanze	(United States) Allison Bradshaw (United States) Julie Ditty	6–1, 6–2
Loss	3–2	Apr 2004	Dothan Pro Classic, United States	75,000	Clay	(China) Xie Yanze	(Australia) Lisa McShea (Venezuela) Milagros Sequera	7–6^{(6)}, 4–6, 2–6
Loss	3–3	Jun 2004	ITF Prostějov, Czech Republic	75,000	Clay	(China) Xie Yanze	(Czech Republic) Libuše Průšová (Czech Republic) Barbora Strýcová	1–6, 3–6

== Top 10 wins ==
#	Player	vsRank	Event	Surface	Round	Score
2005
1.	(Russia) Anastasia Myskina	3	Sydney International, Australia	Hard	2R	6–1, 6–3
2.	(Russia) Elena Dementieva	6	Southern California Open, U.S.	Hard	2R	7–5, 6–4
3.	(Belgium) Kim Clijsters	10	Southern California Open, U.S.	Hard	QF	6–4, 6–4
2007
4.	(France) Amélie Mauresmo	10	China Open	Hard	QF	4–6, 6–4, 6–2
2008
5.	(France) Marion Bartoli	9	Internationaux de Strasbourg, France	Clay	2R	6–1, 1–0 ret.
2009
6.	(Serbia) Jelena Janković	8	China Open	Hard	2R	4–6, 7–5, 6–2
2010
7.	(Poland) Agnieszka Radwańska	10	US Open	Hard	2R	2–6, 6–1, 6–4
2011
8.	(Serbia) Jelena Janković	8	Australian Open	Hard	2R	7–6^{(7–3)}, 6–3
9.	(Italy) Francesca Schiavone	5	Qatar Open	Hard	2R	7–5, 6–3
10.	(China) Li Na	7	Indian Wells Open, U.S.	Hard	2R	4–6, 6–3, 6–3
11.	(Russia) Vera Zvonareva	3	Brussels Open, Belgium	Clay	SF	6–3, 6–3
2012
12.	(France) Marion Bartoli	7	Dubai Championships, UAE	Hard	1R	6–4, 6–3
2014
13.	(Poland) Agnieszka Radwańska	5	US Open	Hard	2R	6–3, 6–4
2017
14.	(Poland) Agnieszka Radwańska	6	Indian Wells Open, U.S.	Hard	3R	6–4, 6–4
