= Zheng Jie career statistics =

Career finals
Discipline	Type	Won	Lost	Total	WR (Note: Winning rate)
Singles	Grand Slam	–	–	–	–
Singles	Summer Olympics	–	–	–	–
Singles	WTA Finals (Note: Formerly known as: Virginia Slims Championships (until 1995); WTA Tour Championships (until 2014))	–	–	–	–
Singles	WTA Elite (Note: Elite tier: WTA Tournament of Champions (2009–14); WTA Elite Trophy (2015–present))	–	–	–	–
Singles	WTA 1000 (Note: Formerly known as: Category 4 & 5 & 6 (until 1990); Tier I (until 2009); WTA Premier Mandatory and 5 (until 2021))	–	–	–	–
Singles	WTA 500 (Note: Formerly known as: Category 3 (until 1990); Tier II (until 2009); WTA Premier (until 2021))	0	1	1	0.00
Singles	WTA 250 (Note: Formerly known as: Category 1 & 2 (until 1990); Tier III & IV & V (until 2009); WTA International (until 2021))	4	2	6	0.67
Singles	Total	4	3	7	0.57
Doubles	Grand Slam	2	1	3	0.67
Doubles	Summer Olympics	–	–	–	–
Doubles	WTA Finals	–	–	–	–
Doubles	WTA Elite	–	–	–	–
Doubles	WTA 1000	3	2	5	0.60
Doubles	WTA 500	4	6	10	0.40
Doubles	WTA 250	6	6	12	0.50
Doubles	Total	15	15	30	0.50
Total		19	18	37	0.51

This is a list of the main career statistics of Chinese tennis player Zheng Jie. She has won 19 WTA titles (four in singles and 15 in doubles). All of her singles titles are from WTA International tier, but played one WTA Premier final at the 2010 Warsaw Open. Given that she was more successful as a doubles player, she also won two Grand Slam titles, the Australian Open and Wimbledon Championships, both in 2006. Along with that, she finished twice as a semifinalist in singles, at the 2008 Wimbledon Championships and in 2010 at the Australian Open.

Playing for China at the Olympic Games, in 2008 in Beijing, she get the bronze in doubles alongside Yan Zi. In doubles, she also triumphed at the three WTA Premier Mandatory & 5 tournaments; at the 2006 Berlin Open, at the 2007 Charleston Open and at the 2011 Italian Open. In mixed doubles, she reached four semifinals. On the WTA Rankings, she finished at the No. 15 in singles in May 2009, while in doubles she was No. 3 in July 2006.

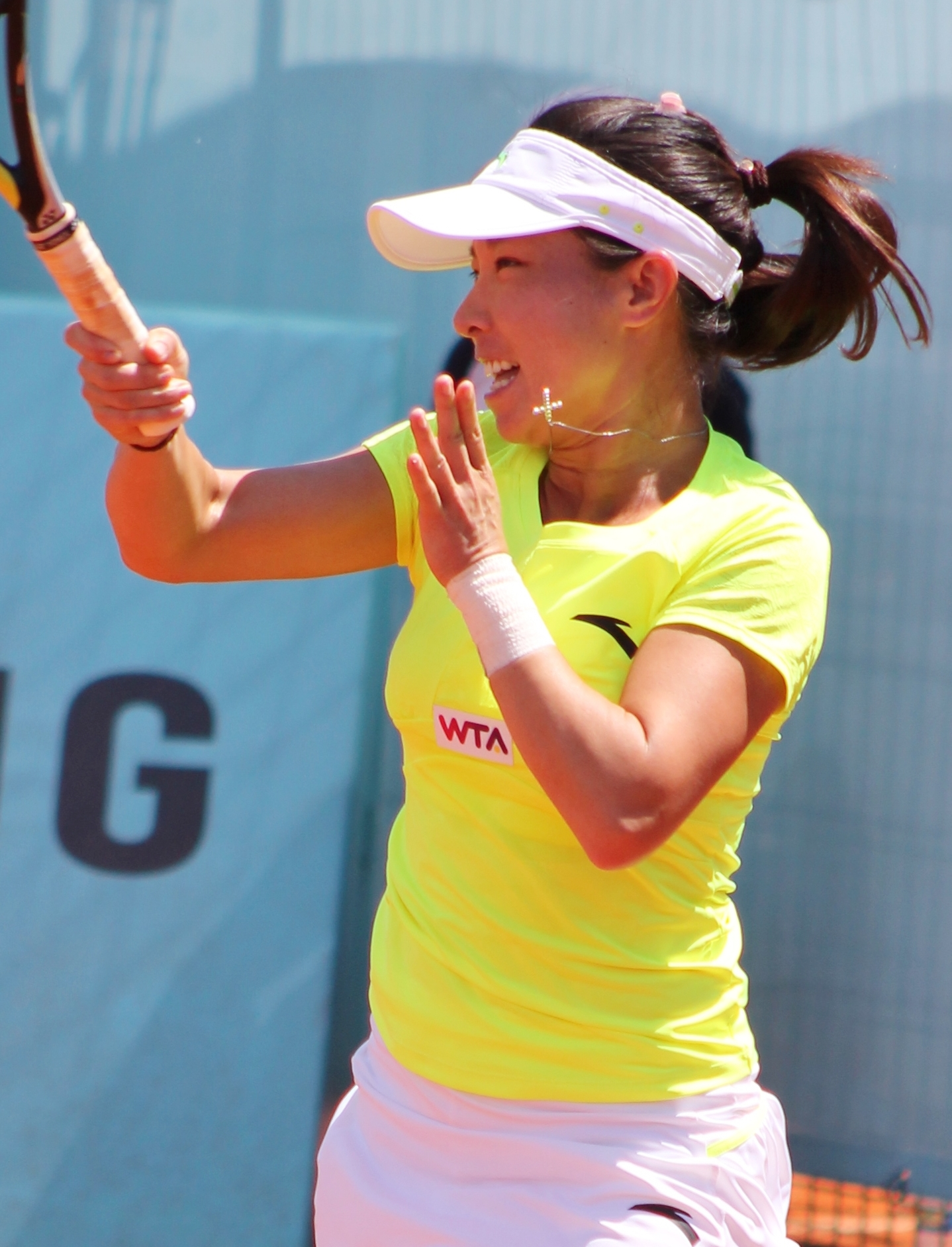
Zheng at the 2014 Madrid Open.

== Performance timelines ==
Key
W	F	SF	QF	#R	RR	Q#	P#	DNQ	A	Z#	PO	G	S	B	NMS	NTI	P	NH

(W) winner; (F) finalist; (SF) semifinalist; (QF) quarterfinalist; (#R) rounds 4, 3, 2, 1; (RR) round-robin stage; (Q#) qualification round; (P#) preliminary round; (DNQ) did not qualify; (A) absent; (Z#) Davis/Fed Cup Zonal Group (with number indication) or (PO) play-off; (G) gold, (S) silver or (B) bronze Olympic/Paralympic medal; (NMS) not a Masters tournament; (NTI) not a Tier I tournament; (P) postponed; (NH) not held; (SR) strike rate (events won / competed); (W–L) win–loss record.
To avoid confusion and double counting, these charts are updated at the conclusion of a tournament or when the player's participation has ended.

Only main-draw results in WTA Tour, Grand Slam tournaments, Billie Jean King Cup (Fed Cup), Hopman Cup and Olympic Games are included in win–loss records.

=== Singles ===
Tournament	2002	2003	2004	2005	2006	2007	2008	2009	2010	2011	2012	2013	2014	2015	SR	W–L	Win%
Grand Slam tournaments
Australian Open	A	Q1	1R	1R	1R	1R	A	4R	SF	A	4R	3R	3R	1R	0 / 10	15–10	60%
French Open	A	Q3	4R	1R	2R	1R	3R	2R	2R	2R	2R	3R	1R	A	0 / 11	12–11	52%
Wimbledon	A	A	1R	A	3R	A	SF	2R	2R	2R	3R	1R	2R	A	0 / 9	13–9	59%
US Open	Q2	Q2	1R	2R	2R	A	3R	3R	2R	2R	3R	3R	1R	A	0 / 10	12–10	55%
Win–loss	0–0	0–0	3–4	1–3	4–4	0–2	9–3	7–4	8–4	3–3	8–4	6–4	3–4	0–1	0 / 40	52–40	57%
National representation
Summer Olympics	NH		1R	NH			3R	NH			1R	NH			0 / 3	2–3	40%
Year-end championship
WTA Elite Trophy	NH							DNQ			RR	DNQ			0 / 1	0–3	0%
WTA 1000 + former^{†} tournaments
Dubai / Qatar Open (Note: The first Premier 5 event of the year has switched back and forth between the Dubai Tennis Championships and the Qatar Total Open since 2009. Dubai was classified as a Premier 5 event from 2009 to 2011 before being succeeded by Doha for the 2012–2014 period. In 2015, Dubai regained its Premier 5 status while Doha was demoted to Premier status. The Premier 5 tournaments were reclassified as WTA 1000 tournaments in 2021.)	NMS						1R	3R	1R	2R	1R	1R	A	A	0 / 6	3–6	33%
Indian Wells Open	A	A	A	A	1R	2R	3R	2R	QF	1R	3R	1R	2R	A	0 / 9	7–9	44%
Miami Open	A	A	2R	A	QF	2R	4R	4R	2R	2R	3R	2R	1R	A	0 / 10	14–10	58%
Berlin / Madrid Open (Note: In 2009, the Berlin Open was replaced by the Madrid Open. The Premier Mandatory tournaments were reclassified as WTA 1000 tournaments in 2021.)	A	A	Q1	A	3R	1R	A	2R	1R	1R	1R	1R	2R	A	0 / 8	4–8	33%
Italian Open	A	A	Q1	A	A	1R	Q1	3R	1R	1R	1R	2R	Q1	A	0 / 6	3–6	33%
Canadian Open	A	A	A	3R	2R	A	A	3R	QF	3R	A	1R	A	A	0 / 6	10–6	63%
Cincinnati Open	NH		NMS					1R	1R	2R	1R	Q1	A	A	0 / 4	1–4	20%
Pan Pacific / Wuhan Open (Note: In 2014, the Toray Pan Pacific Open was downgraded to a Premier event and replaced by the Wuhan Open. The Premier 5 tournaments were reclassified as WTA 1000 tournaments in 2021.)	A	A	1R	A	1R	2R	A	2R	A	1R	2R	A	A	A	0 / 6	3–6	33%
China Open	NMS							1R	A	2R	1R	1R	A	A	0 / 4	1–4	20%
Charleston Open^{†}	A	A	1R	A	A	3R	A	NMS							0 / 2	2–2	50%
Zurich Open^{†}	A	A	A	A	Q2	A	NH/NMS								0 / 0	0–0	–
Win–loss	0–0	0–0	1–3	2–1	7–5	3–6	5–3	10–9	6–7	6–9	4–8	2–7	2–3	0–0	0 / 61	48–61	44%
Career statistics
	2002	2003	2004	2005	2006	2007	2008	2009	2010	2011	2012	2013	2014	2015	SR	W–L	Win%
Tournaments	1	8	18	16	18	10	11	21	18	23	23	17	13	1	Career total: 198		
Titles	0	0	0	1	2	0	0	0	0	0	1	0	0	0	Career total: 4		
Finals	0	0	0	2	2	0	0	0	1	0	1	0	1	0	Career total: 8		
Hard win–loss	5–1	8–9	6–10	22–12	13–9	2–4	16–10	19–13	16–12	15–14	18–15	12–12	6–8	0–1	3 / 127	158–130	55%
Clay win–loss	0–2	0–0	4–4	7–4	11–4	4–5	2–1	6–6	5–4	2–6	2–5	5–4	1–2	0–0	1 / 45	49–47	51%
Grass win–loss	0–0	0–0	0–3	0–0	2–2	0–0	5–1	3–3	2–2	1–3	6–4	0–1	5–3	0–0	0 / 22	24–22	52%
Carpet win–loss	0–0	2–1	0–1	0–0	0–1	1–1	0–0	0–0	0–0	0–0	0–0	0–0	0–0	0–0	0 / 4	3–4	43%
Overall win–loss	5–3	10–10	10–18	29–16	26–16	7–10	23–12	28–22	23–18	18–23	26–24	17–17	12–13	0–1	4 / 198	234–203	54%
Win %	63%	50%	36%	64%	62%	41%	66%	56%	56%	44%	52%	50%	48%	0%	Career total: 54%		
Year-end ranking	183	94	67	44	33	163	25	36	26	48	26	52	91	949	$6,157,773		

=== Doubles ===
Tournament	2001	2002	2003	2004	2005	2006	2007	2008	2009	2010	2011	2012	2013	2014	2015	SR	W–L	Win%
Grand Slam tournaments
Australian Open	A	A	A	QF	1R	W	SF	SF	3R	3R	A	3R	QF	1R	F	1 / 10	25–9	74%
French Open	A	A	A	1R	3R	SF	1R	3R	QF	3R	2R	3R	3R	1R	3R	0 / 11	17–11	61%
Wimbledon	A	A	A	3R	A	W	A	3R	3R	1R	QF	1R	3R	SF	1R	1 / 9	21–8	72%
US Open	A	A	1R	2R	QF	QF	A	QF	QF	SF	1R	1R	SF	QF	A	0 / 11	23–11	68%
Win–loss	0–0	0–0	0–1	6–4	5–3	19–2	4–2	11–4	10–4	6–4	4–3	4–4	11–4	7–4	7–3	2 / 41	86–39	69%
National representation
Summer Olympics	NH			QF	NH			SF-B	NH			QF	NH		A	0 / 3	9–3	75%
Year-end championship
WTA Finals	DNQ					SF	DNQ									0 / 1	0–1	0%
WTA 1000 + former^{†} tournaments
Dubai / Qatar Open	NMS							2R	1R	QF	2R	QF	QF	A	A	0 / 6	6–6	50%
Indian Wells Open	A	A	A	A	A	2R	QF	F	2R	SF	2R	1R	QF	SF	A	0 / 9	17–9	65%
Miami Open	A	A	A	QF	A	1R	QF	1R	1R	SF	1R	QF	1R	2R	A	0 / 10	10–10	50%
Berlin / Madrid Open	A	A	A	QF	A	W	A (Note: Zheng alongside Yan Zi was scheduled to play in the second round after first round bye. However, the pair withdraw nearly before match due to Zheng's left ankle injury.)	1R	1R	2R	2R	2R	1R	QF	A	1 / 9	11–8	58%
Italian Open	A	A	A	1R	1R	A	A	2R	1R	A	W	1R	1R	1R	1R	1 / 9	6–8	43%
Canadian Open	A	A	A	A	2R	QF	A	A	1R	QF	A	A	2R	A	A	0 / 5	4–5	44%
Cincinnati Open	NH			NMS					SF	QF	SF	F	1R	A	A	0 / 5	11–5	69%
Pan Pacific / Wuhan Open	A	A	A	A	A	QF	SF	A	1R	A	1R	QF	A	A	A	0 / 5	4–5	44%
China Open	NMS								SF	A	QF	SF	QF	1R	A	0 / 5	10–5	67%
Charleston Open^{†}	A	A	A	1R	A	A	W	A	NMS							1 / 2	4–1	80%
Zurich Open^{†}	A	A	A	A	A	QF	A	NH/NMS								0 / 1	1–1	50%
Win–loss	0–0	0–0	0–0	4–4	1–2	7–5	10–3	6–5	6–9	13–6	12–7	13–8	6–8	6–5	0–1	3 / 66	84–63	57%
Career statistics
	2001	2002	2003	2004	2005	2006	2007	2008	2009	2010	2011	2012	2013	2014	2015	SR	W–L	Win%
Tournaments	1	2	11	18	18	20	9	17	18	16	17	19	17	15	7	Career total: 205		
Titles	0	0	0	0	2	6	2	1	0	2	1	0	1	0	0	Career total: 15		
Finals	0	0	1	0	4	8	2	4	1	3	2	2	1	0	2	Career total: 30		
Overall win–loss	1–1	4–3	10–11	21–18	30–15	48–14	18–6	35–16	25–19	33–14	25–16	30–18	24–16	19–15	12–7	15 / 205	335–189	64%
Year-end ranking	283	137	74	38	30	3	21	15	24	16	20	19	17	28	34			

=== Mixed doubles ===
Tournament	2006	2007	2008	2009	2010	2011	2012	2013	2014	2015	SR	W–L	Win%
Australian Open	A	A	1R	A	A	A	A	A	SF	A	0 / 2	3–2	60%
French Open	2R	A	SF (Note: Withdraw during the tournament. Not counted as a loss.)	A	A	2R	A	A	1R	SF	0 / 5	8–4	67%
Wimbledon	SF	A	A	A	A	A	QF	QF	1R	2R	0 / 5	6–5	55%
US Open	A	A	A	A	A	A	1R	A	A	A	0 / 1	0–1	0%
Win–loss	4–2	0–0	3–1	0–0	0–0	1–1	1–2	2–1	3–3	3–2	0 / 13	17–12	59%

== Significant finals ==
=== Grand Slams ===
==== Doubles: 3 (2 titles, 1 runner-up) ====
Result	Year	Tournament	Surface	Partner	Opponents	Score
Win	2006	Australian Open	Hard	(China) Yan Zi	(United States) Lisa Raymond (Australia) Samantha Stosur	2–6, 7–6^{(9–7)}, 6–3
Win	2006	Wimbledon	Grass	(China) Yan Zi	(Spain) Virginia Ruano Pascual (Argentina) Paola Suárez	6–3, 3–6, 6–2
Loss	2015	Australian Open	Hard	(Chinese Taipei) Chan Yung-jan	(United States) Bethanie Mattek-Sands (Czech Republic) Lucie Šafářová	4–6, 6–7^{(5–7)}

=== WTA 1000 ===
==== Doubles: 5 (3 titles, 2 runner-ups) ====
Result	Year	Tournament	Surface	Partner	Opponents	Score
Win	2006	German Open	Clay	(China) Yan Zi	(Russia) Elena Dementieva (Italy) Flavia Pennetta	6–2, 6–3
Win	2007	Charleston Cup	Hard	(China) Yan Zi	(China) Peng Shuai (China) Sun Tiantian	7–5, 6–0
Loss	2008	Indian Wells Open	Hard	(China) Yan Zi	(Russia) Dinara Safina (Russia) Elena Vesnina	3–6, 1–6
Win	2011	Italian Open	Clay	(China) Peng Shuai	(United States) Vania King (Kazakhstan) Yaroslava Shvedova	6–2, 6–3
Loss	2012	Cincinnati Open	Hard	(Slovenia) Katarina Srebotnik	(Czech Republic) Andrea Hlaváčková (Czech Republic) Lucie Hradecká	1–6, 3–6

=== Olympics ===
==== Doubles: 1 (bronze medal) ====
Result	Year	Tournament	Surface	Partner	Opponents	Score
Bronze	2008	Beijing Olympics	Hard	(China) Yan Zi	(Ukraine) Alona Bondarenko (Ukraine) Kateryna Bondarenko	6–2, 6–2

== WTA Tour finals ==
=== Singles: 7 (4 titles, 3 runner-ups) ===
Legend
WTA 500 (Premier) (0–1)
WTA 250 (Tier IV / Tier V / International) (4–2)

Result	W–L	Date	Tournament	Tier	Surface	Opponent	Score
Win	1–0	Jan 2005	Hobart International, Australia	Tier V	Hard	(Argentina) Gisela Dulko	6–2, 6–0
Loss	1–1	May 2005	Rabat Grand Prix, Morocco	Tier IV	Clay	(Spain) Nuria Llagostera Vives	4–6, 2–6
Win	2–1	May 2006	Estoril Open, Portugal	Tier IV	Clay	(China) Li Na	6–7^{(5–7)}, 7–5 ret.
Win	3–1	Aug 2006	Nordic Light Open, Sweden	Tier IV	Hard	(Russia) Anastasia Myskina	6–4, 6–1
Loss	3–2	May 2010	Warsaw Open, Poland	Premier	Clay	(Romania) Alexandra Dulgheru	3–6, 4–6
Win	4–2	Jan 2012	Auckland Open, New Zealand	International	Hard	(Italy) Flavia Pennetta	2–6, 6–3, 2–0 ret.
Loss	4–3	Jun 2014	Rosmalen Championships, Netherlands	International	Grass	(United States) CoCo Vandeweghe	2–6, 4–6

=== Doubles: 30 (15 titles, 15 runner-ups) ===
Legend
Grand Slam tournaments (2–1)
WTA 1000 (Tier I / Premier 5) (3–2)
WTA 500 (Tier II / Premier) (4–6)
WTA 250 (Tier III / Tier IV / Tier V / International) (6–6)

Result	W–L	Date	Tournament	Tier	Surface	Partner	Opponents	Score
Loss	0–1	Jun 2003	Austrian Open, Kitzbühel, Austria	Tier III	Clay	(China) Yan Zi	(China) Li Ting; (China) Sun Tiantian	3–6, 4–6
Win	1–1	Jan 2005	Hobart International, Australia	Tier V	Hard	(China) Yan Zi	(Spain) Anabel Medina Garrigues; (Russia) Dinara Safina	6–4, 7–5
Win	2–1	Feb 2005	Hyderabad Open, India	Tier IV	Hard	(China) Yan Zi	(China) Li Ting (China) Sun Tiantian	6–4, 6–1
Loss	2–2	Sep 2005	Bali International, Indonesia	Tier III	Hard	(China) Yan Zi	(Germany) Anna-Lena Grönefeld; (United States) Meghann Shaughnessy	3–6, 3–6
Loss	2–3	Sep 2005	China Open, Beijing, China	Tier II	Hard	(China) Yan Zi	(Venezuela) María Vento-Kabchi; (Spain) Nuria Llagostera Vives	2–6, 4–6
Win	3–3	Jan 2006	Australian Open, Melbourne, Australia	Grand Slam	Hard	(China) Yan Zi	(United States) Lisa Raymond; (Australia) Samantha Stosur	2–6, 7–6^{(9–7)}, 6–3
Loss	3–4	Feb 2006	Pattaya Open, Thailand	Tier IV	Hard	(China) Yan Zi	(China) Li Ting (China) Sun Tiantian	6–3, 1–6, 6–7^{(5–7)}
Win	4–4	May 2006	German Open, Berlin, Germany	Tier I	Clay	(China) Yan Zi	(Russia) Elena Dementieva; (Italy) Flavia Pennetta	6–2, 6–3
Win	5–4	May 2006	Rabat Grand Prix, Morocco	Tier IV	Clay	(China) Yan Zi	(United States) Ashley Harkleroad; (United States) Bethanie Mattek	6–1, 6–3
Win	6–4	Jun 2006	Rosmalen Open, Netherlands	Tier III	Grass	(China) Yan Zi	(Serbia) Ana Ivanovic; (Russia) Maria Kirilenko	3–6, 6–2, 6–2
Win	7–4	Jul 2006	Wimbledon, London, UK	Grand Slam	Grass	(China) Yan Zi	(Spain) Virginia Ruano Pascual; (Argentina) Paola Suárez	6–3, 3–6, 6–2
Loss	7–5	Apr 2006	Nordic Light Open, Sweden	Tier IV	Hard	(China) Yan Zi	(Czech Republic) Eva Birnerová; (Slovakia) Jarmila Gajdošová	6–0, 4–6, 2–6
Win	8–5	Aug 2006	Connecticut Open, US	Tier II	Hard	(China) Yan Zi	(United States) Lisa Raymond (Australia) Samantha Stosur	6–4, 6–2
Win	9–5	Apr 2007	Charleston Open, US	Tier I	Clay	(China) Yan Zi	(China) Peng Shuai (China) Sun Tiantian	7–5, 6–0
Win	10–5	May 2007	Internationaux de Strasbourg, France	Tier III	Clay	(China) Yan Zi	(Australia) Alicia Molik (China) Sun Tiantian	6–3, 6–4
Loss	10–6	Jan 2008	Australian Hardcourts Championships, Australia	Tier III	Hard	(China) Yan Zi	(Russia) Dinara Safina (Hungary) Ágnes Szávay	1–6, 2–6
Win	11–6	Jan 2008	Sydney International, Australia	Tier II	Hard	(China) Yan Zi	(Ukraine) Tatiana Perebiynis; (Belarus) Tatiana Poutchek	6–4, 7–6^{(7–5)}
Loss	11–7	Mar 2008	Dubai Championships, UAE	Tier II	Hard	(China) Yan Zi	(Zimbabwe) Cara Black; (United States) Liezel Huber	5–7, 2–6
Loss	11–8	Mar 2008	Indian Wells Masters, US	Tier I	Hard	(China) Yan Zi	(Russia) Dinara Safina (Russia) Elena Vesnina	1–6, 6–1, [8–10]
Loss	11–9	May 2009	Warsaw Open, Poland	Premier	Clay	(China) Yan Zi	(United States) Raquel Kops-Jones; (United States) Bethanie Mattek-Sands	1–6, 1–6
Win	12–9	Feb 2010	Malaysian Open, Malaysia	International	Hard	(Chinese Taipei) Chan Yung-jan	(Australia) Anastasia Rodionova; (Russia) Arina Rodionova	6–7^{(4–7)}, 6–2, [10–7]
Loss	12–10	Aug 2010	Stanford Classic, US	Premier	Hard	(Chinese Taipei) Chan Yung-jan	(United States) Lindsay Davenport (United States) Liezel Huber	5–7, 7–6^{(8–6)}, [8–10]
Win	13–10	Aug 2010	San Diego Open, US	Premier	Hard	(Russia) Maria Kirilenko	(United States) Lisa Raymond (Australia) Rennae Stubbs	6–4, 6–4
Loss	13–11	Feb 2011	Pattaya Open, Thailand	International	Hard	(China) Sun Shengnan	(Italy) Sara Errani; (Italy) Roberta Vinci	6–3, 3–6, [5–10]
Win	14–11	May 2011	Italian Open, Rome, Italy	Premier 5	Clay	(China) Peng Shuai	(United States) Vania King; (Kazakhstan) Yaroslava Shvedova	6–2, 6–3
Loss	14–12	May 2012	Brussels Open, Belgium	Premier	Clay	(Poland) Alicja Rosolska	(United States) Bethanie Mattek-Sands (India) Sania Mirza	3–6, 2–6
Loss	14–13	Aug 2012	Cincinnati Open, US	Premier 5	Hard	(Slovenia) Katarina Srebotnik	(Czech Republic) Andrea Hlaváčková; (Czech Republic) Lucie Hradecká	1–6, 3–6
Win	15–13	Aug 2013	Connecticut Open, US	Premier	Hard	(India) Sania Mirza	(Spain) Anabel Medina Garrigues (Slovenia) Katarina Srebotnik	6–3, 6–4
Loss	15–14	Jan 2015	Australian Open, Melbourne, Australia	Grand Slam	Hard	(Chinese Taipei) Chan Yung-jan	(United States) Bethanie Mattek-Sands (Czech Republic) Lucie Šafářová	4–6, 6–7^{(5–7)}
Loss	15–15	Jun 2015	Eastbourne International, UK	Premier	Grass	(Chinese Taipei) Chan Yung-jan	(France) Caroline Garcia (Slovenia) Katarina Srebotnik	6–7^{(5–7)}, 2–6

== ITF Circuit finals ==
=== Singles: 10 (4 titles, 6 runner–ups) ===
Legend
$50,000 tournaments
$25,000 tournaments
$10,000 tournaments

Result	W–L	Date	Tournament	Tier	Surface	Opponent	Score
Loss	0–1	Sep 2000	ITF Hangzhou, China	10,000	Hard	(China) Sun Tiantian	2–6, 2–6
Loss	0–2	Jun 2001	ITF Hohhot, China	10,000	Hard	(China) Ding Ding	5–7, 6–3, 3–6
Win	1–2	May 2002	ITF Shanghai, China	25,000	Hard	(China) Sun Tiantian	6–2, 6–2
Win	2–2	May 2002	ITF Tianjin, China	10,000	Hard (i)	(China) Xie Yanze	6–1, 6–2
Loss	2–3	Mar 2003	ITF Redding, United States	25,000	Hard	(Canada) Jana Nejedly	5–7, 6–7
Win	3–3	Aug 2003	ITF Bronx, United States	50,000	Hard	(Russia) Maria Kirilenko	4–6, 6–4, 6–4
Loss	3–4	Nov 2003	ITF Changsha, China	50,000	Hard	(China) Peng Shuai	6–1, 2–6, 1–6
Loss	3–5	Dec 2003	ITF Shenzhen, China	50,000	Hard	(Bulgaria) Sesil Karatantcheva	5–7, 6–1, 3–6
Win	4–5	Sep 2004	ITF Beijing, China	25,000	Hard	(China) Li Na	6–4, 6–4
Loss	4–6	Nov 2004	ITF Shenzhen, China	50,000	Hard	(China) Peng Shuai	6–3, 1–6, 3–6

=== Doubles: 24 (17 titles, 6 runner–ups, 1 not played) ===
Legend
$100,000 tournaments
$50,000 tournaments
$25,000 tournaments
$10,000 tournaments

Result	W–L	Date	Tournament	Tier	Surface	Partner	Opponents	Score
Loss	0–1	Sep 2000	ITF Zhejiang, China	10,000	Hard	(China) Yan Zi	(China) Chen Yan (China) Sun Tiantian	3–6, 5–7
Win	1–1	Jun 2001	ITF Hohhot, China	10,000	Hard	(China) Yan Zi	(China) Chen Yan (China) Sun Tiantian	6–4, 2–6, 6–3
Win	2–1	Jan 2002	ITF Hull, United Kingdom	10,000	Hard (i)	(China) Sun Tiantian	(Republic of Ireland) Claire Curran (Republic of Ireland) Elsa O'Riain	7–6^{(4)}, 7–5
Win	3–1	Feb 2002	ITF Tipton, United Kingdom	10,000	Hard (i)	(China) Yan Zi	(Netherlands) Tessy van de Ven (Netherlands) Suzanne van Hartingsveldt	6–1, 6–3
Win	4–1	Apr 2002	ITF Ho Chi Minh City, Vietnam	25,000	Hard	(China) Yan Zi	(Japan) Ayami Takase (Japan) Remi Tezuka	6–1, 1–6, 6–2
Win	5–1	Apr 2002	ITF Cagliari, Italy	10,000	Clay	(China) Yan Zi	(China) Li Na (China) Li Ting	6–4, 6–0
Win	6–1	Apr 2002	ITF Taranto, Italy	25,000	Clay	(China) Yan Zi	(Slovakia) Eva Fislová (Slovakia) Stanislava Hrozenská	6–2, 6–2
Win	7–1	Apr 2002	ITF Maglie, Italy	25,000	Carpet	(China) Yan Zi	(United States) Edina Gallovits-Hall (Romania) Magda Mihalache	6–4, 6–1
Win	8–1	May 2002	ITF Shanghai, China	25,000	Hard	(China) Yan Zi	(China) He Chunyan (China) Liu Weijuan	6–2, 6–2
Win	9–1	May 2002	ITF Tianjin, China	25,000	Hard (i)	(China) Yan Zi	(Chinese Taipei) Chan Chin-wei (Chinese Taipei) Chuang Chia-jung	6–0, 6–4
Loss	9–2	Aug 2002	ITF Beijing, China	25,000	Hard	(China) Yan Zi	(China) Li Ting (China) Sun Tiantian	5–7, 3–6
DNP	–	Mar 2003	ITF Fountain Hills, United States	50,000	Hard	(China) Yan Zi	(Australia) Alicia Molik (Australia) Trudi Musgrave	—N/a
Win	10–2	Mar 2003	ITF Redding, United States	25,000	Hard	(China) Yan Zi	(United States) Jennifer Hopkins (United States) Abigail Spears	7–6^{(3)}, 7–6^{(5)}
Win	11–2	Jun 2003	ITF Gorizia, Italy	25,000	Clay	(China) Yan Zi	(China) Li Ting (China) Sun Tiantian	7–6^{(5)}, 1–6, 6–4
Win	12–2	Jun 2003	ITF Orbetello, Italy	50,000	Clay	(China) Yan Zi	(China) Li Ting (China) Sun Tiantian	6–2, 7–5
Win	13–2	Oct 2003	ITF Sedona, United States	50,000	Clay	(China) Yan Zi	(Russia) Alina Jidkova (Paraguay) Rossana de los Ríos	7–6^{(2)}, 7–6^{(3)}
Win	14–2	Oct 2003	ITF Paducah, United States	50,000	Hard	(China) Yan Zi	(South Africa) Kim Grant (United States) Samantha Reeves	6–2, 6–3
Loss	14–3	Nov 2003	ITF Changsha, China	50,000	Hard	(China) Yan Zi	(China) Li Ting (China) Sun Tiantian	4–6, 2–6
Loss	14–4	Dec 2003	ITF Shenzhen, China	50,000	Hard	(China) Yan Zi	(China) Li Ting (China) Sun Tiantian	3–6, 6–3, 4–6
Loss	14–5	Sep 2004	ITF Beijing, China	25,000	Hard	(China) Li Shanshan	(China) Yang Shujing (China) Yu Ying	4–6, 3–6
Win	15–5	Oct 2004	ITF Shenzhen, China	50,000	Hard	(China) Yan Zi	(Chinese Taipei) Chuang Chia-jung (Chinese Taipei) Hsieh Su-wei	6–3, 6–1
Loss	15–6	Nov 2004	ITF Shenzhen, China	50,000	Hard	(China) Yan Zi	(Japan) Rika Fujiwara (Ukraine) Elena Tatarkova	4–6, 6–1, 1–6
Win	16–6	Jun 2005	ITF Beijing, China	50,000	Hard	(China) Yan Zi	(China) Li Ting (China) Sun Tiantian	6–1, 7–5
Win	17–6	Nov 2011	ITF Taipei, Taiwan	100,000	Hard (i)	(Chinese Taipei) Latisha Chan	(Czech Republic) Karolína Plíšková (Czech Republic) Kristýna Plíšková	7–6^{(5)}, 5–7, 6–3

== Record against other players ==
=== Top 10 wins ===
Season	2008	2009	2010	2011	2012	2013	Total
Wins	3	2	2	1	1	3	12

#	Player	vsRank	Event	Surface	Round	Score
2008
1.	(Serbia) Ana Ivanovic	1	Wimbledon Championships, UK	Grass	3R	6–1, 6–4
2.	(Poland) Agnieszka Radwańska	10	China Open	Hard	1R	6–2, 6–3
3.	(Serbia) Ana Ivanovic	4	China Open	Hard	QF	7–6^{(7–4)}, 2–6, 6–4
2009
4.	(Russia) Dinara Safina	1	LA Championships, U.S.	Hard	3R	7–5, 4–6, 6–4
5.	(Denmark) Caroline Wozniacki	8	Canadian Open	Hard	2R	7–5, 6–3
2010
6.	(Denmark) Caroline Wozniacki	3	Warsaw Open, Poland	Clay	QF	6–3, ret.
7.	(Russia) Elena Dementieva	8	Canadian Open	Hard	3R	7–6^{(7–3)}, 6–4
2011
8.	(Belgium) Kim Clijsters	2	Canadian Open	Hard	2R	3–6, 2–1, ret.
2012
9.	(France) Marion Bartoli	9	Australian Open	Hard	3R	6–3, 6–3
2013
10.	(Australia) Samantha Stosur	9	Sydney International, Australia	Hard	1R	6–3, 6–7^{(9–7)}, 6–4
11.	(Australia) Samantha Stosur	9	Australian Open	Hard	2R	6–4, 1–6, 7–5
12.	(Denmark) Caroline Wozniacki	10	Brussels Open, Belgium	Clay	2R	6–2, 6–4
