= 2012 Italian Open – Men's singles =

Men's singles
- 2012 Italian Open

Final
- Champion: (Spain) Rafael Nadal
- Runner-up: (Serbia) Novak Djokovic
- Score: 7–5, 6–3

Events
Singles	men	women
Doubles	men	women
← 2011 ·	Italian Open	· 2013 →

Rafael Nadal defeated defending champion Novak Djokovic in a rematch of the previous year's final, 7–5, 6–3 to win the men's singles tennis title at the 2012 Italian Open. It was his record-extending sixth Italian Open title. He did not lose a set during the tournament.

== Seeds ==
The top eight seeds receive a bye into the second round.

1. (Serbia) Novak Djokovic (final)
2. (Spain) Rafael Nadal (champion)
3. (Switzerland) Roger Federer (semifinals)
4. (United Kingdom) Andy Murray (third round)
5. (France) Jo-Wilfried Tsonga (quarterfinals)
6. (Spain) David Ferrer (semifinals)
7. (Czech Republic) Tomáš Berdych (quarterfinals)
8. (Serbia) Janko Tipsarević (second round)
9. (United States) John Isner (second round)
10. (Argentina) Juan Martín del Potro (third round)
11. (France) Gilles Simon (third round)
12. (Spain) Nicolás Almagro (third round)
13. (France) Gaël Monfils (second round)
14. (Argentina) Juan Mónaco (third round)
15. (Spain) Feliciano López (first round)
16. (France) Richard Gasquet (quarterfinals)

Click on the seed number of a player to go to their draw section.

== Draw ==
=== Key ===
- Q = Qualifier
- WC = Wild card
- LL = Lucky loser
- Alt = Alternate
- ITF = ITF entry
- PR = Protected ranking
- SR = Special ranking
- SE = Special exempt
- JE = Junior exempt
- JR = Junior Accelerator Programme entrant
- CO = College Accelerator Programme entrant
- NG = Next Gen Accelerator Program entrant
- w/o = Walkover
- r = Retired
- d = Defaulted

=== Finals ===
Quarterfinals
1	(Serbia) Novak Djokovic	7	6
5	(France) Jo-Wilfried Tsonga	5	1
3	(Switzerland) Roger Federer	6	6
(Italy) Andreas Seppi	1	2
6	(Spain) David Ferrer	7^{7}	6
16	(France) Richard Gasquet	6^{4}	3
7	(Czech Republic) Tomáš Berdych	4	5
2	(Spain) Rafael Nadal	6	7

Semifinals
1	(Serbia) Novak Djokovic	6	7^{7}
3	(Switzerland) Roger Federer	2	6^{4}
6	(Spain) David Ferrer	6^{6}	0
2	(Spain) Rafael Nadal	7^{8}	6

Final
1	(Serbia) Novak Djokovic	5	3
2	(Spain) Rafael Nadal	7	6

=== Top half ===
==== Section 1 ====
First round
(Australia) B Tomic	4	6	6
Q	(Colombia) S Giraldo	6	2	4
(Czech Republic) R Štěpánek	2	6	6
(Argentina) JI Chela	6	0	3
Q	(Romania) A Ungur	2	2
14	(Argentina) J Mónaco	6	6
10	(Argentina) JM del Potro	7	3	6
(France) M Llodra	5	6	4
(Brazil) T Bellucci	2	6	3
(Russia) M Youzhny	6	3	6
(Serbia) V Troicki	4	6	6
WC	(Italy) F Volandri	6	4	3

Second round
1	(Serbia) N Djokovic	6	6
(Australia) B Tomic	3	3
(Czech Republic) R Štěpánek	4	2
14	(Argentina) J Mónaco	6	6
10	(Argentina) JM del Potro	6	6
(Russia) M Youzhny	4	2
(Serbia) V Troicki	3	2
5	(France) J-W Tsonga	6	6

Third round
1	(Serbia) N Djokovic	4	6	6
14	(Argentina) J Mónaco	6	2	3
10	(Argentina) JM del Potro	4	1
5	(France) J-W Tsonga	6	6

Quarterfinals
1	(Serbia) N Djokovic	7	6
5	(France) J-W Tsonga	5	1

==== Section 2 ====
First round
Q	(Slovenia) B Kavčič	1	3
(Argentina) C Berlocq	6	6
(South Africa) K Anderson	4	5
(Spain) JC Ferrero	6	7
(Russia) A Bogomolov Jr.	4	1
13	(France) G Monfils	6	6
9	(United States) J Isner	2	7^{7}	6
(Germany) P Kohlschreiber	6	6^{3}	2
(Italy) A Seppi	6	3	6
(Uzbekistan) D Istomin	4	6	3
(Switzerland) S Wawrinka	6	4	7
Q	(Netherlands) R Haase	1	6	5

Second round
3	(Switzerland) R Federer	6	6
(Argentina) C Berlocq	3	4
(Spain) JC Ferrero	7	6
13	(France) G Monfils	5	3
9	(United States) J Isner	6	6^{5}	5
(Italy) A Seppi	2	7^{7}	7
(Switzerland) S Wawrinka	6	6
8	(Serbia) J Tipsarević	3	1

Third round
3	(Switzerland) R Federer	6	5	6
(Spain) JC Ferrero	2	7	1
(Italy) A Seppi	6^{1}	7^{8}	7^{8}
(Switzerland) S Wawrinka	7^{7}	6^{6}	6^{6}

Quarterfinals
3	(Switzerland) R Federer	6	6
(Italy) A Seppi	1	2

=== Bottom half ===
==== Section 3 ====
First round
(Spain) F Verdasco	6
(Ukraine) A Dolgopolov	0^{r}
Q	(Spain) G García López	6	6
(Spain) P Andújar	4	1
(United States) D Young	2	5
11	(France) G Simon	6	7
16	(France) R Gasquet	6	7^{8}
(Austria) J Melzer	1	6^{6}
(Russia) N Davydenko	3	6	3
WC	(Italy) P Lorenzi	6	2	6
Q	(Spain) A Ramos	3	4
(Argentina) D Nalbandian	6	6

Second round
6	(Spain) D Ferrer	6	7^{7}
(Spain) F Verdasco	3	6^{3}
Q	(Spain) G García López	4	6	4
11	(France) G Simon	6	2	6
16	(France) R Gasquet	6	6
WC	(Italy) P Lorenzi	3	2
(Argentina) D Nalbandian	1	6	5
4	(United Kingdom) A Murray	6	4	7

Third round
6	(Spain) D Ferrer	6	7^{7}
11	(France) G Simon	0	6^{5}
16	(France) R Gasquet	6^{1}	6	6
4	(United Kingdom) A Murray	7^{7}	3	2

Quarterfinals
6	(Spain) D Ferrer	7^{7}	6
16	(France) R Gasquet	6^{4}	3

==== Section 4 ====
First round
(Poland) Ł Kubot	6	5	6
WC	(Italy) P Starace	3	7	2
Q	(United States) S Querrey	7^{7}	5	6
(Finland) J Nieminen	6^{4}	7	4
(Croatia) M Čilić	2	6	0
12	(Spain) N Almagro	6	3	6
15	(Spain) F López	4	4
(Spain) M Granollers	6	6
WC	(Italy) F Fognini	6	6
(Cyprus) M Baghdatis	2	2
(Canada) M Raonic	6^{5}	4
(Germany) F Mayer	7^{7}	6

Second round
7	(Czech Republic) T Berdych	6	6
(Poland) Ł Kubot	4	1
Q	(United States) S Querrey	5	2
12	(Spain) N Almagro	7	6
(Spain) M Granollers	6	6
WC	(Italy) F Fognini	3	4
(Germany) F Mayer	1	5
2	(Spain) R Nadal	6	7

Third round
7	(Czech Republic) T Berdych	7^{7}	6
12	(Spain) N Almagro	6^{3}	3
(Spain) M Granollers	1	1
2	(Spain) R Nadal	6	6

Quarterfinals
7	(Czech Republic) T Berdych	4	5
2	(Spain) R Nadal	6	7

== Qualifying ==
=== Seeds ===
1. (Spain) Albert Ramos (qualified)
2. (Netherlands) Robin Haase (qualified)
3. (Kazakhstan) Mikhail Kukushkin (qualifying competition)
4. (Colombia) Santiago Giraldo (qualified)
5. (Luxembourg) Gilles Müller (qualifying competition, withdrew)
6. (Colombia) Alejandro Falla (first round)
7. (Japan) Go Soeda (first round)
8. (Croatia) Ivo Karlović (qualifying competition)
9. (United States) Ryan Harrison (first round)
10. (Spain) Albert Montañés (first round)
11. (Australia) Matthew Ebden (first round)
12. (Belgium) Xavier Malisse (qualifying competition)
13. (United States) Sam Querrey (qualified)
14. (Russia) Igor Andreev (withdrew because of a right shoulder injury)

=== Qualifiers ===
1. (Spain) Albert Ramos
2. (Netherlands) Robin Haase
3. (United States) Sam Querrey
4. (Colombia) Santiago Giraldo
5. (Romania) Adrian Ungur
6. (Spain) Guillermo García López
7. (Slovenia) Blaž Kavčič

=== Qualifying draw ===
==== First qualifier ====
First round
1	(Spain) Albert Ramos	7^{7}	6
(Spain) Daniel Gimeno Traver	6^{3}	4
WC	(Italy) Gianluca Naso	6	6
11	(Australia) Matthew Ebden	3	0

Qualifying competition
1	(Spain) Albert Ramos	6	6
WC	(Italy) Gianluca Naso	4	3

==== Second qualifier ====
First round
2	(Netherlands) Robin Haase	6	7^{11}
(Ukraine) Sergiy Stakhovsky	4	6^{9}
WC	(Italy) Matteo Viola	4	4
12	(Belgium) Xavier Malisse	6	6

Qualifying competition
2	(Netherlands) Robin Haase	6	3	6
12	(Belgium) Xavier Malisse	3	6	4

==== Third qualifier ====
First round
3	(Kazakhstan) Mikhail Kukushkin	6	6
(Italy) Flavio Cipolla	1	3
(Italy) Simone Bolelli	3	4
13	(United States) Sam Querrey	6	6

Qualifying competition
3	(Kazakhstan) Mikhail Kukushkin	6	4	3
13	(United States) Sam Querrey	3	6	6

==== Fourth qualifier ====
First round
4	(Colombia) Santiago Giraldo	4	6	7^{7}
(Latvia) Ernests Gulbis	6	3	6^{4}
(Romania) Victor Hănescu	6	6
9	(United States) Ryan Harrison	4	2

Qualifying competition
4	(Colombia) Santiago Giraldo	6	6
(Romania) Victor Hănescu	2	3

==== Fifth qualifier ====
First round
5	(Luxembourg) Gilles Müller	6	7
(Canada) Vasek Pospisil	1	5
(Romania) Adrian Ungur	7^{7}	6
10	(Spain) Albert Montañés	6^{2}	1

Qualifying competition
5	(Luxembourg) Gilles Müller
(Romania) Adrian Ungur	w/o

==== Sixth qualifier ====
First round
6	(Colombia) Alejandro Falla	2	0
(Spain) Guillermo García López	6	6
(Germany) Philipp Petzschner	0	6^{3}
8	(Croatia) Ivo Karlović	6	7^{7}

Qualifying competition
(Spain) Guillermo García López	6	6
8	(Croatia) Ivo Karlović	4	4

==== Seventh qualifier ====
First round
7	(Japan) Go Soeda	5	6	3
WC	(Italy) Marco Cecchinato	7	2	6
WC	(Italy) Enrico Burzi	2	4
Alt	(Slovenia) Blaž Kavčič	6	6

Qualifying competition
WC	(Italy) Marco Cecchinato	6	1	2
Alt	(Slovenia) Blaž Kavčič	4	6	6
