= 2011 Italian Open (tennis) =

- Date: 9–15 May
- Edition: 68th
- Surface: Clay / outdoor
- Location: Rome, Italy
- Venue: Foro Italico

Champions

Men's singles
- (Serbia) Novak Djokovic

Women's singles
- (Russia) Maria Sharapova

Men's doubles
- (United States) John Isner / (United States) Sam Querrey

Women's doubles
- (China) Peng Shuai / (China) Zheng Jie
- Italian Open

The 2011 Italian Open (also known as the 2011 Rome Masters and sponsored title 2011 Internazionali BNL d'Italia) was a tennis tournament, being played on outdoor clay courts at the Foro Italico in Rome, Italy. It was the 68th edition of the event and was classified as an ATP World Tour Masters 1000 event on the 2011 ATP World Tour and a Premier 5 event on the 2011 WTA Tour. It took place from 9 to 15 May 2011.

== Points and prize money ==
=== Point distribution ===
Stage	Men's singles	Men's doubles	Women's singles	Women's doubles
Champion	1000		900	
Runner up	600		620	
Semifinals	360		395	
Quarterfinals	180		225	
Round of 16	90		125	
Round of 32	45	10	70	1
Round of 64	10	–	1	–
Qualifier	25	–	30	–
Qualifying Finalist	14	–	20	–
Qualifying 1st round		–	1	–

=== Prize money ===
All money is in Euros

Stage	Men's singles	Men's doubles	Women's singles	Women's doubles
Champion	€438,000	€134,500	€350,000	€100,000
Runner up	€205,000	€63,400	€175,000	€50,000
Semifinals	€104,400	€32,000	€87,500	€25,000
Quarterfinals	€53,500	€16,400	€40,000	€12,500
Round of 16	€27,750	€8,540	€20,000	€6,250
Round of 32	€14,635	€4,550	€10,275	€3,170
Round of 64	€7,715	–	€5,400	–
Final round qualifying	€1,820	–	€2,900	–
First round qualifying	€900	–	€1,500	–

== ATP entrants ==
=== Seeds ===
Country	Player	Rank^{1}	Seed
ESP	Rafael Nadal	1	1
SRB	Novak Djokovic	2	2
SUI	Roger Federer	3	3
GBR	Andy Murray	4	4
SWE	Robin Söderling	5	5
ESP	~~David Ferrer~~	~~6~~	~~6~~
CZE	Tomáš Berdych	7	7
AUT	Jürgen Melzer	8	8
ESP	Nicolás Almagro	9	9
FRA	~~Gaël Monfils~~	~~10~~	~~10~~
USA	Mardy Fish	11	11
USA	Andy Roddick	12	12
RUS	Mikhail Youzhny	13	13
SUI	Stanislas Wawrinka	14	14
SRB	Victor Troicki	15	15
FRA	Richard Gasquet	16	16

- Rankings are as of 2 May 2011.

=== Other entrants ===
The following players received wildcards into the main draw:

- (Italy) Simone Bolelli
- (Italy) Fabio Fognini
- (Italy) Potito Starace
- (Italy) Filippo Volandri

The following players received entry via qualifying:

- (Russia) Igor Andreev
- (Uruguay) Pablo Cuevas
- (Romania) Victor Hănescu
- (Poland) Łukasz Kubot
- (Italy) Paolo Lorenzi
- ~~(Japan) Kei Nishikori~~
- (Spain) Pere Riba

The following players received entry from a lucky losers spot:

- (France) Adrian Mannarino
- (Finland) Jarkko Nieminen
- (Argentina) Carlos Berlocq

=== Withdrawals ===
The following notable players withdrew from the event:

- (Croatia) Ivan Dodig (plays at Zagreb Challenger instead)
- (Latvia) Ernests Gulbis (withdrew due to respiratory problems)
- (Serbia) Janko Tipsarević (withdrew due to a right leg injury)
- (Argentina) David Nalbandian (withdrew due to illness)
- (Spain) Tommy Robredo
- (France) Gaël Monfils (withdrew due to sickness)
- (Spain) David Ferrer (withdrew due to illness)
- (Japan) Kei Nishikori

== WTA entrants ==
=== Seeds ===
Country	Player	Rank^{1}	Seed
Denmark	Caroline Wozniacki	1	1
Italy	Francesca Schiavone	4	2
Belarus	Victoria Azarenka	5	3
China	Li Na	6	4
Serbia	Jelena Janković	7	5
Australia	Samantha Stosur	8	6
Russia	Maria Sharapova	9	7
Poland	Agnieszka Radwańska	11	8
France	Marion Bartoli	12	9
Israel	Shahar Pe'er	13	10
Russia	Svetlana Kuznetsova	14	11
Germany	Andrea Petkovic	15	12
Serbia	Ana Ivanovic	17	13
Estonia	Kaia Kanepi	19	14
Italy	Flavia Pennetta	20	15
Russia	Anastasia Pavlyuchenkova	21	16

- Rankings are as of 2 May 2011.

=== Other entrants ===
The following players received wildcards into the main draw:

- (Italy) Alberta Brianti
- (Italy) Corinna Dentoni
- (Italy) Romina Oprandi

The following players received entry via qualifying:

- (Slovenia) Polona Hercog
- (United States) Varvara Lepchenko
- (United States) Christina McHale
- (Spain) Anabel Medina Garrigues
- (Spain) Arantxa Parra Santonja
- (Austria) Tamira Paszek
- (Australia) Anastasia Rodionova
- (South Africa) Chanelle Scheepers

The following players received entry from a lucky losers spot:

- (Germany) Angelique Kerber
- (China) Zheng Jie

=== Withdrawals ===
The following notable players withdrew from the event:

- (Belgium) Kim Clijsters (torn ligaments, right ankle)
- (Slovakia) Dominika Cibulková (left abdominal injury)
- (Germany) Julia Görges (lower back injury)
- (Russia) Anna Chakvetadze (withdrew due to sickness)
- (Hungary) Ágnes Szávay (lower back injury)
- (United States) Serena Williams (pulmonary embolism)
- (United States) Venus Williams (torn abdominal)

== Finals ==
=== Men's singles ===
(Serbia) Novak Djokovic defeated (Spain) Rafael Nadal, 6–4, 6–4

- It was Djokovic's 7th title of the year and 25th of his career. It was his 39th consecutive match win. It was his 2nd title in Rome, also winning in 2008. It was his 4th Masters of the year and 9th of his career.

=== Women's singles ===
(Russia) Maria Sharapova defeated (Australia) Samantha Stosur, 6–2, 6–4

- It was Sharapova's 1st title of the year and 23rd of her career.

=== Men's doubles ===
(United States) John Isner / (United States) Sam Querrey defeated (United States) Mardy Fish / (United States) Andy Roddick, w/o

=== Women's doubles ===
(China) Peng Shuai / (China) Zheng Jie defeated (United States) Vania King / (Kazakhstan) Yaroslava Shvedova, 6–2, 6–3
