= 2011 Italian Open – Men's doubles =

Men's doubles
- 2011 Italian Open

Final
- Champions: (United States) John Isner (United States) Sam Querrey
- Runners-up: (United States) Mardy Fish (United States) Andy Roddick
- Score: w/o

Events
Singles	men	women
Doubles	men	women
← 2010 ·	Italian Open	· 2012 →

Bob Bryan and Mike Bryan were the defending champions, but they lost to Mardy Fish and Andy Roddick in the quarterfinals.

Roddick eventually withdrew from the final because of a shoulder injury and American couple John Isner and Sam Querrey won the title.

== Seeds ==
All seeds receive a bye into the second round.

1. (United States) Bob Bryan / (United States) Mike Bryan (quarterfinals)
2. (Belarus) Max Mirnyi / (Canada) Daniel Nestor (second round)
3. (India) Mahesh Bhupathi / (India) Leander Paes (second round)
4. (Austria) Jürgen Melzer / (Pakistan) Aisam-ul-Haq Qureshi (withdrew due to Melzer's back strain injury)
5. (Poland) Mariusz Fyrstenberg / (Poland) Marcin Matkowski (second round)
6. (Poland) Łukasz Kubot / (Austria) Oliver Marach (quarterfinals)
7. (France) Michaël Llodra / (Serbia) Nenad Zimonjić (quarterfinals)
8. (South Africa) Wesley Moodie / (Belgium) Dick Norman (second round)

== Draw ==
=== Key ===
- Q = Qualifier
- WC = Wild card
- LL = Lucky loser
- Alt = Alternate
- SE = Special exempt
- PR = Protected ranking
- ITF = ITF entry
- JE = Junior exempt
- w/o = Walkover
- r = Retired
- d = Defaulted
- SR = Special ranking

=== Finals ===
Semifinals
(United States) Mardy Fish (United States) Andy Roddick	7	6
Alt	(Argentina) Carlos Berlocq (Finland) Jarkko Nieminen	6^{7}	2
(United States) John Isner (United States) Sam Querrey	6	6
WC	(Italy) Simone Bolelli (Italy) Fabio Fognini	4	3

Final
(United States) Mardy Fish (United States) Andy Roddick
(United States) John Isner (United States) Sam Querrey	w/o

=== Top half ===
First round
(Spain) M López (Spain) D Marrero	3	4
(The Bahamas) M Knowles (Slovakia) M Mertiňák	6	6
(Czech Republic) T Berdych (Czech Republic) L Dlouhý	3	6	[17]
(United States) M Fish (United States) A Roddick	6	2	[19]
(United States) E Butorac (Curaçao) J-J Rojer	6^{3}	7	[6]
(Spain) G García López (Spain) A Montañés	7	5	[10]
Alt	(Mexico) S González (Argentina) JI Chela	6^{5}	4
Alt	(Ukraine) A Dolgopolov (Belgium) X Malisse	7	6

Second round
1	(United States) B Bryan (United States) M Bryan	6	6
(The Bahamas) M Knowles (Slovakia) M Mertiňák	3	2
(United States) M Fish (United States) A Roddick	6	7
8	(South Africa) W Moodie (Belgium) D Norman	4	6^{7}
Alt	(Argentina) C Berlocq (Finland) J Nieminen	2	6	[15]
(Spain) G García López (Spain) A Montañés	6	3	[13]
Alt	(Ukraine) A Dolgopolov (Belgium) X Malisse	2	4
7	(France) M Llodra (Serbia) N Zimonjić	6	6

Quarterfinals
1	(United States) B Bryan (United States) M Bryan	6	6^{1}	[4]
(United States) M Fish (United States) A Roddick	4	7	[10]
Alt	(Argentina) C Berlocq (Finland) J Nieminen	6	6
7	(France) M Llodra (Serbia) N Zimonjić	4	3

Semifinals
(United States) M Fish (United States) A Roddick	7	6
Alt	(Argentina) C Berlocq (Finland) J Nieminen	6^{7}	2

=== Bottom half ===
First round
(Cyprus) M Baghdatis (Croatia) I Ljubičić	6	2	[10]
(France) R Gasquet (France) J-W Tsonga	2	6	[3]
(United Kingdom) J Murray (Switzerland) S Wawrinka	3	4
(United States) J Isner (United States) S Querrey	6	6
(Spain) F López (Spain) F Verdasco	6^{6}	4
(Sweden) R Lindstedt (Romania) H Tecău	7	6
WC	(Italy) D Bracciali (Italy) P Starace	4	4
WC	(Italy) S Bolelli (Italy) F Fognini	6	6

Second round
6	(Poland) Ł Kubot (Austria) O Marach	7	6
(Cyprus) M Baghdatis (Croatia) I Ljubičić	6^{7}	4
(United States) J Isner (United States) S Querrey	6	3	[10]
3	(India) M Bhupathi (India) L Paes	3	6	[5]
5	(Poland) M Fyrstenberg (Poland) M Matkowski	7	6^{7}	[3]
(Sweden) R Lindstedt (Romania) H Tecău	5	7	[10]
WC	(Italy) S Bolelli (Italy) F Fognini	6	6
2	(Belarus) M Mirnyi (Canada) D Nestor	2	2

Quarterfinals
6	(Poland) Ł Kubot (Austria) O Marach	6	4	[10]
(United States) J Isner (United States) S Querrey	1	6	[12]
(Sweden) R Lindstedt (Romania) H Tecău	2	1
WC	(Italy) S Bolelli (Italy) F Fognini	6	6

Semifinals
(United States) J Isner (United States) S Querrey	6	6
WC	(Italy) S Bolelli (Italy) F Fognini	4	3
