= 2012 Italian Open – Men's doubles =

Men's doubles
- 2012 Italian Open

Final
- Champions: (Spain) Marcel Granollers; (Spain) Marc López
- Runners-up: (Poland) Łukasz Kubot (Serbia) Janko Tipsarević
- Score: 6–3, 6–2

Events
Singles	men	women
Doubles	men	women
← 2011 ·	Italian Open	· 2013 →

John Isner and Sam Querrey were the defending champions but lost in the first round to Jürgen Melzer and Philipp Petzschner.
Marcel Granollers and Marc López won the title defeating Łukasz Kubot and Janko Tipsarević 6–3, 6–2 in the final.

== Seeds ==
All seeds receive a bye into the second round.

1. (Belarus) Max Mirnyi / (Canada) Daniel Nestor (quarterfinals)
2. (United States) Bob Bryan / (United States) Mike Bryan (quarterfinals)
3. (France) Michaël Llodra / (Serbia) Nenad Zimonjić (quarterfinals)
4. (Sweden) Robert Lindstedt / (Romania) Horia Tecău (semifinals)
5. (India) Leander Paes / (Czech Republic) Radek Štěpánek (second round)
6. (Poland) Mariusz Fyrstenberg / (Poland) Marcin Matkowski (quarterfinals)
7. (India) Mahesh Bhupathi / (India) Rohan Bopanna (semifinals)
8. (Austria) Alexander Peya / (Pakistan) Aisam-ul-Haq Qureshi (second round)

== Draw ==
=== Key ===
- Q = Qualifier
- WC = Wild card
- LL = Lucky loser
- Alt = Alternate
- SE = Special exempt
- PR = Protected ranking
- ITF = ITF entry
- JE = Junior exempt
- w/o = Walkover
- r = Retired
- d = Defaulted
- SR = Special ranking

=== Finals ===
Semifinals

Final

7
- (India) Mahesh Bhupathi
- (India) Rohan Bopanna
4
1

- (Spain) Marcel Granollers
- (Spain) Marc López
6
6

- (Spain) Marcel Granollers
- (Spain) Marc López
6
6

(Poland) Łukasz Kubot
(Serbia) Janko Tipsarević
3
2

4
- (Sweden) Robert Lindstedt
- (Romania) Horia Tecău
2
3

(Poland) Łukasz Kubot
(Serbia) Janko Tipsarević
6
6

=== Top half ===
First round

Second round

Quarterfinals

Semifinals

1
- (Belarus) M Mirnyi
- (Canada) D Nestor
6
3
[10]

WC
- (Italy) G Naso
- (Italy) F Volandri
7
6

WC
- (Italy) G Naso
- (Italy) F Volandri
3
6
[7]

- (Spain) D Ferrer
- (Spain) F López
5
4

1
- (Belarus) M Mirnyi
- (Canada) D Nestor
4
5

- (Finland) J Nieminen
- (Serbia) V Troicki
3
6
[3]

7
- (India) M Bhupathi
- (India) R Bopanna
6
7

- (Italy) D Bracciali
- (Italy) A Seppi
6
4
[10]

- (Italy) D Bracciali
- (Italy) A Seppi
2
1

7
- (India) M Bhupathi
- (India) R Bopanna
6
6

7
- (India) M Bhupathi
- (India) R Bopanna
4
1

- (Spain) M Granollers
- (Spain) M López
6
6

3
- (France) M Llodra
- (Serbia) N Zimonjić
w/o

- (Spain) D Marrero
- (Spain) F Verdasco
3
6^{4}

- (Spain) N Almagro
- (Spain) P Andújar

- (Spain) N Almagro
- (Spain) P Andújar
6
7^{7}

3
- (France) M Llodra
- (Serbia) N Zimonjić
4
2

- (Spain) M Granollers
- (Spain) M López
6
6

- (Spain) M Granollers
- (Spain) M López
6
6

- (Italy) S Bolelli
- (Italy) F Fognini
3
4

- (Spain) M Granollers
- (Spain) M López
7
7^{7}

8
- (Austria) A Peya
- (Pakistan) A-u-H Qureshi
5
6^{2}

=== Bottom half ===
First round

Second round

Quarterfinals

Semifinals

6
- (Poland) M Fyrstenberg
- (Poland) M Matkowski
6
3
[10]

- (United States) J Isner
- (United States) S Querrey
6
6^{7}
[5]

- (Austria) J Melzer
- (Germany) P Petzschner
3
6
[6]

- (Austria) J Melzer
- (Germany) P Petzschner
3
7^{9}
[10]

6
- (Poland) M Fyrstenberg
- (Poland) M Matkowski
2
6
[10]

- (Colombia) JS Cabal
- (Argentina) E Schwank
6
6

4
- (Sweden) R Lindstedt
- (Romania) H Tecău
6
1
[12]

- (Czech Republic) F Čermák
- (Slovakia) F Polášek
2
3

- (Colombia) JS Cabal
- (Argentina) E Schwank
4
3

4
- (Sweden) R Lindstedt
- (Romania) H Tecău
6
6

4
- (Sweden) R Lindstedt
- (Romania) H Tecău
2
3

(Poland) Ł Kubot
(Serbia) J Tipsarević
6
6

5
- (India) L Paes
- (Czech Republic) R Štěpánek
2
5

- (South Africa) K Anderson
- (Australia) B Tomic
4
6
[9]

(Poland) Ł Kubot
(Serbia) J Tipsarević
6
7

(Poland) Ł Kubot
(Serbia) J Tipsarević
6
4
[11]

(Poland) Ł Kubot
(Serbia) J Tipsarević
6
6

- (Mexico) S González
- (Germany) C Kas
1
6
[10]

2
- (United States) B Bryan
- (United States) M Bryan
4
4

WC
- (Italy) F Cipolla
- (Italy) P Lorenzi
6
3
[8]

- (Mexico) S González
- (Germany) C Kas
3
2

2
- (United States) B Bryan
- (United States) M Bryan
6
6
