= 2007 Family Circle Cup =

- Date: April 9–15
- Edition: 35th
- Category: WTA Tier I
- Draw: 56S / 28D
- Surface: Clay / outdoor
- Location: Charleston, South Carolina, U.S.
- Venue: Family Circle Tennis Center
- Attendance: 91,899

Champions

Singles
- (Serbia) Jelena Janković

Doubles
- (China) Yan Zi / (China) Zheng Jie
- Family Circle Cup

The 2007 Family Circle Cup was the 35th edition of the Family Circle Cup. This WTA Tier I Event was played on outdoor clay courts at the Family Circle Tennis Center in Charleston, South Carolina, United States.

Second-seeded Jelena Janković, who had already propelled herself to No. 2 in the WTA race, consolidated her position with her first win in a Tier I tournament.

== Finals ==
=== Singles ===
(Serbia) Jelena Janković defeated (Russia) Dinara Safina, 6–2, 6–2

- It was Janković's 2nd singles title of the year and the 3rd of her career.

=== Doubles ===
(China) Yan Zi / (China) Zheng Jie defeated (China) Peng Shuai / (China) Sun Tiantian, 7–5, 6–0

- It was Zi's 1st doubles title of the year and the 9th of her career. It was Jie's 1st doubles title of the year and the 9th of her career.
