= 2010 Polsat Warsaw Open – Singles Qualifying =

== Seeds ==
1. (Russia) Anna Chakvetadze (qualifying Competition)
2. (Uzbekistan) Akgul Amanmuradova (first round)
3. (Bulgaria) Tsvetana Pironkova (qualifier)
4. (United Kingdom) Anne Keothavong (qualifying Competition)
5. (Serbia) Bojana Jovanovski (qualifier)
6. (Hungary) Gréta Arn (qualifier)
7. (Romania) Irina-Camelia Begu (qualifier)
8. (Ukraine) Lesya Tsurenko (qualifying Competition)

== List of Qualifiers ==
- First qualifier: (Serbia) Bojana Jovanovski
- Second qualifier: (Romania) Irina-Camelia Begu
- Third qualifier: (Bulgaria) Tsvetana Pironkova
- Fourth qualifier: (Hungary) Gréta Arn

== Qualifying draw ==
=== First qualifier ===
First Round
1	(Russia) Anna Chakvetadze	6	6
WC	(Poland) Katarzyna Kawa	2	2
WC	(Poland) Magda Linette	6	6
WC	(Poland) Paula Kania	0	1
(Romania) Elena Bogdan	6	6
WC	(Poland) Olga Brózda	2	0
WC	(Poland) Klaudia Gawlik	1	0
5	(Serbia) Bojana Jovanovski	6	6

Second Round
1	(Russia) Anna Chakvetadze	6	4	6
WC	(Poland) Magda Linette	4	6	1
(Romania) Elena Bogdan	6^{4}	6	6^{3}
5	(Serbia) Bojana Jovanovski	7	3	7

Qualifying Competition
1	(Russia) Anna Chakvetadze	5	6^{4}
5	(Serbia) Bojana Jovanovski	7	7

=== Second qualifier ===
First Round
2	(Uzbekistan) Akgul Amanmuradova	2	6	1
WC	(South Africa) Natalie Grandin	6	3	6
WC	(Poland) Agata Barańska	3	4
WC	(Slovenia) Andreja Klepač	6	6
(Croatia) Ani Mijačika	2	6	6
WC	(Poland) Joanna Nalborska	6	4	1
(Slovakia) Lenka Wienerová	1	7	1
7	(Romania) Irina-Camelia Begu	6	6^{2}	6

Second Round
WC	(South Africa) Natalie Grandin	6	3	2
WC	(Slovenia) Andreja Klepač	2	6	6
(Croatia) Ani Mijačika	3	2
7	(Romania) Irina-Camelia Begu	6	6

Qualifying Competition
WC	(Slovenia) Andreja Klepač	7	2	4
7	(Romania) Irina-Camelia Begu	5	6	6

=== Third qualifier ===
First Round
3	(Bulgaria) Tsvetana Pironkova	6	6
(Ukraine) Anna Piven	1	3
WC	(Germany) Kim Grajdek	6	2	5
(Spain) Leticia Costas-Moreira	2	6	7
(Poland) Anna Korzeniak	1	6	6
(Poland) Karolina Kosińska	6	4	3
WC	(Poland) Alicja Rosolska	2	3
8	(Ukraine) Lesya Tsurenko	6	6

Second Round
3	(Bulgaria) Tsvetana Pironkova	7	6
(Spain) Leticia Costas-Moreira	5	1
(Poland) Anna Korzeniak	4	5
8	(Ukraine) Lesya Tsurenko	6	7

Qualifying Competition
3	(Bulgaria) Tsvetana Pironkova	6	7
8	(Ukraine) Lesya Tsurenko	1	5

=== Fourth qualifier ===
First Round
4	(United Kingdom) Anne Keothavong	6	6
WC	(Poland) Klaudia Jans	3	3
WC	(Poland) Joanna Sakowicz-Kostecka	2	1
(Belarus) Tatiana Poutchek	6	6
(United States) Abigail Spears	6	7
WC	(Chinese Taipei) Hsieh Su-wei	2	5
WC	(China) Yan Zi	1	2
6	(Hungary) Gréta Arn	6	6

Second Round
4	(United Kingdom) Anne Keothavong	6	6
(Belarus) Tatiana Poutchek	1	2
(United States) Abigail Spears	5	2
6	(Hungary) Gréta Arn	7	6

Qualifying Competition
4	(United Kingdom) Anne Keothavong	6	1	4
6	(Hungary) Gréta Arn	3	6	6
