= 2011 Italian Open – Men's singles =

Men's singles
- 2011 Italian Open

Final
- Champion: (Serbia) Novak Djokovic
- Runner-up: (Spain) Rafael Nadal
- Score: 6–4, 6–4

Events
Singles	men	women
Doubles	men	women
- Italian Open

Novak Djokovic defeated two-time defending champion Rafael Nadal in the final, 6–4, 6–4 to win the men's singles tennis title at the 2011 Italian Open. With the win, Djokovic logged his 39th consecutive match win, and extended his unbeaten streak in the 2011 season to 37–0. The final was a rematch of the 2009 final, won by Nadal.

== Seeds ==
The top eight seeds received a bye into the second round.

1. (Spain) Rafael Nadal (final)
2. (Serbia) Novak Djokovic (champion)
3. (Switzerland) Roger Federer (third round)
4. (United Kingdom) Andy Murray (semifinals)
5. (Sweden) Robin Söderling (quarterfinals)
6. (Spain) ~~David Ferrer~~ (withdrew due to illness)
7. (Czech Republic) Tomáš Berdych (quarterfinals)
8. (Austria) Jürgen Melzer (second round, retired due to back strain)
9. (Spain) Nicolás Almagro (third round)
10. (France) ~~Gaël Monfils~~ (withdrew due to sickness)
11. (United States) Mardy Fish (third round)
12. (United States) Andy Roddick (first round)
13. (Russia) Mikhail Youzhny (first round)
14. (Switzerland) Stanislas Wawrinka (third round)
15. (Serbia) Victor Troicki (second round)
16. (France) Richard Gasquet (semifinals)

== Draw ==
Key

- Q = Qualifier
- WC = Wild card
- LL = Lucky loser
- Alt = Alternate
- ITF = ITF entry
- PR = Protected ranking
- SR = Special ranking
- SE = Special exempt
- JE = Junior exempt
- JR = Junior Accelerator Programme entrant
- CO = College Accelerator Programme entrant
- NG = Next Gen Accelerator Program entrant
- w/o = Walkover
- r = Retired
- d = Defaulted

=== Finals ===
Quarterfinals
1	(Spain) Rafael Nadal	6	6
(Croatia) Marin Čilić	1	3
16	(France) Richard Gasquet	4	6	6
7	(Czech Republic) Tomáš Berdych	6	2	4
(Germany) Florian Mayer	6	1	1
4	(United Kingdom) Andy Murray	1	6	6
5	(Sweden) Robin Söderling	3	0
2	(Serbia) Novak Djokovic	6	6

Semifinals
1	(Spain) Rafael Nadal	7	6
16	(France) Richard Gasquet	5	1
4	(United Kingdom) Andy Murray	1	6	6^{2}
2	(Serbia) Novak Djokovic	6	3	7^{7}

Final
1	(Spain) Rafael Nadal	4	4
2	(Serbia) Novak Djokovic	6	6

=== Top half ===
==== Section 1 ====
First round
Q	(Italy) P Lorenzi	7^{7}	6
(Brazil) T Bellucci	6^{5}	3
(Spain) F López	7^{7}	6
(France) M Llodra	6^{2}	1
(Germany) P Kohlschreiber	6	6
13	(Russia) M Youzhny	4	2
11	(United States) M Fish	4	6	6
(Colombia) S Giraldo	6	2	2
(Croatia) I Ljubičić	6	6
WC	(Italy) F Cipolla	2	3
(Croatia) M Čilić	6	1
PR	(Croatia) I Karlović	4	0^{r}

Second round
1	(Spain) R Nadal	6^{5}	6	6
Q	(Italy) P Lorenzi	7^{7}	4	0
(Spain) F López	6	3	6
(Germany) P Kohlschreiber	4	6	3
11	(United States) M Fish	7^{7}	5	6
(Croatia) I Ljubičić	6^{2}	7	2
(Croatia) M Čilić	6	6
LL	(Argentina) C Berlocq	4	3

Third round
1	(Spain) R Nadal	6	6
(Spain) F López	4	2
11	(United States) M Fish	6^{6}	3
(Croatia) M Čilić	7^{8}	6

Quarterfinals
1	(Spain) R Nadal	6	6
(Croatia) M Čilić	1	3

==== Section 2 ====
First round
(Cyprus) M Baghdatis	3	2
(France) J-W Tsonga	6	6
Q	(Russia) I Andreev	6	7
Q	(Spain) P Riba	4	5
(Spain) A Montañés	2	3
16	(France) R Gasquet	6	6
LL	(France) A Mannarino	5	6	3
LL	(Finland) J Nieminen	7	2	6
Q	(Romania) V Hănescu	3	6	6^{6}
(Ukraine) S Stakhovsky	6	1	7^{8}
(Argentina) J Mónaco	6	4	6
(Italy) A Seppi	1	6	2

Second round
3	(Switzerland) R Federer	6	6
(France) J-W Tsonga	4	2
Q	(Russia) I Andreev	1	2
16	(France) R Gasquet	6	6
LL	(Finland) J Nieminen	6^{5}	6	6
(Ukraine) S Stakhovsky	7^{7}	3	4
(Argentina) J Mónaco	2	2
7	(Czech Republic) T Berdych	6	6

Third round
3	(Switzerland) R Federer	6	6^{2}	6^{4}
16	(France) R Gasquet	4	7^{7}	7^{7}
LL	(Finland) J Nieminen	2	7^{7}	2
7	(Czech Republic) T Berdych	6	6^{4}	6

Quarterfinals
16	(France) R Gasquet	4	6	6
7	(Czech Republic) T Berdych	6	2	4

=== Bottom half ===
==== Section 3 ====
First round
(Germany) F Mayer	6	6
(Kazakhstan) A Golubev	4	3
(Argentina) JI Chela	6	6
(United States) J Isner	4	1
(France) G Simon	6	6
12	(United States) A Roddick	3	3
15	(Serbia) V Troicki	6	7
(Russia) N Davydenko	4	5
(Italy) P Starace	6	6
(Ukraine) A Dolgopolov	3	3
(Belgium) X Malisse	7	6
(Spain) G García López	5	2

Second round
8	(Austria) J Melzer	4^{r}
(Germany) F Mayer	6
(Argentina) JI Chela	6	6
(France) G Simon	4	2
15	(Serbia) V Troicki	4	4
(Italy) P Starace	6	6
(Belgium) X Malisse	2	6	3
4	(United Kingdom) A Murray	6	2	6

Third round
(Germany) F Mayer	7	6
(Argentina) JI Chela	5	4
(Italy) P Starace	2	3
4	(United Kingdom) A Murray	6	6

Quarterfinals
(Germany) F Mayer	6	1	1
4	(United Kingdom) A Murray	1	6	6

==== Section 4 ====
First round
(Spain) F Verdasco	6	6
(Canada) M Raonic	4	4
(South Africa) K Anderson	6^{1}	0^{r}
(United States) S Querrey	7^{7}	1
WC	(Italy) S Bolelli	0	5
9	(Spain) N Almagro	6	7
14	(Switzerland) S Wawrinka	6^{5}	6	6
WC	(Italy) F Fognini	7^{7}	2	4
WC	(Italy) F Volandri	6	6
(Netherlands) T de Bakker	1	2
Q	(Uruguay) P Cuevas	6^{1}	6	2
Q	(Poland) Ł Kubot	7^{7}	2	6

Second round
5	(Sweden) R Söderling	2	7	6
(Spain) F Verdasco	6	5	4
(United States) S Querrey	3	6^{4}
9	(Spain) N Almagro	6	7^{7}
14	(Switzerland) S Wawrinka	6	3	6
WC	(Italy) F Volandri	1	6	2
Q	(Poland) Ł Kubot	0	3
2	(Serbia) N Djokovic	6	6

Third round
5	(Sweden) R Söderling	6	3	6
9	(Spain) N Almagro	3	6	4
14	(Switzerland) S Wawrinka	4	1
2	(Serbia) N Djokovic	6	6

Quarterfinals
5	(Sweden) R Söderling	3	0
2	(Serbia) N Djokovic	6	6
