= 2011 Italian Open – Women's doubles =

Women's doubles
- 2011 Italian Open

Final
- Champions: (China) Peng Shuai (China) Zheng Jie
- Runners-up: (United States) Vania King (Kazakhstan) Yaroslava Shvedova
- Score: 6–2, 6–3

Details
- Draw: 28
- Seeds: 8

Events
Singles	men	women
Doubles	men	women
← 2010 ·	Italian Open	· 2012 →

Gisela Dulko and Flavia Pennetta were the defending champions, but they lost to Alexandra Dulgheru and Jarmila Gajdošová in the quarterfinals.
Chinese pair Peng Shuai and Zheng Jie won the title beating No. 3 seeds Vania King and Yaroslava Shvedova in the final 6–2, 6–3. Peng Shuai had won the title earlier in 2010 Internazionali BNL d'Italia – Women's doubles

== Seeds ==
The top four seeds received a bye into the second round.

1. (Argentina) Gisela Dulko / (Italy) Flavia Pennetta (quarterfinals)
2. (Czech Republic) Květa Peschke / (Slovenia) Katarina Srebotnik (semifinals)
3. (United States) Vania King / (Kazakhstan) Yaroslava Shvedova (final)
4. (United States) Liezel Huber / (United States) Lisa Raymond (second round)
5. (Russia) Maria Kirilenko / (Russia) Elena Vesnina (first round, retired due to Kirilenko's viral infection)
6. (United States) Bethanie Mattek-Sands / (United States) Meghann Shaughnessy (quarterfinals)
7. (Czech Republic) Iveta Benešová / (Czech Republic) Barbora Záhlavová-Strýcová (second round)
8. (Spain) María José Martínez Sánchez / (Spain) Anabel Medina Garrigues (quarterfinals)

== Draw ==
=== Key ===
- Q = Qualifier
- WC = Wild card
- LL = Lucky loser
- Alt = Alternate
- ITF = ITF entry
- PR = Protected ranking
- SR = Special ranking
- SE = Special exempt
- JE = Junior exempt
- JR = Junior Accelerator Programme entrant
- CO = College Accelerator Programme entrant
- NG = Next Gen Accelerator Program entrant
- w/o = Walkover
- r = Retired
- d = Defaulted

=== Finals ===
Semi-finals
Alt	(Romania) Alexandra Dulgheru (Australia) Jarmila Gajdošová	6	4	[5]
(China) Peng Shuai (China) Zheng Jie	3	6	[10]
3	(United States) Vania King (Kazakhstan) Yaroslava Shvedova	7	6
2	(Czech Republic) Květa Peschke (Slovenia) Katarina Srebotnik	6^{4}	2

Final
(China) Peng Shuai (China) Zheng Jie	6	6
3	(United States) Vania King (Kazakhstan) Yaroslava Shvedova	2	3

=== Top half ===
First round
(Ukraine) K Bondarenko (Russia) A Kudryavtseva	2	2
(Russia) V Dushevina (Belarus) T Poutchek	6	6
(Chinese Taipei) C-j Chuang (Belarus) O Govortsova	5	2
Alt	(Romania) A Dulgheru (Australia) J Gajdošová	7	6
(Israel) S Pe'er (Turkey) İ Şenoğlu	2
5	(Russia) M Kirilenko (Russia) E Vesnina	3	r
(China) S Peng (China) J Zheng	6	6
(South Africa) N Grandin (Czech Republic) V Uhlířová	2	4
Alt	(Croatia) M Lučić (South Africa) C Scheepers	0	3
(Italy) A Brianti (Slovenia) P Hercog	6	6
(Chinese Taipei) S-w Hsieh (China) Z Yan	4	2
8	(Spain) MJ Martínez Sánchez (Spain) A Medina Garrigues	6	6

Second round
1	(Argentina) G Dulko (Italy) F Pennetta	6	6
(Russia) V Dushevina (Belarus) T Poutchek	4	3
Alt	(Romania) A Dulgheru (Australia) J Gajdošová	6^{6}	7	[10]
(Israel) S Pe'er (Turkey) İ Şenoğlu	7	5	[6]
4	(United States) L Huber (United States) L Raymond	5	5
(China) S Peng (China) J Zheng	7	7
(Italy) A Brianti (Slovenia) P Hercog	6	2	[5]
8	(Spain) MJ Martínez Sánchez (Spain) A Medina Garrigues	2	6	[10]

Quarter-finals
1	(Argentina) G Dulko (Italy) F Pennetta	6^{6}	4
Alt	(Romania) A Dulgheru (Australia) J Gajdošová	7	6
(China) S Peng (China) J Zheng	6	6
8	(Spain) MJ Martínez Sánchez (Spain) A Medina Garrigues	3	4

Semi-finals
Alt	(Romania) A Dulgheru (Australia) J Gajdošová	6	4	[5]
(China) S Peng (China) J Zheng	3	6	[10]

=== Bottom half ===
First round
7	(Czech Republic) I Benešová (Czech Republic) B Záhlavová-Strýcová	6	6
(Spain) N Llagostera Vives (Spain) A Parra Santonja	2	2
(Russia) N Petrova (Australia) A Rodionova	6	3	[10]
(Greece) E Daniilidou (Germany) J Wöhr	3	6	[4]
(Russia) M Kondratieva (France) S Lefèvre	6^{6}	6	[6]
WC	(Italy) N Burnett (Russia) R Kulikova	7	3	[10]
6	(United States) B Mattek-Sands (United States) M Shaughnessy	6	6
WC	(Italy) C Dentoni (Italy) R Oprandi	0	0
(United States) R Kops-Jones (United States) A Spears	6	4	[14]
(Poland) K Jans (Poland) A Rosolska	1	6	[12]
(Slovakia) D Hantuchová (Poland) A Radwańska	6	6
(Australia) C Dellacqua (Australia) R Stubbs	0	3

Second round
7	(Czech Republic) I Benešová (Czech Republic) B Záhlavová-Strýcová	3	0
(Russia) N Petrova (Australia) A Rodionova	6	6
WC	(Italy) N Burnett (Russia) R Kulikova	3	0
3	(United States) V King (Kazakhstan) Y Shvedova	6	6
6	(United States) B Mattek-Sands (United States) M Shaughnessy	6	6
(United States) R Kops-Jones (United States) A Spears	4	3
(Slovakia) D Hantuchová (Poland) A Radwańska	3	2
2	(Czech Republic) K Peschke (Slovenia) K Srebotnik	6	6

Quarter-finals
(Russia) N Petrova (Australia) A Rodionova	6^{4}	4
3	(United States) V King (Kazakhstan) Y Shvedova	7	6
6	(United States) B Mattek-Sands (United States) M Shaughnessy	2	6^{4}
2	(Czech Republic) K Peschke (Slovenia) K Srebotnik	6	7

Semi-finals
3	(United States) V King (Kazakhstan) Y Shvedova	7	6
2	(Czech Republic) K Peschke (Slovenia) K Srebotnik	6^{4}	2
