= 2011 Italian Open – Women's singles =

Women's singles
- 2011 Italian Open

Final
- Champion: (Russia) Maria Sharapova
- Runner-up: (Australia) Samantha Stosur
- Score: 6–2, 6–4

Details
- Draw: 56
- Seeds: 16

Events
Singles	men	women
Doubles	men	women
← 2010 ·	Italian Open	· 2012 →

Maria Sharapova defeated Samantha Stosur in the final, 6–2, 6–4 to win the women's singles tennis title at the 2011 Italian Open. It was her 23rd career title, and her first in almost a year.

María José Martínez Sánchez was the defending champion, but lost in the first round to Ekaterina Makarova.

== Seeds ==
The top eight seeds receive a bye into the second round.

1. (Denmark) Caroline Wozniacki (semifinals)
2. (Italy) Francesca Schiavone (quarterfinals)
3. (Belarus) Victoria Azarenka (quarterfinals, retired due to a right elbow contusion)
4. (China) Li Na (semifinals)
5. (Serbia) Jelena Janković (quarterfinals)
6. (Australia) Samantha Stosur (final)
7. (Russia) Maria Sharapova (champion)
8. (Poland) Agnieszka Radwańska (second round)
9. (France) Marion Bartoli (second round)
10. (Israel) Shahar Pe'er (third round)
11. (Russia) Svetlana Kuznetsova (first round)
12. (Germany) Andrea Petkovic (second round)
13. (Serbia) Ana Ivanovic (second round)
14. (Estonia) Kaia Kanepi (first round)
15. (Italy) Flavia Pennetta (first round)
16. (Russia) Anastasia Pavlyuchenkova (third round)

== Draw ==
=== Key ===
- Q = Qualifier
- WC = Wild card
- LL = Lucky loser
- Alt = Alternate
- ITF = ITF entry
- PR = Protected ranking
- SR = Special ranking
- SE = Special exempt
- JE = Junior exempt
- JR = Junior Accelerator Programme entrant
- CO = College Accelerator Programme entrant
- NG = Next Gen Accelerator Program entrant
- w/o = Walkover
- r = Retired
- d = Defaulted

=== Finals ===
Quarterfinals
1	(Denmark) Caroline Wozniacki	6	1	6
5	(Serbia) Jelena Janković	3	6	3
3	(Belarus) Victoria Azarenka	6	0^{r}
7	(Russia) Maria Sharapova	4	3
(Hungary) Gréta Arn	3	1
4	(China) Li Na	6	6
6	(Australia) Samantha Stosur	6	6
2	(Italy) Francesca Schiavone	2	4

Semifinals
1	(Denmark) Caroline Wozniacki	5	3
7	(Russia) Maria Sharapova	7	6
4	(China) Li Na	6^{6}	0
6	(Australia) Samantha Stosur	7^{8}	6

Final
7	(Russia) Maria Sharapova	6	6
6	(Australia) Samantha Stosur	2	4

=== Top half ===
==== Section 1 ====
First round
Q	(Australia) A Rodionova	6	6
(Kazakhstan) Y Shvedova	4	4
(Belgium) Y Wickmayer	4	6	6
LL	(Germany) A Kerber	6	3	3
(Russia) N Petrova	0	0	r
13	(Serbia) A Ivanovic	6	3
9	(France) M Bartoli	6	6
Q	(Spain) A Parra Santonja	2	3
Q	(Spain) A Medina Garrigues	6	6
(Switzerland) P Schnyder	3	2
(Japan) K Date-Krumm	5	2
(Czech Republic) L Šafářová	7	6

Second round
1	(Denmark) C Wozniacki	6	6
Q	(Australia) A Rodionova	2	0
(Belgium) Y Wickmayer	2	7^{7}	6
13	(Serbia) A Ivanovic	6	6^{4}	3
9	(France) M Bartoli	4	3
Q	(Spain) A Medina Garrigues	6	6
(Czech Republic) L Šafářová	0	3
5	(Serbia) J Janković	6	6

Third round
1	(Denmark) C Wozniacki	6	7^{7}
(Belgium) Y Wickmayer	1	6^{4}
Q	(Spain) A Medina Garrigues	4	6	2
5	(Serbia) J Janković	6	2	6

Quarterfinals
1	(Denmark) C Wozniacki	6	1	6
5	(Serbia) J Janković	3	6	3

==== Section 2 ====
First round
(Italy) S Errani	6	1
(Italy) R Vinci	2	0	r
(Japan) A Morita	3	1
(Russia) V Dushevina	6	6
Q	(South Africa) C Scheepers	3	5
16	(Russia) A Pavlyuchenkova	6	7
10	(Israel) S Pe'er	3	6	6
(Serbia) B Jovanovski	6	0	4
(Russia) A Kleybanova	6	6
Q	(United States) V Lepchenko	2	2
(Spain) MJ Martínez Sánchez	0	7	4
(Russia) E Makarova	6	5	6

Second round
3	(Belarus) V Azarenka	6	6
(Italy) S Errani	1	2
(Russia) V Dushevina	5	4
16	(Russia) A Pavlyuchenkova	7	6
10	(Israel) S Pe'er	6	7
(Russia) A Kleybanova	3	5
(Russia) E Makarova	1	1
7	(Russia) M Sharapova	6	6

Third round
3	(Belarus) V Azarenka	6	4	6
16	(Russia) A Pavlyuchenkova	4	6	2
10	(Israel) S Pe'er	2	2
7	(Russia) M Sharapova	6	6

Quarterfinals
3	(Belarus) V Azarenka	6	0^{r}
7	(Russia) M Sharapova	4	3

=== Bottom half ===
==== Section 3 ====
First round
Q	(Austria) T Paszek	4	4
(Russia) E Vesnina	6	6
WC	(Italy) A Brianti	6	7
LL	(China) J Zheng	4	5
(Hungary) G Arn	3	7^{7}	7^{11}
11	(Russia) S Kuznetsova	6	6^{4}	6^{9}
15	(Italy) F Pennetta	4	6	3
(United States) B Mattek-Sands	6	4	6
WC	(Italy) C Dentoni	1	2
(Australia) J Gajdošová	6	6
(Czech Republic) B Záhlavová-Strýcová	1	6	6^{4}
(Spain) L Domínguez Lino	6	0	7^{7}

Second round
8	(Poland) A Radwańska	6	2	1
(Russia) E Vesnina	3	6	6
WC	(Italy) A Brianti	4	4
(Hungary) G Arn	6	6
(United States) B Mattek-Sands	2	4
(Australia) J Gajdošová	6	6
(Spain) L Domínguez Lino	4	2
4	(China) N Li	6	6

Third round
(Russia) E Vesnina	6	6^{3}	6^{3}
(Hungary) G Arn	3	7^{7}	7^{7}
(Australia) J Gajdošová	2	1
4	(China) N Li	6	6

Quarterfinals
(Hungary) G Arn	3	1
4	(China) N Li	6	6	-

==== Section 4 ====
First round
(Czech Republic) I Benešová	6	6
(Argentina) G Dulko	2	1
Q	(Slovenia) P Hercog	6	7
(Romania) A Dulgheru	1	5
(Russia) M Kirilenko	5	1
12	(Germany) A Petkovic	7	6
14	(Estonia) K Kanepi	5	6	1
WC	(Italy) R Oprandi	7	3	6
(Bulgaria) T Pironkova	4	2
(Slovakia) D Hantuchová	6	6
Q	(United States) C McHale	6	2	7^{9}
(China) S Peng	3	6	6^{7}

Second round
6	(Australia) S Stosur	6	7	-
(Czech Republic) I Benešová	1	5
Q	(Slovenia) P Hercog	6	6
12	(Germany) A Petkovic	4	3
WC	(Italy) R Oprandi	5	1
(Slovakia) D Hantuchová	7	6
Q	(United States) C McHale	3	1
2	(Italy) F Schiavone	6	6

Third round
6	(Australia) S Stosur	6	6
Q	(Slovenia) P Hercog	3	4
(Slovakia) D Hantuchová	6	2	5
2	(Italy) F Schiavone	3	6	7

Quarterfinals
6	(Australia) S Stosur	6	6
2	(Italy) F Schiavone	2	4
