= 2007 Family Circle Cup – Singles =

Singles
- 2007 Family Circle Cup

Final
- Champion: (Serbia) Jelena Janković
- Runner-up: (Russia) Dinara Safina
- Score: 6–2, 6–2

Details
- Draw: 56
- Seeds: 16

Events
Singles	Doubles
- Family Circle Cup

Jelena Janković defeated Dinara Safina in the final, 6–2, 6–2 to win the singles tennis title at the 2007 Family Circle Cup.

Nadia Petrova was the reigning champion, but she chose not to participate.

== Seeds ==
The top 8 seeds received a bye into the second round.

1. (Czech Republic) Nicole Vaidišová (second round)
2. (Serbia) Jelena Janković (champion)
3. (United States) Serena Williams (second round)
4. (Russia) Dinara Safina (final)
5. (Israel) Shahar Pe'er (second round)
6. (Switzerland) Patty Schnyder (second round)
7. (Serbia) Ana Ivanovic (third round)
8. (China) Li Na (third round)
9. (Russia) Vera Zvonareva (semifinals)
10. (France) Tatiana Golovin (quarterfinals)
11. (Italy) Francesca Schiavone (second round)
12. (Slovenia) Katarina Srebotnik (quarterfinals)
13. (France) Marion Bartoli (second round)
14. (Australia) Samantha Stosur (first round)
15. (Austria) Sybille Bammer (third round)
16. (Italy) Mara Santangelo (third round)

== Draw ==
=== Finals ===
Quarterfinals
WC	(Netherlands) Michaëlla Krajicek	1	5
9	(Russia) Vera Zvonareva	6	7
4	(Russia) Dinara Safina	6	0
10	(France) Tatiana Golovin	3	0^{r}
(Spain) Anabel Medina Garrigues	4	5
(United States) Venus Williams	6	7
12	(Slovenia) Katarina Srebotnik	2	0
2	(Serbia) Jelena Janković	6	6

Semifinals
9	(Russia) Vera Zvonareva	3	1^{r}
4	(Russia) Dinara Safina	6	0
(United States) Venus Williams	6	3	6^{5}
2	(Serbia) Jelena Janković	3	6	7

Finals
4	(Russia) Dinara Safina	2	2
2	(Serbia) Jelena Janković	6	6

=== Section 1 ===
First round
(Russia) A Jidkova	4	0
WC	(Netherlands) M Krajicek	6	0
(France) V Razzano	6	6
(United States) M Shaughnessy	3	4
(Australia) A Molik	3	1
15	(Austria) S Bammer	6	6
9	(Russia) V Zvonareva	6	6
(France) N Dechy	4	4
(United States) M Tu	7	6
(Italy) F Pennetta	5	4
LL	(Germany) J Schruff	6	4	4
(Argentina) G Dulko	1	6	6

Second round
1	(Czech Republic) N Vaidišová	6	4	3
WC	(Netherlands) M Krajicek	4	6	6
(France) V Razzano	0	0^{r}
15	(Austria) S Bammer	6	3
9	(Russia) V Zvonareva	6	6
(United States) M Tu	1	3
(Argentina) G Dulko	0	7	4
7	(Serbia) A Ivanovic	6	6^{5}	6

Third round
WC	(Netherlands) M Krajicek	6^{4}	6	6
15	(Austria) S Bammer	7	2	1
9	(Russia) V Zvonareva	6	6
7	(Serbia) A Ivanovic	3	3

Quarterfinals
WC	(Netherlands) M Krajicek	1	5
9	(Russia) V Zvonareva	6	7

=== Section 2 ===
First round
(Greece) E Daniilidou	3	7	6
(Italy) R Oprandi	6	6^{5}	4
(United States) V King	1	4
(Spain) L Domínguez Lino	6	6
(United States) S Perry	7	4	1
13	(France) M Bartoli	5	6	6
10	(France) T Golovin	6	6
Q	(Slovakia) D Cibulková	4	1
(Croatia) J Kostanić Tošić	6^{3}	2
(United States) J Craybas	7	6
(China) S Peng	7	6
Q	(Czech Republic) B Záhlavová-Strýcová	5	1

Second round
4	(Russia) D Safina	6	6
(Greece) E Daniilidou	3	4
(Spain) L Domínguez Lino	6	6
13	(France) M Bartoli	3	2
10	(France) T Golovin	6	6
(United States) J Craybas	0	1
(China) S Peng	1	6	6
6	(Switzerland) P Schnyder	6	3	3

Third round
4	(Russia) D Safina	6	6
(Spain) L Domínguez Lino	2	2
10	(France) T Golovin	6	4	6
(China) S Peng	2	6	3

Quarterfinals
4	(Russia) D Safina	6	0
10	(France) T Golovin	3	0^{r}

=== Section 3 ===
First round
(Australia) N Pratt	2	6	6
Q	(Uzbekistan) V Lepchenko	6	2	2
(Germany) M Müller	3	6^{4}
(Spain) A Medina Garrigues	6	7
(Spain) V Ruano Pascual	2	0^{r}
11	(Italy) F Schiavone	6	2
14	(Australia) S Stosur	2	2
(United States) V Williams	6	6
(Russia) V Bardina	1	6	6
(Russia) E Vesnina	6	3	1
(France) S Brémond	2	3
Q	(Chinese Taipei) Y-j Chan	6	6

Second round
8	(China) N Li	6	6
(Australia) N Pratt	1	4
(Spain) A Medina Garrigues	2	6	6
11	(Italy) F Schiavone	6	4	2
(United States) V Williams	6	6
(Russia) V Bardina	2	1
Q	(Chinese Taipei) Y-j Chan	5
3	(United States) S Williams	3^{r}

Third round
8	(China) N Li	4	5
(Spain) A Medina Garrigues	6	7
(United States) V Williams	6	6
Q	(Chinese Taipei) Y-j Chan	2	1

Quarterfinals
(Spain) A Medina Garrigues	4	5
(United States) V Williams	6	7

=== Section 4 ===
First round
Q	(Ukraine) Y Fedak	4	1
(China) J Zheng	6	6
(France) A Rezaï	6	7
Q	(Russia) V Dushevina	1	5
WC	(Ukraine) J Vakulenko	6	2	4
12	(Slovenia) K Srebotnik	1	6	6
16	(Italy) M Santangelo	7	6
(Thailand) T Tanasugarn	5	1
WC	(United States) A Harkleroad	2	7	6
(United States) L Granville	6	5	2
(Czech Republic) E Birnerová	4	7	5
(Russia) An Rodionova	6	6^{5}	7

Second round
5	(Israel) S Pe'er	2	3
(China) J Zheng	6	6
(France) A Rezaï	6^{3}	6	5
12	(Slovenia) K Srebotnik	7	3	7
16	(Italy) M Santangelo	6	6
WC	(United States) A Harkleroad	2	0
(Russia) An Rodionova	1	1
2	(Serbia) J Janković	6	6

Third round
(China) J Zheng	5	6^{5}
12	(Slovenia) K Srebotnik	7	7
16	(Italy) M Santangelo	3	0
2	(Serbia) J Janković	6	6

Quarterfinals
12	(Slovenia) K Srebotnik	2	0
2	(Serbia) J Janković	6	6
