= 2007 Family Circle Cup – Doubles =

Doubles
- 2007 Family Circle Cup

Final
- Champion: (China) Yan Zi (China) Zheng Jie
- Runner-up: (China) Peng Shuai (China) Sun Tiantian
- Score: 7-5, 6-0

Details
- Draw: 28
- Seeds: 8

Events
Singles	Doubles
- Family Circle Cup

Lisa Raymond and Samantha Stosur were the defending champions, but lost to Peng Shuai and Sun Tiantian in the second round.

== Seeds ==
1. (United States) Lisa Raymond / (Australia) Samantha Stosur (second round)
2. (Zimbabwe) Cara Black / (South Africa) Liezel Huber (semifinals)
3. (China) Yan Zi / (China) Zheng Jie (champions)
4. (Russia) Dinara Safina / (Slovenia) Katarina Srebotnik (quarterfinals, retired due to Safina's left wrist injury)
5. (Chinese Taipei) Chan Yung-jan / (Chinese Taipei) Chuang Chia-jung (first round)
6. (United States) Vania King / (Australia) Rennae Stubbs (second round)
7. (Spain) Anabel Medina Garrigues / (Spain) Virginia Ruano Pascual (first round)
8. (France) Nathalie Dechy / (Russia) Vera Zvonareva (quarterfinals, retired due to Zvonareva's left wrist injury)

* The top four seeds received a bye in the first round.

== Draw ==
Key

- Q = Qualifier
- WC = Wild card
- LL = Lucky loser
- Alt = Alternate
- ITF = ITF entry
- PR = Protected ranking
- SR = Special ranking
- SE = Special exempt
- JE = Junior exempt
- JR = Junior Accelerator Programme entrant
- CO = College Accelerator Programme entrant
- NG = Next Gen Accelerator Program entrant
- w/o = Walkover
- r = Retired
- d = Defaulted

=== Final ===
Semifinals
(China) Peng Shuai (China) Sun Tiantian	4	7	6
(Argentina) Gisela Dulko (Italy) Flavia Pennetta	6	5	2
3	(China) Yan Zi (China) Zheng Jie	6	6
2	(Zimbabwe) Cara Black (South Africa) Liezel Huber	0	4

Final
(China) Peng Shuai (China) Sun Tiantian	5	0
3	(China) Yan Zi (China) Zheng Jie	7	6

=== Earlier rounds ===
==== Top half ====
First round
(China) S Peng (China) T Sun	6	5	6
(Slovakia) J Husárová (United States) M Shaughnessy	2	7	1
(United States) J Craybas (Russia) A Jidkova	4	2
(United States) A Harkleroad (United States) B Mattek	6	6
(Czech Republic) E Birnerová (Czech Republic) B Záhlavová-Strýcová	0	7^{7}	3
8	(France) N Dechy (Russia) V Zvonareva	6	6^{3}	6
(Greece) E Daniilidou (Germany) J Wöhr	3	2
(United States) L Granville (Croatia) J Kostanić Tošić	6	6
(Russia) V Dushevina (Russia) E Vesnina	6	6
WC	(United States) A Rolle (United States) A Spears	2	3
(Argentina) G Dulko (Italy) F Pennetta	1	6	6
7	(Spain) A Medina Garrigues (Spain) V Ruano Pascual	6	4	4

Second round
1	(United States) L Raymond (Australia) S Stosur	3	6	3
(China) S Peng (China) T Sun	6	2	6
(United States) A Harkleroad (United States) B Mattek	2	6^{2}
8	(France) N Dechy (Russia) V Zvonareva	6	7^{7}
4	(Russia) D Safina (Slovenia) K Srebotnik	7^{7}	7
(United States) L Granville (Croatia) J Kostanić Tošić	6^{1}	5
(Russia) V Dushevina (Russia) E Vesnina	2	4
(Argentina) G Dulko (Italy) F Pennetta	6	6

Quarterfinals
(China) S Peng (China) T Sun	w/o
8	(France) N Dechy (Russia) V Zvonareva
4	(Russia) D Safina (Slovenia) K Srebotnik
(Argentina) G Dulko (Italy) F Pennetta	w/o

Semifinals
(China) S Peng (China) T Sun	4	7	6
(Argentina) G Dulko (Italy) F Pennetta	6	5	2

==== Bottom half ====
First round
5	(Chinese Taipei) Y-j Chan (Chinese Taipei) C-j Chuang	1	6	4
(Australia) A Molik (Italy) M Santangelo	6	4	6
WC	(Israel) T Obziler (Israel) S Pe'er	3	2
(Spain) L Domínguez Lino (Netherlands) M Krajicek	6	6
WC	(United States) C Morariu (Switzerland) P Schnyder	6	7
(Romania) A Ehritt-Vanc (Russia) A Rodionova	3	5
6	(United States) V King (Australia) R Stubbs	6	6
(Ukraine) Y Fedak (Ukraine) T Perebiynis	1	2
(Slovakia) J Gajdošová (Czech Republic) V Uhlířová	4	7	4
(Australia) N Pratt (Australia) B Stewart	6	5	6
(Russia) A Kudryavtseva (Germany) M Müller	7	6
(France) M Bartoli (United States) M Tu	5	4

Second round
(Australia) A Molik (Italy) M Santangelo	1	6	6
(Spain) L Domínguez Lino (Netherlands) M Krajicek	6	3	1
WC	(United States) C Morariu (Switzerland) P Schnyder	2	7^{10}	1
3	(China) Z Yan (China) J Zheng	6	6^{8}	6
6	(United States) V King (Australia) R Stubbs	5	6	6^{6}
(Australia) N Pratt (Australia) B Stewart	7	2	7^{8}
(Russia) A Kudryavtseva (Germany) M Müller	3	3
2	(Zimbabwe) C Black (South Africa) L Huber	6	6

Quarterfinals
(Australia) A Molik (Italy) M Santangelo	6	3	1
3	(China) Z Yan (China) J Zheng	3	6	6
(Australia) N Pratt (Australia) B Stewart	0	3
2	(Zimbabwe) C Black (South Africa) L Huber	6	6

Semifinals
3	(China) Z Yan (China) J Zheng	6	6
2	(Zimbabwe) C Black (South Africa) L Huber	0	4
