= 2012 Italian Open – Women's singles =

Women's singles
- 2012 Italian Open

Final
- Champion: (Russia) Maria Sharapova
- Runner-up: (China) Li Na
- Score: 4–6, 6–4, 7–6^{(7–5)}

Details
- Draw: 56
- Seeds: 16

Events
Singles	men	women
Doubles	men	women
← 2011 ·	Italian Open	· 2013 →

Defending champion Maria Sharapova defeated Li Na in the final, 4–6, 6–4, 7–6^{(7–5)} to win the women's singles tennis title at the 2012 Italian Open. She came back from a set and a double break deficit in the second set of the final, and saved a championship point in the third set.

== Seeds ==
The top eight seeds receive a bye into the second round.

1. (Belarus) Victoria Azarenka (third round, withdrew because of a shoulder injury)
2. (Russia) Maria Sharapova (champion)
3. (Poland) Agnieszka Radwańska (second round)
4. (Czech Republic) Petra Kvitová (quarterfinals)
5. (Australia) Samantha Stosur (third round)
6. (Denmark) Caroline Wozniacki (second round, retired)
7. (France) Marion Bartoli (second round)
8. (China) Li Na (final)
9. (United States) Serena Williams (semifinal, withdrew due to a lower back injury)
10. (Italy) Francesca Schiavone (first round)
11. (Germany) Sabine Lisicki (first round)
12. (Germany) Angelique Kerber (semifinals)
13. (Serbia) Ana Ivanovic (third round)
14. (Slovakia) Dominika Cibulková (quarterfinals)
15. (Serbia) Jelena Janković (first round)
16. (Russia) Maria Kirilenko (first round)

Click on the seed number of a player to go to their draw section.

== Draw ==
=== Key ===
- Q = Qualifier
- WC = Wild card
- LL = Lucky loser
- Alt = Alternate
- ITF = ITF entry
- PR = Protected ranking
- SR = Special ranking
- SE = Special exempt
- JE = Junior exempt
- JR = Junior Accelerator Programme entrant
- CO = College Accelerator Programme entrant
- NG = Next Gen Accelerator Program entrant
- w/o = Walkover
- r = Retired
- d = Defaulted

=== Finals ===
Quarterfinals
14	(Slovakia) Dominika Cibulková	1	6^{4}
8	(China) Li Na	6	7^{7}
(Italy) Flavia Pennetta	0^{r}
9	(United States) Serena Williams	4
12	(Germany) Angelique Kerber	7^{7}	1	6
4	(Czech Republic) Petra Kvitová	6^{2}	6	1
WC	(United States) Venus Williams	4	3
2	(Russia) Maria Sharapova	6	6

Semifinals
8	(China) Li Na	w/o
9	(United States) Serena Williams
12	(Germany) Angelique Kerber	3	4
2	(Russia) Maria Sharapova	6	6

Final
8	(China) Li Na	6	4	6^{5}
2	(Russia) Maria Sharapova	4	6	7^{7}

=== Top half ===
==== Section 1 ====
First round
(Israel) S Pe'er	7^{7}	4	3
(China) S Peng	6^{4}	6	1^{r}
(Italy) R Vinci	4	6	2
WC	(Italy) K Knapp	6	2	6
Q	(Croatia) M Lučić	1	2
14	(Slovakia) D Cibulková	6	6
11	(Germany) S Lisicki	6^{4}	6	3
(New Zealand) M Erakovic	7^{7}	4	6
(Australia) J Gajdošová	4	6^{3}
(South Africa) C Scheepers	6	7^{7}
(Czech Republic) I Benešová	6	5	7^{7}
(Belgium) Y Wickmayer	4	7	6^{5}

Second round
1	(Belarus) V Azarenka	6	6
(Israel) S Pe'er	1	2
WC	(Italy) K Knapp	3	6	1
14	(Slovakia) D Cibulková	6	4	6
(New Zealand) M Erakovic	7	1	2
(South Africa) C Scheepers	5	6	6
(Czech Republic) I Benešová	1	5
8	(China) N Li	6	7

Third round
1	(Belarus) V Azarenka
14	(Slovakia) D Cibulková	w/o
(South Africa) C Scheepers	6^{3}	2
8	(China) N Li	7^{7}	6

Quarterfinals
14	(Slovakia) D Cibulková	1	6^{4}
8	(China) N Li	6	7^{7}

==== Section 2 ====
First round
(Czech Republic) P Cetkovská	7	6
Q	(Belarus) O Govortsova	5	4
Q	(Russia) A Chakvetadze	2	6	4
Q	(United States) S Stephens	6	2	6
(Italy) F Pennetta	6	7^{7}
16	(Russia) M Kirilenko	1	6^{2}
9	(United States) S Williams	6	6
(Kazakhstan) G Voskoboeva	2	3
(Russia) N Petrova	6	6
Q	(Czech Republic) A Hlaváčková	3	3
(Spain) A Medina Garrigues	6	6
(China) J Zheng	2	1

Second round
3	(Poland) A Radwańska	4	6	1
(Czech Republic) P Cetkovská	6	4	6
Q	(United States) S Stephens	2	3
(Italy) F Pennetta	6	6
9	(United States) S Williams	4	6	6
(Russia) N Petrova	6	2	3
(Spain) A Medina Garrigues	6	4
6	(Denmark) C Wozniacki	4	0^{r}

Third round
(Czech Republic) P Cetkovská	0	1
(Italy) F Pennetta	6	6
9	(United States) S Williams	6	6
(Spain) A Medina Garrigues	3	1

Quarterfinals
(Italy) F Pennetta	0^{r}
9	(United States) S Williams	4

=== Bottom half ===
==== Section 3 ====
First round
Q	(Canada) A Wozniak	1	7^{7}	3
(Germany) J Görges	6	6^{1}	6
(United States) V King	6	6
(Bulgaria) T Pironkova	0	1
Q	(Australia) A Rodionova	6	5	2
12	(Germany) A Kerber	4	7	6
15	(Serbia) J Janković	3	6	6^{4}
(Romania) S Cîrstea	6	4	7^{7}
(Sweden) S Arvidsson	6	6
(Spain) MJ Martínez Sánchez	3	2
(Russia) A Pavlyuchenkova	6	6
(Kazakhstan) K Pervak	2	4

Second round
7	(France) M Bartoli	3	1
(Germany) J Görges	6	6
(United States) V King	3	2
12	(Germany) A Kerber	6	6
(Romania) S Cîrstea	6	6
(Sweden) S Arvidsson	3	1
(Russia) A Pavlyuchenkova	5	4
4	(Czech Republic) P Kvitová	7	6

Third round
(Germany) J Görges	4	1
12	(Germany) A Kerber	6	6
(Romania) S Cîrstea	2	7	2
4	(Czech Republic) P Kvitová	6	5	6

Quarterfinals
12	(Germany) A Kerber	7^{7}	1	6
4	(Czech Republic) P Kvitová	6^{2}	6	1

==== Section 4 ====
First round
PR	(Switzerland) T Bacsinszky	0	0^{r}
(Italy) S Errani	6	3
WC	(United States) V Williams	6	6
(Romania) S Halep	3	4
(Russia) E Makarova	6	6
10	(Italy) F Schiavone	3	4
13	(Serbia) A Ivanovic	6	6
(Russia) S Kuznetsova	4	3
WC	(Italy) A Brianti	2	1
Q	(Spain) S Soler Espinosa	6	6
(United States) C McHale	6	6
(Romania) M Niculescu	4	4

Second round
5	(Australia) S Stosur	6	7
(Italy) S Errani	3	5
WC	(United States) V Williams	7^{9}	6
(Russia) E Makarova	6^{7}	1
13	(Serbia) A Ivanovic	6	6
Q	(Spain) S Soler Espinosa	2	1
(United States) C McHale	5	5
2	(Russia) M Sharapova	7	7

Third round
5	(Australia) S Stosur	4	3
WC	(United States) V Williams	6	6
13	(Serbia) A Ivanovic	6^{4}	3
2	(Russia) M Sharapova	7^{7}	6

Quarterfinals
WC	(United States) V Williams	4	3
2	(Russia) M Sharapova	6	6

== Qualifying ==
=== Seeds ===
1. (Spain) Carla Suárez Navarro (first round)
2. (Croatia) Petra Martić (first round)
3. (Canada) Aleksandra Wozniak (qualified)
4. (Spain) Sílvia Soler Espinosa (qualified)
5. (Ukraine) Kateryna Bondarenko (first round, retired)
6. (France) Pauline Parmentier (qualifying competition)
7. (Chinese Taipei) Hsieh Su-wei (qualifying competition)
8. (Georgia (country)) Anna Tatishvili (first round)
9. (Hungary) Gréta Arn (first round)
10. (Russia) Vera Dushevina (qualifying competition)
11. (Belarus) Olga Govortsova (qualified)
12. (United States) Varvara Lepchenko (qualifying competition)
13. (Sweden) Johanna Larsson (first round)
14. (United States) Sloane Stephens (qualified)
15. (France) Mathilde Johansson (first round)
16. (United States) Jamie Hampton (first round)

=== Qualifiers ===
1. (Croatia) Mirjana Lučić
2. (Czech Republic) Andrea Hlaváčková
3. (Canada) Aleksandra Wozniak
4. (Spain) Sílvia Soler Espinosa
5. (Australia) Anastasia Rodionova
6. (Belarus) Olga Govortsova
7. (United States) Sloane Stephens
8. (Russia) Anna Chakvetadze

=== Qualifying draw ===
==== First qualifier ====
First round
1	(Spain) Carla Suárez Navarro	4	7	2
(Argentina) Gisela Dulko	6	5	6
(Croatia) Mirjana Lučić	6	6
16	(United States) Jamie Hampton	4	2

Qualifying competition
(Argentina) Gisela Dulko	3	7^{9}	4
(Croatia) Mirjana Lučić	6	6^{7}	6

==== Second qualifier ====
First round
2	(Croatia) Petra Martić	7^{7}	3	5
(Czech Republic) Andrea Hlaváčková	6^{3}	6	7
(Argentina) Paula Ormaechea	7	6
15	(France) Mathilde Johansson	5	1

Qualifying competition
(Czech Republic) Andrea Hlaváčková	6	1	6
(Argentina) Paula Ormaechea	4	6	3

==== Third qualifier ====
First round
3	(Canada) Aleksandra Wozniak	6	6
(Russia) Alla Kudryavtseva	1	1
WC	(Italy) Nastassja Burnett	4	6	6
13	(Sweden) Johanna Larsson	6	1	2

Qualifying competition
3	(Canada) Aleksandra Wozniak	7^{7}	4	6
WC	(Italy) Nastassja Burnett	6^{3}	6	4

==== Fourth qualifier ====
First round
4	(Spain) Sílvia Soler Espinosa	6	6
(Spain) Lourdes Domínguez Lino	4	3
(Ukraine) Lesia Tsurenko	6	6
9	(Hungary) Gréta Arn	2	2

Qualifying competition
4	(Spain) Sílvia Soler Espinosa	6	6
(Ukraine) Lesia Tsurenko	3	3

==== Fifth qualifier ====
First round
5	(Ukraine) Kateryna Bondarenko	6^{3}	0^{r}
(Australia) Anastasia Rodionova	7^{7}	0
(Chinese Taipei) Chang Kai-chen	3	1
10	(Russia) Vera Dushevina	6	6

Qualifying competition
(Australia) Anastasia Rodionova	6	6
10	(Russia) Vera Dushevina	2	4

==== Sixth qualifier ====
First round
6	(France) Pauline Parmentier	6	6
WC	(Italy) Anastasia Grymalska	2	3
(United States) Jill Craybas	5	3
11	(Belarus) Olga Govortsova	7	6

Qualifying competition
6	(France) Pauline Parmentier	2	1
11	(Belarus) Olga Govortsova	6	6

==== Seventh qualifier ====
First round
7	(Chinese Taipei) Hsieh Su-wei	6	6
WC	(Italy) Alexia Virgili	4	3
(United States) Bethanie Mattek-Sands	5	5
14	(United States) Sloane Stephens	7	7

Qualifying competition
7	(Chinese Taipei) Hsieh Su-wei	2	4
14	(United States) Sloane Stephens	6	6

==== Eighth qualifier ====
First round
8	(Georgia (country)) Anna Tatishvili	4	1
PR	(Russia) Anna Chakvetadze	6	6
WC	(Italy) Corinna Dentoni	4	2
12	(United States) Varvara Lepchenko	6	6

Qualifying competition
PR	(Russia) Anna Chakvetadze	6	4	6
12	(United States) Varvara Lepchenko	1	6	4
