= 2011 Masters =

2011 Masters may refer to:

- 2011 Masters Tournament, golf
- 2011 Masters (snooker)
- 2011 Monte-Carlo Rolex Masters, tennis
- 2011 ATP World Tour Masters 1000, tennis
- 2011 Deutsche Tourenwagen Masters season, touring car racing
- 2011 ADAC Formel Masters season, open wheel racing
- 2011 National Masters, English indoor football
