= Big Four career statistics =

Statistics for men's singles tennis players

The Big Four
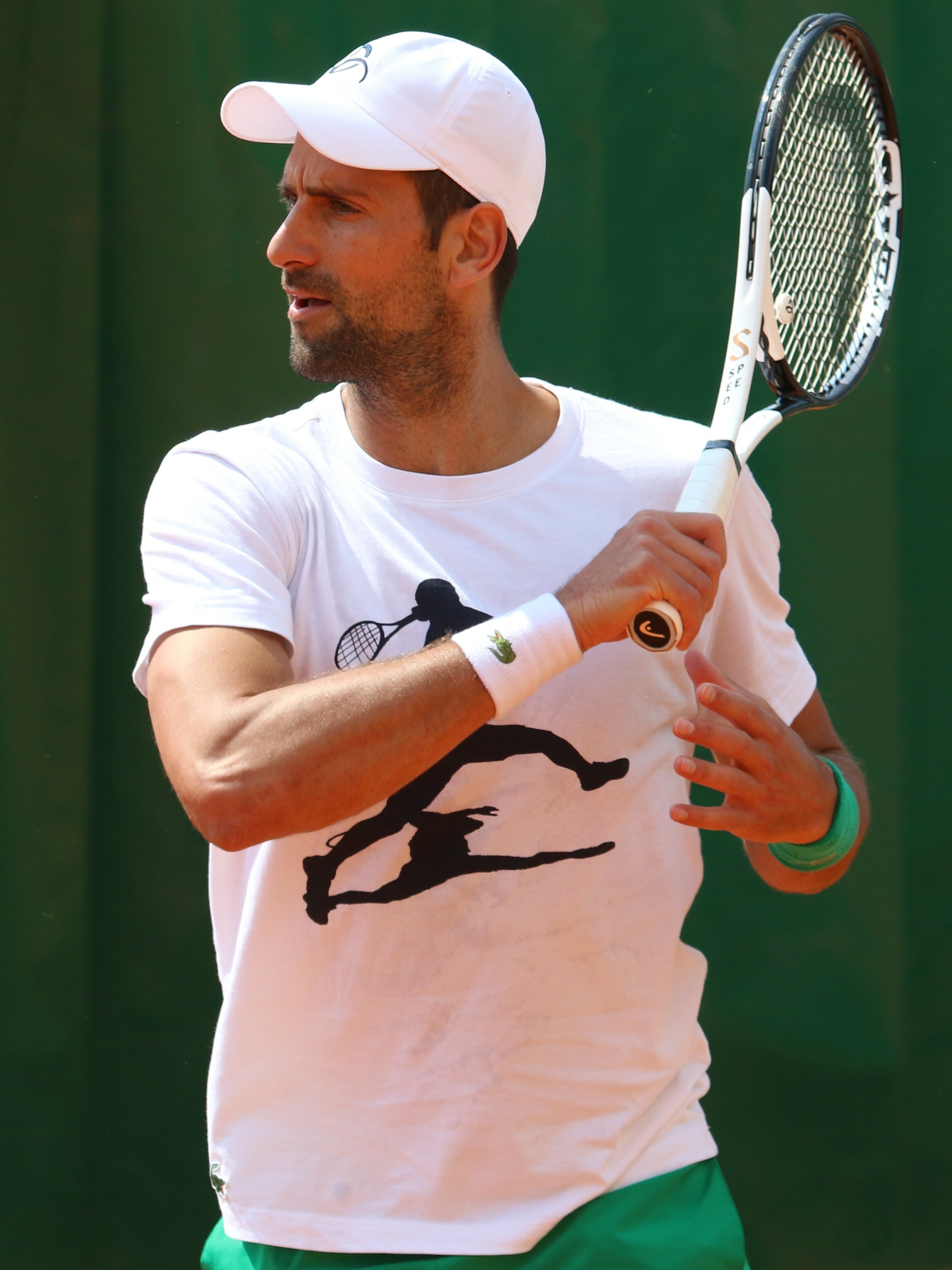
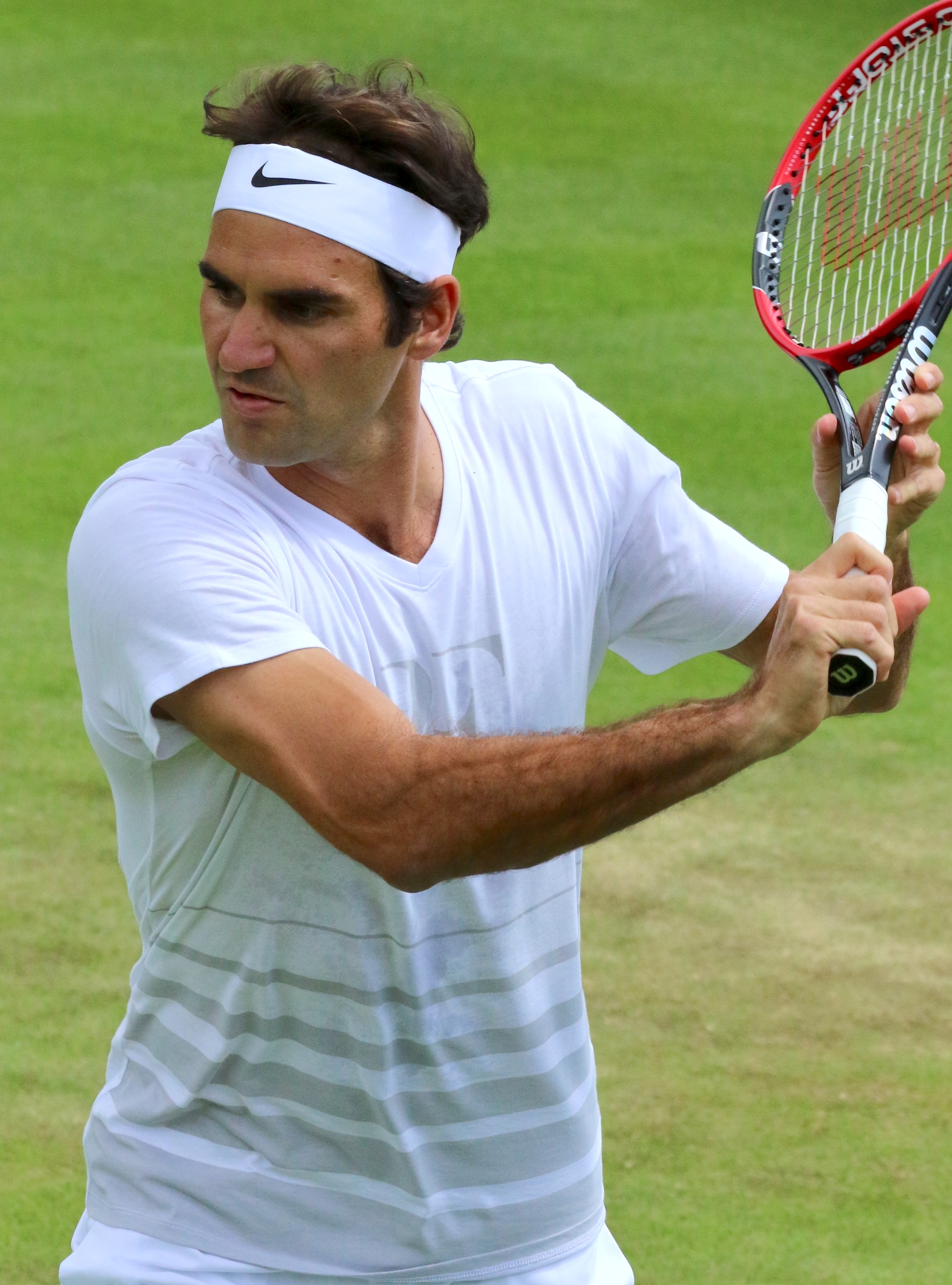
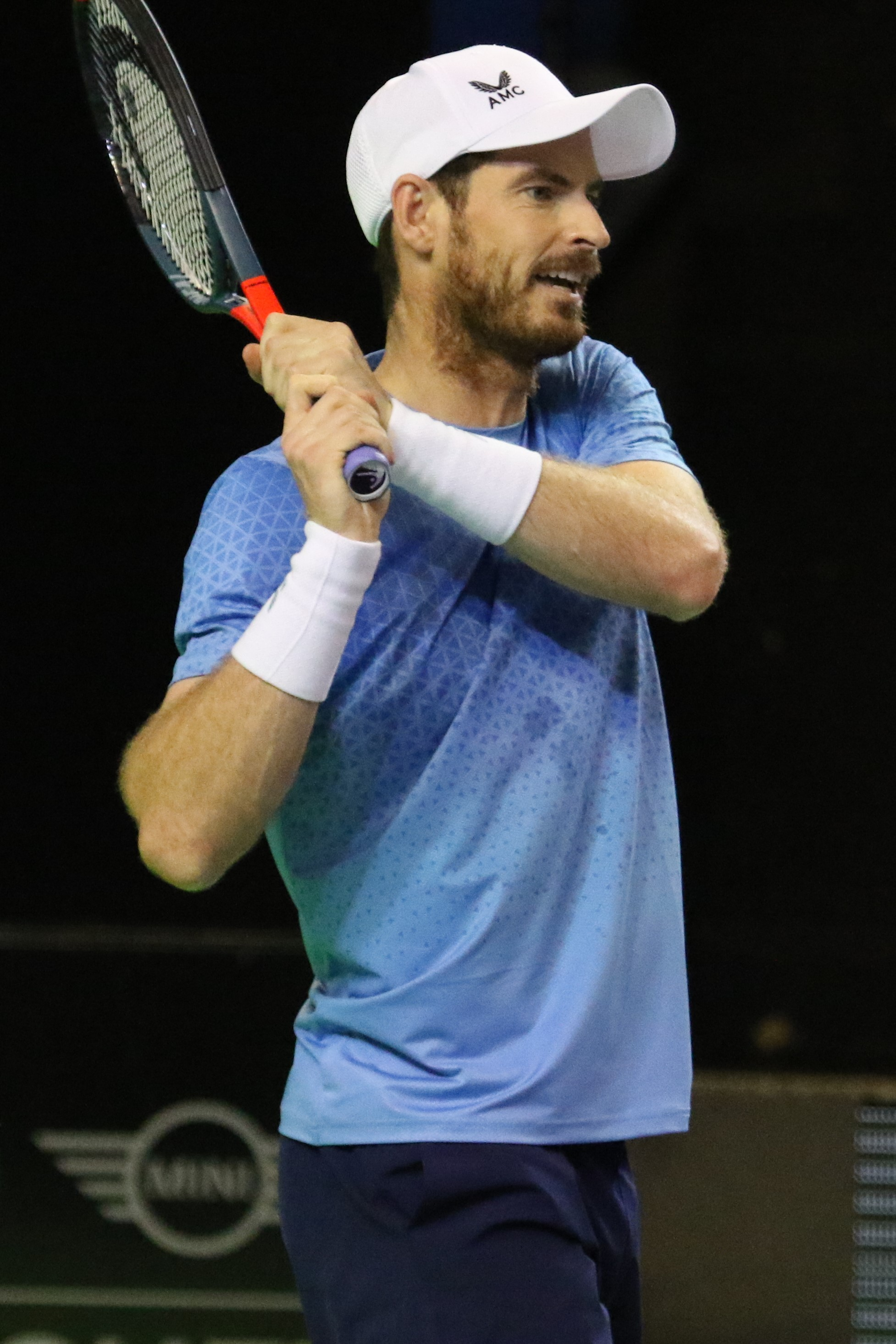
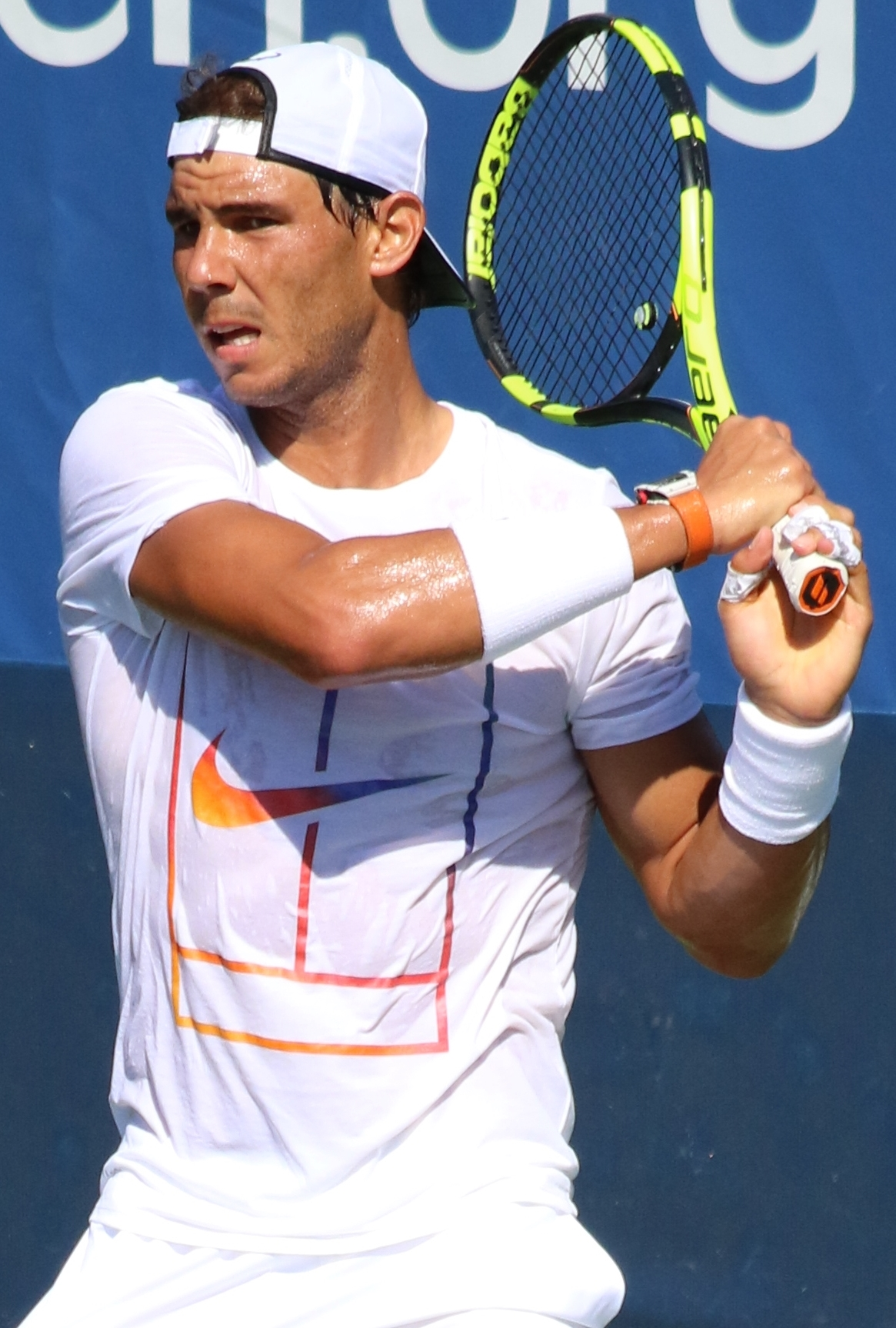
- Novak Djokovic Roger Federer Andy Murray Rafael Nadal
- Prize money: US$ 526 million: Top 4 all-time leaders in earnings

Singles
- Career record: 4252–1005 (80.9%) (Note: In ATP Tour and Grand Slam main draw matches, Olympics, Davis Cup, Laver Cup, ATP Cup and United Cup; Open Era tennis records)
- Career titles: 343
- Highest ranking: No. 1 (2 Feb 2004^{F}, 18 August 2008^{N}, 4 July 2011^{D}, 7 November 2016^{M})
- Current ranking: No. 8 (5 October 2026^{D})

Grand Slam singles results
- Australian Open: W (2004^{F}, 2006^{F}, 2007^{F}, 2008^{D}, 2009^{N}, 2010^{F}, 2011^{D}, 2012^{D}, 2013^{D}, 2015^{D}, 2016^{D}, 2017^{F}, 2018^{F}, 2019^{D}, 2020^{D}, 2021^{D}, 2022^{N}, 2023^{D})
- French Open: W (2005^{N}, 2006^{N},2007^{N}, 2008^{N}, 2009^{F}, 2010^{N}, 2011^{N}, 2012^{N}, 2013^{N}, 2014^{N}, 2016^{D}, 2017^{N}, 2018^{N}, 2019^{N}, 2020^{N}, 2021^{D}, 2022^{N}, 2023^{D})
- Wimbledon: W (2003^{F}, 2004^{F}, 2005^{F}, 2006^{F}, 2007^{F}, 2008^{N}, 2009^{F}, 2010^{N}, 2011^{D}, 2012^{F}, 2013^{M}, 2014^{D}, 2015^{D}, 2016^{M}, 2017^{F}, 2018^{D}, 2019^{D}, 2021^{D}, 2022^{D})
- US Open: W (2004^{F}, 2005^{F}, 2006^{F}, 2007^{F}, 2008^{F}, 2010^{N}, 2011^{D}, 2012^{M}, 2013^{N}, 2015^{D}, 2017^{N}, 2018^{D}, 2019^{N}, 2023^{D})

Other tournaments
- Tour Finals: W (2003^{F}, 2004^{F}, 2006^{F}, 2007^{F}, 2008^{D}, 2010^{F}, 2011^{F}, 2012^{D}, 2013^{D}, 2014^{D}, 2015^{D}, 2016^{M}, 2022^{D}, 2023^{D})
- Olympic Games: W (2008^{N}, 2012^{M}, 2016^{M}, 2024^{D})

Doubles
- Career record: 423–339 (55.5%)
- Career titles: 23

Grand Slam doubles results
- Australian Open: 3R (2003^{F}, 2004^{N}, 2005^{N})
- French Open: 2R (2006^{M})
- Wimbledon: QF (2000^{F})
- US Open: SF (2004^{N})

Other doubles tournaments
- Olympic Games: W (2008^{F}, 2016^{N})

Team competitions
- Davis Cup: W (2004^{N}, 2008^{N}, 2009^{N}, 2010^{D}, 2011^{N}, 2014^{F}, 2015^{M}, 2019^{N})
- Hopman Cup: W (2001^{F}, 2018^{F}, 2019^{F})
Medal record
Olympic Games – Tennis
Gold medal – first place	2008 Beijing	Singles^{N}
Gold medal – first place	2012 London	Singles^{M}
Gold medal – first place	2016 Rio de Janeiro	Singles^{M}
Gold medal – first place	2024 Paris	Singles^{D}
Gold medal – first place	2008 Beijing	Doubles^{F}
Gold medal – first place	2016 Rio de Janeiro	Doubles^{N}
Silver medal – second place	2012 London	Singles^{F}
Silver medal – second place	2012 London	Mixed Doubles^{M}
Bronze medal – third place	2008 Beijing	Singles^{D}

This is a list of the combined career statistics of the Big Four, the four players who dominated men's tennis in singles for the majority of the first quarter of the 21st century. The Big Four consists of Novak Djokovic, Roger Federer, Andy Murray, and Rafael Nadal.

== Overall dominance ==
=== Grand Slam events ===
For two decades, from 2003 Australian Open to 2026 French Open, the Big Four have won a combined 69 Grand Slam titles of 93 Grand Slam. (Note: The exceptions were Andre Agassi's wins at the 2003 Australian Open, Juan Carlos Ferrero's wins at the 2003 French Open, Andy Roddick's wins at the 2003 US Open, Gastón Gaudio's wins at the 2004 French Open, Marat Safin's wins at the 2005 Australian Open, Juan Martín del Potro's wins at the 2009 US Open, Stan Wawrinka's wins at the 2014 Australian Open, 2015 French Open and 2016 US Open, Marin Čilić's wins at the 2014 US Open, Dominic Thiem's wins at the 2020 US Open, Daniil Medvedev's wins at the 2021 US Open, Carlos Alcaraz's wins at the 2022 US Open, 2023 Wimbledon, 2024 French Open, 2024 Wimbledon, 2025 French Open, 2025 US Open and 2026 Australian Open, Jannik Sinner's wins at the 2024 Australian Open, 2024 US Open, 2025 Australian Open and 2025 Wimbledon.) Djokovic with a record 24 titles including a triple Career Grand Slam, Nadal with 22 including a double Career Grand Slam, Federer with 20 including a Career Grand Slam and Murray with 3. Although, Murray's 3 titles is the same with Stan Wawrinka, Murray's 11 Grand Slam finals and consistent appearances in the semifinals of the other Grand Slam, as well as being No. 1, placed him significantly ahead of any other player outside the Big Three during the period.

The dominance does not just consist of winning the Grand Slam, with all four members regularly making it to the latter stages of Grand Slam. 93 Grand Slam between 2003 Australian Open to 2026 French Open, 16 finals not include any member of the Big Four were those of 2003, 2005, 2024 2025 Australian Open and 2003, 2004, 2024, 2025 French Open, 2025 Wimbledon and 2003, 2014, 2020, 2022, 2024, 2025 US Open. They occupied 10 consecutive Grand Slam finals (winner and runner-up) from 2010 US Open to 2013 Australian Open. Since 2008, they have occupied all 4 semifinal spots on 4 occasions, at the 2008 US Open, 2011 French Open, 2011 US Open and 2012 Australian Open, as well as taking 3 of 4 spaces on 9 other separate occasions. In 2011, they occupied 14 of a possible 16 Grand Slam semifinals slots. In the same period, only twice did 2 or more, not in semifinal (2009 and 2010 French Open). In 2012, they took 13 of 16 Grand Slam semifinals slots.

The Big Four, along with Rod Laver and Jannik Sinner, are the only male players in the open era to reach all four Grand Slam finals in a single calendar year. Federer and Djokovic share the record, achieving this three times each (Federer in 2006, 2007 and 2009; Djokovic in 2015, 2021 and 2023). Murray, Nadal, Laver and Sinner have each done it once.

Prior to 2009, no player had made 20 Grand Slam finals, with Ivan Lendl leading the way with 19. However, since Big Three ascent, Djokovic with a record 38, Federer with 31, and Nadal with 30, have each surpassed Lendl's mark.

Key
W	F	SF	QF	#R	RR	Q#	DNQ	A	NH

(W) winner; (F) finalist; (SF) semifinalist; (QF) quarterfinalist; (#R) rounds 4, 3, 2, 1; (RR) round-robin stage; (Q#) qualification round; (DNQ) did not qualify; (A) absent; (NH) not held; (SR) strike rate (events won / competed); (W–L) win–loss record.
To avoid confusion and double counting, these charts are updated at the conclusion of a tournament or when the player's participation has ended.

=== Combined Grand Slam tournament performance timeline (best result) ===
Grand Slam	2003	2004	2005	2006	2007	2008	2009	2010	2011	2012	2013	2014	2015	2016	2017	2018	2019	2020	2021	2022	2023	2024	2025	2026	SR
Australian Open	4R^{F}	W^{F}	SF^{F}	W^{F}	W^{F}	W^{D}	W^{N}	W^{F}	W^{D}	W^{D}	W^{D}	F^{N}	W^{D}	W^{D}	W^{F}	W^{F}	W^{D}	W^{D}	W^{D}	W^{N}	W^{D}	SF^{D}	SF^{D}	F^{D}	18/24
French Open	1R^{F}	3R^{F}	W^{N}	W^{N}	W^{N}	W^{N}	W^{F}	W^{N}	W^{N}	W^{N}	W^{N}	W^{N}	F^{D}	W^{D}	W^{N}	W^{N}	W^{N}	W^{N}	W^{D}	W^{N}	W^{D}	QF^{D}	SF^{D}	3R^{D}	18/24
Wimbledon	W^{F}	W^{F}	W^{F}	W^{F}	W^{F}	W^{N}	W^{F}	W^{N}	W^{D}	W^{F}	W^{M}	W^{D}	W^{D}	W^{M}	W^{F}	W^{D}	W^{D}	NH (Note: not held due to the COVID-19 pandemic.)	W^{D}	W^{D}	F^{D}	F^{D}	SF^{D}	SF^{D}	19/23
US Open	4R^{F}	W^{F}	W^{F}	W^{F}	W^{F}	W^{F}	F^{F}	W^{N}	W^{D}	W^{M}	W^{N}	SF^{DF}	W^{D}	F^{D}	W^{N}	W^{D}	W^{N}	4R^{D}	F^{D}	4R^{N}	W^{D}	3R^{D}	SF^{D}	1R^{D}	14/24

==== Big Four Head-to-Head Grand Slam finals: 33 ====
The most common pairing in specific Big Four Grand Slam finals were Djokovic vs Murray at the Australian Open and Nadal vs Federer at the French Open, which both occurred on 4 occasions, in both cases, the same player triumphed 4 times, Djokovic in Australian Open and Nadal in Paris. Nadal and Djokovic have faced each other in 9 Grand Slam finals in total, as have Nadal and Federer, but Nadal and Murray never met in the final of Grand Slam. Djokovic, uniquely has met both Murray and Nadal at least once in the final of all 4 Grand Slam.

No.	Year	Championship	Surface	Winner	Runner-up	Score
1.	2006	French Open	Clay	(Spain) Rafael Nadal	(Switzerland) Roger Federer	1–6, 6–1, 6–4, 7–6^{(7–4)}
2.	2006	Wimbledon	Grass	(Switzerland) Roger Federer	(Spain) Rafael Nadal	6–0, 7–6^{(7–5)}, 6–7^{(2–7)}, 6–3
3.	2007	French Open	Clay	(Spain) Rafael Nadal	(Switzerland) Roger Federer	6–3, 4–6, 6–3, 6–4
4.	2007	Wimbledon	Grass	(Switzerland) Roger Federer	(Spain) Rafael Nadal	7–6^{(9–7)}, 4–6, 7–6^{(7–3)}, 2–6, 6–2
5.	2007	US Open	Hard	(Switzerland) Roger Federer	(Serbia) Novak Djokovic	7–6^{(7–4)}, 7–6^{(7–2)}, 6–4
6.	2008	French Open	Clay	(Spain) Rafael Nadal	(Switzerland) Roger Federer	6–1, 6–3, 6–0
7.	2008	Wimbledon	Grass	(Spain) Rafael Nadal	(Switzerland) Roger Federer	6–4, 6–4, 6–7^{(5–7)}, 6–7^{(8–10)}, 9–7
8.	2008	US Open	Hard	(Switzerland) Roger Federer	(United Kingdom) Andy Murray	6–2, 7–5, 6–2
9.	2009	Australian Open	Hard	(Spain) Rafael Nadal	(Switzerland) Roger Federer	7–5, 3–6, 7–6^{(7–3)}, 3–6, 6–2
10.	2010	Australian Open	Hard	(Switzerland) Roger Federer	(United Kingdom) Andy Murray	6–3, 6–4, 7–6^{(13–11)}
11.	2010	US Open	Hard	(Spain) Rafael Nadal	(Serbia) Novak Djokovic	6–4, 5–7, 6–4, 6–2
12.	2011	Australian Open	Hard	(Serbia) Novak Djokovic	(United Kingdom) Andy Murray	6–4, 6–2, 6–3
13.	2011	French Open	Clay	(Spain) Rafael Nadal	(Switzerland) Roger Federer	7–5, 7–6^{(7–3)}, 5–7, 6–1
14.	2011	Wimbledon	Grass	(Serbia) Novak Djokovic	(Spain) Rafael Nadal	6–4, 6–1, 1–6, 6–3
15.	2011	US Open	Hard	(Serbia) Novak Djokovic	(Spain) Rafael Nadal	6–2, 6–4, 6–7^{(3–7)}, 6–1
16.	2012	Australian Open	Hard	(Serbia) Novak Djokovic	(Spain) Rafael Nadal	5–7, 6–4, 6–2, 6–7^{(5–7)}, 7–5
17.	2012	French Open	Clay	(Spain) Rafael Nadal	(Serbia) Novak Djokovic	6–4, 6–3, 2–6, 7–5
18.	2012	Wimbledon	Grass	(Switzerland) Roger Federer	(United Kingdom) Andy Murray	4–6, 7–5, 6–3, 6–4
19.	2012	US Open	Hard	(United Kingdom) Andy Murray	(Serbia) Novak Djokovic	7–6^{(12–10)}, 7–5, 2–6, 3–6, 6–2
20.	2013	Australian Open	Hard	(Serbia) Novak Djokovic	(United Kingdom) Andy Murray	6–7^{(2–7)}, 7–6^{(7–3)}, 6–3, 6–2
21.	2013	Wimbledon	Grass	(United Kingdom) Andy Murray	(Serbia) Novak Djokovic	6–4, 7–5, 6–4
22.	2013	US Open	Hard	(Spain) Rafael Nadal	(Serbia) Novak Djokovic	6–2, 3–6, 6–4, 6–1
23.	2014	French Open	Clay	(Spain) Rafael Nadal	(Serbia) Novak Djokovic	3–6, 7–5, 6–2, 6–4
24.	2014	Wimbledon	Grass	(Serbia) Novak Djokovic	(Switzerland) Roger Federer	6–7^{(7–9)}, 6–4, 7–6^{(7–4)}, 5–7, 6–4
25.	2015	Australian Open	Hard	(Serbia) Novak Djokovic	(United Kingdom) Andy Murray	7–6^{(7–5)}, 6–7^{(4–7)}, 6–3, 6–0
26.	2015	Wimbledon	Grass	(Serbia) Novak Djokovic	(Switzerland) Roger Federer	7–6^{(7–1)}, 6–7^{(10–12)}, 6–4, 6–3
27.	2015	US Open	Hard	(Serbia) Novak Djokovic	(Switzerland) Roger Federer	6–4, 5–7, 6–4, 6–4
28.	2016	Australian Open	Hard	(Serbia) Novak Djokovic	(United Kingdom) Andy Murray	6–1, 7–5, 7–6^{(7–3)}
29.	2016	French Open	Clay	(Serbia) Novak Djokovic	(United Kingdom) Andy Murray	3–6, 6–1, 6–2, 6–4
30.	2017	Australian Open	Hard	(Switzerland) Roger Federer	(Spain) Rafael Nadal	6–4, 3–6, 6–1, 3–6, 6–3
31.	2019	Australian Open	Hard	(Serbia) Novak Djokovic	(Spain) Rafael Nadal	6–3, 6–2, 6–3
32.	2019	Wimbledon	Grass	(Serbia) Novak Djokovic	(Switzerland) Roger Federer	7–6^{(7–5)}, 1–6, 7–6^{(7–4)}, 4–6, 13–12^{(7–3)}
33.	2020	French Open	Clay	(Spain) Rafael Nadal	(Serbia) Novak Djokovic	6–0, 6–2, 7–5

=== Masters 1000 events ===
Similarly, Masters 1000 events have been dominated by the Big Four. Djokovic with a record 40 titles including a double Career Golden Masters, Nadal with 36, Federer with 28 and Murray with 14. They have won a combined 118 titles. Between 2005 Indian Wells to 2017 Madrid, they collectively won 96 of 112 (85.7%), however, their most dominant period was from 2011 Indian Wells to 2017 Madrid where they won 54 of 58 (93.1%). This includes all 9 in 2011, 2013 and 2015. Moreover, from 2014 Cincinnati to 2016 Toronto, they won 18 consecutive Masters 1000 events. From the beginning of 2013 through the first 6 events of 2017, they had a streak of 42 consecutive Masters 1000 events where at least one of the four reached the final, winning a combined 37 titles (88.1%). Strangely, only two times (2009 and 2011) did all four win at least one 1000 event during the same calendar year. Federer, Nadal, Djokovic and Murray won their first Masters 1000 events in 2002, 2005, 2007 and 2008 respectively. Since then, the only Masters 1000 events missed in their respective careers were: Federer: Monte Carlo (Clay) and Rome (Clay); Nadal: Miami (Hard Outdoor), Shanghai (Hard Outdoor) and Paris (Hard Indoor); Djokovic: Hamburg (Clay) and Madrid (Hard Indoor); Murray: Indian Wells (Hard Outdoor) and Monte Carlo (Clay).

==== Combined Masters 1000 performance timeline (best result) ====
ATP Masters 1000	2002	2003	2004	2005	2006	2007	2008	2009	2010	2011	2012	2013	2014	2015	2016	2017	2018	2019	2020	2021	2022	2023	2024	2025	2026	SR
Indian Wells Open	3R^{F}	2R^{F}	W^{F}	W^{F}	W^{F}	W^{N}	W^{D}	W^{N}	SF^{N}	W^{D}	W^{F}	W^{N}	W^{D}	W^{D}	W^{D}	W^{F}	F^{F}	F^{F}	NH	3R^{M}	F^{N}	3R^{M}	3R^{D}	2R^{D}	4R^{D}	13/24
Miami Open	F^{F}	QF^{F}	4R^{N}	W^{F}	W^{F}	W^{D}	F^{N}	W^{M}	SF^{N}	W^{D}	W^{D}	W^{M}	W^{D}	W^{D}	W^{D}	W^{F}	2R^{DF}	W^{F}	NH	A	2R^{M}	1R^{M}	3R^{M}	F^{D}	A	12/22
Monte Carlo Masters	2R^{F}	3R^{N}	A	W^{N}	W^{N}	W^{N}	W^{N}	W^{N}	W^{N}	W^{N}	W^{N}	W^{D}	F^{F}	W^{D}	W^{N}	W^{N}	W^{N}	SF^{N}	NH	QF^{N}	2R^{D}	3R^{D}	SF^{D}	2R^{D}	A	13/22
Madrid Open (Note: Held as Hamburg Open until 2008, and Madrid Open 2009–present.)	W^{F}	3R^{NF}	W^{F}	W^{F}	2R^{MD}	W^{F}	W^{N}	W^{F}	W^{N}	W^{D}	W^{F}	W^{N}	W^{N}	W^{M}	W^{D}	W^{N}	QF^{N}	W^{D}	NH	QF^{N}	SF^{D}	1R^{M}	4R^{N}	2R^{D}	A	15/24
Italian Open	1R^{F}	F^{F}	2R^{F}	W^{N}	W^{N}	W^{N}	W^{D}	W^{N}	W^{N}	W^{D}	W^{N}	W^{N}	W^{D}	W^{D}	W^{M}	F^{D}	W^{N}	W^{N}	W^{D}	W^{N}	W^{D}	QF^{D}	3R^{D}	A	2R^{D}	17/24
Canadian Open	1R^{F}	SF^{F}	W^{F}	W^{N}	W^{F}	W^{D}	W^{N}	W^{M}	W^{M}	W^{D}	W^{D}	W^{N}	F^{F}	W^{M}	W^{D}	F^{F}	W^{N}	W^{N}	NH	A	1R^{M}	3R^{M}	A	A	A	14/20
Cincinnati Open	1R^{F}	2R^{F}	1R^{FN}	W^{F}	QF^{NM}	W^{F}	W^{M}	W^{F}	W^{F}	W^{M}	W^{F}	W^{N}	W^{F}	W^{F}	F^{M}	QF^{N}	W^{D}	SF^{D}	W^{D}	2R^{M}	2R^{NM}	W^{D}	A	A	2R^{D}	13/23
Shanghai Masters (Note: Held as Madrid Open from 2002 to 2008, and Shanghai Masters 2009–present.)	QF^{F}	SF^{F}	2R^{N}	W^{N}	W^{F}	F^{F}	W^{M}	F^{N}	W^{M}	W^{M}	W^{D}	W^{D}	W^{F}	W^{D}	W^{M}	W^{F}	W^{D}	QF^{DF}	NH			1R^{M}	F^{D}	SF^{D}		12/21
Paris Masters	QF^{F}	QF^{F}	A	3R^{D}	3R^{M}	F^{N}	QF^{NFM}	W^{D}	SF^{F}	W^{F}	3R^{M}	W^{D}	W^{D}	W^{D}	W^{M}	QF^{N}	F^{D}	W^{D}	SF^{N}	W^{D}	F^{D}	W^{D}	A	A		9/21

===== Big Four Masters 1000 finals: 48 =====
The four have met one another at least twice in Masters 1000 finals. Their head-to-head records are: Federer 5–7 Nadal; Federer 3–5 Djokovic; Federer 0–2 Murray; Nadal 7–7 Djokovic; Nadal 1–1 Murray; Djokovic 5–5 Murray. Overall, in 48 'Big 4' Masters 1000 finals, Federer is 8–14; Nadal 15–13; Djokovic 17–15 and Murray 8–6.

No.	Year	Surface	Events	Winner	Runner-up	Score
1.	2005	Hard	Miami	(Switzerland) Roger Federer	(Spain) Rafael Nadal	2–6, 6–7^{(4–7)}, 7–6^{(7–5)}, 6–3, 6–1
2.	2006	Clay	Monte Carlo	(Spain) Rafael Nadal	(Switzerland) Roger Federer	6–2, 6–7^{(2–7)}, 6–3, 7–6^{(7–5)}
3.	2006	Clay	Rome	(Spain) Rafael Nadal	(Switzerland) Roger Federer	6–7^{(0–7)}, 7–6^{(7–5)}, 6–4, 2–6, 7–6^{(7–5)}
4.	2007	Hard	Indian Wells	(Spain) Rafael Nadal	(Serbia) Novak Djokovic	6–2, 7–5
5.	2007	Clay	Monte Carlo	(Spain) Rafael Nadal	(Switzerland) Roger Federer	6–4, 6–4
6.	2007	Clay	Hamburg	(Switzerland) Roger Federer	(Spain) Rafael Nadal	2–6, 6–2, 6–0
7.	2007	Hard	Canada	(Serbia) Novak Djokovic	(Switzerland) Roger Federer	7–6^{(7–2)}, 2–6, 7–6^{(7–2)}
8.	2008	Clay	Monte Carlo	(Spain) Rafael Nadal	(Switzerland) Roger Federer	7–5, 7–5
9.	2008	Clay	Hamburg	(Spain) Rafael Nadal	(Switzerland) Roger Federer	7–5, 6–7^{(3–7)}, 6–3
10.	2008	Hard	Cincinnati	(United Kingdom) Andy Murray	(Serbia) Novak Djokovic	7–6^{(7–4)}, 7–6^{(7–5)}
11.	2009	Hard	Indian Wells	(Spain) Rafael Nadal	(United Kingdom) Andy Murray	6–1, 6–2
12.	2009	Hard	Miami	(United Kingdom) Andy Murray	(Serbia) Novak Djokovic	6–2, 7–5
13.	2009	Clay	Monte Carlo	(Spain) Rafael Nadal	(Serbia) Novak Djokovic	6–3, 2–6, 6–1
14.	2009	Clay	Rome	(Spain) Rafael Nadal	(Serbia) Novak Djokovic	7–6^{(7–2)}, 6–2
15.	2009	Clay	Madrid	(Switzerland) Roger Federer	(Spain) Rafael Nadal	6–4, 6–4
16.	2009	Hard	Cincinnati	(Switzerland) Roger Federer	(Serbia) Novak Djokovic	6–1, 7–5
17.	2010	Clay	Madrid	(Spain) Rafael Nadal	(Switzerland) Roger Federer	6–4, 7–6^{(7–5)}
18.	2010	Hard	Canada	(United Kingdom) Andy Murray	(Switzerland) Roger Federer	7–5, 7–5
19.	2010	Hard	Shanghai	(United Kingdom) Andy Murray	(Switzerland) Roger Federer	6–3, 6–2
20.	2011	Hard	Indian Wells	(Serbia) Novak Djokovic	(Spain) Rafael Nadal	4–6, 6–3, 6–2
21.	2011	Hard	Miami	(Serbia) Novak Djokovic	(Spain) Rafael Nadal	4–6, 6–3, 7–6^{(7–4)}
22.	2011	Clay	Madrid	(Serbia) Novak Djokovic	(Spain) Rafael Nadal	7–5, 6–4
23.	2011	Clay	Rome	(Serbia) Novak Djokovic	(Spain) Rafael Nadal	6–4, 6–4
24.	2011	Hard	Cincinnati	(United Kingdom) Andy Murray	(Serbia) Novak Djokovic	6–4, 3–0 ret.
25.	2012	Hard	Miami	(Serbia) Novak Djokovic	(United Kingdom) Andy Murray	6–1, 7–6^{(7–4)}
26.	2012	Clay	Monte Carlo	(Spain) Rafael Nadal	(Serbia) Novak Djokovic	6–3, 6–1
27.	2012	Clay	Rome	(Spain) Rafael Nadal	(Serbia) Novak Djokovic	7–5, 6–3
28.	2012	Hard	Cincinnati	(Switzerland) Roger Federer	(Serbia) Novak Djokovic	6–0, 7–6^{(9–7)}
29.	2012	Hard	Shanghai	(Serbia) Novak Djokovic	(United Kingdom) Andy Murray	5–7, 7–6^{(13–11)}, 6–3
30.	2013	Clay	Monte Carlo	(Serbia) Novak Djokovic	(Spain) Rafael Nadal	6–2, 7–6^{(7–1)}
31.	2013	Clay	Rome	(Spain) Rafael Nadal	(Switzerland) Roger Federer	6–1, 6–3
32.	2014	Hard	Indian Wells	(Serbia) Novak Djokovic	(Switzerland) Roger Federer	3–6, 6–3, 7–6^{(7–3)}
33.	2014	Hard	Miami	(Serbia) Novak Djokovic	(Spain) Rafael Nadal	6–3, 6–3
34.	2014	Clay	Rome	(Serbia) Novak Djokovic	(Spain) Rafael Nadal	4–6, 6–3, 6–3
35.	2015	Hard	Indian Wells	(Serbia) Novak Djokovic	(Switzerland) Roger Federer	6–3, 6–7^{(5–7)}, 6–2
36.	2015	Hard	Miami	(Serbia) Novak Djokovic	(United Kingdom) Andy Murray	7–6^{(7–3)}, 4–6, 6–0
37.	2015	Clay	Madrid	(United Kingdom) Andy Murray	(Spain) Rafael Nadal	6–3, 6–2
38.	2015	Clay	Rome	(Serbia) Novak Djokovic	(Switzerland) Roger Federer	6–4, 6–3
39.	2015	Hard	Canada	(United Kingdom) Andy Murray	(Serbia) Novak Djokovic	6–4, 4–6, 6–3
40.	2015	Hard	Cincinnati	(Switzerland) Roger Federer	(Serbia) Novak Djokovic	7–6^{(7–1)}, 6–3
41.	2015	Hard (i)	Paris	(Serbia) Novak Djokovic	(United Kingdom) Andy Murray	6–2, 6–4
42.	2016	Clay	Madrid	(Serbia) Novak Djokovic	(United Kingdom) Andy Murray	6–2, 3–6, 6–3
43.	2016	Clay	Rome	(United Kingdom) Andy Murray	(Serbia) Novak Djokovic	6–3, 6–3
44.	2017	Hard	Miami	(Switzerland) Roger Federer	(Spain) Rafael Nadal	6–3, 6–4
45.	2017	Hard	Shanghai	(Switzerland) Roger Federer	(Spain) Rafael Nadal	6–4, 6–3
46.	2018	Hard	Cincinnati	(Serbia) Novak Djokovic	(Switzerland) Roger Federer	6–4, 6–4
47.	2019	Clay	Rome	(Spain) Rafael Nadal	(Serbia) Novak Djokovic	6–0, 4–6, 6–1
48.	2021	Clay	Rome	(Spain) Rafael Nadal	(Serbia) Novak Djokovic	7–5, 1–6, 6–3

From 2004 to 2023, the Big Four have combined to win 117 of 172 Masters 1000 finals. Djokovic won 40 titles, Nadal won 36, Federer won 27, and Murray 14, with only Daniil Medvedev, Alexander Zverev, Carlos Alcaraz, Andy Roddick, Nikolay Davydenko, Marat Safin, David Nalbandian and Hubert Hurkacz winning two titles or more during the period, six, five, four, three, three, two, two and two titles respectively.

Only 30 players outside the Big Four have reached 2 or more Masters 1000 finals during 2004 to 2023. Andy Roddick made it to 6 finals and won three. (2004 Miami, 2006 Cincinnati, 2010 Miami) Guillermo Coria made it to 5 finals and won one. (2004 Monte Carlo) David Nalbandian made it to 5 finals and won two. (2007 Madrid, 2007 Paris) Jo-Wilfried Tsonga made 4 finals and won the 2008 Paris and 2014 Toronto title. Ivan Ljubičić made it to 4 finals and won one. (2010 Indian Wells) Tomáš Berdych made 3 finals from 2010 to 2015, and had also previously won the 2005 Paris title. David Ferrer made it to 7 finals between 2010 to 2015, winning a title at the 2012 Paris. Stan Wawrinka made it to 3 finals and won the 2014 Monte Carlo title. Alexander Zverev made it to 10 finals and won 5 titles. (2017 Rome, 2017 Montreal, 2018 Madrid, 2021 Madrid, 2021 Cincinnati) Juan Martín del Potro reached 4 finals between 2009 to 2018, and won the 2018 Indian Wells title. John Isner has made it to 5 finals between 2012 to 2019, and won the 2018 Miami title. Dominic Thiem has made it to 3 finals and won the 2019 Indian Wells title. Daniil Medvedev made it to 9 finals and won 6 titles. (2019 Cincinnati, 2019 Shanghai, 2020 Paris, 2021 Toronto, 2023 Miami, 2023 Rome) Hubert Hurkacz made it to 3 finals and won two. (2021 Miami, 2023 Shanghai) Stefanos Tsitsipas made it to 6 finals and won the 2021 Monte Carlo and 2022 Monte Carlo title. Carlos Alcaraz made it to 5 finals and won four. (2022 Miami, 2022 Madrid, 2023 Indian Wells, 2023 Madrid) Borna Ćorić made it to 2 finals and won one. (2022 Cincinnati) Holger Rune made it to 3 finals and won one. (2022 Paris) Andrey Rublev made it to 4 finals and won one. (2023 Monte Carlo) Jannik Sinner made it to 3 finals and won one. (2023 Toronto)

Only Marat Safin made it to 2 finals and won all two. (2004 Madrid, 2004 Paris) Nikolay Davydenko made it to 3 finals and won all three. (2006 Paris, 2008 Miami, 2009 Shanghai)

Lleyton Hewitt, Fernando González, James Blake and Gilles Simon made it to 2 finals but won none. Richard Gasquet, Mardy Fish and Gaël Monfils made it to 3 finals but won none. Milos Raonic and Kei Nishikori made it to 4 finals but won none.

Only 11 players during 2004 to 2023 outside of the Big Four won a title by beating a member of the Big Four in the Masters 1000 finals:

- David Nalbandian defeated Federer and Nadal (2007 Madrid, 2007 Paris)
- Nikolay Davydenko defeated Nadal (2008 Miami, 2009 Shanghai)
- Stan Wawrinka defeated Federer (2014 Monte Carlo), Jo-Wilfried Tsonga defeated Djokovic, Murray and Federer (2014 Toronto)
- Marin Čilić defeated Murray (2016 Cincinnati)
- Alexander Zverev defeated Djokovic and Federer (2017 Rome, 2017 Montreal)
- Juan Martín del Potro defeated Federer (2018 Indian Wells), Karen Khachanov defeated Djokovic (2018 Paris)
- Dominic Thiem defeated Federer (2019 Indian Wells)
- Taylor Fritz defeated Nadal (2022 Indian Wells), Holger Rune defeated Djokovic (2022 Paris)

The Big Four had a streak of 42 consecutive Masters 1000 finals appearances (from 2013 Indian Wells to 2017 Montreal). They won 18 consecutive titles from the 2014 Cincinnati to 2016 Toronto. Nadal and Djokovic held all 9 Masters 1000 titles starting with 2013 Monte Carlo to 2014 Miami.

=== Combined ATP Finals performance timeline (best result) ===
- Since the year of first ATP Finals qualification.

ATP Finals	2002	2003	2004	2005	2006	2007	2008	2009	2010	2011	2012	2013	2014	2015	2016	2017	2018	2019	2020	2021	2022	2023	2024	2025	2026	SR
ATP Finals	SF^{F}	W^{F}	W^{F}	F^{F}	W^{F}	W^{F}	W^{D}	SF^{F}	W^{F}	W^{F}	W^{D}	W^{D}	W^{D}	W^{D}	W^{M}	SF^{F}	F^{D}	SF^{F}	SF^{DN}	SF^{D}	W^{D}	W^{D}	A	A		14/22

==== Big Four ATP Finals finals: 6 ====
Year	Location	Surface	Winner	Runner-up	Score
2010	London	Hard (i)	(Switzerland) Roger Federer	(Spain) Rafael Nadal	6–3, 3–6, 6–1
2012	London	Hard (i)	(Serbia) Novak Djokovic	(Switzerland) Roger Federer	7–6^{(8–6)}, 7–5
2013	London	Hard (i)	(Serbia) Novak Djokovic	(Spain) Rafael Nadal	6–3, 6–4
2014	London	Hard (i)	(Serbia) Novak Djokovic	(Switzerland) Roger Federer	Walkover
2015	London	Hard (i)	(Serbia) Novak Djokovic	(Switzerland) Roger Federer	6–3, 6–4
2016	London	Hard (i)	(United Kingdom) Andy Murray	(Serbia) Novak Djokovic	6–3, 6–4

=== Combined Olympic Games singles performance timeline (best result) ===
Olympic Games	2000	2004	2008	2012	2016	2021	2024	SR
Olympic Games	4th^{F}	2R^{F}	G^{N}	G^{M}	G^{M}	4th^{D}	G^{D}	4/7

==== Big Four Olympic finals ====
Year	Games	Surface	Winner	Runner-up	Score
2012	London	Grass	(United Kingdom) Andy Murray	(Switzerland) Roger Federer	6–2, 6–1, 6–4

==== Big Four finals in ATP 500 & ATP 250: 15 ====
No.	Year	Surface	Events	Winner	Runner-up	Score
1.	2005	Hard (i)	Bangkok	(Switzerland) Roger Federer	(United Kingdom) Andy Murray	6–3, 7–5
2.	2006	Hard	Dubai	(Spain) Rafael Nadal	(Switzerland) Roger Federer	2–6, 6–4, 6–4
3.	2008	Grass	Queen's Club	(Spain) Rafael Nadal	(Serbia) Novak Djokovic	7–6^{(8–6)}, 7–5
4.	2009	Hard (i)	Rotterdam	(United Kingdom) Andy Murray	(Spain) Rafael Nadal	6–3, 4–6, 6–0
5.	2009	Hard (i)	Basel	(Serbia) Novak Djokovic	(Switzerland) Roger Federer	6–4, 4–6, 6–2
6.	2010	Hard (i)	Basel	(Switzerland) Roger Federer	(Serbia) Novak Djokovic	6–4, 3–6, 6–1
7.	2011	Hard	Dubai	(Serbia) Novak Djokovic	(Switzerland) Roger Federer	6–3, 6–3
8.	2011	Hard	Tokyo	(United Kingdom) Andy Murray	(Spain) Rafael Nadal	3–6, 6–2, 6–0
9.	2012	Hard	Dubai	(Switzerland) Roger Federer	(United Kingdom) Andy Murray	7–5, 6–4
10.	2013	Hard	Beijing	(Serbia) Novak Djokovic	(Spain) Rafael Nadal	6–3, 6–4
11.	2015	Hard	Dubai	(Switzerland) Roger Federer	(Serbia) Novak Djokovic	6–3, 7–5
12.	2015	Hard	Beijing	(Serbia) Novak Djokovic	(Spain) Rafael Nadal	6–2, 6–2
13.	2015	Hard (i)	Basel	(Switzerland) Roger Federer	(Spain) Rafael Nadal	6–3, 5–7, 6–3
14.	2016	Hard	Doha	(Serbia) Novak Djokovic	(Spain) Rafael Nadal	6–1, 6–2
15.	2017	Hard	Doha	(Serbia) Novak Djokovic	(United Kingdom) Andy Murray	6–3, 5–7, 6–4

=== Big Titles ===
Grand Slam, ATP Masters 1000 events and ATP Finals are considered the top tier events of the ATP Tour annual calendar, in addition to the quadrennial Olympics Games. They make up the most coveted titles in men's tennis and are collectively known as the 'Big Titles'. Djokovic, uniquely, won all titles of the annual calendar, Federer won all 4 Grand Slam and ATP Finals, Nadal won all 4 Grand Slam and the Olympics and Murray won at least a title in the Big Titles, Grand Slam, Masters 1000, ATP Finals and Olympics Games.

Each holds records in one of the Grand Slam men's individual events; Djokovic's 10 Australian Open titles, Nadal's 14 titles at the French Open, Federer's 8 Wimbledon titles and Murray's pair of Olympics golds represent the outright record in each of those events, while Federer shares the Open Era record of 5 US Open titles with Pete Sampras and Jimmy Connors, behind 7 titles won by William Larned, Richard Sears and Bill Tilden in the Pre-Open Era.

Current as of 2026 US Open

Titles	Player	Grand Slams				ATP Finals	ATP Masters									Olympics (Note: The Olympics gold medal entered the Big Titles list in 2019.)	Career Grand Slam	Career Super Slam	Career Golden Slam	Career Golden Masters	W–L (%)
Titles	Player	AO	RG	WIM	USO	ATP Finals	IW	MIA	MON	MAD	ROM	CAN	CIN	SHA	PAR	Olympics	Career Grand Slam	Career Super Slam	Career Golden Slam	Career Golden Masters	W–L (%)
72	(Serbia) Novak Djokovic	W (10)	W (3)	W (7)	W (4)	W (7)	W (5)	W (6)	W (2)	W (3)	W (6)	W (4)	W (3)	W (4)	W (7)	Tennis at the 2008 Summer Olympics – Men's singles Tennis at the 2024 Summer Olympics – Men's singles	2016, 2021, 2023	2024	2024	2018, 2020	898–181 (83.2%)
59	(Spain) Rafael Nadal	W (2)	W (14)	W (2)	W (4)	F (2)	W (3)	F (5)	W (11)	W (5)	W (10)	W (5)	W (1)	W (1)	F (1)	Tennis at the 2008 Summer Olympics – Men's singles	2010, 2022	×	2010	×	756–155 (83%)
54	(Switzerland) Roger Federer	W (6)	W (1)	W (8)	W (5)	W (6)	W (5)	W (4)	F (4)	W (6)^{§}	F (4)	W (2)	W (7)	W (3)^{§}	W (1)	Tennis at the 2012 Summer Olympics – Men's singles	2009	×	×	×	822–190 (81.2%)
20	(United Kingdom) Andy Murray	F (5)	F (1)	W (2)	W (1)	W (1)	F (1)	W (2)	SF (3)	W (1)	W (1)	W (3)	W (2)	W (4)^{§}	W (1)	Tennis at the 2012 Summer Olympics – Men's singles Tennis at the 2016 Summer Olympics – Men's singles	×	×	×	×	458–170 (72.9%)
205	Total	69				14	118									6	6	1	2	2	2934–696 (80.8%)

Other feats: Djokovic achieved a Non-calendar Grand Slam. Nadal and Djokovic both achieved a Surface Slam. Nadal, Djokovic and Federer achieved a Channel Slam and a Three-Quarter Slam.

Outright active tournament record underlined (§ = title(s) in different tournament(s))

== Rivalries ==
The respective rivalries between the Big Four are considered to be some of the greatest of all time. Amongst the four of them they have played 235 matches against each other, 74 of which were at Grand Slam events. This includes 33 Grand Slam events finals, as well as 26 Grand Slam semifinal meetings, more than any other group of four players. Currently, Djokovic leads the head to head record against all members of the Big Four. Djokovic has also won 20+ matches against all three of his peers, while Nadal has won 20+ matches against two of his peers. The Djokovic–Nadal and Djokovic–Federer rivalries are the only two in the Open Era to reach 50 matches. With five, Federer has recorded most bagels against all three of his peers, while receiving only one.

=== Head-to-Head record ===
Player	(Serbia) Djokovic	(Spain) Nadal	(Switzerland) Federer	(United Kingdom) Murray	Overall	Win %
(Serbia) Novak Djokovic		31–29	27–23	25–11	83–63	56.8%
(Spain) Rafael Nadal	29–31		24–16	17–7	70–54	56.5%
(Switzerland) Roger Federer	23–27	16–24		14–11	53–62	46.1%
(United Kingdom) Andy Murray	11–25	7–17	11–14		29–56	34.1%

Despite losing record in matches, Federer had a better head-to-head record against Djokovic in games (758–749) and points (4729–4695) played.

=== Big Four vs. Other Players ===
The Big Four have collectively won 69 Grand Slam titles (Djokovic winning record 24, Nadal 22, Federer 20 and Murray 3) since 2003 Australian Open. Since Big Four's dominance in 2004 Australian Open, the only other players who have Grand Slam titles are Gastón Gaudio (2004 French Open), Marat Safin (2005 Australian Open), Juan Martín del Potro (2009 US Open), Stan Wawrinka (2014 Australian Open, 2015 French Open, 2016 US Open), Marin Čilić (2014 US Open), Dominic Thiem (2020 US Open), Daniil Medvedev (2021 US Open), Carlos Alcaraz (2022 US Open, 2023 Wimbledon, 2024 French Open, 2024 Wimbledon, 2025 French Open, 2025 US Open, 2026 Australian Open) and Jannik Sinner (2024 Australian Open, 2024 US Open, 2025 Australian Open, 2025 Wimbledon). Their combined record at Grand Slam against everyone else is 1285–217 (85.6%) in career. Moreover, only 6 times has a player outside the group beaten two of them in the same Grand Slam (Safin at the 2005 Australian Open, Tsonga at the 2008 Australian Open, del Potro at the 2009 US Open, Berdych at the 2010 Wimbledon, Wawrinka at the 2014 Australian Open and 2015 French Open). Stan Wawrinka, Jo-Wilfried Tsonga and Tomáš Berdych are the only players to have beaten each member of the Big Four at Grand Slam.

Wins over each member of the Big Four at Grand Slam

- Stan Wawrinka, 10 wins (defeated Murray at the 2010 and 2013 US Open and 2017 and 2020 French Open; Nadal at the 2014 Australian Open; Federer at the 2015 French Open; and Djokovic at the 2014 Australian Open, 2015 French Open and 2016 and 2019 US Open)
- Tomáš Berdych, 6 wins (defeated Murray at the 2010 French Open; Federer at the 2010 Wimbledon and 2012 US Open; Djokovic at the 2010 and 2017 Wimbledon; and Nadal at the 2015 Australian Open)
- Jo-Wilfried Tsonga, 5 wins (defeated Murray and Nadal at the 2008 Australian Open; Djokovic at the 2010 Australian Open; and Federer at the 2011 Wimbledon and at the 2013 French Open)

Wins over three members of the Big Four at Grand Slam

- Fernando Verdasco, 4 wins (defeated Djokovic at the 2005 US Open; Murray at the 2009 Australian Open and the 2018 US Open; and Nadal at the 2016 Australian Open)
- Andy Roddick, 3 wins (defeated Nadal at the 2004 US Open; Djokovic at the 2009 Australian Open; and Murray at the 2009 Wimbledon)
- Marin Čilić, 3 wins (defeated Murray at the 2009 US Open; Federer at the 2014 US Open; and Nadal at the 2018 Australian Open)

Wins over two members of the Big Four at a Grand Slam event

- Juan Martín del Potro, 4 wins (defeated Nadal and Federer at the 2009 US Open; Federer at the 2017 US Open; and Nadal at the 2018 US Open)
- Marat Safin, 2 wins (defeated Djokovic and Federer at the 2005 Australian Open)
- Tomáš Berdych, 2 wins (defeated Federer and Djokovic at the 2010 Wimbledon)
- Kei Nishikori, 2 wins (defeated Djokovic at the 2014 US Open and Murray at the 2016 US Open)
- Grigor Dimitrov, 2 wins (defeated Murray at the 2014 Wimbledon and Federer at the 2019 US Open)

Only 4 players have defeated three of the Big Four at the same events. Two of players are members of the Big Four: Nadal who defeated Murray in the round of 16, Djokovic in the semifinals, and Federer in the final to win the 2008 Hamburg; and Federer who defeated Murray in the round robin round, Djokovic in the semifinals and Nadal in the finals to win the 2010 ATP Finals. Only two other players to have achieved this trifecta are:

- David Nalbandian (defeated Nadal in the quarterfinals, Djokovic in the semifinals, and Federer in the finals to win the 2007 Madrid)
- Jo-Wilfried Tsonga (defeated Djokovic in the round of 16, Murray in the quarterfinals, and Federer in the finals to win the 2014 Toronto)

Only 4 players have beaten a member of the Big Four in Grand Slam finals. The first to do so was del Potro when he defeated Federer in the 2009 US Open finals. Wawrinka defeated Nadal in the 2014 Australian Open finals and Djokovic in the 2015 Roland Garros and 2016 US Open finals. Medvedev defeated Djokovic in the 2021 US Open finals, and Alcaraz defeated Djokovic in the 2023, 2024 Wimbledon and 2026 Australian Open finals. In all cases, except Alcaraz, they defeated the world No. 1 in the process.

The Big Four have played in 100 events where all four have competed. Collectively, they have won 88 of 100 events (88%). Of the 12 events, they failed to win, they were runner-up in 6 of 12 events and 5 of 12 events occurred prior to them first being seeded as the top 4 players (latter of 2008 US Open). Since then, the Big Four have won 59 of 66 events (89.4%). Starting with the 2010 Rome Masters, they had won 31 consecutive events where all four were present, until 2014 Australian Open.

Only 7 players have managed to win events where all four of the Big Four have competed:

- Andy Roddick (2006 Cincinnati, 2008 Dubai, 2010 Miami)
- David Nalbandian (2007 Madrid, 2007 Paris)
- Nikolay Davydenko (2008 Miami, 2009 ATP Finals)
- Jo-Wilfried Tsonga (2008 Paris)
- Juan Martín del Potro (2009 US Open)
- Ivan Ljubičić (2010 Indian Wells)
- Stan Wawrinka (2014 Australian Open, 2015 French Open)

The Big Four's dominance is also high when only three of the Big Four have competed in the same events. Of 49 events where this has occurred, they have won 43 of 49 events (87.8%). Since 2008, they have won 32 of 37 events (86.5%).

Only 23 players have recorded at least 4 or more victories over each member of the Big Four combined. Of these players, only Félix Auger-Aliassime holds the lead record against all four combined.

Between 2004 to 2023, other players won 11 Grand Slam titles of 79, 55 Masters 1000 titles of 172, 7 ATP Finals of 20, Olympics gold 3 of 5.

Top-level tournament records (2004 Australian Open – 2023 ATP Finals)

Player	Grand Slams	ATP Masters 1000	ATP Finals	Olympics	Total
Big Four	68	117	13	3	201 (72.8%)
Other Players	11	55	7	2	75 (27.2%)

== Rankings ==
Between 8 September 2008 and 28 January 2013, the top four positions in the ATP rankings were occupied by all members of the Big Four for all but 16 weeks. Roger Federer, Rafael Nadal and Novak Djokovic were consistently in the top four for this period, with Andy Murray dropping to world No. 5 during all 16 of those weeks. The only two other players who entered the top four in this period were Juan Martín del Potro (3 weeks) and Robin Söderling (13 weeks). This run was ended when David Ferrer replaced Nadal in the top four following a period of injury for Nadal, and retained his place in the top four for much of 2013 as Roger Federer dropped down the rankings due to his own back injury problems.

All four have been world No. 1. Federer first reached world No. 1 in 2004 after winning his first Australian Open, whereas Nadal did in 2008 following his Olympics victory after three straight years of ending the year ranked world No. 2, behind Federer. Similarly, Djokovic achieved world No. 1 status following his Wimbledon victory in 2011, after four consecutive years at No. 3, in a season which is regarded as one of the greatest in the history of the sport. Murray reached world No. 1 after 2016 Paris on 7 November 2016, towards the end of a season in which he had made three Grand Slam finals (winning 2016 Wimbledon), as well as winning Olympic Games and three Masters 1000 events.

=== Combined ranking timeline (best result) ===
- Since the first year-end No. 1 finish.

ATP rankings	2004	2005	2006	2007	2008	2009	2010	2011	2012	2013	2014	2015	2016	2017	2018	2019	2020	2021	2022	2023	2024	2025	2026	Total Years	Total Weeks
ATP rankings	1^{F}	1^{F}	1^{F}	1^{F}	1^{N}	1^{F}	1^{N}	1^{D}	1^{D}	1^{N}	1^{D}	1^{D}	1^{M}	1^{N}	**1**^{D}	1^{N}	1^{D}	1^{D}	2^{N}	1^{D}	7^{D}	4^{D}		19	988
Year-ends at No. 1						5^{F}							1^{M}			5^{N}				8^{D}				19	988
Weeks at No. 1														41^{M}	310^{F}		209^{N}				428^{D}			19	988

Outright records indicated in bold.

=== Year-end ranking timeline by year ===
Note: rank is at the end of the season or when the player is last ranked in the season.

Year-end ranking	1998	1999	2000	2001	2002	2003	2004	2005	2006	2007	2008	2009	2010	2011	2012	2013	2014	2015	2016	2017	2018	2019	2020	2021	2022	2023	2024	2025	2026
(Switzerland) Roger Federer	301	64	29	13	6	2	**1**	**1**	**1**	**1**	2	**1**	2	3	2	6	2	3	16	2	3	3	5	16	97	retired			
(Spain) Rafael Nadal	none			811	200	49	51	2	2	2	**1**	2	**1**	2	4	**1**	3	5	9	**1**	2	**1**	2	6	2	670	154	retired	
(Serbia) Novak Djokovic	none					679	186	78	16	3	3	3	3	**1**	**1**	2	**1**	**1**	2	12	**1**	2	**1**	**1**	5	**1**	7	4	
(United Kingdom) Andy Murray	none					540	411	63	17	11	4	4	4	4	3	4	6	2	**1**	16	240	125	122	134	49	42	160	retired	

On 23 September 2022, Federer retired from professional tennis at the 2022 Laver Cup. He played this last ATP event with protected ranking 9, however he was last ranked 97 at the starting week of 2022 Wimbledon in the ATP rankings.

On 27 July 2024, Murray retired from professional tennis at the 2024 Olympics. Last ranking recorded on 12 August 2024.

On 19 November 2024, Nadal retired from professional tennis at the 2024 Davis Cup. Last year-end ranking recorded on 2 December 2024.

=== Year-end ranking timeline by age at end of season ===
Year-end ranking	17	18	19	20	21	22	23	24	25	26	27	28	29	30	31	32	33	34	35	36	37	38	39	40	41
(Switzerland) Roger Federer	301	64	29	13	6	2	**1**	**1**	**1**	**1**	2	**1**	2	3	2	6	2	3	16	2	3	3	5	16	97
(Spain) Rafael Nadal	49	51	2	2	2	**1**	2	**1**	2	4	**1**	3	5	9	**1**	2	**1**	2	6	2	670	154	retired		
(Serbia) Novak Djokovic	186	78	16	3	3	3	3	**1**	**1**	2	**1**	**1**	2	12	**1**	2	**1**	**1**	5	**1**	7	4			
(United Kingdom) Andy Murray	411	63	17	11	4	4	4	4	3	4	6	2	**1**	16	240	125	122	134	49	42	160	retired			

=== Big Four ATP world No. 1 era ===
Player	Start date	End date	Weeks	Total
(Switzerland) Roger Federer	2 February 2004	17 August 2008	237^{‡}	237
(Spain) Rafael Nadal	18 August 2008	5 July 2009	46	283
(Switzerland) Roger Federer (2)	6 July 2009	6 June 2010	48	331
(Spain) Rafael Nadal (2)	7 June 2010	3 July 2011	56	387
(Serbia) Novak Djokovic	4 July 2011	8 July 2012	53	440
(Switzerland) Roger Federer (3)	9 July 2012	4 November 2012	17	457
(Serbia) Novak Djokovic (2)	5 November 2012	6 October 2013	48	505
(Spain) Rafael Nadal (3)	7 October 2013	6 July 2014	39	544
(Serbia) Novak Djokovic (3)	7 July 2014	6 November 2016	122	666
(United Kingdom) Andy Murray	7 November 2016	20 August 2017	41	707
(Spain) Rafael Nadal (4)	21 August 2017	18 February 2018	26	733
(Switzerland) Roger Federer (4)	19 February 2018	1 April 2018	6	739
(Spain) Rafael Nadal (5)	2 April 2018	13 May 2018	6	745
(Switzerland) Roger Federer (5)	14 May 2018	20 May 2018	1	746
(Spain) Rafael Nadal (6)	21 May 2018	17 June 2018	4	750
(Switzerland) Roger Federer (6)	18 June 2018	24 June 2018	1	751
(Spain) Rafael Nadal (7)	25 June 2018	4 November 2018	19	770
(Serbia) Novak Djokovic (4)	5 November 2018	3 November 2019	52	822
(Spain) Rafael Nadal (8)	4 November 2019	2 February 2020	13	835
(Serbia) Novak Djokovic (5)	3 February 2020	23 March 2020	7	842
Rankings frozen	23 March 2020	23 August 2020	22	22
(Serbia) Novak Djokovic (5)	24 August 2020	27 February 2022	79	921
(Serbia) Novak Djokovic (6)	21 March 2022	12 June 2022	12	933
(Serbia) Novak Djokovic (7)	30 January 2023	19 March 2023	7	940
(Serbia) Novak Djokovic (8)	3 April 2023	21 May 2023	7	947
(Serbia) Novak Djokovic (9)	12 June 2023	25 June 2023	2	949
(Serbia) Novak Djokovic (10)	11 September 2023	9 June 2024	39	988
Total Weeks	2 February 2004	9 June 2024	988	

^{‡}Represents ATP rankings record.

=== Top 4 time spans ===
==== Top 1 ====
Time spans Big 4 held the Top 1 ATP ranking position.

Start date	End date	Weeks
2 February 2004	27 February 2022	921
Total		921

After Federer became No. 1 on 2 February 2004, the Big 4 member holding the No. 1 ranking changed 24 times.

==== Top 2 ====
Time spans Big 4 held the Top 2 ATP ranking positions.

Start date	End date	Weeks
25 July 2005	18 March 2013	396
13 May 2013	8 March 2021	397
Total		793

Spans per pair:

Pair	Start date	End date	Weeks	Total Weeks
Djokovic–Federer	13 September 2010	7 March 2011	25	293
Djokovic–Nadal	21 March 2011	25 June 2012	66	360
Djokovic–Federer	9 July 2012	18 March 2013	36	396
Murray	13 May 2013	12 August 2013	13	409
Nadal–Djokovic	19 August 2013	23 June 2014	44	444
Nadal–Federer	7 July 2014	5 October 2015	65	511
Murray–Federer	12 October 2015	2 November 2015	3	515
Murray–Djokovic	9 November 2015	29 May 2017	81	597
Nadal–Murray	12 June 2017	28 August 2017	11	610
Federer–Nadal	11 September 2017	19 March 2018	27	639
Federer–Nadal	2 April 2018	18 June 2018	11	652
Federer–Djokovic	25 June 2018	29 October 2018	18	671
Nadal–Djokovic	5 November 2018	20 January 2020	63	735
Nadal	3 February 2020	8 March 2021	57	793

==== Top 3 ====
Time spans Big 4 held the Top 3 ATP ranking positions.

Start date	End date	Weeks
13 August 2007	28 June 2010	148
16 August 2010	11 October 2010	8
18 October 2010	7 May 2012	80
21 May 2012	24 June 2013	57
12 August 2013	7 October 2013	8
7 July 2014	23 March 2015	37
24 August 2015	26 October 2015	9
9 November 2015	15 August 2016	39
17 July 2017	30 October 2017	15
10 September 2018	14 January 2019	18
Total		419

Spans per pair:

Pair	Start date	End date	Weeks	Total Weeks
Djokovic–Murray	13 August 2007	10 August 2009	104	104
Nadal–Murray	17 August 2009	12 October 2009	8	113
Djokovic–Murray	19 October 2009	8 February 2010	16	130
Nadal–Murray	15 February 2010	29 March 2010	6	137
Nadal–Djokovic	5 April 2010	28 June 2010	11	149
Djokovic–Federer	16 August 2010	11 October 2010	8	157
Djokovic–Federer	18 October 2010	10 October 2011	51	208
Murray–Federer	17 October 2011	7 May 2012	29	238
Federer–Nadal	21 May 2012	27 August 2012	14	252
Murray–Federer	10 September 2012	24 June 2013	41	293
Nadal–Murray	12 August 2013	7 October 2013	8	301
Federer–Nadal	7 July 2014	23 March 2015	37	338
Murray–Federer	24 August 2015	26 October 2015	9	347
Federer–Murray	9 November 2015	9 May 2016	26	373
Federer	16 May 2016	15 August 2016	13	386
Federer–Murray	17 July 2017	30 October 2017	15	401
Djokovic–Federer	10 September 2018	14 January 2019	18	419

==== Top 4 ====
Time spans Big 4 held the Top 4 ATP ranking positions.

Start date	End date	Weeks
8 September 2008	4 January 2010	69
18 January 2010	12 April 2010	12
4 April 2011	14 January 2013	93
2 February 2015	23 February 2015	4
9 March 2015	23 March 2015	3
22 August 2016	3 October 2016	6
3 April 2017	24 July 2017	16
Total		203

Spans per pair:

Pair	Start date	End date	Weeks	Total Weeks
Djokovic–Murray	8 September 2008	4 January 2010	69	69
Murray–Nadal	18 January 2010	12 April 2010	12	81
Murray–Federer	4 April 2011	21 November 2011	33	114
Murray–Nadal	28 November 2011	14 January 2013	59	174
Federer–Murray	2 February 2015	23 March 2015	7	181
Federer–Nadal	22 August 2016	3 October 2016	6	187
Federer–Nadal	3 April 2017	29 May 2017	8	195
Djokovic	12 June 2017	24 July 2017	6	203

=== Weeks in Top 4 ===
Player	No. 1	No. 2	No. 3	No. 4	Total
(Switzerland) Roger Federer	310	218	222^{3}	54	804
(Spain) Rafael Nadal	209	387^{2}	90	70	756
(Serbia) Novak Djokovic	**428^{1}**	171	165	65	829^{5}
(United Kingdom) Andy Murray	41	79	106	181^{4}	407

^{1} Most weeks at No. 1 record
^{2} Most weeks at No. 2 record
^{3} Most weeks at No. 3 record
^{4} Most weeks at No. 4 record
^{5} Most weeks in Top 4 record

=== Career Grand Slam events 1st seedings ===
Djokovic has been seeded 1st in 33 Grand Slam events, Federer (24), Nadal (16) and Murray (3).

Year	(Australia) Australian Open	(France) French Open	(United Kingdom) Wimbledon	(United States) US Open
2004	(United States) Roddick (1)	(Switzerland) Federer (1)	(Switzerland) Federer (2)	(Switzerland) Federer (3)
2005	(Switzerland) Federer (4)	(Switzerland) Federer (5)	(Switzerland) Federer (6)	(Switzerland) Federer (7)
2006	(Switzerland) Federer (8)	(Switzerland) Federer (9)	(Switzerland) Federer (10)	(Switzerland) Federer (11)
2007	(Switzerland) Federer (12)	(Switzerland) Federer (13)	(Switzerland) Federer (14)	(Switzerland) Federer (15)
2008	(Switzerland) Federer (16)	(Switzerland) Federer (17)	(Switzerland) Federer (18)	(Spain) Nadal (1)
2009	(Spain) Nadal (2)	(Spain) Nadal (3)	(Spain) Nadal **^{1}** (4)	(Switzerland) Federer (19)
2010	(Switzerland) Federer (20)	(Switzerland) Federer (21)	(Switzerland) Federer **^{2}** (22)	(Spain) Nadal (5)
2011	(Spain) Nadal (6)	(Spain) Nadal (7)	(Spain) Nadal (8)	(Serbia) Djokovic (1)
2012	(Serbia) Djokovic (2)	(Serbia) Djokovic (3)	(Serbia) Djokovic (4)	(Switzerland) Federer (23)
2013	(Serbia) Djokovic (5)	(Serbia) Djokovic (6)	(Serbia) Djokovic (7)	(Serbia) Djokovic (8)
2014	(Spain) Nadal (9)	(Spain) Nadal (10)	(Serbia) Djokovic **^{2}** (9)	(Serbia) Djokovic (10)
2015	(Serbia) Djokovic (11)	(Serbia) Djokovic (12)	(Serbia) Djokovic (13)	(Serbia) Djokovic (14)
2016	(Serbia) Djokovic (15)	(Serbia) Djokovic (16)	(Serbia) Djokovic (17)	(Serbia) Djokovic (18)
2017	(United Kingdom) Murray (1)	(United Kingdom) Murray (2)	(United Kingdom) Murray (3)	(Spain) Nadal (11)
2018	(Spain) Nadal (12)	(Spain) Nadal (13)	(Switzerland) Federer **^{2}** (24)	(Spain) Nadal (14)
2019	(Serbia) Djokovic (19)	(Serbia) Djokovic (20)	(Serbia) Djokovic (21)	(Serbia) Djokovic (22)
2020	(Spain) Nadal (15)	(Serbia) Djokovic (24)	Tournament cancelled	(Serbia) Djokovic (23)
2021	(Serbia) Djokovic (25)	(Serbia) Djokovic (26)	(Serbia) Djokovic (27)	(Serbia) Djokovic (28)
2022	(Serbia) Djokovic **^{3}** (29)	(Serbia) Djokovic (30)	(Serbia) Djokovic (31)	(Russia) Medvedev (1)
2023	(Spain) Nadal (16)	(Spain) Alcaraz (1)	(Spain) Alcaraz (2)	(Spain) Alcaraz (3)
2024	(Serbia) Djokovic (32)	(Serbia) Djokovic (33)	(Italy) Sinner (1)	(Italy) Sinner (2)
2025	(Italy) Sinner (3)	(Italy) Sinner (4)	(Italy) Sinner (5)	(Italy) Sinner (6)
2026	(Spain) Alcaraz (4)	(Italy) Sinner (7)	(Italy) Sinner (8)	(Germany) Zverev (1)
2027				

^{[1]} Nadal was seeded #1 but withdrew from the events after the draw was released.

^{[2]} Seeded first ahead of Nadal despite their world rankings being reversed, this was due to Wimbledon's grass seedings formula.

^{[3]} Djokovic was seeded #1 but withdrew from the events after the draw was released.

== Overall performances ==
Current through the 2026 US Open.

- The match win% includes matches of ITF team competitions: Olympics, Davis Cup, Hopman Cup and ATP team competitions: Laver Cup, ATP Cup, United Cup

Player	Singles			Doubles and Mixed Doubles			Total		
Player	Titles	Finals	Match Win %	Titles	Finals	Match Win %	Titles	Finals	Match Win %
(Switzerland) Roger Federer	103	157	81% (1316–312)	8	14	61% (178–113)	111	171	78% (1494–425)
(Spain) Rafael Nadal	92	131	82% (1180–264)	11	15	64% (154–86)	103	146	79% (1334–350)
(Serbia) Novak Djokovic	101	145	83% (1292–267)	1	3	47% (89–102)	102	148	79% (1381–369)
(United Kingdom) Andy Murray	46	71	74% (856–305)	3	6	50% (104–103)	49	77	70% (960–408)
Total	342	504	80% (4644–1148)	23	38	57% (525–404)	365	542	77% (5169–1552)

== Grand Slam performances ==
Current through the 2026 US Open.

Player	AO			RG			WIM			USO		
Player	Titles	Finals	Win %	Titles	Finals	Win %	Titles	Finals	Win %	Titles	Finals	Win %
(Switzerland) Roger Federer	6	7	87% (102–15)	1	5	81% (73–17)	**8**	**12**	88% (105–14)	**5**	7	86% (89–14)
(Spain) Rafael Nadal	2	6	83% (77–16)	**14**	**14**	97% (112–4)	2	5	83% (58–12)	4	5	85% (67–12)
(Serbia) Novak Djokovic	**10**	**11**	90% (104–11)	3	7	86% (103–18)	7	10	88% (107–14)	4	**10**	86% (95–16)
(United Kingdom) Andy Murray	0	5	76% (51–16)	0	1	76% (39–12)	2	3	82% (61–13)	1	2	75% (49–16)
Total	18	29	85% (334–58)	18	27	87% (327–51)	19	29	86% (331–53)	14	24	84% (300–58)

=== Grand Slam events performance comparison ===
Before 2005, Murray and Djokovic had not competed in a Grand Slam events. Nadal had made four appearances during 2003 to 2004, reaching the third round at 2003 Wimbledon and 2004 Australian Open. Federer had been competing in Grand Slam events since 1999, and had won Wimbledon in 2003 and 2004, as well as the 2004 Australian Open and 2004 US Open.

==== 2003–2008 ====
**Player**
**Player**	**2003**				**2004**				**2005**				**2006**				**2007**				**2008**			
**Player**	AUS	RG	WIM	US	AUS	RG	WIM	US	AUS	RG	WIM	US	AUS	RG	WIM	US	AUS	RG	WIM	US	AUS	RG	WIM	US
(Switzerland) Roger Federer	4R	1R	**W**	4R	**W**	3R	**W**	**W**	SF	SF^{N}	**W**	**W**	**W**	F^{N}	**W^{N}**	**W**	**W^{D}**	F^{N}	**W^{N}**	**W^{D}**	SF^{D}	F^{N}	F^{N}	**W^{DM}**
(Spain) Rafael Nadal	A	A	3R	2R	3R	A	A	2R	4R	**W^{F}**	2R	3R	A	**W^{DF}**	F^{F}	QF	QF^{M}	**W^{DF}**	F^{DF}	4R	SF	**W^{DF}**	**W^{F}**	SF^{M}
(Serbia) Novak Djokovic	A	A	A	A	A	A	A	A	1R	2R	3R	3R	1R	QF^{N}	4R	3R	4R^{F}	SF^{N}	SF^{N}	F^{F}	**W^{F}**	SF^{N}	2R	SF^{F}
(United Kingdom) Andy Murray	A	A	A	A	A	A	A	A	A	A	3R	2R	1R	1R	4R	4R	4R^{N}	A	A	3R	1R	3R	QF^{N}	F^{NF}

==== 2009–2014 ====
**Player**
**Player**	**2009**				**2010**				**2011**				**2012**				**2013**				**2014**			
**Player**	AUS	RG	WIM	US	AUS	RG	WIM	US	AUS	RG	WIM	US	AUS	RG	WIM	US	AUS	RG	WIM	US	AUS	RG	WIM	US
(Switzerland) Roger Federer	F^{N}	**W**	**W**	F^{D}	**W^{M}**	QF	QF	SF^{D}	SF^{D}	F^{DN}	QF	SF^{D}	SF^{N}	SF^{D}	**W^{DM}**	QF	SF^{M}	QF	2R	4R	SF^{MN}	4R	F^{D}	SF
(Spain) Rafael Nadal	**W^{F}**	4R	A	SF	QF^{M}	**W**	**W^{M}**	**W^{D}**	QF	**W^{MF}**	F^{MD}	F^{MD}	F^{FD}	**W^{D}**	2R	A	A	**W^{D}**	1R	**W^{D}**	F^{F}	**W^{MD}**	4R	A
(Serbia) Novak Djokovic	QF	3R	QF	SF^{F}	QF	QF	SF	F^{FN}	**W^{FM}**	SF^{F}	**W^{N}**	**W^{FN}**	**W^{MN}**	F^{FN}	SF^{F}	F^{M}	**W^{M}**	SF^{N}	F^{M}	F^{N}	QF	F^{N}	**W^{F}**	SF^{M}
(United Kingdom) Andy Murray	4R	QF	SF	4R	F^{NF}	4R	SF^{N}	3R	F^{D}	SF^{N}	SF^{N}	SF^{N}	SF^{D}	QF	F^{F}	**W^{D}**	F^{FD}	A	**W^{D}**	QF	QF^{F}	SF^{N}	QF	QF^{D}

==== 2015–2020 ====
**Player**
**Player**	**2015**				**2016**				**2017**				**2018**				**2019**				**2020**			
**Player**	AUS	RG	WIM	US	AUS	RG	WIM	US	AUS	RG	WIM	US	AUS	RG	WIM	US	AUS	RG	WIM	US	AUS	WIM	US	RG
(Switzerland) Roger Federer	3R	QF	F^{MD}	F^{D}	SF^{D}	A	SF	A	**W^{N}**	A	**W**	QF	**W**	A	QF	4R	4R	SF^{N}	F^{ND}	QF	SF^{D}	NH	A	A
(Spain) Rafael Nadal	QF	QF^{D}	2R	3R	1R	3R	A	4R	F^{F}	**W**	4R	**W**	QF	**W**	SF^{D}	SF	F^{D}	**W^{F}**	SF^{F}	**W**	QF	NH	A	**W^{D}**
(Serbia) Novak Djokovic	**W^{M}**	F^{NM}	**W^{F}**	**W^{F}**	**W^{FM}**	**W^{M}**	3R	F	2R	QF	QF	A	4R	QF	**W^{N}**	**W**	**W^{N}**	SF	**W^{F}**	4R	**W^{F}**	NH	4R	F^{N}
(United Kingdom) Andy Murray	F^{D}	SF^{D}	SF^{F}	4R	F^{D}	F^{D}	**W**	QF	4R	SF	QF	A	A	A	A	2R	1R	A	A	A	A	NH	2R	1R

==== 2021–2026 ====
**Player**
**Player**	**2021**				**2022**				**2023**				**2024**				**2025**				**2026**				**2027**			
**Player**	AUS	RG	WIM	US	AUS	RG	WIM	US	AUS	RG	WIM	US	AUS	RG	WIM	US	AUS	RG	WIM	US	AUS	RG	WIM	US	AUS	RG	WIM	US
(Switzerland) Roger Federer	A	4R	QF	A	A	A	A	A	retired																			
(Spain) Rafael Nadal	QF	SF^{D}	A	A	**W**	**W**^{D}	SF	4R	2R	A	A	A	A	1R	A	A	retired											
(Serbia) Novak Djokovic	**W**	**W^{N}**	**W**	F	A	QF^{N}	**W**	A	**W**	**W**	F	**W**	SF	QF	F	3R	SF	SF	SF	SF	F	3R	SF	1R				
(United Kingdom) Andy Murray	A	A	3R	1R	2R	A	2R	3R	3R	A	2R	2R	1R	1R	A	retired												

^{D} indicates the player met Novak Djokovic at that events
^{F} indicates the player met Roger Federer at that events
^{M} indicates the player met Andy Murray at that events
^{N} indicates the player met Rafael Nadal at that events

=== Grand Slam events performance comparison by age ===
Note: age is at the end of the season

==== 17–22 ====
**Player**	**17**				**18**				**19**				**20**				**21**				**22**			
**Player**	AUS	RG	WIM	US	AUS	RG	WIM	US	AUS	RG	WIM	US	AUS	RG	WIM	US	AUS	RG	WIM	US	AUS	RG	WIM	US
(Switzerland) Roger Federer	A	A	A	A	A	1R	1R	A	3R	4R	1R	4R	3R	QF	QF	4R	4R	1R	1R	4R	4R	1R	**W**	4R
(Spain) Rafael Nadal	A	A	3R	2R	3R	A	A	2R	4R	**W^{F}**	2R	3R	A	**W^{DF}**	F^{F}	QF	QF^{M}	**W^{DF}**	F^{DF}	4R	SF	**W^{DF}**	**W^{F}**	SF^{M}
(Serbia) Novak Djokovic	A	A	A	A	1R	2R	3R	3R	1R	QF^{N}	4R	3R	4R^{F}	SF^{N}	SF^{N}	F^{F}	**W^{F}**	SF^{N}	2R	SF^{F}	QF	3R	QF	SF^{F}
(United Kingdom) Andy Murray	A	A	A	A	A	A	3R	2R	1R	1R	4R	4R	4R^{N}	A	A	3R	1R	3R	QF^{N}	F^{NF}	4R	QF	SF	4R

==== 23–28 ====
**Player**	**23**				**24**				**25**				**26**				**27**				**28**			
**Player**	AUS	RG	WIM	US	AUS	RG	WIM	US	AUS	RG	WIM	US	AUS	RG	WIM	US	AUS	RG	WIM	US	AUS	RG	WIM	US
(Switzerland) Roger Federer	**W**	3R	**W**	**W**	SF	SF^{N}	**W**	**W**	**W**	F^{N}	**W^{N}**	**W**	**W^{D}**	F^{N}	**W^{N}**	**W^{D}**	SF^{D}	F^{N}	F^{N}	**W^{DM}**	F^{N}	**W**	**W**	F^{D}
(Spain) Rafael Nadal	**W^{F}**	4R	A	SF	QF^{M}	**W**	**W^{M}**	**W^{D}**	QF	**W^{MF}**	F^{MD}	F^{MD}	F^{FD}	**W^{D}**	2R	A	A	**W^{D}**	1R	**W^{D}**	F^{F}	**W^{MD}**	4R	A
(Serbia) Novak Djokovic	QF	QF	SF	F^{FN}	**W^{FM}**	SF^{F}	**W^{N}**	**W^{FN}**	**W^{MN}**	F^{FN}	SF^{F}	F^{M}	**W^{M}**	SF^{N}	F^{M}	F^{N}	QF	F^{N}	**W^{F}**	SF^{M}	**W^{M}**	F^{NM}	**W^{F}**	**W^{F}**
(United Kingdom) Andy Murray	F^{NF}	4R	SF^{N}	3R	F^{D}	SF^{N}	SF^{N}	SF^{N}	SF^{D}	QF	F^{F}	**W^{D}**	F^{FD}	A	**W^{D}**	QF	QF^{F}	SF^{N}	QF	QF^{D}	F^{D}	SF^{D}	SF^{F}	4R

==== 29–34 ====
**Player**	**29**				**30**				**31**				**32**				**33**				**34**			
**Player**	AUS	RG	WIM	US	AUS	RG	WIM	US	AUS	RG	WIM	US	AUS	RG	WIM	US	AUS	RG	WIM	US	AUS	RG	WIM	US
(Switzerland) Roger Federer	**W^{M}**	QF	QF	SF^{D}	SF^{D}	F^{DN}	QF	SF^{D}	SF^{N}	SF^{D}	**W^{DM}**	QF	SF^{M}	QF	2R	4R	SF^{MN}	4R	F^{D}	SF	3R	QF	F^{MD}	F^{D}
(Spain) Rafael Nadal	QF	QF^{D}	2R	3R	1R	3R	A	4R	F^{F}	**W**	4R	**W**	QF	**W**	SF^{D}	SF	F^{D}	**W^{F}**	SF^{F}	**W**	QF	**W^{D}**	NH	A
(Serbia) Novak Djokovic	**W^{FM}**	**W^{M}**	3R	F	2R	QF	QF	A	4R	QF	**W^{N}**	**W**	**W^{N}**	SF	**W^{F}**	4R	**W^{F}**	F^{N}	NH	4R	**W**	**W^{N}**	**W**	F
(United Kingdom) Andy Murray	F^{D}	F^{D}	**W**	QF	4R	SF	QF	A	A	A	A	2R	1R	A	A	A	A	1R	NH	2R	A	A	3R	1R

==== 35–41 ====
**Player**	**35**				**36**				**37**				**38**				**39**				**40**				**41**			
**Player**	AUS	RG	WIM	US	AUS	RG	WIM	US	AUS	RG	WIM	US	AUS	RG	WIM	US	AUS	RG	WIM	US	AUS	RG	WIM	US	AUS	RG	WIM	US
(Switzerland) Roger Federer	SF^{D}	A	SF	A	**W^{N}**	A	**W**	QF	**W**	A	QF	4R	4R	SF^{N}	F^{ND}	QF	SF^{D}	A	NH	A	A	4R	QF	A	A	A	A	A
(Spain) Rafael Nadal	QF	SF^{D}	A	A	**W**	**W**^{D}	SF	4R	2R	A	A	A	A	1R	A	A	retired											
(Serbia) Novak Djokovic	A	QF^{N}	**W**	A	**W**	**W**	F	**W**	SF	QF	F	3R	SF	SF	SF	SF	F	3R	SF	1R								
(United Kingdom) Andy Murray	2R	A	2R	3R	3R	A	2R	2R	1R	1R	A	retired																

^{D} indicates the player met Novak Djokovic at that events
^{F} indicates the player met Roger Federer at that events
^{M} indicates the player met Andy Murray at that events
^{N} indicates the player met Rafael Nadal at that events

=== Career finals performance comparison ===
Current through the 2026 US Open.

**Player**	Grand Slam		ATP Finals		ATP Masters		ATP Tour 500		ATP Tour 250		Olympics		Total	
**Player**	Titles	Finals	Titles	Finals	Titles	Finals	Titles	Finals	Titles	Finals	Titles	Finals	Titles	Finals
(Switzerland) Roger Federer	20	31	6	**10**	28	50	24	31	25	34	0	1	103	157
(Spain) Rafael Nadal	22	30	0	2	36	53	23	29	10	16	1	1	92	131
(Serbia) Novak Djokovic	**24**	**38**	**7**	9	**40**	**60**	15	18	14	19	1	1	101	145
(United Kingdom) Andy Murray	3	11	1	1	14	21	9	10	17	26	**2**	**2**	46	71

Outright record indicated in bold.

== National and international representation ==
ITF team competitions: Olympics, Davis Cup, Hopman Cup and ATP team competitions: Laver Cup, ATP Cup, United Cup

Current as of 2024 Davis Cup

- The United Cup, a mixed–gender team event from 2023, directly replaced now defunct ATP Cup (2020–2022).
- A player being considered as a part of Davis Cup winning team, if he is nominated for the Finals.

=== Overall performance comparison ===
Player	Olympics	Davis Cup	Hopman Cup	Laver Cup	ATP Cup	United Cup	Overall	Win %	Years	Titles
(Switzerland) Roger Federer	20–7	52–18	27–9	8–4	–	–	107–38	73.8%	1999–2022	8
(Spain) Rafael Nadal	19–6	37–6	–	3–4	6–1	0–2	65–20	76.5%	2004–2024	8
(Serbia) Novak Djokovic	22–10	46–16	20–8	2–3	11–1	3–1	104–39	72.7%	2004–2024	4
(United Kingdom) Andy Murray	21–8	42–10	18–8	0–2	–	–	81–28	74.3%	2005–2024	3

=== Performance comparison by events representation ===
Player	Olympics				Davis Cup					Hopman Cup				Laver Cup				ATP Cup/United Cup			
Player	Events	Medals	Match wins	Win %	Nominations	Ties	Titles	Match wins	Win %	Events	Titles	Match wins	Win %	Events	Titles	Match wins	Win %	Events	Titles	Match wins	Win %
(Switzerland) Roger Federer	7	2	20	74% (20–7)	27	27	1	52	74% (52–18)	5	3	27	75% (27–9)	4	3	8	67% (8–4)	not participated			
(Spain) Rafael Nadal	7	2	19	76% (19–6)	21	24	4	37	86% (37–6)	not participated				3	2	3	43% (3–4)	3	0	6	67% (6–3)
(Serbia) Novak Djokovic	8	2	22	69% (22–10)	30	37	1	46	74% (46–16)	4	0	20	71% (20–8)	2	1	2	40% (2–3)	3	1	14	88% (14–2)
(United Kingdom) Andy Murray	9	3	21	72% (21–8)	24	25	1	42	81% (42–10)	4	0	18	69% (18–8)	1	0	0	0% (0–2)	not participated			

== Combined achievements ==
=== All four ===
1. Won 69 of the last 95 Grand Slam (as of the 2026 US Open), this is 72.6% of Grand Slam won since Australian Open in 2003.
2. Represented in finals of 76 of last 95 Grand Slam. This is 80% of Grand Slam won (2003 Australian Open to 2026 Wimbledon Championships).
3. Won every Wimbledon from 2003 to 2022 (20 consecutive titles); furthermore 9 of 16 Wimbledon finals from 2006 to 2022, have been contested by two of the Big Four.
4. 8 of 9 Australian Open finals from 2009 to 2017 (except 2014), have been contested by two of the Big Four.
5. 33 Grand Slam finals featured two from the Big Four, most of any four players.
6. Occupied at least 7 of 8 Grand Slam finalist slots in 6 seasons (2007, 2008, 2011, 2012, 2013 and 2015), including all 20 from 2010 US Open to 2013 Australian Open.
7. Occupied all four semifinals slots on all 4 Grand Slam occasions (2008 US Open, 2011 French Open, 2011 US Open and 2012 Australian Open).
8. Along with Stefan Edberg, they are the only players to reach 5 or more Australian Open finals in Open Era.
9. Consecutively have held the world No. 1 rankings since 2 February 2004 to 27 February 2022.
10. Occupied the world No. 2 rankings between 25 July 2005 to 18 March 2013 and also between 13 May 2013 to 8 March 2021.
11. Won 96 of 112 Masters 1000 events (85.7%) from 2005 Indian Wells to 2017 Madrid.
12. Won 18 consecutive Masters 1000 events from 2014 Cincinnati to 2016 Toronto.
13. All 9 Masters 1000 events won in 2011, 2013 and 2015.
14. Won every Grand Slam, Masters 1000 events and ATP World Tour Finals in 2011 and 2013.
15. Won 6+ of the 9 Masters 1000 events for 12 consecutive years (2005 to 2016).
16. Occupied top 4 in rankings for 5 years, all consecutive (2008 to 2012).
17. The only four players to have reached the semifinals or better at all 9 Masters 1000 events at least once.
18. Ranked in the year-end top 6 every year at age 21 to 29.
19. Consecutively have held year-end No. 1 rankings since 2004 to 2021.

=== Three of the four ===
==== Djokovic, Federer and Nadal ====
1. The top three players of all-time in terms of Grand Slam titles won.
2. The only three players in history to win 8+ titles at single Grand Slam.
3. Won 66 of the last 95 Grand Slam as of the 2026 US Open, which is 69.5% of Grand Slam won since Australian Open in 2003.
4. Won 29 out of 32 Grand Slam from 2005 Australian Open to 2012 US Open, which is 90.6% of Grand Slam won.
5. Represented in 75 of last 95 Grand Slam finals, which is 78.9% of Grand Slam won from 2003 Australian Open to 2026 US Open.
6. Won 18 of last 24 Australian Open titles, which is 75% of Grand Slam won since Australian Open in 2003.
7. Only three players in history to play 20 or more Grand Slam finals. Djokovic has reached 38, Federer 31 and Nadal 30.
8. Only three players in history to play 38 or more Grand Slam semifinals.
9. Only three players in Open Era to have reached finals of every Grand Slam at least 5 times.
10. Only three players in the Open Era to have played 5 or more consecutive Grand Slam finals.
11. Consecutively held world No. 1 ranking from 2 February 2004 to 6 November 2016 (12 years 9 month), and also from 21 August 2017 to 27 February 2022 (4 years 6 month).
12. Occupied top 3 in year-end rankings for 8 seasons, 5 consecutively (2007 to 2011, 2014, 2018 and 2019).
13. The only era in men's tennis where three players have won double digit Grand Slam and Career Grand Slam while playing in same time period.
14. Set or tied the Open Era record for most titles won in all 4 Grand Slam, Djokovic with 10 Australian Open titles, Federer with 8 Wimbledon titles and 5 US Open titles (tied Pete Sampras and Jimmy Connors) and Nadal with 14 French Open titles.
15. Only three players in tennis history to simultaneously hold Grand Slam titles on grass, hard and clay. Nadal achieved this feat from 2008 to 2009 and 2010, Federer in 2008 and 2009, and Djokovic from 2015 to 2016 and from 2019 to 2021 (not held in 2020 Wimbledon).
16. All won ATP Awards, ITF World Champions, Laureus World Sports Award for Sportsman of the Year and ESPY Awards for best male tennis player.
17. Hold all-time top three for match wins at Australian Open and French Open.
18. Hold Open Era top three for number of semifinals and quarterfinals reached at French Open.
19. Hold the top three for number of match wins against top 10 ranked opponents.
20. Hold top eleven spots for number of match wins against top 10 ranked opponents in single season.
21. Top three earliest to clinch year end No. 1 leaders since the ATP rankings started in 1973.
22. Held year-end No. 1 rankings for 12 consecutive years (2004–2015).
23. All three have simultaneously appeared in 13 Grand Slam semifinals (Australian Open 2008 and 2012; Roland Garros 2007, 2008, 2011, 2012 and 2019; Wimbledon 2007 and 2019; US Open 2008, 2009, 2010 and 2011).

==== Djokovic, Murray and Nadal ====
1. Won every Grand Slam, Masters 1000 events and the ATP World Tour Finals in 2013.
2. Won a combined 12 consecutive Rome Masters titles from 2005 to 2016. During this period, Nadal has won 7, Djokovic 4 and Murray 1.

==== Djokovic, Federer and Murray ====
1. Won every Masters 1000 events and ATP World Tour Finals in 2015.
2. Won the ATP World Tour Finals at least once from 2010 to 2016, record 7 consecutive titles. During this period, Djokovic won 4, Federer won 2 and Murray won 1.

==== Nadal, Federer and Murray ====
1. Won men’s singles and doubles Olympics gold medal from 2008 to 2016. During this period, Federer won 1 (2008 doubles), Nadal won 2 (2008 singles, 2016 doubles), Murray won 2 (2012, 2016 singles).

== Main tennis and sports awards ==
Award	2003	2004	2005	2006	2007	2008	2009	2010	2011	2012	2013	2014	2015	2016	2017	2018	2019	2020	2021	2022	2023	2024	2025	2026
ATP Awards
Player of the Year		F	F	F	F	N	F	N	D	D	N	D	D	M	N	D	N	D	D		D			
Most Improved Player			N	D	D																			
Comeback Player of the Year											N				F	D	M							
Newcomer of the Year	N																							
Fans' Favorite		F	F	F	F	F	F	F	F	F	F	F	F	F	F	F	F	F	F	N				
Stefan Edberg Sportsmanship Awards		F	F	F	F	F	F	N	F	F	F	F	F	F	F	N	N	N	N					
Arthur Ashe Humanitarian of the Year				F					N	D	F	M								M				
ITF Awards
ITF World Champions		F	F	F	F	N	F	N	D	D	D	D	D	M	N	D	N	NH	D	N	D			
ITF Champion of Champions																		F						
Davis Cup Commitment Awards										F	D			M								N		
Laureus World Sports Awards^{1}
Sportsman of the Year		F	F	F	F			N	D			D	D		F	D		N				D		
Breakthrough of the Year			N							M														
Comeback of the Year											N				F									
Sporting Icon Awards																						N		
ESPY Awards
Best International Athlete					F	N																		
Best Male Tennis Player			F	F	F	F	F	F	N	D	D	N	D	D	F	F	F	NH	D	N	D			
BBC Sports Personality of the Year
Sports Personality of the Year											M		M	M										
Overseas Sports Personality of the Year			F		F	F			N	D						F								
L'Équipe Champion of Champions
International				F	F	F			N			N				F/N		N		D		D		
Gazzetta Sports Awards
World Sportsman of the Year				F	F	F										F								
Marca
Marca Leyenda						F	N								D									
Flagbearer/Torchbearer at the Summer Olympic Games
Opening ceremony		F	not held			F	not held			D	not held			M/N	not held					not held		N	not held	

^{1}Award shown in the year it honored, not the year it was presented.

== Career evolution ==
This table lists end of season statistics for each member of the Big Four, allowing for comparison at the same age.

- () = active record (Current as of 28 September 2026).

Bold = age leader in completed years.

Current or former record of the Open Era

Age (end of season)		18	19	20	21	22	23	24	25	26	27	28	29	30	31	32	33	34	35	36	37	38	39	40	41
(Switzerland) Federer's season		1999	2000	2001	2002	2003	2004	2005	2006	2007	2008	2009	2010	2011	2012	2013	2014	2015	2016	2017	2018	2019	2020	2021	2022
(Spain) Nadal's season		2004	2005	2006	2007	2008	2009	2010	2011	2012	2013	2014	2015	2016	2017	2018	2019	2020	2021	2022	2023	2024	2025	2026	2027
(Serbia) Djokovic/ (United Kingdom) Murray's season		2005	2006	2007	2008	2009	2010	2011	2012	2013	2014	2015	2016	2017	2018	2019	2020	2021	2022	2023	2024	2025	2026	2027	2028
Grand Slam titles	Federer	0	0	0	0	1	4	6	9	**12**	**13**	**15**	**16**	**16**	**17**	**17**	17	17	17	19	20	20	20	20	20
Grand Slam titles	Nadal	0	**1**	**2**	**3**	**5**	**6**	**9**	**10**	11	**13**	14	14	14	16	**17**	**19**	**20**	20	22	22	22			
Grand Slam titles	Djokovic	0	0	0	1	1	1	4	5	6	7	10	12	12	14	16	17	**20**	**21**	**24**	**24**	**24**	**(24)**		
Grand Slam titles	Murray	0	0	0	0	0	0	0	1	2	2	2	3	3	3	3	3	3	3	3	3				
Grand Slam match wins	Federer	0	7	20	26	39	61	85	112	138	162	188	208	228	247	260	279	297	307	325	339	357	362	369	369
Grand Slam match wins	Nadal	**6**	**19**	**36**	**56**	**80**	**95**	**120**	**143**	157	171	187	198	203	226	247	271	282	291	313	314	314			
Grand Slam match wins	Djokovic	5	14	33	51	66	85	110	134	**158**	**180**	**207**	**228**	**237**	**258**	**280**	**296**	**323**	**334**	**361**	**377**	**397**	(**409**)		
Grand Slam match wins	Murray	3	9	14	26	41	57	78	100	117	134	153	176	188	189	189	190	192	196	200	200				
ATP Masters 1000 titles	Federer	0	0	0	1	1	4	8	12	14	14	16	17	18	21	21	23	24	24	27	27	28	28	28	28
ATP Masters 1000 titles	Nadal	0	**4**	**6**	**9**	**12**	**15**	**18**	**19**	**21**	**26**	**27**	27	28	30	33	35	35	36	36	36	36			
ATP Masters 1000 titles	Djokovic	0	0	2	4	5	5	10	13	16	20	26	**30**	**30**	**32**	**34**	**36**	**37**	**38**	**40**	**40**	**40**	(**40**)		
ATP Masters 1000 titles	Murray	0	0	0	2	4	6	8	8	9	9	11	14	14	14	14	14	14	14	14	14				
All titles	Federer	0	0	1	4	11	22	33	45	**53**	57	61	66	**70**	**76**	77	82	**88**	88	95	**99**	**103**	**103**	**103**	**103**
All titles	Nadal	**1**	**12**	**17**	**23**	**31**	**36**	**43**	**46**	50	**60**	**64**	**67**	69	75	**80**	**84**	86	88	92	92	92			
All titles	Djokovic	0	2	7	11	16	18	28	34	41	48	59	66	68	72	77	81	86	**91**	**98**	**99**	101	(101)		
All titles	Murray	0	1	3	8	14	16	21	24	28	31	35	44	45	45	46	46	46	46	46	46				
Ranking	Federer	64	29	13	6	2	**1**	**1**	**1**	**1**	2	**1**	2	**3**	2	6	2	3	16	2	3	3	5	16	97
Ranking	Nadal	**51**	**2**	**2**	**2**	**1**	2	**1**	2	4	**1**	3	5	9	**1**	**2**	**1**	2	6	2	670	154			
Ranking	Djokovic	78	16	3	3	3	3	**1**	**1**	2	**1**	**1**	2	12	**1**	**2**	**1**	**1**	**5**	**1**	**7**	**4**	**(5)**		
Ranking	Murray	63	17	11	4	4	4	4	3	4	6	2	**1**	16	240	125	122	134	49	42	160				
Weeks at number 1	Federer	0	0	0	0	0	**48**	**100**	**152**	**204**	**237**	**262**	**285**	**285**	**302**	**302**	**302**	302	302	302	310	310	310	310	310
Weeks at number 1	Nadal	0	0	0	0	**19**	46	76	102	102	115	141	141	141	160	196	205	209	209	209	209	209			
Weeks at number 1	Djokovic	0	0	0	0	0	0	26	62	101	127	179	223	223	232	275	301	**353**	**373**	**405**	**428**	**428**	**(428)**		
Weeks at number 1	Murray	0	0	0	0	0	0	0	0	0	0	0	8	41	41	41	41	41	41	41	41				
Win percentage	Federer	42.86	50.50	58.48	62.95	68.21	72.77	76.52	79.44	80.44	80.55	80.81	81.03	81.27	81.60	81.11	81.44	81.65	81.51	81.94	81.99	82.08	82.09	81.98	81.98
Win percentage	Nadal	**60.81**	**76.07**	**78.21**	**79.31**	**81.31**	**81.50**	**82.37**	**82.34**	**82.70**	**83.61**	**83.45**	82.74	82.24	82.45	**82.87**	**83.22**	83.11	83.10	83.10	82.92	82.63			
Win percentage	Djokovic	48.15	62.35	70.35	73.12	75.14	75.52	78.02	79.22	80.44	81.18	82.45	**82.89**	**82.77**	**82.61**	82.68	82.95	**83.25**	**83.35**	**83.62**	**83.51**	**83.31**	**(83.18)**		
Win percentage	Murray	58.33	60.67	66.44	70.45	74.41	73.96	75.12	75.50	76.31	76.11	76.99	78.36	78.07	77.79	77.44	77.26	76.35	75.47	74.57	73.83				
Match wins	Federer	15	51	100	158	236	310	391	483	551	617	678	743	**807**	**878**	**923**	**996**	**1059**	**1080**	**1134**	**1184**	**1237**	**1242**	**1251**	**1251**
Match wins	Nadal	**45**	**124**	**183**	**253**	**335**	**401**	**472**	**541**	**583**	**658**	**706**	**767**	806	874	919	977	1004	1028	1067	1068	1080			
Match wins	Djokovic	13	53	121	185	263	324	394	469	543	604	686	751	783	836	893	934	989	1031	1087	1124	1163	(1177)		
Match wins	Murray	14	54	97	155	221	267	323	379	422	481	552	630	655	662	672	676	691	717	733	739				
Top 10 wins	Federer	1	4	9	19	28	46	61	80	97	104	119	135	145	161	165	182	197	198	212	216	224	224	224	224
Top 10 wins	Nadal	**4**	**9**	**19**	**30**	**47**	**61**	**72**	**88**	99	123	129	136	140	152	162	171	174	178	186	186	186			
Top 10 wins	Djokovic	1	3	9	20	35	39	60	84	**108**	**127**	**158**	**179**	**181**	**196**	**205**	**215**	**229**	**240**	**257**	**259**	**263**	(**266**)		
Top 10 wins	Murray	0	4	9	21	35	42	49	61	66	71	83	99	101	101	101	102	104	105	105	105				
Matches played	Federer	35	101	171	251	346	426	511	608	685	766	839	917	**993**	**1076**	**1138**	**1223**	**1297**	**1325**	**1384**	**1444**	**1507**	**1513**	**1526**	**1526**
Matches played	Nadal	**74**	**163**	**234**	**319**	**412**	**492**	**573**	**657**	**705**	**787**	**846**	**927**	980	1060	1109	1174	1208	1237	1284	1288	1307			
Matches played	Djokovic	27	85	172	253	350	429	505	592	675	744	832	906	946	1012	1080	1126	1188	1237	1300	1346	1396	(1415)		
Matches played	Murray	24	89	146	220	297	361	430	502	553	632	717	804	839	851	869	876	905	950	983	1001				
Prize money ($M)	Federer	0.3	0.9	1.7	3.7	7.7	14.1	20.2	28.6	38.7	44.6	53.4	61.0	67.4	76.0	79.2	88.6	97.3	98.8	111.9	120.5	129.2	129.9	130.6	130.6
Prize money ($M)	Nadal	**0.7**	**4.6**	**8.3**	**14.0**	**20.8**	**27.2**	**37.4**	45.1	50.1	64.6	71.4	75.9	78.7	91.4	103.3	119.6	123.5	125.0	134.3	134.7	134.9			
Prize money ($M)	Djokovic	0.2	0.9	4.8	10.5	16.0	20.3	32.9	**45.7**	**58.1**	**72.4**	**94.1**	**107.7**	**109.8**	**125.8**	**139.2**	**145.6**	**154.7**	**164.7**	**180.6**	**185.5**	**191.3**	**(194.8)**		
Prize money ($M)	Murray	0.2	0.9	1.8	5.5	9.9	14.0	19.1	24.9	30.3	34.2	42.4	58.7	60.8	61.0	61.5	61.8	62.3	63.2	64.2	64.7				
Age (end of season)		18	19	20	21	22	23	24	25	26	27	28	29	30	31	32	33	34	35	36	37	38	39	40	41
(Switzerland) Federer's season		1999	2000	2001	2002	2003	2004	2005	2006	2007	2008	2009	2010	2011	2012	2013	2014	2015	2016	2017	2018	2019	2020	2021	2022
(Spain) Nadal's season		2004	2005	2006	2007	2008	2009	2010	2011	2012	2013	2014	2015	2016	2017	2018	2019	2020	2021	2022	2023	2024	2025	2026	2027
(Serbia) Djokovic/ (United Kingdom) Murray's season		2005	2006	2007	2008	2009	2010	2011	2012	2013	2014	2015	2016	2017	2018	2019	2020	2021	2022	2023	2024	2025	2026	2027	2028

=== Titles by events comparison ===
Another way to view their respective careers and evolution is to look at the progression of titles won by the number of events played to win each of their titles at each level of competition including 4 Grand Slam, 9 ATP Masters 1000, ATP Finals (formerly Tennis Masters Cup), and Olympics Games.

Singles title no.		1	2	3	4	5	6	7	8	9	10	11	12	13	14	15	16	17	18	19	20	21	22	23	24	25	26	27	28	29	30	31	32	33	34	35	36	37	38	39	40	SR
Federer	won at Grand Slam no.	17	19	21	22	25	26	27	29	30	31	33	34	38	40	41	43	53	69	70	72																					20/81
Nadal	won at Grand Slam no.	6	9	13	17	18	20	24	25	26	28	32	34	36	38	48	50	52	56	58	60	63	64																			22/68
Djokovic	won at Grand Slam no.	13	25	27	28	29	33	39	41	43	44	45	46	54	55	56	58	60	63	64	65	68	69	70	72																	24/83
Murray	won at Grand Slam no.	28	30	42																																						3/60
Federer	won at ATP Masters 1000 no.	22	35	38	39	41	42	44	45	46	47	50	52	57	59	75	77	84	94	95	97	99	112	113	119	124	125	127	133													28/138
Nadal	won at ATP Masters 1000 no.	10	11	12	14	17	18	22	24	25	33	35	36	40	42	43	51	52	53	59	67	69	70	72	73	74	75	81	95	102	103	109	111	112	116	117	123					36/130
Djokovic	won at ATP Masters 1000 no.	11	15	19	23	36	45	46	47	48	49	53	57	59	63	68	69	70	71	73	77	78	79	80	81	84	85	86	87	89	91	104	105	110	114	115	116	119	122	126	127	40/138
Murray	won at ATP Masters 1000 no.	25	26	29	33	39	41	51	52	63	79	81	89	91	92																											14/119
Federer	won at ATP Finals no.	2	3	5	6	9	10																																			6/17
Nadal	won at ATP Finals no.																																									0/11
Djokovic	won at ATP Finals no.	2	6	7	8	9	15	16																																		7/16
Murray	won at ATP Finals no.	8																																								1/8
Federer	won at Olympic Games no.																																									0/4
Nadal	won at Olympic Games no.	1																																								1/3
Djokovic	won at Olympic Games no.	5																																								1/5
Murray	won at Olympic Games no.	2	3																																							2/3

Current as of 2026 Wimbledon Championships.

== See also ==
- Big Three (tennis)
- List of career achievements by Roger Federer
- List of career achievements by Rafael Nadal
- List of career achievements by Novak Djokovic
- List of career achievements by Andy Murray
- ATP Tour records
- Tennis male players statistics
