= 2011 WTA Premier Mandatory and Premier 5 tournaments =

Women's professional tennis tour

2011 Premier Mandatory / Premier 5
Details
- Duration: February 14 – October 9
- Edition: 22nd
- Tournaments: 9

Achievements (singles)
- Most titles: (Poland) Agnieszka Radwańska (Russia) Maria Sharapova (Denmark) Caroline Wozniacki (2)
- Most finals: (Russia) Maria Sharapova (3)

The WTA Premier Mandatory and Premier 5 tournaments, which are part of the WTA Premier tournaments, make up the elite tour for professional women's tennis organised by the WTA called the WTA Tour. There are four Premier Mandatory tournaments: Indian Wells, Miami, Madrid and Beijing and five Premier 5 tournaments: Dubai, Rome, Canada, Cincinnati and Tokyo.

== Tournaments ==
Tournament	Country	Location	Surface	Date	Prize money
Dubai Duty Free Tennis Championships	United Arab Emirates	Dubai	Hard	Feb 14 – 21	$2,050,000
BNP Paribas Open	United States	Indian Wells	Hard	Mar 7 – 20	$4,500,000
Sony Ericsson Open	United States	Key Biscayne	Hard	Mar 21 – Apr 3	$4,500,000
Mutua Madrileña Madrid Open	Spain	Madrid	Clay (red)	May 2 – 8	$4,500,000
Internazionali BNL d'Italia	Italy	Rome	Clay (red)	May 9 – 15	$2,050,000
Rogers Cup	Canada	Toronto	Hard	Aug 8 – 14	$2,050,000
Western & Southern Open	United States	Mason	Hard	Aug 15 – 21	$2,050,000
Toray Pan Pacific Open	Japan	Tokyo	Hard	Sep 26 – Oct 2	$2,050,000
China Open	China	Beijing	Hard	Oct 3 – 9	$4,500,000

== Results ==
* First-time champion

Tournament	Singles champions	Runners-up	Score	Doubles champions	Runners-up	Score
Dubai Singles – Doubles	(Denmark) Caroline Wozniacki	(Russia) Svetlana Kuznetsova	6–1, 6–3	(United States) Liezel Huber (Spain) María José Martínez Sánchez	(Czech Republic) Květa Peschke (Slovenia) Katarina Srebotnik	7–6^{(7–5)}, 6–3
Indian Wells Singles – Doubles	(Denmark) Caroline Wozniacki (2)	(France) Marion Bartoli	6–1, 2–6, 6–3	(India) Sania Mirza*	(United States) Bethanie Mattek-Sands (United States) Meghann Shaughnessy	6–0, 7–5
Indian Wells Singles – Doubles	(Denmark) Caroline Wozniacki (2)	(France) Marion Bartoli	6–1, 2–6, 6–3	(Russia) Elena Vesnina	(United States) Bethanie Mattek-Sands (United States) Meghann Shaughnessy	6–0, 7–5
Miami Singles – Doubles	(Belarus) Victoria Azarenka	(Russia) Maria Sharapova	6–1, 6–4	(Slovakia) Daniela Hantuchová	(United States) Liezel Huber (Russia) Nadia Petrova	7–6^{(7–5)}, 2–6, [10–8]
Miami Singles – Doubles	(Belarus) Victoria Azarenka	(Russia) Maria Sharapova	6–1, 6–4	(Poland) Agnieszka Radwańska*	(United States) Liezel Huber (Russia) Nadia Petrova	7–6^{(7–5)}, 2–6, [10–8]
Madrid Singles – Doubles	(Czech Republic) Petra Kvitová*	(Belarus) Victoria Azarenka	7–6^{(7–3)}, 6–4	(Belarus) Victoria Azarenka (Russia) Maria Kirilenko	(Czech Republic) Květa Peschke (Slovenia) Katarina Srebotnik	6–4, 6–3
Rome Singles – Doubles	(Russia) Maria Sharapova	(Australia) Samantha Stosur	6–2, 6–4	(China) Peng Shuai (China) Zheng Jie	(United States) Vania King (Kazakhstan) Yaroslava Shvedova	6–2, 6–3
Toronto Singles – Doubles	(United States) Serena Williams	(Australia) Samantha Stosur	6–4, 6–2	(United States) Liezel Huber (2) (United States) Lisa Raymond	(Belarus) Victoria Azarenka (Russia) Maria Kirilenko	Walkover
Cincinnati Singles – Doubles	(Russia) Maria Sharapova (2)	(Serbia) Jelena Janković	4–6, 7–6^{(7–3)}, 6–3	(United States) Vania King	(South Africa) Natalie Grandin (Czech Republic) Vladimíra Uhlířová	6–4, 3–6, [11–9]
Cincinnati Singles – Doubles	(Russia) Maria Sharapova (2)	(Serbia) Jelena Janković	4–6, 7–6^{(7–3)}, 6–3	(Kazakhstan) Yaroslava Shvedova*	(South Africa) Natalie Grandin (Czech Republic) Vladimíra Uhlířová	6–4, 3–6, [11–9]
Tokyo Singles – Doubles	(Poland) Agnieszka Radwańska*	(Russia) Vera Zvonareva	6–3, 6–2	(United States) Liezel Huber (3) (United States) Lisa Raymond (2)	(Argentina) Gisela Dulko (Italy) Flavia Pennetta	7–6^{(7–4)}, 0–6, [10–6]
Beijing Singles – Doubles	(Poland) Agnieszka Radwańska (2)	(Germany) Andrea Petkovic	7–5, 0–6, 6–4	(Czech Republic) Květa Peschke (Slovenia) Katarina Srebotnik	(Argentina) Gisela Dulko (Italy) Flavia Pennetta	6–3, 6–4

== See also ==
- WTA Premier tournaments
- 2011 WTA Tour
- 2011 ATP Masters 1000
- 2011 ATP Tour
