= 2011 ATP World Tour Masters 1000 =

Men's professional tennis tour

2011 ATP Masters 1000
Details
- Duration: March 10 – November 13
- Edition: 22nd
- Tournaments: 9

Achievements (singles)
- Most titles: (Serbia) Novak Djokovic (5)
- Most finals: (Serbia) Novak Djokovic (6)

The twenty-second edition of the ATP Masters Series. The champion of each Masters event is awarded 1,000 rankings points.

== Tournaments ==
Tournament	Country	Location	Court surface	Prize money
Indian Wells Masters	USA	Indian Wells, California	Hard	$4,717,540
Miami Open	USA	Key Biscayne, Florida	Hard	$4,500,000
Monte-Carlo Masters	France	Roquebrune-Cap-Martin	Clay	€2,543,750
Madrid Open	Spain	Madrid	Clay	€3,706,000
Italian Open	Italy	Rome	Clay	€2,750,000
Canadian Open	Canada	Montreal	Hard	$3,000,000
Cincinnati Masters	USA	Mason, Ohio	Hard	$3,200,000
Shanghai Masters	China	Shanghai	Hard	$5,650,000
Paris Masters	France	Paris	Hard (indoor)	€2,750,000

== Results ==
* First-time champion
§ Career Golden Masters

Masters	Singles champions	Runners-up	Score	Doubles champions	Runners-up	Score
Indian Wells Singles – Doubles	(Serbia) Novak Djokovic	(Spain) Rafael Nadal	4–6, 6–3, 6–2	(Ukraine) Alexandr Dolgopolov* (Belgium) Xavier Malisse*	(Switzerland) Roger Federer (Switzerland) Stan Wawrinka	6–4, 6–7^{(5–7)}, [10–7]
Miami Singles – Doubles	(Serbia) Novak Djokovic	(Spain) Rafael Nadal	4–6, 6–3, 7–6^{(7–4)}	(India) Mahesh Bhupathi (India) Leander Paes	(Belarus) Max Mirnyi (Canada) Daniel Nestor	6–7^{(5–7)}, 6–2, [10–5]
Monte Carlo Singles – Doubles	(Spain) Rafael Nadal	(Spain) David Ferrer	6–4, 7–5	(United States) Bob Bryan (United States) Mike Bryan	(Argentina) Juan Ignacio Chela (Brazil) Bruno Soares	6–3, 6–2
Madrid Singles – Doubles	(Serbia) Novak Djokovic	(Spain) Rafael Nadal	7–5, 6–4	(United States) Bob Bryan (United States) Mike Bryan	(France) Michaël Llodra (Serbia) Nenad Zimonjić	6–3, 6–3
Rome Singles – Doubles	(Serbia) Novak Djokovic	(Spain) Rafael Nadal	6–4, 6–4	(United States) John Isner* (United States) Sam Querrey*	(United States) Mardy Fish (United States) Andy Roddick	W/O
Montreal Singles – Doubles	(Serbia) Novak Djokovic	(United States) Mardy Fish	6–2, 3–6, 6–4	(France) Michaël Llodra (Serbia) Nenad Zimonjić	(United States) Bob Bryan (United States) Mike Bryan	6–4, 6–7^{(5–7)}, [10–5]
Cincinnati Singles – Doubles	(United Kingdom) Andy Murray	(Serbia) Novak Djokovic	6–4, 3–0 ret.	(India) Mahesh Bhupathi (India) Leander Paes	(France) Michaël Llodra (Serbia) Nenad Zimonjić	7–6^{(7–4)}, 7–6^{(7–2)}
Shanghai Singles – Doubles	(United Kingdom) Andy Murray	(Spain) David Ferrer	7–5, 6–4	(Belarus) Max Mirnyi	(France) Michaël Llodra (Serbia) Nenad Zimonjić	3–6, 6–1, [12–10]
Shanghai Singles – Doubles	(United Kingdom) Andy Murray	(Spain) David Ferrer	7–5, 6–4	(Canada) Daniel Nestor^{§}	(France) Michaël Llodra (Serbia) Nenad Zimonjić	3–6, 6–1, [12–10]
Paris Singles – Doubles	(Switzerland) Roger Federer	(France) Jo-Wilfried Tsonga	6–1, 7–6^{(7–3)}	(India) Rohan Bopanna* (Pakistan) Aisam-ul-Haq Qureshi*	(France) Julien Benneteau (France) Nicolas Mahut	6–2, 6–4

== Tournament details ==
Key

- Q = Qualifier
- WC = Wild card
- LL = Lucky loser
- Alt = Alternate
- ITF = ITF entry
- PR = Protected ranking
- SR = Special ranking
- SE = Special exempt
- JE = Junior exempt
- JR = Junior Accelerator Programme entrant
- CO = College Accelerator Programme entrant
- NG = Next Gen Accelerator Program entrant
- w/o = Walkover
- r = Retired
- d = Defaulted

=== Indian Wells Masters ===
==== Singles ====
Quarterfinals
1	(Spain) Rafael Nadal	5	6	7
PR	(Croatia) Ivo Karlović	7	1	6^{7}
PR	(Argentina) Juan Martín del Potro	w/o
25	(Spain) Tommy Robredo
18	(France) Richard Gasquet	2	4
3	(Serbia) Novak Djokovic	6	6
12	(Switzerland) Stanislas Wawrinka	3	4
2	(Switzerland) Roger Federer	6	6

Semifinals
1	(Spain) Rafael Nadal	6	6
PR	(Argentina) Juan Martín del Potro	4	4
3	(Serbia) Novak Djokovic	6	3	6
2	(Switzerland) Roger Federer	3	6	2

Final
1	(Spain) Rafael Nadal	6	3	2
3	(Serbia) Novak Djokovic	4	6	6

==== Doubles ====
Semifinals
(Ukraine) Alexandr Dolgopolov (Belgium) Xavier Malisse	3	6	[10]
(India) Rohan Bopanna (Pakistan) Aisam-ul-Haq Qureshi	6	3	[8]
(Spain) Marc López (Spain) Rafael Nadal	5	3
(Switzerland) Roger Federer (Switzerland) Stanislas Wawrinka	7	6

Final
(Ukraine) Alexandr Dolgopolov (Belgium) Xavier Malisse	6	6^{5}	[10]
(Switzerland) Roger Federer (Switzerland) Stanislas Wawrinka	4	7	[7]

=== Miami Open ===
==== Singles ====
Quarterfinals
1	(Spain) Rafael Nadal	6	3	6
7	(Czech Republic) Tomáš Berdych	2	6	3
3	(Switzerland) Roger Federer	3
25	(France) Gilles Simon	0^{r}
6	(Spain) David Ferrer	5	2
14	(United States) Mardy Fish	7	6
(South Africa) Kevin Anderson	4	2
2	(Serbia) Novak Djokovic	6	6

Semifinals
1	(Spain) Rafael Nadal	6	6
3	(Switzerland) Roger Federer	3	2
14	(United States) Mardy Fish	3	1
2	(Serbia) Novak Djokovic	6	6

Final
1	(Spain) Rafael Nadal	6	3	6^{4}
2	(Serbia) Novak Djokovic	4	6	7^{7}

==== Doubles ====
Semifinals
(Ukraine) Alexandr Dolgopolov (Belgium) Xavier Malisse	3	6	[10]
(India) Rohan Bopanna (Pakistan) Aisam-ul-Haq Qureshi	6	3	[8]
(Spain) Marc López (Spain) Rafael Nadal	5	3
(Switzerland) Roger Federer (Switzerland) Stanislas Wawrinka	7	6

Final
(Ukraine) Alexandr Dolgopolov (Belgium) Xavier Malisse	6	6^{5}	[10]
(Switzerland) Roger Federer (Switzerland) Stanislas Wawrinka	4	7	[7]

=== Monte-Carlo Masters ===
==== Singles ====
Quarterfinals
1	(Spain) Rafael Nadal	6	6
(Croatia) Ivan Ljubičić	1	3
3/WC	(United Kingdom) Andy Murray	6	6
Q	(Portugal) Frederico Gil	2	1
11	(Serbia) Viktor Troicki	3	3
4	(Spain) David Ferrer	6	6
7	(Austria) Jürgen Melzer	6	6
2	(Switzerland) Roger Federer	4	4

Semifinals
1	(Spain) Rafael Nadal	6	2	6
3/WC	(United Kingdom) Andy Murray	4	6	1
4	(Spain) David Ferrer	6	6
7	(Austria) Jürgen Melzer	3	2

Final
1	(Spain) Rafael Nadal	6	7
4	(Spain) David Ferrer	4	5

==== Doubles ====
Semifinals
1	(United States) Bob Bryan (United States) Mike Bryan	6	6
5	(Poland) Mariusz Fyrstenberg (Poland) Marcin Matkowski	3	4
(Argentina) Juan Ignacio Chela (Brazil) Bruno Soares	6	6^{3}	[10]
6	(India) Rohan Bopanna (Pakistan) Aisam-ul-Haq Qureshi	2	7	[7]

Final
1	(United States) Bob Bryan (United States) Mike Bryan	6	6
(Argentina) Juan Ignacio Chela (Brazil) Bruno Soares	3	2

=== Madrid Open ===
==== Singles ====
Quarterfinals
1	(Spain) Rafael Nadal	6	6
(France) Michaël Llodra	2	2
3	(Switzerland) Roger Federer	7^{7}	6
5	(Sweden) Robin Söderling	6^{2}	4
7	(Czech Republic) Tomáš Berdych	6^{2}	3
(Brazil) Thomaz Bellucci	7^{7}	6
6	(Spain) David Ferrer	4	6	3
2	(Serbia) Novak Djokovic	6	4	6

Semifinals
1	(Spain) Rafael Nadal	5	6	6
3	(Switzerland) Roger Federer	7	1	3
(Brazil) Thomaz Bellucci	6	4	1
2	(Serbia) Novak Djokovic	4	6	6

Final
1	(Spain) Rafael Nadal	5	4
2	(Serbia) Novak Djokovic	7	6

==== Doubles ====
Semifinals
1	(United States) Bob Bryan (United States) Mike Bryan	4	6	[12]
(United States) John Isner (United States) Sam Querrey	6	1	[10]
Alt	(Croatia) Marin Čilić (Croatia) Ivan Ljubičić	6	1	[10]
6	(France) Michaël Llodra (Serbia) Nenad Zimonjić	4	6	[12]

Final
1	(United States) Bob Bryan (United States) Mike Bryan	6	6
6	(France) Michaël Llodra (Serbia) Nenad Zimonjić	3	3

=== Italian Open ===
==== Singles ====
Quarterfinals
1	(Spain) Rafael Nadal	6	6
(Croatia) Marin Čilić	1	3
16	(France) Richard Gasquet	4	6	6
7	(Czech Republic) Tomáš Berdych	6	2	4
(Germany) Florian Mayer	6	1	1
4	(United Kingdom) Andy Murray	1	6	6
5	(Sweden) Robin Söderling	3	0
2	(Serbia) Novak Djokovic	6	6

Semifinals
1	(Spain) Rafael Nadal	7	6
16	(France) Richard Gasquet	5	1
4	(United Kingdom) Andy Murray	1	6	6^{2}
2	(Serbia) Novak Djokovic	6	3	7^{7}

Final
1	(Spain) Rafael Nadal	4	4
2	(Serbia) Novak Djokovic	6	6

==== Doubles ====
Semifinals
(United States) Mardy Fish (United States) Andy Roddick	7	6
Alt	(Argentina) Carlos Berlocq (Finland) Jarkko Nieminen	6^{7}	2
(United States) John Isner (United States) Sam Querrey	6	6
WC	(Italy) Simone Bolelli (Italy) Fabio Fognini	4	3

Final
(United States) Mardy Fish (United States) Andy Roddick
(United States) John Isner (United States) Sam Querrey	w/o

=== Canadian Open ===
==== Singles ====
Quarterfinals
1	(Serbia) Novak Djokovic	6	6
5	(France) Gaël Monfils	2	1
13	(France) Jo-Wilfried Tsonga	6	6
8	(Spain) Nicolás Almagro	4	4
6	(United States) Mardy Fish	6	6^{8}	6
14	(Switzerland) Stanislas Wawrinka	3	7^{10}	0
7	(Czech Republic) Tomáš Berdych	4	4
(Serbia) Janko Tipsarević	6	6

Semifinals
1	(Serbia) Novak Djokovic	6	3
13	(France) Jo-Wilfried Tsonga	4	0^{r}
6	(United States) Mardy Fish	6	6
(Serbia) Janko Tipsarević	3	4

Final
1	(Serbia) Novak Djokovic	6	3	6
6	(United States) Mardy Fish	2	6	4

==== Doubles ====
Semifinals
1	(United States) Bob Bryan (United States) Mike Bryan	6	6
(Czech Republic) Tomáš Berdych (Germany) Florian Mayer	2	1
4	(France) Michaël Llodra (Serbia) Nenad Zimonjić	6	6
2	(Belarus) Max Mirnyi (Canada) Daniel Nestor	3	4

Final
1	(United States) Bob Bryan (United States) Mike Bryan	4	7^{7}	[5]
4	(France) Michaël Llodra (Serbia) Nenad Zimonjić	6	6^{5}	[10]

=== Cincinnati Masters ===
==== Singles ====
Quarterfinals
1	(Serbia) Novak Djokovic	3	6	6
6	(France) Gaël Monfils	6	4	3
3	(Switzerland) Roger Federer	2	6^{3}
8	(Czech Republic) Tomáš Berdych	6	7^{7}
10	(France) Gilles Simon	3	3
4	(United Kingdom) Andy Murray	6	6
7	(United States) Mardy Fish	6	6
2	(Spain) Rafael Nadal	3	4

Semifinals
1	(Serbia) Novak Djokovic	7	0
8	(Czech Republic) Tomáš Berdych	5	0^{r}
4	(United Kingdom) Andy Murray	6	7^{10}
7	(United States) Mardy Fish	3	6^{8}

Final
1	(Serbia) Novak Djokovic	4	0^{r}
4	(United Kingdom) Andy Murray	6	3

==== Doubles ====
Semifinals
1	(United States) Bob Bryan (United States) Mike Bryan	6	6^{2}	[7]
3	(India) Mahesh Bhupathi (India) Leander Paes	1	7^{7}	[10]
4	(France) Michaël Llodra (Serbia) Nenad Zimonjić	4	6	[10]
(Colombia) Juan Sebastián Cabal (Germany) Florian Mayer	6	3	[4]

Final
3	(India) Mahesh Bhupathi (India) Leander Paes	7^{7}	7^{7}
4	(France) Michaël Llodra (Serbia) Nenad Zimonjić	6^{4}	6^{2}

=== Shanghai Masters ===
==== Singles ====
Quarterfinals
15	(Germany) Florian Mayer	2	4
(Spain) Feliciano López	6	6
3	(Spain) David Ferrer	6^{5}	6	7^{7}
10	(United States) Andy Roddick	7^{7}	2	6^{2}
12	(Ukraine) Alexandr Dolgopolov	4	3
(Japan) Kei Nishikori	6	6
Q	(Australia) Matthew Ebden	3	2
2	(United Kingdom) Andy Murray	6	6

Semifinals
(Spain) Feliciano López	7^{7}	3	3
3	(Spain) David Ferrer	6^{5}	6	6
(Japan) Kei Nishikori	3	0
2	(United Kingdom) Andy Murray	6	6

Final
3	(Spain) David Ferrer	5	4
2	(United Kingdom) Andy Murray	7	6

==== Doubles ====
Semifinals
6	(Poland) Mariusz Fyrstenberg (Poland) Marcin Matkowski	2	6^{5}
3	(France) Michaël Llodra (Serbia) Nenad Zimonjić	6	7^{7}
4	(India) Mahesh Bhupathi (India) Leander Paes	1	4
2	(Belarus) Max Mirnyi (Canada) Daniel Nestor	6	6

Final
3	(France) Michaël Llodra (Serbia) Nenad Zimonjić	6	1	[10]
2	(Belarus) Max Mirnyi (Canada) Daniel Nestor	3	6	[12]

=== Paris Masters ===
==== Singles ====
Quarterfinals
1	(Serbia) Novak Djokovic
6	(France) Jo-Wilfried Tsonga	^{w/o}
4	(Spain) David Ferrer	3	6	3
(United States) John Isner	6	3	6
(Argentina) Juan Mónaco	3	5
3	(Switzerland) Roger Federer	6	7
5	(Czech Republic) Tomáš Berdych	4	7^{7}	6
2	(United Kingdom) Andy Murray	6	6^{5}	4

Semifinals
6	(France) Jo-Wilfried Tsonga	3	7^{7}	7^{7}
(United States) John Isner	6	6^{1}	6^{3}
3	(Switzerland) Roger Federer	6	6
5	(Czech Republic) Tomáš Berdych	4	3

Final
6	(France) Jo-Wilfried Tsonga	1	6^{3}
3	(Switzerland) Roger Federer	6	7^{7}

==== Doubles ====
Semifinals
WC	(France) Julien Benneteau (France) Nicolas Mahut	6	7^{7}
(Mexico) Santiago González (Germany) Christopher Kas	1	6^{3}
3	(Belarus) Max Mirnyi (Canada) Daniel Nestor	3	6^{7}
7	(India) Rohan Bopanna (Pakistan) Aisam-ul-Haq Qureshi	6	7^{9}

Final
WC	(France) Julien Benneteau (France) Nicolas Mahut	2	4
7	(India) Rohan Bopanna (Pakistan) Aisam-ul-Haq Qureshi	6	6

== See also ==
- ATP Tour Masters 1000
- 2011 ATP Tour
- 2011 WTA Premier Mandatory and Premier 5 tournaments
- 2011 WTA Tour
