= 2011 Western & Southern Open – Men's doubles =

Men's doubles
- 2011 Western & Southern Open

Final
- Champions: (India) Mahesh Bhupathi (India) Leander Paes
- Runners-up: (France) Michaël Llodra (Serbia) Nenad Zimonjić
- Score: 7–6^{(7–4)}, 7–6^{(7–2)}

Events
Singles	men	women
Doubles	men	women
- Western & Southern Open

Bob and Mike Bryan were the defending champions, but lost to Mahesh Bhupathi and Leander Paes in the semifinals 6–1, 6–7^{(2–7)}, 7–10.

Bhupathi and Paes won the title, defeating Michaël Llodra and Nenad Zimonjić 7–6^{(7–4)}, 7–6^{(7–2)} in the final.

== Seeds ==
1. (United States) Bob Bryan / (United States) Mike Bryan (semifinals)
2. (Belarus) Max Mirnyi / (Canada) Daniel Nestor (second round)
3. (India) Mahesh Bhupathi / (India) Leander Paes (champions)
4. (France) Michaël Llodra / (Serbia) Nenad Zimonjić (final)
5. (India) Rohan Bopanna / (Pakistan) Aisam-ul-Haq Qureshi (quarterfinals)
6. (Sweden) Robert Lindstedt / (Romania) Horia Tecău (second round)
7. (Poland) Mariusz Fyrstenberg / (Poland) Marcin Matkowski (quarterfinals)
8. (Austria) Jürgen Melzer / (Germany) Philipp Petzschner (second round)

== Draw ==
Key

- Q = Qualifier
- WC = Wild card
- LL = Lucky loser
- Alt = Alternate
- ITF = ITF entry
- PR = Protected ranking
- SR = Special ranking
- SE = Special exempt
- JE = Junior exempt
- JR = Junior Accelerator Programme entrant
- CO = College Accelerator Programme entrant
- NG = Next Gen Accelerator Program entrant
- w/o = Walkover
- r = Retired
- d = Defaulted

=== Finals ===
Semifinals
1	(United States) Bob Bryan (United States) Mike Bryan	6	6^{2}	[7]
3	(India) Mahesh Bhupathi (India) Leander Paes	1	7^{7}	[10]
4	(France) Michaël Llodra (Serbia) Nenad Zimonjić	4	6	[10]
(Colombia) Juan Sebastián Cabal (Germany) Florian Mayer	6	3	[4]

Final
3	(India) Mahesh Bhupathi (India) Leander Paes	7^{7}	7^{7}
4	(France) Michaël Llodra (Serbia) Nenad Zimonjić	6^{4}	6^{2}

=== Top half ===
First round
(Spain) F López (Spain) F Verdasco	6^{4}	3
Alt	(Czech Republic) L Dlouhý (Ukraine) A Dolgopolov	7^{7}	6
(United States) S Lipsky (Brazil) B Soares	6	7
(The Bahamas) M Knowles (Belgium) X Malisse	4	5
(Serbia) J Tipsarević (Serbia) V Troicki	6^{4}	7^{7}	[5]
(Spain) M López (Spain) R Nadal	7^{7}	6^{2}	[10]
(Czech Republic) T Berdych (Czech Republic) R Štěpánek	6	6
(Spain) N Almagro (Spain) P Andújar	2	3

Second round
1	(United States) B Bryan (United States) M Bryan	6	4	[10]
Alt	(Czech Republic) L Dlouhý (Ukraine) A Dolgopolov	2	6	[1]
(United States) S Lipsky (Brazil) B Soares	3	6^{5}
7	(Poland) M Fyrstenberg (Poland) M Matkowski	6	7^{7}
3	(India) M Bhupathi (India) L Paes	6	6
(Spain) M López (Spain) R Nadal	4	2
(Czech Republic) T Berdych (Czech Republic) R Štěpánek	6	6^{3}	[10]
6	(Sweden) R Lindstedt (Romania) H Tecău	2	7^{7}	[6]

Quarterfinals
1	(United States) B Bryan (United States) M Bryan	7^{7}	7^{7}
7	(Poland) M Fyrstenberg (Poland) M Matkowski	6^{5}	6^{3}
3	(India) M Bhupathi (India) L Paes	w/o
(Czech Republic) T Berdych (Czech Republic) R Štěpánek

Semifinals
1	(United States) B Bryan (United States) M Bryan	6	6^{2}	[7]
3	(India) M Bhupathi (India) L Paes	1	7^{7}	[10]

=== Bottom half ===
First round
(Argentina) JI Chela (Argentina) J Mónaco	6	3	[10]
(Austria) O Marach (Belgium) D Norman	4	6	[6]
(France) G Monfils (France) G Simon	1	1
(United States) E Butorac (Curaçao) J-J Rojer	6	6
(Ukraine) S Stakhovsky (Russia) M Youzhny	5	6^{7}
(Colombia) JS Cabal (Germany) F Mayer	7	7^{9}
WC	(United States) J Blake (United States) J Isner	6	4	[7]
WC	(United States) A Bogomolov Jr. (United States) S Johnson	2	6	[10]

Second round
5	(India) R Bopanna (Pakistan) A-u-H Qureshi	6	5	[10]
(Argentina) JI Chela (Argentina) J Mónaco	3	7	[4]
(United States) E Butorac (Curaçao) J-J Rojer	7	4	[5]
4	(France) M Llodra (Serbia) N Zimonjić	5	6	[10]
8	(Austria) J Melzer (Germany) P Petzschner	5	6^{5}
(Colombia) JS Cabal (Germany) F Mayer	7	7^{7}
WC	(United States) A Bogomolov Jr. (United States) S Johnson	7	6^{6}	[10]
2	(Belarus) M Mirnyi (Canada) D Nestor	5	7^{8}	[7]

Quarterfinals
5	(India) R Bopanna (Pakistan) A-u-H Qureshi	3	2
4	(France) M Llodra (Serbia) N Zimonjić	6	6
(Colombia) JS Cabal (Germany) F Mayer	1	7	[10]
WC	(United States) A Bogomolov Jr. (United States) S Johnson	6	5	[7]

Semifinals
4	(France) M Llodra (Serbia) N Zimonjić	4	6	[10]
(Colombia) JS Cabal (Germany) F Mayer	6	3	[4]
