= 2013 ATP World Tour Masters 1000 =

Men's professional tennis tour

2013 ATP Masters 1000
Details
- Duration: March 7 – November 3
- Edition: 24th
- Tournaments: 9

Achievements (singles)
- Most titles: (Spain) Rafael Nadal (5)
- Most finals: (Spain) Rafael Nadal (6)

The twenty-fourth edition of the ATP Masters Series. The champion of each Masters event is awarded 1,000 rankings points.

== Tournaments ==
Tournament	Country	Location	Court surface	Prize money
Indian Wells Masters	USA	Indian Wells, California	Hard	$6,676,605
Miami Open	USA	Key Biscayne, Florida	Hard	$5,244,125
Monte-Carlo Masters	France	Roquebrune-Cap-Martin	Clay	€2,998,495
Madrid Open	Spain	Madrid	Clay	€4,303,867
Italian Open	Italy	Rome	Clay	€3,204,745
Canadian Open	Canada	Montreal	Hard	$3,496,085
Cincinnati Masters	USA	Mason, Ohio	Hard	$3,729,155
Shanghai Masters	China	Shanghai	Hard	$6,211,445
Paris Masters	France	Paris	Hard (indoor)	€3,204,745

== Results ==
* First-time champion

Masters	Singles champions	Runners-up	Score	Doubles champions	Runners-up	Score
Indian Wells Singles – Doubles	(Spain) Rafael Nadal	(Argentina) Juan Martín del Potro	4–6, 6–3, 6–4	(United States) Bob Bryan (United States) Mike Bryan	(Philippines) Treat Huey (Poland) Jerzy Janowicz	6–3, 3–6, [10–6]
Miami Singles – Doubles	(United Kingdom) Andy Murray	(Spain) David Ferrer	2–6, 6–4, 7–6^{(7–1)}	(Pakistan) Aisam-ul-Haq Qureshi	(Poland) Mariusz Fyrstenberg (Poland) Marcin Matkowski	6–4, 6–1
Miami Singles – Doubles	(United Kingdom) Andy Murray	(Spain) David Ferrer	2–6, 6–4, 7–6^{(7–1)}	(Netherlands) Jean-Julien Rojer*	(Poland) Mariusz Fyrstenberg (Poland) Marcin Matkowski	6–4, 6–1
Monte Carlo Singles – Doubles	(Serbia) Novak Djokovic	(Spain) Rafael Nadal	6–2, 7–6^{(7–1)}	(France) Julien Benneteau (Serbia) Nenad Zimonjić	(United States) Bob Bryan (United States) Mike Bryan	4–6, 7–6^{(7–4)}, [14–12]
Madrid Singles – Doubles	(Spain) Rafael Nadal	(Switzerland) Stan Wawrinka	6–2, 6–4	(United States) Bob Bryan (United States) Mike Bryan	(Austria) Alexander Peya (Brazil) Bruno Soares	6–2, 6–3
Rome Singles – Doubles	(Spain) Rafael Nadal	(Switzerland) Roger Federer	6–1, 6–3	(United States) Bob Bryan (United States) Mike Bryan	(India) Mahesh Bhupathi (India) Rohan Bopanna	6–2, 6–3
Montreal Singles – Doubles	(Spain) Rafael Nadal	(Canada) Milos Raonic	6–2, 6–2	(Austria) Alexander Peya* (Brazil) Bruno Soares*	(United Kingdom) Colin Fleming (United Kingdom) Andy Murray	6–4, 7–6^{(7–4)}
Cincinnati Singles – Doubles	(Spain) Rafael Nadal	(United States) John Isner	7–6^{(10–8)}, 7–6^{(7–3)}	(United States) Bob Bryan (United States) Mike Bryan	(Spain) Marcel Granollers (Spain) Marc López	6–4, 4–6, [10–4]
Shanghai Singles – Doubles	(Serbia) Novak Djokovic	(Argentina) Juan Martín del Potro	6–1, 3–6, 7–6^{(7–3)}	(Croatia) Ivan Dodig* (Brazil) Marcelo Melo*	(Spain) David Marrero (Spain) Fernando Verdasco	7–6^{(7–2)}, 6–7^{(6–8)}, [10–2]
Paris Singles – Doubles	(Serbia) Novak Djokovic	(Spain) David Ferrer	7–5, 7–5	(United States) Bob Bryan (United States) Mike Bryan	(Austria) Alexander Peya (Brazil) Bruno Soares	6–3, 6–3

== Tournament details ==
Key

- Q = Qualifier
- WC = Wild card
- LL = Lucky loser
- Alt = Alternate
- ITF = ITF entry
- PR = Protected ranking
- SR = Special ranking
- SE = Special exempt
- JE = Junior exempt
- JR = Junior Accelerator Programme entrant
- CO = College Accelerator Programme entrant
- NG = Next Gen Accelerator Program entrant
- w/o = Walkover
- r = Retired
- d = Defaulted

=== Indian Wells Masters ===
==== Singles ====
Quarterfinals
1	(Serbia) Novak Djokovic	6	7^{8}
8	(France) Jo-Wilfried Tsonga	0	6^{6}
3	(United Kingdom) Andy Murray	7^{7}	3	1
7	(Argentina) Juan Martín del Potro	6^{5}	6	6
6	(Czech Republic) Tomas Berdych	6	6
(South Africa) Kevin Anderson	4	4
5	(Spain) Rafael Nadal	6	6
2	(Switzerland) Roger Federer	4	2

Semifinals
1	(Serbia) Novak Djokovic	6	4	4
7	(Argentina) Juan Martín del Potro	4	6	6
6	(Czech Republic) Tomas Berdych	4	5
5	(Spain) Rafael Nadal	6	7

Final
7	(Argentina) Juan Martín del Potro	6	3	4
5	(Spain) Rafael Nadal	4	6	6

==== Doubles ====
Semifinals
1	(United States) Bob Bryan (United States) Mike Bryan	6	4	[11]
(Mexico) Santiago González (United States) Scott Lipsky	4	6	[9]
(Philippines) Treat Conrad Huey (Poland) Jerzy Janowicz	7	1	[12]
(Austria) Alexander Peya (Brazil) Bruno Soares	5	6	[10]

Final
1	(United States) Bob Bryan (United States) Mike Bryan	6	3	[10]
(Philippines) Treat Conrad Huey (Poland) Jerzy Janowicz	3	6	[6]

=== Miami Open ===
==== Singles ====
Quarterfinals
15	(Germany) Tommy Haas	6	6
11	(France) Gilles Simon	3	1
3	(Spain) David Ferrer	4	6	6
(Austria) Jürgen Melzer	6	3	0
8	(France) Richard Gasquet	6	6
4	(Czech Republic) Tomas Berdych	3	3
9	(Croatia) Marin Čilić	4	3
2	(United Kingdom) Andy Murray	6	6

Semifinals
15	(Germany) Tommy Haas	6	2	3
3	(Spain) David Ferrer	4	6	6
8	(France) Richard Gasquet	7^{7}	1	2
2	(United Kingdom) Andy Murray	6^{3}	6	6

Final
3	(Spain) David Ferrer	6	4	6^{1}
2	(United Kingdom) Andy Murray	2	6	7^{7}

==== Doubles ====
Semifinals
(Bulgaria) Grigor Dimitrov (Denmark) Frederik Nielsen	4	2
8	(Poland) Mariusz Fyrstenberg (Poland) Marcin Matkowski	6	6
5	(Pakistan) Aisam-ul-Haq Qureshi (Netherlands) Jean-Julien Rojer	6	6
2	(Spain) Marcel Granollers (Spain) Marc López	3	2

Final
8	(Poland) Mariusz Fyrstenberg (Poland) Marcin Matkowski	4	1
5	(Pakistan) Aisam-ul-Haq Qureshi (Netherlands) Jean-Julien Rojer	6	6

=== Monte-Carlo Masters ===
==== Singles ====
Quarterfinales
1	(Serbia) Novak Djokovic	6	6
(Finland) Jarkko Nieminen	4	3
(Italy) Fabio Fognini	7^{7}	6
7	(France) Richard Gasquet	6^{0}	2
(Bulgaria) Grigor Dimitrov	2	6	4
3	(Spain) Rafael Nadal	6	2	6
6	(France) Jo-Wilfried Tsonga	2	6	6
13	(Switzerland) Stanislas Wawrinka	6	3	4

Semifinales
1	(Serbia) Novak Djokovic	6	6
(Italy) Fabio Fognini	2	1
3	(Spain) Rafael Nadal	6	7^{7}
6	(France) Jo-Wilfried Tsonga	3	6^{3}

Finale
1	(Serbia) Novak Djokovic	6	7^{7}
3	(Spain) Rafael Nadal	2	6^{1}

==== Doubles ====
Semifinals
1	(United States) Bob Bryan (United States) Mike Bryan	6	6
(Canada) Milos Raonic (Australia) Bernard Tomic	3	3
(France) Julien Benneteau (Serbia) Nenad Zimonjić	6	6
(Spain) David Marrero (Spain) Fernando Verdasco	4	3

Final
(United States) Bob Bryan (United States) Mike Bryan	6	6^{4}	[12]
(France) Julien Benneteau (Serbia) Nenad Zimonjić	4	7^{7}	[14]

=== Madrid Open ===
==== Singles ====
Quarterfinals
15	(Switzerland) Stanislas Wawrinka	6	6^{9}	6
7	(France) Jo-Wilfried Tsonga	2	7^{11}	4
3	(United Kingdom) Andy Murray	6^{3}	4
6	(Czech Republic) Tomáš Berdych	7^{7}	6
5	(Spain) Rafael Nadal	4	7^{7}	6
4	(Spain) David Ferrer	6	6^{3}	0
WC	(Spain) Pablo Andújar	6	7
14	(Japan) Kei Nishikori	3	5

Semifinals
15	(Switzerland) Stanislas Wawrinka	6	4	6
6	(Czech Republic) Tomáš Berdych	3	6	4
5	(Spain) Rafael Nadal	6	6
WC	(Spain) Pablo Andújar	0	4

Final
15	(Switzerland) Stanislas Wawrinka	2	4
5	(Spain) Rafael Nadal	6	6

==== Doubles ====
Semifinals
1	(United States) Bob Bryan (United States) Mike Bryan	6	6^{1}	[10]
(France) Jérémy Chardy (Poland) Łukasz Kubot	3	7^{7}	[4]
7	(Austria) Alexander Peya (Brazil) Bruno Soares	7	7
(Spain) David Marrero (Spain) Fernando Verdasco	5	5

Final
1	(United States) Bob Bryan (United States) Mike Bryan	6	6
7	(Austria) Alexander Peya (Brazil) Bruno Soares	2	3

=== Italian Open ===
==== Singles ====
Quarterfinals
1	(Serbia) Novak Djokovic	6	5	4
6	(Czech Republic) Tomáš Berdych	2	7	6
4	(Spain) David Ferrer	4	6	2
5	(Spain) Rafael Nadal	6	4	6
(France) Benoît Paire	6	6
(Spain) Marcel Granollers	1	0
(Poland) Jerzy Janowicz	4	6^{2}
2	(Switzerland) Roger Federer	6	7^{7}

Semifinals
6	(Czech Republic) Tomáš Berdych	2	4
5	(Spain) Rafael Nadal	6	6
(France) Benoît Paire	6^{5}	4
2	(Switzerland) Roger Federer	7^{7}	6

Final
5	(Spain) Rafael Nadal	6	6
2	(Switzerland) Roger Federer	1	3

==== Doubles ====
Semifinals
1	(United States) Bob Bryan (United States) Mike Bryan	6	6^{2}	[10]
5	(Belarus) Max Mirnyi (Romania) Horia Tecău	4	7^{7}	[3]
6	(India) Mahesh Bhupathi (India) Rohan Bopanna	6	7^{7}
(Mexico) Santiago González (United States) Scott Lipsky	3	6^{3}

Final
1	(United States) Bob Bryan (United States) Mike Bryan	6	6
6	(India) Mahesh Bhupathi (India) Rohan Bopanna	2	3

=== Canadian Open ===
==== Singles ====
Quarterfinals
1	(Serbia) Novak Djokovic	6	6
7	(France) Richard Gasquet	1	2
4	(Spain) Rafael Nadal	6	6
Q	(Australia) Marinko Matosevic	2	4
WC	(Canada) Vasek Pospisil	3
(Russia) Nikolay Davydenko	0^{r}
11	(Canada) Milos Raonic	7^{7}	4	6
(Latvia) Ernests Gulbis	6^{3}	6	4

Semifinals
1	(Serbia) Novak Djokovic	4	6	6^{2}
4	(Spain) Rafael Nadal	6	3	7^{7}
WC	(Canada) Vasek Pospisil	4	6	6^{4}
11	(Canada) Milos Raonic	6	1	7^{7}

Final
4	(Spain) Rafael Nadal	6	6
11	(Canada) Milos Raonic	2	2

==== Doubles ====
Semifinals
6	(Sweden) Robert Lindstedt (Canada) Daniel Nestor	3	0
(United Kingdom) Colin Fleming (United Kingdom) Andy Murray	6	6
3	(Austria) Alexander Peya (Brazil) Bruno Soares	6	7^{7}
(Poland) Mariusz Fyrstenberg (Poland) Marcin Matkowski	2	6^{3}

Final
(United Kingdom) Colin Fleming (United Kingdom) Andy Murray	4	6^{4}
3	(Austria) Alexander Peya (Brazil) Bruno Soares	6	7^{7}

=== Cincinnati Masters ===
==== Singles ====
Quarterfinals
1	(Serbia) Novak Djokovic	6^{5}	6	5
(United States) John Isner	7^{7}	3	7
Q	(Russia) Dmitry Tursunov	4	6	1
7	(Argentina) Juan Martín del Potro	6	3	6
5	(Switzerland) Roger Federer	7	4	3
4	(Spain) Rafael Nadal	5	6	6
6	(Czech Republic) Tomáš Berdych	6	6
2	(United Kingdom) Andy Murray	3	4

Semifinals
(United States) John Isner	6^{5}	7^{11}	6
7	(Argentina) Juan Martín del Potro	7^{7}	6^{9}	3
4	(Spain) Rafael Nadal	7	7^{7}
6	(Czech Republic) Tomáš Berdych	5	6^{4}

Final
(United States) John Isner	6^{8}	6^{3}
4	(Spain) Rafael Nadal	7^{10}	7^{7}

==== Doubles ====
Semifinals
1	(United States) Bob Bryan (United States) Mike Bryan	4	7^{8}	[10]
(Mexico) Santiago González (United States) Scott Lipsky	6	6^{6}	[6]
8	(India) Rohan Bopanna (France) Édouard Roger-Vasselin	5	2
2	(Spain) Marcel Granollers (Spain) Marc López	7	6

Final
1	(United States) Bob Bryan (United States) Mike Bryan	6	4	[10]
2	(Spain) Marcel Granollers (Spain) Marc López	4	6	[4]

=== Shanghai Masters ===
==== Singles ====
Quarterfinals
1	(Serbia) Novak Djokovic	6^{4}	6	6
(France) Gaël Monfils	7^{7}	2	4
(Germany) Florian Mayer	2	3
7	(France) Jo-Wilfried Tsonga	6	6
6	(Argentina) Juan Martín del Potro	6	6
15	(Spain) Nicolás Almagro	3	3
8	(Switzerland) Stanislas Wawrinka	6^{10}	1
2	(Spain) Rafael Nadal	7^{12}	6

Semifinals
1	(Serbia) Novak Djokovic	6	7
7	(France) Jo-Wilfried Tsonga	2	5
6	(Argentina) Juan Martín del Potro	6	6
2	(Spain) Rafael Nadal	2	4

Final
1	(Serbia) Novak Djokovic	6	3	7^{7}
6	(Argentina) Juan Martín del Potro	1	6	6^{3}

==== Doubles ====
Semifinals
1	(United States) Bob Bryan (United States) Mike Bryan	7^{7}	5	[7]
5	(Croatia) Ivan Dodig (Brazil) Marcelo Melo	6^{5}	7	[10]
(United Kingdom) Jamie Murray (Australia) John Peers	6^{4}	6^{9}
8	(Spain) David Marrero (Spain) Fernando Verdasco	7^{7}	7^{11}

Final
5	(Croatia) Ivan Dodig (Brazil) Marcelo Melo	7^{7}	6^{6}	[10]
8	(Spain) David Marrero (Spain) Fernando Verdasco	6^{2}	7^{8}	[2]

=== Paris Masters ===
==== Singles ====
Quarterfinals
1	(Spain) Rafael Nadal	6	6
9	(France) Richard Gasquet	4	1
3	(Spain) David Ferrer	4	7	6
6	(Czech Republic) Tomáš Berdych	6	5	3
5	(Switzerland) Roger Federer	6	4	6
4	(Argentina) Juan Martín del Potro	3	6	3
7	(Switzerland) Stanislas Wawrinka	1	4
2	(Serbia) Novak Djokovic	6	6

Semifinals
1	(Spain) Rafael Nadal	3	5
3	(Spain) David Ferrer	6	7
5	(Switzerland) Roger Federer	6	3	2
2	(Serbia) Novak Djokovic	4	6	6

Final
3	(Spain) David Ferrer	5	5
2	(Serbia) Novak Djokovic	7	7

==== Doubles ====
Semifinals
1	(United States) Bob Bryan (United States) Mike Bryan	6	7
4	(Croatia) Ivan Dodig (Brazil) Marcelo Melo	4	5
(Belarus) Max Mirnyi (Romania) Horia Tecău	6	2	[3]
2	(Austria) Alexander Peya (Brazil) Bruno Soares	3	6	[10]

Final
1	(United States) Bob Bryan (United States) Mike Bryan	6	6
2	(Austria) Alexander Peya (Brazil) Bruno Soares	3	3

== See also ==
- ATP Masters 1000 tournaments
- 2013 ATP Tour
- 2013 WTA Premier Mandatory and Premier 5 tournaments
- 2013 WTA Tour
