= 2013 WTA Premier Mandatory and Premier 5 tournaments =

Women's professional tennis tour

2013 Premier Mandatory / Premier 5
Details
- Duration: February 11 – October 6
- Edition: 24th
- Tournaments: 9

Achievements (singles)
- Most titles: (United States) Serena Williams (5)
- Most finals: (United States) Serena Williams (7)

The WTA Premier Mandatory and Premier 5 tournaments, which are part of the WTA Premier tournaments, make up the elite tour for professional women's tennis organised by the WTA called the WTA Tour. There are four Premier Mandatory tournaments: Indian Wells, Miami, Madrid and Beijing and five Premier 5 tournaments: Doha, Rome, Canada, Cincinnati and Tokyo.

== Tournaments ==
Tournament	Country	Location	Surface	Date	Prize money
Qatar Total Open	Qatar	Doha	Hard	Feb 11 – 17	$2,369,000
BNP Paribas Open	United States	Indian Wells	Hard	Mar 4 – 17	$5,185,625
Sony Open Tennis	United States	Key Biscayne	Hard	Mar 18 – 31	$5,185,625
Mutua Madrid Open	Spain	Madrid	Clay (red)	May 6 – 12	€4,033,254
Internazionali BNL d'Italia	Italy	Rome	Clay (red)	May 13 – 19	$2,369,000
Rogers Cup	Canada	Toronto	Hard	Aug 5 – 11	$2,369,000
Western & Southern Open	United States	Mason	Hard	Aug 12 – 18	$2,369,000
Toray Pan Pacific Open	Japan	Tokyo	Hard	Sep 23 – 29	$2,369,000
China Open	China	Beijing	Hard	Sep 30 – Oct 6	$5,185,625

== Results ==
* First-time champion

Tournament	Singles champions	Runners-up	Score	Doubles champions	Runners-up	Score
Doha Singles – Doubles	(Belarus) Victoria Azarenka	(United States) Serena Williams	7–6^{(8–6)}, 2–6, 6–3	(Italy) Sara Errani (Italy) Roberta Vinci	(Russia) Nadia Petrova (Slovenia) Katarina Srebotnik	2–6, 6–3, [10–6]
Indian Wells Singles – Doubles	(Russia) Maria Sharapova	(Denmark) Caroline Wozniacki	6–2, 6–2	(Russia) Ekaterina Makarova (Russia) Elena Vesnina	(Russia) Nadia Petrova (Slovenia) Katarina Srebotnik	6–0, 5–7, [10–6]
Miami Singles – Doubles	(United States) Serena Williams	(Russia) Maria Sharapova	4–6, 6–3, 6–0	(Russia) Nadia Petrova (Slovenia) Katarina Srebotnik	(United States) Lisa Raymond (United Kingdom) Laura Robson	6–1, 7–6^{(7–2)}
Madrid Singles – Doubles	(United States) Serena Williams (2)	(Russia) Maria Sharapova	6–1, 6–4	(Russia) Anastasia Pavlyuchenkova* (Czech Republic) Lucie Šafářová*	(Zimbabwe) Cara Black (New Zealand) Marina Erakovic	6–2, 6–4
Rome Singles – Doubles	(United States) Serena Williams (3)	(Belarus) Victoria Azarenka	6–1, 6–3	(Chinese Taipei) Hsieh Su-wei (China) Peng Shuai	(Italy) Sara Errani (Italy) Roberta Vinci	4–6, 6–3, [10–8]
Toronto Singles – Doubles	(United States) Serena Williams (4)	(Romania) Sorana Cîrstea	6–2, 6–0	(Serbia) Jelena Janković*	(Germany) Anna-Lena Grönefeld (Czech Republic) Květa Peschke	5–7, 6–2, [10–6]
Toronto Singles – Doubles	(United States) Serena Williams (4)	(Romania) Sorana Cîrstea	6–2, 6–0	(Slovenia) Katarina Srebotnik (2)	(Germany) Anna-Lena Grönefeld (Czech Republic) Květa Peschke	5–7, 6–2, [10–6]
Cincinnati Singles – Doubles	(Belarus) Victoria Azarenka (2)	(United States) Serena Williams	2–6, 6–2, 7–6^{(8–6)}	(Chinese Taipei) Hsieh Su-wei (2) (China) Peng Shuai (2)	(Germany) Anna-Lena Grönefeld (Czech Republic) Květa Peschke	2–6, 6–3, [12–10]
Tokyo Singles – Doubles	(Czech Republic) Petra Kvitová	(Germany) Angelique Kerber	6–2, 0–6, 6–3	(Zimbabwe) Cara Black (India) Sania Mirza	(Chinese Taipei) Chan Hao-ching (United States) Liezel Huber	4–6, 6–0, [11–9]
Beijing Singles – Doubles	(United States) Serena Williams (5)	(Serbia) Jelena Janković	6–2, 6–2	(Zimbabwe) Cara Black (2) (India) Sania Mirza (2)	(Russia) Vera Dushevina (Spain) Arantxa Parra Santonja	6–2, 6–2

== See also ==
- WTA Premier tournaments
- 2013 WTA Tour
- 2013 ATP Masters 1000
- 2013 ATP Tour
