= 2013 Italian Open – Women's singles =

Women's singles
- 2013 Italian Open

Final
- Champion: (United States) Serena Williams
- Runner-up: (Belarus) Victoria Azarenka
- Score: 6–1, 6–3

Details
- Draw: 56
- Seeds: 16

Events
Singles	men	women
Doubles	men	women
← 2012 ·	Italian Open	· 2014 →

Serena Williams defeated Victoria Azarenka in the final, 6–1, 6–3 to win the women's singles tennis title at the 2013 Italian Open. It was her second Internazionali BNL d'Italia title, and she won it without dropping a set, without dropping more than three games per set, and without dropping more than four games per match. Serena dropped just 14 games in her 5 matches, averaging under 3 games lost per match.

Maria Sharapova was the two-time defending champion, but withdrew in the quarterfinals against Sara Errani due to illness.

== Seeds ==
The top eight seeds receive a bye into the second round.

1. (United States) Serena Williams (champion)
2. (Russia) Maria Sharapova (quarterfinals, withdrew because of illness)
3. (Belarus) Victoria Azarenka (final)
4. (Poland) Agnieszka Radwańska (second round)
5. (China) Li Na (third round)
6. (Germany) Angelique Kerber (withdrew because of an abdominal injury)
7. (Italy) Sara Errani (semifinals)
8. (Czech Republic) Petra Kvitová (third round)
9. (Australia) Samantha Stosur (quarterfinals)
10. (Denmark) Caroline Wozniacki (first round)
11. (Russia) Nadia Petrova (first round)
12. (Russia) Maria Kirilenko (third round, retired)
13. (Italy) Roberta Vinci (third round)
14. (Slovakia) Dominika Cibulková (third round)
15. (Serbia) Ana Ivanovic (first round)
16. (United States) Sloane Stephens (third round)

== Draw ==
=== Key ===
- Q = Qualifier
- WC = Wild card
- LL = Lucky loser
- Alt = Alternate
- ITF = ITF entry
- PR = Protected ranking
- SR = Special ranking
- SE = Special exempt
- JE = Junior exempt
- JR = Junior Accelerator Programme entrant
- CO = College Accelerator Programme entrant
- NG = Next Gen Accelerator Program entrant
- w/o = Walkover
- r = Retired
- d = Defaulted

=== Finals ===
Quarterfinals
1	(United States) Serena Williams	6	6
(Spain) Carla Suárez Navarro	2	0
Q	(Romania) Simona Halep	4	6	7
(Serbia) Jelena Janković	6	0	5
9	(Australia) Samantha Stosur	4	6	3
3	(Belarus) Victoria Azarenka	6	1	6
7	(Italy) Sara Errani	w/o
2	(Russia) Maria Sharapova

Semifinals
1	(United States) Serena Williams	6	6
Q	(Romania) Simona Halep	3	0
3	(Belarus) Victoria Azarenka	6	7
7	(Italy) Sara Errani	0	5

Final
1	(United States) Serena Williams	6	6
3	(Belarus) Victoria Azarenka	1	3

=== Top half ===
==== Section 1 ====
First round
(United States) V Williams	3	2
(United Kingdom) L Robson	6	6
(Russia) E Makarova	6	5	2^{r}
Q	(United States) M Oudin	2	7	4
(France) K Mladenovic	6	2	2
14	(Slovakia) D Cibulková	1	6	6
11	(Russia) N Petrova	6	2	6^{1}
(Spain) C Suárez Navarro	3	6	7^{7}
(Russia) A Pavlyuchenkova	2	0
(Switzerland) R Oprandi	6	6
(Belgium) K Flipkens	4	0
(Belgium) Y Wickmayer	6	6

Second round
1	(United States) S Williams	6	6
(United Kingdom) L Robson	2	2
Q	(United States) M Oudin	7	1	3
14	(Slovakia) D Cibulková	5	6	6
(Spain) C Suárez Navarro	6	6
(Switzerland) R Oprandi	4	2
(Belgium) Y Wickmayer	4	4
LL	(Spain) L Domínguez Lino	6	6

Third round
1	(United States) S Williams	6	6
14	(Slovakia) D Cibulková	0	1
(Spain) C Suárez Navarro	6	6
LL	(Spain) L Domínguez Lino	2	3

Quarterfinals
1	(United States) S Williams	6	6
(Spain) C Suárez Navarro	2	0

==== Section 2 ====
First round
(Russia) S Kuznetsova	1	1
Q	(Romania) S Halep	6	6
WC	(Italy) N Burnett	6	6
(France) A Cornet	2	2
(Russia) E Vesnina	7^{7}	5	4
13	(Italy) R Vinci	6^{2}	7	6
10	(Denmark) C Wozniacki	6	4	6^{5}
(Serbia) B Jovanovski	2	6	7^{7}
(Serbia) J Janković	6	6
(Bulgaria) T Pironkova	3	0
(China) J Zheng	7^{7}	6
(Slovakia) M Rybáriková	6^{0}	3

Second round
4	(Poland) A Radwańska	7^{7}	1	2
Q	(Romania) S Halep	6^{2}	6	6
WC	(Italy) N Burnett	1	4
13	(Italy) R Vinci	6	6
(Serbia) B Jovanovski	2	0
(Serbia) J Janković	6	6
(China) J Zheng	3	1
5	(China) N Li	6	6

Third round
Q	(Romania) S Halep	6	6
13	(Italy) R Vinci	4	2
(Serbia) J Janković	7^{7}	7
5	(China) N Li	6^{2}	5

Quarterfinals
Q	(Romania) S Halep	4	6	7
(Serbia) J Janković	6	0	5

=== Bottom half ===
==== Section 3 ====
First round
(Germany) S Lisicki	6	6
Q	(United States) M Burdette	1	2
(Romania) M Niculescu	6	3	2
(China) S Peng	4	6	6
(Chinese Taipei) S-w Hsieh	2	3
9	(Australia) S Stosur	6	6
15	(Serbia) A Ivanovic	3	6	2
(Poland) U Radwańska	6	2	6
(Romania) S Cîrstea	1	3
(Japan) A Morita	6	6
(Germany) J Görges	2	6	6
Q	(Czech Republic) A Hlaváčková	6	4	4

Second round
8	(Czech Republic) P Kvitová	6	0	7
(Germany) S Lisicki	4	6	5
(China) S Peng	6^{5}	0
9	(Australia) S Stosur	7^{7}	6
(Poland) U Radwańska	3	1
(Japan) A Morita	6	6
(Germany) J Görges	2	0
3	(Belarus) V Azarenka	6	6

Third round
8	(Czech Republic) P Kvitová	5	6	1
9	(Australia) S Stosur	7	2	6
(Japan) A Morita	1	0^{r}
3	(Belarus) V Azarenka	6	2

Quarterfinals
9	(Australia) S Stosur	4	6	3
3	(Belarus) V Azarenka	6	1	6

==== Section 4 ====
First round
WC	(Italy) K Knapp	5	2
(United States) C McHale	7	6
Q	(Ukraine) L Tsurenko	4	2
(United States) V Lepchenko	6	6
Q	(Spain) A Medina Garrigues	3	3
12	(Russia) M Kirilenko	6	6
16	(United States) S Stephens	6	6
WC	(Italy) F Pennetta	3	3
(Italy) F Schiavone	6^{5}	1
(Netherlands) K Bertens	7^{7}	6
Q	(Spain) G Muguruza	1	6	6
Q	(France) M Johansson	6	0	2

Second round
7	(Italy) S Errani	7	5	6
(United States) C McHale	5	7	2
(United States) V Lepchenko	3	1
12	(Russia) M Kirilenko	6	6
16	(United States) S Stephens	4	6	6
(Netherlands) K Bertens	6	3	2
Q	(Spain) G Muguruza	2	2
2	(Russia) M Sharapova	6	6

Third round
7	(Italy) S Errani	6	2
12	(Russia) M Kirilenko	3	0^{r}
16	(United States) S Stephens	2	1
2	(Russia) M Sharapova	6	6

Quarterfinals
7	(Italy) S Errani	w/o
2	(Russia) M Sharapova

== Qualifying ==
=== Seeds ===
1. (Spain) Lourdes Domínguez Lino (qualifying competition, lucky loser)
2. (Switzerland) Stefanie Vögele (first round)
3. (South Africa) Chanelle Scheepers (first round)
4. (Belarus) Olga Govortsova (first round)
5. (United States) Madison Keys (qualifying competition)
6. (Spain) Anabel Medina Garrigues (qualified)
7. (Romania) Simona Halep (qualified)
8. (Spain) Sílvia Soler Espinosa (qualifying competition)
9. (United States) Lauren Davis (qualifying competition)
10. (United States) Jamie Hampton (qualifying competition)
11. (Slovakia) Daniela Hantuchová (qualifying competition)
12. (Ukraine) Lesia Tsurenko (qualified)
13. (Czech Republic) Andrea Hlaváčková (qualified)
14. (Georgia (country)) Anna Tatishvili (first round)
15. (United States) Mallory Burdette (qualified)
16. (Spain) Garbiñe Muguruza (qualified)

=== Qualifiers ===
1. (Czech Republic) Andrea Hlaváčková
2. (Ukraine) Lesia Tsurenko
3. (United States) Melanie Oudin
4. (France) Mathilde Johansson
5. (United States) Mallory Burdette
6. (Spain) Anabel Medina Garrigues
7. (Romania) Simona Halep
8. (Spain) Garbiñe Muguruza

=== Lucky losers ===
1. (Spain) Lourdes Domínguez Lino

=== Draw ===
==== First qualifier ====
First round
1	(Spain) Lourdes Domínguez Lino	6	6^{4}	6
(Croatia) Mirjana Lučić-Baroni	4	7^{7}	2
(Australia) Anastasia Rodionova	3	6	1
13	(Czech Republic) Andrea Hlaváčková	6	3	6

Qualifying competition
1	(Spain) Lourdes Domínguez Lino	4	6	5
13	(Czech Republic) Andrea Hlaváčková	6	3	7

==== Second qualifier ====
First round
2	(Switzerland) Stefanie Vögele	6^{4}	2
(Spain) María Teresa Torró Flor	7^{7}	6
(Colombia) Mariana Duque	3	3
12	(Ukraine) Lesia Tsurenko	6	6

Qualifying competition
(Spain) María Teresa Torró Flor	6	6^{4}	2
12	(Ukraine) Lesia Tsurenko	4	7^{7}	6

==== Third qualifier ====
First round
3	(South Africa) Chanelle Scheepers	4	0
(United States) Melanie Oudin	6	6
WC	(Italy) Federica di Sarra	6^{0}	4
10	(United States) Jamie Hampton	7^{7}	6

Qualifying competition
(United States) Melanie Oudin	4	6	6
10	(United States) Jamie Hampton	6	3	3

==== Fourth qualifier ====
First round
4	(Belarus) Olga Govortsova	6	3	1
(France) Mathilde Johansson	3	6	6
(Czech Republic) Eva Birnerová	4	1
9	(United States) Lauren Davis	6	6

Qualifying competition
(France) Mathilde Johansson	6	6
9	(United States) Lauren Davis	3	2

==== Fifth qualifier ====
First round
5	(United States) Madison Keys	6	6
(China) Zhang Shuai	2	4
(Croatia) Petra Martić	3	4
15	(United States) Mallory Burdette	6	6

Qualifying competition
5	(United States) Madison Keys	6	4	1
15	(United States) Mallory Burdette	3	6	6

==== Sixth qualifier ====
First round
6	(Spain) Anabel Medina Garrigues	4	6	6
WC	(Italy) Alexia Virgili	6	2	2
(Kazakhstan) Yulia Putintseva	6	6
14	(Georgia (country)) Anna Tatishvili	2	1

Qualifying competition
6	(Spain) Anabel Medina Garrigues	4	7^{7}	7
(Kazakhstan) Yulia Putintseva	6	6^{3}	5

==== Seventh qualifier ====
First round
7	(Romania) Simona Halep	6	6
WC	(Italy) Alice Balducci	1	0
(Kazakhstan) Galina Voskoboeva	2	5
11	(Slovakia) Daniela Hantuchová	6	7

Qualifying competition
7	(Romania) Simona Halep	6	6
11	(Slovakia) Daniela Hantuchová	4	2

==== Eighth qualifier ====
First round
8	(Spain) Sílvia Soler Espinosa	6	6
(Kazakhstan) Sesil Karatantcheva	4	0
WC	(Italy) Angelica Moratelli	1	1
16	(Spain) Garbiñe Muguruza	6	6

Qualifying competition
8	(Spain) Sílvia Soler Espinosa	2	3
16	(Spain) Garbiñe Muguruza	6	6
