= 2013 Italian Open – Men's singles =

Men's singles
- 2013 Italian Open

Final
- Champion: (Spain) Rafael Nadal
- Runner-up: (Switzerland) Roger Federer
- Score: 6–1, 6–3

Events
Singles	men	women
Doubles	men	women
← 2012 ·	Italian Open	· 2014 →

Defending champion Rafael Nadal defeated Roger Federer in the final, 6–1, 6–3 to win the men's singles tennis title at the 2013 Italian Open. It was his record-extending seventh Italian Open title.

== Seeds ==
The top eight seeds receive a bye into the second round :

1. (Serbia) Novak Djokovic (quarterfinals)
2. (Switzerland) Roger Federer (final)
3. (United Kingdom) Andy Murray (second round, retired because of a back injury)
4. (Spain) David Ferrer (quarterfinals)
5. (Spain) Rafael Nadal (champion)
6. (Czech Republic) Tomáš Berdych (semifinals)
7. (Argentina) Juan Martín del Potro (third round)
8. (France) Jo-Wilfried Tsonga (second round)
9. (France) Richard Gasquet (third round)
10. (Serbia) ~~Janko Tipsarević~~ (withdrew because of bronchitis)
11. (Croatia) Marin Čilić (second round)
12. (Spain) Nicolás Almagro (first round)
13. (Germany) Tommy Haas (first round)
14. (Canada) Milos Raonic (first round)
15. (Switzerland) Stan Wawrinka (second round, withdrew because of a thigh injury)
16. (Japan) Kei Nishikori (second round)

== Draw ==
=== Key ===
- Q = Qualifier
- WC = Wild card
- LL = Lucky loser
- Alt = Alternate
- ITF = ITF entry
- PR = Protected ranking
- SR = Special ranking
- SE = Special exempt
- JE = Junior exempt
- JR = Junior Accelerator Programme entrant
- CO = College Accelerator Programme entrant
- NG = Next Gen Accelerator Program entrant
- w/o = Walkover
- r = Retired
- d = Defaulted

=== Finals ===
Quarterfinals
1	(Serbia) Novak Djokovic	6	5	4
6	(Czech Republic) Tomáš Berdych	2	7	6
4	(Spain) David Ferrer	4	6	2
5	(Spain) Rafael Nadal	6	4	6
(France) Benoît Paire	6	6
(Spain) Marcel Granollers	1	0
(Poland) Jerzy Janowicz	4	6^{2}
2	(Switzerland) Roger Federer	6	7^{7}

Semifinals
6	(Czech Republic) Tomáš Berdych	2	4
5	(Spain) Rafael Nadal	6	6
(France) Benoît Paire	6^{5}	4
2	(Switzerland) Roger Federer	7^{7}	6

Final
5	(Spain) Rafael Nadal	6	6
2	(Switzerland) Roger Federer	1	3

=== Top half ===
==== Section 1 ====
First round
Q	(Spain) A Montañés	3	7	6
(Slovakia) M Kližan	6	5	3
WC	(Italy) M Viola	4	3
(Ukraine) A Dolgopolov	6	6
Q	(Argentina) C Berlocq	7	3	3
15	(Switzerland) S Wawrinka	5	6	6
11	(Croatia) M Čilić	6	6
Q	(Kazakhstan) A Golubev	4	2
(South Africa) K Anderson	6	6
(Austria) J Melzer	1	2
(Uzbekistan) D Istomin	5	7^{7}	6
(United States) J Isner	7	6^{5}	3

Second round
1	(Serbia) N Djokovic	6	6
Q	(Spain) A Montañés	2	3
(Ukraine) A Dolgopolov	w/o
15	(Switzerland) S Wawrinka
11	(Croatia) M Čilić	3	6^{7}
(South Africa) K Anderson	6	7^{9}
(Uzbekistan) D Istomin	4	0
6	(Czech Republic) T Berdych	6	6

Third round
1	(Serbia) N Djokovic	6	6
(Ukraine) A Dolgopolov	1	4
(South Africa) K Anderson	5	2
6	(Czech Republic) T Berdych	7	6

Quarterfinals
1	(Serbia) N Djokovic	6	5	4
6	(Czech Republic) T Berdych	2	7	6

==== Section 2 ====
First round
(Argentina) H Zeballos	3	6	3
(Spain) F Verdasco	6	3	6
(Spain) A Ramos	7	6
Q	(Czech Republic) J Hájek	5	0
(Germany) P Kohlschreiber	7^{7}	6
14	(Canada) M Raonic	6^{2}	4
LL	(Czech Republic) L Rosol	6	1	4
(Serbia) V Troicki	3	6	6
(Finland) J Nieminen	2	6^{6}
Q	(Latvia) E Gulbis	6	7^{8}
(Italy) F Fognini	6	6
(Italy) A Seppi	4	1

Second round
4	(Spain) D Ferrer	5	7	6
(Spain) F Verdasco	7	5	3
(Spain) A Ramos	4	1
(Germany) P Kohlschreiber	6	6
(Serbia) V Troicki	1	1
Q	(Latvia) E Gulbis	6	6
(Italy) F Fognini	1	3
5	(Spain) R Nadal	6	6

Third round
4	(Spain) D Ferrer	w/o
(Germany) P Kohlschreiber
Q	(Latvia) E Gulbis	6	5	4
5	(Spain) R Nadal	1	7	6

Quarterfinals
4	(Spain) D Ferrer	4	6	2
5	(Spain) R Nadal	6	4	6

=== Bottom half ===
==== Section 3 ====
First round
Q	(Russia) A Kuznetsov	6	3
(Belgium) X Malisse	2	1^{r}
(Argentina) J Mónaco	6^{4}	6	4
(France) B Paire	7^{7}	1	6
(France) J Benneteau	7^{7}	6
12	(Spain) N Almagro	6^{2}	4
16	(Japan) K Nishikori	6	6
WC	(Italy) P Lorenzi	2	4
(France) J Chardy	3	7	7^{7}
(Spain) F López	6	5	6^{4}
(Spain) M Granollers	6	6
(Russia) N Davydenko	3	4

Second round
7	(Argentina) JM del Potro	6	6
Q	(Russia) A Kuznetsov	3	2
(France) B Paire	6^{3}	6	7^{7}
(France) J Benneteau	7^{7}	4	6^{4}
16	(Japan) K Nishikori	4	1
(France) J Chardy	6	6
(Spain) M Granollers	6	6^{5}	0
3	(United Kingdom) A Murray	3	7^{7}	0^{r}

Third round
7	(Argentina) JM del Potro	4	6^{3}
(France) B Paire	6	7^{7}
(France) J Chardy	4	6	5
(Spain) M Granollers	6	1	7

Quarterfinals
(France) B Paire	6	6
(Spain) M Granollers	1	0

==== Section 4 ====
First round
Q	(Colombia) S Giraldo	5	2
(Poland) J Janowicz	7	6
(Cyprus) M Baghdatis	3	4
(Bulgaria) G Dimitrov	6	6
(United States) S Querrey	2	6^{8}
9	(France) R Gasquet	6	7^{10}
13	(Germany) T Haas	4	3
(Russia) M Youzhny	6	6
WC	(Italy) F Volandri	3	6	4
(France) G Simon	6	2	6
(Czech Republic) R Štěpánek	6	4	3
WC	(Italy) P Starace	4	6	6

Second round
8	(France) J-W Tsonga	4	6^{5}
(Poland) J Janowicz	6	7^{7}
(Bulgaria) G Dimitrov	4	4
9	(France) R Gasquet	6	6
(Russia) M Youzhny	5	3
(France) G Simon	7	6
WC	(Italy) P Starace	1	2
2	(Switzerland) R Federer	6	6

Third round
(Poland) J Janowicz	3	7^{7}	6
9	(France) R Gasquet	6	6^{2}	4
(France) G Simon	1	2
2	(Switzerland) R Federer	6	6

Quarterfinals
(Poland) J Janowicz	4	6^{2}
2	(Switzerland) R Federer	6	7^{7}

== Qualifying ==
=== Seeds ===
1. (Czech Republic) Lukáš Rosol (qualifying competition, lucky loser)
2. (Latvia) Ernests Gulbis (qualified)
3. (Slovenia) Grega Žemlja (qualifying competition)
4. (Russia) Dmitry Tursunov (first round, retired)
5. (Argentina) Carlos Berlocq (qualified)
6. (Lithuania) Ričardas Berankis (first round)
7. (Russia) Evgeny Donskoy (first round)
8. (Colombia) Santiago Giraldo (qualified)
9. (Russia) Andrey Kuznetsov (qualified)
10. (Brazil) Rogério Dutra da Silva (first round)
11. (Netherlands) Thiemo de Bakker (first round)
12. (Spain) Albert Montañés (qualified)
13. (Canada) Jesse Levine (first round)
14. (Slovenia) Blaž Kavčič (qualifying competition)

=== Qualifiers ===
1. (Russia) Andrey Kuznetsov
2. (Latvia) Ernests Gulbis
3. (Kazakhstan) Andrey Golubev
4. (Czech Republic) Jan Hájek
5. (Argentina) Carlos Berlocq
6. (Spain) Albert Montañés
7. (Colombia) Santiago Giraldo

=== Lucky losers ===
1. (Czech Republic) Lukáš Rosol

=== Qualifying draw ===
==== First qualifier ====
First round
1	(Czech Republic) Lukáš Rosol	0	6	6
(Italy) Flavio Cipolla	6	1	2
(Austria) Andreas Haider-Maurer	3	1
9	(Russia) Andrey Kuznetsov	6	6

Qualifying competition
1	(Czech Republic) Lukáš Rosol	6^{4}	4
9	(Russia) Andrey Kuznetsov	7^{7}	6

==== Second qualifier ====
First round
2	(Latvia) Ernests Gulbis	6	7^{8}
(Romania) Adrian Ungur	1	6^{6}
WC	(Italy) Gianluca Naso	6	6
10	(Brazil) Rogério Dutra da Silva	4	3

Qualifying competition
2	(Latvia) Ernests Gulbis	6	6
WC	(Italy) Gianluca Naso	3	2

==== Third qualifier ====
First round
3	(Slovenia) Grega Žemlja	6	6
PR	(Russia) Igor Andreev	4	4
Alt	(Kazakhstan) Andrey Golubev	6^{1}	6	6
13	(Canada) Jesse Levine	7^{7}	3	2

Qualifying competition
3	(Slovenia) Grega Žemlja	6	4	6^{3}
Alt	(Kazakhstan) Andrey Golubev	2	6	7^{7}

==== Fourth qualifier ====
First round
4	(Russia) Dmitry Tursunov	4^{r}
(Ukraine) Illya Marchenko	3
(Czech Republic) Jan Hájek	7^{7}	7^{7}
11	(Netherlands) Thiemo de Bakker	6^{3}	6^{5}

Qualifying competition
(Ukraine) Illya Marchenko	2	4
(Czech Republic) Jan Hájek	6	6

==== Fifth qualifier ====
First round
5	(Argentina) Carlos Berlocq	7^{7}	6
WC	(Italy) Thomas Fabbiano	6^{1}	4
(France) Adrian Mannarino	6	2	4
14	(Slovenia) Blaž Kavčič	2	6	6

Qualifying competition
5	(Argentina) Carlos Berlocq	6	7
14	(Slovenia) Blaž Kavčič	1	5

==== Sixth qualifier ====
First round
6	(Lithuania) Ričardas Berankis	4	6	5
(Canada) Vasek Pospisil	6	4	7
WC	(Italy) Alessandro Giannessi	4	3
12	(Spain) Albert Montañés	6	6

Qualifying competition
(Canada) Vasek Pospisil	2	3
12	(Spain) Albert Montañés	6	6

==== Seventh qualifier ====
First round
7	(Russia) Evgeny Donskoy	4	4
WC	(Italy) Marco Cecchinato	6	6
(Germany) Matthias Bachinger	6^{5}	4
8	(Colombia) Santiago Giraldo	7^{7}	6

Qualifying competition
WC	(Italy) Marco Cecchinato	5	2
8	(Colombia) Santiago Giraldo	7	6
