= 2013 Sony Open Tennis – Men's doubles =

Men's doubles
- 2013 Sony Open Tennis

Final
- Champions: (Pakistan) Aisam-ul-Haq Qureshi (Netherlands) Jean-Julien Rojer
- Runners-up: (Poland) Mariusz Fyrstenberg (Poland) Marcin Matkowski
- Score: 6–4, 6–1

Events
Singles	men	women
Doubles	men	women
← 2012 ·	Miami Masters	· 2014 →

Leander Paes and Radek Štěpánek were the defending champions, but did not compete as a team this year.
Štěpánek did not enter the tournament, citing an injury, while Paes played alongside Michaël Llodra, but lost in the second round to Grigor Dimitrov and Frederik Nielsen.
Aisam-ul-Haq Qureshi and Jean-Julien Rojer won the title, defeating Mariusz Fyrstenberg and Marcin Matkowski in the final 6–4, 6–1.

== Seeds ==
1. (United States) Bob Bryan / (United States) Mike Bryan (first round)
2. (Spain) Marcel Granollers / (Spain) Marc López (semifinals)
3. (India) Mahesh Bhupathi / (Canada) Daniel Nestor (second round)
4. (Sweden) Robert Lindstedt / (Serbia) Nenad Zimonjić (quarterfinals)
5. (Pakistan) Aisam-ul-Haq Qureshi / (Netherlands) Jean-Julien Rojer (champions)
6. (Austria) Alexander Peya / (Brazil) Bruno Soares (first round)
7. (France) Michaël Llodra / (India) Leander Paes (second round)
8. (Poland) Mariusz Fyrstenberg / (Poland) Marcin Matkowski (final)

== Draw ==
=== Key ===
- Q = Qualifier
- WC = Wild card
- LL = Lucky loser
- Alt = Alternate
- SE = Special exempt
- PR = Protected ranking
- ITF = ITF entry
- JE = Junior exempt
- w/o = Walkover
- r = Retired
- d = Defaulted
- SR = Special ranking

=== Finals ===
Semifinals
(Bulgaria) Grigor Dimitrov (Denmark) Frederik Nielsen	4	2
8	(Poland) Mariusz Fyrstenberg (Poland) Marcin Matkowski	6	6
5	(Pakistan) Aisam-ul-Haq Qureshi (Netherlands) Jean-Julien Rojer	6	6
2	(Spain) Marcel Granollers (Spain) Marc López	3	2

Final
8	(Poland) Mariusz Fyrstenberg (Poland) Marcin Matkowski	4	1
5	(Pakistan) Aisam-ul-Haq Qureshi (Netherlands) Jean-Julien Rojer	6	6

=== Top half ===
First round
1	(United States) B Bryan (United States) M Bryan	4	6	[5]
(Belarus) M Mirnyi (Russia) M Youzhny	6	2	[10]
(Germany) T Haas (Belgium) X Malisse	6	6
(Austria) J Melzer (Germany) P Petzschner	4	1
WC	(United States) C Harrison (United States) R Harrison	2	2
(Bulgaria) G Dimitrov (Denmark) F Nielsen	6	6
(Germany) C Kas (Germany) P Kohlschreiber	3	5
7	(France) M Llodra (India) L Paes	6	7
4	(Sweden) R Lindstedt (Serbia) N Zimonjić	7^{9}	6
(Slovakia) M Kližan (Italy) A Seppi	6^{7}	4
(Croatia) I Dodig (Brazil) M Melo	7	6
WC	(Australia) L Hewitt (Australia) B Tomic	5	3
(United Kingdom) C Fleming (United Kingdom) J Marray	6	6^{9}	[11]
(Poland) Ł Kubot (Serbia) J Tipsarević	3	7^{11}	[13]
(Brazil) T Bellucci (Argentina) H Zeballos
8	(Poland) M Fyrstenberg (Poland) M Matkowski	w/o

Second round
(Belarus) M Mirnyi (Russia) M Youzhny	6	4	[8]
(Germany) T Haas (Belgium) X Malisse	3	6	[10]
(Bulgaria) G Dimitrov (Denmark) F Nielsen	7^{7}	7^{7}
7	(France) M Llodra (India) L Paes	6^{6}	6^{4}
4	(Sweden) R Lindstedt (Serbia) N Zimonjić	7	6
(Croatia) I Dodig (Brazil) M Melo	5	4
(Poland) Ł Kubot (Serbia) J Tipsarević	6	3	[5]
8	(Poland) M Fyrstenberg (Poland) M Matkowski	4	6	[10]

Quarterfinals
(Germany) T Haas (Belgium) X Malisse	4	6	[7]
(Bulgaria) G Dimitrov (Denmark) F Nielsen	6	2	[10]
4	(Sweden) R Lindstedt (Serbia) N Zimonjić	4	6	[8]
8	(Poland) M Fyrstenberg (Poland) M Matkowski	6	2	[10]

Semifinals
(Bulgaria) G Dimitrov (Denmark) F Nielsen	4	2
8	(Poland) M Fyrstenberg (Poland) M Matkowski	6	6

=== Bottom half ===
First round
5	(Pakistan) A-u-H Qureshi (Netherlands) J-J Rojer	4	6	[10]
(Poland) J Janowicz (Germany) F Mayer	6	4	[6]
(United States) J Isner (United States) S Querrey	4	3
(Philippines) TC Huey (United Kingdom) D Inglot	6	6
(Spain) N Almagro (Austria) O Marach	6	6
(Colombia) JS Cabal (Mexico) S González	3	4
(France) R Gasquet (France) É Roger-Vasselin	6^{3}	3
3	(India) M Bhupathi (Canada) D Nestor	7^{7}	6
6	(Austria) A Peya (Brazil) B Soares	5	4
(Spain) D Marrero (Spain) F Verdasco	7	6
(Croatia) M Čilić (Czech Republic) L Dlouhý	7^{12}	6
(Italy) D Bracciali (Austria) J Knowle	6^{10}	2
(United States) E Butorac (Australia) P Hanley	6^{8}	4
(India) R Bopanna (United States) R Ram	7^{10}	6
(France) G Simon (Serbia) V Troicki	3	1
2	(Spain) M Granollers (Spain) M López	6	6

Second round
5	(Pakistan) A-u-H Qureshi (Netherlands) J-J Rojer	4	6	[14]
(Philippines) TC Huey (United Kingdom) D Inglot	6	3	[12]
(Spain) N Almagro (Austria) O Marach	6	6
3	(India) M Bhupathi (Canada) D Nestor	3	3
(Spain) D Marrero (Spain) F Verdasco	3	6	[7]
(Croatia) M Čilić (Czech Republic) L Dlouhý	6	3	[10]
(India) R Bopanna (United States) R Ram	4	6^{5}
2	(Spain) M Granollers (Spain) M López	6	7^{7}

Quarterfinals
5	(Pakistan) A-u-H Qureshi (Netherlands) J-J Rojer	7^{7}	6
(Spain) N Almagro (Austria) O Marach	6^{5}	4
(Croatia) M Čilić (Czech Republic) L Dlouhý	1	5
2	(Spain) M Granollers (Spain) M López	6	7

Semifinals
5	(Pakistan) A-u-H Qureshi (Netherlands) J-J Rojer	6	6
2	(Spain) M Granollers (Spain) M López	3	2
