= 2013 Sony Open Tennis – Women's doubles =

Women's doubles
- 2013 Sony Open Tennis

Final
- Champion: (Russia) Nadia Petrova (Slovenia) Katarina Srebotnik
- Runner-up: (United States) Lisa Raymond (United Kingdom) Laura Robson
- Score: 6–1, 7–6^{(7–2)}

Events
Singles	men	women
Doubles	men	women
← 2012 ·	Miami Masters	· 2014 →

Maria Kirilenko and Nadia Petrova were the defending champions, but Kirilenko chose not to compete this year.
Petrova teamed with Katarina Srebotnik and successfully defended the title, defeating Lisa Raymond and Laura Robson in the final 6–1, 7–6^{(7–2)}.

== Seeds ==
1. (Italy) Sara Errani / (Italy) Roberta Vinci (semifinals)
2. (Czech Republic) Andrea Hlaváčková / (Czech Republic) Lucie Hradecká (first round)
3. (Russia) Nadia Petrova / (Slovenia) Katarina Srebotnik (champions)
4. (Russia) Ekaterina Makarova / (Russia) Elena Vesnina (quarterfinals)
5. (United States) Liezel Huber / (Spain) María José Martínez Sánchez (quarterfinals, withdrew because of a left knee injury for Martínez Sánchez)
6. (United States) Raquel Kops-Jones / (United States) Abigail Spears (first round)
7. (United States) Bethanie Mattek-Sands / (India) Sania Mirza (quarterfinals)
8. (Germany) Julia Görges / (Kazakhstan) Yaroslava Shvedova (quarterfinals)

== Draw ==
=== Key ===
- Q = Qualifier
- WC = Wild card
- LL = Lucky loser
- Alt = Alternate
- SE = Special exempt
- PR = Protected ranking
- ITF = ITF entry
- JE = Junior exempt
- w/o = Walkover
- r = Retired
- d = Defaulted
- SR = Special ranking

=== Finals ===
Semifinals
1	(Italy) Sara Errani (Italy) Roberta Vinci	1	2
WC	(United States) Lisa Raymond (United Kingdom) Laura Robson	6	6
3	(Russia) Nadia Petrova (Slovenia) Katarina Srebotnik	6	3	[10]
WC	(Russia) Svetlana Kuznetsova (Italy) Flavia Pennetta	3	6	[6]

Final
WC	(United States) Lisa Raymond (United Kingdom) Laura Robson	1	6^{2}
3	(Russia) Nadia Petrova (Slovenia) Katarina Srebotnik	6	7^{7}

=== Top half ===
First round
1	(Italy) S Errani (Italy) R Vinci	6^{5}	6	[11]
(Japan) K Date-Krumm (Australia) C Dellacqua	7^{7}	2	[9]
(Hungary) T Babos (Luxembourg) M Minella	6	6
(Latvia) L Dekmeijere (Belarus) O Govortsova	2	2
(Zimbabwe) C Black (Australia) A Rodionova	7	4	[10]
(Australia) J Gajdošová (Germany) S Lisicki	5	6	[12]
(Czech Republic) E Birnerová (United States) V Lepchenko	5	3
7	(United States) B Mattek-Sands (India) S Mirza	7	6
4	(Russia) E Makarova (Russia) E Vesnina	6^{5}	6	[10]
(South Africa) N Grandin (Czech Republic) V Uhlířová	7^{7}	3	[6]
(Russia) A Pavlyuchenkova (Czech Republic) L Šafářová	7^{7}	7
WC	(Spain) G Muguruza (Italy) F Schiavone	6^{5}	5
(Romania) I-C Begu (Poland) A Rosolska	5	6^{4}
Alt	(Germany) T Malek (Thailand) T Tanasugarn	7	7^{7}
WC	(United States) L Raymond (United Kingdom) L Robson	7	6
6	(United States) R Kops-Jones (United States) A Spears	5	2

Second round
1	(Italy) S Errani (Italy) R Vinci	5	6	[10]
(Hungary) T Babos (Luxembourg) M Minella	7	4	[4]
(Australia) J Gajdošová (Germany) S Lisicki	1	6	[7]
7	(United States) B Mattek-Sands (India) S Mirza	6	3	[10]
4	(Russia) E Makarova (Russia) E Vesnina	7^{7}	6
(Russia) A Pavlyuchenkova (Czech Republic) L Šafářová	6^{3}	0
Alt	(Germany) T Malek (Thailand) T Tanasugarn	6	1	[8]
WC	(United States) L Raymond (United Kingdom) L Robson	4	6	[10]

Quarterfinals
1	(Italy) S Errani (Italy) R Vinci	6	6
7	(United States) B Mattek-Sands (India) S Mirza	1	4
4	(Russia) E Makarova (Russia) E Vesnina	3	5
WC	(United States) L Raymond (United Kingdom) L Robson	6	7

Semifinals
1	(Italy) S Errani (Italy) R Vinci	1	2
WC	(United States) L Raymond (United Kingdom) L Robson	6	6

=== Bottom half ===
First round
8	(Germany) J Görges (Kazakhstan) Y Shvedova	2	7	[10]
(Croatia) D Jurak (Hungary) K Marosi	6	5	[8]
(Slovakia) D Hantuchová (Spain) A Medina Garrigues	6	6
WC	(United States) M Keys (Croatia) A Tomljanović	2	3
(Russia) V Dushevina (Spain) A Parra Santonja	3	2
(United States) M Moulton-Levy (China) S Zhang	6	6
(Chinese Taipei) H-c Chan (Slovakia) J Husárová	2	1
3	(Russia) N Petrova (Slovenia) K Srebotnik	6	6
5	(United States) L Huber (Spain) MJ Martínez Sánchez	7^{7}	6^{5}	[10]
(France) K Mladenovic (Kazakhstan) G Voskoboeva	6^{2}	7^{7}	[4]
(Germany) A-L Grönefeld (Croatia) P Martić	2	6	[11]
(United States) V King (Romania) M Niculescu	6	2	[9]
(Chinese Taipei) S-w Hsieh (China) S Peng	1	6	[10]
(Croatia) M Lučić-Baroni (China) J Zheng	6	2	[6]
WC	(Russia) S Kuznetsova (Italy) F Pennetta	7	6
2	(Czech Republic) A Hlaváčková (Czech Republic) L Hradecká	5	4

Second round
8	(Germany) J Görges (Kazakhstan) Y Shvedova	7	6
(Slovakia) D Hantuchová (Spain) A Medina Garrigues	5	2
(United States) M Moulton-Levy (China) S Zhang	0	6	[7]
3	(Russia) N Petrova (Slovenia) K Srebotnik	6	4	[10]
5	(United States) L Huber (Spain) MJ Martínez Sánchez	6	6
(Germany) A-L Grönefeld (Croatia) P Martić	4	2
(Chinese Taipei) S-w Hsieh (China) S Peng	2	2
WC	(Russia) S Kuznetsova (Italy) F Pennetta	6	6

Quarterfinals
8	(Germany) J Görges (Kazakhstan) Y Shvedova	4	6^{3}
3	(Russia) N Petrova (Slovenia) K Srebotnik	6	7^{7}
5	(United States) L Huber (Spain) MJ Martínez Sánchez
WC	(Russia) S Kuznetsova (Italy) F Pennetta	w/o

Semifinals
3	(Russia) N Petrova (Slovenia) K Srebotnik	6	3	[10]
WC	(Russia) S Kuznetsova (Italy) F Pennetta	3	6	[6]
