= 2013 Italian Open – Men's doubles =

2013 Italian Open (tennis)

Men's doubles
- 2013 Italian Open

Final
- Champions: (United States) Bob Bryan (United States) Mike Bryan
- Runners-up: (India) Mahesh Bhupathi (India) Rohan Bopanna
- Score: 6–2, 6–3

Events
Singles	men	women
Doubles	men	women
← 2012 ·	Italian Open	· 2014 →

Marcel Granollers and Marc López were the defending champions, but lost to Santiago González and Scott Lipsky in the quarterfinals.
Bob Bryan and Mike Bryan won the title, defeating Mahesh Bhupathi and Rohan Bopanna in the final, 6–2, 6–3.

== Seeds ==
All seeds receive a bye into the second round.

1. (United States) Bob Bryan / (United States) Mike Bryan (champions)
2. (Spain) Marcel Granollers / (Spain) Marc López (quarterfinals)
3. (Sweden) Robert Lindstedt / (Canada) Daniel Nestor (quarterfinals)
4. (Pakistan) Aisam-ul-Haq Qureshi / (Netherlands) Jean-Julien Rojer (second round)
5. (Belarus) Max Mirnyi / (Romania) Horia Tecău (semifinals)
6. (India) Mahesh Bhupathi / (India) Rohan Bopanna (final)
7. (Austria) Alexander Peya / (Brazil) Bruno Soares (second round)
8. (Austria) Jürgen Melzer / (India) Leander Paes (second round)

== Draw ==
=== Key ===
- Q = Qualifier
- WC = Wild card
- LL = Lucky loser
- Alt = Alternate
- SE = Special exempt
- PR = Protected ranking
- ITF = ITF entry
- JE = Junior exempt
- w/o = Walkover
- r = Retired
- d = Defaulted
- SR = Special ranking

=== Finals ===
Semifinals
1	(United States) Bob Bryan (United States) Mike Bryan	6	6^{2}	[10]
5	(Belarus) Max Mirnyi (Romania) Horia Tecău	4	7^{7}	[3]
6	(India) Mahesh Bhupathi (India) Rohan Bopanna	6	7^{7}
(Mexico) Santiago González (United States) Scott Lipsky	3	6^{3}

Final
1	(United States) Bob Bryan (United States) Mike Bryan	6	6
6	(India) Mahesh Bhupathi (India) Rohan Bopanna	2	3

=== Top half ===
First round
WC	(Italy) P Lorenzi (Italy) P Starace	6	2	[10]
(Cyprus) M Baghdatis (Argentina) JM del Potro	2	6	[8]
(France) J Chardy (Philippines) TC Huey	3	6^{4}
(Spain) D Marrero (Spain) F Verdasco	6	7^{7}
WC	(Italy) F Cipolla (Italy) F Volandri	6	4	[10]
(Italy) F Fognini (Slovakia) M Kližan	3	6	[6]
(Austria) J Knowle (Slovakia) F Polášek	2	4
Alt	(Czech Republic) L Rosol (Serbia) V Troicki	6	6

Second round
1	(United States) B Bryan (United States) M Bryan	6	6
WC	(Italy) P Lorenzi (Italy) P Starace	1	4
(Spain) D Marrero (Spain) F Verdasco	6	7^{7}
7	(Austria) A Peya (Brazil) B Soares	3	6^{4}
3	(Sweden) R Lindstedt (Canada) D Nestor	6	6
WC	(Italy) F Cipolla (Italy) F Volandri	4	3
Alt	(Czech Republic) L Rosol (Serbia) V Troicki	5	1
5	(Belarus) M Mirnyi (Romania) H Tecău	7	6

Quarterfinals
1	(United States) B Bryan (United States) M Bryan	6	7
(Spain) D Marrero (Spain) F Verdasco	4	5
3	(Sweden) R Lindstedt (Canada) D Nestor	6^{5}	4
5	(Belarus) M Mirnyi (Romania) H Tecău	7^{7}	6

Semifinals
1	(United States) B Bryan (United States) M Bryan	6	6^{2}	[10]
5	(Belarus) M Mirnyi (Romania) H Tecău	4	7^{7}	[3]

=== Bottom half ===
First round
(United States) J Isner (United States) S Querrey	5	7^{10}	[10]
(United Kingdom) D Inglot (United Kingdom) J Marray	7	6^{8}	[12]
(Czech Republic) T Berdych (Czech Republic) R Štěpánek	6	6
(Italy) D Bracciali (Italy) A Seppi	4	2
(Bulgaria) G Dimitrov (Denmark) F Nielsen	4	3
(Mexico) S González (United States) S Lipsky	6	6
(Poland) M Fyrstenberg (Poland) M Matkowski	7^{7}	5	[4]
(France) J Benneteau (Serbia) N Zimonjić	6^{3}	7	[10]

Second round
6	(India) M Bhupathi (India) R Bopanna	6	6
(United Kingdom) D Inglot (United Kingdom) J Marray	2	3
(Czech Republic) T Berdych (Czech Republic) R Štěpánek	7	6
4	(Pakistan) A-u-H Qureshi (Netherlands) J-J Rojer	5	4
8	(Austria) J Melzer (India) L Paes	6^{4}	6^{3}
(Mexico) S González (United States) S Lipsky	7^{7}	7^{7}
(France) J Benneteau (Serbia) N Zimonjić	4	7^{7}	[8]
2	(Spain) M Granollers (Spain) M López	6	6^{4}	[10]

Quarterfinals
6	(India) M Bhupathi (India) R Bopanna	w/o
(Czech Republic) T Berdych (Czech Republic) R Štěpánek
(Mexico) S González (United States) S Lipsky	1	6	[10]
2	(Spain) M Granollers (Spain) M López	6	4	[6]

Semifinals
6	(India) M Bhupathi (India) R Bopanna	6	7^{7}
(Mexico) S González (United States) S Lipsky	3	6^{3}
