= 2013 Sony Open Tennis – Women's singles =

Tennis tournament

Women's singles
- 2013 Sony Open Tennis

Final
- Champion: (United States) Serena Williams
- Runner-up: (Russia) Maria Sharapova
- Score: 4–6, 6–3, 6–0

Details
- Draw: 96
- Seeds: 32

Events
Singles	men	women
Doubles	men	women
← 2012 ·	Miami Masters	· 2014 →

Serena Williams defeated Maria Sharapova in the final, 4–6, 6–3, 6–0 to win the women's singles tennis title at the 2013 Miami Open. It was her record sixth Miami Open title, and Sharapova's fifth runner-up finish without winning the title.

Agnieszka Radwańska was the defending champion, but lost in the semifinals to Williams.

== Seeds ==
All seeds receive a bye into the second round.

1. (United States) Serena Williams (champion)
2. (Belarus) Victoria Azarenka (withdrew because of a right ankle injury)
3. (Russia) Maria Sharapova (final)
4. (Poland) Agnieszka Radwańska (semifinals)
5. (China) Li Na (quarterfinals)
6. (Germany) Angelique Kerber (third round)
7. (Czech Republic) Petra Kvitová (third round)
8. (Italy) Sara Errani (quarterfinals)
9. (Denmark) Caroline Wozniacki (third round)
10. (France) Marion Bartoli (second round, retired because of a left foot injury)
11. (Russia) Nadia Petrova (third round)
12. (Serbia) Ana Ivanovic (fourth round)
13. (Slovakia) Dominika Cibulková (fourth round)
14. (Russia) Maria Kirilenko (third round)
15. (Italy) Roberta Vinci (quarterfinals)
16. (United States) Sloane Stephens (fourth round)
17. (Czech Republic) Lucie Šafářová (second round)
18. (Russia) Ekaterina Makarova (second round)
19. (United States) Venus Williams (third round, withdrew because of a lower back injury)
20. (Spain) Carla Suárez Navarro (third round)
21. (Czech Republic) Klára Zakopalová (fourth round)
22. (Serbia) Jelena Janković (semifinals)
23. (Russia) Anastasia Pavlyuchenkova (second round)
24. (Germany) Julia Görges (second round)
25. (United States) Varvara Lepchenko (third round)
26. (Austria) Tamira Paszek (second round)
27. (Germany) Mona Barthel (second round)
28. (Romania) Sorana Cîrstea (fourth round)
29. (Russia) Elena Vesnina (third round)
30. (Belgium) Kirsten Flipkens (quarterfinals)
31. (Belgium) Yanina Wickmayer (second round)
32. (France) Alizé Cornet (fourth round)

== Draw ==
=== Key ===
- Q = Qualifier
- WC = Wild card
- LL = Lucky loser
- Alt = Alternate
- SE = Special exempt
- PR = Protected ranking
- ITF = ITF entry
- JE = Junior exempt
- w/o = Walkover
- r = Retired
- d = Defaulted
- SR = Special ranking

=== Finals ===
Quarterfinals
1	(United States) Serena Williams	6	7^{7}
5	(China) Li Na	3	6^{5}
4	(Poland) Agnieszka Radwańska	4	6	6
30	(Belgium) Kirsten Flipkens	6	4	2
8	(Italy) Sara Errani	5	5
3	(Russia) Maria Sharapova	7	7
22	(Serbia) Jelena Janković	6	6^{6}	6
15	(Italy) Roberta Vinci	4	7^{8}	3

Semifinals
1	(United States) Serena Williams	6	6
4	(Poland) Agnieszka Radwańska	0	3
3	(Russia) Maria Sharapova	6	6
22	(Serbia) Jelena Janković	2	1

Final
1	(United States) Serena Williams	4	6	6
3	(Russia) Maria Sharapova	6	3	0

=== Top half ===
==== Section 1 ====
First round
(Italy) F Pennetta	6	6
(Sweden) J Larsson	4	1
(United Kingdom) H Watson	6	5	4
(Japan) A Morita	1	7	6
(Switzerland) R Oprandi	6	3	6
(Netherlands) A Rus	4	6	3
(France) K Mladenovic	7	6
(Canada) A Wozniak	5	2

Second round
1	(United States) S Williams	6	6
(Italy) F Pennetta	1	1
(Japan) A Morita	7^{7}	2	6
31	(Belgium) Y Wickmayer	6^{2}	6	3
17	(Czech Republic) L Šafářová	6^{4}	6	6^{5}
(Switzerland) R Oprandi	7^{7}	4	7^{7}
(France) K Mladenovic	2	3
13	(Slovakia) D Cibulková	6	6

Third round
1	(United States) S Williams	6	6
(Japan) A Morita	3	3
(Switzerland) R Oprandi	3	4
13	(Slovakia) D Cibulková	6	6

Fourth round
1	(United States) S Williams	2	6	6
13	(Slovakia) D Cibulková	6	4	2

==== Section 2 ====
First round
(Czech Republic) L Hradecká	2	1
Q	(Czech Republic) Ka Plíšková	6	6
Q	(Czech Republic) K Siniaková	2	6	4
WC	(Spain) G Muguruza	6	3	6
(New Zealand) M Erakovic	1	6	4
(Romania) I-C Begu	6	4	6
(Georgia (country)) A Tatishvili	0	0^{r}
(Netherlands) K Bertens	6	1

Second round
9	(Denmark) C Wozniacki	5	6	6
Q	(Czech Republic) Ka Plíšková	7	3	3
WC	(Spain) G Muguruza	4	6	6
23	(Russia) A Pavlyuchenkova	6	2	2
25	(United States) V Lepchenko	6	6
(Romania) I-C Begu	3	4
(Netherlands) K Bertens	3	1
5	(China) N Li	6	6

Third round
9	(Denmark) C Wozniacki	2	4
WC	(Spain) G Muguruza	6	6
25	(United States) V Lepchenko	2	4
5	(China) N Li	6	6

Fourth round
WC	(Spain) G Muguruza	6^{6}	2
5	(China) N Li	7^{8}	6

==== Section 3 ====
First round
(Chinese Taipei) S-w Hsieh	6	7^{17}
(Ukraine) L Tsurenko	4	6^{15}
(Slovakia) M Rybáriková	6	6
Q	(United States) M Burdette	2	4
(Japan) K Date-Krumm	6	6
(South Africa) C Scheepers	2	0
(Belarus) O Govortsova	3	6	6
Q	(Hungary) M Czink	6	3	2

Second round
4	(Poland) A Radwańska	6	6
(Chinese Taipei) S-w Hsieh	3	2
(Slovakia) M Rybáriková	6	7^{7}
27	(Germany) M Barthel	3	6^{5}
19	(United States) V Williams	7^{7}	3	6
(Japan) K Date-Krumm	6^{3}	6	4
(Belarus) O Govortsova	6	4	4
16	(United States) S Stephens	0	6	6

Third round
4	(Poland) A Radwańska	7^{7}	2	6
(Slovakia) M Rybáriková	6^{5}	6	3
19	(United States) V Williams
16	(United States) S Stephens	w/o

Fourth round
4	(Poland) A Radwańska	4	6	6
16	(United States) S Stephens	6	2	0

==== Section 4 ====
First round
(Serbia) B Jovanovski	3	1
WC	(Germany) A Petkovic	6	6
(Kazakhstan) K Pervak	2	2
WC	(Croatia) A Tomljanović	6	6
Q	(Switzerland) S Vögele	6	6
(Croatia) P Martić	3	3
(Sweden) S Arvidsson	3	2
(China) S Peng	6	6

Second round
10	(France) M Bartoli	3	1^{r}
WC	(Germany) A Petkovic	6	4
WC	(Croatia) A Tomljanović	7^{7}	6
24	(Germany) J Görges	6^{4}	2
30	(Belgium) K Flipkens	6	6
Q	(Switzerland) S Vögele	4	2
(China) S Peng	7	2	2
7	(Czech Republic) P Kvitová	5	6	6

Third round
WC	(Germany) A Petkovic	6	4	6^{1}
WC	(Croatia) A Tomljanović	0	6	7^{7}
30	(Belgium) K Flipkens	6	4	6
7	(Czech Republic) P Kvitová	0	6	1

Fourth round
WC	(Croatia) A Tomljanović	7^{8}	4	3
30	(Belgium) K Flipkens	6^{6}	6	6

=== Bottom half ===
==== Section 5 ====
First round
(Bulgaria) T Pironkova	2	4
(Slovakia) D Hantuchová	6	6
(Romania) S Halep	6	3	7
(Germany) S Lisicki	2	6	5
(Spain) L Domínguez Lino	3	3
(Russia) S Kuznetsova	6	6
(Germany) A Beck	3	1
(Poland) U Radwańska	6	6

Second round
8	(Italy) S Errani	6	6
(Slovakia) D Hantuchová	3	1
(Romania) S Halep	6	6^{4}	7
26	(Austria) T Paszek	1	7^{7}	5
18	(Russia) E Makarova	4	4
(Russia) S Kuznetsova	6	6
(Poland) U Radwańska	2	1
12	(Serbia) A Ivanovic	6	6

Third round
8	(Italy) S Errani	6	6
(Romania) S Halep	1	0
(Russia) S Kuznetsova	3	3
12	(Serbia) A Ivanovic	6	6

Fourth round
8	(Italy) S Errani	1	6	6
12	(Serbia) A Ivanovic	6	4	2

==== Section 6 ====
First round
WC	(Puerto Rico) M Puig	4	5
Q	(United States) B Mattek-Sands	6	7
(Spain) A Medina Garrigues	5	6	7^{7}
PR	(Romania) A Dulgheru	7	4	6^{3}
Q	(Kazakhstan) Y Putintseva	6^{4}	0
Q	(Croatia) D Vekić	7^{7}	6
WC	(Canada) E Bouchard	4	6	6
Q	(Israel) S Pe'er	6	1	4

Second round
14	(Russia) M Kirilenko	6	6
Q	(United States) B Mattek-Sands	1	4
(Spain) A Medina Garrigues	3	6^{3}
21	(Czech Republic) K Zakopalová	6	7^{7}
29	(Russia) E Vesnina	6	6
Q	(Croatia) D Vekić	4	2
WC	(Canada) E Bouchard	2	0
3	(Russia) M Sharapova	6	6

Third round
14	(Russia) M Kirilenko	2	6^{4}
21	(Czech Republic) K Zakopalová	6	7^{7}
29	(Russia) E Vesnina	4	2
3	(Russia) M Sharapova	6	6

Fourth round
21	(Czech Republic) K Zakopalová	2	2
3	(Russia) M Sharapova	6	6

==== Section 7 ====
First round
(Italy) F Schiavone	5	6	6
Q	(Slovakia) J Čepelová	7	4	4
(France) P Parmentier	0	7^{7}	2
Q	(Spain) S Soler Espinosa	6	6^{2}	6
WC	(United States) V Duval	7^{7}	6
(Czech Republic) A Hlaváčková	6^{4}	4
(China) J Zheng	7	6
(Kazakhstan) Y Shvedova	5	4

Second round
6	(Germany) A Kerber	6^{5}	6	6
(Italy) F Schiavone	7^{7}	3	2
Q	(Spain) S Soler Espinosa	6	5	2
28	(Romania) S Cîrstea	2	7	6
22	(Serbia) J Janković	6	7
WC	(United States) V Duval	3	5
(China) J Zheng	3	1
11	(Russia) N Petrova	6	6

Third round
6	(Germany) A Kerber	4	0
28	(Romania) S Cîrstea	6	6
22	(Serbia) J Janković	7^{9}	6
11	(Russia) N Petrova	6^{7}	4

Fourth round
28	(Romania) S Cîrstea	0	4
22	(Serbia) J Janković	6	6

==== Section 8 ====
First round
WC	(Estonia) A Kontaveit	2	1
(United States) C McHale	6	6
(United States) J Hampton	6	6
(Romania) M Niculescu	4	3
(United Kingdom) L Robson	6	4	6
(Italy) C Giorgi	2	6	3
WC	(United States) M Keys	6	6
Q	(United States) A Kiick	0	0

Second round
15	(Italy) R Vinci	6^{2}	6	6
(United States) C McHale	7^{7}	1	3
(United States) J Hampton	7	5	6^{3}
20	(Spain) C Suárez Navarro	5	7	7^{7}
32	(France) A Cornet	5	7	6
(United Kingdom) L Robson	7	5	1
WC	(United States) M Keys	1	7	6^{7}
LL	(United States) L Davis	6	5	7^{9}

Third round
15	(Italy) R Vinci	5	6	6
20	(Spain) C Suárez Navarro	7	4	4
32	(France) A Cornet	2	6	6
LL	(United States) L Davis	6	3	2

Fourth round
15	(Italy) R Vinci	2	6	6
32	(France) A Cornet	6	4	4

== Qualifying ==
=== Seeds ===
1. (Spain) Sílvia Soler Espinosa (qualified)
2. (Switzerland) Stefanie Vögele (qualified)
3. (United States) Lauren Davis (qualifying competition, lucky loser)
4. (Russia) Olga Puchkova (first round)
5. (Italy) Camila Giorgi (moved to main draw)
6. (Japan) Misaki Doi (first round)
7. (Czech Republic) Karolína Plíšková (qualified)
8. (United States) Melanie Oudin (first round)
9. (Spain) María Teresa Torró Flor (first round)
10. (Spain) Lara Arruabarrena (first round)
11. (Ukraine) Elina Svitolina (qualifying competition)
12. (Slovakia) Jana Čepelová (qualified)
13. (Kazakhstan) Yulia Putintseva (qualified)
14. (Luxembourg) Mandy Minella (first round)
15. (Hungary) Melinda Czink (qualified)
16. (Croatia) Donna Vekić (qualified)
17. (United States) CoCo Vandeweghe (qualifying competition)
18. (Serbia) Vesna Dolonc (first round)
19. (Germany) Tatjana Malek (qualifying competition)
20. (Portugal) Maria João Koehler (first round)
21. (Kazakhstan) Galina Voskoboeva (qualifying competition)
22. (Czech Republic) Kristýna Plíšková (qualifying competition)
23. (Australia) Anastasia Rodionova (first round)
24. (Croatia) Mirjana Lučić-Baroni (first round)
25. (Russia) Nina Bratchikova (qualifying competition)

=== Qualifiers ===
1. (Spain) Sílvia Soler Espinosa
2. (Switzerland) Stefanie Vögele
3. (United States) Mallory Burdette
4. (Israel) Shahar Pe'er
5. (Kazakhstan) Yulia Putintseva
6. (United States) Bethanie Mattek-Sands
7. (Czech Republic) Karolína Plíšková
8. (Czech Republic) Kateřina Siniaková
9. (Croatia) Donna Vekić
10. (United States) Allie Kiick
11. (Hungary) Melinda Czink
12. (Slovakia) Jana Čepelová

=== Lucky losers ===
1. (United States) Lauren Davis

=== Key ===
- Q = Qualifier
- WC = Wild card
- LL = Lucky loser
- Alt = Alternate
- SE = Special exempt
- PR = Protected ranking
- ITF = ITF entry
- JE = Junior exempt
- w/o = Walkover
- r = Retired
- d = Defaulted
- SR = Special ranking

==== First qualifier ====
First round
1	(Spain) Sílvia Soler Espinosa	6	7^{8}
(Spain) Estrella Cabeza Candela	4	6^{6}
(Kazakhstan) Sesil Karatantcheva	6	5	7^{7}
23	(Australia) Anastasia Rodionova	1	7	6^{3}

Qualifying competition
1	(Spain) Sílvia Soler Espinosa	6	6
(Kazakhstan) Sesil Karatantcheva	4	2

==== Second qualifier ====
First round
2	(Switzerland) Stefanie Vögele	6	6
(Romania) Alexandra Cadanțu	3	3
(Greece) Eleni Daniilidou	1	2
21	(Kazakhstan) Galina Voskoboeva	6	6

Qualifying competition
2	(Switzerland) Stefanie Vögele	6	6
21	(Kazakhstan) Galina Voskoboeva	2	2

==== Third qualifier ====
First round
3	(United States) Lauren Davis	1	6	6
(Australia) Casey Dellacqua	6	4	1
(United States) Mallory Burdette	7^{7}	6
18	(Serbia) Vesna Dolonc	6^{4}	4

Qualifying competition
3	(United States) Lauren Davis	7^{7}	4	4
(United States) Mallory Burdette	6^{0}	6	6

==== Fourth qualifier ====
First round
4	(Russia) Olga Puchkova	2	6	4
(Israel) Shahar Pe'er	6	3	6
(France) Stéphanie Foretz Gacon	0	2
19	(Germany) Tatjana Malek	6	6

Qualifying competition
(Israel) Shahar Pe'er	6	6
19	(Germany) Tatjana Malek	4	0

==== Fifth qualifier ====
First round
13	(Kazakhstan) Yulia Putintseva	6^{2}	6	0
WC	(Russia) Irina Khromacheva	7^{7}	2	0^{r}
Alt	(Argentina) Paula Ormaechea	3	6^{5}
25	(Russia) Nina Bratchikova	6	7^{7}

Qualifying competition
13	(Kazakhstan) Yulia Putintseva	6	4	6
25	(Russia) Nina Bratchikova	2	6	2

==== Sixth qualifier ====
First round
6	(Japan) Misaki Doi	4	6	6^{5}
WC	(United States) Bethanie Mattek-Sands	6	4	7^{7}
(China) Zhang Shuai	6	6
24	(Croatia) Mirjana Lučić-Baroni	2	1

Qualifying competition
WC	(United States) Bethanie Mattek-Sands	6	6
(China) Zhang Shuai	2	3

==== Seventh qualifier ====
First round
7	(Czech Republic) Karolína Plíšková	7^{7}	6
WC	(Australia) Jarmila Gajdošová	6^{3}	1
WC	(Switzerland) Belinda Bencic	3	6^{5}
17	(United States) CoCo Vandeweghe	6	7^{7}

Qualifying competition
7	(Czech Republic) Karolína Plíšková	6	6
17	(United States) CoCo Vandeweghe	2	3

==== Eighth qualifier ====
First round
8	(United States) Melanie Oudin	4	2
(United States) Alexa Glatch	6	6
WC	(Czech Republic) Kateřina Siniaková	7	5	6
14	(Luxembourg) Mandy Minella	5	7	3

Qualifying competition
(United States) Alexa Glatch	4	3
WC	(Czech Republic) Kateřina Siniaková	6	6

==== Ninth qualifier ====
First round
9	(Spain) María Teresa Torró Flor	3	2
(Russia) Valeria Savinykh	6	6
(Russia) Marta Sirotkina	2	3
16	(Croatia) Donna Vekić	6	6

Qualifying competition
(Russia) Valeria Savinykh	6	3	4
16	(Croatia) Donna Vekić	4	6	6

==== Tenth qualifier ====
First round
10	(Spain) Lara Arruabarrena	4	5
WC	(United States) Allie Kiick	6	7
(United States) Vania King	7	6
20	(Portugal) Maria João Koehler	5	3

Qualifying competition
WC	(United States) Allie Kiick	6	0	6
(United States) Vania King	4	6	3

==== Eleventh qualifier ====
First round
11	(Ukraine) Elina Svitolina	6	6
(United States) Maria Sanchez	3	3
(United States) Julia Cohen	4	1
15	(Hungary) Melinda Czink	6	6

Qualifying competition
11	(Ukraine) Elina Svitolina	6^{5}	4
15	(Hungary) Melinda Czink	7^{7}	6

==== Twelfth qualifier ====
First round
12	(Slovakia) Jana Čepelová	7	6
(Latvia) Anastasija Sevastova	5	1
(Brazil) Teliana Pereira	5	0
22	(Czech Republic) Kristýna Plíšková	7	6

Qualifying competition
12	(Slovakia) Jana Čepelová	1	6	7
22	(Czech Republic) Kristýna Plíšková	6	2	5
