= 2013 Sony Open Tennis – Men's singles =

Men's singles
- 2013 Sony Open Tennis

Final
- Champion: (United Kingdom) Andy Murray
- Runner-up: (Spain) David Ferrer
- Score: 2–6, 6–4, 7–6^{(7–1)}

Details
- Draw: 96 (12Q / 4WC)
- Seeds: 32

Events
Singles	men	women
Doubles	men	women
- Miami Masters

Andy Murray defeated David Ferrer in the final, 2–6, 6–4, 7–6^{(7–1)} to win the men's singles tennis title at the 2013 Miami Open. He saved a championship point en route to his second Miami Open title.

Novak Djokovic was the two-time defending champion, but lost in the fourth round to Tommy Haas. Between 2011 and 2016, this was the only edition of the tournament that Djokovic did not win.

This was the first edition of the tournament not to feature an American in the quarterfinals, and also the first all-European quarterfinal lineup at the tournament.

== Seeds ==
All seeds receive a bye into the second round.

1. (Serbia) Novak Djokovic (fourth round)
2. (United Kingdom) Andy Murray (champion)
3. (Spain) David Ferrer (final)
4. (Czech Republic) Tomáš Berdych (quarterfinals)
5. (Argentina) Juan Martín del Potro (second round)
6. (France) Jo-Wilfried Tsonga (fourth round)
7. (Serbia) Janko Tipsarević (fourth round)
8. (France) Richard Gasquet (semifinals)
9. (Croatia) Marin Čilić (quarterfinals)
10. (Spain) Nicolás Almagro (fourth round)
11. (France) Gilles Simon (quarterfinals)
12. (Argentina) Juan Mónaco (second round)
13. (Japan) Kei Nishikori (fourth round)
14. (Canada) Milos Raonic (third round, withdrew because of strep throat)
15. (Germany) Tommy Haas (semifinals)
16. (Italy) Andreas Seppi (fourth round)
17. (United States) Sam Querrey (fourth round)
18. (Germany) Philipp Kohlschreiber (second round)
19. (Ukraine) Alexandr Dolgopolov (third round)
20. (United States) John Isner (third round)
21. (Poland) Jerzy Janowicz (second round)
22. (France) Jérémy Chardy (second round)
23. (Germany) Florian Mayer (second round)
24. (France) Julien Benneteau (second round)
25. (Spain) Fernando Verdasco (second round)
26. (South Africa) Kevin Anderson (third round)
27. (Slovakia) Martin Kližan (second round)
28. (Russia) Mikhail Youzhny (third round)
29. (Bulgaria) Grigor Dimitrov (third round)
30. (Spain) ~~Feliciano López~~ (withdrew because of a wrist injury)
31. (Spain) Marcel Granollers (second round)
32. (Italy) Fabio Fognini (third round)

== Draw ==
Key

- Q = Qualifier
- WC = Wild card
- LL = Lucky loser
- Alt = Alternate
- ITF = ITF entry
- PR = Protected ranking
- SR = Special ranking
- SE = Special exempt
- JE = Junior exempt
- JR = Junior Accelerator Programme entrant
- CO = College Accelerator Programme entrant
- NG = Next Gen Accelerator Program entrant
- w/o = Walkover
- r = Retired
- d = Defaulted

=== Finals ===
Quarterfinals
15	(Germany) Tommy Haas	6	6
11	(France) Gilles Simon	3	1
3	(Spain) David Ferrer	4	6	6
(Austria) Jürgen Melzer	6	3	0
8	(France) Richard Gasquet	6	6
4	(Czech Republic) Tomáš Berdych	3	3
9	(Croatia) Marin Čilić	4	3
2	(United Kingdom) Andy Murray	6	6

Semifinals
15	(Germany) Tommy Haas	6	2	3
3	(Spain) David Ferrer	4	6	6
8	(France) Richard Gasquet	7^{7}	1	2
2	(United Kingdom) Andy Murray	6^{3}	6	6

Final
3	(Spain) David Ferrer	6	4	6^{1}
2	(United Kingdom) Andy Murray	2	6	7^{7}

=== Top half ===
==== Section 1 ====
First round
(Luxembourg) G Müller	5	4
(Czech Republic) L Rosol	7	6
(Russia) E Donskoy	6	6^{5}	2
PR	(India) S Devvarman	4	7^{7}	6
(Russia) N Davydenko	6	2	6
(Italy) P Lorenzi	0	6	0
(Netherlands) I Sijsling	3
(Argentina) L Mayer	2^{r}

Second round
1	(Serbia) N Djokovic	6	6
(Czech Republic) L Rosol	1	0
PR	(India) S Devvarman	4	6	7
LL	(France) É Roger-Vasselin	6	4	5
19	(Ukraine) A Dolgopolov	6	6
(Russia) N Davydenko	2	3
(Netherlands) I Sijsling	0	7	3
15	(Germany) T Haas	6	5	6

Third round
1	(Serbia) N Djokovic	6	6
PR	(India) S Devvarman	2	4
19	(Ukraine) A Dolgopolov	3	2
15	(Germany) T Haas	6	6

Fourth round
1	(Serbia) N Djokovic	2	4
15	(Germany) T Haas	6	6

==== Section 2 ====
First round
(Portugal) J Sousa	1	6^{3}
WC	(Australia) L Hewitt	6	7^{7}
(Slovenia) G Žemlja	3	0
(Spain) R Bautista Agut	6	0^{r}
Q	(Netherlands) T de Bakker	1	6	3
(Argentina) H Zeballos	6	3	6
(Australia) M Matosevic	2	6	4
Q	(Israel) D Sela	6	1	6

Second round
11	(France) G Simon	6	6
WC	(Australia) L Hewitt	3	3
(Slovenia) G Žemlja	6	7^{7}
23	(Germany) F Mayer	3	6^{3}
26	(South Africa) K Anderson	6	7^{7}
(Argentina) H Zeballos	3	6^{4}
Q	(Israel) D Sela	2	4
7	(Serbia) J Tipsarević	6	6

Third round
11	(France) G Simon	6	6
(Slovenia) G Žemlja	4	4
26	(South Africa) K Anderson	6	6^{5}	0
7	(Serbia) J Tipsarević	4	7^{7}	6

Fourth round
11	(France) G Simon	5	6	6
7	(Serbia) J Tipsarević	7	2	2

==== Section 3 ====
First round
Q	(Russia) D Tursunov	7^{7}	7
Q	(United States) T Smyczek	6^{4}	5
(France) B Paire	6^{7}	2
(France) M Llodra	7^{9}	6
Q	(United States) R Ram	4	7^{8}	4
(Belgium) X Malisse	6	6^{6}	6
(Russia) A Kuznetsov	6	3	1^{r}
(Romania) V Hănescu	4	6	4

Second round
3	(Spain) D Ferrer	w/o
Q	(Russia) D Tursunov
(France) M Llodra	4	1
32	(Italy) F Fognini	6	6
22	(France) J Chardy	3	2
(Belgium) X Malisse	6	6
(Romania) V Hănescu	3	3
13	(Japan) K Nishikori	6	6

Third round
3	(Spain) D Ferrer	6	7
32	(Italy) F Fognini	1	5
(Belgium) X Malisse	2	5
13	(Japan) K Nishikori	6	7

Fourth round
3	(Spain) D Ferrer	6	6
13	(Japan) K Nishikori	4	2

==== Section 4 ====
First round
Q	(Czech Republic) J Hájek	3	1
(Spain) A Ramos	6	6
(United States) R Harrison	2	2
WC	(United States) J Blake	6	6
(Austria) J Melzer	3	6	7^{7}
(Lithuania) R Berankis	6	3	6^{1}
(Germany) T Kamke	7^{7}	6
(Slovenia) B Kavčič	6^{5}	3

Second round
12	(Argentina) J Mónaco	2	6	3
(Spain) A Ramos	6	4	6
WC	(United States) J Blake	6	6
24	(France) J Benneteau	2	3
31	(Spain) M Granollers	3	4
(Austria) J Melzer	6	6
(Germany) T Kamke	7^{7}	6
5	(Argentina) JM del Potro	6^{5}	1

Third round
(Spain) A Ramos	6	2	7
WC	(United States) J Blake	4	6	5
(Austria) J Melzer	6^{3}	6	6
(Germany) T Kamke	7^{7}	3	4

Fourth round
(Spain) A Ramos	6	3	3
(Austria) J Melzer	2	6	6

=== Bottom half ===
==== Section 5 ====
First round
(Japan) T Ito	6	4	1^{r}
Q	(Belgium) O Rochus	4	6	3
Q	(United States) R Ginepri	5	1
(Chinese Taipei) Y-h Lu	7	6
(Belgium) D Goffin	7^{7}	3	6
(Netherlands) R Haase	6^{4}	6	1
WC	(Argentina) G Pella	2
(Argentina) C Berlocq	1^{r}

Second round
8	(France) R Gasquet	7	6
Q	(Belgium) O Rochus	5	2
(Chinese Taipei) Y-h Lu	3	6	0
28	(Russia) M Youzhny	6	1	6
18	(Germany) P Kohlschreiber	6^{5}	6	2
(Belgium) D Goffin	7^{7}	4	6
WC	(Argentina) G Pella	0	3
10	(Spain) N Almagro	6	6

Third round
8	(France) R Gasquet	6	6
28	(Russia) M Youzhny	3	4
(Belgium) D Goffin	3	4
10	(Spain) N Almagro	6	6

Fourth round
8	(France) R Gasquet	6^{3}	7	7^{7}
10	(Spain) N Almagro	7^{7}	5	6^{3}

==== Section 6 ====
First round
Q	(Romania) M Copil	4	6	1
Q	(France) G Rufin	6	4	6
Q	(Canada) F Dancevic	6	4	3
(Poland) Ł Kubot	4	6	6
(Japan) G Soeda	5	1
(Colombia) A Falla	7	6
(Spain) D Gimeno Traver	6	6
(Uzbekistan) D Istomin	2	4

Second round
14	(Canada) M Raonic	6	6
Q	(France) G Rufin	2	4
(Poland) Ł Kubot	6	3	3
17	(United States) S Querrey	4	6	6
25	(Spain) F Verdasco	3	6^{6}
(Colombia) A Falla	6	7^{8}
(Spain) D Gimeno Traver	7	6^{3}	2
4	(Czech Republic) T Berdych	5	7^{7}	6

Third round
14	(Canada) M Raonic
17	(United States) S Querrey	w/o
(Colombia) A Falla	6	6^{6}	4
4	(Czech Republic) T Berdych	2	7^{8}	6

Fourth round
17	(United States) S Querrey	1	1
4	(Czech Republic) T Berdych	6	6

==== Section 7 ====
First round
(Spain) P Andújar	2	3
(Serbia) V Troicki	6	6
(Finland) J Nieminen	2	6	6
(Argentina) D Nalbandian	6	4	3
(Croatia) I Dodig	4	6	6
(Slovakia) L Lacko	6	0	4
WC	(United States) R Williams	2	4
(Colombia) S Giraldo	6	6

Second round
6	(France) J-W Tsonga	7^{8}	6
(Serbia) V Troicki	6^{6}	3
(Finland) J Nieminen	6	6
27	(Slovakia) M Kližan	2	2
20	(United States) J Isner	4	7	7^{7}
(Croatia) I Dodig	6	5	6^{5}
(Colombia) S Giraldo	2	6^{6}
9	(Croatia) M Čilić	6	7^{8}

Third round
6	(France) J-W Tsonga	6	6
(Finland) J Nieminen	3	3
20	(United States) J Isner	3	6^{3}
9	(Croatia) M Čilić	6	7^{7}

Fourth round
6	(France) J-W Tsonga	5	6^{4}
9	(Croatia) M Čilić	7	7^{7}

==== Section 8 ====
First round
(Germany) B Becker	4	3
(Slovenia) A Bedene	6	6
(Brazil) T Bellucci	2	6	6
LL	(Germany) D Brands	6	4	2
(Canada) J Levine	6	3	6^{4}
(Italy) S Bolelli	4	6	7^{7}
Q	(France) M Gicquel	5	6^{3}
(Australia) B Tomic	7	7^{7}

Second round
16	(Italy) A Seppi	7	5	7
(Slovenia) A Bedene	5	7	5
(Brazil) T Bellucci	7^{7}	3	6
21	(Poland) J Janowicz	6^{5}	6	3
29	(Bulgaria) G Dimitrov	6	1
(Italy) S Bolelli	4	1^{r}
(Australia) B Tomic	3	1
2	(United Kingdom) A Murray	6	6

Third round
16	(Italy) A Seppi	7	4	6
(Brazil) T Bellucci	5	6	2
29	(Bulgaria) G Dimitrov	6^{3}	3
2	(United Kingdom) A Murray	7^{7}	6

Fourth round
16	(Italy) A Seppi	2	4
2	(United Kingdom) A Murray	6	6

== Qualifying ==
=== Seeds ===
1. (United States) Michael Russell (first round)
2. (Germany) Daniel Brands (qualifying competition, lucky loser)
3. (Russia) Dmitry Tursunov (qualified)
4. (France) Édouard Roger-Vasselin (qualifying competition, lucky loser)
5. (France) Guillaume Rufin (qualified)
6. (Argentina) Martín Alund (first round)
7. (Czech Republic) Jan Hájek (qualified)
8. (United States) Rajeev Ram (qualified)
9. (France) Kenny de Schepper (first round)
10. (United States) Tim Smyczek (qualified)
11. (Belgium) Steve Darcis (first round)
12. (Ukraine) Sergiy Stakhovsky (first round)
13. (Germany) Matthias Bachinger (qualifying competition)
14. (Romania) Adrian Ungur (first round)
15. (Netherlands) Thiemo de Bakker (qualified)
16. (Australia) Matthew Ebden (first round)
17. (Brazil) Rogério Dutra da Silva (qualifying competition)
18. (Austria) Andreas Haider-Maurer (qualifying competition)
19. (Germany) Jan-Lennard Struff (qualifying competition)
20. (Germany) Philipp Petzschner (first round)
21. (France) Marc Gicquel (qualified)
22. (Germany) Björn Phau (qualifying competition)
23. (Israel) Dudi Sela (qualified)
24. (Italy) Matteo Viola (qualifying competition)

=== Qualifiers ===
1. (Israel) Dudi Sela
2. (France) Marc Gicquel
3. (Russia) Dmitry Tursunov
4. (Netherlands) Thiemo de Bakker
5. (France) Guillaume Rufin
6. (Belgium) Olivier Rochus
7. (Czech Republic) Jan Hájek
8. (United States) Rajeev Ram
9. (Canada) Frank Dancevic
10. (United States) Tim Smyczek
11. (Romania) Marius Copil
12. (United States) Robby Ginepri

=== Lucky losers ===
1. (Germany) Daniel Brands
2. (France) Édouard Roger-Vasselin

=== Draw ===
Key

- Q = Qualifier
- WC = Wild card
- LL = Lucky loser
- Alt = Alternate
- ITF = ITF entry
- PR = Protected ranking
- SR = Special ranking
- SE = Special exempt
- JE = Junior exempt
- JR = Junior Accelerator Programme entrant
- CO = College Accelerator Programme entrant
- NG = Next Gen Accelerator Program entrant
- w/o = Walkover
- r = Retired
- d = Defaulted

==== First qualifier ====
First round
1	(United States) Michael Russell	3	4
(Brazil) João Souza	6	6
WC	(United States) Ryan Sweeting	4	4
23	(Israel) Dudi Sela	6	6

Qualifying competition
(Brazil) João Souza	7	3	0
23	(Israel) Dudi Sela	5	6	6

==== Second qualifier ====
First round
2	(Germany) Daniel Brands	6	6
WC	(United States) Deiton Baughman	2	4
(Ukraine) Ivan Sergeyev	7^{7}	1	4
21	(France) Marc Gicquel	6^{3}	6	6

Qualifying competition
2	(Germany) Daniel Brands	6^{3}	3
21	(France) Marc Gicquel	7^{7}	6

==== Third qualifier ====
First round
3	(Russia) Dmitry Tursunov	6^{2}	6	6
(France) Florent Serra	7^{7}	3	2
(Croatia) Antonio Veić	3	2
22	(Germany) Björn Phau	6	6

Qualifying competition
3	(Russia) Dmitry Tursunov	1	6	6
22	(Germany) Björn Phau	6	4	4

==== Fourth qualifier ====
First round
4	(France) Édouard Roger-Vasselin	6	7
WC	(India) Yuki Bhambri	4	5
WC	(Japan) Yoshihito Nishioka	0	0
15	(Netherlands) Thiemo de Bakker	6	6

Qualifying competition
4	(France) Édouard Roger-Vasselin	3	4
15	(Netherlands) Thiemo de Bakker	6	6

==== Fifth qualifier ====
First round
5	(France) Guillaume Rufin	4	6	7
(Belarus) Uladzimir Ignatik	6	3	5
(Brazil) Thiago Alves	3	0
24	(Italy) Matteo Viola	6	6

Qualifying competition
5	(France) Guillaume Rufin	4	7^{7}	6
24	(Italy) Matteo Viola	6	6^{5}	4

==== Sixth qualifier ====
First round
6	(Argentina) Martín Alund	3	6	3
(Chile) Paul Capdeville	6	3	6
(Belgium) Olivier Rochus	6	6
20	(Germany) Philipp Petzschner	3	4

Qualifying competition
(Chile) Paul Capdeville	6^{4}	3
(Belgium) Olivier Rochus	7^{7}	6

==== Seventh qualifier ====
First round
7	(Czech Republic) Jan Hájek	6	6
(Germany) Mischa Zverev	1	3
(United States) Steve Johnson	6	7^{7}
16	(Australia) Matthew Ebden	4	6^{5}

Qualifying competition
7	(Czech Republic) Jan Hájek	1	6	6
(United States) Steve Johnson	6	4	4

==== Eighth qualifier ====
First round
8	(United States) Rajeev Ram	6	6
(Argentina) Diego Sebastián Schwartzman	4	4
(Germany) Michael Berrer	6	4	1
18	(Austria) Andreas Haider-Maurer	4	6	6

Qualifying competition
8	(United States) Rajeev Ram	6	6
18	(Austria) Andreas Haider-Maurer	1	3

==== Ninth qualifier ====
First round
9	(France) Kenny de Schepper	4	6^{4}
(Canada) Frank Dancevic	6	7^{7}
(Ukraine) Illya Marchenko	4	6	6^{1}
17	(Brazil) Rogério Dutra da Silva	6	3	7^{7}

Qualifying competition
(Canada) Frank Dancevic	6^{2}	6	6
17	(Brazil) Rogério Dutra da Silva	7^{7}	3	3

==== Tenth qualifier ====
First round
10	(United States) Tim Smyczek	6	6
(Portugal) Gastão Elias	0	4
(United States) Wayne Odesnik	6^{0}	2
13	(Germany) Matthias Bachinger	7^{7}	6

Qualifying competition
10	(United States) Tim Smyczek	5	6	6
13	(Germany) Matthias Bachinger	7	3	1

==== Eleventh qualifier ====
First round
11	(Belgium) Steve Darcis	2	3
(Romania) Marius Copil	6	6
(Croatia) Ivo Karlović	3	3
19	(Germany) Jan-Lennard Struff	6	6

Qualifying competition
(Romania) Marius Copil	7	6
19	(Germany) Jan-Lennard Struff	5	4

==== Twelfth qualifier ====
First round
12	(Ukraine) Sergiy Stakhovsky	6	6^{3}	2
(United States) Jack Sock	4	7^{7}	6
WC	(United States) Robby Ginepri	7^{7}	6
14	(Romania) Adrian Ungur	6^{2}	2

Qualifying competition
(United States) Jack Sock	4	4
WC	(United States) Robby Ginepri	6	6
