= 2013 Italian Open – Women's doubles =

Women's doubles
- 2013 Italian Open

Final
- Champions: (Chinese Taipei) Hsieh Su-wei (China) Peng Shuai
- Runners-up: (Italy) Sara Errani (Italy) Roberta Vinci
- Score: 4–6, 6–3, [10–8]

Details
- Draw: 28
- Seeds: 8

Events
Singles	men	women
Doubles	men	women
← 2012 ·	Italian Open	· 2014 →

Sara Errani and Roberta Vinci were the defending champions. They reached the final this year, but lost to unseeded pair Peng Shuai and Hsieh Su-wei 4–6, 6–3, [10–8].

== Seeds ==
The top four seeds receive a bye into the second round.

1. (Italy) Sara Errani / (Italy) Roberta Vinci (final)
2. (Russia) Nadia Petrova / (Slovenia) Katarina Srebotnik (semifinals)
3. (Russia) Ekaterina Makarova / (Russia) Elena Vesnina (withdrew because of Makarova's left achilles injury)
4. (United States) Liezel Huber / (Spain) María José Martínez Sánchez (second round)
5. (United States) Raquel Kops-Jones / (United States) Abigail Spears (first round)
6. (United States) Bethanie Mattek-Sands / (India) Sania Mirza (quarterfinals)
7. (Germany) Anna-Lena Grönefeld / (Czech Republic) Květa Peschke (second round)
8. (China) Zhang Shuai / (China) Zheng Jie (first round)

== Draw ==
=== Key ===
- Q = Qualifier
- WC = Wild card
- LL = Lucky loser
- Alt = Alternate
- ITF = ITF entry
- PR = Protected ranking
- SR = Special ranking
- SE = Special exempt
- JE = Junior exempt
- JR = Junior Accelerator Programme entrant
- CO = College Accelerator Programme entrant
- NG = Next Gen Accelerator Program entrant
- w/o = Walkover
- r = Retired
- d = Defaulted

=== Finals ===
Semifinals
1	(Italy) Sara Errani (Italy) Roberta Vinci	6	6
(Russia) Alla Kudryavtseva (Australia) Anastasia Rodionova	2	1
(Chinese Taipei) Hsieh Su-wei (China) Peng Shuai	6	6
2	(Russia) Nadia Petrova (Slovenia) Katarina Srebotnik	2	1

Final
1	(Italy) Sara Errani (Italy) Roberta Vinci	6	3	[8]
(Chinese Taipei) Hsieh Su-wei (China) Peng Shuai	4	6	[10]

=== Top half ===
First round
(South Africa) N Grandin (Czech Republic) V Uhlířová	1	2
(France) K Mladenovic (Kazakhstan) G Voskoboeva	6	6
(Slovakia) D Hantuchová (Spain) A Medina Garrigues	3	1
(Italy) F Schiavone (Australia) S Stosur	6	6
(Japan) S Aoyama (Latvia) L Dekmeijere	1	3
6	(United States) B Mattek-Sands (India) S Mirza	6	6
(Czech Republic) A Hlaváčková (Croatia) P Martić	6	6
(Czech Republic) E Birnerová (Ukraine) I Buryachok	0	1
(Belarus) O Govortsova (United States) M Moulton-Levy	3	6	[13]
(Chinese Taipei) H-c Chan (Croatia) D Jurak	6	3	[11]
(Russia) A Kudryavtseva (Australia) A Rodionova	7	7
5	(United States) R Kops-Jones (United States) A Spears	5	5

Second round
1	(Italy) S Errani (Italy) R Vinci	7	6
(France) K Mladenovic (Kazakhstan) G Voskoboeva	5	4
(Italy) F Schiavone (Australia) S Stosur	4	3
6	(United States) B Mattek-Sands (India) S Mirza	6	6
Alt	(Colombia) C Castaño (Colombia) M Duque	3	6^{4}
(Czech Republic) A Hlaváčková (Croatia) P Martić	6	7^{7}
(Belarus) O Govortsova (United States) M Moulton-Levy	6	4	[7]
(Russia) A Kudryavtseva (Australia) A Rodionova	2	6	[10]

Quarterfinals
1	(Italy) S Errani (Italy) R Vinci	6	6
6	(United States) B Mattek-Sands (India) S Mirza	4	3
(Czech Republic) A Hlaváčková (Croatia) P Martić	3	1
(Russia) A Kudryavtseva (Australia) A Rodionova	6	6

Semifinals
1	(Italy) S Errani (Italy) R Vinci	6	6
(Russia) A Kudryavtseva (Australia) A Rodionova	2	1

=== Bottom half ===
First round
8	(China) S Zhang (China) J Zheng	3	1
(Slovakia) D Cibulková (Romania) M Niculescu	6	6
WC	(Russia) S Kuznetsova (Italy) F Pennetta	7^{7}	4	[7]
(United States) L Raymond (United Kingdom) L Robson	6^{2}	6	[10]
WC	(Italy) ME Camerin (Italy) K Knapp	5	4
(Chinese Taipei) S-w Hsieh (China) S Peng	7	6
7	(Germany) A-L Grönefeld (Czech Republic) K Peschke	6	6
(Georgia (country)) O Kalashnikova (Poland) A Rosolska	1	1
WC	(Serbia) J Janković (Croatia) M Lučić-Baroni	6	6
(Germany) J Görges (Luxembourg) M Minella	4	1
(Hungary) K Marosi (Georgia (country)) A Tatishvili	5	6	[10]
WC	(Italy) N Burnett (United States) C McHale	7	4	[6]

Second round
(Slovakia) D Cibulková (Romania) M Niculescu	6	6
(United States) L Raymond (United Kingdom) L Robson	4	4
(Chinese Taipei) S-w Hsieh (China) S Peng	7^{8}	6
4	(United States) L Huber (Spain) MJ Martínez Sánchez	6^{6}	1
7	(Germany) A-L Grönefeld (Czech Republic) K Peschke	6	3	[10]
WC	(Serbia) J Janković (Croatia) M Lučić-Baroni	1	6	[12]
(Hungary) K Marosi (Georgia (country)) A Tatishvili	2	5
2	(Russia) N Petrova (Slovenia) K Srebotnik	6	7

Quarterfinals
(Slovakia) D Cibulková (Romania) M Niculescu	4	4
(Chinese Taipei) S-w Hsieh (China) S Peng	6	6
WC	(Serbia) J Janković (Croatia) M Lučić-Baroni	2	1
2	(Russia) N Petrova (Slovenia) K Srebotnik	6	6

Semifinals
(Chinese Taipei) S-w Hsieh (China) S Peng	6	6
2	(Russia) N Petrova (Slovenia) K Srebotnik	2	1
