= 2013 Italian Open (tennis) =

- Date: 13–19 May
- Edition: 70th
- Category: Masters 1000; Premier 5
- Draw: 56S / 24D; 56S / 28D
- Prize money: €3,204,745 $2,369,000
- Surface: Clay / outdoor
- Location: Rome, Italy
- Venue: Foro Italico

Champions

Men's singles
- (Spain) Rafael Nadal

Women's singles
- (United States) Serena Williams

Men's doubles
- (United States) Bob Bryan / (United States) Mike Bryan

Women's doubles
- (Chinese Taipei) Hsieh Su-wei / (China) Peng Shuai
← 2012 ·	Italian Open	· 2014 →

The 2013 Italian Open (also known as the 2013 Rome Masters and sponsored title 2013 Internazionali BNL d'Italia) was a tennis tournament played on outdoor clay courts at the Foro Italico in Rome, Italy. It was the 70th edition of the Italian Open and was classified as an ATP World Tour Masters 1000 event on the 2013 ATP World Tour and a Premier 5 event on the 2013 WTA Tour. It took place from 13 to 19 May 2013.

== Finals ==
=== Men's singles ===
- (Spain) Rafael Nadal defeated (Switzerland) Roger Federer, 6–1, 6–3.

=== Women's singles ===
- (United States) Serena Williams defeated (Belarus) Victoria Azarenka, 6–1, 6–3

=== Men's doubles ===
- (United States) Bob Bryan / (United States) Mike Bryan defeated (India) Mahesh Bhupathi / (India) Rohan Bopanna, 6–2, 6–3

=== Women's doubles ===
- (Chinese Taipei) Hsieh Su-wei / (China) Peng Shuai defeated (Italy) Sara Errani / (Italy) Roberta Vinci, 4–6, 6–3, [10–8]

== Points and prize money ==
=== Point distribution ===
Event	W	F	SF	QF	Round of 16	Round of 32	Round of 64	Q	Q2	Q1
Men's singles	1000	600	360	180	90	45	10	25	16	0
Men's doubles	1000	600	360	180	90	0	—	—	—	—
Women's singles	900	620	395	225	125	70	5	30	20	1
Women's doubles	900	620	395	225	125	5	—	—	—	—

=== Prize money ===
Event	W	F	SF	QF	Round of 16	Round of 32	Round of 64	Q2	Q1
Men's singles	€501,700	€246,000	€123,900	€62,950	€32,700	€17,235	€9,305	€2,140	€1,090
Women's singles	€343,548	€171,774	€85,835	€39,548	€19,597	€10,065	€5,173	€2,871	€1,484
Men's doubles	€155,400	€76,060	€38,150	€19,580	€10,120	€5,340	—	—	—
Women's doubles	€98,387	€49,677	€24,589	€12,371	€6,274	€3,097	—	—	—

== ATP main draw entrants ==
=== Singles ===
==== Seeds ====
Country	Player	Rank^{1}	Seed
SRB	Novak Djokovic	1	1
SUI	Roger Federer	2	2
GBR	Andy Murray	3	3
ESP	David Ferrer	4	4
ESP	Rafael Nadal	5	5
CZE	Tomáš Berdych	6	6
ARG	Juan Martín del Potro	7	7
FRA	Jo-Wilfried Tsonga	8	8
FRA	Richard Gasquet	9	9
~~SRB~~	~~Janko Tipsarević~~	~~10~~	~~10~~
CRO	Marin Čilić	11	11
ESP	Nicolás Almagro	12	12
GER	Tommy Haas	13	13
CAN	Milos Raonic	14	14
SUI	Stanislas Wawrinka	15	15
JPN	Kei Nishikori	16	16

- Rankings are as of May 6, 2013.

==== Other entrants ====
The following players received wildcards into the main draw:

- (Italy) Paolo Lorenzi
- (Italy) Potito Starace
- (Italy) Matteo Viola
- (Italy) Filippo Volandri

The following players received entry from the qualifying draw:

- (Argentina) Carlos Berlocq
- (Colombia) Santiago Giraldo
- (Kazakhstan) Andrey Golubev
- (Latvia) Ernests Gulbis
- (Czech Republic) Jan Hájek
- (Russia) Andrey Kuznetsov
- (Spain) Albert Montañés

The following player received entry as a lucky loser:

- (Czech Republic) Lukáš Rosol

==== Withdrawals ====
Before the tournament

- (Brazil) Thomaz Bellucci
- (United States) Mardy Fish
- (Germany) Florian Mayer
- (Serbia) Janko Tipsarević (bronchitis)
- (Australia) Bernard Tomic (personal reasons)

During the tournament

- (Germany) Philipp Kohlschreiber
- (Switzerland) Stanislas Wawrinka (thigh injury)

==== Retirements ====
- (Belgium) Xavier Malisse (right wrist injury)
- (United Kingdom) Andy Murray (hip injury)

=== Doubles ===
==== Seeds ====
Country	Player	Country	Player	Rank^{1}	Seed
USA	Bob Bryan	USA	Mike Bryan	2	1
ESP	Marcel Granollers	ESP	Marc López	7	2
SWE	Robert Lindstedt	CAN	Daniel Nestor	13	3
PAK	Aisam-ul-Haq Qureshi	NED	Jean-Julien Rojer	16	4
BLR	Max Mirnyi	ROU	Horia Tecău	18	5
IND	Mahesh Bhupathi	IND	Rohan Bopanna	21	6
AUT	Alexander Peya	BRA	Bruno Soares	32	7
AUT	Jürgen Melzer	IND	Leander Paes	43	8

- Rankings are as of May 6, 2013.

==== Other entrants ====
The following pairs received wildcards into the doubles main draw:

- (Italy) Flavio Cipolla / (Italy) Filippo Volandri
- (Italy) Paolo Lorenzi / (Italy) Potito Starace

==== Withdrawals ====
Before the tournament

- (Belgium) Xavier Malisse (right wrist injury)

== WTA main draw entrants ==
=== Singles ===
==== Seeds ====
Country	Player	Rank^{1}	Seed
USA	Serena Williams	1	1
RUS	Maria Sharapova	2	2
BLR	Victoria Azarenka	3	3
POL	Agnieszka Radwańska	4	4
CHN	Li Na	5	5
~~GER~~	~~Angelique Kerber~~	~~6~~	~~6~~
ITA	Sara Errani	7	7
CZE	Petra Kvitová	8	8
AUS	Samantha Stosur	9	9
DEN	Caroline Wozniacki	10	10
RUS	Nadia Petrova	11	11
RUS	Maria Kirilenko	12	12
ITA	Roberta Vinci	13	13
SVK	Dominika Cibulková	15	14
SRB	Ana Ivanovic	16	15
USA	Sloane Stephens	17	16

- Rankings are as of May 6, 2013.

==== Other entrants ====
The following players received wildcards into the main draw:

- (Italy) Nastassja Burnett
- (Italy) Karin Knapp
- (Italy) Flavia Pennetta

The following players received entry from the qualifying draw:

- (United States) Mallory Burdette
- (Romania) Simona Halep
- (Czech Republic) Andrea Hlaváčková
- (France) Mathilde Johansson
- (Spain) Anabel Medina Garrigues
- (Spain) Garbiñe Muguruza
- (United States) Melanie Oudin
- (Ukraine) Lesia Tsurenko

The following player received entry as a lucky loser:

- (Spain) Lourdes Domínguez Lino

==== Withdrawals ====
Before the tournament

- (Germany) Mona Barthel
- (France) Marion Bartoli (foot injury)
- (Germany) Angelique Kerber (abdominal injury)
- (Austria) Tamira Paszek (respiratory infection)
- (Kazakhstan) Yaroslava Shvedova (right arm injury)
- (United Kingdom) Heather Watson (mononucleosis)

During the tournament

- (Russia) Maria Sharapova (illness)

==== Retirements ====
- (Russia) Maria Kirilenko
- (Russia) Ekaterina Makarova (left Achilles tendon injury)
- (Japan) Ayumi Morita

=== Doubles ===
==== Seeds ====
Country	Player	Country	Player	Rank^{1}	Seed
ITA	Sara Errani	ITA	Roberta Vinci	2	1
RUS	Nadia Petrova	SLO	Katarina Srebotnik	11	2
RUS	Ekaterina Makarova	RUS	Elena Vesnina	13	3
USA	Liezel Huber	ESP	María José Martínez Sánchez	25	4
USA	Raquel Kops-Jones	USA	Abigail Spears	29	5
USA	Bethanie Mattek-Sands	IND	Sania Mirza	35	6
GER	Anna-Lena Grönefeld	CZE	Květa Peschke	40	7
CHN	Zhang Shuai	CHN	Zheng Jie	48	8

- Rankings are as of May 6, 2013.

==== Other entrants ====
The following pairs received wildcards into the doubles main draw:

- (Italy) Nastassja Burnett / (United States) Christina McHale
- (Italy) Maria Elena Camerin / (Italy) Karin Knapp
- (Serbia) Jelena Janković / (Croatia) Mirjana Lučić-Baroni
- (Italy) Flavia Pennetta / (Russia) Svetlana Kuznetsova

The following pair received entry as alternates:

- (Colombia) Catalina Castaño / (Colombia) Mariana Duque Mariño

==== Withdrawals ====
Before the tournament

- (Russia) Ekaterina Makarova (left achillis injury)
