= 2013 Sony Open Tennis =

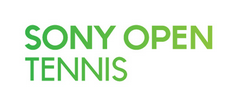
- Date: March 18–31
- Edition: 29th
- Category: Masters 1000 (ATP); Premier Mandatory (WTA)
- Draw: 96S / 32D
- Prize money: $5,185,625
- Surface: Hard - outdoor
- Location: Key Biscayne, Miami, United States
- Venue: Tennis Center at Crandon Park

Champions

Men's singles
- (United Kingdom) Andy Murray

Women's singles
- (United States) Serena Williams

Men's doubles
- (Pakistan) Aisam-ul-Haq Qureshi / (Netherlands) Jean-Julien Rojer

Women's doubles
- (Russia) Nadia Petrova / (Slovenia) Katarina Srebotnik
- Miami Masters

The 2013 Sony Open Tennis (also known as 2013 Miami Masters), a men's and women's tennis tournament, was the 29th edition of the Miami Masters event and played on outdoor hard courts at the Tennis Center at Crandon Park in Miami, United States. The tournament was held from March 18 to 31, 2013, and was part of the 2013 ATP World Tour and the 2013 WTA Tour, classified as an ATP World Tour Masters 1000 and a Premier Mandatory event, respectively.

== Finals ==
=== Men's singles ===
- (United Kingdom) Andy Murray defeated (Spain) David Ferrer, 2–6, 6–4, 7–6^{(7–1)}

=== Women's singles ===
- (United States) Serena Williams defeated (Russia) Maria Sharapova, 4–6, 6–3, 6–0
- This was Williams' record sixth title, breaking Steffi Graf's record of five titles.

=== Men's doubles ===
- (Pakistan) Aisam-ul-Haq Qureshi / (Netherlands) Jean-Julien Rojer defeated (Poland) Mariusz Fyrstenberg / (Poland) Marcin Matkowski, 6–4, 6–1

=== Women's doubles ===
- (Russia) Nadia Petrova / (Slovenia) Katarina Srebotnik defeated (United States) Lisa Raymond / (United Kingdom) Laura Robson, 6–1, 7–6^{(7–2)}

== Points and prize money ==
=== Point distribution ===
Event	W	F	SF	QF	Round of 16	Round of 32	Round of 64	Round of 128	Q	Q2	Q1
Men's singles	1000	600	360	180	90	45	25	10	16	8	0
Men's doubles	1000	600	360	180	90	45	0	—N/a	—N/a	—N/a	—N/a
Women's singles	1000	700	450	250	140	80	50	5	30	20	1
Women's doubles	1000	700	450	250	140	80	5	—N/a	—N/a	—N/a	—N/a

=== Prize money ===
The total commitment prize money for this year's event was $5,185,625 each (WTA Tour and ATP World Tour).

Event	W	F	SF	QF	Round of 16	Round of 32	Round of 64	Round of 128	Q2	Q1
Men's singles	$719,160	$350,970	$175,900	$89,670	$47,270	$25,300	$13,660	$8,370	$2,500	$1,275
Women's singles	$724,000	$353,200	$177,000	$90,250	$47,575	$25,450	$13,750	$8,425	$2,515	$1,285
Men's doubles	$235,640	$115,000	$57,640	$29,370	$15,490	$8,290	—N/a	—N/a	—N/a	—N/a
Women's doubles	$245,000	$122,997	$58,000	$29,547	$14,090	$8,140	—N/a	—N/a	—N/a	—N/a

== Players ==
=== Men's singles ===
==== Seeds ====
Country	Player	Rank^{1}	Seed
SRB	Novak Djokovic	1	1
GBR	Andy Murray	3	2
ESP	David Ferrer	5	3
CZE	Tomáš Berdych	6	4
ARG	Juan Martín del Potro	7	5
FRA	Jo-Wilfried Tsonga	8	6
SRB	Janko Tipsarević	9	7
FRA	Richard Gasquet	10	8
CRO	Marin Čilić	11	9
ESP	Nicolás Almagro	12	10
FRA	Gilles Simon	13	11
ARG	Juan Mónaco	14	12
JPN	Kei Nishikori	15	13
CAN	Milos Raonic	16	14
GER	Tommy Haas	18	15
ITA	Andreas Seppi	19	16
USA	Sam Querrey	20	17
GER	Philipp Kohlschreiber	21	18
UKR	Alexandr Dolgopolov	22	19
USA	John Isner	23	20
POL	Jerzy Janowicz	24	21
FRA	Jérémy Chardy	25	22
GER	Florian Mayer	26	23
FRA	Julien Benneteau	27	24
ESP	Fernando Verdasco	28	25
RSA	Kevin Anderson	29	26
SVK	Martin Kližan	30	27
RUS	Mikhail Youzhny	31	28
BUL	Grigor Dimitrov	32	29
ESP	Feliciano López	34	30
ESP	Marcel Granollers	35	31
ITA	Fabio Fognini	36	32

- ^{1} Rankings are as of March 18, 2013.

==== Other entrants ====
The following players received wildcards into the main draw:

- (United States) James Blake
- ~~(United States) Christian Harrison~~
- (Australia) Lleyton Hewitt
- (United States) Denis Kudla
- (Argentina) Guido Pella

The following player received entry using a protected ranking into the main draw:

- (India) Somdev Devvarman

The following players received entry from the qualifying draw:

- (Romania) Marius Copil
- (Canada) Frank Dancevic
- (Netherlands) Thiemo de Bakker
- (France) Marc Gicquel
- (United States) Robby Ginepri
- (Czech Republic) Jan Hájek
- (United States) Rajeev Ram
- (Belgium) Olivier Rochus
- (France) Guillaume Rufin
- (Israel) Dudi Sela
- (United States) Tim Smyczek

The following players received entry as lucky losers:

- (Germany) Daniel Brands
- (France) Édouard Roger-Vasselin

==== Withdrawals ====
Before the tournament

- (Cyprus) Marcos Baghdatis → replaced by (Portugal) João Sousa
- (United States) Brian Baker → replaced by (Argentina) Carlos Berlocq
- (Switzerland) Roger Federer → replaced by (India) Somdev Devvarman
- (United States) Mardy Fish → replaced by (Lithuania) Ričardas Berankis
- (United States) Christian Harrison (ankle injury) → replaced by (Germany) Daniel Brands
- (Spain) Feliciano López (wrist injury) → replaced by (France) Édouard Roger-Vasselin
- (France) Paul-Henri Mathieu → replaced by (Argentina) David Nalbandian
- (Spain) Rafael Nadal → replaced by (Japan) Tatsuma Ito
- (United States) Andy Roddick → replaced by (United States) Jesse Levine
- (Czech Republic) Radek Štěpánek → replaced by (Slovenia) Blaž Kavčič
- (Switzerland) Stanislas Wawrinka (arm and back injury) → replaced by (Germany) Tobias Kamke

During the tournament

- (Canada) Milos Raonic (strep throat)
- (Russia) Dmitry Tursunov (gastroenteritis)

==== Retirements ====
- (Spain) Roberto Bautista Agut (stomach muscle pain)
- (Argentina) Carlos Berlocq (knee injury)
- (Italy) Simone Bolelli (wrist injury)
- (Japan) Tatsuma Ito (cramping)
- (Russia) Andrey Kuznetsov (hip injury)
- (Argentina) Leonardo Mayer (back injury)

=== Men's doubles ===
==== Seeds ====
Country	Player	Country	Player	Rank^{1}	Seed
USA	Bob Bryan	USA	Mike Bryan	2	1
ESP	Marcel Granollers	ESP	Marc López	7	2
IND	Mahesh Bhupathi	CAN	Daniel Nestor	15	3
SWE	Robert Lindstedt	SRB	Nenad Zimonjić	25	4
PAK	Aisam-ul-Haq Qureshi	NED	Jean-Julien Rojer	27	5
AUT	Alexander Peya	BRA	Bruno Soares	33	6
FRA	Michaël Llodra	IND	Leander Paes	40	7
POL	Mariusz Fyrstenberg	POL	Marcin Matkowski	44	8

- ^{1} Rankings as of March 18, 2013.

==== Other entrants ====
The following pairs received wildcards into the doubles main draw:

- (United States) Christian Harrison / (United States) Ryan Harrison
- (Australia) Lleyton Hewitt / (Australia) Bernard Tomic

==== Withdrawals ====
During the tournament

- (Brazil) Thomaz Bellucci (left hip injury)

=== Women's singles ===
==== Seeds ====
Country	Player	Rank^{1}	Seed
USA	Serena Williams	1	1
RUS	Maria Sharapova	2	2
BLR	Victoria Azarenka	3	3
POL	Agnieszka Radwańska	4	4
CHN	Li Na	5	5
GER	Angelique Kerber	6	6
CZE	Petra Kvitová	7	7
ITA	Sara Errani	8	8
DEN	Caroline Wozniacki	10	9
FRA	Marion Bartoli	11	10
RUS	Nadia Petrova	12	11
SRB	Ana Ivanovic	13	12
SVK	Dominika Cibulková	14	13
RUS	Maria Kirilenko	15	14
ITA	Roberta Vinci	16	15
USA	Sloane Stephens	17	16
CZE	Lucie Šafářová	18	17
RUS	Ekaterina Makarova	19	18
USA	Venus Williams	20	19
ESP	Carla Suárez Navarro	21	20
CZE	Klára Zakopalová	22	21
SRB	Jelena Janković	23	22
RUS	Anastasia Pavlyuchenkova	24	23
GER	Julia Görges	25	24
USA	Varvara Lepchenko	26	25
AUT	Tamira Paszek	27	26
GER	Mona Barthel	28	27
ROU	Sorana Cîrstea	29	28
RUS	Elena Vesnina	30	29
BEL	Kirsten Flipkens	31	30
BEL	Yanina Wickmayer	32	31
FRA	Alizé Cornet	33	32

- Rankings are as of March 18, 2013

==== Other entrants ====
The following players received wildcards into the main draw:

- (Canada) Eugenie Bouchard
- (United States) Victoria Duval
- (United States) Madison Keys
- (Estonia) Anett Kontaveit
- (Spain) Garbiñe Muguruza
- (Germany) Andrea Petkovic
- (Puerto Rico) Monica Puig
- (Croatia) Ajla Tomljanović

The following player received entry using a protected ranking into the main draw:

- (Romania) Alexandra Dulgheru

The following players received entry from the qualifying draw:

- (United States) Mallory Burdette
- (Slovakia) Jana Čepelová
- (Hungary) Melinda Czink
- (United States) Allie Kiick
- (United States) Bethanie Mattek-Sands
- (Israel) Shahar Pe'er
- (Czech Republic) Karolína Plíšková
- (Kazakhstan) Yulia Putintseva
- (Czech Republic) Kateřina Siniaková
- (Spain) Sílvia Soler Espinosa
- (Croatia) Donna Vekić
- (Switzerland) Stefanie Vögele

The following players received entry as lucky loser:

- (United States) Lauren Davis

==== Withdrawals ====
Before the tournament

- (Belarus) Victoria Azarenka (right ankle injury) → replaced by (United States) Lauren Davis
- (Czech Republic) Petra Cetkovská → replaced by (Japan) Kimiko Date-Krumm
- (Estonia) Kaia Kanepi → replaced by (France) Pauline Parmentier
- (Australia) Samantha Stosur (right calf injury) → replaced by (Italy) Camila Giorgi

During the tournament

- (United States) Venus Williams (lower back injury)

==== Retirements ====
- (France) Marion Bartoli (left foot injury)
- (Georgia (country)) Anna Tatishvili (left ankle injury)

=== Women's doubles ===
==== Seeds ====
Country	Player	Country	Player	Rank^{1}	Seed
ITA	Sara Errani	ITA	Roberta Vinci	1	1
CZE	Andrea Hlaváčková	CZE	Lucie Hradecká	9	2
RUS	Nadia Petrova	SLO	Katarina Srebotnik	15	3
RUS	Ekaterina Makarova	RUS	Elena Vesnina	15	4
USA	Liezel Huber	ESP	María José Martínez Sánchez	24	5
USA	Raquel Kops-Jones	USA	Abigail Spears	31	6
USA	Bethanie Mattek-Sands	IND	Sania Mirza	35	7
GER	Julia Görges	KAZ	Yaroslava Shvedova	54	8

- ^{1} Rankings as of March 18, 2013.

==== Other entrants ====
The following pairs received wildcards into the doubles main draw:

- (United States) Madison Keys / (Croatia) Ajla Tomljanović
- (Russia) Svetlana Kuznetsova / (Italy) Flavia Pennetta
- (Spain) Garbiñe Muguruza / (Italy) Francesca Schiavone
- (United States) Lisa Raymond / (United Kingdom) Laura Robson

The following pair received entry as alternates:

- (Germany) Tatjana Malek / (Thailand) Tamarine Tanasugarn

==== Withdrawals ====
Before the tournament

- (United Kingdom) Heather Watson (left adductor injury)

During the tournament

- (Spain) María José Martínez Sánchez (left knee injury)
