= 2011 WTA Tour =

Women's tennis circuit

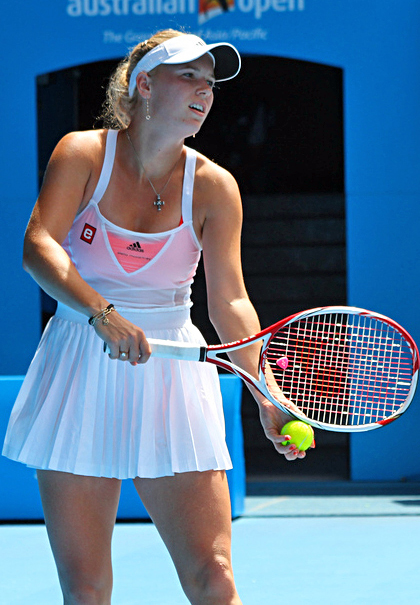
- Caroline Wozniacki finished the year as WTA world No. 1 for the second time in her career, though Petra Kvitová was named the Player of the Year. Wozniacki won six tournaments during the season, including two Premier Mandatory and Premier 5 events. Kvitová won six tournaments during the season, including a major at the Wimbledon Championships, the WTA Tour Championships, and a Premier Mandatory event. Wozniacki was the No. 1 player most of the season but briefly lost it to Kim Clijsters for a week.

Details
- Duration: 1 January – 7 November 2011
- Edition: 41st
- Tournaments: 57
- Categories: Grand Slam (4); WTA Championships (2); WTA Premier Mandatory (4); WTA Premier 5 (5); WTA Premier (11); WTA International (31)

Achievements (singles)
- Most titles: (Czech Republic) Petra Kvitová (Denmark) Caroline Wozniacki (6)
- Most finals: (Denmark) Caroline Wozniacki (8)
- Prize money leader: (Czech Republic) Petra Kvitová (US$5,145,943)
- Points leader: (Denmark) Caroline Wozniacki (7,395)

Awards
- Player of the year: (Czech Republic) Petra Kvitová
- Doubles team of the year: (Czech Republic) Květa Peschke (Slovenia) Katarina Srebotnik
- Most improved player of the year: (Czech Republic) Petra Kvitová
- Newcomer of the year: (Romania) Irina-Camelia Begu
- Comeback player of the year: (Germany) Sabine Lisicki

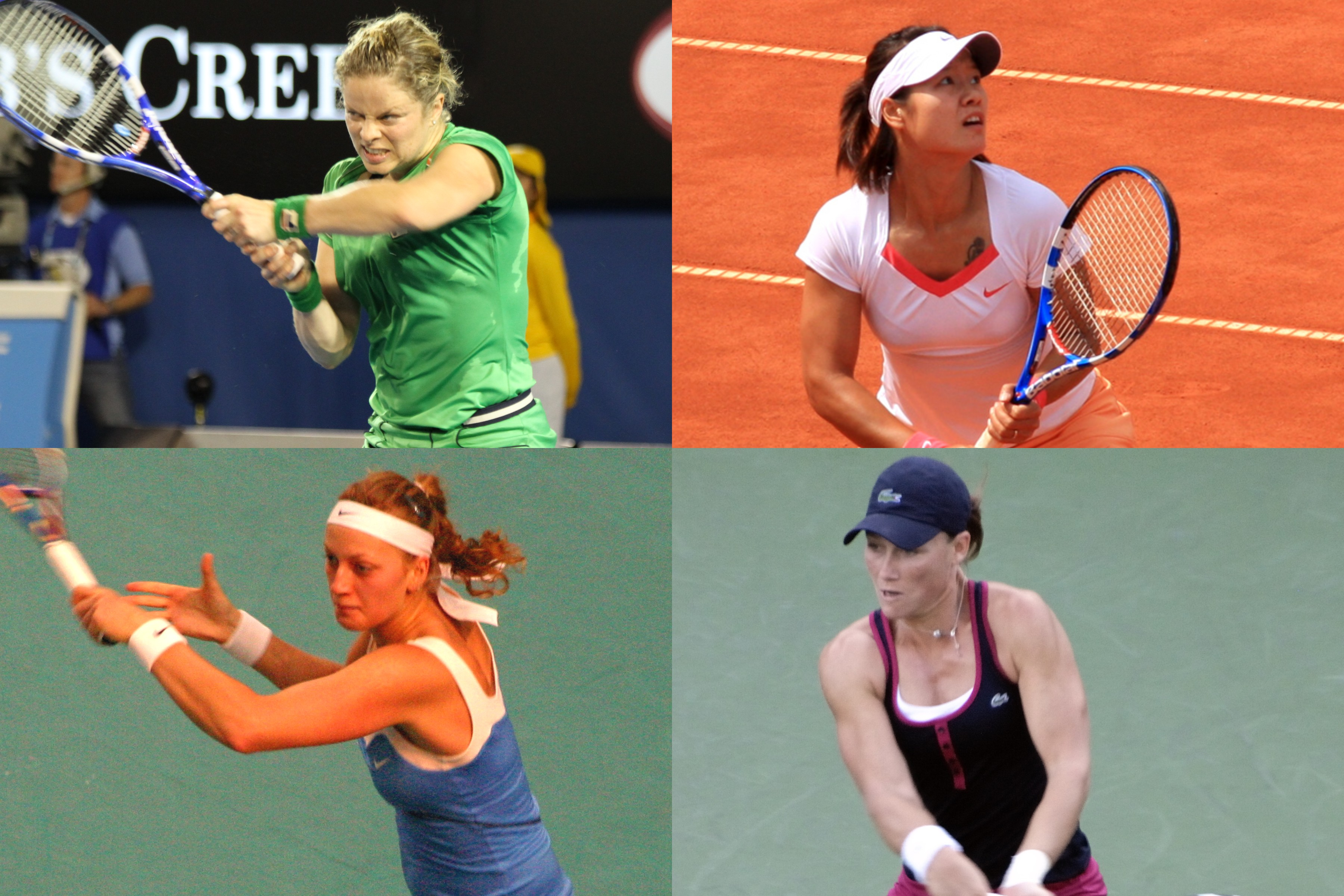
Kim Clijsters (top left) claimed her first Australian Open title and as well as her fourth (and last) Grand Slam title, defeating Li Na in the final. Li (top right) would go on to win her maiden Grand Slam title at French Open defeating defending champion Francesca Schiavone, thus becoming the first Asian and the first Chinese player to win the Grand Slam. Petra Kvitová (bottom left) won her maiden Grand Slam title at the Wimbledon defeating Maria Sharapova, thus becoming the first Czech to win the Grand Slam since Jana Novotná in 1998, and the first player born in the 1990s to win a Grand Slam title. Samantha Stosur (bottom right) won her maiden Grand Slam title at the US Open defeating Serena Williams in the final. Stosur becoming the first Australian to win a Grand Slam title since Evonne Goolagong Cawley in 1980 Wimbledon Championships.

The WTA Tour is the elite tour for women's professional tennis organized by the Women's Tennis Association (WTA). The 2011 WTA Tour includes the Grand Slam tournaments (sanctioned by the International Tennis Federation (ITF)), the WTA Premier tournaments, the WTA International tournaments, the Fed Cup (organized by the ITF), the Commonwealth Bank Tournament of Champions and the WTA Championships.

== Schedule ==
This is the complete schedule of events on the 2011 WTA Tour. Player progression will be documented from the quarterfinals stage.

Key

Grand Slam tournaments
Year-end championships
WTA Premier Mandatory
WTA Premier 5
WTA Premier
WTA International
Team events

=== January ===
Week	Tournament	Champions	Runners-up	Semifinalists	Quarterfinalists
3 Jan	Hyundai Hopman Cup; Perth, Australia; Mixed Teams Championships; Hard (i) – A$1,000,000 – 8 teams (RR)	United States; 2–1	Belgium	Round robin (group A) Serbia; Australia; Kazakhstan	Round robin (group B) Great Britain; Italy; France
3 Jan	Brisbane International; Brisbane, Australia; WTA International; Hard – $220,000 – 32S/16D; Singles – Doubles	(Czech Republic) Petra Kvitová; 6–1, 6–3	(Germany) Andrea Petkovic	(France) Marion Bartoli (Russia) Anastasia Pavlyuchenkova	(Australia) Jarmila Groth (Czech Republic) Barbora Záhlavová-Strýcová (Slovakia) Dominika Cibulková (Czech Republic) Lucie Šafářová
3 Jan	Brisbane International; Brisbane, Australia; WTA International; Hard – $220,000 – 32S/16D; Singles – Doubles	(Russia) Alisa Kleybanova (Russia) Anastasia Pavlyuchenkova; 6–3, 7–5	(Poland) Klaudia Jans (Poland) Alicja Rosolska	(France) Marion Bartoli (Russia) Anastasia Pavlyuchenkova	(Australia) Jarmila Groth (Czech Republic) Barbora Záhlavová-Strýcová (Slovakia) Dominika Cibulková (Czech Republic) Lucie Šafářová
3 Jan	ASB Classic; Auckland, New Zealand; WTA International; Hard – $220,000 – 32S/16D; Singles – Doubles	(Hungary) Gréta Arn; 6–3, 6–3	(Belgium) Yanina Wickmayer	(Germany) Julia Görges (China) Peng Shuai	(Russia) Maria Sharapova (Ukraine) Kateryna Bondarenko (United Kingdom) Heather Watson (Romania) Simona Halep
3 Jan	ASB Classic; Auckland, New Zealand; WTA International; Hard – $220,000 – 32S/16D; Singles – Doubles	(Czech Republic) Květa Peschke (Slovenia) Katarina Srebotnik; 6–3, 6–0	(Sweden) Sofia Arvidsson (New Zealand) Marina Erakovic	(Germany) Julia Görges (China) Peng Shuai	(Russia) Maria Sharapova (Ukraine) Kateryna Bondarenko (United Kingdom) Heather Watson (Romania) Simona Halep
10 Jan	Medibank International Sydney; Sydney, Australia; WTA Premier; Hard – $618,000 – 30S/16D; Singles – Doubles	(China) Li Na; 7–6^{(7–3)}, 6–3	(Belgium) Kim Clijsters	(Russia) Alisa Kleybanova (Serbia) Bojana Jovanovski	(Slovakia) Dominika Cibulková (Belarus) Victoria Azarenka (Russia) Svetlana Kuznetsova (Italy) Flavia Pennetta
10 Jan	Medibank International Sydney; Sydney, Australia; WTA Premier; Hard – $618,000 – 30S/16D; Singles – Doubles	(Czech Republic) Iveta Benešová (Czech Republic) Barbora Záhlavová-Strýcová; 4–6, 6–4, [10–7]	(Czech Republic) Květa Peschke (Slovenia) Katarina Srebotnik	(Russia) Alisa Kleybanova (Serbia) Bojana Jovanovski	(Slovakia) Dominika Cibulková (Belarus) Victoria Azarenka (Russia) Svetlana Kuznetsova (Italy) Flavia Pennetta
10 Jan	Moorilla Hobart International; Hobart, Australia; WTA International; Hard – $220,000 – 32S/16D; Singles – Doubles	(Australia) Jarmila Groth; 6–4, 6–3	(United States) Bethanie Mattek-Sands	(Czech Republic) Klára Zakopalová (China) Peng Shuai	(France) Marion Bartoli (Italy) Roberta Vinci (Italy) Sara Errani (Germany) Angelique Kerber
10 Jan	Moorilla Hobart International; Hobart, Australia; WTA International; Hard – $220,000 – 32S/16D; Singles – Doubles	(Italy) Sara Errani (Italy) Roberta Vinci; 6–3, 7–5	(Ukraine) Kateryna Bondarenko (Latvia) Līga Dekmeijere	(Czech Republic) Klára Zakopalová (China) Peng Shuai	(France) Marion Bartoli (Italy) Roberta Vinci (Italy) Sara Errani (Germany) Angelique Kerber
17 Jan; 24 Jan	Australian Open; Melbourne, Australia; Grand Slam $10,366,780 – hard 128S/96Q/64D/32X; Singles – Doubles – Mixed doubles	(Belgium) Kim Clijsters; 3–6, 6–3, 6–3	(China) Li Na	(Denmark) Caroline Wozniacki (Russia) Vera Zvonareva	(Italy) Francesca Schiavone (Germany) Andrea Petkovic (Poland) Agnieszka Radwańska (Czech Republic) Petra Kvitová
17 Jan; 24 Jan	Australian Open; Melbourne, Australia; Grand Slam $10,366,780 – hard 128S/96Q/64D/32X; Singles – Doubles – Mixed doubles	(Argentina) Gisela Dulko (Italy) Flavia Pennetta; 2–6, 7–5, 6–1	(Belarus) Victoria Azarenka (Russia) Maria Kirilenko	(Denmark) Caroline Wozniacki (Russia) Vera Zvonareva	(Italy) Francesca Schiavone (Germany) Andrea Petkovic (Poland) Agnieszka Radwańska (Czech Republic) Petra Kvitová
17 Jan; 24 Jan	Australian Open; Melbourne, Australia; Grand Slam $10,366,780 – hard 128S/96Q/64D/32X; Singles – Doubles – Mixed doubles	(Slovenia) Katarina Srebotnik (Canada) Daniel Nestor; 6–3, 3–6, [10–7]	(Chinese Taipei) Chan Yung-Jan (Australia) Paul Hanley	(Denmark) Caroline Wozniacki (Russia) Vera Zvonareva	(Italy) Francesca Schiavone (Germany) Andrea Petkovic (Poland) Agnieszka Radwańska (Czech Republic) Petra Kvitová
31 Jan	Fed Cup by BNP Paribas: Quarterfinals; Hobart, Australia, Hard; Moscow, Russia, Hard (i); Bratislava, Slovakia, Hard (i); Antwerp, Belgium, (i)	Quarterfinals Winners; Italy 4–1; Russia 3–2; Czech Republic 3–2; Belgium 4–1	Quarterfinals Losers; Australia; France; Slovakia; United States		

=== February ===
Week	Tournament	Champions	Runners-up	Semifinalists	Quarterfinalists
7 Feb	Open GDF Suez; Paris, France; WTA Premier; Hard (i) – $618,000 – 30S/16D; Singles – Doubles	(Czech Republic) Petra Kvitová; 6–4, 6–3	(Belgium) Kim Clijsters	(Estonia) Kaia Kanepi (United States) Bethanie Mattek-Sands	(Australia) Jelena Dokić (Slovakia) Dominika Cibulková (Belgium) Yanina Wickmayer (Germany) Andrea Petkovic
7 Feb	Open GDF Suez; Paris, France; WTA Premier; Hard (i) – $618,000 – 30S/16D; Singles – Doubles	(United States) Bethanie Mattek-Sands (United States) Meghann Shaughnessy; 6–4, 6–2	(Russia) Vera Dushevina (Russia) Ekaterina Makarova	(Estonia) Kaia Kanepi (United States) Bethanie Mattek-Sands	(Australia) Jelena Dokić (Slovakia) Dominika Cibulková (Belgium) Yanina Wickmayer (Germany) Andrea Petkovic
7 Feb	PTT Pattaya Open; Pattaya, Thailand; WTA International; Hard – $220,000 – 32S/16D; Singles – Doubles	(Slovakia) Daniela Hantuchová; 6–0, 6–2	(Italy) Sara Errani	(Russia) Vera Zvonareva (Italy) Roberta Vinci	(China) Peng Shuai (Uzbekistan) Akgul Amanmuradova (Kazakhstan) Galina Voskoboeva (Serbia) Ana Ivanovic
7 Feb	PTT Pattaya Open; Pattaya, Thailand; WTA International; Hard – $220,000 – 32S/16D; Singles – Doubles	(Italy) Sara Errani (Italy) Roberta Vinci; 3–6, 6–3, [10–5]	(China) Sun Shengnan (China) Zheng Jie	(Russia) Vera Zvonareva (Italy) Roberta Vinci	(China) Peng Shuai (Uzbekistan) Akgul Amanmuradova (Kazakhstan) Galina Voskoboeva (Serbia) Ana Ivanovic
14 Feb	Dubai Duty Free Tennis Championships; Dubai, United Arab Emirates; WTA Premier 5 Hard – $2,050,000 – 56S/28D; Singles – Doubles	(Denmark) Caroline Wozniacki; 6–1, 6–3	(Russia) Svetlana Kuznetsova	(Serbia) Jelena Janković (Italy) Flavia Pennetta	(Israel) Shahar Pe'er (Australia) Samantha Stosur (Poland) Agnieszka Radwańska (Russia) Alisa Kleybanova
14 Feb	Dubai Duty Free Tennis Championships; Dubai, United Arab Emirates; WTA Premier 5 Hard – $2,050,000 – 56S/28D; Singles – Doubles	(United States) Liezel Huber (Spain) María José Martínez Sánchez; 7–6^{(7–5)}, 6–3	(Czech Republic) Květa Peschke (Slovenia) Katarina Srebotnik	(Serbia) Jelena Janković (Italy) Flavia Pennetta	(Israel) Shahar Pe'er (Australia) Samantha Stosur (Poland) Agnieszka Radwańska (Russia) Alisa Kleybanova
14 Feb	Cellular South Cup; Memphis, United States; WTA International; Hard (i) – $220,000 – 32S/16D; Singles – Doubles	(Slovakia) Magdaléna Rybáriková; 6–2, ret.	(Canada) Rebecca Marino	(Czech Republic) Lucie Hradecká (Russia) Evgeniya Rodina	(United States) Alexa Glatch (Russia) Ksenia Pervak (United Kingdom) Heather Watson (United States) CoCo Vandeweghe
14 Feb	Cellular South Cup; Memphis, United States; WTA International; Hard (i) – $220,000 – 32S/16D; Singles – Doubles	(Belarus) Olga Govortsova (Russia) Alla Kudryavtseva; 6–3, 4–6, [10–8]	(Czech Republic) Andrea Hlaváčková (Czech Republic) Lucie Hradecká	(Czech Republic) Lucie Hradecká (Russia) Evgeniya Rodina	(United States) Alexa Glatch (Russia) Ksenia Pervak (United Kingdom) Heather Watson (United States) CoCo Vandeweghe
14 Feb	XIX Copa BBVA Colsanitas; Bogotá, Colombia; WTA International $220,000 – clay (red) – 32S/16D; Singles – Doubles	(Spain) Lourdes Domínguez Lino; 2–6, 6–3, 6–2	(France) Mathilde Johansson	(Spain) Carla Suárez Navarro (Croatia) Petra Martić	(China) Han Xinyun (Colombia) Catalina Castaño (Spain) Beatriz García Vidagany (Spain) Laura Pous Tió
14 Feb	XIX Copa BBVA Colsanitas; Bogotá, Colombia; WTA International $220,000 – clay (red) – 32S/16D; Singles – Doubles	(Romania) Edina Gallovits-Hall (Spain) Anabel Medina Garrigues; 2–6, 7–6^{(8–6)}, [11–9]	(Canada) Sharon Fichman (Spain) Laura Pous Tió	(Spain) Carla Suárez Navarro (Croatia) Petra Martić	(China) Han Xinyun (Colombia) Catalina Castaño (Spain) Beatriz García Vidagany (Spain) Laura Pous Tió
21 Feb	Qatar Ladies Open; Doha, Qatar; WTA Premier; Hard – $721,000 – 28S/16D; Singles – Doubles	(Russia) Vera Zvonareva; 6–4, 6–4	(Denmark) Caroline Wozniacki	(France) Marion Bartoli (Serbia) Jelena Janković	(Italy) Flavia Pennetta (China) Peng Shuai (Czech Republic) Klára Zakopalová (Slovakia) Daniela Hantuchová
21 Feb	Qatar Ladies Open; Doha, Qatar; WTA Premier; Hard – $721,000 – 28S/16D; Singles – Doubles	(Czech Republic) Květa Peschke (Slovenia) Katarina Srebotnik; 7–5, 6–7^{(2–7)}, [10–8]	(United States) Liezel Huber (Russia) Nadia Petrova	(France) Marion Bartoli (Serbia) Jelena Janković	(Italy) Flavia Pennetta (China) Peng Shuai (Czech Republic) Klára Zakopalová (Slovakia) Daniela Hantuchová
21 Feb	Abierto Mexicano Telcel; Acapulco, Mexico; WTA International $220,000 – clay (red) – 32S/16D; Singles – Doubles	(Argentina) Gisela Dulko; 6–3, 7–6^{(7–5)}	(Spain) Arantxa Parra Santonja	(Spain) Anabel Medina Garrigues (Sweden) Johanna Larsson	(Spain) Carla Suárez Navarro (Spain) Laura Pous Tió (Hungary) Gréta Arn (Spain) Lourdes Domínguez Lino
21 Feb	Abierto Mexicano Telcel; Acapulco, Mexico; WTA International $220,000 – clay (red) – 32S/16D; Singles – Doubles	(Ukraine) Mariya Koryttseva (Romania) Ioana Raluca Olaru; 3–6, 6–1, [10–4]	(Spain) Lourdes Domínguez Lino (Spain) Arantxa Parra Santonja	(Spain) Anabel Medina Garrigues (Sweden) Johanna Larsson	(Spain) Carla Suárez Navarro (Spain) Laura Pous Tió (Hungary) Gréta Arn (Spain) Lourdes Domínguez Lino
28 Feb	Monterrey Open; Monterrey, Mexico; WTA International; Hard – $220,000 – 32S/16D; Singles – Doubles	(Russia) Anastasia Pavlyuchenkova; 2–6, 6–2, 6–3	(Serbia) Jelena Janković	(Slovenia) Polona Hercog (Argentina) Gisela Dulko	(Latvia) Anastasija Sevastova (Belarus) Olga Govortsova (Russia) Ksenia Pervak (Hungary) Gréta Arn
28 Feb	Monterrey Open; Monterrey, Mexico; WTA International; Hard – $220,000 – 32S/16D; Singles – Doubles	(Czech Republic) Iveta Benešová (Czech Republic) Barbora Záhlavová-Strýcová; 6–7^{(8–10)}, 6–2, [10–6]	(Germany) Anna-Lena Grönefeld (United States) Vania King	(Slovenia) Polona Hercog (Argentina) Gisela Dulko	(Latvia) Anastasija Sevastova (Belarus) Olga Govortsova (Russia) Ksenia Pervak (Hungary) Gréta Arn
28 Feb	BMW Malaysian Open; Kuala Lumpur, Malaysia; WTA International; Hard – $220,000 – 32S/16D; Singles – Doubles	(Australia) Jelena Dokić; 2–6, 7–6^{(11–9)}, 6–4	(Czech Republic) Lucie Šafářová	(Netherlands) Michaëlla Krajicek (Australia) Jarmila Gajdošová	(Serbia) Bojana Jovanovski (Luxembourg) Anne Kremer (Japan) Ayumi Morita (France) Marion Bartoli
28 Feb	BMW Malaysian Open; Kuala Lumpur, Malaysia; WTA International; Hard – $220,000 – 32S/16D; Singles – Doubles	(Russia) Dinara Safina (Kazakhstan) Galina Voskoboeva; 7–5, 2–6, [10–5]	(Thailand) Noppawan Lertcheewakarn (Australia) Jessica Moore	(Netherlands) Michaëlla Krajicek (Australia) Jarmila Gajdošová	(Serbia) Bojana Jovanovski (Luxembourg) Anne Kremer (Japan) Ayumi Morita (France) Marion Bartoli

=== March ===
Week	Tournament	Champions	Runners-up	Semifinalists	Quarterfinalists
7 Mar; 14 Mar	BNP Paribas Open; Indian Wells, United States; WTA Premier Mandatory; Hard – $4,500,000 – 96S/32D; Singles – Doubles	(Denmark) Caroline Wozniacki; 6–1, 2–6, 6–3	(France) Marion Bartoli	(Russia) Maria Sharapova (Belgium) Yanina Wickmayer	(Belarus) Victoria Azarenka (China) Peng Shuai (Israel) Shahar Pe'er (Serbia) Ana Ivanovic
7 Mar; 14 Mar	BNP Paribas Open; Indian Wells, United States; WTA Premier Mandatory; Hard – $4,500,000 – 96S/32D; Singles – Doubles	(India) Sania Mirza (Russia) Elena Vesnina; 6–0, 7–5	(United States) Bethanie Mattek-Sands (United States) Meghann Shaughnessy	(Russia) Maria Sharapova (Belgium) Yanina Wickmayer	(Belarus) Victoria Azarenka (China) Peng Shuai (Israel) Shahar Pe'er (Serbia) Ana Ivanovic
21 Mar; 28 Mar	Sony Ericsson Open; Key Biscayne, United States; WTA Premier Mandatory; Hard – $4,500,000 – 96S/32D; Singles – Doubles	(Belarus) Victoria Azarenka; 6–1, 6–4	(Russia) Maria Sharapova	(Germany) Andrea Petkovic (Russia) Vera Zvonareva	(Serbia) Jelena Janković (Romania) Alexandra Dulgheru (Poland) Agnieszka Radwańska (Belgium) Kim Clijsters
21 Mar; 28 Mar	Sony Ericsson Open; Key Biscayne, United States; WTA Premier Mandatory; Hard – $4,500,000 – 96S/32D; Singles – Doubles	(Slovakia) Daniela Hantuchová (Poland) Agnieszka Radwańska; 7–6^{(7–5)}, 2–6, [10–8]	(United States) Liezel Huber (Russia) Nadia Petrova	(Germany) Andrea Petkovic (Russia) Vera Zvonareva	(Serbia) Jelena Janković (Romania) Alexandra Dulgheru (Poland) Agnieszka Radwańska (Belgium) Kim Clijsters

=== April ===
Week	Tournament	Champions	Runners-up	Semifinalists	Quarterfinalists
4 Apr	Family Circle Cup; Charleston, United States; WTA Premier $721,000 – clay (green) – 56S/16D; Singles – Doubles	(Denmark) Caroline Wozniacki; 6–2, 6–3	(Russia) Elena Vesnina	(Serbia) Jelena Janković (China) Peng Shuai	(Belgium) Yanina Wickmayer (United States) Christina McHale (India) Sania Mirza (Germany) Julia Görges
4 Apr	Family Circle Cup; Charleston, United States; WTA Premier $721,000 – clay (green) – 56S/16D; Singles – Doubles	(India) Sania Mirza (Russia) Elena Vesnina; 6–4, 6–4	(United States) Bethanie Mattek-Sands (United States) Meghann Shaughnessy	(Serbia) Jelena Janković (China) Peng Shuai	(Belgium) Yanina Wickmayer (United States) Christina McHale (India) Sania Mirza (Germany) Julia Görges
4 Apr	Andalucia Tennis Experience; Marbella, Spain; WTA International $220,000 – clay (red) – 32S/16D; Singles – Doubles	(Belarus) Victoria Azarenka; 6–3, 6–2	(Romania) Irina-Camelia Begu	(Italy) Sara Errani (Russia) Svetlana Kuznetsova	(Russia) Dinara Safina (Romania) Alexandra Dulgheru (Czech Republic) Klára Zakopalová (Spain) Lara Arruabarrena-Vecino
4 Apr	Andalucia Tennis Experience; Marbella, Spain; WTA International $220,000 – clay (red) – 32S/16D; Singles – Doubles	(Spain) Nuria Llagostera Vives (Spain) Arantxa Parra Santonja; 3–6, 6–4, [10–5]	(Italy) Sara Errani (Italy) Roberta Vinci	(Italy) Sara Errani (Russia) Svetlana Kuznetsova	(Russia) Dinara Safina (Romania) Alexandra Dulgheru (Czech Republic) Klára Zakopalová (Spain) Lara Arruabarrena-Vecino
11 April	Fed Cup by BNP Paribas: Semifinals; Moscow, Russia, Hard (i); Charleroi, Belgium, Hard (i)	Semifinal winners Russia 5–0; Czech Republic 3–2	Semifinal losers Italy; Belgium		
18 Apr	Porsche Tennis Grand Prix; Stuttgart, Germany; WTA Premier $721,000 – clay (red) (i) – 28S/16D; Singles – Doubles	(Germany) Julia Görges; 7–6^{(7–3)}, 6–3	(Denmark) Caroline Wozniacki	(Poland) Agnieszka Radwańska (Australia) Samantha Stosur	(Germany) Andrea Petkovic (Germany) Kristina Barrois (Germany) Sabine Lisicki (Russia) Vera Zvonareva
18 Apr	Porsche Tennis Grand Prix; Stuttgart, Germany; WTA Premier $721,000 – clay (red) (i) – 28S/16D; Singles – Doubles	(Germany) Sabine Lisicki (Australia) Samantha Stosur; 6–1, 7–6^{(7–5)}	(Germany) Kristina Barrois (Germany) Jasmin Wöhr	(Poland) Agnieszka Radwańska (Australia) Samantha Stosur	(Germany) Andrea Petkovic (Germany) Kristina Barrois (Germany) Sabine Lisicki (Russia) Vera Zvonareva
18 Apr	Grand Prix SAR La Princesse Lalla Meryem; Fes, Morocco; WTA International $220,000 – clay (red) – 32S/16D; Singles – Doubles	(Italy) Alberta Brianti; 6–4, 6–3	(Romania) Simona Halep	(Belgium) Kirsten Flipkens (Russia) Dinara Safina	(Morocco) Nadia Lalami (Hungary) Gréta Arn (United States) Melanie Oudin (Russia) Anastasia Pivovarova
18 Apr	Grand Prix SAR La Princesse Lalla Meryem; Fes, Morocco; WTA International $220,000 – clay (red) – 32S/16D; Singles – Doubles	(Czech Republic) Andrea Hlaváčková (Czech Republic) Renata Voráčová; 6–3, 6–4	(Russia) Nina Bratchikova (Austria) Sandra Klemenschits	(Belgium) Kirsten Flipkens (Russia) Dinara Safina	(Morocco) Nadia Lalami (Hungary) Gréta Arn (United States) Melanie Oudin (Russia) Anastasia Pivovarova
25 Apr	Barcelona Ladies Open; Barcelona, Spain; WTA International $220,000 – clay (red) – 32S/16D; Singles – Doubles	(Italy) Roberta Vinci; 4–6, 6–2, 6–2	(Czech Republic) Lucie Hradecká	(Spain) Laura Pous Tió (Italy) Sara Errani	(France) Virginie Razzano (Slovenia) Polona Hercog (Italy) Alberta Brianti (Spain) Estrella Cabeza Candela
25 Apr	Barcelona Ladies Open; Barcelona, Spain; WTA International $220,000 – clay (red) – 32S/16D; Singles – Doubles	(Czech Republic) Iveta Benešová (Czech Republic) Barbora Záhlavová-Strýcová; 5–7, 6–4, [11–9]	(South Africa) Natalie Grandin (Czech Republic) Vladimíra Uhlířová	(Spain) Laura Pous Tió (Italy) Sara Errani	(France) Virginie Razzano (Slovenia) Polona Hercog (Italy) Alberta Brianti (Spain) Estrella Cabeza Candela
25 Apr	Estoril Open; Oeiras, Portugal; WTA International $220,000 – clay (red) – 32S/16D; Singles – Doubles	(Spain) Anabel Medina Garrigues; 6–1, 6–2	(Germany) Kristina Barrois	(Sweden) Johanna Larsson (Romania) Monica Niculescu	(Russia) Alisa Kleybanova (Russia) Alla Kudryavtseva (Czech Republic) Klára Zakopalová (Australia) Jarmila Gajdošová
25 Apr	Estoril Open; Oeiras, Portugal; WTA International $220,000 – clay (red) – 32S/16D; Singles – Doubles	(Russia) Alisa Kleybanova (Kazakhstan) Galina Voskoboeva; 6–4, 6–2	(Greece) Eleni Daniilidou (Netherlands) Michaëlla Krajicek	(Sweden) Johanna Larsson (Romania) Monica Niculescu	(Russia) Alisa Kleybanova (Russia) Alla Kudryavtseva (Czech Republic) Klára Zakopalová (Australia) Jarmila Gajdošová

=== May ===
Week	Tournament	Champions	Runners-up	Semifinalists	Quarterfinalists
2 May	Mutua Madrileña Madrid Open; Madrid, Spain; WTA Premier Mandatory $4,500,000 – clay (red) – 64S/28D; Singles – Doubles	(Czech Republic) Petra Kvitová; 7–6^{(7–3)}, 6–4	(Belarus) Victoria Azarenka	(Germany) Julia Görges (China) Li Na	(Russia) Anastasia Pavlyuchenkova (Czech Republic) Lucie Šafářová (United States) Bethanie Mattek-Sands (Slovakia) Dominika Cibulková
2 May	Mutua Madrileña Madrid Open; Madrid, Spain; WTA Premier Mandatory $4,500,000 – clay (red) – 64S/28D; Singles – Doubles	(Belarus) Victoria Azarenka (Russia) Maria Kirilenko; 6–4, 6–3	(Czech Republic) Květa Peschke (Slovenia) Katarina Srebotnik	(Germany) Julia Görges (China) Li Na	(Russia) Anastasia Pavlyuchenkova (Czech Republic) Lucie Šafářová (United States) Bethanie Mattek-Sands (Slovakia) Dominika Cibulková
9 May	Internazionali BNL d'Italia; Rome, Italy; WTA Premier 5 $2,050,000 – clay (red) – 56S/28D; Singles – Doubles	(Russia) Maria Sharapova; 6–2, 6–4	(Australia) Samantha Stosur	(Denmark) Caroline Wozniacki (China) Li Na	(Serbia) Jelena Janković (Belarus) Victoria Azarenka (Hungary) Gréta Arn (Italy) Francesca Schiavone
9 May	Internazionali BNL d'Italia; Rome, Italy; WTA Premier 5 $2,050,000 – clay (red) – 56S/28D; Singles – Doubles	(China) Peng Shuai (China) Zheng Jie; 6–2, 6–3	(United States) Vania King (Kazakhstan) Yaroslava Shvedova	(Denmark) Caroline Wozniacki (China) Li Na	(Serbia) Jelena Janković (Belarus) Victoria Azarenka (Hungary) Gréta Arn (Italy) Francesca Schiavone
16 May	Brussels Open by GDF Suez; Brussels, Belgium; WTA Premier $618,000 – clay (red) – 30S/16D; Singles – Doubles	(Denmark) Caroline Wozniacki; 2–6, 6–3, 6–3	(China) Peng Shuai	(Italy) Francesca Schiavone (Russia) Vera Zvonareva	(Belgium) Yanina Wickmayer (Japan) Ayumi Morita (Sweden) Sofia Arvidsson (Romania) Alexandra Dulgheru
16 May	Brussels Open by GDF Suez; Brussels, Belgium; WTA Premier $618,000 – clay (red) – 30S/16D; Singles – Doubles	(Czech Republic) Andrea Hlaváčková (Kazakhstan) Galina Voskoboeva; 3–6, 6–0, [10–5]	(Poland) Klaudia Jans (Poland) Alicja Rosolska	(Italy) Francesca Schiavone (Russia) Vera Zvonareva	(Belgium) Yanina Wickmayer (Japan) Ayumi Morita (Sweden) Sofia Arvidsson (Romania) Alexandra Dulgheru
16 May	Internationaux de Strasbourg; Strasbourg, France; WTA International $220,000 – clay (red) – 32S/16D; Singles – Doubles	(Germany) Andrea Petkovic; 6–4, 1–0 ret.	(France) Marion Bartoli	(Spain) Anabel Medina Garrigues (Slovakia) Daniela Hantuchová	(Czech Republic) Lucie Hradecká (Croatia) Mirjana Lučić (Russia) Nadia Petrova (Russia) Maria Kirilenko
16 May	Internationaux de Strasbourg; Strasbourg, France; WTA International $220,000 – clay (red) – 32S/16D; Singles – Doubles	(Uzbekistan) Akgul Amanmuradova (Chinese Taipei) Chuang Chia-jung; 6–4, 5–7, [10–2]	(South Africa) Natalie Grandin (Czech Republic) Vladimíra Uhlířová	(Spain) Anabel Medina Garrigues (Slovakia) Daniela Hantuchová	(Czech Republic) Lucie Hradecká (Croatia) Mirjana Lučić (Russia) Nadia Petrova (Russia) Maria Kirilenko
23 May; 30 May	French Open; Paris, France; Grand Slam $10,676,582 – clay (red); 128S/96Q/64D/32X; Singles – Doubles – Mixed doubles	(China) Li Na; 6–4, 7–6^{(7–0)}	(Italy) Francesca Schiavone	(France) Marion Bartoli (Russia) Maria Sharapova	(Russia) Svetlana Kuznetsova (Russia) Anastasia Pavlyuchenkova (Belarus) Victoria Azarenka (Germany) Andrea Petkovic
23 May; 30 May	French Open; Paris, France; Grand Slam $10,676,582 – clay (red); 128S/96Q/64D/32X; Singles – Doubles – Mixed doubles	(Czech Republic) Andrea Hlaváčková (Czech Republic) Lucie Hradecká; 6–4, 6–3	(India) Sania Mirza (Russia) Elena Vesnina	(France) Marion Bartoli (Russia) Maria Sharapova	(Russia) Svetlana Kuznetsova (Russia) Anastasia Pavlyuchenkova (Belarus) Victoria Azarenka (Germany) Andrea Petkovic
23 May; 30 May	French Open; Paris, France; Grand Slam $10,676,582 – clay (red); 128S/96Q/64D/32X; Singles – Doubles – Mixed doubles	(Australia) Casey Dellacqua (United States) Scott Lipsky; 7–6^{(8–6)}, 4–6, [10–7]	(Slovenia) Katarina Srebotnik (Serbia) Nenad Zimonjić	(France) Marion Bartoli (Russia) Maria Sharapova	(Russia) Svetlana Kuznetsova (Russia) Anastasia Pavlyuchenkova (Belarus) Victoria Azarenka (Germany) Andrea Petkovic

=== June ===
Week	Tournament	Champions	Runners-up	Semifinalists	Quarterfinalists
6 Jun	Aegon Classic; Birmingham, Great Britain; WTA International; Grass – $220,000 – 56S/16D; Singles – Doubles	(Germany) Sabine Lisicki; 6–3, 6–2	(Slovakia) Daniela Hantuchová	(China) Peng Shuai (Serbia) Ana Ivanovic	(Slovakia) Magdaléna Rybáriková (New Zealand) Marina Erakovic (United States) Alison Riske (Croatia) Mirjana Lučić
6 Jun	Aegon Classic; Birmingham, Great Britain; WTA International; Grass – $220,000 – 56S/16D; Singles – Doubles	(Belarus) Olga Govortsova (Russia) Alla Kudryavtseva; 1–6, 6–1, [10–5]	(Italy) Sara Errani (Italy) Roberta Vinci	(China) Peng Shuai (Serbia) Ana Ivanovic	(Slovakia) Magdaléna Rybáriková (New Zealand) Marina Erakovic (United States) Alison Riske (Croatia) Mirjana Lučić
6 Jun	e-Boks Sony Ericsson Open; Copenhagen, Denmark; WTA International; Hard(i) – $220,000 – 32S/16D; Singles – Doubles	(Denmark) Caroline Wozniacki; 6–1, 6–4	(Czech Republic) Lucie Šafářová	(Germany) Mona Barthel (Croatia) Petra Martić	(Italy) Alberta Brianti (United States) Bethanie Mattek-Sands (China) Zhang Shuai (Ukraine) Alona Bondarenko
6 Jun	e-Boks Sony Ericsson Open; Copenhagen, Denmark; WTA International; Hard(i) – $220,000 – 32S/16D; Singles – Doubles	(Sweden) Johanna Larsson (Germany) Jasmin Wöhr; 6–3, 6–3	(France) Kristina Mladenovic (Poland) Katarzyna Piter	(Germany) Mona Barthel (Croatia) Petra Martić	(Italy) Alberta Brianti (United States) Bethanie Mattek-Sands (China) Zhang Shuai (Ukraine) Alona Bondarenko
13 Jun	Aegon International; Eastbourne, Great Britain; WTA Premier; Grass – $618,000 – 32S/16D; Singles – Doubles	(France) Marion Bartoli; 6–1, 4–6, 7–5	(Czech Republic) Petra Kvitová	(Australia) Samantha Stosur (Slovakia) Daniela Hantuchová	(Russia) Vera Zvonareva (Belarus) Victoria Azarenka (Poland) Agnieszka Radwańska (United States) Venus Williams
13 Jun	Aegon International; Eastbourne, Great Britain; WTA Premier; Grass – $618,000 – 32S/16D; Singles – Doubles	(Czech Republic) Květa Peschke (Slovenia) Katarina Srebotnik; 6–3, 6–0	(United States) Liezel Huber (United States) Lisa Raymond	(Australia) Samantha Stosur (Slovakia) Daniela Hantuchová	(Russia) Vera Zvonareva (Belarus) Victoria Azarenka (Poland) Agnieszka Radwańska (United States) Venus Williams
13 Jun	UNICEF Open 's-Hertogenbosch, Netherlands; WTA International; Grass – $220,000 – 32S/16D; Singles – Doubles	(Italy) Roberta Vinci; 6–7^{(7–9)}, 6–3, 7–5	(Australia) Jelena Dokić	(Italy) Romina Oprandi (Slovakia) Dominika Cibulková	(Japan) Kimiko Date-Krumm (Sweden) Johanna Larsson (Belgium) Yanina Wickmayer (Russia) Svetlana Kuznetsova
13 Jun	UNICEF Open 's-Hertogenbosch, Netherlands; WTA International; Grass – $220,000 – 32S/16D; Singles – Doubles	(Czech Republic) Barbora Záhlavová-Strýcová (Czech Republic) Klára Zakopalová; 1–6, 6–4, [10–7]	(Slovakia) Dominika Cibulková (Italy) Flavia Pennetta	(Italy) Romina Oprandi (Slovakia) Dominika Cibulková	(Japan) Kimiko Date-Krumm (Sweden) Johanna Larsson (Belgium) Yanina Wickmayer (Russia) Svetlana Kuznetsova
20 Jun; 27 Jun	Wimbledon Championships; London, Great Britain; Grand Slam $10,141,303 – grass 128S/96Q/64D/48X; Singles – Doubles – Mixed doubles	(Czech Republic) Petra Kvitová; 6–3, 6–4	(Russia) Maria Sharapova	(Germany) Sabine Lisicki (Belarus) Victoria Azarenka	(Slovakia) Dominika Cibulková (France) Marion Bartoli (Austria) Tamira Paszek (Bulgaria) Tsvetana Pironkova
20 Jun; 27 Jun	Wimbledon Championships; London, Great Britain; Grand Slam $10,141,303 – grass 128S/96Q/64D/48X; Singles – Doubles – Mixed doubles	(Czech Republic) Květa Peschke (Slovenia) Katarina Srebotnik; 6–3, 6–1	(Germany) Sabine Lisicki (Australia) Samantha Stosur	(Germany) Sabine Lisicki (Belarus) Victoria Azarenka	(Slovakia) Dominika Cibulková (France) Marion Bartoli (Austria) Tamira Paszek (Bulgaria) Tsvetana Pironkova
20 Jun; 27 Jun	Wimbledon Championships; London, Great Britain; Grand Slam $10,141,303 – grass 128S/96Q/64D/48X; Singles – Doubles – Mixed doubles	(Austria) Jürgen Melzer (Czech Republic) Iveta Benešová; 6–3, 6–2	(India) Mahesh Bhupathi (Russia) Elena Vesnina	(Germany) Sabine Lisicki (Belarus) Victoria Azarenka	(Slovakia) Dominika Cibulková (France) Marion Bartoli (Austria) Tamira Paszek (Bulgaria) Tsvetana Pironkova

=== July ===
Week	Tournament	Champions	Runners-up	Semifinalists	Quarterfinalists
4 Jul	Poli-Farbe Budapest Grand Prix; Budapest, Hungary; WTA International $220,000 – clay (red) – 32S/16D; Singles – Doubles	(Italy) Roberta Vinci; 6–4, 1–6, 6–4	(Romania) Irina-Camelia Begu	(Czech Republic) Klára Zakopalová (Spain) Anabel Medina Garrigues	(Slovakia) Zuzana Kučová (Ukraine) Kateryna Bondarenko (Spain) Estrella Cabeza Candela (Italy) Sara Errani
4 Jul	Poli-Farbe Budapest Grand Prix; Budapest, Hungary; WTA International $220,000 – clay (red) – 32S/16D; Singles – Doubles	(Spain) Anabel Medina Garrigues (Poland) Alicja Rosolska; 6–2, 6–2	(South Africa) Natalie Grandin (Czech Republic) Vladimíra Uhlířová	(Czech Republic) Klára Zakopalová (Spain) Anabel Medina Garrigues	(Slovakia) Zuzana Kučová (Ukraine) Kateryna Bondarenko (Spain) Estrella Cabeza Candela (Italy) Sara Errani
4 Jul	Collector Swedish Open; Båstad, Sweden; WTA International $220,000 – clay (red) – 32S/16D; Singles – Doubles	(Slovenia) Polona Hercog; 6–4, 7–5	(Sweden) Johanna Larsson	(Sweden) Sofia Arvidsson (Czech Republic) Barbora Záhlavová-Strýcová	(Spain) María José Martínez Sánchez (Spain) Lourdes Domínguez Lino (Russia) Vesna Dolonts (Italy) Flavia Pennetta
4 Jul	Collector Swedish Open; Båstad, Sweden; WTA International $220,000 – clay (red) – 32S/16D; Singles – Doubles	(Spain) Lourdes Domínguez Lino (Spain) María José Martínez Sánchez; 6–3, 6–3	(Spain) Nuria Llagostera Vives (Spain) Arantxa Parra Santonja	(Sweden) Sofia Arvidsson (Czech Republic) Barbora Záhlavová-Strýcová	(Spain) María José Martínez Sánchez (Spain) Lourdes Domínguez Lino (Russia) Vesna Dolonts (Italy) Flavia Pennetta
11 Jul	Internazionali Femminili di Palermo; Palermo, Italy; WTA International $220,000 – clay (red) – 32S/16D; Singles – Doubles	(Spain) Anabel Medina Garrigues; 6–3, 6–2	(Slovenia) Polona Hercog	(Italy) Flavia Pennetta (Czech Republic) Petra Cetkovská	(Bulgaria) Tsvetana Pironkova (Czech Republic) Klára Zakopalová (Italy) Sara Errani (Romania) Irina-Camelia Begu
11 Jul	Internazionali Femminili di Palermo; Palermo, Italy; WTA International $220,000 – clay (red) – 32S/16D; Singles – Doubles	(Italy) Sara Errani (Italy) Roberta Vinci; 7–5, 6–1	(Czech Republic) Andrea Hlaváčková (Czech Republic) Klára Zakopalová	(Italy) Flavia Pennetta (Czech Republic) Petra Cetkovská	(Bulgaria) Tsvetana Pironkova (Czech Republic) Klára Zakopalová (Italy) Sara Errani (Romania) Irina-Camelia Begu
11 Jul	Gastein Ladies; Bad Gastein, Austria; WTA International $220,000 – clay (red) – 32S/16D; Singles – Doubles	(Spain) María José Martínez Sánchez; 6–0, 7–5	(Austria) Patricia Mayr-Achleitner	(Russia) Ksenia Pervak (Ukraine) Kateryna Bondarenko	(Spain) Laura Pous Tió (Bulgaria) Dia Evtimova (Austria) Yvonne Meusburger (Spain) Carla Suárez Navarro
11 Jul	Gastein Ladies; Bad Gastein, Austria; WTA International $220,000 – clay (red) – 32S/16D; Singles – Doubles	(Czech Republic) Eva Birnerová (Czech Republic) Lucie Hradecká; 4–6, 6–2, [12–10]	(Australia) Jarmila Gajdošová (Germany) Julia Görges	(Russia) Ksenia Pervak (Ukraine) Kateryna Bondarenko	(Spain) Laura Pous Tió (Bulgaria) Dia Evtimova (Austria) Yvonne Meusburger (Spain) Carla Suárez Navarro
18 July	Baku Cup; Baku, Azerbaijan; WTA International; Hard – $220,000 – 32S/16D; Singles – Doubles	(Russia) Vera Zvonareva; 6–1, 6–4	(Russia) Ksenia Pervak	(Ukraine) Mariya Koryttseva (Kazakhstan) Galina Voskoboeva	(Georgia (country)) Anna Tatishvili (Ukraine) Kateryna Bondarenko (France) Aravane Rezaï (Russia) Anastasia Pavlyuchenkova
18 July	Baku Cup; Baku, Azerbaijan; WTA International; Hard – $220,000 – 32S/16D; Singles – Doubles	(Ukraine) Mariya Koryttseva (Belarus) Tatiana Poutchek; 6–3, 2–6, [10–8]	(Romania) Monica Niculescu (Kazakhstan) Galina Voskoboeva	(Ukraine) Mariya Koryttseva (Kazakhstan) Galina Voskoboeva	(Georgia (country)) Anna Tatishvili (Ukraine) Kateryna Bondarenko (France) Aravane Rezaï (Russia) Anastasia Pavlyuchenkova
25 Jul	Bank of the West Classic; Stanford, United States; WTA Premier; Hard – $721,000 – 28S/16D; Singles – Doubles	(United States) Serena Williams; 7–5, 6–1	(France) Marion Bartoli	(Slovakia) Dominika Cibulková (Germany) Sabine Lisicki	(New Zealand) Marina Erakovic (Japan) Ayumi Morita (Poland) Agnieszka Radwańska (Russia) Maria Sharapova
25 Jul	Bank of the West Classic; Stanford, United States; WTA Premier; Hard – $721,000 – 28S/16D; Singles – Doubles	(Belarus) Victoria Azarenka (Russia) Maria Kirilenko; 6–1, 6–3	(United States) Liezel Huber (United States) Lisa Raymond	(Slovakia) Dominika Cibulková (Germany) Sabine Lisicki	(New Zealand) Marina Erakovic (Japan) Ayumi Morita (Poland) Agnieszka Radwańska (Russia) Maria Sharapova
25 Jul	Citi Open; Washington, D.C., United States; WTA International; Hard – $220,000 – 32S/16D; Singles – Doubles	(Russia) Nadia Petrova; 7–5, 6–2	(Israel) Shahar Pe'er	(Austria) Tamira Paszek (United States) Irina Falconi	(Italy) Alberta Brianti (Canada) Stéphanie Dubois (France) Virginie Razzano (Serbia) Bojana Jovanovski
25 Jul	Citi Open; Washington, D.C., United States; WTA International; Hard – $220,000 – 32S/16D; Singles – Doubles	(India) Sania Mirza (Kazakhstan) Yaroslava Shvedova; 6–3, 6–3	(Belarus) Olga Govortsova (Russia) Alla Kudryavtseva	(Austria) Tamira Paszek (United States) Irina Falconi	(Italy) Alberta Brianti (Canada) Stéphanie Dubois (France) Virginie Razzano (Serbia) Bojana Jovanovski

=== August ===
Week	Tournament	Champions	Runners-up	Semifinalists	Quarterfinalists
1 Aug	Mercury Insurance Open; San Diego, United States; WTA Premier; Hard – $721,000 – 56S/16D; Singles – Doubles	(Poland) Agnieszka Radwańska; 6–3, 6–4	(Russia) Vera Zvonareva	(Serbia) Ana Ivanovic (Germany) Andrea Petkovic	(Germany) Sabine Lisicki (China) Peng Shuai (Slovakia) Daniela Hantuchová (United States) Sloane Stephens
1 Aug	Mercury Insurance Open; San Diego, United States; WTA Premier; Hard – $721,000 – 56S/16D; Singles – Doubles	(Czech Republic) Květa Peschke (Slovenia) Katarina Srebotnik; 6–0, 6–2	(United States) Raquel Kops-Jones (United States) Abigail Spears	(Serbia) Ana Ivanovic (Germany) Andrea Petkovic	(Germany) Sabine Lisicki (China) Peng Shuai (Slovakia) Daniela Hantuchová (United States) Sloane Stephens
8 Aug	Rogers Cup; Toronto, Canada; WTA Premier 5 Hard – $2,050,000 – 56S/64Q/28D; Singles – Doubles	(United States) Serena Williams; 6–4, 6–2	(Australia) Samantha Stosur	(Poland) Agnieszka Radwańska (Belarus) Victoria Azarenka	(Italy) Roberta Vinci (Germany) Andrea Petkovic (Kazakhstan) Galina Voskoboeva (Czech Republic) Lucie Šafářová
8 Aug	Rogers Cup; Toronto, Canada; WTA Premier 5 Hard – $2,050,000 – 56S/64Q/28D; Singles – Doubles	(United States) Liezel Huber (United States) Lisa Raymond walkover	(Belarus) Victoria Azarenka (Russia) Maria Kirilenko	(Poland) Agnieszka Radwańska (Belarus) Victoria Azarenka	(Italy) Roberta Vinci (Germany) Andrea Petkovic (Kazakhstan) Galina Voskoboeva (Czech Republic) Lucie Šafářová
15 Aug	Western & Southern Open; Mason, United States; WTA Premier 5 Hard – $2,050,000 – 56S/28D; Singles – Doubles	(Russia) Maria Sharapova; 4–6, 7–6^{(7–3)}, 6–3	(Serbia) Jelena Janković	(Germany) Andrea Petkovic (Russia) Vera Zvonareva	(Russia) Nadia Petrova (China) Peng Shuai (Australia) Samantha Stosur (Slovakia) Daniela Hantuchová
15 Aug	Western & Southern Open; Mason, United States; WTA Premier 5 Hard – $2,050,000 – 56S/28D; Singles – Doubles	(United States) Vania King (Kazakhstan) Yaroslava Shvedova; 6–4, 3–6, [11–9]	(South Africa) Natalie Grandin (Czech Republic) Vladimíra Uhlířová	(Germany) Andrea Petkovic (Russia) Vera Zvonareva	(Russia) Nadia Petrova (China) Peng Shuai (Australia) Samantha Stosur (Slovakia) Daniela Hantuchová
22 Aug	New Haven Open at Yale; New Haven, United States; WTA Premier; Hard – $618,000 – 28S/16D; Singles – Doubles	(Denmark) Caroline Wozniacki; 6–4, 6–1	(Czech Republic) Petra Cetkovská	(Italy) Francesca Schiavone (China) Li Na	(United States) Christina McHale (Spain) Anabel Medina Garrigues (France) Marion Bartoli (Russia) Anastasia Pavlyuchenkova
22 Aug	New Haven Open at Yale; New Haven, United States; WTA Premier; Hard – $618,000 – 28S/16D; Singles – Doubles	(Chinese Taipei) Chuang Chia-jung (Belarus) Olga Govortsova; 7–5, 6–2	(Italy) Sara Errani (Italy) Roberta Vinci	(Italy) Francesca Schiavone (China) Li Na	(United States) Christina McHale (Spain) Anabel Medina Garrigues (France) Marion Bartoli (Russia) Anastasia Pavlyuchenkova
22 Aug	Texas Tennis Open; Dallas, United States; WTA International; Hard – $220,000 – 32S/16D; Singles – Doubles	(Germany) Sabine Lisicki; 6–2, 6–1	(France) Aravane Rezaï	(Germany) Angelique Kerber (Romania) Irina-Camelia Begu	(Sweden) Johanna Larsson (United Kingdom) Elena Baltacha (Latvia) Anastasija Sevastova (Ukraine) Kateryna Bondarenko
22 Aug	Texas Tennis Open; Dallas, United States; WTA International; Hard – $220,000 – 32S/16D; Singles – Doubles	(Italy) Alberta Brianti (Romania) Sorana Cîrstea; 7–5, 6–3	(France) Alizé Cornet (France) Pauline Parmentier	(Germany) Angelique Kerber (Romania) Irina-Camelia Begu	(Sweden) Johanna Larsson (United Kingdom) Elena Baltacha (Latvia) Anastasija Sevastova (Ukraine) Kateryna Bondarenko
29 Aug; 5 Sep	US Open; New York City, United States; Grand Slam $10,768,000 – hard 128S/64D/32X; Singles – Doubles – Mixed doubles	(Australia) Samantha Stosur; 6–2, 6–3	(United States) Serena Williams	(Denmark) Caroline Wozniacki (Germany) Angelique Kerber	(Germany) Andrea Petkovic (Russia) Anastasia Pavlyuchenkova (Italy) Flavia Pennetta (Russia) Vera Zvonareva
29 Aug; 5 Sep	US Open; New York City, United States; Grand Slam $10,768,000 – hard 128S/64D/32X; Singles – Doubles – Mixed doubles	(United States) Liezel Huber (United States) Lisa Raymond; 4–6, 7–6^{(7–5)}, 7–6^{(7–3)}	(United States) Vania King (Kazakhstan) Yaroslava Shvedova	(Denmark) Caroline Wozniacki (Germany) Angelique Kerber	(Germany) Andrea Petkovic (Russia) Anastasia Pavlyuchenkova (Italy) Flavia Pennetta (Russia) Vera Zvonareva
29 Aug; 5 Sep	US Open; New York City, United States; Grand Slam $10,768,000 – hard 128S/64D/32X; Singles – Doubles – Mixed doubles	(United States) Melanie Oudin (United States) Jack Sock; 7–6^{(7–4)}, 4–6, [10–8]	(Argentina) Gisela Dulko (Argentina) Eduardo Schwank	(Denmark) Caroline Wozniacki (Germany) Angelique Kerber	(Germany) Andrea Petkovic (Russia) Anastasia Pavlyuchenkova (Italy) Flavia Pennetta (Russia) Vera Zvonareva

=== September ===
Week	Tournament	Champions	Runners-up	Semifinalists	Quarterfinalists
12 Sep	Tashkent Open; Tashkent, Uzbekistan; WTA International; Hard – $220,000 – 32S/16D; Singles – Doubles	(Russia) Ksenia Pervak; 6–3, 6–1	(Czech Republic) Eva Birnerová	(Poland) Urszula Radwańska (Russia) Alla Kudryavtseva	(France) Victoria Larrière (Greece) Eleni Daniilidou (Russia) Valeria Savinykh (Romania) Sorana Cîrstea
12 Sep	Tashkent Open; Tashkent, Uzbekistan; WTA International; Hard – $220,000 – 32S/16D; Singles – Doubles	(Greece) Eleni Daniilidou (Russia) Vitalia Diatchenko; 6–4, 6–3	(Ukraine) Lyudmyla Kichenok (Ukraine) Nadiia Kichenok	(Poland) Urszula Radwańska (Russia) Alla Kudryavtseva	(France) Victoria Larrière (Greece) Eleni Daniilidou (Russia) Valeria Savinykh (Romania) Sorana Cîrstea
12 Sep	Bell Challenge; Quebec City, Canada; WTA International; Carpet (i) – $220,000 – 32S/16D; Singles – Doubles	(Czech Republic) Barbora Záhlavová-Strýcová; 4–6, 6–1, 6–0	(New Zealand) Marina Erakovic	(Austria) Tamira Paszek (Netherlands) Michaëlla Krajicek	(Slovakia) Daniela Hantuchová (United Kingdom) Heather Watson (Canada) Rebecca Marino (Czech Republic) Andrea Hlaváčková
12 Sep	Bell Challenge; Quebec City, Canada; WTA International; Carpet (i) – $220,000 – 32S/16D; Singles – Doubles	(United States) Raquel Kops-Jones (United States) Abigail Spears; 6–1, 3–6, [10–6]	(United States) Jamie Hampton (Georgia (country)) Anna Tatishvili	(Austria) Tamira Paszek (Netherlands) Michaëlla Krajicek	(Slovakia) Daniela Hantuchová (United Kingdom) Heather Watson (Canada) Rebecca Marino (Czech Republic) Andrea Hlaváčková
19 Sep	Hansol Korea Open; Seoul, South Korea; WTA International; Hard – $220,000 – 32S/16D; Singles – Doubles	(Spain) María José Martínez Sánchez; 7–6^{(7–0)}, 7–6^{(7–2)}	(Kazakhstan) Galina Voskoboeva	(Slovenia) Polona Hercog (Czech Republic) Klára Zakopalová	(Russia) Vera Dushevina (Slovakia) Dominika Cibulková (Germany) Julia Görges (United States) Vania King
19 Sep	Hansol Korea Open; Seoul, South Korea; WTA International; Hard – $220,000 – 32S/16D; Singles – Doubles	(South Africa) Natalie Grandin (Czech Republic) Vladimíra Uhlířová; 7–6^{(7–5)}, 6–4	(Russia) Vera Dushevina (Kazakhstan) Galina Voskoboeva	(Slovenia) Polona Hercog (Czech Republic) Klára Zakopalová	(Russia) Vera Dushevina (Slovakia) Dominika Cibulková (Germany) Julia Görges (United States) Vania King
19 Sep	Guangzhou International Women's Open; Guangzhou, China; WTA International; Hard – $220,000 – 32S/16D; Singles – Doubles	(South Africa) Chanelle Scheepers; 6–2, 6–2	(Slovakia) Magdaléna Rybáriková	(Russia) Maria Kirilenko (China) Zheng Jie	(Ukraine) Tetiana Luzhanska (Poland) Urszula Radwańska (Croatia) Petra Martić (Australia) Jarmila Gajdošová
19 Sep	Guangzhou International Women's Open; Guangzhou, China; WTA International; Hard – $220,000 – 32S/16D; Singles – Doubles	(Chinese Taipei) Hsieh Su-wei (China) Zheng Saisai; 6–2, 6–1	(Chinese Taipei) Chan Chin-wei (China) Han Xinyun	(Russia) Maria Kirilenko (China) Zheng Jie	(Ukraine) Tetiana Luzhanska (Poland) Urszula Radwańska (Croatia) Petra Martić (Australia) Jarmila Gajdošová
26 Sep	Toray Pan Pacific Open; Tokyo, Japan; WTA Premier 5 Hard – $2,050,000 – 56S/16D; Singles – Doubles	(Poland) Agnieszka Radwańska; 6–3, 6–2	(Russia) Vera Zvonareva	(Belarus) Victoria Azarenka (Czech Republic) Petra Kvitová	(Estonia) Kaia Kanepi (France) Marion Bartoli (Russia) Maria Kirilenko (Russia) Maria Sharapova
26 Sep	Toray Pan Pacific Open; Tokyo, Japan; WTA Premier 5 Hard – $2,050,000 – 56S/16D; Singles – Doubles	(United States) Liezel Huber (United States) Lisa Raymond; 7–6^{(7–4)}, 0–6, [10–6]	(Argentina) Gisela Dulko (Italy) Flavia Pennetta	(Belarus) Victoria Azarenka (Czech Republic) Petra Kvitová	(Estonia) Kaia Kanepi (France) Marion Bartoli (Russia) Maria Kirilenko (Russia) Maria Sharapova

=== October ===
Week	Tournament	Champions	Runners-up	Semifinalists	Quarterfinalists
3 Oct	China Open; Beijing, China; WTA Premier Mandatory; Hard – $4,500,000 – 60S/28D; Singles – Doubles	(Poland) Agnieszka Radwańska; 7–5, 0–6, 6–4	(Germany) Andrea Petkovic	(Italy) Flavia Pennetta (Romania) Monica Niculescu	(Denmark) Caroline Wozniacki (Serbia) Ana Ivanovic (Russia) Maria Kirilenko (Russia) Anastasia Pavlyuchenkova
3 Oct	China Open; Beijing, China; WTA Premier Mandatory; Hard – $4,500,000 – 60S/28D; Singles – Doubles	(Czech Republic) Květa Peschke (Slovenia) Katarina Srebotnik; 6–3, 6–4	(Argentina) Gisela Dulko (Italy) Flavia Pennetta	(Italy) Flavia Pennetta (Romania) Monica Niculescu	(Denmark) Caroline Wozniacki (Serbia) Ana Ivanovic (Russia) Maria Kirilenko (Russia) Anastasia Pavlyuchenkova
10 Oct	Generali Ladies Linz; Linz, Austria; WTA International; Hard (i) – $220,000 – 32S/16D; Singles – Doubles	(Czech Republic) Petra Kvitová; 6–4, 6–1	(Slovakia) Dominika Cibulková	(Serbia) Jelena Janković (Czech Republic) Lucie Šafářová	(Slovakia) Daniela Hantuchová (Russia) Evgeniya Rodina (Romania) Sorana Cîrstea (Australia) Anastasia Rodionova
10 Oct	Generali Ladies Linz; Linz, Austria; WTA International; Hard (i) – $220,000 – 32S/16D; Singles – Doubles	(New Zealand) Marina Erakovic (Russia) Elena Vesnina; 7–5, 6–1	(Germany) Julia Görges (Germany) Anna-Lena Grönefeld	(Serbia) Jelena Janković (Czech Republic) Lucie Šafářová	(Slovakia) Daniela Hantuchová (Russia) Evgeniya Rodina (Romania) Sorana Cîrstea (Australia) Anastasia Rodionova
10 Oct	HP Open; Osaka, Japan; WTA International; Hard – $220,000 – 32S/16D; Singles – Doubles	(France) Marion Bartoli; 6–3, 6–1	(Australia) Samantha Stosur	(China) Zheng Jie (Germany) Angelique Kerber	(South Africa) Chanelle Scheepers (Czech Republic) Petra Cetkovská (Thailand) Tamarine Tanasugarn (Japan) Ayumi Morita
10 Oct	HP Open; Osaka, Japan; WTA International; Hard – $220,000 – 32S/16D; Singles – Doubles	(Japan) Kimiko Date-Krumm (China) Zhang Shuai; 7–5, 3–6, [11–9]	(United States) Vania King (Kazakhstan) Yaroslava Shvedova	(China) Zheng Jie (Germany) Angelique Kerber	(South Africa) Chanelle Scheepers (Czech Republic) Petra Cetkovská (Thailand) Tamarine Tanasugarn (Japan) Ayumi Morita
17 Oct	Kremlin Cup; Moscow, Russia; WTA Premier; Hard (i) – $721,000 – 28S/16D; Singles – Doubles	(Slovakia) Dominika Cibulková; 3–6, 7–6^{(7–1)}, 7–5	(Estonia) Kaia Kanepi	(Russia) Elena Vesnina (Czech Republic) Lucie Šafářová	(Russia) Vera Zvonareva (France) Marion Bartoli (Russia) Svetlana Kuznetsova (Russia) Vera Dushevina
17 Oct	Kremlin Cup; Moscow, Russia; WTA Premier; Hard (i) – $721,000 – 28S/16D; Singles – Doubles	(United States) Vania King (Kazakhstan) Yaroslava Shvedova; 7–6^{(7–3)}, 6–3	(Australia) Anastasia Rodionova (Kazakhstan) Galina Voskoboeva	(Russia) Elena Vesnina (Czech Republic) Lucie Šafářová	(Russia) Vera Zvonareva (France) Marion Bartoli (Russia) Svetlana Kuznetsova (Russia) Vera Dushevina
17 Oct	BGL Luxembourg Open; Kockelscheuer, Luxembourg; WTA International; Hard (i) – $220,000 – 32S/16D; Singles – Doubles	(Belarus) Victoria Azarenka; 6–2, 6–2	(Romania) Monica Niculescu	(Germany) Julia Görges (United Kingdom) Anne Keothavong	(Czech Republic) Iveta Benešová (Latvia) Anastasija Sevastova (Czech Republic) Lucie Hradecká (Netherlands) Bibiane Schoofs
17 Oct	BGL Luxembourg Open; Kockelscheuer, Luxembourg; WTA International; Hard (i) – $220,000 – 32S/16D; Singles – Doubles	(Czech Republic) Iveta Benešová (Czech Republic) Barbora Záhlavová-Strýcová; 7–5, 6–3	(Czech Republic) Lucie Hradecká (Russia) Ekaterina Makarova	(Germany) Julia Görges (United Kingdom) Anne Keothavong	(Czech Republic) Iveta Benešová (Latvia) Anastasija Sevastova (Czech Republic) Lucie Hradecká (Netherlands) Bibiane Schoofs
24 Oct	WTA Tour Championships; Istanbul, Turkey; Year-end championships Hard(i) – $4,900,000 – 8S (RR)/4D; Singles – Doubles	(Czech Republic) Petra Kvitová; 7–5, 4–6, 6–3	(Belarus) Victoria Azarenka	(Australia) Samantha Stosur (Russia) Vera Zvonareva	Round robin Red group (Denmark) Caroline Wozniacki (Poland) Agnieszka Radwańska; White group (Russia) Maria Sharapova (China) Li Na (France) Marion Bartoli
24 Oct	WTA Tour Championships; Istanbul, Turkey; Year-end championships Hard(i) – $4,900,000 – 8S (RR)/4D; Singles – Doubles	(United States) Liezel Huber (United States) Lisa Raymond; 6–4, 6–4	(Czech Republic) Květa Peschke (Slovenia) Katarina Srebotnik	(Australia) Samantha Stosur (Russia) Vera Zvonareva	Round robin Red group (Denmark) Caroline Wozniacki (Poland) Agnieszka Radwańska; White group (Russia) Maria Sharapova (China) Li Na (France) Marion Bartoli
31 Oct	Commonwealth Bank; Tournament of Champions; Bali, Indonesia; Year-end championships Hard(i) – $600,000 – 8S; Singles	(Serbia) Ana Ivanovic; 6–3, 6–0	(Spain) Anabel Medina Garrigues	(Germany) Sabine Lisicki (Russia) Nadia Petrova	(France) Marion Bartoli (Slovakia) Daniela Hantuchová (Italy) Roberta Vinci (China) Peng Shuai
31 Oct	Fed Cup by BNP Paribas: Final; Moscow, Russia, Hard (i)	Czech Republic; 3–2	Russia		

== Statistical information ==
These tables present the number of singles (S), doubles (D), and mixed doubles (X) titles won by each player and each nation during the season, within all the tournament categories of the 2011 WTA Tour: the Grand Slam tournaments, the year-end championships (the WTA Tour Championships and the Tournament of Champions), the WTA Premier tournaments (Premier Mandatory, Premier 5, and regular Premier), and the WTA International tournaments.

1. total number of titles (a doubles title won by two players representing the same nation counts as only one win for the nation);
2. highest amount of highest category tournaments (for example, having a single Grand Slam gives preference over any kind of combination without a Grand Slam title);
3. a singles > doubles > mixed doubles hierarchy;
4. alphabetical order (by family names for players).

=== Key ===
Grand Slam tournaments
Year-end championships
WTA Premier Mandatory
WTA Premier 5
WTA Premier
WTA International
WTA International

=== Titles won by player ===
Total	Player	Grand Slam			Year-end		Premier Mandatory		Premier 5		Premier		International		Total		
Total	Player	S	D	X	S	D	S	D	S	D	S	D	S	D	S	D	X
7	Katarina Srebotnik (SLO)		●	●				●				● ● ●		●	0	6	1
6	Petra Kvitová (CZE)	●			●		●				●		● ●		6	0	0
6	Květa Peschke (CZE)		●					●				● ● ●		●	0	6	0
6	Caroline Wozniacki (DEN)						●		●		● ● ●		●		6	0	0
6	Barbora Záhlavová-Strýcová (CZE)											●	●	● ● ● ●	1	5	0
6	Roberta Vinci (ITA)												● ● ●	● ● ●	3	3	0
5	Liezel Huber (USA)		●			●				● ● ●					0	5	0
5	Iveta Benešová (CZE)			●								●		● ● ●	0	4	1
5	Victoria Azarenka (BLR)						●	●				●	● ●		3	2	0
4	Lisa Raymond (USA)		●			●				● ●					0	4	0
4	Agnieszka Radwańska (POL)						●	●	●		●				3	1	0
4	Anabel Medina Garrigues (ESP)												● ●	● ●	2	2	0
3	Andrea Hlaváčková (CZE)		●									●		●	0	3	0
3	Sania Mirza (IND)							●				●		●	0	3	0
3	Elena Vesnina (RUS)							●				●		●	0	3	0
3	Yaroslava Shvedova (KAZ)									●		●		●	0	3	0
3	María José Martínez Sánchez (ESP)									●			●	●	1	2	0
3	Sabine Lisicki (GER)											●	● ●		2	1	0
3	Olga Govortsova (BLR)											●		● ●	0	3	0
3	Galina Voskoboeva (KAZ)											●		● ●	0	3	0
3	Sara Errani (ITA)													● ● ●	0	3	0
2	(China) Li Na (CHN)	●									●				2	0	0
2	Samantha Stosur (AUS)	●										●			1	1	0
2	Gisela Dulko (ARG)		●										●		1	1	0
2	Lucie Hradecká (CZE)		●											●	0	2	0
2	Maria Sharapova (RUS)								● ●						2	0	0
2	Serena Williams (USA)								●		●				2	0	0
2	Vania King (USA)									●		●			0	2	0
2	Maria Kirilenko (RUS)							●				●			0	2	0
2	Daniela Hantuchová (SVK)							●					●		1	1	0
2	Marion Bartoli (FRA)										●		●		2	0	0
2	Vera Zvonareva (RUS)										●		●		2	0	0
2	Chuang Chia-jung (TPE)											●		●	0	2	0
2	Alberta Brianti (ITA)												●	●	1	1	0
2	Lourdes Domínguez Lino (ESP)												●	●	1	1	0
2	Anastasia Pavlyuchenkova (RUS)												●	●	1	1	0
2	Mariya Koryttseva (UKR)													● ●	0	2	0
2	Alla Kudryavtseva (RUS)													● ●	0	2	0
1	Kim Clijsters (BEL)	●													1	0	0
1	Flavia Pennetta (ITA)		●												0	1	0
1	Casey Dellacqua (AUS)			●											0	0	1
1	Melanie Oudin (USA)			●											0	0	1
1	Ana Ivanovic (SRB)				●										1	0	0
1	Peng Shuai (CHN)									●					0	1	0
1	Zheng Jie (CHN)									●					0	1	0
1	Dominika Cibulková (SVK)										●				1	0	0
1	Julia Görges (GER)										●				1	0	0
1	Bethanie Mattek-Sands (USA)											●			0	1	0
1	Meghann Shaughnessy (USA)											●			0	1	0
1	Gréta Arn (HUN)												●		1	0	0
1	Jelena Dokić (AUS)												●		1	0	0
1	Jarmila Gajdošová (AUS)												●		1	0	0
1	Polona Hercog (SLO)												●		1	0	0
1	Ksenia Pervak (RUS)												●		1	0	0
1	Andrea Petkovic (GER)												●		1	0	0
1	Nadia Petrova (RUS)												●		1	0	0
1	Magdaléna Rybáriková (SVK)												●		1	0	0
1	Chanelle Scheepers (RSA)												●		1	0	0
1	Akgul Amanmuradova (UZB)													●	0	1	0
1	Eva Birnerová (CZE)													●	0	1	0
1	Sorana Cîrstea (ROM)													●	0	1	0
1	Eleni Daniilidou (GRE)													●	0	1	0
1	Kimiko Date-Krumm (JPN)													●	0	1	0
1	Vitalia Diatchenko (RUS)													●	0	1	0
1	Marina Erakovic (NZL)													●	0	1	0
1	Edina Gallovits-Hall (ROM)													●	0	1	0
1	Johanna Larsson (SWE)													●	0	1	0
1	Nuria Llagostera Vives (ESP)													●	0	1	0
1	Ioana Raluca Olaru (ROM)													●	0	1	0
1	Arantxa Parra Santonja (ESP)													●	0	1	0
1	Tatiana Poutchek (BLR)													●	0	1	0
1	Alicja Rosolska (POL)													●	0	1	0
1	Dinara Safina (RUS)													●	0	1	0
1	Vladimíra Uhlířová (CZE)													●	0	1	0
1	Renata Voráčová (CZE)													●	0	1	0
1	Jasmin Wöhr (GER)													●	0	1	0
1	Klára Zakopalová (CZE)													●	0	1	0
1	Zhang Shuai (CHN)													●	0	1	0
1	Zheng Saisai (CHN)													●	0	1	0

=== Titles won by nation ===
Total	Nation	Grand Slam			Year-end		Premier Mandatory		Premier 5		Premier		International		Total		
Total	Nation	S	D	X	S	D	S	D	S	D	S	D	S	D	S	D	X
24	Czech Republic (CZE)	1	2	1	1		1	1			1	4	3	8	7	16	1
17	Russia (RUS)							2	2		1	2	4	6	7	10	0
9	United States (USA)		1	1		1			1	3	1	1			2	6	1
9	Belarus (BLR)						1	1				2	2	3	3	6	0
8	Slovenia (SLO)		1	1				1				3	1	1	1	6	1
8	Italy (ITA)		1										4	3	4	4	0
6	Denmark (DEN)						1		1		3		1		6	0	0
6	Germany (GER)										1	1	3	1	4	2	0
6	Kazakhstan (KAZ)									1		2		3	0	6	0
5	Australia (AUS)	1		1							1	1	2		3	1	1
5	China (CHN)	1								1	1			2	2	3	0
5	Poland (POL)						1	1	1		1			1	3	2	0
4	Slovakia (SVK)							1			1		2		3	1	0
3	India (IND)							1				1		1	0	3	0
3	Romania (ROM)													3	0	3	0
2	Argentina (ARG)		1										1		1	1	0
2	France (FRA)										1		1		2	0	0
2	Ukraine (UKR)													2	0	2	0
1	Belgium (BEL)	1													1	0	0
1	Serbia (SRB)				1										0	0	0
1	Hungary (HUN)												1		1	0	0
1	Chinese Taipei (TPE)													1	0	1	0
1	Greece (GRE)													1	0	1	0
1	Japan (JPN)													1	0	1	0
1	New Zealand (NZL)													1	0	1	0
1	Uzbekistan (UZB)													1	0	1	0

=== Titles information ===
The following players won their first title in singles (S), doubles (D) or mixed doubles (X):

- (Czech Republic) Iveta Benešová – Wimbledon (X)
- (Italy) Alberta Brianti – Fes (S)
- (Slovakia) Dominika Cibulková – Moscow (S)
- (Australia) Casey Dellacqua – French Open (X)
- (Russia) Vitalia Diatchenko – Tashkent (D)
- (South Africa) Natalie Grandin – Seoul (D)
- (Slovenia) Polona Hercog – Båstad (S)
- (Germany) Sabine Lisicki – Stuttgart (D)
- (United States) Melanie Oudin – US Open (X)
- (Russia) Ksenia Pervak – Tashkent (S)
- (South Africa) Chanelle Scheepers – Guangzhou (S)
- (Kazakhstan) Galina Voskoboeva – Kuala Lumpur (D)
- (Czech Republic) Barbora Záhlavová-Strýcová – Quebec City (S)
- (China) Zhang Shuai – Osaka (D)
- (China) Zheng Saisai – Guangzhou (D)

The following players completed a successful title defence in singles (S), doubles (D) or mixed doubles (X):

- (Czech Republic) Iveta Benešová – Monterrey (D)
- (Romania) Edina Gallovits-Hall – Bogotá (D)
- (Czech Republic) Lucie Hradecká – Bad Gastein (D)
- (Serbia) Ana Ivanovic – Bali (S)
- (Spain) María José Martínez Sánchez – Dubai (D)
- (Russia) Anastasia Pavlyuchenkova – Monterrey (S)
- (Czech Republic) Květa Peschke – Doha (D)
- (Denmark) Caroline Wozniacki – Copenhagen (S), New Haven (S)
- (Czech Republic) Barbora Záhlavová-Strýcová – Monterrey (D)

== Titles information ==
The following players won their first title in singles (S), doubles (D) or mixed doubles (X):

- (Czech Republic) Iveta Benešová – Wimbledon (X)
- (Italy) Alberta Brianti – Fes (S)
- (Slovakia) Dominika Cibulková – Moscow (S)
- (Australia) Casey Dellacqua – French Open (X)
- (Russia) Vitalia Diatchenko – Tashkent (D)
- (South Africa) Natalie Grandin – Seoul (D)
- (Slovenia) Polona Hercog – Båstad (S)
- (Germany) Sabine Lisicki – Stuttgart (D)
- (United States) Melanie Oudin – US Open (X)
- (Russia) Ksenia Pervak – Tashkent (S)
- (South Africa) Chanelle Scheepers – Guangzhou (S)
- (Kazakhstan) Galina Voskoboeva – Kuala Lumpur (D)
- (Czech Republic) Barbora Záhlavová-Strýcová – Quebec City (S)
- (China) Zhang Shuai – Osaka (D)
- (China) Zheng Saisai – Guangzhou (D)

The following players completed a successful title defence in singles (S), doubles (D) or mixed doubles (X):

- (Czech Republic) Iveta Benešová – Monterrey (D)
- (Romania) Edina Gallovits-Hall – Bogotá (D)
- (Czech Republic) Lucie Hradecká – Bad Gastein (D)
- (Serbia) Ana Ivanovic – Bali (S)
- (Spain) María José Martínez Sánchez – Dubai (D)
- (Russia) Anastasia Pavlyuchenkova – Monterrey (S)
- (Czech Republic) Květa Peschke – Doha (D)
- (Denmark) Caroline Wozniacki – Copenhagen (S), New Haven (S)
- (Czech Republic) Barbora Záhlavová-Strýcová – Monterrey (D)

== Rankings ==
The Race to the Championships determines the players in the WTA Tour Championships in October. The WTA rankings are based on tournaments of the latest 52 weeks.

=== Singles ===
The following is the 2011 top 20 in the Race to the Championships and the top 20 ranked players in the world. Premier Mandatory Events are counted for players in the top 10, even if they did not compete, unless there is an injury excuse. Gold backgrounds indicate players that qualified for the WTA Tour Championships. Blue backgrounds indicate players that became alternates at the WTA Tour Championships.

Race Singles
Rk	Player	Points	Tour
1	Caroline Wozniacki (DEN)	7,395	21
2	Maria Sharapova (RUS)	6,370	14
3	Petra Kvitová (CZE)	5,970	18
4	Victoria Azarenka (BLR)	5,750	20
5	Li Na (CHN)	5,351	17
6	Vera Zvonareva (RUS)	5,190	21
7	Samantha Stosur (AUS)	5,115	20
8	Agnieszka Radwańska (POL)	4,940	19
9	Marion Bartoli (FRA)	4,610	27
10	Andrea Petkovic (GER)	4,580	18
11	Francesca Schiavone (ITA)	3,900	22
12	Serena Williams (USA)	3,180	13(6)
13	Kim Clijsters (BEL)	3,161	14(8)
14	Jelena Janković (SRB)	3,115	22
15	Anastasia Pavlyuchenkova (RUS)	2,865	22
16	Peng Shuai (CHN)	2,800	22
17	Dominika Cibulková (SVK)	2,755	22
18	Sabine Lisicki (GER)	2,724	20
19	Svetlana Kuznetsova (RUS)	2,606	19
20	Flavia Pennetta (ITA)	2,490	22

WTA Singles Year-End Rankings
#	Player	Points	#Trn	'10 Rk	High	Low	'10→'11
1	Caroline Wozniacki (DEN)	7,485	22	1	1	2	=
2	Petra Kvitová (CZE)	7,370	19	34	2	34	▲32
3	Victoria Azarenka (BLR)	6,520	21	10	3	10	▲7
4	Maria Sharapova (RUS)	6,510	15	18	2	18	▲14
5	Li Na (CHN)	5,720	18	11	4	11	▲6
6	Samantha Stosur (AUS)	5,585	21	6	4	11	=
7	Vera Zvonareva (RUS)	5,435	22	2	2	7	▼5
8	Agnieszka Radwańska (POL)	5,250	20	14	8	14	▲6
9	Marion Bartoli (FRA)	4,710	29	16	9	18	▲7
10	Andrea Petkovic (GER)	4,580	18	32	9	33	▲22
11	Francesca Schiavone (ITA)	3,900	22	7	4	12	▼4
12	Serena Williams (USA)	3,180	13	4	4	175	▼8
13	Kim Clijsters (BEL)	3,161	14	3	1	13	▼10
14	Jelena Janković (SRB)	3,115	22	8	6	15	▼6
15	Sabine Lisicki (GER)	2,879	21	179	15	218	▲164
16	Anastasia Pavlyuchenkova (RUS)	2,865	22	21	13	21	▲5
17	Peng Shuai (CHN)	2,800	23	72	14	72	▲55
18	Dominika Cibulková (SVK)	2,755	22	31	15	32	▲13
19	Svetlana Kuznetsova (RUS)	2,606	19	27	12	27	▲8
20	Flavia Pennetta (ITA)	2,490	22	24	15	27	▲4

==== Number 1 ranking ====
Holder	Date gained	Date forfeited
Caroline Wozniacki (DEN)	Year-End 2010	13 February 2011
Kim Clijsters (BEL)	14 February 2011	20 February 2011
Caroline Wozniacki (DEN)	21 February 2011	Year-End 2011

=== Doubles ===
The following is the 2011 top 20 in the Race to the Championships – Doubles and the top 20 individual ranked doubles players. Gold backgrounds indicate teams that have qualified for WTA Tour Championships.

Race Doubles
Rk	Team	Points	Tour
1	Květa Peschke (CZE); Katarina Srebotnik (SLO)	9,411	20
2	Liezel Huber (USA); Lisa Raymond (USA)	6,773	15
3	Vania King (USA); Yaroslava Shvedova (KAZ)	6,200	12
4	Gisela Dulko (ARG); Flavia Pennetta (ITA)	5,776	14
5	Victoria Azarenka (BLR); Maria Kirilenko (RUS)	5,490	10
6	Sania Mirza (IND); Elena Vesnina (RUS)	4,788	12
7	Natalie Grandin (RSA); Vladimíra Uhlířová (CZE)	3,866	31
8	Roberta Vinci (ITA); Sara Errani (ITA)	3,541	21
9	Bethanie Mattek-Sands (USA); Meghann Shaughnessy (USA)	3,351	12
10	Daniela Hantuchová (SVK); Agnieszka Radwańska (POL)	3,241	10

WTA Doubles Year-End Rankings
#	Player	Points	Change
1	Liezel Huber (USA)	9,970	▲2
2	Květa Peschke (CZE)	8,680	▲3
=	Katarina Srebotnik (SLO)	8,680	▲4
4	Lisa Raymond (USA)	8,295	▲5
5	Yaroslava Shvedova (KAZ)	6,805	▲1
6	Vania King (USA)	6,725	▼3
7	Maria Kirilenko (RUS)	6,495	▲7
8	Flavia Pennetta (ITA)	6,135	▼6
9	Gisela Dulko (ARG)	6,135	▼8
10	Elena Vesnina (RUS)	5,225	▲13
11	Sania Mirza (IND)	5,205	▲50
12	Victoria Azarenka (BLR)	5,159	▲32
13	Nadia Petrova (RUS)	4,860	▼3
14	Andrea Hlaváčková (CZE)	4,205	▲31
15	Lucie Hradecká (CZE)	4,175	▲23
16	Agnieszka Radwańska (POL)	3,521	▲11
17	Bethanie Mattek-Sands (USA)	3,490	=
18	Daniela Hantuchová (SVK)	3,361	▲75
19	Meghann Shaughnessy (USA)	3,350	▲15
20	Zheng Jie (CHN)	3,235	▼4

==== Number 1 ranking ====
Holder	Date gained	Date forfeited
Gisela Dulko (ARG)	Year-End 2010	
Gisela Dulko (ARG); Flavia Pennetta (ITA)	28 February 2011	17 April 2011
Flavia Pennetta (ITA)		3 July 2011
Květa Peschke (CZE); Katarina Srebotnik (SLO)	4 July 2011	11 September 2011
Liezel Huber (USA)	12 September 2011	Year-End 2011

== WTA Prize money Leaders ==
The top-16 players earned over $1,000,000.

As of 7 November 2011

#	Country	Player	Singles	Doubles	Mixed	Bonus Pool	Year-to-date
1	Czech Republic	Petra Kvitová	$5,131,009	$12,476	$2,458	$0	$5,145,943
2	Denmark	Caroline Wozniacki	$3,064,756	$0	$825	$1,000,000	$4,065,581
3	Belarus	Victoria Azarenka	$3,207,489	$373,543	$0	$225,000	$3,771,032
4	China	Li Na	$3,484,139	$0	$0	$225,000	$3,709,139
5	Australia	Samantha Stosur	$2,934,333	$145,780	$1,040	$400,000	$3,476,153
6	Russia	Maria Sharapova	$2,899,148	$0	$0	$0	$2,899,148
7	Russia	Vera Zvonareva	$1,907,681	$45,737	$0	$725,000	$2,673,018
8	Poland	Agnieszka Radwańska	$2,202,672	$253,846	$0	$0	$2,456,518
9	Belgium	Kim Clijsters	$2,235,741	$0	$0	$0	$2,325,741
10	United States	Serena Williams	$1,978,930	$0	$0	$0	$1,978,930

== Statistics leaders ==
Service and return statistical leaders at the conclusion of the year, according to the WTA.

Aces
	player	Aces	Matches
1	(France) Marion Bartoli	270	83
2	(Australia) Jarmila Gajdošová	260	51
3	(Germany) Sabine Lisicki	245	46
4	(Germany) Julia Görges	245	60
5	(Czech Republic) Lucie Šafářová	243	57
6	(Czech Republic) Petra Kvitová	241	61
7	(Czech Republic) Lucie Hradecká	237	36
8	(Russia) Vera Zvonareva	235	75
9	(Canada) Rebecca Marino	214	33
10	(Australia) Samantha Stosur	213	66

Service games won
	player	%	Matches
1	(United States) Serena Williams	85.4	25
2	(Australia) Samantha Stosur	79.7	66
3	(Czech Republic) Petra Kvitová	76.6	51
4	(Germany) Sabine Lisicki	75.6	46
5	(Czech Republic) Lucie Šafářová	74.9	57
6	(Denmark) Caroline Wozniacki	74.7	80
7	(Serbia) Ana Ivanovic	74.5	50
8	(Germany) Julia Görges	73.6	60
9	(Slovakia) Daniela Hantuchová	73.0	66
10	(Slovakia) Magdaléna Rybáriková	72.9	28

Break points saved
	player	%	Matches
1	(United States) Serena Williams	67.5	25
2	(Czech Republic) Lucie Šafářová	63.7	57
3	(Australia) Samantha Stosur	63.4	66
4	(Slovakia) Daniela Hantuchová	63.0	66
5	(Slovakia) Magdaléna Rybáriková	62.4	28
6	(Serbia) Ana Ivanovic	61.0	50
7	(Czech Republic) Petra Kvitová	60.0	61
8	(Belgium) Kim Clijsters	59.7	28
9	(Estonia) Kaia Kanepi	59.2	35
10	(United Kingdom) Heather Watson	58.7	21

First serve percentage
	player	%	Matches
1	(Italy) Sara Errani	76.8	56
2	(Romania) Monica Niculescu	74.7	36
3	(China) Zheng Jie	74.0	41
4	(Georgia (country)) Anna Tatishvili	71.5	21
5	(China) Zhang Shuai	70.4	30
6	(Belarus) Victoria Azarenka	70.4	72
7	(Germany) Andrea Petkovic	69.9	67
8	(Denmark) Caroline Wozniacki	69.5	80
9	(China) Peng Shuai	69.1	69
10	(China) Li Na	69.1	49

First service points won
	player	%	Matches
1	(United States) Serena Williams	76.7	25
2	(Germany) Sabine Lisicki	72.9	46
3	(Czech Republic) Lucie Hradecká	71.9	36
4	(Serbia) Ana Ivanovic	71.3	50
5	(Australia) Jarmila Gajdošová	70.2	51
6	(Australia) Samantha Stosur	69.9	66
7	(Czech Republic) Lucie Šafářová	69.6	57
8	(Slovakia) Magdaléna Rybáriková	69.3	28
9	(Germany) Julia Görges	69.0	60
10	(Russia) Vera Zvonareva	68.9	75

Second serve points won
	player	%	Matches
1	(United States) Serena Williams	52.9	25
2	(Australia) Samantha Stosur	52.2	66
3	(Czech Republic) Petra Kvitová	50.2	61
4	(Denmark) Caroline Wozniacki	50.0	80
5	(Poland) Agnieszka Radwańska	49.3	64
6	(Germany) Andrea Petkovic	49.1	67
7	(Slovakia) Daniela Hantuchová	48.7	66
8	(Spain) Anabel Medina Garrigues	48.7	54
9	(Canada) Rebecca Marino	48.5	33
10	(Spain) Laura Pous Tió	48.3	28

Points won returning 1st service
	player	%	Matches
1	(Russia) Maria Sharapova	43.8	56
2	(Romania) Monica Niculescu	43.4	36
3	(Czech Republic) Klára Zakopalová	43.1	54
4	(Poland) Urszula Radwańska	42.9	21
5	(Belgium) Kim Clijsters	42.6	28
6	(Spain) Lourdes Domínguez Lino	42.3	31
7	(Spain) Anabel Medina Garrigues	42.1	54
8	(Belarus) Victoria Azarenka	42.0	72
9	(Spain) Carla Suárez Navarro	41.9	27
10	(Denmark) Caroline Wozniacki	41.7	80

Break points converted
	player	%	Matches
1	(Spain) Anabel Medina Garrigues	54.9	54
2	(Russia) Maria Sharapova	54.8	56
3	(Ukraine) Kateryna Bondarenko	54.4	24
4	(Czech Republic) Klára Zakopalová	52.4	54
5	(Romania) Monica Niculescu	52.2	36
6	(France) Alizé Cornet	51.8	27
7	(Russia) Alisa Kleybanova	51.7	26
8	(United States) Melanie Oudin	51.5	27
9	(Poland) Agnieszka Radwańska	51.1	64
10	(Spain) Lourdes Domínguez Lino	51.0	31

Return games won
	player	%	Matches
1	(Russia) Maria Sharapova	49.7	56
2	(Belarus) Victoria Azarenka	49.0	72
3	(Romania) Monica Niculescu	48.5	36
4	(Belgium) Kim Clijsters	47.9	28
5	(Spain) Anabel Medina Garrigues	46.0	54
6	(Denmark) Caroline Wozniacki	45.9	80
7	(Czech Republic) Klára Zakopalová	45.5	54
8	(Poland) Agnieszka Radwańska	45.2	64
9	(France) Marion Bartoli	44.7	83
10	(Serbia) Jelena Janković	44.4	59

== Points distribution ==
Category	W	F	SF	QF	R16	R32	R64	R128	Q	Q3	Q2	Q1
Grand Slam (S)	2000	1400	900	500	280	160	100	5	60	50	40	2
Grand Slam (D)	2000	1400	900	500	280	160	5	–	48	–	–	–
WTA Championships (S)	+450	+360	(230 for each win, 70 for each loss)					–	–	–	–	–
WTA Championships (D)	1500	1050	690	–	–	–	–	–	–	–	–	–
WTA Premier Mandatory (96S)	1000	700	450	250	140	80	50	5	30	–	20	1
WTA Premier Mandatory (64S)	1000	700	450	250	140	80	5	–	30	–	20	1
WTA Premier Mandatory (28/32D)	1000	700	450	250	140	5	–	–	–	–	–	–
WTA Premier 5 (56S)	900	620	395	225	125	70	1	–	30	–	20	1
WTA Premier 5 (28D)	900	620	395	225	125	1	–	–	–	–	–	–
WTA Premier (56S)	470	320	200	120	60	40	1	–	12	–	8	1
WTA Premier (32S)	470	320	200	120	60	1	–	–	20	12	8	1
WTA Premier (16D)	470	320	200	120	1	–	–	–	–	–	–	–
Tournament of Champions	375	255	180 (3rd); 165 (4th)	75	–	–	–	–	–	–	–	–
WTA International (56S)	280	200	130	70	30	15	1	–	10	–	6	1
WTA International (32S)	280	200	130	70	30	1	–	–	16	10	6	1
WTA International (16D)	280	200	130	70	1	–	–	–	–	–	–	–

== Retirements ==
Following are notable players who have announced they will retire from the WTA Tour during the 2011 season:

- (Estonia) Maret Ani (born 31 January 1982 in Tallinn), turned professional in 1997 with a high singles ranking career of No. 63 15 May 2006 and a high doubles ranking career of No. 39 5 April 2004.
- (Austria) Sybille Bammer (born 27 April 1980 in Linz), a former world no. 19, and US Open quarter-finalist. Bammer announced her retirement after defeat to Monica Niculescu in the first round of Wimbledon, but briefly returned two weeks later to play her home-country tournament at 2011 Gastein Ladies, where she lost in the second round to Yvonne Meusburger 6–2, 6–1.
- (Ukraine) Alona Bondarenko (born 13 August 1984 in Kryvyi Rih) She won the Australian Open Women's doubles Title, partnering with her younger sister Kateryna. They defeated the pairing Shahar Pe'er and Victoria Azarenka. Bondarenko played her last match in 2011.
- (France) Stéphanie Cohen-Aloro (born 18 March 1983, in Paris) has reached a career high of 61 in singles and 54 in doubles. She played her final match at the 2011 Open GDF Suez where she was a lucky loser, losing to Bethanie Mattek-Sands 7–5, 6–3.
- (South Africa) Surina De Beer (born 28 June 1978 in Pretoria) De Beer has won 10 singles and 36 doubles titles on the ITF tour in her career. On 6 July 1998, she reached her best singles ranking of world number 116. On 25 September 2000, she peaked at world number 49 in the doubles rankings.
- (Ukraine) Yuliana Fedak (born 8 June 1983 in Nova Kakhovka), turned professional in 1998 with a high singles ranking career of No 63 18 September 2006 and a high doubles ranking career of No. 34 15 January 2007.
- (Italy) Tathiana Garbin (born 30 June 1977 in Mestre) The winner of one singles and eleven doubles WTA Tour titles,[3] she reached her highest singles ranking World No. 22 on 21 May 2007, and her highest doubles ranking World No. 25 on 27 August 2001.
- (Belgium) Justine Henin (born 1 June 1982 in Liège), a former world No. 1 in singles and holder of 43 WTA titles including: 7 Grand Slams 2 Year End Championships and the Olympic gold medal in the 2004 games, as well as two doubles titles. Henin first retired in 2008 as the world No. 1, but later came out of retirement in 2010. On her return to tour she won two WTA titles; the 2010 Porsche Tennis Grand Prix and the 2010 UNICEF Open. She also reached the final of the 2010 Brisbane International and the final of the 2010 Australian Open. She played her final match against Svetlana Kuznetsova in the third round of the 2011 Australian Open, losing 4–6, 6–7(8). She retired for the second time due to the recurrence of an elbow injury received in the 2010 Wimbledon Championships. The injury had initially caused her to end her 2010 season prematurely.
- (Australia) Alicia Molik (born 27 January 1981 in Adelaide), turned professional in 1996 with a high singles ranking career of No. 8 on 28 February 2005 and a high doubles ranking career of No. 6 on 6 June 2005. She reached one Grand Slam quarterfinal at the 2005 Australian Open and won two Doubles Slams at the 2005 Australian Open Doubles and 2007 French Open Doubles. Molik also won the bronze medal in the 2004 Summer Olympics defeating Anastasia Myskina. She played her final match at the 2011 Australian Open where she was a wild card, losing to Nadia Petrova in the second round, decided to retire her tennis career.
- (Australia) Trudi Musgrave (born 10 September 1977 in Newcastle), turned professional in 1994 with a high singles ranking career of No 207 on 20 December 2006 and a high doubles ranking career of No. 62 26 May 2003.
- (Germany) Martina Müller (born 11 October 1982 in Hanover), turned professional in 1999 with a high singles ranking career of No 33 2 April 2007 and a high doubles ranking career of No. 47 25 February 2008.
- (United States) Lilia Osterloh (born 7 April 1978 in Columbus), turned professional in 1997 with a high singles ranking career of No 41 23 April 2001 and a high doubles ranking career of No. 77 23 August 1999.
- (Italy) Mara Santangelo (born 28 June 1981 in Latina, Lazio), who turned professional in 2003 and has reached a career high ranking of No. 27 on 9 July 2007. In doubles she reached a career-high ranking of No. 5 on 10 September 2007. She has won 2007 French Open in doubles title.
- (Switzerland) Patty Schnyder (born 14 December 1978 in Basel), a former world no. 7, six time Grand Slam quarter finalist, semi finalist at the 2004 Australian Open and three time participant at the Year End Championships. Schnyder retired aged 32 at the 2011 French Open, after a 6–1, 6–3 first round defeat by Sorana Cîrstea.
- (Germany) Julia Schruff (born 16 August 1982 in Augsburg), turned professional in 1992 with a high singles ranking career of No 52 17 April 2006 and a high doubles ranking career of No. 99 2 October 2006.
- (Tunisia) Selima Sfar (born 8 July 1977 in Sidi Bou Said), turned professional in 1999 with a high singles ranking career of No 75 16 July 2001 and a high doubles ranking career of No. 47 28 July 2008.
- (Australia) Rennae Stubbs (born 26 March 1971 in Sydney) was a former world no. 1 in doubles and has won 60 doubles titles, 4 of which are Slams at the 2000 Australian Open, 2001 and 2004 Wimbledon, and the 2001 US Open. She also won 2 mixed doubles Slams at the 2000 Australian Open and 2001 US Open. She played her final match at the 2011 Fed Cup tie against Italy partnering Anastasia Rodionova but end up losing in three sets.
- (Croatia) Karolina Šprem (born 25 October 1984 Varaždin), turned professional in 2001 with a high singles ranking career of No 17 11 October 2004. Šprem's career highlight came at Wimbledon 2004, where she was a quarterfinalist.
- (United Kingdom) Katie O'Brien (born 2 May 1986 Beverley), turned professional in 1999 with a high singles ranking career of No 84 1 February 2010. On 12 August 2011 she announced her retirement at the age 25.
- (India) Shikha Uberoi (born 5 April 1983, in Bombay), turned professional in 2003 with a high singles ranking career of No 122 29 August 2005 and. 2011 she announced retired from tennis.
- (Ukraine) Julia Vakulenko (born 10 July 1983 in Yalta), turned professional in 1998 with a high singles ranking career of No 32 19 November 2007 and high doubles ranking career of No. 87 19 February 2007.

== Comebacks ==
Following are notable players that came back after retirements during the 2011 WTA Tour season:

- (Slovakia) Janette Husárová (born 4 June 1974 in Bratislava), who turned professional in 1991 and has reached a career high ranking of No. 31 on 13 January 2003 in singles and in doubles; she was a former world no. 3. She has won 23 WTA Tour doubles including 1 WTA Championships. She returned from her 2010 retirement, partnering Simona Halep at the BLG Luxembourg Open.

== Awards ==
The winners of the 2011 WTA Awards were announced on 14 November 2011.

- Player of the Year – (Czech Republic) Petra Kvitová
- Doubles Team of the Year – (Czech Republic) Květa Peschke & (Slovenia) Katarina Srebotnik
- Most Improved Player – (Czech Republic) Petra Kvitová
- Comeback Player of the Year – (Germany) Sabine Lisicki
- Newcomer of the Year – (Romania) Irina-Camelia Begu
- Karen Krantzcke Sportsmanship Award – (Czech Republic) Petra Kvitová
- Player Service Award – (Italy) Francesca Schiavone
- Fan Favorite Singles Player – (Poland) Agnieszka Radwańska
- Fan Favorite Doubles Team – (Belarus) Victoria Azarenka & (Russia) Maria Kirilenko
- Fan Favorite Breakthrough Player – (Czech Republic) Petra Kvitová
- Favorite Premier Tournament – (Germany) Porsche Tennis Grand Prix (Stuttgart)
- Favorite International Tournament – (Mexico) Abierto Mexicano Telcel (Acapulco)

== See also ==
- 2011 ATP World Tour
- 2011 ATP Challenger Tour
- 2011 ITF Men's Circuit
- 2011 ITF Women's Circuit
- Women's Tennis Association
- International Tennis Federation
