= 2011 Qatar Ladies Open =

- Date: 21–26 February
- Edition: 9th
- Location: Doha, Qatar
- Venue: Khalifa International Tennis and Squash Complex

Champions

Singles
- (Russia) Vera Zvonareva

Doubles
- (Czech Republic) Květa Peschke / (Slovenia) Katarina Srebotnik
| ← 2008 · | Qatar Ladies Open | · 2012 → |

The 2011 Qatar Ladies Open was a professional women's tennis tournament played on hard courts. It was the ninth edition of the tournament and the first since 2008 which was part of the 2011 WTA Tour. It took place in Doha, Qatar between 21 and 26 February 2011.

== Finals ==
=== Singles ===
(Russia) Vera Zvonareva defeated (Denmark) Caroline Wozniacki, 6–4, 6–4

- It was Zvonareva's 1st title of the year and 11th of her career. It was her 1st career Premier event title.

=== Doubles ===
(Czech Republic) Květa Peschke / (Slovenia) Katarina Srebotnik defeated (United States) Liezel Huber / (Russia) Nadia Petrova, 7–5, 6–7^{(2–7)}, [10–8]

== WTA entrants ==
=== Seeds ===
| Country | Player | Rank^{1} | Seed |
|---|---|---|---|
| DEN | Caroline Wozniacki | 2 | 1 |
| RUS | Vera Zvonareva | 3 | 2 |
| ITA | Francesca Schiavone | 4 | 3 |
| CHN | Li Na | 7 | 4 |
| SRB | Jelena Janković | 8 | 5 |
| BLR | Victoria Azarenka | 9 | 6 |
| POL | Agnieszka Radwańska | 10 | 7 |
| ISR | Shahar Pe'er | 11 | 8 |

- Rankings are as of February 14, 2011.

=== Other entrants ===
The following players received wildcards into the singles main draw:

- (Oman) Fatma Al-Nabhani
- (India) Sania Mirza

The following players received entry from the qualifying draw:

- (Russia) Vera Dushevina
- (Australia) Jarmila Groth
- (Serbia) Bojana Jovanovski
- (China) Peng Shuai

The following player received entry as a lucky loser into the singles main draw:

- (Switzerland) Timea Bacsinszky
- (Czech Republic) Klára Zakopalová
