= 2011 Mercury Insurance Open – Doubles =

Doubles
- 2011 Mercury Insurance Open

Final
- Champions: (Czech Republic) Květa Peschke (Slovenia) Katarina Srebotnik
- Runners-up: (United States) Raquel Kops-Jones (United States) Abigail Spears
- Score: 6–0, 6–2

Details
- Draw: 16
- Seeds: 4

Events
Singles	Doubles
- San Diego Open

Maria Kirilenko and Zheng Jie were the defending champions, but only Zheng chose to participate with Elena Bovina. They lost in the quarterfinals to Vera Dushevina and Lucie Hradecká.
Květa Peschke and Katarina Srebotnik won the title, defeating Raquel Kops-Jones and Abigail Spears 6–0, 6–2 in the final.

== Seeds ==
1. (Czech Republic) Květa Peschke / (Slovenia) Katarina Srebotnik (champions)
2. (Argentina) Gisela Dulko / (Italy) Flavia Pennetta (quarterfinals)
3. (United States) Liezel Huber / (United States) Lisa Raymond (first round)
4. (India) Sania Mirza / (Russia) Elena Vesnina (first round, retired due to Vesnina's blisters)

== Draw ==
Key

- Q = Qualifier
- WC = Wild card
- LL = Lucky loser
- Alt = Alternate
- ITF = ITF entry
- PR = Protected ranking
- SR = Special ranking
- SE = Special exempt
- JE = Junior exempt
- JR = Junior Accelerator Programme entrant
- CO = College Accelerator Programme entrant
- NG = Next Gen Accelerator Program entrant
- w/o = Walkover
- r = Retired
- d = Defaulted

=== Draw ===
First round
1	(Czech Republic) K Peschke (Slovenia) K Srebotnik	6	7^{7}
(Germany) J Görges (Czech Republic) B Záhlavová-Strýcová	1	6^{5}
(Chinese Taipei) C-j Chuang (Belarus) O Govortsova	6^{4}	4
Alt	(Japan) K Date-Krumm (China) S Zhang	7^{7}	6
3	(United States) L Huber (United States) L Raymond	3	1
(Italy) S Errani (Italy) R Vinci	6	6
(Australia) A Rodionova (Ukraine) O Savchuk	6	6
(New Zealand) M Erakovic (Australia) J Gajdošová	2	1
(Russia) V Dushevina (Czech Republic) L Hradecká	7^{7}	6
(South Africa) N Grandin (Czech Republic) V Uhlířová	6^{4}	3
(Russia) E Bovina (China) J Zheng	5
4	(India) S Mirza (Russia) E Vesnina	2	r
(United States) R Kops-Jones (United States) A Spears	6	6
WC	(United States) A Glatch (United States) C Vandeweghe	3	2
(Poland) K Jans-Ignacik (Poland) A Rosolska	3	0
2	(Argentina) G Dulko (Italy) F Pennetta	6	6

Quarterfinals
1	(Czech Republic) K Peschke (Slovenia) K Srebotnik	6	6
Alt	(Japan) K Date-Krumm (China) S Zhang	4	2
(Italy) S Errani (Italy) R Vinci	7	6
(Australia) A Rodionova (Ukraine) O Savchuk	5	4
(Russia) V Dushevina (Czech Republic) L Hradecká	6	6
(Russia) E Bovina (China) J Zheng	3	3
(United States) R Kops-Jones (United States) A Spears	7	2	[12]
2	(Argentina) G Dulko (Italy) F Pennetta	5	6	[10]

Semifinals
1	(Czech Republic) K Peschke (Slovenia) K Srebotnik	3	6	[10]
(Italy) S Errani (Italy) R Vinci	6	4	[7]
(Russia) V Dushevina (Czech Republic) L Hradecká	6^{5}	4
(United States) R Kops-Jones (United States) A Spears	7	6

Final
1	(Czech Republic) K Peschke (Slovenia) K Srebotnik	6	6
(United States) R Kops-Jones (United States) A Spears	0	2
