= 2011 Internationaux de Strasbourg – Doubles =

Doubles
- 2011 Internationaux de Strasbourg

Final
- Champion: (Uzbekistan) Akgul Amanmuradova (Chinese Taipei) Chuang Chia-jung
- Runner-up: (South Africa) Natalie Grandin (Czech Republic) Vladimíra Uhlířová
- Score: 6–4, 5–7, [10–2]

Events
Singles	Doubles
- Internationaux de Strasbourg

Alizé Cornet and Vania King were the defending champions; however, King decided not to participate.
Cornet plays alongside Anna-Lena Grönefeld but were eliminated in the quarterfinals.

No.4 seeds Akgul Amanmuradova and Chuang Chia-jung defeated No.2 seeds Natalie Grandin and Vladimíra Uhlířová in the final 6–4, 5–7, [10–2] to win the title.

== Seeds ==
1. (Czech Republic) Lucie Hradecká / (India) Sania Mirza (first round)
2. (South Africa) Natalie Grandin / (Czech Republic) Vladimíra Uhlířová (final)
3. (Russia) Alla Kudryavtseva / (Germany) Jasmin Wöhr (first round)
4. (Uzbekistan) Akgul Amanmuradova / (Chinese Taipei) Chuang Chia-jung (champions)

== Draw ==
Key

- Q = Qualifier
- WC = Wild card
- LL = Lucky loser
- Alt = Alternate
- ITF = ITF entry
- PR = Protected ranking
- SR = Special ranking
- SE = Special exempt
- JE = Junior exempt
- JR = Junior Accelerator Programme entrant
- CO = College Accelerator Programme entrant
- NG = Next Gen Accelerator Program entrant
- w/o = Walkover
- r = Retired
- d = Defaulted

=== Draw ===
First round
1	(Czech Republic) L Hradecká (India) S Mirza	7	2	[10]
(Germany) A Kerber (Poland) K Piter	5	6	[12]
(France) K Mladenovic (France) P Parmentier	6	6
(United States) G Brodsky (China) W Liu	4	2
4	(Uzbekistan) A Amanmuradova (Chinese Taipei) C-j Chuang	6	7
WC	(Bulgaria) D Evtimova (France) V Muntean	0	5
(China) S-N Sun (China) Y-F Xu	0	4
(France) A Cornet (Germany) A-L Grönefeld	6	6
(France) S Foretz Gacon (France) A Védy	1	4
(United States) M Oudin (China) S Zhang	6	6
(Germany) K Barrois (Sweden) J Larsson	6	6
3	(Russia) A Kudryavtseva (Germany) J Wöhr	4	4
(Croatia) M Lučić (United States) M Washington	6	5	[7]
(Australia) D Dominikovic (Australia) J Moore	2	7	[10]
(Czech Republic) H Birnerová (United States) A Rolle	1	5
2	(South Africa) N Grandin (Czech Republic) V Uhlířová	6	7

Quarterfinals
(Germany) A Kerber (Poland) K Piter	5	4
(France) K Mladenovic (France) P Parmentier	7	6
4	(Uzbekistan) A Amanmuradova (Chinese Taipei) C-j Chuang	6	7
(France) A Cornet (Germany) A-L Grönefeld	3	6^{4}
(United States) M Oudin (China) S Zhang	6	2	[10]
(Germany) K Barrois (Sweden) J Larsson	4	6	[6]
(Australia) D Dominikovic (Australia) J Moore	3	2
2	(South Africa) N Grandin (Czech Republic) V Uhlířová	6	6

Semifinals
(France) K Mladenovic (France) P Parmentier	3	4
4	(Uzbekistan) A Amanmuradova (Chinese Taipei) C-j Chuang	6	6
(United States) M Oudin (China) S Zhang	1	1
2	(South Africa) N Grandin (Czech Republic) V Uhlířová	6	6

Finals
4	(Uzbekistan) A Amanmuradova (Chinese Taipei) C-j Chuang	6	5	[10]
2	(South Africa) N Grandin (Czech Republic) V Uhlířová	4	7	[2]
