= 2011 Bank of the West Classic – Singles =

Singles
- 2011 Bank of the West Classic

Final
- Champion: (United States) Serena Williams
- Runner-up: (France) Marion Bartoli
- Score: 7–5, 6–1

Details
- Draw: 28
- Seeds: 8

Events
Singles	Doubles
- Bank of the West Classic

Victoria Azarenka was the defending champion, but lost to qualifier Marina Erakovic in the second round.

Serena Williams, ranked world no. 169 at the time, won the title by defeating Marion Bartoli 7–5, 6–1 in the final. This win was Williams' first WTA title since her win in Wimbledon on July 3, 2010, it was on her third tournament of the year following injuries and health problems sustained with the 2010 season.

== Seeds ==
The top four seeds received a bye into the second round.

1. (Belarus) Victoria Azarenka (second round)
2. (Russia) Maria Sharapova (quarterfinals)
3. (France) Marion Bartoli (final)
4. (Australia) Samantha Stosur (second round)
5. (Poland) Agnieszka Radwańska (quarterfinals)
6. (Germany) Julia Görges (first round)
7. (Serbia) Ana Ivanovic (first round)
8. (Slovakia) Dominika Cibulková (semifinals, withdrew due to an abdominal injury)

== Draw ==
Key

- Q = Qualifier
- WC = Wild card
- LL = Lucky loser
- Alt = Alternate
- ITF = ITF entry
- PR = Protected ranking
- SR = Special ranking
- SE = Special exempt
- JE = Junior exempt
- JR = Junior Accelerator Programme entrant
- CO = College Accelerator Programme entrant
- NG = Next Gen Accelerator Program entrant
- w/o = Walkover
- r = Retired
- d = Defaulted

=== Finals ===
Semifinals
8/WC	(Slovakia) Dominika Cibulková
3	(France) Marion Bartoli	w/o
(Germany) Sabine Lisicki	1	2
(United States) Serena Williams	6	6

Final
3	(France) Marion Bartoli	5	1
(United States) Serena Williams	7	6

=== Top half ===
First round
(Sweden) S Arvidsson	2	1
Q	(New Zealand) M Erakovic	6	6
(Croatia) M Lučić	1	0
(United States) C McHale	6	6
(Japan) K Date-Krumm	2	6^{7}
8/WC	(Slovakia) D Cibulková	6	7^{9}
(Canada) R Marino	6	6
(United States) C Vandeweghe	4	4
Q	(Ukraine) O Savchuk	4	2
Q	(Poland) U Radwańska	6	6
(Japan) A Morita	6	7
7	(Serbia) A Ivanovic	3	5

Second round
1	(Belarus) V Azarenka	6	5	2
Q	(New Zealand) M Erakovic	4	7	6
(United States) C McHale	4	6	3
8/WC	(Slovakia) D Cibulková	6	2	6
3	(France) M Bartoli	6	6
(Canada) R Marino	4	3
Q	(Poland) U Radwańska	6	5	1
(Japan) A Morita	4	7	6

Quarterfinals
Q	(New Zealand) M Erakovic	1	1
8/WC	(Slovakia) D Cibulková	6	6
3	(France) M Bartoli	6
(Japan) A Morita	1	r

Semifinals
8/WC	(Slovakia) D Cibulková
3	(France) M Bartoli	w/o

=== Bottom half ===
First round
5	(Poland) A Radwańska	6	6
(Czech Republic) B Záhlavová-Strýcová	1	2
WC	(United States) H Barte	5	4
(Chinese Taipei) K-c Chang	7	6
(Romania) S Halep	1	2
(Germany) S Lisicki	6	6
6	(Germany) J Görges	2	3
(Russia) M Kirilenko	6	6
(United States) S Williams	6	6
(Australia) A Rodionova	0	0
Q	(Japan) R Fujiwara	0	2
(Slovakia) D Hantuchová	6	6

Second round
5	(Poland) A Radwańska	6	3	6
(Chinese Taipei) K-c Chang	4	6	0
(Germany) S Lisicki	6	7
4	(Australia) S Stosur	3	5
(Russia) M Kirilenko	2	6	2
(United States) S Williams	6	3	6
(Slovakia) D Hantuchová	2	6	4
2	(Russia) M Sharapova	6	2	6

Quarterfinals
5	(Poland) A Radwańska	6^{4}	6	2
(Germany) S Lisicki	7^{7}	2	6
(United States) S Williams	6	6
2	(Russia) M Sharapova	1	3

Semifinals
(Germany) S Lisicki	1	2
(United States) S Williams	6	6
