= 2011 Qatar Ladies Open – Doubles =

Doubles
- 2011 Qatar Ladies Open

Final
- Champions: (Czech Republic) Květa Peschke (Slovenia) Katarina Srebotnik
- Runners-up: (United States) Liezel Huber (Russia) Nadia Petrova
- Score: 7–5, 6–7(2), [10–8]

Events
Singles	Doubles
← 2010 ·	Qatar Ladies Open	· 2012 →

Květa Peschke and Rennae Stubbs were the reigning champions when the event was last played in 2008. Stubbs retired from the sport two weeks before this event.
As a result, Peschke plays with Katarina Srebotnik. They successfully defended their title by beating Liezel Huber and Nadia Petrova 7–5, 6–7(2), [10–8] in the final.

== Seeds ==
1. (Czech Republic) Květa Peschke / (Slovenia) Katarina Srebotnik (champions)
2. (United States) Liezel Huber / (Russia) Nadia Petrova (final)
3. (Chinese Taipei) Chan Yung-jan / (China) Zheng Jie (semifinals)
4. (Spain) Nuria Llagostera Vives / (Australia) Anastasia Rodionova (semifinals)

== Draw ==
=== Key ===
- Q = Qualifier
- WC = Wild card
- LL = Lucky loser
- Alt = Alternate
- SE = Special exempt
- PR = Protected ranking
- ITF = ITF entry
- JE = Junior exempt
- w/o = Walkover
- r = Retired
- d = Defaulted
- SR = Special ranking

=== Draw ===
First round
1	(Czech Republic) K Peschke (Slovenia) K Srebotnik	6	6
(Russia) V Dushevina (Russia) E Makarova	0	1
(South Africa) N Grandin (Czech Republic) V Uhlířová	3	6^{9}
(Russia) A Kleybanova (China) Z Yan	6	7
4	(Spain) N Llagostera Vives (Australia) A Rodionova	6	6
(Slovakia) D Hantuchová (Poland) A Radwańska	2	4
(Belarus) T Poutchek (United States) A Spears	6	6
(Poland) K Jans (Poland) A Rosolska	4	2
(India) S Mirza (Russia) E Vesnina	6	6
(Spain) MJ Martínez Sánchez (Romania) M Niculescu	1	3
WC	(Romania) A Dulgheru (Tunisia) S Sfar	4	1
3	(Chinese Taipei) Y-j Chan (China) J Zheng	6	6
(Ukraine) K Bondarenko (Kazakhstan) Y Shvedova	6^{5}	6^{3}
(Italy) A Brianti (Italy) R Vinci	7	7
(Israel) S Pe'er (China) S Peng	2	6	[2]
2	(United States) L Huber (Russia) N Petrova	6	3	[10]

Quarterfinals
1	(Czech Republic) K Peschke (Slovenia) K Srebotnik	6	4	[10]
(Russia) A Kleybanova (China) Z Yan	4	6	[7]
4	(Spain) N Llagostera Vives (Australia) A Rodionova	4	6	[10]
(Belarus) T Poutchek (United States) A Spears	6	1	[5]
(India) S Mirza (Russia) E Vesnina	2	0
3	(Chinese Taipei) Y-j Chan (China) J Zheng	6	6
(Italy) A Brianti (Italy) R Vinci	5	3
2	(United States) L Huber (Russia) N Petrova	7	6

Semifinals
1	(Czech Republic) K Peschke (Slovenia) K Srebotnik	6	3	[11]
4	(Spain) N Llagostera Vives (Australia) A Rodionova	1	6	[9]
3	(Chinese Taipei) Y-j Chan (China) J Zheng	6	2	[6]
2	(United States) L Huber (Russia) N Petrova	4	6	[10]

Finals
1	(Czech Republic) K Peschke (Slovenia) K Srebotnik	7	6^{2}	[10]
2	(United States) L Huber (Russia) N Petrova	5	7	[8]
