= 2011 Mercury Insurance Open – Singles =

Singles
- 2011 Mercury Insurance Open

Final
- Champion: (Poland) Agnieszka Radwańska
- Runner-up: (Russia) Vera Zvonareva
- Score: 6–3, 6–4

Details
- Draw: 56
- Seeds: 16

Events
Singles	Doubles
- San Diego Open

Svetlana Kuznetsova was the defending champion, but withdrew due to a groin strain.
Agnieszka Radwańska won the title, defeating Vera Zvonareva 6–3, 6–4 in the final.

== Seeds ==
The top eight seeds received a bye into the second round.

1. (Russia) Vera Zvonareva (final)
2. (Germany) Andrea Petkovic (semifinals)
3. (Poland) Agnieszka Radwańska (champion)
4. (China) Peng Shuai (quarterfinals)
5. (Serbia) Ana Ivanovic (semifinals)
6. (Slovakia) Dominika Cibulková (withdrew due to a left abdominal muscle strain)
7. (Germany) Julia Görges (second round)
8. (Slovakia) Daniela Hantuchová (quarterfinals)
9. (Italy) Roberta Vinci (second round)
10. (Italy) Flavia Pennetta (first round)
11. (Russia) Maria Kirilenko (second round, withdrew due to a left hip injury)
12. (Germany) Sabine Lisicki (quarterfinals)
13. (Australia) Jarmila Gajdošová (first round)
14. (Russia) Elena Vesnina (first round)
15. (Italy) Sara Errani (third round)
16. (Slovenia) Polona Hercog (second round)

== Draw ==
Key

- Q = Qualifier
- WC = Wild card
- LL = Lucky loser
- Alt = Alternate
- ITF = ITF entry
- PR = Protected ranking
- SR = Special ranking
- SE = Special exempt
- JE = Junior exempt
- JR = Junior Accelerator Programme entrant
- CO = College Accelerator Programme entrant
- NG = Next Gen Accelerator Program entrant
- w/o = Walkover
- r = Retired
- d = Defaulted

=== Finals ===
Quarterfinals
1	(Russia) Vera Zvonareva	6	3	6
12	(Germany) Sabine Lisicki	3	6	4
4	(China) Peng Shuai	4	2
5	(Serbia) Ana Ivanovic	6	6
8	(Slovakia) Daniela Hantuchová	6	4	4
3	(Poland) Agnieszka Radwańska	0	6	6
WC	(United States) Sloane Stephens	2	1
2	(Germany) Andrea Petkovic	6	6

Semifinals
1	(Russia) Vera Zvonareva	5	6	6
5	(Serbia) Ana Ivanovic	7	4	4
3	(Poland) Agnieszka Radwańska	4	6	6
2	(Germany) Andrea Petkovic	6	0	4

Final
1	(Russia) Vera Zvonareva	3	4
3	(Poland) Agnieszka Radwańska	6	6

=== Top half ===
==== Section 1 ====
First round
Q	(United States) J Craybas	6	6
Q	(Canada) M-È Pelletier	1	1
(Russia) V Dushevina	4	6	6
WC	(France) A Rezaï	6	3	4
Q	(South Africa) N Grandin	6^{1}	6	4
16	(Slovenia) P Hercog	7^{7}	2	6
12	(Germany) S Lisicki	6	6
Q	(Hungary) G Arn	0	2
(Japan) K Date-Krumm	7	6
WC	(Argentina) G Dulko	5	0
(Romania) S Cîrstea	5	7^{7}	3
(United States) C Vandeweghe	7	6^{3}	6

Second round
1	(Russia) V Zvonareva	6	7
Q	(United States) J Craybas	4	5
(Russia) V Dushevina	4	6	6
16	(Slovenia) P Hercog	6	1	4
12	(Germany) S Lisicki	6	6
(Japan) K Date-Krumm	1	2
(United States) C Vandeweghe	6^{7}	6	6
LL	(Ukraine) O Savchuk	7^{9}	4	3

Third round
1	(Russia) V Zvonareva	6	6
(Russia) V Dushevina	3	0
12	(Germany) S Lisicki	6	6
(United States) C Vandeweghe	4	3

Quarterfinals
1	(Russia) V Zvonareva	6	3	6
12	(Germany) S Lisicki	3	6	4

==== Section 2 ====
First round
(Belarus) O Govortsova	6^{4}	6	3
(Australia) A Rodionova	7^{7}	2	6
(United States) V King	6	4	7
Q	(Japan) R Fujiwara	1	6	5
(India) S Mirza	2	3
15	(Italy) S Errani	6	6
10	(Italy) F Pennetta	6	2	2
(Italy) A Brianti	1	6	6
(Sweden) S Arvidsson	6	6
Q	(United States) A Weinhold	3	1
(Japan) A Morita	6	4	7
(Australia) J Dokić	1	6	5

Second round
4	(China) S Peng	6	6
(Australia) A Rodionova	1	3
(United States) V King	3	2
15	(Italy) S Errani	6	6
(Italy) A Brianti	0	7^{7}	7^{9}
(Sweden) S Arvidsson	6	6^{5}	6^{7}
(Japan) A Morita	1	6^{5}
5	(Serbia) A Ivanovic	6	7^{7}

Third round
4	(China) S Peng	4	6	7^{9}
15	(Italy) S Errani	6	2	6^{7}
(Italy) A Brianti	1	2
5	(Serbia) A Ivanovic	6	6

Quarterfinals
4	(China) S Peng	4	2
5	(Serbia) A Ivanovic	6	6

=== Bottom half ===
==== Section 3 ====
First round
(South Africa) C Scheepers	4	6	5
(Czech Republic) B Záhlavová-Strýcová	6	1	7
(Croatia) M Lučić	7	2	6^{3}
(China) J Zheng	5	6	7^{7}
(Serbia) B Jovanovski	6	4	1
9	(Italy) R Vinci	3	6	6
13	(Australia) J Gajdošová	3	2
(Russia) A Kudryavtseva	6	6
Q	(United States) ZG Scandalis	0	0
(United States) C McHale	6	6
(United States) M Oudin	0	1
(United Kingdom) E Baltacha	6	6

Second round
8	(Slovakia) D Hantuchová	6	6
(Czech Republic) B Záhlavová-Strýcová	1	3
(China) J Zheng	6	6
9	(Italy) R Vinci	4	2
(Russia) A Kudryavtseva	2	1	r
(United States) C McHale	6	3
(United Kingdom) E Baltacha	0	6^{4}
3	(Poland) A Radwańska	6	7^{7}

Third round
8	(Slovakia) D Hantuchová	6	4	6
(China) J Zheng	2	6	4
(United States) C McHale	1	0
3	(Poland) A Radwańska	6	6

Quarterfinals
8	(Slovakia) D Hantuchová	6	4	4
3	(Poland) A Radwańska	0	6	6

==== Section 4 ====
First round
(China) S Zhang	4	2
WC	(United States) S Stephens	6	6
(Austria) T Paszek	0	6	7
(Romania) S Halep	6	4	5
(Canada) R Marino	3	2
11	(Russia) M Kirilenko	6	6
14	(Russia) E Vesnina	1	2
Q	(New Zealand) M Erakovic	6	6
(Czech Republic) L Hradecká	7^{9}	6^{5}	1
(France) V Razzano	6^{7}	7^{7}	6
(Russia) E Makarova	1	2
WC	(United States) A Glatch	6	6

Second round
7	(Germany) J Görges	3	5
WC	(United States) S Stephens	6	7
(Austria) T Paszek	w/o
11	(Russia) M Kirilenko
Q	(New Zealand) M Erakovic	1	3
(France) V Razzano	6	6
WC	(United States) A Glatch	3	4
2	(Germany) A Petkovic	6	6

Third round
WC	(United States) S Stephens	5
(Austria) T Paszek	3	r
(France) V Razzano	2	0	r
2	(Germany) A Petkovic	6	3

Quarterfinals
WC	(United States) S Stephens	2	1
2	(Germany) A Petkovic	6	6
