= 2011 Porsche Tennis Grand Prix – Doubles =

Doubles
- 2011 Porsche Tennis Grand Prix

Final
- Champions: (Germany) Sabine Lisicki (Australia) Samantha Stosur
- Runners-up: (Germany) Kristina Barrois (Germany) Jasmin Wöhr
- Score: 6–1, 7–6^{(7–5)}

Details
- Draw: 16
- Seeds: 4

Events
| Singles | Doubles |
- Porsche Tennis Grand Prix

Gisela Dulko and Flavia Pennetta were the defending champions, but chose not to compete.
Sabine Lisicki and Samantha Stosur were the champions, defeating Kristina Barrois and Jasmin Wöhr in the final.

== Seeds ==
1. (United States) Liezel Huber / (Spain) María José Martínez Sánchez (quarterfinals)
2. (Poland) Agnieszka Radwańska / (Slovakia) Daniela Hantuchová (first round, withdrew due to Hantuchová left thigh strain injury)
3. (South Africa) Natalie Grandin / (Czech Republic) Vladimíra Uhlířová (first round)
4. (Poland) Klaudia Jans / (Poland) Alicja Rosolska (quarterfinals)

== Draw ==
Key

- Q = Qualifier
- WC = Wild card
- LL = Lucky loser
- Alt = Alternate
- ITF = ITF entry
- PR = Protected ranking
- SR = Special ranking
- SE = Special exempt
- JE = Junior exempt
- JR = Junior Accelerator Programme entrant
- CO = College Accelerator Programme entrant
- NG = Next Gen Accelerator Program entrant
- w/o = Walkover
- r = Retired
- d = Defaulted

=== Draw ===
First round
1 | (United States) L Huber (Spain) MJ Martínez Sánchez | 6 | 6
(Russia) M Kondratieva (France) S Lefèvre | 0 | 3
(Germany) K Barrois (Germany) J Wöhr | w/o
(Russia) A Chakvetadze (Romania) A Dulgheru
4 | (Poland) K Jans (Poland) A Rosolska | 6 | 7
(Chinese Taipei) K-c Chang (Netherlands) M Krajicek | 4 | 6^{2}
(Hungary) K Marosi (Germany) K Wörle | 6 | 6
(Czech Republic) H Birnerová (Croatia) T Mirčić | 3 | 4
(Finland) E Laine (Germany) L Siegemund | 3 | 7 | [10]
(Turkey) İ Şenoğlu (Tunisia) S Sfar | 6 | 6^{2} | [7]
(Russia) V Diatchenko (Ukraine) M Koryttseva | 6 | 4 | [10]
3 | (South Africa) N Grandin (Czech Republic) V Uhlířová | 1 | 6 | [4]
WC | (Germany) J Schruff (Germany) S Werner | 1 | 4
WC | (Germany) S Lisicki (Australia) S Stosur | 6 | 6
(Germany) J Görges (Germany) A Petkovic | w/o
2 | (Poland) A Radwańska (Slovakia) D Hantuchová

Quarterfinals
1 | (United States) L Huber (Spain) MJ Martínez Sánchez | 4 | 4
(Germany) K Barrois (Germany) J Wöhr | 6 | 6
4 | (Poland) K Jans (Poland) A Rosolska | 6 | 2 | [8]
(Hungary) K Marosi (Germany) K Wörle | 1 | 6 | [10]
(Finland) E Laine (Germany) L Siegemund | 0 | 2
(Russia) V Diatchenko (Ukraine) M Koryttseva | 6 | 6
WC | (Germany) S Lisicki (Australia) S Stosur | 6 | 6
(Germany) J Görges (Germany) A Petkovic | 3 | 4

Semifinals
(Germany) K Barrois (Germany) J Wöhr | 6 | 5 | [10]
(Hungary) K Marosi (Germany) K Wörle | 2 | 7 | [7]
(Russia) V Diatchenko (Ukraine) M Koryttseva | 2 | 4
WC | (Germany) S Lisicki (Australia) S Stosur | 6 | 6

Finals
(Germany) K Barrois (Germany) J Wöhr | 1 | 6^{5}
WC | (Germany) S Lisicki (Australia) S Stosur | 6 | 7
