= 2011 Porsche Tennis Grand Prix – Singles =

Singles
- 2011 Porsche Tennis Grand Prix

Final
- Champion: (Germany) Julia Görges
- Runner-up: (Denmark) Caroline Wozniacki
- Score: 7–6^{(7–3)}, 6–3

Events
Singles	Doubles
- Porsche Tennis Grand Prix

Justine Henin was the defending champion, but she didn't defend her title due to her retirement after the Australian Open.

Julia Görges won the title, defeating World No. 1 Caroline Wozniacki in the final, 7–6^{(7–3)}, 6–3.

== Seeds ==
The top four seeds received a bye into the second round.

1. (Denmark) Caroline Wozniacki (final)
2. (Russia) Vera Zvonareva (quarterfinals)
3. (Italy) Francesca Schiavone (second round)
4. (Belarus) Victoria Azarenka (second round, retired due to shoulder injury)
5. (Australia) Samantha Stosur (semifinals)
6. (China) Li Na (second round)
7. (Serbia) Jelena Janković (second round)
8. (France) Marion Bartoli (second round)

== Draw ==
Key

- Q = Qualifier
- WC = Wild card
- LL = Lucky loser
- Alt = Alternate
- ITF = ITF entry
- PR = Protected ranking
- SR = Special ranking
- SE = Special exempt
- JE = Junior exempt
- JR = Junior Accelerator Programme entrant
- CO = College Accelerator Programme entrant
- NG = Next Gen Accelerator Program entrant
- w/o = Walkover
- r = Retired
- d = Defaulted

=== Finals ===
Semifinals
1	(Denmark) Caroline Wozniacki	7	6
(Poland) Agnieszka Radwańska	5	3
(Germany) Julia Görges	6	3	7
5	(Australia) Samantha Stosur	4	6	5

Final
1	(Denmark) Caroline Wozniacki	6^{3}	3
(Germany) Julia Görges	7	6

=== Top half ===
First round
LL	(Slovakia) Z Kučová	1	7	4
Q	(Russia) A Chakvetadze	6	5	4^{r}
(Germany) A Petkovic	3	6	6
Q	(Austria) T Paszek	6	2	2
LL	(Spain) B García Vidagany	1	2
7	(Serbia) J Janković	6	6
Q	(United States) J Hampton	0	1
(Poland) A Radwańska	6	6
WC	(Germany) K Barrois	6	6
(Czech Republic) L Šafářová	1	4
(Bulgaria) T Pironkova	4	1
8	(France) M Bartoli	6	6

Second round
1	(Denmark) C Wozniacki	6	6
LL	(Slovakia) Z Kučová	1	2
(Germany) A Petkovic	3	6	6
7	(Serbia) J Janković	6	1	3
3	(Italy) F Schiavone	1	3
(Poland) A Radwańska	6	6
WC	(Germany) K Barrois	6	6
8	(France) M Bartoli	4	2

Quarterfinals
1	(Denmark) C Wozniacki	6	6
(Germany) A Petkovic	4	1
(Poland) A Radwańska	7	6
WC	(Germany) K Barrois	5	3

Semifinals
1	(Denmark) C Wozniacki	7	6
(Poland) A Radwańska	5	3

=== Bottom half ===
First round
6	(China) N Li	6	6
(Latvia) A Sevastova	2	3
WC	(Germany) S Lisicki	7	7
(Slovakia) D Cibulková	5	6^{2}
(Germany) J Görges	6	6
Q	(Netherlands) M Krajicek	3	1
5	(Australia) S Stosur	7	6
(Spain) MJ Martínez Sánchez	5	1
(Romania) A Dulgheru	5	3
(Slovakia) D Hantuchová	7	6
(Russia) A Pavlyuchenkova	6	6
(Italy) R Vinci	3	4

Second round
6	(China) N Li	4	5
WC	(Germany) S Lisicki	6	7
(Germany) J Görges	4
4	(Belarus) V Azarenka	6	r
5	(Australia) S Stosur	6	2	6
(Slovakia) D Hantuchová	4	6	4
(Russia) A Pavlyuchenkova	6	4	2
2	(Russia) V Zvonareva	3	6	6

Quarterfinals
WC	(Germany) S Lisicki	4	4
(Germany) J Görges	6	6
5	(Australia) S Stosur	2	6	7
2	(Russia) V Zvonareva	6	3	6^{3}

Semifinals
(Germany) J Görges	6	3	7
5	(Australia) S Stosur	4	6	5
