= 2011 Qatar Ladies Open – Singles =

Singles
- 2011 Qatar Ladies Open

Final
- Champion: (Russia) Vera Zvonareva
- Runner-up: (Denmark) Caroline Wozniacki
- Score: 6–4, 6–4

Details
- Draw: 28
- Seeds: 8

Events
| Singles | Doubles |
| ← 2008 · | Qatar Ladies Open | · 2012 → |

Vera Zvonareva defeated Caroline Wozniacki in the final, 6–4, 6–4 to win the singles tennis title at the 2011 WTA Qatar Open.

Maria Sharapova was the reigning champion from when the event was last held in 2008, but chose not to compete.

== Seeds ==
The top four seeds received a bye into the second round.

1. (Denmark) Caroline Wozniacki (final)
2. (Russia) Vera Zvonareva (champion)
3. (Italy) Francesca Schiavone (second round)
4. (China) Li Na (second round)
5. (Serbia) Jelena Janković (semifinals)
6. (Belarus) Victoria Azarenka (first round)
7. (Poland) Agnieszka Radwańska (first round)
8. (Israel) Shahar Pe'er (second round)

== Draw ==
=== Key ===
- Q = Qualifier
- WC = Wild card
- LL = Lucky loser
- Alt = Alternate
- SE = Special exempt
- PR = Protected ranking
- ITF = ITF entry
- JE = Junior exempt
- w/o = Walkover
- r = Retired
- d = Defaulted
- SR = Special ranking

=== Finals ===
Semifinals
1 | (Denmark) Caroline Wozniacki | 6 | 6
(France) Marion Bartoli | 1 | 1
5 | (Serbia) Jelena Janković | 1 | 6 | 4
2 | (Russia) Vera Zvonareva | 6 | 2 | 6

Final
1 | (Denmark) Caroline Wozniacki | 4 | 4
2 | (Russia) Vera Zvonareva | 6 | 6

=== Top half ===
First round
(Russia) N Petrova | 6 | 6
(Italy) R Vinci | 4 | 2
(Italy) F Pennetta | 6 | 6
(China) J Zheng | 2 | 2
(Czech Republic) L Šafářová | 7 | 6
7 | (Poland) A Radwańska | 6^{3} | 3
LL | (Switzerland) T Bacsinszky | 3 | 2
Q | (China) S Peng | 6 | 6
(Russia) A Kleybanova | 5 | 2
(France) M Bartoli | 7 | 6
(Russia) S Kuznetsova | 2 | 4
8 | (Israel) S Pe'er | 6 | 6

Second round
1 | (Denmark) C Wozniacki | 6 | 6
(Russia) N Petrova | 3 | 2
(Italy) F Pennetta | 4 | 6 | 6
(Czech Republic) L Šafářová | 6 | 3 | 4
3 | (Italy) F Schiavone | 5 | 3
Q | (China) S Peng | 7 | 6
(France) M Bartoli | 6 | 6
8 | (Israel) S Pe'er | 1 | 0

Quarterfinals
1 | (Denmark) C Wozniacki | 6 | 6
(Italy) F Pennetta | 2 | 0
Q | (China) S Peng | 2 | 2
(France) M Bartoli | 6 | 6

Semifinals
1 | (Denmark) C Wozniacki | 6 | 6
(France) M Bartoli | 1 | 1

=== Bottom half ===
First round
5 | (Serbia) J Janković | 6 | 6
WC | (Oman) F Al Nabhani | 1 | 3
WC | (India) S Mirza | 6 | 7
Q | (Serbia) B Jovanovski | 2 | 5
(Romania) A Dulgheru | 6^{4} | 2
LL | (Czech Republic) K Zakopalová | 7 | 6
6 | (Belarus) V Azarenka | 6 | 1 | 2
(Slovakia) D Hantuchová | 4 | 6 | 6
Q | (Russia) V Dushevina | 4 | 6 | 7
(Spain) MJ Martínez Sánchez | 6 | 1 | 6^{1}
(Slovakia) D Cibulková | 6 | 4 | 7
Q | (Australia) J Groth | 4 | 6 | 6^{8}

Second round
5 | (Serbia) J Janković | 6 | 6
WC | (India) S Mirza | 0 | 1
LL | (Czech Republic) K Zakopalová | 6 | 6
4 | (China) N Li | 2 | 1
(Slovakia) D Hantuchová | 4 | 6 | 6
Q | (Russia) V Dushevina | 6 | 2 | 4
(Slovakia) D Cibulková | 1 | 2
2 | (Russia) V Zvonareva | 6 | 6

Quarterfinals
5 | (Serbia) J Janković | 6 | 6
LL | (Czech Republic) K Zakopalová | 2 | 4
(Slovakia) D Hantuchová | 5 | 7 | 5
2 | (Russia) V Zvonareva | 7 | 6^{5} | 7

Semifinals
5 | (Serbia) J Janković | 1 | 6 | 4
2 | (Russia) V Zvonareva | 6 | 2 | 6

== Qualifying draw ==
=== Players ===
==== Seeds ====
1. (Australia) Jarmila Groth (qualified)
2. (Czech Republic) Klára Zakopalová (qualifying competition, lucky loser)
3. (China) Peng Shuai (qualified)
4. (Russia) Ekaterina Makarova (second round)
5. (Kazakhstan) Yaroslava Shvedova (first round)
6. (Switzerland) Timea Bacsinszky (qualifying competition, lucky loser)
7. (Serbia) Bojana Jovanovski (qualified)
8. (Russia) Vera Dushevina (qualified)

==== Qualifiers ====
1. (Australia) Jarmila Groth
2. (Russia) Vera Dushevina
3. (China) Peng Shuai
4. (Serbia) Bojana Jovanovski

==== Lucky losers ====
1. (Czech Republic) Klára Zakopalová
2. (Switzerland) Timea Bacsinszky

=== Results ===
==== First qualifier ====
First round
1 | (Australia) Jarmila Groth | 7 | 6
WC | (Tunisia) Selima Sfar | 6^{5} | 1
(Luxembourg) Anne Kremer | 2 | 4
(Australia) Jelena Dokić | 6 | 6
WC | (Germany) Vanessa Henke | 1 | 1
PR | (Ukraine) Viktoriya Kutuzova | 6 | 6
(Japan) Ayumi Morita | 3 | 6 | 5
6 | (Switzerland) Timea Bacsinszky | 6 | 4 | 7

Second round
1 | (Australia) Jarmila Groth | 6 | 6
(Australia) Jelena Dokić | 2 | 1
PR | (Ukraine) Viktoriya Kutuzova | 3 | 6 | 0
6 | (Switzerland) Timea Bacsinszky | 6 | 2 | 6

Qualifying competition
1 | (Australia) Jarmila Groth | 7 | 6
6 | (Switzerland) Timea Bacsinszky | 6^{2} | 4

==== Second qualifier ====
First round
2 | (Czech Republic) Klára Zakopalová | 6 | 6
(Germany) Tatjana Malek | 0 | 4
(Italy) Alberta Brianti | 4 | 6 | 3
(United Kingdom) Elena Baltacha | 6 | 2 | 6
(Romania) Monica Niculescu | 1 | 4
(Germany) Kristina Barrois | 6 | 6
WC | (France) Alizé Lim | 5 | 2
8 | (Russia) Vera Dushevina | 7 | 6

Second round
2 | (Czech Republic) Klára Zakopalová | 6 | 6
(United Kingdom) Elena Baltacha | 1 | 2
(Germany) Kristina Barrois | 5 | 3
8 | (Russia) Vera Dushevina | 7 | 6

Qualifying competition
2 | (Czech Republic) Klára Zakopalová | 6 | 6^{3} | 1
8 | (Russia) Vera Dushevina | 2 | 7 | 6

==== Third qualifier ====
First round
3 | (China) Peng Shuai | 6 | 2 | 6
(Spain) Nuria Llagostera Vives | 1 | 6 | 1
(Chinese Taipei) Chan Yung-jan | 4 | 5
(Australia) Anastasia Rodionova | 6 | 7
(Belgium) Kirsten Flipkens | 7 | 7
(South Africa) Chanelle Scheepers | 5 | 6^{4}
WC | (Russia) Elena Vesnina | 7 | 7
5 | (Kazakhstan) Yaroslava Shvedova | 5 | 5

Second round
3 | (China) Peng Shuai | 6 | 6
(Australia) Anastasia Rodionova | 3 | 2
(Belgium) Kirsten Flipkens | 4 | 6^{4}
WC | (Russia) Elena Vesnina | 6 | 7

Qualifying competition
3 | (China) Peng Shuai | 6 | 6
WC | (Russia) Elena Vesnina | 3 | 3

==== Fourth qualifier ====
First round
4 | (Russia) Ekaterina Makarova | 6 | 4 | 6
(Japan) Kurumi Nara | 2 | 6 | 4
(Ukraine) Kateryna Bondarenko | 6 | 6
(China) Zhang Shuai | 4 | 4
(Italy) Maria Elena Camerin | 6 | 3 | 4
(Poland) Urszula Radwańska | 4 | 6 | 6
(Chinese Taipei) Chang Kai-chen | 7 | 0 | 3
7 | (Serbia) Bojana Jovanovski | 5 | 6 | 6

Second round
4 | (Russia) Ekaterina Makarova | 1 | 1
(Ukraine) Kateryna Bondarenko | 6 | 6
(Poland) Urszula Radwańska | 6 | 1 | 6^{11}
7 | (Serbia) Bojana Jovanovski | 4 | 6 | 7

Qualifying competition
(Ukraine) Kateryna Bondarenko | 0 | 7 | 4
7 | (Serbia) Bojana Jovanovski | 6 | 5 | 6
