= 2011 Bank of the West Classic – Doubles =

Doubles
- 2011 Bank of the West Classic

Final
- Champions: (Belarus) Victoria Azarenka (Russia) Maria Kirilenko
- Runners-up: (United States) Liezel Huber (United States) Lisa Raymond
- Score: 6–1, 6–3

Details
- Draw: 16
- Seeds: 4

Events
Singles	Doubles
← 2010 ·	Bank of the West Classic	· 2012 →

Lindsay Davenport and Liezel Huber were the defending champions, but only Huber chose to participate.
She played alongside Lisa Raymond and they reached the final.

There Victoria Azarenka and Maria Kirilenko won the title, defeating the American pair 6–1, 6–3.

== Seeds ==
1. (United States) Liezel Huber / (United States) Lisa Raymond (final)
2. (Belarus) Victoria Azarenka / (Russia) Maria Kirilenko (champions)
3. (Germany) Julia Görges / (Czech Republic) Barbora Záhlavová-Strýcová (semifinals)
4. (South Africa) Natalie Grandin / (Czech Republic) Vladimíra Uhlířová (first round)

== Draw ==
=== Key ===
- Q = Qualifier
- WC = Wild card
- LL = Lucky loser
- Alt = Alternate
- SE = Special exempt
- PR = Protected ranking
- ITF = ITF entry
- JE = Junior exempt
- w/o = Walkover
- r = Retired
- d = Defaulted
- SR = Special ranking

=== Draw ===
First round
1	(United States) L Huber (United States) L Raymond	2	7	[10]
(Poland) K Jans-Ignacik (Poland) A Rosolska	6	5	[8]
(Canada) S Fichman (Canada) M-È Pelletier	7^{7}	6
(Russia) M Kondratieva (France) S Lefèvre	6^{2}	1
4	(South Africa) N Grandin (Czech Republic) V Uhlířová	5	4
(Japan) S Aoyama (Japan) R Fujiwara	7	6
(Slovakia) D Cibulková (Japan) K Date-Krumm	4	7	[10]
(Chinese Taipei) K-c Chang (China) S Sun	6	5	[5]
(Sweden) S Arvidsson (New Zealand) M Erakovic
(Germany) S Lisicki (Australia) S Stosur	w/o
(Poland) U Radwańska (Ukraine) O Savchuk	0	2
3	(Germany) J Görges (Czech Republic) B Záhlavová-Strýcová	6	6
(Australia) An Rodionova (Russia) Ar Rodionova	6	2	[10]
WC	(Canada) R Marino (United States) C McHale	0	6	[6]
(United States) R Kops-Jones (United States) A Spears	2	1
2	(Belarus) V Azarenka (Russia) M Kirilenko	6	6

Quarterfinals
1	(United States) L Huber (United States) L Raymond	6	6
(Canada) S Fichman (Canada) M-È Pelletier	2	4
(Japan) S Aoyama (Japan) R Fujiwara	3	6	[10]
(Slovakia) D Cibulková (Japan) K Date-Krumm	6	4	[6]
(Germany) S Lisicki (Australia) S Stosur	6	4	[5]
3	(Germany) J Görges (Czech Republic) B Záhlavová-Strýcová	2	6	[10]
(Australia) An Rodionova (Russia) Ar Rodionova	3	1
2	(Belarus) V Azarenka (Russia) M Kirilenko	6	6

Semifinals
1	(United States) L Huber (United States) L Raymond	6	6
(Japan) S Aoyama (Japan) R Fujiwara	1	2
3	(Germany) J Görges (Czech Republic) B Záhlavová-Strýcová	6	3	[5]
2	(Belarus) V Azarenka (Russia) M Kirilenko	4	6	[10]

Final
1	(United States) L Huber (United States) L Raymond	1	3
2	(Belarus) V Azarenka (Russia) M Kirilenko	6	6
