= 2011 New Haven Open at Yale – Doubles =

Doubles
- 2011 New Haven Open at Yale

Final
- Champions: (Chinese Taipei) Chuang Chia-jung (Belarus) Olga Govortsova
- Runners-up: (Italy) Sara Errani (Italy) Roberta Vinci
- Score: 7–5, 6–2

Events
Singles	men	women
Doubles	men	women
← 2010 ·	New Haven Open at Yale	· 2012 →

Květa Peschke and Katarina Srebotnik were the defending champion, but they withdrew in the quarterfinals before their match against Natalie Grandin and Vladimíra Uhlířová.

Chuang Chia-jung and Olga Govortsova won the tournament. They defeated Italian pair Sara Errani and Roberta Vinci in the final, 7–5, 6–2.

== Seeds ==
1. (Czech Republic) Květa Peschke / (Slovenia) Katarina Srebotnik (quarterfinals, withdrew)
2. (Russia) Elena Vesnina / (Australia) Anastasia Rodionova (first round)
3. (Chinese Taipei) Chuang Chia-jung / (Belarus) Olga Govortsova (champions)
4. (Spain) Nuria Llagostera Vives / (Spain) Anabel Medina Garrigues (semifinals, withdrew)

== Draw ==
=== Key ===
- Q = Qualifier
- WC = Wild card
- LL = Lucky loser
- Alt = Alternate
- SE = Special exempt
- PR = Protected ranking
- ITF = ITF entry
- JE = Junior exempt
- w/o = Walkover
- r = Retired
- d = Defaulted
- SR = Special ranking

=== Draw ===
First round
1	(Czech Republic) K Peschke (Slovenia) K Srebotnik	6	6
(Russia) M Kondratieva (France) S Lefevre	3	1
(South Africa) N Grandin (Czech Republic) V Uhlířová	6^{2}	6	[12]
(Germany) K Barrois (Czech Republic) K Zakopalová	7^{7}	2	[10]
3	(Chinese Taipei) C-j Chuang (Belarus) O Govortsova	6	6
(Greece) E Daniilidou (Slovenia) P Hercog	4	2
(Czech Republic) I Benešová (Romania) A Dulgheru	6	6
(United States) A Muhammed (United States) A Riske	3	3
(Chinese Taipei) S-w Hsieh (Romania) M Niculescu	6	7^{7}
WC	(United States) B Augustine (United States) W Jones	2	6^{3}
(Poland) K Jans-Ignacik (Poland) A Rosolska	3	4
4	(Spain) N Llagostera Vives (Spain) A Medina Garrigues	6	6
(Italy) S Errani (Italy) R Vinci	6	6
(United States) R Kops-Jones (United States) A Spears	4	2
(Russia) V Dushevina (United States) S Stephens	6	3	[10]
2	(Russia) E Vesnina (Australia) A Rodionova	4	6	[6]

Quarterfinals
1	(Czech Republic) K Peschke (Slovenia) K Srebotnik
(South Africa) N Grandin (Czech Republic) V Uhlířová	w/o
3	(Chinese Taipei) C-j Chuang (Belarus) O Govortsova	4	6	[10]
(Czech Republic) I Benešová (Romania) A Dulgheru	6	0	[7]
(Chinese Taipei) S-w Hsieh (Romania) M Niculescu	6	1	[8]
4	(Spain) N Llagostera Vives (Spain) A Medina Garrigues	1	6	[10]
(Italy) S Errani (Italy) R Vinci	6	7
(Russia) V Dushevina (United States) S Stephens	0	5

Semifinals
(South Africa) N Grandin (Czech Republic) V Uhlířová	4	5
3	(Chinese Taipei) C-j Chuang (Belarus) O Govortsova	6	7
4	(Spain) N Llagostera Vives (Spain) A Medina Garrigues
(Italy) S Errani (Italy) R Vinci	w/o

Final
3	(Chinese Taipei) C-j Chuang (Belarus) O Govortsova	7	6
(Italy) S Errani (Italy) R Vinci	5	2
