= 2017 Winston-Salem Open =

- Date: August 20–26
- Edition: 49th
- Category: ATP World Tour 250 Series
- Draw: 48S / 16D
- Surface: Hard / outdoor
- Location: Winston-Salem, North Carolina, U.S.
- Venue: Wake Forest University

Champions

Singles
- (Spain) Roberto Bautista Agut

Doubles
- (Netherlands) Jean-Julien Rojer / (Romania) Horia Tecău
← 2016 ·	Winston-Salem Open	· 2018 →

The 2017 Winston–Salem Open was a men's tennis tournament played on outdoor hard courts. It was the 49th edition of the Winston-Salem Open (as successor to previous tournaments in New Haven and Long Island), and part of the ATP World Tour 250 Series of the 2017 ATP World Tour. It took place at Wake Forest University in Winston-Salem, North Carolina, United States, from August 20 through August 26, 2017. It was the last event on the 2017 US Open Series before the 2017 US Open.

== Singles main-draw entrants ==
=== Seeds ===
Country	Player	Rank*	Seed
ESP	Roberto Bautista Agut	14	1
ESP	Pablo Carreño Busta	17	2
USA	John Isner	19	3
~~RSA~~	~~Kevin Anderson~~	~~27~~	~~4~~
URU	Pablo Cuevas	28	5
USA	Steve Johnson	36	6
ITA	Paolo Lorenzi	37	7
ESP	Fernando Verdasco	40	8
FRA	Gilles Simon	42	9
JPN	Yūichi Sugita	46	10
SRB	Viktor Troicki	47	11
GBR	Aljaž Bedene	48	12
KOR	Chung Hyeon	49	13
CRO	Borna Ćorić	50	14
RUS	Daniil Medvedev	51	15
CZE	Jiří Veselý	52	16
POR	João Sousa	54	17

* Rankings are as of August 14, 2017

=== Other entrants ===
The following players received wildcards into the singles main draw:

- (Cyprus) Petros Chrysochos
- (Croatia) Borna Ćorić
- (United States) Taylor Fritz
- (Latvia) Ernests Gulbis

The following players received entry using a protected ranking:

- (Lithuania) Ričardas Berankis
- (Russia) ~~Dmitry Tursunov~~

The following players received entry from the qualifying draw:

- (Australia) Alex Bolt
- (Brazil) Rogério Dutra Silva
- (United Kingdom) Kyle Edmund
- (Hungary) Márton Fucsovics

The following players received entry as lucky losers:

- (France) Jonathan Eysseric
- (Germany) Dominik Köpfer

=== Withdrawals ===
Before the tournament

- (South Africa) Kevin Anderson →replaced by (Germany) Dominik Köpfer
- (Georgia (country)) Nikoloz Basilashvili →replaced by (Brazil) Thiago Monteiro
- (Brazil) Thomaz Bellucci →replaced by (France) Jonathan Eysseric
- (United States) Ryan Harrison →replaced by (Italy) Thomas Fabbiano
- (France) Nicolas Mahut →replaced by (Italy) Andreas Seppi
- (United States) Sam Querrey →replaced by (Russia) Andrey Rublev
- (Argentina) Diego Schwartzman →replaced by (Slovakia) Norbert Gombos

=== Retirements ===
- (France) Julien Benneteau

== Doubles main-draw entrants ==
=== Seeds ===
Country	Player	Country	Player	Rank^{1}	Seed
~~COL~~	~~Juan Sebastián Cabal~~	~~COL~~	~~Robert Farah~~	~~49~~	~~1~~
NED	Jean-Julien Rojer	ROU	Horia Tecău	49	2
CRO	Mate Pavić	SRB	Nenad Zimonjić	57	3
USA	Brian Baker	CRO	Nikola Mektić	66	4

- Rankings are as of August 14, 2017

=== Other entrants ===
The following pairs received wildcards into the doubles main draw:

- (Tunisia) Skander Mansouri / (Germany) Christian Seraphim
- (India) Leander Paes / (India) Purav Raja

The following pair received entry as alternates:

- (Argentina) Andrés Molteni / (Canada) Adil Shamasdin

=== Withdrawals ===
Before the tournament

- (Colombia) Juan Sebastián Cabal

== Champions ==
=== Singles ===
- (Spain) Roberto Bautista Agut def. (Bosnia and Herzegovina) Damir Džumhur, 6–4, 6–4

=== Doubles ===
- (Netherlands) Jean-Julien Rojer / (Romania) Horia Tecău def. (Chile) Julio Peralta / (Argentina) Horacio Zeballos, 6–3, 6–4
