= 2015 Winston-Salem Open – Doubles =

Doubles
- 2015 Winston-Salem Open

Final
- Champions: (United Kingdom) Dominic Inglot (Sweden) Robert Lindstedt
- Runners-up: (United States) Eric Butorac (United States) Scott Lipsky
- Score: 6–2, 6–4

Events
Singles	Doubles
← 2014 ·	Winston-Salem Open	· 2016 →

Juan Sebastián Cabal and Robert Farah were the defending champions but chose not to participate this year.
Dominic Inglot and Robert Lindstedt won the title, defeating Eric Butorac and Scott Lipsky in the final, 6–2, 6–4.

== Seeds ==
1. (Poland) Łukasz Kubot / (Canada) Daniel Nestor (semifinals)
2. (Philippines) Treat Huey / (Spain) David Marrero (first round)
3. (United States) Eric Butorac / (United States) Scott Lipsky (final)
4. (United Kingdom) Dominic Inglot / (Sweden) Robert Lindstedt (champions)

== Draw ==
=== Key ===
- Q = Qualifier
- WC = Wild card
- LL = Lucky loser
- Alt = Alternate
- SE = Special exempt
- PR = Protected ranking
- ITF = ITF entry
- JE = Junior exempt
- w/o = Walkover
- r = Retired
- d = Defaulted
- SR = Special ranking

=== Draw ===
First round
1	(Poland) Ł Kubot (Canada) D Nestor	6	7^{7}
(Austria) O Marach (Czech Republic) J Veselý	3	6^{4}
(United States) N Monroe (France) B Paire	6	6^{2}	[7]
(Spain) P Carreño Busta (Spain) G García-López	1	7^{7}	[10]
3	(United States) E Butorac (United States) S Lipsky	6	6
Alt	(Spain) P Andújar (Brazil) M Demoliner	3	3
(Poland) M Fyrstenberg (Pakistan) A-u-H Qureshi	3	6	[10]
(United Kingdom) J Marray (New Zealand) M Venus	6	3	[6]
WC	(Tunisia) S Mansouri (Germany) C Seraphim	2	4
WC	(United States) C Harrison (United States) R Harrison	6	6
(Russia) T Gabashvili (Portugal) J Sousa	3	2
4	(United Kingdom) D Inglot (Sweden) R Lindstedt	6	6
(Germany) A Begemann (Finland) H Kontinen	6	1	[8]
(Australia) S Groth (Australia) C Guccione	3	6	[10]
(Brazil) A Sá (New Zealand) A Sitak	7^{7}	6^{8}	[10]
2	(Philippines) T Huey (Spain) D Marrero	6^{3}	7^{10}	[6]

Quarterfinals
1	(Poland) Ł Kubot (Canada) D Nestor	6	6
(Spain) P Carreño Busta (Spain) G García-López	2	3
3	(United States) E Butorac (United States) S Lipsky	6	5	[10]
(Poland) M Fyrstenberg (Pakistan) A-u-H Qureshi	3	7	[4]
WC	(United States) C Harrison (United States) R Harrison	4	4
4	(United Kingdom) D Inglot (Sweden) R Lindstedt	6	6
(Australia) S Groth (Australia) C Guccione	4	7^{7}	[10]
(Brazil) A Sá (New Zealand) A Sitak	6	6^{3}	[2]

Semifinals
1	(Poland) Ł Kubot (Canada) D Nestor	4	6	[7]
3	(United States) E Butorac (United States) S Lipsky	6	4	[10]
4	(United Kingdom) D Inglot (Sweden) R Lindstedt	6	4	[11]
(Australia) S Groth (Australia) C Guccione	4	6	[9]

Final
3	(United States) E Butorac (United States) S Lipsky	2	4
4	(United Kingdom) D Inglot (Sweden) R Lindstedt	6	6
