= 2016 Winston-Salem Open – Doubles =

Doubles
- 2016 Winston-Salem Open

Final
- Champions: (Spain) Guillermo García-López (Finland) Henri Kontinen
- Runners-up: (Germany) Andre Begemann (India) Leander Paes
- Score: 4–6, 7–6^{(8–6)}, [10–8]

Events
Singles	Doubles
← 2015 ·	Winston-Salem Open	· 2017 →

Dominic Inglot and Robert Lindstedt were the defending champions, but chose not to participate together. Inglot played alongside Marin Draganja, but lost in the quarterfinals to Lindstedt and Aisam-ul-Haq Qureshi. Lindstedt and Qureshi then lost in the semifinals to Andre Begemann and Leander Paes.

Guillermo García-López and Henri Kontinen won the title, defeating Begemann and Paes in the final, 4–6, 7–6^{(8–6)}, [10–8].

== Seeds ==
1. (Poland) Łukasz Kubot / (Serbia) Nenad Zimonjić (quarterfinals)
2. (Croatia) Mate Pavić / (New Zealand) Michael Venus (semifinals)
3. (Sweden) Robert Lindstedt / (Pakistan) Aisam-ul-Haq Qureshi (semifinals)
4. (United States) Eric Butorac / (United States) Scott Lipsky (first round)

== Draw ==
=== Key ===
- Q = Qualifier
- WC = Wild card
- LL = Lucky loser
- Alt = Alternate
- ITF = ITF entry
- PR = Protected ranking
- SR = Special ranking
- SE = Special exempt
- JE = Junior exempt
- JR = Junior Accelerator Programme entrant
- CO = College Accelerator Programme entrant
- NG = Next Gen Accelerator Program entrant
- w/o = Walkover
- r = Retired
- d = Defaulted

=== Draw ===
First round
1	(Poland) Ł Kubot (Serbia) N Zimonjić	2	7^{7}	[10]
(United States) N Monroe (United States) D Young	6	6^{5}	[7]
(Australia) C Guccione (Brazil) A Sá	4	4
WC	(Germany) A Begemann (India) L Paes	6	6
3	(Sweden) R Lindstedt (Pakistan) A-u-H Qureshi	3	7^{7}	[10]
WC	(Tunisia) S Mansouri (Germany) C Seraphim	6	6^{4}	[6]
(Netherlands) W Koolhof (Netherlands) M Middelkoop	6	3	[4]
PR	(Croatia) M Draganja (United Kingdom) D Inglot	4	6	[10]
(United States) T Fritz (Spain) A Ramos-Viñolas	6^{7}	5
(Spain) G García-López (Finland) H Kontinen	7^{9}	7
(Israel) J Erlich (Mexico) S González	6^{5}	6	[10]
4	(United States) E Butorac (United States) S Lipsky	7^{7}	4	[3]
(Italy) P Lorenzi (Chile) J Peralta	6	2	[7]
(Russia) A Kuznetsov (France) S Robert	2	6	[10]
(Argentina) G Durán (Spain) D Marrero	0	5
2	(Croatia) M Pavić (New Zealand) M Venus	6	7

Quarterfinals
1	(Poland) Ł Kubot (Serbia) N Zimonjić	4	4
WC	(Germany) A Begemann (India) L Paes	6	6
3	(Sweden) R Lindstedt (Pakistan) A-u-H Qureshi	7^{14}	6^{4}	[10]
PR	(Croatia) M Draganja (United Kingdom) D Inglot	6^{12}	7^{7}	[8]
(Spain) G García-López (Finland) H Kontinen	7^{7}	4	[10]
(Israel) J Erlich (Mexico) S González	6^{1}	6	[8]
(Russia) A Kuznetsov (France) S Robert	7^{7}	1	[7]
2	(Croatia) M Pavić (New Zealand) M Venus	6^{1}	6	[10]

Semifinals
WC	(Germany) A Begemann (India) L Paes	1	7^{7}	[10]
3	(Sweden) R Lindstedt (Pakistan) A-u-H Qureshi	6	6^{5}	[4]
(Spain) G García-López (Finland) H Kontinen	7^{7}	6
2	(Croatia) M Pavić (New Zealand) M Venus	6^{5}	3

Final
WC	(Germany) A Begemann (India) L Paes	6	6^{6}	[8]
(Spain) G García-López (Finland) H Kontinen	4	7^{8}	[10]
