= 2015 Winston-Salem Open =

- Date: August 23–29
- Edition: 47th
- Category: ATP World Tour 250 Series
- Draw: 32S/16D
- Surface: Hard / outdoor
- Location: Winston-Salem, North Carolina, USA
- Venue: Wake Forest University

Champions

Singles
- (South Africa) Kevin Anderson

Doubles
- (United Kingdom) Dominic Inglot / (Sweden) Robert Lindstedt
← 2014 ·	Winston-Salem Open	· 2016 →

The 2015 Winston-Salem Open was a men's tennis tournament played on outdoor hard courts. It was the 47th edition of the Winston-Salem Open (as successor to previous tournaments in New Haven and Long Island), and part of the ATP World Tour 250 Series of the 2015 ATP World Tour. It took place at Wake Forest University in Winston-Salem, North Carolina, United States, from August 23 through August 29, 2015. It was the last event on the 2015 US Open Series before the 2015 US Open.

== Singles main-draw entrants ==
=== Seeds ===
Country	Player	Rank*	Seed
FRA	Gilles Simon	11	1
RSA	Kevin Anderson	15	2
FRA	Jo-Wilfried Tsonga	19	3
SRB	Viktor Troicki	20	4
ESP	Guillermo García López	29	5
BRA	Thomaz Bellucci	33	6
USA	Sam Querrey	34	7
CRO	Borna Ćorić	38	8
FRA	Benoît Paire	42	9
POR	João Sousa	44	10
CZE	Jiří Veselý	45	11
ESP	Pablo Andújar	46	12
USA	Steve Johnson	48	13
CYP	Marcos Baghdatis	50	14
RUS	Teymuraz Gabashvili	51	15
POL	Jerzy Janowicz	52	16

- Rankings are as of August 17, 2015

=== Other entrants ===
The following players received wildcards into the singles main draw:

- (South Africa) Kevin Anderson
- (United States) Jared Donaldson
- (Germany) Tommy Haas
- (France) Gilles Simon

The following players received entry from the qualifying draw:

- (Italy) Marco Cecchinato
- (France) Pierre-Hugues Herbert
- (Slovakia) Martin Kližan
- (United States) Frances Tiafoe

=== Withdrawals ===
Before the tournament

- (Spain) Roberto Bautista Agut →replaced by Federico Delbonis
- (Dominican Republic) Víctor Estrella Burgos →replaced by James Duckworth
- (Belgium) David Goffin →replaced by Malek Jaziri
- (Spain) Marcel Granollers →replaced by James Ward
- (Argentina) Juan Mónaco →replaced by Steve Darcis
- (Luxembourg) Gilles Müller →replaced by Marsel İlhan
- (Spain) Albert Ramos Viñolas →replaced by Chung Hyeon

During the tournament

- (Chinese Taipei) Lu Yen-hsun

=== Retirements ===
- (Belgium) Steve Darcis

== Doubles main-draw entrants ==
=== Seeds ===
Country	Player	Country	Player	Rank^{1}	Seed
POL	Łukasz Kubot	CAN	Daniel Nestor	62	1
PHI	Treat Huey	ESP	David Marrero	73	2
USA	Eric Butorac	USA	Scott Lipsky	73	3
GBR	Dominic Inglot	SWE	Robert Lindstedt	78	4

- Rankings are as of August 17, 2015

=== Other entrants ===
The following pairs received wildcards into the doubles main draw:

- (United States) Christian Harrison / (United States) Ryan Harrison
- (Tunisia) Skander Mansouri / (Germany) Christian Seraphim

The following pair received entry as alternates:

- (Spain) Pablo Andújar / (Brazil) Marcelo Demoliner

=== Withdrawals ===
Before the tournament

- (Slovakia) Martin Kližan

== Champions ==
=== Singles ===
- (South Africa) Kevin Anderson def. (France) Pierre-Hugues Herbert, 6–4, 7–5

=== Doubles ===
- (United Kingdom) Dominic Inglot / (Sweden) Robert Lindstedt def. (United States) Eric Butorac / (United States) Scott Lipsky, 6–2, 6–4
