= 2018 Winston-Salem Open – Singles =

Singles
- 2018 Winston-Salem Open

Final
- Champion: (Russia) Daniil Medvedev
- Runner-up: (United States) Steve Johnson
- Score: 6–4, 6–4

Details
- Draw: 48 (4 Q / 3 WC )
- Seeds: 16

Events
Singles	Doubles
← 2017 ·	Winston-Salem Open	· 2019 →

Roberto Bautista Agut was the defending champion, but chose not to participate this year.

Daniil Medvedev won the title, defeating Steve Johnson in the final, 6–4, 6–4.

== Seeds ==
All seeds receive a bye into the second round.

1. (Belgium) David Goffin (withdrew)
2. (Spain) Pablo Carreño Busta (semifinals)
3. (United Kingdom) Kyle Edmund (quarterfinals)
4. (Italy) Marco Cecchinato (second round)
5. (Bosnia and Herzegovina) Damir Džumhur (withdrew)
6. (South Korea) Hyeon Chung (quarterfinals)
7. (Serbia) Filip Krajinović (third round)
8. (United States) Steve Johnson (final)

9. (United States) Sam Querrey (second round)
10. (Georgia (country)) Nikoloz Basilashvili (second round)
11. (Russia) Andrey Rublev (second round)
12. (France) Gilles Simon (withdrew)
13. (Spain) Albert Ramos Viñolas (second round)
14. (Chile) Nicolás Jarry (quarterfinals)
15. (Australia) Alex de Minaur (second round)
16. (Germany) Peter Gojowczyk (third round)

Click on the seed number of a player to go to their draw section.

== Draw ==
=== Key ===
- Q = Qualifier
- WC = Wild card
- LL = Lucky loser
- Alt = Alternate
- ITF = ITF entry
- PR = Protected ranking
- SR = Special ranking
- SE = Special exempt
- JE = Junior exempt
- JR = Junior Accelerator Programme entrant
- CO = College Accelerator Programme entrant
- NG = Next Gen Accelerator Program entrant
- w/o = Walkover
- r = Retired
- d = Defaulted

=== Finals ===
Quarterfinals
(Russia) Daniil Medvedev	7^{7}	6
(United States) Ryan Harrison	6^{4}	4
14	(Chile) Nicolás Jarry	6	2	1
(Japan) Taro Daniel	4	6	6
8	(United States) Steve Johnson	6	6
3/WC	(United Kingdom) Kyle Edmund	1	2
6	(South Korea) Chung Hyeon	3	4
2	(Spain) Pablo Carreño Busta	6	6

Semifinals
(Russia) Daniil Medvedev	6	6
(Japan) Taro Daniel	1	1
8	(United States) Steve Johnson	6	6
2	(Spain) Pablo Carreño Busta	3	4

Final
(Russia) Daniil Medvedev	6	6
8	(United States) Steve Johnson	4	4

=== Top half ===
==== Section 1 ====
First round
LL	(Argentina) G Andreozzi	6	4	6
(Hungary) M Fucsovics	3	6	0
(Bosnia and Herzegovina) M Bašić	4	4
(Russia) D Medvedev	6	6
(United States) R Harrison	6	6
WC	(Croatia) B Gojo	2	4
(Tunisia) M Jaziri	1	4
WC	(United States) T Fritz	6	6

Second round
Q	(Moldova) R Albot	4	3
LL	(Argentina) G Andreozzi	6	6
(Russia) D Medvedev	6	6
15	(Australia) A de Minaur	3	3
12	(France) G Simon
(United States) R Harrison	w/o
WC	(United States) T Fritz	4	1
7	(Serbia) F Krajinović	6	6

Third round
LL	(Argentina) G Andreozzi	5	1
(Russia) D Medvedev	7	6
(United States) R Harrison	6	7^{7}
7	(Serbia) F Krajinović	3	6^{4}

Quarterfinals
(Russia) D Medvedev	7^{7}	6
(United States) R Harrison	6^{4}	4

==== Section 2 ====
First round
(Germany) J-L Struff	7^{7}	6
(France) B Paire	6^{5}	3
(Portugal) J Sousa	5	4
(Italy) A Seppi	7	6
(Australia) J Millman	4	6^{7}
(Japan) T Daniel	6	7^{9}
(Lithuania) R Berankis	4	3
(United States) T Sandgren	6	6

Second round
4	(Italy) M Cecchinato	3	4
(Germany) J-L Struff	6	6
(Italy) A Seppi	4	3
14	(Chile) N Jarry	6	6
9	(United States) S Querrey	6	5	6^{3}
(Japan) T Daniel	3	7	7^{7}
(United States) T Sandgren	2	6^{5}
LL	(Germany) D Köpfer	6	7^{7}

Third round
(Germany) J-L Struff	2	2
14	(Chile) N Jarry	6	6
(Japan) T Daniel	7^{7}	7^{7}
LL	(Germany) D Köpfer	6^{4}	6^{3}

Quarterfinals
14	(Chile) N Jarry	6	2	1
(Japan) T Daniel	4	6	6

=== Bottom half ===
==== Section 3 ====
First round
(Serbia) L Đere	3	6^{4}
Q	(United States) T Paul	6	7^{7}
Q	(Canada) B Schnur	6^{5}	6^{1}
(Spain) J Munar	7^{7}	7^{7}
(Argentina) G Pella	4	2
(Spain) R Carballés Baena	6	6
(Argentina) L Mayer	6	7^{7}
(Japan) Y Sugita	3	6^{4}

Second round
8	(United States) S Johnson	7^{9}	6
Q	(United States) T Paul	6^{7}	2
(Spain) J Munar	6	6
11/WC	(Russia) A Rublev	3	2
13	(Spain) A Ramos Viñolas	1	3
(Spain) R Carballés Baena	6	6
(Argentina) L Mayer	3	3
3/WC	(United Kingdom) K Edmund	6	6

Third round
8	(United States) S Johnson	6	6
(Spain) J Munar	4	4
(Spain) R Carballés Baena	5	5
3/WC	(United Kingdom) K Edmund	7	7

Quarterfinals
8	(United States) S Johnson	6	6
3/WC	(United Kingdom) K Edmund	1	2

==== Section 4 ====
First round
(Cyprus) M Baghdatis	6^{2}	4
(Spain) G García López	7^{7}	6
(Italy) M Berrettini	6	6
(France) J Benneteau	3	3
Q	(Argentina) H Zeballos	7^{7}	7
(Slovakia) L Lacko	6^{3}	5
(France) P-H Herbert	2	3
LL	(Croatia) F Škugor	6	6

Second round
6	(South Korea) H Chung	7^{7}	6
(Spain) G García López	6^{4}	2
(Italy) M Berrettini	7	6
10	(Georgia (country)) N Basilashvili	5	3
16	(Germany) P Gojowczyk	6	6^{4}	6
Q	(Argentina) H Zeballos	4	7^{7}	1
LL	(Croatia) F Škugor	3	7^{7}	3
2	(Spain) P Carreño Busta	6	6^{3}	6

Third round
6	(South Korea) H Chung	6	3	6
(Italy) M Berrettini	3	6	3
16	(Germany) P Gojowczyk	2	6^{5}
2	(Spain) P Carreño Busta	6	7^{7}

Quarterfinals
6	(South Korea) H Chung	3	4
2	(Spain) P Carreño Busta	6	6

== Qualifying ==
=== Seeds ===
1. (Moldova) Radu Albot (qualified)
2. (Australia) Jordan Thompson (withdrew)
3. (France) Corentin Moutet (first round)
4. (Argentina) Guido Andreozzi (qualifying competition, lucky loser)
5. (Argentina) Horacio Zeballos (qualified)
6. (Germany) Dominik Köpfer (qualifying competition, lucky loser)
7. (Canada) Brayden Schnur (qualified)
8. (Austria) Maximilian Neuchrist (first round)

=== Qualifiers ===
1. (Moldova) Radu Albot
2. (Canada) Brayden Schnur
3. (Argentina) Horacio Zeballos
4. (United States) Tommy Paul

=== Lucky losers ===
1. (Argentina) Guido Andreozzi
2. (Croatia) Franko Škugor
3. (Germany) Dominik Köpfer

=== Qualifying draw ===
==== First qualifier ====
First round
1	(Moldova) Radu Albot	6	6
Alt	(Cyprus) Petros Chrysochos	3	2
(Brazil) Thomaz Bellucci	2	6	2
6	(Germany) Dominik Köpfer	6	1	6

Qualifying competition
1	(Moldova) Radu Albot	6	4	6
6	(Germany) Dominik Köpfer	4	6	3

==== Second qualifier ====
First round
Alt	(Australia) Luke Saville	6	6
WC	(United States) Julian Zlobinsky	1	3
PR	(Australia) James Duckworth	4	4
7	(Canada) Brayden Schnur	6	6

Qualifying competition
Alt	(Australia) Luke Saville	2	6	3
7	(Canada) Brayden Schnur	6	3	6

==== Third qualifier ====
First round
3	(France) Corentin Moutet	5	4
Alt	(Croatia) Franko Škugor	7	6
WC	(Tunisia) Skander Mansouri	4	6	4
5	(Argentina) Horacio Zeballos	6	2	6

Qualifying competition
Alt	(Croatia) Franko Škugor	1	4
5	(Argentina) Horacio Zeballos	6	6

==== Fourth qualifier ====
First round
4	(Argentina) Guido Andreozzi	3	6	6
(Brazil) Karue Sell	6	3	2
(United States) Tommy Paul	6	6
8	(Austria) Maximilian Neuchrist	2	4

Qualifying competition
4	(Argentina) Guido Andreozzi	1	3
(United States) Tommy Paul	6	6

== Sources ==
- Main draw
- Qualifying draw
