= 2015 Winston-Salem Open – Singles =

Singles
- 2015 Winston-Salem Open

Final
- Champion: (South Africa) Kevin Anderson
- Runner-up: (France) Pierre-Hugues Herbert
- Score: 6–4, 7–5

Events
Singles	Doubles
- Winston-Salem Open

Lukáš Rosol was the defending champion, but lost to Jerzy Janowicz in the second round. Kevin Anderson won the title defeating in the final Pierre-Hugues Herbert with the score 6–4, 7–5.

== Seeds ==
All seeds receive a bye into the second round.

1. (France) Gilles Simon (second round)
2. (South Africa) Kevin Anderson (champion)
3. (France) Jo-Wilfried Tsonga (third round)
4. (Serbia) Viktor Troicki (second round)
5. (Spain) Guillermo García López (second round)
6. (Brazil) Thomaz Bellucci (quarterfinals)
7. (United States) Sam Querrey (second round)
8. (Croatia) Borna Ćorić (quarterfinals)

9. (France) Benoît Paire (second round)
10. (Portugal) João Sousa (second round)
11. (Czech Republic) Jiří Veselý (third round)
12. (Spain) Pablo Andújar (second round)
13. (United States) Steve Johnson (semifinals)
14. (Cyprus) Marcos Baghdatis (second round)
15. (Russia) Teymuraz Gabashvili (third round)
16. (Poland) Jerzy Janowicz (third round)

Click on the seed number of a player to go to their draw section.

== Draw ==
Key

- Q = Qualifier
- WC = Wild card
- LL = Lucky loser
- Alt = Alternate
- ITF = ITF entry
- PR = Protected ranking
- SR = Special ranking
- SE = Special exempt
- JE = Junior exempt
- JR = Junior Accelerator Programme entrant
- CO = College Accelerator Programme entrant
- NG = Next Gen Accelerator Program entrant
- w/o = Walkover
- r = Retired
- d = Defaulted

=== Finals ===
Quarterfinals
Q	(France) Pierre-Hugues Herbert	4	7^{7}	6
(Spain) Pablo Carreño Busta	6	6^{5}	2
13	(United States) Steve Johnson	w/o
(Chinese Taipei) Lu Yen-hsun
6	(Brazil) Thomaz Bellucci	3	2
(Tunisia) Malek Jaziri	6	6
8	(Croatia) Borna Ćorić	2	6^{1}
2/WC	(South Africa) Kevin Anderson	6	7^{7}

Semifinals
Q	(France) Pierre-Hugues Herbert	3	7^{7}	6
13	(United States) Steve Johnson	6	6^{5}	2
(Tunisia) Malek Jaziri	4	3
2/WC	(South Africa) Kevin Anderson	6	6

Final
Q	(France) Pierre-Hugues Herbert	4	5
2/WC	(South Africa) Kevin Anderson	6	7

=== Top half ===
==== Section 1 ====
First round
Q	(Italy) M Cecchinato	2	2
(United Kingdom) A Bedene	6	6
Q	(France) P-H Herbert	6	6
(Ukraine) S Stakhovsky	3	2
(Spain) P Carreño Busta	6	6
WC	(Germany) T Haas	3	4
(Argentina) F Delbonis	4	3
(Italy) S Bolelli	6	6

Second round
1/WC	(France) G Simon	7^{7}	6^{5}	6^{6}
(United Kingdom) A Bedene	6^{5}	7^{7}	7^{8}
Q	(France) P-H Herbert	6	2	7
14	(Cyprus) M Baghdatis	3	6	5
10	(Portugal) J Sousa	4	4
(Spain) P Carreño Busta	6	6
(Italy) S Bolelli	7^{9}	6^{4}	7^{11}
7	(United States) S Querrey	6^{7}	7^{7}	6^{9}

Third round
(United Kingdom) A Bedene	3	0
Q	(France) P-H Herbert	6	6
(Spain) P Carreño Busta	6	4	6
(Italy) S Bolelli	4	6	1

Quarterfinals
Q	(France) P-H Herbert	4	7^{7}	6
(Spain) P Carreño Busta	6	6^{5}	2

==== Section 2 ====
First round
(United States) D Young	3	3
(Uzbekistan) D Istomin	6	6
(Australia) S Groth	6^{4}	7^{10}	7^{7}
WC	(United States) J Donaldson	7^{7}	6^{8}	6^{5}
(United Kingdom) J Ward	7^{9}	4	3
(South Korea) H Chung	6^{7}	6	6
(Chinese Taipei) Y-h Lu	7^{7}	6
(Netherlands) R Haase	6^{4}	2

Second round
3	(France) J-W Tsonga	5	6	6
(Uzbekistan) D Istomin	7	4	1
(Australia) S Groth	4	7^{7}	1
13	(United States) S Johnson	6	6^{4}	6
9	(France) B Paire	1	4
(South Korea) H Chung	6	6
(Chinese Taipei) Y-h Lu	6	6
5	(Spain) G García López	3	3

Third round
3	(France) J-W Tsonga	3	6	6^{4}
13	(United States) S Johnson	6	4	7^{7}
(South Korea) H Chung	6^{1}	6	5
(Chinese Taipei) Y-h Lu	7^{7}	1	7

Quarterfinals
13	(United States) S Johnson	w/o
(Chinese Taipei) Y-h Lu

=== Bottom half ===
==== Section 3 ====
First round
Q	(United States) F Tiafoe	3	7^{7}	7^{7}
(Australia) J Duckworth	6	6^{4}	6^{3}
Q	(Slovakia) M Kližan	7^{7}	6
(Turkey) M İlhan	6^{1}	2
(Ukraine) A Dolgopolov	6^{1}	6^{5}
(Australia) T Kokkinakis	7^{7}	7^{7}
(Brazil) J Souza	3	4
(Tunisia) M Jaziri	6	6

Second round
6	(Brazil) T Bellucci	6	2	7^{7}
Q	(United States) F Tiafoe	3	6	6^{2}
Q	(Slovakia) M Kližan	3	4
11	(Czech Republic) J Veselý	6	6
15	(Russia) T Gabashvili	7^{7}	6^{5}	7^{7}
(Australia) T Kokkinakis	6^{5}	7^{7}	6^{3}
(Tunisia) M Jaziri	6	4	6
4	(Serbia) V Troicki	4	6	4

Third round
6	(Brazil) T Bellucci	6	6^{7}	6
11	(Czech Republic) J Veselý	1	7^{9}	4
15	(Russia) T Gabashvili	5	4
(Tunisia) M Jaziri	7	6

Quarterfinals
6	(Brazil) T Bellucci	3	2
(Tunisia) M Jaziri	6	6

==== Section 4 ====
First round
(Colombia) S Giraldo	2
(Belgium) S Darcis	0^{r}
(Spain) D Gimeno Traver	4	6^{8}
(Argentina) D Schwartzman	6	7^{10}
(Czech Republic) L Rosol	6	7^{7}
(Latvia) E Gulbis	4	6^{4}
(France) N Mahut	4	7^{7}	0
(Kazakhstan) M Kukushkin	6	6^{4}	6

Second round
8	(Croatia) B Ćorić	4	6	6
(Colombia) S Giraldo	6	2	2
(Argentina) D Schwartzman	4	7	7
12	(Spain) P Andújar	6	5	5
16	(Poland) J Janowicz	6	6
(Czech Republic) L Rosol	3	2
(Kazakhstan) M Kukushkin	6	2	3
2/WC	(South Africa) K Anderson	4	6	6

Third round
8	(Croatia) B Ćorić	6	6
(Argentina) D Schwartzman	2	1
16	(Poland) J Janowicz	6^{2}	4
2/WC	(South Africa) K Anderson	7^{7}	6

Quarterfinals
8	(Croatia) B Ćorić	2	6^{1}
2/WC	(South Africa) K Anderson	6	7^{7}

== Qualifying ==
=== Seeds ===
1. (Slovakia) Martin Kližan (qualified)
2. (France) Lucas Pouille (second round)
3. (Moldova) Radu Albot (second round)
4. (Bosnia and Herzegovina) Damir Džumhur (first round)
5. (Italy) Marco Cecchinato (qualified)
6. (Belgium) Kimmer Coppejans (first round)
7. (United States) Bjorn Fratangelo (qualifying competition)
8. (United States) Ryan Harrison (qualifying competition)

=== Qualifiers ===
1. (Slovakia) Martin Kližan
2. (France) Pierre-Hugues Herbert
3. (United States) Frances Tiafoe
4. (Italy) Marco Cecchinato

=== Draw ===
==== First qualifier ====
First round
1	(Slovakia) Martin Kližan	6	6
(United States) Eric Quigley	4	2
WC	(Germany) Christian Seraphim	3	2
(United States) Deiton Baughman	6	6
WC	(United States) Jonathan Ho	4	3
(Canada) Brayden Schnur	6	6
(United States) Ryan Shane	2	6^{4}
7	(United States) Bjorn Fratangelo	6	7^{7}

Second round
1	(Slovakia) Martin Kližan	6	3	6
(United States) Deiton Baughman	4	6	0
(Canada) Brayden Schnur	3	4
7	(United States) Bjorn Fratangelo	6	6

Qualifying competition
1	(Slovakia) Martin Kližan	7^{7}	6
7	(United States) Bjorn Fratangelo	6^{4}	3

==== Second qualifier ====
First round
2	(France) Lucas Pouille	4	7^{7}	6
(United States) Jarmere Jenkins	6	6^{0}	3
(Brazil) Marcelo Demoliner	4	2
(United States) Sekou Bangoura	6	6
WC	(United States) Sam Bloom	3	2
(United States) Kevin King	6	6
(France) Pierre-Hugues Herbert	6	6
6	(Belgium) Kimmer Coppejans	3	2

Second round
2	(France) Lucas Pouille	4	1
(United States) Sekou Bangoura	6	6
(United States) Kevin King	5	2
(France) Pierre-Hugues Herbert	7	6

Qualifying competition
(United States) Sekou Bangoura	4	3
(France) Pierre-Hugues Herbert	6	6

==== Third qualifier ====
First round
3	(Moldova) Radu Albot	6	6
(Switzerland) Keivon Tabrizi	3	3
(United States) Patrick Daciek	6^{5}	0
WC	(United States) Frances Tiafoe	7^{7}	6
(Germany) Mischa Zverev	4	1^{r}
(India) Sanam Singh	6	3
(United States) Clay Thompson	7^{7}	6^{3}	0
8	(United States) Ryan Harrison	6^{4}	7^{7}	6

Second round
3	(Moldova) Radu Albot	4	4
WC	(United States) Frances Tiafoe	6	6
(India) Sanam Singh	3	6^{2}
8	(United States) Ryan Harrison	6	7^{7}

Qualifying competition
WC	(United States) Frances Tiafoe	1	6	6
8	(United States) Ryan Harrison	6	3	3

==== Fourth qualifier ====
First round
4	(Bosnia and Herzegovina) Damir Džumhur	3	2
(United States) Ryan Haviland	6	6
(United States) Wil Spencer	6	1	7^{7}
(Canada) Frank Dancevic	2	6	6^{3}
(Tunisia) Skander Mansouri	4	7^{7}	6
(South Africa) Damon Gooch	6	6^{5}	3
(United States) Andrew Carter	5	3
5	(Italy) Marco Cecchinato	7	6

Second round
(United States) Ryan Haviland	7	4	2
(United States) Wil Spencer	5	6	6
(Tunisia) Skander Mansouri	1	4
5	(Italy) Marco Cecchinato	6	6

Qualifying competition
(United States) Wil Spencer	5	4
5	(Italy) Marco Cecchinato	7	6
