= 2017 Winston-Salem Open – Doubles =

Doubles
- 2017 Winston-Salem Open

Final
- Champions: (Netherlands) Jean-Julien Rojer (Romania) Horia Tecău
- Runners-up: (Chile) Julio Peralta (Argentina) Horacio Zeballos
- Score: 6–3, 6–4

Events
Singles	Doubles
← 2016 ·	Winston-Salem Open	· 2018 →

Guillermo García López and Henri Kontinen were the defending champions, but chose not to participate this year.

Jean-Julien Rojer and Horia Tecău won the title, defeating Julio Peralta and Horacio Zeballos in the final, 6–3, 6–4.

== Seeds ==
1. (Colombia) Juan Sebastián Cabal / (Colombia) Robert Farah (withdrew)
2. (Netherlands) Jean-Julien Rojer / (Romania) Horia Tecău (champions)
3. (Croatia) Mate Pavić / (Serbia) Nenad Zimonjić (semifinals)
4. (United States) Brian Baker / (Croatia) Nikola Mektić (semifinals)

== Draw ==
=== Key ===
- Q = Qualifier
- WC = Wild card
- LL = Lucky loser
- Alt = Alternate
- SE = Special exempt
- PR = Protected ranking
- ITF = ITF entry
- JE = Junior exempt
- w/o = Walkover
- r = Retired
- d = Defaulted
- SR = Special ranking

=== Draw ===
First round
Alt	(Argentina) A Molteni (Canada) A Shamasdin	6	6
(Poland) M Matkowski (Belarus) M Mirnyi	3	0
(Chile) J Peralta (Argentina) H Zeballos	7^{7}	6
WC	(Tunisia) S Mansouri (Germany) C Seraphim	6^{3}	3
3	(Croatia) M Pavić (Serbia) N Zimonjić	6	3	[10]
(Austria) J Knowle (France) G Simon	2	6	[6]
(Mexico) S González (France) F Martin	4	2
(Sweden) R Lindstedt (Austria) A Peya	6	6
(Italy) P Lorenzi (Croatia) F Škugor	6^{3}	6	[10]
WC	(India) L Paes (India) P Raja	7^{7}	3	[5]
(Spain) M López (Spain) D Marrero	4	4
4	(United States) B Baker (Croatia) N Mektić	6	6
(New Zealand) M Daniell (United States) N Monroe	6	6
(Brazil) A Sá (New Zealand) M Venus	3	4
(United Kingdom) D Inglot (Canada) D Nestor	3	4
2	(Netherlands) J-J Rojer (Romania) H Tecău	6	6

Quarterfinals
Alt	(Argentina) A Molteni (Canada) A Shamasdin	6^{6}	4
(Chile) J Peralta (Argentina) H Zeballos	7^{8}	6
3	(Croatia) M Pavić (Serbia) N Zimonjić	4	7^{7}	[10]
(Sweden) R Lindstedt (Austria) A Peya	6	6^{2}	[5]
(Italy) P Lorenzi (Croatia) F Škugor	3	6	[5]
4	(United States) B Baker (Croatia) N Mektić	6	4	[10]
(New Zealand) M Daniell (United States) N Monroe	1	3
2	(Netherlands) J-J Rojer (Romania) H Tecău	6	6

Semifinals
(Chile) J Peralta (Argentina) H Zeballos	7^{8}	1	[10]
3	(Croatia) M Pavić (Serbia) N Zimonjić	6^{6}	6	[8]
4	(United States) B Baker (Croatia) N Mektić	1	0
2	(Netherlands) J-J Rojer (Romania) H Tecău	6	6

Final
(Chile) J Peralta (Argentina) H Zeballos	3	4
2	(Netherlands) J-J Rojer (Romania) H Tecău	6	6
