= 2013 Winston-Salem Open – Singles =

Singles
- 2013 Winston-Salem Open

Final
- Champion: (Austria) Jürgen Melzer
- Runner-up: (France) Gaël Monfils
- Score: 6–3, 2–1, ret.

Events
Singles	Doubles
- Winston-Salem Open

John Isner was the two-time defending champion, but withdrew from the tournament because of a hip injury.
Jürgen Melzer won the title, defeating Gaël Monfils in the final, 6–3, 2–1, ret.

== Seeds ==
All seeds received a bye into the second round.

1. (Czech Republic) Tomáš Berdych (withdrew because of a right shoulder injury)
2. (Italy) Andreas Seppi (second round)
3. (United States) John Isner (withdrew because of a hip injury)
4. (Spain) Tommy Robredo (third round)
5. (France) Benoît Paire (third round)
6. (United States) Sam Querrey (semifinals)
7. (Spain) Fernando Verdasco (quarterfinals)
8. (Argentina) Juan Mónaco (third round)
9. (Austria) Jürgen Melzer (champion)
10. (Ukraine) Alexandr Dolgopolov (semifinals)
11. (Finland) Jarkko Nieminen (third round)
12. (Czech Republic) Lukáš Rosol (second round)
13. (Russia) Dmitry Tursunov (quarterfinals)
14. (Slovakia) Martin Kližan (second round)
15. (France) Gaël Monfils (final, retired because of a left hip injury)
16. (Spain) Pablo Andújar (second round)

== Draw ==
Key

- Q = Qualifier
- WC = Wild card
- LL = Lucky loser
- Alt = Alternate
- ITF = ITF entry
- PR = Protected ranking
- SR = Special ranking
- SE = Special exempt
- JE = Junior exempt
- JR = Junior Accelerator Programme entrant
- CO = College Accelerator Programme entrant
- NG = Next Gen Accelerator Program entrant
- w/o = Walkover
- r = Retired
- d = Defaulted

=== Finals ===
Quarterfinals
(Lithuania) Ričardas Berankis	3	4
6	(United States) Sam Querrey	6	6
13	(Russia) Dmitry Tursunov	4	3
9	(Austria) Jürgen Melzer	6	6
7/WC	(Spain) Fernando Verdasco	7^{10}	4	4
15	(France) Gaël Monfils	6^{8}	6	6
10	(Ukraine) Alexandr Dolgopolov	7^{7}	6
(Chinese Taipei) Lu Yen-hsun	6^{2}	3

Semifinals
6	(United States) Sam Querrey	2	6	3
9	(Austria) Jürgen Melzer	6	4	6
15	(France) Gaël Monfils	7^{11}	6
10	(Ukraine) Alexandr Dolgopolov	6^{9}	3

Final
9	(Austria) Jürgen Melzer	6	2
15	(France) Gaël Monfils	3	1^{r}

=== Top half ===
==== Section 1 ====
First round
(Lithuania) R Berankis	7^{7}	6
(France) K de Schepper	6^{3}	4
Q	(Denmark) F Nielsen	1	3
(Spain) R Bautista-Agut	6	6
WC	(United States) M Fish	6	3	6
(Russia) E Donskoy	3	6	1
(Slovenia) G Žemlja	1	6	1
(Spain) G García López	6	4	6

Second round
LL	(United States) D Kudla	4	4
(Lithuania) R Berankis	6	6
(Spain) R Bautista-Agut	6	6
14	(Slovakia) M Kližan	4	1
11	(Finland) J Nieminen	7	6^{3}	3
WC	(United States) M Fish	5	7^{7}	2^{r}
(Spain) G García López	6	3	4
6	(United States) S Querrey	4	6	6

Third round
(Lithuania) R Berankis	6	6
(Spain) R Bautista-Agut	3	3
11	(Finland) J Nieminen	6	6^{4}	6^{10}
6	(United States) S Querrey	4	7^{7}	7^{12}

Quarterfinals
(Lithuania) R Berankis	3	4
6	(United States) S Querrey	6	6

==== Section 2 ====
First round
(Russia) A Bogomolov Jr.	6	6
(Romania) V Hănescu	3	4
Q	(Belgium) D Goffin	4	6	1
(United States) J Sock	6	3	0^{r}
Q	(Netherlands) T de Bakker	3	6	6
(Netherlands) I Sijsling	6	4	4
(United States) R Williams	1	5
(United States) J Blake	6	7

Second round
LL	(Portugal) J Sousa	4	1
(Russia) A Bogomolov Jr.	6	6
Q	(Belgium) D Goffin	6	5	1
13	(Russia) D Tursunov	4	7	6
9	(Austria) J Melzer	7	6^{4}	4
Q	(Netherlands) T de Bakker	5	7^{7}	2^{r}
(United States) J Blake	6^{9}	6	3
5	(France) B Paire	7^{11}	2	6

Third round
(Russia) A Bogomolov Jr.	3	5
13	(Russia) D Tursunov	6	7
9	(Austria) J Melzer	6	6
5	(France) B Paire	4	3

Quarterfinals
13	(Russia) D Tursunov	4	3
9	(Austria) J Melzer	6	6

=== Bottom half ===
==== Section 3 ====
First round
(United States) M Russell	4	7^{8}	4
(United States) T Smyczek	6	6^{6}	6
(Netherlands) R Haase	6	6
(France) A Mannarino	3	3
(Argentina) L Mayer	6^{5}	6^{4}
(Argentina) G Pella	7^{7}	7^{7}
(France) G Rufin	6	3	6
(Uzbekistan) D Istomin	4	6	3

Second round
7/WC	(Spain) F Verdasco	3	6	6
(United States) T Smyczek	6	3	3
(Netherlands) R Haase	6	3	7
12	(Czech Republic) L Rosol	4	6	5
15	(France) G Monfils	6	6
(Argentina) G Pella	2	2
(France) G Rufin	6^{5}	6	3
4	(Spain) T Robredo	7^{7}	4	6

Third round
7/WC	(Spain) F Verdasco	6	6^{8}	6
(Netherlands) R Haase	4	7^{10}	3
15	(France) G Monfils	7^{7}	4	6
4	(Spain) T Robredo	6^{2}	6	2

Quarterfinals
7/WC	(Spain) F Verdasco	7^{10}	4	4
15	(France) G Monfils	6^{8}	6	6

==== Section 4 ====
First round
(France) N Mahut	6	6
(Poland) Ł Kubot	3	1
(Spain) D Gimeno Traver	7^{8}	7^{7}
(France) É Roger-Vasselin	6^{6}	6^{5}
WC	(Belgium) R Bogaerts	1	1
(Chinese Taipei) Y-h Lu	6	6
(United States) B Reynolds	1	2
Q	(United States) S Johnson	6	6

Second round
8	(Argentina) J Mónaco	6^{4}	6	6
(France) N Mahut	7^{7}	3	4
(Spain) D Gimeno Traver	6	1	4
10	(Ukraine) A Dolgopolov	4	6	6
16	(Spain) P Andújar	4	3
(Chinese Taipei) Y-h Lu	6	6
Q	(United States) S Johnson	6^{5}	6	7
2	(Italy) A Seppi	7^{7}	4	5

Third round
8	(Argentina) J Mónaco	6	3	3
10	(Ukraine) A Dolgopolov	4	6	6
(Chinese Taipei) Y-h Lu	6	6
Q	(United States) S Johnson	3	2

Quarterfinals
10	(Ukraine) A Dolgopolov	7^{7}	6
(Chinese Taipei) Y-h Lu	6^{2}	3

== Qualifying ==
=== Seeds ===
1. (Belgium) David Goffin (qualified)
2. (Portugal) João Sousa (qualifying competition, lucky loser)
3. (Netherlands) Thiemo de Bakker (qualified)
4. (United States) Denis Kudla (qualifying competition, lucky loser)
5. (United States) Steve Johnson (qualified)
6. (Australia) James Duckworth (second round)
7. (India) Saketh Myneni (second round)
8. (India) Sanam Singh (qualifying competition)

=== Qualifiers ===
1. (Belgium) David Goffin
2. (United States) Steve Johnson
3. (Netherlands) Thiemo de Bakker
4. (Denmark) Frederik Nielsen

=== Lucky losers ===
1. (Portugal) João Sousa
2. (United States) Denis Kudla

=== Qualifying draw ===
==== First qualifier ====
First round
1	(Belgium) David Goffin	6	6
(Slovakia) Filip Polášek	1	3
(Zimbabwe) Takanyi Garanganga	5	6	6
(United States) Greg Ouellette	7	3	2
(Germany) Andre Begemann	4	3
(Slovakia) Michal Mertiňák	6	6
WC	(New Zealand) Adam Lee	6	3	1
7	(India) Saketh Myneni	4	6	6

Second round
1	(Belgium) David Goffin	6	6
(Zimbabwe) Takanyi Garanganga	2	1
(Slovakia) Michal Mertiňák	2	6	6
7	(India) Saketh Myneni	6	3	2

Qualifying competition
1	(Belgium) David Goffin	6	6
(Slovakia) Michal Mertiňák	2	1

==== Second qualifier ====
First round
2	(Portugal) João Sousa	6	6
WC	(Brazil) Pedro Dumont	3	0
(Australia) Chris Guccione	3	4
(United States) Eric Quigley	6	6
WC	(Tunisia) Aws Laaribi	1	3
(United States) Michael Shabaz	6	6
(United States) Tyler Hochwalt	5	3
5	(United States) Steve Johnson	7	6

Second round
2	(Portugal) João Sousa	5	7^{7}	6
(United States) Eric Quigley	7	6^{3}	1
(United States) Michael Shabaz	4	1
5	(United States) Steve Johnson	6	6

Qualifying competition
2	(Portugal) João Sousa	6	1	4
5	(United States) Steve Johnson	4	6	6

==== Third qualifier ====
First round
3	(Netherlands) Thiemo de Bakker	6	6
(Australia) John Peers	3	3
(United Kingdom) Dominic Inglot	4	6	6
(Philippines) Treat Conrad Huey	6	4	3
(United States) Jesse Witten	6	6
WC	(United States) Strong Kirchheimer	4	4
(United States) Sekou Bangoura	5	2
8	(India) Sanam Singh	7	6

Second round
3	(Netherlands) Thiemo de Bakker	3	6	6
(United Kingdom) Dominic Inglot	6	3	0
(United States) Jesse Witten	2	4
8	(India) Sanam Singh	6	6

Qualifying competition
3	(Netherlands) Thiemo de Bakker	6	6
8	(India) Sanam Singh	1	4

==== Fourth qualifier ====
First round
4	(United States) Denis Kudla	6	6
(United States) Andrew Carter	1	1
(Brazil) Henrique Cunha	6	7^{7}
(Czech Republic) František Čermák	3	6^{4}
(South Africa) Keith-Patrick Crowley	3	4
(Denmark) Frederik Nielsen	6	6
(New Zealand) Michael Venus	6^{6}	7^{7}	5
6	(Australia) James Duckworth	7^{8}	6^{3}	7

Second round
4	(United States) Denis Kudla	6	6
(Brazil) Henrique Cunha	3	1
(Denmark) Frederik Nielsen	7	6
6	(Australia) James Duckworth	5	2

Qualifying competition
4	(United States) Denis Kudla	6	2	0
(Denmark) Frederik Nielsen	4	6	6
