= 2018 Winston-Salem Open =

- Date: August 19–25
- Edition: 50th
- Category: ATP World Tour 250 Series
- Draw: 48S / 16D
- Surface: Hard / outdoor
- Location: Winston-Salem, North Carolina, U.S.
- Venue: Wake Forest University

Champions

Singles
- (Russia) Daniil Medvedev

Doubles
- (Netherlands) Jean-Julien Rojer / (Romania) Horia Tecău
← 2017 ·	Winston-Salem Open	· 2019 →

The 2018 Winston-Salem Open was a men's tennis tournament played on outdoor hard courts. It was the 50th edition of the Winston-Salem Open (as successor to previous tournaments in New Haven and Long Island), and part of the ATP World Tour 250 Series of the 2018 ATP World Tour. It took place at Wake Forest University in Winston-Salem, North Carolina, United States, from August 19 through August 25, 2018. It was the last event on the 2018 US Open Series before the 2018 US Open.

== Singles main-draw entrants ==
=== Seeds ===
Country	Player	Rank*	Seed
~~BEL~~	~~David Goffin~~	~~11~~	~~1~~
ESP	Pablo Carreño Busta	13	2
GBR	Kyle Edmund	16	3
ITA	Marco Cecchinato	22	4
~~BIH~~	~~Damir Džumhur~~	~~24~~	~~5~~
KOR	Chung Hyeon	25	6
SRB	Filip Krajinović	31	7
USA	Steve Johnson	33	8
USA	Sam Querrey	34	9
GEO	Nikoloz Basilashvili	36	10
RUS	Andrey Rublev	37	11
~~FRA~~	~~Gilles Simon~~	~~40~~	~~12~~
ESP	Albert Ramos Viñolas	41	13
CHI	Nicolás Jarry	42	14
AUS	Alex de Minaur	43	15
GER	Peter Gojowczyk	47	16

* Rankings are as of August 13, 2018

=== Other entrants ===
The following players received wildcards into the singles main draw:

- (United Kingdom) Kyle Edmund
- (United States) Taylor Fritz
- (Croatia) Borna Gojo
- (Russia) Andrey Rublev

The following players received entry from the qualifying draw:

- (Moldova) Radu Albot
- (United States) Tommy Paul
- (Canada) Brayden Schnur
- (Argentina) Horacio Zeballos

The following players received entry as lucky losers:

- (Argentina) Guido Andreozzi
- (Germany) Dominik Köpfer
- (Croatia) Franko Škugor

=== Withdrawals ===
Before the tournament

- (Ukraine) Alexandr Dolgopolov → replaced by (Argentina) Guido Pella
- (United States) Jared Donaldson → replaced by (Croatia) Franko Škugor
- (Bosnia and Herzegovina) Damir Džumhur → replaced by (Germany) Dominik Köpfer
- (Belgium) David Goffin → replaced by (Argentina) Guido Andreozzi
- (Kazakhstan) Mikhail Kukushkin → replaced by (Serbia) Laslo Đere
- (Spain) Feliciano López → replaced by (Cyprus) Marcos Baghdatis
- (Spain) Fernando Verdasco → replaced by (Spain) Jaume Munar

During the tournament

- (France) Gilles Simon

== Doubles main-draw entrants ==
=== Seeds ===
Country	Player	Country	Player	Rank^{1}	Seed
POL	Łukasz Kubot	BRA	Marcelo Melo	23	1
NED	Jean-Julien Rojer	ROU	Horia Tecău	25	2
JPN	Ben McLachlan	GER	Jan-Lennard Struff	53	3
CHI	Julio Peralta	ARG	Horacio Zeballos	64	4

- Rankings are as of August 13, 2018

=== Other entrants ===
The following pairs received wildcards into the doubles main draw:

- (United States) James Cerretani / (India) Leander Paes
- ~~(Australia) Lleyton Hewitt / (Australia) John Peers~~

The following pair received entry as alternates:

- (Belarus) Max Mirnyi / (Austria) Philipp Oswald

=== Withdrawals ===
Before the tournament

- (Australia) Lleyton Hewitt

== Champions ==
=== Singles ===
- (Russia) Daniil Medvedev def. (United States) Steve Johnson, 6–4, 6–4

=== Doubles ===
- (Netherlands) Jean-Julien Rojer / (Romania) Horia Tecău def. (United States) James Cerretani / (India) Leander Paes, 6–4, 6–2
