= 2013 Winston-Salem Open =

- Date: August 18 – August 24
- Edition: 45th
- Category: ATP World Tour 250 Series
- Draw: 32S/16D
- Surface: Hard / outdoor
- Location: Winston-Salem, North Carolina, USA
- Venue: Wake Forest University

Champions

Singles
- (Austria) Jürgen Melzer

Doubles
- (Canada) Daniel Nestor / (India) Leander Paes
← 2012 ·	Winston-Salem Open	· 2014 →

The 2013 Winston-Salem Open was a men's tennis tournament played on outdoor hard courts. It was the 45th edition of the Winston-Salem Open (as successor to previous tournaments in New Haven and Long Island), and was part of the ATP World Tour 250 Series of the 2013 ATP World Tour. It took place at the Wake Forest University in Winston-Salem, North Carolina, United States, from August 18 through August 24, 2013. It was the last event on the 2013 US Open Series before the 2013 US Open.

Ninth-seeded Jürgen Melzer won the singles title.

== Singles main-draw entrants ==
=== Seeds ===
Country	Player	Ranking*	Seed
~~CZE~~	~~Tomáš Berdych~~	~~6~~	~~1~~
ITA	Andreas Seppi	21	2
~~USA~~	~~John Isner~~	~~22~~	~~3~~
ESP	Tommy Robredo	23	4
FRA	Benoît Paire	24	5
USA	Sam Querrey	28	6
ESP	Fernando Verdasco	31	7
ARG	Juan Mónaco	32	8
AUT	Jürgen Melzer	33	9
UKR	Alexandr Dolgopolov	37	10
FIN	Jarkko Nieminen	39	11
CZE	Lukáš Rosol	43	12
RUS	Dmitry Tursunov	44	13
SVK	Martin Kližan	45	14
FRA	Gaël Monfils	49	15
ESP	Pablo Andújar	51	16

- Rankings are as of August 12, 2013

=== Other entrants ===
The following players received wildcards into the singles main draw:

- (Czech Republic) Tomáš Berdych
- (Belgium) Romain Bogaerts
- (United States) Mardy Fish
- (Spain) Fernando Verdasco

The following players received entry from the qualifying draw:

- (Netherlands) Thiemo de Bakker
- (Belgium) David Goffin
- (United States) Steve Johnson
- (Denmark) Frederik Nielsen

=== Withdrawals ===
Before the tournament

- (Czech Republic) Tomáš Berdych (right shoulder injury)
- (Argentina) Carlos Berlocq
- (Russia) Nikolay Davydenko
- (Spain) Marcel Granollers
- (Germany) Tommy Haas
- (United States) John Isner (hip injury)
- (Spain) Albert Ramos
- (Serbia) Viktor Troicki (suspension)
- (Argentina) Horacio Zeballos

=== Retirements ===
- (Netherlands) Thiemo de Bakker (toe injury)
- (United States) Mardy Fish (unwell)
- (France) Gaël Monfils (left hip injury)
- (United States) Jack Sock (right leg injury)

== Doubles main-draw entrants ==
=== Seeds ===
Country	Player	Country	Player	Rank^{1}	Seed
CAN	Daniel Nestor	IND	Leander Paes	28	1
~~IND~~	~~Rohan Bopanna~~	~~FRA~~	~~Édouard Roger-Vasselin~~	~~33~~	~~2~~
ESP	David Marrero	ESP	Fernando Verdasco	40	3
GBR	Colin Fleming	GBR	Jonathan Marray	55	4

- Rankings are as of August 12, 2013

=== Other entrants ===
The following pairs received wildcards into the doubles main draw:

- (United States) Eric Butorac / (Denmark) Frederik Nielsen
- (United States) James Cerretani / (Netherlands) Robin Haase

The following pair received entry as alternates:

- (Czech Republic) Jaroslav Levinský / (Chinese Taipei) Lu Yen-hsun

=== Withdrawals ===
Before the tournament

- (France) Édouard Roger-Vasselin (ankle injury)

== Champions ==
=== Singles ===
(Austria) Jürgen Melzer def. (France) Gaël Monfils, 6–3, 2–1, ret.

=== Doubles ===
(Canada) Daniel Nestor / (India) Leander Paes def. (Philippines) Treat Huey / (United Kingdom) Dominic Inglot, 7-6^{(12-10)}, 7-5
