= 2019 US Open Series =

In tennis, the 2019 US Open Series was the sixteenth edition of the US Open Series, which comprised a group of hard court tournaments that started on July 22, 2019 in Atlanta and concluded in Winston-Salem on August 25, 2019. This edition consisted of four separate men's tournaments and two women's tournaments, with the Western & Southern Open hosting both a men's and women's event. The series was headlined by two ATP Tour Masters 1000 and two WTA Premier 5 events.

== Tournament Schedule ==
Legend
Grand Slam Event
ATP Masters 1000 and WTA Premier 5
ATP World Tour 500 and WTA Premier
ATP World Tour 250 and WTA International

Week	Date	Men's Events	Women's Events
1	July 22 – July 28	Atlanta; BB&T Atlanta Open; 2019 Champion: (Australia) Alex de Minaur	No Series Event Held This Week
2	July 29 – August 4	Washington, D.C. Citi Open; 2019 Champion: (Australia) Nick Kyrgios	San Jose; Silicon Valley Classic; 2019 Champion: (China) Zheng Saisai
3	August 5 – August 11	Montreal; Rogers Cup presented by National Bank; 2019 Champion: (Spain) Rafael Nadal	Toronto; Rogers Cup presented by National Bank; 2019 Champion: (Canada) Bianca Andreescu
4	August 12 – August 18	Cincinnati; Western & Southern Open; 2019 Champion: (Russia) Daniil Medvedev	Cincinnati; Western & Southern Open; 2019 Champion: (United States) Madison Keys
5	August 19 – August 25	Winston-Salem; Winston-Salem Open; 2019 Champion: (Poland) Hubert Hurkacz	No Series Event Held This Week
6–7	August 26 – September 8	New York; US Open; 2019 Champion: (Spain) Rafael Nadal	New York; US Open; 2019 Champion: (Canada) Bianca Andreescu

== Week 1 ==
=== ATP – BB&T Atlanta Open ===
John Isner was the defending champion, but he lost in the second round to Reilly Opelka.

Alex de Minaur won the title, defeating Taylor Fritz in the final, 6–3, 7–6^{(7–2)}.

==== Main Draw Finals ====
Quarterfinals
(United States) Reilly Opelka	7^{7}	7
(United Kingdom) Dan Evans	6^{3}	5
3	(Australia) Alex de Minaur	6	3
(Australia) Bernard Tomic	2	0^{r}
(United Kingdom) Cameron Norrie	7	6
(Australia) Alexei Popyrin	5	4
(Serbia) Miomir Kecmanović	1	6^{1}
2	(United States) Taylor Fritz	6	7^{7}

Semifinals
(United States) Reilly Opelka	6^{4}	7^{7}	3
3	(Australia) Alex de Minaur	7^{7}	6^{5}	6
(United Kingdom) Cameron Norrie	1	6	3
2	(United States) Taylor Fritz	6	3	6

Finals
3	(Australia) Alex de Minaur	6	7^{7}
2	(United States) Taylor Fritz	3	6^{2}

== Week 2 ==
=== ATP – Citi Open (Washington, D.C.) ===
Alexander Zverev was the two-time defending champion but chose not to defend his title.

Nick Kyrgios won the title, defeating Daniil Medvedev in the final 7–6^{(8–6)}, 7–6^{(7–4)}.

==== Main Draw Finals ====
Quarterfinals
1	(Greece) Stefanos Tsitsipas	7	6
10	(France) Benoît Paire	5	0
LL	(Slovakia) Norbert Gombos	3	3
(Australia) Nick Kyrgios	6	6
6	(Croatia) Marin Čilić	4	6^{7}
3	(Russia) Daniil Medvedev	6	7^{9}
LL	(Germany) Peter Gojowczyk	6	4	6
13	(United Kingdom) Kyle Edmund	3	6	3

Semifinals
1	(Greece) Stefanos Tsitsipas	4	6	6^{7}
(Australia) Nick Kyrgios	6	3	7^{9}
3	(Russia) Daniil Medvedev	6	6
LL	(Germany) Peter Gojowczyk	2	2

Final
(Australia) Nick Kyrgios	7^{8}	7^{7}
3	(Russia) Daniil Medvedev	6^{6}	6^{4}

=== WTA – Silicon Valley Classic (San Jose) ===
Mihaela Buzărnescu was the defending champion, but lost to Daria Kasatkina in the first round.

Zheng Saisai won the title, defeating Aryna Sabalenka in the final, 6–3, 7–6^{(7–3)}.

==== Main Draw Finals ====
Quarterfinals
1	(Ukraine) Elina Svitolina	6	6^{3}	3
7	(Greece) Maria Sakkari	1	7^{7}	6
4	(United States) Amanda Anisimova	7	5	4
(China) Zheng Saisai	5	7	6
5	(Croatia) Donna Vekić	7	6
Q	(United States) Kristie Ahn	5	0
6	(Spain) Carla Suárez Navarro	6	2	4
2	(Belarus) Aryna Sabalenka	3	6	6

Semifinals
7	(Greece) Maria Sakkari	6^{5}	2
(China) Zheng Saisai	7^{7}	6
5	(Croatia) Donna Vekić	4	3
2	(Belarus) Aryna Sabalenka	6	6

Final
(China) Zheng Saisai	6	7^{7}
2	(Belarus) Aryna Sabalenka	3	6^{3}

== Week 3 ==
=== ATP – Rogers Cup (Montreal) ===
Rafael Nadal was the defending champion and successfully defended his title by defeating Daniil Medvedev 6−3, 6−0 in the final.

==== Main Draw Finals ====
Quarterfinals
1	(Spain) Rafael Nadal	2	6	6
7	(Italy) Fabio Fognini	6	1	2
16	(France) Gaël Monfils	6	3	7^{7}
10	(Spain) Roberto Bautista Agut	4	6	6^{2}
6	(Russia) Karen Khachanov	6	6
3	(Germany) Alexander Zverev	3	3
8	(Russia) Daniil Medvedev	6	6
2	(Austria) Dominic Thiem	3	1

Semifinals
1	(Spain) Rafael Nadal	w/o
16	(France) Gaël Monfils
6	(Russia) Karen Khachanov	1	6^{6}
8	(Russia) Daniil Medvedev	6	7^{8}

Final
1	(Spain) Rafael Nadal	6	6
8	(Russia) Daniil Medvedev	3	0

=== WTA – Rogers Cup (Toronto) ===
Simona Halep was the defending champion, but she retired in the quarterfinals against Marie Bouzková.

Bianca Andreescu won the title, defeating Serena Williams in the final 3–1, ret., becoming the first Canadian to win the event since 1969.

==== Main Draw Finals ====
Quarterfinals
(United States) Sofia Kenin	7^{7}	6
6	(Ukraine) Elina Svitolina	6^{2}	4
3	(Czech Republic) Karolína Plíšková	0	6	4
(Canada) Bianca Andreescu	6	2	6
Q	(Czech Republic) Marie Bouzková	6	0
4	(Romania) Simona Halep	4	0^{r}
8	(United States) Serena Williams	6	6
2	(Japan) Naomi Osaka	3	4

Semifinals
(United States) Sofia Kenin	4	6^{5}
(Canada) Bianca Andreescu	6	7^{7}
Q	(Czech Republic) Marie Bouzková	6	3	3
8	(United States) Serena Williams	1	6	6

Final
(Canada) Bianca Andreescu	3
8	(United States) Serena Williams	1^{r}

== Week 4 ==
=== ATP – Western & Southern Open (Cincinnati) ===
Novak Djokovic was the defending champion, but lost in the Semifinals to Daniil Medvedev.

Medvedev went on to win his first ATP Masters 1000 title, defeating David Goffin in the final, 7–6^{(7–3)}, 6–4.

==== Main Draw Finals ====
Quarterfinals
1	(Serbia) Novak Djokovic	7^{7}	6
(France) Lucas Pouille	6^{2}	1
Q	(Russia) Andrey Rublev	2	3
9	(Russia) Daniil Medvedev	6	6
11	(Spain) Roberto Bautista Agut	6^{2}	6	2
PR	(France) Richard Gasquet	7^{7}	3	6
Q	(Japan) Yoshihito Nishioka
16	(Belgium) David Goffin	w/o

Semifinals
1	(Serbia) Novak Djokovic	6	3	3
9	(Russia) Daniil Medvedev	3	6	6
PR	(France) Richard Gasquet	3	4
16	(Belgium) David Goffin	6	6

Final
9	(Russia) Daniil Medvedev	7^{7}	6
16	(Belgium) David Goffin	6^{3}	4

=== WTA – Western & Southern Open (Cincinnati) ===
Kiki Bertens was the defending champion, but lost in the second round to Venus Williams.

Madison Keys won the title, defeating Svetlana Kuznetsova in the final, 7–5, 7–6^{(7–5)}.

==== Main Draw Finals ====
Quarterfinals
1	(Australia) Ashleigh Barty	5	6	6
(Greece) Maria Sakkari	7	2	0
3	(Czech Republic) Karolína Plíšková	6	6^{2}	3
WC	(Russia) Svetlana Kuznetsova	3	7^{7}	6
(United States) Venus Williams	2	3
16	(United States) Madison Keys	6	6
(United States) Sofia Kenin	6	1	2
2	(Japan) Naomi Osaka	4	6	0^{r}

Semifinals
1	(Australia) Ashleigh Barty	2	4
WC	(Russia) Svetlana Kuznetsova	6	6
16	(United States) Madison Keys	7	6
(United States) Sofia Kenin	5	4

Final
WC	(Russia) Svetlana Kuznetsova	5	6^{5}
16	(United States) Madison Keys	7	7^{7}

== Week 5 ==
=== ATP – Winston-Salem Open ===
Daniil Medvedev was the defending champion, but chose not to participate this year.

Hubert Hurkacz won his first ATP Tour title, defeating Benoît Paire in the final, 6–3, 3–6, 6–3.

==== Main Draw Finals ====
Quarterfinals
1	(France) Benoît Paire	7^{7}	1	6
11	(Spain) Pablo Carreño Busta	6^{5}	6	3
14	(Australia) John Millman	6	6^{5}	4
(United States) Steve Johnson	4	7^{7}	6
10/WC	(United States) Frances Tiafoe	6	6^{1}	1
3	(Poland) Hubert Hurkacz	4	7^{7}	6
(Russia) Andrey Rublev	3	6^{4}
2/WC	(Canada) Denis Shapovalov	6	7^{7}

Semifinals
1	(France) Benoît Paire	1	6	6
(United States) Steve Johnson	6	0	0
3	(Poland) Hubert Hurkacz	6	6
2/WC	(Canada) Denis Shapovalov	3	4

Final
1	(France) Benoît Paire	3	6	3
3	(Poland) Hubert Hurkacz	6	3	6

== Weeks 6–7 ==
=== ATP – US Open (New York) ===
Novak Djokovic was the defending champion, but he retired in the fourth round against Stan Wawrinka.

Rafael Nadal won the title, defeating Daniil Medvedev in the final, 7–5, 6–3, 5–7, 4–6, 6–4.

==== Main Draw Finals ====
Quarterfinals
23	(Switzerland) Stan Wawrinka	6^{6}	3	6	1
5	(Russia) Daniil Medvedev	7^{7}	6	3	6
3	(Switzerland) Roger Federer	6	4	6	4	2
(Bulgaria) Grigor Dimitrov	3	6	3	6	6
24	(Italy) Matteo Berrettini	3	6	6	3	7^{7}
13	(France) Gaël Monfils	6	3	2	6	6^{5}
20	(Argentina) Diego Schwartzman	4	5	2
2	(Spain) Rafael Nadal	6	7	6

Semifinals
5	(Russia) Daniil Medvedev	7^{7}	6	6
(Bulgaria) Grigor Dimitrov	6^{5}	4	3
24	(Italy) Matteo Berrettini	6^{6}	4	1
2	(Spain) Rafael Nadal	7^{8}	6	6

Final
5	(Russia) Daniil Medvedev	5	3	7	6	4
2	(Spain) Rafael Nadal	7	6	5	4	6

=== WTA – US Open (New York) ===
Naomi Osaka was the defending champion, but she was defeated in the fourth round by Belinda Bencic.

Bianca Andreescu won the title, defeating Serena Williams in the final, 6–3, 7–5.

==== Main Draw Finals ====
Quarterfinals
13	(Switzerland) Belinda Bencic	7^{7}	6
23	(Croatia) Donna Vekić	6^{5}	3
15	(Canada) Bianca Andreescu	3	6	6
25	(Belgium) Elise Mertens	6	2	3
5	(Ukraine) Elina Svitolina	6	6
16	(United Kingdom) Johanna Konta	4	4
8	(United States) Serena Williams	6	6
18	(China) Wang Qiang	1	0

Semifinals
13	(Switzerland) Belinda Bencic	6^{3}	5
15	(Canada) Bianca Andreescu	7^{7}	7
5	(Ukraine) Elina Svitolina	3	1
8	(United States) Serena Williams	6	6

Final
15	(Canada) Bianca Andreescu	6	7
8	(United States) Serena Williams	3	5
