= 2014 Winston-Salem Open – Doubles =

Doubles
- 2014 Winston-Salem Open

Final
- Champions: (Colombia) Juan Sebastián Cabal (Colombia) Robert Farah
- Runners-up: (United Kingdom) Jamie Murray (Australia) John Peers
- Score: 6–3, 6–4

Events
Singles	Doubles
← 2013 ·	Winston-Salem Open	· 2015 →

Daniel Nestor and Leander Paes were the defending champions but chose not to participate together. Nestor played alongside Rohan Bopanna, but they lost in the first round to Juan Sebastián Cabal and Robert Farah. Paes teamed up with David Marrero, but they retired in the first round against Sam Groth and Chris Guccione.
Cabal and Farah won the title, defeating Jamie Murray and John Peers in the final, 6–3, 6–4.

== Seeds ==
1. (Spain) David Marrero / (India) Leander Paes (first round, retired because of Marrero's back injury)
2. (India) Rohan Bopanna / (Canada) Daniel Nestor (first round)
3. (United Kingdom) Jamie Murray / (Australia) John Peers (final)
4. (Philippines) Treat Huey / (United Kingdom) Dominic Inglot (withdrew because of Inglot's abdominal injury)

== Draw ==
=== Key ===
- Q = Qualifier
- WC = Wild card
- LL = Lucky loser
- Alt = Alternate
- SE = Special exempt
- PR = Protected ranking
- ITF = ITF entry
- JE = Junior exempt
- w/o = Walkover
- r = Retired
- d = Defaulted
- SR = Special ranking

=== Draw ===
First round
1	(Spain) D Marrero (India) L Paes	6^{5}	0^{r}
(Australia) S Groth (Australia) C Guccione	7^{7}	0
WC	(Austria) J Melzer (Czech Republic) L Rosol	6^{3}	6	[4]
(Spain) P Andújar (Spain) M Granollers	7^{7}	2	[10]
3	(United Kingdom) J Murray (Australia) J Peers	6	6
(Spain) G García-López (Austria) P Oswald	4	4
(Poland) M Fyrstenberg (Poland) M Matkowski	6^{5}	6	[10]
PR	(United Kingdom) C Fleming (United Kingdom) R Hutchins	7^{7}	3	[2]
(Argentina) F Delbonis (Argentina) L Mayer	6^{4}	5
WC	(United States) N Monroe (United States) D Young	7^{7}	7
(Mexico) S González (Austria) O Marach	1	6	[9]
Alt	(Romania) F Mergea (Portugal) J Sousa	6	4	[11]
(United States) S Lipsky (Belarus) M Mirnyi	5	4
(Netherlands) R Haase (France) N Mahut	7	6
(Colombia) JS Cabal (Colombia) R Farah	7^{7}	7^{7}
2	(India) R Bopanna (Canada) D Nestor	6^{3}	6^{2}

Quarterfinals
(Australia) S Groth (Australia) C Guccione	6^{4}	5
(Spain) P Andújar (Spain) M Granollers	7^{7}	7
3	(United Kingdom) J Murray (Australia) J Peers	6	6
(Poland) M Fyrstenberg (Poland) M Matkowski	3	4
WC	(United States) N Monroe (United States) D Young	2	6	[10]
Alt	(Romania) F Mergea (Portugal) J Sousa	6	1	[12]
(Netherlands) R Haase (France) N Mahut	4	4
(Colombia) JS Cabal (Colombia) R Farah	6	6

Semifinals
(Spain) P Andújar (Spain) M Granollers	7	2	[7]
3	(United Kingdom) J Murray (Australia) J Peers	5	6	[10]
Alt	(Romania) F Mergea (Portugal) J Sousa	2	3
(Colombia) JS Cabal (Colombia) R Farah	6	6

Final
3	(United Kingdom) J Murray (Australia) J Peers	3	4
(Colombia) JS Cabal (Colombia) R Farah	6	6
