= 2014 Winston-Salem Open – Singles =

Singles
- 2014 Winston-Salem Open

Final
- Champion: (Czech Republic) Lukáš Rosol
- Runner-up: (Poland) Jerzy Janowicz
- Score: 3–6, 7–6^{(7–3)}, 7–5

Events
Singles	Doubles
- Winston-Salem Open

Jürgen Melzer was the defending champion, but lost to qualifier David Goffin in the first round.

Lukáš Rosol won the title, defeating Jerzy Janowicz in the final, 3–6, 7–6^{(7–3)}, 7–5, en route saving 2 match points in the third set.

== Seeds ==
All seeds received a bye into the second round.

1. (United States) John Isner (quarterfinals, withdrew due to an ankle injury)
2. (South Africa) Kevin Anderson (third round)
3. (Spain) Tommy Robredo (second round)
4. (Argentina) Leonardo Mayer (second round)
5. (Spain) Guillermo García López (quarterfinals)
6. (Portugal) João Sousa (second round)
7. (Czech Republic) Lukáš Rosol (champion)
8. (Spain) Marcel Granollers (third round)
9. (Chinese Taipei) Lu Yen-hsun (semifinals)
10. (Spain) Pablo Andújar (third round)
11. (United States) Donald Young (third round)
12. (France) Édouard Roger-Vasselin (third round)
13. (Kazakhstan) Mikhail Kukushkin (third round)
14. (Italy) Andreas Seppi (quarterfinals)
15. (Finland) Jarkko Nieminen (third round)
16. (United States) Steve Johnson (second round)

Click on the seed number of a player to go to their draw section.

== Draw ==
Key

- Q = Qualifier
- WC = Wild card
- LL = Lucky loser
- Alt = Alternate
- ITF = ITF entry
- PR = Protected ranking
- SR = Special ranking
- SE = Special exempt
- JE = Junior exempt
- JR = Junior Accelerator Programme entrant
- CO = College Accelerator Programme entrant
- NG = Next Gen Accelerator Program entrant
- w/o = Walkover
- r = Retired
- d = Defaulted

=== Finals ===
Quarterfinals
1	(United States) John Isner
7	(Czech Republic) Lukáš Rosol	w/o
14	(Italy) Andreas Seppi	4	4
9	(Chinese Taipei) Lu Yen-hsun	6	6
(Poland) Jerzy Janowicz	6	6
Q	(Belgium) David Goffin	4	2
5	(Spain) Guillermo García López	7^{7}	2	4
(United States) Sam Querrey	6^{3}	6	6

Semifinals
7	(Czech Republic) Lukáš Rosol	7	4	6
9	(Chinese Taipei) Lu Yen-hsun	5	6	4
(Poland) Jerzy Janowicz	4	7	6
(United States) Sam Querrey	6	5	4

Final
7	(Czech Republic) Lukáš Rosol	3	7^{7}	7
(Poland) Jerzy Janowicz	6	6^{3}	5

=== Top half ===
==== Section 1 ====
First round
(United States) B Klahn	6	0	7^{7}
WC	(United States) N Rubin	2	6	6^{5}
(Netherlands) R Haase	6	2	6
(France) B Paire	4	6	2
(Netherlands) I Sijsling	7^{7}	6
(Kazakhstan) A Golubev	6^{5}	3
WC	(United States) R Harrison	6	6
(Germany) J-L Struff	4	2

Second round
1	(United States) J Isner	7^{7}	6
(United States) B Klahn	6^{5}	2
(Netherlands) R Haase	7	6^{2}	4
13	(Kazakhstan) M Kukushkin	5	7^{7}	6
10	(Spain) P Andújar	6	6
(Netherlands) I Sijsling	4	3
WC	(United States) R Harrison	6	1^{r}
7	(Czech Republic) L Rosol	3	2

Third round
1	(United States) J Isner	6	7^{7}
13	(Kazakhstan) M Kukushkin	1	6^{3}
10	(Spain) P Andújar	6	2	2
7	(Czech Republic) L Rosol	1	6	6

Quarterfinals
1	(United States) J Isner
7	(Czech Republic) L Rosol	w/o

==== Section 2 ====
First round
(Slovenia) B Kavčič	3	2
(France) N Mahut	6	6
(Slovakia) M Kližan	6^{5}	4
(Argentina) F Delbonis	7^{7}	6
Q	(United States) W Odesnik	6^{4}	3
(Slovenia) B Rola	7^{7}	6
WC	(United States) R Ginepri	3	5
(France) P-H Mathieu	6	7

Second round
3	(Spain) T Robredo	1	6^{0}
(France) N Mahut	6	7^{7}
(Argentina) F Delbonis	5	7^{7}	2
14	(Italy) A Seppi	7	6^{5}	6
9	(Chinese Taipei) Y-h Lu	6	7
(Slovenia) B Rola	4	5
(France) P-H Mathieu	3	3
8	(Spain) M Granollers	6	6

Third round
(France) N Mahut	4	6^{7}
14	(Italy) A Seppi	6	7^{9}
9	(Chinese Taipei) Y-h Lu	6	6
8	(Spain) M Granollers	1	2

Quarterfinals
14	(Italy) A Seppi	4	4
9	(Chinese Taipei) Y-h Lu	6	6

=== Bottom half ===
==== Section 3 ====
First round
(Poland) J Janowicz	6	6
(Argentina) C Berlocq	1	4
Q	(United States) M Giron	4	4
(Kazakhstan) A Nedovyesov	6	6
(Germany) B Becker	6	2	6
(Spain) P Carreño Busta	2	6	1
Q	(Belgium) D Goffin	6	6
(Austria) J Melzer	3	4

Second round
6	(Portugal) J Sousa	1	6	6^{5}
(Poland) J Janowicz	6	3	7^{7}
(Kazakhstan) A Nedovyesov	6^{9}	7^{7}	4
12	(France) É Roger-Vasselin	7^{11}	6^{5}	6
15	(Finland) J Nieminen	7	6
(Germany) B Becker	5	4
Q	(Belgium) D Goffin	6	6
4	(Argentina) L Mayer	3	1

Third round
(Poland) J Janowicz	4	6	6
12	(France) É Roger-Vasselin	6	3	4
15	(Finland) J Nieminen	4	6	4
Q	(Belgium) D Goffin	6	4	6

Quarterfinals
(Poland) J Janowicz	6	6
Q	(Belgium) D Goffin	4	2

==== Section 4 ====
First round
(Germany) D Brown	6	6
(Colombia) A González	3	2
(Canada) F Dancevic	7	3	6
(Brazil) T Bellucci	5	6	2
(United States) S Querrey	7^{7}	6
(Spain) P Riba	6^{5}	4
Q	(Bosnia and Herzegovina) D Džumhur	2	2
(France) A Mannarino	6	6

Second round
5	(Spain) G García López	6^{5}	6	6
(Germany) D Brown	7^{7}	2	2
(Canada) F Dancevic	1	3
11	(United States) D Young	6	6
16	(United States) S Johnson	4	3
(United States) S Querrey	6	6
(France) A Mannarino	3	6	4
2/WC	(South Africa) K Anderson	6	2	6

Third round
5	(Spain) G García López	6^{4}	6	7^{8}
11	(United States) D Young	7^{7}	3	6^{6}
(United States) S Querrey	7^{7}	6
2/WC	(South Africa) K Anderson	6^{4}	4

Quarterfinals
5	(Spain) G García López	7^{7}	2	4
(United States) S Querrey	6^{3}	6	6

== Qualifying ==
=== Seeds ===
The top five seeds received a bye into second round.

1. (Belgium) David Goffin (qualified)
2. (Italy) Simone Bolelli (qualifying competition)
3. (Australia) Sam Groth (second round)
4. (Bosnia and Herzegovina) Damir Džumhur (qualified)
5. (United States) Wayne Odesnik (qualified)
6. (United States) Jason Jung (qualifying competition)
7. (Zimbabwe) Takanyi Garanganga (second round)
8. (United States) Kevin King (first round)

=== Qualifiers ===
1. (Belgium) David Goffin
2. (United States) Wayne Odesnik
3. (United States) Marcos Giron
4. (Bosnia and Herzegovina) Damir Džumhur

=== Qualifying draw ===
==== First qualifier ====
First round
(Spain) David Marrero	4	3
WC	(New Zealand) Adam Lee	6	6
(United States) Quinton Vega	5	1
WC	(United States) Jonathan Ho	7	6
(Germany) Andre Begemann	6	4	5
6	(United States) Jason Jung	3	6	7

Second round
1	(Belgium) David Goffin	6	6
WC	(New Zealand) Adam Lee	2	0
WC	(United States) Jonathan Ho	3	0
6	(United States) Jason Jung	6	6

Qualifying competition
1	(Belgium) David Goffin	7	6
6	(United States) Jason Jung	5	1

==== Second qualifier ====
First round					Second round				Qualifying competition
					2	(Italy) Simone Bolelli	7^{9}	6
(United States) Eric Quigley		6	5	6		(United States) Eric Quigley	6^{7}	4
(South Africa) Fritz Wolmarans		3	7	4					2	(Italy) Simone Bolelli	6	3	2
	(United States) Nicholas Monroe	6	7^{7}						5	(United States) Wayne Odesnik	4	6	6
WC	(Uzbekistan) Maksim Kan	1	6^{5}			(United States) Nicholas Monroe	3	1
					5	(United States) Wayne Odesnik	6	6

==== Third qualifier ====
First round
(Canada) Pavel Krainik	6^{9}	6	2
(Croatia) Mate Pavić	7^{11}	1	6
(United States) Nicolas Meister	6	6
WC	(United States) Anthony Delcore	4	1
(United States) Marcos Giron	6	6
8	(United States) Kevin King	4	4

Second round
3	(Australia) Sam Groth	6^{5}	4
(Croatia) Mate Pavić	7^{7}	6
(United States) Nicolas Meister	1	6	4
(United States) Marcos Giron	6	2	6

Qualifying competition
(Croatia) Mate Pavić	6	3	4
(United States) Marcos Giron	3	6	6

==== Fourth qualifier ====
First round
(United States) Sekou Bangoura	7^{7}	6
(United Kingdom) Colin Fleming	6^{1}	2
(Austria) Philipp Oswald	6	6
(Romania) Florin Mergea	0	3
(United States) Andrew Carter	4	6	4
7	(Zimbabwe) Takanyi Garanganga	6	4	6

Second round
4	(Bosnia and Herzegovina) Damir Džumhur	6	5	6
(United States) Sekou Bangoura	3	7	3
(Austria) Philipp Oswald	6	3	6
7	(Zimbabwe) Takanyi Garanganga	4	6	1

Qualifying competition
4	(Bosnia and Herzegovina) Damir Džumhur	6	6
(Austria) Philipp Oswald	4	4
