= 2016 Winston-Salem Open – Singles =

Singles
- 2016 Winston-Salem Open

Final
- Champion: (Spain) Pablo Carreño Busta
- Runner-up: (Spain) Roberto Bautista Agut
- Score: 6–7^{(6–8)}, 7–6^{(7–1)}, 6–4

Details
- Draw: 48 (16Q)
- Seeds: 16

Events
Singles	Doubles
- Winston-Salem Open

Kevin Anderson was the defending champion, but lost in the second round to Jiří Veselý.

Pablo Carreño Busta won his maiden ATP title, defeating Roberto Bautista Agut in the final, 6–7^{(6–8)}, 7–6^{(7–1)}, 6–4.

== Seeds ==
All seeds receive a bye into the second round.

1. (France) Richard Gasquet (quarterfinals)
2. (Spain) Roberto Bautista Agut (final)
3. (Uruguay) Pablo Cuevas (third round)
4. (United States) Steve Johnson (third round)
5. (South Africa) Kevin Anderson (second round)
6. (United States) Sam Querrey (third round)
7. (France) Gilles Simon (second round)
8. (Spain) Albert Ramos Viñolas (second round)

9. (Serbia) Viktor Troicki (semifinals)
10. (Portugal) João Sousa (second round)
11. (Italy) Paolo Lorenzi (second round)
12. (Russia) Andrey Kuznetsov (quarterfinals)
13. (Argentina) Federico Delbonis (second round)
14. (Cyprus) Marcos Baghdatis (third round)
15. (Spain) Fernando Verdasco (quarterfinals)
16. (Spain) Pablo Carreño Busta (champion)

Click on the seed number of a player to go to their draw section.

== Draw ==
Key

- Q = Qualifier
- WC = Wild card
- LL = Lucky loser
- Alt = Alternate
- ITF = ITF entry
- PR = Protected ranking
- SR = Special ranking
- SE = Special exempt
- JE = Junior exempt
- JR = Junior Accelerator Programme entrant
- CO = College Accelerator Programme entrant
- NG = Next Gen Accelerator Program entrant
- w/o = Walkover
- r = Retired
- d = Defaulted

=== Finals ===
Quarterfinals
1	(France) Richard Gasquet	5	3
(Australia) John Millman	7	6
16	(Spain) Pablo Carreño Busta	6	6
12	(Russia) Andrey Kuznetsov	4	3
9	(Serbia) Viktor Troicki	6	3	6
15	(Spain) Fernando Verdasco	4	6	4
(Chinese Taipei) Lu Yen-hsun	3	2
2/WC	(Spain) Roberto Bautista Agut	6	6

Semifinals
(Australia) John Millman	4	6^{5}
16	(Spain) Pablo Carreño Busta	6	7^{7}
9	(Serbia) Viktor Troicki	5	7^{7}	2
2/WC	(Spain) Roberto Bautista Agut	7	6^{2}	6

Final
16	(Spain) Pablo Carreño Busta	6^{6}	7^{7}	6
2/WC	(Spain) Roberto Bautista Agut	7^{8}	6^{1}	4

=== Top half ===
==== Section 1 ====
First round
(Portugal) G Elias	3	6^{3}
(United Kingdom) D Evans	6	7^{7}
(France) P-H Mathieu	6	2	2
(France) S Robert	4	6	6
(Russia) E Donskoy	6	4	2
WC	(United States) B Fratangelo	3	6	6
Q	(Japan) Y Nishioka	6	3	4
(Australia) J Millman	4	6	6

Second round
1	(France) R Gasquet	6	4	6
(United Kingdom) D Evans	4	6	3
(France) S Robert	6	5	6
13	(Argentina) F Delbonis	4	7	4
11	(Italy) P Lorenzi	6	2	3
WC	(United States) B Fratangelo	4	6	6
(Australia) J Millman	4	7	6
8	(Spain) A Ramos Viñolas	6	5	3

Third round
1	(France) R Gasquet	6	6
(France) S Robert	1	3
WC	(United States) B Fratangelo	7	0	3
(Australia) J Millman	5	6	6

Quarterfinals
1	(France) R Gasquet	5	3
(Australia) J Millman	7	6

==== Section 2 ====
First round
(Tunisia) M Jaziri	6	6
Q	(Moldova) R Albot	2	4
(Germany) J-L Struff	6	6
(Italy) A Seppi	2	3
Q	(Australia) J Duckworth	6^{8}	6	3
(Russia) M Youzhny	7^{10}	1	6
(Czech Republic) J Veselý	3	6	6
LL	(Netherlands) T van Rijthoven	6	3	3

Second round
3	(Uruguay) P Cuevas	7	6
(Tunisia) M Jaziri	5	1
(Germany) J-L Struff	4	5
16	(Spain) P Carreño Busta	6	7
12	(Russia) A Kuznetsov	w/o
(Russia) M Youzhny
(Czech Republic) J Veselý	7^{7}	6
5	(South Africa) K Anderson	6^{5}	4

Third round
3	(Uruguay) P Cuevas	3	6^{1}
16	(Spain) P Carreño Busta	6	7^{7}
12	(Russia) A Kuznetsov	5
(Czech Republic) J Veselý	5^{r}

Quarterfinals
16	(Spain) P Carreño Busta	6	6
12	(Russia) A Kuznetsov	4	3

=== Bottom half ===
==== Section 3 ====
First round
(Bosnia and Herzegovina) D Džumhur	6^{0}	1
(Spain) G García López	7^{7}	6
(United Kingdom) K Edmund	7	7^{7}
WC	(United States) R Ram	5	6^{5}
(United States) T Fritz	6	6
WC	(United States) F Tiafoe	1	4
(Dominican Republic) V Estrella Burgos	4	6	1
(Czech Republic) L Rosol	6	1	6

Second round
6	(United States) S Querrey	6	6^{5}	7
(Spain) G García López	3	7^{7}	5
(United Kingdom) K Edmund	3	5
9	(Serbia) V Troicki	6	7
15	(Spain) F Verdasco	3	6	6
(United States) T Fritz	6	3	2
(Czech Republic) L Rosol	3	2
4	(United States) S Johnson	6	6

Third round
6	(United States) S Querrey	2	6^{5}
9	(Serbia) V Troicki	6	7^{7}
15	(Spain) F Verdasco	6	7^{9}
4	(United States) S Johnson	4	6^{7}

Quarterfinals
9	(Serbia) V Troicki	6	3	6
15	(Spain) F Verdasco	4	6	4

==== Section 4 ====
First round
(Argentina) D Schwartzman	6	6
(Kazakhstan) M Kukushkin	0	2
(Chinese Taipei) Y-h Lu	7^{7}	6
(Ukraine) I Marchenko	6^{5}	3
(United States) D Young	6	6
(France) P-H Herbert	4	1
(United Kingdom) A Bedene	3	7^{7}	6
Q	(Republic of Ireland) J McGee	6	6^{5}	2

Second round
7	(France) G Simon	6^{2}	1
(Argentina) D Schwartzman	7^{7}	6
(Chinese Taipei) Y-h Lu	6	6
10	(Portugal) J Sousa	2	4
14	(Cyprus) M Baghdatis	6	4	6
(United States) D Young	4	6	4
(United Kingdom) A Bedene	6	3	3
2/WC	(Spain) R Bautista Agut	4	6	6

Third round
(Argentina) D Schwartzman	4	0
(Chinese Taipei) Y-h Lu	6	6
14	(Cyprus) M Baghdatis	6	3	1
2/WC	(Spain) R Bautista Agut	4	6	6

Quarterfinals
(Chinese Taipei) Y-h Lu	3	2
2/WC	(Spain) R Bautista Agut	6	6

== Qualifying ==
=== Seeds ===
1. (Japan) Yoshihito Nishioka (qualified)
2. (Moldova) Radu Albot (qualified)
3. (Germany) Michael Berrer (qualifying competition)
4. (Australia) James Duckworth (qualified)
5. (Colombia) Alejandro Falla (first round, retired)
6. (Republic of Ireland) James McGee (qualified)
7. (United Kingdom) Liam Broady (qualifying competition)
8. (Netherlands) Tim van Rijthoven (qualifying competition, lucky loser)

=== Qualifiers ===
1. (Japan) Yoshihito Nishioka
2. (Moldova) Radu Albot
3. (Republic of Ireland) James McGee
4. (Australia) James Duckworth

=== Lucky losers ===
1. (Netherlands) Tim van Rijthoven

=== Qualifying draw ===
==== First qualifier ====
First round
1	(Japan) Yoshihito Nishioka	6	6
(Poland) Łukasz Kubot	4	4
WC	(United States) Dennis Uspensky	6	1	2
7	(United Kingdom) Liam Broady	2	6	6

Qualifying competition
1	(Japan) Yoshihito Nishioka	6	6
7	(United Kingdom) Liam Broady	2	1

==== Second qualifier ====
First round
2	(Moldova) Radu Albot	6	7
(United States) Wil Spencer	3	5
WC	(Tunisia) Skander Mansouri	3	6	2
8	(Netherlands) Tim van Rijthoven	6	4	6

Qualifying competition
2	(Moldova) Radu Albot	6	6
8	(Netherlands) Tim van Rijthoven	3	2

==== Third qualifier ====
First round
3	(Germany) Michael Berrer	5	6	7^{7}
Alt	(Netherlands) Matwé Middelkoop	7	4	6^{2}
(United States) Mackenzie McDonald	6^{3}	3
6	(Republic of Ireland) James McGee	7^{7}	6

Qualifying competition
3	(Germany) Michael Berrer	3	2
6	(Republic of Ireland) James McGee	6	6

==== Fourth qualifier ====
First round
4	(Australia) James Duckworth	6	6
(United States) Michael Mmoh	3	4
Alt	(Cyprus) Petros Chrysochos	6	0
5	(Colombia) Alejandro Falla	4	0^{r}

Qualifying competition
4	(Australia) James Duckworth	6	6
Alt	(Cyprus) Petros Chrysochos	2	2
