= 2019 Winston-Salem Open – Singles =

Singles
- 2019 Winston-Salem Open

Final
- Champion: (Poland) Hubert Hurkacz
- Runner-up: (France) Benoît Paire
- Score: 6–3, 3–6, 6–3

Details
- Draw: 48 (4 Q / 3 WC )
- Seeds: 16

Events
| Singles | Doubles |
| ← 2018 · | Winston-Salem Open | · 2021 → |

Daniil Medvedev was the defending champion, but chose not to participate this year.

Hubert Hurkacz won his first ATP Tour title, defeating Benoît Paire in the final, 6–3, 3–6, 6–3. Hurkacz became the first Polish man to win a Tour-level singles title since Wojtek Fibak in 1982.

Lee Duck-hee become the first deaf player to win a main draw match on the ATP Tour when he defeated Henri Laaksonen in the first round.

== Seeds ==
All seeds receive a bye into the second round.

1. (France) Benoît Paire (final)
2. (Canada) Denis Shapovalov (semifinals)
3. (Poland) Hubert Hurkacz (champion)
4. (Portugal) João Sousa (second round)
5. (United Kingdom) Dan Evans (second round)
6. (United States) Sam Querrey (third round)
7. (Italy) Lorenzo Sonego (third round)
8. (Serbia) Filip Krajinović (third round, retired)

9. (Spain) Albert Ramos Viñolas (second round)
10. (United States) Frances Tiafoe (quarterfinals)
11. (Spain) Pablo Carreño Busta (quarterfinals)
12. (Norway) Casper Ruud (third round)
13. (Serbia) Miomir Kecmanović (third round)
14. (Australia) John Millman (quarterfinals)
15. (France) Ugo Humbert (third round)
16. (Spain) Feliciano López (third round, retired)

Click on the seed number of a player to go to their draw section.

== Draw ==
=== Key ===
- Q = Qualifier
- WC = Wild card
- LL = Lucky loser
- Alt = Alternate
- ITF = ITF entry
- PR = Protected ranking
- SR = Special ranking
- SE = Special exempt
- JE = Junior exempt
- JR = Junior Accelerator Programme entrant
- CO = College Accelerator Programme entrant
- NG = Next Gen Accelerator Program entrant
- w/o = Walkover
- r = Retired
- d = Defaulted

=== Finals ===
Quarterfinals
1 | (France) Benoît Paire | 7^{7} | 1 | 6
11 | (Spain) Pablo Carreño Busta | 6^{5} | 6 | 3
14 | (Australia) John Millman | 6 | 6^{5} | 4
(United States) Steve Johnson | 4 | 7^{7} | 6
10/WC | (United States) Frances Tiafoe | 6 | 6^{1} | 1
3 | (Poland) Hubert Hurkacz | 4 | 7^{7} | 6
(Russia) Andrey Rublev | 3 | 6^{4}
2/WC | (Canada) Denis Shapovalov | 6 | 7^{7}

Semifinals
1 | (France) Benoît Paire | 1 | 6 | 6
(United States) Steve Johnson | 6 | 0 | 0
3 | (Poland) Hubert Hurkacz | 6 | 6
2/WC | (Canada) Denis Shapovalov | 3 | 4

Final
1 | (France) Benoît Paire | 3 | 6 | 3
3 | (Poland) Hubert Hurkacz | 6 | 3 | 6

=== Top half ===
==== Section 1 ====
First round
(India) P Gunneswaran | 6 | 6
PR | (Germany) C-M Stebe | 3 | 4
PR | (Israel) A Weintraub | 0 | 0
Q | (United States) B Fratangelo | 6 | 6
(Romania) M Copil | 6 | 3 | 6
(Slovakia) M Kližan | 4 | 6 | 3
(France) A Hoang | 7^{7} | 0 | 2
Q | (Bosnia and Herzegovina) D Džumhur | 6^{5} | 6 | 6

Second round
1 | (France) B Paire | 6 | 7
(India) P Gunneswaran | 3 | 5
Q | (United States) B Fratangelo | 6 | 3 | 2
15 | (France) U Humbert | 3 | 6 | 6
11 | (Spain) P Carreño Busta | 6 | 6^{3} | 6
(Romania) M Copil | 3 | 7^{7} | 4
Q | (Bosnia and Herzegovina) D Džumhur | 1 | 4
7 | (Italy) L Sonego | 6 | 6

Third round
1 | (France) B Paire | 3 | 7^{7} | 6
15 | (France) U Humbert | 6 | 6^{2} | 3
11 | (Spain) P Carreño Busta | 7^{9} | 6
7 | (Italy) L Sonego | 6^{7} | 0

Quarterfinals
1 | (France) B Paire | 7^{7} | 1 | 6
11 | (Spain) P Carreño Busta | 6^{5} | 6 | 3

==== Section 2 ====
First round
(United States) D Kudla | 4 | 6^{3}
(Netherlands) R Haase | 6 | 7^{7}
(Italy) M Cecchinato | 7^{7} | 1
(Kazakhstan) A Bublik | 6^{3} | 0^{r}
(South Africa) L Harris | 7^{7} | 4 | 6
(Spain) J Munar | 6^{5} | 6 | 1
(United States) S Johnson | 6 | 6
(France) C Moutet | 3 | 3

Second round
4 | (Portugal) J Sousa | 6 | 3 | 4
(Netherlands) R Haase | 4 | 6 | 6
(Italy) M Cecchinato | 7^{7} | 4 | 3
14 | (Australia) J Millman | 6^{5} | 6 | 6
12 | (Norway) C Ruud | 6 | 0
(South Africa) L Harris | 1 | 0^{r}
(United States) S Johnson | 6 | 6
5 | (United Kingdom) D Evans | 3 | 1

Third round
(Netherlands) R Haase | 3 | 4
14 | (Australia) J Millman | 6 | 6
12 | (Norway) C Ruud | 2 | 6^{5}
(United States) S Johnson | 6 | 7^{7}

Quarterfinals
14 | (Australia) J Millman | 6 | 6^{5} | 4
(United States) S Johnson | 4 | 7^{7} | 6

=== Bottom half ===
==== Section 3 ====
First round
WC | (Czech Republic) T Berdych | 6 | 3 | 6
(Italy) A Seppi | 1 | 6 | 3
Q | (United States) R Sarmiento | 1 | 6^{5}
(France) J Chardy | 6 | 7^{7}
(Spain) P Andújar | 6 | 6
(Chile) N Jarry | 4 | 2
(South Korea) D-h Lee | 7^{7} | 6
(Switzerland) H Laaksonen | 6^{4} | 1

Second round
8 | (Serbia) F Krajinović | 3 | 7 | 6
WC | (Czech Republic) T Berdych | 6 | 5 | 1
(France) J Chardy | 2^{r}
10/WC | (United States) F Tiafoe | 4
16 | (Spain) F López | 6 | 1 | 7
(Spain) P Andújar | 4 | 6 | 5
(South Korea) D-h Lee | 6 | 0 | 3
3 | (Poland) H Hurkacz | 4 | 6 | 6

Third round
8 | (Serbia) F Krajinović | 2 | 0^{r}
10/WC | (United States) F Tiafoe | 6 | 0
16 | (Spain) F López | 3 | 1^{r}
3 | (Poland) H Hurkacz | 6 | 3

Quarterfinals
10/WC | (United States) F Tiafoe | 6 | 6^{1} | 1
3 | (Poland) H Hurkacz | 4 | 7^{7} | 6

==== Section 4 ====
First round
Q | (United States) M Giron | 2 | 6 | 3
(Spain) R Carballés Baena | 6 | 2 | 6
(Italy) T Fabbiano | 4 | 2
(Russia) A Rublev | 6 | 6
(Brazil) T Monteiro | 7 | 4 | 6^{7}
(Australia) A Popyrin | 5 | 6 | 7^{9}
(United States) T Sandgren | 7^{10} | 7
WC | (United Kingdom) A Murray | 6^{8} | 5

Second round
6 | (United States) S Querrey | 6 | 7
(Spain) R Carballés Baena | 3 | 5
(Russia) A Rublev | 6^{5} | 6 | 6
9 | (Spain) A Ramos Viñolas | 7^{7} | 3 | 1
13 | (Serbia) M Kecmanović | 7^{7} | 6
(Australia) A Popyrin | 6^{5} | 3
(United States) T Sandgren | 2 | 4
2/WC | (Canada) D Shapovalov | 6 | 6

Third round
6 | (United States) S Querrey | 6^{4} | 6^{10}
(Russia) A Rublev | 7^{7} | 7^{12}
13 | (Serbia) M Kecmanović | 2 | 3
2/WC | (Canada) D Shapovalov | 6 | 6

Quarterfinals
(Russia) A Rublev | 3 | 6^{4}
2/WC | (Canada) D Shapovalov | 6 | 7^{7}

== Qualifying ==
=== Seeds ===
1. (Bosnia and Herzegovina) Damir Džumhur (qualified)
2. (United States) Bjorn Fratangelo (qualified)
3. (United States) Marcos Giron (qualified)
4. (United States) Christopher Eubanks (first round)
5. (Canada) Filip Peliwo (first round)
6. (El Salvador) Marcelo Arévalo (first round)
7. (Croatia) Borna Gojo (qualifying competition)
8. (Germany) Kevin Krawietz (first round)

=== Qualifiers ===
1. (Bosnia and Herzegovina) Damir Džumhur
2. (United States) Bjorn Fratangelo
3. (United States) Marcos Giron
4. (United States) Raymond Sarmiento

=== Qualifying draw ===
==== First qualifier ====
First round
1 | (Bosnia and Herzegovina) Damir Džumhur | 6 | 2 | 6
(United States) Kevin King | 4 | 6 | 1
Alt | (United States) Strong Kirchheimer | 4 | 6 | 6
8 | (Germany) Kevin Krawietz | 6 | 2 | 4

Qualifying competition
1 | (Bosnia and Herzegovina) Damir Džumhur | 4 | 6 | 6
Alt | (United States) Strong Kirchheimer | 6 | 2 | 1

==== Second qualifier ====
First round
2 | (United States) Bjorn Fratangelo | 6 | 6
Alt | (Austria) Jürgen Melzer | 4 | 4
WC | (Cyprus) Petros Chrysochos | 6 | 6
5 | (Canada) Filip Peliwo | 1 | 0

Qualifying competition
2 | (United States) Bjorn Fratangelo | 7 | 4 | 6
WC | (Cyprus) Petros Chrysochos | 5 | 6 | 1

==== Third qualifier ====
First round
3 | (United States) Marcos Giron | 6 | 6
(United States) Roy Smith | 2 | 0
WC | (Canada) Taha Baadi | 4 | 4
7 | (Croatia) Borna Gojo | 6 | 6

Qualifying competition
3 | (United States) Marcos Giron | 6 | 6
7 | (Croatia) Borna Gojo | 4 | 4

==== Fourth qualifier ====
First round
4 | (United States) Christopher Eubanks | 6 | 3 | 4
PR | (United States) Raymond Sarmiento | 3 | 6 | 6
(United States) Daniel Nguyen | 6 | 4 | 7^{7}
6 | (El Salvador) Marcelo Arévalo | 4 | 6 | 6^{3}

Qualifying competition
PR | (United States) Raymond Sarmiento | 6 | 6
(United States) Daniel Nguyen | 2 | 3
