= 2018 Winston-Salem Open – Doubles =

Doubles
- 2018 Winston-Salem Open

Final
- Champions: (Netherlands) Jean-Julien Rojer (Romania) Horia Tecău
- Runners-up: (United States) James Cerretani (India) Leander Paes
- Score: 6–4, 6–2

Events
Singles	Doubles
← 2017 ·	Winston-Salem Open	· 2019 →

Jean-Julien Rojer and Horia Tecău were the defending champions, and successfully defended their title, defeating James Cerretani and Leander Paes in the final, 6–4, 6–2.

== Seeds ==
1. (Poland) Łukasz Kubot / (Brazil) Marcelo Melo (first round)
2. (Netherlands) Jean-Julien Rojer / (Romania) Horia Tecău (champions)
3. (Japan) Ben McLachlan / (Germany) Jan-Lennard Struff (first round)
4. (Chile) Julio Peralta / (Argentina) Horacio Zeballos (first round)

== Draw ==
=== Key ===
- Q = Qualifier
- WC = Wild card
- LL = Lucky loser
- Alt = Alternate
- SE = Special exempt
- PR = Protected ranking
- ITF = ITF entry
- JE = Junior exempt
- w/o = Walkover
- r = Retired
- d = Defaulted
- SR = Special ranking

=== Draw ===
First round
1	(Poland) Ł Kubot (Brazil) M Melo	3	6	[5]
(Brazil) M Demoliner (Mexico) S González	6	3	[10]
Alt	(Belarus) M Mirnyi (Austria) P Oswald	3	7	[3]
(Pakistan) A-u-H Qureshi (New Zealand) A Sitak	6	5	[10]
3	(Japan) B McLachlan (Germany) J-L Struff	4	6	[9]
WC	(United States) J Cerretani (India) L Paes	6	3	[11]
(Argentina) M González (Spain) M López	6^{2}	6	[11]
(Czech Republic) R Jebavý (Netherlands) M Middelkoop	7^{7}	3	[9]
(Sweden) R Lindstedt (United States) R Ram	6	6
(United Kingdom) D Inglot (Croatia) F Škugor	2	4
(United Kingdom) J Salisbury (United Kingdom) N Skupski	7^{7}	6
4	(Chile) J Peralta (Argentina) H Zeballos	6^{3}	4
(New Zealand) M Daniell (Netherlands) W Koolhof	3	7^{7}	[12]
(United States) N Monroe (Mexico) MÁ Reyes-Varela	6	6^{3}	[10]
(Italy) M Cecchinato (Italy) A Seppi	4	4
2	(Netherlands) J-J Rojer (Romania) H Tecău	6	6

Quarterfinals
(Brazil) M Demoliner (Mexico) S González	4	3
(Pakistan) A-u-H Qureshi (New Zealand) A Sitak	6	6
WC	(United States) J Cerretani (India) L Paes	6	1	[10]
(Argentina) M González (Spain) M López	1	6	[8]
(Sweden) R Lindstedt (United States) R Ram	6	4	[9]
(United Kingdom) J Salisbury (United Kingdom) N Skupski	3	6	[11]
(New Zealand) M Daniell (Netherlands) W Koolhof	4	3
2	(Netherlands) J-J Rojer (Romania) H Tecău	6	6

Semifinals
(Pakistan) A-u-H Qureshi (New Zealand) A Sitak	4	6	[8]
WC	(United States) J Cerretani (India) L Paes	6	2	[10]
(United Kingdom) J Salisbury (United Kingdom) N Skupski	5	1
2	(Netherlands) J-J Rojer (Romania) H Tecău	7	6

Final
WC	(United States) J Cerretani (India) L Paes	4	2
2	(Netherlands) J-J Rojer (Romania) H Tecău	6	6

== Sources ==
- Main Draw
