= 2013 Winston-Salem Open – Doubles =

Doubles
- 2013 Winston-Salem Open

Final
- Champions: (Canada) Daniel Nestor (India) Leander Paes
- Runners-up: (Philippines) Treat Huey (United Kingdom) Dominic Inglot
- Score: 7-6^{(12-10)}, 7-5

Events
Singles	Doubles
← 2012 ·	Winston-Salem Open	· 2014 →

Santiago González and Scott Lipsky were the defending champions, but lost in the quarterfinals to Andre Begemann and Martin Emmrich.
Daniel Nestor and Leander Paes won the title, defeating Treat Huey and Dominic Inglot in the final, 7-6^{(12-10)}, 7–5.

== Seeds ==
1. (Canada) Daniel Nestor / (India) Leander Paes (champions)
2. (India) Rohan Bopanna / (France) Édouard Roger-Vasselin (withdrew)
3. (Spain) David Marrero / (Spain) Fernando Verdasco (quarterfinals)
4. (United Kingdom) Colin Fleming / (United Kingdom) Jonathan Marray (first round)

== Draw ==
=== Key ===
- Q = Qualifier
- WC = Wild card
- LL = Lucky loser
- Alt = Alternate
- SE = Special exempt
- PR = Protected ranking
- ITF = ITF entry
- JE = Junior exempt
- w/o = Walkover
- r = Retired
- d = Defaulted
- SR = Special ranking

=== Draw ===
First round
1	(Canada) D Nestor (India) L Paes	6	3	[10]
(Austria) J Knowle (Austria) J Melzer	1	6	[2]
(Australia) P Hanley (Australia) J Peers	7	6
(Romania) V Hănescu (Czech Republic) L Rosol	6^{5}	4
3	(Spain) D Marrero (Spain) F Verdasco	4	7	[10]
WC	(United States) J Cerretani (Netherlands) R Haase	6	5	[7]
(France) N Mahut (France) B Paire	3	6^{3}
WC	(United States) E Butorac (Denmark) F Nielsen	6	7^{7}
(Italy) A Seppi (Netherlands) I Sijsling	5	5
(Germany) A Begemann (Germany) M Emmrich	7	7
(Mexico) S González (United States) S Lipsky	6	7
4	(United Kingdom) C Fleming (United Kingdom) J Marray	4	5
(Slovakia) M Kližan (Slovakia) M Mertiňák	6	3	[8]
(Philippines) T Huey (United Kingdom) D Inglot	2	6	[10]
(Czech Republic) F Čermák (Slovakia) F Polášek	6	7
Alt	(Czech Republic) J Levinský (Chinese Taipei) Y-h Lu	1	5

Quarterfinals
1	(Canada) D Nestor (India) L Paes	6	6
(Australia) P Hanley (Australia) J Peers	4	4
3	(Spain) D Marrero (Spain) F Verdasco	6^{5}	3
WC	(United States) E Butorac (Denmark) F Nielsen	7^{7}	6
(Germany) A Begemann (Germany) M Emmrich	6	6
(Mexico) S González (United States) S Lipsky	4	4
(Philippines) T Huey (United Kingdom) D Inglot	6	7^{7}
(Czech Republic) F Čermák (Slovakia) F Polášek	1	6^{5}

Semifinals
1	(Canada) D Nestor (India) L Paes	6	6
WC	(United States) E Butorac (Denmark) F Nielsen	3	3
(Germany) A Begemann (Germany) M Emmrich	6	3	5
(Philippines) T Huey (United Kingdom) D Inglot	4	6	[10]

Final
1	(Canada) D Nestor (India) L Paes	7^{12}	7
(Philippines) T Huey (United Kingdom) D Inglot	6^{10}	5
