= 2019 Winston-Salem Open =

- Date: August 18–24
- Edition: 51st
- Category: ATP Tour 250 Series
- Draw: 48S / 16D
- Surface: Hard / outdoor
- Location: Winston-Salem, North Carolina, U.S.
- Venue: Wake Forest University

Champions

Singles
- (Poland) Hubert Hurkacz

Doubles
- (Poland) Łukasz Kubot / (Brazil) Marcelo Melo
| ← 2018 · | Winston-Salem Open | · 2021 → |

The 2019 Winston-Salem Open was a men's tennis tournament played on outdoor hard courts. It was the 51st edition of the Winston-Salem Open (as successor to previous tournaments in New Haven and Long Island), and part of the ATP Tour 250 Series of the 2019 ATP Tour. It took place at Wake Forest University in Winston-Salem, North Carolina, United States, from August 18 through August 24, 2019. It was the last event on the 2019 US Open Series before the 2019 US Open.

== Singles main-draw entrants ==
=== Seeds ===
| Country | Player | Rank^{1} | Seed |
|---|---|---|---|
| FRA | Benoît Paire | 29 | 1 |
| CAN | Denis Shapovalov | 34 | 2 |
| POL | Hubert Hurkacz | 40 | 3 |
| POR | João Sousa | 43 | 4 |
| GBR | Dan Evans | 44 | 5 |
| USA | Sam Querrey | 45 | 6 |
| ITA | Lorenzo Sonego | 47 | 7 |
| SRB | Filip Krajinović | 50 | 8 |
| ESP | Albert Ramos Viñolas | 51 | 9 |
| USA | Frances Tiafoe | 52 | 10 |
| ESP | Pablo Carreño Busta | 53 | 11 |
| NOR | Casper Ruud | 54 | 12 |
| SRB | Miomir Kecmanović | 58 | 13 |
| AUS | John Millman | 61 | 14 |
| FRA | Ugo Humbert | 62 | 15 |
| ESP | Feliciano López | 63 | 16 |

^{1} Rankings are as of August 12, 2019

=== Other entrants ===
The following players received wildcards into the singles main draw:

- (Czech Republic) Tomáš Berdych
- (United Kingdom) Andy Murray
- (Canada) Denis Shapovalov
- (United States) Frances Tiafoe

The following players received entry using a protected ranking into the singles main draw:

- (Germany) Cedrik-Marcel Stebe
- (Israel) Amir Weintraub

The following players received entry from the qualifying draw:

- (Bosnia and Herzegovina) Damir Džumhur
- (United States) Bjorn Fratangelo
- (United States) Marcos Giron
- (United States) Raymond Sarmiento

=== Withdrawals ===
- (Georgia (country)) Nikoloz Basilashvili → replaced by (Brazil) Thiago Monteiro
- (Croatia) Borna Ćorić → replaced by (Spain) Albert Ramos Viñolas
- (Uruguay) Pablo Cuevas → replaced by (United States) Tennys Sandgren
- (Argentina) Federico Delbonis → replaced by (Australia) Alexei Popyrin
- (Bolivia) Hugo Dellien → replaced by (India) Prajnesh Gunneswaran
- (United States) Bradley Klahn → replaced by (Spain) Jaume Munar
- (Slovakia) Jozef Kovalík → replaced by (Israel) Amir Weintraub
- (Kazakhstan) Mikhail Kukushkin → replaced by (South Korea) Lee Duck-hee
- (France) Adrian Mannarino → replaced by (United States) Denis Kudla
- (Japan) Yoshihito Nishioka → replaced by (France) Antoine Hoang

=== Retirements ===
- (Kazakhstan) Alexander Bublik ((Injury))
- (France) Jérémy Chardy (Ankle injury)
- (Serbia) Filip Krajinović ((Illness))
- (Spain) Feliciano López ((Unknown))
- (South Africa) Lloyd Harris ((Unknown))

== Doubles main-draw entrants ==
=== Seeds ===
| Country | Player | Country | Player | Rank^{1} | Seed |
|---|---|---|---|---|---|
| POL | Łukasz Kubot | BRA | Marcelo Melo | 9 | 1 |
| USA | Rajeev Ram | GBR | Joe Salisbury | 40 | 2 |
| CRO | Nikola Mektić | CRO | Franko Škugor | 43 | 3 |
| GER | Kevin Krawietz | GER | Andreas Mies | 43 | 4 |

^{1} Rankings are as of August 12, 2019

=== Other entrants ===
The following pairs received wildcards into the doubles main draw:

- (Israel) Jonathan Erlich / (India) Leander Paes
- (United States) Nicholas Monroe / (United States) Tennys Sandgren

The following pair received entry as alternates:

- (United Kingdom) Dan Evans / (United Kingdom) Jonny O'Mara

=== Withdrawals ===
- (Croatia) Ivan Dodig

== Champions ==
=== Singles ===
- (Poland) Hubert Hurkacz def. (France) Benoît Paire, 6–3, 3–6, 6–3

=== Doubles ===
- (Poland) Łukasz Kubot / (Brazil) Marcelo Melo def. (United States) Nicholas Monroe / (United States) Tennys Sandgren, 6–7^{(6–8)}, 6–1, [10–3]
