= 2019 Winston-Salem Open – Doubles =

Doubles
- 2019 Winston-Salem Open

Final
- Champions: (Poland) Łukasz Kubot (Brazil) Marcelo Melo
- Runners-up: (United States) Nicholas Monroe (United States) Tennys Sandgren
- Score: 6–7^{(6–8)}, 6–1, [10–3]

Events
Singles	Doubles
← 2018 ·	Winston-Salem Open	· 2021 →

Jean-Julien Rojer and Horia Tecău were the two-time defending champions, and chose not to participate this year.

Łukasz Kubot and Marcelo Melo won the title, defeating Nicholas Monroe and Tennys Sandgren, 6–7^{(6–8)}, 6–1, [10–3].

== Seeds ==
1. (Poland) Łukasz Kubot / (Brazil) Marcelo Melo (champions)
2. (United States) Rajeev Ram / (United Kingdom) Joe Salisbury (quarterfinals)
3. (Croatia) Nikola Mektić / (Croatia) Franko Škugor (first round)
4. (Germany) Kevin Krawietz / (Germany) Andreas Mies (first round)

== Draw ==
=== Key ===
- Q = Qualifier
- WC = Wild card
- LL = Lucky loser
- Alt = Alternate
- SE = Special exempt
- PR = Protected ranking
- ITF = ITF entry
- JE = Junior exempt
- w/o = Walkover
- r = Retired
- d = Defaulted
- SR = Special ranking

=== Draw ===
First round
1	(Poland) Ł Kubot (Brazil) M Melo	6	6
(Brazil) M Demoliner (United Kingdom) D Inglot	4	1
Alt	(United Kingdom) D Evans (United Kingdom) J O'Mara	6	5	[10]
(New Zealand) M Daniell (United Kingdom) K Skupski	4	7	[5]
3	(Croatia) N Mektić (Croatia) F Škugor	6^{2}	6	[6]
(United Kingdom) J Murray (United Kingdom) N Skupski	7^{7}	3	[10]
(Austria) O Marach (Austria) J Melzer	6	6
(France) J Chardy (France) F Martin	4	4
(Belgium) S Gillé (Belgium) J Vliegen	6	6
(Netherlands) R Haase (Netherlands) W Koolhof	3	4
(United Kingdom) L Bambridge (Japan) B McLachlan	6	7^{7}
4	(Germany) K Krawietz (Germany) A Mies	3	6^{5}
WC	(United States) N Monroe (United States) T Sandgren	6	6
(India) R Bopanna (India) D Sharan	3	3
WC	(Israel) J Erlich (India) L Paes	2	3
2	(United States) R Ram (United Kingdom) J Salisbury	6	6

Quarterfinals
1	(Poland) Ł Kubot (Brazil) M Melo	6	6
Alt	(United Kingdom) D Evans (United Kingdom) J O'Mara	2	2
(United Kingdom) J Murray (United Kingdom) N Skupski	4	7^{7}	[10]
(Austria) O Marach (Austria) J Melzer	6	6^{5}	[7]
(Belgium) S Gillé (Belgium) J Vliegen	2	7^{7}	[10]
(United Kingdom) L Bambridge (Japan) B McLachlan	6	6^{4}	[7]
WC	(United States) N Monroe (United States) T Sandgren	6	6
2	(United States) R Ram (United Kingdom) J Salisbury	3	3

Semifinals
1	(Poland) Ł Kubot (Brazil) M Melo	6	6
(United Kingdom) J Murray (United Kingdom) N Skupski	2	3
(Belgium) S Gillé (Belgium) J Vliegen	6^{1}	4
WC	(United States) N Monroe (United States) T Sandgren	7^{7}	6

Final
1	(Poland) Ł Kubot (Brazil) M Melo	6^{6}	6	[10]
WC	(United States) N Monroe (United States) T Sandgren	7^{8}	1	[3]
