= 2014 Winston-Salem Open =

- Date: August 17–23
- Edition: 46th
- Category: ATP World Tour 250 Series
- Draw: 32S/16D
- Surface: Hard / outdoor
- Location: Winston-Salem, North Carolina, USA
- Venue: Wake Forest University

Champions

Singles
- (Czech Republic) Lukáš Rosol

Doubles
- (Colombia) Juan Sebastián Cabal / (Colombia) Robert Farah
← 2013 ·	Winston-Salem Open	· 2015 →

The 2014 Winston-Salem Open was a men's tennis tournament played on outdoor hard courts. It was the 46th edition of the Winston-Salem Open (as successor to previous tournaments in New Haven and Long Island), and was part of the ATP World Tour 250 Series of the 2014 ATP World Tour. It took place at the Wake Forest University in Winston-Salem, North Carolina, United States, from August 17 through August 23, 2014. It was the last event on the 2014 US Open Series before the 2014 US Open.

== Singles main-draw entrants ==
=== Seeds ===
Country	Player	Rank*	Seed
USA	John Isner	14	1
RSA	Kevin Anderson	17	2
ESP	Tommy Robredo	20	3
ARG	Leonardo Mayer	26	4
ESP	Guillermo García López	32	5
POR	João Sousa	37	6
CZE	Lukáš Rosol	38	7
ESP	Marcel Granollers	39	8
TPE	Lu Yen-hsun	43	9
ESP	Pablo Andújar	47	10
USA	Donald Young	48	11
FRA	Édouard Roger-Vasselin	49	12
KAZ	Mikhail Kukushkin	51	13
ITA	Andreas Seppi	52	14
FIN	Jarkko Nieminen	53	15
USA	Steve Johnson	55	16

- Rankings are as of August 11, 2014

=== Other entrants ===
The following players received wildcards into the singles main draw:

- (South Africa) Kevin Anderson
- (United States) Robby Ginepri
- (United States) Ryan Harrison
- (United States) Noah Rubin

The following players received entry from the qualifying draw:

- (Bosnia and Herzegovina) Damir Džumhur
- (United States) Marcos Giron
- (Belgium) David Goffin
- (United States) Wayne Odesnik

=== Withdrawals ===
Before the tournament

- (Croatia) Ivan Dodig
- (Colombia) Alejandro Falla
- (Russia) Teymuraz Gabashvili
- (Colombia) Santiago Giraldo
- (Canada) Vasek Pospisil
- (United States) Jack Sock
- (Russia) Dmitry Tursunov
- (Czech Republic) Jiří Veselý

During the tournament

- (United States) John Isner (ankle injury)

=== Retirements ===
- (United States) Ryan Harrison

== Doubles main-draw entrants ==
=== Seeds ===
Country	Player	Country	Player	Rank^{1}	Seed
ESP	David Marrero	IND	Leander Paes	22	1
IND	Rohan Bopanna	CAN	Daniel Nestor	26	2
GBR	Jamie Murray	AUS	John Peers	59	3
~~PHI~~	~~Treat Huey~~	~~GBR~~	~~Dominic Inglot~~	~~65~~	~~4~~

- Rankings are as of August 11, 2014

=== Other entrants ===
The following pairs received wildcards into the doubles main draw:

- (Austria) Jürgen Melzer / (Czech Republic) Lukáš Rosol
- (United States) Nicholas Monroe / (United States) Donald Young

The following pair used a protected ranking to gain entry into the doubles main draw:

- (United Kingdom) Colin Fleming / (United Kingdom) Ross Hutchins

The following pair received entry as alternates:

- (Romania) Florin Mergea / (Portugal) João Sousa

=== Withdrawals ===
Before the tournament

- (United Kingdom) Dominic Inglot (abdominal injury)

=== Retirements ===
- (Spain) David Marrero (back injury)

== Champions ==
=== Singles ===
(Czech Republic) Lukáš Rosol def. (Poland) Jerzy Janowicz, 3–6, 7–6^{(7–3)}, 7–5

=== Doubles ===
(Colombia) Juan Sebastián Cabal / (Colombia) Robert Farah def. (United Kingdom) Jamie Murray / (Australia) John Peers, 6–3, 6–4
