= 2017 Winston-Salem Open – Singles =

Singles
- 2017 Winston-Salem Open

Final
- Champion: (Spain) Roberto Bautista Agut
- Runner-up: (Bosnia and Herzegovina) Damir Džumhur
- Score: 6–4, 6–4

Details
- Draw: 48 (4 Q / 3 WC )
- Seeds: 16

Events
Singles	Doubles
- Winston-Salem Open

Pablo Carreño Busta was the defending champion, but lost in the second round to Julien Benneteau.

Roberto Bautista Agut won the title, defeating Damir Džumhur in the final, 6–4, 6–4.

== Seeds ==
All seeds receive a bye into the second round.

1. (Spain) Roberto Bautista Agut (champion)
2. (Spain) Pablo Carreño Busta (second round)
3. (United States) John Isner (third round)
4. (South Africa) Kevin Anderson (withdrew)
5. (Uruguay) Pablo Cuevas (second round)
6. (United States) Steve Johnson (quarterfinals)
7. (Italy) Paolo Lorenzi (third round)
8. (Spain) Fernando Verdasco (second round)
9. (France) Gilles Simon (second round)
10. (Japan) Yūichi Sugita (second round)
11. (Serbia) Viktor Troicki (second round)
12. (United Kingdom) Aljaž Bedene (second round)
13. (South Korea) Chung Hyeon (quarterfinals)
14. (Croatia) Borna Ćorić (quarterfinals)
15. (Russia) Daniil Medvedev (second round)
16. (Czech Republic) Jiří Veselý (second round)
17. (Portugal) João Sousa (second round)

Click on the seed number of a player to go to their draw section.

== Draw ==
Key

- Q = Qualifier
- WC = Wild card
- LL = Lucky loser
- Alt = Alternate
- ITF = ITF entry
- PR = Protected ranking
- SR = Special ranking
- SE = Special exempt
- JE = Junior exempt
- JR = Junior Accelerator Programme entrant
- CO = College Accelerator Programme entrant
- NG = Next Gen Accelerator Program entrant
- w/o = Walkover
- r = Retired
- d = Defaulted

=== Finals ===
Quarterfinals
1	(Spain) Roberto Bautista Agut	6	7^{7}
WC	(United States) Taylor Fritz	2	6^{3}
14/WC	(Croatia) Borna Ćorić	4	6^{2}
(Germany) Jan-Lennard Struff	6	7^{7}
6	(United States) Steve Johnson	7	3	3
Q	(United Kingdom) Kyle Edmund	5	6	6
(Bosnia and Herzegovina) Damir Džumhur	6	6
13	(South Korea) Chung Hyeon	4	2

Semifinals
1	(Spain) Roberto Bautista Agut	6	6
(Germany) Jan-Lennard Struff	2	4
Q	(United Kingdom) Kyle Edmund	6	5	3
(Bosnia and Herzegovina) Damir Džumhur	1	7	6

Final
1	(Spain) Roberto Bautista Agut	6	6
(Bosnia and Herzegovina) Damir Džumhur	4	4

=== Top half ===
==== Section 1 ====
First round
(Serbia) D Lajović	6	6
WC	(Cyprus) P Chrysochos	2	3
(Cyprus) M Baghdatis	7	7
PR	(Lithuania) R Berankis	5	5
WC	(United States) T Fritz	4	6	6
(Tunisia) M Jaziri	6	4	3
(Brazil) T Monteiro	6	6
(Ukraine) A Dolgopolov	3	3

Second round
1	(Spain) R Bautista Agut	6	6
(Serbia) D Lajović	4	3
(Cyprus) M Baghdatis	6	7^{7}
16	(Czech Republic) J Veselý	2	6^{3}
10	(Japan) Y Sugita	3	2
WC	(United States) T Fritz	6	6
(Brazil) T Monteiro	6	4	4
7	(Italy) P Lorenzi	2	6	6

Third round
1	(Spain) R Bautista Agut	6	6
(Cyprus) M Baghdatis	3	4
WC	(United States) T Fritz	7^{7}	7^{7}
7	(Italy) P Lorenzi	6^{3}	6^{5}

Quarterfinals
1	(Spain) R Bautista Agut	6	7^{7}
WC	(United States) T Fritz	2	6^{3}

==== Section 2 ====
First round
(Argentina) N Kicker	5	2
(Russia) A Kuznetsov	7	6
Q	(Brazil) R Dutra Silva	4	2
(United States) D Young	6	6
(Serbia) J Tipsarević	2	2
(Italy) A Seppi	6	6
(Germany) J-L Struff	7^{7}	7^{7}
(Slovakia) N Gombos	6^{3}	6^{4}

Second round
3	(United States) J Isner	2	7^{7}	6
(Russia) A Kuznetsov	6	6^{5}	3
(United States) D Young	6	4	2
14/WC	(Croatia) B Ćorić	4	6	6
12	(United Kingdom) A Bedene	4	5
(Italy) A Seppi	6	7
(Germany) J-L Struff	7^{7}	7
5	(Uruguay) P Cuevas	6^{2}	5

Third round
3	(United States) J Isner	5	2
14/WC	(Croatia) B Ćorić	7	6
(Italy) A Seppi	3	7^{7}	6^{3}
(Germany) J-L Struff	6	6^{3}	7^{7}

Quarterfinals
14/WC	(Croatia) B Ćorić	4	6^{2}
(Germany) J-L Struff	6	7^{7}

=== Bottom half ===
==== Section 3 ====
First round
LL	(France) J Eysseric	2	1
(Chinese Taipei) Y-h Lu	6	6
(Argentina) C Berlocq	6	6
Q	(Australia) A Bolt	2	4
Q	(United Kingdom) K Edmund	6	6
(Italy) T Fabbiano	2	3
Q	(Hungary) M Fucsovics	7^{7}	6
WC	(Latvia) E Gulbis	6^{1}	2

Second round
6	(United States) S Johnson	6	6
(Chinese Taipei) Y-h Lu	4	3
(Argentina) C Berlocq	3	6	6
11	(Serbia) V Troicki	6	1	2
15	(Russia) D Medvedev	6	2	6^{6}
Q	(United Kingdom) K Edmund	2	6	7^{8}
Q	(Hungary) M Fucsovics	6	3	6
17	(Portugal) J Sousa	3	6	1

Third round
6	(United States) S Johnson	7^{7}	6
(Argentina) C Berlocq	6^{1}	4
Q	(United Kingdom) K Edmund	6	6
Q	(Hungary) M Fucsovics	2	1

Quarterfinals
6	(United States) S Johnson	7	3	3
Q	(United Kingdom) K Edmund	5	6	6

==== Section 4 ====
First round
LL	(Germany) D Köpfer	2	1
(Argentina) H Zeballos	6	6
(Uzbekistan) D Istomin	4	4
(Bosnia and Herzegovina) D Džumhur	6	6
(Russia) A Rublev	6	6
(Belgium) S Darcis	4	4
(France) J Benneteau	6	6
(France) P-H Herbert	3	2

Second round
8	(Spain) F Verdasco	6	5	4
(Argentina) H Zeballos	3	7	6
(Bosnia and Herzegovina) D Džumhur	6	1	6
9	(France) G Simon	4	6	4
13	(South Korea) H Chung	5	6	6
(Russia) A Rublev	7	1	1
(France) J Benneteau	7^{7}	6^{5}	6
2	(Spain) P Carreño Busta	6^{5}	7^{7}	3

Third round
(Argentina) H Zeballos	5	3
(Bosnia and Herzegovina) D Džumhur	7	6
13	(South Korea) H Chung	6	1
(France) J Benneteau	4	1^{r}

Quarterfinals
(Bosnia and Herzegovina) D Džumhur	6	6
13	(South Korea) H Chung	4	2

== Qualifying ==
=== Seeds ===
1. (United Kingdom) Kyle Edmund (qualified)
2. (Brazil) Rogério Dutra Silva (qualified)
3. (Belgium) Ruben Bemelmans (first round)
4. (Hungary) Márton Fucsovics (qualified)
5. (Australia) Alex de Minaur (first round)
6. (Germany) Dominik Köpfer (qualifying competition, lucky loser)
7. (France) Jonathan Eysseric (qualifying competition, lucky loser)
8. (Australia) Alex Bolt (qualified)

=== Qualifiers ===
1. (United Kingdom) Kyle Edmund
2. (Brazil) Rogério Dutra Silva
3. (Australia) Alex Bolt
4. (Hungary) Márton Fucsovics

=== Lucky losers ===
1. (Germany) Dominik Köpfer
2. (France) Jonathan Eysseric

=== Qualifying draw ===
==== First qualifier ====
First round
1/Alt	(United Kingdom) Kyle Edmund	7^{7}	6
(Australia) Max Purcell	6^{2}	4
(Argentina) Facundo Mena	3	4
7	(France) Jonathan Eysseric	6	6

Qualifying competition
1/Alt	(United Kingdom) Kyle Edmund	6	6
7	(France) Jonathan Eysseric	3	1

==== Second qualifier ====
First round
2	(Brazil) Rogério Dutra Silva	4	7^{7}	7
(Ecuador) Gonzalo Escobar	6	6^{4}	5
(Croatia) Franko Škugor	6	6^{4}	3
6	(Germany) Dominik Köpfer	2	7^{7}	6

Qualifying competition
2	(Brazil) Rogério Dutra Silva	6	6
6	(Germany) Dominik Köpfer	4	4

==== Third qualifier ====
First round
3	(Belgium) Ruben Bemelmans	6^{3}	6	6^{6}
WC	(Croatia) Borna Gojo	7^{7}	3	7^{8}
WC	(Tunisia) Skander Mansouri	6^{12}	2
8	(Australia) Alex Bolt	7^{14}	6

Qualifying competition
WC	(Croatia) Borna Gojo	0	6	1
8	(Australia) Alex Bolt	6	3	6

==== Fourth qualifier ====
First round
4	(Hungary) Márton Fucsovics	6	6
(South Africa) Nicolaas Scholtz	1	2
PR	(United States) Kevin King	6	6
5	(Australia) Alex de Minaur	1	2

Qualifying competition
4	(Hungary) Márton Fucsovics	6	6
PR	(United States) Kevin King	2	4
