= 2016 Winston-Salem Open =

- Date: August 21–27
- Edition: 48th
- Category: ATP World Tour 250 Series
- Draw: 48S/16D
- Surface: Hard / outdoor
- Location: Winston-Salem, North Carolina, USA
- Venue: Wake Forest University

Champions

Singles
- (Spain) Pablo Carreño Busta

Doubles
- (Spain) Guillermo García López / (Finland) Henri Kontinen
- Winston-Salem Open

The 2016 Winston-Salem Open was a men's tennis tournament played on outdoor hard courts. It was the 48th edition of the Winston-Salem Open (as successor to previous tournaments in New Haven and Long Island), and part of the ATP World Tour 250 Series of the 2016 ATP World Tour. It took place at Wake Forest University in Winston-Salem, North Carolina, United States, from August 23 through August 29, 2015. It was the last event on the 2016 US Open Series before the 2016 US Open.

== Singles main-draw entrants ==
=== Seeds ===
Country	Player	Rank*	Seed
FRA	Richard Gasquet	15	1
ESP	Roberto Bautista Agut	17	2
URU	Pablo Cuevas	19	3
USA	Steve Johnson	23	4
RSA	Kevin Anderson	24	5
USA	Sam Querrey	29	6
FRA	Gilles Simon	31	7
ESP	Albert Ramos Viñolas	33	8
SRB	Viktor Troicki	35	9
POR	João Sousa	36	10
ITA	Paolo Lorenzi	40	11
RUS	Andrey Kuznetsov	41	12
ARG	Federico Delbonis	43	13
CYP	Marcos Baghdatis	44	14
ESP	Fernando Verdasco	45	15
ESP	Pablo Carreño Busta	48	16

- Rankings are as of August 15, 2016

=== Other entrants ===
The following players received wildcards into the singles main draw:

- (Spain) Roberto Bautista Agut
- (United States) Bjorn Fratangelo
- (United States) Rajeev Ram
- (United States) Frances Tiafoe

The following player received entry using a protected ranking:

- ~~(Australia) Thanasi Kokkinakis~~

The following players received entry from the qualifying draw:

- (Moldova) Radu Albot
- (Australia) James Duckworth
- (Republic of Ireland) James McGee
- (Japan) Yoshihito Nishioka

The following player received entry as a lucky loser:

- (Netherlands) Tim van Rijthoven

=== Withdrawals ===
Before the tournament

- (Croatia) Borna Ćorić →replaced by (United Kingdom) Daniel Evans
- (Spain) Marcel Granollers →replaced by (Dominican Republic) Víctor Estrella Burgos
- (Latvia) Ernests Gulbis →replaced by (France) Pierre-Hugues Herbert
- (France) Nicolas Mahut →replaced by (Czech Republic) Lukáš Rosol
- (Argentina) Juan Mónaco →replaced by (Russia) Evgeny Donskoy
- (France) Benoît Paire →replaced by (Bosnia and Herzegovina) Damir Džumhur
- (Argentina) Guido Pella →replaced by (France) Stéphane Robert
- (Israel) Dudi Sela →replaced by (Germany) Jan-Lennard Struff
- (Argentina) Horacio Zeballos →replaced by (Netherlands) Tim van Rijthoven

During the tournament

- (Russia) Mikhail Youzhny

=== Retirements ===
- (Czech Republic) Jiří Veselý

== Doubles main-draw entrants ==
=== Seeds ===
Country	Player	Country	Player	Rank^{1}	Seed
POL	Łukasz Kubot	SRB	Nenad Zimonjić	58	1
CRO	Mate Pavić	NZL	Michael Venus	78	2
SWE	Robert Lindstedt	PAK	Aisam-ul-Haq Qureshi	79	3
USA	Eric Butorac	USA	Scott Lipsky	86	4

- Rankings are as of August 15, 2016

=== Other entrants ===
The following pairs received wildcards into the doubles main draw:

- (Germany) Andre Begemann / (India) Leander Paes
- (Tunisia) Skander Mansouri / (Germany) Christian Seraphim

== Champions ==
=== Singles ===
- (Spain) Pablo Carreño Busta def. (Spain) Roberto Bautista Agut, 6–7^{(6–8)}, 7–6^{(7–1)}, 6–4

=== Doubles ===
- (Spain) Guillermo García López / (Finland) Henri Kontinen def. (Germany) Andre Begemann / (India) Leander Paes, 4–6, 7–6^{(8–6)}, [10–8]
