= Romain Bogaerts =

Belgian tennis player (born 1993)

- Country (sports): Belgium
- Residence: Huppaye, Belgium
- Born: 23 December 1993 (age 32) Namur, Belgium
- Height: 1.88 m (6 ft 2 in)
- Plays: Left-handed (two-handed backhand)
- College: Wake Forest University
- Prize money: $7,559

Singles
- Career record: 0–1 (at ATP Tour level, Grand Slam level, and in Davis Cup)
- Career titles: 0 ITF
- Highest ranking: No. 1092 (12 August 2013)

Doubles
- Career record: 0–0 (at ATP Tour level, Grand Slam level, and in Davis Cup)
- Career titles: 2 ITF
- Highest ranking: No. 879 (10 November 2014)
- Last updated on: 20 February 2017.

Romain Bogaerts (born 23 December 1993) is a Belgian tennis player.

Bogaerts has a career high ATP singles ranking of 1092 achieved on 12 August 2013. He also has a career high ATP doubles ranking of 879 achieved on 10 November 2014.

Bogaerts made his ATP main draw debut at the 2013 Winston-Salem Open in the singles draw facing Lu Yen-hsun. Bogaerts also played college tennis at Wake Forest University.
