= Christian Seraphim =

German tennis player

- Country (sports): Germany
- Residence: Munich, Germany
- Born: 25 May 1995 (age 29)
- Height: 2.08 m (6 ft 10 in)
- Prize money: $7,014

Singles
- Career record: 0–0 (at ATP Tour level, Grand Slam level, and in Davis Cup)
- Career titles: 0

Doubles
- Career record: 0–3
- Career titles: 0
- Highest ranking: 949 (2 July 2018)
- Current ranking: 949 (2 July 2018)
- Last updated on: 10 July 2018.

Christian Seraphim (born 25 May 1995) is a German tennis player. Seraphim played college tennis at Wake Forest University.

Seraphim made his ATP main draw debut at the 2015 Winston-Salem Open in the doubles draw partnering Skander Mansouri.
