= Victoria Azarenka career statistics =

Career finals
Discipline	Type	Won	Lost	Total
Singles	Grand Slam	2	3	5
Singles	Summer Olympics	–	–	–
Singles	WTA Finals (Note: Formerly known as WTA Tour Championships until 2014.)	–	1	1
Singles	WTA 1000 (Note: THe WTA Tier I tournaments were reclassified as WTA Premier Mandatory & 5 in 2009 and later as WTA 1000 tournaments in 2021.)	10	5	15
Singles	WTA 500 & 250 (Note: In 2009, the WTA Tier II tournaments were reclassified as WTA Premier tournaments, while the WTA Tier III tournaments, WTA Tier IV tournaments and WTA Tier V tournaments were reclassified as WTA International tournaments. In 2021, the WTA Premier tournaments were reclassified as WTA 500 tournaments and WTA International tournaments as WTA 250 tournaments.)	9	11	20
Singles	Total	21	20	41
Doubles	Grand Slam	–	4	4
Doubles	Summer Olympics	–	–	–
Doubles	WTA Finals (Note: Formerly known as WTA Tour Championships until 2014.)	–	–	–
Doubles	WTA 1000	5	3	8
Doubles	WTA 500 & 250	5	4	9
Doubles	Total	10	11	21
Mixed doubles	Grand Slam	2	2	4
Mixed doubles	Summer Olympics	1	–	1
Mixed doubles	Total	3	2	5
Total		34	33	67

This is a list of the main career statistics of Belarusian professional tennis player Victoria Azarenka. To date, she has won 34 WTA Tour level tournaments (21 in singles, ten in doubles and three in mixed doubles). She has won two Grand Slam singles titles (back-to-back Australian Open in 2012 and 2013). Azarenka has also won two majors in mixed doubles (the 2007 US Open and 2008 French Open) and has reached four finals in women's doubles. Qualified a couple of times at the year-end WTA Finals, she reached one final in 2011 when she lost to Petra Kvitová.

She is also successful at the WTA 1000 tournaments, winning 10 in singles (six as Mandatory and four as non-Mandatory). In doubles, she won four (two Mandatory and two non-Mandatory). In 2016, in singles she achieved Sunshine Double after winning Indian Wells and Miami Open in the same year. Among other achievements, she was also successful at the national tournaments, playing for Belarus. At the 2012 Summer Olympics in London, she is the bronze medalist in women's singles and gold medalist in mixed doubles with Max Mirnyi.

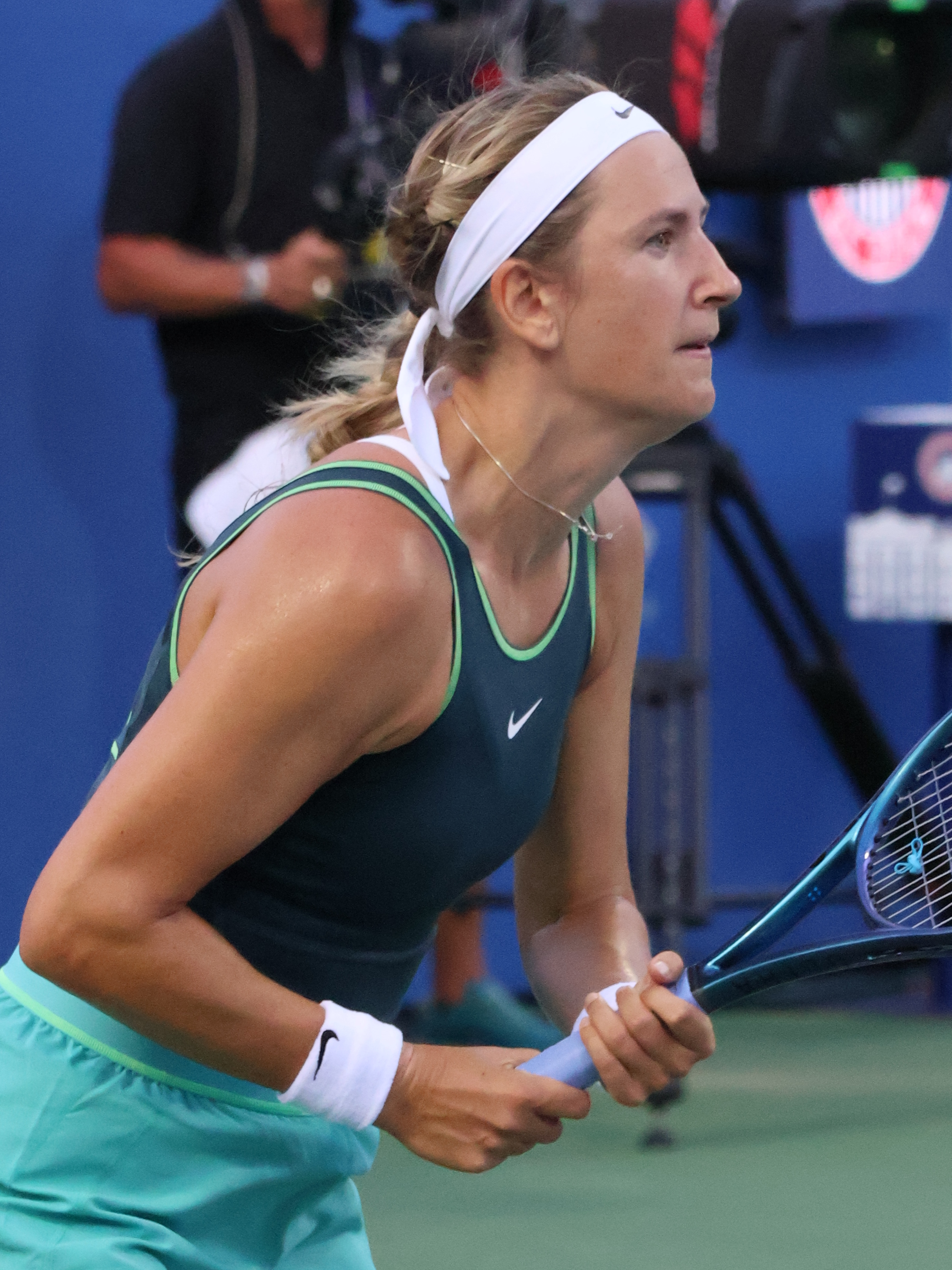
Azarenka at the 2023 Washington Open

== Performance timelines ==
Key
W	F	SF	QF	#R	RR	Q#	P#	DNQ	A	Z#	PO	G	S	B	NMS	NTI	P	NH

(W) winner; (F) finalist; (SF) semifinalist; (QF) quarterfinalist; (#R) rounds 4, 3, 2, 1; (RR) round-robin stage; (Q#) qualification round; (P#) preliminary round; (DNQ) did not qualify; (A) absent; (Z#) Davis/Fed Cup Zonal Group (with number indication) or (PO) play-off; (G) gold, (S) silver or (B) bronze Olympic/Paralympic medal; (NMS) not a Masters tournament; (NTI) not a Tier I tournament; (P) postponed; (NH) not held; (SR) strike rate (events won / competed); (W–L) win–loss record.
To avoid confusion and double counting, these charts are updated at the conclusion of a tournament or when the player's participation has ended.

Only main-draw results in WTA Tour, Grand Slam tournaments, Fed Cup/Billie Jean King Cup and Olympic Games are included in win–loss records.

=== Singles ===
Current after the 2025 Italian Open.

Tournament	2005	2006	2007	2008	2009	2010	2011	2012	2013	2014	2015	2016	2017	2018	2019	2020	2021	2022	2023	2024	2025	2026	SR	W–L	Win %
Grand Slam tournaments
Australian Open	A	1R	3R	3R	4R	QF	4R	W	W	QF	4R	QF	A	A	1R	A	1R	4R	SF	4R	1R	A	2 / 17	50–15	77%
French Open	A	1R	1R	4R	QF	1R	QF	4R	SF	A	3R	1R	A	1R	2R	2R	4R	3R	1R	2R	2R		0 / 18	30–18	63%
Wimbledon	A	1R	3R	3R	QF	3R	SF	SF	2R (Note: Withdrawals during tournaments are not considered as a loss.)	2R	QF	A	4R	2R	3R	NH	2R	A (Note: Suspended due to the ban of Russian and Belarusian athletes in light of the Russian invasion of Ukraine.)	4R	A	1R		0 / 15	36–15	71%
US Open	A	3R	4R	3R	3R	2R	3R	F	F	QF	QF	A	A	3R	1R	F	3R	4R	2R	3R	3R		0 / 17	48–17	74%
Win–loss	0–0	2–4	7–4	9–4	13–4	7–4	14–4	21–3	19–2	9–3	13–4	4–2	3–1	3–3	3–4	7–2	6–4	8–3	9–4	6–3	0–1		2 / 66	163–63	72%
Year-end championships
WTA Finals	DNQ				RR	RR	F	SF	RR	DNQ						NH	DNQ						0 / 5	8–10	44%
WTA Elite Trophy (Note: WTA Tournament of Champions was held from 2009 to 2014, when WTA Elite Trophy replaced it.)	NH			A	A	A	A	A	DNQ	A	A	DNQ			NH			DNQ	NH				0 / 0	0–0	–
National representation
Summer Olympics	NH			3R	NH			SF-B	NH			A	NH				A	NH		A	NH		0 / 2	7–2	78%
WTA 1000 + former Tier I
Qatar Open (Note: The first Premier 5 event of the year has switched back and forth between the Dubai Tennis Championships and the Qatar Total Open since 2009. Dubai was classified as a Premier 5 event from 2009 to 2011 before being succeeded by Doha for the 2012–2014 period. In 2015, Dubai regained its Premier 5 status while Doha was demoted to Premier status. The Premier 5 tournaments were reclassified as WTA 1000 tournaments in 2021.)	NMS			A	NH		NMS	W	W	A	NMS	A	NMS	A	NMS	A	NMS	2R	NMS	QF	1R	A	2 / 5	14–2	88%
Dubai	NMS				A	F	3R	NMS			A	NMS	A	NMS	A	NMS	A	NMS	3R	2R	2R	A	0 / 5	9–5	64%
Indian Wells Open	A	LQ	3R	A	SF	3R	QF	W	QF	2R	3R	W	A	2R	2R	NH	F	3R	2R	2R	2R	A	2 / 16	35–13	73%
Miami Open	A	3R	3R	3R	W	4R	W	QF	A	A	3R	W	A	SF	2R	NH	4R	3R	3R	SF	2R	A	3 / 16	44–13	77%
Madrid Open	NH				3R	1R	F	F	2R	A	3R	3R	A	2R	2R	NH	2R	3R	2R	3R	1R		0 / 14	22–12	65%
Italian Open	A	1R	A	3R	SF	2R	QF	3R	F	A	QF	2R	A	1R	QF	QF	A	3R	3R	QF	2R		0 / 16	29–14	67%
Canadian Open	A	A	A	SF	2R	SF	SF	2R	A	QF	3R	A	A	2R	2R	NH	QF	A	2R	3R	A		0 / 12	23–11	68%
Cincinnati Open	NMS				3R	1R	A	A	W	A	3R	A	A	2R	2R	W	3R	2R	2R	A	A		2 / 10	20–8	71%
Pan Pacific / Wuhan Open (Note: In 2014, the Toray Pan Pacific Open was downgraded to a Premier event and replaced by the Wuhan Open. The Premier 5 tournaments were reclassified as WTA 1000 tournaments in 2021.)	A	A	A	A	QF	SF	SF	QF	2R	A	2R	A	A	A	A	NH				A	A		0 / 6	11–5	71%
China Open	NMS				2R	2R	3R	W	1R	A	A	A	A	A	A	NH			1R	A	A		1 / 6	8–4	67%
Charleston Open (former)	A	A	A	3R	NMS																		0 / 1	2–1	67%
German Open (former)	A	A	A	SF	NMS/NH																		0 / 1	4–1	80%
Kremlin Cup (former)	A	A	QF	1R	NMS/NH																		0 / 2	2–2	50%
Southern California Open (former)	A	A	2R	A	NMS/NH																		0 / 1	1–1	50%
Guadalajara Open (former)	NH																	SF	QF	NMS			0 / 2	7–2	78%
Win–loss	0–0	2–2	7–4	13–6	20–7	15–9	24–6	28–3	18–4	2–2	13–7	14–1	0–0	9–6	8–6	8–1	11–4	12–6	9–7	14–7	4–6		10 / 103	231–94	71%
Career statistics
	2005	2006	2007	2008	2009	2010	2011	2012	2013	2014	2015	2016	2017	2018	2019	2020	2021	2022	2023	2024	2025	2026	SR	W–L	Win %
Tournaments	2	12	16	20	17	21	20	17	14	9	14	8	2	12	17	5	14	13	21	15	8		Career total: 277		
Titles	0	0	0	0	3	2	3	6	3	0	0	3	0	0	0	1	0	0	0	0	0		Career total: 21		
Finals	0	0	2	2	3	4	5	9	6	1	1	3	0	0	1	2	1	0	0	0	0		Career total: 39		
Hardcourt win–loss	3–2	9–6	21–10	22–12	32–10	32–12	32–11	47–5	32–6	14–7	19–9	22–1	0–0	14–7	13–12	11–3	18–6	16–9	17–13	20–10	4–6		20 / 181	398–157	72%
Clay win–loss	0–0	0–4	7–4	16–6	9–4	4–6	16–4	12–3	10–3	0–0	7–3	4–2	0–0	1–3	7–4	3–1	4–1	6–3	2–3	7–4	1–2		1 / 65	116–60	66%
Grass win–loss	0–0	0–1	2–2	2–2	4–1	6–2	7–2	10–2	1–0	1–2	5–1	0–0	4–2	2–2	2–2	0–0	6–2	0–0	4–3	3–1	0–0		0 / 30	59–27	69%
Carpet win–loss	0–0	0–1	0–0	0–0	0–0	0–0	0–0	0–0	0–0	0–0	0–0	0–0	0–0	0–0		Discontinued							0 / 1	0–1	0%
Overall win–loss	3–2	9–12	30–16	40–20	45–15	42–20	55–17	69–10	43–9	15–9	31–13	26–3	4–2	17–12	22–18	14–4	28–9	22–12	23–19	30–15	5–8		21 / 277	573–245	70%
Win (%)	60%	43%	65%	67%	75%	68%	76%	87%	83%	63%	70%	90%	67%	59%	55%	78%	76%	65%	55%	67%	38%	–	Career total: 70%		
Year-end ranking (Note: 2004: WTA ranking–506.)	146	92	30	15	7	10	3	1	2	32	22	13	208	51	50	13	27	26	22	20			$36,458,760		

=== Doubles ===
Current through the 2022 Cincinnati Open.

Tournament	2005	2006	2007	2008	2009	2010	2011	2012	...	2015	...	2018	2019	2020	2021	2022	2023	2024	2025	SR	W–L	Win %
Grand Slam tournaments
Australian Open	A	A	A	F	3R	3R	F	A		A		A	2R	A	A	A	A	A	A	0 / 5	15–3	83%
French Open	A	A	1R	QF	F	2R	QF	A		A		A	3R	A	A	A	2R	A		0 / 7	15–7	68%
Wimbledon	A	A	2R	QF	3R	1R	A	A		A		A	3R	NH	A	A	2R	A		0 / 5	8–3	73%
US Open	A	A	1R	1R	2R	A	A	A		A		2R	F	2R	A	A	QF	A		0 / 7	10–7	59%
Win–loss	0–0	0–0	1–3	11–4	9–2	3–3	8–2	0–0		0–0		1–1	10–2	1–1	0–0	0–0	4–2	0–0	0–0	0 / 24	48–20	71%
WTA 1000
Dubai / Qatar Open	NMS			A	A	2R	SF	A		A		A	A	A	A	A	A	A	A	0 / 2	3–2	60%
Indian Wells Open	A	A	1R	A	W	A	SF	2R		A		2R	1R	NH	A	A	A	A	A	1 / 6	10–3	77%
Miami Open	A	A	A	SF	A	A	A	A		A		1R	SF	NH	A	A	A	A	A	0 / 3	6–3	67%
Madrid Open	NH				QF	A	W	A		A		A	2R	NH	A	A	W	A	SF	2 / 4	16–3	84%
Italian Open	A	1R	A	A	2R	1R	A	A		A		A	W	A	A	A	2R	A	A	1 / 5	7–3	70%
Canadian Open	A	A	A	A	1R	A	F	A		A		A	SF	NH	A	A	A	A		0 / 3	6–2	75%
Cincinnati Open	NMS				A	W	A	A		A		A	A	2R	2R	QF	1R	A		1 / 5	9–4	69%
Pan Pacific / Wuhan Open	A	A	A	A	1R	QF	SF	A		A		A	A	NH				A		0 / 3	3–2	60%
China Open	NMS				1R	2R	2R	A		A		A	A	NH			A	A		0 / 3	2–2	50%
Guadalajara Open	NH															A	A	NMS		0 / 0	0–0	–
Career statistics
Tournaments	1	4	11	13	12	10	10	1		1		4	11	3	3	2	6	1	1	Career total: 94		
Titles	0	1	0	0	2	1	2	0		0		0	2	0	1	0	1	0	0	Career total: 10		
Finals	0	2	4	2	3	1	4	0		0		0	3	0	1	0	1	0	0	Career total: 21		
Overall win–loss	1–0	7–3	15–11	27–12	23–6	15–7	29–6	1–0		1–0		2–4	27–8	2–3	5–2	4–1	10–3	1–0	3–1	9 / 94	173–67	72%
Win (%)	100%	70%	58%	69%	79%	68%	83%	100%		100%		33%	77%	40%	71%	80%	77%	100%	75%	Career total: 72%		
Year-end ranking	429	110	32	12	15	44	12	367		433		272	18	21	159	209	45	547				

=== Mixed doubles ===
Tournament	2006	2007	2008	...	2012	...	2017	2018	...	2022	SR	W–L	Win%
Australian Open	A	F	1R		A		A	A		A	0 / 2	4–2	67%
French Open	A	1R	W		A		A	A		A	1 / 2	5–1	83%
Wimbledon	A	1R	A		3R		1R	F		A	0 / 4	7–4	64%
US Open	2R	W	A		A		A	A		1R	1 / 3	6–2	75%
Win–loss	1–1	9–3	5–1		2–1		0–1	5–1		0–1	2 / 11	22–9	71%

== Grand Slam finals ==
=== Singles: 5 (2 titles, 3 runner-ups) ===
Result	Year	Championship	Surface	Opponent	Score
Win	2012	Australian Open	Hard	(Russia) Maria Sharapova	6–3, 6–0
Loss	2012	US Open	Hard	(United States) Serena Williams	2–6, 6–2, 5–7
Win	2013	Australian Open (2)	Hard	(China) Li Na	4–6, 6–4, 6–3
Loss	2013	US Open	Hard	(United States) Serena Williams	5–7, 7–6^{(8–6)}, 1–6
Loss	2020	US Open	Hard	(Japan) Naomi Osaka	6–1, 3–6, 3–6

=== Doubles: 4 (4 runner-ups) ===
Result	Year	Championship	Surface	Partner	Opponents	Score
Loss	2008	Australian Open	Hard	(Israel) Shahar Pe'er	(Ukraine) Alona Bondarenko (Ukraine) Kateryna Bondarenko	6–2, 1–6, 4–6
Loss	2009	French Open	Clay	(Russia) Elena Vesnina	(Spain) Anabel Medina Garrigues (Spain) Virginia Ruano Pascual	1–6, 1–6
Loss	2011	Australian Open	Hard	(Russia) Maria Kirilenko	(Argentina) Gisela Dulko (Italy) Flavia Pennetta	6–2, 5–7, 1–6
Loss	2019	US Open	Hard	(Australia) Ashleigh Barty	(Belgium) Elise Mertens (Belarus) Aryna Sabalenka	5–7, 5–7

=== Mixed doubles: 4 (2 titles, 2 runner-ups) ===
Result	Year	Championship	Surface	Partner	Opponents	Score
Loss	2007	Australian Open	Hard	(Belarus) Max Mirnyi	(Russia) Elena Likhovtseva (Canada) Daniel Nestor	4–6, 4–6
Win	2007	US Open	Hard	(Belarus) Max Mirnyi	(United States) Meghann Shaughnessy (India) Leander Paes	6–4, 7–6^{(8–6)}
Win	2008	French Open	Clay	(United States) Bob Bryan	(Slovenia) Katarina Srebotnik (Serbia) Nenad Zimonjić	6–2, 7–6^{(7–4)}
Loss	2018	Wimbledon	Grass	(United Kingdom) Jamie Murray	(United States) Nicole Melichar (Austria) Alexander Peya	6–7^{(1–7)}, 3–6

== Other significant finals ==
=== Olympics ===
==== Singles: 1 (bronze medal) ====
Result	Year	Tournament	Surface	Opponent	Score
Bronze	2012	London Olympics	Grass	(Russia) Maria Kirilenko	6–3, 6–4

==== Mixed doubles: 1 (gold medal) ====
Result	Year	Tournament	Surface	Partner	Opponents	Score
Gold	2012	London Olympics	Grass	(Belarus) Max Mirnyi	(United Kingdom) Laura Robson (United Kingdom) Andy Murray	2–6, 6–3, [10–8]

=== Year-end championships ===
==== Singles: 1 (1 runner-up) ====
Result	Year	Championship	Surface	Opponent	Score
Loss	2011	WTA Finals, İstanbul	Hard (i)	(Czech Republic) Petra Kvitová	5–7, 6–4, 3–6

=== WTA 1000 finals ===
==== Singles: 15 (10 titles, 5 runner-ups) ====
Result	Year	Tournament	Surface	Opponent	Score
Win	2009	Miami Open	Hard	(United States) Serena Williams	6–3, 6–1
Loss	2010	Dubai Championships	Hard	(United States) Venus Williams	3–6, 5–7
Win	2011	Miami Open (2)	Hard	(Russia) Maria Sharapova	6–1, 6–4
Loss	2011	Madrid Open	Clay	(Czech Republic) Petra Kvitová	6–7^{(3–7)}, 4–6
Win	2012	Qatar Open	Hard	(Australia) Samantha Stosur	6–1, 6–2
Win	2012	Indian Wells Open	Hard	(Russia) Maria Sharapova	6–2, 6–3
Loss	2012	Madrid Open	Clay	(United States) Serena Williams	1–6, 3–6
Win	2012	China Open	Hard	(Russia) Maria Sharapova	6–3, 6–1
Win	2013	Qatar Open (2)	Hard	(United States) Serena Williams	7–6^{(8–6)}, 2–6, 6–3
Loss	2013	Italian Open	Clay	(United States) Serena Williams	1–6, 3–6
Win	2013	Cincinnati Open	Hard	(United States) Serena Williams	2–6, 6–2, 7–6^{(8–6)}
Win	2016	Indian Wells Open (2)	Hard	(United States) Serena Williams	6–4, 6–4
Win	2016	Miami Open (3)	Hard	(Russia) Svetlana Kuznetsova	6–3, 6–2
Win	2020	Cincinnati Open (2)	Hard	(Japan) Naomi Osaka	w/o
Loss	2021	Indian Wells Open	Hard	(Spain) Paula Badosa	6–7^{(5–7)}, 6–2, 6–7^{(2–7)}

==== Doubles: 8 (5 titles, 3 runner-ups) ====
Result	Year	Tournament	Surface	Partner	Opponents	Score
Loss	2007	Southern California Open	Hard	(Russia) Anna Chakvetadze	(Zimbabwe) Cara Black (United States) Liezel Huber	5–7, 4–6
Loss	2007	Kremlin Cup	Carpet (i)	(Belarus) Tatiana Poutchek	(Zimbabwe) Cara Black (United States) Liezel Huber	6–4, 1–6, [7–10]
Win	2009	Indian Wells Open	Hard	(Russia) Vera Zvonareva	(Argentina) Gisela Dulko (Israel) Shahar Pe'er	6–4, 3–6, [10–5]
Win	2010	Cincinnati Open	Hard	(Russia) Maria Kirilenko	(United States) Lisa Raymond (Australia) Rennae Stubbs	7–6^{(7–4)}, 7–6^{(10–8)}
Win	2011	Mutua Madrid Open	Clay	(Russia) Maria Kirilenko	(Czech Republic) Květa Peschke (Slovenia) Katarina Srebotnik	6–4, 6–3
Loss	2011	Canadian Open	Hard	(Russia) Maria Kirilenko	(United States) Liezel Huber (United States) Lisa Raymond	w/o
Win	2019	Italian Open	Clay	(Australia) Ashleigh Barty	(Germany) Anna-Lena Grönefeld (Netherlands) Demi Schuurs	4–6, 6–0, [10–3]
Win	2023	Mutua Madrid Open (2)	Clay	(Brazil) Beatriz Haddad Maia	(United States) Coco Gauff (United States) Jessica Pegula	6–1, 6–4

== WTA career finals ==
=== Singles: 41 (21 titles, 20 runner-ups) ===
Legend Grand Slam (2–3) WTA Finals (0–1) WTA 1000 (10–5) WTA 500 (4–6) WTA 250 (5–5)	Finals by Surface Hard (20–13) Grass (0–1) Clay (1–6) Carpet (0–0)

Result	W–L	Date	Tournament	Tier	Surface	Opponent	Score
Loss	0–1	May 2007	Estoril Open, Portugal	Tier IV	Clay	(Germany) Gréta Arn	6–2, 1–6, 6–7^{(3–7)}
Loss	0–2	Oct 2007	Tashkent Open, Uzbekistan	Tier IV	Hard	(France) Pauline Parmentier	5–7, 2–6
Loss	0–3	Jan 2008	Gold Coast Championships, Australia	Tier III	Hard	(China) Li Na	6–4, 3–6, 4–6
Loss	0–4	May 2008	Prague Open, Czech Republic	Tier IV	Clay	(Russia) Vera Zvonareva	6–7^{(2–7)}, 2–6
Win	1–4	Jan 2009	Brisbane International, Australia	International	Hard	(France) Marion Bartoli	6–3, 6–1
Win	2–4	Feb 2009	Memphis Indoors, U.S.	International	Hard (i)	(Denmark) Caroline Wozniacki	6–1, 6–3
Win	3–4	Apr 2009	Miami Open, U.S.	Premier M	Hard	(United States) Serena Williams	6–3, 6–1
Loss	3–5	Feb 2010	Dubai Tennis Championships, UAE	Premier 5	Hard	(United States) Venus Williams	3–6, 5–7
Loss	3–6	Jun 2010	Eastbourne International, U.K.	Premier	Grass	(Russia) Ekaterina Makarova	6–7^{(5–7)}, 4–6
Win	4–6	Aug 2010	Stanford Classic, U.S.	Premier	Hard	(Russia) Maria Sharapova	6–4, 6–1
Win	5–6	Oct 2010	Kremlin Cup, Russia	Premier	Hard (i)	(Russia) Maria Kirilenko	6–3, 6–4
Win	6–6	Apr 2011	Miami Open, U.S. (2)	Premier M	Hard	(Russia) Maria Sharapova	6–1, 6–4
Win	7–6	Apr 2011	Andalucia Tennis Experience, Spain	International	Clay	(Romania) Irina-Camelia Begu	6–3, 6–2
Loss	7–7	May 2011	Madrid Open, Spain	Premier M	Clay	(Czech Republic) Petra Kvitová	6–7^{(3–7)}, 4–6
Win	8–7	Oct 2011	Luxembourg Open, Luxembourg	International	Hard (i)	(Romania) Monica Niculescu	6–2, 6–2
Loss	8–8	Oct 2011	WTA Tour Championships, Turkey	Finals	Hard (i)	(Czech Republic) Petra Kvitová	5–7, 6–4, 3–6
Win	9–8	Jan 2012	Sydney International, Australia	Premier	Hard	(China) Li Na	6–2, 1–6, 6–3
Win	10–8	Jan 2012	Australian Open, Australia	Grand Slam	Hard	(Russia) Maria Sharapova	6–3, 6–0
Win	11–8	Feb 2012	Qatar Open, Qatar	Premier 5	Hard	(Australia) Samantha Stosur	6–1, 6–2
Win	12–8	Mar 2012	Indian Wells Open, U.S.	Premier M	Hard	(Russia) Maria Sharapova	6–2, 6–3
Loss	12–9	Apr 2012	Stuttgart Open, Germany	Premier	Clay (i)	(Russia) Maria Sharapova	1–6, 4–6
Loss	12–10	May 2012	Madrid Open, Spain	Premier M	Clay (blue)	(United States) Serena Williams	1–6, 3–6
Loss	12–11	Sep 2012	US Open, United States	Grand Slam	Hard	(United States) Serena Williams	2–6, 6–2, 5–7
Win	13–11	Oct 2012	China Open, China	Premier M	Hard	(Russia) Maria Sharapova	6–3, 6–1
Win	14–11	Oct 2012	Linz Open, Austria	International	Hard (i)	(Germany) Julia Görges	6–3, 6–4
Win	15–11	Jan 2013	Australian Open, Australia (2)	Grand Slam	Hard	(China) Li Na	4–6, 6–4, 6–3
Win	16–11	Feb 2013	Qatar Open, Qatar (2)	Premier 5	Hard	(United States) Serena Williams	7–6^{(8–6)}, 2–6, 6–3
Loss	16–12	May 2013	Italian Open, Italy	Premier 5	Clay	(United States) Serena Williams	1–6, 3–6
Loss	16–13	Aug 2013	Southern California Open, U.S.	Premier	Hard	(Australia) Samantha Stosur	2–6, 3–6
Win	17–13	Aug 2013	Cincinnati Open, U.S.	Premier 5	Hard	(United States) Serena Williams	2–6, 6–2, 7–6^{(8–6)}
Loss	17–14	Sep 2013	US Open, United States	Grand Slam	Hard	(United States) Serena Williams	5–7, 7–6^{(8–6)}, 1–6
Loss	17–15	Jan 2014	Brisbane International, Australia	Premier	Hard	(United States) Serena Williams	4–6, 5–7
Loss	17–16	Feb 2015	Qatar Open, Qatar	Premier	Hard	(Czech Republic) Lucie Šafářová	4–6, 3–6
Win	18–16	Jan 2016	Brisbane International, Australia (2)	Premier	Hard	(Germany) Angelique Kerber	6–3, 6–1
Win	19–16	Mar 2016	Indian Wells Open, U.S. (2)	Premier M	Hard	(United States) Serena Williams	6–4, 6–4
Win	20–16	Apr 2016	Miami Open, U.S. (3)	Premier M	Hard	(Russia) Svetlana Kuznetsova	6–3, 6–2
Loss	20–17	Apr 2019	Monterrey Open, Mexico	International	Hard	(Spain) Garbiñe Muguruza	1–6, 1–3 ret.
Win	21–17	Aug 2020	Cincinnati Open, U.S. (2)	Premier 5	Hard	(Japan) Naomi Osaka	walkover
Loss	21–18	Sep 2020	US Open, United States	Grand Slam	Hard	(Japan) Naomi Osaka	6–1, 3–6, 3–6
Loss	21–19	Oct 2020	Ostrava Open, Czech Republic	Premier	Hard (i)	(Belarus) Aryna Sabalenka	2–6, 2–6
Loss	21–20	Oct 2021	Indian Wells Open, U.S.	WTA 1000	Hard	(Spain) Paula Badosa	6–7^{(5–7)}, 6–2, 6–7^{(2–7)}

=== Doubles: 21 (10 titles, 11 runner–ups) ===
Legend Grand Slam (0–4) WTA 1000 (5–3) WTA 500 (2–3) WTA 250 (3–1)	Finals by surface Hard (6–8) Grass (1–1) Clay (1–2) Carpet (0–1)

Result	W–L	Date	Tournament	Tier	Surface	Partner	Opponents	Score
Loss	0–1	Feb 2006	Memphis Indoors, U.S.	Tier III	Hard	(Denmark) Caroline Wozniacki	(United States) Lisa Raymond (Australia) Samantha Stosur	6–7^{(2–7)}, 3–6
Win	1–1	Oct 2006	Tashkent Open, Uzbekistan	Tier IV	Hard	(Belarus) Tatiana Poutchek	(Italy) Maria Elena Camerin (Switzerland) Emmanuelle Gagliardi	walkover
Loss	1–2	Jul 2007	Stanford Classic, U.S.	Tier II	Hard	(Russia) Anna Chakvetadze	(India) Sania Mirza (Israel) Shahar Pe'er	4–6, 6–7^{(5–7)}
Loss	1–3	Aug 2007	Southern California Open, U.S.	Tier I	Hard	(Russia) Anna Chakvetadze	(Zimbabwe) Cara Black (United States) Liezel Huber	5–7, 4–6
Loss	1–4	Sep 2007	Luxembourg Open, Luxembourg	Tier II	Hard (i)	(Israel) Shahar Pe'er	(Czech Republic) Iveta Benešová (Slovakia) Janette Husárová	4–6, 2–6
Loss	1–5	Oct 2007	Kremlin Cup, Russia	Tier I	Carpet (i)	(Belarus) Tatiana Poutchek	(Zimbabwe) Cara Black (United States) Liezel Huber	6–4, 1–6, [7–10]
Loss	1–6	Jan 2008	Australian Open, Australia	Grand Slam	Hard	(Israel) Shahar Pe'er	(Ukraine) Alona Bondarenko (Ukraine) Kateryna Bondarenko	6–2, 1–6, 4–6
Loss	1–7	Apr 2008	Amelia Island Championships, U.S.	Tier II	Clay	(Russia) Elena Vesnina	(United States) Bethanie Mattek (Czech Republic) Vladimíra Uhlířová	3–6, 1–6
Win	2–7	Feb 2009	Memphis Indoors, U.S.	International	Hard (i)	(Denmark) Caroline Wozniacki	(Ukraine) Yuliana Fedak (Netherlands) Michaëlla Krajicek	6–1, 7–6^{(7–2)}
Win	3–7	Mar 2009	Indian Wells Open, U.S.	Premier M	Hard	(Russia) Vera Zvonareva	(Argentina) Gisela Dulko (Israel) Shahar Pe'er	6–4, 3–6, [10–5]
Loss	3–8	May 2009	French Open, France	Grand Slam	Clay	(Russia) Elena Vesnina	(Spain) Anabel Medina Garrigues (Spain) Virginia Ruano Pascual	1–6, 1–6
Win	4–8	Aug 2010	Cincinnati Open, U.S.	Premier 5	Hard	(Russia) Maria Kirilenko	(United States) Lisa Raymond (Australia) Rennae Stubbs	7–6^{(7–4)}, 7–6^{(10–8)}
Loss	4–9	Jan 2011	Australian Open, Australia	Grand Slam	Hard	(Russia) Maria Kirilenko	(Argentina) Gisela Dulko (Italy) Flavia Pennetta	6–2, 5–7, 3–6
Win	5–9	May 2011	Madrid Open, Spain	Premier M	Clay	(Russia) Maria Kirilenko	(Czech Republic) Květa Peschke (Slovenia) Katarina Srebotnik	6–4, 6–3
Win	6–9	Jul 2011	Stanford Classic, U.S.	Premier	Hard	(Russia) Maria Kirilenko	(United States) Liezel Huber (United States) Lisa Raymond	6–1, 6–3
Loss	6–10	Aug 2011	Canadian Open, Canada	Premier 5	Hard	(Russia) Maria Kirilenko	(United States) Liezel Huber (United States) Lisa Raymond	walkover
Win	7–10	Mar 2019	Abierto Mexicano Telcel, Mexico	International	Hard	(China) Zheng Saisai	(United States) Desirae Krawczyk (Mexico) Giuliana Olmos	6–1, 6–2
Win	8–10	May 2019	Italian Open, Italy	Premier 5	Clay	(Australia) Ashleigh Barty	(Germany) Anna-Lena Grönefeld (Netherlands) Demi Schuurs	4–6, 6–0, [10–3]
Loss	8–11	Sep 2019	US Open, United States	Grand Slam	Hard	(Australia) Ashleigh Barty	(Belgium) Elise Mertens (Belarus) Aryna Sabalenka	5–7, 5–7
Win	9–11	Jun 2021	German Open, Germany	WTA 500	Grass	(Belarus) Aryna Sabalenka	(United States) Nicole Melichar (Netherlands) Demi Schuurs	4–6, 7–5, [10–4]
Win	10–11	May 2023	Madrid Open, Spain (2)	WTA 1000	Clay	(Brazil) Beatriz Haddad Maia	(United States) Coco Gauff (United States) Jessica Pegula	6–1, 6–4

== ITF Circuit finals ==
=== Singles: 3 (1 title, 2 runner–ups) ===
Legend
$75,000 tournaments
$50,000 tournaments
$25,000 tournaments

Result	W–L	Date	Tournament	Tier	Surface	Opponent	Score
Loss	0–1	Apr 2005	ITF Augusta, United States	25,000	Hard	(Japan) Saori Obata	2–6, 2–6
Win	1–1	Jul 2005	ITF Pétange, Luxembourg	50,000 (Note: The $50,000 ITF tournaments were reclassified as $60,000 in 2017.)	Clay	(Ukraine) Viktoriya Kutuzova	6–4, 6–2
Loss	1–2	Nov 2006	ITF Pittsburgh, United States	75,000 (Note: The $75,000 ITF tournaments were reclassified as $75,000 in 2017.)	Hard (i)	(Canada) Aleksandra Wozniak	2–6, ret.

=== Doubles: 4 (3 titles, 1 runner–up) ===
Legend
$75,000 tournaments
$10,000 tournaments

Result	W–L	Date	Tournament	Tier	Surface	Partner	Opponents	Score
Win	1–0	Nov 2003	ITF Ramat HaSharon, Israel	10,000	Hard	(Belarus) Olga Govortsova	(United Kingdom) Natalie Neri (Israel) Danielle Steinberg	6–0, 6–3
Loss	1–1	Apr 2004	ITF Bol, Croatia	10,000	Clay	(Belarus) Olga Govortsova	(Russia) Anna Bastrikova (Russia) Alla Kudryavtseva	4–6, 1–6
Win	2–1	Nov 2005	ITF Tucson, United States	75,000	Hard	(Belarus) Tatiana Poutchek	(Brazil) Maria Fernanda Alves (Hungary) Melinda Czink	4–6, 7–6, 6–1
Win	3–1	Mar 2007	ITF Las Vegas, United States	75,000	Hard	(Belarus) Tatiana Poutchek	(Estonia) Maret Ani (Italy) Alberta Brianti	6–2, 6–4

== Junior Grand Slam tournament finals ==
=== Singles: 2 (2 titles) ===
Result	Year	Tournament	Surface	Opponent	Score
Win	2005	Australian Open	Hard	(Hungary) Ágnes Szávay	6–2, 6–2
Win	2005	US Open	Hard	(United States) Alexa Glatch	6–3, 6–4

=== Doubles: 4 (4 titles) ===
Result	Year	Tournament	Surface	Partner	Opponents	Score
Win	2004	Wimbledon	Grass	(Belarus) Volha Havartsova	(New Zealand) Marina Erakovic (Romania) Monica Niculescu	6–4, 3–6, 6–4
Win	2005	Australian Open	Hard	(New Zealand) Marina Erakovic	(Czech Republic) Nikola Fraňková (Hungary) Ágnes Szávay	6–0, 6–2
Win	2005	French Open	Clay	(Hungary) Ágnes Szávay	(Romania) Raluca-Ioana Olaru (Kazakhstan) Amina Rakhim	4–6, 6–4, 6–0
Win	2005	Wimbledon (2)	Grass	(Hungary) Ágnes Szávay	(New Zealand) Marina Erakovic (Romania) Monica Niculescu	6–7^{(5–7)}, 6–2, 6–0

== WTA Tour career earnings ==
Year	Grand Slam singles titles	WTA singles titles	Total singles titles	Earnings ($)	Money list rank
2007	0	0	0	472,224	32
2008	0	0	0	754,857	19
2009	0	3	3	2,115,536	8
2010	0	2	2	1,652,028	10
2011	0	3	3	3,771,032	3
2012	1	5	6	7,328,920	1
2013	1	2	3	6,497,165	2
2014	0	0	0	857,583	27
2015	0	0	0	1,369,657	23
2016	0	3	3	2,651,080	8
2017	0	0	0	186,746	150
2018	0	0	0	847,800	43
2019	0	0	0	1,076,516	39
2020	0	1	1	1,991,783	4
2021	0	0	0	1,426,628	19
2022	0	0	0	1,126,407	29
2023	0	0	0	1,750,396	18
2024	0	0	0	809,781	15
Career	2	19	21	37,460,500	5

== Career Grand Slam statistics ==
=== Career Grand Slam seedings ===
The tournaments won by Azarenka are in boldface, and advanced into finals by Azarenka are in italics.

Year	Australian Open	French Open	Wimbledon	US Open
2006	qualifier	qualifier	not seeded	did not play
2007	not seeded	not seeded	not seeded	not seeded
2008	26th	16th	16th	14th
2009	13th	9th	8th	8th
2010	7th	10th	14th	10th
2011	8th	4th	4th	4th
2012	**3rd (1)**	1st	2nd	1st (1)
2013	**1st (2)**	3rd	2nd	2nd (2)
2014	2nd	did not play	8th	16th
2015	not seeded	27th	23rd	20th
2016	14th	5th	did not play	did not play
2017	did not play	did not play	Protected ranking	did not play
2018	did not play	Protected ranking	not seeded	wild card
2019	not seeded	not seeded	not seeded	not seeded
2020	did not play	10th	cancelled	not seeded (3)
2021	12th	15th	12th	18th
2022	24th	15th	did not play	26th
2023	24th	18th	19th	18th
2024	18th	19th	16th	20th

=== Best Grand Slam results details ===
Grand Slam winners are in boldface, and runner–ups are in italics.

**Australian Open**
**2012 Australian Open (3rd seed)**
Round	Opponent	Rank	Score
1R	(United Kingdom) Heather Watson	No. 105	6–1, 6–0
2R	(Australia) Casey Dellacqua	No. 126	6–1, 6–0
3R	(Germany) Mona Barthel	No. 44	6–2, 6–4
4R	(Czech Republic) Iveta Benešová	No. 46	6–2, 6–2
QF	(Poland) Agnieszka Radwańska (8)	No. 8	6–7, 6–0, 6–2
SF	(Belgium) Kim Clijsters (11)	No. 14	6–4, 1–6, 6–3
**W**	(Russia) Maria Sharapova (4)	No. 4	6–3, 6–0
**2013 Australian Open (1st seed)**
Round	Opponent	Rank	Score
1R	(Romania) Monica Niculescu	No. 49	6–1, 6–4
2R	(Greece) Eleni Daniilidou	No. 94	6–1, 6–0
3R	(United States) Jamie Hampton	No. 63	6–4, 4–6, 6–2
4R	(Russia) Elena Vesnina	No. 47	6–1, 6–1
QF	(Russia) Svetlana Kuznetsova	No. 75	7–5, 6–1
SF	(United States) Sloane Stephens (29)	No. 25	6–1, 6–4
**W**	(China) Li Na (6)	No. 6	4–6, 6–4, 6–3

**Wimbledon Championships**
**2011 Wimbledon Championships (4th seed)**
Round	Opponent	Rank	Score
1R	(Slovakia) Magdaléna Rybáriková	No. 66	6–4, 3–2 ret.
2R	(Czech Republic) Iveta Benešová	No. 53	6–0, 6–3
3R	(Slovakia) Daniela Hantuchová (25)	No. 23	6–3, 3–6, 6–2
4R	(Russia) Nadia Petrova	No. 37	6–2, 6–2
QF	(Austria) Tamira Paszek	No. 80	6–3, 6–1
SF	**(Czech Republic) Petra Kvitová (8)**	No. 8	1–6, 6–3, 2–6
**2012 Wimbledon Championships (2nd seed)**
Round	Opponent	Rank	Score
1R	(United States) Irina Falconi	No. 78	6–1, 6–4
2R	(Switzerland) Romina Oprandi	No. 87	6–2, 6–0
3R	(Slovakia) Jana Čepelová (Q)	No. 178	6–3, 6–3
4R	(Serbia) Ana Ivanovic (14)	No. 14	6–1, 6–0
QF	(Austria) Tamira Paszek	No. 37	6–3, 7–6^{(7–4)}
SF	**(United States) Serena Williams (6)**	No. 6	3–6, 6–7^{(6–8)}

**French Open**
**2013 French Open (3rd seed)**
Round	Opponent	Rank	Score
1R	(Russia) Elena Vesnina	No. 38	6–1, 6–4
2R	(Germany) Annika Beck	No. 62	6–4, 6–3
3R	(France) Alizé Cornet (31)	No. 27	4–6, 6–3, 6–1
4R	(Italy) Francesca Schiavone	No. 50	6–3, 6–0
QF	(Russia) Maria Kirilenko (12)	No. 12	7–6^{(7–3)}, 6–2
SF	(Russia) Maria Sharapova (2)	No. 2	1–6, 6–2, 4–6

**US Open**
**2012 US Open (1st seed)**
Round	Opponent	Rank	Score
1R	(Russia) Alexandra Panova	No. 76	6–0, 6–1
2R	(Belgium) Kirsten Flipkens (Q)	No. 133	6–2, 6–2
3R	(China) Zheng Jie (28)	No. 28	6–0, 6–1
4R	(United States) Anna Tatishvili	No. 73	6–2, 6–2
QF	(Australia) Samantha Stosur (7)	No. 7	6–1, 4–6, 7–6^{(7–5)}
SF	(Russia) Maria Sharapova (3)	No. 3	3–6, 6–2, 6–4
F	**(United States) Serena Williams (4)**	No. 4	2–6, 6–2, 5–7
**2013 US Open (2nd seed)**
Round	Opponent	Rank	Score
1R	(Germany) Dinah Pfizenmaier	No. 99	6–0, 6–0
2R	(Canada) Aleksandra Wozniak	No. 323	6–3, 6–1
3R	(France) Alizé Cornet (26)	No. 28	6–7^{(2–7)}, 6–3, 6–2
4R	(Serbia) Ana Ivanovic (13)	No. 15	4–6, 6–3, 6–4
QF	(Slovakia) Daniela Hantuchová	No. 48	6–2, 6–3
SF	(Italy) Flavia Pennetta	No. 83	6–4, 6–2
F	**(United States) Serena Williams (1)**	**No. 1**	5–7, 7–6^{(8–6)}, 1–6
**2020 US Open (Unseeded)**
Round	Opponent	Rank	Score
1R	(Austria) Barbara Haas	No. 139	6–1, 6–2
2R	(Belarus) Aryna Sabalenka (5)	No. 11	6–1, 6–3
3R	(Poland) Iga Świątek	No. 53	6–4, 6–2
4R	(Czech Republic) Karolína Muchová (20)	No. 26	5–7, 6–1, 6–4
QF	(Belgium) Elise Mertens (16)	No. 18	6–1, 6–0
SF	(United States) Serena Williams (3)	No. 8	1–6, 6–3, 6–3
F	**(Japan) Naomi Osaka (4)**	No. 9	6–1, 3–6, 3–6

== Wins against top 10 players ==
- Azarenka has an 81–85 record against players who were, at the time the match was played, ranked in the top 10.

#	Player	Rank	Event	Surface	Rd	Score	Rk	Ref
2007
1.	(Russia) Nadia Petrova	8	Luxembourg Open, Luxembourg	Hard (i)	2R	6–2, 6–1	38	
2.	(Russia) Maria Sharapova	4	Kremlin Cup, Russia	Hard (i)	2R	7–6^{(11–9)}, 6–2	32	
2008
3.	(Russia) Anna Chakvetadze	7	Berlin Open, Germany	Clay	2R	1–6, 7–6^{(7–1)}, 6–4	26	
4.	(Poland) Agnieszka Radwańska	10	Stuttgart Open, Germany	Hard (i)	2R	6–1, 7–5	17	
5.	(Russia) Elena Dementieva	4	Stuttgart Open, Germany	Hard (i)	QF	7–6^{(8–6)}, 3–6, 6–1	17	
2009
6.	(Russia) Dinara Safina	2	Indian Wells Open, United States	Hard	QF	6–7^{(7–9)}, 6–1, 6–3	11	
7.	(Russia) Svetlana Kuznetsova	8	Miami Open, United States	Hard	SF	6–3, 2–6, 7–5	10	
8.	(United States) Serena Williams	1	Miami Open, United States	Hard	F	6–3, 6–1	10	
9.	(Serbia) Ana Ivanovic	8	French Open, France	Clay	4R	6–2, 6–3	9	
10.	(Russia) Nadia Petrova	10	Wimbledon, United Kingdom	Grass	4R	7–6^{(7–5)}, 2–6, 6–3	8	
11.	(Serbia) Jelena Janković	8	WTA Tour Championships, Qatar	Hard	RR	6–2, 6–3	6	
2010
12.	(Russia) Vera Zvonareva	9	Australian Open, Australia	Hard	4R	4–6, 6–4, 6–0	7	
13.	(Poland) Agnieszka Radwańska	9	Dubai Championships, UAE	Hard	SF	6–3, 6–4	6	
14.	(Poland) Agnieszka Radwańska	8	Eastbourne International, UK	Grass	1R	7–6^{(7–2)}, 6–1	15	
15.	(Belgium) Kim Clijsters	9	Eastbourne International, UK	Grass	QF	7–6^{(8–6)}, 6–4	15	
16.	(Australia) Samantha Stosur	5	Stanford Classic, United States	Hard	SF	6–2, 6–3	18	
17.	(China) Li Na	10	Canadian Open, Canada	Hard	3R	6–3, 6–3	13	
18.	(Serbia) Jelena Janković	8	WTA Tour Championships, Qatar	Hard	RR	6–4, 6–1	10	
2011
19.	(Poland) Agnieszka Radwańska	10	Fed Cup, Israel	Hard	PO	7–5, 7–5	9	
20.	(Poland) Agnieszka Radwańska	10	Indian Wells Open, United States	Hard	4R	4–6, 6–3, 7–6^{(7–3)}	9	
21.	(Belgium) Kim Clijsters	2	Miami Open, United States	Hard	QF	6–3, 6–3	8	
22.	(Russia) Vera Zvonareva	3	Miami Open, United States	Hard	SF	6–0, 6–3	8	
23.	(France) Marion Bartoli	10	Pan Pacific Open, Japan	Hard	QF	7–5, 6–0	3	
24.	(Australia) Samantha Stosur	7	WTA Tour Championships, Turkey	Hard	RR	6–2, 6–2	4	
25.	(China) Li Na	5	WTA Tour Championships, Turkey	Hard	RR	6–2, 6–2	4	
26.	(Russia) Vera Zvonareva	6	WTA Tour Championships, Turkey	Hard	SF	6–2, 6–3	4	
2012
27.	(France) Marion Bartoli	9	Sydney International, Australia	Hard	QF	7–5, 6–4	3	
28.	(Poland) Agnieszka Radwańska	8	Sydney International, Australia	Hard	SF	1–6, 6–3, 6–2	3	
29.	(China) Li Na	5	Sydney International, Australia	Hard	F	6–2, 1–6, 6–3	3	
30.	(Poland) Agnieszka Radwańska	8	Australian Open, Australia	Hard	QF	6–7^{(0–7)}, 6–0, 6–2	3	
31.	(Russia) Maria Sharapova	4	Australian Open, Australia	Hard	F	6–3, 6–0	3	
32.	(Poland) Agnieszka Radwańska	6	Qatar Open, Qatar	Hard	SF	6–2, 6–4	1	
33.	(Australia) Samantha Stosur	5	Qatar Open, Qatar	Hard	F	6–1, 6–2	1	
34.	(Poland) Agnieszka Radwańska	5	Indian Wells Open, United States	Hard	QF	6–0, 6–2	1	
35.	(Russia) Maria Sharapova	2	Indian Wells Open, United States	Hard	F	6–2, 6–3	1	
36.	(Poland) Agnieszka Radwańska	4	Stuttgart Open, Germany	Clay (i)	SF	6–1, 6–3	1	
37.	(China) Li Na	8	Madrid Open, Spain	Clay	QF	3–6, 6–3, 6–3	1	
38.	(Poland) Agnieszka Radwańska	3	Madrid Open, Spain	Clay	SF	6–2, 6–4	1	
39.	(Germany) Angelique Kerber	7	London Summer Olympics, United Kingdom	Grass	QF	6–4, 7–5	1	
40.	(Australia) Samantha Stosur	7	US Open, United States	Hard	QF	6–1, 4–6, 7–6^{(7–5)}	1	
41.	(Russia) Maria Sharapova	3	US Open, United States	Hard	SF	3–6, 6–2, 6–4	1	
42.	(France) Marion Bartoli	10	China Open, China	Hard	SF	6–4, 6–2	1	
43.	(Russia) Maria Sharapova	2	China Open, China	Hard	F	6–3, 6–1	1	
44.	(China) Li Na	8	WTA Tour Championships, Turkey	Hard	RR	7–6^{(7–4)}, 6–4	1	
45.	(Germany) Angelique Kerber	5	WTA Tour Championships, Turkey	Hard	RR	6–7^{(13–15)}, 7–6^{(7–2)}, 6–4	1	
2013
46.	(China) Li Na	6	Australian Open, Australia	Hard	F	4–6, 6–4, 6–3	1	
47.	(Italy) Sara Errani	7	Qatar Open, Qatar	Hard	QF	6–2, 6–2	1	
48.	(Poland) Agnieszka Radwańska	4	Qatar Open, Qatar	Hard	SF	6–3, 6–3	1	
49.	(United States) Serena Williams	2	Qatar Open, Qatar	Hard	F	7–6^{(8–6)}, 2–6, 6–3	1	
50.	(Australia) Samantha Stosur	10	Italian Open, Italy	Clay	QF	6–4, 1–6, 6–3	3	
51.	(Italy) Sara Errani	6	Italian Open, Italy	Clay	SF	6–0, 7–5	3	
52.	(Denmark) Caroline Wozniacki	10	Cincinnati Open, United States	Hard	QF	6–3, 7–6^{(7–5)}	2	
53.	(United States) Serena Williams	1	Cincinnati Open, United States	Hard	F	2–6, 6–2, 7–6^{(8–6)}	2	
54.	(Italy) Sara Errani	7	WTA Tour Championships, Turkey	Hard	RR	7–6^{(7–4)}, 6–2	2	
2014
55.	(Serbia) Jelena Janković	8	Brisbane International, Australia	Hard	SF	1–6, 6–3, 6–4	2	
2015
56.	(Denmark) Caroline Wozniacki	8	Australian Open, Australia	Hard	2R	6–4, 6–2	44	
57.	(Denmark) Caroline Wozniacki	5	Qatar Open, Qatar	Hard	QF	6–3, 6–1	48	
58.	(Denmark) Caroline Wozniacki	5	Italian Open, Italy	Clay	2R	6–2, 7–6^{(7–2)}	29	
59.	(Czech Republic) Petra Kvitová	4	Canadian Open, United States	Hard	2R	6–2, 6–3	21	
60.	(Denmark) Caroline Wozniacki	5	Cincinnati Open, United States	Hard	2R	6–0, 6–4	21	
2016
61.	(Germany) Angelique Kerber	10	Brisbane International, Australia	Hard	F	6–3, 6–1	22	
62.	(United States) Serena Williams	1	Indian Wells Open, United States	Hard	F	6–4, 6–4	15	
63.	(Spain) Garbiñe Muguruza	4	Miami Open, United States	Hard	4R	7–6^{(8–6)}, 7–6^{(7–4)}	8	
64.	(Germany) Angelique Kerber	3	Miami Open, United States	Hard	SF	6–2, 7–5	8	
2018
65.	(Czech Republic) Karolína Plíšková	6	Miami Open, United States	Hard	QF	7–5, 6–3	186	
2019
66.	(Germany) Angelique Kerber	5	Monterrey Open, Mexico	Hard	SF	6–4, 4–6, 6–1	67	
67.	(Czech Republic) Karolína Plíšková	4	Stuttgart Open, Germany	Clay (i)	2R	4–6, 6–3, 6–4	61	
68.	(Ukraine) Elina Svitolina	6	Italian Open, Italy	Clay	2R	4–6, 6–1, 7–5	51	
2020
69.	(United States) Serena Williams	8	US Open, United States	Hard	SF	1–6, 6–3, 6–3	27	
70.	(United States) Sofia Kenin	5	Italian Open, Italy	Clay	2R	6–0, 6–0	14	
2021
71.	(Ukraine) Elina Svitolina	5	Qatar Open, Qatar	Hard	QF	6–2, 6–4	14	
2022
72.	(Spain) Paula Badosa	8	Adelaide International, Australia	Hard	1R	6–3, 6–2	27	
73.	(Spain) Paula Badosa	8	Guadalajara Open, Mexico	Hard	2R	6–2, ret.	37	
74.	(United States) Coco Gauff	7	Guadalajara Open, Mexico	Hard	QF	7–6^{(7–2)}, 4–6, 6–3	37	
2023
75.	(United States) Jessica Pegula	3	Australian Open, Australia	Hard	QF	6–4, 6–1	24	
76.	Daria Kasatkina	10	Wimbledon, United Kingdom	Grass	3R	6–2, 6–4	20	
2024
77.	(Latvia) Jeļena Ostapenko	10	Australian Open, Australia	Hard	3R	6–1, 7–5	22	
78.	(China) Zheng Qinwen	7	Miami Open, United States	Hard	3R	6–4, 7–5	32	
79.	(Greece) Maria Sakkari	8	Italian Open, Italy	Clay	4R	6–4, 6–1	24	
80.	(Greece) Maria Sakkari	9	Berlin Open, Germany	Grass	1R	6–4, 6–2	19	
81.	(Kazakhstan) Elena Rybakina	4	Berlin Open, Germany	Grass	QF	3–1, ret.	19	

- Additional top 10 sources

== Double bagel matches (6–0, 6–0) ==
Result	Year	W–L	Tournament	Tier	Surface	Opponent	Rank	Round	Rk
Win	2008	1–0	French Open, France	Grand Slam	Clay	(Romania) Sorana Cîrstea	78	2R	17
Win	2008	2–0	Zurich Open, Switzerland	Tier II	Hard	(Romania) Monica Niculescu	66	2R	18
Win	2009	3–0	Wimbledon, UK	Grand Slam	Grass	(Romania) Raluca Olaru	75	2R	8
Win	2011	4–0	Madrid Open, Spain	Premier M	Clay	(Russia) Vera Dushevina	59	1R	5
Win	2011	5–0	Canadian Open, Canada	Premier 5	Hard	(Canada) Stéphanie Dubois	108	2R	4
Win	2013	6–0	Qatar Open, Qatar	Premier 5	Hard	(United States) Christina McHale	44	3R	1
Win	2013	7–0	US Open, USA	Grand Slam	Hard	(Germany) Dinah Pfizenmaier	99	1R	2
Win	2016	8–0	Australian Open, Australia	Grand Slam	Hard	(Belgium) Alison Van Uytvanck	43	1R	16
Win	2016	9–0	Indian Wells, USA	Premier M	Hard	(Slovakia) Magdaléna Rybáriková	97	QF	15
Win	2020	10–0	Italian Open, Italy	Premier 5	Clay	(United States) Sofia Kenin	5	2R	14
Win	2025	11–0	French Open, France	Grand Slam	Clay	(Belgium) Yanina Wickmayer	1140	1R	75

== Winning streaks ==
Victoria Azarenka has one 20+-match win streak: 26 (2012)

=== 26-match win streak 2012 ===
Azarenka's 26 match winning streak was the best start to a WTA Tour season since Martina Hingis won 37 in a row in 1997.

#	Tournament	Category	Start date	Surface	Rd	Opponent	Rank	Score
–	WTA Finals Istanbul, Turkey	Finals	25 October 2011	Hard (i)	F	(Czech Republic) Petra Kvitová	3	5–7, 6–4, 3–6
1	Sydney International, Australia	Premier	8 January 2012	Hard	1R	(Switzerland) Stefanie Vögele	140	6–2, 6–1
2	Sydney International, Australia	Premier	8 January 2012	Hard	2R	(Serbia) Jelena Janković	14	6–4, 6–2
3	Sydney International, Australia	Premier	8 January 2012	Hard	QF	(France) Marion Bartoli	9	7–5, 6–4
4	Sydney International, Australia	Premier	8 January 2012	Hard	SF	(Poland) Agnieszka Radwańska	8	1–6, 6–3, 6–2
5	Sydney International, Australia	Premier	8 January 2012	Hard	F	(China) Li Na	5	6–2, 1–6, 6–3
6	Australian Open	Grand Slam	16 January 2012	Hard	1R	(United Kingdom) Heather Watson	105	6–1, 6–0
7	Australian Open	Grand Slam	16 January 2012	Hard	2R	(Australia) Casey Dellacqua	126	6–1, 6–0
8	Australian Open	Grand Slam	16 January 2012	Hard	3R	(Germany) Mona Barthel	44	6–2, 6–4
9	Australian Open	Grand Slam	16 January 2012	Hard	4R	(Czech Republic) Iveta Benešová	46	6–2, 6–2
10	Australian Open	Grand Slam	16 January 2012	Hard	QF	(Poland) Agnieszka Radwańska (2)	8	6–7^{(0–7)}, 6–0, 6–2
11	Australian Open	Grand Slam	16 January 2012	Hard	SF	(Belgium) Kim Clijsters	14	6–4, 1–6, 6–3
12	Australian Open	Grand Slam	16 January 2012	Hard	F	(Russia) Maria Sharapova	4	6–3, 6–0
13	Qatar Open, Qatar	Premier 5	13 February 2012	Hard	2R	(Germany) Mona Barthel (2)	39	6–1, 6–0
14	Qatar Open, Qatar	Premier 5	13 February 2012	Hard	3R	(Romania) Simona Halep	63	6–3, 6–1
15	Qatar Open, Qatar	Premier 5	13 February 2012	Hard	QF	(Belgium) Yanina Wickmayer	27	6–0, 6–4
16	Qatar Open, Qatar	Premier 5	13 February 2012	Hard	SF	(Poland) Agnieszka Radwańska (3)	6	6–2, 6–4
17	Qatar Open, Qatar	Premier 5	13 February 2012	Hard	F	(Australia) Samantha Stosur	5	6–1, 6–2
18	Indian Wells Open, United States	Premier M	5 March 2012	Hard	2R	(Germany) Mona Barthel (3)	37	6–4, 6–7^{(4–7)}, 7–6^{(8–6)}
19	Indian Wells Open, United States	Premier M	5 March 2012	Hard	3R	(Russia) Svetlana Kuznetsova	27	6–2, 6–4
20	Indian Wells Open, United States	Premier M	5 March 2012	Hard	4R	(Germany) Julia Görges	15	6–3, 6–1
21	Indian Wells Open, United States	Premier M	5 March 2012	Hard	QF	(Poland) Agnieszka Radwańska (4)	5	6–0, 6–2
22	Indian Wells Open, United States	Premier M	5 March 2012	Hard	SF	(Germany) Angelique Kerber	19	6–4, 6–3
23	Indian Wells Open, United States	Premier M	5 March 2012	Hard	F	(Russia) Maria Sharapova (2)	2	6–2, 6–3
24	Miami Open, United States	Premier M	19 March 2012	Hard	2R	(Netherlands) Michaëlla Krajicek	71	6–3, 7–5
25	Miami Open, United States	Premier M	19 March 2012	Hard	3R	(United Kingdom) Heather Watson (2)	129	6–0, 6–2
26	Miami Open, United States	Premier M	19 March 2012	Hard	4R	(Slovakia) Dominika Cibulková	18	1–6, 7–6^{(9–7)}, 7–5
–	Miami Open, United States	Premier M	19 March 2012	Hard	QF	(France) Marion Bartoli	7	3–6, 3–6

== Notes ==
Sporting positions
Preceded by Caroline Wozniacki; Maria Sharapova	World No. 1; 30 January 2012 – 10 June 2012; 9 July 2012 – 17 February 2013	Succeeded by Maria Sharapova; Serena Williams
Awards
Preceded by Michaëlla Krajicek	ITF Junior World Champion; 2005	Succeeded by Anastasia Pavlyuchenkova
Preceded by Serena Williams & Venus Williams	WTA Fan Favorite Doubles Team of the Year (with Maria Kirilenko); 2011	Succeeded by Serena Williams & Venus Williams
Preceded by Caroline Wozniacki	Diamond Aces; 2012, 2013	Succeeded by Petra Kvitová
