= List of career achievements by Victoria Azarenka =

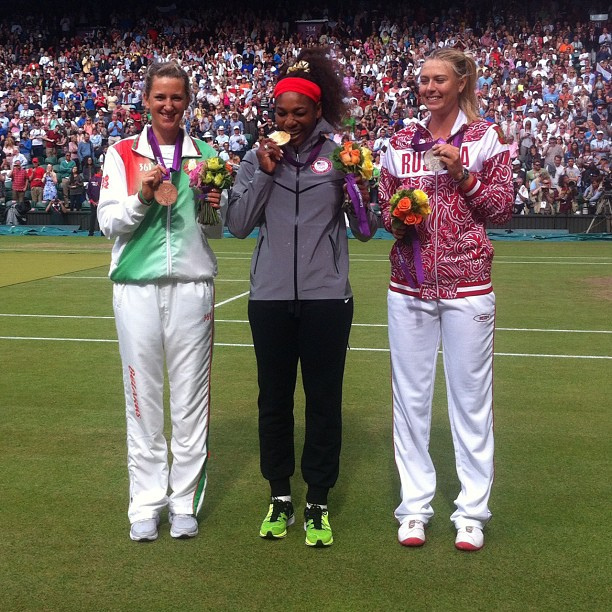
Azarenka (left) won the bronze medal in singles at the 2012 London Olympics.

This is a list of career achievements by Belarusian tennis player Victoria Azarenka.

== Grand Slam ==
- By winning the 2012 Australian Open, Victoria Azarenka not only became the first Belarusian player, male or female, to win a Grand Slam singles title; she also became the first player from her country to ascend to the world number one ranking.
- Azarenka has three times dethroned reigning champions at Grand Slam tournaments: at the 2009 French Open, on the same day Rafael Nadal suffered his first defeat at the French Open at the hands of Robin Söderling, Azarenka defeated 2008 champion Ana Ivanovic in straight sets in the fourth round; she also advanced to the quarter-finals of a Grand Slam tournament for the first time by virtue of this victory. She also defeated reigning Australian and US Open champions Kim Clijsters and Samantha Stosur on her way to reaching her first two Grand Slam finals at those respective events in 2012, winning her first Grand Slam title at the former.

== Overall ==
- By reaching the semi-finals of (and eventually winning) the 2009 Sony Ericsson Open, Azarenka became just the second Belarusian, after Natasha Zvereva, to be ranked in the top ten of the WTA rankings.
- In 2012, Azarenka won her first 26 matches of the season, before losing to Marion Bartoli in the quarter-finals of the Sony Ericsson Open in March.
- Azarenka has reigned as world number one for a total of 51 weeks, which is the longest by any player, male or female, from Belarus.
- Azarenka combined with compatriot Max Mirnyi to win the Mixed Doubles Gold Medal at the 2012 Summer Olympics, defeating the British pairing of Andy Murray and Laura Robson. Murray had just won Gold in the Men's Singles event earlier in the day.
- By defeating Li Na in the round robin stage of the 2012 WTA Tour Championships, Azarenka became the eleventh year-end number one since the WTA rankings were first calculated in 1974. She was also the first player from her country to achieve this.
- On 28 July 2014, Azarenka marked 200 consecutive weeks in the top ten, a feat managed by no other player during this period. This streak came to an end when she was defeated by Venus Williams in the second round of the 2014 Bank of the West Classic, but as a result of her reaching the quarter-finals of the 2014 Rogers Cup, and Ana Ivanovic's failure to defend her points, Azarenka returned to the top ten in the week starting 11 August 2014.

== See also ==
- Victoria Azarenka career statistics

Sporting positions
Preceded by Caroline Wozniacki; Maria Sharapova	World No. 1; 30 January 2012 – 10 June 2012; 9 July 2012 – 17 February 2013	Succeeded by Maria Sharapova; Serena Williams
Awards
Preceded by Michaëlla Krajicek	ITF Junior World Champion; 2005	Succeeded by Anastasia Pavlyuchenkova
Preceded by Serena Williams & Venus Williams	WTA Fan Favorite Doubles Team of the Year (with Maria Kirilenko); 2011	Succeeded by Serena Williams & Venus Williams
Preceded by Caroline Wozniacki	Diamond Aces; 2012, 2013	Succeeded by Petra Kvitová
