= 2011 Rogers Cup – Men's doubles =

Men's doubles
- 2011 Rogers Cup

Final
- Champions: (France) Michaël Llodra (Serbia) Nenad Zimonjić
- Runners-up: (United States) Bob Bryan (United States) Mike Bryan
- Score: 6–4, 6–7^{(5–7)}, [10–5]

Details
- Draw: 28
- Seeds: 8

Events
Singles	men	women
Doubles	men	women
- Rogers Cup

Bob and Mike Bryan were the defending champions and they reached the final. Michaël Llodra and Nenad Zimonjić defeated them 6–4, 6–7^{(5–7)}, [10–5] and won the title.

== Seeds ==
The top eight seeds received a bye into the second round.

1. (United States) Bob Bryan / (United States) Mike Bryan (final)
2. (Belarus) Max Mirnyi / (Canada) Daniel Nestor (semifinals)
3. (India) Mahesh Bhupathi / (India) Leander Paes (second round)
4. (France) Michaël Llodra / (Serbia) Nenad Zimonjić (champions)
5. (India) Rohan Bopanna / (Pakistan) Aisam-ul-Haq Qureshi (quarterfinals, retired)
6. (Sweden) Robert Lindstedt / (Romania) Horia Tecău (second round)
7. (Poland) Mariusz Fyrstenberg / (Poland) Marcin Matkowski (quarterfinals)
8. (United States) Eric Butorac / (Curaçao) Jean-Julien Rojer (second round)

== Draw ==
Key

- Q = Qualifier
- WC = Wild card
- LL = Lucky loser
- Alt = Alternate
- ITF = ITF entry
- PR = Protected ranking
- SR = Special ranking
- SE = Special exempt
- JE = Junior exempt
- JR = Junior Accelerator Programme entrant
- CO = College Accelerator Programme entrant
- NG = Next Gen Accelerator Program entrant
- w/o = Walkover
- r = Retired
- d = Defaulted

=== Finals ===
Semifinals

Final

1
- (United States) Bob Bryan
- (United States) Mike Bryan
6
6

- (Czech Republic) Tomáš Berdych
- (Germany) Florian Mayer
2
1

1
- (United States) Bob Bryan
- (United States) Mike Bryan
4
7^{7}
[5]

4
- (France) Michaël Llodra
- (Serbia) Nenad Zimonjić
6
6^{5}
[10]

4
- (France) Michaël Llodra
- (Serbia) Nenad Zimonjić
6
6

2
- (Belarus) Max Mirnyi
- (Canada) Daniel Nestor
3
4

=== Top half ===
First round

Second round

Quarterfinals

Semifinals

1
- (United States) B Bryan
- (United States) M Bryan
6
7^{7}

- (Spain) F López
- (Spain) F Verdasco
6
6

- (Spain) F López
- (Spain) F Verdasco
3
6^{3}

WC
- (Canada) V Pospisil
- (Canada) A Shamasdin
4
3

1
- (United States) B Bryan
- (United States) M Bryan
3

- (Australia) P Hanley
- (Brazil) B Soares
6
6

5
- (India) R Bopanna
- (Pakistan) A-u-H Qureshi
3^{r}

- (Spain) N Almagro
- (Czech Republic) L Dlouhý
3
2

- (Australia) P Hanley
- (Brazil) B Soares
4
6^{6}

5
- (India) R Bopanna
- (Pakistan) A-u-H Qureshi
6
7^{8}

1
- (United States) B Bryan
- (United States) M Bryan
6
6

- (Czech Republic) T Berdych
- (Germany) F Mayer
2
1

3
- (India) M Bhupathi
- (India) L Paes
1
6^{9}

- (Spain) M López
- (Spain) R Nadal
3
6^{5}

- (Czech Republic) T Berdych
- (Germany) F Mayer
6
7^{11}

- (Czech Republic) T Berdych
- (Germany) F Mayer
6
7^{7}

- (Czech Republic) T Berdych
- (Germany) F Mayer
6
6

- (United Kingdom) A Murray
- (United Kingdom) J Murray
6
2
[10]

- (United Kingdom) A Murray
- (United Kingdom) J Murray
4
4

WC
(Canada) É Chvojka
(Canada) P-L Duclos
2
6
[7]

- (United Kingdom) A Murray
- (United Kingdom) J Murray
6
2
[10]

8
- (United States) E Butorac
- (Curaçao) J-J Rojer
2
6
[8]

=== Bottom half ===
First round

Second round

Quarterfinals

Semifinals

7
- (Poland) M Fyrstenberg
- (Poland) M Matkowski
3
7^{7}
[10]

- (The Bahamas) M Knowles
- (Germany) P Petzschner
7
3
[10]

- (Serbia) N Djokovic
- (Serbia) J Tipsarević
6
6^{4}
[5]

- (Serbia) N Djokovic
- (Serbia) J Tipsarević
5
6
[12]

7
- (Poland) M Fyrstenberg
- (Poland) M Matkowski
6
3
[9]

Alt
- (Argentina) JI Chela
- (Argentina) J Mónaco
6
6

4
- (France) M Llodra
- (Serbia) N Zimonjić
3
6
[11]

- (France) R Gasquet
- (France) G Simon
4
1

Alt
- (Argentina) JI Chela
- (Argentina) J Mónaco
1
3

4
- (France) M Llodra
- (Serbia) N Zimonjić
6
6

4
- (France) M Llodra
- (Serbia) N Zimonjić
6
6

2
- (Belarus) M Mirnyi
- (Canada) D Nestor
3
4

6
- (Sweden) R Lindstedt
- (Romania) H Tecău
4
3

- (Ukraine) A Dolgopolov
- (Belgium) D Norman
2
4

- (France) J-W Tsonga
- (Switzerland) S Wawrinka
6
6

- (France) J-W Tsonga
- (Switzerland) S Wawrinka
6
6

- (France) J-W Tsonga
- (Switzerland) S Wawrinka
5
6^{5}

- (Ukraine) S Stakhovsky
- (Russia) M Youzhny
6
7

2
- (Belarus) M Mirnyi
- (Canada) D Nestor
7
7^{7}

- (Spain) P Andújar
- (France) G Monfils
3
5

- (Ukraine) S Stakhovsky
- (Russia) M Youzhny
4
4

2
- (Belarus) M Mirnyi
- (Canada) D Nestor
6
6
