= 2009 BNP Paribas Open =

- Date: March 9–22
- Edition: 36th (ATP) / 21st (WTA)
- Category: World Tour Masters 1000 (ATP); Premier Mandatory (WTA)
- Prize money: $3,645,000
- Surface: Hard / outdoor
- Location: Indian Wells, California, US
- Venue: Indian Wells Tennis Garden

Champions

Men's singles
- (Spain) Rafael Nadal

Women's singles
- (Russia) Vera Zvonareva

Men's doubles
- (United States) Andy Roddick / (United States) Mardy Fish

Women's doubles
- (Russia) Vera Zvonareva / (Belarus) Victoria Azarenka
← 2008 ·	Indian Wells Open	· 2010 →

The 2009 BNP Paribas Open was a tennis tournament played on outdoor hard courts. It was the 36th edition of the men's event (21st for the women), also known as the Indian Wells Open, and was classified as an ATP World Tour Masters 1000 event on the 2009 ATP World Tour and a Premier Mandatory event on the 2009 WTA Tour. Both the men's and the women's events took place at the Indian Wells Tennis Garden in Indian Wells, California, United States from March 9 through March 22, 2009.

== Finals ==
=== Men's singles ===
(Spain) Rafael Nadal defeated (United Kingdom) Andy Murray 6–1, 6–2

- It was Nadal's second title of the year, 33rd of his career, and his second title at Indian Wells.

=== Women's singles ===
(Russia) Vera Zvonareva defeated (Serbia) Ana Ivanovic 7–6^{(7–5)}, 6–2

- It was Zvonareva's second title of the year and 9th of her career.

=== Men's doubles ===
(United States) Andy Roddick / (United States) Mardy Fish defeated (Belarus) Max Mirnyi / (Israel) Andy Ram 3–6, 6–1 [14–12]

=== Women's doubles ===
(Russia) Vera Zvonareva / (Belarus) Victoria Azarenka defeated (Argentina) Gisela Dulko / (Israel) Shahar Pe'er 6–4, 3–6, [10–5]

== ATP entrants ==
=== Seeds ===
Athlete	Nationality	Ranking*	Seeding
Rafael Nadal	Spain	1	1
Roger Federer	Switzerland	2	2
Novak Djokovic	Serbia	3	3
Andy Murray	United Kingdom	4	4
Nikolay Davydenko	Russia	5	5
Juan Martín del Potro	Argentina	6	6
Andy Roddick	United States	7	7
Gilles Simon	France	8	8
Gaël Monfils	France	9	9
Fernando Verdasco	Spain	10	10
Jo-Wilfried Tsonga	France	11	11
David Ferrer	Spain	12	12
James Blake	United States	13	13
David Nalbandian	Argentina	14	14
Tommy Robredo	Spain	15	15
Stanislas Wawrinka	Switzerland	16	16

- Rankings as of March 2, 2009.

=== Other entrants ===
The following players received wildcards into the main draw:

- (United States) Taylor Dent
- (United States) John Isner
- (United States) Wayne Odesnik
- (United States) Ryan Sweeting
- (South Africa) Kevin Anderson

The following players received entry from the qualifying draw:

- (United States) Robert Kendrick
- (United States) Kevin Kim
- (United States) Michael Russell
- (United States) Todd Widom
- (United States) Brendan Evans
- (Germany) Michael Berrer
- (Germany) Björn Phau
- (South Africa) Rik de Voest
- (Austria) Daniel Köllerer
- (Switzerland) Michael Lammer
- (Colombia) Santiago Giraldo
- (Brazil) Thomaz Bellucci
