= 2011 Rogers Cup – Men's singles =

Men's singles
- 2011 Rogers Cup

Final
- Champion: (Serbia) Novak Djokovic
- Runner-up: (United States) Mardy Fish
- Score: 6–2, 3–6, 6–4

Events
Singles	men	women
Doubles	men	women
- Rogers Cup

Novak Djokovic defeated Mardy Fish in the final, 6–2, 3–6, 6–4 to win the men's singles tennis title at the 2011 Canadian Open. It was his 10th career Masters title, and he became the first man to win five Masters titles in the same year. This was also the first tournament where Djokovic competed as the world No. 1.

Andy Murray was the two-time defending champion, but lost to Kevin Anderson in the second round.

== Seeds ==
The top eight seeds receive a bye into the second round.

1. (Serbia) Novak Djokovic (champion)
2. (Spain) Rafael Nadal (second round)
3. (Switzerland) Roger Federer (third round)
4. (United Kingdom) Andy Murray (second round)
5. (France) Gaël Monfils (quarterfinals)
6. (United States) Mardy Fish (final)
7. (Czech Republic) Tomáš Berdych (quarterfinals)
8. (Spain) Nicolás Almagro (quarterfinals)
9. (France) Gilles Simon (first round)
10. (France) Richard Gasquet (third round)
11. (Russia) Mikhail Youzhny (first round)
12. (Serbia) Viktor Troicki (third round)
13. (France) Jo-Wilfried Tsonga (semifinals, retired)
14. (Switzerland) Stan Wawrinka (quarterfinals)
15. (Spain) Fernando Verdasco (second round)
16. (Argentina) Juan Martín del Potro (second round)

== Main draw ==
Key

- Q = Qualifier
- WC = Wild card
- LL = Lucky loser
- Alt = Alternate
- ITF = ITF entry
- PR = Protected ranking
- SR = Special ranking
- SE = Special exempt
- JE = Junior exempt
- JR = Junior Accelerator Programme entrant
- CO = College Accelerator Programme entrant
- NG = Next Gen Accelerator Program entrant
- w/o = Walkover
- r = Retired
- d = Defaulted

=== Finals ===
Quarterfinals
1	(Serbia) Novak Djokovic	6	6
5	(France) Gaël Monfils	2	1
13	(France) Jo-Wilfried Tsonga	6	6
8	(Spain) Nicolás Almagro	4	4
6	(United States) Mardy Fish	6	6^{8}	6
14	(Switzerland) Stan Wawrinka	3	7^{10}	0
7	(Czech Republic) Tomáš Berdych	4	4
(Serbia) Janko Tipsarević	6	6

Semifinals
1	(Serbia) Novak Djokovic	6	3
13	(France) Jo-Wilfried Tsonga	4	0^{r}
6	(United States) Mardy Fish	6	6
(Serbia) Janko Tipsarević	3	4

Final
1	(Serbia) Novak Djokovic	6	3	6
6	(United States) Mardy Fish	2	6	4

=== Top half ===
==== Section 1 ====
First round
(Russia) N Davydenko	6	6
Q	(Italy) F Cipolla	3	3
(Italy) A Seppi	5	4
(Croatia) M Čilić	7	6
(Finland) J Nieminen	4	0
16	(Argentina) JM del Potro	6	6
12	(Serbia) V Troicki	2	6	6
Q	(United States) M Yani	6	3	1
(Cyprus) M Baghdatis	3	4
(United States) J Isner	6	6
Q	(United States) A Bogomolov Jr.	6	7^{7}
(France) A Mannarino	2	6^{4}

Second round
1	(Serbia) N Djokovic	7	6
(Russia) N Davydenko	5	1
(Croatia) M Čilić	6	6
16	(Argentina) JM del Potro	3	4
12	(Serbia) V Troicki	6	3	6
(United States) J Isner	4	6	2
Q	(United States) A Bogomolov Jr.	2	6^{5}
5	(France) G Monfils	6	7^{7}

Third round
1	(Serbia) N Djokovic	7	6
(Croatia) M Čilić	5	2
12	(Serbia) V Troicki	6	6^{0}	6^{5}
5	(France) G Monfils	3	7^{7}	7^{7}

Quarterfinals
1	(Serbia) N Djokovic	6	6
5	(France) G Monfils	2	1

==== Section 2 ====
First round
(Argentina) JI Chela	6	3	4
WC	(Canada) V Pospisil	4	6	6
WC	(Australia) B Tomic	7^{7}	6
LL	(Chinese Taipei) Y-h Lu	6^{5}	3
(Italy) F Fognini	4	6^{0}
13	(France) J-W Tsonga	6	7^{7}
10	(France) R Gasquet	6	6
(Germany) F Mayer	3	2
(Kazakhstan) A Golubev	5	6^{6}
(Brazil) T Bellucci	7	7^{8}
(Ukraine) S Stakhovsky	6	7
(Germany) P Kohlschreiber	2	5

Second round
3	(Switzerland) R Federer	7	6
WC	(Canada) V Pospisil	5	3
WC	(Australia) B Tomic	3	6^{1}
13	(France) J-W Tsonga	6	7^{7}
10	(France) R Gasquet	6	6
(Brazil) T Bellucci	1	4
(Ukraine) S Stakhovsky	2	6^{5}
8	(Spain) N Almagro	6	7^{7}

Third round
3	(Switzerland) R Federer	6^{3}	6	1
13	(France) J-W Tsonga	7^{7}	4	6
10	(France) R Gasquet	6^{5}	3
8	(Spain) N Almagro	7^{7}	6

Quarterfinals
13	(France) J-W Tsonga	6	6
8	(Spain) N Almagro	4	4

=== Bottom half ===
==== Section 3 ====
First round
(Spain) F López	6	4	6
SE	(Czech Republic) R Štěpánek	4	6	4
WC	(Latvia) E Gulbis	3	6	7
PR	(Spain) JC Ferrero	6	1	5
(France) M Llodra	3	6	7^{7}
11	(Russia) M Youzhny	6	3	6^{4}
14	(Switzerland) S Wawrinka	6	6
(Argentina) D Nalbandian	1	4
Q	(United States) M Russell	7	6
(Spain) A Montañés	5	2
(Spain) P Andújar	4	4
(South Africa) K Anderson	6	6

Second round
6	(United States) M Fish	6	6
(Spain) F López	2	3
WC	(Latvia) E Gulbis	6	1
(France) M Llodra	4	0	r
14	(Switzerland) S Wawrinka	6	6
Q	(United States) M Russell	3	2
(South Africa) K Anderson	6	6
4	(United Kingdom) A Murray	3	1

Third round
6	(United States) M Fish	4	6	6
WC	(Latvia) E Gulbis	6	3	4
14	(Switzerland) S Wawrinka	6	4	6
(South Africa) K Anderson	4	6	4

Quarterfinals
6	(United States) M Fish	6	6^{8}	6
14	(Switzerland) S Wawrinka	3	7^{10}	0

==== Section 4 ====
First round
(Ukraine) A Dolgopolov	6	5	6
WC	(Canada) É Chvojka	3	7	4
PR	(Croatia) I Karlović	6^{2}	6	7^{7}
(Argentina) J Mónaco	7^{7}	3	6^{5}
Q	(Germany) P Petzschner	7	6
9	(France) G Simon	5	2
15	(Spain) F Verdasco	5	6	6
Q	(Germany) T Kamke	7	3	3
(Serbia) J Tipsarević	7	6
Q	(Colombia) A Falla	5	1
(Croatia) I Dodig	6	6
(France) J Chardy	3	4

Second round
7	(Czech Republic) T Berdych	4	6	6
(Ukraine) A Dolgopolov	6	2	3
PR	(Croatia) I Karlović	6^{0}	7^{7}	7^{8}
Q	(Germany) P Petzschner	7^{7}	6^{2}	6^{6}
15	(Spain) F Verdasco	4	7^{7}	3
(Serbia) J Tipsarević	6	6^{5}	6
(Croatia) I Dodig	1	7^{7}	7^{7}
2	(Spain) R Nadal	6	6^{5}	6^{5}

Third round
7	(Czech Republic) T Berdych	6	7^{7}
PR	(Croatia) I Karlović	3	6^{2}
(Serbia) J Tipsarević	6	6
(Croatia) I Dodig	1	4

Quarterfinals
7	(Czech Republic) T Berdych	4	4
(Serbia) J Tipsarević	6	6
