= 2009 BNP Paribas Open – Men's singles =

Men's singles
- 2009 BNP Paribas Open

Final
- Champion: (Spain) Rafael Nadal
- Runner-up: (United Kingdom) Andy Murray
- Score: 6–1, 6–2

Details
- Draw: 96
- Seeds: 32

Events
Singles	men	women
Doubles	men	women
- Indian Wells Masters

Rafael Nadal defeated Andy Murray in the final, 6–1, 6–2 to win the men's singles tennis title at the 2009 Indian Wells Masters. Nadal saved five match points en route to the title, in his fourth-round match against David Nalbandian.

Novak Djokovic was the defending champion, but lost in the quarterfinals to Andy Roddick.

== Seeds ==
All seeds receive a bye into the second round.

1. (Spain) Rafael Nadal (champion)
2. (Switzerland) Roger Federer (semifinals)
3. (Serbia) Novak Djokovic (quarterfinals)
4. (United Kingdom) Andy Murray (final)
5. (Russia) ~~Nikolay Davydenko~~ (withdrew due to a left heel injury)
6. (Argentina) Juan Martín del Potro (quarterfinals)
7. (United States) Andy Roddick (semifinals)
8. (France) Gilles Simon (third round)
9. (France) Gaël Monfils (second round)
10. (Spain) Fernando Verdasco (quarterfinals)
11. (France) Jo-Wilfried Tsonga (third round)
12. (Spain) David Ferrer (fourth round)
13. (United States) James Blake (third round)
14. (Argentina) David Nalbandian (fourth round)
15. (Spain) Tommy Robredo (fourth round, retired due to a right wrist injury)
16. (Switzerland) Stanislas Wawrinka (fourth round)
17. (Chile) Fernando González (fourth round)
18. (Czech Republic) Radek Štěpánek (second round)
19. (Croatia) Marin Čilić (third round)
20. (United States) Mardy Fish (second round)
21. (Czech Republic) Tomáš Berdych (second round)
22. (Russia) Igor Andreev (fourth round)
23. (France) Richard Gasquet (third round)
24. (Russia) Marat Safin (third round)
25. (Sweden) Robin Söderling (second round)
26. (Russia) Dmitry Tursunov (third round)
27. (Croatia) Ivo Karlović (third round)
28. (Croatia) Mario Ančić (second round, retired due to illness)
29. (Germany) Rainer Schüttler (second round)
30. (Austria) Jürgen Melzer (third round)
31. (Germany) Nicolas Kiefer (third round)
32. (France) Paul-Henri Mathieu (third round)

== Draw ==
Key

- Q = Qualifier
- WC = Wild card
- LL = Lucky loser
- Alt = Alternate
- ITF = ITF entry
- PR = Protected ranking
- SR = Special ranking
- SE = Special exempt
- JE = Junior exempt
- JR = Junior Accelerator Programme entrant
- CO = College Accelerator Programme entrant
- NG = Next Gen Accelerator Program entrant
- w/o = Walkover
- r = Retired
- d = Defaulted

=== Finals ===
Quarterfinals
1	(Spain) Rafael Nadal	6	6
6	(Argentina) Juan Martín del Potro	2	4
3	(Serbia) Novak Djokovic	3	2
7	(United States) Andy Roddick	6	6
(Croatia) Ivan Ljubičić	5	6^{6}
4	(United Kingdom) Andy Murray	7	7^{8}
10	(Spain) Fernando Verdasco	3	6^{5}
2	(Switzerland) Roger Federer	6	7^{7}

Semifinals
1	(Spain) Rafael Nadal	6	7^{7}
7	(United States) Andy Roddick	4	6^{4}
4	(United Kingdom) Andy Murray	6	4	6
2	(Switzerland) Roger Federer	3	6	1

Final
1	(Spain) Rafael Nadal	6	6
4	(United Kingdom) Andy Murray	1	2

=== Top half ===
==== Section 1 ====
First round
WC	(South Africa) K Anderson	3	3
Q	(Germany) M Berrer	6	6
Q	(United States) M Russell	7	6
(Spain) G García López	5	2
(Russia) M Youzhny	5	1^{r}
(Serbia) V Troicki	7	2
Q	(Germany) B Phau	5	2
Q	(United States) R Kendrick	7	6

Second round
1	(Spain) R Nadal	6	6
Q	(Germany) M Berrer	2	1
Q	(United States) M Russell	6^{5}	6	3
26	(Russia) D Tursunov	7^{7}	4	6
21	(Czech Republic) T Berdych	3	1
(Serbia) V Troicki	6	6
Q	(United States) R Kendrick	4	4
14	(Argentina) D Nalbandian	6	6

Third round
1	(Spain) R Nadal	6	6
26	(Russia) D Tursunov	3	3
(Serbia) V Troicki	4	2
14	(Argentina) D Nalbandian	6	6

Fourth round
1	(Spain) R Nadal	3	7^{7}	6
14	(Argentina) D Nalbandian	6	6^{5}	0

==== Section 2 ====
First round
WC	(United States) J Isner	6	6
(Belgium) C Rochus	1	4
(Chile) N Massú	7^{7}	6^{5}	6
(Argentina) E Schwank	6^{1}	7^{7}	4
WC	(United States) T Dent	6	7^{7}
(Argentina) D Junqueira	1	6^{3}
WC	(United States) W Odesnik	6	4	6^{5}
WC	(United States) R Sweeting	1	6	7^{7}

Second round
9	(France) G Monfils	7^{7}	1	4
WC	(United States) J Isner	6^{5}	6	6
(Chile) N Massú	3	6^{2}
24	(Russia) M Safin	6	7^{7}
30	(Austria) J Melzer	7	6
WC	(United States) T Dent	5	2
WC	(United States) R Sweeting	7^{8}	3	1
6	(Argentina) JM del Potro	6^{6}	6	6

Third round
WC	(United States) J Isner	6	6
24	(Russia) M Safin	4	4
30	(Austria) J Melzer	2	6	6^{2}
6	(Argentina) JM del Potro	6	2	7^{7}

Fourth round
WC	(United States) J Isner	6^{4}	6^{3}
6	(Argentina) JM del Potro	7^{7}	7^{7}

==== Section 3 ====
First round
(Argentina) M Vassallo Argüello	7	7^{7}
Q	(South Africa) R de Voest	5	6^{3}
(Spain) Ó Hernández	3	3
(Germany) T Haas	6	6
(United States) S Querrey	7^{7}	6
(Argentina) G Cañas	6^{2}	2
(Argentina) JI Chela	2	1^{r}
(Italy) A Seppi	6	4

Second round
3	(Serbia) N Djokovic	7	6
(Argentina) M Vassallo Argüello	5	4
(Germany) T Haas	6^{4}	6	6
29	(Germany) R Schüttler	7^{7}	2	4
18	(Czech Republic) R Štěpánek	4	3
(United States) S Querrey	6	6
(Italy) A Seppi	1	3
16	(Switzerland) S Wawrinka	6	6

Third round
3	(Serbia) N Djokovic	6	7^{7}
(Germany) T Haas	2	6^{1}
(United States) S Querrey	6	5	6^{8}
16	(Switzerland) S Wawrinka	2	7	7^{10}

Fourth round
3	(Serbia) N Djokovic	7^{9}	7^{8}
16	(Switzerland) S Wawrinka	6^{7}	6^{6}

==== Section 4 ====
First round
Q	(United States) T Widom	6	7^{7}
(Spain) I Navarro	4	6^{4}
(Romania) V Hănescu	4	6	2
(France) J Chardy	6	3	6
(United States) B Reynolds	4	6	6
(Italy) F Fognini	6	0	2
Q	(Austria) D Köllerer	2	7	6
(Germany) M Zverev	6	5	2

Second round
12	(Spain) D Ferrer	6	7
Q	(United States) T Widom	4	5
(France) J Chardy	7^{7}	7^{7}
20	(United States) M Fish	6^{4}	6^{1}
31	(Germany) N Kiefer	6	6
(United States) B Reynolds	4	2
Q	(Austria) D Köllerer	1	6^{3}
7	(United States) A Roddick	6	7^{7}

Third round
12	(Spain) D Ferrer	3	6	6
(France) J Chardy	6	4	4
31	(Germany) N Kiefer	4	6^{4}
7	(United States) A Roddick	6	7^{7}

Fourth round
12	(Spain) D Ferrer	6^{5}	6	3
7	(United States) A Roddick	7^{7}	3	6

=== Bottom half ===
==== Section 5 ====
First round
(Chinese Taipei) Y-h Lu	7	6
Q	(Switzerland) M Lammer	5	2
(Croatia) I Ljubičić	6	6
(Japan) K Nishikori	3	3
Q	(United States) K Kim	3	4
(Latvia) E Gulbis	6	6
(Russia) T Gabashvili	6	4	6
(Argentina) J Acasuso	2	6	3

Second round
8	(France) G Simon	5	6	6
(Chinese Taipei) Y-h Lu	7	4	4
(Croatia) I Ljubičić	3
28	(Croatia) M Ančić	3^{r}
22	(Russia) I Andreev	6	6
(Latvia) E Gulbis	4	4
(Russia) T Gabashvili	5	3
11	(France) J-W Tsonga	7	6

Third round
8	(France) G Simon	3	6^{3}
(Croatia) I Ljubičić	6	7^{7}
22	(Russia) I Andreev	7	6
11	(France) J-W Tsonga	5	4

Fourth round
(Croatia) I Ljubičić	4	7^{7}	7^{7}
22	(Russia) I Andreev	6	6^{5}	6^{4}

==== Section 6 ====
First round
(United States) V Spadea	3	4
(Russia) I Kunitsyn	6	6
(Belgium) S Darcis	5
(Spain) M Granollers	0^{r}
(Italy) P Starace	7^{8}	6
(Germany) D Gremelmayr	6^{6}	1
(Spain) A Montañés	6	6
(France) F Serra	3	0

Second round
15	(Spain) T Robredo	6	6
(Russia) I Kunitsyn	1	4
(Belgium) S Darcis	7^{7}	2	1
19	(Croatia) M Čilić	6^{4}	6	6
32	(France) P-H Mathieu	6	6^{11}	6
(Italy) P Starace	4	7^{13}	4
(Spain) A Montañés	5	3
4	(United Kingdom) A Murray	7	6

Third round
15	(Spain) T Robredo	7	7^{7}
19	(Croatia) M Čilić	5	6^{2}
32	(France) P-H Mathieu	3	2
4	(United Kingdom) A Murray	6	6

Fourth round
15	(Spain) T Robredo	2	0^{r}
4	(United Kingdom) A Murray	6	3

==== Section 7 ====
First round
(France) J Benneteau	3	2
(Germany) P Kohlschreiber	6	6
(Ecuador) N Lapentti	4	6	7
Q	(Colombia) S Giraldo	6	1	5
(Spain) F López	4	3
(France) M Llodra	6	6
Q	(Brazil) T Bellucci	5	7	6
(Serbia) J Tipsarević	7	5	2

Second round
LL	(France) O Patience	7^{7}	3	3
(Germany) P Kohlschreiber	6^{5}	6	6
(Ecuador) N Lapentti	6	7^{9}
25	(Sweden) R Söderling	4	6^{7}
23	(France) R Gasquet	6	6
(France) M Llodra	4	0
Q	(Brazil) T Bellucci	5	1
10	(Spain) F Verdasco	7	6

Third round
(Germany) P Kohlschreiber	6	3	6
(Ecuador) N Lapentti	2	6	3
23	(France) R Gasquet	3	2
10	(Spain) F Verdasco	6	6

Fourth round
(Germany) P Kohlschreiber	4	6	1
10	(Spain) F Verdasco	6	3	6

==== Section 8 ====
First round
(France) N Devilder	6^{6}	1
(Finland) J Nieminen	7^{8}	6
(Australia) L Hewitt	7^{7}	6
(Czech Republic) J Hernych	6^{3}	3
(Ukraine) S Stakhovsky	2	6	6
Q	(United States) B Evans	6	3	0
(France) M Gicquel	7	6
(Italy) S Bolelli	5	3

Second round
13	(United States) J Blake	6	6^{6}	6
(Finland) J Nieminen	3	7^{8}	3
(Australia) L Hewitt	6	2	3
17	(Chile) F González	4	6	6
27	(Croatia) I Karlović	6	6
(Ukraine) S Stakhovsky	4	2
(France) M Gicquel	6^{4}	4
2	(Switzerland) R Federer	7^{7}	6

Third round
13	(United States) J Blake	5	1
17	(Chile) F González	7	6
27	(Croatia) I Karlović	6^{4}	3
2	(Switzerland) R Federer	7^{7}	6

Fourth round
17	(Chile) F González	3	7	2
2	(Switzerland) R Federer	6	5	6

== Qualifying ==
=== Seeds ===
1. (Brazil) Thomaz Bellucci (qualified)
2. (Germany) Björn Phau (qualified)
3. (Kazakhstan) Evgeny Korolev (first round)
4. (Chile) Paul Capdeville (qualifying competition)
5. (United States) Robert Kendrick (qualified)
6. (United States) Kevin Kim (qualified)
7. (Austria) Daniel Köllerer (qualified)
8. (Germany) Michael Berrer (qualified)
9. (Germany) Simon Greul (first round)
10. (Italy) Flavio Cipolla (qualifying competition)
11. (Brazil) Thiago Alves (first round)
12. (Germany) Benjamin Becker (qualifying competition)
13. (Canada) Jesse Levine (first round)
14. (France) Olivier Patience (qualifying competition, lucky loser)
15. (Colombia) Santiago Giraldo (qualified)
16. (Switzerland) Stéphane Bohli (first round)
17. (United States) Donald Young (first round)
18. (United States) Brendan Evans (qualified)
19. (United States) Sam Warburg (first round)
20. (Belgium) ~~Xavier Malisse~~ (withdrew)
21. (South Africa) Rik de Voest (qualified)
22. (Brazil) Ricardo Mello (qualifying competition)
23. (Poland) Łukasz Kubot (first round)
24. (France) Sébastien de Chaunac (qualifying competition)

=== Qualifiers ===
1. (Brazil) Thomaz Bellucci
2. (Germany) Björn Phau
3. (South Africa) Rik de Voest
4. (United States) Todd Widom
5. (United States) Robert Kendrick
6. (United States) Kevin Kim
7. (Austria) Daniel Köllerer
8. (Germany) Michael Berrer
9. (United States) Michael Russell
10. (Colombia) Santiago Giraldo
11. (United States) Brendan Evans
12. (Switzerland) Michael Lammer

=== Lucky losers ===
1. (France) Olivier Patience

=== Draw ===
Key

- Q = Qualifier
- WC = Wild card
- LL = Lucky loser
- Alt = Alternate
- ITF = ITF entry
- PR = Protected ranking
- SR = Special ranking
- SE = Special exempt
- JE = Junior exempt
- JR = Junior Accelerator Programme entrant
- CO = College Accelerator Programme entrant
- NG = Next Gen Accelerator Program entrant
- w/o = Walkover
- r = Retired
- d = Defaulted

==== First qualifier ====
First round
1	(Brazil) Thomaz Bellucci	6	6
WC	(Moldova) Roman Borvanov	1	0
(Spain) Marc López	6	6
23	(Poland) Łukasz Kubot	4	4

Qualifying competition
1	(Brazil) Thomaz Bellucci	4	6	6
(Spain) Marc López	6	3	4

==== Second qualifier ====
First round
2	(Germany) Björn Phau	6	6
(United States) John Paul Fruttero	4	1
(Serbia) Dušan Vemić	1	5
24	(France) Sébastien de Chaunac	6	7

Qualifying competition
2	(Germany) Björn Phau	6	6
24	(France) Sébastien de Chaunac	2	4

==== Third qualifier ====
First round
3	(Kazakhstan) Evgeny Korolev	6^{3}	6	2
(United States) Nicholas Monroe	7^{7}	1	6
(Armenia) Tigran Martirosyan	0	4
21	(South Africa) Rik de Voest	6	6

Qualifying competition
(United States) Nicholas Monroe	3	4
21	(South Africa) Rik de Voest	6	6

==== Fourth qualifier ====
First round
4	(Chile) Paul Capdeville	4	6	6
WC	(United States) Jesse Witten	6	2	4
(United States) Todd Widom	6	6
Alt	(United States) Stephen Bass	3	4

Qualifying competition
4	(Chile) Paul Capdeville	2	6	3
(United States) Todd Widom	6	3	6

==== Fifth qualifier ====
First round
5	(United States) Robert Kendrick	6	6
WC	(United States) Alexander Domijan	2	2
(South Korea) Daniel Yoo	4	4
22	(Brazil) Ricardo Mello	6	6

Qualifying competition
5	(United States) Robert Kendrick	6	6
22	(Brazil) Ricardo Mello	4	4

==== Sixth qualifier ====
First round
6	(United States) Kevin Kim	6	6
(Serbia) Vladimir Obradović	4	2
(United States) Scoville Jenkins	6	6
19	(United States) Sam Warburg	2	3

Qualifying competition
6	(United States) Kevin Kim	6^{4}	6	6
(United States) Scoville Jenkins	7^{7}	2	1

==== Seventh qualifier ====
First round
7	(Austria) Daniel Köllerer	6	6
(Switzerland) George Bastl	4	2
(Switzerland) Marco Chiudinelli	7^{7}	6
13	(Canada) Jesse Levine	6^{4}	1

Qualifying competition
7	(Austria) Daniel Köllerer	6	6
(Switzerland) Marco Chiudinelli	4	2

==== Eighth qualifier ====
First round
8	(Germany) Michael Berrer	6^{3}	6	6
(United States) Rajeev Ram	7^{7}	2	4
(United States) Greg Ouellette	6^{7}	4
14	(France) Olivier Patience	7^{9}	6

Qualifying competition
8	(Germany) Michael Berrer	6	7
14	(France) Olivier Patience	4	5

==== Ninth qualifier ====
First round
9	(Germany) Simon Greul	6	2	1
(Argentina) Nicolás Todero	3	6	6
(United States) Michael Russell	6	6
16	(Switzerland) Stéphane Bohli	1	2

Qualifying competition
(Argentina) Nicolás Todero	3	1
(United States) Michael Russell	6	6

==== Tenth qualifier ====
First round
10	(Italy) Flavio Cipolla	6^{5}	7^{7}	7
(United States) Lester Cook	7^{7}	6^{3}	5
Alt	(Germany) Tobias Summerer	0	1
15	(Colombia) Santiago Giraldo	6	6

Qualifying competition
10	(Italy) Flavio Cipolla	3	1
15	(Colombia) Santiago Giraldo	6	6

==== Eleventh qualifier ====
First round
11	(Brazil) Thiago Alves	2	0
WC	(Germany) Tobias Clemens	6	6
WC	(United States) Colt Gaston	3	4
18	(United States) Brendan Evans	6	6

Qualifying competition
WC	(Germany) Tobias Clemens	7	4	6^{2}
18	(United States) Brendan Evans	5	6	7^{7}

==== Twelfth qualifier ====
First round
12	(Germany) Benjamin Becker	6	7
(Czech Republic) Lukáš Dlouhý	4	5
(Switzerland) Michael Lammer	2	6	7
17	(United States) Donald Young	6	4	5

Qualifying competition
12	(Germany) Benjamin Becker	6	6^{4}	3
(Switzerland) Michael Lammer	3	7^{7}	6
