= 2011 Rogers Cup – Women's singles =

Women's singles
- 2011 Rogers Cup

Final
- Champion: (United States) Serena Williams
- Runner-up: (Australia) Samantha Stosur
- Score: 6–4, 6–2

Details
- Draw: 56
- Seeds: 16

Events
Singles	men	women
Doubles	men	women
← 2010 ·	Rogers Cup	· 2012 →

Serena Williams defeated Samantha Stosur in the final, 6–4, 6–2 to win the women's singles tennis title at the 2011 Canadian Open. It was her second Canadian Open title.

Caroline Wozniacki was the defending champion, but lost to Roberta Vinci in the second round.

== Seeds ==
The top eight seeds receive a bye into the second round.

1. (Denmark) Caroline Wozniacki (second round)
2. (Belgium) Kim Clijsters (second round, retired because of an abdominal injury)
3. (Russia) Vera Zvonareva (third round)
4. (Belarus) Victoria Azarenka (semifinals)
5. (Russia) Maria Sharapova (third round)
6. (China) Li Na (third round)
7. (Czech Republic) Petra Kvitová (third round)
8. (Italy) Francesca Schiavone (third round)
9. (France) Marion Bartoli (first round)
10. (Australia) Samantha Stosur (final)
11. (Germany) Andrea Petkovic (quarterfinals)
12. (Russia) Svetlana Kuznetsova (first round)
13. (Poland) Agnieszka Radwańska (semifinals)
14. (Russia) Anastasia Pavlyuchenkova (first round)
15. (Serbia) Jelena Janković (first round)
16. (Slovakia) Dominika Cibulková (first round, retired because of a left abdominal strain)

== Main draw ==
=== Key ===
- Q = Qualifier
- WC = Wild card
- LL = Lucky loser
- Alt = Alternate
- ITF = ITF entry
- PR = Protected ranking
- SR = Special ranking
- SE = Special exempt
- JE = Junior exempt
- JR = Junior Accelerator Programme entrant
- CO = College Accelerator Programme entrant
- NG = Next Gen Accelerator Program entrant
- w/o = Walkover
- r = Retired
- d = Defaulted

=== Finals ===
Quarterfinals
(Italy) Roberta Vinci	4	1
10	(Australia) Samantha Stosur	6	6
13	(Poland) Agnieszka Radwańska	6	6
11	(Germany) Andrea Petkovic	4	3
Q	(Kazakhstan) Galina Voskoboeva	1	2
4	(Belarus) Victoria Azarenka	6	6
(Czech Republic) Lucie Šafářová	6	3	2
(United States) Serena Williams	4	6	6

Semifinals
10	(Australia) Samantha Stosur	6	5	6
13	(Poland) Agnieszka Radwańska	2	7	2
4	(Belarus) Victoria Azarenka	3	3
(United States) Serena Williams	6	6

Final
10	(Australia) Samantha Stosur	4	2
(United States) Serena Williams	6	6

=== Top half ===
==== Section 1 ====
First round
(Belgium) Y Wickmayer	4	2
(Italy) R Vinci	6	6
Q	(China) S Zhang	1	1
(Serbia) A Ivanovic	6	6
Q	(Czech Republic) I Benešová	7	4	1
16	(Slovakia) D Cibulková	5	6	3^{r}
10	(Australia) S Stosur	4	6	6
(Japan) A Morita	6	2	3
WC	(Canada) A Wozniak	6	6
(Israel) S Pe'er	1	0
(China) S Peng	6	7
LL	(Spain) L Domínguez Lino	1	5

Second round
1	(Denmark) C Wozniacki	4	5
(Italy) R Vinci	6	7
(Serbia) A Ivanovic	6	6
Q	(Czech Republic) I Benešová	3	2
10	(Australia) S Stosur	6	6
WC	(Canada) A Wozniak	3	4
(China) S Peng
6	(China) N Li	w/o

Third round
(Italy) R Vinci	7^{7}	6
(Serbia) A Ivanovic	6^{3}	2
10	(Australia) S Stosur	6	6
6	(China) N Li	2	4

Quarterfinals
(Italy) R Vinci	4	1
10	(Australia) S Stosur	6	6

==== Section 2 ====
First round
(Australia) J Gajdošová	1	2
(Russia) N Petrova	6	6
Q	(Croatia) P Martić	1	6	6
(Czech Republic) L Hradecká	6	4	4
(Russia) E Vesnina	4	1
13	(Poland) A Radwańska	6	6
11	(Germany) A Petkovic	6	6
WC	(Canada) E Bouchard	2	2
(Czech Republic) K Zakopalová	3	1
Q	(Hungary) G Arn	6	6
(Spain) A Medina Garrigues	7	6
(Italy) S Errani	5	1

Second round
3	(Russia) V Zvonareva	7	6
(Russia) N Petrova	5	4
Q	(Croatia) P Martić	3	3
13	(Poland) A Radwańska	6	6
11	(Germany) A Petkovic	6	7
Q	(Hungary) G Arn	4	5
(Spain) A Medina Garrigues	6^{3}	3
7	(Czech Republic) P Kvitová	7^{7}	6

Third round
3	(Russia) V Zvonareva	4	6^{4}
13	(Poland) A Radwańska	6	7^{7}
11	(Germany) A Petkovic	6	6
7	(Czech Republic) P Kvitová	1	2

Quarterfinals
13	(Poland) A Radwańska	6	6
11	(Germany) A Petkovic	4	3

=== Bottom half ===
==== Section 3 ====
First round
Q	(Serbia) B Jovanovski	2
(Australia) J Dokić	0	r
(Italy) F Pennetta	6	6
(Russia) M Kirilenko	3	1
Q	(Kazakhstan) G Voskoboeva	6	6
9	(France) M Bartoli	3	3
14	(Russia) A Pavlyuchenkova	6	4	1
Q	(Spain) MJ Martínez Sánchez	3	6	6
(Slovakia) D Hantuchová	6	6
(Argentina) G Dulko	3	4
WC	(Canada) S Dubois	7^{7}	6
Q	(Germany) K Wörle	6^{4}	1

Second round
5	(Russia) M Sharapova	6	7
Q	(Serbia) B Jovanovski	1	5
(Italy) F Pennetta	6	3	2
Q	(Kazakhstan) G Voskoboeva	2	6	6
Q	(Spain) MJ Martínez Sánchez	7	6
(Slovakia) D Hantuchová	5	2
WC	(Canada) S Dubois	0	0
4	(Belarus) V Azarenka	6	6

Third round
5	(Russia) M Sharapova	3	5
Q	(Kazakhstan) G Voskoboeva	6	7
Q	(Spain) MJ Martínez Sánchez	1	2
4	(Belarus) V Azarenka	6	6

Quarterfinals
Q	(Kazakhstan) G Voskoboeva	1	2
4	(Belarus) V Azarenka	6	6

==== Section 4 ====
First round
(Russia) E Makarova	7^{8}	6
(Canada) R Marino	6^{6}	4
(Czech Republic) L Šafářová	6	4	6
Q	(Slovenia) P Hercog	3	6	3
Q	(Romania) S Halep	4	6	6
12	(Russia) S Kuznetsova	6	4	3
15	(Serbia) J Janković	1	3
(Germany) J Görges	6	6
PR	(Ukraine) A Bondarenko	0	3
(United States) S Williams	6	6
Q	(Italy) A Brianti	2	1
Q	(China) J Zheng	6	6

Second round
8	(Italy) F Schiavone	6	6
(Russia) E Makarova	1	3
(Czech Republic) L Šafářová	6	6
Q	(Romania) S Halep	2	4
(Germany) J Görges	1	6^{7}
(United States) S Williams	6	7^{9}
Q	(China) J Zheng	3	2
2	(Belgium) K Clijsters	6	1^{r}

Third round
8	(Italy) F Schiavone	3	3
(Czech Republic) L Šafářová	6	6
(United States) S Williams	4	6	6
Q	(China) J Zheng	6	3	3

Quarterfinals
(Czech Republic) L Šafářová	6	3	2
(United States) S Williams	4	6	6
