= 2011 Rogers Cup – Women's doubles =

Women's doubles
- 2011 Rogers Cup

Final
- Champions: (United States) Liezel Huber; (United States) Lisa Raymond
- Runners-up: (Belarus) Victoria Azarenka; (Russia) Maria Kirilenko
- Score: walkover

Details
- Draw: 28
- Seeds: 8

Events
Singles	men	women
Doubles	men	women
- Rogers Cup

Gisela Dulko and Flavia Pennetta were the defending champions, but were knocked out in the semifinals by Liezel Huber and Lisa Raymond.

Huber and Raymond won the title because their opponents Victoria Azarenka and Maria Kirilenko withdrew before the final match (due to Azarenka's right hand injury).

== Seeds ==
The top four seeds received a bye into the second round.

1. (Czech Republic) Květa Peschke / (Slovenia) Katarina Srebotnik (second round)
2. (Argentina) Gisela Dulko / (Italy) Flavia Pennetta (semifinals)
3. (United States) Liezel Huber / (United States) Lisa Raymond (champions)
4. (Belarus) Victoria Azarenka / (Russia) Maria Kirilenko (final, withdrew due to Azarenka's right hand injury)
5. (India) Sania Mirza / (Russia) Elena Vesnina (first round)
6. (China) Peng Shuai / (China) Zheng Jie (withdrew due to Peng's hip injury)
7. (Czech Republic) Iveta Benešová / (Czech Republic) Barbora Záhlavová-Strýcová (first round)
8. (Chinese Taipei) Chan Yung-Jan / (Australia) Anastasia Rodionova (first round)

== Draw ==
Key

- Q = Qualifier
- WC = Wild card
- LL = Lucky loser
- Alt = Alternate
- ITF = ITF entry
- PR = Protected ranking
- SR = Special ranking
- SE = Special exempt
- JE = Junior exempt
- JR = Junior Accelerator Programme entrant
- CO = College Accelerator Programme entrant
- NG = Next Gen Accelerator Program entrant
- w/o = Walkover
- r = Retired
- d = Defaulted

=== Finals ===
Semifinals

Final

- (Spain) Nuria Llagostera Vives
- (Spain) Arantxa Parra Santonja
4
3

4
- (Belarus) Victoria Azarenka
- (Russia) Maria Kirilenko
6
6

4
- (Belarus) Victoria Azarenka
- (Russia) Maria Kirilenko

3
- (United States) Liezel Huber
- (United States) Lisa Raymond
w/o

3
- (United States) Liezel Huber
- (United States) Lisa Raymond
3
6
[10]

2
- (Argentina) Gisela Dulko
- (Italy) Flavia Pennetta
6
1
[6]

=== Top half ===
First round

Second round

Quarterfinals

Semifinals

1
- (Czech Republic) K Peschke
- (Slovenia) K Srebotnik
6
4
[12]

- (Greece) E Daniilidou
- (Slovenia) P Hercog
6
2
[4]

- (Spain) N Llagostera Vives
- (Spain) A Parra Santonja
3
6
[14]

- (Spain) N Llagostera Vives
- (Spain) A Parra Santonja
2
6
[10]

- (Spain) N Llagostera Vives
- (Spain) A Parra Santonja
4
6
[10]

- (Spain) M J Martínez Sánchez
- (Spain) A Medina Garrigues
3
6
[5]

- (Chinese Taipei) S-W Hsieh
- (Kazakhstan) G Voskoboeva
6
4
[6]

- (Chinese Taipei) S-W Hsieh
- (Kazakhstan) G Voskoboeva
6
4
[10]

- (Chinese Taipei) S-W Hsieh
- (Kazakhstan) G Voskoboeva
6
6^{4}
[10]

- (United States) R Kops-Jones
- (United States) A Spears
3
7
[10]

- (United States) R Kops-Jones
- (United States) A Spears
4
7^{7}
[5]

7
(Czech Republic) I Benešová
(Czech Republic) B Záhlavová-Strýcová
6
5
[7]

- (Spain) N Llagostera Vives
- (Spain) A Parra Santonja
4
3

4
- (Belarus) V Azarenka
- (Russia) M Kirilenko
6
6

4
- (Belarus) V Azarenka
- (Russia) M Kirilenko
4

- (Australia) J Gajdošová
- (Russia) N Petrova
6
6^{7}
[6]

WC
- (Serbia) A Ivanovic
- (Germany) A Petkovic
1
r

WC
- (Serbia) A Ivanovic
- (Germany) A Petkovic
1
7^{9}
[10]

4
- (Belarus) V Azarenka
- (Russia) M Kirilenko
6
6

- (South Africa) N Grandin
- (Czech Republic) V Uhlířová
7^{11}
6

- (South Africa) N Grandin
- (Czech Republic) V Uhlířová
3
3

WC
- (Canada) R Marino
- (China) S Sun
6^{9}
3

- (South Africa) N Grandin
- (Czech Republic) V Uhlířová
7^{8}
3
[10]

- (Italy) S Errani
- (Italy) R Vinci
2
6
[10]

- (Italy) S Errani
- (Italy) R Vinci
6^{6}
6
[2]

5
- (India) S Mirza
- (Russia) E Vesnina
6
0
[7]

=== Bottom half ===
First round

Second round

Quarterfinals

Semifinals

8
- (Chinese Taipei) Y-J Chan
- (Australia) A Rodionova
5
3

- (Japan) K Date-Krumm
- (China) S Zhang
7
6

- (Japan) K Date-Krumm
- (China) S Zhang
5
6^{4}

- (Italy) A Brianti
- (Poland) U Radwańska
3
3

- (Russia) V Dushevina
- (Czech Republic) L Hradecká
7
7^{7}

- (Russia) V Dushevina
- (Czech Republic) L Hradecká
6
6

- (Russia) V Dushevina
- (Czech Republic) L Hradecká

- (Russia) A Kudryavtseva
- (Czech Republic) K Zakopalová
6
2
[6]

3
- (United States) L Huber
- (United States) L Raymond
w/o

- (Romania) M Niculescu
- (Israel) S Pe'er
3
6
[10]

- (Romania) M Niculescu
- (Israel) S Pe'er
3
4

3
- (United States) L Huber
- (United States) L Raymond
6
6

3
- (United States) L Huber
- (United States) L Raymond
3
6
[10]

Alt
- (Russia) M Kondratieva
- (France) S Lefèvre
3
5

2
- (Argentina) G Dulko
- (Italy) F Pennetta
6
1
[6]

- (Chinese Taipei) C-J Chuang
- (Belarus) O Govortsova
6
7

- (Chinese Taipei) C-J Chuang
- (Belarus) O Govortsova
6
4
[10]

- (Poland) K Jans-Ignacik
- (Poland) A Rosolska
7
7

- (Poland) K Jans-Ignacik
- (Poland) A Rosolska
2
6
[12]

WC
- (Canada) S Fichman
- (Canada) M-È Pelletier
5
5

- (Poland) K Jans-Ignacik
- (Poland) A Rosolska
2
4

- (New Zealand) M Erakovic
- (Germany) J Görges
2
7
[10]

2
- (Argentina) G Dulko
- (Italy) F Pennetta
6
6

WC
- (Russia) S Kuznetsova
- (Russia) A Pavlyuchenkova
6
5
[6]

- (New Zealand) M Erakovic
- (Germany) J Görges
6
2
[6]

2
- (Argentina) G Dulko
- (Italy) F Pennetta
4
6
[10]
