= 2009 BNP Paribas Open – Women's singles =

Women's singles
- 2009 BNP Paribas Open

Final
- Champion: (Russia) Vera Zvonareva
- Runner-up: (Serbia) Ana Ivanovic
- Score: 7–6^{(7–5)}, 6–2

Details
- Draw: 96
- Seeds: 32

Events
Singles	men	women
Doubles	men	women
← 2008 ·	BNP Paribas Open	· 2010 →

Vera Zvonareva defeated the defending champion Ana Ivanovic in the final, 7–6^{(7–5)}, 6–2 to win the women's singles tennis title at the 2009 Indian Wells Masters. The match was a rematch of the previous year's quarterfinal.

== Seeds ==
All seeds received a bye into the second round.

1. (Russia) Dinara Safina (quarterfinals)
2. (Serbia) Jelena Janković (second round)
3. (Russia) Elena Dementieva (second round)
4. (Russia) Vera Zvonareva (champion)
5. (Serbia) Ana Ivanovic (final)
6. (Russia) Svetlana Kuznetsova (second round)
7. (Poland) Agnieszka Radwańska (quarterfinals)
8. (Belarus) Victoria Azarenka (semifinals)
9. (Denmark) Caroline Wozniacki (quarterfinals)
10. (France) Marion Bartoli (second round)
11. (France) Alizé Cornet (second round)
12. (Italy) Flavia Pennetta (fourth round)
13. (Switzerland) Patty Schnyder (second round)
14. (Slovakia) Dominika Cibulková (second round)
15. (China) Zheng Jie (second round)
16. (Spain) Anabel Medina Garrigues (second round)
17. (France) Amélie Mauresmo (third round)
18. (Estonia) Kaia Kanepi (third round)
19. (Russia) Anna Chakvetadze (third round)
20. (Japan) Ai Sugiyama (second round)
21. (Russia) Alisa Kleybanova (third round)
22. (Hungary) Ágnes Szávay (fourth round)
23. (Austria) Sybille Bammer (quarterfinals, withdrew due to a shoulder injury)
24. (Ukraine) Alona Bondarenko (second round)
25. (Canada) Aleksandra Wozniak (third round)
26. (Czech Republic) Iveta Benešová (second round)
27. (Italy) Sara Errani (second round, retired)
28. (China) Peng Shuai (third round)
29. (Spain) Carla Suárez Navarro (second round)
30. (Slovakia) Daniela Hantuchová (fourth round)
31. (Argentina) Gisela Dulko (third round)
32. (Romania) Sorana Cîrstea (second round)

== Draw ==
=== Key ===
- Q = Qualifier
- WC = Wild card
- LL = Lucky loser
- Alt = Alternate
- SE = Special exempt
- PR = Protected ranking
- ITF = ITF entry
- JE = Junior exempt
- w/o = Walkover
- r = Retired
- d = Defaulted
- SR = Special ranking

=== Finals ===
Quarterfinals
1	(Russia) Dinara Safina	7^{7}	1	3
8	(Belarus) Victoria Azarenka	6^{4}	6	6
4	(Russia) Vera Zvonareva	6	6
9	(Denmark) Caroline Wozniacki	4	2
5	(Serbia) Ana Ivanovic	w/o
23	(Austria) Sybille Bammer
7	(Poland) Agnieszka Radwańska	6^{8}	4
(Russia) Anastasia Pavlyuchenkova	7^{10}	6

Semifinals
8	(Belarus) Victoria Azarenka	3	3
4	(Russia) Vera Zvonareva	6	6
5	(Serbia) Ana Ivanovic	6	6
(Russia) Anastasia Pavlyuchenkova	2	3

Final
4	(Russia) Vera Zvonareva	7^{7}	6
5	(Serbia) Ana Ivanovic	6^{5}	2

=== Top half ===
==== Section 1 ====
First round
(Bulgaria) T Pironkova	6	6
(New Zealand) M Erakovic	4	1
(United Kingdom) A Keothavong	6	3	1
(Belarus) O Govortsova	2	6	6
(Czech Republic) N Vaidišová	6	6
WC	(Netherlands) M Krajicek	3	4
WC	(Australia) J Dokić	4	2
(United States) J Craybas	6	6

Second round
1	(Russia) D Safina	7	6
(Bulgaria) T Pironkova	6^{8}	2
(Belarus) O Govortsova	3	6	4
28	(China) S Peng	6	3	6
24	(Ukraine) A Bondarenko	3	1
(Czech Republic) N Vaidišová	6	6
(United States) J Craybas	7	3	6
16	(Spain) A Medina Garrigues	5	6	4

Third round
1	(Russia) D Safina	7	6
28	(China) S Peng	5	4
(Czech Republic) N Vaidišová	4	3
(United States) J Craybas	6	6

Fourth round
1	(Russia) D Safina	7	6
(United States) J Craybas	5	4

==== Section 2 ====
First round
(Ukraine) K Bondarenko	2	1
(Israel) S Pe'er	6	6
(Russia) E Makarova	3	6	6
(France) N Dechy	6	1	3
(Germany) S Lisicki	6^{4}	5
(Russia) E Vesnina	7	7
(Russia) A Kudryavtseva	4	2
Q	(Kazakhstan) Y Shvedova	6	6

Second round
10	(France) M Bartoli	6	4	5
(Israel) S Pe'er	1	6	7
(Russia) E Makarova	3	5
19	(Russia) A Chakvetadze	6	7
32	(Romania) S Cîrstea	7	2	3
(Russia) E Vesnina	5	6	6
Q	(Kazakhstan) Y Shvedova	6	5	3
8	(Belarus) V Azarenka	4	7	6

Third round
(Israel) S Pe'er	6	6
19	(Russia) A Chakvetadze	2	4
(Russia) E Vesnina	3	5
8	(Belarus) V Azarenka	6	7

Fourth round
(Israel) S Pe'er	5	4
8	(Belarus) V Azarenka	7	6

==== Section 3 ====
First round
Q	(Spain) V Ruano Pascual	4	1
(Chinese Taipei) Y-j Chan	6	6
(Czech Republic) P Kvitová	6	6
(France) P Parmentier	3	2
(Romania) M Niculescu	3	0
(Germany) A-L Grönefeld	6	6
(China) N Li	6	6
(Thailand) T Tanasugarn	4	4

Second round
4	(Russia) V Zvonareva	6	6
(Chinese Taipei) Y-j Chan	2	2
(Czech Republic) P Kvitová	6	6
26	(Czech Republic) I Benešová	3	1
17	(France) A Mauresmo	5	6	6
(Germany) A-L Grönefeld	7	3	4
(China) N Li	7	6
13	(Switzerland) P Schnyder	5	2

Third round
4	(Russia) V Zvonareva	6	6
(Czech Republic) P Kvitová	3	1
17	(France) A Mauresmo	5	2
(China) N Li	7	6

Fourth round
4	(Russia) V Zvonareva	6	6
(China) N Li	4	4

==== Section 4 ====
First round
(Sweden) S Arvidsson	2	3
(Switzerland) T Bacsinszky	6	6
(France) V Razzano	6	6
Q	(Russia) E Rodina	3	4
Q	(Canada) S Dubois	3	2
WC	(United States) A Glatch	6	6
Q	(Portugal) M Larcher de Brito	6	2	4
WC	(Poland) U Radwańska	4	6	6

Second round
9	(Denmark) C Wozniacki	6	6
(Switzerland) T Bacsinszky	1	1
(France) V Razzano	6^{2}	0	r
18	(Estonia) K Kanepi	7	1
29	(Spain) C Suárez Navarro	3	1
WC	(United States) A Glatch	6	6
WC	(Poland) U Radwańska	6	4	6
6	(Russia) S Kuznetsova	2	6	3

Third round
9	(Denmark) C Wozniacki	6	3	6
18	(Estonia) K Kanepi	3	6	3
WC	(United States) A Glatch	3	6^{3}
WC	(Poland) U Radwańska	6	7

Fourth round
9	(Denmark) C Wozniacki	7	6
WC	(Poland) U Radwańska	5	3

=== Bottom half ===
==== Section 5 ====
First round
Q	(Belarus) A Yakimova	6	6
Q	(United States) V Lepchenko	4	1
(United States) B Mattek-Sands	6	6
(Italy) T Garbin	4	4
WC	(Croatia) A Tomljanović	5	2
Q	(United States) A Haynes	7	6
(Ukraine) M Koryttseva	6	3	2
WC	(India) S Mirza	2	6	6

Second round
5	(Serbia) A Ivanovic	6	6
Q	(Belarus) A Yakimova	4	3
(United States) B Mattek-Sands	1	3
31	(Argentina) G Dulko	6	6
20	(Japan) A Sugiyama	4	5
Q	(United States) A Haynes	6	7
WC	(India) S Mirza	3	4
12	(Italy) F Pennetta	6	6

Third round
5	(Serbia) A Ivanovic	6	6
31	(Argentina) G Dulko	3	3
Q	(United States) A Haynes	6	4	1
12	(Italy) F Pennetta	4	6	6

Fourth round
5	(Serbia) A Ivanovic	6	4	6
12	(Italy) F Pennetta	4	6	4

==== Section 6 ====
First round
Q	(Croatia) P Martić	4	3
(Russia) V Dushevina	6	6
(Japan) A Morita	3	4
(Italy) R Vinci	6	6
(Slovakia) M Rybáriková	3	2
(Belgium) Y Wickmayer	6	6
Q	(France) S Foretz	2	5
Q	(Czech Republic) P Cetkovská	6	7

Second round
15	(China) J Zheng	2	2
(Russia) V Dushevina	6	6
(Italy) R Vinci	2	3
23	(Austria) S Bammer	6	6
30	(Slovakia) D Hantuchová	5	6	7
(Belgium) Y Wickmayer	7	3	6^{4}
Q	(Czech Republic) P Cetkovská	7	2	6
3	(Russia) E Dementieva	6^{2}	6	1

Third round
(Russia) V Dushevina	1	3
23	(Austria) S Bammer	6	6
30	(Slovakia) D Hantuchová	7	7
Q	(Czech Republic) P Cetkovská	5	5

Fourth round
23	(Austria) S Bammer	6	6
30	(Slovakia) D Hantuchová	3	2

==== Section 7 ====
First round
(Australia) S Stosur	6	6
(Italy) F Schiavone	1	4
(Czech Republic) L Šafářová	6	6
WC	(United States) M Oudin	3	1
(Russia) M Kirilenko	6	5	5
(Romania) E Gallovits	3	7	7
(Czech Republic) K Zakopalová	1	2
Q	(Germany) K Barrois	6	6

Second round
7	(Poland) A Radwańska	3	6	7
(Australia) S Stosur	6	3	5
(Czech Republic) L Šafářová	3	3
25	(Canada) A Wozniak	6	6
22	(Hungary) Á Szávay	6	6
(Romania) E Gallovits	2	2
Q	(Germany) K Barrois	6	6
11	(France) A Cornet	2	2

Third round
7	(Poland) A Radwańska	6	6
25	(Canada) A Wozniak	1	4
22	(Hungary) Á Szávay	6	6
Q	(Germany) K Barrois	3	4

Fourth round
7	(Poland) A Radwańska	6	5	6
22	(Hungary) Á Szávay	0	7	3

==== Section 8 ====
First round
(Spain) N Llagostera Vives	7	7
(Czech Republic) B Záhlavová-Strýcová	6^{5}	6^{9}
(Austria) T Paszek	6	6
(Italy) M Santangelo	3	2
WC	(United States) V King	2	1
(Italy) K Knapp	6	6
(Poland) M Domachowska	1	3
(Russia) A Pavlyuchenkova	6	6

Second round
14	(Slovakia) D Cibulková	6^{6}	0
(Spain) N Llagostera Vives	7	6
(Austria) T Paszek	3	2
21	(Russia) A Kleybanova	6	6
27	(Italy) S Errani	2	2	r
(Italy) K Knapp	6	3
(Russia) A Pavlyuchenkova	6	6
2	(Serbia) J Janković	4	4

Third round
(Spain) N Llagostera Vives	7	6
21	(Russia) A Kleybanova	6^{2}	3
(Italy) K Knapp	2	4
(Russia) A Pavlyuchenkova	6	6

Fourth round
(Spain) N Llagostera Vives	3	0	r
(Russia) A Pavlyuchenkova	6	3
