= 2009 BNP Paribas Open – Women's doubles =

Women's doubles
- 2009 BNP Paribas Open

Final
- Champions: (Belarus) Victoria Azarenka (Russia) Vera Zvonareva
- Runners-up: (Argentina) Gisela Dulko (Israel) Shahar Pe'er
- Score: 6–4, 3–6, 10–5

Events
Singles	men	women
Doubles	men	women
- BNP Paribas Open

Dinara Safina and Elena Vesnina were the defending champions, but Safina chose not to participate, and only Vesnina competed that year.
Vesnina partnered with Maria Sharapova, but lost in the first round to Ekaterina Makarova and Tatiana Poutchek.

== Seeds ==
1. (Zimbabwe) Cara Black / (United States) Liezel Huber (second round)
2. (Spain) Anabel Medina Garrigues / (Spain) Virginia Ruano Pascual (first round)
3. (Czech Republic) Květa Peschke / (United States) Lisa Raymond (first round)
4. (Australia) Samantha Stosur / (Australia) Rennae Stubbs (second round)
5. (Slovakia) Daniela Hantuchová / (Japan) Ai Sugiyama (first round)
6. (Spain) Nuria Llagostera Vives / (Spain) María José Martínez Sánchez (semifinals)
7. (Russia) Maria Kirilenko / (Italy) Flavia Pennetta (semifinals)
8. (Chinese Taipei) Chan Yung-jan / (China) Sun Tiantian (first round)

== Draw ==
Key

- Q = Qualifier
- WC = Wild card
- LL = Lucky loser
- Alt = Alternate
- ITF = ITF entry
- PR = Protected ranking
- SR = Special ranking
- SE = Special exempt
- JE = Junior exempt
- JR = Junior Accelerator Programme entrant
- CO = College Accelerator Programme entrant
- NG = Next Gen Accelerator Program entrant
- w/o = Walkover
- r = Retired
- d = Defaulted

=== Finals ===
Semifinals
7	(Russia) Maria Kirilenko (Italy) Flavia Pennetta	6^{5}	1
(Belarus) Victoria Azarenka (Russia) Vera Zvonareva	7	6
(Argentina) Gisela Dulko (Israel) Shahar Pe'er	6	6
6	(Spain) Nuria Llagostera Vives (Spain) María José Martínez Sánchez	3	3

Final
(Belarus) Victoria Azarenka (Russia) Vera Zvonareva	6	3	[10]
(Argentina) Gisela Dulko (Israel) Shahar Pe'er	4	6	[5]

=== Top half ===
First round
1	(Zimbabwe) C Black (United States) L Huber	6	6
(United States) J Craybas (Thailand) T Tanasugarn	2	3
(Russia) A Kleybanova (Romania) M Niculescu	6^{5}	6	[12]
(Italy) F Schiavone (Denmark) C Wozniacki	7	4	[10]
(China) Z Yan (China) J Zheng	6	2	[10]
(Russia) V Dushevina (Kazakhstan) Y Shvedova	4	6	[3]
(Germany) A-L Grönefeld (Switzerland) P Schnyder	2	2
7	(Russia) M Kirilenko (Italy) F Pennetta	6	6
4	(Australia) S Stosur (Australia) R Stubbs	7	6
(Poland) K Jans (Poland) A Rosolska	6^{6}	1
(Uzbekistan) A Amanmuradova (United States) V King	1	2
(Belarus) V Azarenka (Russia) V Zvonareva	6	6
(Czech Republic) L Hradecká (Czech Republic) V Uhlířová	3	0
(Ukraine) A Bondarenko (Ukraine) K Bondarenko	6	6
(Russia) A Kudryavtseva (Russia) A Rodionova	6	4	[16]
5	(Slovakia) D Hantuchová (Japan) A Sugiyama	4	6	[14]

Second round
1	(Zimbabwe) C Black (United States) L Huber	5	6^{6}
(Russia) A Kleybanova (Romania) M Niculescu	7	7
(China) Z Yan (China) J Zheng	7	4	[6]
7	(Russia) M Kirilenko (Italy) F Pennetta	6^{2}	6	[10]
4	(Australia) S Stosur (Australia) R Stubbs	2	6	[7]
(Belarus) V Azarenka (Russia) V Zvonareva	6	3	[10]
(Ukraine) A Bondarenko (Ukraine) K Bondarenko	4	6	[4]
(Russia) A Kudryavtseva (Russia) A Rodionova	6	4	[10]

Quarterfinals
(Russia) A Kleybanova (Romania) M Niculescu	2	2
7	(Russia) M Kirilenko (Italy) F Pennetta	6	6
(Belarus) V Azarenka (Russia) V Zvonareva	6	6
(Russia) A Kudryavtseva (Russia) A Rodionova	0	2

Semifinals
7	(Russia) M Kirilenko (Italy) F Pennetta	6^{5}	1
(Belarus) V Azarenka (Russia) V Zvonareva	7	6

=== Bottom half ===
First round
8	(Chinese Taipei) Y-j Chan (China) T Sun	2	6	[7]
(Czech Republic) I Benešová (Czech Republic) B Záhlavová-Strýcová	6	4	[10]
(United States) R Kops-Jones (United States) A Spears	6	3	[10]
(France) N Dechy (Italy) M Santangelo	4	6	[5]
(Argentina) G Dulko (Israel) S Pe'er	6	6
(Chinese Taipei) C-j Chuang (India) S Mirza	1	4
(Chinese Taipei) S-w Hsieh (China) S Peng	2	7	[13]
3	(Czech Republic) K Peschke (United States) L Raymond	6	6^{3}	[11]
6	(Spain) N Llagostera Vives (Spain) MJ Martínez Sánchez	3	6	[10]
(Poland) A Radwańska (Hungary) Á Szávay	6	4	[2]
WC	(Russia) M Sharapova (Russia) E Vesnina	1	6	[7]
(Russia) E Makarova (Belarus) T Poutchek	6	4	[10]
(Romania) S Cîrstea (Kazakhstan) G Voskoboeva	2	2
WC	(United States) B Mattek-Sands (United States) M Washington	6	6
WC	(Russia) S Kuznetsova (France) A Mauresmo	6	7
2	(Spain) A Medina Garrigues (Spain) V Ruano Pascual	2	6^{5}

Second round
(Czech Republic) I Benešová (Czech Republic) B Záhlavová-Strýcová	6	7
(United States) R Kops-Jones (United States) A Spears	1	5
(Argentina) G Dulko (Israel) S Pe'er	6	6
(Chinese Taipei) S-w Hsieh (China) S Peng	3	1
6	(Spain) N Llagostera Vives (Spain) MJ Martínez Sánchez	6	6
(Russia) E Makarova (Belarus) T Poutchek	2	1
WC	(United States) B Mattek-Sands (United States) M Washington	4	7	[10]
WC	(Russia) S Kuznetsova (France) A Mauresmo	6	5	[6]

Quarterfinals
(Czech Republic) I Benešová (Czech Republic) B Záhlavová-Strýcová	7	3	[12]
(Argentina) G Dulko (Israel) S Pe'er	5	6	[14]
6	(Spain) N Llagostera Vives (Spain) MJ Martínez Sánchez	6	6
WC	(United States) B Mattek-Sands (United States) M Washington	1	2

Semifinals
(Argentina) G Dulko (Israel) S Pe'er	6	6
6	(Spain) N Llagostera Vives (Spain) MJ Martínez Sánchez	3	3
