= 2011 in tennis =

This page covers all the important events in the sport of tennis in 2011. Primarily, it provides the results of notable tournaments throughout the year on both the ATP and WTA Tours, the Davis Cup, and the Fed Cup.

== ITF ==
=== Grand Slam events ===
Championship	Category	Champion(s)	Finalist(s)	Score in the final
Australian Open (January 17 – January 30)	Men's singles	(Serbia) Novak Djokovic	(United Kingdom) Andy Murray	6–4, 6–2, 6–3
Australian Open (January 17 – January 30)	Women's singles	(Belgium) Kim Clijsters	(China) Li Na	3–6, 6–3, 6–3
Australian Open (January 17 – January 30)	Men's doubles	(United States) Bob Bryan (United States) Mike Bryan	(India) Mahesh Bhupathi (India) Leander Paes	6–3, 6–4
Australian Open (January 17 – January 30)	Women's doubles	(Argentina) Gisela Dulko (Italy) Flavia Pennetta	(Belarus) Victoria Azarenka (Russia) Maria Kirilenko	2–6, 7–5, 6–1
Australian Open (January 17 – January 30)	Mixed doubles	(Slovenia) Katarina Srebotnik (Canada) Daniel Nestor	(Chinese Taipei) Yung-Jan Chan (Australia) Paul Hanley	6–3, 3–6, [10–7]

Championship	Category	Champion(s)	Finalist(s)	Score in the final
French Open (May 23 – June 5)	Men's singles	(Spain) Rafael Nadal	(Switzerland) Roger Federer	7–5, 7–6(3), 5–7, 6–1
French Open (May 23 – June 5)	Women's singles	(China) Li Na	(Italy) Francesca Schiavone	6–4, 7–6(0)
French Open (May 23 – June 5)	Men's doubles	(Belarus) Max Mirnyi (Canada) Daniel Nestor	(Colombia) Juan Sebastián Cabal (Argentina) Eduardo Schwank	7–6(3), 3–6, 6–4
French Open (May 23 – June 5)	Women's doubles	(Czech Republic) Andrea Hlaváčková (Czech Republic) Lucie Hradecká	(India) Sania Mirza (Russia) Elena Vesnina	6–4, 6–3
French Open (May 23 – June 5)	Mixed doubles	(Australia) Casey Dellacqua (United States) Scott Lipsky	(Slovenia) Katarina Srebotnik (Canada) Daniel Nestor	7–6(6), 4–6, [10–7]

Championship	Category	Champion(s)	Finalist(s)	Score in the final
Wimbledon Championships (June 20 – July 3)	Men's singles	(Serbia) Novak Djokovic	(Spain) Rafael Nadal	6–4, 6–1, 1–6, 6–3
Wimbledon Championships (June 20 – July 3)	Women's singles	(Czech Republic) Petra Kvitová	(Russia) Maria Sharapova	6–3, 6–4
Wimbledon Championships (June 20 – July 3)	Men's doubles	(United States) Bob Bryan (United States) Mike Bryan	(Sweden) Robert Lindstedt (Romania) Horia Tecău	6–3, 6–4, 7–6(2)
Wimbledon Championships (June 20 – July 3)	Women's doubles	(Czech Republic) Květa Peschke (Slovenia) Katarina Srebotnik	(Germany) Sabine Lisicki (Australia) Samantha Stosur	6–3, 6–1
Wimbledon Championships (June 20 – July 3)	Mixed doubles	(Czech Republic) Iveta Benešová (Austria) Jürgen Melzer	(Russia) Elena Vesnina (India) Mahesh Bhupathi	6–3, 6–2

Championship	Category	Champion(s)	Finalist(s)	Score in the final
US Open (August 29 – September 11)	Men's singles	(Serbia) Novak Djokovic	(Spain) Rafael Nadal	6–2, 6–4, 6–7(3), 6–1
US Open (August 29 – September 11)	Women's singles	(Australia) Samantha Stosur	(United States) Serena Williams	6–2, 6–3
US Open (August 29 – September 11)	Men's doubles	(Austria) Jürgen Melzer (Germany) Philipp Petzschner	(Poland) Mariusz Fyrstenberg (Poland) Marcin Matkowski	6–2, 6–2
US Open (August 29 – September 11)	Women's doubles	(United States) Liezel Huber (United States) Lisa Raymond	(United States) Vania King (Kazakhstan) Yaroslava Shvedova	4–6, 7–6(5), 7–6(3)
US Open (August 29 – September 11)	Mixed doubles	(United States) Melanie Oudin (United States) Jack Sock	(Argentina) Gisela Dulko (Argentina) Eduardo Schwank	7–6(4), 4–6, [10–8]

- Just 6 male players reached at least the third round of all four grand slams: Rafael Nadal, David Ferrer, Jo-Wilfried Tsonga, Andy Murray, Novak Djokovic, and Roger Federer. Of this group, all but Tsonga would reach the fourth round of all four majors, with Federer and Nadal reaching all four quarterfinals and Djokovic and Murray reaching all four semifinals.
- Just 9 female players reached at least the third round of all four grand slams: Caroline Wozniacki, Svetlana Kuznetsova, Francesca Schiavone, Andrea Petkovic, Julia Görges, Maria Sharapova, Victoria Azarenka, Peng Shuai, and Vera Zvonareva. No player would reach at least the fourth round of all four majors.
- This was the first year since 2002 in which Roger Federer did not win a grand slam.

=== Davis Cup ===
World Group Draw

- S-Seeded
- U-Unseeded
- * Choice of ground

First round 4–6 March
Novi Sad, Serbia (indoor hard)
1	Serbia	4
India	1
Borås, Sweden (indoor hard)
7	Russia	2
Sweden	3
Ostrava, Czech Republic (hard)
4	Czech Republic	2
Kazakhstan	3
Buenos Aires, Argentina (clay)
5	Argentina	4
Romania	1
Santiago, Chile (clay)
Chile	1
6	United States	4
Charleroi, Belgium (hard)
Belgium	1
3	Spain	4
Zagreb, Croatia (indoor hard)
Germany	3
8	Croatia	2
Vienna, Austria (indoor clay)
Austria	2
2	France	3

Quarterfinals; 8–10 July
Halmstad, Sweden (indoor hard)
1	Serbia	4
Sweden	1
Buenos Aires, Argentina (clay) 7–9 July
Kazakhstan	0
5	Argentina	5
Austin, United States (indoor hard)
6	United States	1
3	Spain	3
Stuttgart, Germany (indoor hard)
Germany	1
2	France	4

Semifinals
Belgrade, Serbia (indoor hard)
1	Serbia	2
5	Argentina	3
Córdoba, Spain (clay)
3	Spain	4
2	France	1

Final
Seville, Spain (clay)
Argentina	1
Spain	3

=== Fed Cup ===
World Group Draw

- S-Seeded
- U-Unseeded
- * Choice of ground

Quarterfinals; 5–6 February
Hobart, Australia (Outdoor hard)
Australia	1
1	Italy	4
Moscow, Russia (Indoor hard)
3	Russia	3
France	2
Bratislava, Slovakia (Indoor hard)
Slovakia	2
4	Czech Republic	3
Antwerp, Belgium (Indoor hard)
Belgium	4
2	United States	1

Semifinals; 16–17 April
Moscow, Russia (Indoor hard)
1	Italy	0
3	Russia	5
Charleroi, Belgium (Indoor hard)
4	Czech Republic	3
Belgium	2

Final; 5–6 November
Moscow, Russia (Indoor hard)
3	Russia	2
4	Czech Republic	3

== Important Events ==
=== January ===
- John Isner and Bethanie Mattek-Sands of the United States teamed up to defeat Belgium's Ruben Bemelmans and Justine Henin in the Hopman Cup final.
- Venus Williams retired for the first time in 251 Grand Slam matches in her third round match against Andrea Petković at the Australian Open due to a pelvic injury she sustained in the previous round.
- Francesca Schiavone defeated Svetlana Kuznetsova 6–4, 1–6, 16–14 in four hours and forty-four minutes in the fourth round of the Australian Open, making it the longest played Grand Slam women's singles tennis match in the Open Era.
- Rafael Nadal's bid to become the first man to hold all four Grand Slams since Rod Laver in 1969 was denied by David Ferrer in the quarterfinals of the Australian Open.
- Roger Federer followed up his win in Qatar by reaching the semifinals of the Australian Open, accumulating an Open Era record of 59 matches won at the year's first major.
- Justine Henin announced her second retirement from the sport in three years due to a lingering elbow injury sustained at the 2010 Wimbledon Championships.
- Kim Clijsters won her third Grand Slam title since coming out of retirement in 2009 by defeating Li Na in the Australian Open final. Na was the first Chinese woman to reach a Grand Slam final.
- Novak Djokovic defeated Andy Murray in straight sets to win his second Australian Open title. Murray became the first man to lose seven consecutive sets in Grand Slam final appearances, accumulating nine in total.
- On January 31, for the first time in the history of the WTA, ten different nations were represented in the association's list of top ten players.
- Robin Söderling, Stanislas Wawrinka, Petra Kvitová, Gréta Arn, Gilles Simon, David Ferrer, Li Na, and Jarmila Groth also won titles.

=== February ===
Championship	Category	Champion(s)	Finalist(s)	Score in the final
Dubai (February 14 – February 20) – Women (February 21 – February 27) – Men	Men's singles	(Serbia) Novak Djokovic	(Switzerland) Roger Federer	6–3, 6–3
Dubai (February 14 – February 20) – Women (February 21 – February 27) – Men	Women's singles	(Denmark) Caroline Wozniacki	(Russia) Svetlana Kuznetsova	6–1, 6–3
Dubai (February 14 – February 20) – Women (February 21 – February 27) – Men	Men's doubles	(Ukraine) Sergiy Stakhovsky (Russia) Mikhail Youzhny	(France) Jérémy Chardy (Spain) Feliciano López	4–6, 6–3, [10–3]
Dubai (February 14 – February 20) – Women (February 21 – February 27) – Men	Women's doubles	(United States) Liezel Huber (Spain) María José Martínez Sánchez	(Czech Republic) Květa Peschke (Slovenia) Katarina Srebotnik	7–6(3), 6–3

- Kevin Anderson, Ivan Dodig, and Milos Raonic all won their maiden ATP Tour singles title in Johannesburg, Zagreb, and San Jose, respectively.
- By successfully defending his title in Rotterdam and winning the Open 13, Robin Söderling opened 2011 with an impressive 17–1 record.
- Andy Roddick reached his fiftieth ATP tour final, and won his thirtieth tour title at the Regions Morgan Keegan Championships.
- After playing only three tournaments in 2010, and reaching back-to-back semis in his previous two tournaments, Juan Martín del Potro reached his first final since winning the 2009 US Open at the Delray Beach International Tennis Championships. He defeated Janko Tipsarević in the final.
- Tommy Robredo, Nicolás Almagro (2), Petra Kvitová, Daniela Hantuchová, Magdaléna Rybáriková, Lourdes Domínguez Lino, David Ferrer, Vera Zvonareva, and Gisela Dulko also won titles.

=== March ===
Championship	Category	Champion(s)	Finalist(s)	Score in the final
Indian Wells (March 7 – March 20)	Men's singles	(Serbia) Novak Djokovic	(Spain) Rafael Nadal	4–6, 6–3, 6–2
Indian Wells (March 7 – March 20)	Women's singles	(Denmark) Caroline Wozniacki	(France) Marion Bartoli	6–1, 2–6, 6–3
Indian Wells (March 7 – March 20)	Men's doubles	(Ukraine) Alexandr Dolgopolov (Belgium) Xavier Malisse	(Switzerland) Roger Federer (Switzerland) Stanislas Wawrinka	6–3, 6–7(5), [10–7]
Indian Wells (March 7 – March 20)	Women's doubles	(India) Sania Mirza (Russia) Elena Vesnina	(United States) Bethanie Mattek-Sands (United States) Meghann Shaughnessy	6–0, 7–5

Championship	Category	Champion(s)	Finalist(s)	Score in the final
Miami (March 21 – April 3)	Men's singles	(Serbia) Novak Djokovic	(Spain) Rafael Nadal	4–6, 6–3, 7–6(4)
Miami (March 21 – April 3)	Women's singles	(Belarus) Victoria Azarenka	(Russia) Maria Sharapova	6–1, 6–4
Miami (March 21 – April 3)	Men's doubles	(India) Mahesh Bhupathi (India) Leander Paes	(Belarus) Max Mirnyi (Canada) Daniel Nestor	6–7(5), 6–2, [10–5]
Miami (March 21 – April 3)	Women's doubles	(Slovakia) Daniela Hantuchová (Poland) Agnieszka Radwańska	(United States) Liezel Huber (Russia) Nadia Petrova	7–6(5), 2–6, [10–8]

- Ivo Karlović set the record for the fastest serve, hitting a 156 mph serve in Davis Cup play against Germany.
- Anastasia Pavlyuchenkova and Jelena Dokić each won titles heading into Indian Wells and Miami. It was Dokić's first title in nine years, while Pavlyuchenkova successfully defended her title to build a 10–0 record in Monterrey.

=== April ===
- By winning Marbella, Victoria Azarenka extended her winning streak to a career-best 11 consecutive match wins. The win also bumped Azarenka up to a career-best world number five ranking.
- Rafael Nadal won his unprecedented, seventh consecutive Monte-Carlo Rolex Masters title, increasing his winning streak at the event to 37 matches. The following week, Nadal became the first player to win two tournaments six or more times in the Open Era by winning his sixth Barcelona title.
- The German, Serbian, Spanish, and Ukrainian Fed Cup teams won spots in the 2012 World Group. It is the first time in Fed Cup history that neither the United States or France will be represented in the World Group.
- Anabel Medina Garrigues won her ninth clay court title of her career at the Estoril Open, tying her with Venus Williams for the most clay court titles among active players.
- Ryan Sweeting, Pablo Andújar, Caroline Wozniacki, Julia Görges, Alberta Brianti, Nikolay Davydenko, Novak Djokovic, Juan Martín del Potro, and Roberta Vinci also won titles.

=== May ===
- On May 9, for the first time since each list was adopted, there were no Americans in either top ten of the ATP Tour or WTA Tour.
- Andy Murray became the first British player to reach the semifinals at the Rome Masters since 1932, ultimately falling to Novak Djokovic.
- Nicolás Almagro, Caroline Wozniacki, and Andrea Petković also won titles.

Championship	Category	Champion(s)	Finalist(s)	Score in the final
Madrid (May 2 - May 8)	Men's singles	(Serbia) Novak Djokovic	(Spain) Rafael Nadal	7–5, 6–4
Madrid (May 2 - May 8)	Women's singles	(Czech Republic) Petra Kvitová	(Belarus) Victoria Azarenka	7–6(3), 6–4
Madrid (May 2 - May 8)	Men's doubles	(United States) Bob Bryan (United States) Mike Bryan	(France) Michaël Llodra (Serbia) Nenad Zimonjić	6–3, 6–3
Madrid (May 2 - May 8)	Women's doubles	(Belarus) Victoria Azarenka (Russia) Maria Kirilenko	(Czech Republic) Květa Peschke (Slovenia) Katarina Srebotnik	6–4, 6–3

Championship	Category	Champion(s)	Finalist(s)	Score in the final
Rome (May 9 – May 15)	Men's singles	(Serbia) Novak Djokovic	(Spain) Rafael Nadal	6–4, 6–4
Rome (May 9 – May 15)	Women's singles	(Russia) Maria Sharapova	(Australia) Samantha Stosur	6–2, 6–4
Rome (May 9 – May 15)	Men's doubles	(United States) John Isner (United States) Sam Querrey	(United States) Mardy Fish (United States) Andy Roddick	w/o
Rome (May 9 – May 15)	Women's doubles	(China) Peng Shuai (China) Zheng Jie	(United States) Vania King (Kazakhstan) Yaroslava Shvedova	6–2, 6–3

=== June ===
- Five-time French Open champion, Rafael Nadal, played his first 5-set match at the tournament since his winning debut in 2005. He defeated John Isner 6–4, 6–7(2), 6–7(2), 6–2, 6–4 in just over four hours. (Occurred in May)
- Roger Federer advanced to a record 28th consecutive Grand Slam quarterfinal, surpassing Jimmy Connors mark of 27. Federer went on to stun Novak Djokovic in the semifinals, breaking the Serb's perfect record from the start of the season and also preventing him from becoming the World Number One.
- Kim Clijsters and Caroline Wozniacki lost in the second and third rounds, respectively, of the French Open. It is the first time in the Open Era that both of the top two seeded women at a Grand Slam failed to reach the round of sixteen. Vera Zvonareva's departure in the fourth round meant that for just the third time in the Open Era, none of the top three seeds advanced to the quarterfinals of a Grand Slam.
- Li Na became the first Chinese player to win a Grand Slam singles title at the French Open.
- Rafael Nadal won his record-tying sixth French Open title, which allowed him to be the second man to qualify for the ATP World Tour Finals.
- Philipp Kohlschreiber, Andy Murray, Sabine Lisicki, Caroline Wozniacki, Dmitry Tursunov, Andreas Seppi, Marion Bartoli, and Roberta Vinci also won titles.

=== July ===
- For the first time in the Open Era, eight different European nations were represented in the women's quarterfinals of a Grand Slam at The Wimbledon Championships.
- By reaching the final of The Wimbledon Championships, Novak Djokovic became the first man other than Roger Federer or Rafael Nadal to hold the World Number One ranking since 2004. He went on to defeat Nadal in the final to win his first Wimbledon title.
- Maria Sharapova reached her second Wimbledon final after seven years, the longest span between final appearances at The Championships. She was defeated by first time Grand Slam finalist Petra Kvitová.
- John Isner, Roberta Vinci, Polona Hercog, Juan Carlos Ferrero, Robin Söderling, Anabel Medina Garrigues, María José Martínez Sánchez, Gilles Simon, Vera Zvonareva, Marcel Granollers, Alexandr Dolgopolov, and Nadia Petrova also won titles.

US Open Series Week	Date	Men's Events	Women's Events
1	July 18–24	Atlanta (United States) Mardy Fish	No Series Event Held This Week
2	July 25–31	Los Angeles (Latvia) Ernests Gulbis	Stanford (United States) Serena Williams

=== August ===
- Novak Djokovic lost only his second match of the year when he was forced to retire in the second set of the championship match in Cincinnati against Andy Murray.
- Robin Haase won his maiden ATP Tour singles title in Kitzbühel

US Open Series Week	Date	Men's Events	Women's Events
3	Aug 1–7	Washington, D.C. (Czech Republic) Radek Štěpánek	San Diego (Poland) Agnieszka Radwańska
4	Aug 8–14	Montreal (Serbia) Novak Djokovic	Toronto (United States) Serena Williams
5	Aug 15–21	Cincinnati (United Kingdom) Andy Murray	Cincinnati (Russia) Maria Sharapova
6	Aug 22–28	Winston-Salem (United States) John Isner	New Haven (Denmark) Caroline Wozniacki

=== September ===
- Florian Mayer, Jo-Wilfried Tsonga, Janko Tipsarević and Andy Murray won ATP tour titles.
- Barbora Záhlavová-Strýcová, Ksenia Pervak, Chanelle Scheepers, María José Martínez Sánchez and Agnieszka Radwańska won WTA tour titles.

=== October ===
Championship	Category	Champion(s)	Finalist(s)	Score in the final
Beijing (October 3 – October 9)	Men's singles	(Czech Republic) Tomáš Berdych	(Croatia) Marin Čilić	3–6, 6–4, 6–1
Beijing (October 3 – October 9)	Women's singles	(Poland) Agnieszka Radwańska	(Germany) Andrea Petkovic	7–5, 0–6, 6–4
Beijing (October 3 – October 9)	Men's doubles	(France) Michaël Llodra (Serbia) Nenad Zimonjić	(Sweden) Robert Lindstedt (Romania) Horia Tecău	7–6^{(7–2)}, 7–6^{(7–4)}
Beijing (October 3 – October 9)	Women's doubles	(Czech Republic) Květa Peschke (Slovenia) Katarina Srebotnik	(Argentina) Gisela Dulko (Italy) Flavia Pennetta	6–3, 6–4

Championship	Category	Champion(s)	Finalist(s)	Score in the final
Tour Championships - Istanbul (October 24 – October 30)	Women's singles	(Czech Republic) Petra Kvitová	(Belarus) Victoria Azarenka	7–5, 4–6, 6–3
Tour Championships - Istanbul (October 24 – October 30)	Women's doubles	(United States) Liezel Huber (United States) Lisa Raymond	(Czech Republic) Květa Peschke (Slovenia) Katarina Srebotnik	6–4, 6–4

=== November ===
Championship	Category	Champion	Finalist	Score in the final
Tournament of Champions - Bali (November 2 – November 6)	Women's singles	(Serbia) Ana Ivanovic	(Spain) Anabel Medina Garrigues	6–3, 6–0

Championship	Category	Champion(s)	Finalist(s)	Score in the final
ATP World Tour Finals - London (November 21 – November 28)	Men's singles	(Switzerland) Roger Federer	(France) Jo-Wilfried Tsonga	6–3, 6–7^{(6–8)}, 6–3
ATP World Tour Finals - London (November 21 – November 28)	Men's doubles	(Belarus) Max Mirnyi (Canada) Daniel Nestor	(Poland) Mariusz Fyrstenberg (Poland) Marcin Matkowski	7–5, 6–3

== International Tennis Hall of Fame ==
- Class of 2010:
  - Andre Agassi, player
  - Peachy Kellmeyer, contributor
