= 2011 Bank of the West Classic – Singles qualifying =

This article displays the qualifying draw of the 2011 Bank of the West Classic.

== Players ==
=== Seeds ===
1. (New Zealand) Marina Erakovic (qualified)
2. (Poland) Urszula Radwańska (qualified)
3. (Ukraine) Olga Savchuk (qualified)
4. (United States) Alexa Glatch (second round)
5. (Croatia) Ajla Tomljanović (qualifying competition)
6. (Canada) Heidi El Tabakh (first round)
7. (Japan) Rika Fujiwara (qualified)
8. (Canada) Sharon Fichman (qualifying competition)

=== Qualifiers ===
1. (New Zealand) Marina Erakovic
2. (Poland) Urszula Radwańska
3. (Ukraine) Olga Savchuk
4. (Japan) Rika Fujiwara

== Qualifying draw ==
=== First qualifier ===
First round
(Japan) Shuko Aoyama	6	7^{7}
(United States) Krista Hardebeck	3	6^{4}
(Canada) Marie-Ève Pelletier	3	7^{10}	6
(Russia) Olga Puchkova	6	6^{8}	4
WC	(United States) Stacey Tan	7	6
6	(Canada) Heidi El Tabakh	5	1

Second round
1	(New Zealand) Marina Erakovic	7^{7}	6
(Japan) Shuko Aoyama	6^{3}	4
(Canada) Marie-Ève Pelletier	6	6
WC	(United States) Stacey Tan	0	0

Qualifying competition
1	(New Zealand) Marina Erakovic	6	6
(Canada) Marie-Ève Pelletier	3	1

=== Second qualifier ===
First round
(Israel) Julia Glushko	5	3
(United States) Ashley Weinhold	7	6
(United States) Ahsha Rolle	3	1
WC	(United States) Nicole Gibbs	6	6
(Bolivia) María Fernanda Álvarez Terán	7	2	6^{3}
5	(Croatia) Ajla Tomljanović	5	6	7^{7}

Second round
2	(Poland) Urszula Radwańska	6	7^{7}
(United States) Ashley Weinhold	1	6^{4}
WC	(United States) Nicole Gibbs	4	6	1
5	(Croatia) Ajla Tomljanović	6	1	6

Qualifying competition
2	(Poland) Urszula Radwańska	6	5	6
5	(Croatia) Ajla Tomljanović	3	7	1

=== Third qualifier ===
First round
WC	(United States) Maria Sanchez	2	5
(Thailand) Nicha Lertpitaksinchai	6	7
(United States) Julia Boserup	6	7^{9}
(United States) Alexandra Stevenson	3	6^{7}
(Croatia) Jelena Pandžić	2	1
8	(Canada) Sharon Fichman	6	6

Second round
3	(Ukraine) Olga Savchuk	6	6
(Thailand) Nicha Lertpitaksinchai	3	3
(United States) Julia Boserup	2	5
8	(Canada) Sharon Fichman	6	7

Qualifying competition
3	(Ukraine) Olga Savchuk	6	6
8	(Canada) Sharon Fichman	1	4

=== Fourth qualifier ===
First round
WC	(United States) Kristie Ahn	5	0
(United States) Abigail Spears	7	6
WC	(United States) Ellen Tsay	6	3	5
(China) Sun Shengnan	4	6	7
WC	(United States) Jessica Pegula	6	2	5
7	(Japan) Rika Fujiwara	3	6	7

Second round
4	(United States) Alexa Glatch	6	2	4
(United States) Abigail Spears	4	6	6
(China) Sun Shengnan	6	6^{3}	3
7	(Japan) Rika Fujiwara	4	7^{7}	6

Qualifying competition
(United States) Abigail Spears	6	5	0
7	(Japan) Rika Fujiwara	4	7	6
