= 2012 Winston-Salem Open =

- Date: August 19–25
- Edition: 44th
- Category: World Tour 250
- Surface: Hard / outdoor
- Location: Winston-Salem, North Carolina, United States

Champions

Singles
- (United States) John Isner

Doubles
- (Mexico) Santiago González / (United States) Scott Lipsky
← 2011 ·	Winston-Salem Open	· 2013 →

The 2012 Winston-Salem Open was a tennis tournament played on outdoor hard courts. It was the 44th edition of the Winston-Salem Open, and was part of the ATP World Tour 250 Series of the 2012 ATP World Tour. It took place at the Wake Forest University in Winston-Salem, North Carolina, United States, from August 19 through August 25, 2012. It was the last event on the 2012 US Open Series before the 2012 US Open. John Isner won the singles title.

== Singles main-draw entrants ==
=== Seeds ===
Country	Player	Ranking*	Seed
FRA	Jo-Wilfried Tsonga	6	1
CZE	Tomáš Berdych	7	2
USA	John Isner	11	3
UKR	Alexandr Dolgopolov	15	4
USA	Andy Roddick	21	5
ESP	Marcel Granollers	25	6
USA	Sam Querrey	29	7
FRA	Julien Benneteau	30	8
ESP	Feliciano López	31	9
SRB	Viktor Troicki	32	10
UZB	Denis Istomin	33	11
RSA	Kevin Anderson	34	12
AUT	Jürgen Melzer	36	13
ARG	David Nalbandian	39	14
ESP	Pablo Andújar	40	15
FIN	Jarkko Nieminen	41	16

- Seedings are based on the rankings of August 13, 2012

=== Other entrants ===
The following players received wildcards into the singles main draw:

- (Czech Republic) Tomáš Berdych
- (United States) James Blake
- (United States) Ryan Harrison
- (Argentina) David Nalbandian

The following players received entry from the qualifying draw:

- (Germany) Benjamin Becker
- (Latvia) Ernests Gulbis
- (United States) Michael McClune
- (Ukraine) Sergiy Stakhovsky

=== Withdrawals ===
- (France) Gaël Monfils (knee injury)

=== Retirements ===
- (Cyprus) Marcos Baghdatis (lower back injury)

== Doubles main-draw entrants ==
=== Seeds ===
Country	Player	Country	Player	Rank^{1}	Seed
IND	Rohan Bopanna	POL	Mariusz Fyrstenberg	20	1
GBR	Jonathan Marray	DNK	Frederik Nielsen	47	2
GBR	Colin Fleming	GBR	Ross Hutchins	55	3
FRA	Michaël Llodra	FRA	Nicolas Mahut	65	4

- Rankings are as of August 13, 2012

=== Other entrants ===
The following pair received wildcard into the doubles main draw:

- (Israel) Jonathan Erlich / (Israel) Andy Ram

The following pair received entry as alternates:

- (Spain) Pablo Andújar / (Argentina) Leonardo Mayer

=== Withdrawals ===
- (Cyprus) Marcos Baghdatis (lower back injury)

=== Retirements ===
- (France) Nicolas Mahut (knee injury)

== Finals ==
=== Singles ===
(United States) John Isner defeated (Czech Republic) Tomáš Berdych, 3–6, 6–4, 7–6^{(11–9)}

- It was Isner's 2nd title of the year and 5th of his career.

=== Doubles ===
(Mexico) Santiago González / (United States) Scott Lipsky defeated (Spain) Pablo Andújar / (Argentina) Leonardo Mayer, 6–3, 4–6, [10–2]

- It was Gonzalez's 2nd title of the year and 5th of his career. It was Lipsky's 2nd title of the year and 8th of his career. As a team, it was their 2nd title of the year and 3rd of their career together.
