= 2011 US Open Series =

In tennis, the eighth edition of the US Open Series (known as Olympus US Open Series for sponsorships reasons), includes ten hard court tournaments that start on July 18, 2011 in Atlanta and will end in Winston-Salem for the men and in New Haven for the women on August 28, 2011. This edition has scheduled five separate men's tournaments, four women's tournaments, and the Western & Southern Open that will host both a men's and women's event. The series includes two ATP World Tour Masters 1000 and two WTA Premier 5 events to headline the series.

== Point distribution for series events ==
To be included in the standings and subsequently the bonus prize money, a player has to have countable results from two different tournaments. Players finishing in the top three in the series can earn up to $1 million in extra prize money at the US Open. Roger Federer received the largest US Open pay day of $2.4 million in 2007 after capturing the title in both the US Open Series and the US Open championship.

Round	ATP Masters Series 1000 WTA Premier 5 Series	ATP World Tour 500/250 WTA Premier Series
Champion	100	70
Finalist	70	45
Semifinalist	45	25
Quarterfinalist	25	15
Round of 16	15	0

== US Open Series standings ==
The standings below include all players who have received points from at least two tournaments in the US Open Series.

=== ATP ===
Rank	Nation	Player	Tours ^{1}	Titles	Points
1	USA	Mardy Fish	4	1	230
2	SRB	Novak Djokovic	2	1	170
3	USA	John Isner	3	1	140
4	FRA	Gaël Monfils	3	-	95
5	LAT	Ernests Gulbis	2	1	85
=	CZE	Radek Štěpánek	2	1	85
7	CZE	Tomáš Berdych	2	-	70
8	SRB	Janko Tipsarević	2	-	60
9	USA	Ryan Harrison	2	-	50
10	ESP	Nicolás Almagro	2	-	40
=	SUI	Roger Federer	2	-	40
12	RSA	Kevin Anderson	2	-	30
=	TPE	Yen-Hsun Lu	2	-	30
=	SRB	Viktor Troicki	2	-	30

- as of August 16, 2011

==== Notes ====
- 1 – Tours – Number of tournaments in US Open Series in which a player has reached the quarterfinals or better, in 250 and 500 series events or the Round of 16 in ATP World Tour Masters 1000 events.

=== WTA ===
Rank	Nation	Player	Tours ^{1}	Titles	Points
1	USA	Serena Williams	2	2 (1st, 2nd)	170
2	POL	Agnieszka Radwańska	3	1	130
=	RUS	Maria Sharapova	3	1	130
4	RUS	Vera Zvonareva	3	-	105
5	GER	Andrea Petković	3	-	95
=	AUS	Samantha Stosur	2	-	95
7	FRA	Marion Bartoli	3	-	75
8	CHN	Li Na	3	-	55
=	ITA	Francesca Schiavone	3	-	55
10	SVK	Daniela Hantuchová	2	-	40
=	SRB	Ana Ivanovic	2	-	40
=	GER	Sabine Lisicki	2	-	40
=	CHN	Peng Shuai	2	-	40
14	CZE	Petra Kvitová	2	-	30
=	USA	Christina McHale	2	-	30

- as of August 16, 2011

==== Notes ====
- 1 – Tours – Number of tournaments in US Open Series in which a player has reached the quarterfinals or better, in Premier events; or the Round of 16 or better in Premier 5 events.

== 2011 schedule ==
Legend
Grand Slam Event
ATP Masters 1000 and WTA Premier 5
ATP World Tour 500 and WTA Premier
ATP World Tour 250

Week	Date	Men's Events	Women's Events
1	July 18–24	Atlanta; Atlanta Tennis Championships; 2011 Champion: (United States) Mardy Fish	No Series Event Held This Week
2	July 25–31	Los Angeles; Farmers Classic presented by Mercedes-Benz; 2011 Champion: (Latvia) Ernests Gulbis	Stanford; Bank of the West Classic; 2011 Champion: (United States) Serena Williams
3	Aug 1–7	Washington, D.C. Legg Mason Tennis Classic Presented by Geico; 2011 Champion: (Czech Republic) Radek Štěpánek	San Diego; Mercury Insurance Open; 2011 Champion: (Poland) Agnieszka Radwańska
4	Aug 8–14	Montreal; Rogers Cup Presented by National Bank; 2011 Champion: (Serbia) Novak Djokovic	Toronto; Rogers Cup; 2011 Champion: (United States) Serena Williams
5	Aug 15–21	Cincinnati; Western & Southern Open; 2011 Champion: (United Kingdom) Andy Murray	Cincinnati; Western & Southern Open; 2011 Champion: (Russia) Maria Sharapova
6	Aug 21–28	Winston-Salem; Winston-Salem Open; 2011 Champion: (United States) John Isner	New Haven; New Haven Open at Yale presented by First Niagara; 2011 Champion: (Denmark) Caroline Wozniacki
7–8	Aug 29 – Sep 11	New York; US Open; 2011 Champion: (Serbia) Novak Djokovic	New York; US Open; 2011 Champion: (Australia) Samantha Stosur

== Week 1 ==
=== ATP – Atlanta Tennis Championships ===
Defending champion, Mardy Fish, last year's finalist, John Isner, and 2010 semifinalist, Kevin Anderson, headlined the event. Isner was nearly the first big upset of the tournament, needing nearly three hours to defeat fellow American James Blake in the second round. Nineteen-year-old Ryan Harrison reached his first ATP Tour semifinal, but ultimately fell to Fish who defeated Isner in a rematch of last year's final.

==== Main Draw Finals ====
Quarterfinals
1	(United States) Mardy Fish	6	6
8	(India) Somdev Devvarman	4	3
(United States) Ryan Harrison	4	6	7
Q	(United States) Rajeev Ram	6	1	6^{5}
(Chinese Taipei) Lu Yen-hsun	1	2
3	(United States) John Isner	6	6
(Luxembourg) Gilles Müller	7	7
2	(South Africa) Kevin Anderson	6^{3}	6^{3}

Semifinals
1	(United States) Mardy Fish	6	6
(United States) Ryan Harrison	2	4
3	(United States) John Isner	7	6^{3}	6
(Luxembourg) Gilles Müller	5	7	1

Final
1	(United States) Mardy Fish	3	7	6
3	(United States) John Isner	6	6^{6}	2

== Week 2 ==
=== ATP – Farmers Classic ===
Atlanta champion, Mardy Fish, and 2009 US Open champion, Juan Martín del Potro, headlined the event. Despite being unseeded, Lu Yen-hsun and Ryan Harrison brought their good form from Atlanta to achieve consecutive quarterfinal appearances in the Series. Fish also continued on with his good form, extending his winning streak to seven matches. He was joined by three unseeded players in the semifinals, including Ernests Gulbis, who went on to upset Fish in the final.

==== Main Draw Finals ====
Quarterfinals
1	(United States) Mardy Fish	6	6
8	(Russia) Igor Kunitsyn	2	4
(Chinese Taipei) Lu Yen-hsun	6	3	4
SE	(United States) Ryan Harrison	3	6	6
(United States) Alex Bogomolov, Jr.	1	6	6
4	(Brazil) Thomaz Bellucci	6	4	1
(Latvia) Ernests Gulbis	6	6
2	(Argentina) Juan Martín del Potro	2	4

Semifinals
1	(United States) Mardy Fish	6	4	7
SE	(United States) Ryan Harrison	0	6	6^{3}
(United States) Alex Bogomolov, Jr.	2	6^{4}
(Latvia) Ernests Gulbis	6	7

Final
1	(United States) Mardy Fish	7	4	4
(Latvia) Ernests Gulbis	5	6	6

=== WTA – Bank of the West Classic ===
Defending champion, Victoria Azarenka, last year's finalist, Maria Sharapova, and 13-time Grand Slam champion, Serena Williams, headlined the event. Playing her first tournament on American soil since 2009, Williams showed excellent form, serving bagels in her opening round match, and followed that win by upsetting Sharapova in the quarterfinals. With Azarenka's exit in the second round, Marion Bartoli took advantage of the open draw and advanced to the final. In only her third tournament of the year, Williams defeated Bartoli to take the title.

==== Main Draw Finals ====
Quarterfinals
Q	(New Zealand) Marina Erakovic	1	1
8/WC	(Slovakia) Dominika Cibulková	6	6
3	(France) Marion Bartoli	6	0
(Japan) Ayumi Morita	1	0^{r}
5	(Poland) Agnieszka Radwańska	6^{4}	6	2
(Germany) Sabine Lisicki	7	2	6
(United States) Serena Williams	6	6
2	(Russia) Maria Sharapova	1	3

Semifinals
8/WC	(Slovakia) Dominika Cibulková
3	(France) Marion Bartoli	w/o
(Germany) Sabine Lisicki	1	2
(United States) Serena Williams	6	6

Final
3	(France) Marion Bartoli	5	1
(United States) Serena Williams	7	6

== Week 3 ==
=== ATP – Legg Mason Tennis Classic ===
Gaël Monfils and defending champion, David Nalbandian, headlined the event. Atlanta champion, Mardy Fish, who also reached the final of the Farmers Classic, was forced to withdraw from the tournament, citing a bruised right heel. Serbian duo, Viktor Troicki and Janko Tipsarević, who were expected to reach the quarterfinals because of their seedings, joined the lower-ranked American duo, John Isner and Donald Young, in the final eight. Radek Štěpánek took advantage of Fish's withdrawal from the tournament and advanced to the final, where he took out top seed Monfils for his fifth title of his career.

==== Main Draw Finals ====
Quarterfinals
1/WC	(France) Gaël Monfils	6	6
6	(Serbia) Janko Tipsarević	4	4
3	(Serbia) Viktor Troicki	6^{5}	6	1
11	(United States) John Isner	7	3	6
7	(Cyprus) Marcos Baghdatis	3	6^{4}
(United States) Donald Young	6	7
5/WC	(Spain) Fernando Verdasco	4	4
(Czech Republic) Radek Štěpánek	6	6

Semifinals
1/WC	(France) Gaël Monfils	6	3	7
11	(United States) John Isner	4	6	6^{6}
(United States) Donald Young	3	3
(Czech Republic) Radek Štěpánek	6	6

Final
1/WC	(France) Gaël Monfils	4	4
(Czech Republic) Radek Štěpánek	6	6

=== WTA – Mercury Insurance Open ===
Vera Zvonareva, Andrea Petkovic, and former world number one, Ana Ivanovic, headlined the event. Sloane Stephens' upset over Julia Görges resulted in the American wildcard being the only unseeded player in the final eight, while Ivanovic's upset over Peng Shuai spoiled a semifinal lineup of the top four seeds. Despite sustaining a shoulder injury earlier in the tournament, Agnieszka Radwańska was able to reach the final for the second consecutive year and defeat top-seed, Zvonareva, for the title.

==== Main Draw Finals ====
Quarterfinals
1	(Russia) Vera Zvonareva	6	3	6
12	(Germany) Sabine Lisicki	3	6	4
4	(China) Peng Shuai	4	2
5	(Serbia) Ana Ivanovic	6	6
8	(Slovakia) Daniela Hantuchová	6	4	4
3	(Poland) Agnieszka Radwańska	0	6	6
WC	(United States) Sloane Stephens	2	1
2	(Germany) Andrea Petković	6	6

Semifinals
1	(Russia) Vera Zvonareva	5	6	6
5	(Serbia) Ana Ivanovic	7	4	4
3	(Poland) Agnieszka Radwańska	4	6	6
2	(Germany) Andrea Petković	6	0	4

Final
1	(Russia) Vera Zvonareva	3	4
3	(Poland) Agnieszka Radwańska	6	6

== Week 4 ==
=== ATP – Rogers Cup ===
Novak Djokovic, Rafael Nadal, Roger Federer, and two-time defending champion, Andy Murray, headlined the event. Murray and Nadal suffered the first upsets of the tournament, with Murray losing badly to South Africa's Kevin Anderson and Nadal falling to Ivan Dodig after the Croat pulled off a comeback win. Federer followed suit, losing in the third round to Jo-Wilfried Tsonga for the second consecutive time in the third round, while Djokovic improved on his win and loss record of the year to 52-1. Atlanta champion and Washington runner-up, Mardy Fish, continued on with his good form on the Series advancing to his third consecutive final. In the final, Djokovic won his 53rd match of the year, defeating Fish 6-4 in the third set.

==== Main Draw Finals ====
Third Round
1	(Serbia) Novak Djokovic	7	6
(Croatia) Marin Čilić	5	2
12	(Serbia) Viktor Troicki	6	6^{0}	6^{5}
5	(France) Gaël Monfils	3	7	7
3	(Switzerland) Roger Federer	6^{3}	6	1
13	(France) Jo-Wilfried Tsonga	7	4	6
10	(France) Richard Gasquet	6^{5}	3
8	(Spain) Nicolás Almagro	7	6
6	(United States) Mardy Fish	4	6	6
WC	(Latvia) Ernests Gulbis	6	3	4
14	(Switzerland) Stanislas Wawrinka	6	4	6
(South Africa) Kevin Anderson	4	6	4
7	(Czech Republic) Tomáš Berdych	6	7^{7}
(Croatia) Ivo Karlović	3	6^{2}
(Serbia) Janko Tipsarević	6	6
(Croatia) Ivan Dodig	1	4

Quarterfinals
1	(Serbia) Novak Djokovic	6	6
5	(France) Gaël Monfils	2	1
13	(France) Jo-Wilfried Tsonga	6	6
8	(Spain) Nicolás Almagro	4	4
6	(United States) Mardy Fish	6	6^{8}	6
14	(Switzerland) Stanislas Wawrinka	3	7	0
7	(Czech Republic) Tomáš Berdych	4	4
(Serbia) Janko Tipsarević	6	6

Semifinals
1	(Serbia) Novak Djokovic	6	3
13	(France) Jo-Wilfried Tsonga	4	0^{r}
6	(United States) Mardy Fish	6	6
(Serbia) Janko Tipsarević	3	4

Final
1	(Serbia) Novak Djokovic	6	3	6
6	(United States) Mardy Fish	2	6	4

=== WTA – Rogers Cup ===
The top 20, including Caroline Wozniacki, Kim Clijsters, and Maria Sharapova, along with Stanford champion, Serena Williams, headlined the event. Despite a long lay-off due to a foot injury, Clijsters was once again forced to retire from her opening round match citing an abdominal injury. The tournament suffered the loss of another headliner early on as defending champion, Wozniacki, was knocked out in the second round. The third round brought about more upsets, as the number three seed, Vera Zvonareva, and Sharapova lost to Agnieszka Radwańska and Galina Voskoboeva, respectively. Despite losing only six games en route to the semifinals, fourth seed, Victoria Azarenka, lost in straight sets to Stanford champion, Williams, who extended her win streak to ten matches. Williams won her second tournament of the Series, defeating Samantha Stosur in the final.

==== Main Draw Finals ====
Third Round
(Italy) Roberta Vinci	7^{7}	6
(Serbia) Ana Ivanovic	6^{3}	2
10	(Australia) Samantha Stosur	6	6
6	(China) Li Na	2	4
3	(Russia) Vera Zvonareva	4	6^{4}
13	(Poland) Agnieszka Radwańska	6	7
11	(Germany) Andrea Petkovic	6	6
7	(Czech Republic) Petra Kvitová	1	2
5	(Russia) Maria Sharapova	3	5
Q	(Kazakhstan) Galina Voskoboeva	6	7
Q	(Spain) María José Martínez Sánchez	1	2
4	(Belarus) Victoria Azarenka	6	6
8	(Italy) Francesca Schiavone	3	3
(Czech Republic) Lucie Šafářová	6	6
(United States) Serena Williams	4	6	6
Q	(China) Zheng Jie	6	3	3

Quarterfinals
(Italy) Roberta Vinci	4	1
10	(Australia) Samantha Stosur	6	6
13	(Poland) Agnieszka Radwańska	6	6
11	(Germany) Andrea Petkovic	4	3
Q	(Kazakhstan) Galina Voskoboeva	1	2
4	(Belarus) Victoria Azarenka	6	6
(Czech Republic) Lucie Šafářová	6	3	2
(United States) Serena Williams	4	6	6

Semifinals
10	(Australia) Samantha Stosur	6	5	6
13	(Poland) Agnieszka Radwańska	2	7	2
4	(Belarus) Victoria Azarenka	3	3
(United States) Serena Williams	6	6

Final
10	(Australia) Samantha Stosur	4	2
(United States) Serena Williams	6	6

== Week 5 ==
=== ATP – Western & Southern Open ===
Montreal champion, Novak Djokovic, Rafael Nadal, defending champion, Roger Federer, and Atlanta champion, Mardy Fish, headlined the event. The top eight seeds cruised to the quarterfinals with exception to fifth-seeded, David Ferrer, who lost his third round match to Gilles Simon. The quarterfinals brought a pair of upsets as former world number ones, Rafael Nadal and Roger Federer, bowed out to Fish and Tomáš Berdych, respectively. Neither player could follow up the win, and instead, Andy Murray handed Djokovic his second loss of the year after the world number one was forced to retire from the championship match.

==== Main Draw Finals ====
Third Round
1	(Serbia) Novak Djokovic	6	6
Q	(Czech Republic) Radek Štěpánek	3	3
(Germany) Philipp Kohlschreiber	2	2
6	(France) Gaël Monfils	6	6
3	(Switzerland) Roger Federer	6	6
WC	(United States) James Blake	4	1
9	(Spain) Nicolás Almagro	2	2
8	(Czech Republic) Tomáš Berdych	6	6
5	(Spain) David Ferrer	4	7^{7}	4
10	(France) Gilles Simon	6	6^{3}	6
Q	(United States) Alex Bogomolov, Jr.	2	5
4	(United Kingdom) Andy Murray	6	7
7	(United States) Mardy Fish	7	7
12	(France) Richard Gasquet	5	5
(Spain) Fernando Verdasco	6^{5}	7^{7}	6^{9}
2	(Spain) Rafael Nadal	7^{7}	6^{4}	7^{11}

Quarterfinals
1	(Serbia) Novak Djokovic	3	6	6
6	(France) Gaël Monfils	6	4	3
3	(Switzerland) Roger Federer	2	6^{3}
8	(Czech Republic) Tomáš Berdych	6	7
10	(France) Gilles Simon	3	3
4	(United Kingdom) Andy Murray	6	6
7	(United States) Mardy Fish	6	6
2	(Spain) Rafael Nadal	3	4

Semifinals
1	(Serbia) Novak Djokovic	7	0
8	(Czech Republic) Tomáš Berdych	5	0^{r}
4	(United Kingdom) Andy Murray	6	7^{10}
7	(United States) Mardy Fish	3	6^{8}

Final
1	(Serbia) Novak Djokovic	4	0^{r}
4	(United Kingdom) Andy Murray	6	3

=== WTA - Western & Southern Open ===
Caroline Wozniacki, Vera Zvonareva, Maria Sharapova, and Stanford and Toronto champion, Serena Williams, headlined the event. Wozniacki lost her opening match for the second tournament in a row, losing to American wildcard, Christina McHale, while Williams was forced to withdraw from the tournament, citing a toe injury. Russians, Zvonareva and Sharapova, advanced to the semifinals without dropping a set, joining lower-seeded players, Andrea Petković and Jelena Janković in the final four. In a battle of former world number ones, Sharapova defeated Janković in a three-set thriller.

==== Main Draw Finals ====
Third Round
WC	(United States) Christina McHale	3	3
(Russia) Nadia Petrova	6	6
9	(Germany) Andrea Petković	6	6
6	(Czech Republic) Petra Kvitová	3	3
(Israel) Shahar Pe'er	3	2
16	(China) Peng Shuai	6	6
13	(Serbia) Jelena Janković	6	5	6
7	(Italy) Francesca Schiavone	3	7	4
5	(China) Li Na	4	6	4
10	(Australia) Samantha Stosur	6	3	6
14	(Russia) Svetlana Kuznetsova	2	3
4/WC	(Russia) Maria Sharapova	6	6
8	(France) Marion Bartoli	3	7	3
(Slovakia) Daniela Hantuchová	6	5	6
Q	(Croatia) Petra Martić	2	2
2	(Russia) Vera Zvonareva	6	6

Quarterfinals
(Russia) Nadia Petrova	5	1
9	(Germany) Andrea Petković	7	6
16	(China) Peng Shuai
13	(Serbia) Jelena Janković	w/o
10	(Australia) Samantha Stosur	3	2
4/WC	(Russia) Maria Sharapova	6	6
(Slovakia) Daniela Hantuchová	3	6^{6}
2	(Russia) Vera Zvonareva	6	7^{8}

Semifinals
9	(Germany) Andrea Petković	6^{4}	1
13	(Serbia) Jelena Janković	7	6
4/WC	(Russia) Maria Sharapova	2	6	6
2	(Russia) Vera Zvonareva	6	3	3

Final
13	(Serbia) Jelena Janković	6	6^{3}	3
4/WC	(Russia) Maria Sharapova	4	7	6

== Week 6 ==
=== ATP - Winston-Salem Open ===
Former world number one, Andy Roddick, and fellow American, John Isner, headlined the event. Where the top half of the draw held to seeds through to the semifinals, the bottom half of the draw saw qualifier, Julien Benneteau, advance to the final. Isner defeated Benneteau to secure a third-place finish in the Series.

==== Main Draw Finals ====
Quarterfinals
1/WC	(United States) Andy Roddick	6	6
7	(Argentina) Juan Mónaco	1	4
4	(United States) John Isner	1	6	6
8	(Cyprus) Marcos Baghdatis	6	3	4
10	(Netherlands) Robin Haase	6	6
3	(Ukraine) Alexandr Dolgopolov	4	4
9	(Ukraine) Sergiy Stakhovsky	6	6^{9}	2
Q	(France) Julien Benneteau	3	7^{11}	6

Semifinals
1/WC	(United States) Andy Roddick	6^{7}	4
4	(United States) John Isner	7^{9}	6
10	(Netherlands) Robin Haase	6	6^{7}	6^{6}
Q	(France) Julien Benneteau	3	7^{9}	7^{8}

Final
4	(United States) John Isner	4	6	6
Q	(France) Julien Benneteau	6	3	4

=== WTA - New Haven Open at Yale ===
Three-time defending champion, Caroline Wozniacki, and French Open finalists, Li Na and Francesca Schiavone, headlined the event. Agnieszka Radwańska had the chance to win the Series if she advanced to the final, but lost to Petra Cetkovská in the second round. Cetkovská's run of good form continued on to the final where she faced world number one, Wozniacki. Wozniacki defeated Cetkovská for a fourth consecutive title in New Haven.

==== Main Draw Finals ====
Quarterfinals
1	(Denmark) Caroline Wozniacki	7	6
WC	(United States) Christina McHale	5	3
3	(Italy) Francesca Schiavone
(Spain) Anabel Medina Garrigues	w	/	o
Q	(Czech Republic) Petra Cetkovská	7	7
4/WC	(France) Marion Bartoli	5	5
8	(Russia) Anastasia Pavlyuchenkova	4	6	2
2/WC	(China) Li Na	6	3	6

Semifinals
1	(Denmark) Caroline Wozniacki	7^{7}	6
3	(Italy) Francesca Schiavone	6^{2}	3
Q	(Czech Republic) Petra Cetkovská	6	5	7^{11}
2/WC	(China) Li Na	2	7	6^{9}

Final
1	(Denmark) Caroline Wozniacki	6	6
Q	(Czech Republic) Petra Cetkovská	4	1
