= 2011 Winston-Salem Open – Doubles =

Doubles
- 2011 Winston-Salem Open

Final
- Champions: (Israel) Jonathan Erlich (Israel) Andy Ram
- Runners-up: (Germany) Christopher Kas (Austria) Alexander Peya
- Score: 7–6^{(7–2)}, 6–4

Events
Singles	Doubles
← 2010 ·	Winston-Salem Open	· 2012 →

Robert Lindstedt and Horia Tecău were the defending champions, but Lindstedt chose not to participate.
Tecău partnered with Lukáš Dlouhý, but were eliminated in the quarterfinals by Santiago González and Jamie Murray.
Jonathan Erlich and Andy Ram won the title, defeating Christopher Kas and Alexander Peya 7–6^{(7–2)}, 6–4 in the final.

== Seeds ==
1. (India) Rohan Bopanna / (Pakistan) Aisam-ul-Haq Qureshi (first round)
2. (Poland) Mariusz Fyrstenberg / (Poland) Marcin Matkowski (first round)
3. (India) Mahesh Bhupathi / (The Bahamas) Mark Knowles (first round)
4. (Germany) Christopher Kas / (Austria) Alexander Peya (final)

== Draw ==
=== Key ===
- Q = Qualifier
- WC = Wild card
- LL = Lucky loser
- Alt = Alternate
- SE = Special exempt
- PR = Protected ranking
- ITF = ITF entry
- JE = Junior exempt
- w/o = Walkover
- r = Retired
- d = Defaulted
- SR = Special ranking

=== Draw ===
First round
1	(India) R Bopanna (Pakistan) A-u-H Qureshi	4	4
(Czech Republic) L Dlouhý (Romania) H Tecău	6	6
(Mexico) S González (United Kingdom) J Murray	7^{7}	7
(Spain) P Andújar (Spain) M López	6^{5}	5
4	(Germany) C Kas (Austria) A Peya	6	7^{7}
(Czech Republic) F Čermák (Slovakia) F Polášek	4	6^{4}
WC	(United States) M Russell (United States) D Young	4	6	[10]
(United States) J Cerretani (Germany) P Marx	6	1	[8]
(Australia) P Hanley (Belgium) D Norman	7	2	[5]
(Brazil) M Melo (Brazil) B Soares	5	6	[10]
(Israel) J Erlich (Israel) A Ram	6	6
3	(India) M Bhupathi (The Bahamas) M Knowles	4	3
(Austria) J Knowle (Austria) O Marach	6^{4}	6^{3}
WC	(Philippines) TC Huey (United States) C Parr	7^{7}	7^{7}
(United Kingdom) C Fleming (United States) S Lipsky	3	7^{7}	[10]
2	(Poland) M Fyrstenberg (Poland) M Matkowski	6	6^{1}	[4]

Quarterfinals
(Czech Republic) L Dlouhý (Romania) H Tecău	5	6	[8]
(Mexico) S González (United Kingdom) J Murray	7	3	[10]
4	(Germany) C Kas (Austria) A Peya	6	6
WC	(United States) M Russell (United States) D Young	2	1
(Brazil) M Melo (Brazil) B Soares	5	4
(Israel) J Erlich (Israel) A Ram	7	6
WC	(Philippines) TC Huey (United States) C Parr	6^{5}	4
(United Kingdom) C Fleming (United States) S Lipsky	7^{7}	6

Semifinals
(Mexico) S González (United Kingdom) J Murray	6^{3}	3
4	(Germany) C Kas (Austria) A Peya	7^{7}	6
(Israel) J Erlich (Israel) A Ram	6	6
(United Kingdom) C Fleming (United States) S Lipsky	4	4

Final
4	(Germany) C Kas (Austria) A Peya	6^{2}	4
(Israel) J Erlich (Israel) A Ram	7^{7}	6
