= 2011 New Haven Open at Yale – Singles qualifying =

This article shows the Qualifying Draw for the 2011 New Haven Open at Yale.

== Players ==
=== Seeds ===
1. (Spain) María José Martínez Sánchez (first round, retired)
2. (Czech Republic) Petra Cetkovská (qualified)
3. (Russia) Ksenia Pervak (qualified)
4. (France) Mathilde Johansson (second round)
5. (Russia) Vera Dushevina (qualified)
6. (Spain) Laura Pous Tió (first round)
7. (Spain) Carla Suárez Navarro (qualifying competition) (lucky loser)
8. (Russia) Evgeniya Rodina (first round, retired)

== Qualifiers ==
1. (Russia) Vera Dushevina
2. (Czech Republic) Petra Cetkovská
3. (Russia) Ksenia Pervak
4. (Australia) Anastasia Rodionova

== Lucky losers ==
1. (Spain) Carla Suárez Navarro

== Qualifying draw ==
=== First qualifier ===
First round
1	(Spain) María José Martínez Sánchez	2	1^{r}
(Spain) Nuria Llagostera Vives	6	2
(Greece) Eleni Daniilidou	3	1
(United States) Sloane Stephens	6	6
WC	(United States) Allie Will	7^{11}	2	3
(Spain) Arantxa Parra Santonja	6^{9}	6	6
WC	(United States) Asia Muhammed	4	3
5	(Russia) Vera Dushevina	6	6

Second round
(Spain) Nuria Llagostera Vives	6^{2}	2
(United States) Sloane Stephens	7^{7}	6
(Spain) Arantxa Parra Santonja	1	3
5	(Russia) Vera Dushevina	6	6

Qualifying competition
(United States) Sloane Stephens	6	2	0
5	(Russia) Vera Dushevina	4	6	6

=== Second qualifier ===
First round
2	(Czech Republic) Petra Cetkovská	6	6
WC	(United States) Chieh-Yu Hsu	2	0
(United Kingdom) Heather Watson	6	6
(Japan) Misaki Doi	4	2
(Romania) Edina Gallovits-Hall	6	6
(United States) Varvara Lepchenko	4	4
(Germany) Kristina Barrois	6	3	0
7	(Spain) Carla Suárez Navarro	3	6	6

Second round
2	(Czech Republic) Petra Cetkovská	6	6
(United Kingdom) Heather Watson	1	1
(Romania) Edina Gallovits-Hall	6	2	1
7	(Spain) Carla Suárez Navarro	1	6	6

Qualifying competition
2	(Czech Republic) Petra Cetkovská	6	6
7	(Spain) Carla Suárez Navarro	2	0

=== Third qualifier ===
First round
3	(Russia) Ksenia Pervak	6	6
(Slovakia) Zuzana Kučová	3	1
(Austria) Patricia Mayr-Achleitner	7	3
(Ukraine) Lesya Tsurenko	5	2^{r}
(United Kingdom) Anne Keothavong	0	3
(Poland) Urszula Radwańska	6	6
(Spain) Silvia Soler-Espinosa	7^{7}	0	7
6	(Spain) Laura Pous Tió	6^{4}	6	5

Second round
3	(Russia) Ksenia Pervak	6	6
(Austria) Patricia Mayr-Achleitner	3	3
(Poland) Urszula Radwańska	6	6
(Spain) Silvia Soler-Espinosa	1	4

Qualifying competition
3	(Russia) Ksenia Pervak	5
(Poland) Urszula Radwańska	0^{r}

=== Fourth qualifier ===
First round
4	(France) Mathilde Johansson	7	6^{4}	6
(United States) Alison Riske	5	7^{7}	4
(Belarus) Olga Govortsova	6	6
(Italy) Maria Elena Camerin	4	1
(Czech Republic) Renata Voráčová	6	5	1
(Australia) Anastasia Rodionova	3	7	6
WC	(United States) Robin Anderson	6	4
8	(Russia) Evgeniya Rodina	2	2^{r}

Second round
4	(France) Mathilde Johansson	4	2
(Belarus) Olga Govortsova	6	6
(Australia) Anastasia Rodionova	6	7
WC	(United States) Robin Anderson	0	5

Qualifying competition
(Belarus) Olga Govortsova	6	2	4
(Australia) Anastasia Rodionova	2	6	6
