= 2012 Winston-Salem Open – Singles =

Singles
- 2012 Winston-Salem Open

Final
- Champion: (United States) John Isner
- Runner-up: (Czech Republic) Tomáš Berdych
- Score: 3–6, 6–4, 7–6^{(11–9)}

Events
Singles	Doubles
← 2011 ·	Winston-Salem Open	· 2013 →

John Isner successfully defended his title by beating Tomáš Berdych 3–6, 6–4, 7–6^{(11–9)} in the final.

== Seeds ==
All seeds received a bye into the second round.

1. (France) Jo-Wilfried Tsonga (semifinals)
2. (Czech Republic) Tomáš Berdych (final)
3. (United States) John Isner (champion)
4. (Ukraine) Alexandr Dolgopolov (quarterfinals)
5. (United States) Andy Roddick (third round)
6. (Spain) Marcel Granollers (quarterfinals)
7. (United States) Sam Querrey (semifinals)
8. (France) Julien Benneteau (second round)
9. (Spain) Feliciano López (third round)
10. (Serbia) Viktor Troicki (second round)
11. (Uzbekistan) Denis Istomin (second round)
12. (South Africa) Kevin Anderson (second round)
13. (Austria) Jürgen Melzer (third round)
14. (Argentina) David Nalbandian (third round)
15. (Spain) Pablo Andújar (second round)
16. (Finland) Jarkko Nieminen (third round)

== Draw ==
=== Key ===
- Q = Qualifier
- WC = Wild card
- LL = Lucky loser
- Alt = Alternate
- SE = Special exempt
- PR = Protected ranking
- ITF = ITF entry
- JE = Junior exempt
- w/o = Walkover
- r = Retired
- d = Defaulted
- SR = Special ranking

=== Finals ===
Quarterfinals
1	(France) Jo-Wilfried Tsonga	6	6
6	(Spain) Marcel Granollers	1	2
3	(United States) John Isner	7^{7}	6
(Belgium) David Goffin	6^{5}	3
7	(United States) Sam Querrey	7	4	7^{7}
4	(Ukraine) Alexandr Dolgopolov	5	6	6^{3}
(Belgium) Steve Darcis	6	2	0
2/WC	(Czech Republic) Tomáš Berdych	4	6	6

Semifinals
1	(France) Jo-Wilfried Tsonga	4	6	6^{3}
3	(United States) John Isner	6	3	7^{7}
7	(United States) Sam Querrey	4	3
2/WC	(Czech Republic) Tomáš Berdych	6	6

Final
3	(United States) John Isner	3	6	7^{11}
2/WC	(Czech Republic) Tomáš Berdych	6	4	6^{9}

=== Top half ===
==== Section 1 ====
First round
(Brazil) T Bellucci	7	3
(Cyprus) M Baghdatis	5	1^{r}
(Luxembourg) G Müller	6^{4}	4
Q	(Ukraine) S Stakhovsky	7^{7}	6
Q	(Latvia) E Gulbis	6	7
(Argentina) C Berlocq	4	5
(Japan) G Soeda	3	5
WC	(United States) R Harrison	6	7

Second round
1	(France) J-W Tsonga	6	7^{7}
(Brazil) T Bellucci	3	6^{3}
Q	(Ukraine) S Stakhovsky	6	6
15	(Spain) P Andújar	2	3
12	(South Africa) K Anderson	4	6^{2}
Q	(Latvia) E Gulbis	6	7^{7}
WC	(United States) R Harrison	4	2
6	(Spain) M Granollers	6	6

Third round
1	(France) J-W Tsonga	7^{7}	6
Q	(Ukraine) S Stakhovsky	6^{1}	4
Q	(Latvia) E Gulbis	6	3	2
6	(Spain) M Granollers	4	6	6

Quarterfinals
1	(France) J-W Tsonga	6	6
6	(Spain) M Granollers	1	2

==== Section 2 ====
First round
(France) B Paire	2	6^{4}
(Slovakia) M Kližan	6	7^{7}
(Colombia) A Falla	1	4
Q	(United States) M McClune	6	6
(Belgium) D Goffin	7^{7}	6
(France) N Mahut	6^{3}	1
PR	(Spain) T Robredo	1	6	2
(Poland) Ł Kubot	6	2	6

Second round
3	(United States) J Isner	4	6	7
(Slovakia) M Kližan	6	3	5
Q	(United States) M McClune	2	6	6^{10}
13	(Austria) J Melzer	6	2	7^{12}
10	(Serbia) V Troicki	6	4	5
(Belgium) D Goffin	3	6	7
(Poland) Ł Kubot	2	7	6
8	(France) J Benneteau	6	5	3

Third round
3	(United States) J Isner	6	6
13	(Austria) J Melzer	4	3
(Belgium) D Goffin	6	1	7^{7}
(Poland) Ł Kubot	3	6	6^{5}

Quarterfinals
3	(United States) J Isner	7^{7}	6
(Belgium) D Goffin	6^{5}	3

=== Bottom half ===
==== Section 3 ====
First round
(Colombia) S Giraldo	6	2	6
(France) É Roger-Vasselin	2	6	1
(United States) D Young	4	6	6
(Argentina) L Mayer	6	3	2
(Russia) N Davydenko	2	3
(Netherlands) R Haase	6	6
(Chinese Taipei) Y-h Lu	6	7^{7}
(Slovakia) L Lacko	3	6^{3}

Second round
7	(United States) S Querrey	6	6
(Colombia) S Giraldo	3	2
(United States) D Young	2	3
9	(Spain) F López	6	6
14/WC	(Argentina) D Nalbandian	6	6
(Netherlands) R Haase	2	4
(Chinese Taipei) Y-h Lu	1	3
4	(Ukraine) A Dolgopolov	6	6

Third round
7	(United States) S Querrey	6	6
9	(Spain) F López	3	4
14/WC	(Argentina) D Nalbandian	3	4
4	(Ukraine) A Dolgopolov	6	6

Quarterfinals
7	(United States) S Querrey	7	4	7^{7}
4	(Ukraine) A Dolgopolov	5	6	6^{3}

==== Section 4 ====
First round
WC	(United States) J Blake	6	6
(Spain) A Ramos	4	3
(Belgium) X Malisse	3	0
(Belgium) S Darcis	6	6
(Japan) T Ito	3	6	2
Q	(Germany) B Becker	6	4	6
(Russia) A Bogomolov Jr.	6	6
(Tunisia) M Jaziri	2	2

Second round
5	(United States) A Roddick	7^{8}	7^{8}
WC	(United States) J Blake	6^{6}	6^{6}
(Belgium) S Darcis	6	6
11	(Uzbekistan) D Istomin	2	2
16	(Finland) J Nieminen	6	6
Q	(Germany) B Becker	3	3
(Russia) A Bogomolov Jr.	3	5
2/WC	(Czech Republic) T Berdych	6	7

Third round
5	(United States) A Roddick	6^{6}	6^{3}
(Belgium) S Darcis	7^{8}	7^{7}
16	(Finland) J Nieminen	3	2
2/WC	(Czech Republic) T Berdych	6	6

Quarterfinals
(Belgium) S Darcis	6	2	0
2/WC	(Czech Republic) T Berdych	4	6	6

== Qualifying ==
=== Seeds ===
1. (Australia) Matthew Ebden (second round, retired because of an illness)
2. (Estonia) Jürgen Zopp (first round)
3. (France) Michaël Llodra (second round)
4. (Poland) Jerzy Janowicz (qualifying competition)
5. (Germany) Benjamin Becker (qualified)
6. (Germany) Cedrik-Marcel Stebe (first round)
7. (Ukraine) Sergiy Stakhovsky (qualified)
8. (France) Guillaume Rufin (second round)

=== Qualifiers ===
1. (Ukraine) Sergiy Stakhovsky
2. (United States) Michael McClune
3. (Germany) Benjamin Becker
4. (Latvia) Ernests Gulbis

=== Draw ===
==== First qualifier ====
First round
1	(Australia) Matthew Ebden	6	7^{7}
WC	(United States) David Hopkins	3	6^{5}
(India) Sanam Singh	2	6	6
(Colombia) Juan Sebastián Cabal	6	1	1
WC	(United States) John Harrison Richmond	3	6	6
WC	(India) Amogh Prabhakar	6	4	1
(Denmark) Frederik Nielsen	3	2
7	(Ukraine) Sergiy Stakhovsky	6	6

Second round
1	(Australia) Matthew Ebden	6^{3}	2^{r}
(India) Sanam Singh	7^{7}	5
WC	(United States) John Harrison Richmond	1	4
7	(Ukraine) Sergiy Stakhovsky	6	6

Qualifying competition
(India) Sanam Singh	7^{10}	3	3
7	(Ukraine) Sergiy Stakhovsky	6^{8}	6	6

==== Second qualifier ====
First round
2	(Estonia) Jürgen Zopp	4	6^{8}
(United States) Jack Sock	6	7^{10}
(United States) Jesse Witten	3	4
(South Africa) Fritz Wolmarans	6	6
(United States) Michael McClune	6	7
(United States) Jeff Dadamo	3	5
(New Zealand) Michael Venus	3	2
8	(France) Guillaume Rufin	6	6

Second round
(United States) Jack Sock	7^{7}	7^{7}
(South Africa) Fritz Wolmarans	6^{3}	6^{2}
(United States) Michael McClune	6	7^{7}
8	(France) Guillaume Rufin	2	6^{2}

Qualifying competition
(United States) Jack Sock	3	3
(United States) Michael McClune	6	6

==== Third qualifier ====
First round
3	(France) Michaël Llodra	6	6
(United States) Phillip Simmonds	1	4
(Australia) Chris Guccione	6	7^{7}
(Russia) Teymuraz Gabashvili	4	6^{3}
WC	(United States) Eric Quigley	7	6
(Slovenia) Luka Gregorc	5	2
(India) Somdev Devvarman	2	0
5	(Germany) Benjamin Becker	6	6

Second round
3	(France) Michaël Llodra	6^{3}	7^{7}	3
(Australia) Chris Guccione	7^{7}	6^{5}	6
WC	(United States) Eric Quigley	4	3
5	(Germany) Benjamin Becker	6	6

Qualifying competition
(Australia) Chris Guccione	3	6	3
5	(Germany) Benjamin Becker	6	3	6

==== Fourth qualifier ====
First round
4	(Poland) Jerzy Janowicz	7^{11}	7
(United States) Austin Krajicek	6^{9}	5
(United States) Blake Strode	2	5
(United States) Devin Britton	6	7
(Austria) Dominic Thiem	4	3
(Latvia) Ernests Gulbis	6	6
(Canada) Pierre-Ludovic Duclos	5	7^{7}	6
6	(Germany) Cedrik-Marcel Stebe	7	6^{3}	4

Second round
4	(Poland) Jerzy Janowicz	6	7^{7}
(United States) Devin Britton	3	6^{4}
(Latvia) Ernests Gulbis	6	6
(Canada) Pierre-Ludovic Duclos	4	4

Qualifying competition
4	(Poland) Jerzy Janowicz	7	2	3
(Latvia) Ernests Gulbis	5	6	6
