= 2011 Winston-Salem Open – Singles =

Singles
- 2011 Winston-Salem Open

Final
- Champion: (United States) John Isner
- Runner-up: (France) Julien Benneteau
- Score: 4–6, 6–3, 6–4

Events
Singles	Doubles
← 2010 ·	Winston-Salem Open	· 2012 →

Sergiy Stakhovsky was the defending champion, but lost to Julien Benneteau in the quarterfinals. John Isner defeated Benneteau in the final, 4–6, 6–3, 6–4.

== Seeds ==
All seeds received a bye into the second round.

1. (United States) Andy Roddick (semifinals)
2. (Austria) Jürgen Melzer (second round)
3. (Ukraine) Alexandr Dolgopolov (quarterfinals)
4. (United States) John Isner (champion)
5. (Russia) Nikolay Davydenko (third round)
6. (South Africa) Kevin Anderson (withdrew due to illness)
7. (Argentina) Juan Mónaco (quarterfinals)
8. (Cyprus) Marcos Baghdatis (quarterfinals)
9. (Ukraine) Sergiy Stakhovsky (quarterfinals)
10. (Netherlands) Robin Haase (semifinals)
11. (Russia) Dmitry Tursunov (second round)
12. (Spain) Pablo Andújar (second round)
13. (Finland) Jarkko Nieminen (third round)
14. (Bulgaria) Grigor Dimitrov (third round)
15. (Colombia) Santiago Giraldo (third round)
16. (Russia) Igor Kunitsyn (second round)

== Draw ==
=== Key ===
- Q = Qualifier
- WC = Wild card
- LL = Lucky loser
- Alt = Alternate
- SE = Special exempt
- PR = Protected ranking
- ITF = ITF entry
- JE = Junior exempt
- w/o = Walkover
- r = Retired
- d = Defaulted
- SR = Special ranking

=== Finals ===
Quarterfinals
1/WC	(United States) Andy Roddick	6	6
7	(Argentina) Juan Mónaco	1	4
4	(United States) John Isner	1	6	6
8	(Cyprus) Marcos Baghdatis	6	3	4
10	(Netherlands) Robin Haase	6	6
3	(Ukraine) Alexandr Dolgopolov	4	4
9	(Ukraine) Sergiy Stakhovsky	6	6^{9}	2
Q	(France) Julien Benneteau	3	7^{11}	6

Semifinals
1/WC	(United States) Andy Roddick	6^{7}	4
4	(United States) John Isner	7^{9}	6
10	(Netherlands) Robin Haase	6	6^{7}	6^{6}
Q	(France) Julien Benneteau	3	7^{9}	7^{8}

Final
4	(United States) John Isner	4	6	6
Q	(France) Julien Benneteau	6	3	4

=== Top half ===
==== Section 1 ====
First round
LL	(France) É Roger-Vasselin	7^{7}	2	7^{7}
(Czech Republic) L Rosol	6^{5}	6	6^{4}
(Slovenia) B Kavčič	6	7^{7}
WC	(Australia) L Hewitt	4	6^{3}
Q	(Japan) K Nishikori	1	6	7^{7}
(Luxembourg) G Müller	6	4	6^{5}
(Germany) T Kamke	6	6
(Colombia) A Falla	1	0

Second round
1/WC	(United States) A Roddick	6	6
LL	(France) É Roger-Vasselin	2	4
(Slovenia) B Kavčič	2	3
15	(Colombia) S Giraldo	6	6
12	(Spain) P Andújar	6^{3}	2
Q	(Japan) K Nishikori	7^{7}	6
(Germany) T Kamke	5	0
7	(Argentina) J Mónaco	7	6

Third round
1/WC	(United States) A Roddick	6	6
15	(Colombia) S Giraldo	1	3
Q	(Japan) K Nishikori	0	3
7	(Argentina) J Mónaco	6	6

Quarterfinals
1/WC	(United States) A Roddick	6	6
7	(Argentina) J Mónaco	1	4

==== Section 2 ====
First round
(Israel) D Sela	6	6
(Italy) F Volandri	3	2
(Uzbekistan) D Istomin	7^{7}	6
(Germany) M Bachinger	6^{1}	1
(Belgium) S Darcis	3	6	6
(Portugal) F Gil	6	3	4
(United States) R Sweeting	6	7
(Belgium) O Rochus	3	5

Second round
4	(United States) J Isner	7^{7}	6
(Israel) D Sela	6^{3}	2
(Uzbekistan) D Istomin	6	4	4
13	(Finland) J Nieminen	3	6	6
11	(Russia) D Tursunov	6	1	3
(Belgium) S Darcis	3	6	6
(United States) R Sweeting	5	1
8	(Cyprus) M Baghdatis	7	6

Third round
4	(United States) J Isner	7^{7}	6
13	(Finland) J Nieminen	6^{4}	2
(Belgium) S Darcis	5	0
8	(Cyprus) M Baghdatis	7	6

Quarterfinals
4	(United States) J Isner	1	6	6
8	(Cyprus) M Baghdatis	6	3	4

=== Bottom half ===
==== Section 3 ====
First round
(Romania) V Hănescu	6	3	4
WC	(United States) R Harrison	1	6	6
(Kazakhstan) M Kukushkin	5	1
(United States) J Blake	7	6
WC	(United States) D Young	6	6
(Germany) M Berrer	3	4
(Argentina) C Berlocq	7	4
(Austria) A Haider-Maurer	5	1^{r}

Second round
LL	(Canada) P-L Duclos	7	7
WC	(United States) R Harrison	5	5
(United States) J Blake	4	1
10	(Netherlands) R Haase	6	6
14	(Bulgaria) G Dimitrov	6	2	7^{7}
WC	(United States) D Young	4	6	6^{2}
(Argentina) C Berlocq	4	4
3	(Ukraine) A Dolgopolov	6	6

Third round
LL	(Canada) P-L Duclos	4	5
10	(Netherlands) R Haase	6	7
14	(Bulgaria) G Dimitrov	4	6	6^{7}
3	(Ukraine) A Dolgopolov	6	1	7^{9}

Quarterfinals
10	(Netherlands) R Haase	6	6
3	(Ukraine) A Dolgopolov	4	4

==== Section 4 ====
First round
Q	(United States) M Russell	6	6^{3}	6
(France) A Mannarino	4	7^{7}	2
(Kazakhstan) A Golubev	6	4	6
(Argentina) M González	2	6	4
Q	(Brazil) R Mello	1	3
Q	(France) J Benneteau	6	6
(Australia) B Tomic	7^{7}	3	4
(Russia) I Andreev	6^{5}	6	6

Second round
5	(Russia) N Davydenko	6	6
Q	(United States) M Russell	2	2
(Kazakhstan) A Golubev	1	6	4
9	(Ukraine) S Stakhovsky	6	2	6
16	(Russia) I Kunitsyn	3	1
Q	(France) J Benneteau	6	6
(Russia) I Andreev	7	6
2	(Austria) J Melzer	5	3

Third round
5	(Russia) N Davydenko	4	4
9	(Ukraine) S Stakhovsky	6	6
Q	(France) J Benneteau	2	6	7^{7}
(Russia) I Andreev	6	1	6^{5}

Quarterfinals
9	(Ukraine) S Stakhovsky	6	6^{9}	2
Q	(France) J Benneteau	3	7^{11}	6
