= Cory Parr =

American tennis player

- Country (sports): United States
- Residence: New York
- Born: 2 November 1987 (age 39) Jericho, United States
- Height: 6’0
- Turned pro: 2009
- Plays: Left-handed (two-handed backhand)
- College: Wake Forest University

Singles
- Career record: 0–0 (at ATP Tour level, Grand Slam level, and in Davis Cup)
- Career titles: 0 ITF
- Highest ranking: No. 779 (7 June 2010)

Doubles
- Career record: 1–1 (at ATP Tour level, Grand Slam level, and in Davis Cup)
- Career titles: 15 ITF
- Highest ranking: No. 272 (5 July 2010)
- Last updated on: 20 February 2017.

Cory Parr (born 2 November 1987) is a retired American tennis player.

Parr has a career high ATP singles ranking of 779 achieved on 7 June 2010. He also has a career high ATP doubles ranking of 272 achieved on 5 July 2010. He won 15 professional futures doubles titles with multiple partners.

Parr made his ATP main draw debut at the 2011 Winston-Salem Open in the doubles draw, partnering with Treat Huey.

Parr was a three time All American at Wake Forest University. He (along with partner Steven Forman) won the program's first ever national championship with a win at the 2008 ITA National Indoor tournament. He reached as high as number 9 in the national singles rankings in 2009. In 2009, Parr also reached the number 1 spot in the college tennis national doubles rankings. He currently holds the most wins in program history in both singles and doubles. In 2017, Parr rejoined the program as a volunteer assistant coach shortly after the enrollment of his juniors pupil, Sean Patrick Hannity. In 2020 Parr completed his master's in Business Administration at Wake Forest University. In 2023 Parr was inducted into the Wake Forest sports hall of fame.
