= 2012 Winston-Salem Open – Doubles =

Doubles
- 2012 Winston-Salem Open

Final
- Champions: (Mexico) Santiago González (United States) Scott Lipsky
- Runners-up: (Spain) Pablo Andújar (Argentina) Leonardo Mayer
- Score: 6–3, 4–6, [10–2]

Events
Singles	Doubles
← 2011 ·	Winston-Salem Open	· 2013 →

Jonathan Erlich and Andy Ram were the defending champions, but they lost to Pablo Andújar and Leonardo Mayer in the semifinals.
Santiago González and Scott Lipsky won the title, defeating Andújar and Mayer 6–3, 4–6, [10–2] in the final.

== Seeds ==
1. (India) Rohan Bopanna / (Poland) Mariusz Fyrstenberg (quarterfinals)
2. (United Kingdom) Jonathan Marray / (Denmark) Frederik Nielsen (first round)
3. (United Kingdom) Colin Fleming / (United Kingdom) Ross Hutchins (first round)
4. (France) Michaël Llodra / (France) Nicolas Mahut (first round, retired because of a knee injury for Mahut)

== Draw ==
=== Key ===
- Q = Qualifier
- WC = Wild card
- LL = Lucky loser
- Alt = Alternate
- SE = Special exempt
- PR = Protected ranking
- ITF = ITF entry
- JE = Junior exempt
- w/o = Walkover
- r = Retired
- d = Defaulted
- SR = Special ranking

=== Draw ===
First round
1	(India) R Bopanna (Poland) M Fyrstenberg	6	6^{4}	[10]
(United States) E Butorac (Australia) P Hanley	4	7^{7}	[3]
(Russia) M Elgin (Uzbekistan) D Istomin	4	4
Alt	(Spain) P Andújar (Argentina) L Mayer	6	6
4	(France) M Llodra (France) N Mahut	6	1^{r}
(Colombia) JS Cabal (Colombia) A Falla	1	1
WC	(Israel) J Erlich (Israel) A Ram	6	7^{12}
(Philippines) TC Huey (United Kingdom) D Inglot	3	6^{10}
(Austria) A Peya (Brazil) B Soares	2	2
(Austria) J Knowle (Slovakia) F Polášek	6	6
(Mexico) S González (United States) S Lipsky	7^{9}	7^{7}
3	(United Kingdom) C Fleming (United Kingdom) R Hutchins	6^{7}	6^{3}
(Austria) J Melzer (France) É Roger-Vasselin	6	6
(Czech Republic) F Čermák (United Kingdom) J Murray	4	4
(Spain) D Marrero (Brazil) A Sá	6	7^{7}
2	(United Kingdom) J Marray (Denmark) F Nielsen	3	6^{3}

Quarterfinals
1	(India) R Bopanna (Poland) M Fyrstenberg	7^{8}	6^{4}	[4]
Alt	(Spain) P Andújar (Argentina) L Mayer	6^{6}	7^{7}	[10]
(Colombia) JS Cabal (Colombia) A Falla	3	5
WC	(Israel) J Erlich (Israel) A Ram	6	7
(Austria) J Knowle (Slovakia) F Polášek	1	6	[11]
(Mexico) S González (United States) S Lipsky	6	3	[13]
(Austria) J Melzer (France) É Roger-Vasselin	6	5	[8]
(Spain) D Marrero (Brazil) A Sá	1	7	[10]

Semifinals
Alt	(Spain) P Andújar (Argentina) L Mayer	6	6
WC	(Israel) J Erlich (Israel) A Ram	2	1
(Mexico) S González (United States) S Lipsky	6	6
(Spain) D Marrero (Brazil) A Sá	4	1

Final
Alt	(Spain) P Andújar (Argentina) L Mayer	3	6	[2]
(Mexico) S González (United States) S Lipsky	6	4	[10]
