= 2011 Mercury Insurance Open =

- Date: August 1–7
- Edition: 31st
- Category: WTA Premier tournaments
- Draw: 56S / 16D
- Prize money: $721,000
- Surface: Hard / outdoor
- Location: Carlsbad, California, US

Champions

Singles
- (Poland) Agnieszka Radwańska

Doubles
- (Czech Republic) Květa Peschke / (Slovenia) Katarina Srebotnik
- Southern California Open

The 2011 Mercury Insurance Open was a women's tennis tournament played on outdoor hard courts. It is the 2nd edition of the Southern California Open since the tournament left the tour in 2007. It is classified as one of the WTA Premier tournaments of the 2011 WTA Tour. It takes place in Carlsbad, California, United States. Petra Kvitova and Kim Clijsters withdrew due to injuries. Third-seeded Agnieszka Radwańska won the singles title.

== Finals ==
=== Singles ===
(Poland) Agnieszka Radwańska defeated (Russia) Vera Zvonareva 6–3, 6–4.

- It was Radwańska's first title of the year and fifth overall.

=== Doubles ===
(Czech Republic) Květa Peschke / (Slovenia) Katarina Srebotnik defeated (United States) Raquel Kops-Jones / (United States) Abigail Spears 6–0, 6–2

== Entrants ==
=== Seeds ===
Nation	Player	Ranking*	Seed
RUS	Vera Zvonareva	3	1
GER	Andrea Petkovic	11	2
POL	Agnieszka Radwańska	14	3
CHN	Peng Shuai	16	4
SRB	Ana Ivanovic	17	5
SVK	Dominika Cibulková	19	6
GER	Julia Görges	20	7
SVK	Daniela Hantuchová	21	8
ITA	Roberta Vinci	22	9
ITA	Flavia Pennetta	23	10
RUS	Maria Kirilenko	25	11
GER	Sabine Lisicki	26	12
AUS	Jarmila Gajdošová	28	13
RUS	Elena Vesnina	33	14
ITA	Sara Errani	36	15
SLO	Polona Hercog	39	16

- Seedings are based on the rankings of July 25, 2011.

=== Other entrants ===
The following players received wildcards into the singles main draw

- (Argentina) Gisela Dulko
- (United States) Alexa Glatch
- (France) Aravane Rezaï
- (United States) Sloane Stephens

The following players received entry from the qualifying draw:

- (Hungary) Gréta Arn
- (United States) Jill Craybas
- (New Zealand) Marina Erakovic
- (South Africa) Natalie Grandin
- (Japan) Rika Fujiwara
- (Canada) Marie-Ève Pelletier
- (United States) Zoë Gwen Scandalis
- (United States) Ashley Weinhold

The following player received entry as a lucky loser into the singles main draw:

- (Ukraine) Olga Savchuk

Preceded by Stanford; Washington, D.C.	2011 US Open Series Women's Events	Succeeded by Toronto
