= 2011 Western & Southern Open =

- Date: August 15–21
- Edition: 110th (men) / 83rd (women)
- Surface: Hard / Outdoor
- Location: Mason, Ohio, United States
- Venue: Lindner Family Tennis Center

Champions

Men's singles
- (United Kingdom) Andy Murray

Women's singles
- (Russia) Maria Sharapova

Men's doubles
- (India) Leander Paes / (India) Mahesh Bhupathi

Women's doubles
- (United States) Vania King / (Kazakhstan) Yaroslava Shvedova
- Cincinnati Masters

The 2011 Western & Southern Open, also known as the Cincinnati Open, was a tennis tournament played on outdoor hard courts at the Lindner Family Tennis Center in Mason, Ohio, United States. The tournament was a joint men's and women's event, with six new courts being built for the tournament. The competition took place from August 15 through August 21, 2011. The 110th edition of the Cincinnati Open (83rd for the women), it was a Masters 1000 event on the 2011 ATP World Tour, and part of the Premier Series of the 2011 WTA Tour.

On an additional note, Andy Murray during his semifinal match against Mardy Fish set the record for the fastest ever hit forehand at 124 mph (200 km/h).

== Points and prize money ==
=== Point distribution ===
Stage	Men's singles	Men's doubles	Women's singles	Women's doubles
Champion	1000		900	
Runner up	600		620	
Semifinals	360		395	
Quarterfinals	180		225	
Round of 16	90		125	
Round of 32	45	10	70	1
Round of 64	10	–	1	–
Qualifier	25	–	30	–
Qualifying Finalist	16	–	12	–
Qualifying 1st round	-	–	1	–

=== Prize money ===
Stage	Men's singles	Men's doubles	Women's singles	Women's doubles
Champion	$496,000	$140,000	$360,000	$100,000
Runner up	$243,200	$70,000	$180,000	$50,000
Semifinals	$122,400	$35,500	$90,000	$25,000
Quarterfinals	$62,240	$18,470	$41,450	$12,500
Round of 16	$32,320	$9,690	$20,550	$6,250
Round of 32	$17,040	$5,090	$10,575	$3,170
Round of 64	$9,200	–	$5,500	–
Final round qualifying	$2,120	–	$1,995	–
First round qualifying	$1,080	–	$1,035	–

== ATP entrants ==
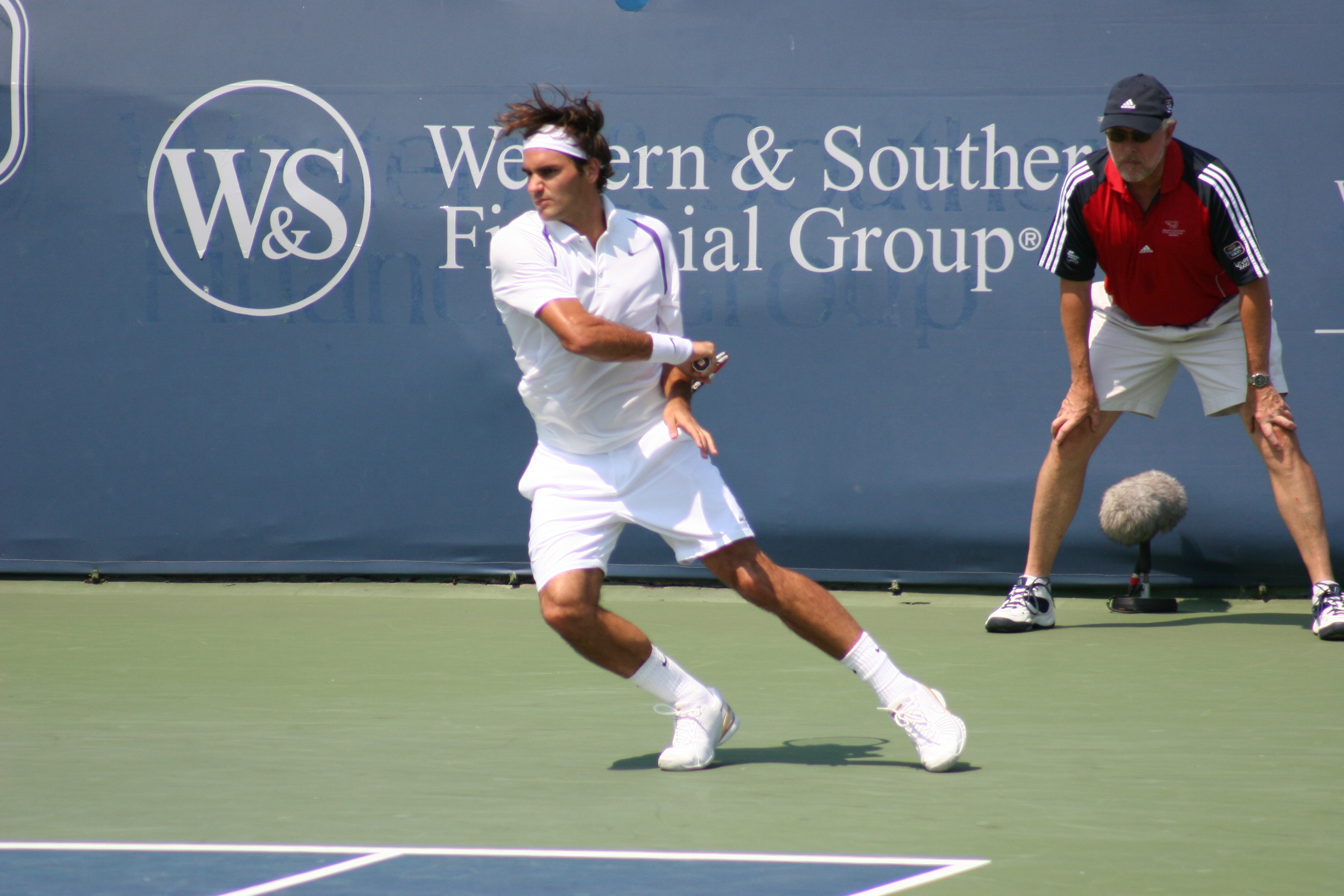
In 2011, Roger Federer failed to defend the men's singles title he won in 2010

=== Seeds ===
Country	Player	Rank^{[a]}	Seed^{[b]}
SRB	Novak Djokovic	1	1
ESP	Rafael Nadal	2	2
SUI	Roger Federer	3	3
GBR	Andy Murray	4	4
ESP	David Ferrer	6	5
FRA	Gaël Monfils	7	6
USA	Mardy Fish	8	7
CZE	Tomáš Berdych	9	8
ESP	Nicolás Almagro	10	9
FRA	Gilles Simon	11	10
USA	Andy Roddick	12	11
FRA	Richard Gasquet	13	12
RUS	Mikhail Youzhny	14	13
SRB	Viktor Troicki	15	14
FRA	Jo-Wilfried Tsonga	16	15
SUI	Stanislas Wawrinka	17	16

- Seedings are based on the rankings of August 8, 2011.

=== Other entrants ===
The following players received wildcards into the singles main draw:

- (United States) James Blake
- (Bulgaria) Grigor Dimitrov
- (United States) Robby Ginepri
- (United States) Ryan Harrison

The following players received entry from the qualifying draw:

- (France) Julien Benneteau
- (United States) Alex Bogomolov Jr.
- (Latvia) Ernests Gulbis
- (Turkey) Marsel İlhan
- (Japan) Kei Nishikori
- (France) Édouard Roger-Vasselin
- (Czech Republic) Radek Štěpánek

=== Withdrawals ===
- (Australia) Lleyton Hewitt
- (Croatia) Ivan Ljubičić
- (Canada) Milos Raonic
- (Spain) Tommy Robredo
- (Sweden) Robin Söderling (wrist injury)

== WTA entrants ==
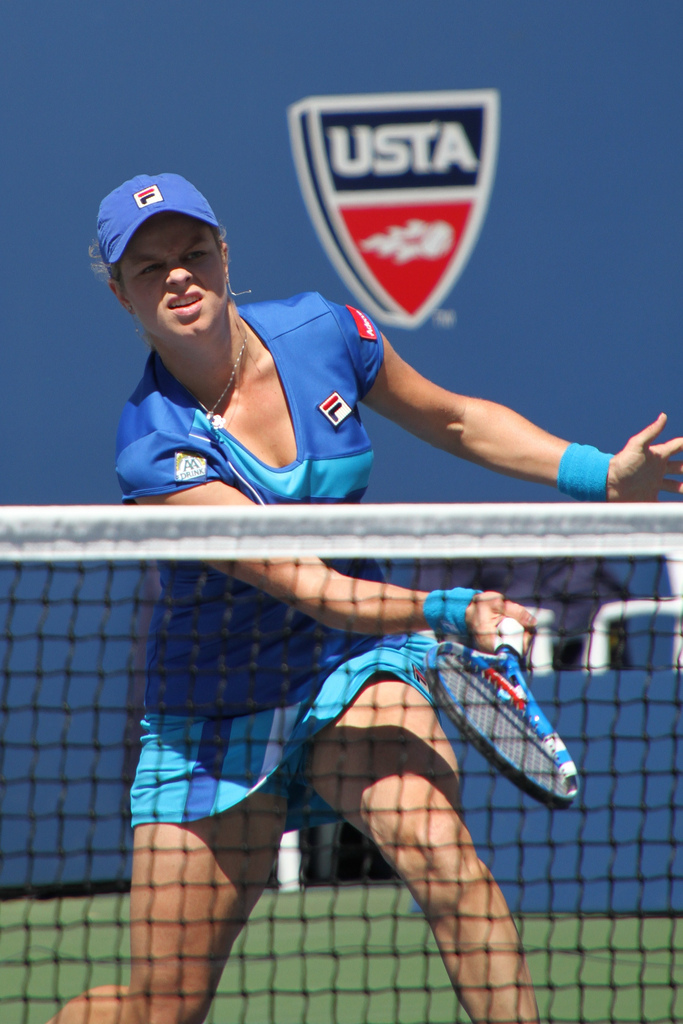
Kim Clijsters was the women's defending champion but was unable to defend her title due to abdominal injury

=== Seeds ===
Country	Player	Rank	Seed
DEN	Caroline Wozniacki	1	1
RUS	Vera Zvonareva	3	2
BLR	Victoria Azarenka	4	3
RUS	Maria Sharapova	5	4
CHN	Li Na	6	5
CZE	Petra Kvitová	7	6
ITA	Francesca Schiavone	8	7
FRA	Marion Bartoli	9	8
GER	Andrea Petkovic	10	9
AUS	Samantha Stosur	11	10
POL	Agnieszka Radwańska	12	11
RUS	Anastasia Pavlyuchenkova	13	12
SRB	Jelena Janković	14	13
RUS	Svetlana Kuznetsova	15	14
SRB	Ana Ivanovic	16	15
CHN	Peng Shuai	17	16

- Seedings are based on the rankings of August 8, 2011.

=== Other entrants ===
The following players received wildcards into the singles main draw

- (Slovenia) Polona Hercog
- (United States) Christina McHale
- (Russia) Maria Sharapova
- (United States) Sloane Stephens

The following players received entry from the qualifying draw:

- (Greece) Eleni Daniilidou
- (Japan) Kimiko Date-Krumm
- (Czech Republic) Petra Cetkovská
- (United States) Jill Craybas
- (United States) Alexa Glatch
- (Serbia) Bojana Jovanovski
- (Croatia) Petra Martić
- (Romania) Monica Niculescu
- (Australia) Anastasia Rodionova
- (South Africa) Chanelle Scheepers
- (China) Zhang Shuai
- (China) Zheng Jie

The following players received entry from a lucky loser spot:

- (Spain) María José Martínez Sánchez
- (Sweden) Sofia Arvidsson
- (France) Pauline Parmentier

=== Withdrawals ===
- (Slovakia) Dominika Cibulková (abdominal injury)
- (Belgium) Kim Clijsters (abdominal injury)
- (Romania) Alexandra Dulgheru
- (Estonia) Kaia Kanepi
- (United States) Bethanie Mattek-Sands
- (Austria) Tamira Paszek
- (Poland) Agnieszka Radwańska (right shoulder injury)
- (Belarus) Victoria Azarenka (right hand injury)
- (United States) Venus Williams (viral illness)

== Finals ==
=== Men's singles ===
(United Kingdom) Andy Murray def. (Serbia) Novak Djokovic, 6–4, 3–0, ret.

- It was Murray's 2nd title of the year and 18th of his career. It was his 1st Masters 1000 title of the year and 7th of his career. It was his 2nd win at Cincinnati, also winning in 2008. It was the second defeat for Djokovic in the season.

=== Women's singles ===
(Russia) Maria Sharapova def. (Serbia) Jelena Janković, 4–6, 7–6^{(7–3)}, 6–3

- It was Sharapova's 2nd title of the year and 24th of her career.

=== Men's doubles ===
(India) Mahesh Bhupathi / (India) Leander Paes def. (France) Michaël Llodra / (Serbia) Nenad Zimonjić, 7–6^{(7–4)}, 7–6^{(7–2)}

=== Women's doubles ===
(United States) Vania King / (Kazakhstan) Yaroslava Shvedova def. (South Africa) Natalie Grandin / (Czech Republic) Vladimíra Uhlířová, 6–4, 3–6, [11–9]

Preceded by Montreal	2011 US Open Series; Men's Events	Succeeded by Winston-Salem
Preceded by Toronto	2011 US Open Series; Women's Events	Succeeded by New Haven
