= 2011 Rogers Cup =

- Date: August 8–14
- Edition: 122nd (men) / 110th (women)
- Surface: Hard / outdoor

Champions

Men's singles
- (Serbia) Novak Djokovic

Women's singles
- (United States) Serena Williams

Men's doubles
- (France) Michaël Llodra / (Serbia) Nenad Zimonjić

Women's doubles
- (United States) Liezel Huber / (United States) Lisa Raymond
- Canadian Open

The 2011 Canada Masters (also known as the 2011 Rogers Cup presented by National Bank and the 2011 Rogers Cup for sponsorship reasons) was a tennis tournament played on outdoor hard courts in Canada. It was the 122nd edition of the Canada Masters (110th for the women) and was part of the ATP World Tour Masters 1000 of the 2011 ATP World Tour and the Premier Series of the 2011 WTA Tour. The women's and legends event was held at the Rexall Centre in Toronto, Canada, and the men's event took place at the Uniprix Stadium in Montreal, Canada, from August 8 to August 14.

== Finals ==
=== Men's singles ===
(Serbia) Novak Djokovic defeated (United States) Mardy Fish, 6–2, 3–6, 6–4

- It was Djokovic's 9th title of the year and 27th of his career. It was his 5th Masters 1000 of the year and 10th of his career. It was his second win at the Rogers Cup, winning in 2007. The No. 1 in the world was 53 of 54 wins in the season.

=== Women's singles ===
(United States) Serena Williams defeated (Australia) Samantha Stosur, 6–4, 6–2

- It was Williams' 2nd title of the year and 39th of her career. It was her 2nd title in Canada, also winning in 2001.

=== Men's doubles ===
(France) Michaël Llodra / (Serbia) Nenad Zimonjić defeated (United States) Bob Bryan / (United States) Mike Bryan, 6–4, 6–7^{(5–7)}, [10–5]

=== Women's doubles ===
(United States) Liezel Huber / (United States) Lisa Raymond defeated (Belarus) Victoria Azarenka / (Russia) Maria Kirilenko, walkover

== Points and prize money ==
=== Point distribution ===
| Stage | Men's singles | Men's doubles | Women's singles | Women's doubles |
|---|---|---|---|---|
| Champion | 1000 | | 900 | |
| Runner up | 600 | | 620 | |
| Semifinals | 360 | | 395 | |
| Quarterfinals | 180 | | 225 | |
| Round of 16 | 90 | | 125 | |
| Round of 32 | 45 | 10 | 70 | 1 |
| Round of 64 | 10 | – | 1 | – |
| Qualifier | 25 | – | 30 | – |
| Qualifying Finalist | 14 | – | 12 | – |
| Qualifying 1st round | - | – | 1 | – |

=== Prize money ===
All money is in C$:

| Stage | Men's singles | Men's doubles | Women's singles | Women's doubles |
|---|---|---|---|---|
| Champion | $450,000 | $140,000 | $360,000 | $100,000 |
| Runner up | $224,000 | $70,000 | $180,000 | $50,000 |
| Semifinals | $114,825 | $35,500 | $90,000 | $25,000 |
| Quarterfinals | $59,700 | $18,470 | $41,450 | $12,500 |
| Round of 16 | $31,280 | $9,690 | $20,550 | $6,250 |
| Round of 32 | $16,370 | $5,090 | $10,575 | $3,170 |
| Round of 64 | $8,570 | – | $5,500 | – |
| Final round qualifying | $2,000 | – | $1,995 | – |
| First round qualifying | $1,000 | – | $1,035 | – |

== ATP entrants ==
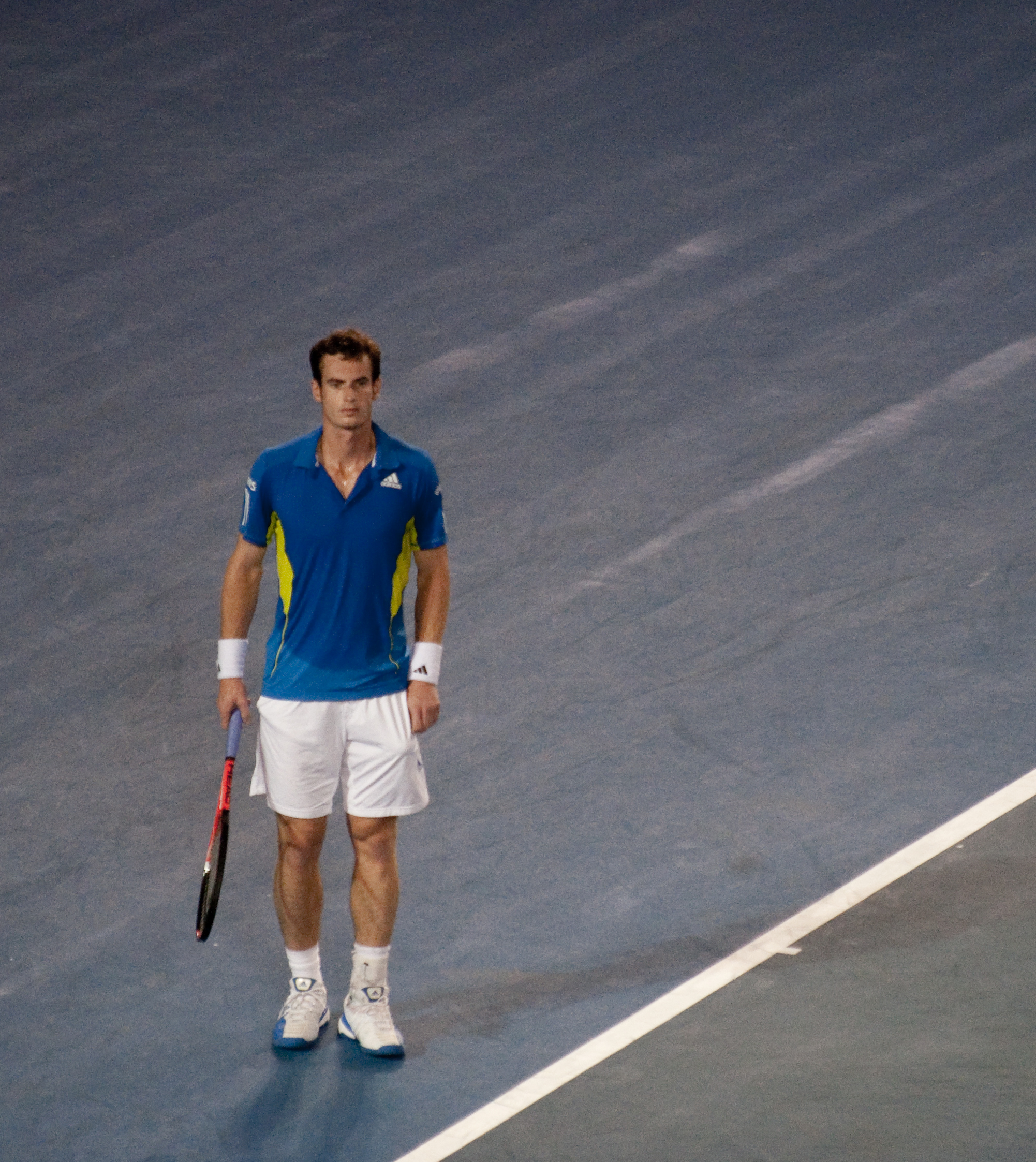
Andy Murray was en route to defend his singles title for the third straight time, but lost to Kevin Anderson in straight sets in the second round.

=== Seeds ===
| Country | Player | Rank^{[a]} | Seed^{[b]} |
|---|---|---|---|
| SRB | Novak Djokovic | 1 | 1 |
| ESP | Rafael Nadal | 2 | 2 |
| SUI | Roger Federer | 3 | 3 |
| GBR | Andy Murray | 4 | 4 |
| FRA | Gaël Monfils | 7 | 5 |
| USA | Mardy Fish | 8 | 6 |
| CZE | Tomáš Berdych | 9 | 7 |
| ESP | Nicolás Almagro | 10 | 8 |
| FRA | Gilles Simon | 11 | 9 |
| FRA | Richard Gasquet | 13 | 10 |
| RUS | Mikhail Youzhny | 14 | 11 |
| SRB | Viktor Troicki | 15 | 12 |
| FRA | Jo-Wilfried Tsonga | 16 | 13 |
| SUI | Stanislas Wawrinka | 17 | 14 |
| ESP | Fernando Verdasco | 19 | 15 |
| ARG | Juan Martín del Potro | 20 | 16 |

- Seedings are based on the rankings of August 1, 2011.

=== Other entrants ===
The following players received wildcards into the singles main draw:

- (Canada) Érik Chvojka
- (Latvia) Ernests Gulbis
- (Canada) Vasek Pospisil
- (Australia) Bernard Tomic

The following players received entry from the qualifying draw:

- (United States) Alex Bogomolov Jr.
- (Italy) Flavio Cipolla
- (Colombia) Alejandro Falla
- (Germany) Tobias Kamke
- (Germany) Philipp Petzschner
- (United States) Michael Russell
- (United States) Michael Yani

The following players received entry from a lucky loser spot:

- (Chinese Taipei) Lu Yen-hsun

=== Withdrawals ===
- (Spain) David Ferrer (wrist injury)
- (Spain) Guillermo García López (appendicitis)
- (Belgium) Xavier Malisse (personal reason)
- (Austria) Jürgen Melzer (quad injury)
- (Canada) Peter Polansky (groin injury)
- (Canada) Milos Raonic (hip injury)
- (United States) Andy Roddick (oblique injury)
- (Sweden) Robin Söderling (wrist injury)

== WTA entrants ==
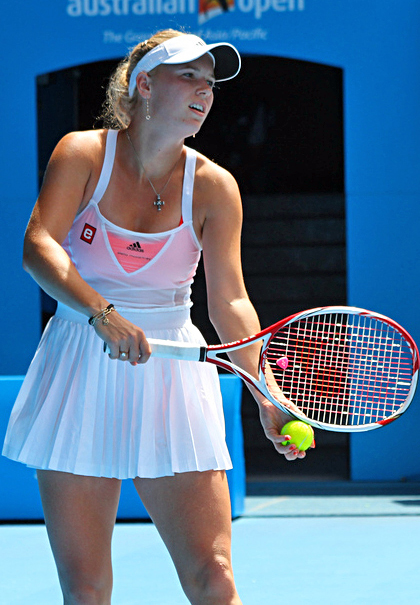
Caroline Wozniacki failed to defend the women's singles title

=== Seeds ===
| Country | Player | Rank | Seed |
|---|---|---|---|
| DEN | Caroline Wozniacki | 1 | 1 |
| BEL | Kim Clijsters | 2 | 2 |
| RUS | Vera Zvonareva | 3 | 3 |
| BLR | Victoria Azarenka | 4 | 4 |
| RUS | Maria Sharapova | 5 | 5 |
| CHN | Li Na | 6 | 6 |
| CZE | Petra Kvitová | 7 | 7 |
| ITA | Francesca Schiavone | 8 | 8 |
| FRA | Marion Bartoli | 9 | 9 |
| AUS | Samantha Stosur | 10 | 10 |
| GER | Andrea Petkovic | 11 | 11 |
| RUS | Svetlana Kuznetsova | 12 | 12 |
| POL | Agnieszka Radwańska | 13 | 13 |
| RUS | Anastasia Pavlyuchenkova | 14 | 14 |
| SRB | Jelena Janković | 15 | 15 |
| SVK | Dominika Cibulková | 16 | 16 |

- Seedings are based on the rankings of August 1, 2011.

=== Other entrants ===
The following players received wildcards into the singles main draw

- (Canada) Eugenie Bouchard
- (Canada) Stéphanie Dubois
- (Canada) Aleksandra Wozniak

The following players received entry from the qualifying draw:

- (Hungary) Gréta Arn
- (Czech Republic) Iveta Benešová
- (Italy) Alberta Brianti
- (Romania) Simona Halep
- (Slovenia) Polona Hercog
- (Serbia) Bojana Jovanovski
- (Croatia) Petra Martić
- (Spain) María José Martínez Sánchez
- (Kazakhstan) Galina Voskoboeva
- (Germany) Kathrin Wörle
- (China) Zhang Shuai
- (China) Zheng Jie

The following players received entry from a lucky loser spot:

- (Spain) Lourdes Domínguez Lino

=== Withdrawals ===
- (United States) Venus Williams (Viral Illness)

| Preceded by Washington, D.C. | 2011 US Open Series; Men's Events | Succeeded by Cincinnati |
| Preceded by Carlsbad | 2011 US Open Series; Women's Events | Succeeded by Cincinnati |
