= 2011 Winston-Salem Open =

- Date: August 22–27
- Edition: 43rd
- Category: World Tour 250 series
- Draw: 48S /16D
- Prize money: $553,125
- Surface: Hard / outdoor
- Location: Winston-Salem, North Carolina, United States
- Venue: Wake Forest University

Champions

Singles
- (United States) John Isner

Doubles
- (Israel) Jonathan Erlich / (Israel) Andy Ram
← 2010 ·	Winston-Salem Open	· 2012 →

The 2011 Winston-Salem Open was a men's tennis tournament played on outdoor hard courts. It was previously known as the Pilot Pen Tennis but was relocated to Winston-Salem. It was the 43rd edition of the Winston-Salem Open, and was part of the ATP World Tour 250 series of the 2011 ATP World Tour. It took place at the Wake Forest University in Winston-Salem, North Carolina, United States, from August 22 through August 27, 2011. It was the last event on the 2011 US Open Series before the 2011 US Open.

Fourth-seeded John Isner won the singles title.

== ATP entrants ==
=== Seeds ===
Country	Player	Ranking*	Seed
USA	Andy Roddick	15	1
AUT	Jürgen Melzer	18	2
UKR	Alexandr Dolgopolov	22	3
USA	John Isner	27	4
RUS	Nikolay Davydenko	31	5
RSA	Kevin Anderson	35	6
ARG	Juan Mónaco	39	7
CYP	Marcos Baghdatis	40	8
UKR	Sergiy Stakhovsky	42	9
NED	Robin Haase	43	10
RUS	Dmitry Tursunov	44	11
ESP	Pablo Andújar	46	12
FIN	Jarkko Nieminen	51	13
BUL	Grigor Dimitrov	56	14
COL	Santiago Giraldo	57	15
RUS	Igor Kunitsyn	59	16

- Seedings are based on the rankings of August 15, 2011.

=== Other entrants ===
The following players received wildcards into the singles main draw

- (United States) Ryan Harrison
- (Australia) Lleyton Hewitt
- (United States) Andy Roddick
- (United States) Donald Young

The following players received entry from the qualifying draw:

- (France) Julien Benneteau
- (Brazil) Ricardo Mello
- (Japan) Kei Nishikori
- (United States) Michael Russell

The following players received entry from a lucky loser spot:

- (France) Édouard Roger-Vasselin
- (Canada) Pierre-Ludovic Duclos

== Finals ==
=== Singles ===
(United States) John Isner defeated (France) Julien Benneteau, 4–6, 6–3, 6–4

- It was Isner's 2nd title of the year and 3rd of his career.

=== Doubles ===
(Israel) Jonathan Erlich / (Israel) Andy Ram defeated (Germany) Christopher Kas / (Austria) Alexander Peya, 7–6^{(7–2)}, 6–4

Preceded by Cincinnati	2011 US Open Series; Men's Events	Succeeded by New York – US Open
