= 2011 New Haven Open at Yale =

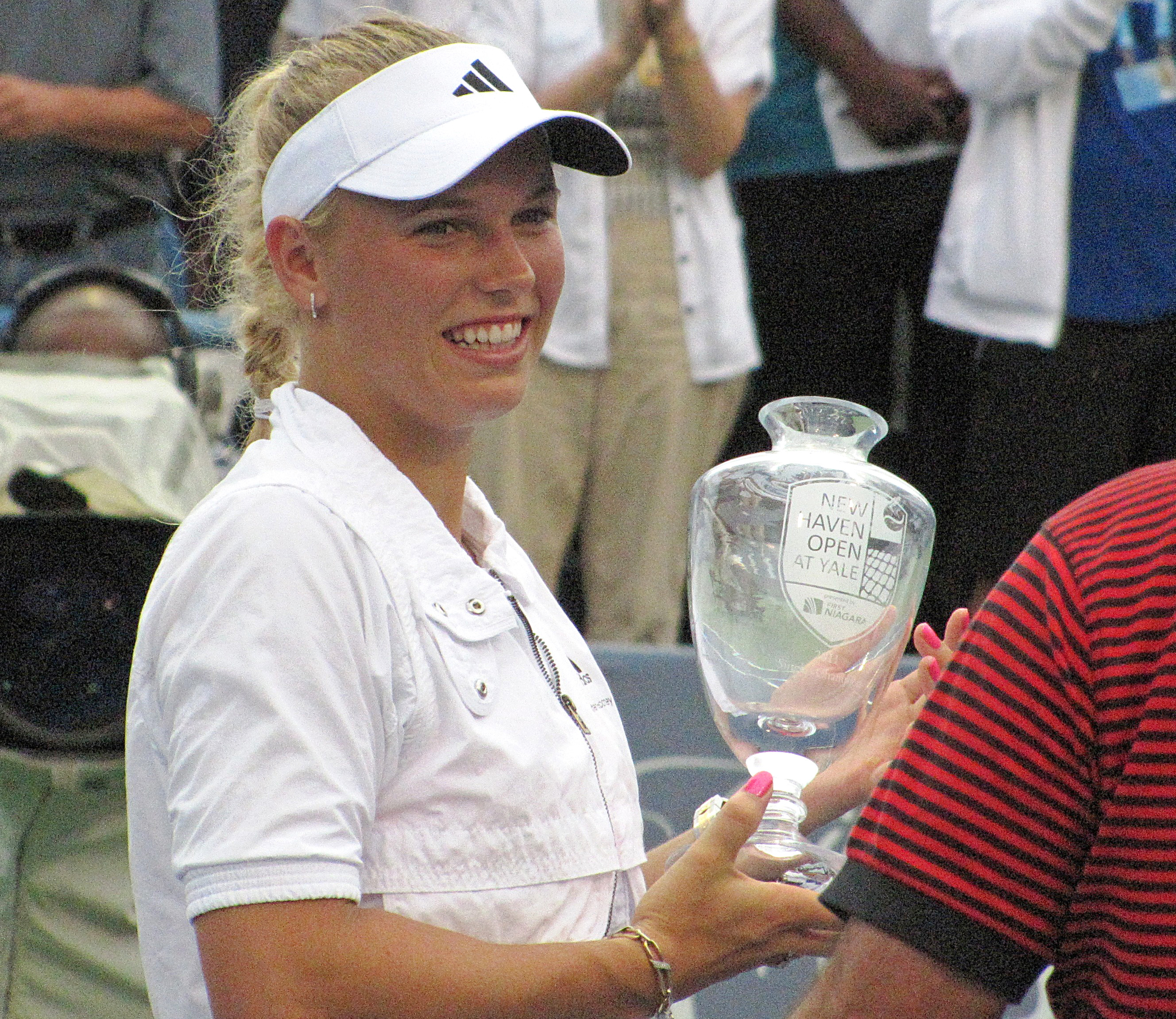
- Date: August 22–27
- Edition: 43rd
- Category: WTA Premier
- Surface: Hard / outdoor
- Location: New Haven, CN, US
- Venue: Cullman-Heyman Tennis Center

Champions

Singles
- (Denmark) Caroline Wozniacki

Doubles
- (Chinese Taipei) Chuang Chia-jung / (Belarus) Olga Govortsova
← 2010 ·	New Haven Open at Yale	· 2012 →

The 2011 New Haven Open at Yale was a women's tennis tournament played on outdoor hard courts. It was the 43rd edition of the New Haven Open at Yale, and was part of the Premier Series of the 2011 WTA Tour. It was previously known as "Pilot Pen Tennis". It took place at the Cullman-Heyman Tennis Center in New Haven, Connecticut, United States, from August 22 through August 27, 2011. It was the last event on the 2011 US Open Series before the 2011 US Open.

== WTA entrants ==
=== Seeds ===
Country	Player	Ranking*	Seed
DEN	Caroline Wozniacki	1	1
CHN	Li Na	5	2
ITA	Francesca Schiavone	8	3
FRA	Marion Bartoli	9	4
POL	Agnieszka Radwańska	12	5
RUS	Svetlana Kuznetsova	13	6
SRB	Jelena Janković	14	7
RUS	Anastasia Pavlyuchenkova	18	8

- Seedings are based on the rankings of August 15, 2011.

=== Other entrants ===
The following players received wildcards into the singles main draw

- (France) Marion Bartoli
- (Serbia) Jelena Janković
- (China) Li Na
- (United States) Christina McHale

The following players received entry from the qualifying draw:

- (Czech Republic) Petra Cetkovská
- (Russia) Vera Dushevina
- (Russia) Ksenia Pervak
- (Australia) Anastasia Rodionova

The following players received entry from a lucky loser spot:

- (Spain) Carla Suárez Navarro

== Finals ==
=== Singles ===
(Denmark) Caroline Wozniacki defeated (Czech Republic) Petra Cetkovská, 6–4, 6–1

- It was Wozniacki's 6th title of the year and 18th of her career. It was her 4th consecutive win at the event, matching the feat Venus Williams had also done at New Haven. It was her 3rd premier-level title of the year and 7th of her career.

=== Doubles ===
(Chinese Taipei) Chuang Chia-jung / (Belarus) Olga Govortsova defeated (Italy) Sara Errani / (Italy) Roberta Vinci, 7–5, 6–2

== 2011 Earthquake ==
On August 23, 2011, 1:51 PM local time a 5.8 magnitude earthquake in Virginia stopped play for two hours while the main stadium was checked for damage by the fire department.

Preceded by Cincinnati	2011 US Open Series; Women's Events	Succeeded by New York – US Open
