= 2011 Bank of the West Classic =

- Date: July 25–31
- Edition: 40th
- Category: WTA Premier tournaments
- Draw: 28S / 16D
- Prize money: $721,000
- Surface: Hard / outdoor
- Location: Stanford, California, US
- Venue: Taube Tennis Center

Champions

Singles
- (United States) Serena Williams

Doubles
- (Belarus) Victoria Azarenka / (Russia) Maria Kirilenko
- Bank of the West Classic

The 2011 Bank of the West Classic was a women's tennis tournament played on outdoor hard courts. It was the 40th edition of the Bank of the West Classic, and was a part of the WTA Premier tournaments of the 2011 WTA Tour. It took place at the Taube Tennis Center in Stanford, California, United States, from July 26 through July 31, 2011. It was the first women's event on the 2011 US Open Series. Unseeded Serena Williams won the singles title.

== Entrants ==
=== Seeds ===
Nation	Player	Ranking*	Seed
BLR	Victoria Azarenka	4	1
RUS	Maria Sharapova	5	2
FRA	Marion Bartoli	9	3
AUS	Samantha Stosur	10	4
POL	Agnieszka Radwańska	14	5
GER	Julia Görges	16	6
SRB	Ana Ivanovic	18	7
SVK	Dominika Cibulková	20	8

- Seedings are based on the rankings of July 18, 2011.

=== Other entrants ===
The following players received wildcards into the singles main draw

- (United States) Hilary Barte
- (Slovakia) Dominika Cibulková

The following players received entry from the qualifying draw:

- (New Zealand) Marina Erakovic
- (Japan) Rika Fujiwara
- (Poland) Urszula Radwańska
- (Ukraine) Olga Savchuk

== Finals ==
=== Singles ===
(United States) Serena Williams defeated (France) Marion Bartoli, 7–5, 6–1

- It was Williams' 1st title of the year and 38th of her career.

=== Doubles ===
(Belarus) Victoria Azarenka / (Russia) Maria Kirilenko defeated (United States) Liezel Huber / (United States) Lisa Raymond, 6–1, 6–3

Preceded by None	2011 US Open Series Women's Events	Succeeded by San Diego
