= Winston-Salem Open =

Men's professional tennis tournament in North Carolina

Coordinates: 36°7′53.3″N 80°15′13.3″W

- 2026 Winston-Salem Open

ATP Tour
- Location: Winston-Salem, North Carolina; United States
- Venue: Wake Forest University
- Category: ATP 250
- Surface: Hardcourt / outdoor
- Draw: 48S / 32Q / 16D
- Prize money: US$823,420 (2022)
- Website: winstonsalemopen.com

Current champions (2026)
- Singles: (Peru) Ignacio Buse
- Doubles: (Austria) Neil Oberleitner (Czech Republic) Petr Nouza

The Winston-Salem Open is a men's professional tennis tournament played on the ATP Tour at Wake Forest University in Winston-Salem, North Carolina in the United States. It made its debut at Winston-Salem in 2011 and is part of the ATP 250 tournaments. It was previously held in Long Island and New Haven before it was sold and relocated to Winston-Salem, creating a new tournament.

The Winston-Salem Open was awarded the 2016 ATP Tour 250 Tournament of the Year.

== History ==
The event started on Long Island's Jericho hamlet as a four-player singles exhibition in 1981, the event, first known as the Hamlet Challenge Cup, developed into a larger draw competition, and saw winning numerous top players in the 1980s, including Ivan Lendl and an eighteen-year-old Andre Agassi in 1988. In 1990, the Long Island tournament became part of the tour as it entered the newly created Association of Tennis Professionals (ATP) Tour, being sponsored by numerous companies including; Norstar Bank in 1990 and 1991, Waldbaum's from 1992 to 1995 and from 1997 to 2000, Genovese Drug Stores in 1996, and TD Waterhouse from 2002 until the move to New Haven, adding names like Stefan Edberg, Yevgeny Kafelnikov, Magnus Norman, Paradorn Srichaphan and Lleyton Hewitt to its list of champions.

In 2005 the USTA decided to purchase the men's tournament of Long Island, New York and merge it with the Women's event at New Haven. This move created the first large joint ATP–WTA tournament leading to the US Open. The tournament remained a joint event until 2011 when the men's and women's events became separated, and the men's tournament relocated to Winston-Salem. The tournament ignored its history with the ATP calling it a new event.

== Tournament ==
The tournament joined the US Open Series in 2011 and remained part of the Series through its final year in 2023. It is typically held in August the week prior to the US Open. It used to be one of six 250 level events on tour played in the United States but from 2025 it is one of only three. In 2016, the tournament received recognition as one of the ATP World Tour 250 Tournaments of the Year.

Ivan Lendl holds the record for most singles titles at five, winning in 1984–1986, 1989 and 1991; he also holds the record for most singles titles won in a row, at three. The only doubles team to win back-to-back titles is Jonathan Stark and Kevin Ullyett.

== Past finals ==
=== Singles ===
| Location | Year | Champions | Runners-up | Score |
|---|---|---|---|---|
| Long Island (exhibition) | 1981 | (United States) Brian Teacher | (France) Yannick Noah | 4–6, 6–3, 6–4 |
| Long Island (exhibition) | 1982 | (United States) Gene Mayer | (United States) Johan Kriek | 6–2, 6–3 |
| Long Island (exhibition) | 1983 | (United States) Gene Mayer | (Switzerland) Heinz Günthardt | 6–7^{(9–11)}, 6–4, 6–0 |
| Long Island (exhibition) | 1984 | (Czech Republic) Ivan Lendl | (Ecuador) Andrés Gómez | 6–2, 6–4 |
| Long Island (exhibition) | 1985 | (Czech Republic) Ivan Lendl | (United States) Jimmy Connors | 6–1, 6–3 |
| Long Island (exhibition) | 1986 | (Czech Republic) Ivan Lendl | (United States) John McEnroe | 6–2, 6–4 |
| Long Island (exhibition) | 1987 | (Sweden) Jonas Svensson | (United States) David Pate | 7–6, 3–6, 6–3 |
| Long Island (exhibition) | 1988 | (United States) Andre Agassi | (France) Yannick Noah | 6–3, 0–6, 6–4 |
| Long Island (exhibition) | 1989 | (Czech Republic) Ivan Lendl | (Sweden) Mikael Pernfors | 4–6, 6–2, 6–4 |
| Long Island | 1990 | (Sweden) Stefan Edberg | (Socialist Federal Republic of Yugoslavia) Goran Ivanišević | 7–6^{(7–3)}, 6–3 |
| Long Island | 1991 | (Czech Republic) Ivan Lendl | (Sweden) Stefan Edberg | 6–3, 6–2 |
| Long Island | 1992 | (Czech Republic) Petr Korda | (United States) Ivan Lendl | 6–2, 6–2 |
| Long Island | 1993 | (Switzerland) Marc Rosset | (United States) Michael Chang | 6–4, 3–6, 6–1 |
| Long Island | 1994 | (Russia) Yevgeny Kafelnikov | (France) Cédric Pioline | 5–7, 6–1, 6–2 |
| Long Island | 1995 | (Russia) Yevgeny Kafelnikov | (Netherlands) Jan Siemerink | 7–6^{(7–0)}, 6–2 |
| Long Island | 1996 | (Ukraine) Andrei Medvedev | (Czech Republic) Martin Damm | 7–5, 6–3 |
| Long Island | 1997 | (Spain) Carlos Moyá | (Australia) Patrick Rafter | 6–4, 7–6^{(7–1)} |
| Long Island | 1998 | (Australia) Patrick Rafter | (Spain) Félix Mantilla | 7–6^{(7–3)}, 6–2 |
| Long Island | 1999 | (Sweden) Magnus Norman | (Spain) Àlex Corretja | 7–6^{(7–4)}, 4–6, 6–3 |
| Long Island | 2000 | (Sweden) Magnus Norman | (Sweden) Thomas Enqvist | 6–3, 5–7, 7–5 |
| Long Island | 2001 | (Germany) Tommy Haas | (United States) Pete Sampras | 6–3, 3–6, 6–2 |
| Long Island | 2002 | (Thailand) Paradorn Srichaphan | (Argentina) Juan Ignacio Chela | 5–7, 6–2, 6–2 |
| Long Island | 2003 | (Thailand) Paradorn Srichaphan | (United States) James Blake | 6–2, 6–4 |
| Long Island | 2004 | (Australia) Lleyton Hewitt | (Peru) Luis Horna | 6–3, 6–1 |
| New Haven | 2005 | (United States) James Blake | (Spain) Feliciano López | 3–6, 7–5, 6–1 |
| New Haven | 2006 | (Russia) Nikolay Davydenko | (Argentina) Agustín Calleri | 6–4, 6–3 |
| New Haven | 2007 | (United States) James Blake | (United States) Mardy Fish | 7–5, 6–4 |
| New Haven | 2008 | (Croatia) Marin Čilić | (United States) Mardy Fish | 6–4, 4–6, 6–2 |
| New Haven | 2009 | (Spain) Fernando Verdasco | (United States) Sam Querrey | 6–4, 7–6^{(8–6)} |
| New Haven | 2010 | (Ukraine) Sergiy Stakhovsky | (Uzbekistan) Denis Istomin | 3–6, 6–3, 6–4 |
| Winston-Salem | 2011 | (United States) John Isner | (France) Julien Benneteau | 4–6, 6–3, 6–4 |
| Winston-Salem | 2012 | (United States) John Isner | (Czech Republic) Tomáš Berdych | 3–6, 6–4, 7–6^{(11–9)} |
| Winston-Salem | 2013 | (Austria) Jürgen Melzer | (France) Gaël Monfils | 6–3, 2–1, ret. |
| Winston-Salem | 2014 | (Czech Republic) Lukáš Rosol | (Poland) Jerzy Janowicz | 3–6, 7–6^{(7–3)}, 7–5 |
| Winston-Salem | 2015 | (South Africa) Kevin Anderson | (France) Pierre-Hugues Herbert | 6–4, 7–5 |
| Winston-Salem | 2016 | (Spain) Pablo Carreño Busta | (Spain) Roberto Bautista Agut | 6–7^{(6–8)}, 7–6^{(7–1)}, 6–4 |
| Winston-Salem | 2017 | (Spain) Roberto Bautista Agut | (Bosnia and Herzegovina) Damir Džumhur | 6–4, 6–4 |
| Winston-Salem | 2018 | (Russia) Daniil Medvedev | (United States) Steve Johnson | 6–4, 6–4 |
| Winston-Salem | 2019 | (Poland) Hubert Hurkacz | (France) Benoît Paire | 6–3, 3–6, 6–3 |
| Winston-Salem | 2021 | (Belarus) Ilya Ivashka | (Sweden) Mikael Ymer | 6–0, 6–2 |
| Winston-Salem | 2022 | (France) Adrian Mannarino | (Serbia) Laslo Djere | 7–6^{(7–1)}, 6–4 |
| Winston-Salem | 2023 | (Argentina) Sebastián Báez | (Czech Republic) Jiří Lehečka | 6–4, 6–3 |
| Winston-Salem | 2024 | (Italy) Lorenzo Sonego | (United States) Alex Michelsen | 6–0, 6–3 |
| Winston-Salem | 2025 | (Hungary) Márton Fucsovics | (Netherlands) Botic van de Zandschulp | 6–3, 7–6^{(7–3)} |

=== Doubles ===
| Location | Year | Champions | Runners-up | Score |
|---|---|---|---|---|
| Long Island | 1990 | (France) Guy Forget (Switzerland) Jakob Hlasek | (Germany) Udo Riglewski (Germany) Michael Stich | 2–6, 6–3, 6–4 |
| Long Island | 1991 | (Germany) Eric Jelen (Germany) Carl-Uwe Steeb | (United States) Doug Flach (Italy) Diego Nargiso | 0–6, 6–4, 7–6 |
| Long Island | 1992 | (United States) Francisco Montana (United States) Greg Van Emburgh | (Italy) Gianluca Pozzi (Finland) Olli Rahnasto | 6–4, 6–2 |
| Long Island | 1993 | (Germany) Marc-Kevin Goellner (Germany) David Prinosil | (France) Arnaud Boetsch (France) Olivier Delaître | 6–7, 7–5, 6–2 |
| Long Island | 1994 | (France) Olivier Delaître (France) Guy Forget | (Australia) Andrew Florent (United Kingdom) Mark Petchey | 6–4, 7–6 |
| Long Island | 1995 | (Czech Republic) Cyril Suk (Czech Republic) Daniel Vacek | (United States) Rick Leach (United States) Scott Melville | 5–7, 7–6, 7–6 |
| Long Island | 1996 | (United States) Luke Jensen (United States) Murphy Jensen | (Germany) Hendrik Dreekmann (Russia) Alexander Volkov | 6–3, 7–6 |
| Long Island | 1997 | (South Africa) Marcos Ondruska (Germany) David Prinosil | (United States) Mark Keil (United States) T.J. Middleton | 6–4, 6–4 |
| Long Island | 1998 | (Spain) Julian Alonso (Spain) Javier Sánchez | (United States) Brandon Coupe (United States) Dave Randall | 6–4, 6–4 |
| Long Island | 1999 | (France) Olivier Delaître (France) Fabrice Santoro | (United States) Jan-Michael Gambill (United States) Scott Humphries | 7–5, 6–4 |
| Long Island | 2000 | (United States) Jonathan Stark (Zimbabwe) Kevin Ullyett | (United States) Jan-Michael Gambill (United States) Scott Humphries | 6–4, 6–4 |
| Long Island | 2001 | (United States) Jonathan Stark (Zimbabwe) Kevin Ullyett | (Czech Republic) Leoš Friedl (Czech Republic) Radek Štěpánek | 6–1, 6–4 |
| Long Island | 2002 | (India) Mahesh Bhupathi (United States) Mike Bryan | (Czech Republic) Petr Pála (Czech Republic) Pavel Vízner | 6–3, 6–4 |
| Long Island | 2003 | (South Africa) Robbie Koenig (Argentina) Martín Rodríguez | (Czech Republic) Martin Damm (Czech Republic) Cyril Suk | 6–3, 7–6 |
| Long Island | 2004 | (France) Antony Dupuis (France) Michaël Llodra | (Switzerland) Yves Allegro (Germany) Michael Kohlmann | 6–2, 6–4 |
| New Haven | 2005 | (Argentina) Gastón Etlis (Argentina) Martín Rodríguez | (United States) Rajeev Ram (United States) Bobby Reynolds | 6–4, 6–3 |
| New Haven | 2006 | (Israel) Jonathan Erlich (Israel) Andy Ram | (Poland) Mariusz Fyrstenberg (Poland) Marcin Matkowski | 6–3, 6–3 |
| New Haven | 2007 | (India) Mahesh Bhupathi (Serbia) Nenad Zimonjić | (Poland) Mariusz Fyrstenberg (Poland) Marcin Matkowski | 6–3, 6–3 |
| New Haven | 2008 | (Brazil) Marcelo Melo (Brazil) André Sá | (India) Mahesh Bhupathi (The Bahamas) Mark Knowles | 7–5, 6–2 |
| New Haven | 2009 | (Austria) Julian Knowle (Austria) Jürgen Melzer | (Brazil) Bruno Soares (Zimbabwe) Kevin Ullyett | 6–4, 7–6^{(7–3)} |
| New Haven | 2010 | (Sweden) Robert Lindstedt (Romania) Horia Tecău | (India) Rohan Bopanna (Pakistan) Aisam-ul-Haq Qureshi | 6–4, 7–5 |
| Winston-Salem | 2011 | (Israel) Jonathan Erlich (Israel) Andy Ram | (Germany) Christopher Kas (Austria) Alexander Peya | 7–6^{(7–2)}, 6–4 |
| Winston-Salem | 2012 | (Mexico) Santiago González (United States) Scott Lipsky | (Spain) Pablo Andújar (Argentina) Leonardo Mayer | 6–3, 4–6, [10–2] |
| Winston-Salem | 2013 | (Canada) Daniel Nestor (India) Leander Paes | (Philippines) Treat Huey (United Kingdom) Dominic Inglot | 7–6^{(12–10)}, 7–5 |
| Winston-Salem | 2014 | (Colombia) Juan Sebastián Cabal (Colombia) Robert Farah | (United Kingdom) Jamie Murray (Australia) John Peers | 6–3, 6–4 |
| Winston-Salem | 2015 | (United Kingdom) Dominic Inglot (Sweden) Robert Lindstedt | (United States) Eric Butorac (United States) Scott Lipsky | 6–2, 6–4 |
| Winston-Salem | 2016 | (Spain) Guillermo García-López (Finland) Henri Kontinen | (Germany) Andre Begemann (India) Leander Paes | 4–6, 7–6^{(8–6)}, [10–8] |
| Winston-Salem | 2017 | (Netherlands) Jean-Julien Rojer (Romania) Horia Tecău | (Chile) Julio Peralta (Argentina) Horacio Zeballos | 6–3, 6–4 |
| Winston-Salem | 2018 | (Netherlands) Jean-Julien Rojer (Romania) Horia Tecău | (United States) James Cerretani (India) Leander Paes | 6–4, 6–2 |
| Winston-Salem | 2019 | (Poland) Łukasz Kubot (Brazil) Marcelo Melo | (United States) Nicholas Monroe (United States) Tennys Sandgren | 6–7^{(6–8)}, 6–1, [10–3] |
| Winston-Salem | 2021 | (El Salvador) Marcelo Arévalo (Netherlands) Matwé Middelkoop | (Croatia) Ivan Dodig (United States) Austin Krajicek | 6–7^{(5–7)}, 7–5, [10–6] |
| Winston-Salem | 2022 | (Australia) Matthew Ebden (United Kingdom) Jamie Murray | (Monaco) Hugo Nys (Poland) Jan Zieliński | 6–4, 6–2 |
| Winston-Salem | 2023 | (United States) Nathaniel Lammons (United States) Jackson Withrow | (United Kingdom) Lloyd Glasspool (United Kingdom) Neal Skupski | 6–3, 6–4 |
| Winston-Salem | 2024 | (United States) Nathaniel Lammons (United States) Jackson Withrow | (United Kingdom) Julian Cash (United States) Robert Galloway | 6–4, 6–3 |
| Winston-Salem | 2025 | (Brazil) Rafael Matos (Brazil) Marcelo Melo | (Portugal) Francisco Cabral (Austria) Lucas Miedler | 4–6, 6–4, [10–8] |
