= 2010 in tennis =

This page covers all the important events in the sport of tennis in 2010. Primarily, it provides the results of notable tournaments throughout the year on both the ATP and WTA Tours, the Davis Cup, and the Fed Cup.

== ITF ==
=== Grand Slam events ===
Championship	Category	Champion(s)	Finalist(s)	Score in the final
Australian Open (January 18–31)	Men's singles	(Switzerland) Roger Federer	(United Kingdom) Andy Murray	6–3, 6–4, 7–6(11)
Australian Open (January 18–31)	Women's singles	(United States) Serena Williams	(Belgium) Justine Henin	6–4, 3–6, 6–2
Australian Open (January 18–31)	Men's doubles	(United States) Bob Bryan (United States) Mike Bryan	(Canada) Daniel Nestor (Serbia) Nenad Zimonjić	6–3, 6–7(5), 6–3
Australian Open (January 18–31)	Women's doubles	(United States) Serena Williams (United States) Venus Williams	(Zimbabwe) Cara Black (United States) Liezel Huber	6–4, 6–3
Australian Open (January 18–31)	Mixed doubles	(Zimbabwe) Cara Black (India) Leander Paes	(Russia) Ekaterina Makarova (Czech Republic) Jaroslav Levinský	7–5, 6–3

Championship	Category	Champion(s)	Finalist(s)	Score in the final
French Open (May 23 – June 6)	Men's singles	(Spain) Rafael Nadal	(Sweden) Robin Söderling	6–4, 6–2, 6–4
French Open (May 23 – June 6)	Women's singles	(Italy) Francesca Schiavone	(Australia) Samantha Stosur	6–4, 7–6(2)
French Open (May 23 – June 6)	Men's doubles	(Canada) Daniel Nestor (Serbia) Nenad Zimonjić	(Czech Republic) Lukáš Dlouhý (India) Leander Paes	7–5, 6–2
French Open (May 23 – June 6)	Women's doubles	(United States) Serena Williams (United States) Venus Williams	(Czech Republic) Květa Peschke (Slovenia) Katarina Srebotnik	6–2, 6–3
French Open (May 23 – June 6)	Mixed doubles	(Slovenia) Katarina Srebotnik (Serbia) Nenad Zimonjić	(Kazakhstan) Yaroslava Shvedova (Austria) Julian Knowle	4–6, 7–6(5), [11–9]

Championship	Category	Champion(s)	Finalist(s)	Score in the final
Wimbledon Championships (June 21 – July 4)	Men's singles	(Spain) Rafael Nadal	(Czech Republic) Tomáš Berdych	6–3, 7–5, 6–4
Wimbledon Championships (June 21 – July 4)	Women's singles	(United States) Serena Williams	(Russia) Vera Zvonareva	6–3 6–2
Wimbledon Championships (June 21 – July 4)	Men's doubles	(Austria) Jürgen Melzer (Germany) Philipp Petzschner	(Sweden) Robert Lindstedt (Romania) Horia Tecău	6–1, 7–5, 7–5
Wimbledon Championships (June 21 – July 4)	Women's doubles	(United States) Vania King (Kazakhstan) Yaroslava Shvedova	(Russia) Elena Vesnina (Russia) Vera Zvonareva	7–6(6), 6–2
Wimbledon Championships (June 21 – July 4)	Mixed doubles	(Zimbabwe) Cara Black (India) Leander Paes	(United States) Lisa Raymond (South Africa) Wesley Moodie	6–4, 7–6(5)

Championship	Category	Champion(s)	Finalist(s)	Score in the final
US Open (August 30 – September 13)	Men's singles	(Spain) Rafael Nadal	(Serbia) Novak Djokovic	6–4, 5–7, 6–4, 6–2
US Open (August 30 – September 13)	Women's singles	(Belgium) Kim Clijsters	(Russia) Vera Zvonareva	6–2, 6–1
US Open (August 30 – September 13)	Men's doubles	(United States) Bob Bryan (United States) Mike Bryan	(India) Rohan Bopanna (Pakistan) Aisam-ul-Haq Qureshi	7–6(5), 7–6(4)
US Open (August 30 – September 13)	Women's doubles	(United States) Vania King (Kazakhstan) Yaroslava Shvedova	(United States) Liezel Huber (Russia) Nadia Petrova	2–6, 6–4, 7–6(4)
US Open (August 30 – September 13)	Mixed doubles	(United States) Liezel Huber (United States) Bob Bryan	(Czech Republic) Květa Peschke (Pakistan) Aisam-ul-Haq Qureshi	6–4, 6–4

- Just five male players reached at least the third round of all four grand slams: Roger Federer, Rafael Nadal, Novak Djokovic, Andy Murray and Albert Montañés. Only Federer, Nadal, and Djokovic reached the fourth round at all four major, but all three also reached all four quarterfinals.
- Just six female players reached at least the third round of all four grand slams: Caroline Wozniacki, Venus Williams, Jelena Janković, Yanina Wickmayer, Maria Kirilenko, and Alona Bondarenko. Only Wozniacki and Williams reached the fourth round of all four majors.

=== Davis Cup ===
World Group Draw

- S-Seeded
- U-Unseeded
- * Choice of ground

First round 5–7 March
Logroño, Spain (clay)
1	Spain	4
Switzerland	1
Toulon, France (indoor hard)
France	4
8	Germany	1
Moscow, Russia (indoor hard)
4	Russia	3
India	2
Stockholm, Sweden (indoor hard)
Sweden	2
5	Argentina	3
Varaždin, Croatia (indoor hard)
6	Croatia	5
Ecuador	0
Belgrade, Serbia (indoor clay)
Serbia	3
3	United States	2
Coquimbo, Chile (clay) Mar 6–8
Chile	4
7	Israel	1
Bree, Belgium (indoor clay)
Belgium	1
2	Czech Republic	4

Quarterfinals; 9–11 July
Clermont-Ferrand, France (indoor hard)
1	Spain	0
France	5
Moscow, Russia (indoor hard)
4	Russia	2
5	Argentina	3
Split, Croatia (indoor hard)
6	Croatia	1
Serbia	4
Coquimbo, Chile (clay)
Chile	1
2	Czech Republic	4

Semifinals; 17–19 September
Lyon, France (indoor hard)
France	5
5	Argentina	0
Belgrade, Serbia (indoor hard)
Serbia	3
2	Czech Republic	2

Final; 3–5 December
Belgrade, Serbia (indoor hard)
France	2
Serbia	3

=== Fed Cup ===
World Group Draw

- S-Seeded
- U-Unseeded
- * Choice of ground

Quarterfinals; 6–7 February
Kharkiv, Ukraine (indoor hard)
Ukraine	1
1	Italy	4
Brno, Czech Republic (indoor hard)
4	Czech Republic	3
Germany	2
Belgrade, Serbia (indoor hard)
Serbia	2
3	Russia	3
Liévin, France, (indoor clay)
France	1
2	United States	4

Semifinals; 24–25 April
Rome, Italy, (clay)
1	Italy	4
4	Czech Republic	0
Birmingham, Alabama, United States, (indoor hard)
3	Russia	2
2	United States	3

Final; 6–7 November
San Diego, USA, (indoor hard)
1	Italy	3
2	United States	1

== Important events ==
=== January ===
- Nikolay Davydenko became the second player to beat both Roger Federer and Rafael Nadal in the same tournament on separate occasions en route to winning the 2010 Qatar ExxonMobil Open.
- Justine Henin made her return to the WTA Tour by competing in and reaching the final of the 2010 Brisbane International.
- By winning the 2010 Australian Open, Serena Williams tied Billie Jean King with 12 Grand Slam Singles titles.
- Roger Federer won his 16th Grand Slam Singles title (at the Australian Open) to improve his record of most Grand Slam Singles titles won by a man in the open era.
- Andy Roddick, Kim Clijsters, Marin Čilić, Yanina Wickmayer, Marcos Baghdatis, Elena Dementieva, John Isner, and Alona Bondarenko also won titles.

=== February ===
- By successfully defending his title in Zagreb, Marin Čilić opened 2010 with an impressive 15–1 record.
- After being denied a visa the previous year, Shahar Pe'er reached the semi-finals of the 2010 Dubai Tennis Championships in a dream run, where she took out three seeded players, including top-seed Caroline Wozniacki.
- Venus Williams earned her 42nd and 43rd career titles in Dubai and Acapulco, the most by an active player. She also defeated Svetlana Kuznetsova and Kim Clijsters to win the 2010 Billie Jean King Cup.
- Chile decided to still plan to host its Davis Cup series against Israel despite the devastating earthquake that killed at least 700 people in the South American country.
- Feliciano López, Thomaz Bellucci, Fernando Verdasco, Robin Söderling, Juan Carlos Ferrero(2), Elena Dementieva, Vera Zvonareva, Michaël Llodra, Ernests Gulbis, Sam Querrey, Maria Sharapova, Mariana Duque Mariño, Novak Djokovic, David Ferrer, and Alisa Kleybanova also won titles.

=== March ===
- Anastasia Pavlyuchenkova won her first tour singles title in Monterrey.
- Marco Chiudinelli was awarded the 2009 Comeback Player of the Year Award.
- French officials stated that the French Open might leave Roland Garros, the tournament's home for 82 years, if improvements are not made to the infrastructure.
- The 2009 WTA Awards were awarded on March 24 at the Sony Ericsson Open. Winners included the Williams Sisters, Yanina Wickmayer, Liezel Huber, Kim Clijsters, Melanie Oudin, and Elena Dementieva.

Championship	Category	Champion(s)	Finalist(s)	Score in the final
Indian Wells (March 8–21)	Men's singles	(Croatia) Ivan Ljubičić	(United States) Andy Roddick	7–6(3), 7–6(5)
Indian Wells (March 8–21)	Women's singles	(Serbia) Jelena Janković	(Denmark) Caroline Wozniacki	6–2, 6–4
Indian Wells (March 8–21)	Men's doubles	(Spain) Marc López (Spain) Rafael Nadal	(Canada) Daniel Nestor (Serbia) Nenad Zimonjić	7–6(8), 6–3
Indian Wells (March 8–21)	Women's doubles	(Czech Republic) Květa Peschke (Slovenia) Katarina Srebotnik	(Russia) Nadia Petrova (Australia) Samantha Stosur	6–4, 2–6, 10–5

Championship	Category	Champion(s)	Finalist(s)	Score in the final
Miami (March 22 – April 4)	Men's singles	(United States) Andy Roddick	(Czech Republic) Tomáš Berdych	7–5, 6–4
Miami (March 22 – April 4)	Women's singles	(Belgium) Kim Clijsters	(United States) Venus Williams	6–2, 6–1
Miami (March 22 – April 4)	Men's doubles	(Czech Republic) Lukáš Dlouhý (India) Leander Paes	(India) Mahesh Bhupathi (Belarus) Max Mirnyi	6–2, 7–5
Miami (March 22 – April 4)	Women's doubles	(Argentina) Gisela Dulko (Italy) Flavia Pennetta	(Russia) Nadia Petrova (Australia) Samantha Stosur	6–3, 4–6, [10–7]

=== April ===
- After a three-month hiatus due to knee injury, world number one Serena Williams announced her return to take place at the 2010 Internazionali BNL d'Italia.
- By successfully defending his title in Monte Carlo, Rafael Nadal became the first player in the open era to win six back to back titles at a single tournament.
- Justine Henin won her first tournament since her comeback at the Porsche Tennis Grand Prix.
- The Australian, Belgian, French, and Slovak Fed Cup teams won spots in the 2011 World Group.
- Stanislas Wawrinka, Juan Ignacio Chela, Caroline Wozniacki, Flavia Pennetta, Samantha Stosur, Francesca Schiavone, Fernando Verdasco, and Iveta Benešová also won titles.

Championship	Category	Champion(s)	Finalist(s)	Score in the final
Rome (April 24 – May 2)-Men (April 30 – May 8)-Women	Men's singles	(Spain) Rafael Nadal	(Spain) David Ferrer	7–5, 6–2
Rome (April 24 – May 2)-Men (April 30 – May 8)-Women	Women's singles	(Spain) María José Martínez Sánchez	(Serbia) Jelena Janković	7–6(5), 7–5
Rome (April 24 – May 2)-Men (April 30 – May 8)-Women	Men's doubles	(United States) Bob Bryan (United States) Mike Bryan	(United States) John Isner (United States) Sam Querrey	6–2, 6–3
Rome (April 24 – May 2)-Men (April 30 – May 8)-Women	Women's doubles	(Argentina) Gisela Dulko (Italy) Flavia Pennetta	(Spain) Nuria Llagostera Vives (Spain) María José Martínez Sánchez	6–4, 6–2

=== May ===
- Organizers announced that the Madrid Open will be the first tennis tournament to be broadcast for the general public in 3D outside tournament grounds.
- Sam Querrey and John Isner set up the first all-American clay court final in 19 years at the Serbia Open, with Querrey being the victor.
- By winning the 2010 Mutua Madrileña Madrid Open, Rafael Nadal broke three Open Era records. The win gave him a record 18 Masters Series career titles, made him the first player to hold all three clay court Masters Series events in the same season, and also made him the first player to win three consecutive Masters events.
- By virtue of winning the Madrid Open, the Bryan brothers matched the record for most doubles titles won in the open era with 61 titles.
- Argentina defeated the United States in the World Team Cup final.
- Mikhail Youzhny, Albert Montañés, Anastasija Sevastova, Richard Gasquet, Alexandra Dulgheru, and Maria Sharapova also won titles.

Championship	Category	Champion(s)	Finalist(s)	Score in the final
Madrid (May 7–16)	Men's singles	(Spain) Rafael Nadal	(Switzerland) Roger Federer	6–4, 7–6(5)
Madrid (May 7–16)	Women's singles	(France) Aravane Rezaï	(United States) Venus Williams	6–2, 7–5
Madrid (May 7–16)	Men's doubles	(United States) Bob Bryan (United States) Mike Bryan	(Canada) Daniel Nestor (Serbia) Nenad Zimonjić	6–3, 6–4
Madrid (May 7–16)	Women's doubles	(United States) Serena Williams (United States) Venus Williams	(Argentina) Gisela Dulko (Italy) Flavia Pennetta	6–2, 7–5

=== June ===
- Justine Henin's record-tying streak of 40 consecutive sets won at the French Open was broken by Russian, Maria Sharapova, in the third round.(Occurred in May)
- Roger Federer's open era record of 23 consecutive Grand Slam semifinals came to an end when he lost to Robin Söderling in the quarterfinals of the French Open.
- Francesca Schiavone became the first Italian woman in the Open Era to reach the semifinal and final of and to win a Grand Slam at the French Open.
- By winning the 2010 French Open, Rafael Nadal became the first man to qualify for the 2010 ATP World Tour Finals, as well as becoming the first man to complete 'the Clay Slam', by winning all 3 Masters 1000 titles (Monte Carlo, Rome and Madrid), as well as the French Open, in the same calendar year.
- Serena Williams became the sixth woman to hold the number one rankings in both singles and doubles (with Venus Williams). It is also the first time in the Open Era that the number one ranked doubles team holds the first and second ranks in singles. The pair also became the third partnership in the women's game to hold all four Grand Slam titles at the same time.
- Lleyton Hewitt, Sam Querrey, Li Na, Sergiy Stakhovsky, Michaël Llodra, Ekaterina Makarova, and Justine Henin also won titles.

=== July ===
- John Isner defeated Nicolas Mahut 6–4, 3–6, 6–7(7), 7–6(3), 70–68 in the longest match in tennis history in the first round of Wimbledon. The match broke numerous records and was played over a course of three days. (Occurred in June)
- Rafael Nadal won his 14th consecutive match at Wimbledon to earn his second Wimbledon title.
- Serena Williams won her 13th Grand Slam title at Wimbledon, her fourth at the Championships.
- Bob and Mike Bryan won their record 62nd doubles title as a team, surpassing The Woodies (Todd Woodbridge and Mark Woodforde), by defeating Eric Butorac and Jean-Julien Rojer in the final of the Farmers Classic.
- Mardy Fish, Ágnes Szávay(2), Aravane Rezaï, Albert Montañés, Nicolás Almagro(2), Kaia Kanepi, Andrey Golubev, Anna Chakvetadze, Julia Görges, and Juan Carlos Ferrero also won titles.

US Open Series Week	Date	Men's Events	Women's Events
1	July 19–25	Atlanta; 2010 Champion: (United States) Mardy Fish	No Series Event Held This Week
2	July 26 – Aug 1	Los Angeles; 2010 Champion: (United States) Sam Querrey	Stanford; 2010 Champion: (Belarus) Victoria Azarenka

=== August ===
- Andy Roddick dropped to number eleven on August 8, and for the first time ever, no U.S. men were ranked inside the top ten on the ATP Tour.
- For the first time since 1976 the top two ranked men in the world teamed up in a doubles event. Rafael Nadal and Novak Djokovic played together at the 2010 Rogers Cup.
- Roger Federer became the second man to qualify for the ATP World Tour Finals.
- Andy Murray and Caroline Wozniacki were the 2010 US Open Series champions.
- Caroline Wozniacki won the inaugural e-Boks Danish Open.

US Open Series Week	Date	Men's Events	Women's Events
3	Aug 2–8	Washington, D.C. 2010 Champion: (Argentina) David Nalbandian	San Diego; 2010 Champion: (Russia) Svetlana Kuznetsova
4	Aug 9–15	Toronto; 2010 Champion: (United Kingdom) Andy Murray	Cincinnati; 2010 Champion: (Belgium) Kim Clijsters
5	Aug 16–22	Cincinnati; 2010 Champion: (Switzerland) Roger Federer	Montreal; 2010 Champion: (Denmark) Caroline Wozniacki
6	Aug 23–29	New Haven; 2010 Champion: (Ukraine) Sergiy Stakhovsky	New Haven; 2010 Champion: (Denmark) Caroline Wozniacki

=== September ===
- Rafael Nadal became the seventh man to win the career Grand Slam by defeating Novak Djokovic in the US Open final.
- Kim Clijsters won her 21st consecutive match at the US Open to successfully defend her 2009 title.
- Vania King and Yaroslava Shvedova won the doubles event at the US Open, accumulating an impressive 12–0 record at Grand Slam tournaments.
- The United States, Austrian, German, Swedish, Indian, Belgian, Kazakhstani, and Romanian Davis Cup teams won spots in the 2011 World Group.
- After an eight-month hiatus due to a wrist injury, 2009 US Open champ, Juan Martín del Potro, returned to the tour at the 2010 PTT Thailand Open.
- Caroline Wozniacki became the first woman to qualify for the WTA Tour Championships en route to her victory at the Toray Pan Pacific Open.
- Jarmila Groth, Tamira Paszek, Gilles Simon, Juan Ignacio Chela, Alisa Kleybanova, Alla Kudryavtseva, Guillermo García López, and Mikhail Youzhny also won titles.

=== October ===
- Serena Williams, Kim Clijsters, and Vera Zvonareva became the next group of women to qualify for the WTA Tour Championships. Four days later, Francesca Schiavone and Samantha Stosur also qualified for the event. Venus Williams would have also qualified, but announced that her knee injury would keep her from competing for the remainder of the year. Three days after Schiavone and Stosur gained entry, Jelena Janković and Elena Dementieva rounded up the elite eight. On October 19, Serena Williams stated that because of a foot injury, she would not be able to compete in the event. By winning the Kremlin Cup, Victoria Azarenka became the final qualifier for the Championships.
- Novak Djokovic became the third man to qualify for the ATP World Tour Finals. The following two weeks, Andy Murray and Robin Söderling also qualified.
- For the first time in 2010, all twenty of the top twenty ranked men competed in the same tournament at the Shanghai Masters. Andy Murray was the champion at the penultimate ATP World Tour Masters 1000 tournament.
- Rafael Nadal, Ana Ivanovic, Tamarine Tanasugarn, Viktor Troicki, Roger Federer, Roberta Vinci, Mikhail Kukushkin, Jürgen Melzer, and Gaël Monfils also won titles.

Championship	Category	Champion(s)	Finalist(s)	Score in the final
Beijing (October 4–10)	Men's singles	(Serbia) Novak Djokovic	(Spain) David Ferrer	6–2, 6–4
Beijing (October 4–10)	Women's singles	(Denmark) Caroline Wozniacki	(Russia) Vera Zvonareva	6–3, 3–6, 6–3
Beijing (October 4–10)	Men's doubles	(United States) Bob Bryan (United States) Mike Bryan	(Poland) Mariusz Fyrstenberg (Poland) Marcin Matkowski	6–1, 7–6(5)
Beijing (October 4–10)	Women's doubles	(Chinese Taipei) Chuang Chia-jung (Belarus) Olga Govortsova	(Argentina) Gisela Dulko (Italy) Flavia Pennetta	7–6(2), 1–6, 10–7

Championship	Category	Champion(s)	Finalist(s)	Score in the final
Tour Championships – Doha (October 26–31)	Women's singles	(Belgium) Kim Clijsters	(Denmark) Caroline Wozniacki	6–3, 5–7, 6–3
Tour Championships – Doha (October 26–31)	Women's doubles	(Argentina) Gisela Dulko (Italy) Flavia Pennetta	(Czech Republic) Květa Peschke (Slovenia) Katarina Srebotnik	7–5, 6–4

=== November ===
- Italy won its second consecutive Fed Cup final, defeating the United States 3–1.
- Tomáš Berdych, David Ferrer, and Andy Roddick were the final qualifiers for the ATP World Tour Finals.
- David Ferrer, Roger Federer, and Robin Söderling also won titles.

Championship	Category	Champion(s)	Finalist(s)	Score in the final
Tournament of Champions – Bali (November 4–7)	Women's singles	(Serbia) Ana Ivanovic	(Russia) Alisa Kleybanova	6–2, 7–6(5)

Championship	Category	Champion(s)	Finalist(s)	Score in the final
ATP World Tour Finals – London (November 21–28)	Men's singles	(Switzerland) Roger Federer	(Spain) Rafael Nadal	6–3, 3–6, 6–1
ATP World Tour Finals – London (November 21–28)	Men's doubles	(Canada) Daniel Nestor (Serbia) Nenad Zimonjić	(India) Mahesh Bhupathi (Belarus) Max Mirnyi	7–6(6), 6–4

=== December ===
- The 2010 WTA Awards were awarded on December 1 at a press conference in St. Petersburg, Florida. Kim Clijsters was voted Player of the Year while Gisela Dulko and Flavia Pennetta were voted Doubles Team of the Year. Other winners included Petra Kvitová, Justine Henin, Elena Dementieva, and Maria Sharapova.
- Novak Djokovic led Serbia to the country's first ever Davis Cup victory, after defeating France 3–2.
- Rafael Nadal and Caroline Wozniacki, the year-end world number ones, were named the ITF World Champions for 2010.

== International Tennis Hall of Fame ==
- Class of 2010:
  - Mark Woodforde, player
  - Natasha Zvereva, player
  - Derek Hardwick, contributor
  - Brad Parks, contributor
