= 2010 Western & Southern Financial Group Women's Open – Singles =

Singles
- 2010 Western & Southern Financial Group Women's Open

Final
- Champion: (Belgium) Kim Clijsters
- Runner-up: (Russia) Maria Sharapova
- Score: 2–6, 7–6^{(7–4)}, 6–2

Details
- Draw: 56 (3WC/12Q)
- Seeds: 16

Events
Singles	Doubles
- Cincinnati Open

Kim Clijsters defeated Maria Sharapova in the final, 2–6, 7–6^{(7–4)}, 6–2 to win the women's singles tennis title at the 2010 Cincinnati Masters. She saved three championship points en route to the title. It was Sharapova's second final defeat in as many weeks, having lost the Stanford final to Victoria Azarenka just two weeks earlier.

Jelena Janković was the defending champion, but lost in the third round to Akgul Amanmuradova.

Ana Ivanovic, ranked as the world No. 62 entering the tournament, upset Azarenka in the first round, having trailed 2–6, 2–5 before fighting back to win the match, 2–6, 7–6^{(8–6)}, 6–2. She then went on to make her third semifinal of the year, being forced to retire against Clijsters after injuring her foot.

== Seeds ==
The top eight seeds receive a bye into the second round.

1. (Serbia) Jelena Janković (third round)
2. (Denmark) Caroline Wozniacki (third round)
3. (Russia) Elena Dementieva (second round)
4. (Belgium) Kim Clijsters (champion)
5. (Italy) Francesca Schiavone (second round)
6. (Russia) Vera Zvonareva (third round)
7. (Poland) Agnieszka Radwańska (third round)
8. (China) Li Na (third round)
9. (Belarus) Victoria Azarenka (first round)
10. (Russia) Maria Sharapova (final)
11. (Italy) Flavia Pennetta (quarterfinals)
12. (Belgium) Yanina Wickmayer (quarterfinals)
13. (Israel) Shahar Pe'er (third round)
14. (France) Aravane Rezaï (first round)
15. (Russia) Nadia Petrova (first round, retired due to heat illness)
16. (France) Marion Bartoli (quarterfinals)

== Main draw ==
Key

- Q = Qualifier
- WC = Wild card
- LL = Lucky loser
- Alt = Alternate
- ITF = ITF entry
- PR = Protected ranking
- SR = Special ranking
- SE = Special exempt
- JE = Junior exempt
- JR = Junior Accelerator Programme entrant
- CO = College Accelerator Programme entrant
- NG = Next Gen Accelerator Program entrant
- w/o = Walkover
- r = Retired
- d = Defaulted

=== Finals ===
Quarterfinals
Q	(Uzbekistan) Akgul Amanmuradova	1	3
(Serbia) Ana Ivanovic	6	6
4	(Belgium) Kim Clijsters	7^{8}	6
11	(Italy) Flavia Pennetta	6^{6}	4
12	(Belgium) Yanina Wickmayer	5	6	1
(Russia) Anastasia Pavlyuchenkova	7	3	6
10	(Russia) Maria Sharapova	6	6
16	(France) Marion Bartoli	1	4

Semifinals
(Serbia) Ana Ivanovic	1^{r}
4	(Belgium) Kim Clijsters	2
(Russia) Anastasia Pavlyuchenkova	4	6	2
10	(Russia) Maria Sharapova	6	3	6

Final
4	(Belgium) Kim Clijsters	2	7^{7}	6
10	(Russia) Maria Sharapova	6	6^{4}	2

=== Top half ===
==== Section 1 ====
First round
Q	(Russia) V Dushevina	6	7
Q	(Australia) A Rodionova	2	6^{7}
Q	(Japan) K Date-Krumm	1	2
Q	(Uzbekistan) A Amanmuradova	6	6
Q	(Serbia) B Jovanovski	4	6	6
14	(France) A Rezaï	6	3	4
9	(Belarus) V Azarenka	6	6^{6}	2
(Serbia) A Ivanovic	2	7	6
(Kazakhstan) Y Shvedova	7	6
Q	(Russia) A Kudryavtseva	5	4
(Russia) E Vesnina	6	6
(United States) M Oudin	2	3

Second round
1	(Serbia) J Janković	6	3	6
Q	(Russia) V Dushevina	4	6	1
Q	(Uzbekistan) A Amanmuradova	6	6
Q	(Serbia) B Jovanovski	2	0
(Serbia) A Ivanovic	6	7
(Kazakhstan) Y Shvedova	1	5
(Russia) E Vesnina	6	6
5	(Italy) F Schiavone	4	4

Third round
1	(Serbia) J Janković	6^{3}	4
Q	(Uzbekistan) A Amanmuradova	7	6
(Serbia) A Ivanovic	6	6
(Russia) E Vesnina	0	3

Quarterfinals
Q	(Uzbekistan) A Amanmuradova	1	3
(Serbia) A Ivanovic	6	6

==== Section 2 ====
First round
(Russia) D Safina	7	6
(Italy) R Vinci	5	4
Q	(Japan) A Morita	7	6
(Spain) A Parra Santonja	6^{7}	2
WC	(United States) C McHale	7	5
15	(Russia) N Petrova	6^{4}	3	r
11	(Italy) F Pennetta	6	6
(China) J Zheng	4	2
Q	(Romania) M Niculescu	6	6
(Germany) S Lisicki	3	0
(Russia) M Kirilenko	6	6
(Ukraine) K Bondarenko	1	3

Second round
4	(Belgium) K Clijsters	7	6
(Russia) D Safina	5	2
Q	(Japan) A Morita	2	4
WC	(United States) C McHale	6	6
11	(Italy) F Pennetta	6	6
Q	(Romania) M Niculescu	0	1
(Russia) M Kirilenko	5	6	6^{2}
6	(Russia) V Zvonareva	7	2	7

Third round
4	(Belgium) K Clijsters	6	6
WC	(United States) C McHale	1	1
11	(Italy) F Pennetta	6	6
6	(Russia) V Zvonareva	4	3

Quarterfinals
4	(Belgium) K Clijsters	7	6
11	(Italy) F Pennetta	6^{6}	4

=== Bottom half ===
==== Section 3 ====
First round
WC	(United States) J Hampton	4	2
(Italy) S Errani	6	6
(Argentina) G Dulko	6	6
(Czech Republic) L Šafářová	4	3
Q	(Hungary) G Arn	2	2
12	(Belgium) Y Wickmayer	6	6
13	(Israel) S Pe'er	6	4
(Belarus) O Govortsova	3	1	r
Q	(United States) V King	6	3	1
Q	(Spain) N Llagostera Vives	3	6	6
(Slovakia) D Hantuchová	3	4
(Russia) A Pavlyuchenkova	6	6

Second round
8	(China) N Li	6	6
(Italy) S Errani	2	2
(Argentina) G Dulko	6^{3}	2
12	(Belgium) Y Wickmayer	7	6
13	(Israel) S Pe'er	6	6
Q	(Spain) N Llagostera Vives	3	2
(Russia) A Pavlyuchenkova	6	6
3	(Russia) E Dementieva	1	3

Third round
8	(China) N Li	6	2	6^{4}
12	(Belgium) Y Wickmayer	2	6	7
13	(Israel) S Pe'er	7	4	4
(Russia) A Pavlyuchenkova	5	6	6

Quarterfinals
12	(Belgium) Y Wickmayer	5	6	1
(Russia) A Pavlyuchenkova	7	3	6

==== Section 4 ====
First round
(Russia) A Kleybanova	6	6
(Romania) A Dulgheru	4	4
(Germany) A Petkovic	7	6
WC	(United States) C Vandeweghe	6^{1}	1
(Russia) S Kuznetsova	4	6	2
10	(Russia) M Sharapova	6	1	6
16	(France) M Bartoli	6	6
(Spain) A Medina Garrigues	4	0
(Slovakia) D Cibulková	6	2	3
(Ukraine) A Bondarenko	3	6	6
(Austria) S Bammer	7	6
Q	(Romania) S Cîrstea	6^{5}	2

Second round
7	(Poland) A Radwańska	6	6
(Russia) A Kleybanova	4	2
(Germany) A Petkovic	3	1
10	(Russia) M Sharapova	6	6
16	(France) M Bartoli	7	6
(Ukraine) A Bondarenko	6^{4}	1
(Austria) S Bammer	0	2
2	(Denmark) C Wozniacki	6	6

Third round
7	(Poland) A Radwańska	2	3
10	(Russia) M Sharapova	6	6
16	(France) M Bartoli	6	6
2	(Denmark) C Wozniacki	4	1

Quarterfinals
10	(Russia) M Sharapova	6	6
16	(France) M Bartoli	1	4

== Qualifying ==
=== Qualifying seeds ===
1. (Estonia) Kaia Kanepi (first round)
2. (Italy) ~~Roberta Vinci~~ (moved to the main draw)
3. (United Kingdom) Elena Baltacha (first round)
4. (Japan) Kimiko Date-Krumm (qualified)
5. (Romania) Sorana Cîrstea (qualified)
6. (Russia) Ekaterina Makarova (qualifying competition)
7. (Australia) Anastasia Rodionova (qualified)
8. (Russia) Vera Dushevina (qualified)
9. (Chinese Taipei) Chan Yung-jan (qualifying competition, retired due to dizziness)
10. (United States) Vania King (qualified)
11. (Japan) Ayumi Morita (qualified)
12. (South Africa) Chanelle Scheepers (qualifying competition)
13. (Croatia) Karolina Šprem (first round)
14. (Russia) Alla Kudryavtseva (qualified)
15. (Romania) Simona Halep (qualifying competition)
16. (Serbia) Bojana Jovanovski (qualified)
17. (Romania) Edina Gallovits (first round)
18. (United States) Jill Craybas (qualifying competition)
19. (Japan) Kurumi Nara (qualifying competition)
20. (Romania) Monica Niculescu (qualified)
21. (Hungary) Gréta Arn (qualified)
22. (United States) Varvara Lepchenko (qualifying competition)
23. (France) Julie Coin (qualifying competition)
24. (United States) Shenay Perry (first round)
25. (Uzbekistan) Akgul Amanmuradova (qualified)

=== Qualifiers ===
1. (Spain) Nuria Llagostera Vives
2. (Uzbekistan) Akgul Amanmuradova
3. (Serbia) Bojana Jovanovski
4. (Japan) Kimiko Date-Krumm
5. (Romania) Sorana Cîrstea
6. (Russia) Alla Kudryavtseva
7. (Australia) Anastasia Rodionova
8. (Russia) Vera Dushevina
9. (Romania) Monica Niculescu
10. (United States) Vania King
11. (Japan) Ayumi Morita
12. (Hungary) Gréta Arn

=== Qualifying draw ===
==== First qualifier ====
First round
1	(Estonia) Kaia Kanepi	4	6	2
WC	(Chinese Taipei) Hsieh Su-wei	6	1	6
(Spain) Nuria Llagostera Vives	6	6
24	(United States) Shenay Perry	2	2

Qualifying competition
WC	(Chinese Taipei) Hsieh Su-wei	7^{7}	6^{7}	2
(Spain) Nuria Llagostera Vives	6^{3}	7^{9}	6

==== Second qualifier ====
First round
25	(Uzbekistan) Akgul Amanmuradova	6	6
(Georgia (country)) Anna Tatishvili	4	2
(United States) Madison Brengle	2	6	3
22	(United States) Varvara Lepchenko	6	1	6

Qualifying competition
25	(Uzbekistan) Akgul Amanmuradova	7^{7}	6
22	(United States) Varvara Lepchenko	6^{2}	4

==== Third qualifier ====
First round
3	(United Kingdom) Elena Baltacha	6	3	6^{5}
(United States) Julie Ditty	4	6	7^{7}
(India) Sania Mirza	5	6	3
16	(Serbia) Bojana Jovanovski	7	4	6

Qualifying competition
(United States) Julie Ditty	3	3
16	(Serbia) Bojana Jovanovski	6	6

==== Fourth qualifier ====
First round
4	(Japan) Kimiko Date-Krumm	6	7^{7}
WC	(Zimbabwe) Cara Black	3	6^{3}
(Ukraine) Tetiana Luzhanska	4	3
18	(United States) Jill Craybas	6	6

Qualifying competition
4	(Japan) Kimiko Date-Krumm	7^{7}	6
18	(United States) Jill Craybas	6^{5}	3

==== Fifth qualifier ====
First round
5	(Romania) Sorana Cîrstea	6	6
WC	(United States) Danielle Mills	3	2
WC	(Latvia) Līga Dekmeijere	4	1
15	(Romania) Simona Halep	6	6

Qualifying competition
5	(Romania) Sorana Cîrstea	6	6
15	(Romania) Simona Halep	2	4

==== Sixth qualifier ====
First round
6	(Russia) Ekaterina Makarova	6	6
(United States) Alexandra Stevenson	4	2
(United States) Carly Gullickson	5	4
14	(Russia) Alla Kudryavtseva	7	6

Qualifying competition
6	(Russia) Ekaterina Makarova	3	3
14	(Russia) Alla Kudryavtseva	6	6

==== Seventh qualifier ====
First round
7	(Australia) Anastasia Rodionova	6	6
(Austria) Tamira Paszek	3	4
(Ukraine) Olga Savchuk	5	6^{4}
23	(France) Julie Coin	7	7^{7}

Qualifying competition
7	(Australia) Anastasia Rodionova	6	6
23	(France) Julie Coin	1	3

==== Eighth qualifier ====
First round
8	(Russia) Vera Dushevina	7^{7}	6
WC	(South Africa) Natalie Grandin	6^{2}	1
(Netherlands) Michaëlla Krajicek	6	7
17	(Romania) Edina Gallovits	0	5

Qualifying competition
8	(Russia) Vera Dushevina	7^{7}	6
(Netherlands) Michaëlla Krajicek	6^{1}	3

==== Ninth qualifier ====
First round
9	(Chinese Taipei) Chan Yung-jan	6	7^{7}
WC	(United States) Ashley Harkleroad	2	6^{4}
(Colombia) Mariana Duque Mariño	2	3
20	(Romania) Monica Niculescu	6	6

Qualifying competition
9	(Chinese Taipei) Chan Yung-jan	0	0^{r}
20	(Romania) Monica Niculescu	6	0

==== Tenth qualifier ====
First round
10	(United States) Vania King	7^{8}	6
(United States) Alison Riske	6^{6}	2
(Poland) Urszula Radwańska	2	2
19	(Japan) Kurumi Nara	6	6

Qualifying competition
10	(United States) Vania King	6	6
19	(Japan) Kurumi Nara	1	2

==== Eleventh qualifier ====
First round
11	(Japan) Ayumi Morita	6	6
(Kazakhstan) Sesil Karatantcheva	4	4
(Czech Republic) Lucie Hradecká	7	6
13	(Croatia) Karolina Šprem	5	1

Qualifying competition
11	(Japan) Ayumi Morita	6	6
(Czech Republic) Lucie Hradecká	4	0

==== Twelfth qualifier ====
First round
12	(South Africa) Chanelle Scheepers	6	7
WC	(United States) Julia Boserup	2	5
WC	(United States) Chelsey Gullickson	6^{1}	3
21	(Hungary) Gréta Arn	7^{7}	6

Qualifying competition
12	(South Africa) Chanelle Scheepers	3	4
21	(Hungary) Gréta Arn	6	6
