= 2010 Bank of the West Classic – Singles =

Singles
- 2010 Bank of the West Classic

Final
- Champion: (Belarus) Victoria Azarenka
- Runner-up: (Russia) Maria Sharapova
- Score: 6–4, 6–1

Details
- Draw: 30
- Seeds: 8

Events
Singles	Doubles
- Bank of the West Classic

Marion Bartoli was the defending champion, but lost to Victoria Azarenka in the quarterfinals.

Azarenka went on to win the title, defeating Maria Sharapova in the final 6–4, 6–1.

== Seeds ==
The top two seeds receive a bye into the second round.

1. (Australia) Samantha Stosur (semifinals)
2. (Russia) Elena Dementieva (quarterfinals)
3. (Poland) Agnieszka Radwańska (semifinals)
4. (France) Marion Bartoli (quarterfinals)
5. (Russia) Maria Sharapova (final)
6. (Israel) Shahar Pe'er (second round)
7. (Belgium) Yanina Wickmayer (quarterfinals)
8. (Belarus) Victoria Azarenka (champion)

== Main draw ==
Key

- Q = Qualifier
- WC = Wild card
- LL = Lucky loser
- Alt = Alternate
- ITF = ITF entry
- PR = Protected ranking
- SR = Special ranking
- SE = Special exempt
- JE = Junior exempt
- JR = Junior Accelerator Programme entrant
- CO = College Accelerator Programme entrant
- NG = Next Gen Accelerator Program entrant
- w/o = Walkover
- r = Retired
- d = Defaulted

=== Finals ===
Semifinals
1	(Australia) Samantha Stosur	2	3
8/WC	(Belarus) Victoria Azarenka	6	6
3	(Poland) Agnieszka Radwańska	6	2	2
5	(Russia) Maria Sharapova	1	6	6

Final
8/WC	(Belarus) Victoria Azarenka	6	6
5	(Russia) Maria Sharapova	4	1

=== Top half ===
First round
Q	(United States) C McHale	3	6	6
Q	(Chinese Taipei) K-c Chang	6	0	2
(Slovakia) D Cibulková	6	6
WC	(United States) H Barte	2	2
(Chinese Taipei) Y-j Chan	3	1
7	(Belgium) Y Wickmayer	6	6
4	(France) M Bartoli	6	6
PR	(United States) A Harkleroad	1	4
(Russia) A Kleybanova	3	2
WC	(Serbia) A Ivanovic	6	6
(United States) M Oudin	6^{6}	7	6
(Canada) A Wozniak	7	5	3
(Japan) A Morita	0	2
8/WC	(Belarus) V Azarenka	6	6

Second round
1	(Australia) S Stosur	6	7
Q	(United States) C McHale	1	5
(Slovakia) D Cibulková	1	4
7	(Belgium) Y Wickmayer	6	6
4	(France) M Bartoli	6	6
WC	(Serbia) A Ivanovic	3	4
(United States) M Oudin	3	1
8/WC	(Belarus) V Azarenka	6	6

Quarterfinals
1	(Australia) S Stosur	7	3	6
7	(Belgium) Y Wickmayer	5	6	3
4	(France) M Bartoli	6	3	3
8/WC	(Belarus) V Azarenka	3	6	6

Semifinals
1	(Australia) S Stosur	2	3
8/WC	(Belarus) V Azarenka	6	6

=== Bottom half ===
First round
6	(Israel) S Pe'er	0	6	6
(Slovakia) D Hantuchová	6	4	3
(Russia) M Kirilenko	6	6
Q	(Croatia) M Lučić	1	4
Q	(Ukraine) O Savchuk	6	6
(United States) J Craybas	3	3
(South Africa) C Scheepers	5	6	3
3	(Poland) A Radwańska	7	4	6
5	(Russia) M Sharapova	6	7
(China) J Zheng	4	5
(Russia) A Kudryavtseva	1	1
(Belarus) O Govortsova	6	6
(Japan) K Date-Krumm	4	7	6
WC	(Russia) D Safina	6	6^{0}	2

Second round
6	(Israel) S Pe'er	4	3
(Russia) M Kirilenko	6	6
Q	(Ukraine) O Savchuk	6^{4}	2
3	(Poland) A Radwańska	7	6
5	(Russia) M Sharapova	6	6
(Belarus) O Govortsova	3	3
(Japan) K Date-Krumm	6	3	4
2	(Russia) E Dementieva	3	6	6

Quarterfinals
(Russia) M Kirilenko	5	0
3	(Poland) A Radwańska	7	6
5	(Russia) M Sharapova	6	2	6
2	(Russia) E Dementieva	4	6	3

Semifinals
3	(Poland) A Radwańska	6	2	2
5	(Russia) M Sharapova	1	6	6
