= 2010 Bank of the West Classic – Doubles =

Doubles
- 2010 Bank of the West Classic

Final
- Champions: (United States) Lindsay Davenport (United States) Liezel Huber
- Runners-up: (Chinese Taipei) Chan Yung-jan (China) Zheng Jie
- Score: 7–5, 6–7^{(8–10)}, [10–8]

Details
- Draw: 16
- Seeds: 4

Events
Singles	Doubles
← 2009 ·	Bank of the West Classic	· 2011 →

Serena Williams and Venus Williams were the defending champions, but chose not to compete.
Lindsay Davenport and Liezel Huber won in the final against Chan Yung-jan and Zheng Jie, 7–5, 6–7^{(8–10)}, [10–8].

== Seeds ==
1. (United States) Lisa Raymond / (Australia) Rennae Stubbs (first round)
2. (Chinese Taipei) Chan Yung-jan / (China) Zheng Jie (final)
3. (Russia) Alisa Kleybanova / (Israel) Shahar Pe'er (quarterfinals)
4. (Belarus) Olga Govortsova / (Russia) Alla Kudryavtseva (quarterfinals)

== Draw ==
=== Key ===
- Q = Qualifier
- WC = Wild card
- LL = Lucky loser
- Alt = Alternate
- SE = Special exempt
- PR = Protected ranking
- ITF = ITF entry
- JE = Junior exempt
- w/o = Walkover
- r = Retired
- d = Defaulted
- SR = Special ranking

=== Draw ===
First round
1	(United States) L Raymond (Australia) R Stubbs	0	6	[10]
(United Kingdom) S Borwell (United States) R Kops-Jones	6	4	[12]
(Latvia) L Dekmeijere (Canada) M-È Pelletier	5	6	[6]
(United States) L Osterloh (United States) R Zalameda	7	2	[10]
4	(Belarus) O Govortsova (Russia) A Kudryavtseva	2	6	[10]
(United States) S Perry (South Africa) C Scheepers	6	4	[5]
(Netherlands) M Krajicek (United States) M Oudin	4	2
WC	(United States) L Davenport (United States) L Huber	6	6
(Slovakia) D Hantuchová (Belgium) Y Wickmayer	1	5
(Belarus) V Azarenka (Russia) M Kirilenko	6	7
(United States) B Mattek-Sands (United States) M Shaughnessy	2	7^{7}	[4]
3	(Russia) A Kleybanova (Israel) S Pe'er	6	6^{1}	[10]
(Ukraine) O Savchuk (United States) M Washington	6	2	[4]
(United States) J Craybas (United States) C Gullickson	3	6	[10]
(South Africa) N Grandin (United States) A Spears	1	3
2	(Chinese Taipei) Y-j Chan (China) J Zheng	6	6

Quarterfinals
(United Kingdom) S Borwell (United States) R Kops-Jones	4	6	[10]
(United States) L Osterloh (United States) R Zalameda	6	3	[6]
4	(Belarus) O Govortsova (Russia) A Kudryavtseva	4	2
WC	(United States) L Davenport (United States) L Huber	6	6
(Belarus) V Azarenka (Russia) M Kirilenko	6	4	[10]
3	(Russia) A Kleybanova (Israel) S Pe'er	3	6	[3]
(United States) J Craybas (United States) C Gullickson	0	0
2	(Chinese Taipei) Y-j Chan (China) J Zheng	6	6

Semifinals
(United Kingdom) S Borwell (United States) R Kops-Jones	0^{r}
WC	(United States) L Davenport (United States) L Huber	1
(Belarus) V Azarenka (Russia) M Kirilenko	2	6	[4]
2	(Chinese Taipei) Y-j Chan (China) J Zheng	6	3	[10]

Finals
WC	(United States) L Davenport (United States) L Huber	7	6^{8}	[10]
2	(Chinese Taipei) Y-j Chan (China) J Zheng	5	7^{10}	[8]
