= 2010 Western & Southern Financial Group Women's Open – Doubles =

Doubles
- 2010 Western & Southern Financial Group Women's Open

Final
- Champions: (Belarus) Victoria Azarenka; (Russia) Maria Kirilenko
- Runners-up: (United States) Lisa Raymond; (Australia) Rennae Stubbs
- Score: 7–6^{(7–4)}, 7–6^{(7–8)}

Details
- Seeds: 8

Events
Singles	Doubles
← 2009 ·	Western & Southern Financial Group Women's Open	· 2011 →

Cara Black and Liezel Huber were the defending champions. Both were present that year, but chose to compete with different players.
Black partnered with Anastasia Rodionova but lost 6–4, 6–4 in quarterfinals against Gisela Dulko and Flavia Pennetta. Huber partnered with Nadia Petrova but lost 7–5, 6–2 in semifinals against Lisa Raymond and Rennae Stubbs.
Victoria Azarenka and Maria Kirilenko won 7–6^{(7–4)}, 7–6^{(7–8)} in the final against Lisa Raymond and Rennae Stubbs.

== Seeds ==
The top four seeds receive a bye into the second round.

1. (United States) Liezel Huber / (Russia) Nadia Petrova (semifinals)
2. (Argentina) Gisela Dulko / (Italy) Flavia Pennetta (semifinals)
3. (Czech Republic) Květa Peschke / (Slovenia) Katarina Srebotnik (second round)
4. (United States) Lisa Raymond / (Australia) Rennae Stubbs (final)
5. (United States) Vania King / (Kazakhstan) Yaroslava Shvedova (second round)
6. (Russia) Alisa Kleybanova / (Russia) Ekaterina Makarova (first round)
7. (Chinese Taipei) Chan Yung-jan / (China) Zheng Jie (quarterfinals)
8. (Zimbabwe) Cara Black / (Australia) Anastasia Rodionova (quarterfinals)

== Draw ==
=== Key ===
- Q = Qualifier
- WC = Wild card
- LL = Lucky loser
- Alt = Alternate
- SE = Special exempt
- PR = Protected ranking
- ITF = ITF entry
- JE = Junior exempt
- w/o = Walkover
- r = Retired
- d = Defaulted
- SR = Special ranking

=== Finals ===
Semifinals

Final

1
- (United States) Liezel Huber
- (Russia) Nadia Petrova
5
2

4
- (United States) Lisa Raymond
- (Australia) Rennae Stubbs
7
6

4
- (United States) Lisa Raymond
- (Australia) Rennae Stubbs
6^{4}
6^{8}

- (Belarus) Victoria Azarenka
- (Russia) Maria Kirilenko
7
7

- (Belarus) Victoria Azarenka
- (Russia) Maria Kirilenko
6
6

2
- (Argentina) Gisela Dulko
- (Italy) Flavia Pennetta
2
1

=== Top half ===
First round

Second round

Quarterfinals

Semifinals

1
- (United States) L Huber
- (Russia) N Petrova
5
6
[10]

- (Spain) A Medina Garrigues
- (China) Z Yan
2
7
[10]

- (Spain) A Medina Garrigues
- (China) Z Yan
7
3
[3]

- (Ukraine) A Bondarenko
- (Ukraine) K Bondarenko
6
5
[6]

1
- (United States) L Huber
- (Russia) N Petrova
6
6

- (Chinese Taipei) S-w Hsieh
- (Russia) A Kudryavtseva
6
6

7
- (Chinese Taipei) Y-j Chan
- (China) J Zheng
2
4

- (Italy) S Errani
- (Italy) R Vinci
1
3

- (Chinese Taipei) S-w Hsieh
- (Russia) A Kudryavtseva
2
1

- (Russia) M Kondratieva
- (Czech Republic) V Uhlířová
3
2

7
- (Chinese Taipei) Y-j Chan
- (China) J Zheng
6
6

7
- (Chinese Taipei) Y-j Chan
- (China) J Zheng
6
6

1
- (United States) L Huber
- (Russia) N Petrova
5
2

4
- (United States) L Raymond
- (Australia) R Stubbs
7
6

4
- (United States) L Raymond
- (Australia) R Stubbs
6
6

- (South Africa) N Grandin
- (United States) A Spears
6
6

- (South Africa) N Grandin
- (United States) A Spears
3
2

- (Chinese Taipei) C-j Chuang
- (Belarus) O Govortsova
2
3

4
- (United States) L Raymond
- (Australia) R Stubbs
6
6

- (United States) J Craybas
- (Romania) E Gallovits
4
6^{5}

WC
- (United States) Ca Gullickson
- (United States) Ch Gullickson
3
1

- (France) J Coin
- (Czech Republic) L Hradecká
6
7

- (France) J Coin
- (Czech Republic) L Hradecká
2
6
[5]

WC
- (United States) Ca Gullickson
- (United States) Ch Gullickson
3
6
[10]

WC
- (United States) Ca Gullickson
- (United States) Ch Gullickson
6
4
[10]

6
- (Russia) A Kleybanova
- (Russia) E Makarova
6
1
[8]

=== Bottom half ===
First round

Second round

Quarterfinals

Semifinals

5
- (United States) V King
- (Kazakhstan) Y Shvedova
6
6

- (Latvia) L Dekmeijere
- (United States) J Ditty
4
4

5
- (United States) V King
- (Kazakhstan) Y Shvedova
3
6
[6]

- (India) S Mirza
- (Romania) M Niculescu
6
7

- (India) S Mirza
- (Romania) M Niculescu
6
1
[10]

WC
- (United States) J Hampton
- (United States) M Oudin
4
6^{5}

- (India) S Mirza
- (Romania) M Niculescu
2
5

- (Belarus) V Azarenka
- (Russia) M Kirilenko
7
6

- (Belarus) V Azarenka
- (Russia) M Kirilenko
6
7

- (United States) R Kops-Jones
- (Poland) A Rosolska
5
1

- (Belarus) V Azarenka
- (Russia) M Kirilenko
6
6

3
- (Czech Republic) K Peschke
- (Slovenia) K Srebotnik
0
2

- (Belarus) V Azarenka
- (Russia) M Kirilenko
6
6

8
- (Zimbabwe) C Black
- (Australia) A Rodionova
6
6

2
- (Argentina) G Dulko
- (Italy) F Pennetta
2
1

- (Spain) N Llagostera Vives
- (Spain) A Parra Santonja
3
4

8
- (Zimbabwe) C Black
- (Australia) A Rodionova
6^{7}
6
[10]

- (United States) M Shaughnessy
- (Russia) E Vesnina
4
6
[10]

- (United States) M Shaughnessy
- (Russia) E Vesnina
7
1
[6]

- (Uzbekistan) A Amanmuradova
- (Russia) V Dushevina
6
4
[7]

8
- (Zimbabwe) C Black
- (Australia) A Rodionova
4
4

- (Canada) M-È Pelletier
- (Ukraine) O Savchuk
2
6
[5]

2
- (Argentina) G Dulko
- (Italy) F Pennetta
6
6

ALT
- (Slovakia) D Cibulková
- (Russia) A Pavlyuchenkova
6
4
[10]

ALT
- (Slovakia) D Cibulková
- (Russia) A Pavlyuchenkova
7
6^{3}
[10]

2
- (Argentina) G Dulko
- (Italy) F Pennetta
5
7
[12]
