= 2010 Western & Southern Financial Group Masters and Women's Open =

2010 Western & Southern Financial Group Masters and Western & Southern Financial Group Women's Open
- Date: August 14–22 (men); August 7–15 (women)
- Edition: 109th (men) / 82nd (women)
- Surface: Hard / Outdoor
- Location: Mason, Ohio, United States
- Venue: Lindner Family Tennis Center

Champions

Men's singles
- (Switzerland) Roger Federer

Women's singles
- (Belgium) Kim Clijsters

Men's doubles
- (United States) Bob Bryan / (United States) Mike Bryan

Women's doubles
- (Belarus) Victoria Azarenka / (Russia) Maria Kirilenko
- Western & Southern Financial Group Masters Western & Southern Financial Group Women's Open

The 2010 Cincinnati Masters (also known as the Western & Southern Financial Group Masters and Western & Southern Financial Group Women's Open for sponsorship reasons) was a tennis tournament that were played on outdoor hard courts at the Lindner Family Tennis Center in Mason, Ohio, United States, with the men playing from August 14 through August 22, 2010, and the women from August 7 through August 15, 2010. It was the 109th edition of the Cincinnati Masters (82nd for the women), and was part of the ATP Masters Series of the 2010 ATP World Tour, and of the Premier Series of the 2010 WTA Tour.

== Finals ==
=== Men's singles ===
(Switzerland) Roger Federer defeated (United States) Mardy Fish 6–7^{(5–7)}, 7–6^{(7–1)}, 6–4

- It was Federer's 2nd title of the year and 63rd of his career. It was his 4th win at the event also winning in 2005, 2007, and 2009. It was his 17th Masters 1000 title.

=== Women's singles ===
(Belgium) Kim Clijsters defeated (Russia) Maria Sharapova 2–6, 7–6^{(7–4)}, 6–2

- It was Clijsters' 3rd title of the year and 38th of her career.

=== Men's doubles ===
(United States) Bob Bryan / (United States) Mike Bryan defeated (India) Mahesh Bhupathi / (Belarus) Max Mirnyi 6–3, 6–4.

=== Women's doubles ===
(Belarus) Victoria Azarenka / (Russia) Maria Kirilenko defeated (United States) Lisa Raymond / (Australia) Rennae Stubbs 7–6^{(7–4)}, 7–6^{(10–8)}

== ATP entrants ==
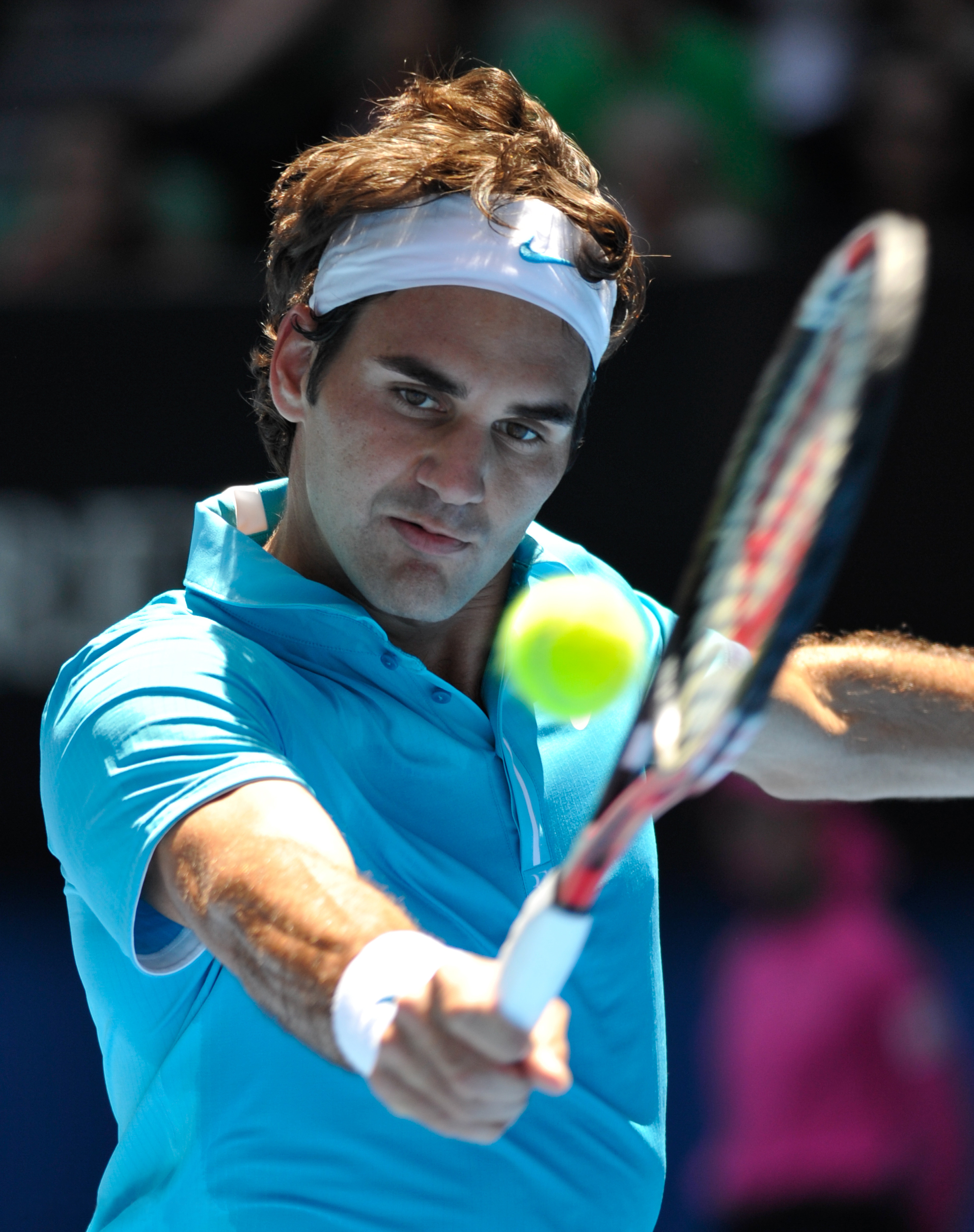
Roger Federer is the men's defending champion. He successfully defended his title.

=== Seeds ===
Country	Player	Rank^{[a]}	Seed^{[b]}
ESP	Rafael Nadal	1	1
SRB	Novak Djokovic	3	2
SUI	Roger Federer	2	3
GBR	Andy Murray	4	4
SWE	Robin Söderling	5	5
RUS	Nikolay Davydenko	6	6
CZE	Tomáš Berdych	7	7
ESP	Fernando Verdasco	9	8
USA	Andy Roddick	11	9
ESP	David Ferrer	12	10
CRO	Marin Čilić	13	11
RUS	Mikhail Youzhny	14	12
AUT	Jürgen Melzer	15	13
ESP	Nicolás Almagro	16	14
CRO	Ivan Ljubičić	17	15
FRA	Gaël Monfils	18	16

- Seedings are based on the rankings of August 9, 2010

=== Other entrants ===
The following players received wildcards into the singles main draw

- (United States) James Blake
- (United States) Mardy Fish
- (United States) Robby Ginepri
- (United States) Donald Young

The following players received entry from the qualifying draw:

- (Germany) Benjamin Becker
- (United States) Taylor Dent
- (India) Somdev Devvarman
- (Colombia) Alejandro Falla
- (Colombia) Santiago Giraldo
- (Uzbekistan) Denis Istomin
- (Germany) Florian Mayer

=== Notable withdrawals ===
- (Argentina) Juan Martín del Potro (wrist injury)
- (Spain) Juan Carlos Ferrero (flu)
- (Chile) Fernando González (calf)
- (Spain) Albert Montañés
- (France) Jo-Wilfried Tsonga (knee injury)

== WTA entrants ==
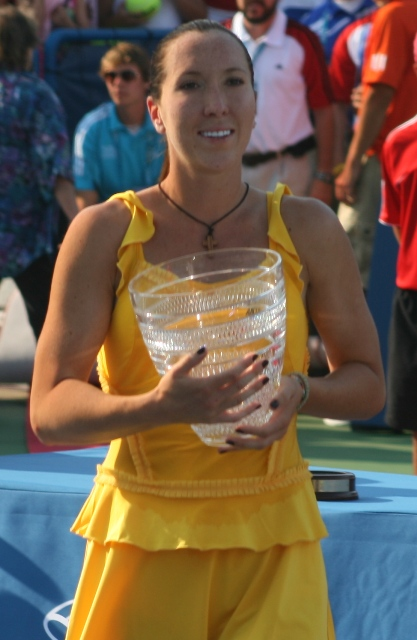
Jelena Janković was the women's defending champion

=== Seeds ===
Player	Nationality	Ranking*	Seed
Jelena Janković	Serbia	2	1
Caroline Wozniacki	Denmark	3	2
Elena Dementieva	Russia	6	3
Kim Clijsters	Belgium	7	4
Francesca Schiavone	Italy	8	5
Vera Zvonareva	Russia	9	6
Agnieszka Radwańska	Poland	10	7
Li Na	(China)	11	8
Victoria Azarenka	Belarus	12	9
Maria Sharapova	Russia	13	10
Flavia Pennetta	Italy	15	11
Yanina Wickmayer	Belgium	16	12
Shahar Pe'er	Israel	17	13
Aravane Rezaï	France	18	14
Nadia Petrova	Russia	19	15
Marion Bartoli	France	20	16

- Seedings are based on the rankings of August 2, 2010.

=== Other entrants ===
The following players received wildcards into the singles main draw

- (United States) Jamie Hampton
- (United States) Christina McHale
- (United States) Coco Vandeweghe

The following players received entry from the qualifying draw:

- (Uzbekistan) Akgul Amanmuradova
- (Hungary) Gréta Arn
- (Romania) Sorana Cîrstea
- (Japan) Kimiko Date-Krumm
- (Russia) Vera Dushevina
- (Serbia) Bojana Jovanovski
- (United States) Vania King
- (Russia) Alla Kudryavtseva
- (Spain) Nuria Llagostera Vives
- (Japan) Ayumi Morita
- (Romania) Monica Niculescu
- (Australia) Anastasia Rodionova

=== Notable withdrawals ===
- (Belgium) Justine Henin (elbow injury)
- (Australia) Samantha Stosur (shoulder injury)
- (United States) Serena Williams (foot surgery)
- (United States) Venus Williams (knee injury)
- (Spain) María José Martínez Sánchez (knee injury)

Preceded by Toronto	2010 US Open Series; Men's Events	Succeeded by New Haven
Preceded by San Diego	2010 US Open Series; Women's Events	Succeeded by Montreal
