= 2010 Mercury Insurance Open =

- Date: August 2–8
- Edition: 30th
- Category: WTA Premier
- Draw: 28S /16D
- Prize money: $700,000
- Surface: Hard / outdoor
- Location: San Diego, California, U.S.

Champions

Singles
- (Russia) Svetlana Kuznetsova

Doubles
- (Russia) Maria Kirilenko / (China) Zheng Jie
- Southern California Open

The 2010 Mercury Insurance Open was a women's tennis tournament played on outdoor hard courts. It was the first edition of the Southern California Open since the tournament left the tour in 2007. It was classified as one of the WTA Premier tournaments of the 2010 WTA Tour. It was played in San Diego, California, United States. Unseeded Svetlana Kuznetsova won the singles title.

== Finals ==
=== Singles ===
(Russia) Svetlana Kuznetsova defeated (Poland) Agnieszka Radwańska, 6–4, 6–7^{(7–9)}, 6–3

- It was Kuznetsova's only singles title of the year and 13th of her career.

=== Doubles ===
(Russia) Maria Kirilenko / (China) Zheng Jie defeated (United States) Lisa Raymond / (Australia) Rennae Stubbs, 6–4, 6–4

== WTA entrants ==
=== Seeds ===
Player	Nationality	Ranking*	Seed
Jelena Janković	Serbia	2	1
Samantha Stosur	Australia	5	2
Vera Zvonareva	Russia	9	3
Agnieszka Radwańska	Poland	11	4
Flavia Pennetta	Italy	12	5
Marion Bartoli	France	14	6
Shahar Pe'er	Israel	16	7
Yanina Wickmayer	Belgium	17	8

- Seedings are based on the rankings of July 26, 2010.

=== Other entrants ===
The following players received wildcards into the singles main draw:

- (Slovakia) Dominika Cibulková
- (Argentina) Gisela Dulko
- (Serbia) Ana Ivanovic

The following players received entry from the qualifying draw:

- (Japan) Kurumi Nara
- (United States) Shenay Perry
- (South Africa) Chanelle Scheepers
- (United States) CoCo Vandeweghe

The following player received entry by a lucky loser spot:

- (United States) Jamie Hampton

Preceded by Stanford	2010 US Open Series Women's Events	Succeeded by Cincinnati
