= 2010 US Open Series =

Tennis tournament

In tennis, the seventh edition of the US Open Series (known as Olympus US Open Series for sponsorships reasons), includes ten hard court tournaments that started on July 19, 2010, in Atlanta and ended in New Haven, Connecticut on August 29, 2010. This edition has scheduled five separate men's tournaments, four women's tournaments, and the Pilot Pen Tennis Tournament that will host both a men's and women's event. The series included two ATP World Tour Masters 1000 and two WTA Premier 5 events to headline the series.

== Point distribution for series events ==
To be included in the standings and subsequently the bonus prize money, a player had to have countable results from two different tournaments. Players finishing in the top three in the series can earn up to $1 million in extra prize money at the US Open. Roger Federer received the largest US Open pay day of $2.4 million in 2007 after capturing the title in both the US Open Series and the US Open championship.

Round	ATP Masters Series 1000 WTA Premier 5 Series	ATP World Tour 500/250 WTA Premier Series
Champion	100	70
Finalist	70	45
Semifinalist	45	25
Quarterfinalist	25	15
Round of 16	15	0

== US Open Series standings ==
The final standings below include all players who received points in at least two tournaments.

=== ATP ===
Rank	Nation	Player	Tours ^{1}	Titles	Points
1	GBR	Andy Murray^{2}	3	1	170
2	SUI	Roger Federer	2	1	170
3	USA	Mardy Fish	2	1	140
4	CYP	Marcos Baghdatis	4		120
5	ARG	David Nalbandian	3	1	110
6	SRB	Novak Djokovic	2		70
6	ESP	Rafael Nadal	2		70
6	USA	Andy Roddick	2		70
9	CZE	Tomáš Berdych	3		55
10	RSA	Kevin Anderson	2		40
10	RUS	Nikolay Davydenko	2		40
10	GER	Philipp Kohlschreiber	2		40
10	BEL	Xavier Malisse	2		40
10	SRB	Janko Tipsarević	2		40
15	SWE	Robin Söderling	2		30

==== Notes ====
- 1 – Tours – Number of tournaments in US Open Series in which a player has reached the quarterfinals or better, in 250 and 500 series events or the Round of 16 in ATP World Tour Masters 1000 events.
- 2 – Murray finished first by virtue of head-to-head results because he defeated Federer in Toronto.

=== WTA ===
Rank	Nation	Player	Tours ^{1}	Titles	Points
1	DEN	Caroline Wozniacki	3	2 (1st, 2nd)	185
2	BEL	Kim Clijsters	2	1	125
3	RUS	Svetlana Kuznetsova^{2}	2	1	115
4	BLR	Victoria Azarenka	2	1	115
4	RUS	Maria Sharapova	2		115
6	POL	Agnieszka Radwańska	3		100
7	RUS	Vera Zvonareva	2		85
8	FRA	Marion Bartoli	4		80
8	ITA	Flavia Pennetta	4		80
10	RUS	Elena Dementieva	3		55
10	AUS	Samantha Stosur	3		55
12	RUS	Maria Kirilenko	2		40
12	BEL	Yanina Wickmayer	2		40
14	CHN	Li Na	2		30
14	ISR	Shahar Pe'er	2		30
14	RUS	Dinara Safina	2		30

==== Notes ====
- 1 – Tours – Number of tournaments in US Open Series in which a player has reached the quarterfinals or better, in Premier events; or the Round of 16 or better in Premier 5 events.
- 2 – Kuznetsova finished third based on more total games won in US Open Series events than Azarenka and Sharapova. All three won 9 matches and 19 sets.

== 2010 schedule ==
Legend
Grand Slam Event
ATP Masters 1000 and WTA Premier 5
ATP World Tour 500 and WTA Premier
ATP World Tour 250

Week	Date	Men's Events	Women's Events
1	July 19–25	Atlanta; Atlanta Tennis Championships; 2010 Champion: (United States) Mardy Fish	No series event held this week
2	July 26 – Aug 1	Los Angeles; LA Tennis Open presented by Farmers Insurance; 2010 Champion: (United States) Sam Querrey	Stanford; Bank of the West Classic; 2010 Champion: (Belarus) Victoria Azarenka
3	Aug 2–8	Washington, D.C. Legg Mason Tennis Classic Presented by Geico; 2010 Champion: (Argentina) David Nalbandian	San Diego; Southern California Open; 2010 Champion: (Russia) Svetlana Kuznetsova
4	Aug 9–15	Toronto; Rogers Masters Presented by National Bank; 2010 Champion: (United Kingdom) Andy Murray	Cincinnati; Western & Southern Financial Group Women's Open; 2010 Champion: (Belgium) Kim Clijsters
5	Aug 16–22	Cincinnati; Western & Southern Financial Group Masters; 2010 Champion: (Switzerland) Roger Federer	Montreal; Rogers Cup; 2010 Champion: (Denmark) Caroline Wozniacki
6	Aug 23–29	New Haven; Pilot Pen Tennis Presented by Schick; 2010 Champion: (Ukraine) Sergiy Stakhovsky	New Haven; Pilot Pen Tennis Presented by Schick; 2010 Champion: (Denmark) Caroline Wozniacki
7–8	Aug 30 – Sep 13	New York; US Open; 2010 Champion: (Spain) Rafael Nadal	New York; US Open; 2010 Champion: (Belgium) Kim Clijsters

== Week 1 ==
=== ATP – Atlanta Tennis Championships ===
Americans Andy Roddick and John Isner headlined the event. In the second round, former world number one Lleyton Hewitt was upset by Lukáš Lacko, but the Slovak was unable to follow up the win and instead Kevin Anderson reached his first ATP Tour semifinal. Mardy Fish took out doubles partner Andy Roddick to set up an all-American final against second seeded Isner. Fish outlasted Isner to win the title.

==== Main Draw Finals ====
Quarterfinals
1/WC	(United States) Andy Roddick	4	6	6
7	(Belgium) Xavier Malisse	6	3	4
(United States) Taylor Dent	3	0
6	(United States) Mardy Fish	6	6
(South Africa) Kevin Anderson	6	6
(Slovakia) Lukáš Lacko	3	4
(United States) Michael Russell	1	2
2	(United States) John Isner	6	6

Semifinals
1/WC	(United States) Andy Roddick	6^{5}	3
6	(United States) Mardy Fish	7	6
(South Africa) Kevin Anderson	3	7	3
2	(United States) John Isner	6	6^{7}	6

Final
6	(United States) Mardy Fish	4	6	7
2	(United States) John Isner	6	4	6^{4}

== Week 2 ==
=== ATP – LA Tennis Open ===
World number four Andy Murray and American Sam Querrey headlined the event. Despite rocky starts in the tournament, Murray and Querrey held their seedings and faced off in the tournament's final. Querrey successfully defended his title by saving a match point and upsetting Murray in two hours and twenty-two minutes.

==== Main Draw Finals ====
Quarterfinals
1/WC	(United Kingdom) Andy Murray	7	6
(Colombia) Alejandro Falla	6^{3}	1
4	(Spain) Feliciano López	3	7	6
WC	(United States) James Blake	6	6^{6}	4
6	(Serbia) Janko Tipsarević	6	7
3	(Cyprus) Marcos Baghdatis	3	5
(Germany) Rainer Schüttler	2	6	6^{4}
2	(United States) Sam Querrey	6	3	7

Semifinals
1/WC	(United Kingdom) Andy Murray	6	1	6
4	(Spain) Feliciano López	0	6	4
6	(Serbia) Janko Tipsarević	7	6^{5}	4
2	(United States) Sam Querrey	6^{3}	7	6

Final
1/WC	(United Kingdom) Andy Murray	7	6^{2}	3
2	(United States) Sam Querrey	5	7	6

=== WTA – Bank of the West Classic ===
Samantha Stosur and former world number ones Maria Sharapova, Dinara Safina, and Ana Ivanovic headlined the event. Shahar Pe'er became the only seed not to advance to the quarterfinals, falling to Russian Maria Kirilenko in the second round. Victoria Azarenka defeated top seeded Stosur in the semifinals en route to winning the championship.

==== Main Draw Finals ====
Quarterfinals
1	(Australia) Samantha Stosur	7	3	6
7	(Belgium) Yanina Wickmayer	5	6	3
4	(France) Marion Bartoli	6	3	3
8/WC	(Belarus) Victoria Azarenka	3	6	6
(Russia) Maria Kirilenko	5	0
3	(Poland) Agnieszka Radwańska	7	6
5	(Russia) Maria Sharapova	6	2	6
2	(Russia) Elena Dementieva	4	6	3

Semifinals
1	(Australia) Samantha Stosur	2	3
8/WC	(Belarus) Victoria Azarenka	6	6
3	(Poland) Agnieszka Radwańska	6	2	2
5	(Russia) Maria Sharapova	1	6	6

Final
8/WC	(Belarus) Victoria Azarenka	6	6
5	(Russia) Maria Sharapova	4	1

== Week 3 ==
=== ATP – Legg Mason Tennis Classic ===
Wimbledon finalist Tomáš Berdych, Andy Roddick, Los Angeles champion Sam Querrey, and Atlanta champion Mardy Fish headlined the event. The second round welcomed a plethora of upsets with seven of the sixteen seeds falling, including the number six seed Querrey. The upsets continued as Berdych and third seeded Fernando Verdasco were knocked out in the quarters. Wildcard David Nalbandian took advantage of the open draw and won the final against Marcos Baghdatis.

==== Main Draw Finals ====
Quarterfinals
1	(Czech Republic) Tomáš Berdych	4	6	2
(Belgium) Xavier Malisse	6	3	6
3/WC	(Spain) Fernando Verdasco	6^{3}	4
8	(Cyprus) Marcos Baghdatis	7	6
(Serbia) Janko Tipsarević	6^{4}	4
4	(Croatia) Marin Čilić	7	6
WC	(Argentina) David Nalbandian	3	6	6
13	(France) Gilles Simon	6	2	3

Semifinals
(Belgium) Xavier Malisse	2	6^{4}
8	(Cyprus) Marcos Baghdatis	6	7
4	(Croatia) Marin Čilić	2	2
WC	(Argentina) David Nalbandian	6	6

Final
8	(Cyprus) Marcos Baghdatis	2	6^{4}
WC	(Argentina) David Nalbandian	6	7

=== WTA – Mercury Insurance Open ===
The Serbian pair of Jelena Janković and Ana Ivanovic along with world number five Samantha Stosur headlined the event. By defeating Melanie Oudin, Stosur reached her ninth quarterfinal of the year, breaking away from Li Na who also had eight quarterfinal appearances in 2010. Stosur's stride, however, was cut short by Flavia Pennetta who improved to a 3–0 record over the Australian. In a dramatic final, Svetlana Kuznetsova defeated Agnieszka Radwańska, meaning three players (Victoria Azarenka, Kuznetsova, and Radwańska) will head into Cincinnati with 70 points each on the Olympus US Open Series.

==== Main Draw Finals ====
Quarterfinals
(Russia) Alisa Kleybanova	6	4	3
(Slovakia) Daniela Hantuchová	2	6	6
4	(Poland) Agnieszka Radwańska	6	6
7	(Israel) Shahar Pe'er	2	0
(Russia) Svetlana Kuznetsova	7	6
Q	(United States) Coco Vandeweghe	5	2
5	(Italy) Flavia Pennetta	6	6
2	(Australia) Samantha Stosur	4	3

Semifinals
(Slovakia) Daniela Hantuchová	4	2
4	(Poland) Agnieszka Radwańska	6	6
(Russia) Svetlana Kuznetsova	6	6
5	(Italy) Flavia Pennetta	4	0

Final
4	(Poland) Agnieszka Radwańska	4	7	3
(Russia) Svetlana Kuznetsova	6	6^{7}	6

== Week 4 ==
=== ATP - Rogers Masters ===
Past champions Rafael Nadal, Roger Federer, Andy Murray, and Novak Djokovic, headlined the event. Of the final sixteen players left in the draw, only eight of them were seeded, with Gaël Monfils being the only player from the bottom half of the seeds to advance to the tournament's third round. Washington champion, David Nalbandian, increased his winning streak to eleven after upsetting world number five Robin Söderling in the third round. Federer won a dramatic night match against Tomáš Berdych to guarantee, for the first time at the Rogers Masters, a final four showdown against the top four ranked men in the world, joining Nadal, Djokovic, and Murray. Murray upset Nadal and Federer and successfully defended his title.

==== Main Draw Finals ====
Third Round
1	(Spain) Rafael Nadal	6	7
Q	(South Africa) Kevin Anderson	2	6^{6}
(Germany) Philipp Kohlschreiber	6^{5}	7	6
Q	(Chinese Taipei) Lu Yen-hsun	7	5	0
4	(United Kingdom) Andy Murray	6	0	6
15	(France) Gaël Monfils	2	6	3
PR	(Argentina) David Nalbandian	4	6	6
5	(Sweden) Robin Söderling	6	4	1
7	(Czech Republic) Tomáš Berdych	6	6^{5}	6
(Ukraine) Alexandr Dolgopolov	3	7	4
(France) Michaël Llodra	6^{2}	3
3	(Switzerland) Roger Federer	7	6
6	(Russia) Nikolay Davydenko	3	2
(France) Jérémy Chardy	6	6
(Romania) Victor Hănescu	3	4
2	(Serbia) Novak Djokovic	6	6

Quarterfinals
1	(Spain) Rafael Nadal	3	6	6
(Germany) Philipp Kohlschreiber	6	3	4
4	(United Kingdom) Andy Murray	6	6
PR	(Argentina) David Nalbandian	2	2
7	(Czech Republic) Tomáš Berdych	3	7	6^{5}
3	(Switzerland) Roger Federer	6	5	7
(France) Jérémy Chardy	2	3
2	(Serbia) Novak Djokovic	6	6

Semifinals
1	(Spain) Rafael Nadal	3	4
4	(United Kingdom) Andy Murray	6	6
3	(Switzerland) Roger Federer	6	3	7
2	(Serbia) Novak Djokovic	1	6	5

Final
4	(United Kingdom) Andy Murray	7	7
3	(Switzerland) Roger Federer	5	5

=== WTA - Western & Southern Financial Group Women's Open ===
Defending champion Jelena Janković, Caroline Wozniacki, Victoria Azarenka, Kim Clijsters, and Maria Sharapova headlined the event. Azarenka, the Stanford champion, suffered the first major upset of the tournament, losing in the first round to former world number one Ana Ivanovic, who entered the tournament ranked World No. 62 and having lost 17 of her last 29 matches dating back to August 2009, despite having served for the match at 5–4 in the second set. French Open champion Francesca Schiavone was the biggest second round casualty, going down to Elena Vesnina. The third round brought three more stunning results as top seeds Janković and Wozniacki, as well as Vera Zvonareva were all defeated in straight sets. The quarter-finals went to rank, with the exception of Anastasia Pavlyuchenkova, who joined Ivanovic, as a surprise semifinalist of the tournament. The two semi-finals saw Clijsters and Sharapova both advance in contrasting circumstances; Clijsters won through after Ana Ivanovic was forced to retire in the first set due to a foot injury, whilst Sharapova needed three sets to defeat Pavlyuchenkova. Despite having championship points, Sharapova lost to Clijsters in a blockbuster final.

==== Main Draw Finals ====
Third Round
1	(Serbia) Jelena Janković	6^{3}	4
Q	(Uzbekistan) Akgul Amanmuradova	7	6
(Serbia) Ana Ivanovic	6	6
(Russia) Elena Vesnina	0	3
4	(Belgium) Kim Clijsters	6	6
WC	(United States) Christina McHale	1	1
11	(Italy) Flavia Pennetta	6	6
6	(Russia) Vera Zvonareva	4	3
8	(China) Li Na	6	2	6^{4}
12	(Belgium) Yanina Wickmayer	2	6	7
13	(Israel) Shahar Pe'er	7	4	4
(Russia) Anastasia Pavlyuchenkova	5	6	6
7	(Poland) Agnieszka Radwańska	2	3
10	(Russia) Maria Sharapova	6	6
16	(France) Marion Bartoli	6	6
2	(Denmark) Caroline Wozniacki	4	1

Quarterfinals
Q	(Uzbekistan) Akgul Amanmuradova	1	3
(Serbia) Ana Ivanovic	6	6
4	(Belgium) Kim Clijsters	7	6
11	(Italy) Flavia Pennetta	6^{6}	4
12	(Belgium) Yanina Wickmayer	5	6	1
(Russia) Anastasia Pavlyuchenkova	7	3	6
10	(Russia) Maria Sharapova	6	6
16	(France) Marion Bartoli	1	4

Semifinals
(Serbia) Ana Ivanovic	1	r
4	(Belgium) Kim Clijsters	2
(Russia) Anastasia Pavlyuchenkova	4	6	2
10	(Russia) Maria Sharapova	6	3	6

Final
4	(Belgium) Kim Clijsters	2	7	6
10	(Russia) Maria Sharapova	6	6^{4}	2

== Week 5 ==
=== ATP - Western & Southern Financial Group Masters ===
World number one Rafael Nadal joined past champions Roger Federer and Andy Murray along with Novak Djokovic and Andy Roddick to headline the event. Marcos Baghdatis had a dream run to the semifinals defeating Wimbledon finalist Tomáš Berdych and Wimbledon champion Nadal in back-to-back matches. An inspired Mardy Fish also added to his summer success by defeating defending champion, Murray, and Roddick in the quarterfinals and semifinals, respectively. In the final, Federer took out Fish in a match that had only one break of serve.

==== Main Draw Finals ====
Third Round
1	(Spain) Rafael Nadal	5	7	6
(France) Julien Benneteau	7	6^{6}	2
(Cyprus) Marcos Baghdatis	7	6
7	(Czech Republic) Tomáš Berdych	5	4
3	(Switzerland) Roger Federer	w/o
(Germany) Philipp Kohlschreiber
10	(Spain) David Ferrer	6	3	5
6	(Russia) Nikolay Davydenko	4	6	7
WC	(United States) Mardy Fish	7	6
(France) Richard Gasquet	5	2
(Latvia) Ernests Gulbis	6	3	6^{4}
4	(United Kingdom) Andy Murray	4	6	7
5	(Sweden) Robin Söderling	4	7	6^{5}
9	(United States) Andy Roddick	6	6^{7}	7
(Argentina) David Nalbandian	1	6^{7}
2	(Serbia) Novak Djokovic	6	7

Quarterfinals
1	(Spain) Rafael Nadal	4	6	4
(Cyprus) Marcos Baghdatis	6	4	6
3	(Switzerland) Roger Federer	6	7
6	(Russia) Nikolay Davydenko	4	5
WC	(United States) Mardy Fish	6^{7}	6	7
4	(United Kingdom) Andy Murray	7	1	6^{5}
9	(United States) Andy Roddick	6	7
2	(Serbia) Novak Djokovic	4	5

Semifinals
(Cyprus) Marcos Baghdatis	4	3
3	(Switzerland) Roger Federer	6	6
WC	(United States) Mardy Fish	4	7	6
9	(United States) Andy Roddick	6	6^{3}	1

Final
3	(Switzerland) Roger Federer	6^{5}	7	6
WC	(United States) Mardy Fish	7	6^{1}	4

=== WTA - Rogers Cup ===
Jelena Janković, Caroline Wozniacki, US Open Series tournament winners Victoria Azarenka, Svetlana Kuznetsova, and Kim Clijsters joined defending champion Elena Dementieva to headline the event. The tournament saw the withdrawal of big-name Grand Slam champions Venus Williams and Maria Sharapova and also lost its top seed, Janković, in the second round. Azarenka and Kuznetsova rebounded from their first round losses in Cincinnati to reach another semifinal in the US Open Series, while Cincinnati champion, Clijsters, lost her second consecutive match against Vera Zvonareva in the quarterfinals. In the end, Wozniacki would only drop 5 games in each of her last three matches to win the tournament.

==== Main Draw Finals ====
Third Round
Q	(Czech Republic) Iveta Benešová	0	1
17	(France) Marion Bartoli	6	6
10	(Belarus) Victoria Azarenka	6	6
9	(China) Li Na	3	3
5	(Belgium) Kim Clijsters	6	6
(Estonia) Kaia Kanepi	2	1
(Hungary) Ágnes Szávay	3	3
8	(Russia) Vera Zvonareva	6	6
7	(Poland) Agnieszka Radwańska	4	6	3
11	(Russia) Svetlana Kuznetsova	6	1	6
(China) Zheng Jie	7	6
4	(Russia) Elena Dementieva	6^{3}	4
6	(Italy) Francesca Schiavone	6	6
(Russia) Dinara Safina	4	3
15	(Italy) Flavia Pennetta	6	3	1
2	(Denmark) Caroline Wozniacki	4	6	6

Quarterfinals
17	(France) Marion Bartoli	2	6^{6}
10	(Belarus) Victoria Azarenka	6	7
5	(Belgium) Kim Clijsters	6	3	2
8	(Russia) Vera Zvonareva	2	6	6
11	(Russia) Svetlana Kuznetsova	6	6
(China) Zheng Jie	1	3
6	(Italy) Francesca Schiavone	3	2
2	(Denmark) Caroline Wozniacki	6	6

Semifinals
10	(Belarus) Victoria Azarenka	6^{6}	1	r
8	(Russia) Vera Zvonareva	7	1
11	(Russia) Svetlana Kuznetsova	2	3
2	(Denmark) Caroline Wozniacki	6	6

Final
8	(Russia) Vera Zvonareva	3	2
2	(Denmark) Caroline Wozniacki	6	6

== Week 6 ==
=== ATP – Pilot Pen Tennis ===
Marcos Baghdatis, Thomaz Bellucci and Fernando González headlined the event. Of the top eight seeds, only top-seeded Baghdatis was able to reach the quarterfinals, where he was then upset by ninth seed Sergiy Stakhovsky. After battling past Viktor Troicki in the semifinals, Denis Istomin fell to Stakhovsky in three sets in the final.

==== Main Draw Finals ====
Quarterfinals
1	(Cyprus) Marcos Baghdatis	7	1	6^{4}
9	(Ukraine) Sergiy Stakhovsky	5	6	7
(Kazakhstan) Evgeny Korolev	4	3
12	(Netherlands) Thiemo de Bakker	6	6
10	(Serbia) Viktor Troicki	6	6
LL	(Czech Republic) Radek Štěpánek	2	3
Q	(Russia) Teymuraz Gabashvili	1	6	6^{8}
15	(Uzbekistan) Denis Istomin	6	3	7

Semifinals
9	(Ukraine) Sergiy Stakhovsky	6	6
12	(Netherlands) Thiemo de Bakker	3	4
10	(Serbia) Viktor Troicki	6^{10}	6	2
15	(Uzbekistan) Denis Istomin	7	3	6

Final
9	(Ukraine) Sergiy Stakhovsky	3	6	6
15	(Uzbekistan) Denis Istomin	6	3	4

=== WTA – Pilot Pen Tennis ===
Two-time defending champion and recent Montreal champion Caroline Wozniacki joined Roland Garros finalist Samantha Stosur and Roland Garros champion Francesca Schiavone to headline the event. All four of the tournament's wildcards reached the quarterfinals, where two of them, Elena Dementieva and Nadia Petrova (who took Ana Ivanovic's original wildcard slot after the Serb withdrew due to the foot injury she suffered at Cincinnati), advanced to the semifinals. Only five days after winning in Montreal, Wozniacki won her third consecutive title in New Haven. The win also secured her first place in the 2010 US Open Series.

==== Main Draw Finals ====
Quarterfinals
1	(Denmark) Caroline Wozniacki	w/o
7	(Italy) Flavia Pennetta
4/WC	(Russia) Elena Dementieva	6	3	6
6	(France) Marion Bartoli	3	6	2
(Russia) Maria Kirilenko	6	6
WC	(Russia) Dinara Safina	3	3
8/WC	(Russia) Nadia Petrova	6	6
2/WC	(Australia) Samantha Stosur	2	1

Semifinals
1	(Denmark) Caroline Wozniacki	1	6	7
4/WC	(Russia) Elena Dementieva	6	3	6^{5}
(Russia) Maria Kirilenko	6	2	2
8/WC	(Russia) Nadia Petrova	2	6	6

Final
1	(Denmark) Caroline Wozniacki	6	3	6
8/WC	(Russia) Nadia Petrova	3	6	3
