= 2010 Rogers Cup =

- Date: August 7–15 (men); August 13–23 (women)
- Edition: 121st (men) / 109th (women)
- Surface: Hard / outdoor

Champions

Men's singles
- (United Kingdom) Andy Murray

Women's singles
- (Denmark) Caroline Wozniacki

Men's doubles
- (United States) Bob Bryan / (United States) Mike Bryan

Women's doubles
- (Argentina) Gisela Dulko / (Italy) Flavia Pennetta
- Canadian Open

The 2010 Canada Masters (also known as the 2010 Rogers Cup presented by National Bank and the 2010 Rogers Cup for sponsorship reasons) was a tennis tournament played on outdoor hard courts in Canada. It was the 121st edition of the Canada Masters for the men (the 109th edition for the women), and was part of the ATP Masters Series of the 2010 ATP World Tour, and of the Premier Series of the 2010 WTA Tour. The men's event was held at the Rexall Centre in Toronto, Canada, from August 7 through August 15, 2010. The women's event was held at the Uniprix Stadium in Montreal, Canada, from August 13 through August 23, 2010. It was scheduled to end August 22 but some of the matches were postponed to August 23 due to rain.

== Finals ==
=== Men's singles ===
(United Kingdom) Andy Murray defeated (Switzerland) Roger Federer, 7–5, 7–5

- It was Murray's first title of the year and 15th of his career. It was his second consecutive win at the event, the first repeat Canadian Masters winner since Andre Agassi in 1994–1995.
- Federer rose to world no. 2 upon reaching the final.

=== Women's singles ===
(Denmark) Caroline Wozniacki defeated (Russia) Vera Zvonareva, 6–3, 6–2

- It was Wozniacki's 3rd title of the year and 9th of her career. It was her first Premier 5 title.

=== Men's doubles ===
(United States) Bob Bryan / (United States) Mike Bryan defeated (France) Julien Benneteau / (France) Michaël Llodra, 7–5, 6–3

- This win was the Bryan's sixteenth Masters Series win, for their careers.
- Also, this was the third time they won the Canadian Masters in their careers.

=== Women's doubles ===
(Argentina) Gisela Dulko / (Italy) Flavia Pennetta defeated (Czech Republic) Květa Peschke / (Slovenia) Katarina Srebotnik, 7–5, 3–6, [12–10]

== ATP entrants ==
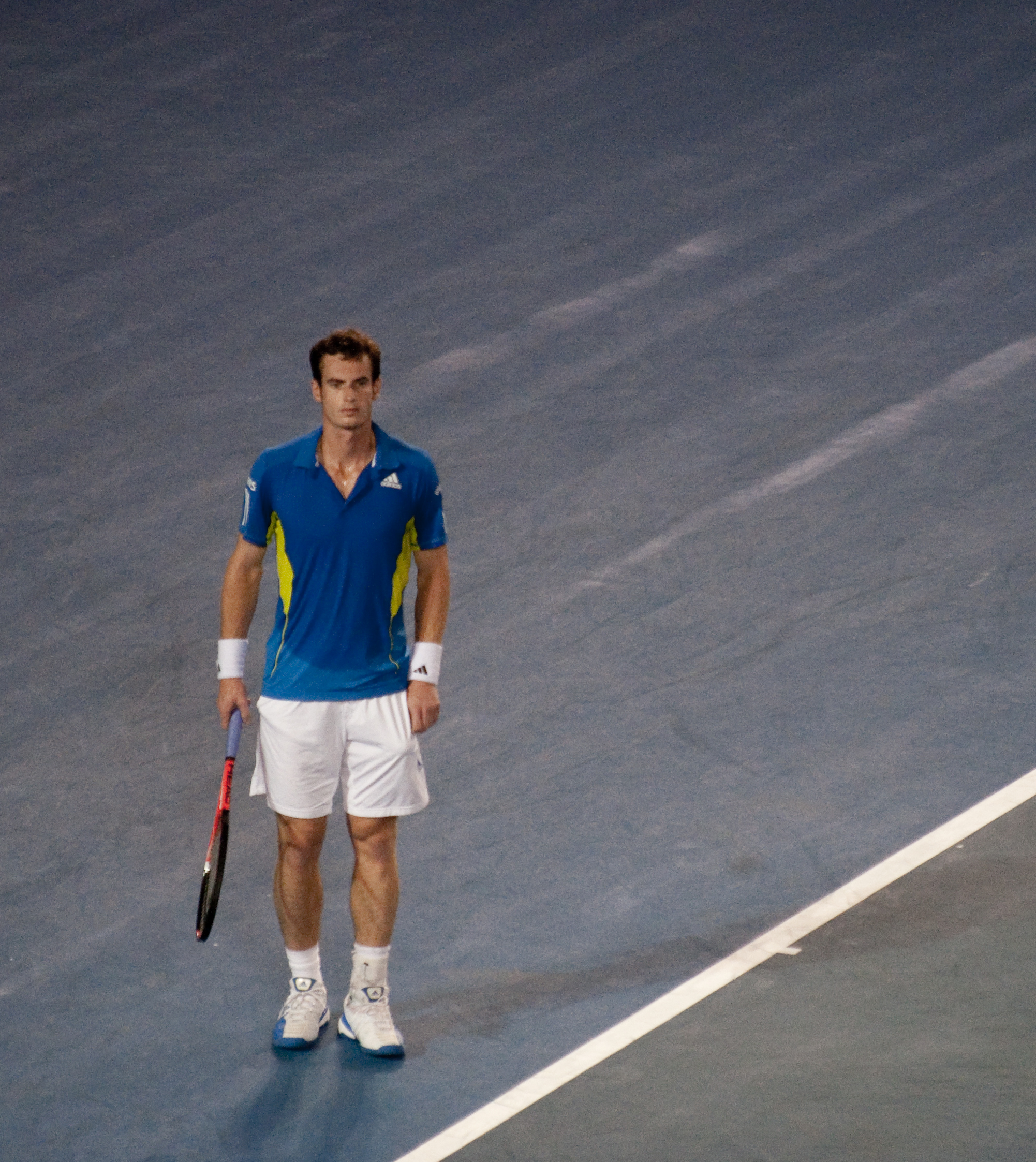
Andy Murray successfully defended the men's singles title

=== Seeds ===
Country	Player	Rank^{[a]}	Seed^{[b]}
ESP	Rafael Nadal	1	1
SRB	Novak Djokovic	2	2
SUI	Roger Federer	3	3
GBR	Andy Murray	4	4
SWE	Robin Söderling	5	5
RUS	Nikolay Davydenko	6	6
CZE	Tomáš Berdych	8	7
~~USA~~	~~Andy Roddick~~	~~9~~	~~8~~
ESP	Fernando Verdasco	10	9
ESP	David Ferrer	12	10
CRO	Marin Čilić	13	11
RUS	Mikhail Youzhny	14	12
AUT	Jürgen Melzer	15	13
ESP	Nicolás Almagro	16	14
FRA	Gaël Monfils	18	15
USA	Sam Querrey	20	16

- Seedings are based on the rankings of August 2, 2010 and is subject to change.

=== Other entrants ===
The following players received wildcards into the singles main draw:

- (Canada) Frank Dancevic
- (Canada) Pierre-Ludovic Duclos
- (Canada) Peter Polansky
- (Canada) Milos Raonic

The following player received special exempt into the singles main draw:

- (Belgium) Xavier Malisse

The following players received entry from the qualifying draw:

- (South Africa) Kevin Anderson
- (Uzbekistan) Denis Istomin
- (Chinese Taipei) Lu Yen-hsun
- (Italy) Fabio Fognini
- (Ukraine) Illya Marchenko
- (Finland) Jarkko Nieminen
- (United States) Michael Russell

The following players received the lucky loser spots:

- (India) Somdev Devvarman
- (France) Paul-Henri Mathieu

=== Notable withdrawals ===
- (Argentina) Juan Martín del Potro (wrist injury)
- (Spain) Juan Carlos Ferrero (knee Injury)
- (Chile) Fernando González (calf)
- (Australia) Lleyton Hewitt (calf strain)
- (United States) John Isner (shoulder injury)
- (Croatia) Ivan Ljubičić
- (Argentina) Juan Mónaco (wrist injury)
- (Spain) Albert Montañés
- (United States) Andy Roddick (glandular fever)
- (France) Jo-Wilfried Tsonga (knee Injury)

== WTA entrants ==
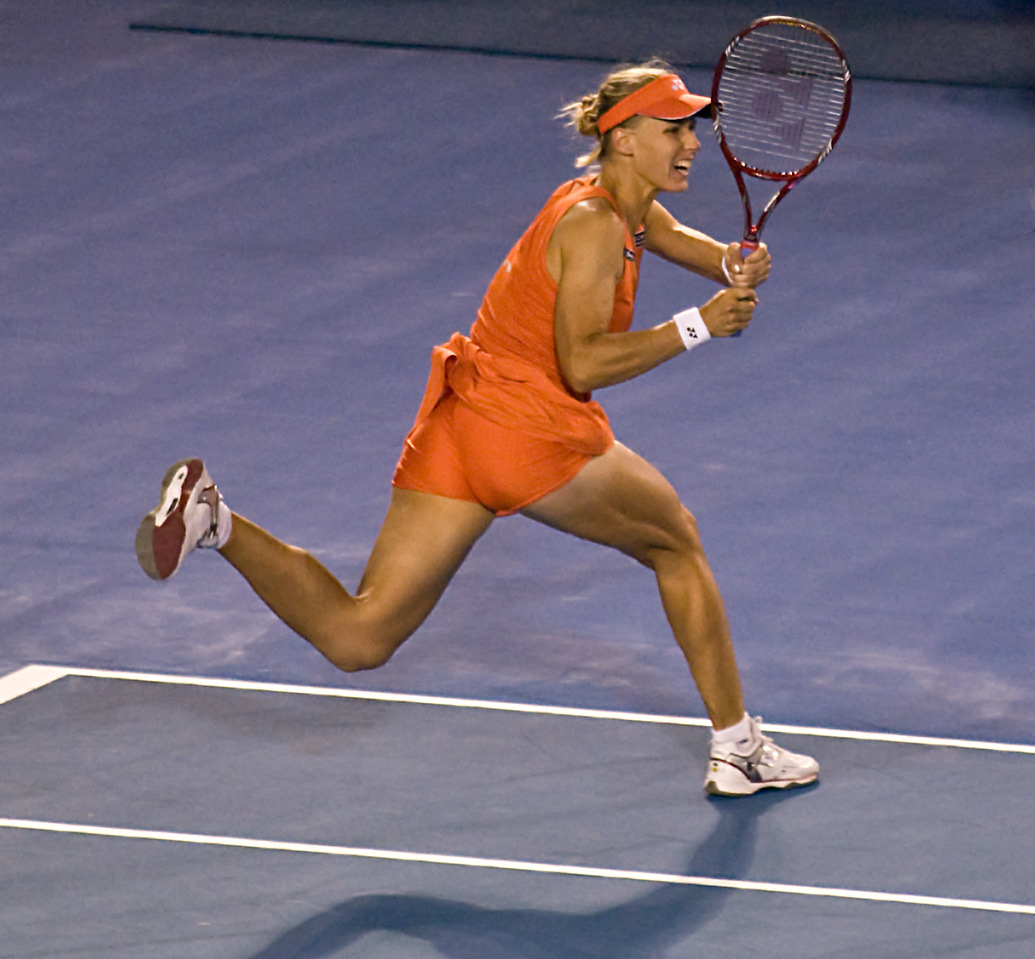
Elena Dementieva is the women's defending champion

=== Seeds ===
Player	Nationality	Ranking*	Seed
Jelena Janković	Serbia	2	1
Caroline Wozniacki	Denmark	3	2
~~Venus Williams~~	~~United States~~	~~4~~	~~3~~
Elena Dementieva	Russia	6	4
Kim Clijsters	Belgium	7	5
Francesca Schiavone	Italy	8	6
Agnieszka Radwańska	Poland	9	7
Vera Zvonareva	Russia	10	8
Li Na	(China)	11	9
Victoria Azarenka	Belarus	12	10
Svetlana Kuznetsova	Russia	14	11
~~Maria Sharapova~~	~~Russia~~	~~15~~	~~12~~
Yanina Wickmayer	Belgium	16	13
Shahar Pe'er	Israel	17	14
Flavia Pennetta	Italy	18	15
Aravane Rezaï	France	19	16
Marion Bartoli	France	20	17
Nadia Petrova	Russia	21	18

- These seedings are ranking of August 9, 2010

=== Other entrants ===
The following players received wildcards into the singles main draw

- (Canada) Stéphanie Dubois
- (France) Virginie Razzano
- (Canada) Valérie Tétreault
- (Canada) Aleksandra Wozniak

The following players received entry from the qualifying draw:

- (Czech Republic) Iveta Benešová
- (Canada) Heidi El Tabakh
- (Australia) Jarmila Groth
- (Czech Republic) Lucie Hradecká
- (United States) Vania King
- (Russia) Ekaterina Makarova
- (United States) Bethanie Mattek-Sands
- (Romania) Monica Niculescu

The following players received the lucky loser spots:

- (Japan) Kimiko Date-Krumm
- (Switzerland) Patty Schnyder

=== Notable withdrawals ===
- (Belgium) Justine Henin (elbow injury)
- (Russia) Maria Sharapova (left foot injury)
- (Australia) Samantha Stosur (shoulder injury)
- (United States) Serena Williams (foot surgery)
- (United States) Venus Williams (left knee injury)

Preceded by Washington, D.C.	2010 US Open Series; Men's Events	Succeeded by Cincinnati
Preceded by Cincinnati	2010 US Open Series; Women's Events	Succeeded by New Haven
