= 2010 Bank of the West Classic =

Women's tennis tournament

- Date: July 26 – August 1
- Edition: 39th
- Category: WTA Premier tournaments
- Draw: 30S / 16D
- Prize money: $700,000
- Surface: Hard / outdoor
- Location: Stanford, California, United States
- Venue: Taube Tennis Center

Champions

Singles
- (Belarus) Victoria Azarenka

Doubles
- (United States) Lindsay Davenport / (United States) Liezel Huber
- Stanford Classic

The 2010 Bank of the West Classic was a women's tennis tournament played on outdoor hard courts. It was the 39th edition of the Bank of the West Classic, and is a part of the WTA Premier tournaments of the 2010 WTA Tour. It took place at the Taube Tennis Center in Stanford, California, United States, from July 26 through August 1, 2010. It was the first women's event on the 2010 US Open Series. Eighth-seeded Victoria Azarenka won the singles title.

== Finals ==
=== Singles ===
(Belarus) Victoria Azarenka defeated (Russia) Maria Sharapova, 6–4, 6–1.

- It was Azarenka's first title of the year and 4th of her career.

=== Doubles ===
(United States) Lindsay Davenport / (United States) Liezel Huber defeated (Chinese Taipei) Chan Yung-jan / (China) Zheng Jie, 7–5, 6–7^{(8–10)}, 10–8.

== Entrants ==
=== Seeds ===
Player	Nationality	Ranking*	Seed
Samantha Stosur	Australia	5	1
Elena Dementieva	Russia	6	2
Agnieszka Radwańska	Poland	11	3
Marion Bartoli	France	14	4
Maria Sharapova	Russia	15	5
Shahar Pe'er	Israel	16	6
Yanina Wickmayer	Belgium	17	7
Victoria Azarenka	Belarus	18	8

- Seedings are based on the rankings of July 19, 2010.
- Vera Zvonareva has withdrawn from the tournament.

=== Other entrants ===
The following players received wildcards into the singles main draw

- (Belarus) Victoria Azarenka
- (United States) Hilary Barte
- (Serbia) Ana Ivanovic
- (Russia) Dinara Safina

The following players received entry from the qualifying draw:

- (Chinese Taipei) Chang Kai-chen
- (Croatia) Mirjana Lučić
- (United States) Christina McHale
- (Ukraine) Olga Savchuk

The following player received entry from a protected ranking:

- (United States) Ashley Harkleroad

Preceded by None	2010 US Open Series Women's Events	Succeeded by San Diego
