= Shahar Pe'er =

Israeli tennis player (born 1987)

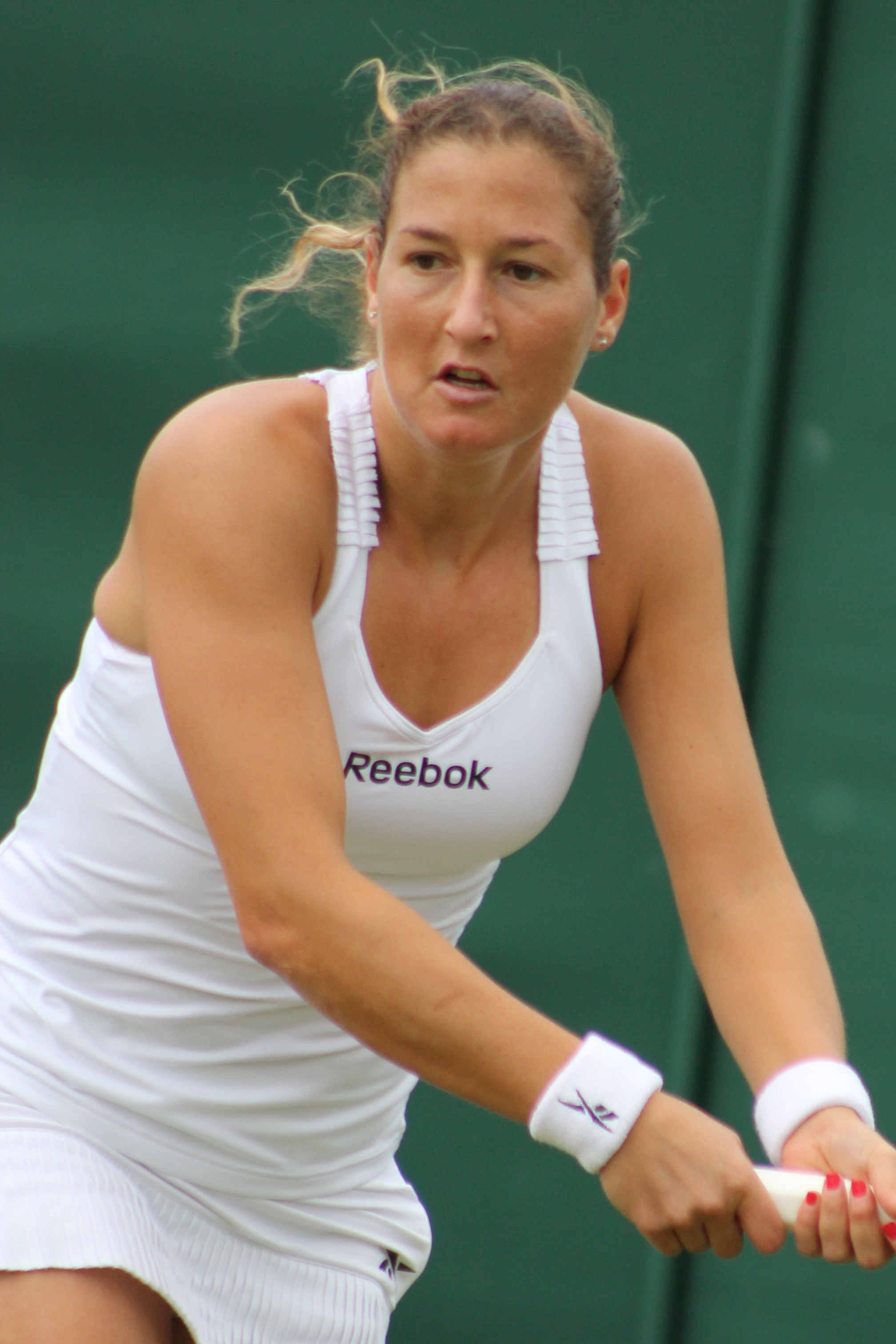
- Pe'er at the 2015 Wimbledon Qualifying
- Native name: שחר פאר
- Country (sports): Israel
- Residence: Macabim, Israel
- Born: 1 May 1987 (age 39) Jerusalem, Israel
- Height: 1.70 m (5 ft 7 in)
- Turned pro: 2004
- Retired: 28 February 2017
- Plays: Right-handed (two-handed backhand)
- Prize money: $5,148,411

Singles
- Career record: 412–276
- Career titles: 5
- Highest ranking: No. 11 (31 January 2011)

Grand Slam singles results
- Australian Open: QF (2007)
- French Open: 4R (2006, 2007, 2010)
- Wimbledon: 4R (2008)
- US Open: QF (2007)

Other tournaments
- Tour Finals: Alt (2010)
- Olympic Games: 2R (2008)

Doubles
- Career record: 189–175
- Career titles: 3
- Highest ranking: No. 14 (12 May 2008)

Grand Slam doubles results
- Australian Open: F (2008)
- French Open: QF (2008)
- Wimbledon: QF (2005, 2008)
- US Open: 3R (2007, 2010)

Other doubles tournaments
- Olympic Games: 1R (2008)

Shahar Pe'er (Hebrew: שחר פאר, pronounced [ˈʃaχaʁ peˈʔeʁ]; born 1 May 1987) is an Israeli retired tennis player.

Pe'er won five singles and three doubles titles on the WTA Tour, as well as four singles and three doubles titles on the ITF circuit in her career. She reached her best singles ranking of world number 11, the highest of any Israeli tennis player in history, in January 2011. She peaked at number 14 in the doubles rankings in May 2008.

Pe'er is widely regarded as the most successful Israeli female tennis player in history, having twice reached a Grand Slam quarterfinal in singles and appeared in the doubles final of the 2008 Australian Open, with Victoria Azarenka of Belarus. She won her first senior national title at the age of 14, and won the Junior Girls’ Australian Open title when she was 16.

Playing for Israel at the Fed Cup, Pe'er has a win–loss record of 39–28. She also represented Israel in two Olympics.

== Early life ==
Pe'er was born in Jerusalem, Israel, and is Jewish. Her father is Dov "Dovik" Pe'er who was born in South Africa in 1955 and immigrated to Israel in 1961, and her mother is Aliza. Her paternal grandfather Solly had volunteered as a medic in Israel after the 1948 Arab–Israeli War. She began playing tennis at the age of six when she joined her brother Shlomi and her sister Shani in tennis lessons. When Shahar was one, she and her family moved to Maccabim, Israel.

At the age of 19, Pe'er was enlisted as a soldier to the Israel Defense Forces. When not abroad participating in tennis tournaments, she spent her mornings working as an administrative secretary for the IDF, and her afternoons practicing tennis.

== Career ==
=== Early years ===
Pe'er began playing tennis competitively when she was six. Her first tournament win was in the doubles event with partner Nicole Vaidišová at the Eddie Herr International tournament when she was 12. She also reached the singles final at that tournament.

In 2001, Pe'er won the Nike Junior Tour International Masters tennis tournament and the Israeli women's tennis championship (the youngest Israeli to do so). She also won her age category at the Junior Orange Bowl.

In 2002, Pe'er won in singles at the Bat Yam International and in doubles at the Haifa International. She won the Amata Cup in Thailand in March 2003.

Pe'er's first major victory came at the 2004 Australian Open, where she won the Juniors' Championship. She beat her former partner Vaidišová in the final, and became the first Israeli woman to win a junior Grand Slam title since Anna Smashnova won the French Open girls' singles title in 1990.

==== Junior Grand Slam Records ====
- Australian Open – Win (2004)
- French Open – Quarter Final (2003, 2004)
- Wimbledon – Quarter Final (2004)
- US Open – Semi Final (2004)

=== 2004–2005 ===
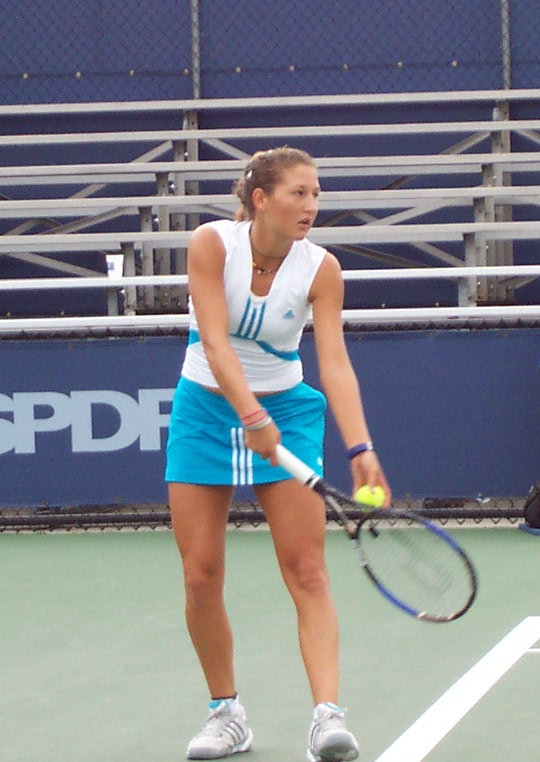
Pe'er at the 2004 US Open

Pe'er turned professional in 2004, a year during which she played both the ITF Circuit and the WTA Tour.

In 2005, Pe'er first played the main draw of a Grand Slam event, reaching the third round in both the French Open and the US Open. Pe'er finished 2005 ranked No. 45 in the world.

=== 2006–2007 ===
In January 2006 in Canberra, Australia, she lost a marathon semifinal match (the first of her career) against Spain's Anabel Medina Garrigues that lasted 3 hours and 45 minutes. At the time it was one of the ten longest matches in WTA Tour history.

In May 2006 she beat world no. 15 Anna-Lena Grönefeld of Germany in the semifinals and then upset world No. 2 Anastasia Myskina of Russia, to win in the finals of a level III event in Turkey.

At the 2006 French Open, Pe'er defeated world No. 8 Elena Dementieva of Russia in the round of 32, but lost to Martina Hingis, in their fourth-round match.

Pe'er reached the fourth round of the 2006 US Open, defeating world No. 15 Francesca Schiavone, but later fell to Justine Henin Hardenne.

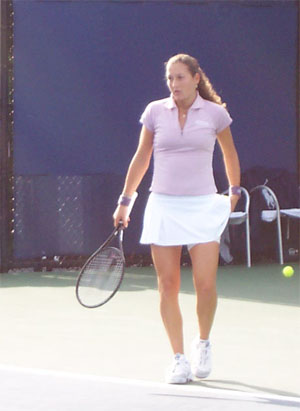
Pe'er at the 2006 US Open

Pe'er finished 2006 ranked 20th in the world, after winning her first three WTA singles titles that year in Pattaya, Prague, and Istanbul.

At the 2007 Australian Open, Pe'er made history by becoming the first Israeli woman to reach the quarterfinals of a Grand Slam event. In the fourth round she defeated world No. 4 Svetlana Kuznetsova, but was defeated in her quarterfinal match against eventual champion Serena Williams.

In March 2007 at Indian Wells, she defeated world no. 11 Anna Chakvetadze of Russia before losing in the quarterfinals to eventual winner Daniela Hantuchová. The following month at the Miami Masters, Pe'er made it to her first Tier 1 tournament semifinals before losing to eventual champion Serena Williams.

At the 2007 Rome Masters, Pe'er was defeated in the third round, again by Serena Williams. It was her fourth career loss to Williams, and the third in 2007. After beating Kuznetsova twice earlier in 2007, she met Kuznetsova for the third time in the fourth round of the French Open and lost.

Pe'er's impressive year soured with a disappointing appearance in Wimbledon in early July, where she lost in the third round to eventual runner-up Marion Bartoli. This was followed by three tournaments in California (the Bank of the West Classic, the Acura Classic, and the JPMorgan Chase Open) in which Pe'er was seeded, but was ousted by an unseeded player in either the first or second round. In late August, at the Rogers Cup in Toronto, Pe'er managed to pass the first two rounds, only to be ousted again by unseeded Virginie Razzano.

Pe'er went into the 2007 US Open seeded 18th and suffering from a chest injury. She beat Americans Meilen Tu and Bethanie Mattek, world No. 15 Czech Nicole Vaidišová, and Agnieszka Radwańska from Poland to reach her first US Open and second Grand Slam quarterfinals. In the quarterfinals she lost in straight sets to world No. 6, Anna Chakvetadze.

Following her successful appearance at the US Open, Pe'er lost in the second round at Luxembourg and at Stuttgart and fell in the quarterfinals of a Tier III event in Bangkok. Her return to center stage at the Zurich Open was again cut short with a first round loss. Finishing as a doubles runner-up in Luxembourg (partnering Victoria Azarenka) helped Pe'er achieve a career-high doubles ranking of 25 on 1 October.

Pe'er finished 2007 ranked 17th in the world.

=== 2008 ===
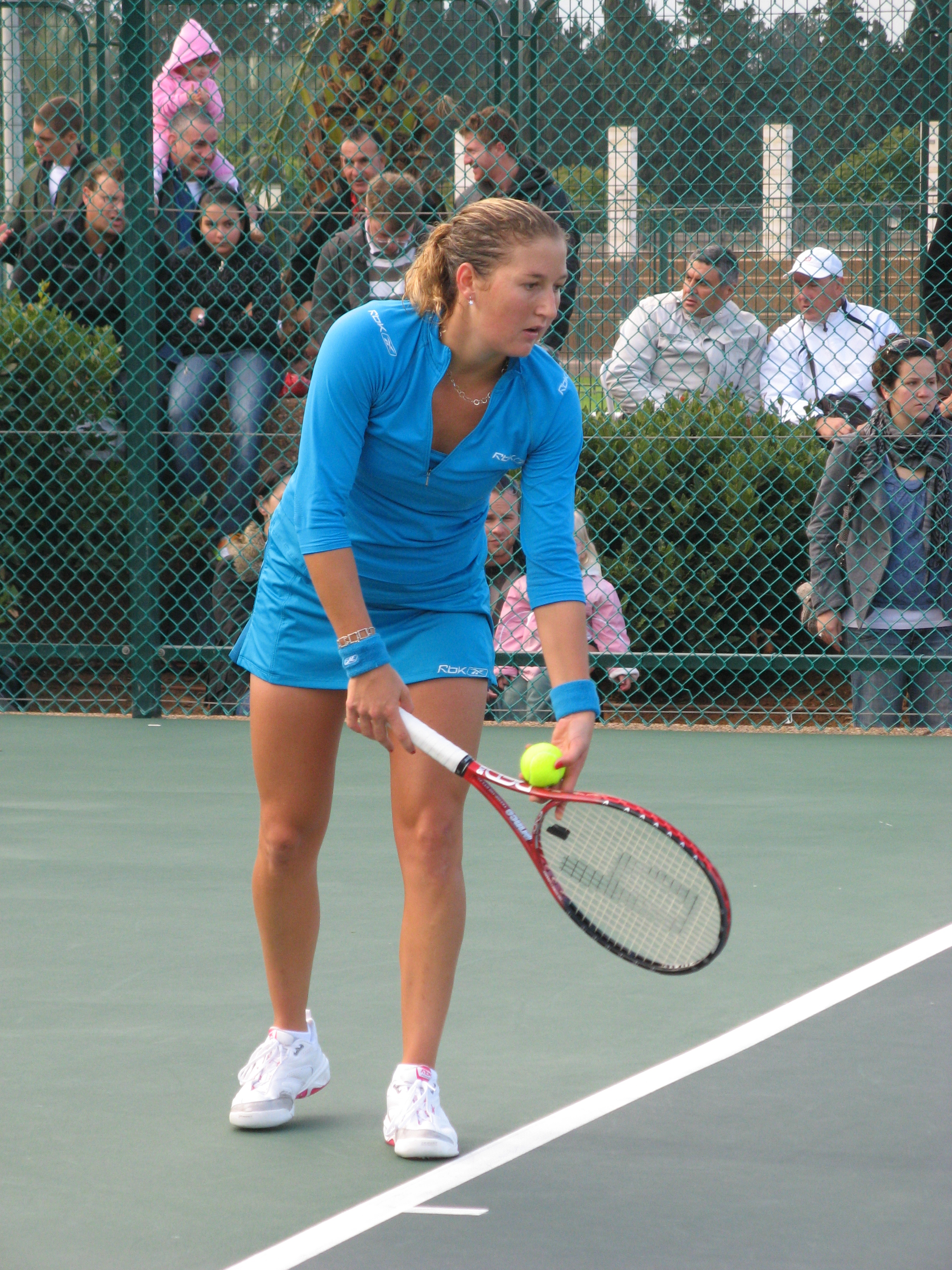
Pe'er at the 2008 Israel Tennis Championship

At the Australian Open, Pe'er was seeded No. 17, and lost in the third round to No. 11 seed Elena Dementieva. In the doubles tournament, Pe'er and her partner Azarenka were seeded No. 12. They got to final, where they lost to Alona and Kateryna Bondarenko. Following her first doubles Grand Slam final appearance Pe'er achieve a career-high doubles ranking of 16.

Late February, Pe'er became the first Israeli to compete in a WTA Tour event in the Arabian Peninsula when she reached the third round of the Qatar Total Open in Doha.

Pe'er lost at the second round in Indian Wells, the third in Miami and the first in Berlin. At the French Open, Pe'er was seeded No. 17 but lost in the first round to wild card recipient, Australian Samantha Stosur, a former top 30 player that was making a comeback from an injury. Together with partner Azarenka she reached the semifinals in both Miami and Berlin. In early May, Pe'er achieved a career-high doubles ranking of 14.

In Wimbledon, Pe'er advanced to the fourth round, before losing to No. 5 seed Elena Dementieva. Earlier, in the third round, Pe'er defeated the 9th seed Dinara Safina after a three-hours and 25 minutes match, the third-longest ladies' singles match in Wimbledon history. At the doubles tournament, Pe'er equaled her best result from 2005, after she and Victoria Azarenka reached the quarterfinals. At the quarterfinals, Pe'er and Azarenka, the sixth seed, lost to the top-seeded team of Cara Black and Liezel Huber.

Pe'er then represented Israel at the 2008 Summer Olympics in Beijing, where she lost in the second round to No. 9 seed Vera Zvonareva of Russia.

Pe'er fell ten places in the World Rankings from the start of the hardcourt season. She was dispatched in the first round of the US Open by China's Li Na.

She finished the year 2008 ranked World No. 38 with a singles record of 26–24 and a doubles record of 19–17.

=== 2009 ===
Pe'er started the year by playing in the ASB Classic in Auckland. Entering as the No. 5 seed, she defeated Petra Cetkovská in the first round and Barbora Záhlavová-Strýcová in the second round before losing to top seed and eventual champion Elena Dementieva in the quarterfinals. At the Australian Open, she lost in the first round to No. 11 seed Caroline Wozniacki.

After this event, Pe'er played in Israel's first tie of the 2009 Fed Cup. She won both her singles rubbers, against Kateryna Bondarenko and Alona Bondarenko. In the deciding doubles match (Ukraine won the other two singles rubbers), Pe'er teamed up with Tzipora Obziler, but they lost to the Bondarenkos.

At the Pattaya Women's Open, Pe'er was seeded seventh. She made it to the semifinals, before losing to top seeded Vera Zvonareva.

Pe'er lost in the first round of her next tournament, the Monterrey Open, to Iveta Benešová, the tournament's sixth-seed. She redeemed herself at the BNP Paribas Open, a WTA Premier event. She started the fortnight off defeating Kateryna Bondarenko, then upset 10th seeded Marion Bartoli 19th seeded Anna Chakvetadze before losing to the 8th seed and former doubles partner Victoria Azarenka. In doubles, paired with Gisela Dulko, she lost again lost to Azarenka and her partner Vera Zvonareva in the finals.

Pe'er's next tournament was the Sony Ericsson Open, the WTA Tour's second Premier Mandatory event of the year. She advanced to the second round before losing to fifth–seeded Venus Williams.

Pe'er reached the Estoril Open semifinals, but retired during her match against Yanina Wickmayer due to a leg injury. A week later she played in the Madrid Open, but had to retire again in her first round match, this time against Caroline Wozniacki. Pe'er's injury resulted in her missing the French Open.

In the first round at Wimbledon, Pe'er advanced to the second round before losing to No. 10 seed Nadia Petrova. At the GDF Suez Grand Prix she reached the quarterfinals losing to Alona Bondarenko. She then reached the second rounds of Bad Gastein and Los Angeles. In Toronto, Pe'er advanced to the third round before losing to eventual champion Elena Dementieva.

Pe'er reached the third round of the US Open before losing to the No. 6 seed, Svetlana Kuznetsova.

In September, Pe'er ended a three-year drought without a tournament win at the Guangzhou International Women's Open in China without dropping a set. In the final, Pe'er beat Italy's Alberta Brianti. She went on to win the Tashkent Open the following week, also without dropping a set, completing 10 successive straight-sets wins in a couple of weeks. In the final she beat local hero Akgul Amanmuradova. After these wins, Pe'er's world ranking increased to No. 34.

Pe'er was the fifth seed in the new HP Open in Osaka. She was defeated in the first round by world No. 61 Sania Mirza. Pe'er then made the semi-finals of the BGL Luxembourg Open where she lost to Sabine Lisicki.

At the Tournament of Champions, Pe'er's final tournament of the year, she defeated Magdaléna Rybáriková in the first round robin match but then lost to top seed Marion Bartoli, thus failing to make the semifinal.

Pe'er ended the year with a win–loss record of 41–23. She finished the year ranked No. 30 in the world.

=== 2010 ===
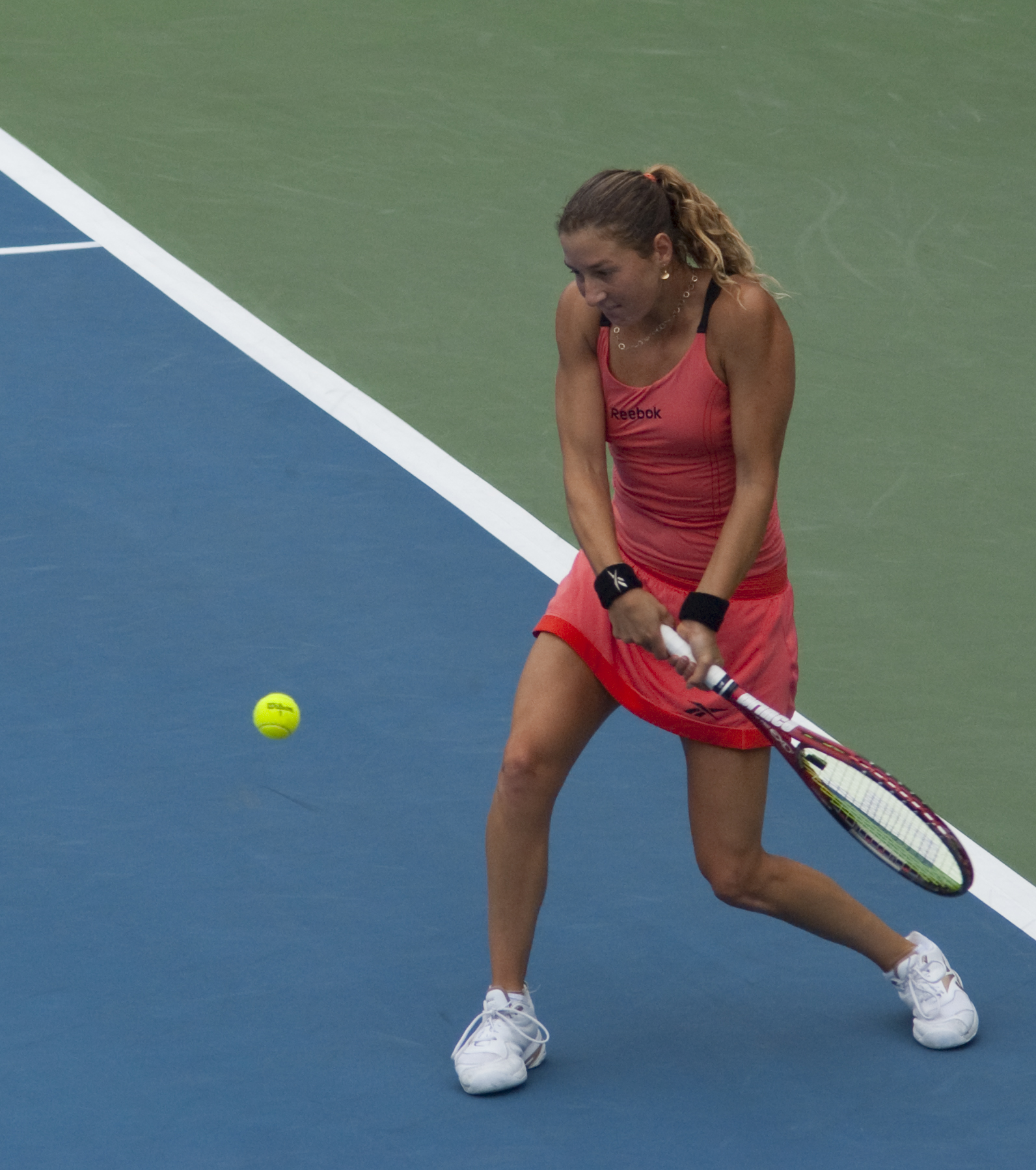
Pe'er at the 2010 ASB Classic

Pe'er started her 2010 season by reaching the semifinals of the ASB Classic before losing to Yanina Wickmayer. At the 2010 Moorilla Hobart International, Pe'er made it to the finals, before losing to Alona Bondarenko in straight sets.

At the Australian Open, Pe'er was seeded 29th. She advanced to the third round before losing to fourth seeded Caroline Wozniacki. However, after the tournament, Pe'er's ranking moved up to world No. 22.

Pe'er then competed at the Open GDF Suez where she was seeded sixth. She made it to the quarterfinals before losing to Lucie Šafářová.

Pe'er continued her excellent start to the 2010 season at the Premier 5 event in Dubai where she reached the semifinals before losing to Venus Williams. Along the way, she defeated 13th seeded Yanina Wickmayer and world No. 3 and top seed Caroline Wozniacki. Despite her semifinal defeat, Pe'er's success in Dubai moved her ranking back into the top twenty.

Pe'er was seeded 17th at the BNP Paribas Open. She advanced to the fourth round before losing to eventual champion Jelena Janković. At the Sony Ericsson Open, Pe'er made it to the third round before being defeated by world No. 16 and eventual champion Kim Clijsters.

Beginning her clay court season, Pe'er made it to the semifinals of the Porsche Tennis Grand Prix by defeating Polona Hercog, world No. 8 Agnieszka Radwańska and world No. 3 Dinara Safina to continue her exceptional wins over top players this season. She again lost to the eventual champion Justine Henin. This marked the sixth time in eight tournaments that Pe'er was defeated by eventual champions.

Pe'er's next tournament was the Italian Open in Rome where she was seeded 16th. She advanced to the third round before losing to fourth seeded Venus Williams.

Unseeded at the Madrid Open, a Premier Mandatory event, Pe'er caused an upset in the first round, defeating 2009 French Open Champion and fifth seed Svetlana Kuznetsova. She then advanced to the semifinals before losing again to Venus Williams for the third time in 2010.

Pe'er was seeded 18th leading into the French Open, the second Grand Slam of the year. She advanced to the fourth round before losing to world No. 1 Serena Williams in straight sets. Because of her showing, Pe'er achieved a new career-high ranking of world No. 14, which was also the highest ranking ever achieved by an Israeli tennis player.

Beginning the grass-court season at the Aegon International at Eastbourne, Pe'er lost in the first round to Zheng Jie, which marked her first first-round loss of the season. Pe'er was seeded 13th at the 2010 Wimbledon Championships, and advanced to the second round before being upset by Angelique Kerber in three sets.

Pe'er next played at the Bank of the West Classic in Stanford, the opening tournament of the 2010 US Open Series where she was seeded sixth. However, she only made it to the second round before being defeated by Maria Kirilenko in straight sets. At the Mercury Insurance Open in San Diego, Pe'er was seeded seventh. Here she advanced to the quarterfinals before losing to world No. 9 Agnieszka Radwańska.

At the 2010 Western & Southern Financial Group Masters and Women's Open in Cincinnati, Pe'er was seeded 13th. She advanced to the third round before losing to 19-year-old Anastasia Pavlyuchenkova in three sets. Playing in her final US Open Series, Pe'er was seeded 14th at the Rogers Cup in Montreal, but was upset in the first round, by Kaia Kanepi.

Pe'er was seeded 16th at the US Open, the final Grand Slam of the season. She held her seeding by advancing to the round of 16, but once again lost to Venus Williams for the fourth time this season.

Following the US Open, Pe'er chose not to defend the back-to-back titles she won in 2009 at the Guangzhou International Women's Open and the Tashkent Open. This caused her ranking to fall to world No. 19. She returned to the tour at the Pan Pacific Open in Tokyo. As the 13th seed, Pe'er advanced to the second round before losing to world No. 25 Kaia Kanepi.

Pe'er then headed to Beijing to compete in the China Open, which is the final Premier Mandatory event of the season. She advanced to the semifinals before losing to the new world No. 1 and eventual champion Caroline Wozniacki. Based on her strong showing in this tournament, her ranking increased to world No. 13, a new career-high.

Due to her great success, Pe'er qualified as the second alternate at the 2010 WTA Tour Championships.

=== 2011 ===
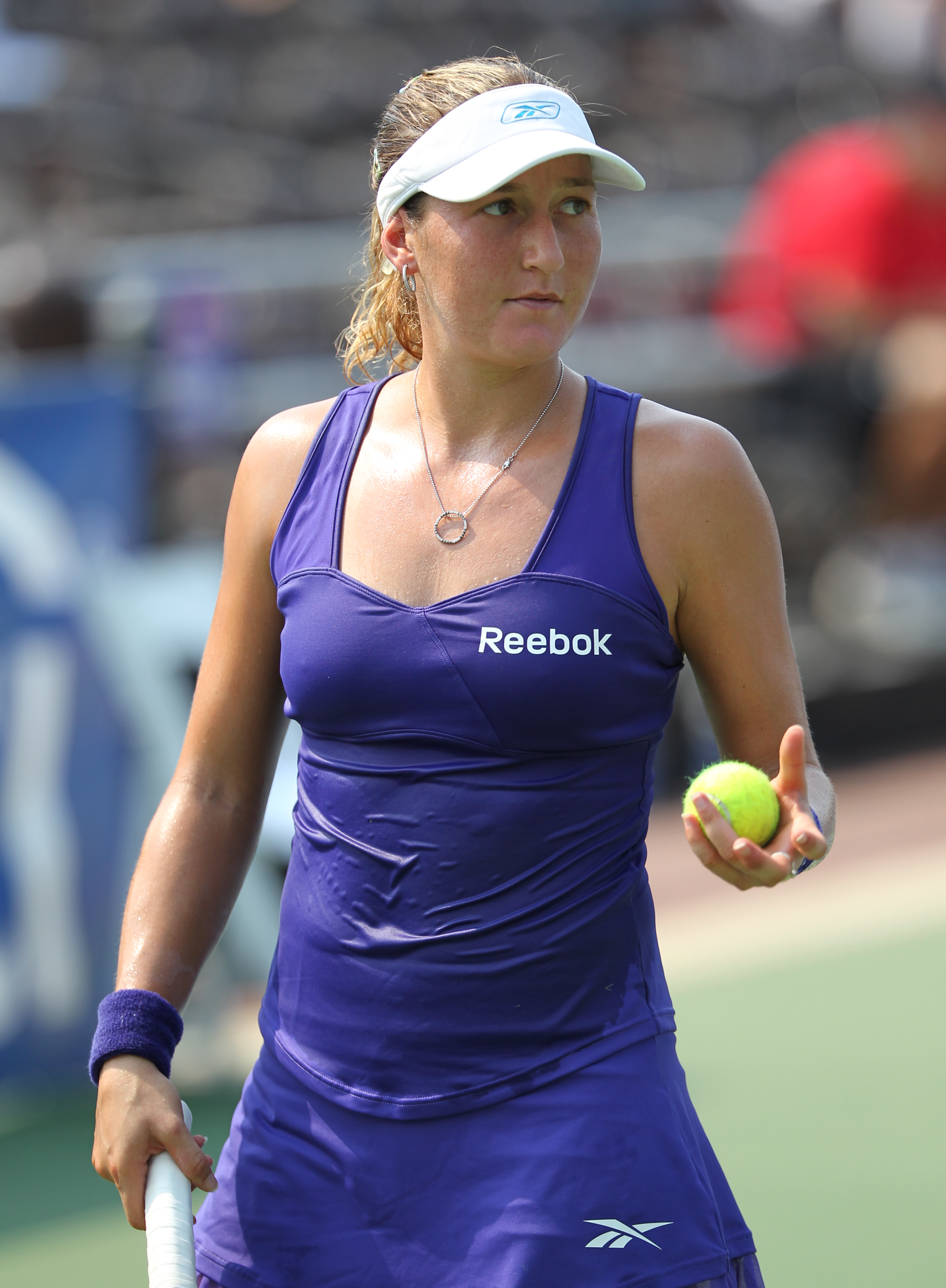
Pe'er at the 2011 Citi Open

Pe'er started the year by playing in Brisbane, where she defeated Sophie Ferguson, 6–4, 6–2, but lost to Lucie Šafářová in the second round. She played in Sydney next, winning against Sybille Bammer, but losing the second round to Victoria Azarenka.

In the 2011 Australian Open, which she started as the No. 10 seed, Pe'er won her first round match against Mathilde Johansson, 6–1, 6–1. In the second round she defeated Sorana Cîrstea in straight sets. However, she lost in the third round to Flavia Pennetta. After the tournament, Pe'er's ranking rose to No. 11, her highest in her career so far, due to Elena Dementieva and Justine Henin leaving the WTA rankings.

Pe'er played herself into form at the Dubai Tennis Championships, where she reached the semifinals in 2010, losing in the quarterfinals to top-ranked Caroline Wozniacki. She then lost in the second round of the Qatar Ladies Open to Marion Bartoli 6–1, 6–0. In March, she reached BNP Paribas Open quarterfinal after beating Bethanie Mattek-Sands, Anastasia Pavlyuchenkova and 2010 French Open champion Francesca Schiavone, all in marathon three-set matches. In the quarterfinals, she lost to Yanina Wickmayer in straight sets, 6–3, 6–3.

In April, she had a chance to become a top 10 player if she could defeat world No. 35 Julia Görges in the third round at the Family Circle Cup in Charleston, but she lost to the German 6–2, 6–3. Pe'er's best result in the next several tournaments came at the Italian Open where she reached the third round before losing 6–2, 6–2 to eventual champion Maria Sharapova.

Coming into the French Open, Pe'er possessed a 14–10 win–loss record on the season. However, her loss to Sharapova began a five-match losing streak, including in the first rounds of Roland Garros and Wimbledon, and a loss to world No. 429 Casey Dellacqua. Pe'er came into Wimbledon as the 22nd seed before her three-set loss to unseeded Russian Ksenia Pervak in the first round.

Pe'er entered into the Citi Open as the top seed in College Park, Maryland, one of the two opening events for the 2011 US Open Series. She won two successive matches in straight and won her match against Tamira Paszek 3–6, 7–6, 6–4 after around 3 hours marathon. In the final she lost to the second seed Nadia Petrova, 5–7, 2–6.

=== 2012 ===
Pe'er began her 2012 season at the Brisbane International. She lost in the first round to second seed and last year finalist, Andrea Petkovic. Seeded sixth at the Moorilla Hobart International, she reached the semifinals where she was defeated by top seed Yanina Wickmayer. At the Australian Open, she was eliminated in the second round by fourteenth seed Sabine Lisicki.

In February, Pe'er competed at the Open GDF Suez in France. She was beaten in the first round by sixth seed Julia Görges. At the Qatar Open, she upset eighth seed Jelena Janković in the second round. She lost in the third round to Christina McHale.

=== 2014–2015 ===
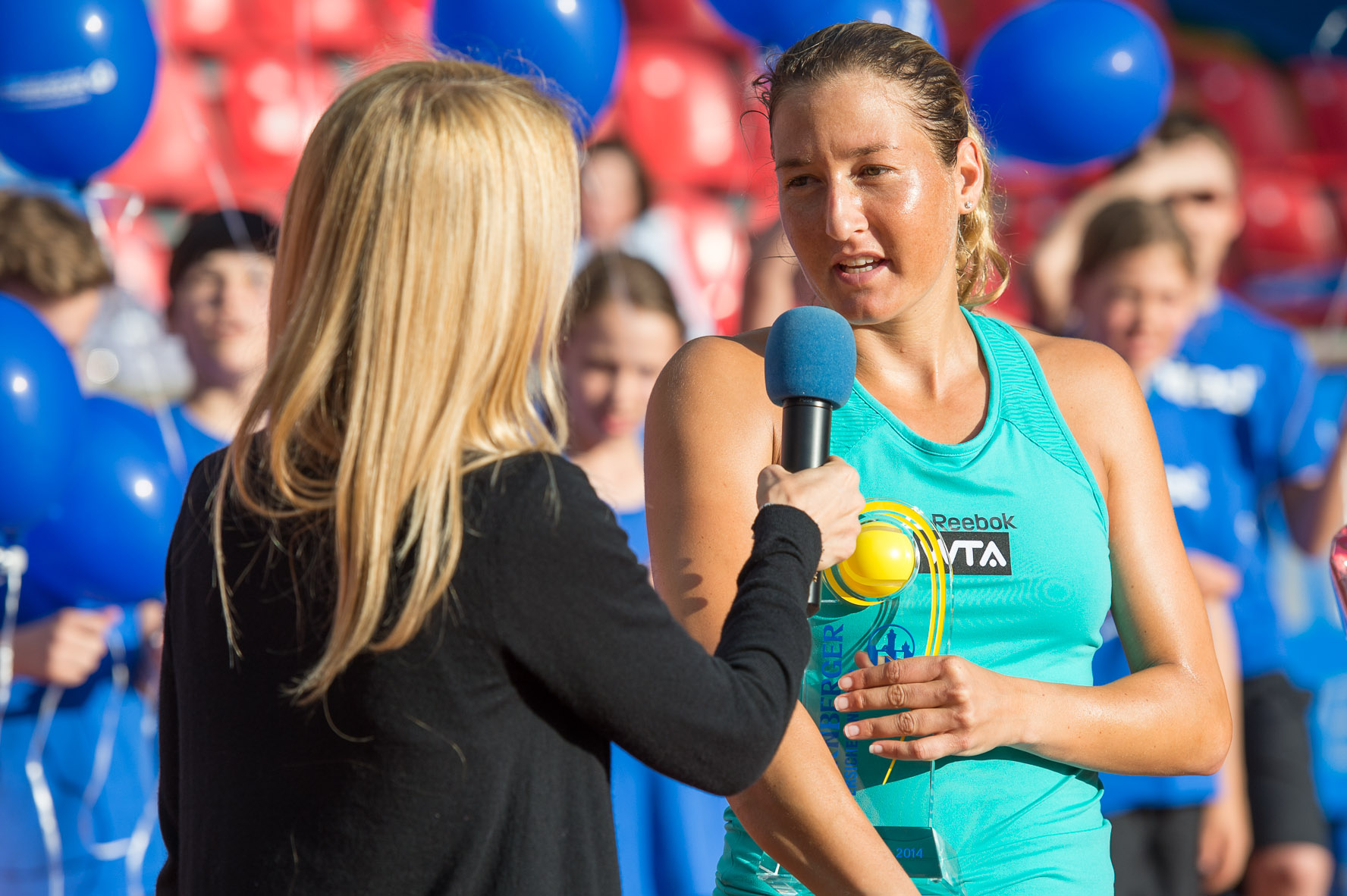
Pe'er in 2014

Pe'er competed at the 2015 Wimbledon Championships.

=== Tournaments in Dubai, 2009–2010 ===
In February 2009, Pe'er (ranked No. 45 in the world at the time) was prevented from playing at the Dubai Tennis Championships by the United Arab Emirates (UAE), which denied her a visa. The UAE did not have diplomatic relations with Israel at that time.

A number of players, among them Venus Williams, condemned the visa rejection. The 2008 winner of the men's singles, Andy Roddick, withdrew from the tournament and chose not to defend his title (with prize money of over $2 million) to protest the UAE's refusal to grant Pe'er a visa. "I really didn't agree with what went on over there", Roddick said. In protest, the Tennis Channel decided not to televise the event and The Wall Street Journal dropped its sponsorship. WTA chief Larry Scott said that he had considered cancelling the tournament, but chose not to after consulting Pe'er.

Tournament director Salah Tahlak said that Pe'er was refused on the grounds that her appearance could incite anger in the Arab country after she had already faced protests at the ASB Classic over the 2008–2009 Israel–Gaza conflict. The WTA said that it would review future tournaments in Dubai.

Following the protests over the UAE's decision to refuse her visa in 2009, Pe'er was granted a visa in 2010 but was placed under very strict restrictions. She was not allowed to mix with other players off the court, was required to exercise in a separate gym, and was under strict guard on her way from the hotel to the court. To add to the pressure, the tournament took place at the time when Dubai authorities were investigating the killing of Hamas military commander Mahmoud al-Mabhouh, which the UAE blamed on Israeli agents, some posing as European tennis fans. Pe'er was widely praised by her fellow competitors for her composure under pressure during the tournament. In particular, Venus Williams remarked: "I can't imagine playing so well with these kinds of circumstances. I just have to give her congratulations and props. She's courageous. I don't think anyone else on the WTA Tour could do what she's doing".

== Playing style ==
Pe'er originally played with a "counter-puncher" style, but by 2010 she had adopted a more attacking style of play. Her forehand uses a semi-western grip, which makes her good in facing big top-spin opponents. Her backhand is two-handed and is one of the best on the women's tour. It is consistent and finds various angles throughout the court. She loves to take many points with the inside out shot on her backhand. She originally used a kick serve that lacked the drive needed to penetrate deep, but she changed it to more of a slice serve, which works great for her now and even generates aces. She has a good volley and doesn't have a problem going to the net. During matches, she often turns her back to her opponent between points, faces the back of the court, closes her eyes and tries to wipe the mental slate clean.

== Federation Cup ==
Pe'er is 21–12 in Fed Cup matches for Israel in 2002–09, having won 13 of her last 16 singles matches. She tasted victory again in 2009 beating both the Bondarenko sisters of Ukraine in Kharkiv. However, Israel fell short in the series 2–3 losing in the decisive doubles match.

== After retirement ==
Pe'er retired in February 2017, one year after her last match. A chronic shoulder injury limited her over her prior two-and-a-half years, and that coupled with a loss of desire to play tennis and lead the life of a professional tennis player led her to decide to retire.

In 2018, Pe'er married Dr. Eilon Ram. They had a son in 2019 and a daughter in 2021.

In 2021, she participated in the second season of the show The Singer in the Mask (the Israeli production of The Masked Singer) as the Parrot and was the first to be eliminated.

== Honors ==
In 2014 Pe'er was honored as one of the torchbearers in the national Israeli Independence Day ceremony.

== Career statistics ==
=== Grand Slam singles performance timeline ===
Key
W	F	SF	QF	#R	RR	Q#	DNQ	A	NH

(W) winner; (F) finalist; (SF) semifinalist; (QF) quarterfinalist; (#R) rounds 4, 3, 2, 1; (RR) round-robin stage; (Q#) qualification round; (DNQ) did not qualify; (A) absent; (NH) not held; (SR) strike rate (events won / competed); (W–L) win–loss record.

Tournament	2004	2005	2006	2007	2008	2009	2010	2011	2012	2013	2014	2015	2016	W–L	SR
Australian Open	A	Q3	1R	QF	3R	1R	3R	3R	2R	2R	1R	Q3	Q1	12–9	0 / 10
French Open	A	3R	4R	4R	1R	A	4R	1R	2R	1R	1R	Q3		12–9	0 / 9
Wimbledon	A	2R	2R	3R	4R	2R	2R	1R	1R	Q3	1R	Q3		9–9	0 / 9
US Open	Q2	3R	4R	QF	1R	3R	4R	2R	1R	Q1	2R	Q1		16–9	0 / 9
Win–loss	0–0	5–3	7–4	13–4	5–4	3–3	9–4	3–4	2–4	1–2	1–4	0–0	0–0	49–36	0 / 37

=== Grand Slam tournament finals ===
==== Doubles: 1 (0–1) ====
Result	Year	Championship	Surface	Partner	Opponents	Score
Loss	2008	Australian Open	Hard	(Belarus) Victoria Azarenka	(Ukraine) Alona Bondarenko (Ukraine) Kateryna Bondarenko	6–2, 1–6, 4–6

== See also ==
- List of select Jewish tennis players
- List of Israelis
- Sport in Israel
