= Alizé Cornet career statistics =

Career finals
Discipline	Type	Won	Lost	Total	WR
Singles	Grand Slam	–	–	–	–
Singles	Summer Olympics	–	–	–	–
Singles	WTA Finals	–	–	–	–
Singles	WTA 1000	0	1	1	0.00
Singles	WTA Tour	6	8	14	0.43
Singles	Total	6	9	15	0.40
Doubles	Grand Slam	–	–	–	–
Doubles	Summer Olympics	–	–	–	–
Doubles	WTA Finals	–	–	–	–
Doubles	WTA 1000	–	–	–	–
Doubles	WTA Tour	3	4	7	0.43
Doubles	Total	3	4	7	0.43
Total		9	13	22	0.41

This is a list of the main career statistics of professional French tennis player Alizé Cornet.

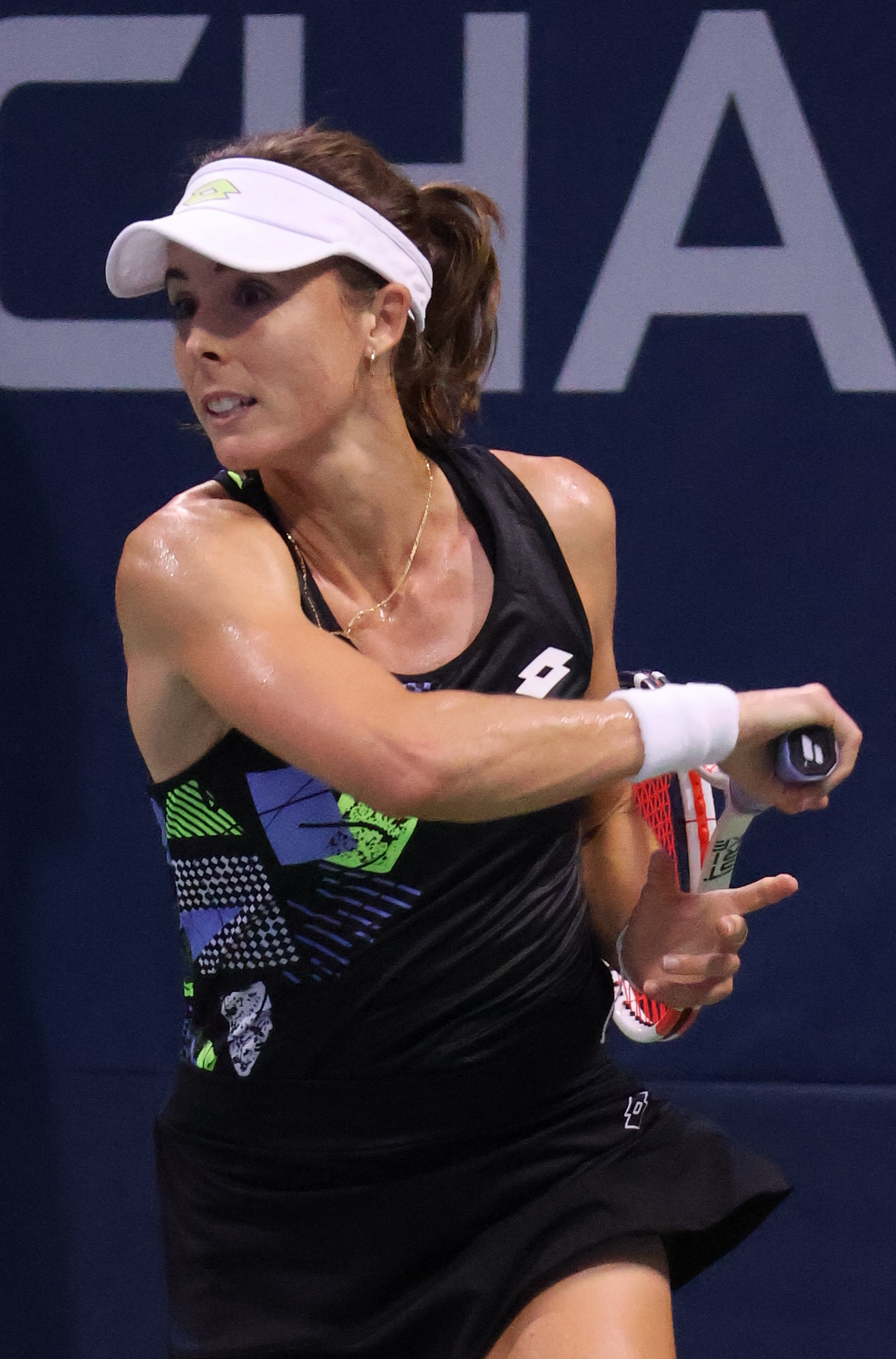
Cornet at the 2023 US Open

== Performance timelines ==
Key
W	F	SF	QF	#R	RR	Q#	P#	DNQ	A	Z#	PO	G	S	B	NMS	NTI	P	NH

(W) winner; (F) finalist; (SF) semifinalist; (QF) quarterfinalist; (#R) rounds 4, 3, 2, 1; (RR) round-robin stage; (Q#) qualification round; (P#) preliminary round; (DNQ) did not qualify; (A) absent; (Z#) Davis/Fed Cup Zonal Group (with number indication) or (PO) play-off; (G) gold, (S) silver or (B) bronze Olympic/Paralympic medal; (NMS) not a Masters tournament; (NTI) not a Tier I tournament; (P) postponed; (NH) not held; (SR) strike rate (events won / competed); (W–L) win–loss record.
To avoid confusion and double counting, these charts are updated at the conclusion of a tournament or when the player's participation has ended.

Only main-draw results in WTA Tour, Grand Slam tournaments, Billie Jean King Cup, United Cup, Hopman Cup and Olympic Games are included in win–loss records.

=== Singles ===
Current through the 2023 Tunis Open.

Tournament	2005	2006	2007	2008	2009	2010	2011	2012	2013	2014	2015	2016	2017	2018	2019	2020	2021	2022	2023	2024	SR	W–L	Win%
Grand Slam tournaments
Australian Open	A	1R	1R	2R	4R	1R	3R	1R	2R	3R	3R	2R	2R	3R	2R	2R	2R	QF	1R	1R	0 / 19	22–19	54%
French Open	2R	2R	1R	3R	2R	1R	2R	1R	3R	2R	4R	3R	4R	2R	1R	2R	1R	3R	1R	1R	0 / 20	21–20	51%
Wimbledon	A	A	2R	1R	1R	1R	1R	2R	3R	4R	2R	3R	1R	1R	1R	NH	2R	4R	2R	A	0 / 16	15–16	48%
US Open	A	A	3R	3R	2R	1R	2R	2R	3R	3R	1R	1R	2R	1R	2R	4R	1R	3R	1R	A	0 / 17	18–17	51%
Win–loss	1–1	1–2	3–4	5–4	5–4	0–4	4–4	2–4	7–4	8–4	6–4	5–4	5–4	3–4	2–4	5–3	2–4	11–4	1–4	0–2	0 / 72	76–72	51%
National representation
Summer Olympics	NH			3R	NH			2R	NH			2R	NH				1R	NH		A	0 / 4	4–4	50%
Billie Jean King Cup (Note: Formerly known as Fed Cup until 2020.)	A	A	A	1R	1R	1R	1R	WG2	WG2	PO	SF	F	1R	A	W	RR (Note: Edition is split into the two years due to COVID-19.)		QR	RR	A	1 / 9	7–16	30%
Year-end championships
WTA Elite Trophy (Note: WTA Tournament of Champions was held from 2009 to 2014, when WTA Elite Trophy replaced it.)	NH				DNQ				RR	RR	DNQ					NH			DNQ		0 / 2	2–4	33%
WTA 1000 + former
Dubai / Qatar Open (Note: The first Premier 5 event of the year has switched back and forth between the Dubai Tennis Championships and the Qatar Open since 2009. Dubai was classified as a Premier 5 event from 2009 to 2011 before being succeeded by Doha for the 2012–2014 period. In 2015, Dubai regained its Premier 5 status while Doha was demoted to Premier status. The Premier 5 tournaments were reclassified as WTA 1000 tournaments in 2021.)	NMS			A	3R	A	A	A	A	A	3R	A	A	2R	2R	A	2R	2R	1R	A	0 / 7	8–7	53%
Indian Wells Open	A	A	A	A	2R	1R	3R	Q2	2R	4R	3R	A	A	1R	1R	NH	2R	2R	1R	Q1	0 / 11	7–11	39%
Miami Open	A	A	A	1R	3R	2R	1R	1R	4R	3R	3R	2R	1R	2R	3R	NH	2R	2R	A	Q1	0 / 14	11–14	44%
Madrid Open	NH				1R	1R	Q1	A	2R	1R	2R	2R	1R	1R	2R	NH	Q1	1R	2R	A	0 / 11	5–11	31%
Italian Open	A	A	A	F	2R	A	Q1	A	1R	2R	1R	1R	2R	A	2R	A	1R	1R	2R	A	0 / 11	9–11	45%
Canadian Open	A	A	A	A	1R	Q3	A	A	3R	2R	3R	1R	1R	3R	A	NH	A	2R	A	A	0 / 8	8–8	50%
Cincinnati Open	NMS				1R	A	Q1	A	2R	1R	1R	2R	2R	2R	Q1	3R	A	1R	Q2	A	0 / 9	6–9	40%
Guadalajara Open	NH																	1R	NMS	A	0 / 1	0–1	0%
Pan Pacific / Wuhan Open (Note: In 2014, the Toray Pan Pacific Open was downgraded to a Premier event and replaced by the Wuhan Open. The Premier 5 tournaments were reclassified as WTA 1000 tournaments in 2021.)	A	A	A	2R	1R	A	A	1R	1R	QF	1R	1R	QF	1R	A	NH				A	0 / 9	7–9	44%
China Open	NMS				2R	A	A	1R	1R	3R	1R	3R	3R	1R	A	NH			A	A	0 / 8	7–8	47%
Charleston Open (former)	A	A	A	SF	NMS																0 / 1	4–1	80%
Berlin Open (former)	A	A	A	1R	NMS/NH																0 / 1	0–1	0%
Kremlin Cup (former)	A	A	A	1R	NMS/NH																0 / 1	0–1	0%
Win–loss	0–0	0–0	0–0	9–6	5–9	1–3	2–2	0–3	7–8	10–8	7–9	5–7	7–7	5–8	5–5	2–1	3–4	2–8	2–4	1–7	0 / 99	73–99	42%
Career statistics
	2005	2006	2007	2008	2009	2010	2011	2012	2013	2014	2015	2016	2017	2018	2019	2020	2021	2022	2023	2024	SR	W–L	Win%
Tournaments	1	2	9	23	24	20	17	21	27	24	26	22	22	25	20	9	24	23	18	7	Career total: 364		
Titles	0	0	0	1	0	0	0	1	1	1	0	1	0	1	0	0	0	0	0	0	Career total: 6		
Finals	0	0	0	3	0	0	0	2	1	3	0	1	1	1	1	1	1	1	0	0	Career total: 15		
Hard win–loss	0–0	0–1	2–4	13–13	16–17	6–9	8–10	9–14	19–17	33–22	19–18	16–14	20–15	12–16	13–14	11–7	17–16	17–17	4–9	1–3	2 / 216	236–236	50%
Clay win–loss	1–1	1–1	5–4	22–8	6–10	11–11	3–6	11–5	15–9	2–5	6–6	3–6	4–5	10–5	7–6	2–2	3–6	4–4	6–7	0–4	4 / 110	122–111	52%
Grass win–loss	0–0	0–0	1–1	0–2	0–2	0–1	0–2	2–2	2–2	4–2	1–3	2–2	0–3	1–3	4–3	NH	5–3	6–3	5–4	0–0	0 / 38	33–38	46%
Overall win–loss	1–1	1–2	8–9	35–23	22–29	17–21	11–18	22–21	36–28	39–29	26–27	21–22	24–23	23–24	24–23	13–9	25–25	27–24	15–20	1–7	6 / 364	391–385	50%
Win (%)	50%	33%	47%	60%	43%	45%	38%	51%	56%	57%	49%	49%	51%	49%	51%	59%	50%	53%	43%	13%	Career total: 50%		
Year-end ranking (Note: 2004: WTA ranking–861.)	308	189	57	16	50	78	89	44	27	20	43	46	38	47	60	53	59	36	118		$10,230,231		

=== Doubles ===
Current after the 2023 French Open.

Tournament	2006	2007	2008	2009	2010	2011	2012	2013	2014	2015	2016	2017	2018	2019	2020	2021	2022	2023	2024	SR	W–L	Win%
Grand Slam tournaments
Australian Open	A	A	1R	2R	1R	1R	1R	1R	3R	1R	1R	2R	1R	3R	1R	A	1R	1R	A	0 / 15	6–15	29%
French Open	1R	1R	2R	1R	2R	1R	1R	1R	1R	2R	2R	1R	1R	2R	1R	A	A (Note: Planned for playing alongside Dianne Parry but they withdraw in the last minute. As a result, no alternative was chosen.)	3R	1R	0 / 17	7–17	29%
Wimbledon	A	A	1R	1R	A	1R	1R	2R	2R	1R	2R	1R	1R	3R (Note: Cornet and Petra Martic withdrew before third-round match at the 2019 Wimbledon, not count as loss.)	NH	A	2R	A	A	0 / 12	6–11	35%
US Open	A	A	1R	1R	1R	A	1R	2R	1R	1R	1R	1R	1R	1R	A	2R	1R	1R	A	0 / 14	2–14	13%
Win–loss	0–1	0–1	1–4	1–4	1–3	0–3	0–4	2–4	3–4	1–4	2–4	1–4	0–4	3–3	0–2	1–1	1–3	2–3	0–1	0 / 58	21–57	27%
National representation
Summer Olympics	Not Held		1R	Not Held			1R	Not Held			A	Not Held				2R	Not Held		A	0 / 3	1–3	25%
WTA 1000
Dubai / Qatar Open	A	A	A	A	A	A	A	A	A	A	A	A	2R	A	A	A	A	A	A	0 / 1	1–1	50%
Indian Wells Open	A	A	A	A	A	A	A	A	A	A	A	A	A	1R	A	NH	A	SF	A	0 / 2	2–2	50%
Miami Open	A	A	A	A	A	A	A	A	A	1R	A	A	A	A	NH	A	QF	A	A	0 / 2	2–2	50%
Madrid Open	NH			A	A	1R	A	1R	A	1R	A	A	1R	A	NH	A	QF	A	A	0 / 5	2–5	29%
Canadian Open	A	A	A	A	A	A	A	A	A	A	A	A	A	A	NH	A	1R	A	A	0 / 1	0–1	0%
Cincinnati Open	NMS			A	A	A	A	A	A	A	A	A	2R	QF	A	A	1R	A	A	0 / 3	3–3	50%
Pan Pacific / Wuhan Open	A	A	A	A	A	A	A	A	A	A	1R	A	1R	A	NH				A	0 / 2	0–2	0%
China Open	NMS			A	A	A	1R	A	1R	1R	A	2R	2R	A	NH			A	A	0 / 5	2–5	29%
Guadalajara Open	NH																1R	A	NMS	0 / 1	0–1	0%
Career statistics
Tournaments	1	1	7	9	10	11	17	10	9	12	7	9	11	5	2	3	10	4	2	Career total: 136		
Titles	0	0	1	0	1	0	0	0	0	1	0	0	0	0	0	0	0	0	0	Career total: 3		
Finals	0	0	1	0	1	1	0	0	1	1	0	1	0	0	0	0	1	0	0	Career total: 7		
Overall win–loss	0–1	0–1	6–7	3–9	9–10	10–12	8–17	4–10	8–9	8–11	4–7	6–9	4–11	7–4	0–2	4–5	10–10	2–4	1–2	3 / 140	94–141	40%
Year-end ranking	n/a	325	134	177	81	87	89	174	109	108	157	116	151	109	186	283	67	317				

== Significant finals ==
=== Tier I / Premier Mandatory & Premier 5 / WTA 1000 finals ===
==== Singles: 1 (1 runner-up) ====
Result	Year	Tournament	Surface	Opponent	Score
Loss	2008	Italian Open	Clay	(Serbia) Jelena Janković	2–6, 2–6

== WTA career finals ==
=== Singles: 15 (6 titles, 9 runner-ups) ===
Legend Grand Slam WTA 1000 (0–1) WTA 500 (0–2) WTA 250 (6–6)	Surface Hard (2–5) Clay (4–4) Grass Carpet

Result	W–L	Date	Tournament	Tier	Surface	Opponent	Score
Loss	0–1	Mar 2008	Mexican Open, Mexico	Tier III (Note: The WTA Tier III tournaments, WTA Tier IV tournaments and WTA Tier V tournaments were reclassified as WTA International tournaments in 2009 and later as WTA 250 tournaments in 2021.)	Clay	(Italy) Flavia Pennetta	0–6, 6–4, 1–6
Loss	0–2	May 2008	Italian Open, Italy	Tier I (Note: The WTA Tier I tournaments were reclassified as WTA Premier 5 & Mandatory tournaments and later as WTA 1000 tournaments in 2021.)	Clay	(Serbia) Jelena Janković	2–6, 2–6
Win	1–2	Jul 2008	Budapest Grand Prix, Hungary	Tier V	Clay	(Slovenia) Andreja Klepač	7–6^{(7–5)}, 6–3
Loss	1–3	May 2012	Internationaux de Strasbourg, France	International	Clay	(Italy) Francesca Schiavone	4–6, 4–6
Win	2–3	Jun 2012	Austrian Open, Austria	International	Clay	(Belgium) Yanina Wickmayer	7–5, 7–6^{(7–1)}
Win	3–3	May 2013	Internationaux de Strasbourg, France	International	Clay	(Czech Republic) Lucie Hradecká	7–6^{(7–4)}, 6–0
Loss	3–4	Feb 2014	Dubai Championships, UAE	Premier (Note: The WTA Premier tournaments were reclassified as WTA 500 tournaments in 2021.)	Hard	(United States) Venus Williams	3–6, 0–6
Win	4–4	Apr 2014	Katowice Open, Poland	International	Hard (i)	(Italy) Camila Giorgi	7–6^{(7–3)}, 5–7, 7–5
Loss	4–5	Sep 2014	Guangzhou Open, China	International	Hard	(Romania) Monica Niculescu	4–6, 0–6
Win	5–5	Jan 2016	Hobart International, Australia	International	Hard	(Canada) Eugenie Bouchard	6–1, 6–2
Loss	5–6	Jan 2017	Brisbane International, Australia	Premier	Hard	(Czech Republic) Karolína Plíšková	0–6, 3–6
Win	6–6	Jul 2018	Swiss Open, Switzerland	International	Clay	(Luxembourg) Mandy Minella	6–4, 7–6^{(8–6)}
Loss	6–7	Jul 2019	Swiss Open, Switzerland	International	Clay	(France) Fiona Ferro	1–6, 6–2, 1–6
Loss	6–8	Aug 2021	Chicago Open, United States	WTA 250	Hard	(Ukraine) Elina Svitolina	5–7, 4–6
Loss	6–9	Oct 2022	Jasmin Open, Tunisia	WTA 250	Hard	(Belgium) Elise Mertens	2–6, 0–6

=== Doubles: 7 (3 titles, 4 runner-ups) ===
Legend Grand Slam WTA 1000 WTA 500 (0–2) WTA 250 (3–2)	Surface Hard (1–3) Clay (2–0) Grass (0–1) Carpet

Result	W–L	Date	Tournament	Tier	Surface	Partner	Opponents	Score
Win	1–0	Jul 2008	Budapest Grand Prix, Hungary	Tier III	Clay	(Slovakia) Janette Husárová	(Romania) Ioana Raluca Olaru (Germany) Vanessa Henke	6–7^{(5–7)}, 6–1, [10–6]
Win	2–0	May 2010	Internationaux de Strasbourg, France	International	Clay	(United States) Vania King	(Russia) Alla Kudryavtseva (Australia) Anastasia Rodionova	3–6, 6–4, [10–7]
Loss	2–1	Aug 2011	Texas Open, United States	International	Hard	(France) Pauline Parmentier	(Italy) Alberta Brianti (Romania) Sorana Cîrstea	5–7, 3–6
Loss	2–2	Sep 2014	Guangzhou Open, China	International	Hard	(Poland) Magda Linette	(Chinese Taipei) Chuang Chia-jung (China) Liang Chen	6–2, 6–7^{(3–7)}, [7–10]
Win	3–2	Oct 2015	Hong Kong Open, China SAR	International	Hard	(Kazakhstan) Yaroslava Shvedova	(Spain) Lara Arruabarrena (Slovenia) Andreja Klepač	7–5, 6–4
Loss	3–3	Aug 2017	Silicon Valley Classic, United States	Premier	Hard	(Poland) Alicja Rosolska	(United States) Abigail Spears (United States) CoCo Vandeweghe	2–6, 3–6
Loss	3–4	Jun 2022	German Open, Germany	WTA 500	Grass	(Switzerland) Jil Teichmann	(Australia) Storm Sanders (Czech Republic) Kateřina Siniaková	4–6, 3–6

- Tournaments sourced from official WTA archives

== ITF Circuit finals ==
=== Singles: 7 (3 titles, 4 runner–ups) ===
Legend $100,000 tournaments (0–3) $60,000 tournaments (1–0) $25,000 tournaments (2–1)	Finals by surface Hard (0–1) Clay (3–3) Grass (0–0) Carpet (0–0)

Result	W–L	Date	Tournament	Tier	Surface	Opponent	Score
Win	1–0	Apr 2006	ITF Bari, Italy	25,000	Clay	(Italy) Tathiana Garbin	6–2, 3–6, 6–2
Win	2–0	Jul 2006	ITF Padova, Italy	25,000	Clay	(Argentina) Vanina García Sokol	6–1, 6–4
Loss	2–1	Jul 2006	ITF Rome, Italy	25,000	Clay	(Hungary) Kira Nagy	2–6, 7–6^{(7–5)}, 4–6
Win	3–1	Jul 2007	ITF Dnipropetrovsk, Ukraine	50,000 (Note: The $50,000 ITF tournaments were reclassified as $60,000 in 2017.)	Clay	(Switzerland) Stefanie Vögele	6–4, 6–3
Loss	3–2	Sep 2007	ITF Bordeaux, France	100,000+H	Clay	(Bulgaria) Tsvetana Pironkova	2–6, 3–6
Loss	3–3	Sep 2010	ITF Saint-Malo, France	100,000+H	Clay	(Switzerland) Romina Oprandi	2–6, 6–2, 2–6
Loss	3–4	Mar 2012	ITF Nassau, Bahamas	100,000+H	Hard	(Canada) Aleksandra Wozniak	4–6, 5–7

=== Doubles: 4 (3 titles, 1 runner–up) ===
Legend $100,000 tournaments (3–0) $60,000 tournaments (0–1)	Finals by surface Hard (1–1) Clay (2–0) Grass (0–0) Carpet (0–0)

Result	W–L	Date	Tournament	Tier	Surface	Partner	Opponents	Score
Loss	0–1	Oct 2006	ITF Saint-Raphaël, France	50,000	Hard	(France) Youlia Fedossova	(Ukraine) Mariya Koryttseva (Kazakhstan) Galina Voskoboeva	2–6, 4–6
Win	1–1	Oct 2011	ITF Vienne, France	100,000	Hard	(France) Virginie Razzano	(Russia) Maria Kondratieva (France) Sophie Lefèvre	6–3, 6–2
Win	2–1	May 2012	ITF Prague, Czech Republic	100,000	Clay	(France) Virginie Razzano	(Uzbekistan) Akgul Amanmuradova (Australia) Casey Dellacqua	6–2, 6–3
Win	3–1	Jul 2012	ITF Bucharest, Romania	100,000	Clay	(Romania) Irina-Camelia Begu	(Romania) Elena Bogdan (Romania) Raluca Olaru	6–2, 6–0

=== Team competition: 1 (1 title, 1 runner-up) ===
Result	W–L	Date	Team competition	Surface	Partner/team	Opponents	Score
Win	1–0	Jan 2014	Hopman Cup, Australia	Hard	(France) Jo-Wilfried Tsonga	(Poland) Agnieszka Radwańska (Poland) Grzegorz Panfil	2–1
Loss	1–1	Nov 2016	Fed Cup, France	Hard (i)	(France) Caroline Garcia (France) Kristina Mladenovic (France) Pauline Parmentier	(Czech Republic) Karolína Plíšková (Czech Republic) Lucie Hradecká (Czech Republic) Petra Kvitová (Czech Republic) Barbora Strýcová	2–3

- Tournaments sourced from official ITF archives

== WTA Tour career earnings ==
Current through the 2022 Australian Open.

Year	Grand Slam titles	WTA titles	Total titles	Earnings ($)	Money list rank
2007	0	0	0	158,605	95
2008	0	1	1	506,891	34
2009	0	0	0	349,192	62
2010	0	0	0	208,586	88
2011	0	0	0	246,729	78
2012	0	1	1	322,285	69
2013	0	1	1	684,893	34
2014	0	1	1	1,163,655	23
2015	0	0	0	682,321	46
2016	0	1	1	626,111	53
2017	0	0	0	842,144	44
2018	0	1	1	680,149	55
2019	0	0	0	622,345	67
2020	0	0	0	499,897	41
2021	0	0	0	551,017	69
2022	0	0	0	421,836	7
Career	0	6	6	8,668,433	66

== Career Grand Slam statistics ==
=== Career Grand Slam seedings ===
The tournaments won by Cornet are in boldface, and advanced into finals by Cornet are in italics.

Year	Australian Open	French Open	Wimbledon	US Open
2005	did not play	wild card	did not play	did not play
2006	wild card	wild card	did not play	did not play
2007	qualifier	wild card	lucky loser	qualifier
2008	not seeded	19th	17th	17th
2009	15th	21st	22nd	not seeded
2010	not seeded	not seeded	not seeded	not seeded
2011	not seeded	not seeded	not seeded	not seeded
2012	not seeded	not seeded	not seeded	not seeded
2013	not seeded	31st	29th	26th
2014	25th	20th	25th	22nd
2015	19th	29th	25th	27th
2016	not seeded	not seeded	not seeded	not seeded
2017	28th	not seeded	not seeded	not seeded
2018	not seeded	32nd	not seeded	not seeded
2019	not seeded	not seeded	not seeded	not seeded
2020	not seeded	not seeded	cancelled	not seeded
2021	not seeded	not seeded	not seeded	not seeded
2022	not seeded	not seeded	not seeded	not seeded

=== Best Grand Slam results details ===
Grand Slam winners are in boldface, and runner–ups are in italics.

== Wins against top 10 players ==
#	Player	Rank	Event	Surface	Rd	Score	Rank
2008
1.	(Russia) Svetlana Kuznetsova	5	Italian Open, Italy	Clay	3R	6–2, 6–4	34
2.	(Russia) Anna Chakvetadze	8	Italian Open, Italy	Clay	SF	3–6, 6–4, 6–3	34
2014
3.	(Romania) Simona Halep	9	Dubai Championships, UAE	Hard	1R	6–1, 1–1 ret.	26
4.	(United States) Serena Williams	1	Dubai Championships, UAE	Hard	SF	6–4, 6–4	26
5.	(Poland) Agnieszka Radwańska	3	Katowice Open, Poland	Hard (i)	SF	0–6, 6–2, 6–4	22
6.	(United States) Serena Williams	1	Wimbledon, United Kingdom	Grass	3R	1–6, 6–3, 6–4	24
7.	(United States) Serena Williams	1	Wuhan Open, China	Hard	2R	5–6 ret.	21
2015
8.	(Romania) Simona Halep	2	Madrid Open, Spain	Clay	1R	7–6^{(8–6)}, 6–3	27
9.	(Spain) Carla Suárez Navarro	10	Canadian Open, Canada	Hard	1R	6–3, 6–7^{(2–7)}, 6–4	28
2016
10.	(Slovakia) Dominika Cibulková	8	China Open, China	Hard	2R	6–2, 5–7, 6–2	58
2017
11.	(Slovakia) Dominika Cibulková	5	Brisbane International, Australia	Hard	QF	6–3, 7–5	41
12.	(Spain) Garbiñe Muguruza	7	Brisbane International, Australia	Hard	SF	4–1 ret.	41
13.	(Poland) Agnieszka Radwańska	10	French Open, France	Clay	3R	6–2, 6–1	43
14.	(Russia) Svetlana Kuznetsova	8	Wuhan Open, China	Hard	2R	6–3, 6–3	42
2018
15.	(France) Caroline Garcia	8	Brisbane International, Australia	Hard	1R	3–6, 6–3, ret.	38
16.	(France) Caroline Garcia	7	Charleston Open, United States	Clay	3R	5–7, 6–1, 6–4	37
17.	(Germany) Angelique Kerber	4	Canadian Open, Canada	Hard	2R	6–4, 6–1	34
2019
18.	(Belarus) Aryna Sabalenka	10	Italian Open, Italy	Clay	1R	6–1, 6–4	53
19.	(Ukraine) Elina Svitolina	8	Eastbourne International, UK	Grass	2R	6–3, 7–6^{(7–3)}	55
2020
20.	(United States) Sofia Kenin	4	Cincinnati Open, United States	Hard	2R	6–1, 7–6^{(9–7)}	60
2021
21.	(Canada) Bianca Andreescu	7	Berlin Open, Germany	Grass	2R	7–6^{(7–2)}, 7–5	63
22.	(Canada) Bianca Andreescu	7	Wimbledon, United Kingdom	Grass	1R	6–2, 6–1	58
2022
23.	(Spain) Garbine Muguruza	3	Australian Open, Australia	Hard	2R	6–3, 6–3	61
24.	(Poland) Iga Świątek	1	Wimbledon, United Kingdom	Grass	3R	6–4, 6–2	37
2023
25.	(Greece) Maria Sakkari	8	Nottingham Open, United Kingdom	Grass	2R	6–1, 6–4	72

== Exhibition Finals ==
Result	Date	Tournament	Surface	Opponent	Score
Loss	Aug 2020	Ultimate Tennis Showdown, Sophia Antipolis, France	Hard	(Russia) Anastasia Pavlyuchenkova	8–16, 11–12, 14–11, 16–9, 1–3
