= 2008 Budapest Grand Prix =

- Date: 7 – 13 July
- Edition: 13th
- Category: Tier III Series
- Draw: 30S / 16D
- Prize money: $175,000
- Surface: Clay / Outdoor
- Location: Budapest, Hungary

Champions

Singles
- (France) Alizé Cornet

Doubles
- (France) Alizé Cornet / (Slovakia) Janette Husárová
← 2007 ·	Hungarian Ladies Open	· 2009 →

The 2008 Budapest Grand Prix was a women's tennis tournament played on outdoor clay courts. It was the 13th edition of the Budapest Grand Prix, and was part of the Tier III Series of the 2008 WTA Tour. It took place in Budapest, Hungary, from 7 July until 13 July 2008. Second-seeded Alizé Cornet won the singles title and earned $28,000 first-prize money.

== Finals ==
=== Singles ===
(France) Alizé Cornet defeated (Slovenia) Andreja Klepač, 7–6^{(7–5)}, 6–3

- It was Cornet's only singles title of the year and the 1st of her career.

=== Doubles ===
(France) Alizé Cornet / (Slovakia) Janette Husárová defeated (Germany) Vanessa Henke / (Romania) Ioana Raluca Olaru, 6–7^{(5–7)}, 6–1, [10–6]
