= Gisela Dulko career statistics =

Career finals
Discipline	Type	Won	Lost	Total
Singles	Grand Slam	–	–	–
Singles	Summer Olympics	–	–	–
Singles	WTA Finals (Note: Formerly known as: Virginia Slims Championships (until 1995); WTA Tour Championships (until 2014))	–	–	–
Singles	WTA Elite (Note: Elite tier: WTA Tournament of Champions (2009–14); WTA Elite Trophy (2015–present))	–	–	–
Singles	WTA 1000 (Note: Formerly known as: Category 4 & 5 & 6 (until 1990); Tier I (until 2009); WTA Premier Mandatory and 5 (until 2021))	–	–	–
Singles	WTA 500 (Note: Formerly known as: Category 3 (until 1990); Tier II (until 2009); WTA Premier (until 2021))	–	–	–
Singles	WTA 250 (Note: Formerly known as: Category 1 & 2 (until 1990); Tier III & IV & V (until 2009); WTA International (until 2021))	4	4	8
Singles	Total	4	4	8
Doubles	Grand Slam	1	0	1
Doubles	Summer Olympics	–	–	–
Doubles	WTA Finals	1	0	1
Doubles	WTA Elite	–	–	–
Doubles	WTA 1000	3	5	8
Doubles	WTA 500	3	5	8
Doubles	WTA 250	9	3	12
Doubles	Total	17	13	30
Mixed doubles	Grand Slam	0	1	1
Mixed doubles	Total	0	1	1
Total		21	18	39

This is a list of the main career statistics of professional Argentine tennis player Gisela Dulko.

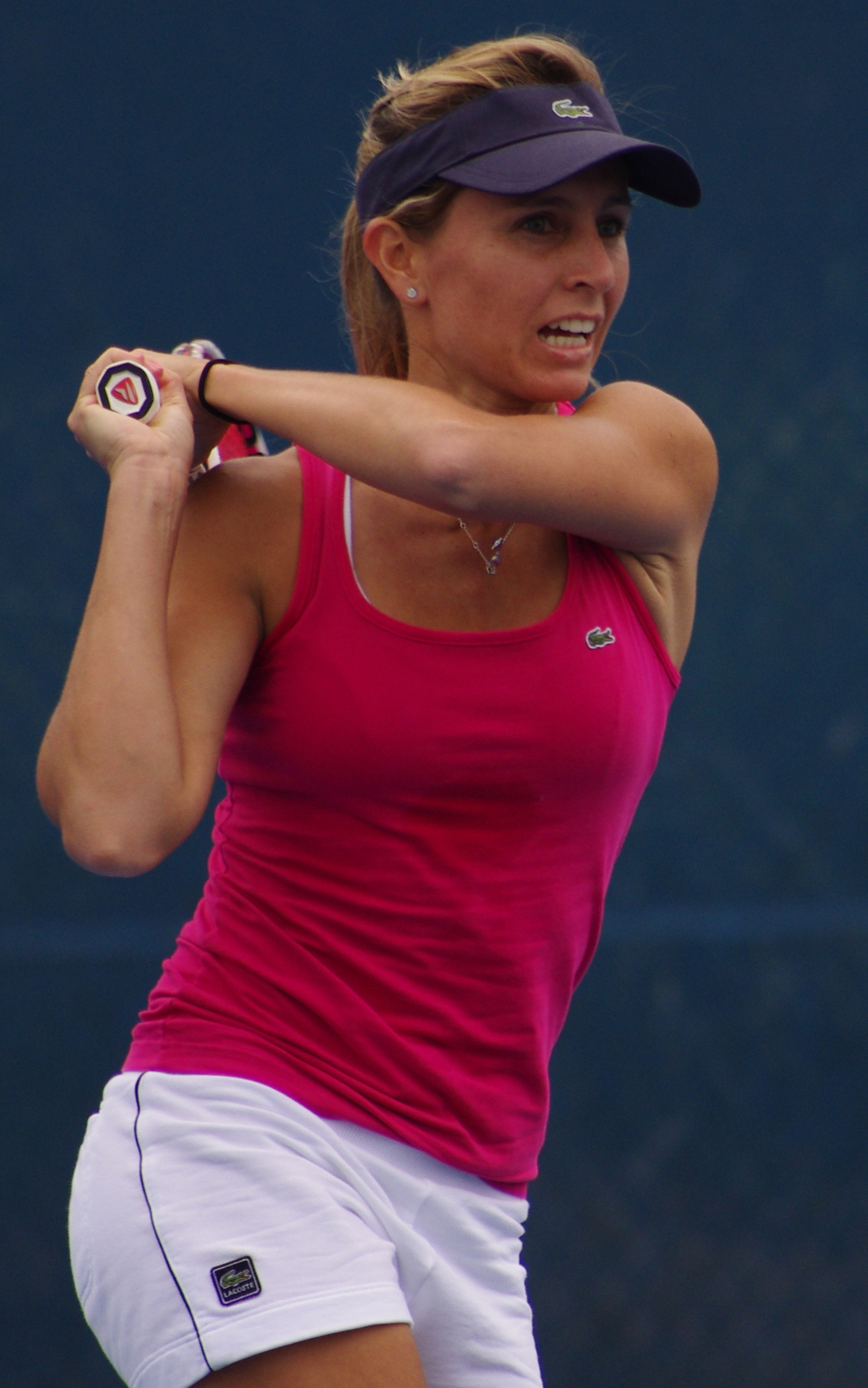
Dulko in 2012

== Performance timelines ==
Key
W	F	SF	QF	#R	RR	Q#	P#	DNQ	A	Z#	PO	G	S	B	NMS	NTI	P	NH

(W) winner; (F) finalist; (SF) semifinalist; (QF) quarterfinalist; (#R) rounds 4, 3, 2, 1; (RR) round-robin stage; (Q#) qualification round; (P#) preliminary round; (DNQ) did not qualify; (A) absent; (Z#) Davis/Fed Cup Zonal Group (with number indication) or (PO) play-off; (G) gold, (S) silver or (B) bronze Olympic/Paralympic medal; (NMS) not a Masters tournament; (NTI) not a Tier I tournament; (P) postponed; (NH) not held; (SR) strike rate (events won / competed); (W–L) win–loss record.
To avoid confusion and double counting, these charts are updated at the conclusion of a tournament or when the player's participation has ended.

Only main-draw results in WTA Tour, Grand Slam tournaments, Billie Jean King Cup (Fed Cup), Hopman Cup and Olympic Games are included in win–loss records.

=== Singles ===
Tournament	2000	2001	2002	2003	2004	2005	2006	2007	2008	2009	2010	2011	2012	SR	W–L	Win%
Grand Slam tournaments
Australian Open	A	A	Q1	A	1R	2R	2R	2R	1R	2R	3R	1R	1R	0 / 9	6–9	40%
French Open	A	A	Q2	1R	3R	2R	4R	2R	2R	3R	2R	4R	Q1	0 / 9	14–9	61%
Wimbledon	A	A	Q1	Q2	3R	2R	3R	1R	3R	3R	1R	A	Q2	0 / 7	8–7	53%
US Open	A	A	Q2	Q2	2R	2R	1R	1R	1R	4R	3R	2R	A	0 / 8	8–8	50%
Win–loss	0–0	0–0	0–0	0–1	5–4	4–4	6–4	2–4	2–4	8–4	5–4	4–3	0–1	0 / 33	36–33	52%
National representation
Summer Olympics	A	NH			1R	NH			1R	NH				0 / 2	0–2	0%
WTA 1000 + former^{†} tournaments
Dubai / Qatar Open (Note: The first Premier 5 event of the year has switched back and forth between the Dubai Tennis Championships and the Qatar Total Open since 2009. Dubai was classified as a Premier 5 event from 2009 to 2011 before being succeeded by Doha for the 2012–2014 period. In 2015, Dubai regained its Premier 5 status while Doha was demoted to Premier status. The Premier 5 tournaments were reclassified as WTA 1000 tournaments in 2021.)	NMS								A	A	A	A	A	0 / 0	0–0	–
Indian Wells Open	A	Q2	Q2	1R	QF	2R	QF	2R	2R	3R	3R	2R	2R	0 / 10	13–10	57%
Miami Open	A	1R	2R	Q1	4R	3R	2R	1R	1R	3R	3R	1R	1R	0 / 11	8–11	42%
Berlin / Madrid Open (Note: In 2009, the Berlin Open was replaced by the Madrid Open. The Premier Mandatory tournaments were reclassified as WTA 1000 tournaments in 2021.)	A	A	A	A	2R	2R	1R	A	3R	1R	1R	1R	Q1	0 / 7	4–7	36%
Italian Open	A	A	A	A	1R	3R	1R	1R	1R	2R	1R	1R	Q2	0 / 8	3–8	27%
Canadian Open	A	A	A	A	3R	QF	1R	1R	A	Q2	1R	1R	A	0 / 6	5–6	45%
Cincinnati Open	NH/NMS									1R	2R	1R	A	0 / 3	1–3	25%
Pan Pacific Open	A	A	A	A	A	A	A	1R	A	2R	1R	1R	A	0 / 4	1–4	20%
China Open	NH/NMS									A	2R	1R	A	0 / 2	1–2	33%
Charleston Open^{†}	A	A	A	A	A	A	A	2R	2R	NMS				0 / 2	2–2	50%
Southern California Open^{†}	A	A	A	A	3R	2R	2R	1R	A	NH				0 / 4	4–4	50%
Kremlin Cup^{†}	A	A	A	A	A	A	A	2R	A	NMS				0 / 1	1–1	50%
Zurich Open^{†}	A	A	A	A	A	1R	Q2	A	NH/NMS					0 / 1	0–1	0%
Win–loss	0–0	0–1	1–1	0–1	11–6	8–7	4–6	3–8	4–5	5–6	5–8	1–8	1–2	0 / 59	43–59	42%
Career statistics
	2000	2001	2002	2003	2004	2005	2006	2007	2008	2009	2010	2011	2012	SR	W–L	Win%
Tournaments	0 (Note: During the season, she did not play in the main-draw of any WTA Tour-level tournaments. However, she played at the Fed Cup that is not counted as a played tournament but matches counted.)	1	3	7	19	23	23	25	22	20	21	16	5	Career total: 185		
Titles	0	0	0	0	0	0	0	2	1	0	0	1	0	Career total: 4		
Finals	0	0	0	0	0	1	0	3	1	1	1	1	0	Career total: 8		
Hard win–loss	0–0	0–1	1–2	0–1	17–12	21–17	7–14	17–13	3–13	14–9	11–12	6–11	1–4	1 / 108	98–109	47%
Clay win–loss	0–1	0–0	3–1	4–4	5–7	9–6	7–8	16–8	13–5	14–9	10–8	11–4	1–1	3 / 61	93–62	60%
Grass win–loss	0–0	0–0	0–0	0–1	2–2	4–2	3–2	0–2	3–2	2–2	0–1	0–0	0–0	0 / 14	14–14	50%
Carpet win–loss	0–0	0–0	0–0	1–1	0–0	0–0	0–0	0–1	0–0	0–0	0–0	0–0	0–0	0 / 2	1–2	33%
Overall win–loss	0–1	0–1	4–3	5–7	24–21	34–25	17–24	33–24	19–20	30–20	21–21	17–15	2–5	4 / 185	206–187	52%
Year End Ranking	585	186	152	124	33	27	61	38	51	37	49	68		$4,246,105		

=== Doubles ===
Tournament	2000	2001	2002	2003	2004	2005	2006	2007	2008	2009	2010	2011	2012	SR	W–L	Win%
Grand Slam tournaments
Australian Open	A	A	A	A	2R	2R	QF	3R	1R	2R	QF	W	3R	1 / 9	19–8	70%
French Open	A	A	A	2R	3R	2R	3R	QF	1R	2R	QF	QF	2R	0 / 10	17–10	63%
Wimbledon	A	A	1R	1R	3R	1R	1R	1R	2R	2R	SF	A	1R	0 / 10	6–10	38%
US Open	A	A	A	1R	1R	3R	1R	3R	2R	3R	QF	3R	A	0 / 9	12–9	57%
Win–loss	0–0	0–0	0–1	1–3	4–4	4–4	5–4	7–4	2–4	5–4	12–4	11–2	3–3	1 / 38	54–37	59%
National representation
Summer Olympics	A	NH			A	NH			2R	NH			1R	0 / 2	1–2	33%
Year-end championships
WTA Tour Championships	A	A	A	A	A	A	A	A	A	A	W	SF	A	0 / 2	2–1	67%
WTA 1000 + former^{†} tournaments
Dubai / Qatar Open	A	A	NMS						A	A	A	A	A	0 / 0	0–0	–
Indian Wells Open	A	Q1	2R	A	1R	1R	1R	2R	2R (Note: Withdraw during the tournament. Not counted as a loss.)	F	2R	2R	QF	0 / 10	11–9	55%
Miami Open	A	A	1R	A	2R	2R	1R	1R	1R	2R	W	QF	SF	1 / 10	12–8	60%
Berlin / Madrid Open	A	A	A	A	2R	SF	2R	A	2R	2R	F	2R	QF	0 / 8	13–7	65%
Italian Open	A	A	A	A	2R	QF	QF	1R	1R	A (Note: Was part of the draw but did not play any match.)	W	QF	2R	1 / 8	12–7	63%
Canadian Open	A	A	A	A	2R	2R	2R	QF	A	1R	W	SF	A	1 / 7	11–5	69%
Cincinnati Open	NH/NMS									2R	SF	QF	1R	0 / 4	4–4	50%
Pan Pacific Open	A	A	A	A	A	A	A	SF	A	SF	QF	F	A	0 / 4	8–4	67%
China Open	NH/NMS									A	F	F	A	0 / 2	6–2	75%
Charleston Open^{†}	A	A	A	A	A	A	A	SF	1R	NMS				0 / 2	2–2	50%
Southern California Open^{†}	A	A	A	A	2R	1R	1R	2R	A	NH				0 / 4	2–4	33%
Zurich Open^{†}	A	A	A	A	A	A	1R	A	NH/NMS					0 / 1	0–1	0%
Win–loss	0–0	0–0	1–2	0–0	5–5	7–5	4–7	8–7	2–4	9–5	24–5	14–8	7–5	3 / 60	81–53	60%
Career statistics
	2000	2001	2002	2003	2004	2005	2006	2007	2008	2009	2010	2011	2012	SR	W–L	Win%
Tournaments	0	0	4	9	19	21	23	22	17	16	22	15	14	Career total: 182		
Titles	0	0	0	1	0	3	2	0	0	2	8	1	0	Career total: 17		
Finals	0	0	1	1	2	4	4	0	0	5	10	3	0	Career total: 30		
Hard win–loss	0–0	0–0	1–2	0–1	13–9	19–12	17–12	15–11	3–8	15–8	29–9	22–11	8–6	10 / 104	142–89	61%
Clay win–loss	3–0	0–0	3–1	7–5	8–6	7–5	12–5	7–6	1–6	14–4	23–4	6–4	8–5	7 / 59	99–51	66%
Grass win–loss	0–0	0–0	0–1	0–1	1–2	1–2	2–2	1–1	1–2	1–2	3–1	0–0	0–2	0 / 17	10–16	38%
Carpet win–loss	0–0	0–0	0–0	1–1	0–0	0–0	0–0	2–1	0–0	0–0	0–0	0–0	0–0	0 / 2	3–2	60%
Overall win–loss	3–0	0–0	4–4	8–8	22–17	27–19	31–19	25–19	5–16	30–14	55–14	28–15	16–13	17 / 182	254–158	62%
Year-end ranking			125	96	34	26	29	23	132	27	1	9	46			

== Significant finals ==
=== Grand Slams ===
==== Doubles: 1 title ====
Result	Year	Championship	Surface	Partner	Opponents	Score
Win	2011	Australian Open	Hard	(Italy) Flavia Pennetta	(Belarus) Victoria Azarenka (Russia) Maria Kirilenko	2–6, 7–5, 6–1

==== Mixed doubles: 1 runner–up ====
Result	Year	Championship	Surface	Partner	Opponents	Score
Loss	2011	US Open	Hard	(Argentina) Eduardo Schwank	(United States) Melanie Oudin (United States) Jack Sock	7–6^{(7–4)}, 4–6, [10–8]

=== WTA Finals ===
==== Doubles: 1 title ====
Result	Year	Championship	Surface	Partner	Opponents	Score
Win	2010	WTA Tour Championships, Doha	Hard	(Italy) Flavia Pennetta	(Czech Republic) Květa Peschke (Slovenia) Katarina Srebotnik	7–5, 6–4

=== WTA 1000 ===
==== Doubles: 8 (3 titles, 5 runner–ups) ====
Result	Year	Tournament	Surface	Partner	Opponents	Score
Loss	2009	Indian Wells Open	Hard	(Israel) Shahar Pe'er	(Belarus) Victoria Azarenka (Russia) Vera Zvonareva	6–4, 3–6, [10–5]
Win	2010	Miami Open	Hard	(Italy) Flavia Pennetta	(Russia) Nadia Petrova (Australia) Samantha Stosur	6–3, 4–6, [10–7]
Win	2010	Italian Open	Clay	(Italy) Flavia Pennetta	(Spain) Nuria Llagostera Vives (Spain) María José Martínez Sánchez	6–4, 6–2
Loss	2010	Madrid Open	Clay	(Italy) Flavia Pennetta	(United States) Serena Williams (United States) Venus Williams	6–2, 7–5
Win	2010	Canadian Open	Hard	(Italy) Flavia Pennetta	(Czech Republic) Květa Peschke (Slovenia) Katarina Srebotnik	7–5, 3–6, [12–10]
Loss	2010	China Open	Hard	(Italy) Flavia Pennetta	(Chinese Taipei) Chuang Chia-Jung (Belarus) Olga Govortsova	7–6^{(7–2)}, 1–6, [10–7]
Loss	2011	Pan Pacific Open	Hard	(Italy) Flavia Pennetta	(United States) Liezel Huber (United States) Lisa Raymond	7–6^{(7–4)}, 0–6, [10–6]
Loss	2011	China Open	Hard	(Italy) Flavia Pennetta	(Czech Republic) Květa Peschke (Slovenia) Katarina Srebotnik	3–6, 4–6

== WTA Tour finals ==
=== Singles: 8 (4 titles, 4 runner–ups) ===
Legend WTA 250 (Tier IV / Tier V / International) (4–4)	Finals by surface Hard (1–2) Clay (3–2)

Result	W–L	Date	Tournament	Tier	Surface	Opponent	Score
Loss	0–1	Jan 2005	Hobart International, Australia	Tier V	Hard	(China) Zheng Jie	6–2, 6–0
Loss	0–2	Feb 2007	Pattaya Open, Thailand	Tier IV	Hard	(Austria) Sybille Bammer	7–5, 3–6, 7–5
Win	1–2	Apr 2007	Budapest Grand Prix, Hungary	Tier IV	Clay	(Romania) Sorana Cîrstea	6–7^{(2–7)}, 6–2, 6–2
Win	2–2	Aug 2007	Forest Hills Classic, U.S.	Tier IV	Hard	(France) Virginie Razzano	6–2, 6–2
Win	3–2	May 2008	Morocco Open	Tier IV	Clay	(Spain) Anabel Medina Garrigues	7–6^{(7–2)}, 7–6^{(7–5)}
Loss	3–3	Feb 2009	Copa Colsanitas, Colombia	International	Clay	(Spain) María José Martínez Sánchez	6–3, 6–2
Loss	3–4	Jul 2010	Swedish Open	International	Clay	(France) Aravane Rezaï	6–3, 4–6, 6–4
Win	4–4	Feb 2011	Mexican Open	International	Clay	(Spain) Arantxa Parra Santonja	6–3, 7–6^{(7–5)}

=== Doubles: 30 (17 titles, 13 runner–ups) ===
Legend Grand Slam (1–0) Finals (1–0) WTA 1000 (Premier 5 / Premier M) (3–5) WTA 500 (Tier II / Premier) (3–5) WTA 250 (Tier III / Tier IV / Tier V / International) (9–3)	Finals by surface Hard (10–7) Clay (7–6)

Result	W–L	Date	Tournament	Tier	Surface	Partner	Opponent	Score
Loss	0–1	Jul 2002	Morocco Open	Tier V	Clay	(Spain) Conchita Martínez Granados	(Hungary) Petra Mandula (Austria) Patricia Wartusch	6–2, 6–1
Win	1–1	Apr 2003	Morocco Open	Tier V	Clay	(Argentina) María Emilia Salerni	(Slovakia) Henrieta Nagyová (Ukraine) Elena Tatarkova	6–3, 6–4
Loss	1–2	May 2004	Warsaw Open, Poland	Tier II	Clay	(Argentina) Patricia Tarabini	(Italy) Silvia Farina Elia (Italy) Francesca Schiavone	3–6, 6–2, 6–1
Loss	1–3	Sep 2004	China Open	Tier II	Hard	(Venezuela) María Vento-Kabchi	(Switzerland) Emmanuelle Gagliardi (Russia) Dinara Safina	6–4, 6–4
Loss	1–4	Aug 2005	Connecticut Open, U.S.	Tier II	Hard	(Russia) Maria Kirilenko	(United States) Lisa Raymond (Australia) Samantha Stosur	6–2, 6–7, 6–1
Win	2–4	Oct 2005	Japan Open	Tier III	Hard	(Russia) Maria Kirilenko	(Japan) Shinobu Asagoe (Venezuela) María Vento-Kabchi	7–5, 4–6, 6–3
Win	3–4	Oct 2005	Bangkok Open, Thailand	Tier III	Hard	(Japan) Shinobu Asagoe	(Spain) Conchita Martínez (Spain) Virginia Ruano Pascual	6–1, 7–5
Win	4–4	Oct 2005	Linz Open, Austria	Tier II	Hard (i)	(Czech Republic) Květa Peschke	(Spain) Conchita Martínez (Spain) Virginia Ruano Pascual	6–2, 6–3
Loss	4–5	May 2006	Estoril Open, Portugal	Tier IV	Clay	(Spain) María Sánchez Lorenzo	(China) Li Ting (China) Sun Tiantian	6–2, 6–2
Win	5–5	Feb 2006	Copa Colsanitas, Colombia	Tier III	Clay	(Italy) Flavia Pennetta	(Hungary) Ágnes Szávay (Germany) Jasmin Wöhr	7–6^{(7–1)}, 6–1
Win	6–5	Jul 2006	Cincinnati Open, United States	Tier III	Hard	(Italy) Maria Elena Camerin	(Poland) Marta Domachowska (India) Sania Mirza	6–4, 3–6, 6–2
Loss	6–6	Jul 2006	Stanford Classic, United States	Tier II	Hard	(Italy) Maria Elena Camerin	(Germany) Anna-Lena Grönefeld (Israel) Shahar Pe'er	6–1, 6–4
Win	7–6	Jan 2009	Hobart International, Australia	International	Hard	(Italy) Flavia Pennetta	(Ukraine) Alona Bondarenko (Ukraine) Kateryna Bondarenko	6–2, 7–6^{(7–4)}
Loss	7–7	Feb 2009	Copa Colsanitas, Colombia	International	Clay	(Italy) Flavia Pennetta	(Spain) Nuria Llagostera Vives (Spain) María José Martínez Sánchez	7–5, 3–6, [10–7]
Loss	7–8	Mar 2009	Indian Wells Open, United States	Premier M	Hard	(Israel) Shahar Pe'er	(Belarus) Victoria Azarenka (Russia) Vera Zvonareva	6–4, 3–6, [10–5]
Loss	7–9	May 2009	Stuttgart Open, Germany	Premier	Clay (i)	(Italy) Flavia Pennetta	(United States) Bethanie Mattek-Sands (Russia) Nadia Petrova	5–7, 6–3, [10–7]
Win	8–9	Jul 2009	Swedish Open	International	Clay	(Italy) Flavia Pennetta	(Spain) Nuria Llagostera Vives (Spain) María José Martínez Sánchez	6–2, 0–6, [10–5]
Win	9–9	Feb 2010	Copa Colsanitas, Colombia	International	Clay	(Romania) Edina Gallovits	(Ukraine) Olga Savchuk (Belarus) Anastasiya Yakimova	6–2, 7–6^{(8–6)}
Win	10–9	Apr 2010	Miami Open, U.S.	Premier M	Hard	(Italy) Flavia Pennetta	(Russia) Nadia Petrova (Australia) Samantha Stosur	6–3, 4–6, [10–7]
Win	11–9	May 2010	Stuttgart Open, Germany	Premier	Clay (i)	(Italy) Flavia Pennetta	(Czech Republic) Květa Peschke (Slovenia) Katarina Srebotnik	3–6, 7–6^{(7–3)}, [10–5]
Win	12–9	May 2010	Italian Open	Premier 5	Clay	(Italy) Flavia Pennetta	(Spain) Nuria Llagostera Vives (Spain) María José Martínez Sánchez	6–4, 6–2
Loss	12–10	May 2010	Madrid Open	Premier M	Clay	(Italy) Flavia Pennetta	(United States) Serena Williams (United States) Venus Williams	6–2, 7–5
Win	13–10	Jul 2010	Swedish Open	International	Clay	(Italy) Flavia Pennetta	(Czech Republic) Renata Voráčová (Czech Republic) Barbora Záhlavová-Strýcová	7–6^{(7–0)}, 6–0
Win	14–10	Aug 2010	Canadian Open (Montreal)	Premier 5	Hard	(Italy) Flavia Pennetta	(Czech Republic) Květa Peschke (Slovenia) Katarina Srebotnik	7–5, 3–6, [12–10]
Loss	14–11	Oct 2010	China Open	Premier M	Hard	(Italy) Flavia Pennetta	(Chinese Taipei) Chuang Chia-jung (Belarus) Olga Govortsova	7–6^{(7–2)}, 1–6, 10–7
Win	15–11	Oct 2010	Kremlin Cup, Russia	Premier	Hard (i)	(Italy) Flavia Pennetta	(Italy) Sara Errani (Spain) María José Martínez Sánchez	6–3, 2–6, [10–6]
Win	16–11	Oct 2010	WTA Tour Championships, Qatar	Finals	Hard	(Italy) Flavia Pennetta	(Czech Republic) Květa Peschke (Slovenia) Katarina Srebotnik	7–5, 6–4
Win	17–11	Jan 2011	Australian Open	Grand Slam	Hard	(Italy) Flavia Pennetta	(Belarus) Victoria Azarenka (Russia) Maria Kirilenko	2–6, 7–5, 6–1
Loss	17–12	Oct 2011	Pan Pacific Open, Japan	Premier 5	Hard	(Italy) Flavia Pennetta	(United States) Liezel Huber (United States) Lisa Raymond	7–6^{(7–4)}, 0–6, [10–6]
Loss	17–13	Oct 2011	China Open	Premier M	Hard	(Italy) Flavia Pennetta	(Czech Republic) Květa Peschke (Slovenia) Katarina Srebotnik	6–3, 6–4

== ITF Circuit finals ==
=== Singles: 8 (6 titles, 2 runner–ups) ===
Legend
$25,000 tournaments
$10,000 tournaments

Result	W–L	Date	Tournament	Tier	Surface	Opponent	Score
Win	1–0	Oct 2000	ITF Montevideo, Uruguay	10,000	Clay	(Argentina) Geraldine Aizenberg	6–1, 6–2
Win	2–0	Jan 2001	ITF Boca Raton, United States	10,000	Hard	(United States) Jolene Watanabe	4–6, 7–5, 7–6^{(7–5)}
Win	3–0	Jan 2001	ITF Miami, United States	10,000	Hard	(United States) Jane Chi	5–7, 6–3, 7–6^{(7–3)}
Win	4–0	Jul 2001	ITF Civitanova, Italy	25,000	Clay	(Slovakia) Eva Fislová	2–6, 6–3, 6–3
Win	5–0	Aug 2001	ITF Rimini, Italy	25,000	Clay	(Hungary) Petra Mandula	1–6, 6–3, 6–1
Win	6–0	Apr 2002	ITF Jackson, United States	25,000	Clay	(Austria) Evelyn Fauth	5–7, 6–1, 6–3
Loss	6–1	Oct 2002	ITF Hallandale Beach, United States	25,000	Clay	(United States) Lindsay Lee-Waters	5–7, 6–3, 1–6
Loss	6–2	Feb 2004	ITF Rockford, United States	25,000	Hard (i)	(United States) Lindsay Lee-Waters	4–6, 5–7

=== Doubles: 12 (6 titles, 6 runner–ups) ===
Legend
$50,000 tournaments
$25,000 tournaments
$10,000 tournaments

Result	W–L	Date	Tournament	Tier	Surface	Partner	Opponents	Score
Win	1–0	Sep 2000	ITF Asuncion, Paraguay	10,000	Clay	(Argentina) Jorgelina Cravero	(Paraguay) Larissa Schaerer (Paraguay) Sarah Tami Masi	4–6, 6–3, 6–3
Win	2–0	Sep 2000	ITF Montevideo, Uruguay	10,000	Clay	(Argentina) Jorgelina Cravero	(Argentina) Geraldine Aizenberg (Argentina) Paula Racedo	6–1, 6–4
Loss	2–1	Jul 2001	ITF Civitanova Marche, Italy	25,000	Clay	(Romania) Edina Gallovits-Hall	(Italy) Gloria Pizzichini (Italy) Antonella Serra Zanetti	3–6, 6–3, 1–6
Loss	2–2	Apr 2002	ITF Naples, United States	50,000	Clay	(Russia) Vera Zvonareva	(Japan) Rika Hiraki (Japan) Nana Smith	5–7, 6–4, 5–7
Loss	2–3	Apr 2002	ITF Jackson, United States	25,000	Clay	(Venezuela) Milagros Sequera	(Australia) Lisa McShea (Australia) Christina Wheeler	2–6, 4–6
Loss	2–4	Jul 2002	ITF Modena, Italy	50,000	Clay	(Spain) Conchita Martínez Granados	(Ukraine) Yuliana Fedak (Russia) Galina Fokina	1–6, 3–6
Loss	2–5	Oct 2002	ITF Fresno, United States	50,000	Hard	(United States) Bea Bielik	(United States) Jennifer Hopkins (United States) Brie Rippner	7–6^{(7–2)}, 4–6, 6–7^{(4–7)}
Win	3–5	Oct 2002	ITF Hallandale Beach, United States	25,000	Hard	(Venezuela) Milagros Sequera	(Czech Republic) Petra Cetkovská (Czech Republic) Barbora Strýcová	6–2, 7–5
Win	4–5	May 2003	ITF Bromma, Sweden	25,000	Clay	(Argentina) María Emilia Salerni	(Hungary) Melinda Czink (Hungary) Zsófia Gubacsi	6–4, 6–3
Loss	4–6	Nov 2003	ITF Pittsburgh, United States	50,000	Hard (i)	(United States) Meilen Tu	(United States) Amy Frazier (Chinese Taipei) Janet Lee	6–3, 1–6, 2–6
Win	5–6	Feb 2004	ITF Waikoloa, United States	50,000	Hard	(Argentina) Patricia Tarabini	(United States) Amanda Augustus (South Africa) Natalie Grandin	1–6, 6–3, 6–3
Win	6–6	Feb 2004	ITF Rockford, United States	25,000	Hard (i)	(Argentina) Mariana Díaz Oliva	(New Zealand) Leanne Baker (Italy) Francesca Lubiani	6–7^{(5–7)}, 6–3, 6–1

== Record against top 10 players ==
=== Top 10 wins ===
Season	2004	2005	...	2009	2010	2011	Total
Wins	3	3		2	0	1	9

#	Player	vsRank	Event	Surface	Round	Score	Rank
2004
1.	(Japan) Ai Sugiyama	10	Fed Cup	Clay	RR	6–3, 6–4	68
2.	(Russia) Svetlana Kuznetsova	9	Fed Cup	Clay	RR	6–4, 3–6, 6–4	52
3.	(Russia) Elena Dementieva	6	Canadian Open (Montreal)	Hard	3R	6–1, 6–4	43
2005
4.	(Russia) Elena Dementieva	5	Italian Open	Clay	3R	7–5, 6–4	37
5.	(Russia) Nadia Petrova	8	Rosmalen Championships, Netherlands	Grass	QF	6–4, 4–6, 6–3	37
6.	(Russia) Svetlana Kuznetsova	4	Canadian Open (Toronto)	Hard	QF	7–6^{(7–3)}, 7–6^{(10–8)}	35
2009
7.	(Serbia) Jelena Janković	3	Miami Open, United States	Hard	3R	6–4, 7–6^{(7–5)}	35
8.	(Belarus) Victoria Azarenka	8	Stuttgart Open, Germany	Clay (i)	QF	6–4, 6–3	34
2011
9.	(Australia) Samantha Stosur	6	French Open	Clay	4R	6–4, 1–6, 6–3	51
