= 2010 Rogers Cup – Men's singles =

Men's singles
- 2010 Rogers Cup

Final
- Champions: (United Kingdom) Andy Murray
- Runners-up: (Switzerland) Roger Federer
- Score: 7–5, 7–5

Events
Singles	men	women
Doubles	men	women
← 2009 ·	Rogers Cup	· 2011 →

Defending champion Andy Murray defeated Roger Federer in the final, 7–5, 7–5 to win the men's singles tennis title at the 2010 Canadian Open. Murray became the first player since Andre Agassi in 1995 to defend the title. It was also the first time in the tournament's history that the top four seeds (in this case the Big Four) reached the semifinals.

== Seeds ==
The top eight seeds receive a bye into the second round.

1. (Spain) Rafael Nadal (semifinals)
2. (Serbia) Novak Djokovic (semifinals)
3. (Switzerland) Roger Federer (final)
4. (United Kingdom) Andy Murray (champion)
5. (Sweden) Robin Söderling (third round)
6. (Russia) Nikolay Davydenko (third round)
7. (Czech Republic) Tomáš Berdych (quarterfinals)
8. (United States) ~~Andy Roddick~~ (withdrew due to glandular fever)
9. (Spain) Fernando Verdasco (second round)
10. (Spain) David Ferrer (first round)
11. (Croatia) Marin Čilić (first round)
12. (Russia) Mikhail Youzhny (second round)
13. (Austria) Jürgen Melzer (first round)
14. (Spain) Nicolás Almagro (second round)
15. (France) Gaël Monfils (third round)
16. (United States) Sam Querrey (second round)

== Main draw ==
=== Key ===
- Q = Qualifier
- WC = Wild card
- LL = Lucky loser
- Alt = Alternate
- SE = Special exempt
- PR = Protected ranking
- ITF = ITF entry
- JE = Junior exempt
- w/o = Walkover
- r = Retired
- d = Defaulted
- SR = Special ranking

=== Finals ===
Quarterfinals
1	(Spain) Rafael Nadal	3	6	6
(Germany) Philipp Kohlschreiber	6	3	4
4	(United Kingdom) Andy Murray	6	6
PR	(Argentina) David Nalbandian	2	2
7	(Czech Republic) Tomáš Berdych	3	7	6^{5}
3	(Switzerland) Roger Federer	6	5	7^{7}
(France) Jérémy Chardy	2	3
2	(Serbia) Novak Djokovic	6	6

Semifinals
1	(Spain) Rafael Nadal	3	4
4	(United Kingdom) Andy Murray	6	6
3	(Switzerland) Roger Federer	6	3	7
2	(Serbia) Novak Djokovic	1	6	5

Final
4	(United Kingdom) Andy Murray	7	7
3	(Switzerland) Roger Federer	5	5

=== Top half ===
==== Section 1 ====
First round
WC	(Canada) F Dancevic	1	4
(Switzerland) S Wawrinka	6	6
(Argentina) L Mayer	6^{2}	4
Q	(South Africa) K Anderson	7^{7}	6
Q	(United States) M Russell	6	1	4
16	(United States) S Querrey	3	6	6
11	(Croatia) M Čilić	4	6^{2}
(Serbia) V Troicki	6	7^{7}
(Serbia) J Tipsarević	2^{r}
(Germany) P Kohlschreiber	2
WC	(Canada) P-L Duclos	4	4
Q	(Chinese Taipei) Y-h Lu	6	6

Second round
1	(Spain) R Nadal	7^{14}	6
(Switzerland) S Wawrinka	6^{12}	3
Q	(South Africa) K Anderson	7^{7}	4	6
16	(United States) S Querrey	6^{4}	6	4
(Serbia) V Troicki	4	6	0
(Germany) P Kohlschreiber	6	3	6
Q	(Chinese Taipei) Y-h Lu	3	7^{7}	7^{7}
LL	(France) P-H Mathieu	6	6^{3}	6^{5}

Third round
1	(Spain) R Nadal	6	7^{8}
Q	(South Africa) K Anderson	2	6^{6}
(Germany) P Kohlschreiber	6^{5}	7	6
Q	(Chinese Taipei) Y-h Lu	7^{7}	5	0

Quarterfinals
1	(Spain) R Nadal	3	6	6
(Germany) P Kohlschreiber	6	3	4

==== Section 2 ====
First round
SE	(Belgium) X Malisse	7^{7}	6
(Germany) M Berrer	6^{2}	2
(Spain) F López	6^{2}	3
(Netherlands) T de Bakker	7^{7}	6
LL	(India) S Devvarman	6^{3}	3
15	(France) G Monfils	7^{7}	6
10	(Spain) D Ferrer	5	6	3
PR	(Argentina) D Nalbandian	7	3	6
(Spain) T Robredo	6	6
Q	(Finland) J Nieminen	1	4
(Latvia) E Gulbis	6	6
(Brazil) T Bellucci	1	4

Second round
4	(United Kingdom) A Murray	7	6
SE	(Belgium) X Malisse	5	2
(Netherlands) T de Bakker	5	3
15	(France) G Monfils	7	6
PR	(Argentina) D Nalbandian	6	6
(Spain) T Robredo	3	0
(Latvia) E Gulbis	6	4	4
5	(Sweden) R Söderling	4	6	6

Third round
4	(United Kingdom) A Murray	6	0	6
15	(France) G Monfils	2	6	3
PR	(Argentina) D Nalbandian	4	6	6
5	(Sweden) R Söderling	6	4	1

Quarterfinals
4	(United Kingdom) A Murray	6	6
PR	(Argentina) D Nalbandian	2	2

=== Bottom half ===
==== Section 3 ====
First round
(Ukraine) S Stakhovsky	7	6
(France) R Gasquet	5	1
(Ukraine) A Dolgopolov	1	6	7^{7}
(Germany) P Petzschner	6	2	6^{4}
(France) G Simon	4	4
12	(Russia) M Youzhny	6	6
14	(Spain) N Almagro	7	5	6
Q	(Ukraine) I Marchenko	5	7	4
(France) M Llodra	7^{8}	7
(Colombia) S Giraldo	6^{6}	5
(Argentina) JI Chela	6	6
(Colombia) A Falla	0	3

Second round
7	(Czech Republic) T Berdych	6	6
(Ukraine) S Stakhovsky	2	4
(Ukraine) A Dolgopolov	1	7^{7}	7
12	(Russia) M Youzhny	6	6^{4}	5
14	(Spain) N Almagro	6^{5}	2
(France) M Llodra	7^{7}	6
(Argentina) JI Chela	6^{7}	3
3	(Switzerland) R Federer	7^{9}	6

Third round
7	(Czech Republic) T Berdych	6	6^{5}	6
(Ukraine) A Dolgopolov	3	7^{7}	4
(France) M Llodra	6^{2}	3
3	(Switzerland) R Federer	7^{7}	6

Quarterfinals
7	(Czech Republic) T Berdych	3	7	6^{5}
3	(Switzerland) R Federer	6	5	7^{7}

==== Section 4 ====
First round
Q	(Italy) F Fognini	6	6
(Czech Republic) R Štěpánek	2	4
(Cyprus) M Baghdatis	5	6	6^{4}
(France) J Chardy	7	2	7^{7}
(Argentina) E Schwank	0	7	2
9	(Spain) F Verdasco	6	5	6
13	(Austria) J Melzer	6^{6}	4
WC	(Canada) P Polansky	7^{8}	6
(Romania) V Hănescu	6	6
WC	(Canada) M Raonic	4	4
Q	(Uzbekistan) D Istomin	4	4
(France) J Benneteau	6	6

Second round
6	(Russia) N Davydenko	7	6
Q	(Italy) F Fognini	5	1
(France) J Chardy	6^{7}	7^{7}	6
9	(Spain) F Verdasco	7^{9}	6^{5}	2
WC	(Canada) P Polansky	4	6^{4}
(Romania) V Hănescu	6	7^{7}
(France) J Benneteau	5	5
2	(Serbia) N Djokovic	7	7

Third round
6	(Russia) N Davydenko	3	2
(France) J Chardy	6	6
(Romania) V Hănescu	3	4
2	(Serbia) N Djokovic	6	6

Quarterfinals
(France) J Chardy	2	3
2	(Serbia) N Djokovic	6	6
