= 2010 Rogers Cup – Men's doubles =

Men's doubles
- 2010 Rogers Cup

Final
- Champion: (United States) Bob Bryan; (United States) Mike Bryan
- Runner-up: (France) Julien Benneteau; (France) Michaël Llodra
- Score: 7–5, 6–3

Details
- Draw: 28
- Seeds: 8

Events
Singles	men	women
Doubles	men	women
- Rogers Cup

Bob Bryan and Mike Bryan won the title, defeating Julien Benneteau and Michaël Llodra 7–5, 6–3 in the final.

Mahesh Bhupathi and Mark Knowles were the defending champions, but they chose to not compete together this year. Bhupathi played with Max Mirnyi and Knowles partnered with Radek Štěpánek.

Rafael Nadal and Novak Djokovic, ranked world No. 1 and No. 2 in singles, respectively, partnered for this event. It was first time that the singles world Nos. 1 and 2 had played together in a tour doubles match since Jimmy Connors and Arthur Ashe did so in 1976. They lost in the first round to the wildcard duo of Vasek Pospisil and Milos Raonic, ranked No. 329 and No. 217 in singles, respectively.

== Seeds ==
The top eight seeds receive a bye into the second round.

1. (Canada) Daniel Nestor / (Serbia) Nenad Zimonjić (quarterfinals)
2. (United States) Bob Bryan / (United States) Mike Bryan (champions)
3. (Czech Republic) Lukáš Dlouhý / (India) Leander Paes (second round)
4. (India) Mahesh Bhupathi / (Belarus) Max Mirnyi (semifinals)
5. (Austria) Jürgen Melzer / (Germany) Philipp Petzschner (quarterfinals)
6. (Poland) Mariusz Fyrstenberg / (Poland) Marcin Matkowski (second round)
7. (Austria) Oliver Marach / (Belgium) Dick Norman (second round)
8. (Austria) Julian Knowle / (Israel) Andy Ram (second round)

== Draw ==
Key

- Q = Qualifier
- WC = Wild card
- LL = Lucky loser
- Alt = Alternate
- ITF = ITF entry
- PR = Protected ranking
- SR = Special ranking
- SE = Special exempt
- JE = Junior exempt
- JR = Junior Accelerator Programme entrant
- CO = College Accelerator Programme entrant
- NG = Next Gen Accelerator Program entrant
- w/o = Walkover
- r = Retired
- d = Defaulted

=== Finals ===
Semifinals

Final

- (Czech Republic) František Čermák
- (Slovakia) Michal Mertiňák
6^{5}
4

- (France) Julien Benneteau
- (France) Michaël Llodra
7^{7}
6

- (France) Julien Benneteau
- (France) Michaël Llodra
5
3

2
- (United States) Bob Bryan
- (United States) Mike Bryan
7
6

4
- (India) Mahesh Bhupathi
- (Belarus) Max Mirnyi
6
3
[4]

2
- (United States) Bob Bryan
- (United States) Mike Bryan
4
6
[10]

=== Top half ===
First round

Second round

Quarterfinals

Semifinals

1
- (Canada) D Nestor
- (Serbia) N Zimonjić
4
6
[10]

- (The Bahamas) M Knowles
- (Czech Republic) R Štěpánek
5
6
[12]

- (The Bahamas) M Knowles
- (Czech Republic) R Štěpánek
6
3
[6]

- (Spain) N Almagro
- (Spain) T Robredo
7
3
[10]

1
- (Canada) D Nestor
- (Serbia) N Zimonjić
3
6^{5}

- (India) R Bopanna
- (United States) E Butorac
6
3
[5]

- (Czech Republic) F Čermák
- (Slovakia) M Mertiňák
6
7^{7}

- (Czech Republic) F Čermák
- (Slovakia) M Mertiňák
3
6
[10]

- (Czech Republic) F Čermák
- (Slovakia) M Mertiňák
3
6
[10]

8
- (Austria) J Knowle
- (Israel) A Ram
6
4
[7]

- (Czech Republic) F Čermák
- (Slovakia) M Mertiňák
6^{5}
4

- (France) J Benneteau
- (France) M Llodra
7^{7}
6

3
- (Czech Republic) L Dlouhý
- (India) L Paes
1
6^{6}

- (Finland) J Nieminen
- (Sweden) R Söderling
3
5

- (France) J Benneteau
- (France) M Llodra
6
7^{8}

- (France) J Benneteau
- (France) M Llodra
6
7

- (France) J Benneteau
- (France) M Llodra
6
6

WC
- (Canada) V Pospisil
- (Canada) M Raonic
5
6
[10]

5
- (Austria) J Melzer
- (Germany) P Petzschner
4
3

- (Serbia) N Djokovic
- (Spain) R Nadal
7
3
[8]

WC
- (Canada) V Pospisil
- (Canada) M Raonic
2
4

5
- (Austria) J Melzer
- (Germany) P Petzschner
6
6

=== Bottom half ===
First round

Second round

Quarterfinals

Semifinals

6
- (Poland) M Fyrstenberg
- (Poland) M Matkowski
6
3
[4]

- (Brazil) T Bellucci
- (Brazil) M Melo
3
7^{7}
[2]

- (Ukraine) S Stakhovsky
- (Russia) M Youzhny
4
6
[10]

- (Ukraine) S Stakhovsky
- (Russia) M Youzhny
6
6^{3}
[10]

- (Ukraine) S Stakhovsky
- (Russia) M Youzhny
6
4
[3]

- (Sweden) R Lindstedt
- (Romania) H Tecău
7
4
[11]

4
- (India) M Bhupathi
- (Belarus) M Mirnyi
4
6
[10]

- (Spain) D Ferrer
- (Spain) F López
5
6
[9]

- (Sweden) R Lindstedt
- (Romania) H Tecău
3
5

4
- (India) M Bhupathi
- (Belarus) M Mirnyi
6
7

4
- (India) M Bhupathi
- (Belarus) M Mirnyi
6
3
[4]

2
- (United States) B Bryan
- (United States) M Bryan
4
6
[10]

7
- (Austria) O Marach
- (Belgium) D Norman
4
7
[8]

- (United Kingdom) R Hutchins
- (United Kingdom) A Murray
3
2

- (Germany) P Kohlschreiber
- (France) G Monfils
6
5
[10]

- (Germany) P Kohlschreiber
- (France) G Monfils
6
6

- (Germany) P Kohlschreiber
- (France) G Monfils
6^{2}
2

- (Sweden) S Aspelin
- (Australia) P Hanley
7
7^{7}

2
- (United States) B Bryan
- (United States) M Bryan
7^{7}
6

WC
- (Canada) F Dancevic
- (Canada) A Shamasdin
5
6^{3}

- (Sweden) S Aspelin
- (Australia) P Hanley
3
4

2
- (United States) B Bryan
- (United States) M Bryan
6
6
