= 2007 Gaz de France Budapest Grand Prix =

- Date: 21–29 April
- Edition: 12th
- Category: Tier III
- Draw: 32S / 16D
- Prize money: $175,000
- Surface: Clay / outdoor
- Location: Budapest, Hungary

Champions

Singles
- (Argentina) Gisela Dulko

Doubles
- (Hungary) Ágnes Szávay (Czech Republic) Vladimíra Uhlířová
- Hungarian Ladies Open

The 2007 Gaz de France Budapest Grand Prix was a WTA Tour women's tennis event held on outdoor clay courts in Budapest, Hungary from 21 April until 29 April 2007. It was the 12th edition of the tournament.

The singles title was won by sixth-seeded Gisela Dulko. Both Dulko and Cîrstea were playing in their first final on the WTA Tour, with Dulko coming through in three sets.

== Finals ==
=== Singles ===
(Argentina) Gisela Dulko defeated (Romania) Sorana Cîrstea 6–7^{(2–7)}, 6–2, 6–2

- It was Dulko's first singles title of her career.

=== Doubles ===
(Hungary) Ágnes Szávay / (Czech Republic) Vladimíra Uhlířová defeated (Germany) Martina Müller / (Czech Republic) Gabriela Navrátilová 7–5, 6–2
