= 2021 Chicago Women's Open =

Women's tennis tournament

- Date: 22–28 August
- Edition: 1st
- Category: WTA 250
- Draw: 32S / 16Q / 16D
- Prize money: $235,238
- Surface: Hard
- Location: Chicago, Illinois, U.S.
- Venue: XS Tennis Village

Champions

Singles
- (Ukraine) Elina Svitolina

Doubles
- (Ukraine) Nadiia Kichenok / (Romania) Raluca Olaru
Chicago Women's Open

The 2021 Chicago Women's Open was a tennis tournament held in Chicago, Illinois for female professional tennis players, and part of the 2021 WTA Tour. It was played on outdoor hard courts in the week prior to the 2021 U.S. Open. This marked the first time since 1997 that a WTA tournament was held in Chicago.

== Champions ==
=== Singles ===
- (Ukraine) Elina Svitolina def. (France) Alizé Cornet, 7–5, 6–4.

This was Svitolina's sixteenth WTA Tour singles title, and first of the year.

=== Doubles ===
- (Ukraine) Nadiia Kichenok / (Romania) Raluca Olaru def. (Ukraine) Lyudmyla Kichenok / (Japan) Makoto Ninomiya, 7–6^{(8–6)}, 5–7, [10–8].

== Singles main draw entrants ==
=== Seeds ===
Country	Player	Rank^{1}	Seed
UKR	Elina Svitolina	6	1
~~ITA~~	~~Camila Giorgi~~	~~33~~	~~2~~
ROU	Sorana Cîrstea	38	3
SLO	Tamara Zidanšek	40	4
CZE	Markéta Vondroušová	41	5
SUI	Viktorija Golubic	47	6
FRA	Kristina Mladenovic	54	7
UKR	Marta Kostyuk	56	8
FRA	Alizé Cornet	57	9

- Rankings are as of August 16, 2021.

=== Other entrants ===
The following players received wildcards into the main draw:

- (Canada) Françoise Abanda
- (Canada) Katherine Sebov
- (Ukraine) Elina Svitolina
- (United States) Venus Williams

The following players received entry from the qualifying draw:

- (Romania) Ana Bogdan
- (Kazakhstan) Zarina Diyas
- (United States) Quinn Gleason
- (Indonesia) Aldila Sutjiadi

The following player received entry as a lucky loser:

- (France) Clara Burel

=== Withdrawals ===
Before the tournament

- (Italy) Camila Giorgi → replaced by (France) Clara Burel
- (Germany) Andrea Petkovic → replaced by (Russia) Varvara Gracheva
- (Kazakhstan) Elena Rybakina → replaced by (Japan) Misaki Doi
- (Australia) Ajla Tomljanović → replaced by (France) Fiona Ferro

== Doubles main draw entrants ==
=== Seeds ===
Country	Player	Country	Player	Rank^{1}	Seed
USA	Nicole Melichar	NED	Demi Schuurs	23	1
TPE	Chan Hao-ching	TPE	Latisha Chan	42	2
UKR	Nadiia Kichenok	ROU	Raluca Olaru	80	3
UKR	Lyudmyla Kichenok	JPN	Makoto Ninomiya	100	4

- Rankings are as of August 16, 2021.

=== Withdrawals ===
Before the tournament

- (Russia) Anastasia Potapova / (United Kingdom) Heather Watson → replaced by (Chile) Bárbara Gatica / (Brazil) Rebeca Pereira
