= 2008 Budapest Grand Prix – Doubles =

Doubles
- 2008 Budapest Grand Prix

Final
- Champions: (France) Alizé Cornet (Slovakia) Janette Husárová
- Runners-up: (Germany) Vanessa Henke (Romania) Raluca Olaru
- Score: 6–7^{(5–7)}, 6–1, [10–6]

Details
- Draw: 16
- Seeds: 4

Events
| Singles | Doubles |
| ← 2007 · | Budapest Grand Prix | · 2009 → |

Ágnes Szávay and Vladimíra Uhlířová were the defending champions, but chose not to participate.

Alizé Cornet and Janette Husárová won the tournament, defeating Vanessa Henke and Raluca Olaru in the final, 6–7^{(5–7)}, 6–1, [10–6].

== Seeds ==
1. (Belarus) Ekaterina Dzehalevich / (Poland) Klaudia Jans (first round)
2. (Switzerland) Timea Bacsinszky / (Poland) Alicja Rosolska (first round)
3. (France) Alizé Cornet / (Slovakia) Janette Husárová (champions)
4. (Russia) Maria Kondratieva / (France) Sophie Lefèvre (first round)

== Draw ==
=== Key ===
- Q = Qualifier
- WC = Wild card
- LL = Lucky loser
- Alt = Alternate
- ITF = ITF entry
- PR = Protected ranking
- SR = Special ranking
- SE = Special exempt
- JE = Junior exempt
- JR = Junior Accelerator Programme entrant
- CO = College Accelerator Programme entrant
- NG = Next Gen Accelerator Program entrant
- w/o = Walkover
- r = Retired
- d = Defaulted

First round
1 | (Belarus) E Dzehalevich (Poland) K Jans | 1 | 2
(Israel) T Obziler (Romania) A Szatmári | 6 | 6
(Slovenia) A Klepač (Australia) B Stewart | 7^{7} | 2 | [10]
(Slovakia) M Babáková (Russia) A Lapushchenkova | 6^{5} | 6 | [7]
3 | (France) A Cornet (Slovakia) J Husárová | 6 | 6
(Slovakia) K Kachlíková (Slovakia) Z Kučová | 1 | 1
WC | (Hungary) K Marosi (Brazil) M Tavares | 6 | 1 | [8]
(Bulgaria) D Evtimova (Slovakia) M Kochanová | 2 | 6 | [10]
(Romania) AX Tout (Serbia) N Zorić | 2 | 1
(Germany) A-L Grönefeld (Turkey) İ Şenoğlu | 6 | 6
(Ukraine) V Kapshay (Hungary) K Nagy | 6 | 4 | [10]
4 | (Russia) M Kondratieva (France) S Lefèvre | 4 | 6 | [8]
(Czech Republic) V Chvojková (Germany) M Müller | 1 | 3
(Finland) E Laine (Serbia) T Mirčić | 6 | 6
(Germany) V Henke (Romania) R Olaru | 7^{10} | 0 | [10]
2 | (Switzerland) T Bacsinszky (Poland) A Rosolska | 6^{8} | 6 | [7]

Quarterfinals
(Israel) T Obziler (Romania) A Szatmári | 4 | 4
(Slovenia) A Klepač (Australia) B Stewart | 6 | 6
3 | (France) A Cornet (Slovakia) J Husárová | 6 | 6
(Bulgaria) D Evtimova (Slovakia) M Kochanová | 4 | 1
(Germany) A-L Grönefeld (Turkey) İ Şenoğlu | 4 | 6 | [10]
(Ukraine) V Kapshay (Hungary) K Nagy | 6 | 1 | [12]
(Finland) E Laine (Serbia) T Mirčić | 2 | 4
(Germany) V Henke (Romania) R Olaru | 6 | 6

Semifinals
(Slovenia) A Klepač (Australia) B Stewart | 2 | 1
3 | (France) A Cornet (Slovakia) J Husárová | 6 | 6
(Ukraine) V Kapshay (Hungary) K Nagy | 3 | 2
(Germany) V Henke (Romania) R Olaru | 6 | 6

Final
3 | (France) A Cornet (Slovakia) J Husárová | 6^{5} | 6 | [10]
(Germany) V Henke (Romania) R Olaru | 7^{7} | 1 | [6]
