= 2021 Chicago Women's Open – Doubles =

Doubles
- 2021 Chicago Women's Open

Final
- Champions: (Ukraine) Nadiia Kichenok (Romania) Raluca Olaru
- Runners-up: (Ukraine) Lyudmyla Kichenok (Japan) Makoto Ninomiya
- Score: 7–6^{(8–6)}, 5–7, [10–8]

Events
Singles	Doubles
Chicago Women's Open

This was the first edition of the tennis tournament.

Nadiia Kichenok and Raluca Olaru won the title, defeating Lyudmyla Kichenok and Makoto Ninomiya in the final, 7–6^{(8–6)}, 5–7, [10–8].

== Seeds ==
1. (United States) Nicole Melichar / (Netherlands) Demi Schuurs (quarterfinals)
2. (Chinese Taipei) Chan Hao-ching / (Chinese Taipei) Latisha Chan (semifinals, withdrew)
3. (Ukraine) Nadiia Kichenok / (Romania) Raluca Olaru (champions)
4. (Ukraine) Lyudmyla Kichenok / (Japan) Makoto Ninomiya (final)

== Draw ==
=== Key ===
- Q = Qualifier
- WC = Wild card
- LL = Lucky loser
- Alt = Alternate
- SE = Special exempt
- PR = Protected ranking
- ITF = ITF entry
- JE = Junior exempt
- w/o = Walkover
- r = Retired
- d = Defaulted
- SR = Special ranking

=== Draw ===
First round
1	(United States) N Melichar (Netherlands) D Schuurs	6	7^{7}
(United States) K Christian (Japan) N Hibino	2	6^{5}
(Ukraine) M Kostyuk (Denmark) C Tauson	6^{3}	3
(Czech Republic) T Martincová (Czech Republic) M Vondroušová	7^{7}	6
3	(Ukraine) N Kichenok (Romania) R Olaru	6	6
(Switzerland) V Golubic (Slovenia) T Zidanšek	2	4
(Indonesia) B Gumulya (United Kingdom) E Webley-Smith	0	1
(Chinese Taipei) Y-c Hsieh (Thailand) P Plipuech	6	6
(Japan) E Hozumi (Poland) A Rosolska	6	6
(United States) Q Gleason (United Kingdom) E Silva	3	2
(New Zealand) E Routliffe (Indonesia) A Sutjiadi	3	6	[9]
4	(Ukraine) L Kichenok (Japan) M Ninomiya	6	4	[11]
(Netherlands) R van der Hoek (Belgium) K Zimmermann	5	4
(United States) H Baptiste (United States) C Liu	7	6
(Chile) B Gatica (Brazil) R Pereira	3	0
2	(Chinese Taipei) H-c Chan (Chinese Taipei) L Chan	6	6

Quarterfinals
1	(United States) N Melichar (Netherlands) D Schuurs	6	4	[9]
(Czech Republic) T Martincová (Czech Republic) M Vondroušová	1	6	[11]
3	(Ukraine) N Kichenok (Romania) R Olaru	7^{7}	6
(Chinese Taipei) Y-c Hsieh (Thailand) P Plipuech	6^{1}	3
(Japan) E Hozumi (Poland) A Rosolska	6^{5}	3
4	(Ukraine) L Kichenok (Japan) M Ninomiya	7^{7}	6
(United States) H Baptiste (United States) C Liu
2	(Chinese Taipei) H-c Chan (Chinese Taipei) L Chan	w/o

Semifinals
(Czech Republic) T Martincová (Czech Republic) M Vondroušová
3	(Ukraine) N Kichenok (Romania) R Olaru	w/o
4	(Ukraine) L Kichenok (Japan) M Ninomiya	w/o
2	(Chinese Taipei) H-c Chan (Chinese Taipei) L Chan

Final
3	(Ukraine) N Kichenok (Romania) R Olaru	7^{8}	5	[10]
4	(Ukraine) L Kichenok (Japan) M Ninomiya	6^{6}	7	[8]
