= Chicago Women's Open =

Tennis tournament in Illinois, US

Defunct tennis tournament
- Founded: 2021
- Abolished: 2021
- Location: Chicago; United States
- Venue: XS Tennis Village
- Category: WTA 250
- Surface: Hard
- Draw: 32S / 16Q / 16D
- Prize money: $235,238
- Website: Chicago Women's Open

Current champions (2021)
- Women's singles: (Ukraine) Elina Svitolina
- Women's doubles: (Ukraine) Nadiia Kichenok (Romania) Raluca Olaru

The Chicago Women's Open was a tennis tournament held in Chicago, Illinois, for female professional tennis players, whose first edition was part of the 2021 WTA Tour. It is held on outdoor hard courts one week prior to the US Open.

== Results ==
=== Singles ===
Year	Champion	Runner-up	Score
2021	(Ukraine) Elina Svitolina	(France) Alizé Cornet	7–5, 6–4

=== Doubles ===
Year	Champions	Runners-up	Score
2021	(Ukraine) Nadiia Kichenok (Romania) Raluca Olaru	(Ukraine) Lyudmyla Kichenok (Japan) Makoto Ninomiya	7–6^{(8–6)}, 5–7, [10–8]
