= 2008 Budapest Grand Prix – Singles =

Singles
- 2008 Budapest Grand Prix

Final
- Champion: (France) Alizé Cornet
- Runner-up: (Slovenia) Andreja Klepač
- Score: 7–6^{(7–5)}, 6–3

Details
- Draw: 30
- Seeds: 8

Events
Singles	Doubles
- Budapest Grand Prix

Gisela Dulko was the defending champion, but chose not to participate that year.

Second-seeded Alizé Cornet won in the final 7–6^{(7–5)}, 6–3, against Andreja Klepač.

== Seeds ==
The top two seeds receive a bye into the second round.

1. (Hungary) Ágnes Szávay (second round)
2. (France) Alizé Cornet (champion)
3. (Bulgaria) Tsvetana Pironkova (second round)
4. (Czech Republic) Iveta Benešová (first round)
5. (Czech Republic) Lucie Šafářová (second round)
6. (France) Pauline Parmentier (first round)
7. (Czech Republic) Klára Zakopalová (quarterfinals)
8. (Romania) Sorana Cîrstea (first round)

== Draw ==
Key

- Q = Qualifier
- WC = Wild card
- LL = Lucky loser
- Alt = Alternate
- ITF = ITF entry
- PR = Protected ranking
- SR = Special ranking
- SE = Special exempt
- JE = Junior exempt
- JR = Junior Accelerator Programme entrant
- CO = College Accelerator Programme entrant
- NG = Next Gen Accelerator Program entrant
- w/o = Walkover
- r = Retired
- d = Defaulted

=== Finals ===
Semifinals
(Slovenia) Andreja Klepač	6	4	6
(Croatia) Karolina Šprem	2	6	4
(Hungary) Gréta Arn	1	1
2	(France) Alizé Cornet	6	6

Final
(Slovenia) Andreja Klepač	6^{5}	3
2	(France) Alizé Cornet	7	6

=== Top half ===
First round
(Slovenia) A Klepač	6	6
Q	(Serbia) N Zorić	4	4
Q	(Czech Republic) V Chvojková	6	4	1
(Germany) M Müller	3	6	6
(Czech Republic) P Kvitová	6	6
8	(Romania) S Cîrstea	2	4
3	(Bulgaria) T Pironkova	6	6
WC	(Serbia) T Mirčić	3	1
(Russia) A Lapushchenkova	3	1
WC	(Hungary) K Marosi	6	6
(Israel) T Obziler	6	6
(Romania) IR Olaru	3	2
(Croatia) K Šprem	7	6
6	(France) P Parmentier	5	2

Second round
1	(Hungary) Á Szávay	2	3
(Slovenia) A Klepač	6	6
(Germany) M Müller	2	1
(Czech Republic) P Kvitová	6	6
3	(Bulgaria) T Pironkova	2	6^{2}
WC	(Hungary) K Marosi	6	7
(Israel) T Obziler	2	1
(Croatia) K Šprem	6	6

Quarterfinals
(Slovenia) A Klepač	7	6
(Czech Republic) P Kvitová	6^{2}	0
WC	(Hungary) K Marosi	0	1
(Croatia) K Šprem	6	6

Semifinals
(Slovenia) A Klepač	6	4	6
(Croatia) K Šprem	2	6	4

=== Bottom half ===
First round
7	(Czech Republic) K Zakopalová	6	6
(France) S Cohen-Aloro	3	2
Q	(Czech Republic) L Hradecká	6	4	6^{6}
(France) M Johansson	4	6	7
Q	(Slovakia) Z Kučová	6	6
(Switzerland) T Bacsinszky	3	4
(Hungary) G Arn	6	6
4	(Czech Republic) I Benešová	4	4
5	(Czech Republic) L Šafářová	6	6
(Hungary) K Nagy	2	2
(Germany) A-L Grönefeld	6	6
WC	(Hungary) P Kiraly	0	4
(Ukraine) V Kutuzova	2	1
(Slovakia) M Rybáriková	6	6

Second round
7	(Czech Republic) K Zakopalová	6	6
(France) M Johansson	0	1
Q	(Slovakia) Z Kučová	2	1
(Hungary) G Arn	6	6
5	(Czech Republic) L Šafářová	1	4
(Germany) A-L Grönefeld	6	6
(Slovakia) M Rybáriková	2	2
2	(France) A Cornet	6	6

Quarterfinals
7	(Czech Republic) K Zakopalová	1	0
(Hungary) G Arn	6	6
(Germany) A-L Grönefeld	2	3
2	(France) A Cornet	6	6

Semifinals
(Hungary) G Arn	1	1
2	(France) A Cornet	6	6
