= 2010 Rogers Cup – Women's doubles =

Women's doubles
- 2010 Rogers Cup

Final
- Champions: (Argentina) Gisela Dulko; (Italy) Flavia Pennetta
- Runners-up: (Czech Republic) Květa Peschke; (Slovenia) Katarina Srebotnik
- Score: 7–5, 3–6, [12–10]

Details
- Draw: 28
- Seeds: 8

Events
Singles	men	women
Doubles	men	women
- Rogers Cup

Nuria Llagostera Vives and María José Martínez Sánchez were the defending champions, but Martínez Sánchez decided to not start this year, due to injury.
Llagostera Vives partnered with Arantxa Parra Santonja but lost in the first round 6–2, 6–0 against Elena Vesnina and Vera Zvonareva.
Gisela Dulko and Flavia Pennetta won in the final against Květa Peschke and Katarina Srebotnik, 7–5, 3–6, [12–10].

== Seeds ==
The top four seeds receive a bye into the second round.

1. (United States) Liezel Huber / (Russia) Nadia Petrova (second round)
2. (Argentina) Gisela Dulko / (Italy) Flavia Pennetta (champions)
3. (Czech Republic) Květa Peschke / (Slovenia) Katarina Srebotnik (finals)
4. (United States) Vania King / (Kazakhstan) Yaroslava Shvedova (second round)
5. (Russia) Alisa Kleybanova / (Russia) Ekaterina Makarova (first round)
6. (Chinese Taipei) Chan Yung-jan / (China) Zheng Jie (quarterfinals)
7. (Zimbabwe) Cara Black / (Australia) Anastasia Rodionova (second round)
8. (Russia) Maria Kirilenko / (Poland) Agnieszka Radwańska (second round)

== Draw ==
Key

- Q = Qualifier
- WC = Wild card
- LL = Lucky loser
- Alt = Alternate
- ITF = ITF entry
- PR = Protected ranking
- SR = Special ranking
- SE = Special exempt
- JE = Junior exempt
- JR = Junior Accelerator Programme entrant
- CO = College Accelerator Programme entrant
- NG = Next Gen Accelerator Program entrant
- w/o = Walkover
- r = Retired
- d = Defaulted

=== Finals ===
Semifinals

Final

- (Spain) Anabel Medina Garrigues
- (China) Yan Zi
5
6
[6]

3
- (Czech Republic) Květa Peschke
- (Slovenia) Katarina Srebotnik
7
1
[10]

3
- (Czech Republic) Květa Peschke
- (Slovenia) Katarina Srebotnik
5
6
[10]

2
- (Argentina) Gisela Dulko
- (Italy) Flavia Pennetta
7
3
[12]

- (Romania) Monica Niculescu
- (Israel) Shahar Pe'er
2
6
[4]

2
- (Argentina) Gisela Dulko
- (Italy) Flavia Pennetta
6
3
[10]

=== Top half ===
First round

Second round

Quarterfinals

Semifinals

1
- (United States) L Huber
- (Russia) N Petrova
6
6
[9]

(Czech Republic) I Benešová
(Czech Republic) B Záhlavová Strýcová
6
6

(Czech Republic) I Benešová
(Czech Republic) B Záhlavová Strýcová
7
1
[11]

- (Chinese Taipei) S-w Hsieh
- (Russia) A Kudryavtseva
1
3

(Czech Republic) I Benešová
(Czech Republic) B Záhlavová Strýcová
6
3
[5]

- (Czech Republic) A Hlaváčková
- (Czech Republic) L Hradecká
7
6

- (Spain) A Medina Garrigues
- (China) Z Yan
3
6
[10]

- (Russia) M Kondratieva
- (Czech Republic) V Uhlířová
5
2

- (Czech Republic) A Hlaváčková
- (Czech Republic) L Hradecká
1
4

- (Spain) A Medina Garrigues
- (China) Z Yan
4
7
[10]

- (Spain) A Medina Garrigues
- (China) Z Yan
6
6

5
- (Russia) A Kleybanova
- (Russia) E Makarova
6
6^{4}
[8]

(Spain) A Medina Garrigues
(China) Z Yan
5
6
[6]

3
- (Czech Republic) K Peschke
- (Slovenia) K Srebotnik
7
1
[10]

3
- (Czech Republic) K Peschke
- (Slovenia) K Srebotnik
6
2
[10]

WC
- (Canada) S Fichman
- (Canada) M-È Pelletier
3
5

WC
- (Slovakia) D Hantuchová
- (Denmark) C Wozniacki
4
6
[3]

WC
- (Slovakia) D Hantuchová
- (Denmark) C Wozniacki
6
7

3
- (Czech Republic) K Peschke
- (Slovenia) K Srebotnik
6
6

- (Ukraine) K Bondarenko
- (Italy) F Schiavone
3
3

- (Italy) S Errani
- (Italy) R Vinci
2
3

- (Italy) S Errani
- (Italy) R Vinci
6
6

- (Italy) S Errani
- (Italy) R Vinci
6
4
[10]

- (United States) B Mattek-Sands
- (United States) M Shaughnessy
5
7
[8]

7
- (Zimbabwe) C Black
- (Australia) A Rodionova
4
6
[7]

7
- (Zimbabwe) C Black
- (Australia) A Rodionova
7
6^{5}
[10]

=== Bottom half ===
First round

Second round

Quarterfinals

Semifinals

6
- (Chinese Taipei) Y-j Chan
- (China) J Zheng
6
6

WC
- (Canada) H El Tabakh
- (Canada) R Marino
2
1

6
- (Chinese Taipei) Y-j Chan
- (China) J Zheng
6
6

- (Switzerland) T Bacsinszky
- (Italy) T Garbin
6
3
[10]

- (Switzerland) T Bacsinszky
- (Italy) T Garbin
2
4

- (New Zealand) M Erakovic
- (Poland) K Jans
4
6
[2]

6
- (Chinese Taipei) Y-j Chan
- (China) J Zheng
6
4
[9]

- (Chinese Taipei) C-j Chuang
- (Belarus) O Govortsova
1
4

- (Romania) M Niculescu
- (Israel) S Pe'er
4
6
[11]

- (Romania) M Niculescu
- (Israel) S Pe'er
6
6

- (Romania) M Niculescu
- (Israel) S Pe'er
0
7
[10]

4
- (United States) V King
- (Kazakhstan) Y Shvedova
6
5
[7]

- (Romania) M Niculescu
- (Israel) S Pe'er
2
6
[4]

8
- (Russia) M Kirilenko
- (Poland) A Radwańska
6
7

2
- (Argentina) G Dulko
- (Italy) F Pennetta
6
3
[10]

(Germany) A-L Grönefeld
(Turkey) İ Şenoğlu
0
6^{4}

8
- (Russia) M Kirilenko
- (Poland) A Radwańska
5
4

- (Spain) N Llagostera Vives
- (Spain) A Parra Santonja
2
0

- (Russia) E Vesnina
- (Russia) V Zvonareva
7
6

- (Russia) E Vesnina
- (Russia) V Zvonareva
6
6

- (Russia) E Vesnina
- (Russia) V Zvonareva
4
1

- (France) J Coin
- (Poland) A Rosolska
6
4
[10]

2
- (Argentina) G Dulko
- (Italy) F Pennetta
6
6

- (Uzbekistan) A Amanmuradova
- (Russia) V Dushevina
4
6
[7]

- (France) J Coin
- (Poland) A Rosolska
1
6
[8]

2
- (Argentina) G Dulko
- (Italy) F Pennetta
6
2
[10]
