= 2007 Gaz de France Budapest Grand Prix – Doubles =

Doubles
- 2007 GDF Suez Grand Prix

Final
- Champion: (Hungary) Ágnes Szávay (Czech Republic) Vladimíra Uhlířová
- Runner-up: (Germany) Martina Müller (Czech Republic) Gabriela Navrátilová
- Score: 7-5, 6-2

Events
Singles	Doubles
- Hungarian Ladies Open

Following are the results of the 2007 GDF Suez Grand Prix doubles tennis competition. The 2007 Gaz de France Budapest Grand Prix was a WTA Tour tennis event held on April 21–29, 2007, won by Gisela Dulko.

Janette Husárová and Michaëlla Krajicek were the defending champions, but both chose not to participate that year.

== Seeds ==
1. (Russia) Maria Kirilenko
  (Russia) Elena Likhovtseva (semifinals)
2. (Greece) Eleni Daniilidou
  (Germany) Jasmin Wöhr (semifinals)
3. (Czech Republic) Lucie Hradecká
  (Czech Republic) Renata Voráčová (first round)
4. (Hungary) Ágnes Szávay
  (Czech Republic) Vladimíra Uhlířová (champions)

== Draw ==
Key

- Q = Qualifier
- WC = Wild card
- LL = Lucky loser
- Alt = Alternate
- ITF = ITF entry
- PR = Protected ranking
- SR = Special ranking
- SE = Special exempt
- JE = Junior exempt
- JR = Junior Accelerator Programme entrant
- CO = College Accelerator Programme entrant
- NG = Next Gen Accelerator Program entrant
- w/o = Walkover
- r = Retired
- d = Defaulted

=== Draw ===
First round
1	(Russia) M Kirilenko (Russia) E Likhovtseva	6	6
(Slovenia) A Klepač (Croatia) N Ožegović	2	3
(Hungary) Z Gubacsi (Hungary) K Nagy	4	4
(Ukraine) V Kapshay (Ukraine) M Koryttseva	6	6
3	(Czech Republic) L Hradecká (Czech Republic) R Voráčová	7	4	[7]
(Poland) K Jans (Poland) A Rosolska	5	6	[10]
(Germany) M Müller (Czech Republic) G Navrátilová	6	6
WC	(Hungary) K Halasz (Hungary) J Nagy	2	1
(Romania) S Cîrstea (Slovakia) L Tvarošková	6	3	[7]
(Ukraine) O Savchuk (Romania) Á Szatmári	4	6	[10]
Alt.	(Hungary) H Habler (Hungary) D Kiss	0	2
4	(Hungary) Á Szávay (Czech Republic) V Uhlířová	6	6
(Latvia) L Dekmeijere (Czech Republic) H Šromová	w/o
(Italy) ME Camerin (Italy) K Knapp
(Ukraine) Y Beygelzimer (Belarus) T Poutchek	2	2
2	(Greece) E Daniilidou (Germany) J Wöhr	6	6

Quarterfinals
1	(Russia) M Kirilenko (Russia) E Likhovtseva	6	5	[10]
(Ukraine) V Kapshay (Ukraine) M Koryttseva	4	7	[6]
(Poland) K Jans (Poland) A Rosolska	4	3
(Germany) M Müller (Czech Republic) G Navrátilová	6	6
(Ukraine) O Savchuk (Romania) Á Szatmári	4	7	[3]
4	(Hungary) Á Szávay (Czech Republic) V Uhlířová	6	5	[10]
(Latvia) L Dekmeijere (Czech Republic) H Šromová	4	3
2	(Greece) E Daniilidou (Germany) J Wöhr	6	6

Semifinals
1	(Russia) M Kirilenko (Russia) E Likhovtseva
(Germany) M Müller (Czech Republic) G Navrátilová	w/o
4	(Hungary) Á Szávay (Czech Republic) V Uhlířová	w/o
2	(Greece) E Daniilidou (Germany) J Wöhr

Finals
(Germany) M Müller (Czech Republic) G Navrátilová	5	2
4	(Hungary) Á Szávay (Czech Republic) V Uhlířová	7	6
