= 2021 Chicago Women's Open – Singles =

Singles
- 2021 Chicago Women's Open

Final
- Champion: (Ukraine) Elina Svitolina
- Runner-up: (France) Alizé Cornet
- Score: 7–5, 6–4

Details
- Draw: 32 (4Q / 4WC)
- Seeds: 8

Events
Singles	Doubles
Chicago Women's Open

This was the first edition of the tournament.

Elina Svitolina won the title, defeating Alizé Cornet in the final, 7–5, 6–4.

== Seeds ==
1. (Ukraine) Elina Svitolina (champion)
2. (Italy) Camila Giorgi (withdrew)
3. (Romania) Sorana Cîrstea (first round)
4. (Slovenia) Tamara Zidanšek (first round)
5. (Czech Republic) Markéta Vondroušová (quarterfinals)
6. (Switzerland) Viktorija Golubic (second round)
7. (France) Kristina Mladenovic (quarterfinals)
8. (Ukraine) Marta Kostyuk (quarterfinals)
9. (France) Alizé Cornet (final)

== Draw ==
=== Key ===
- Q = Qualifier
- WC = Wild card
- LL = Lucky loser
- Alt = Alternate
- SE = Special exempt
- PR = Protected ranking
- ITF = ITF entry
- JE = Junior exempt
- w/o = Walkover
- r = Retired
- d = Defaulted
- SR = Special ranking

=== Finals ===
Semifinals
1/WC	(Ukraine) Elina Svitolina	6	6^{4}	6
(Sweden) Rebecca Peterson	1	7^{7}	3
(Russia) Varvara Gracheva	6	1	0
9	(France) Alizé Cornet	4	6	6

Final
1/WC	(Ukraine) Elina Svitolina	7	6
9	(France) Alizé Cornet	5	4

=== Top half ===
First round
1/WC	(Ukraine) E Svitolina	5	6	2
LL	(France) C Burel	7	1	0^{r}
(France) F Ferro	4	7	6
Q	(Indonesia) A Sutjiadi	6	5	1
(Montenegro) D Kovinić	4	2
WC	(Canada) F Abanda	6	6
Q	(Kazakhstan) Z Diyas	2	6^{3}
7	(France) K Mladenovic	6	7^{7}
3	(Romania) S Cîrstea	6	3	2
(Czech Republic) T Martincová	3	6	6
WC	(United States) V Williams	2	3
(Chinese Taipei) S-w Hsieh	6	6
(Sweden) R Peterson	7^{11}	7^{8}
(Czech Republic) M Bouzková	6^{9}	6^{6}
(Colombia) C Osorio	6^{5}	3
6	(Switzerland) V Golubic	7^{7}	6

Second round
1/WC	(Ukraine) E Svitolina	6	6
(France) F Ferro	4	4
WC	(Canada) F Abanda	3	2
7	(France) K Mladenovic	6	6
(Czech Republic) T Martincová	3	6	6
(Chinese Taipei) S-w Hsieh	6	4	2
(Sweden) R Peterson	7^{7}	6
6	(Switzerland) V Golubic	6^{5}	3

Quarterfinals
1/WC	(Ukraine) E Svitolina	6	6
7	(France) K Mladenovic	1	0
(Czech Republic) T Martincová	7^{7}	2	1^{r}
(Sweden) R Peterson	6^{4}	6	4

Semifinals
1/WC	(Ukraine) E Svitolina	6	6^{4}	6
(Sweden) R Peterson	1	7^{7}	3

=== Bottom half ===
First round
8	(Ukraine) M Kostyuk	6	6
WC	(Canada) K Sebov	0	3
(Estonia) K Kanepi	3	6	7
(Ukraine) A Kalinina	6	2	5
Q	(Romania) A Bogdan	6	1
(United Kingdom) H Watson	2	0^{r}
(Russia) V Gracheva	6	1	6
4	(Slovenia) T Zidanšek	3	6	2
5	(Czech Republic) M Vondroušová	6	6
Q	(United States) Q Gleason	2	0
(Japan) N Hibino	1	3
(Belgium) A Van Uytvanck	6	6
(Japan) M Doi	4	2
(Italy) J Paolini	6	6
(United States) A Li	7^{10}	0	4
9	(France) A Cornet	6^{8}	6	6

Second round
8	(Ukraine) M Kostyuk	6	6
(Estonia) K Kanepi	2	3
Q	(Romania) A Bogdan	5	1^{r}
(Russia) V Gracheva	7	3
5	(Czech Republic) M Vondroušová	6	1
(Belgium) A Van Uytvanck	1	0^{r}
(Italy) J Paolini	6^{4}	4
9	(France) A Cornet	7^{7}	6

Quarterfinals
8	(Ukraine) M Kostyuk	7^{7}	3	4
(Russia) V Gracheva	6^{4}	6	6
5	(Czech Republic) M Vondroušová	6	4	3
9	(France) A Cornet	2	6	6

Semifinals
(Russia) V Gracheva	6	1	0
9	(France) A Cornet	4	6	6

== Qualifying ==
=== Seeds ===
1. (Russia) Anastasia Potapova (first round)
2. (France) Clara Burel (qualifying competition, lucky loser)
3. (Romania) Ana Bogdan (qualified)
4. (Kazakhstan) Zarina Diyas (qualified)
5. (Italy) Sara Errani (withdrew)
6. (United States) Hailey Baptiste (first round)
7. (Australia) Samantha Stosur (withdrew, still playing in Cincinnati)
8. (South Korea) Han Na-lae (qualifying competition)

=== Qualifiers ===
1. (United States) Quinn Gleason
2. (Indonesia) Aldila Sutjiadi
3. (Romania) Ana Bogdan
4. (Kazakhstan) Zarina Diyas

=== Lucky loser ===
1. (France) Clara Burel

=== Qualifying draw ===
==== First qualifier ====
First round
1	(Russia) Anastasia Potapova	1	6	3
(United States) Quinn Gleason	6	2	6
WC	(United States) Maya Battle	0	0
Alt	(Japan) Makoto Ninomiya	6	6

Qualifying competition
(United States) Quinn Gleason	6	6
Alt	(Japan) Makoto Ninomiya	3	1

==== Second qualifier ====
First round
2	(France) Clara Burel	6	4	7
(Chile) Bárbara Gatica	2	6	5
(Indonesia) Aldila Sutjiadi	4	6	7
Alt	(Ukraine) Lyudmyla Kichenok	6	4	5

Qualifying competition
2	(France) Clara Burel	6	5	2
(Indonesia) Aldila Sutjiadi	2	7	6

==== Third qualifier ====
First round
3	(Romania) Ana Bogdan	6	5	6
WC	(United States) Emma Navarro	2	7	3
(Belgium) Kimberley Zimmermann	6	6
6	(United States) Hailey Baptiste	2	4

Qualifying competition
3	(Romania) Ana Bogdan	6	6
(Belgium) Kimberley Zimmermann	1	2

==== Fourth qualifier ====
First round
4	(Kazakhstan) Zarina Diyas	6	6
(United Kingdom) Eden Silva	0	1
(United States) Sophia Whittle	1	1
8	(South Korea) Han Na-lae	6	6

Qualifying competition
4	(Kazakhstan) Zarina Diyas	5	6	6
8	(South Korea) Han Na-lae	7	1	1
