= 2007 Gaz de France Budapest Grand Prix – Singles =

Singles
- 2007 GDF Suez Grand Prix

Final
- Champion: (Argentina) Gisela Dulko
- Runner-up: (Romania) Sorana Cîrstea
- Score: 6–7^{(2–7)}, 6–2, 6–2

Details
- Draw: 32
- Seeds: 8

Events
Singles	Doubles
- Hungarian Ladies Open

Gisela Dulko won her first WTA Tour singles title, defeating Sorana Cîrstea in the final, 6–7^{(2–7)}, 6–2, 6–2 to capture the Women's Singles tennis championship at the 2007 Hungarian Ladies Open.

Anna Smashnova was the two-time defending champion, but she chose not to compete this year.

== Seeds ==
1. (Italy) Tathiana Garbin (second round)
2. (Germany) Martina Müller (second round)
3. (Russia) Maria Kirilenko (first round)
4. (France) Émilie Loit (quarterfinals)
5. (Greece) Eleni Daniilidou (quarterfinals)
6. (Argentina) Gisela Dulko (champion)
7. (Russia) Elena Likhovtseva (first round)
8. (Italy) Romina Oprandi (first round)

== Draw ==
Key

- Q = Qualifier
- WC = Wild card
- LL = Lucky loser
- Alt = Alternate
- ITF = ITF entry
- PR = Protected ranking
- SR = Special ranking
- SE = Special exempt
- JE = Junior exempt
- JR = Junior Accelerator Programme entrant
- CO = College Accelerator Programme entrant
- NG = Next Gen Accelerator Program entrant
- w/o = Walkover
- r = Retired
- d = Defaulted

=== Finals ===
Semifinals
6	(Argentina) Gisela Dulko	6	6
WC	(Hungary) Ágnes Szávay	2	1
(Italy) Karin Knapp	6	4	3
Q	(Romania) Sorana Cîrstea	3	6	6

Finals
6	(Argentina) Gisela Dulko	6^{2}	6	6
Q	(Romania) Sorana Cîrstea	7^{7}	2	2

=== Section 1 ===
First round
1	(Italy) T Garbin	3	6	6
(Spain) N Llagostera Vives	6	4	2
Q	(Czech Republic) L Hradecká	0	3
LL	(Ukraine) O Savchuk	6	6
(Slovakia) M Suchá	6^{5}	6	6
(Czech Republic) H Šromová	7^{7}	4	4
(Bulgaria) T Pironkova	2	2
6	(Argentina) G Dulko	6	6
4	(France) É Loit	6	6
(Czech Republic) R Voráčová	4	2
(Hungary) M Czink	2	4
Q	(Slovenia) A Klepač	6	6
(Belarus) T Poutchek	6^{4}	4
(Ukraine) Y Beygelzimer	7^{7}	6
WC	(Hungary) Á Szávay	6	6
7	(Russia) E Likhovtseva	4	1

Second round
(Italy) T Garbin
LL	(Ukraine) O Savchuk	w/o
(Slovakia) M Suchá	6	2	4
6	(Argentina) G Dulko	3	6	6
4	(France) É Loit	7	7
Q	(Slovenia) A Klepač	5	5
(Ukraine) Y Beygelzimer	3	2
WC	(Hungary) Á Szávay	6	6

Quarterfinals
LL	(Ukraine) O Savchuk	3	4
6	(Argentina) G Dulko	6	6
4	(France) É Loit
WC	(Hungary) Á Szávay	w/o

Semifinals
6	(Argentina) G Dulko	6	6
WC	(Hungary) Á Szávay	2	1

=== Section 2 ===
First round
8	(Italy) R Oprandi	7	2	4^{r}
(Italy) K Knapp	5	6	3
WC	(Hungary) Z Gubacsi	6^{4}	1
(Croatia) K Šprem	7^{7}	6
WC	(Hungary) L Batta	2	3
(Italy) A Brianti	6	6
(Luxembourg) A Kremer	6	6
3	(Russia) M Kirilenko	3	4
5	(Greece) E Daniilidou	6	4	7
Q	(Germany) G Arn	1	6	5
(Germany) K Barrois	7^{8}	5	7^{7}
(Czech Republic) I Benešová	6^{6}	7	6^{5}
(Hungary) K Nagy	6^{2}	6	3
Q	(Romania) S Cîrstea	7^{7}	3	6
(Italy) ME Camerin	7^{9}	3	5
2	(Germany) M Müller	6^{7}	6	7

Second round
(Italy) K Knapp	4	6	6
(Croatia) K Šprem	6	2	4
(Italy) A Brianti	4	1
(Luxembourg) A Kremer	6	6
5	(Greece) E Daniilidou	6	6
(Germany) K Barrois	4	2
Q	(Romania) S Cîrstea	3	6	6
2	(Germany) M Müller	6	2	2

Quarterfinals
(Italy) K Knapp	6	6
(Luxembourg) A Kremer	2	1
5	(Greece) E Daniilidou	6	1	4
Q	(Romania) S Cîrstea	2	6	6

Semifinals
(Italy) K Knapp	6	4	3
Q	(Romania) S Cîrstea	3	6	6

== Qualifying ==
=== Seeds ===
1. (Ukraine) Olga Savchuk (qualifying competition, lucky loser)
2. (Slovenia) Andreja Klepač (qualified)
3. (Germany) Gréta Arn (qualified)
4. (Poland) Joanna Sakowicz (qualifying competition)
5. (Germany) Julia Görges (first round)
6. (Romania) Magda Mihalache (second round)
7. (Croatia) Nika Ožegović (qualifying competition)
8. (Czech Republic) Lucie Hradecká (qualified)

=== Qualifiers ===
1. (Romania) Sorana Cîrstea
2. (Slovenia) Andreja Klepač
3. (Germany) Gréta Arn
4. (Czech Republic) Lucie Hradecká

=== Lucky loser ===
1. (Ukraine) Olga Savchuk

=== First qualifier ===
Third round
1	(Ukraine) Olga Savchuk	6	6
(Russia) Angelina Gabueva	2	1
WC	(Hungary) Dóra Kiss	0	3
(Czech Republic) Veronika Chvojková	6	6
(Romania) Sorana Cîrstea	6	6
WC	(Hungary) Palma Kiraly	0	4
(Belgium) Debbrich Feys	2	4
6	(Romania) Magda Mihalache	6	6

Second round
1	(Ukraine) Olga Savchuk	6	6
(Czech Republic) Veronika Chvojková	0	3
(Romania) Sorana Cîrstea	6	6
6	(Romania) Magda Mihalache	4	3

Qualifying
1	(Ukraine) Olga Savchuk	5	0
(Romania) Sorana Cîrstea	7	6

=== Second qualifier ===
First round
2	(Slovenia) Andreja Klepač	6	6
(United States) Brie Whitehead	0	0
(Ukraine) Galyna Kosyk	3	0
(Slovakia) Lenka Tvarošková	6	6
(Russia) Evgenia Grebenyuk	6	6
WC	(Hungary) Ivett Imre	4	1
(Romania) Ágnes Szatmári	0	6^{3}
7	(Croatia) Nika Ožegović	6	7^{7}

Second round
2	(Slovenia) Andreja Klepač	1	6	6
(Slovakia) Lenka Tvarošková	6	3	4
(Russia) Evgenia Grebenyuk	3	6	1
7	(Croatia) Nika Ožegović	'6	4	6

Qualifying
2	(Slovenia) Andreja Klepač	4	6	6
7	(Croatia) Nika Ožegović	6	3	4

=== Third qualifier ===
Third round
3	(Germany) Gréta Arn	6	6
(Austria) Nicole Rottmann	0	1
(Ukraine) Veronika Kapshay	2	7	2
(Czech Republic) Vladimíra Uhlířová	6	5	6
(Poland) Urszula Radwańska	4	3
(Ukraine) Mariya Koryttseva	6	6
(Germany) Sabine Lisicki	6	6
5	(Germany) Julia Görges	4	4

Second round
3	(Germany) Gréta Arn	6	6
(Czech Republic) Vladimíra Uhlířová	3	2
(Ukraine) Mariya Koryttseva	7	7^{7}'
(Germany) Sabine Lisicki	5	6^{5}

Qualifying
3	(Germany) Gréta Arn	6	6
(Ukraine) Mariya Koryttseva	2	4

=== Fourth qualifier ===
First round
4	(Poland) Joanna Sakowicz	7^{7}	6
WC	(Hungary) Klaudia Halász	6^{4}	0
(Latvia) Līga Dekmeijere	6	6
(Germany) Justine Ozga	2	3
(Czech Republic) Zora Vlčková	0	0
(France) Julie Coin	6	6
(Romania) Diana-Andreea Gae	6	0	2
8	(Czech Republic) Lucie Hradecká	4	6	6

Second round
4	(Poland) Joanna Sakowicz	6	6
(Latvia) Līga Dekmeijere	4	3
(France) Julie Coin	5	5
8	(Czech Republic) Lucie Hradecká	7	7

Qualifying
4	(Poland) Joanna Sakowicz	0	2
8	(Czech Republic) Lucie Hradecká	6	6
