= 2010 Rogers Cup – Women's singles =

Women's singles
- 2010 Rogers Cup

Final
- Champion: (Denmark) Caroline Wozniacki
- Runner-up: (Russia) Vera Zvonareva
- Score: 6–3, 6–2

Details
- Draw: 56 (4WC/8Q/2LL)
- Seeds: 18

Events
Singles	men	women
Doubles	men	women
- Canadian Open

Caroline Wozniacki defeated Vera Zvonareva in the final, 6–3, 6–2 to win the women's singles tennis title at the 2010 Canadian Open.

Elena Dementieva was the defending champion, but lost in the third round to Zheng Jie.

== Seeds ==
The top eight seeds receive a bye into the second round.

1. (Serbia) Jelena Janković (second round)
2. (Denmark) Caroline Wozniacki (champion)
3. (United States) ~~Venus Williams~~ (withdrew due to left knee injury)
4. (Russia) Elena Dementieva (third round)
5. (Belgium) Kim Clijsters (quarterfinals)
6. (Italy) Francesca Schiavone (quarterfinals)
7. (Poland) Agnieszka Radwańska (third round)
8. (Russia) Vera Zvonareva (final)
9. (China) Li Na (third round)
10. (Belarus) Victoria Azarenka (semifinals, retired)
11. (Russia) Svetlana Kuznetsova (semifinals)
12. (Russia) ~~Maria Sharapova~~ (withdrew due to left foot injury)
13. (Belgium) Yanina Wickmayer (second round)
14. (Israel) Shahar Pe'er (first round)
15. (Italy) Flavia Pennetta (third round)
16. (France) Aravane Rezaï (second round)
17. (France) Marion Bartoli (quarterfinals)
18. (Russia) Nadia Petrova (second round)

== Main draw ==
Key

- Q = Qualifier
- WC = Wild card
- LL = Lucky loser
- Alt = Alternate
- ITF = ITF entry
- PR = Protected ranking
- SR = Special ranking
- SE = Special exempt
- JE = Junior exempt
- JR = Junior Accelerator Programme entrant
- CO = College Accelerator Programme entrant
- NG = Next Gen Accelerator Program entrant
- w/o = Walkover
- r = Retired
- d = Defaulted

=== Finals ===
Quarterfinals
17	(France) Marion Bartoli	2	6^{6}
10	(Belarus) Victoria Azarenka	6	7
5	(Belgium) Kim Clijsters	6	3	2
8	(Russia) Vera Zvonareva	2	6	6
11	(Russia) Svetlana Kuznetsova	6	6
(China) Zheng Jie	1	3
6	(Italy) Francesca Schiavone	3	2
2	(Denmark) Caroline Wozniacki	6	6

Semifinals
10	(Belarus) Victoria Azarenka	6^{6}	0^{r}
8	(Russia) Vera Zvonareva	7	1
11	(Russia) Svetlana Kuznetsova	2	3
2	(Denmark) Caroline Wozniacki	6	6

Final
8	(Russia) Vera Zvonareva	3	2
2	(Denmark) Caroline Wozniacki	6	6

=== Top half ===
==== Section 1 ====
First round
(Italy) S Errani	3	2
Q	(Czech Republic) I Benešová	6	6
LL	(Japan) K Date-Krumm	7	4	6
Q	(Romania) M Niculescu	6^{4}	6	2
WC	(Canada) V Tétreault	1	0
17	(France) M Bartoli	6	6
10	(Belarus) V Azarenka	6	6
(Ukraine) K Bondarenko	1	1
(Russia) M Kirilenko	6	6
(Slovakia) D Cibulková	0	3
Q	(Australia) J Groth	7	6
(Ukraine) A Bondarenko	6^{9}	2

Second round
1	(Serbia) J Janković	6^{3}	3
Q	(Czech Republic) I Benešová	7	6
LL	(Japan) K Date-Krumm
17	(France) M Bartoli	w/o
10	(Belarus) V Azarenka	6	6
(Russia) M Kirilenko	4	1
Q	(Australia) J Groth	3	2
9	(China) N Li	6	6

Third round
Q	(Czech Republic) I Benešová	0	1
17	(France) M Bartoli	6	6
10	(Belarus) V Azarenka	6	6
9	(China) N Li	3	3

Quarterfinals
17	(France) M Bartoli	2	6^{6}
10	(Belarus) V Azarenka	6	7

==== Section 2 ====
First round
(United States) M Oudin	1	4
Q	(United States) B Mattek-Sands	6	6
(Romania) A Dulgheru	2	6	3
(Austria) S Bammer	6	3	6
(Estonia) K Kanepi	6	6
14	(Israel) S Pe'er	3	3
13	(Belgium) Y Wickmayer	6	7
(Belarus) O Govortsova	3	6^{7}
(Hungary) Á Szávay	6	4	7
(Argentina) G Dulko	4	6	6^{3}
(Germany) A Kerber	7	1	4
(Kazakhstan) Y Shvedova	6^{5}	6	6

Second round
5	(Belgium) K Clijsters	4	6	6
Q	(United States) B Mattek-Sands	6	4	3
(Austria) S Bammer	5	2
(Estonia) K Kanepi	7	6
13	(Belgium) Y Wickmayer	7	3	4
(Hungary) Á Szávay	6^{5}	6	6
(Kazakhstan) Y Shvedova	2	1
8	(Russia) V Zvonareva	6	6

Third round
5	(Belgium) K Clijsters	6	6
(Estonia) K Kanepi	2	1
(Hungary) Á Szávay	3	3
8	(Russia) V Zvonareva	6	6

Quarterfinals
5	(Belgium) K Clijsters	6	3	2
8	(Russia) V Zvonareva	2	6	6

=== Bottom half ===
==== Section 3 ====
First round
Q	(United States) V King	4	6	6
(Spain) A Medina Garrigues	6	1	2
(Switzerland) T Bacsinszky	6	6
WC	(Canada) A Wozniak	3	2
(Russia) A Pavlyuchenkova	5	6	1
11	(Russia) S Kuznetsova	7	4	6
16	(France) A Rezaï	6^{1}	7	6
(Czech Republic) P Kvitová	7	5	3
(China) J Zheng	6	6
(Slovenia) K Srebotnik	3	2
WC	(Canada) S Dubois	6	5	3
(Czech Republic) K Zakopalová	4	7	6

Second round
7	(Poland) A Radwańska	6	6
Q	(United States) V King	0	3
(Switzerland) T Bacsinszky	6^{6}	4
11	(Russia) S Kuznetsova	7	6
16	(France) A Rezaï	7	6^{6}	1
(China) J Zheng	5	7	6
(Czech Republic) K Zakopalová	2	4
4	(Russia) E Dementieva	6	6

Third round
7	(Poland) A Radwańska	4	6	3
11	(Russia) S Kuznetsova	6	1	6
(China) J Zheng	7	6
4	(Russia) E Dementieva	6^{3}	4

Quarterfinals
11	(Russia) S Kuznetsova	6	6
(China) J Zheng	1	3

==== Section 4 ====
First round
Q	(Russia) E Makarova	6	6
Q	(Czech Republic) L Hradecká	0	4
(Germany) A Petkovic	3	3
(Russia) D Safina	6	6
(Czech Republic) L Šafářová	5	6	3
18	(Russia) N Petrova	7	4	6
15	(Italy) F Pennetta	6	7
(Slovakia) D Hantuchová	0	5
(Russia) A Kleybanova	6	6
Q	(Canada) H El Tabakh	1	2
WC	(France) V Razzano	7	5	3
LL	(Switzerland) P Schnyder	6^{4}	7	6

Second round
6	(Italy) F Schiavone	6	6^{5}	6
Q	(Russia) E Makarova	4	7	2
(Russia) D Safina	7	4	6
18	(Russia) N Petrova	5	6	4
15	(Italy) F Pennetta	6	6
(Russia) A Kleybanova	3	3
LL	(Switzerland) P Schnyder	5	5
2	(Denmark) C Wozniacki	7	7

Third round
6	(Italy) F Schiavone	6	6
(Russia) D Safina	4	3
15	(Italy) F Pennetta	6	3	1
2	(Denmark) C Wozniacki	4	6	6

Quarterfinals
6	(Italy) F Schiavone	3	2
2	(Denmark) C Wozniacki	6	6

== Qualifying ==
=== Qualifying seeds ===
1. (Czech Republic) Barbora Záhlavová-Strýcová (second round)
2. (Russia) ~~Elena Vesnina~~ (withdrew due to a left calf injury)
3. (Switzerland) Patty Schnyder (qualifying competition, lucky loser)
4. (Italy) Roberta Vinci (second round)
5. (United Kingdom) Elena Baltacha (first round)
6. (Spain) Arantxa Parra Santonja (second round)
7. (Japan) Kimiko Date-Krumm (qualifying competition, lucky loser)
8. (Australia) ~~Anastasia Rodionova~~ (withdrew, still competing at Cincinnati)
9. (Australia) Jarmila Groth (qualified)
10. (Russia) Ekaterina Makarova (qualified)
11. (Russia) Vera Dushevina (qualifying competition)
12. (Italy) Tathiana Garbin (second round)
13. (Romania) Sorana Cîrstea (qualifying competition)
14. (Czech Republic) Iveta Benešová (qualified)
15. (France) Alizé Cornet (qualifying competition)
16. (United States) Vania King (qualified)
17. (Chinese Taipei) Chang Kai-chen (first round)
18. (Italy) Alberta Brianti (second round)

=== Qualifiers ===
1. (Romania) Monica Niculescu
2. (Russia) Ekaterina Makarova
3. (Czech Republic) Iveta Benešová
4. (United States) Bethanie Mattek-Sands
5. (Czech Republic) Lucie Hradecká
6. (Canada) Heidi El Tabakh
7. (Australia) Jarmila Groth
8. (United States) Vania King

=== Lucky losers ===
1. (Switzerland) Patty Schnyder
2. (Japan) Kimiko Date-Krumm

=== Qualifying draw ===
==== First qualifier ====
First round
1	(Czech Republic) Barbora Záhlavová-Strýcová	6	6
WC	(Russia) Maria Kondratieva	0	2
(Romania) Monica Niculescu	6	6
(United States) Varvara Lepchenko	3	1
(Serbia) Bojana Jovanovski	6	6
(Canada) Sharon Fichman	1	4
(Japan) Kurumi Nara	3^{r}
13	(Romania) Sorana Cîrstea	3

Second round
1	(Czech Republic) Barbora Záhlavová-Strýcová	3	4
(Romania) Monica Niculescu	6	6
(Serbia) Bojana Jovanovski	6^{4}	3
13	(Romania) Sorana Cîrstea	7^{7}	6

Qualifying competition
(Romania) Monica Niculescu	6	6
13	(Romania) Sorana Cîrstea	3	3

==== Second qualifier ====
First round
17	(Chinese Taipei) Chang Kai-chen	3	6	3
(Canada) Rebecca Marino	6	3	6
(Colombia) Mariana Duque Mariño	3	0
(France) Mathilde Johansson	6	6
(United States) Alison Riske	6	6
WC	(Canada) Eugenie Bouchard	4	2
WC	(Belgium) Tamaryn Hendler	4	0
10	(Russia) Ekaterina Makarova	6	6

Second round
(Canada) Rebecca Marino	6	7^{7}
(France) Mathilde Johansson	4	6^{3}
(United States) Alison Riske	3	6^{2}
10	(Russia) Ekaterina Makarova	6	7^{7}

Qualifying competition
(Canada) Rebecca Marino	4	4
10	(Russia) Ekaterina Makarova	6	6

==== Third qualifier ====
First round
3	(Switzerland) Patty Schnyder	6	6
(United States) Julie Ditty	2	1
WC	(Canada) Marie-Ève Pelletier	5	5
(Spain) Nuria Llagostera Vives	7	7
WC	(Canada) Ekaterina Shulaeva	6	7^{7}
(Russia) Anastasia Pivovarova	0	6^{4}
WC	(Canada) Élisabeth Abanda	1	4
14	(Czech Republic) Iveta Benešová	6	6

Second round
3	(Switzerland) Patty Schnyder	6	7^{7}
(Spain) Nuria Llagostera Vives	1	6^{4}
WC	(Canada) Ekaterina Shulaeva	3	2
14	(Czech Republic) Iveta Benešová	6	6

Qualifying competition
3	(Switzerland) Patty Schnyder	6^{5}	1
14	(Czech Republic) Iveta Benešová	7^{7}	6

==== Fourth qualifier ====
First round
4	(Italy) Roberta Vinci	6	6
(France) Julie Coin	1	2
(Croatia) Ajla Tomljanović	3	4
(United States) Bethanie Mattek-Sands	6	6
(Austria) Tamira Paszek	2	6	0
(Germany) Anna-Lena Grönefeld	6	4	6
(Netherlands) Michaëlla Krajicek	3	2
11	(Russia) Vera Dushevina	6	6

Second round
4	(Italy) Roberta Vinci	4	3
(United States) Bethanie Mattek-Sands	6	6
(Germany) Anna-Lena Grönefeld	3	1
11	(Russia) Vera Dushevina	6	6

Qualifying competition
(United States) Bethanie Mattek-Sands	7^{7}	6
11	(Russia) Vera Dushevina	6^{5}	2

==== Fifth qualifier ====
First round
5	(United Kingdom) Elena Baltacha	2	3
(Japan) Ayumi Morita	6	6
(Czech Republic) Lucie Hradecká	7	1	6
(France) Pauline Parmentier	5	6	1
(France) Stéphanie Cohen-Aloro	3	2
WC	(Canada) Gabriela Dabrowski	6	6
WC	(Czech Republic) Vladimíra Uhlířová	6^{1}	4
15	(France) Alizé Cornet	7^{7}	6

Second round
(Japan) Ayumi Morita	5	6^{7}
(Czech Republic) Lucie Hradecká	7	7^{9}
WC	(Canada) Gabriela Dabrowski	1	3
15	(France) Alizé Cornet	6	6

Qualifying competition
(Czech Republic) Lucie Hradecká	6	7
15	(France) Alizé Cornet	4	5

==== Sixth qualifier ====
First round
6	(Spain) Arantxa Parra Santonja	6	0	7
(New Zealand) Marina Erakovic	1	6	5
(Croatia) Karolina Šprem	6	7
(Ukraine) Olga Savchuk	1	5
(Czech Republic) Andrea Hlaváčková	5	4
(Canada) Heidi El Tabakh	7	6
(Russia) Alla Kudryavtseva	6	2	1
12	(Italy) Tathiana Garbin	2	6	6

Second round
6	(Spain) Arantxa Parra Santonja	4	4
(Croatia) Karolina Šprem	6	6
(Canada) Heidi El Tabakh	7^{7}	6
12	(Italy) Tathiana Garbin	6^{4}	2

Qualifying competition
(Croatia) Karolina Šprem	6	3	2
(Canada) Heidi El Tabakh	3	6	6

==== Seventh qualifier ====
First round
7	(Japan) Kimiko Date-Krumm	6	6
(United Kingdom) Katie O'Brien	0	2
(Australia) Alicia Molik	4	3
(Poland) Urszula Radwańska	6	6
WC	(United States) Abigail Spears	7	6
(United States) Julia Cohen	5	1
(Australia) Sophie Ferguson	2	1
9	(Australia) Jarmila Groth	6	6

Second round
7	(Japan) Kimiko Date-Krumm	6	3	7^{7}
(Poland) Urszula Radwańska	1	6	6^{2}
WC	(United States) Abigail Spears	4	3
9	(Australia) Jarmila Groth	6	6

Qualifying competition
7	(Japan) Kimiko Date-Krumm	2	0
9	(Australia) Jarmila Groth	6	6

==== Eighth qualifier ====
First round
18	(Italy) Alberta Brianti	6	6
(South Africa) Chanelle Scheepers	2	2
(Hungary) Gréta Arn	5	5
(Romania) Simona Halep	7	7
(India) Sania Mirza	6	6^{5}	4
(Netherlands) Arantxa Rus	3	7^{7}	6
(United States) Alexandra Stevenson	1	2
16	(United States) Vania King	6	6

Second round
18	(Italy) Alberta Brianti	1	1
(Romania) Simona Halep	6	6
(Netherlands) Arantxa Rus	2	1^{r}
16	(United States) Vania King	6	3

Qualifying competition
(Romania) Simona Halep	6^{5}	1
16	(United States) Vania King	7^{7}	6
