= 2007 Watsons Water Champions Challenge =

- 2007 Watsons Water Champions Challenge

Final
- Champion: (Belgium) Kim Clijsters
- Runner-up: (Russia) Maria Sharapova
- Score: 6–3, 7–6^{(10–8)}

Events
Singles	men	women
Doubles	men	women
- Watsons Water Champions Challenge

The 2007 Watsons Water Champions Challenge is a women's exhibition (no points for the world ranking can be earned) tennis tournament organized at the beginning of each season.

Kim Clijsters defeated Maria Sharapova in the final.

== Players ==
1. (Russia) Maria Sharapova (1)
2. (Russia) Svetlana Kuznetsova (2), later replaced by (Denmark) Caroline Wozniacki
3. (Belgium) Kim Clijsters (3)
4. (Russia) Elena Dementieva (4)
5. (Switzerland) Patty Schnyder
6. (Czech Republic) Nicole Vaidišová
7. (China) Yan Zi
8. (China) Zheng Jie

== Results ==
=== Golden Group (Main Draw) ===
Quarterfinals
1	(Russia) Maria Sharapova	7	6
(China) Yan Zi	5	3
(Czech Republic) Nicole Vaidišová	6	3	2
4	(Russia) Elena Dementieva	3	6	6
3	(Belgium) Kim Clijsters	6	6
(China) Zheng Jie	3	2
(Switzerland) Patty Schnyder	1	6	7^{8}
2	(Russia) Svetlana Kuznetsova	6	3	6^{6}

Semifinals
1	(Russia) Maria Sharapova	4	6	6
4	(Russia) Elena Dementieva	6	2	3
3	(Belgium) Kim Clijsters	4	6	6
(Switzerland) Patty Schnyder	6	4	4

Final
1	(Russia) Maria Sharapova	3	6^{8}
3	(Belgium) Kim Clijsters	6	7^{10}

=== Silver Group (Losers Bracket) ===
Semifinals
(China) Yan Zi	7	6
(Czech Republic) Nicole Vaidišová	5	3
(China) Zheng Jie	3	4
2	(Russia) Svetlana Kuznetsova	6	6

Final
(China) Yan Zi	3	6	4
Alt	(Denmark) Caroline Wozniacki	6	4	6
