= Hong Kong Tennis Classic =

Women's tennis tournament

The Hong Kong Tennis Classic (formerly known as the JB Group Classic and the Watsons Water Champions Challenge) is a women's exhibition tennis tournament held (with temporary stands) in Victoria Park, Hong Kong, in the first week of January. It is a warm-up tournament for the Australian Open.

Formerly, the tournament was played under a more traditional format, with 8 players invited to participate, who would play against each other in a round robin format (with two groups of 4 players), with the top two players from each group progressing to the final. However, in 2009, the tournament switched to a group format, with four Zonal groups of three players; Team Americas, Team Asia-Pacific, Team Europe and Team Russia. Two teams play against each other in a semifinal, with three singles ties (amongst the three players) and 1 doubles tie. The two winning teams progress to the Gold Group final, playing for 1st and 2nd, whilst the losing teams progress to the Silver Group final, playing off for 3rd and 4th.

== Past finals ==
Year	Champion	Runner-up	Score
2011	Team Russia; Vera Zvonareva; Maria Kirilenko; Yevgeny Kafelnikov	Team Europe (Denmark) Caroline Wozniacki (France) Aravane Rezaï (Sweden) Stefan Edberg	3–1 (4 ties played)
2010	Team Russia; Maria Sharapova; Vera Zvonareva; Yevgeny Kafelnikov	Team Europe (Denmark) Caroline Wozniacki (Belarus) Victoria Azarenka (Sweden) Stefan Edberg	2–1 (3 ties played)
2009	Team Americas (United States) Venus Williams (Argentina) Gisela Dulko (United States) Coco Vandeweghe	Team Russia; Vera Zvonareva; Anna Chakvetadze; Alexandra Panova	3–1 (4 ties played)
2008	(United States) Venus Williams	(Russia) Maria Sharapova	6–4, 6–3
2007	(Belgium) Kim Clijsters	(Russia) Maria Sharapova	6–3, 7–6^{(10–8)}
2006	(Belgium) Kim Clijsters	(United States) Lindsay Davenport	6–3, 7–5
2005	(Russia) Elena Dementieva	(United States) Venus Williams	6–3, 6–2
2004	(United States) Venus Williams	(Russia) Maria Sharapova	7–5, 6–3
2003	(United States) Monica Seles	(United States) Chanda Rubin	5–7, 6–1, 6–2
2002	(United States) Jennifer Capriati	(Russia) Elena Dementieva	1–6, 6–4, 6–4
2001	(Federal Republic of Yugoslavia) Jelena Dokić	(Russia) Anna Kournikova	7–6^{(7–3)}, 6–3
2000	(United States) Jennifer Capriati	(Switzerland) Martina Hingis	7–6, 4–6, 6–3
1999	(United States) Venus Williams	(Germany) Steffi Graf	2–2 retired

== See also ==
- List of tennis tournaments
- Hong Kong Open (for men)
