= 2010 Polsat Warsaw Open =

- Date: 17–23 May
- Edition: 14th
- Category: WTA Premier
- Draw: 30S / 16D
- Prize money: $600,000
- Surface: Clay / outdoor
- Location: Warsaw, Poland

Champions

Singles
- (Romania) Alexandra Dulgheru

Doubles
- (Spain) Virginia Ruano Pascual / (United States) Meghann Shaughnessy
- Warsaw Open

The 2010 Polsat Warsaw Open was a women's tennis tournament played on outdoor clay courts. It was the 14th edition of the Warsaw Open, and was part of the Premier-level tournaments of the 2010 WTA Tour. It took place at the Legia Tennis Centre in Warsaw, Poland, from 17 May until 23 May 2009. Unseeded Alexandra Dulgheru won her second consecutive singles title at the event.

== Finals ==
=== Singles ===
(Romania) Alexandra Dulgheru defeated (China) Zheng Jie, 6–3, 6–4

- It was Dulgheru's only singles title of the year and the 2nd and last of her career.

=== Doubles ===
(Spain) Virginia Ruano Pascual / (United States) Meghann Shaughnessy defeated (Zimbabwe) Cara Black / (China) Yan Zi, 6–3, 6–4

== Entrants ==
=== Seeds ===
Player	Nationality	Ranking*	Seeding
Caroline Wozniacki	Denmark	2	1
Elena Dementieva	Russia	6	2
Li Na	China	13	3
Marion Bartoli	France	15	4
Zheng Jie	China	25	5
Alona Bondarenko	Ukraine	26	6
Kateryna Bondarenko	Ukraine	32	7
Melanie Oudin	United States	37	8

- Seedings are based on the rankings of May 10, 2010.

=== Other entrants ===
The following players received wildcards into the main draw:

- (Poland) Marta Domachowska
- (Poland) Katarzyna Piter

The following players received entry from the qualifying draw:

- (Hungary) Gréta Arn
- (Romania) Irina-Camelia Begu
- (Serbia) Bojana Jovanovski
- (Bulgaria) Tsvetana Pironkova

The following player received the lucky loser spot:

- (Slovenia) Andreja Klepač
