= 2006 Watsons Water Champions Challenge =

- 2006 Watsons Water Champions Challenge

Final
- Champion: (Belgium) Kim Clijsters
- Runner-up: (United States) Lindsay Davenport
- Score: 6–3, 7–5

Events
Singles	men	women
Doubles	men	women
- Watsons Water Champions Challenge

The 2006 Watsons Water Champions Challenge is a women's exhibition (no points for the world ranking can be earned) tennis tournament organized at the beginning of each season.

Kim Clijsters beat Lindsay Davenport in the final.

== Players ==
1. (United States) Lindsay Davenport (1)
2. (Belgium) Kim Clijsters (2)
3. (Russia) Elena Dementieva (3)
4. (United States) Venus Williams (4)
5. (United States) Serena Williams
6. (Czech Republic) Nicole Vaidišová
7. (India) Sania Mirza
8. (China) Zheng Jie

== Results ==
=== Golden Group (Main Draw) ===
Quarterfinals
1	(United States) Lindsay Davenport	6	6
(Czech Republic) Nicole Vaidišová	2	2
(India) Sania Mirza	3	3
4	(United States) Venus Williams	6	6
3	(Russia) Elena Dementieva	6	6
(United States) Serena Williams	3	1
(China) Zheng Jie	6	2	2
2	(Belgium) Kim Clijsters	3	6	6

Semifinals
1	(United States) Lindsay Davenport	6	6
4	(United States) Venus Williams	3	1
3	(Russia) Elena Dementieva	3	3
2	(Belgium) Kim Clijsters	6	6

Final
1	(United States) Lindsay Davenport	3	5
2	(Belgium) Kim Clijsters	6	7

=== Silver Group (Losers Bracket) ===
Semifinals
(Czech Republic) Nicole Vaidišová	7^{8}	6
(India) Sania Mirza	6^{6}	3
(United States) Serena Williams
(China) Zheng Jie	w/o

Final
(Czech Republic) Nicole Vaidišová	6	3
(China) Zheng Jie	2	1^{r}
