= 2010 Polsat Warsaw Open – Doubles =

Doubles
- 2010 Polsat Warsaw Open

Final
- Champion: (Spain) Virginia Ruano Pascual (United States) Meghann Shaughnessy
- Runner-up: (Zimbabwe) Cara Black (China) Yan Zi
- Score: 6–3, 6–4

Details
- Draw: 16
- Seeds: 4

Events
Singles	Doubles
← 2009 ·	Polsat Warsaw Open	· 2021 →

Raquel Kops-Jones and Bethanie Mattek-Sands were the defending champions, but Mattek-Sands chose not to participate this year.
Kops-Jones partnered up with Sarah Borwell, but they lost in the quarterfinals against Cara Black and Yan Zi.
Virginia Ruano Pascual and Meghann Shaughnessy won in the final 6–3, 6–4 against Black and Yan.

== Seeds ==
1. (Zimbabwe) Cara Black / (China) Yan Zi (final)
2. (Italy) Tathiana Garbin / (United States) Liezel Huber (first round)
3. (Chinese Taipei) Hsieh Su-wei / (China) Zheng Jie (semifinals, retired)
4. (Czech Republic) Iveta Benešová / (Czech Republic) Barbora Záhlavová-Strýcová (first round)

== Draw ==
=== Key ===
- Q = Qualifier
- WC = Wild card
- LL = Lucky loser
- Alt = Alternate
- SE = Special exempt
- PR = Protected ranking
- ITF = ITF entry
- JE = Junior exempt
- w/o = Walkover
- r = Retired
- d = Defaulted
- SR = Special ranking

=== Main draw ===
First round
1	(Zimbabwe) C Black (China) Z Yan	3	6	[10]
(South Africa) N Grandin (United States) A Spears	6	2	[8]
(United Kingdom) S Borwell (United States) R Kops-Jones	7	6
WC	(Poland) P Kania (Poland) M Linette	6^{6}	0
4	(Czech Republic) I Benešová (Czech Republic) B Záhlavová-Strýcová	6	4	[1]
(Russia) M Kondratieva (Czech Republic) V Uhlířová	2	6	[10]
(Switzerland) T Bacsinszky (Latvia) L Dekmeijere	3	6	[11]
(Belarus) O Govortsova (Poland) K Jans	6	4	[13]
(Italy) S Errani (Italy) R Vinci	6	6
(Czech Republic) K Zakopalová (United States) R Zalameda	1	4
(Ukraine) A Bondarenko (Ukraine) K Bondarenko	7	5	[8]
3	(Chinese Taipei) S-w Hsieh (China) J Zheng	5	7	[10]
(Spain) V Ruano Pascual (United States) M Shaughnessy	6	6
(Poland) A Rosolska (Kazakhstan) Y Shvedova	4	1
(Belarus) T Poutchek (Turkey) İ Şenoğlu	6	7
2	(Italy) T Garbin (United States) L Huber	4	6^{8}

Quarterfinals
1	(Zimbabwe) C Black (China) Z Yan	6	5	[10]
(United Kingdom) S Borwell (United States) R Kops-Jones	0	7	[5]
(Russia) M Kondratieva (Czech Republic) V Uhlířová	5	4
(Belarus) O Govortsova (Poland) K Jans	7	6
(Italy) S Errani (Italy) R Vinci	7	4	[5]
3	(Chinese Taipei) S-w Hsieh (China) J Zheng	6^{3}	6	[10]
(Spain) V Ruano Pascual (United States) M Shaughnessy	6	6
(Belarus) T Poutchek (Turkey) İ Şenoğlu	1	2

Semifinals
1	(Zimbabwe) C Black (China) Z Yan	6	6
(Belarus) O Govortsova (Poland) K Jans	1	4
3	(Chinese Taipei) S-w Hsieh (China) J Zheng	4	r
(Spain) V Ruano Pascual (United States) M Shaughnessy	6

Finals
1	(Zimbabwe) C Black (China) Z Yan	3	4
(Spain) V Ruano Pascual (United States) M Shaughnessy	6	6
