= 2010 Polsat Warsaw Open – Singles =

Singles
- 2010 Polsat Warsaw Open

Final
- Champion: (Romania) Alexandra Dulgheru
- Runner-up: (China) Zheng Jie
- Score: 6–3, 6–4

Details
- Draw: 30
- Seeds: 8

Events
Singles	Doubles
- Polsat Warsaw Open

Alexandra Dulgheru was the defending champion, and won in the final 6–3, 6–4 against Zheng Jie.

== Seeds ==
The top two seeds received a bye into the second round.

1. (Denmark) Caroline Wozniacki (quarterfinals, retired due to injured ankle)
2. (Russia) Elena Dementieva (second round)
3. (China) Li Na (semifinals)
4. (France) Marion Bartoli (first round)
5. (China) Zheng Jie (final)
6. (Ukraine) Alona Bondarenko (quarterfinals)
7. (Ukraine) Kateryna Bondarenko (first round)
8. (United States) Melanie Oudin (first round)

== Draw ==
Key

- Q = Qualifier
- WC = Wild card
- LL = Lucky loser
- Alt = Alternate
- ITF = ITF entry
- PR = Protected ranking
- SR = Special ranking
- SE = Special exempt
- JE = Junior exempt
- JR = Junior Accelerator Programme entrant
- CO = College Accelerator Programme entrant
- NG = Next Gen Accelerator Program entrant
- w/o = Walkover
- r = Retired
- d = Defaulted

=== Finals ===
Semifinals
5	(China) Zheng Jie	6	7
Q	(Hungary) Gréta Arn	4	5
3	(China) Li Na	4	6	4
(Romania) Alexandra Dulgheru	6	3	6

Final
5	(China) Zheng Jie	3	4
(Romania) Alexandra Dulgheru	6	6

=== Top half ===
First round
(Germany) A Kerber	2	3
(Slovenia) P Hercog	6	6
(Czech Republic) I Benešová	3	4
(Italy) T Garbin	6	6
(Belarus) O Govortsova	1	7	5
5	(China) J Zheng	6	5	7
4	(France) M Bartoli	6	1	2
(Czech Republic) K Zakopalová	4	6	6
(Croatia) P Martić	5	7	3
Q	(Hungary) G Arn	7	6^{5}	6
LL	(Slovenia) A Klepač	3	1
(Czech Republic) B Záhlavová-Strýcová	6	6
(Italy) R Vinci	3	1
6	(Ukraine) A Bondarenko	6	6

Second round
1	(Denmark) C Wozniacki	2	6	6
(Slovenia) P Hercog	6	3	4
(Italy) T Garbin	1	1
5	(China) J Zheng	6	6
(Czech Republic) K Zakopalová	4	4
Q	(Hungary) G Arn	6	6
(Czech Republic) B Záhlavová-Strýcová	2	4
6	(Ukraine) A Bondarenko	6	6

Quarterfinals
1	(Denmark) C Wozniacki	3	r
5	(China) J Zheng	6
Q	(Hungary) G Arn	5	6	6
6	(Ukraine) A Bondarenko	7	4	4

Semifinals
5	(China) J Zheng	6	7
Q	(Hungary) G Arn	4	5

=== Bottom half ===
First round
8	(United States) M Oudin	0	2
(Slovakia) M Rybáriková	6	6
(Italy) S Errani	6	6
Q	(Serbia) B Jovanovski	1	0
WC	(Poland) M Domachowska	6^{3}	6	5
WC	(Poland) K Piter	7	4	7
(Romania) IR Olaru	6^{4}	0
3	(China) N Li	7	6
7	(Ukraine) K Bondarenko	3	1
(Romania) A Dulgheru	6	6
(Switzerland) T Bacsinszky	6	6
Q	(Romania) I-C Begu	0	2
(Canada) A Wozniak	4	1
Q	(Bulgaria) T Pironkova	6	6

Second round
(Slovakia) M Rybáriková	6^{7}	3
(Italy) S Errani	7	6
WC	(Poland) K Piter	0	3
3	(China) N Li	6	6
(Romania) A Dulgheru	6	6
(Switzerland) T Bacsinszky	2	4
Q	(Bulgaria) T Pironkova	7	4	6
2	(Russia) E Dementieva	5	6	4

Quarterfinals
(Italy) S Errani	2	1
3	(China) N Li	6	6
(Romania) A Dulgheru	6	7
Q	(Bulgaria) T Pironkova	4	5

Semifinals
3	(China) N Li	4	6	4
(Romania) A Dulgheru	6	3	6
