= Patty Schnyder =

Swiss tennis player (born 1978)

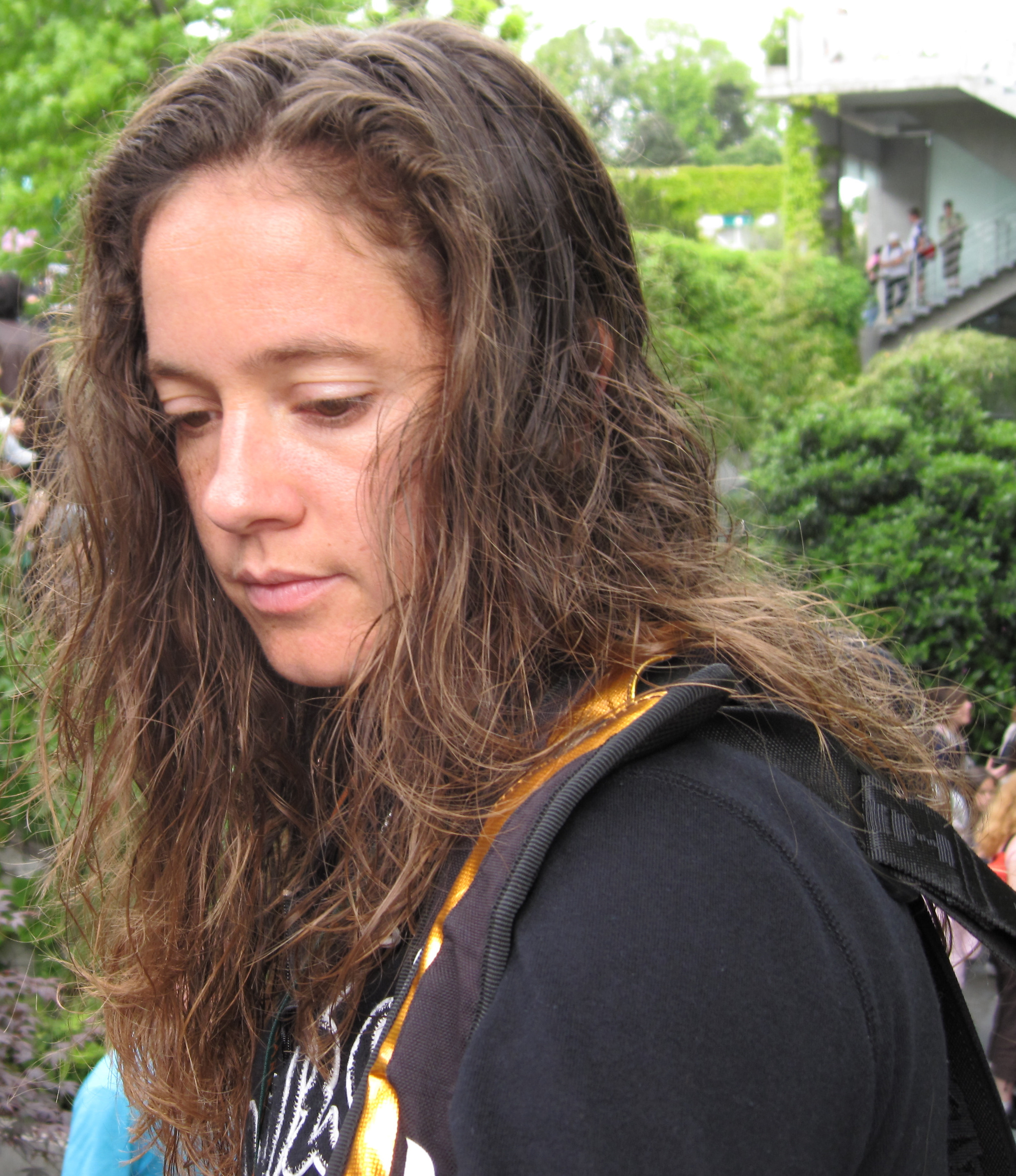
- Schnyder in 2009
- Country (sports): Switzerland
- Residence: Basel
- Born: 14 December 1978 (age 47) Basel
- Height: 1.68 m (5 ft 6 in)
- Turned pro: 1994
- Retired: 2011–2015, 2018
- Plays: Left (two-handed backhand)
- Prize money: $8,570,479

Singles
- Career record: 669–430
- Career titles: 11
- Highest ranking: No. 7 (14 November 2005)

Grand Slam singles results
- Australian Open: SF (2004)
- French Open: QF (1998, 2008)
- Wimbledon: 4R (2007)
- US Open: QF (1998, 2008)

Other tournaments
- Grand Slam Cup: F (1998)
- Tour Finals: RR (2005)
- Olympic Games: 3R (2004)

Doubles
- Career record: 230–245
- Career titles: 5
- Highest ranking: No. 15 (6 June 2005)

Grand Slam doubles results
- Australian Open: QF (2009)
- French Open: SF (2005)
- Wimbledon: 3R (2004)
- US Open: SF (2004)

Other doubles tournaments
- Olympic Games: QF (1996)

Grand Slam mixed doubles results
- Australian Open: QF (2009)
- French Open: 1R (2010)
- Wimbledon: 2R (1998)
- US Open: 1R (2004, 2009)

Team competitions
- Fed Cup: F (1998), record 50–23

Patty Schnyder (born 14 December 1978 in Basel) is a Swiss former professional tennis player. She has a career-high singles ranking of world No. 7, achieved in November 2005. Schnyder won eleven WTA Tour singles titles, including a Tier I event at the 2002 Zurich Open, as well as five doubles titles, earning almost $8.6 million USD in prize money. She twice defeated a reigning world No. 1 player in her career: Martina Hingis at the 1998 Grand Slam Cup (by retirement) and Jennifer Capriati at the Family Circle Cup in 2002. In addition, she has notable wins over such former No. 1 players as Lindsay Davenport, Serena Williams, Arantxa Sánchez Vicario, Steffi Graf, Kim Clijsters, Justine Henin, Amélie Mauresmo, Maria Sharapova, Jelena Janković, Ana Ivanovic, and Caroline Wozniacki.

== Personal life ==
On 5 December 2003, Schnyder married her German coach Rainer Hofmann, who was also an IT specialist, at a resort in Baden-Baden, Germany. In early 2014, three years following her retirement from tennis, Schnyder announced her divorce from Hofmann. In November 2014, she gave birth to a daughter, Kim Ayla, and initially kept the father's name a secret. She later named Jan Heino, her current partner, as Kim's father. In 2019, she had a second daughter.

== Career ==
=== 1994–2011: Top-10 breakthrough, major semifinal, success on the WTA Tour ===
In 1996, Schnyder made her Grand Slam main-draw debut at the French Open. In 1997, she quickly rose up through the rankings, and by August 1998 she had entered the WTA top 10. However, Schnyder fell out of the top 10 in April 1999 and spent the next six years ranked in the 15–30 range before re-entering the top 10 in May 2005.

In December 2003, Schnyder married Rainer Hofmann, who had accompanied her on the WTA Tour since 1999 and became her full-time tennis coach in early 2003.

Schnyder won eleven singles titles, including a victory in Zürich (Tier-I event) over former No. 1, Lindsay Davenport, and five doubles titles. Her first title on U.S. soil came in August 2005, when she won the Cincinnati Open. Schnyder defeated four top-10 players consecutively, including Serena Williams and then-world No. 1 Jennifer Capriati, in 2002 at the Family Circle Cup in Charleston, which is the largest women-only tennis event held in the United States.

Schnyder's best Grand Slam performance came at the 2004 Australian Open, where she reached the semifinals, before falling to Kim Clijsters. Later that season, she also reached the semifinals at the Tier-I tournaments in Charleston and Zurich, two large WTA events where Schnyder compiled an excellent record.

2005 was Schnyder's most consistent overall season to date. She reached five tour finals, winning two of them (Gold Coast and Cincinnati, both Tier-III events). She was runner-up at the Tier-I events Rome (to Amélie Mauresmo) and Zurich (to Lindsay Davenport). She also reached the final in Linz (Tier II), falling to Nadia Petrova. She reached the career high of world No. 7 after the end-of-season WTA Championships.

2006 proved to be a good season for Schnyder also, staying within the top 10 and reaching the finals in Charleston (defeating top seed and defending champion Justine Henin in the semifinals and also ending Henin's winning streak on clay, though Schnyder lost to Petrova in the final), and in Stanford (falling to top seed and defending champion Kim Clijsters).

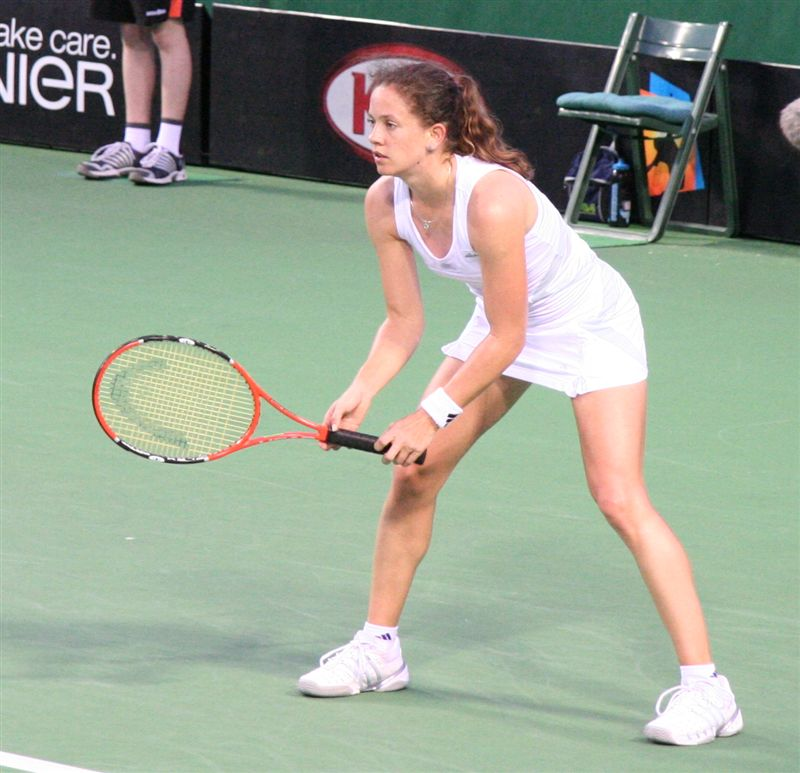
Patty Schnyder at the 2007 Australian Open

Schnyder had a mediocre year in 2007, and she lost her top-10 ranking. First, she obtained an invitation to play in the Watsons Water Champions Challenge. She reached the fourth round of the Australian Open, where she lost to Anna Chakvetadze after leading 4–1 in the first set. At the French Open, she reached the fourth round, where she had two match points against Maria Sharapova, but ended up losing 7–9 in the final set. At Wimbledon, she was beaten in the fourth round by No. 1, Justine Henin, in straight sets. At the Acura Classic in July, she reached the final, beating former No. 1 and compatriot, Martina Hingis, in three sets, and Russian Elena Dementieva, along the way, before losing to Sharapova, again in three sets. Schnyder briefly moved up due to this. However, at the US Open, she lost in the third round to the unseeded Austrian Tamira Paszek in a final-set tie-break, again wasting leads. After that, she played at the Porsche Tennis Grand Prix in Stuttgart, where she lost to Ana Ivanovic. She finished her year with a run to the Generali Ladies Linz final, beating Chakvetadze in the quarterfinals and Marion Bartoli in the semifinals, before convincingly losing in the final to Hantuchová.

Schnyder began 2008 by beating Mauresmo in the quarterfinals of the Mondial Women's Hardcourts tournament in the Gold Coast before losing to Li Na in the semifinals. At the Australian Open, she lost in the second round to Australian Casey Dellacqua. She then lost in the second round of the Proximus Diamond Games to eventual finalist Karin Knapp, losing in a final-set tiebreak. She entered the Qatar Open and beat Paszek easily. She lost to Slovakia's Dominika Cibulková in the second round. Schnyder then competed in the Bangalore Open, a Tier-II event in India. She defeated Akgul Amanmuradova, in the quarterfinals, and then managed to beat Yan Zi, in the semifinal. However, she lost to Serena Williams in the final in straight sets.

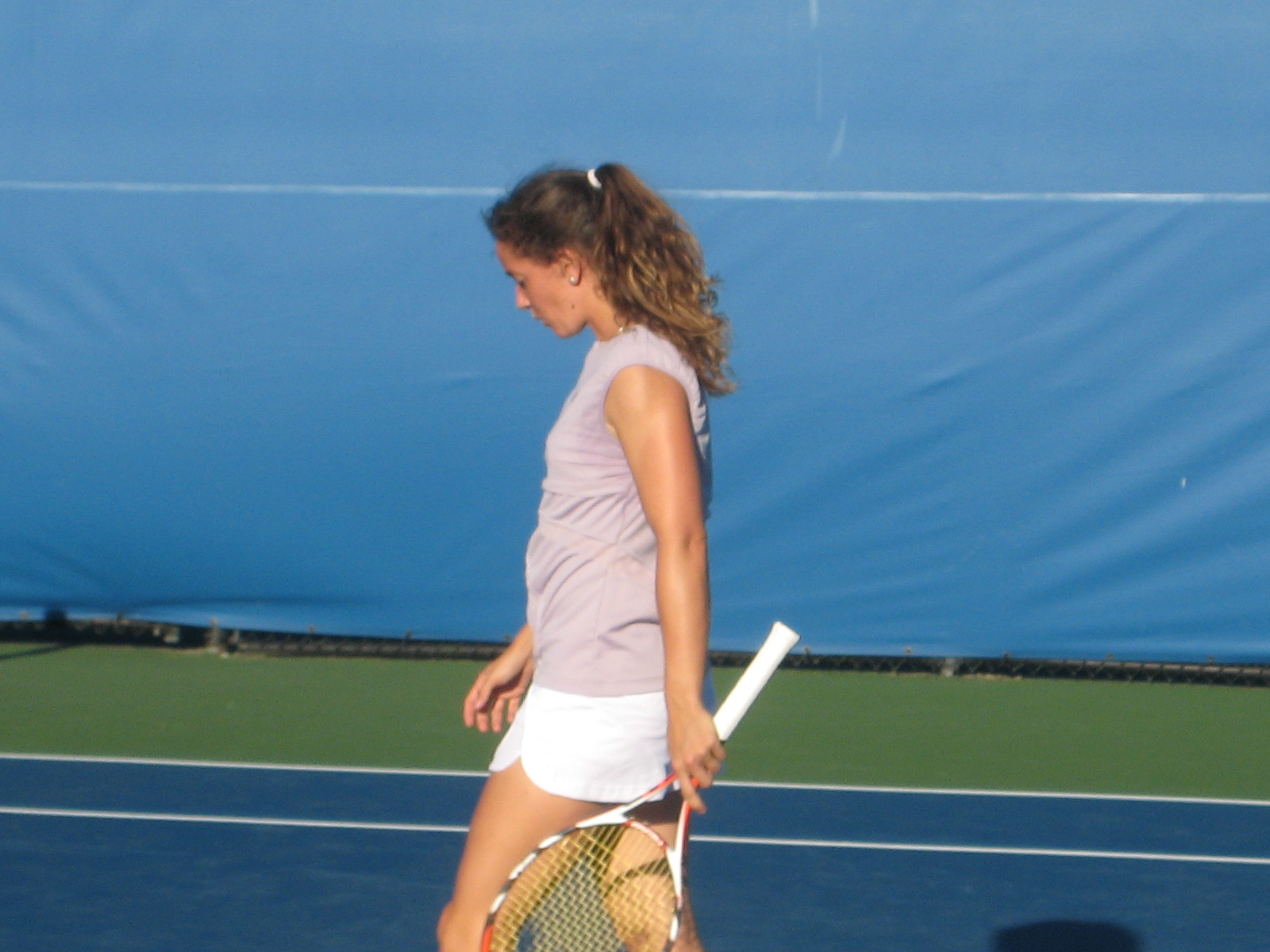
Schnyder at the 2008 Pilot Pen Tennis tournament

Schnyder again lost to Casey Dellacqua at Wimbledon in the first round, although she played an epic match. Alongside Emmanuelle Gagliardi, Schnyder played for her team in the 2008 Summer Olympics.

At the US Open, Schnyder was seeded 15th. She beat Katarina Srebotnik in the fourth round to advance to the quarterfinals for the first time in ten years, where she lost to fifth seeded Elena Dementieva. At the Commonwealth Bank Tennis Classic, Schnyder won her first title in over three years when she defeated Tamira Paszek in the final in two sets. At the 2009 Madrid Open, Schnyder defeated world No. 10, Nadia Petrova, in the third round and world No. 4, Jelena Janković, in the quarterfinals, but lost to world No. 1, Dinara Safina, in the semifinals.

2010 was a tough year for Patty. For the first time since 1996, she did not play in the Australian Open, due to injury. But, for the second year in a row, she made it to the final in Budapest against Ágnes Szávay, but again lost. She lost two match points in the third round of the US Open and double-faulted on match point against Yanina Wickmayer. She again made her second final of the year in Linz, but suffered an upset at the hands of Ana Ivanovic, losing in straight sets in just 47 minutes.

Schnyder did not play at the beginning of the 2011 season, prior to the Australian Open, due to illness. At the Australian Open, she lost to the qualifier Lesia Tsurenko in the first round. In a March 2011 Bleacher report, Schnyder was listed as one of ten most underrated players on the WTA Tour. Schnyder signaled, after disappointing first-round losses in both singles and doubles at the Family Circle Cup, that she would indeed be retiring sometime that year. Schnyder proved in April that she was still Switzerland's No. 1 women's tennis player when she, along with Timea Bacsinszky, helped propel Switzerland back into World Group II at the Fed Cup. She announced her retirement in May 2011, stating fatigue and lack of motivation as the main reasons for cutting her tennis career short.

=== 2015–2018: Comeback and success on the ITF Circuit, retirement ===
After the birth of her daughter in late 2014, Schnyder announced she wanted to "get back in shape". Hence, in mid-2015, Schnyder returned to the professional circuit and competed in ITF Circuit tournaments in Darmstadt, Germany (July) and Oldenzaal, Netherlands (August). She took her first title of her comeback in September when she won a $10k tournament in Prague, without losing a set all week. She made her second final of her comeback in Bangkok, losing to Kaia Kanepi.

In 2016, Schnyder played a complete season, competing in 20 tournaments (17 of which at ITF level). In the WTA rankings, she rose from No. 488 at beginning of the year to No. 298 at year-end. She made her comeback to the WTA Tour at the Charleston Open as wildcard, where she lost to No. 3 seed Samantha Crawford in the first round of qualifying, 2–6, 6–1, 2–6. The highlights of her 2016 season occurred at the ITF tournaments in Båstad, which she won, and Stuttgart-Vaihingen, where she reached the semifinals.

In 2017, Schnyder's comeback gained traction, as she won the ITF tournaments in Périgueux and Horb and additionally reached the finals in Essen, Biarritz and Toronto. At her home tournament in Gstaad, where she gained entry through a wildcard, she won her first main-draw match at Tour level since 2011, defeating compatriot Amra Sadiković in the first round before suffering defeat at the hands of Antonia Lottner in round two. With these results, she re-entered the top 200 and gained access to the qualifiers' draw at the US Open, where she lost to Nicole Gibbs in the second round.

In 2018, Schnyder qualified for the US Open just a few months shy of her 40th birthday. In the first round, she lost to Maria Sharapova in their first meeting in ten years. On 23 November 2018, she announced her retirement from professional tennis for the second time.

== Career statistics ==
=== Grand Slam performance timelines ===
Key
| W | F | SF | QF | #R | RR | Q# | P# | DNQ | A | Z# | PO | G | S | B | NMS | NTI | P | NH |

(W) winner; (F) finalist; (SF) semifinalist; (QF) quarterfinalist; (#R) rounds 4, 3, 2, 1; (RR) round-robin stage; (Q#) qualification round; (P#) preliminary round; (DNQ) did not qualify; (A) absent; (Z#) Davis/Fed Cup Zonal Group (with number indication) or (PO) play-off; (G) gold, (S) silver or (B) bronze Olympic/Paralympic medal; (NMS) not a Masters tournament; (NTI) not a Tier I tournament; (P) postponed; (NH) not held; (SR) strike rate (events won / competed); (W–L) win–loss record.

==== Singles ====
| Tournament | 1996 | 1997 | 1998 | 1999 | 2000 | 2001 | 2002 | 2003 | 2004 | 2005 | 2006 | 2007 | 2008 | 2009 | 2010 | 2011 | ... | 2017 | 2018 | SR | W–L |
|---|---|---|---|---|---|---|---|---|---|---|---|---|---|---|---|---|---|---|---|---|---|
| Australian Open | Q1 | 4R | 4R | 2R | 4R | 1R | 1R | 4R | SF | QF | QF | 4R | 2R | 2R | A | 1R | | A | Q1 | 0 / 14 | 31–14 |
| French Open | 1R | 3R | QF | 3R | 1R | 2R | 4R | 4R | 2R | 4R | 4R | 4R | QF | 1R | 1R | 1R | | A | A | 0 / 16 | 29–16 |
| Wimbledon | 1R | 1R | 2R | 1R | 2R | 3R | 2R | 1R | 2R | 1R | 2R | 4R | 1R | 1R | 1R | A | | A | Q1 | 0 / 15 | 10–15 |
| US Open | A | 3R | QF | 3R | 2R | 2R | 3R | 2R | 4R | 4R | 4R | 3R | QF | 2R | 3R | A | | Q2 | 1R | 0 / 15 | 31–15 |
| Win–loss | 0–2 | 7–4 | 12–4 | 5–4 | 5–4 | 4–4 | 6–4 | 7–4 | 10–4 | 10–4 | 11–4 | 11–4 | 9–4 | 2–4 | 2–3 | 0–2 | | 0–0 | 0–1 | 0 / 60 | 101–60 |

==== Doubles ====
| Tournament | 1997 | 1998 | 1999 | 2000 | 2001 | 2002 | 2003 | 2004 | 2005 | 2006 | 2007 | 2008 | 2009 | 2010 | 2011 | SR | W–L |
|---|---|---|---|---|---|---|---|---|---|---|---|---|---|---|---|---|---|
| Australian Open | 1R | 2R | 3R | 3R | 1R | 1R | 1R | 2R | 1R | A | 3R | 2R | QF | A | 3R | 0 / 13 | 14–13 |
| French Open | 3R | QF | 3R | A | 2R | QF | 3R | 3R | SF | 2R | 1R | 1R | QF | 1R | 2R | 0 / 14 | 24–14 |
| Wimbledon | 2R | 1R | 1R | 1R | 2R | 2R | 1R | 3R | A | A | 1R | A | A | 1R | A | 0 / 10 | 5–10 |
| US Open | 1R | QF | 1R | 2R | 1R | 2R | 2R | SF | QF | A | 2R | 3R | 3R | 1R | A | 0 / 13 | 18–13 |
| Win–loss | 3–4 | 7–4 | 4–4 | 3–3 | 2–4 | 5–4 | 3–4 | 9–4 | 7–3 | 1–1 | 3–4 | 3–3 | 8–3 | 0–3 | 3–2 | 0 / 50 | 61–50 |
