= Watsons Water =

Bottled water company in East Asia

- Native name
- Traditional Chinese: 屈臣氏蒸餾水
- Founded: 1903; 123 years ago
- Headquarters: Hong Kong
- Area served: Asia-pacific
- Website: watsons-water.com

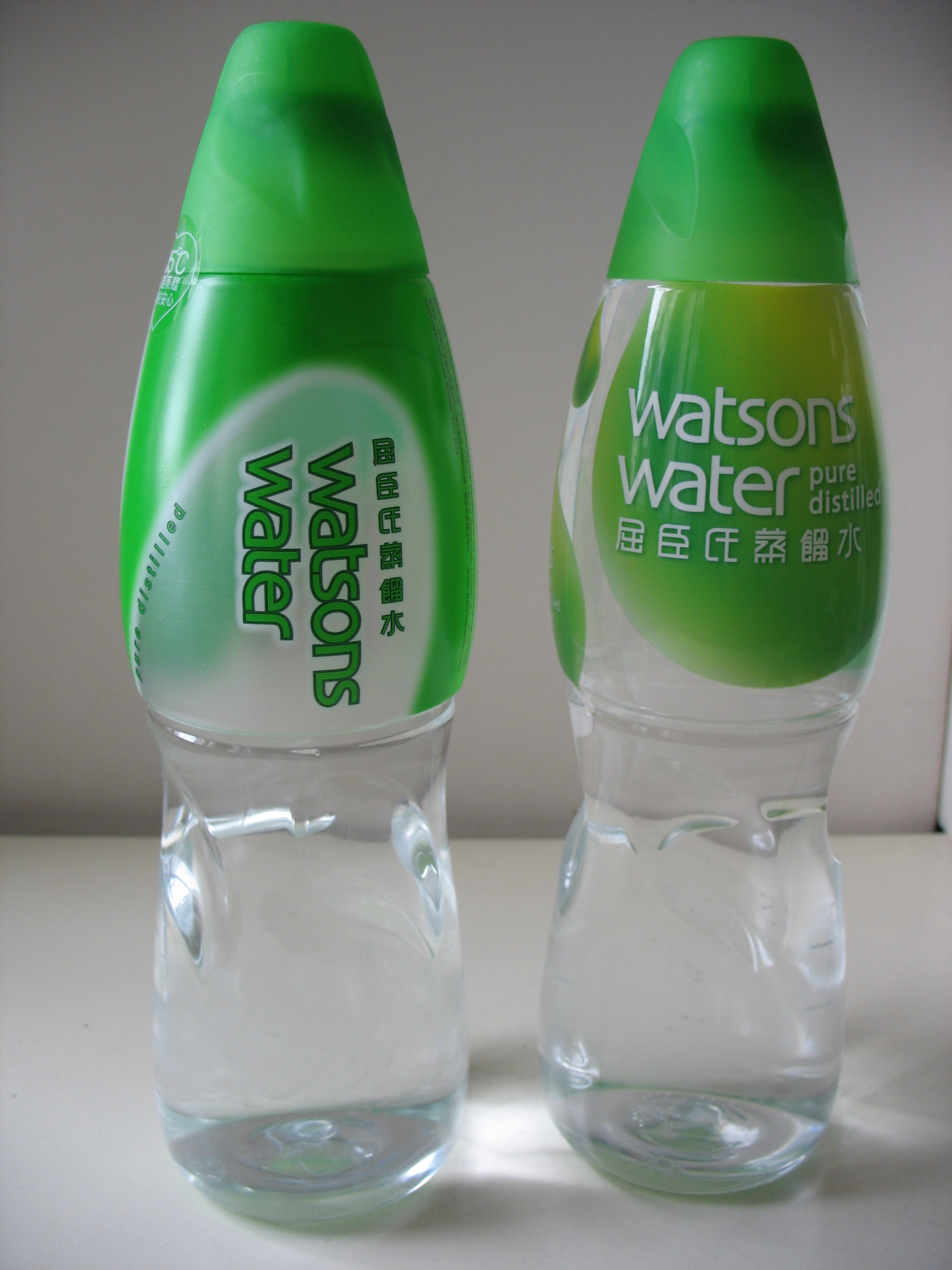
Watsons Distilled Water.

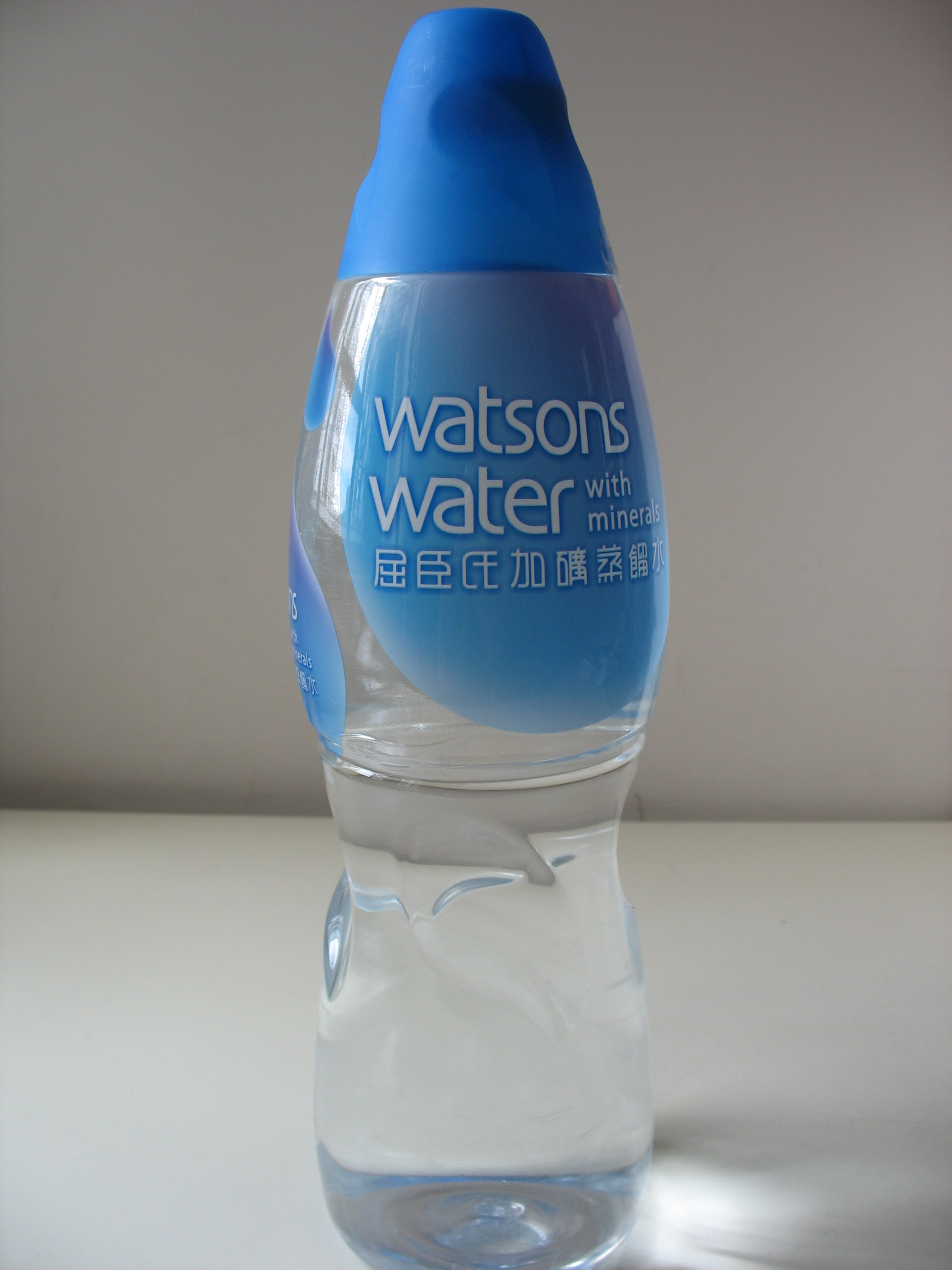
Watsons Distilled Water with added minerals.

Watsons Water (Chinese: 屈臣氏蒸餾水) is a producer and distributor of bottled distilled water based in Tai Po Industrial Estate in the New Territories of Hong Kong. The company has production plants in Hong Kong, Beijing, Shanghai, and Guangzhou. Its products are consumed across the Asia-Pacific region, including Singapore, Malaysia, and Taiwan.

== Sponsorship ==
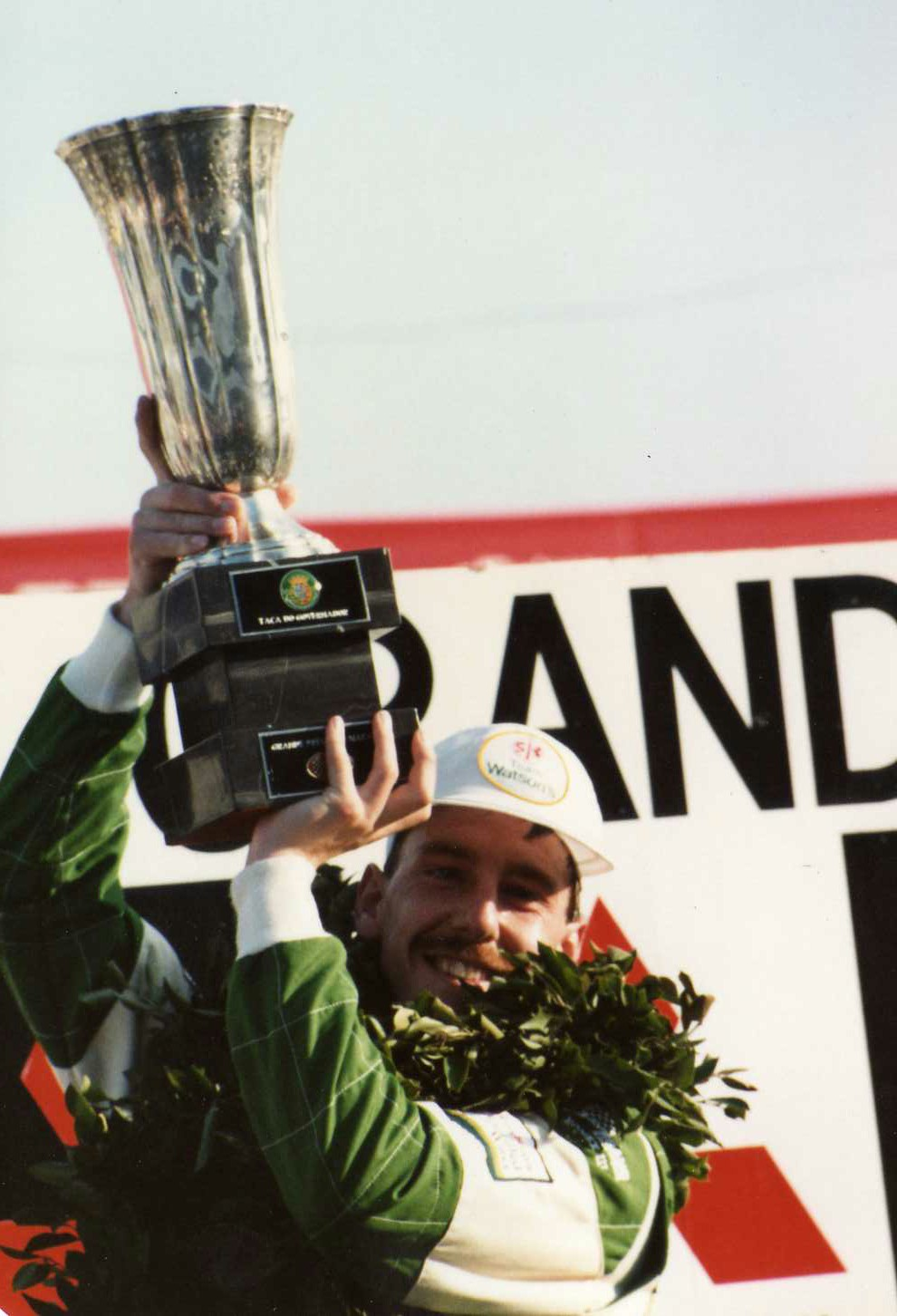
Andy Wallace winning the Macau F3 Grand Prix in 1986, sponsored by Watsons Water.

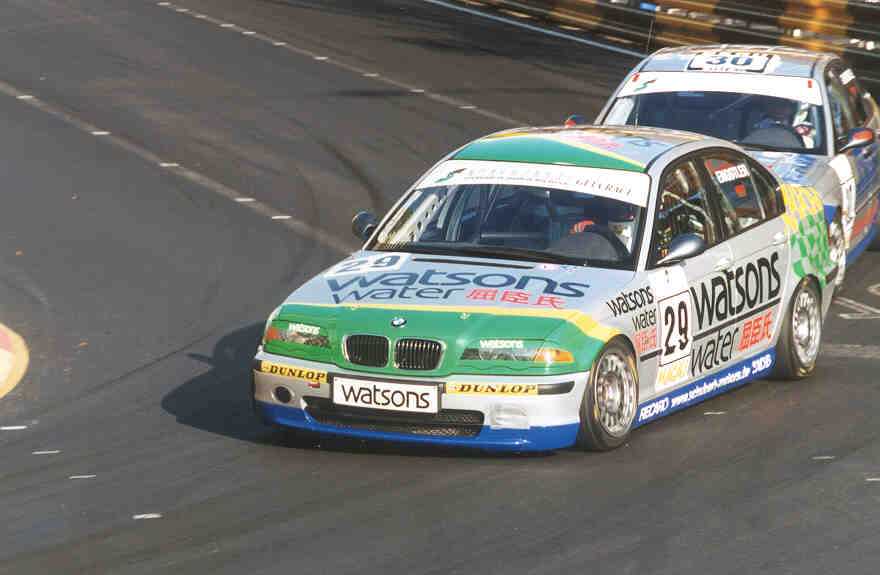
Franz Engstler's no. 29 BMW sponsored by Watsons Water in 2002.

Watsons has been a sponsor for numerous teams and drivers at the Macau Grand Prix. They made their debut in 1985 when Gianfranco Brancatelli won the Guia Race in a Tom Walkinshaw Racing Rover 3500 and then the following year when Andy Wallace won the Formula Three event. Watsons won again in 1987, with the Mr. Juicy brand, thanks to a great drive by Ireland's former Formula One driver Martin Donnelly in the typhoon affected race. In 1989, Tim Harvey brought the team more success with his Guia Race win in a Ford Sierra RS500. The following year in 1990, Watsons sponsored a Ford Sierra RS500 driven by BTCC Champion Robb Gravett. Tim Harvey returned alongside former F1 driver Julian Bailey in Vic Lee's BMW M3. Sister brand Mr. Juicy also sponsored the BMW's Schnizter Motorsport at the last minute, due to good practice result by the two M3 driven by Emanuele Pirro and Joachim Winkelhock. However, the Nissan GTR R-32 proved to be too strong, with only Pirro and Winkelhock finished in second and third position. In 1991, Watsons partnered with Schnitzer again and sent three BMW M3 with DTM specification, again driven by Pirro, Winkelhock and former Guia winner Roberto Ravaglia. They also sponsored a GTR R-32, driven by famous Australian racing driver Mark Skaife. Pirro won the race, but all other three Watsons car did not finish the race due to accident (Ravaglia), personal injury (Winkelhock) and mechanical failure (Skaife). Watsons sponsored Schnitzer again in 1993 with three new Super Touring specification BMW 318i, driven by Pirro, Winkelhock and Steve Soper. While Super Touring specification was the new global trend in touring car, the Guia race still welcomed DTM specification in 1993, and as a result the Watsons sponsored 318i could only finish second (Winkelhock) and third (Pirro), behind Charles Kwan's M3 in DTM spec. In 1997, Watsons sponsored again, this time with Team Bigazzi, bringing two BMW 320i with Winkelhock and Soper behind the wheels. The race was won by Soper, he also set the fastest lap of the race (2:29.253) and had kept this record lap time for touring car himself until José María López broke his record in 2014 (2:27.338).

In the 2000s, Watsons Water has sponsored other winning teams and drivers including Duncan Huisman who won the Guia Race four times.

== See also ==
- 2006 Watsons Water Champions Challenge
- List of food companies
- Wahaha, privately owned Chinese beverage manufacturer
