= 2011 Hong Kong Tennis Classic =

The 2011 Hong Kong Tennis Classic was held on 5–8 January. In 2011, there are four Zonal groups of three players; Team Americas, Team Asia-Pacific, Team Europe and Team Russia. Two teams play against each other in a semifinal, with three singles ties (amongst the three players) and 1 doubles tie. The two winning teams progress to the Gold Group final, playing for 1st and 2nd, whilst the losing teams progress to the Silver Group final, playing off for 3rd and 4th.

== 2011 Teams ==
Team	Players
Team Americas	(United States) Venus Williams (United States) Melanie Oudin (United States) John McEnroe
Team Asia-Pacific	(China) Li Na (Hong Kong) Zhang Ling (Australia) Mark Philippoussis
Team Europe	(Denmark) Caroline Wozniacki (France) Aravane Rezaï (Sweden) Stefan Edberg
Team Russia	(Russia) Vera Zvonareva (Russia) Maria Kirilenko (Russia) Yevgeny Kafelnikov

== Draw ==
Semifinals
Team Europe	4
Team Asia-Pacific	0
Team Russia	4
Team Americas	0

Gold Group Final
Team Europe	1
Team Russia	3
Silver Group Final
Team Asia-Pacific	2^{4}
Team Americas	2^{10}

=== Gold Froup Final: Team Europe vs. Team Russia ===
Venue : Centre Court, Victoria Park, Hong Kong
Surface : Outdoor Hardcourt

7−8 January
Stefan Edberg (Sweden)
Caroline Wozniacki (Denmark)
Aravane Rezaï (France) / Stefan Edberg (Sweden)

Team Europe	1–3	Team Russia
Score by game:
Aravane Rezaï (France)	3 – 6, 6 – 4, 3–6	(Russia) Maria Kirilenko
6 – 4, 6–0	(Russia) Yevgeny Kafelnikov
1 – 6, 0–6	(Russia) Vera Zvonareva
4 –6, 4–6	(Russia) Maria Kirilenko / (Russia) Yevgeny Kafelnikov

== See also ==
- Hong Kong Tennis Classic
