= Zheng Jie =

Chinese female tennis player (born 1983)

Zheng Jie 郑洁
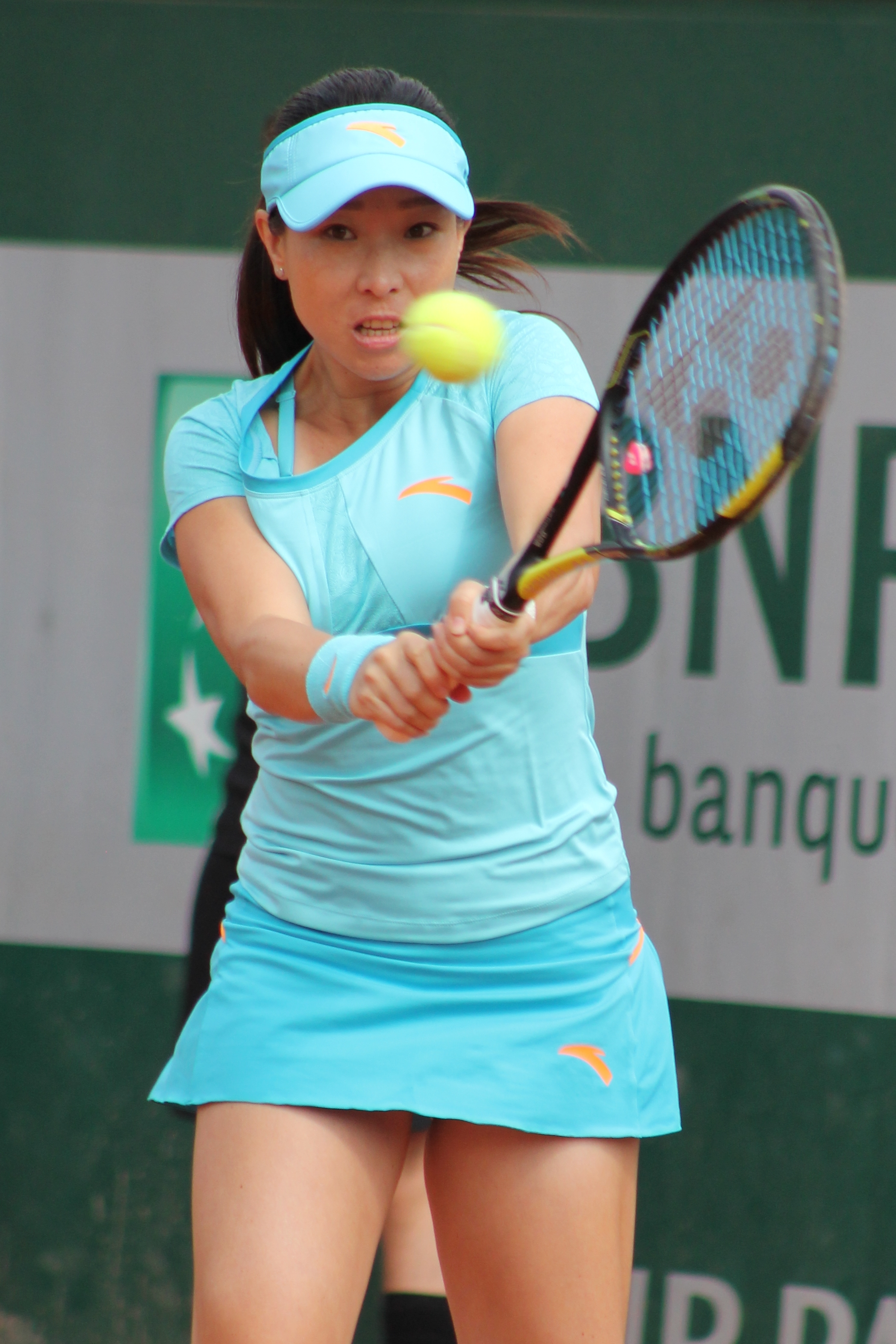
- Zheng at the 2015 French Open
- Country (sports): China
- Residence: Chengdu, Sichuan
- Born: 5 July 1983 (age 42) Chengdu
- Height: 1.64 m (5 ft 5 in)
- Turned pro: 16 January 2003
- Retired: 2015
- Plays: Right-handed (two-handed backhand)
- Prize money: $6,157,773

Singles
- Career record: 384–266
- Career titles: 4
- Highest ranking: No. 15 (18 May 2009)

Grand Slam singles results
- Australian Open: SF (2010)
- French Open: 4R (2004)
- Wimbledon: SF (2008)
- US Open: 3R (2008, 2009, 2012, 2013)

Doubles
- Career record: 437–213
- Career titles: 15
- Highest ranking: No. 3 (10 July 2006)

Grand Slam doubles results
- Australian Open: W (2006)
- French Open: SF (2006)
- Wimbledon: W (2006)
- US Open: SF (2010, 2013)

Grand Slam mixed doubles results
- Australian Open: SF (2014)
- French Open: SF (2008, 2015)
- Wimbledon: SF (2006)
- US Open: 1R (2012)

Team competitions
- Fed Cup: 22–9

Zheng Jie
- Simplified Chinese: 郑洁
- Traditional Chinese: 鄭潔
Transcriptions
Standard Mandarin
- Hanyu Pinyin: Zhèng Jié
- Wade–Giles: Cheng Chieh
- IPA: [tʂə̂ŋ tɕjɛ̌]

Zheng Jie (born 5 July 1983) is a Chinese former professional tennis player. In May 2009, she achieved a career-high singles ranking of world No. 15.

Zheng is one of China's most successful tennis players. She won four singles titles on the WTA Tour – Hobart in 2005, Estoril, Stockholm in 2006, and Auckland in 2012. She also won 15 career doubles titles, eleven of them with Yan Zi, including Wimbledon and the Australian Open in 2006. She won the bronze medal in doubles with Yan Zi at the 2008 Beijing Olympics. Her career-high doubles ranking is world No. 3. Zheng reached the singles semifinals at the 2008 Wimbledon Championships, where she defeated world No. 1, Ana Ivanovic, in the third round, and later went on to become the first Chinese player to advance to the semifinals at a major tournament. She also reached the semifinals of the 2010 Australian Open.

== Personal life ==
Zheng graduated from the Sichuan Sports Academy in June 2000.

At Wimbledon in 2008, she gained recognition when she became the first Chinese player ever to reach the semifinals of a Grand Slam singles tournament, defeating then-world No. 1, Ana Ivanovic, en route. She donated her winnings to the victims of the 2008 Sichuan earthquake in her native province.

Zheng was coached by Jiang Hong Wei, China's national women's team head coach, but she was later coached by her husband Zhang Yu who was also her hitting partner. They became close during the period after her severe ankle injury. Zheng is on the advisory staff of Yonex and uses their rackets. She was wearing clothing by Anta and appeared in their advertising campaigns, and she is a Rolex testimonee together with Roger Federer and Ana Ivanovic.

Zheng started playing tennis when she was ten, after she had seen her older sister play and thought tennis would be good exercise. At first, it was just for exercise. Zheng was rather small (at 5', 4.5"), and she and her parents were afraid that she would not have a career in the tennis world. (In fact, she was called "xiao bu dier" by her parents, which translates into something along the lines of "small kid." Her stature was no surprise though, for both her parents were short.) They considered her focusing more on her studies, so that if she did not make it in tennis she would be able to get a different job. However, her foreign coach saw potential in her, and told her parents and her something along the lines of, "There are many people in China who read books, but there are few who are national heroes." After that, her parents agreed to allow her to pursue tennis as a profession.

Nearly a year after the Sichuan earthquake that shook her home province, she visited there and brought with her tennis balls and rackets to distribute to the children there.

Zheng keeps in a small vial pieces of her ankle bone that were removed during the ankle surgery of 2007. She says, she keeps it because it is a part of her, and that it makes her cherish being able to play tennis again and life in general. She says that although it made her world ranking plunge, it also made her grow up a lot.

In 2009, Zheng separated from the Chinese Tennis Association (CTA). She talked about how it protected her in times of injury and when she was not playing well, for the CTA would back her completely and give her medical support. Now she manages her own money, which puts her at risk but also means that successes will be more profitable.

In April 2016, Zheng announced on social media that she had given birth to her first child.

== Career overview ==
=== 2002 ===
In May 2002, she won two successive $25k singles tournaments, at Shanghai and Tianjin, right after reaching her first $50k tournament quarterfinal, at Fukuoka, Japan. That September, she gained direct entry into a WTA Tour event in Shanghai and reached round two, before losing to Anna Kournikova. She ended the year as world No. 183.

=== 2003 ===
In 2003, she qualified for Hyderabad and took a love set against Mary Pierce in the main-draw first round, only to lose the match in three sets. She also qualified for Doha, but then lost to Lina Krasnoroutskaya.

Later in the year, she defeated Nuria Llagostera Vives in the first round of a $25k tournament, Alona Bondarenko in the first round of qualifying for Palermo, and Maria Elena Camerin at another $50k event in July, where she reached the quarterfinal; but it was in August at the Bronx that she won her first $50k title, beating Shenay Perry, Jamea Jackson, Akiko Morigami, Adriana Serra Zanetti and (in the final) Maria Kirilenko to this end.

Although Kirilenko avenged this defeat in qualifying at the US Open, Zheng proceeded to qualify for Bali in September with victories over Yan Zi and Yuka Yoshida. She then defeated Flavia Pennetta in the first round of the main draw, before bowing out to Tamarine Tanasugarn.

However, the very next month she defeated Tanasugarn at the Japan Open, where she reached her first tour semifinal, before losing to Maria Sharapova.

At the end of October, she reached another WTA Tour quarterfinal at Quebec City with a second-round win over Antonella Serra Zanetti, before losing in three sets to Laura Granville.

In December, she finished runner-up at two successive $50k tournaments, falling in three sets to countrywoman Peng Shuai at Changsha (after victories over Sesil Karatantcheva, Camille Pin and Aiko Nakamura) and, also in three sets, to the same Sesil Karatantcheva (after beating Sun Tiantian in the semifinal) at Shenzhen. Consequently, Zheng broke into the world top 100, with a year-end ranking of 93.

=== 2004 ===
The following year brought further improvements in her singles results. She reached the quarterfinals at Hyderabad and Doha (where she comfortably beat Jelena Dokić in round 2), and the second round at Miami and Vienna (where she beat Lisa Raymond). Then at the French Open, playing only her second Grand Slam singles main draw (after gaining direct entry to the Australian Open but losing in the first round), she defeated Dally Randriantefy, Émilie Loit, and Tathiana Garbin in succession to reach the fourth round, where she lost to Paola Suárez. She was the first Chinese woman to reach the fourth round of a major event.

At the Summer Olympics in Athens, she lost her first-round match to Ai Sugiyama. In September, she won a $25k tournament at Beijing, defeating Yan Zi in the semifinal and Li Na in the final. She later made it to the finals in a $50k tournament in Shenzhen, before losing to Peng Shuai. Zheng ended the year world-ranked 67.

=== 2005 ===
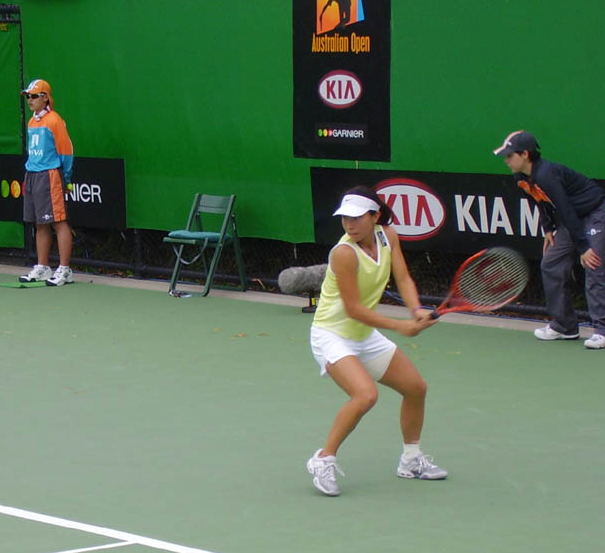
Zheng Jie at the 2005 Australian Open

Zheng started 2005 by capturing her first WTA Tour singles title at Hobart, after wins over Mariana Díaz Oliva, Shinobu Asagoe, Klára Koukalová, Li Na and Gisela Dulko.

She qualified for Dubai with wins over Sandra Kleinová, Maria Elena Camerin and Virginia Ruano Pascual, and went on to defeat Anabel Medina Garrigues in the main draw, before succumbing to Lindsay Davenport. Dulko gained her revenge in the quarterfinal at Estoril in April.

But Zheng remained in fine form, and reached her second WTA Tour final at Rabat, Morocco in May, losing to Nuria Llagostera Vives after wins over Catalina Castaño, Maureen Drake and Tathiana Garbin, followed by a walkover against Li Na who had to retire at 3–3 from an ankle sprain.

A three-set loss to Francesca Schiavone in the first round of the French Open prevented Zheng from defending her ranking points accrued there the previous year. In August, she reached the second round at Los Angeles by again beating Shinobu Asagoe, the Canadian Open quarterfinal (with wins over María Emilia Salerni and Ai Sugiyama), and another quarterfinal at New Haven (after defeating Katarina Srebotnik and Émilie Loit in qualifying, and Jamea Jackson in the main draw, though she was assisted by entering the tournament with a first-round bye and as a lucky loser in the final round of qualifying to Jelena Kostanić).

At the end of the month, she advanced to the second round at the US Open by defeating Iveta Benešová. Further first-round wins in September over María Vento-Kabchi (at Bali) and Jelena Janković (at Beijing) could not be consolidated on in subsequent rounds of the respective tournaments; but at Guangzhou, the last tournament she would play all year, she reached the semifinal with wins over Carly Gullickson, Jamea Jackson and Maria Kirilenko, before suffering her second loss of the year to Nuria Llagostera Vives. This string of results lifted her to a career-high world ranking of 42 in early October 2005.

=== 2006: Two major titles in doubles ===
2006 started poorly for Zheng in singles, with a string of six successive first-round losses dipping her ranking to world No. 56 by the end of February. However, after a first-round loss in Indian Wells, her 2006 singles breakthrough came at Key Biscayne where she reached the quarterfinals with wins over Nathalie Dechy and Anna-Lena Grönefeld before falling to Tatiana Golovin.

Zheng's newfound confidence earned a title at her next tournament in Estoril, where she defeated top-seeded Flavia Pennetta en route to the final before a victory over compatriot Li Na who was forced to retire at one set each. In Strasbourg, Zheng displayed yet reached the quarterfinals where she lost to second-seeded Nicole Vaidišová.

In August, Zheng won the tournament in Stockholm without dropping a set. In the final, she defeated the top seed and former world No. 2, Anastasia Myskina. A knee injury hampered Zheng's singles progress towards the end of 2006. Her US Open ended in a second round defeat by Anastasia Rodionova and her last competitive match of the season saw her worst loss in terms of rankings, where she fell in the second round of Zurich qualifying to world No. 139, Joanna Sacowicz of Poland.

However, in December, Zheng took part in the Asian Games in Doha. After a surprising first-round loss in the team event, she went into the singles competition as the second seed. She ended up winning the gold medal, with victories over Shikha Uberoi, Chan Yung-jan, Aiko Nakamura, and Sania Mirza. She also took gold in doubles with partner Yan Zi, defeating Chan Yung-jan and Chuang Chia-jung of Taiwan. To end 2006, Zheng won the Chinese National Championships, with a three-set victory over her doubles partner in the final.

=== 2007 ===
Season started well when Zheng reached a second Hobart quarterfinal, before losing to eventual champion Anna Chakvetadze.

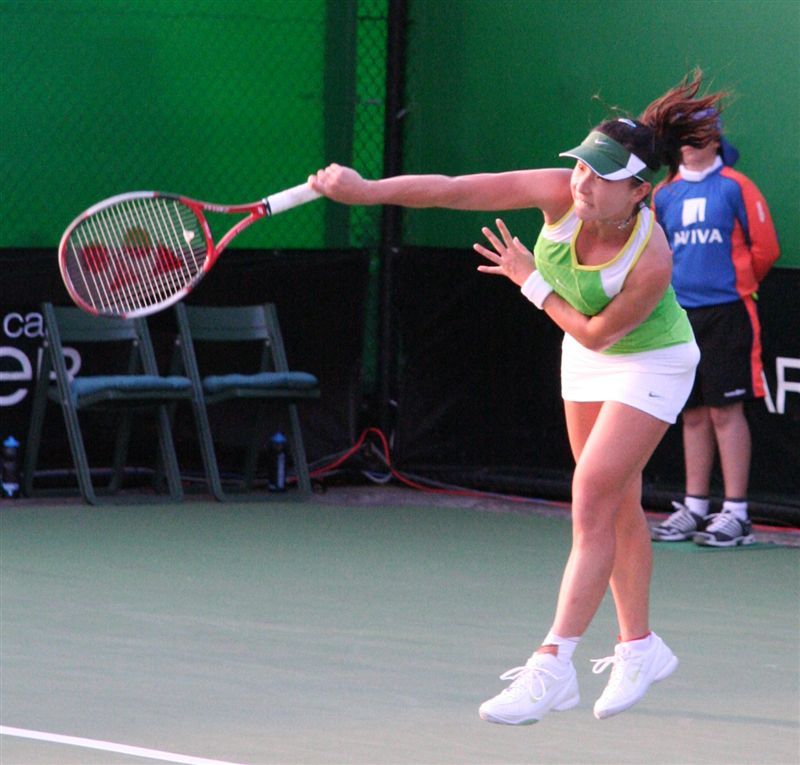
Zheng at the 2007 Australian Open

At the Australian Open, Zheng put in an extremely disappointing performance, losing to then 97th ranked Julia Schruff of Germany, after holding match point on more than one occasion. In doubles, her title defense with Yan Zi ended in the semifinals with a defeat by Chan Yung-jan and Chuang Chia-jung – the same partnership which they managed to defeat in the final of the Doha Asian Games just one month previously.

Zheng competed in both the singles and doubles (with Yan Zi) of the French Open. At the beginning of the tournament, she sustained an ankle injury, hampering her performance. She was knocked out in the first round of the singles competition by Timea Bacsinszky, and also lost in the first round in the doubles portion.

The ankle injury sustained at the French Open ruled her out of Wimbledon Championships to defend her doubles title. She withdrew from all events for the rest of the year because of the ankle injury. Her ranking suffered as a result, ending the year ranked world No. 163.

=== 2008: Wimbledon semifinal ===
Zheng's return to the tour was successful; in singles, she won two qualifying matches in Gold Coast before losing to Alisa Kleybanova. In doubles, she and Yan Zi reached the final, only to lose to the third seeds, Safina and Szávay. However, in Sydney, the duo won the title, beating second seeds Sugiyama and Srebotnik and reigning US Open champions Dechy and Safina along the way. At the Australian Open, the duo made it to the seminfinals, beating the Williams sisters along the way, before losing to the 12th seeds Peer and Azarenka.

Zheng qualified for the main draw of the French Open and then reached the third round, before losing to Dinara Safina.

Her breakthrough in women's tennis occurred at Wimbledon. Only being ranked world No. 133, Zheng was given a wildcard into the main draw. In the third round, she defeated world No. 1, Ana Ivanovic. This was her first victory against a top-10 player. Zheng then beat Ágnes Szávay of Hungary, the 15th seed, in the fourth round, and 18th-seeded Nicole Vaidišová in the quarterfinals. This made Zheng the first female Chinese tennis player ever to reach the singles semifinals of a major tournament. She also became the first wildcard to reach the semifinals of the women's singles at Wimbledon. In the semifinals, Zheng lost to two-time Wimbledon champion and former world No. 1, Serena Williams. Zheng's strong Wimbledon performance elevated her ranking to No. 40.

She donated her prize money from the tournament and spent time helping the victims and post-reconstruction effort of the 12 May earthquake that killed nearly 70,000 people and left five to ten million homeless in her home province Sichuan. She did the same with her French Open prize money earlier in the year.

In August 2008, Zheng competed for China in both singles and doubles at the Beijing Olympics. In the singles portion, Zheng made it to the third round, before losing to sixth-seeded Dinara Safina of Russia, who eventually won the silver medal. Zheng had better results in doubles with her partner Yan Zi. Seeded eighth, they won the bronze medal match against the Ukrainian sisters team of Alona and Kateryna Bondarenko, after losing in the semifinals to the fourth-seeded Spanish team of Medina Garrigues and Ruano Pascual. This was the second Olympic tennis medal ever won by China.

After the Olympics, Zheng entered the US Open. She advanced to the third round, losing there a tight match to second-seeded Jelena Janković.

She then was seeded third in the Tier III Guangzhou International held in September and made it to the semifinals, before losing to top-seeded Vera Zvonareva.

Ranked world No. 30, Zheng returned in September to Beijing for the China Open Tier-II tournament. She advanced to the semifinals, before losing to world No. 7 and fourth-seeded Svetlana Kuznetsova. Based on her strong China Open performance, Zheng became Asia's highest ranked women's singles player at world No. 26, her highest to-date career WTA singles ranking. Later, on 20 October, she reached world No. 23.

In March 2009, Zheng was awarded the WTA Tour "Comeback of the Year" award for 2008, as she rebounded from an injury-marred 2007.

=== 2009 ===
In January at the Australian Open, Zheng was seeded 22nd in women's singles. She advanced to the round of 16 and faced eighth seed Svetlana Kuznetsova. Zheng trailed 1–4 in the opening set, but was forced to retire with a left wrist injury after hitting the court while reaching for a ball. This was the furthest that she progressed at women's singles at this tournament in her career. In the doubles event, she and her partner Yan Zi were eliminated in the third round by Nuria Llagostera Vives and María José Martínez Sánchez.

Zheng returned to at the Dubai Championships and made it to the third round, before losing to world No. 1, Serena Williams. She and her partner Yan Zi lost in the first round in doubles to the Bondarenko sisters. Seeded fourth at the Monterrey Open, she made it to the semifinals losing to second seed Marion Bartoli. After this result, she created her highest world ranking of No. 17 at that time. Zheng was seeded 17th at the Sony Ericsson Open. She advanced to the round of 16, before losing to Serena Williams in three sets. Zheng's strong performance helped her to reach world No. 16, the highest ranking ever by a Chinese tennis player (Li Na had also reached world No. 16 in 2007).

At the Italian Open, Zheng lost to world No. 1, Dinara Safina, in three sets. At the Madrid Open, Zheng fell to Amélie Mauresmo in the second round. Despite the loss, on 18 May, Zheng became the highest-ranked Chinese player in history, at No. 15. At the French Open, Zheng (seeded 15th) progressed to the second round before losing Michelle Larcher de Brito in straight sets. At the Birmingham Classic, the first tournament on grass, Zheng was the top seed but lost to the eventual champion Magdaléna Rybáriková in the third round. Next at the Eastbourne International, Zheng advanced to the second round, before losing to Canadian Aleksandra Wozniak.

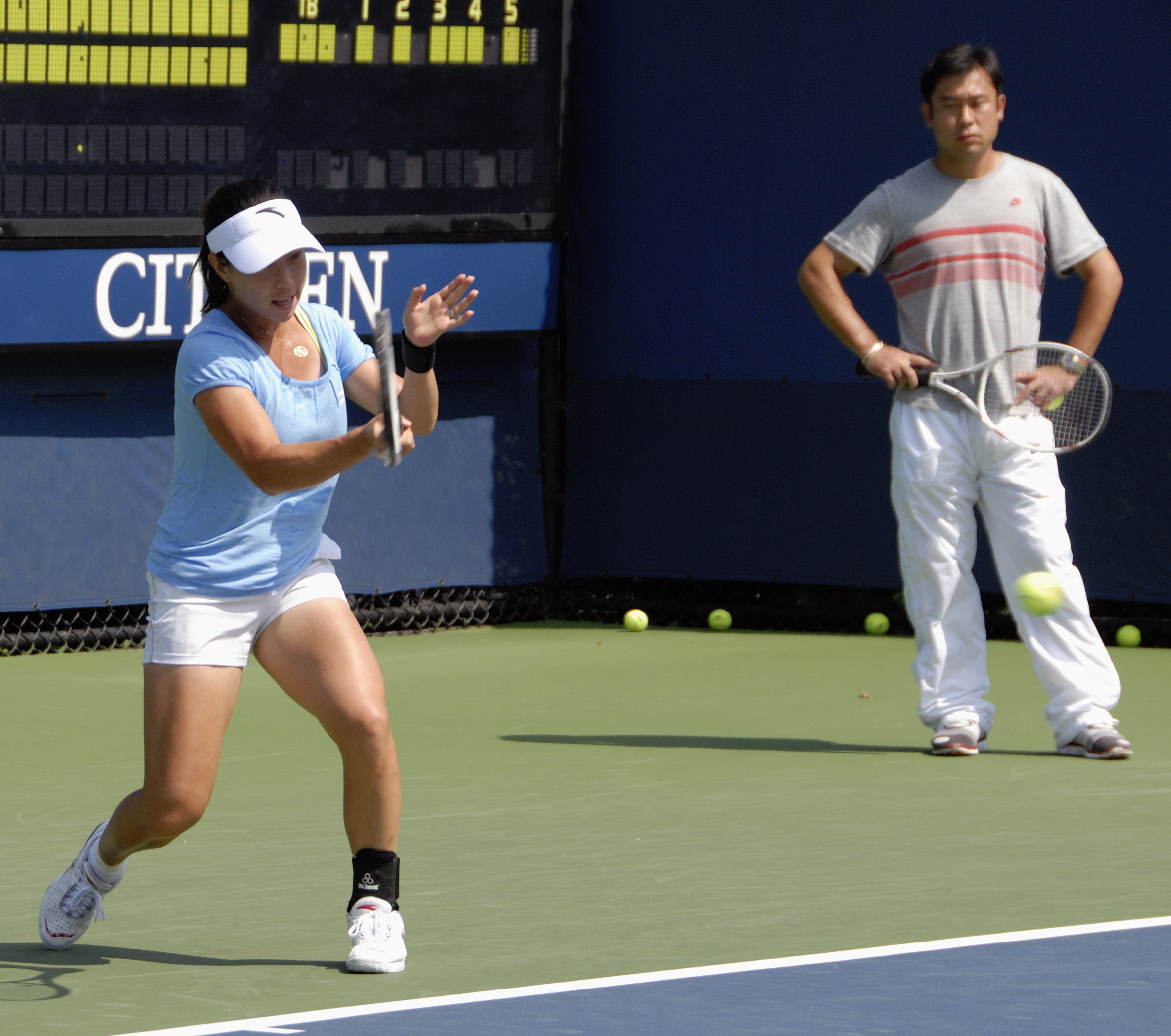
Zheng Jie at the 2009 US Open

Seeded 16th at Wimbledon, Zheng was upset in the second round by Daniela Hantuchová, in straight sets. As she was a semifinalist the previous year, her ranking fell to world No. 24. Zheng's next tournament was the LA Championships as part of her US Open Series campaign. She advanced to the fourth round, before losing to 13th seeded Samantha Stosur in three sets. At the Toronto, Zheng advanced to the third round before losing to Lucie Šafářová. At the US Open, Zheng, who was seeded 21, reached the third round, before losing in straight sets to the No. 13 seed, Nadia Petrova. Zheng ended the year with a 28–22 singles record and she finished the year ranked world No. 36.

=== 2010: Australian Open semifinal ===
Zheng began her season at the Hobart International, where she made it to the quarterfinals, before losing to the eventual tournament champion Alona Bondarenko. Zheng was unseeded at the Australian Open. After three-set wins over Peng Shuai, María José Martínez Sánchez and Marion Bartoli, as well as a straight sets fourth-round win over Alona Bondarenko, Zheng made Australian open history by becoming the first Chinese player to reach an Australian Open semifinal when she took out unseeded Maria Kirilenko in the quarterfinals. In the semifinal match, she lost to former world No. 1 and 2004 champion, Justine Henin. Zheng next competed at Dubai as the 16th seed, but was upset in the first round by Alicia Molik in three sets. Competing at the first-ever Malaysian Open, Zheng reached the second round as the third seed, where she was defeated by Chang Kai-chen. However, Zheng won the doubles title at the event with Chan Yung-jan, defeating Anastasia and Arina Rodionova in a championship tie-break.

Zheng next competed at the Indian Wells Open, where she was seeded 18th. She advanced to the quarterfinals, before losing to No. 2 seed Caroline Wozniacki. In doubles, Zheng and Chan reached the semifinalst. At the Miami Open, Zheng lost in her second-round match to Virginie Razzano. She and doubles partner Chan reached the semifinals. Zheng was seeded fifth at the Warsaw Open, where she reached the final losing to the defending champion, Alexandra Dulgheru. She also advanced to the semifinals of the doubles event of the tournament.

At the French Open, Zheng was seeded 26th and reached the second round, before losing to Anastasia Pivovarova. Zheng began her grass-court season at Eastbourne, where she was unseeded. She lost in the second round to British wildcard Elena Baltacha. At Wimbledon, she was the 23rd seed and lost in the second round to Petra Kvitová, who herself made it to the semifinals.

At the Stanford Classic, Zheng she was defeated by Maria Sharapova in the first round. In doubles, she reached the final and lost in close three sets to Liezel Huber and Lindsay Davenport. At her next tournament in San Diego, Zheng reached the second round before losing to Daniela Hantuchová. In consolation, Zheng partnered with Maria Kirilenko to win her second doubles title of the year, defeating second seeded Lisa Raymond and Rennae Stubbs in the final. Her next singles tournament was the Western & Southern Open, where Zheng lost to the 11th-seed Flavia Pennetta in the first round. In doubles, Jie teamed with Chan Yung-jan and made it to the quarterfinals. Next playing at the Rogers Cup, Zheng reached the quarterfinals but lost to Svetlana Kuznetsova, in straight sets.

She next competed at the US Open in singles and doubles. In singles, Zheng was the 21st seed. However, she was upset in the second round by a resurgent Ana Ivanovic. In doubles, she and Chan reached the semifinals before losing to Nadia Petrova and Liezel Huber. Following the tournament, Zheng withdrew from all scheduled tournaments citing a wrist injury, which kept her off of the tour until February 2011.

=== 2011 ===
Zheng was scheduled to compete at the Hong Kong Classic exhibition tournament in Team Asia-Pacific alongside Li Na and Mark Philippoussis, as well as competing as the third seed at the Hobart International. Zheng hadn't rehabilitated from her wrist injury sufficiently, and withdrew from both tournaments, as well as the Australian Open, where she was a semifinalist in 2010.

Jie made a return to the tour at the Pattaya Open in Thailand. She was seeded seventh but was defeated by Akgul Amanmuradova in the first round, in two sets.

Zheng next competed at the Dubai Championships. In the first round, she defeated Kristina Barrois in three sets. In the second, she was defeated by Patty Schnyder. At the Qatar Ladies Open, Zheng lost to Flavia Pennetta in straight sets. Zheng next played at the Indian Wells Open, where she was a quarterfinalist in 2010. She continued her string of losses, falling 3–6, 2–6 to Sofia Arvidsson.

At Miami, she won a tough three-setter over Sorana Cîrstea. She lost to her next opponent, the fourth seed and world No. 4, Samantha Stosur, 2–6, 1–6. Her next event was the Family Circle Cup in Charleston. In the first round, Zheng defeated qualifier Monica Puig in a match lasting over three hours. In the next round, she faced seeded Yanina Wickmayer for the first time, losing 4–6, 0–6.

Zheng then competed at the Estoril Open as the seventh seed. Her first-round opponent was Italian Romina Oprandi, who won the match in straight sets.

Zheng then played in a qualification tournament for the first time since 2008 at the Italian Open, as the second seed. She lost in the second round of qualifying to Anastasia Rodionova 6–3, 2–6, 5–7. However, she reached the main draw as a lucky loser, but lost to the wildcard Alberta Brianti in two sets. Next playing in Brussels, Zheng lost to Ayumi Morita in the first round in three sets; after losing her points from reaching the finals of Warsaw from the previous year, Zheng dropped from world No. 47 to No. 80, her lowest ranking since 2008.

At French Open, she defeated Sandra Záhlavová in the first round. In the second round, Zheng lost to ninth-seeded Petra Kvitová. She partnered Peng Shuai in doubles, losing in the second round.

Zheng then participated in three grass-court tournaments. Firstly at Birmingham, she lost to Yaroslava Shvedova in a tight first round contest. Zheng then played at Eastbourne, qualifying for the main draw by beating Ayumi Morita, Edina Gallovits-Hall, and finally Melanie Oudin. She lost in the first round of the main draw, 4–6, 4–6, to Daniela Hantuchová. At Wimbledon, Zheng reached the second round for the third consecutive year, beating Zuzana Ondrášková, before losing in disappointing fashion to Japanese qualifier Misaki Doi, 3–6, 1–6. In doubles, Zheng and Peng reached the quarterfinals, losing a tight three-set match to eventual champions Květa Peschke and Katarina Srebotnik.

Zheng began her campaign at the US Open Series at the Washington Open, however she was beaten in the first round by Jill Craybas in three sets. Zheng next made the third round of the San Diego Open, beating Mirjana Lučić in three sets in the first round, and seeded Roberta Vinci 6–4, 6–2 in the second. In the third, she lost to Daniela Hantuchová. Zheng next entered the qualification tournament for the Rogers Cup. In the first qualification round, she defeated Stéphanie Foretz Gacon in a close three-setter. In the next qualification round, Zheng faced Japanese veteran Kimiko Date-Krumm for the first time, and by winning that match in three sets, she qualified for the main draw. In the first round of the main draw, Zheng waltzed past fellow qualifier Alberta Brianti 6–2, 6–1, setting up a second-round match with second seed Kim Clijsters. In the second round, she lost the first set 3–6, however, she proceeded to the third round because Clijsters retired at 2–1 down in the second set due to an abdominal injury. In the third round, Zheng contested a close match with Serena Williams, but eventually lost in three sets. After a strong performance, Zheng leaped from world No. 82 to No. 65.

Following on from Toronto, she entered the qualification tournament for the Western & Southern Open in Cincinnati; as the 24th seed, Zheng overcame CoCo Vandeweghe in the first qualification round, setting up a match with twelfth seed Johanna Larsson, who she overwhelmed 6–1, 6–2 to qualify for the main draw. In the first round she faced Julia Görges, and won that match 6–2, 1–6, 6–4. In the second round, she lost to Jelena Janković in three sets. At the US Open, Zheng overcame Vitalia Diatchenko in the first round before losing in three sets to Andrea Petkovic.

Zheng played a tournament in her native China for the first time in two years at the Guangzhou International Open, where she was unseeded. She defeated sixth seeded Alberta Brianti, Noppawan Lertcheewakarn and fourth seeded Petra Martić before losing to Magdaléna Rybáriková in the semifinals. She played next at the Pan Pacific Open in Japan, where she fell to qualifier CoCo Vandeweghe after a tough three-setter in the first round.

Zheng received a wildcard into the China Open. In the first round she beat Alberta Brianti, although Brianti was leading 4–0 in the deciding set. In the second round she lost to Agnieszka Radwańska 1–6, 4–6.

Zheng played her final event of the season at the Osaka Open. She amazingly won her first match versus Zuzana Kučová 6–1, 6–1 and after that she beat fifth-seeded Australian Jarmila Gajdošová to reach the quarterfinals, which had to be postponed because of rain. After a one-day delay, Zheng beat Petra Cetkovská 0–6, 7–5, 6–3. Zheng later lost to top-seeded Samantha Stosur in the semifinals, in three sets. By virtue of this performance, Zheng entered the top 50, ending the season ranked world No. 48.

Zheng then played an ITF tournament in Taipei as the top seed, but lost in the second round to Yaraslava Shvedova, 2–6, 2–6.

=== 2012 ===
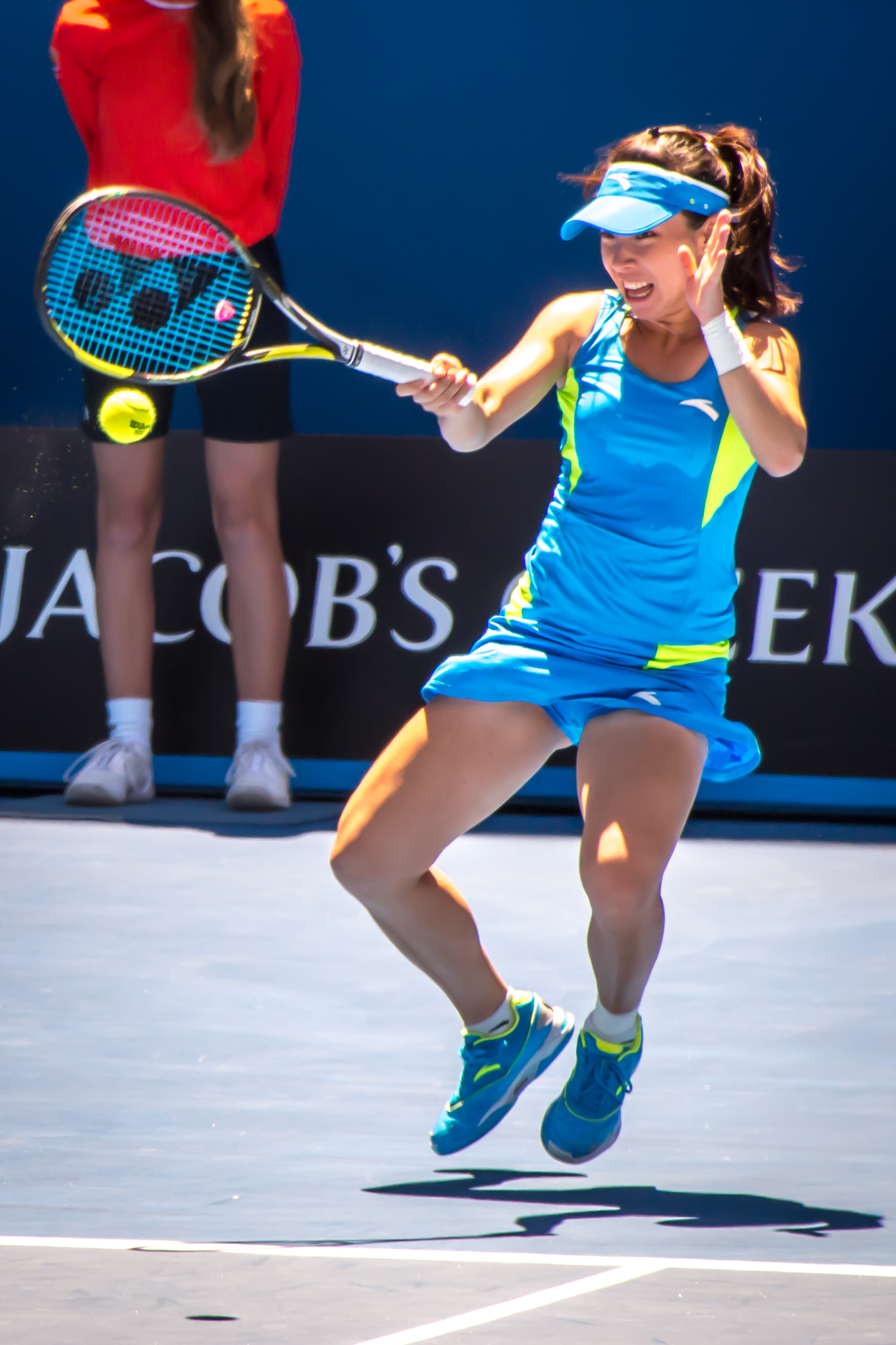
Zheng at the 2014 Australian Open

At the beginning of the 2012 season, Zheng switched her racquet to the new Yonex EZONE Xi 98 model.

She began the season by winning the Auckland Open, her first WTA singles title since 2006. The unseeded Zheng defeated Ayumi Morita in the first round before upsetting eighth seed Monica Niculescu in the second, 6–0, 6–2. In the quarterfinals, Zheng beat Lucie Hradecká 6–2, 6–3, and third seed Svetlana Kuznetsova 2–6, 6–3, 6–3 in the semifinals. In the final, Zheng defeated fourth seed Flavia Pennetta as the Italian retired due to injury in the third set.

She was scheduled to play at the Hobart International but withdrew due to a right thigh injury. At the Australian Open, Zheng reached the fourth round, where she was beaten by Sara Errani, with straight sets wins over Madison Keys, Roberta Vinci and top-10 ranked Marion Bartoli.

She had a disappointing run of results following the Australian Open, failing to win a match until the Indian Wells Open where she handily defeated Michaëlla Krajicek having received a first-round bye. In the third round, Zheng lost to Li Na, 1–6, 3–6. Zheng then reached the third round at the Miami Open, beating Hradecká and Angelique Kerber in straight sets, before losing to Dominika Cibulková, 2–6, 0–6.

The clay-court season she began as the fifth seed in Estoril. In the first round, she defeated Ekaterina Makarova 6–3, 6–1, but lost in the second to Galina Voskoboeva. Zheng then lost in the first round of Madrid, Rome and Brussels to Maria Kirilenko, Anabel Medina Garrigues and Arantxa Rus, respectively. At the French Open, Zheng was seeded 31st, and lost in the second round to Aleksandra Wozniak.

She chose to begin the grass-court season in Birmingham, however as she registered late she was forced to qualify for the main draw, which she did by beating both Natalie Grandin and Sandra Zaniewska. Zheng won three matches to reach the quarter-finals, where she defeated fourth-seeded Roberta Vinci in a three set match hampered by multiple rain delays. In the semifinals Zheng lost to Jelena Janković in three sets.

At Wimbledon, Zheng entered both ladies' singles (seeded 25th) and ladies' doubles, partnering with compatriot Peng Shuai (unseeded). In the first round singles, she defeated unseeded Canadian Stéphanie Dubois. In round two, Zheng avenged her French Open defeat by Wozniak, another unseeded Canadian, in straight sets. In the third round, Zheng lost 7–6, 2–6, 7–9 to Serena Williams who hit a Wimbledon record of 23 aces. In the first-round doubles, Zheng and Peng lost to Marina Erakovic and Tamarine Tanasugarn, 2–6, 2–6.

At the US Open, Zheng lost in the third round to world No. 1, Victoria Azarenka, 0–6, 1–6. In doubles, Zheng decided to partner with Katarina Srebotnik, however, they lost in the first round.

Following the US Open, Zheng competed in the Asian Swing. Zheng was the second seed in Guangzhou, but lost in the second round to Laura Robson. In Tokyo, Zheng was crushed by Dominika Cibulková 6–0, 6–3 in the second round, while in Beijing Zheng was upset in the first round by Lara Arruabarrena Vecino. Seeded second in Osaka, she lost to Pauline Parmentier in the second round.

Zheng qualified for the Tournament of Champions as a result of the withdrawal of Venus Williams. In the round-robin section of the tournament, Zheng was grouped with Nadia Petrova, Maria Kirilenko and Tsvetana Pironkova. Zheng lost her matches to Petrova and Pironkova, and retired while down in the first set against Sofia Arvidsson, Kirilenko's replacement. Zheng ended the year ranked No. 26.

=== 2013 ===
Her year began in Auckland in a bid to defend her title at Auckland. Despite being seeded fourth, Zheng lost in the first round in straight sets to Jamie Hampton. Zheng rebounded in Sydney by defeating sixth-seeded Sam Stosur in three sets. In the second round, she lost to Madison Keys, a qualifier ranked 135, 0–6, 4–6. At the Australian Open, Zheng reached the third round after another win over Stosur, but she then lost in three sets to Germany's Julia Görges.

Following the Australian Open, Zheng struggled with poor results, losing early in Doha, Indian Wells and Miami, resulting in her falling from the top 50. Zheng began the clay-court season with early losses in Madrid and Rome, to Svetlana Kuznetsova and Li Na respectively. Zheng's fortunes changed at the Brussels Open, where she defeated Caroline Wozniacki before losing in the quarterfinals to Romina Oprandi. At the French Open, Zheng reached the third round for the first time since 2008, but lost to Maria Sharapova in straight sets.

Zheng did not play any warm-up events during the grass-court season, instead electing to play her first match on the surface at Wimbledon, where she lost in the first round to Caroline Garcia. This was Zheng's first loss in the first round of a Grand Slam tournament since 2007.

At the US Open, in the second round, Zheng played in what would become one of the longest US Open women's matches in history lasting more than three hours. She wore down Venus Williams with powerful returns and impressive endurance, eventually winning a third-set tiebreaker to take the match, but she then lost to Carla Suárez Navarro in the third round.

=== 2014 ===
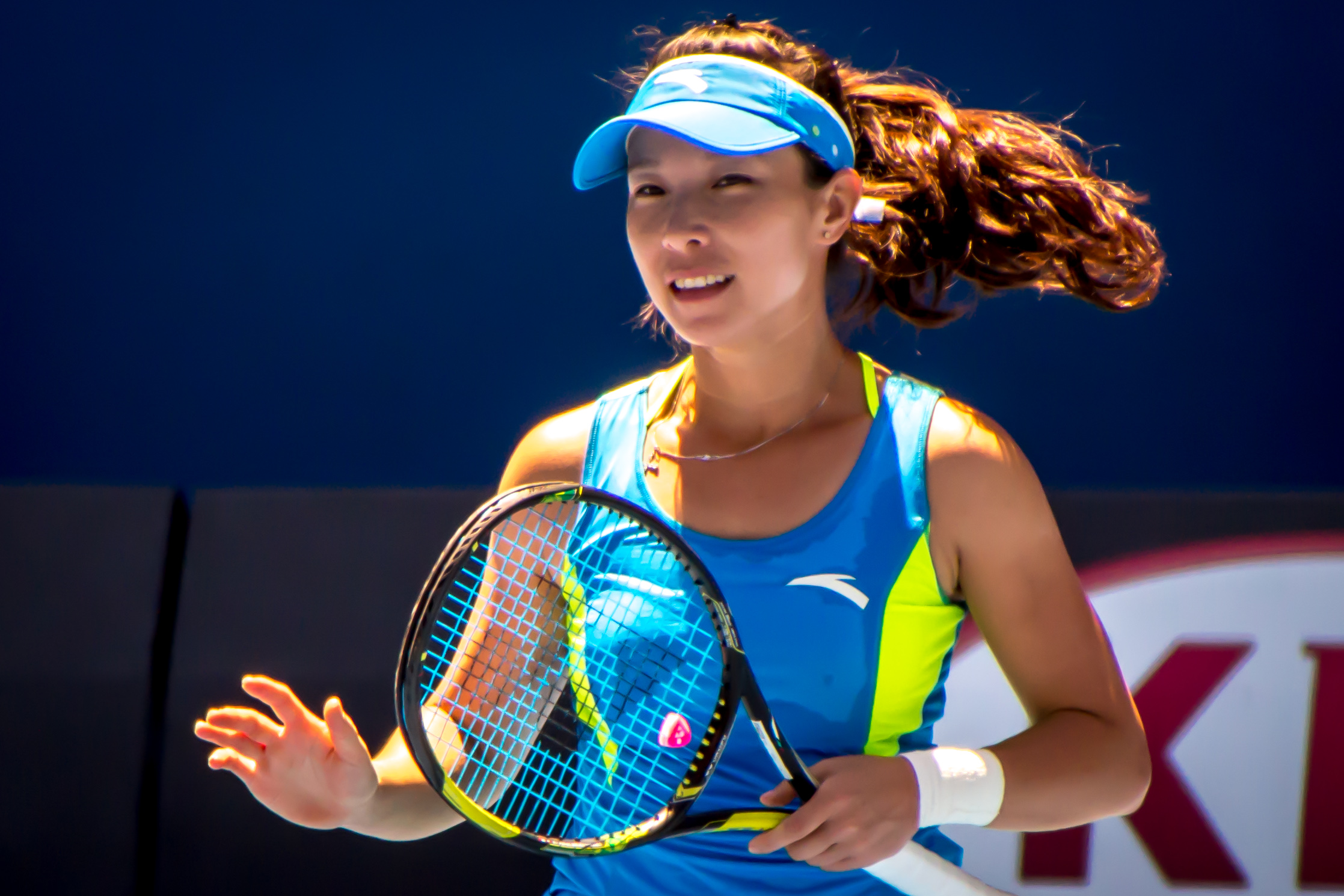
Zheng in Melbourne, 2014

Zheng started the year by losing early in Shenzhen and Hobart. However, she reached the third round at the Australian Open, defeating 12th-seeded Roberta Vinci and Madison Keys before losing to Casey Dellacqua. This was then followed by a string of poor results, culminating in a first-round loss to Anna Karolina Schmiedlova at the French Open.

Zheng's fortunes improved during the grass-court season. Despite losing in the first round at Birmingham, Zheng then reached of the final of the Rosmalen Open where she was defeated by CoCo Vandeweghe. Zheng defeated Annika Beck in the first round of the Wimbledon Championships but was then beaten by 11th seed Ana Ivanovic.

She played just five tournaments after Wimbledon, highlighted by a first-round loss to Peng Shuai at the US Open and a quarterfinal run in Hong Kong.

=== 2015: Australian Open doubles final and retirement ===
Zheng played just one singles match in 2015, a first-round loss at the Australian Open to Chang Kai-chen. However, at the same tournament, she and her partner Chan Yung-jan reached the finals of the women's doubles event, where they were defeated by Bethanie Mattek-Sands and Lucie Šafářová in straight sets. Zheng played six further doubles events in 2015, losing in the third round of the French Open, the final at Eastbourne and the first round at Wimbledon.

Zheng has not participated in any professional tennis matches since the 2015 Wimbledon Championships and, as a result, no longer holds a WTA ranking in singles or doubles.

== Career statistics ==
=== Grand Slam performance timelines ===
Key
W	F	SF	QF	#R	RR	Q#	P#	DNQ	A	Z#	PO	G	S	B	NMS	NTI	P	NH

(W) winner; (F) finalist; (SF) semifinalist; (QF) quarterfinalist; (#R) rounds 4, 3, 2, 1; (RR) round-robin stage; (Q#) qualification round; (P#) preliminary round; (DNQ) did not qualify; (A) absent; (Z#) Davis/Fed Cup Zonal Group (with number indication) or (PO) play-off; (G) gold, (S) silver or (B) bronze Olympic/Paralympic medal; (NMS) not a Masters tournament; (NTI) not a Tier I tournament; (P) postponed; (NH) not held; (SR) strike rate (events won / competed); (W–L) win–loss record.
To avoid confusion and double counting, these charts are updated at the conclusion of a tournament or when the player's participation has ended.

==== Singles ====
Tournament	2002	2003	2004	2005	2006	2007	2008	2009	2010	2011	2012	2013	2014	2015	SR	W–L
Australian Open	A	Q1	1R	1R	1R	1R	A	4R	SF	A	4R	3R	3R	1R	0 / 10	15–10
French Open	A	Q3	4R	1R	2R	1R	3R	2R	2R	2R	2R	3R	1R	A	0 / 11	12–11
Wimbledon	A	A	1R	A	3R	A	SF	2R	2R	2R	3R	1R	2R	A	0 / 9	13–9
US Open	Q2	Q2	1R	2R	2R	A	3R	3R	2R	2R	3R	3R	1R	A	0 / 10	12–10
Win–loss	0–0	0–0	3–4	1–3	4–4	0–2	9–3	7–4	8–4	3–3	8–4	6–4	3–4	0–1	0 / 40	52–40

==== Doubles ====
Tournament	2003	2004	2005	2006	2007	2008	2009	2010	2011	2012	2013	2014	2015	SR	W–L
Australian Open	A	QF	1R	W	SF	SF	3R	3R	A	3R	QF	1R	F	1 / 11	30–10
French Open	A	1R	3R	SF	1R	3R	QF	3R	2R	3R	3R	1R	3R	0 / 12	19–12
Wimbledon	A	3R	A	W	A	3R	3R	1R	QF	1R	3R	SF	1R	1 / 10	21–9
US Open	1R	2R	QF	QF	A	QF	QF	SF	1R	1R	SF	QF	A	0 / 11	24–11
Win–loss	0–1	6–4	5–3	19–2	4–2	11–4	10–4	7–4	4–3	4–4	10–4	7–4	7–3	2 / 44	94–42

==== Mixed doubles ====
Tournament	2006	2007	2008	2009	2010	2011	2012	2013	2014	2015	W–L
Australian Open	A	A	1R	A	A	A	A	A	SF	A	3–2
French Open	2R	A	SF	A	A	2R	A	A	1R	SF	8–5
Wimbledon	SF	A	A	A	A	A	QF	QF	1R	2R	7–5
US Open	A	A	A	A	A	A	1R	A	A	A	0–1
Win–loss	4–2	0–0	3–2	0–0	0–0	1–1	2–2	2–1	3–3	3–2	18–13

== Grand Slam tournament finals ==
=== Doubles: 3 (2 titles, 1 runner-up) ===
Result	Year	Championship	Surface	Partner	Opponents	Score
Win	2006	Australian Open	Hard	(China) Yan Zi	(United States) Lisa Raymond (Australia) Samantha Stosur	2–6, 7–6^{(9–7)}, 6–3
Win	2006	Wimbledon	Grass	(China) Yan Zi	(Spain) Virginia Ruano Pascual (Argentina) Paola Suárez	6–3, 3–6, 6–2
Loss	2015	Australian Open	Hard	(Chinese Taipei) Chan Yung-jan	(United States) Bethanie Mattek-Sands (Czech Republic) Lucie Šafářová	4–6, 6–7^{(5–7)}

== Other significant finals ==
=== Premier Mandatory/Premier 5 tournaments ===
==== Doubles: 5 (3 titles, 2 runner-ups) ====
Result	Year	Tournament	Surface	Partner	Opponents	Score
Win	2006	German Open	Clay	(China) Yan Zi	(Russia) Elena Dementieva (Italy) Flavia Pennetta	6–2, 6–3
Win	2007	Charleston Cup	Hard	(China) Yan Zi	(China) Peng Shuai (China) Sun Tiantian	7–5, 6–0
Loss	2008	Indian Wells Open	Hard	(China) Yan Zi	(Russia) Dinara Safina (Russia) Elena Vesnina	3–6, 1–6
Win	2011	Italian Open	Clay	(China) Peng Shuai	(United States) Vania King (Kazakhstan) Yaroslava Shvedova	6–2, 6–3
Loss	2012	Cincinnati Open	Hard	(Slovenia) Katarina Srebotnik	(Czech Republic) Andrea Hlaváčková (Czech Republic) Lucie Hradecká	1–6, 3–6

=== Olympic medal matches ===
==== Doubles: 1 (bronze medal) ====
Result	Year	Location	Surface	Partner	Opponents	Score
Bronze	2008	Beijing	Hard	(China) Yan Zi	(Ukraine) Alona Bondarenko (Ukraine) Kateryna Bondarenko	6–2, 6–2

== See also ==
- Chinese tennis players
- Tennis in China

Awards
Preceded by Lindsay Davenport	WTA Comeback Player of the Year; 2008	Succeeded by Kim Clijsters
