= 2010 Maria Sharapova tennis season =

- Full name: Maria Sharapova
- Country: Russia

Singles
- Season record: 33–11
- Calendar titles: 2
- Year-end ranking: No. 18
- Ranking change from previous year: ▼4

Grand Slam & significant results
- Australian Open: 1R
- French Open: 3R
- Wimbledon: 4R
- US Open: 4R
- Last updated on: 3 February 2013.

Results and statistics from Maria Sharapova's 2010 tennis season.

== Yearly summary ==
=== Australian Open series ===
Sharapova began her season at the Australian Open, as the 14th seed. She was knocked out in the first round by compatriot Maria Kirilenko in three sets; this marked Sharapova's worst performance at a Major tournament since she lost in the first round of the 2003 French Open, and the first time she lost a match at the tournament since her heavy defeat in the 2007 final to Serena Williams (she did not participate in 2009 due to injury).

=== North American season ===
Rather than participate at the two Middle East Premier tournaments in Doha and Dubai, Sharapova decided to instead compete at the Cellular South Cup in Memphis, as a means of attempting to regain her confidence following her first round defeat in Australia. As the top seed in the tournament, Sharapova won the tournament without dropping a set, defeating Shenay Perry, Bethanie Mattek-Sands, Elena Baltacha, Petra Kvitová and Sofia Arvidsson on her way to capturing her 21st career title.

Sharapova's next tournament was Indian Wells. After receiving a bye in the first round, and defeating compatriot Vera Dushevina in the second, Sharapova was upset in the third round by Zheng Jie of China in three sets. Following the defeat, Sharapova then withdrew from Miami citing an elbow injury. This was the third year in a row in which Sharapova was forced to miss the North American hard-court season concluder.

=== Clay court season ===
After a few weeks off the tour, Sharapova returned at the Madrid Open in May, but, as it was at the Australian Open earlier in the year, her tournament would be another short affair, as she fell in the first round to Lucie Šafářová. Following the early exit in Madrid, Sharapova then entered the Internationaux de Strasbourg as a wildcard entry and the top seed, where she would win her second title for the year, by defeating Kristina Barrois in the final.

Sharapova then competed at the French Open as the 11th seed. After routine straight sets victories over Ksenia Pervak and Kirsten Flipkens in the first two rounds, Sharapova lost in the third round to four-times champion Justine Henin, however, she would become the first player since Svetlana Kuznetsova in 2005 to win a set against the Belgian at the French Open. Sharapova was also the last player to be beaten by the Belgian at the tournament; Henin's victory was her 23rd (and last) consecutive match victory at the tournament.

=== Grass court season ===
Following the French Open, Sharapova started her preparations for Wimbledon by reaching the final of the Aegon Classic in Birmingham, where she was beaten by top seed Li Na after serving seven double faults in the match.

Sharapova was seeded 16th at Wimbledon. She defeated Anastasia Pivovarova, Ioana Raluca Olaru and Barbora Záhlavová-Strýcová in the first three rounds, all in straight sets, to set up a fourth round showdown against defending champion Serena Williams, in what would be their first meeting on grass since the 2004 Wimbledon final, and thus a rematch of the same final, which Sharapova won. However, there would be no repeat this time around, as Sharapova succumbed in straight sets, despite holding several set points in the first set. This marked her fifth straight defeat to Williams since the end of 2004, and the fourth consecutive year in which she would fail to reach the quarter-finals at Wimbledon.

Following her defeat at Wimbledon, Sharapova then visited her parents' hometown of Gomel, Belarus, to meet the victims of the Chernobyl accident, which occurred when Sharapova was conceived by her parents, who escaped the city as a result.

=== US Open series ===
After a month off the Tour, Sharapova returned to action at the Bank of the West Classic in Stanford. She defeated Zheng Jie, Olga Govortsova, Elena Dementieva and Agnieszka Radwańska en route to reaching her fourth final for the year, where she was defeated easily by emerging rival Victoria Azarenka. Sharapova then made her tournament debut at Cincinnati, where she defeated Svetlana Kuznetsova (who had just won the title in San Diego the previous week), Andrea Petkovic, Agnieszka Radwańska (for a second time in three weeks), Marion Bartoli (who had just defeated Caroline Wozniacki in the third round) and Anastasia Pavlyuchenkova (in three sets) to reach her fifth final of the year. There, she faced Kim Clijsters, the defending US Open champion. She came very close to winning the title, holding championship points in the second set before rain interrupted the match and Sharapova's momentum; this break allowed Clijsters to make a comeback and eventually win in three sets.

Sharapova's next tournament was the US Open, where she was seeded 16th. After defeating Jarmila Gajdošová, Iveta Benešová and Beatrice Capra in the first three rounds, Sharapova lost in the fourth round to top seed Caroline Wozniacki, in a match where she served nine double faults and committed 36 unforced errors. Her collective performances at the Majors in 2010 represented her worst performance at that level since 2003, the last year she failed to reach a single Major quarter-final until this year.

The victory over Capra, which preceded the loss to Wozniacki, marked Sharapova's 100th match victory at a Major tournament, and her first double bagel victory at the same level.

=== Asian hard court season ===
Sharapova's Asian hard court swing would turn out to be short-lived one; as the defending champion in Tokyo, Sharapova lost in the first round to Kimiko Date-Krumm in three sets, and in Beijing, she fell to compatriot Elena Vesnina in the second round. This meant that she lost three of her last four matches to finish the season, and thus failed to qualify for the year-end championships for the third year in succession. She had qualified for the alternate year-ending championships, the WTA Tournament of Champions in Bali, but chose not to participate.

Sharapova finished the season ranked World No. 18, only nine rankings points behind a resurgent Ana Ivanovic; this was her lowest year-end ranking since 2003.

== All matches ==
This table chronicles all the matches of Sharapova in 2010, including walkovers (W/O) which the WTA does not count as wins. They are marked ND for non-decision or no decision.

Key
W	F	SF	QF	#R	RR	Q#	P#	DNQ	A	Z#	PO	G	S	B	NMS	NTI	P	NH

(W) winner; (F) finalist; (SF) semifinalist; (QF) quarterfinalist; (#R) rounds 4, 3, 2, 1; (RR) round-robin stage; (Q#) qualification round; (P#) preliminary round; (DNQ) did not qualify; (A) absent; (Z#) Davis/Fed Cup Zonal Group (with number indication) or (PO) play-off; (G) gold, (S) silver or (B) bronze Olympic/Paralympic medal; (NMS) not a Masters tournament; (NTI) not a Tier I tournament; (P) postponed; (NH) not held; (SR) strike rate (events won / competed); (W–L) win–loss record.
To avoid confusion and double counting, these charts are updated at the conclusion of a tournament or when the player's participation has ended.

=== Singles matches ===
Tournament	#	Round	Opponent	Result	Score
Australian Open; Melbourne, Australia; Grand Slam; Hard, outdoor 18–31 January 2010	1	1R	(Russia) Maria Kirilenko	Loss	6–7^{(4–7)}, 6–3, 4–6
Cellular South Cup; Memphis, USA; WTA International; Hard, indoor 13–21 February 2010	2	1R	(United States) Shenay Perry	Win	6–0, 6–2
Cellular South Cup; Memphis, USA; WTA International; Hard, indoor 13–21 February 2010	3	2R	(United States) Bethanie Mattek-Sands	Win	6–1, 6–1
Cellular South Cup; Memphis, USA; WTA International; Hard, indoor 13–21 February 2010	4	QF	(United Kingdom) Elena Baltacha	Win	6–2, 7–5
Cellular South Cup; Memphis, USA; WTA International; Hard, indoor 13–21 February 2010	5	SF	(Czech Republic) Petra Kvitová	Win	6–4, 6–3
Cellular South Cup; Memphis, USA; WTA International; Hard, indoor 13–21 February 2010	6	W	(Sweden) Sofia Arvidsson	Win (1)	6–2, 6–1
BNP Paribas Open; Indian Wells, United States of America; WTA Premier Mandatory; Hard, outdoor 8–21 March 2010
BNP Paribas Open; Indian Wells, United States of America; WTA Premier Mandatory; Hard, outdoor 8–21 March 2010		1R	Bye		
BNP Paribas Open; Indian Wells, United States of America; WTA Premier Mandatory; Hard, outdoor 8–21 March 2010	7	2R	(Russia) Vera Dushevina	Win	4–6, 7–5, 6–2
BNP Paribas Open; Indian Wells, United States of America; WTA Premier Mandatory; Hard, outdoor 8–21 March 2010	8	3R	(China) Zheng Jie	Loss	3–6, 6–2, 3–6
Mutua Madrileña Madrid Open; Madrid, Spain; WTA Premier Mandatory; Clay, outdoor 10–16 May 2010	9	1R	(Czech Republic) Lucie Šafářová	Loss	4–6, 3–6
Internationaux de Strasbourg; Strasbourg, France; WTA International; Clay, outdoor 17–22 May 2010	10	1R	(Russia) Regina Kulikova	Win	6–3, 3–6, 6–1
Internationaux de Strasbourg; Strasbourg, France; WTA International; Clay, outdoor 17–22 May 2010	11	2R	(Bulgaria) Dia Evtimova	Win	6–3, 6–0
Internationaux de Strasbourg; Strasbourg, France; WTA International; Clay, outdoor 17–22 May 2010	12	QF	(Germany) Julia Görges	Win	7–6^{(7–2)}, 6–1
Internationaux de Strasbourg; Strasbourg, France; WTA International; Clay, outdoor 17–22 May 2010	13	SF	(Spain) Anabel Medina Garrigues	Win	4–6, 6–2, 6–2
Internationaux de Strasbourg; Strasbourg, France; WTA International; Clay, outdoor 17–22 May 2010	14	W	(Germany) Kristina Barrois	Win (2)	7–5, 6–1
French Open; Paris, France; Grand Slam; Clay, outdoor 23 May–6 June 2010	15	1R	(Russia) Ksenia Pervak	Win	6–3, 6–2
French Open; Paris, France; Grand Slam; Clay, outdoor 23 May–6 June 2010	16	2R	(Belgium) Kirsten Flipkens	Win	6–3, 6–3
French Open; Paris, France; Grand Slam; Clay, outdoor 23 May–6 June 2010	17	3R	(Belgium) Justine Henin	Loss	2–6, 6–3, 3–6
Aegon Classic; Birmingham, Great Britain; WTA International; Grass, outdoor 7–13 June 2010	18	1R	(United States) Bethanie Mattek-Sands	Win	6–0, 6–3
Aegon Classic; Birmingham, Great Britain; WTA International; Grass, outdoor 7–13 June 2010	19	2R	(Russia) Alla Kudryavtseva	Win	6–3, 6–1
Aegon Classic; Birmingham, Great Britain; WTA International; Grass, outdoor 7–13 June 2010	20	QF	(Bulgaria) Sesil Karatantcheva	Win	6–2, 6–4
Aegon Classic; Birmingham, Great Britain; WTA International; Grass, outdoor 7–13 June 2010	21	SF	(United States) Alison Riske	Win	6–2, 4–6, 6–1
Aegon Classic; Birmingham, Great Britain; WTA International; Grass, outdoor 7–13 June 2010	22	F	(China) Li Na	Loss (1)	5–7, 1–6
The Championships, Wimbledon; London, Great Britain; Grand Slam; Grass, outdoor 21 June–4 July 2010	23	1R	(Russia) Anastasia Pivovarova	Win	6–1, 6–0
The Championships, Wimbledon; London, Great Britain; Grand Slam; Grass, outdoor 21 June–4 July 2010	24	2R	(Romania) Ioana Raluca Olaru	Win	6–1, 6–4
The Championships, Wimbledon; London, Great Britain; Grand Slam; Grass, outdoor 21 June–4 July 2010	25	3R	(Czech Republic) Barbora Záhlavová-Strýcová	Win	7–5, 6–3
The Championships, Wimbledon; London, Great Britain; Grand Slam; Grass, outdoor 21 June–4 July 2010	26	4R	(United States) Serena Williams	Loss	6–7^{(9–11)}, 4–6
Bank of the West Classic; Stanford, United States of America; WTA Premier; Hard, outdoor 26 July–1 August 2010
Bank of the West Classic; Stanford, United States of America; WTA Premier; Hard, outdoor 26 July–1 August 2010	27	1R	(China) Zheng Jie	Win	6–4, 7–5
Bank of the West Classic; Stanford, United States of America; WTA Premier; Hard, outdoor 26 July–1 August 2010	28	2R	(Belarus) Olga Govortsova	Win	6–3, 6–3
Bank of the West Classic; Stanford, United States of America; WTA Premier; Hard, outdoor 26 July–1 August 2010	29	QF	(Russia) Elena Dementieva	Win	6–4, 2–6, 6–3
Bank of the West Classic; Stanford, United States of America; WTA Premier; Hard, outdoor 26 July–1 August 2010	30	SF	(Poland) Agnieszka Radwańska	Win	1–6, 6–2, 6–2
Bank of the West Classic; Stanford, United States of America; WTA Premier; Hard, outdoor 26 July–1 August 2010	31	F	(Belarus) Victoria Azarenka	Loss (2)	4–6, 1–6
Western and Southern Financial Group Women's Open; Cincinnati, United States of America; WTA Premier; Hard, outdoor 9–15 August 2010
Western and Southern Financial Group Women's Open; Cincinnati, United States of America; WTA Premier; Hard, outdoor 9–15 August 2010	32	1R	(Russia) Svetlana Kuznetsova	Win	6–4, 1–6, 6–2
Western and Southern Financial Group Women's Open; Cincinnati, United States of America; WTA Premier; Hard, outdoor 9–15 August 2010	33	2R	(Germany) Andrea Petkovic	Win	6–3, 6–1
Western and Southern Financial Group Women's Open; Cincinnati, United States of America; WTA Premier; Hard, outdoor 9–15 August 2010	34	3R	(Poland) Agnieszka Radwańska	Win	6–2, 6–3
Western and Southern Financial Group Women's Open; Cincinnati, United States of America; WTA Premier; Hard, outdoor 9–15 August 2010	35	QF	(France) Marion Bartoli	Win	6–1, 6–4
Western and Southern Financial Group Women's Open; Cincinnati, United States of America; WTA Premier; Hard, outdoor 9–15 August 2010	36	SF	(Russia) Anastasia Pavlyuchenkova	Win	6–4, 3–6, 6–2
Western and Southern Financial Group Women's Open; Cincinnati, United States of America; WTA Premier; Hard, outdoor 9–15 August 2010	37	F	(Belgium) Kim Clijsters	Loss (3)	6–2, 6–7^{(4–7)}, 2–6
US Open; New York, United States of America; Grand Slam; Hard, outdoor 30 August–13 September 2010	38	1R	(Australia) Jarmila Gajdošová	Win	4–6, 6–3, 6–1
US Open; New York, United States of America; Grand Slam; Hard, outdoor 30 August–13 September 2010	39	2R	(Czech Republic) Iveta Benešová	Win	6–1, 6–2
US Open; New York, United States of America; Grand Slam; Hard, outdoor 30 August–13 September 2010	40	3R	(United States) Beatrice Capra	Win	6–0, 6–0
US Open; New York, United States of America; Grand Slam; Hard, outdoor 30 August–13 September 2010	41	4R	(Denmark) Caroline Wozniacki	Loss	3–6, 4–6
Toray Pan Pacific Open; Tokyo, Japan; WTA Premier 5 Hard, outdoor 27 September–2 October 2010	42	1R	(Japan) Kimiko Date-Krumm	Loss	5–7, 6–3, 3–6
China Open; Beijing, China; WTA Premier Mandatory; Hard, outdoor 2–11 October 2010	43	1R	(Bulgaria) Tsvetana Pironkova	Win	6–4, 7–6^{(7–5)}
China Open; Beijing, China; WTA Premier Mandatory; Hard, outdoor 2–11 October 2010	44	2R	(Russia) Elena Vesnina	Loss	6–7^{(3–7)}, 2–6

== Tournament schedule ==
=== Singles Schedule ===
Date	Championship	Location	Category	Surface	Prev. result	New result	Outcome
18 January 2010– 31 January 2010	Australian Open	Melbourne (AUS)	Grand Slam tournament	Hard	DNP	1R	Lost in the first round against Maria Kirilenko
13 February 2010– 21 February 2010	Cellular South Cup	Memphis (USA)	WTA International	Hard (i)	DNP	W	Won in the final against Sofia Arvidsson
8 March 2010– 21 March 2010	BNP Paribas Open	Indian Wells (USA)	WTA Premier Mandatory	Hard	DNP	3R	Lost in the third round against Zheng Jie
10 May 2010– 16 May 2010	Mutua Madrileña Madrid Open	Madrid (ESP)	WTA Premier Mandatory	Clay	DNP	1R	Lost in the first round against Lucie Šafářová
17 May 2010– 22 May 2010	Internationaux de Strasbourg	Strasbourg (FRA)	WTA International	Clay	DNP	W	Won in the final against Kristina Barrois
23 May 2010– 6 June 2010	French Open	Paris (FRA)	Grand Slam	Clay	QF	3R	Lost in the third round against Justine Henin
7 June 2010– 13 June 2010	Aegon Classic	Birmingham (GBR)	WTA International	Grass	DNP	F	Lost in the final against Li Na
21 June 2010; 4 July 2010	The Championships, Wimbledon	London (GBR)	Grand Slam	Grass	2R	4R	Lost in the fourth round against Serena Williams
26 July 2010– 1 August 2010	Bank of the West Classic	Stanford (USA)	WTA Premier	Hard	QF	F	Lost in the final against Victoria Azarenka
9 August 2010– 15 August 2010	Western and Southern Financial Group Women's Open	Cincinnati (USA)	WTA Premier 5	Hard	DNP	F	Lost in the final against Kim Clijsters
30 August 2010; 13 September 2010	US Open	New York (USA)	Grand Slam	Hard	3R	4R	Lost in the fourth round against Caroline Wozniacki
27 September 2010– 2 October 2010	Toray Pan Pacific Open	Tokyo (JPN)	WTA Premier 5	Hard	W	1R	Lost in the first round against Kimiko Date-Krumm
2 October 2010– 11 October 2010	China Open	Beijing (CHN)	WTA Premier Mandatory	Hard	3R	2R	Lost in the second round against Elena Vesnina

== Yearly records ==
=== Head-to-head matchups ===
Ordered by percentage, number of victories to number of losses, then in alphabetical order

- (United States) Bethanie Mattek-Sands 2–0
- (Poland) Agnieszka Radwańska 2–0
- (Sweden) Sofia Arvidsson 1–0
- (United Kingdom) Elena Baltacha 1–0
- (Germany) Kristina Barrois 1–0
- (France) Marion Bartoli 1–0
- (Czech Republic) Iveta Benešová 1–0
- (United States) Beatrice Capra 1–0
- (Russia) Elena Dementieva 1–0
- (Russia) Vera Dushevina 1–0
- (Bulgaria) Dia Evtimova 1–0
- (Belgium) Kirsten Flipkens 1–0
- (Australia) Jarmila Gajdošová 1–0
- (Germany) Julia Görges 1–0
- (Belarus) Olga Govortsova 1–0
- (Bulgaria) Sesil Karatantcheva 1–0
- (Russia) Regina Kulikova 1–0
- (Russia) Alla Kudryavtseva 1–0
- (Russia) Svetlana Kuznetsova 1–0
- (Czech Republic) Petra Kvitová 1–0
- (Spain) Anabel Medina Garrigues 1–0
- (Russia) Anastasia Pavlyuchenkova 1–0
- (United States) Shenay Perry 1–0
- (Russia) Ksenia Pervak 1–0
- (Germany) Andrea Petkovic 1–0
- (Bulgaria) Tsvetana Pironkova 1–0
- (Russia) Anastasia Pivovarova 1–0
- (Romania) Ioana Raluca Olaru 1–0
- (United States) Alison Riske 1–0
- (Czech Republic) Barbora Záhlavová-Strýcová 1–0
- (China) Zheng Jie 1–1
- (Belarus) Victoria Azarenka 0–1
- (Belgium) Kim Clijsters 0–1
- (Japan) Kimiko Date-Krumm 0–1
- (Belgium) Justine Henin 0–1
- (Russia) Maria Kirilenko 0–1
- (China) Li Na 0–1
- (Czech Republic) Lucie Šafářová 0–1
- (Russia) Elena Vesnina 0–1
- (United States) Serena Williams 0–1
- (Denmark) Caroline Wozniacki 0–1

=== Finals ===
==== Singles: 5 (2–3) ====
Category WTA Premier 5 (0–1) WTA Premier (0–1) WTA International (2–1)	Titles by surface Hard (2–2) Grass (0–1)	Titles by conditions Indoors (1–0) Outdoors (1–3)

Outcome	No.	Date	Tournament	Surface	Opponent in the final	Score
Winner	21.	February 21, 2010	Memphis, United States of America (1)	Hard	(Sweden) Sofia Arvidsson	6–2, 6–1
Winner	22.	May 22, 2010	Strasbourg, France (1)	Clay	(Germany) Kristina Barrois	7–5, 6–1
Runner-up		June 13, 2010	Birmingham, Great Britain (2)	Grass	(China) Li Na	5–7, 1–6
Runner-up		August 1, 2010	Stanford, United States of America (1)	Hard	(Belarus) Victoria Azarenka	4–6, 1–6
Runner-up		August 15, 2010	Cincinnati, United States of America (1)	Hard	(Belgium) Kim Clijsters	6–2, 6–7^{(4–7)}, 2–6

== See also ==
- 2010 Serena Williams tennis season
- 2010 WTA Tour
