= 2011 Mutua Madrid Open – Women's doubles =

Women's doubles
- 2011 Mutua Madrid Open

Final
- Champion: (Belarus) Victoria Azarenka (Russia) Maria Kirilenko
- Runner-up: (Czech Republic) Květa Peschke (Slovenia) Katarina Srebotnik
- Score: 6–4, 6–3

Events
Singles	men	women
Doubles	men	women
← 2010 ·	Mutua Madrid Open	· 2012 →

Serena Williams and Venus Williams were the defending champions, but they withdrew due to injuries.
No. 5 seeds Victoria Azarenka and Maria Kirilenko won the tournament by defeating the No. 2 seeds Květa Peschke and Katarina Srebotnik 6–4, 6–3 in the final.

== Seeds ==
The top four seeds receive a bye into the second round.

1. (Argentina) Gisela Dulko / (Italy) Flavia Pennetta (quarterfinals)
2. (Czech Republic) Květa Peschke / (Slovenia) Katarina Srebotnik (final)
3. (United States) Vania King / (Kazakhstan) Yaroslava Shvedova (semifinals)
4. (United States) Liezel Huber / (United States) Lisa Raymond (second round)
5. (Belarus) Victoria Azarenka / (Russia) Maria Kirilenko (champions)
6. (United States) Bethanie Mattek-Sands / (United States) Meghann Shaughnessy (quarterfinals)
7. (Spain) María José Martínez Sánchez / (Spain) Anabel Medina Garrigues (second round)
8. (Czech Republic) Iveta Benešová / (Czech Republic) Barbora Záhlavová-Strýcová (first round)

== Draw ==
=== Key ===
- Q = Qualifier
- WC = Wild card
- LL = Lucky loser
- Alt = Alternate
- SE = Special exempt
- PR = Protected ranking
- ITF = ITF entry
- JE = Junior exempt
- w/o = Walkover
- r = Retired
- d = Defaulted
- SR = Special ranking

=== Finals ===
Semifinals
5	(Belarus) Victoria Azarenka (Russia) Maria Kirilenko	6	6
3	(United States) Vania King (Kazakhstan) Yaroslava Shvedova	2	4
(Australia) Casey Dellacqua (Australia) Rennae Stubbs	1	6	[2]
2	(Czech Republic) Květa Peschke (Slovenia) Katarina Srebotnik	6	4	[10]

Final
5	(Belarus) Victoria Azarenka (Russia) Maria Kirilenko	6	6
2	(Czech Republic) Květa Peschke (Slovenia) Katarina Srebotnik	4	3

=== Top half ===
First round
(France) A Cornet (Germany) J Görges	3	2
(Spain) N Llagostera Vives (Spain) A Parra Santonja	6	6
(China) S Peng (China) J Zheng	6	6
(Russia) A Kudryavtseva (Germany) J Wöhr	1	2
(Slovakia) D Hantuchová (Poland) A Radwańska	6	3	[6]
5	(Belarus) V Azarenka (Russia) M Kirilenko	4	6	[10]
(Chinese Taipei) C-j Chuang (Belarus) O Govortsova	1	5
WC	(Russia) S Kuznetsova (Russia) V Zvonareva	6	7
WC	(Italy) F Schiavone (Australia) S Stosur	1	7	[10]
(Italy) S Errani (Italy) R Vinci	6	5	[5]
(United States) R Kops-Jones (United States) A Spears	3	6	[4]
6	(United States) B Mattek-Sands (United States) M Shaughnessy	6	3	[10]

Second round
1	(Argentina) G Dulko (Italy) F Pennetta	7	6
(Spain) N Llagostera Vives (Spain) A Parra Santonja	5	2
(China) S Peng (China) J Zheng	2	4
5	(Belarus) V Azarenka (Russia) M Kirilenko	6	6
3	(United States) V King (Kazakhstan) Y Shvedova	6	6
WC	(Russia) S Kuznetsova (Russia) V Zvonareva	3	1
WC	(Italy) F Schiavone (Australia) S Stosur	4	2
6	(United States) B Mattek-Sands (United States) M Shaughnessy	6	6

Quarterfinals
1	(Argentina) G Dulko (Italy) F Pennetta	6	2	[6]
5	(Belarus) V Azarenka (Russia) M Kirilenko	4	6	[10]
3	(United States) V King (Kazakhstan) Y Shvedova	7	5	[10]
6	(United States) B Mattek-Sands (United States) M Shaughnessy	5	7	[8]

Semifinals
5	(Belarus) V Azarenka (Russia) M Kirilenko	6	6
3	(United States) V King (Kazakhstan) Y Shvedova	2	4

=== Bottom half ===
First round
7	(Spain) MJ Martínez Sánchez (Spain) A Medina Garrigues	6	6
(Russia) M Kondratieva (Czech Republic) V Uhlířová	1	1
(Romania) M Niculescu (Israel) S Pe'er	3	5
(Chinese Taipei) S-w Hsieh (China) Z Yan	6	7
WC	(Romania) S Halep (Slovenia) P Hercog	4	4
(Australia) C Dellacqua (Australia) R Stubbs	6	6
8	(Czech Republic) I Benešová (Czech Republic) B Záhlavová-Strýcová	6	1	[2]
(India) S Mirza (Russia) E Vesnina	3	6	[10]
(Russia) V Dushevina (Belarus) T Poutchek	3	4
(Russia) N Petrova (Australia) A Rodionova	6	6
WC	(Spain) L Domínguez Lino (Spain) L Pous Tió	4	5
(Poland) K Jans (Poland) A Rosolska	6	7

Second round
7	(Spain) MJ Martínez Sánchez (Spain) A Medina Garrigues	3	4
(Chinese Taipei) S-w Hsieh (China) Z Yan	6	6
(Australia) C Dellacqua (Australia) R Stubbs	6	6
4	(United States) L Huber (United States) L Raymond	4	3
(India) S Mirza (Russia) E Vesnina	6	7
(Russia) N Petrova (Australia) A Rodionova	3	5
(Poland) K Jans (Poland) A Rosolska	2	6	[3]
2	(Czech Republic) K Peschke (Slovenia) K Srebotnik	6	1	[10]

Quarterfinals
(Chinese Taipei) S-w Hsieh (China) Z Yan	6	6^{5}	[9]
(Australia) C Dellacqua (Australia) R Stubbs	4	7	[11]
(India) S Mirza (Russia) E Vesnina	5	5
2	(Czech Republic) K Peschke (Slovenia) K Srebotnik	7	7

Semifinals
(Australia) C Dellacqua (Australia) R Stubbs	1	6	[2]
2	(Czech Republic) K Peschke (Slovenia) K Srebotnik	6	4	[10]
