= 2011 Mutua Madrid Open – Men's doubles =

Men's doubles
- 2011 Mutua Madrid Open

Final
- Champion: (United States) Bob Bryan (United States) Mike Bryan
- Runner-up: (France) Michaël Llodra (Serbia) Nenad Zimonjić
- Score: 6–3, 6–3

Events
Singles	men	women
Doubles	men	women
← 2010 ·	Mutua Madrid Open	· 2012 →

Bob Bryan and Mike Bryan were the defending champions and they eventually managed to retain the title by beating No. 6 seeds Michaël Llodra and Nenad Zimonjić 6–3, 6–3 in the final.

== Seeds ==
All seeds received a bye into the second round.

1. (United States) Bob Bryan / (United States) Mike Bryan (champions)
2. (Belarus) Max Mirnyi / (Canada) Daniel Nestor (quarterfinals)
3. (Austria) Jürgen Melzer / (Germany) Philipp Petzschner (withdrew)
4. (India) Rohan Bopanna / (Pakistan) Aisam-ul-Haq Qureshi (quarterfinals)
5. (Poland) Łukasz Kubot / (Austria) Oliver Marach (second round)
6. (France) Michaël Llodra / (Serbia) Nenad Zimonjić (final)
7. (Poland) Mariusz Fyrstenberg / (Poland) Marcin Matkowski (quarterfinals)
8. (South Africa) Wesley Moodie / (Belgium) Dick Norman (quarterfinals)

== Draw ==
=== Key ===
- Q = Qualifier
- WC = Wild card
- LL = Lucky loser
- Alt = Alternate
- SE = Special exempt
- PR = Protected ranking
- ITF = ITF entry
- JE = Junior exempt
- w/o = Walkover
- r = Retired
- d = Defaulted
- SR = Special ranking

=== Finals ===
Semifinals
1	(United States) Bob Bryan (United States) Mike Bryan	4	6	[12]
(United States) John Isner (United States) Sam Querrey	6	1	[10]
Alt	(Croatia) Marin Čilić (Croatia) Ivan Ljubičić	6	1	[10]
6	(France) Michaël Llodra (Serbia) Nenad Zimonjić	4	6	[12]

Final
1	(United States) Bob Bryan (United States) Mike Bryan	6	6
6	(France) Michaël Llodra (Serbia) Nenad Zimonjić	3	3

=== Top half ===
First round
(Slovakia) M Mertiňák (Serbia) V Troicki	7	6
(Czech Republic) L Dlouhý (Israel) A Ram	6^{3}	3
(Brazil) T Bellucci (Ukraine) A Dolgopolov	7	4	[10]
(Ukraine) S Stakhovsky (Russia) M Youzhny	6^{5}	6	[8]
(Sweden) R Lindstedt (Romania) H Tecău	4	6	[10]
WC	(Spain) R Ramírez Hidalgo (Spain) S Ventura	6	3	[12]
(United States) J Isner (United States) S Querrey	6^{6}	6	[10]
WC	(Spain) D Gimeno Traver (Spain) I Navarro	7	2	[8]

Second round
1	(United States) B Bryan (United States) M Bryan	6	7
(Slovakia) M Mertiňák (Serbia) V Troicki	4	6^{3}
(Brazil) T Bellucci (Ukraine) A Dolgopolov	5	4
7	(Poland) M Fyrstenberg (Poland) M Matkowski	7	6
4	(India) R Bopanna (Pakistan) A-u-H Qureshi	6	6
WC	(Spain) R Ramírez Hidalgo (Spain) S Ventura	3	0
(United States) J Isner (United States) S Querrey	6	1	[10]
5	(Poland) Ł Kubot (Austria) O Marach	3	6	[7]

Quarterfinals
1	(United States) B Bryan (United States) M Bryan	6	6
7	(Poland) M Fyrstenberg (Poland) M Matkowski	3	4
4	(India) R Bopanna (Pakistan) A-u-H Qureshi	7	4	[3]
(United States) J Isner (United States) S Querrey	6^{6}	6	[10]

Semifinals
1	(United States) B Bryan (United States) M Bryan	4	6	[12]
(United States) J Isner (United States) S Querrey	6	1	[10]

=== Bottom half ===
First round
Alt	(Spain) J Martí (Spain) D Muñoz-De La Nava	6	6
Alt	(Russia) N Nesterov (Spain) S Pérez-Pérez	0	3
(Spain) M Granollers (Spain) M López	6	6
(United Kingdom) A Murray (United Kingdom) J Murray	2	2
(Brazil) M Melo (Brazil) B Soares	7	6
(The Bahamas) M Knowles (United States) A Roddick	6^{2}	4
(France) R Gasquet (France) J-W Tsonga	6	4	[10]
Alt	(Argentina) JI Chela (Argentina) J Mónaco	3	6	[6]

Second round
8	(South Africa) W Moodie (Belgium) D Norman	6	7
Alt	(Spain) J Martí (Spain) D Muñoz-De La Nava	3	6^{11}
(Spain) M Granollers (Spain) M López	3	3
Alt	(Croatia) M Čilić (Croatia) I Ljubičić	6	6
6	(France) M Llodra (Serbia) N Zimonjić	6	6
(Brazil) M Melo (Brazil) B Soares	4	4
(France) R Gasquet (France) J-W Tsonga	2	3
2	(Belarus) M Mirnyi (Canada) D Nestor	6	6

Quarterfinals
8	(South Africa) W Moodie (Belgium) D Norman	5	6^{5}
Alt	(Croatia) M Čilić (Croatia) I Ljubičić	7	7
6	(France) M Llodra (Serbia) N Zimonjić	6	4	[10]
2	(Belarus) M Mirnyi (Canada) D Nestor	4	6	[6]

Semifinals
Alt	(Croatia) M Čilić (Croatia) I Ljubičić	6	1	[10]
6	(France) M Llodra (Serbia) N Zimonjić	4	6	[12]
