= 2011 Mutua Madrid Open – Women's singles =

Women's singles
- 2011 Mutua Madrid Open

Final
- Champion: (Czech Republic) Petra Kvitová
- Runner-up: (Belarus) Victoria Azarenka
- Score: 7–6^{(7–3)}, 6–4

Events
Singles	men	women
Doubles	men	women
← 2010 ·	Mutua Madrid Open	· 2012 →

Petra Kvitová defeated Victoria Azarenka in the final, 7–6^{(7–3)}, 6–4 to win the women's singles tennis title at the 2011 Madrid Open. It was her first Premier Mandatory title, and her third title of the year.

Aravane Rezaï was the defending champion, but was defeated by Sofia Arvidsson in the first round.

This tournament marked the final professional appearance of former world No. 1 and Olympic silver medalist Dinara Safina; she lost to Julia Görges in the second round.

== Seeds ==
1. (Denmark) Caroline Wozniacki (third round)
2. (Russia) Vera Zvonareva (third round)
3. (Italy) Francesca Schiavone (third round)
4. (Belarus) Victoria Azarenka (final)
5. (Australia) Samantha Stosur (third round)
6. (China) Li Na (semifinals)
7. (Serbia) Jelena Janković (second round)
8. (Russia) Maria Sharapova (third round)
9. (Israel) Shahar Pe'er (first round)
10. (Poland) Agnieszka Radwańska (second round)
11. (France) Marion Bartoli (second round)
12. (Russia) Svetlana Kuznetsova (first round)
13. (Germany) Andrea Petkovic (second round)
14. (Estonia) Kaia Kanepi (first round)
15. (Serbia) Ana Ivanovic (first round)
16. (Czech Republic) Petra Kvitová (champion)

== Draw ==
=== Key ===
- Q = Qualifier
- WC = Wild card
- LL = Lucky loser
- Alt = Alternate
- SE = Special exempt
- PR = Protected ranking
- ITF = ITF entry
- JE = Junior exempt
- w/o = Walkover
- r = Retired
- d = Defaulted
- SR = Special ranking

=== Finals ===
Quarterfinals
(Germany) Julia Görges	6	6
(Russia) Anastasia Pavlyuchenkova	4	2
4	(Belarus) Victoria Azarenka	6	3	6
(Czech Republic) Lucie Šafářová	3	6	2
6	(China) Li Na	6	3	6
(United States) Bethanie Mattek-Sands	4	6	4
(Slovakia) Dominika Cibulková	6	3	5
16	(Czech Republic) Petra Kvitová	3	6	7

Semifinals
(Germany) Julia Görges	4	2
4	(Belarus) Victoria Azarenka	6	6
6	(China) Li Na	3	1
16	(Czech Republic) Petra Kvitová	6	6

Final
4	(Belarus) Victoria Azarenka	6^{3}	4
16	(Czech Republic) Petra Kvitová	7	6

=== Top half ===
==== Section 1 ====
First round
1	(Denmark) C Wozniacki	6	6
(Japan) A Morita	2	3
(Hungary) G Arn	4	6	3
(Serbia) B Jovanovski	6	2	6
Q	(Spain) N Llagostera Vives	7	4	3
WC	(Russia) D Safina	5	6	6
(Germany) J Görges	6^{3}	6	6
14	(Estonia) K Kanepi	7	1	4
11	(France) M Bartoli	6	6
Q	(Romania) S Halep	4	1
(Russia) A Pavlyuchenkova	6	6
(China) J Zheng	0	1
(Japan) K Date-Krumm	3	3
(Slovakia) D Hantuchová	6	6
(Argentina) G Dulko	6	2	2
5	(Australia) S Stosur	3	6	6

Second round
1	(Denmark) C Wozniacki	6	6
(Serbia) B Jovanovski	4	4
WC	(Russia) D Safina	4	6	4
(Germany) J Görges	6	4	6
11	(France) M Bartoli	5	1
(Russia) A Pavlyuchenkova	7	6
(Slovakia) D Hantuchová	6^{1}	5
5	(Australia) S Stosur	7	7

Third round
1	(Denmark) C Wozniacki	4	6	3
(Germany) J Görges	6	1	6
(Russia) A Pavlyuchenkova	7	6
5	(Australia) S Stosur	6^{4}	3

Quarterfinals
(Germany) J Görges	6	6
(Russia) A Pavlyuchenkova	4	2

==== Section 2 ====
First round
4	(Belarus) V Azarenka	6	6
(Russia) V Dushevina	0	0
Q	(Sweden) S Arvidsson	6	3	6
(France) A Rezaï	3	6	4
(Italy) F Pennetta	3	5
WC	(Spain) A Parra Santonja	6	7
(Spain) L Domínguez Lino	3	1
13	(Germany) A Petkovic	6	6
10	(Poland) A Radwańska	2	6	6
(Kazakhstan) Y Shvedova	6	1	3
(Russia) M Kirilenko	5	6	6^{4}
(Australia) J Gajdošová	7	3	7
WC	(Spain) A Medina Garrigues	2	6	6^{3}
(Czech Republic) L Šafářová	6	2	7
WC	(Spain) L Pous Tió	2	0
7	(Serbia) J Janković	6	6

Second round
4	(Belarus) V Azarenka	6	6
Q	(Sweden) S Arvidsson	1	1
WC	(Spain) A Parra Santonja	6	7
13	(Germany) A Petkovic	2	6^{5}
10	(Poland) A Radwańska	6	3	3
(Australia) J Gajdošová	3	6	6
(Czech Republic) L Šafářová	6	4	7
7	(Serbia) J Janković	4	6	5

Third round
4	(Belarus) V Azarenka	6	6
WC	(Spain) A Parra Santonja	0	3
(Australia) J Gajdošová	3	3
(Czech Republic) L Šafářová	6	6

Quarterfinals
4	(Belarus) V Azarenka	6	3	6
(Czech Republic) L Šafářová	3	6	2

=== Bottom half ===
==== Section 3 ====
First round
6	(China) N Li	6	7
(Spain) MJ Martínez Sánchez	4	6^{6}
(Czech Republic) B Záhlavová-Strýcová	3	2
(Czech Republic) I Benešová	6	6
Q	(Belarus) O Govortsova	4	0
(Italy) R Vinci	6	6
(Russia) A Kleybanova	6	6
9	(Israel) S Pe'er	3	2
15	(Serbia) A Ivanovic	6	4	4
(United States) B Mattek-Sands	0	6	6
(Russia) N Petrova	1	6^{5}
Q	(United States) V King	6	7
(Czech Republic) K Zakopalová	6^{6}	4
(Italy) S Errani	7	6
(China) S Peng	5	6^{2}
3	(Italy) F Schiavone	7	7

Second round
6	(China) N Li	6	6
(Czech Republic) I Benešová	1	4
(Italy) R Vinci	6	6
(Russia) A Kleybanova	2	2
(United States) B Mattek-Sands	6	6
Q	(United States) V King	0	2
(Italy) S Errani	0	6	3
3	(Italy) F Schiavone	6	2	6

Third round
6	(China) N Li	2	6	6
(Italy) R Vinci	6	2	1
(United States) B Mattek-Sands	7	6
3	(Italy) F Schiavone	6^{5}	3

Quarterfinals
6	(China) N Li	6	3	6
(United States) B Mattek-Sands	4	6	4

==== Section 4 ====
First round
8	(Russia) M Sharapova	2	6	6
WC	(Netherlands) A Rus	6	3	2
(Russia) E Makarova	6	6
(Belgium) Y Wickmayer	4	4
(Hungary) Á Szávay	7	4	6
(Bulgaria) T Pironkova	6^{5}	6	1
(Slovakia) D Cibulková	6	6
12	(Russia) S Kuznetsova	3	2
16	(Czech Republic) P Kvitová	6	6
(Romania) A Dulgheru	4	1
Q	(Romania) M Niculescu	6	3	6^{3}
Q	(South Africa) C Scheepers	4	6	7
Q	(India) S Mirza	4	3
(Russia) E Vesnina	6	6
(Switzerland) P Schnyder	2	6	2
2	(Russia) V Zvonareva	6	1	6

Second round
8	(Russia) M Sharapova	6	3	6
(Russia) E Makarova	3	6	1
(Hungary) Á Szávay
(Slovakia) D Cibulková	w/o
16	(Czech Republic) P Kvitová	6	6
Q	(South Africa) C Scheepers	3	3
(Russia) E Vesnina	6	3	3
2	(Russia) V Zvonareva	0	6	6

Third round
8	(Russia) M Sharapova	5	4
(Slovakia) D Cibulková	7	6
16	(Czech Republic) P Kvitová	6	6
2	(Russia) V Zvonareva	1	4

Quarterfinals
(Slovakia) D Cibulková	6	3	5
16	(Czech Republic) P Kvitová	3	6	7
