= 2011 Mutua Madrid Open – Men's singles =

Men's singles
- 2011 Mutua Madrid Open

Final
- Champion: (Serbia) Novak Djokovic
- Runner-up: (Spain) Rafael Nadal
- Score: 7–5, 6–4

Events
Singles	men	women
Doubles	men	women
- Mutua Madrid Open

Novak Djokovic defeated the defending champion Rafael Nadal in the final, 7–5, 6–4 to win the men's singles tennis title at the 2011 Madrid Open. It was Djokovic's third ATP Masters 1000 title of the year, first Madrid Open title, sixth title of the year, and the 24th title of his career. Notably, this was the first time Djokovic scored a victory over Nadal on a clay court.

== Seeds ==
The top eight seeds received a bye into the second round.

1. (Spain) Rafael Nadal (final)
2. (Serbia) Novak Djokovic (champion)
3. (Switzerland) Roger Federer (semifinals)
4. (United Kingdom) Andy Murray (third round)
5. (Sweden) Robin Söderling (quarterfinals)
6. (Spain) David Ferrer (quarterfinals)
7. (Czech Republic) Tomáš Berdych (quarterfinals)
8. (Austria) Jürgen Melzer (second round)
9. (France) Gaël Monfils (second round, retired due to sickness)
10. (Spain) Nicolás Almagro (first round)
11. (United States) Mardy Fish (first round)
12. (United States) Andy Roddick (first round)
13. (Russia) Mikhail Youzhny (first round)
14. (Switzerland) Stanislas Wawrinka (first round)
15. (Spain) Fernando Verdasco (first round)
16. (Serbia) Viktor Troicki (first round)

== Draw ==
Key

- Q = Qualifier
- WC = Wild card
- LL = Lucky loser
- Alt = Alternate
- ITF = ITF entry
- PR = Protected ranking
- SR = Special ranking
- SE = Special exempt
- JE = Junior exempt
- JR = Junior Accelerator Programme entrant
- CO = College Accelerator Programme entrant
- NG = Next Gen Accelerator Program entrant
- w/o = Walkover
- r = Retired
- d = Defaulted

=== Finals ===
Quarterfinals
1	(Spain) Rafael Nadal	6	6
(France) Michaël Llodra	2	2
3	(Switzerland) Roger Federer	7^{7}	6
5	(Sweden) Robin Söderling	6^{2}	4
7	(Czech Republic) Tomáš Berdych	6^{2}	3
(Brazil) Thomaz Bellucci	7^{7}	6
6	(Spain) David Ferrer	4	6	3
2	(Serbia) Novak Djokovic	6	4	6

Semifinals
1	(Spain) Rafael Nadal	5	6	6
3	(Switzerland) Roger Federer	7	1	3
(Brazil) Thomaz Bellucci	6	4	1
2	(Serbia) Novak Djokovic	4	6	6

Final
1	(Spain) Rafael Nadal	5	4
2	(Serbia) Novak Djokovic	7	6

=== Top half ===
==== Section 1 ====
First round
Q	(Colombia) A Falla	3	6	6^{5}
(Cyprus) M Baghdatis	6	3	7^{7}
(Croatia) M Čilić	7^{7}	6
(Italy) P Starace	6^{5}	4
PR	(Argentina) JM del Potro	6	3	6
13	(Russia) M Youzhny	1	6	3
12	(United States) A Roddick	4	7^{9}	3
Q	(Italy) F Cipolla	6	6^{7}	6
(United States) S Querrey	2	3
(France) M Llodra	6	6
(France) R Gasquet	6	4	3
Q	(Spain) D Gimeno Traver	3	6	6

Second round
1	(Spain) R Nadal	6	6
(Cyprus) M Baghdatis	1	3
(Croatia) M Čilić	3	0
PR	(Argentina) JM del Potro	6	6
Q	(Italy) F Cipolla	4	2
(France) M Llodra	6	6
Q	(Spain) D Gimeno Traver	7^{10}	6
8	(Austria) J Melzer	6^{8}	3

Third round
1	(Spain) R Nadal	w/o
PR	(Argentina) JM del Potro
(France) M Llodra	1	6	7^{7}
Q	(Spain) D Gimeno Traver	6	4	6^{4}

Quarterfinals
1	(Spain) R Nadal	6	6
(France) M Llodra	2	2

==== Section 2 ====
First round
(Canada) M Raonic	6	6^{2}	4
(Spain) F López	4	7^{7}	6
Q	(Romania) V Hănescu	6	4	5
(Belgium) X Malisse	3	6	7
(Chinese Taipei) Y-h Lu	7^{9}	7
15	(Spain) F Verdasco	6^{7}	5
10	(Spain) N Almagro	1	3
(France) J-W Tsonga	6	6
WC	(Japan) K Nishikori	2	4
Q	(Spain) P Riba	6	6
(Ukraine) A Dolgopolov	1	5
(Colombia) S Giraldo	6	7

Second round
3	(Switzerland) R Federer	7^{15}	6^{1}	7^{9}
(Spain) F López	6^{13}	7^{7}	6^{7}
(Belgium) X Malisse	6	6
(Chinese Taipei) Y-h Lu	2	2
(France) J-W Tsonga	6	6
Q	(Spain) P Riba	4	2
(Colombia) S Giraldo	3	3
5	(Sweden) R Söderling	6	6

Third round
3	(Switzerland) R Federer	6	6
(Belgium) X Malisse	4	3
(France) J-W Tsonga	6^{8}	5
5	(Sweden) R Söderling	7^{10}	7

Quarterfinals
3	(Switzerland) R Federer	7^{7}	6
5	(Sweden) R Söderling	6^{2}	4

=== Bottom half ===
==== Section 3 ====
First round
WC	(Spain) M Granollers	7	6
(Russia) N Davydenko	5	2
(Argentina) J Mónaco	2	6	6
(Kazakhstan) A Golubev	6	2	2
PR	(Croatia) I Karlović	3	6^{6}
9	(France) G Monfils	6	7^{8}
16	(Serbia) V Troicki	6	5	4
(Germany) F Mayer	4	7	6
(Brazil) T Bellucci	6	6
WC	(Spain) P Andújar	4	2
(Croatia) I Ljubičić	5	6^{8}
(France) G Simon	7	7^{10}

Second round
7	(Czech Republic) T Berdych	6	6
WC	(Spain) M Granollers	4	0
(Argentina) J Mónaco	6	3
9	(France) G Monfils	2	0^{r}
(Germany) F Mayer	7^{7}	3	0^{r}
(Brazil) T Bellucci	6^{5}	6	3
(France) G Simon	4	6	0
4	(United Kingdom) A Murray	6	3	6

Third round
7	(Czech Republic) T Berdych	7	6
(Argentina) J Mónaco	5	3
(Brazil) T Bellucci	6	6
4	(United Kingdom) A Murray	4	2

Quarterfinals
7	(Czech Republic) T Berdych	6^{2}	3
(Brazil) T Bellucci	7^{7}	6

==== Section 4 ====
First round
(Argentina) JI Chela	6	4	4
Q	(France) A Mannarino	4	6	6
(Ukraine) S Stakhovsky	7^{8}	3	7^{7}
(Spain) A Montañés	6^{6}	6	6^{5}
(United States) J Isner	7^{7}	4	7^{7}
11	(United States) M Fish	6^{5}	6	6^{3}
14	(Switzerland) S Wawrinka	4	7	4
(Spain) G García López	6	5	6
Q	(Netherlands) T de Bakker	2	7	6
WC	(Spain) JC Ferrero	6	5	4
(South Africa) K Anderson	6	6
LL	(Belgium) O Rochus	2	4

Second round
6	(Spain) D Ferrer	7	0	6
Q	(France) A Mannarino	5	6	0
(Ukraine) S Stakhovsky	7	4	7^{7}
(United States) J Isner	5	6	6^{3}
(Spain) G García López	6	6
Q	(Netherlands) T de Bakker	2	3
(South Africa) K Anderson	3	4
2	(Serbia) N Djokovic	6	6

Third round
6	(Spain) D Ferrer	6	7^{7}
(Ukraine) S Stakhovsky	3	6^{3}
(Spain) G García López	1	2
2	(Serbia) N Djokovic	6	6

Quarterfinals
6	(Spain) D Ferrer	4	6	3
2	(Serbia) N Djokovic	6	4	6
