= 2011 Mutua Madrid Open =

- Date: 30 April – 8 May
- Edition: 10th (men); 3rd (women)
- Surface: Clay / Outdoor
- Location: Madrid, Spain
- Venue: Park Manzanares

Champions

Men's singles
- (Serbia) Novak Djokovic

Women's singles
- (Czech Republic) Petra Kvitová

Men's doubles
- (United States) Bob Bryan / (United States) Mike Bryan

Women's doubles
- (Belarus) Victoria Azarenka / (Russia) Maria Kirilenko
← 2010 ·	Madrid Open	· 2012 →

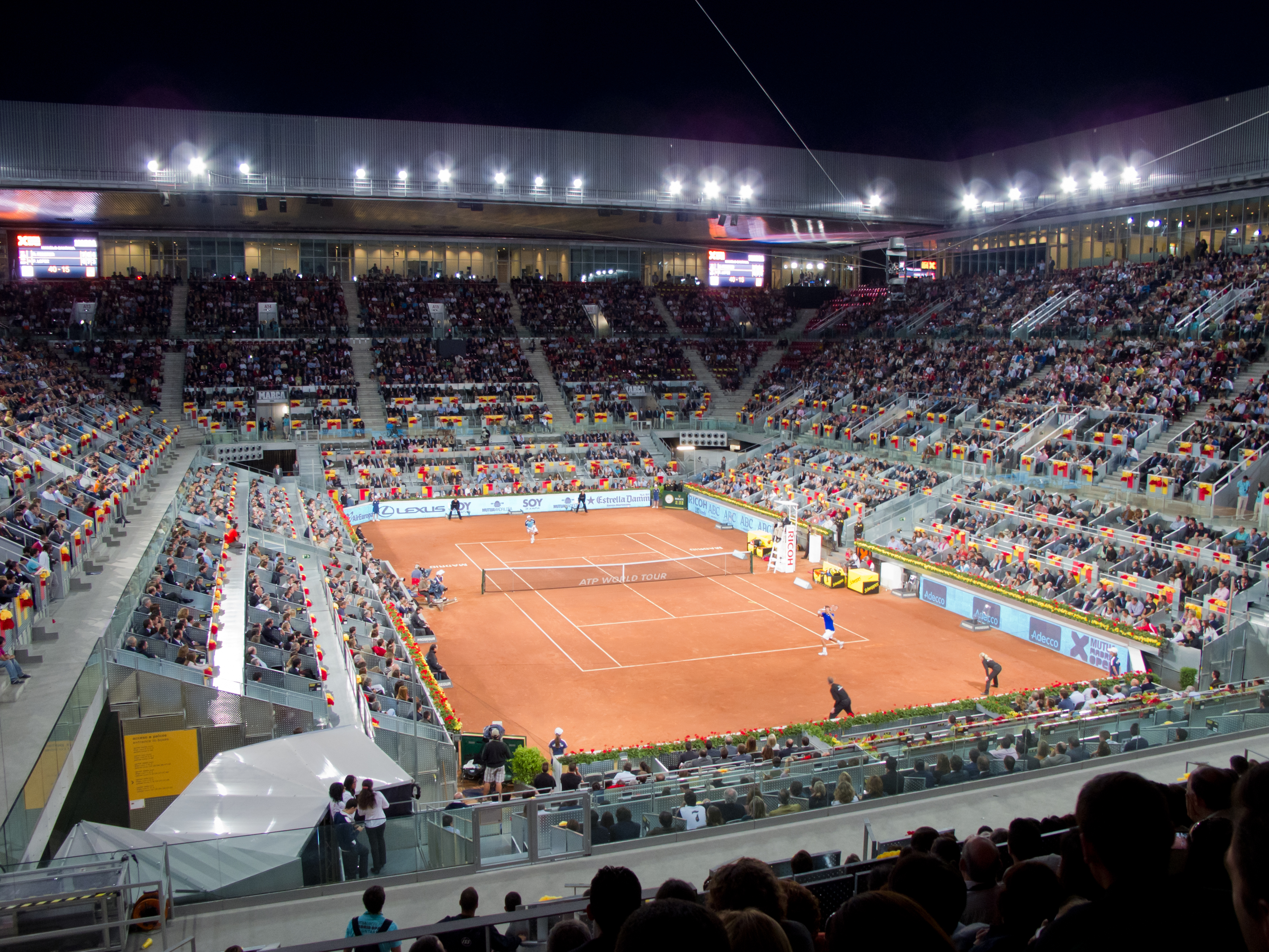
Second round match between Roger Federer and Feliciano López at the 2011 Mutua Madrid Open.

The 2011 Madrid Masters (also known as the Mutua Madrid Open for sponsorship reasons) was played on outdoor clay courts at the Park Manzanares in Madrid, Spain from 30 April – 8 May. It was the 10th edition of the event on the ATP and 3rd on the WTA. It was classified as an ATP World Tour Masters 1000 event on the 2011 ATP World Tour and a Premier Mandatory event on the 2011 WTA Tour.

Ion Țiriac, the former Romanian ATP player and now billionaire businessman, was the owner of the tournament.

== Points and prize money ==
=== Point distribution ===
Stage	Men's singles	Men's doubles	Women's singles	Women's doubles
Champion	1000			
Runner up	600		700	
Semifinals	360		450	
Quarterfinals	180		250	
Round of 16	90		140	
Round of 32	45	10	80	5
Round of 64	10	–	5	–
Qualifier	25	–	30	–
Qualifying Finalist	14	–	20	–
Qualifying 1st round		–	1	–

=== Prize money ===
All money is in US dollars

Stage	Men's Singles	Men's Doubles	Women's Singles	Women's Doubles
Champion	$590,000	$180,000	$620,000	$196,000
Runner up	$275,000	$83,000	$310,000	$98,000
Semifinals	$133,000	$40,000	$135,500	$39,000
Quarterfinals	$67,000	$20,100	$57,500	$15,500
Round of 16	$34,000	$10,300	$27,500	$8,455
Round of 32	$17,600	$5,360	$15,150	$4,200
Round of 64	$9,175	–	$7,825	–
Final round qualifying	$2,400	–	$2,170	–
First round qualifying	$1,200	–	$1,050	–

== ATP entrants ==
=== Seeds ===
Country	Player	Rank^{1}	Seed
ESP	Rafael Nadal	1	1
SRB	Novak Djokovic	2	2
SUI	Roger Federer	3	3
GBR	Andy Murray	4	4
SWE	Robin Söderling	5	5
ESP	David Ferrer	6	6
CZE	Tomáš Berdych	7	7
AUT	Jürgen Melzer	8	8
FRA	Gaël Monfils	9	9
ESP	Nicolás Almagro	10	10
USA	Mardy Fish	11	11
USA	Andy Roddick	12	12
RUS	Mikhail Youzhny	13	13
SUI	Stanislas Wawrinka	14	14
ESP	Fernando Verdasco	15	15
SRB	Viktor Troicki	16	16

- Rankings are as of 25 April 2011.

=== Other entrants ===
The following players received wildcards into the main draw:

- (Spain) Pablo Andújar
- (Spain) Juan Carlos Ferrero
- (Spain) Marcel Granollers
- (Japan) Kei Nishikori

The following players received entry using a protected ranking into the main draw:

- (Argentina) Juan Martín del Potro
- (Croatia) Ivo Karlović

The following players received entry from the qualifying draw:

- (Italy) Flavio Cipolla
- (Netherlands) Thiemo de Bakker
- (Colombia) Alejandro Falla
- (Spain) Daniel Gimeno Traver
- (Romania) Victor Hănescu
- (France) Adrian Mannarino
- (Spain) Pere Riba

The following player received entry as a lucky loser:

- (Belgium) Olivier Rochus

=== Withdrawals ===
- (Latvia) Ernests Gulbis (respiratory problems) → replaced by (Belgium) Olivier Rochus
- (Germany) Tommy Haas → replaced by (Colombia) Santiago Giraldo
- (Germany) Philipp Kohlschreiber → replaced by (Belgium) Xavier Malisse
- (Argentina) David Nalbandian → replaced by (Italy) Potito Starace
- (Spain) Tommy Robredo (knee injury) → replaced by (Croatia) Ivo Karlović

== WTA entrants ==
=== Seeds ===
Country	Player	Rank^{1}	Seed
DEN	Caroline Wozniacki	1	1
RUS	Vera Zvonareva	3	2
ISR	Shahar Pe'er	11	9
POL	Agnieszka Radwańska	12	10
FRA	Marion Bartoli	13	11
RUS	Svetlana Kuznetsova	14	12
GER	Andrea Petkovic	15	13
EST	Kaia Kanepi	17	14
SRB	Ana Ivanovic	18	15
CZE	Petra Kvitová	19	16

- Rankings are as of 26 April 2011.

=== Other entrants ===
The following players received wildcards into the main draw:

- (Spain) Anabel Medina Garrigues
- (Spain) Arantxa Parra Santonja
- (Spain) Laura Pous Tió
- (Netherlands) Arantxa Rus
- (Russia) Dinara Safina

The following players received entry from the qualifying draw:

- (Sweden) Sofia Arvidsson
- (Belarus) Olga Govortsova
- (Romania) Simona Halep
- (United States) Vania King
- (Spain) Nuria Llagostera Vives
- (India) Sania Mirza
- (Romania) Monica Niculescu
- (South Africa) Chanelle Scheepers

=== Withdrawals ===
- (Switzerland) Timea Bacsinszky → replaced by (Russia) Elena Vesnina
- (Russia) Anna Chakvetadze → replaced by (China) Zheng Jie
- (Belgium) Kim Clijsters (torn ligaments, right ankle) → replaced by (Serbia) Bojana Jovanovski
- (Latvia) Anastasija Sevastova → replaced by (Japan) Ayumi Morita
- (United States) Serena Williams (pulmonary embolism) → replaced by (Russia) Vera Dushevina
- (United States) Venus Williams (torn abdominal) → replaced by (Japan) Kimiko Date-Krumm

== Finals ==
=== Men's singles ===
(Serbia) Novak Djokovic defeated (Spain) Rafael Nadal 7–5, 6–4

- It was Djokovic's 6th title of the year and 24th of his career. It was his third Masters title this year, and his eighth overall. He extended his winning streak to 32 matches since the beginning of 2011 and 34 since 2010 Davis Cup final.

=== Women's singles ===
(Czech Republic) Petra Kvitová defeated (Belarus) Victoria Azarenka 7–6^{(7–3)}, 6–4

- It was Kvitová's 3rd title of the year and 4th of her career.

=== Men's doubles ===
(United States) Bob Bryan / (United States) Mike Bryan defeated (France) Michaël Llodra / (Serbia) Nenad Zimonjić 6–3, 6–3

=== Women's doubles ===
(Belarus) Victoria Azarenka / (Russia) Maria Kirilenko defeated (Czech Republic) Květa Peschke / (Slovenia) Katarina Srebotnik 6–4, 6–3
