= 2010 Serena Williams tennis season =

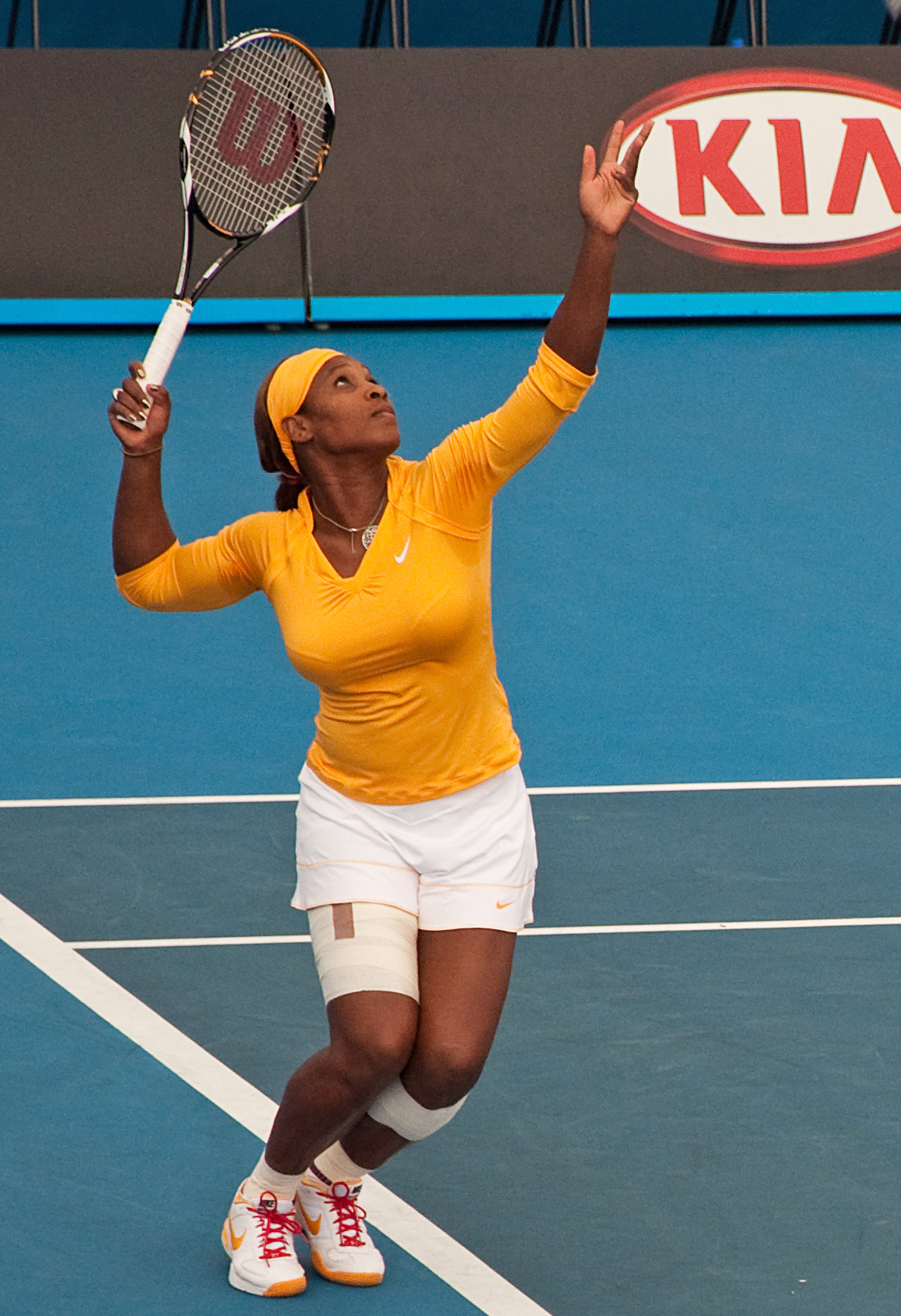
- Serena Williams at the Australian Open
- Full name: Serena Jameka Williams
- Country: United States
- Calendar prize money: $4,266,011

Singles
- Season record: 25–4 (86%)
- Calendar titles: 2
- Year-end ranking: 4
- Ranking change from previous year: ▼3

Grand Slam & significant results
- Australian Open: W
- French Open: QF
- Wimbledon: W
- US Open: A

Doubles
- Season record: 19–1 (95%)
- Calendar titles: 3
- Year-end ranking: No. 11
- Ranking change from previous year: ▼8

Grand Slam doubles results
- Australian Open: W
- French Open: W
- Wimbledon: QF
- US Open: A

Serena Williams's 2010 tennis season officially began at the 2010 Medibank International Sydney in Sydney. Williams started 2010 as the world no. 1.

== Year in detail ==
=== Early hard court season and Australian Open ===
==== Medibank International Sydney ====
Williams' came into 2010 as the world no. 1 and began her 2010 campaign at Medibank International Sydney. She received a bye in the first round being the top seed and faced María José Martínez Sánchez in the next round, whom she defeated convincingly. In the quarterfinals she faced Vera Dushevina and won in two sets. Her next opponent was Frenchwoman Aravane Rezaï, who took the first set and lead in the second set and was serving the match out. However, Williams went on a streak and won the next six games in a row to take the second set and take a lead in the third set. Rezaï broke back at the 2nd and 8th game, but Williams broke again in the 9th game and served it out, beating Rezaï to advance to the final. In the final, Williams fell to Elena Dementieva after being hampered by a troublesome left knee she had strapped for the match.

==== Australian Open ====
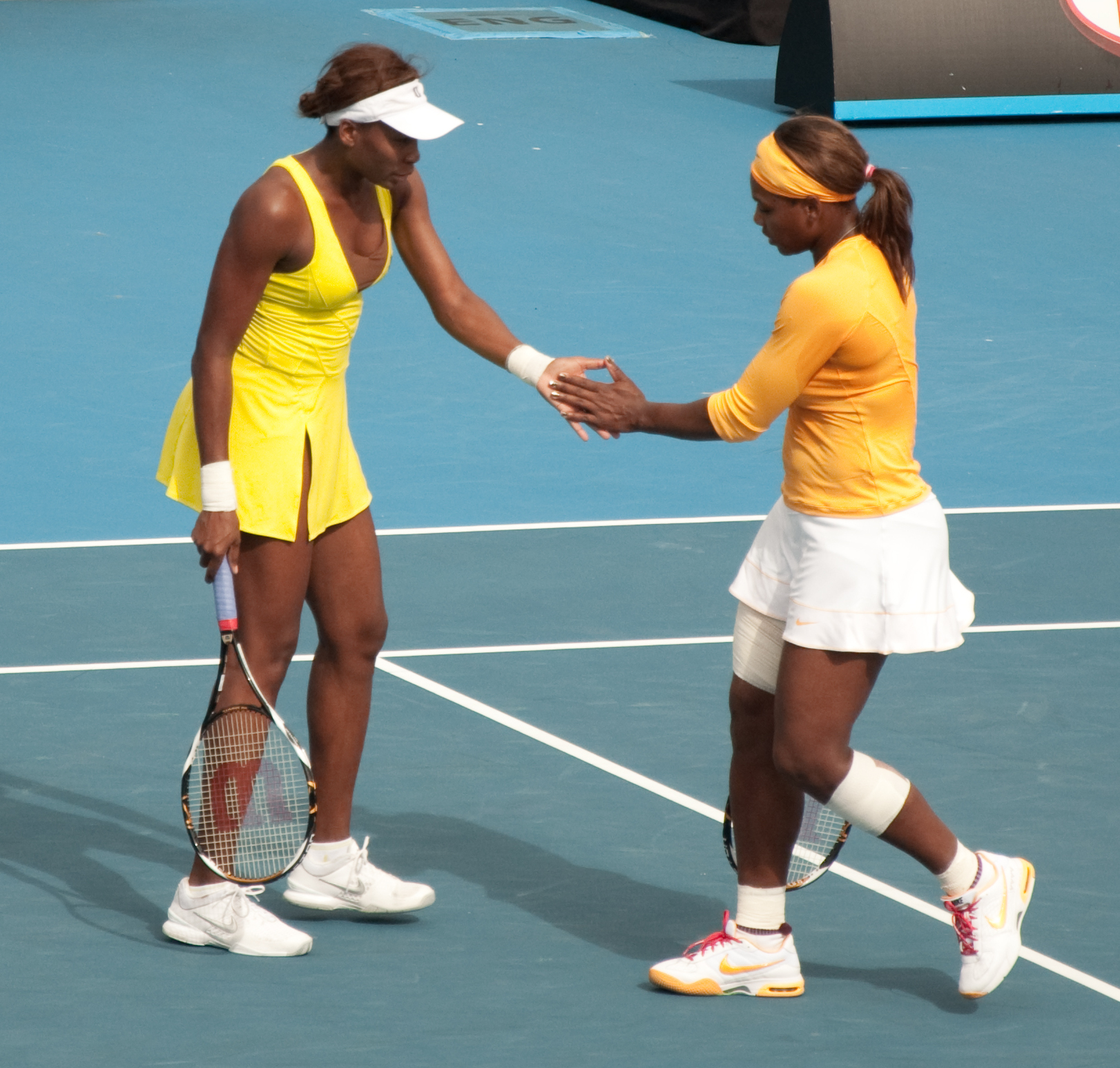
Williams won both the singles and doubles title with sister Venus.

Williams' then entered the Australian Open as the top seed and favorite to win the title. Her campaign began against Poland's Urszula Radwańska, who she beat comfortably. In the second round she defeated Petra Kvitová. Williams hit 34 winners to Kvitová's 17. Williams then faced Carla Suárez Navarro, Williams won the first set, however, Williams had difficulty closing the first set needing eight set points in a game that went to deuce 13 times and lasted longer than the previous five games combined. But Suarez Navarro could not capitalize on the opportunities and Williams won the set. Williams then broke Suarez Navarro to win the match. Williams then faced Australia's Samantha Stosur and ended the Australian's hope by winning in straight sets and hitting 10 aces along the way. Williams' next opponent was Victoria Azarenka, whom Williams dropped the opening set to and was trailing 0–4 in the second set. Williams mounted a comeback, taking the next five games in a row, winning the second set in a tie-break; and took the match by winning the third set. Williams won against China's Li Na; Williams won in two straight tie-break sets to advance to the final. Williams then faced rival Justine Henin in their first match in a slam final. Williams broke in the fourth game, Henin then broke to get back on serve. However, Williams then broke once again to take the first set. Henin saved two break points in a four-game run in the second set, winning 13 of the last 14 points to claim the set. She continued on her streak in the last set, increasing that to 18 of 19 points, but Williams held serve to even the third set. The two then traded breaks which saw Williams lead with a break, and never looked back as Williams took the final three games to win the grand slam title. Williams' five Australian singles titles is the most by any woman in the Open Era (since 1968), surpassing the four held by Margaret Court, Evonne Goolagong Cawley, Steffi Graf, and Monica Seles. Court holds 11 Australian Open titles overall, most coming before the Open Era. Williams also is the first female player to win consecutive Australian Open singles titles since Jennifer Capriati in 2001–02.

Serena Williams also competed in the doubles with sister Venus. In the first two rounds they defeated wild cards Sophie Ferguson and Jessica Moore, and Raluca Olaru and Olga Savchuk. They then faced the Czech team of Andrea Hlaváčková and Lucie Hradecká and won in two sets. In the quarterfinals they struggled against the pairing of American Bethanie Mattek-Sands and Yan Zi in three tight sets. They also had to fight through against Lisa Raymond and Rennae Stubbs. In the final they faced the number 1 team of Cara Black and Liezel Huber and won it in straight sets.

=== Rest of early hard court ===
A leg injury then caused Williams to withdraw from five consecutive tournaments, including the Premier 5 Dubai Tennis Championships and the Premier Mandatory Sony Ericsson Open in Key Biscayne.

=== Clay court season and French Open ===
==== Internazionali BNL d'Italia ====
As the world no. 1, Williams received a wild card at the Internazionali BNL d'Italia. As the top seed she received a bye into the second round, where she faced Timea Bacsinszky, Bacsinszky lead twice and had three set points, however Williams took it to a tie-break and won the first set. Williams then cruised with the second set. In the third round, she faced Andrea Petkovic, Williams broke Petkovic fifth and seventh and won the first set. Petkovic won the second set. Williams dominated the 3rd set. In the quarterfinals, she faced Russian Maria Kirilenko and Williams won in two sets. In the semifinals, a rematch of the 2008 US Open final, when Williams faced Jelena Janković, with both trading sets. Williams served for the match and had a match point, but the match went to a tie-break. Williams led 5–2 in the tie-break and lost 5 points in a row for Janković to get the win.

==== Mutua Madrileña Madrid Open ====
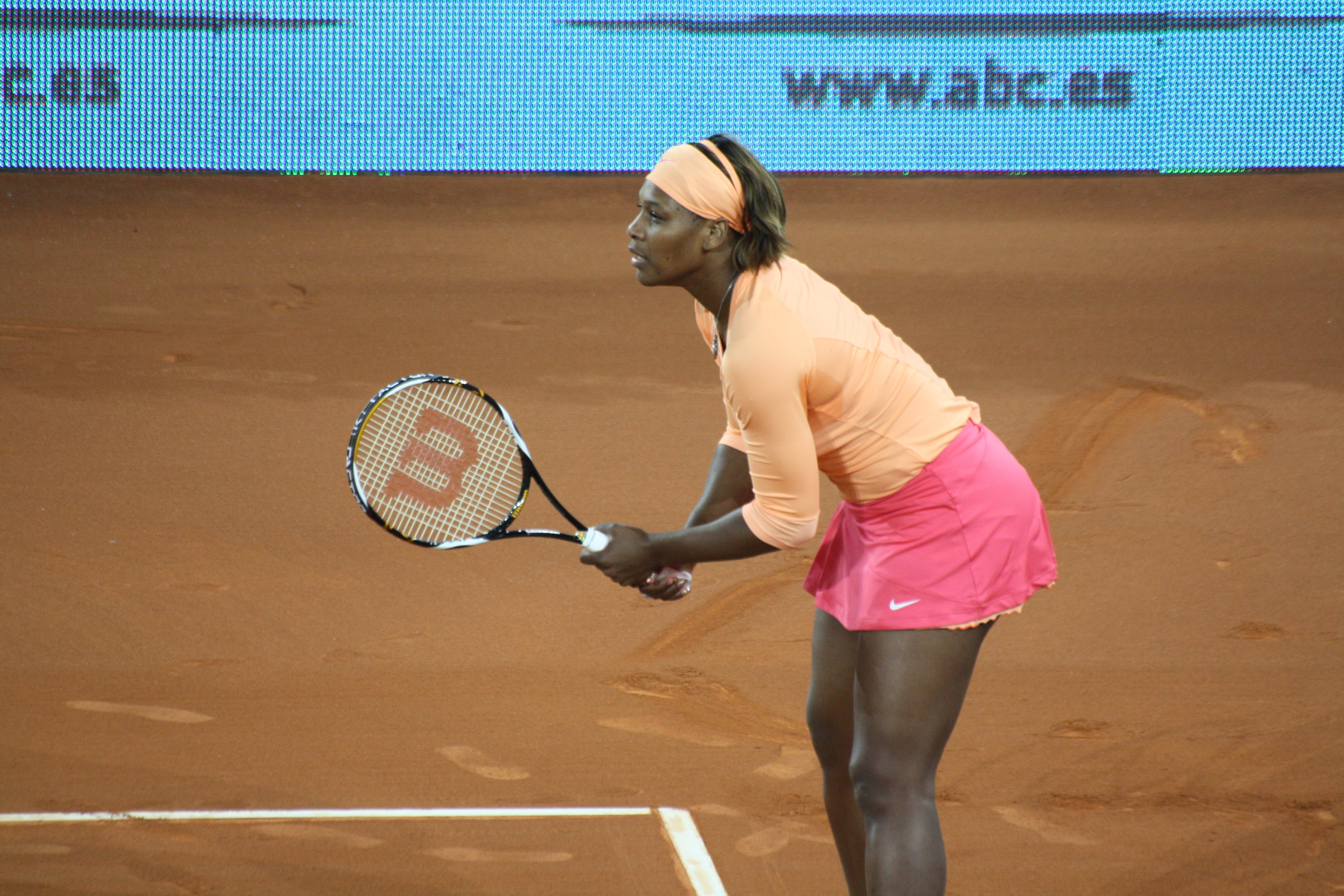
Williams won singles and doubles title with sister Venus in Madrid.

Williams then played the Mutua Madrileña Madrid Open. She received a first round bye. She faced Vera Dushevina in her first match, Williams had three set point in the first set, but Dushevina came back and won it in the tie-break. In the second set Williams faced a match point on serve but saved it and went on to win the set in a tie-break. In the final set Williams led early, but squandered the lead as the set went to a tie-break, which Williams won despite trailing 4–0 in the tie-break. Williams made 73 unforced errors in the match. It was Williams longest match in her career with the match taking 3 hours, 26 minutes. In the next round she faced another Russian Nadia Petrova, however this time the result wasn't in Williams' favor as she lost in three sets.

In the doubles Williams played with sister Venus. After having a bye in the first round the faced Alicja Rosolska and Yaroslava Shvedova and won in two sets. They then faced Maria Kirilenko and Agnieszka Radwańska and also won in straight sets. In the semifinals they won comfortably over Shahar Pe'er and Francesca Schiavone. In the final, they faced up-and-coming doubles team Gisela Dulko and Flavia Pennetta and won in two sets for their second title of the year.

==== French Open ====
Williams entered the French Open as the world no. 1 and top seed. In her first match, she faced Swiss Stefanie Vögele, who was controlling the first set, but Williams hung on to win it in a tie-break. Williams then cruised in the second set. In the second round, she faced German Julia Görges, Williams took nine straight games in the first set and won in straight sets. She then faced Anastasia Pavlyuchenkova. Williams took the first set, however Williams fell behind and was visited by the trainer, Pavlyuchenkova eventually won the set. In the third set, Williams saved 3 break points and won the match. In the fourth round, Williams had a relatively easy win over Israel's Shahar Pe'er. In the quarterfinals, Williams faced Samantha Stosur, Stosur took the first set and served for the match, however Williams came back and won in a tie-break. However Stosur saved a match point at 4–5 on serve and then eventually broke Williams in the deciding set and took the match. Williams was too erratic making nine double faults and 46 enforced errors, while Stosur only made 24 unforced errors. It was the first Grand Slam tournament that Williams had not won or been defeated by the eventual champion since the 2008 French Open. Williams has not been able to get past the quarterfinals since 2003.

Williams again competed in doubles partnering sister Venus. In the first round they made quick work of Kirsten Flipkens and Tamarine Tanasugarn and then received a walkover over Daniela Hantuchová and Caroline Wozniacki. They then won their next two matches with relative ease defeating the teams of Andrea Hlaváčková and Lucie Hradecká, and Maria Kirilenko and Agnieszka Radwańska. In the semifinals, they had a bit of a struggle against Liezel Huber and Anabel Medina Garrigues when they lost the first set, but came back to win the second and third. With the win, this assured Williams the no. 1 spot in doubles, making her only the sixth woman to hold the no. 1 spot in singles and doubles. In the final they faced the team of Květa Peschke and Katarina Srebotnik which they won with ease in straight sets. This marked their fourth consecutive doubles slam. They're only the third women's doubles pair to win four major titles in a row. Martina Navratilova and Pam Shriver did it in 1983–84, and Gigi Fernández and Natasha Zvereva did it in 1992–93.

=== Wimbledon Championships ===
Williams was entering Wimbledon as the world no. 1, defending champion, and 3 time former champion. She started her campaign for a fourth title against a young Portuguese in Michelle Larcher de Brito. Williams won comfortably beating de Brito in straight sets. In the following round, she faced former world no. 5 Anna Chakvetadze, Williams won the first 11 games, before Chakvetadze was able to get a game, and in the end Williams won in two sets. She also hit 27 winners to her opponents 6. In the third round, she faced another youngster in Dominika Cibulková, Williams served her third 6–0 set of the tournament in the first in just 18 minutes. The second set went on serve until Williamd broke to take the second set and the match. Williams hit 20 aces to her opponents 1. It was followed by a clash against former world no. 1 Maria Sharapova, the first set went to a tie-break and Sharapova served for the set, but Williams pegged her back and won the tie-break. Williams then took the second set. In the quarterfinals, Williams faced China's Li Na, the first set went on served until Williams broke Li late and closed the set. Williams then cruised in the second set. In her following match, Williams took on Petra Kvitová, who has lost in the first round of her previous two appearances at Wimbledon. Kvitová took an early lead breaking Williams in the fifth game, however Williams broke in the eight game and the set went to a tie-break. Williams won the tie-break. As with her previous two matches Williams took the second set with east. Competing in her 6th Wimbledon final, Williams took on surprised finalist Vera Zvonareva, the first set went on serve in the 8th game when Williams broke the Russian's serve with a forehand winner and won the set. The American broke Zvonareva's serve in the first and fifth games of the second set, giving her the Wimbledon title. Williams won an astonishing 31 of the 33 first serves she put in play, ripping nine more aces, running her record tournament total to 89. This win also pushed Williams to her 13th slam, getting ahead of Billie Jean King. After the match, Martina Navratilova said that Williams is in the top 5 of all the women's tennis players in all of history, which she said that "it's not just about how many Slams you win or how many tournaments you win—it's just your game overall. And she's definitely got all the goods."

In the doubles, she once again played with sister Venus as the top seeds. They cruised through their first three matches winning it straight sets, over the teams of Julie Ditty and Renata Voráčová, Timea Bacsinszky and Tathiana Garbin, and Dominika Cibulková and Anastasia Pavlyuchenkova. However, they were upset by the Russian team of Elena Vesnina and Vera Zvonareva in the quarterfinals. This ended their 27 consecutive wins in slams and 18 match winning streak. This is also their first loss as a team in the year.

=== US Open Series, Asian Swing and WTA Tour Championships ===
In Munich on July 7, Williams stepped on broken glass while in a restaurant. She received 18 stitches, but the following day she lost an exhibition match to Kim Clijsters in Brussels before a world-record crowd for a tennis match, 35,681 at the King Baudouin Stadium. The cut foot turned out to be a serious injury, requiring surgery and preventing her from playing for the remainder of 2010. As a result, she lost the world no. 1 ranking to Dane Caroline Wozniacki on October 11, 2010.

== All matches ==
=== Singles matches ===
Tournament	Match	Round	Opponent	Rank	Result	Score
Medibank International Sydney; Sydney, Australia; WTA Premier; Hard; 10–15 January 2010	–	1R	Bye			
Medibank International Sydney; Sydney, Australia; WTA Premier; Hard; 10–15 January 2010	547	2R	(Spain) María José Martínez Sánchez	#25	Win	6–1, 6–2
Medibank International Sydney; Sydney, Australia; WTA Premier; Hard; 10–15 January 2010	548	QF	(Russia) Vera Dushevina	#43	Win	6–2, 6–2
Medibank International Sydney; Sydney, Australia; WTA Premier; Hard; 10–15 January 2010	549	SF	(France) Aravane Rezaï	#27	Win	3–6, 7–5, 6–4
Medibank International Sydney; Sydney, Australia; WTA Premier; Hard; 10–15 January 2010	550	F	(Russia) Elena Dementieva	#5	Loss	3–6, 2–6
Australian Open; Melbourne, Australia; Grand Slam; Hard, outdoor 18–31 January 2010	551	1R	(Poland) Urszula Radwańska	#72	Win	6–2, 6–1
Australian Open; Melbourne, Australia; Grand Slam; Hard, outdoor 18–31 January 2010	552	2R	(Czech Republic) Petra Kvitová	#77	Win	6–2, 6–1
Australian Open; Melbourne, Australia; Grand Slam; Hard, outdoor 18–31 January 2010	553	3R	(Spain) Carla Suárez Navarro	#33	Win	6–0, 6–3
Australian Open; Melbourne, Australia; Grand Slam; Hard, outdoor 18–31 January 2010	554	4R	(Australia) Samantha Stosur	#13	Win	6–2, 6–4
Australian Open; Melbourne, Australia; Grand Slam; Hard, outdoor 18–31 January 2010	555	QF	(Belarus) Victoria Azarenka	#7	Win	4–6, 7–6^{(7–4)}, 6–2
Australian Open; Melbourne, Australia; Grand Slam; Hard, outdoor 18–31 January 2010	556	SF	(China) Li Na	#17	Win	7–6^{(7–4)}, 7–6^{(7–1)}
Australian Open; Melbourne, Australia; Grand Slam; Hard, outdoor 18–31 January 2010	557	F	(Belgium) Justine Henin	NR	Win	6–4, 3–6, 6–2
Internazionali BNL d'Italia; Rome, Italy; WTA Premier 5 Clay, Red; 3–9 May 2010	–	1R	Bye			
Internazionali BNL d'Italia; Rome, Italy; WTA Premier 5 Clay, Red; 3–9 May 2010	558	2R	(Switzerland) Timea Bacsinszky	#48	Win	7–6^{(7–2)}, 6–1
Internazionali BNL d'Italia; Rome, Italy; WTA Premier 5 Clay, Red; 3–9 May 2010	559	3R	(Germany) Andrea Petkovic	#49	Win	6–2, 3–6, 6–0
Internazionali BNL d'Italia; Rome, Italy; WTA Premier 5 Clay, Red; 3–9 May 2010	560	QF	(Russia) Maria Kirilenko	#37	Win	6–1, 6–4
Internazionali BNL d'Italia; Rome, Italy; WTA Premier 5 Clay, Red; 3–9 May 2010	561	SF	(Serbia) Jelena Janković	#7	Loss	6–4, 3–6, 6–7^{(5–7)}
Mutua Madrileña Madrid Open; Madrid, Spain; WTA Premier Mandatory; Clay, Red; 10–16 May 2010	–	1R	Bye			
Mutua Madrileña Madrid Open; Madrid, Spain; WTA Premier Mandatory; Clay, Red; 10–16 May 2010	562	2R	(Russia) Vera Dushevina	#43	Win	6–7^{(7–9)}, 7–6^{(7–5)}, 7–6^{(7–5)}
Mutua Madrileña Madrid Open; Madrid, Spain; WTA Premier Mandatory; Clay, Red; 10–16 May 2010	563	3R	(Russia) Nadia Petrova	#18	Loss	6–4, 2–6, 3–6
French Open; Paris, France; Grand Slam; Clay, Red; 24 May – 6 June 2010	564	1R	(Switzerland) Stefanie Vögele	#76	Win	7–6^{(7–2)}, 6–2
French Open; Paris, France; Grand Slam; Clay, Red; 24 May – 6 June 2010	565	2R	(Germany) Julia Görges	#77	Win	6–1, 6–1
French Open; Paris, France; Grand Slam; Clay, Red; 24 May – 6 June 2010	566	3R	(Russia) Anastasia Pavlyuchenkova	#29	Win	6–1, 1–6, 6–2
French Open; Paris, France; Grand Slam; Clay, Red; 24 May – 6 June 2010	567	4R	(Israel) Shahar Pe'er	#18	Win	6–2, 6–2
French Open; Paris, France; Grand Slam; Clay, Red; 24 May – 6 June 2010	568	QF	(Australia) Samantha Stosur	#7	Loss	2–6, 7–6^{(9–7)}, 6–8
Wimbledon; London, United Kingdom; Grand Slam; Grass; 21 June – 4 July 2010	569	1R	(Portugal) Michelle Larcher de Brito	#148	Win	6–0, 6–4
Wimbledon; London, United Kingdom; Grand Slam; Grass; 21 June – 4 July 2010	570	2R	(Russia) Anna Chakvetadze	#118	Win	6–0, 6–1
Wimbledon; London, United Kingdom; Grand Slam; Grass; 21 June – 4 July 2010	571	3R	(Slovakia) Dominika Cibulková	#46	Win	6–0, 7–5
Wimbledon; London, United Kingdom; Grand Slam; Grass; 21 June – 4 July 2010	572	4R	(Russia) Maria Sharapova	#17	Win	7–6^{(11–9)}, 6–4
Wimbledon; London, United Kingdom; Grand Slam; Grass; 21 June – 4 July 2010	573	QF	(China) Li Na	#12	Win	7–5, 6–3
Wimbledon; London, United Kingdom; Grand Slam; Grass; 21 June – 4 July 2010	574	SF	(Czech Republic) Petra Kvitová	#62	Win	7–6^{(7–5)}, 6–2
Wimbledon; London, United Kingdom; Grand Slam; Grass; 21 June – 4 July 2010	575	F	(Russia) Vera Zvonareva	#21	Win	6–3, 6–2

=== Doubles matches ===
Tournament	Match	Round	Partner	Opponents	Rank	Result	Score
Australian Open; Melbourne, Australia; Grand Slam; Hard, outdoor 18–31 January 2010	155	1R	(United States) Venus Williams	(Australia) Sophie Ferguson (Australia) Jessica Moore	# #	Win	6–1, 6–1
Australian Open; Melbourne, Australia; Grand Slam; Hard, outdoor 18–31 January 2010	156	2R	(United States) Venus Williams	(Romania) Raluca Olaru (Ukraine) Olga Savchuk	#96 #76	Win	6–1, 6–2
Australian Open; Melbourne, Australia; Grand Slam; Hard, outdoor 18–31 January 2010	157	3R	(United States) Venus Williams	(Czech Republic) Andrea Hlaváčková (Czech Republic) Lucie Hradecká	#52 #42	Win	6–3, 6–2
Australian Open; Melbourne, Australia; Grand Slam; Hard, outdoor 18–31 January 2010	158	QF	(United States) Venus Williams	(United States) Bethanie Mattek-Sands (China) Yan Zi	#17 #23	Win	6–4, 4–6, 6–4
Australian Open; Melbourne, Australia; Grand Slam; Hard, outdoor 18–31 January 2010	159	SF	(United States) Venus Williams	(United States) Lisa Raymond (Australia) Rennae Stubbs	#19 #7	Win	6–3, 7–6^{(8–6)}
Australian Open; Melbourne, Australia; Grand Slam; Hard, outdoor 18–31 January 2010	160	F	(United States) Venus Williams	(Zimbabwe) Cara Black (United States) Liezel Huber	#1 #1	Win	6–4, 6–3
Mutua Madrileña Madrid Open; Madrid, Spain; WTA Premier Mandatory; Clay, Red; 10–16 May 2010	–	1R	(United States) Venus Williams	Bye; Bye			
Mutua Madrileña Madrid Open; Madrid, Spain; WTA Premier Mandatory; Clay, Red; 10–16 May 2010	161	2R	(United States) Venus Williams	(Poland) Alicja Rosolska (Kazakhstan) Yaroslava Shvedova	#49 #54	Win	7–6^{(7–4)} 6–2
Mutua Madrileña Madrid Open; Madrid, Spain; WTA Premier Mandatory; Clay, Red; 10–16 May 2010	162	QF	(United States) Venus Williams	(Russia) Maria Kirilenko (Poland) Agnieszka Radwańska	#23 #36	Win	6–2, 6–4
Mutua Madrileña Madrid Open; Madrid, Spain; WTA Premier Mandatory; Clay, Red; 10–16 May 2010	163	SF	(United States) Venus Williams	(Israel) Shahar Pe'er (Italy) Francesca Schiavone	#72 #25	Win	7–5, 6–2
Mutua Madrileña Madrid Open; Madrid, Spain; WTA Premier Mandatory; Clay, Red; 10–16 May 2010	164	F	(United States) Venus Williams	(Argentina) Gisela Dulko (Italy) Flavia Pennetta	#18 #20	Win	6–2, 7–5
French Open; Paris, France; Grand Slam; Clay, Red; 24 May – 6 June 2010	165	1R	(United States) Venus Williams	(Belgium) Kirsten Flipkens (Thailand) Tamarine Tanasugarn	#263 #83	Win	6–0, 6–1
French Open; Paris, France; Grand Slam; Clay, Red; 24 May – 6 June 2010	–	2R	(United States) Venus Williams	(Slovakia) Daniela Hantuchová (Denmark) Caroline Wozniacki	#47 #108	Walkover	
French Open; Paris, France; Grand Slam; Clay, Red; 24 May – 6 June 2010	166	3R	(United States) Venus Williams	(Czech Republic) Andrea Hlaváčková (Czech Republic) Lucie Hradecká	#44 #36	Win	6–1, 6–2
French Open; Paris, France; Grand Slam; Clay, Red; 24 May – 6 June 2010	167	QF	(United States) Venus Williams	(Russia) Maria Kirilenko (Poland) Agnieszka Radwańska	#18 #32	Win	6–2, 6–3
French Open; Paris, France; Grand Slam; Clay, Red; 24 May – 6 June 2010	168	SF	(United States) Venus Williams	(United States) Liezel Huber (Spain) Anabel Medina Garrigues	#1 #14	Win	2–6, 6–2, 6–4
French Open; Paris, France; Grand Slam; Clay, Red; 24 May – 6 June 2010	169	F	(United States) Venus Williams	(Czech Republic) Květa Peschke (Slovenia) Katarina Srebotnik	#22 #28	Win	6–2, 6–3
Wimbledon Championships; London, United Kingdom; Grand Slam; Grass, outdoor 21 June – 4 July 2010	170	1R	(United States) Venus Williams	(United States) Julie Ditty (Czech Republic) Renata Voráčová	#569 #54	Win	6–4, 6–2
Wimbledon Championships; London, United Kingdom; Grand Slam; Grass, outdoor 21 June – 4 July 2010	171	2R	(United States) Venus Williams	(Switzerland) Timea Bacsinszky (Italy) Tathiana Garbin	#74 #39	Win	6–1, 7–6^{(7–2)}
Wimbledon Championships; London, United Kingdom; Grand Slam; Grass, outdoor 21 June – 4 July 2010	172	3R	(United States) Venus Williams	(Slovakia) Dominika Cibulková (Russia) Anastasia Pavlyuchenkova	#206 #97	Win	6–1, 6–2
Wimbledon Championships; London, United Kingdom; Grand Slam; Grass, outdoor 21 June – 4 July 2010	173	QF	(United States) Venus Williams	(Russia) Elena Vesnina (Russia) Vera Zvonareva	#45 #193	Loss	6–3, 3–6, 4–6

== Tournament schedule ==
=== Singles schedule ===
Williams' 2010 singles tournament schedule is as follows:

Date	Championship	Location	Category	Surface	Points	Outcome
10 January 2010– 15 January 2010	Medibank International Sydney	Sydney (AUS)	WTA Premier	Hard	320	Final lost to Elena Dementieva, 2–6, 3–6
18 January 2010– 31 January 2010	Australian Open	Melbourne (AUS)	Grand Slam	Hard	2000	Winner defeated Justine Henin, 6–4, 3–6, 6–2
3 May 2010– 9 May 2010	Internazionali BNL d'Italia	Rome (ITA)	WTA Premier 5	Clay, Red	395	Semifinals lost to Jelena Janković, 6–4, 3–6, 6–7^{(5–7)}
10 May 2010– 16 May 2010	Mutua Madrileña Madrid Open	Madrid (ESP)	WTA Premier Mandatory	Clay, Red	140	Second round lost to Nadia Petrova 6–4, 2–6, 3–6
24 May 2010– 6 June 2010	French Open	Paris (FRA)	Grand Slam	Clay	500	Quarterfinals lost to Samantha Stosur, 2–6, 7–6^{(9–7)}, 6–8
21 June 2010– 4 July 2010	The Championships, Wimbledon	Wimbledon (GBR)	Grand Slam	Grass	2000	Winner defeated Vera Zvonareva, 6–3, 6–2
Total year-end points					5355	

=== Doubles schedule ===
Williams' 2010 doubles tournament schedule is as follows:

Date	Championship	Location	Category	Partner	Surface	Points	Outcome
18 January 2010– 31 January 2010	Australian Open	Melbourne (AUS)	Grand Slam	(United States) Venus Williams	Hard	2000	Winner defeated Black/Huber, 6–4, 6–3, 7–6^{(5–7)}
10 May 2010– 16 May 2010	Mutua Madrileña Madrid Open	Madrid (ESP)	WTA Premier Mandatory	(United States) Venus Williams	Clay, Red	1000	Winner defeated Dulko/Pennetta, 6–2, 7–5
24 May 2010– 6 June 2010	French Open	Paris (FRA)	Grand Slam	(United States) Venus Williams	Clay	2000	Winner defeated Peschke/Srebotnik, 6–2, 6–3
21 June 2010– 4 July 2010	The Championships, Wimbledon	Wimbledon (GBR)	Grand Slam	(United States) Venus Williams	Grass	500	Quarterfinals lost to Vesnina/Zvonareva, 3–6, 6–3, 6–4
Total year-end points						5500	

== Yearly records ==
=== Head-to-head matchups ===
Ordered by percentage of wins

- (Russia) Vera Dushevina 2–0
- (Czech Republic) Petra Kvitová 2–0
- (China) Li Na 2–0
- (Spain) María José Martínez Sánchez 1–0
- (France) Aravane Rezaï 1–0
- (Poland) Urszula Radwańska 1–0
- (Spain) Carla Suárez Navarro 1–0
- (Israel) Shahar Pe'er 1–0
- (Portugal) Michelle Larcher de Brito 1–0
- (Belarus) Victoria Azarenka 1–0
- (Belgium) Justine Henin 1–0
- (Switzerland) Timea Bacsinszky 1–0
- (Germany) Andrea Petkovic 1–0
- (Russia) Maria Kirilenko 1–0
- (Russia) Anastasia Pavlyuchenkova 1–0
- (Switzerland) Stefanie Vögele 1–0
- (Germany) Julia Görges 1–0
- (Slovakia) Dominika Cibulková 1–0
- (Russia) Maria Sharapova 1–0
- (Russia) Anna Chakvetadze 1–0
- (Russia) Vera Zvonareva 1–0
- (Australia) Samantha Stosur 1–1
- (Russia) Elena Dementieva 0–1
- (Serbia) Jelena Janković 0–1
- (Russia) Nadia Petrova 0–1

=== Finals ===
==== Singles: 2 (2–1) ====
Legend Grand Slam (2–0) WTA Premier (0–1)	Finals by surface Hard (1–1) Grass (1–0)	Finals by venue Outdoors (2–1)

Outcome	No.	Date	Championship	Surface	Opponent in the final	Score in the final
Runner-up	14.	January 15, 2010	Sydney, Australia	Hard	(Russia) Elena Dementieva	3–6, 2–6
Winner	36.	January 30, 2010	Melbourne, Australia	Hard	(Belgium) Justine Henin	6–4, 3–6, 6–2
Winner	37.	July 3, 2010	London U.K.	Grass	(Russia) Vera Zvonareva	6–3, 6–2

==== Doubles: 3 (3–0) ====
Legend Grand Slam (2–0) Premier 5 (1–0)	Titles by surface Hard (1–0) Clay(1–0) Grass (1–0)	Titles by surface Outdoors (3–0)

Outcome	No.	Date	Championship	Surface	Partner	Opponent in the final	Score in the final
Winner	18.	January 29, 2010	Australian Open, Melbourne, Australia (4)	Hard	(United States) Venus Williams	(Zimbabwe) Cara Black (United States) Liezel Huber	6–4, 6–3
Winner	19.	May 15, 2010	Madrid, Spain (1)	Clay	(United States) Venus Williams	(Argentina) Gisela Dulko (Italy) Flavia Pennetta	6–2, 7–5
Winner	20.	June 3, 2010	French Open, Paris, France (2)	Clay	(United States) Venus Williams	(Czech Republic) Květa Peschke (Slovenia) Katarina Srebotnik	6–2, 6–3

=== Earnings ===
#	Event	Prize money	Year-to-date
1	Medibank International Sydney	$53,100	$53,100
2	Australian Open	$1,744,460	$1,797,560
2	Australian Open (doubles)	$186,907	$1,984,467
3	Internazionali BNL d'Italia	$87,500	$2,071,967
4	Mutua Madrileña Madrid Open	$38,028	$2,109,995
4	Mutua Madrileña Madrid Open (doubles)	$135,519	$2,245,514
5	French Open	$185,983	$2,431,497
5	French Open (doubles)	$212,552	$2,644,049
6	Wimbledon	$1,597,936	$4,241,985
6	Wimbledon (doubles)	$24,026	$4,266,011
			$4,266,011

Figures in United States dollars (USD) unless noted.

== See also ==
- 2010 WTA Tour

Sporting positions
Preceded by Venus Williams; Angelique Kerber	World No. 1 First stint: July 8, 2002 – August 10, 2003; Last stint: April 24, 2017 – May 14, 2017	Succeeded by Kim Clijsters; Angelique Kerber
Preceded by Jennifer Capriati; Justine Henin; Petra Kvitová	Year-end World No. 1; 2002; 2008, 2009; 2012 – 2015	Succeeded by Justine Henin; Kim Clijsters; Angelique Kerber
Awards
Preceded by Jennifer Capriati; Jelena Janković; Petra Kvitová	ITF Women's Singles World Champion; 2002; 2009; 2012 – 2015	Succeeded by Justine Henin; Caroline Wozniacki; Angelique Kerber
Preceded by Martina Hingis & Anna Kournikova; Cara Black & Liezel Huber	WTA Doubles Team of the Year; 2000 (with Venus Williams); 2009 (with Venus Williams)	Succeeded by Lisa Raymond & Rennae Stubbs; Gisela Dulko & Flavia Pennetta
Preceded by Cara Black & Liezel Huber	ITF Women's Doubles World Champion; 2009 (with Venus Williams)	Succeeded by Gisela Dulko & Flavia Pennetta
