= 2010 Mutua Madrileña Madrid Open =

- Date: 7–16 May
- Edition: 9th (men); 2nd (women)
- Surface: Clay / outdoor
- Location: Madrid, Spain
- Venue: Park Manzanares

Champions

Men's singles
- (Spain) Rafael Nadal

Women's singles
- (France) Aravane Rezaï

Men's doubles
- (United States) Bob Bryan / (United States) Mike Bryan

Women's doubles
- (United States) Serena Williams / (United States) Venus Williams
← 2009 ·	Madrid Open	· 2011 →

The 2010 Madrid Masters (also known as the Mutua Madrileña Madrid Open for sponsorship reasons) was played on outdoor clay courts at the Park Manzanares in Madrid, Spain from May 7–16. It was the ninth edition of the tournament on the ATP and second on the WTA. It was classified as an ATP World Tour Masters 1000 event on the 2010 ATP World Tour and a Premier Mandatory event on the 2010 WTA Tour.

== Finals ==
=== Men's singles ===
(Spain) Rafael Nadal defeated (Switzerland) Roger Federer 6–4, 7–6^{(7–5)}

- It was Nadal's third title of the year and 39th of his career. It was his 18th Masters title, setting the all-time record. It was his 2nd win at Madrid, also winning in 2005.

=== Women's singles ===
(France) Aravane Rezaï defeated (United States) Venus Williams 6–2, 7–5

- It was Rezaï's first title of the year and 3rd of her career.

=== Men's doubles ===
(United States) Bob Bryan / (United States) Mike Bryan defeated (Canada) Daniel Nestor / (Serbia) Nenad Zimonjić 6–3, 6–4

- It was the Bryans' 5th title of the year and 61st as a team.

=== Women's doubles ===
(United States) Serena Williams / (United States) Venus Williams defeated (Argentina) Gisela Dulko / (Italy) Flavia Pennetta 6–2, 7–5

- It was the Williams' 2nd title of the year, and 18th overall as a team.

== ATP entrants ==
=== Seeds ===
Player	Nationality	Ranking*	Seeding
Roger Federer	Switzerland	1	1
Rafael Nadal	Spain	3	2
Andy Murray	Great Britain	4	3
Robin Söderling	Sweden	7	4
~~Andy Roddick~~	~~USA~~	~~8~~	~~5~~
Fernando Verdasco	Spain	9	6
Jo-Wilfried Tsonga	France	10	7
Marin Čilić	Croatia	11	8
David Ferrer	Spain	12	9
Mikhail Youzhny	Russia	15	10
~~Tomáš Berdych~~	~~Czech Republic~~	~~16~~	~~11~~
Gaël Monfils	France	18	12
John Isner	United States	21	13
Sam Querrey	United States	22	14
Stanislas Wawrinka	Switzerland	23	15
Thomaz Bellucci	Brazil	26	16

- Rankings are as of May 3, 2010.

=== Other entrants ===
The following players received wildcards into the main draw:

- (Spain) Marcel Granollers
- (Spain) Carlos Moyá
- (Spain) Pere Riba
- (Argentina) David Nalbandian

The following players received entry from the qualifying draw:

- (South Africa) Kevin Anderson
- (Argentina) Juan Ignacio Chela
- (Ukraine) Oleksandr Dolgopolov Jr.
- (Spain) Daniel Gimeno Traver
- (Colombia) Santiago Giraldo
- (Spain) Daniel Muñoz de la Nava
- (Belgium) Christophe Rochus

The following players received lucky loser spots:

- (United States) Michael Russell
- (United States) Mardy Fish
- (Spain) Óscar Hernández

=== Withdrawals ===
The following notable players withdrew from the event:

- (Serbia) Novak Djokovic (allergies)
- (United States) Andy Roddick (stomach virus)
- (Argentina) Juan Martín del Potro (right wrist)
- (Russia) Nikolay Davydenko (broken wrist)
- (Chile) Fernando González (knee injury)
- (Croatia) Ivan Ljubičić (left side strain)
- (Czech Republic) Tomáš Berdych (right hip injury)
- (Spain) Juan Carlos Ferrero (knee injury)
- (United States) Tommy Haas (right hip surgery)
- (Spain) Tommy Robredo (back injury)
- (France) Gilles Simon (right knee)
- (Czech Republic) Radek Štěpánek (fatigue)
- (Argentina) David Nalbandian (leg injury)

== WTA entrants ==
=== Seeds ===
Player	Nationality	Ranking*	Seeding
Serena Williams	USA	1	1
Caroline Wozniacki	Denmark	2	2
Dinara Safina	Russia	3	3
Venus Williams	USA	4	4
Svetlana Kuznetsova	Russia	5	5
Elena Dementieva	Russia	6	6
Jelena Janković	Serbia	7	7
Samantha Stosur	Australia	8	8
Agnieszka Radwańska	Poland	9	9
Victoria Azarenka	Belarus	10	10
Maria Sharapova	Russia	13	11
Marion Bartoli	France	14	12
Li Na	China	15	13
Flavia Pennetta	Italy	16	14
Francesca Schiavone	Italy	17	15
Nadia Petrova	Russia	18	16

- Rankings are as of May 3, 2010.

=== Other entrants ===
The following players received wildcards into the main draw:

- (Austria) Sybille Bammer
- (Serbia) Ana Ivanovic
- (Spain) Arantxa Parra Santonja
- (China) Peng Shuai
- (Spain) Virginia Ruano Pascual

The following players received entry from the qualifying draw:

- (Uzbekistan) Akgul Amanmuradova
- (Czech Republic) Iveta Benešová
- (France) Alizé Cornet
- (Belgium) Kirsten Flipkens
- (Spain) Beatriz García Vidagany
- (Czech Republic) Petra Kvitová
- (Switzerland) Stefanie Vögele
- (Czech Republic) Klára Zakopalová

The following player received the lucky loser spot:

- (Italy) Tathiana Garbin

=== Withdrawals ===
The following notable players withdrew from this event:

- (Belgium) Kim Clijsters (left foot)
- (Belgium) Yanina Wickmayer (elbow injury)
- (Ukraine) Kateryna Bondarenko (left knee injury)
